= Kato dve kapki voda 2026 =

- Season 2026
- Hosted by: Dimitar Rachkov; Gerasim Georgiev – Gero
- Judges: Veselin Marinov; Dimitar Kovatchev – Funky; Hilda Kazasyan; Azis
- Winner: Daniel Peev – Dundi
- Runner-up: Emilia
- No. of episodes: 12

Release
- Original network: NOVA
- Original release: 16 February – 18 May 2026

The fourteenth season of Bulgarian reality show „Kato dve kapki voda“ started on February 16 and ended on May 18.

Dimitar Rachkov and Gerasim Georgiev – Gero returned as hosts, while Hilda Kazasyan, Dimitar Kovatchev – Funky and Veselin Marinov were joined by new judge Azis (who participated in the third and the ninth season). Aleksandra Eneva and Vladimir Mihaylov returned as the choreography and acting mentors respectively and Mihaela Marinova (who won the fifth season and participated in the ninth season) became the new singing mentor. The final was held for the second time in „Arena Sofia“. The public vote took place on the NOVA PLAY app. Borislav Zahariev returned as the podcast host.

== Contestants ==
№	Contestant	Notability	Points	Result
1	Daniel Peev – Dundi	Actor	560	Winner
2	Emilia	Pop-folk singer	613	Runner-up
3	Ivo Dimchev	Pop singer, actor	568	Third place
4	Aleksandra Raeva	Actress, TV host, pop singer	602	Finalist
5	Boris Hristov	Pop and rock singer	550	Finalist
6	Simona	Pop-folk singer	497	Finalist
7	Viktor Todorov	Pop singer	493	Finalist
8	Plamena Petrova	Pop and pop-folk singer	439	Finalist
9	Vesela Babinova	Actress	431	Finalist

For the third season in a row all the contestants qualified for the final. The original final four (Emilia, Aleksandra Raeva, Ivo Dimchev and Daniel Peev – Dundi) started with 2 points, while the other participants (Boris Hristov, Simona, Viktor Todorov, Plamena Petrova and Vesela Babinova) started with 0 points.

== Imitations chart ==
Highest scoring performance
Lowest scoring performance

Celebrity	Week 1	Week 2	Week 3	Week 4	Week 5	Week 6	Week 7	Week 8	Week 9	Week 10	Week 11	Points	Week 12 - Final	Result
Daniel Peev – Dundi	Led Zeppelin	Carrapicho	Maria Kehayova	Petar Chernev	Bonnie Tyler	Bryan Adams	Måneskin	U2 & Mary J. Blige	Mila Robert	Cheb Khaled	Britney Spears	560	AC/DC	Winner
Emilia	Whitney Houston	Nirvana	Lili Ivanova	Binka Dobreva	100 Kila & Lora Karadzhova	4 Non Blondes	Raye	Glora & Azis	Krasimir Radkov	Dara Ekimova	Sofi Marinova	613	Pasha Hristova	Runner-up
Ivo Dimchev	Tom Jones	Édith Piaf	Emil Dimitrov	Mile Kitić	Elina Garanca	Volodya Stoyanov	Sam Smith	Toni Storaro & Fiki	Todor Kolev	Toni Braxton	Ray Charles	568	Vasil Naydenov	Third
Aleksandra Raeva	Tina Turner	Philipp Kirkorov	Katya Filipova	Taylor Dayne	Ivo Dimchev	The Cranberries	Emilia & Florin Salam	Cher & Eros Ramazotti	Veselin Marinov	Technotronic	Dara	602	Madonna	Finalist
Boris Hristov	Teddy Swims	Cher	Veselin Marinov	Eros Ramazotti	Miley Cyrus	Vasilis Karras	Tommy Cash	Vasil Naydenov & Silvia Katsarova	Bananarama	Vasil Mihaylov	The Prodigy	550	Elvis Presley	Finalist
Simona	Britney Spears	Barbara Pravi	Vanya Kostova	Ritchie Valens	Elaine Paige	Lady Gaga	Georgi Stanchev	Mariah Carey & Whitney Houston	Aretha Franklin	Aerosmith	Lara Fabian	497	Christina Aguilera	Finalist
Viktor Todorov	Prince	MC Hammer	Ivana	Village People	Freddie Mercury of Queen	Gwen Stefani	Medi	Ed Sheeran & Tom Jones	Bruno Mars	Luciano Pavarotti	Janet Jackson	493	James Brown	Finalist
Plamena Petrova	Celine Dion	Montserrat Caballe	Margarita Hranova	System of a Down	Desi Slava & Azis	Haddaway	Christina Aguilera	Olivia Newton-John & John Travolta	Bon Jovi	Shakira	Beyoncé	439	Lili Ivanova	Finalist
Vesela Babinova	Shakira	Anelia	Silvia Katsarova	Anne Hathaway	Rihanna	Adele	Tarkan	KariZma	Evanescence	Mihaela Fileva	Enrique Iglesias	431	Lady Gaga	Finalist

== Weekly scores ==
=== Week 1 (February 16) ===
Order	Contestant	Performing as	Song	Points						Total	Result
Order	Contestant	Performing as	Song	Vesko	Funky	Hilda	Azis	Public	Bonus	Total	Result
1	Aleks Raeva	Tina Turner	„Proud Mary“	6	9	8	10	12	5	50	4th
2	Ivo Dimchev	Tom Jones	„Delilah“	8	7	10	8	18	0	51	3rd
3	Emilia	Whitney Houston	„I Will Always Love You“	5	3	3	9	14	0	34	7th
4	Boris	Teddy Swims	„The Door“	7	6	7	4	16	0	40	5th
5	Babinova	Shakira	„La Tortura“	4	4	6	6	6	0	26	9th
6	Plamena	Celine Dion	„The Power of Love“	10	8	4	3	10	0	35	6th
7	Simona	Britney Spears	„(You Drive Me) Crazy“	3	5	5	7	8	0	28	8th
8	Dundi	Led Zeppelin	„Whole Lotta Love“	9	10	9	5	20	15	68	2nd
9	Viktor	Prince	„Purple Rain“	11	11	11	11	22	35	101	1st

Bonus points

- Aleks Raeva gave five points to Dundi
- Ivo Dimchev gave five points to Viktor
- Emilia gave five points to Viktor
- Boris gave five points to Viktor
- Babinova gave five points to Viktor
- Plamena gave five points to Dundi
- Simona gave five points to Viktor
- Dundi gave five points to Aleks Raeva
- Viktor gave five points to Dundi
- The mentors gave ten points to Viktor

=== Week 2 (February 23) ===
Order	Contestant	Performing as	Song	Points						Total	Result
Order	Contestant	Performing as	Song	Vesko	Funky	Hilda	Azis	Public	Bonus	Total	Result
1	Dundi	Carrapicho	„Tic, Tic Tac“	3	4	3	3	14	0	27	8th
2	Plamena	Montserrat Caballe	„O mio babbino caro“	4	5	4	5	6	0	24	9th
3	Boris	Cher	„Strong Enough“	7	11	10	7	12	5	52	4th
4	Simona	Barbara Pravi	„Voilà“	10	7	9	10	20	20	76	2nd
5	Emilia	Nirvana	„Smells Like Teen Spirit“	9	3	6	11	10	15	54	3rd
6	Viktor	MC Hammer	„U Can't Touch This“	5	8	5	6	18	0	42	6th
7	Babinova	Anelia	„Samo mene nyamash“	8	6	7	8	16	0	45	5th
8	Aleks Raeva	Philipp Kirkorov	„Diva“	6	10	8	4	8	0	36	7th
9	Ivo Dimchev	Édith Piaf	„Non, je ne regrette rien“	11	9	11	9	22	15	77	1st

Bonus points

- Dundi gave five points to Ivo Dimchev
- Plamena gave five points to Ivo Dimchev
- Boris gave five points to Simona
- Simona gave five points to Ivo Dimchev
- Emilia gave five points to Boris
- Viktor gave five points to Emilia
- Babinova gave five points to Simona
- Aleks Raeva gave five points to Emilia
- Ivo Dimchev gave five points to Emilia
- The mentors gave ten points to Simona

=== Week 3: Bulgarian Songs Night (March 2) ===
Order	Contestant	Performing as	Song	Points						Total	Result
Order	Contestant	Performing as	Song	Vesko	Funky	Hilda	Azis	Public	Bonus	Total	Result
1	Plamena	Margarita Hranova	„Dalechna pesen“	4	7	7	6	8	0	32	7th
2	Simona	Vanya Kostova	„Neka buda tvoyata esen“	5	6	8	8	12	0	39	6th
3	Emilia	Lili Ivanova	„Za tebe byah“	10	8	10	10	18	10	66	3rd
4	Boris	Veselin Marinov	„Rozhden den“	7	4	3	3	10	0	27	8th
5	Ivo Dimchev	Emil Dimitrov	„Moya strana, moya Bulgaria“	11	11	11	11	22	20	86	1st
6	Dundi	Maria Kehayova	„Zaspal Gocho pod salkum“	6	5	5	5	16	5	42	5th
7	Babinova	Silvia Katsarova	„Obicham te“	3	3	4	4	6	0	20	9th
8	Viktor	Ivana	„Praznik vseki den“	8	9	6	7	14	0	44	4th
9	Aleks Raeva	Katya Filipova	„Nezabrava“	9	10	9	9	20	20	77	2nd

Bonus points

- Plamena gave five points to Ivo Dimchev
- Simona gave five points to Emilia
- Emilia gave five points to Dundi
- Boris gave five points to Emilia
- Ivo Dimchev gave five points to Aleks Raeva
- Dundi gave five points to Aleks Raeva
- Babinova gave five points to Aleks Raeva
- Viktor gave five points to Aleks Raeva
- Aleks Raeva gave five points to Ivo Dimchev
- The mentors gave ten points to Ivo Dimchev

=== Week 4 (March 9) ===
Order	Contestant	Performing as	Song	Points						Total	Result
Order	Contestant	Performing as	Song	Vesko	Funky	Hilda	Azis	Public	Bonus	Total	Result
1	Viktor	Village People	„Y.M.C.A.“	4	8	5	3	8	0	28	7th
2	Plamena	System of a Down	„Chop Suey!“	11	11	10	7	20	10	69	2nd
3	Boris	Eros Ramazotti	„Se bastasse una canzone“	3	5	4	4	10	0	26	8th
4	Dundi	Petar Chernev	„Zaklinanie“	8	4	6	6	14	0	38	6th
5	Aleks Raeva	Taylor Dayne	„I'll Be Your Shelter“	7	7	7	9	12	5	47	4th
6	Simona	Ritchie Valens	„La Bamba“	5	3	3	8	6	0	25	9th
7	Emilia	Binka Dobreva	„Danyova mama“	9	6	8	10	22	5	60	3rd
8	Ivo Dimchev	Mile Kitić	„Plava ciganka“	6	9	9	5	16	0	45	5th
9	Babinova	Anne Hathaway	„I Dreamed a Dream“	10	10	11	11	18	35	95	1st

Bonus points

- Viktor gave five points to Babinova
- Plamena gave five points to Aleks Raeva
- Boris gave five points to Babinova
- Dundi gave five points to Plamena
- Aleks Raeva gave five points to Babinova
- Simona gave five points to Babinova
- Emilia gave five points to Babinova
- Ivo Dimchev gave five points to Plamena
- Babinova gave five points to Emilia
- The mentors gave ten points to Babinova

=== Week 5 (March 16) ===
Order	Contestant	Performing as	Song	Points						Total	Result
Order	Contestant	Performing as	Song	Vesko	Funky	Hilda	Azis	Public	Bonus	Total	Result
1	Dundi	Bonnie Tyler	„Total Eclipse of the Heart“	11	10	11	8	22	20	82	1st
2	Ivo Dimchev	Elina Garanca	„L'amour est un oiseau rebelle“	9	9	4	3	16	0	41	5th
3	Plamena	Desi Slava & Azis	„Kazvash, che me obichash“	6	6	6	9	8	5	40	6th
4	Viktor	Freddie Mercury of Queen	„Don't Stop Me Now“	3	7	7	4	12	0	33	7th
5	Emilia	100 Kila & Lora Karadzhova	„Tsyala nosht“	8	3	8	10	14	10	53	4th
6	Boris	Miley Cyrus	„Midnight Sky“	5	4	5	5	6	0	25	9th
7	Babinova	Rihanna	„Umbrella“	4	5	3	7	10	0	29	8th
8	Aleks Raeva	Ivo Dimchev	„Banitsa“	7	8	9	6	18	10	58	3rd
9	Simona	Elaine Paige	„Memory“	10	11	10	11	20	10	72	2nd

Bonus points

- Dundi gave five points to Emilia
- Ivo Dimchev gave five points to Aleks Raeva
- Plamena gave five points to Simona
- Viktor gave five points to Dundi
- Emilia gave five points to Aleks Raeva
- Boris gave five points to Simona
- Babinova gave five points to Plamena
- Aleks Raeva gave five points to Dundi
- Simona gave five points to Emilia
- The mentors gave ten points to Dundi

=== Week 6 (March 23) ===
Order	Contestant	Performing as	Song	Points						Total	Result
Order	Contestant	Performing as	Song	Vesko	Funky	Hilda	Azis	Public	Bonus	Total	Result
1	Simona	Lady Gaga	„Born This Way“	4	6	5	6	10	0	31	8th
2	Dundi	Bryan Adams	„(Everything I Do) I Do It for You“	7	10	9	7	18	0	51	3rd
3	Boris	Vasilis Karras	„Fenomeno“	10	11	11	10	22	15	79	2nd
4	Babinova	Adele	„Skyfall“	6	5	7	9	12	10	49	5th
5	Emilia	4 Non Blondes	„What's Up?“	9	7	6	8	16	5	51	4th
6	Ivo Dimchev	Volodya Stoyanov	„Den denuvam“	5	4	8	5	14	0	36	6th
7	Viktor	Gwen Stefani	„Rich Girl“	3	3	3	3	6	5	23	9th
8	Plamena	Haddaway	„What Is Love“	8	9	4	4	8	0	33	7th
9	Aleks Raeva	The Cranberries	„Ode to My Family“	11	8	10	11	20	20	80	1st

Bonus points

- Simona gave five points to Aleks Raeva
- Dundi gave five points to Babinova
- Boris gave five points to Aleks Raeva
- Babinova gave five points to Aleks Raeva
- Emilia gave five points to Viktor
- Ivo Dimchev gave five points to Boris
- Viktor gave five points to Emilia
- Plamena gave five points to Aleks Raeva
- Aleks Raeva gave five points to Babinova
- The mentors gave ten points to Boris

=== Week 7 (March 30) ===
Order	Contestant	Performing as	Song	Points						Total	Result
Order	Contestant	Performing as	Song	Vesko	Funky	Hilda	Azis	Public	Bonus	Total	Result
1	Dundi	Måneskin	„Beggin'“	5	6	6	9	18	5	49	5th
2	Plamena	Christina Aguilera	„Show Me How You Burlesque“	7	9	9	8	8	10	51	3rd
3	Boris	Tommy Cash	„Espresso Macchiato“	6	8	8	7	16	5	50	4th
4	Emilia	Raye	„Where Is My Husband!“	10	10	11	11	20	10	72	2nd
5	Ivo Dimchev	Sam Smith	„Lay Me Down“	8	4	4	4	12	0	32	8th
6	Simona	Georgi Stanchev	„Ti uzhasno zakusnya“	3	3	3	3	6	0	18	9th
7	Babinova	Tarkan	„Dudu“	4	5	5	6	10	5	35	7th
8	Aleks Raeva	Emilia & Florin Salam	„Turbolentsiya“	11	11	10	10	22	20	84	1st
9	Viktor	Medi	„Da si tuk“	9	7	7	5	14	0	42	6th

Bonus points

- Dundi gave five points to Boris
- Plamena gave five points to Emilia
- Boris gave five points to Plamena
- Emilia gave five points to Aleks Raeva
- Ivo Dimchev gave five points to Babinova
- Simona gave five points to Aleks Raeva
- Babinova gave five points to Dundi
- Aleks Raeva gave five points to Emilia
- Viktor gave five points to Plamena
- The mentors gave ten points to Aleks Raeva

=== Week 8: Duets Night (April 6) ===
Order	Contestant	Duet partner	Performing as	Song	Points						Total	Result
Order	Contestant	Duet partner	Performing as	Song	Vesko	Funky	Hilda	Azis	Public	Bonus	Total	Result
1	Boris	Mihaela Fileva	Vasil Naydenov & Silvia Katsarova	„Ogun ot lyubov“	9	10	10	9	18	5	61	2nd
2	Babinova	Vladimir Zombori	KariZma	„Kolko mi lipsvash“	3	3	3	4	6	0	19	9th
3	Viktor	Orlin Pavlov	Ed Sheeran & Tom Jones	„Kiss“	4	5	4	3	8	0	24	8th
4	Dundi	Magi Dzhanavarova	U2 & Mary J. Blige	„One“	6	6	5	7	12	5	41	6th
5	Ivo Dimchev	Fiki	Toni Storaro & Fiki	„Kazhi mi kato muzh“	5	4	6	5	14	0	34	7th
6	Plamena	Darin Angelov	Olivia Newton-John & John Travolta	„You're the One That I Want“	7	9	8	6	10	5	45	5th
7	Aleks Raeva	Raffi Boghosyan	Cher & Eros Ramazotti	„Più che puoi“	10	11	9	8	16	0	54	3rd
8	Emilia	Veniamin	Gloria & Azis	„Ne sme bezgreshni“	8	8	7	11	20	0	54	4th
9	Simona	Mihaela Marinova	Mariah Carey & Whitney Houston	„When You Believe“	11	7	11	10	22	30	91	1st

Bonus points

- Boris gave five points to Dundi
- Babinova gave five points to Simona
- Viktor gave five points to Simona
- Dundi gave five points to Simona
- Ivo Dimchev gave five points to Simona
- Plamena gave five points to Simona
- Aleks Raeva gave five points to Simona
- Emilia gave five points to Plamena
- Simona gave five points to Boris

As Mihaela Marinova was part of the guest duet partners, the mentors did not give their bonus 10 points.

=== Week 9 (April 20) ===
Order	Contestant	Performing as	Song	Points						Total	Result
Order	Contestant	Performing as	Song	Vesko	Funky	Hilda	Azis	Public	Bonus	Total	Result
1	Simona	Aretha Franklin	„Think“	9	8	9	8	10	0	44	4th
2	Emilia	Krasimir Radkov	„Zhik-tak“	5	6	6	7	14	0	38	6th
3	Plamena	Bon Jovi	„Always“	8	7	7	6	8	5	41	5th
4	Boris	Bananarama	„Venus“	10	9	10	10	16	25	80	1st
5	Ivo Dimchev	Todor Kolev	„Chistachkite“	3	4	3	4	18	5	37	7th
6	Babinova	Evanescence	„Bring Me to Life“	6	11	8	9	20	10	64	3rd
7	Aleks Raeva	Veselin Marinov	„Edin mig ot raya“	7	3	5	5	6	0	26	9th
8	Dundi	Mila Robert	„Pokemon“	11	10	11	11	22	10	75	2nd
9	Viktor	Bruno Mars	„When I Was Your Man“	4	5	4	3	12	0	28	8th

Bonus points

- Simona gave five points to Babinova
- Emilia gave five points to Ivo Dimchev
- Plamena gave five points to Dundi
- Boris gave five points to Plamena
- Ivo Dimchev gave five points to Boris
- Babinova gave five points to Dundi
- Aleks Raeva gave five points to Boris
- Dundi gave five points to Babinova
- Viktor gave five points to Boris
- The mentors gave ten points to Boris

=== Week 10 (April 27) ===
Order	Contestant	Performing as	Song	Points						Total	Result
Order	Contestant	Performing as	Song	Vesko	Funky	Hilda	Azis	Public	Bonus	Total	Result
1	Aleks Raeva	Technotronic	„Pump Up the Jam“	5	8	9	9	10	0	41	5th
2	Dundi	Cheb Khaled	„Aïcha“	7	4	6	7	14	0	38	6th
3	Emilia	Dara Ekimova	„Disham“	9	10	11	11	20	10	71	2nd
4	Simona	Aerosmith	„I Don't Want to Miss a Thing“	3	5	5	8	12	5	38	7th
5	Plamena	Shakira	„Objection (Tango)“	8	11	3	3	6	0	31	8th
6	Boris	Vasil Mihaylov	„Rufinka bolna legnala“	11	9	7	4	22	20	73	1st
7	Babinova	Mihaela Fileva	„Incognito“	4	3	4	6	8	5	30	9th
8	Viktor	Luciano Pavarotti	„Una furtiva lagrima“	6	6	8	5	16	5	46	4th
9	Ivo Dimchev	Toni Braxton	„He Wasn't Man Enough“	10	7	10	10	18	10	65	3rd

Bonus points

- Aleks Raeva gave five points to Boris
- Dundi gave five points to Boris
- Emilia gave five points to Simona
- Simona gave five points to Boris
- Plamena gave five points to Boris
- Boris gave five points to Viktor
- Babinova gave five points to Ivo Dimchev
- Viktor gave five points to Ivo Dimchev
- Ivo Dimchev gave five points to Babinova
- The mentors gave ten points to Emilia

=== Week 11 (May 11) ===
Special guest was Julian Kostov who performed as Eminem with his song „The Real Slim Shady“.

Order	Contestant	Performing as	Song	Points						Total	Result
Order	Contestant	Performing as	Song	Vesko	Funky	Hilda	Azis	Public	Bonus	Total	Result
1	Boris	The Prodigy	„Firestarter“	3	5	8	6	10	5	37	7th
2	Dundi	Britney Spears	„Oops!... I Did It Again“	10	10	4	4	16	5	49	5th
3	Simona	Lara Fabian	„Je suis malade“	5	4	6	8	12	0	35	8th
4	Viktor	Janet Jackson	„Scream“	11	11	10	7	18	25	82	1st
5	Emilia	Sofi Marinova	„Bez teb“	7	8	7	11	22	5	60	3rd
6	Plamena	Beyoncé	„Listen“	8	7	5	5	8	5	38	6th
7	Ivo Dimchev	Ray Charles	„Georgia on My Mind/Hit the Road Jack“	9	9	11	10	20	5	64	2nd
8	Babinova	Enrique Iglesias	„Hero“	4	3	3	3	6	0	19	9th
9	Aleks Raeva	Dara	„Bangaranga“	6	6	9	9	14	5	49	4th

Bonus points

- Boris gave five points to Emilia
- Dundi gave five points to Viktor
- Simona gave five points to Viktor
- Viktor gave five points to Dundi
- Emilia gave five points to Aleks Raeva
- Plamena gave five points to Ivo Dimchev
- Ivo Dimchev gave five points to Plamena
- Babinova gave five points to Boris
- Aleks Raeva gave five points to Viktor
- The mentors gave ten points to Viktor

=== Week 12: Final (May 18) ===
Order	Contestant	Performing as	Song	Result
1	Babinova	Lady Gaga	„Bad Romance“	Finalist
2	Plamena	Lili Ivanova	„Camino“	Finalist
3	Viktor	James Brown	„It's a Man's Man's Man's World/I Got You (I Feel Good)“	Finalist
4	Simona	Christina Aguilera	„Hurt“	Finalist
5	Boris	Elvis Presley	„Unchained Melody“	Finalist
6	Dundi	AC/DC	„Highway to Hell“	Winner
7	Ivo Dimchev	Vasil Naydenov	„Sbogom moya lyubov“	Third place
8	Aleks Raeva	Madonna	„Hung Up“	Finalist
9	Emilia	Pasha Hristova	„Edna bulgarska roza“	Runner-up

In the final, only the public voted and chose the winner.
