= Dancing Stars (Bulgarian TV series) =

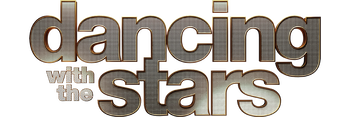
- Presented by: Radost Draganova; Todor Kolev; Elena Petrova; Dimitar Pavlov; Aleksandra Sarchadjieva; Krasimir Rankov; Nikol Stankulova; Kalin Sarmenov; Magi Zhelyazkova; Aleksandra Raeva; Krasimir Radkov; Stanislava Gancheva
- Judges: Galena Velikova; Vladimir Bozhilov; Neshka Robeva; Pambous Agapiu; Maria Gigova; Iliana Raeva; Vera Marinova; Kalin Sarmenov; Alfredo Torres; Hristo Mutafchiev; Frantsiska Yordanova - Papkala; Tomash Papkala
- Country of origin: Bulgaria
- No. of seasons: 5

Production
- Producers: Old School Productions (2008, 2013-2014); 7/8 Productions (2009); FX Camera (2024)
- Production locations: Sofia, Bulgaria

Original release
- Network: bTV (2008-2009, 2024); NOVA (2013-2014)
- Release: 22 September 2008

Related
- VIP Dance

Dancing Stars is the Bulgarian version of the British reality TV competition Strictly Come Dancing and is part of the Dancing with the Stars franchise. The first season of the show started on 22 September 2008 and was aired on bTV. The first season of the show was hosted by Radost Draganova and Todor Kolev. It aired from Monday to Thursday with two live shows, on Monday (main show) and Thursday (results show) and two background episodes on Tuesday and Wednesday. Dancing Stars 1 was produced by Old School Productions and proved to be a huge success reaching an average audience share of over 40%, beating Nova Television's Big Brother 4.

It is also called Dancing Stars on Austrian television and draws a comparable audience.

== Seasons overview ==
Season	TV channel	Episodes	Start	Final	Winner
1	bTV	52	22 September 2008	15 December 2008	Orlin Pavlov
2	bTV	26	27 September 2009	14 December 2009	Bianka Panova
3	NOVA	26	11 March 2013	7 June 2013	Angel Kovachev
4	NOVA	26	11 March 2014	5 June 2014	Albena Denkova
5	bTV	26	20 February 2024	14 May 2024	Nedelya Shtonova

== Cast ==
Host	Dancing Stars: Extra host	Contestant	Judge

Presenter	Season				
Presenter	1	2	3	4	5
Radost Draganova					
Todor Kolev					
Elena Petrova					
Dimitar Pavlov					
Aleksandra Sarchadjieva					
Krasimir Rankov					
Nikol Stankulova					
Kalin Sarmenov					
Magi Zhelyazkova					
Aleksandra Raeva					
Krasimir Radkov					
Stanislava Gancheva					

Judge	Season				
Judge	1	2	3	4	5
Galena Velikova					
Vladimir Bozhilov					
Neshka Robeva					
Iliana Raeva					
Pambous Agapiu					
Maria Gigova					
Vera Marinova					
Alfredo Torres					
Kalin Sarmenov					
Hristo Mutafchiev					
Frantsiska Yordanova - Papkala					
Tomash Papkala					

Line-up of judges
Season	Judges			
1	Galena Velikova	Vladimir Bozhilov	Neshka Robeva	
2	Pambous Agapiu	Maria Gigova	Iliana Raeva	Vera Marinova
3	Galena Velikova	Kalin Sarmenov	Iliana Raeva	Alfredo Torres
4	Hristo Mutafchiev	Galena Velikova	Iliana Raeva	Alfredo Torres
5	Frantsiska Yordanova - Papkala	Tomash Papkala	Galena Velikova	Iliana Raeva

=== Professional dancers and their partners ===
Professional dancers	Season 1	Season 2	Season 3	Season 4	Season 5
Alexander Dokulevski	Antoaneta Dobreva-Neti	—N/a			
Alexander Popov	Elena Yoncheva	—N/a			
Ani Doncheva	Andrey Batashov	—N/a		Darin Angelov	Papi Hans
Atanas Gendov	Alisia	—N/a			
Atanas Mesechkov	Violeta Markovska	—N/a	Stella Angelova	Neli Atanasova	Nedelya Shtonova
Elena Dobrikova	Georgi Mamalev	—N/a	Deyan Slavchev-Deo	Uti Buchvarov	—N/a
Irena Dimitrova	Niki Kanchev	—N/a			
Lili Velichkova	Bozhidar Iskrenov-Gibona	—N/a	Itso Hazarta	—N/a	
Petya Dimitrova	Georgi Kostadinov	Todor Kirkov	Lyusi Ilarionov	Encho Danailov	—N/a
Rangel Spirov	Anya Pencheva	—N/a			
Svetlin Dimitrov	Galena	—N/a	Gloria	Mihaela Fileva	—N/a
Trendafil Surmov	Iliana Raeva	—N/a	Latinka Petrova	—N/a	
Valentina Nedeva	Kostadin Georgiev-Kalki	—N/a			
Yana Akimova	Orlin Pavlov	—N/a	Petko Dimitrov	—N/a	
Alexander Vachev	—N/a	Madlen Algafari	—N/a		
Elena Ilieva	—N/a	Krasimir Radkov	—N/a		
Georgi Mihov	—N/a	Stanislava Gancheva	—N/a		
Iliyan Chakurov	—N/a	Veneta Harizanova	—N/a		
Iva Grigorova	—N/a	Etien Levi	—N/a		
Maria Agapiu	—N/a	Krum Savov	—N/a		
Nikolay Manolov	—N/a	Kristina Dimitrova	—N/a		
Pavlina Vulcheva	—N/a	Miodrag Ivanov	—N/a		
Pavlina Vulcheva	—N/a	Georgi Milchev-Godji	—N/a		
Stoyan Stoyanov	—N/a	Aksinia Chenkova	—N/a		
Svetoslav Vasilev	—N/a	Bianka Panova	—N/a		
Yulia Andonova	—N/a	Grafa	—N/a		
Dorina Stoyanova	—N/a		Angel Kovachev	Anton Kasabov	Valeri Grigorov
Ekaterina Draganova-Keti	—N/a		Detelin Dalakliev	—N/a	
Georgi Ganev	—N/a		Kapka Georgieva	—N/a	
Jivko Ivanov	—N/a		Natalia Kobilkina	—N/a	
Jivko Ivanov	—N/a		Andrea	—N/a	
Kaloyan Ivanov	—N/a		Elen Koleva	Albena Denkova	Boryana Batashova
Kaloyan Ivanov	—N/a		Elen Koleva	Albena Denkova	Emanuela
Petyo Stefanov	—N/a		Zeyneb Madzhurova	Albena Mihova	—N/a
Ralitsa Merdzhanova	—N/a		Rumen Lukanov	Venzy	Filip Bukov
Dean Stefanov	—N/a			Elena Georgieva	—N/a
Elena Merdzhanova	—N/a			Milko Kalaidjiev	Daniel Peev-Dundi
Mihaela Pavlova	—N/a			Marian Kyurpanov	Viktor Stoyanov
Miroslav Milev	—N/a			Nana Gladuish	—N/a
Simeon Timov	—N/a			Aleksandra Zhekova	—N/a
Todor Atanasov	—N/a			Mika Stoichkova	Ivet Goranova
Daniel Denev	—N/a				Nona Yotova
Dimitar Georgiev-Jimmy	—N/a				Dara
Dimitar Stefanin	—N/a				Natali Trifonova
Ivan Karastoyanov	—N/a				Emanuela
Kristian Yordanov	—N/a				Mila Robert
Tanya Baltova	—N/a				Serafim Todorov
Veselina Daneva	—N/a				Emrah Storaro
Yovita Georgieva	—N/a				Svilen Noev

Key:

Winner
Runner-up
Third place
Fourth place
Fifth place
First elimination of the series
Withdrew from the series

== Season 1 ==
=== Judges ===
- Vladimir Bozhilov
- Galena Velikova
- Neshka Robeva

=== Contestants ===
- Orlin Pavlov – Pop singer & Actor (Winner)
- Violeta Markovska – Actress (Runner-up)
- Neti – Actress & Pop singer (Third place)
- Iliana Raeva – Ex-gymnast (Fourth place)
- Elena Yoncheva – Journalist
- Anya Pencheva – Actress
- Georgi Mamalev – Actor
- Bozhidar Iskrenov – Former football player
- Alisia – Pop-folk singer
- Andrey Batashov – Actor
- Galena – Pop-folk singer
- Niki Kunchev – TV host
- Kostadin Georgiev-Kalki – Musician & Dentist
- Georgi Kostadinov – Winner of Survivor BG 2

== Season 2 ==
=== Judges ===
- Iliana Raeva
- Pambous Agapiu
- Vera Marinova
- Maria Gigova

=== Contestants ===
- Bianka Panova – World Gymnastics Champion (Winner)
- Krasimir Radkov – Actor (Runner-up)
- Georgi Milchev-Godji – Musician (Third place)
- Etien Levi – Singer & Music teacher (Fourth place)
- Madlen Algafari – Psychologist (Fifth place)
- Aksinia Chenkova – Pop singer
- Stanislava Gancheva – TV host
- Grafa – Pop singer
- Veneta Harizanova – Model
- Todor Kirkov – Sport journalist & TV anchor
- Krum Savov – Sport journalist & TV host
- Kristina Dimitrova – Pop singer
- Miodrag Ivanov – Showman

== Season 3 ==
=== Judges ===
- Alfredo Torres
- Kalin Sarmenov
- Galena Velikova
- Iliana Raeva

=== Contestants ===
- Angel Kovachev – Hip-hop singer (Winner)
- Stela Angelova – Stunt man & Former competitor in rhythmic gymnastics (Runner-up)
- Elen Koleva – Actress (Third place)
- Deo – Singer & TV host (Fourth place)
- Petko Dimitrov – Businessman
- Gloria – Pop-folk singer
- Rumen Lukanov – TV host
- Lyusi Ilarionov – Director & Singer
- Latinka Petrova – Actress
- Itso Hazarta – Rap singer
- Andrea – Pop-folk singer
- Detelin Dalakliev – Boxer
- Kapka Georgieva – Politician
- Natalya Kobilkina – Sexologist
- Zeyneb Madjurova – Co-host

== Season 4 ==
=== Judges ===
- Alfredo Torres
- Hristo Mutafchiev
- Galena Velikova
- Iliana Raeva

=== Contestants ===
- Albena Denkova – Former competitor in figure skating (Winner)
- Mihaela Fileva – Pop singer (Runner-up)
- Darin Angelov – Actor
- Neli Atanasova – TV Host & former rhythmic gymnastics
- Anton Kasabov – Actor & martial arts
- Elena Georgieva – Decorator & participant in Big Brother 2
- Nana Gladuish – TV host
- Aleksandra Zhekova – Snowboarder
- Venzy – Rap singer
- Albena Mihova – Actress
- Uti Bachvarov – TV host
- Mihaela (Mika) Stoichkova – Sport journalist & fashion designer. Daughter of Hristo Stoichkov.
- Marian Kyurpanov – Model & Actor
- Milko Kalaidjiev – Pop-folk singer
- Encho Danailov – Actor & TV host

== Season 5 ==
=== Judges ===
- Francisca Yordanova – Papkala
- Iliana Raeva
- Galena Velikova
- Tomas Papkala

=== Contestants ===
- Nedelya Shtonova – TV host (Winner)
- Dara – Pop singer (Runner-up)
- Natali Trifonova – TV host (Third place)
- Ivet Goranova – Olympic karate champion (Fourth place)
- Papi Hans – Pop singer & Writer
- Valeri Grigorov – Stuntman & participant in Desafío
- Viktor Stoyanov – Fitness instructor & participant in The Bachelor
- Emrah – Pop-folk singer
- Mila Robert – Pop singer
- Emanuela – Pop-folk singer
- Daniel Peev – Dundi – Actor
- Filip Bukov – Actor
- Svilen Noev – Musician
- Nona Yotova – Actress & Politician
- Serafim Todorov – Boxer
- Boryana Batashova – Actress & Singer

== See also ==
- Dancing with the Stars
