= Dancing Stars (Bulgarian TV series) season 5 =

Dancing Stars
- Season 5
- Hosted by: Aleksandra Raeva; Krasimir Radkov; Stanislava Gancheva (Dancing Stars: Extra)
- Judges: Frantsiska Yordanova - Papkala; Tomash Papkala; Galena Velikova; Iliana Raeva
- Celebrity winner: Nedelya Shtonova
- Professional winner: Atanas Mesechkov
- No. of episodes: 13 + 13 (Dancing Stars: Extra)

Release
- Original network: bTV
- Original release: February 20 – May 17, 2024

Season chronology
- ← Previous; Season 4

The fifth season of Bulgarian dancing reality competition Dancing Stars premiered on February 20, 2024, on bTV. The show returned nine years after the last season aired. The new hosts were Aleksandra Raeva and Krasimir Radkov and the judges were Galena Velikova, Iliana Raeva, Frantsiska Yordanova - Papkala and Tomash Papkala. The show aired each Tuesday from 20:00 to 23:00 and the companion show "Dancing Stars: Extra" aired each Friday from 22:30 to 23:00.

Nedelya Shtonova was crowned as the winner with her professional partner Atanas Mesechkov on May 14, 2024.

== Cast ==
This season presented new hosts on January 24, 2024 – actress and TV host Aleksandra Raeva and comedian and actor Krasimir Radkov, who also finished as runner-up on the second season of the show. This season introduced the companion show "Dancing Stars: Extra", hosted by actress and TV host Stanislava Gancheva (who is also Radkov's spouse and also participated on the second season of the show), which featured backstage interviews with the participants and other people involved with the show.

The celebrities were revealed on January 30 – the women consisted of TV hosts Nedelya Shtonova and Natali Trifonova, pop singers Dara and Mila Robert, pop-folk singer Emanuela, Olympic karate champion Ivet Goranova and actresses Nona Yotova and Boryana Batashova (wife of the former Andrey Batashov, who participated in the first season), while the male part of the cast included actors Filip Bukov and Daniel Peev – Dundi, pop singer Papi Hans, stuntman Valeri Grigorov, fitness instructor Viktor Stoyanov, boxer Serafim Todorov, musician Svilen Noev and pop-folk singer Emrah Storaro.

The jury was revealed on February 4 to consist of returning judges from the previous season Galena Velikova and Iliana Raeva, who were joined by dancing professionalists and family Frantsiska Yordanova - Papkala and Tomash Papkala.

The professional partners included returning dancers Ani Doncheva, Atanas Mesechkov, Dorina Stoyanova, Kaloyan Ivanov, sisters Ralitsa Merdzhanova and Elena Merdzhanova, Mihaela Pavlova and Todor Atanasov and also Daniel Denev, Dimitar Georgiev – Jimmy, Dimitar Stefanin, Ivan Karastoyanov, Kristian Yordanov, Tanya Baltova, Veselina Daneva and Yovita Georgieva.

== Format ==
Each week all of the participants would perform their dance and would be scored by the judges on a scale from 1 to 10 and by the viewers who voted via SMS. Then the scores would be converted in two rankings with the couple that got the lowest score getting 1 point and the best scoring couple getting the maximum points for the night, depending of the number of the couples left on the show. The points from both rankings would then be combined and the couple with the least points would be eliminated.

From the eight week the two couples with the least votes would participate in an elimination duel, where only the viewers voted. The couple who got the least amount of votes from the public would get eliminated.

== Contestants ==
№	Celebrity	Notability	Professional partner	Result
1	Nedelya Shtonova	TV host	Atanas Mesechkov	Winners on 14 May 2024
2	Dara	Pop singer	Dimitar Georgiev – Jimmy	Runners-up on 14 May 2024
3	Natali Trifonova	TV host	Dimitar Stefanin	Third place on 14 May 2024
4	Ivet Goranova	Olympic karate champion	Todor Atanasov	Fourth place on 14 May 2024
5	Papi Hans	Pop singer & writer	Ani Doncheva	Eliminated 12th on 7 May 2024
6	Valeri Grigorov	Stuntman & participant in Desafío Bulgaria 4	Dorina Stoyanova – Kovacheva	Eliminated 11th on 7 May 2024
7	Viktor Stoyanov	Fitness instructor & participant in The Bachelor Bulgaria 1	Mihaela Pavlova	Eliminated 10th on 30 April 2024
8	Emrah Storaro	Pop-folk singer	Veselina Daneva	Eliminated 9th on 23 April 2024
9	Mila Robert	Pop singer & actress	Kristian Yordanov	Eliminated 8th on 9 April 2024
10	Emanuela	Pop-folk singer	Ivan Karastoyanov (Weeks 1–3); Kaloyan Ivanov (Weeks 4–7)	Eliminated 7th on 2 April 2024
11	Daniel Peev – Dundi	Actor	Elena Merdzhanova	Eliminated 6th on 26 March 2024
12	Filip Bukov	Actor	Ralitsa Merdzhanova	Eliminated 5th on 19 March 2024
13	Svilen Noev	Musician	Yovita Georgieva	Eliminated 4th on 12 March 2024
14	Nona Yotova	Actress, singer & former politician	Daniel Denev	Eliminated 3rd on 5 March 2024
15	Serafim Todorov	Boxer	Tanya Baltova	Eliminated 2nd on 27 February 2024
16	Boryana Batashova	Actress & singer	Kaloyan Ivanov	Eliminated 1st on 20 February 2024

== Scoring chart ==
The highest score each week is indicated in bold green with a dagger (†), while the lowest score each week is indicated in italicized red with a double-dagger (‡).

Color key:

Winners
Runners-up
Third place
Fourth place
Bottom two or three
Eliminated

Dancing Stars season 5 – Weekly scores
Couple	Pl.	Week													
Couple	Pl.	1	2	3	4	5	6	7	8	9	10	9+10	11	12	13
Nedelya & Atanas	1st	25	26	26	32	35	33	32‡	**39**†	30+38=68	32	100	35+7=42	36+5=41‡	39+39=78‡
Dara & Jimmy	2nd	29	30	**38**†	28	37	30	39	37	32+38=70	**40**†	110	37+6=43	40+5=**45**†	40+40=**80**†
Natali & Dimitar	3rd	23	27	34	31	36	39	38	38	35+38=73	39	112	40+3=43	40+5=**45**†	40+39=79
Ivet & Todor	4th	22	**32**†	27	29	**40**†	28	**40**†	36	33+40=73	37	110	40+2=42	38+5=43	38+40=78‡
Papi Hans & Ani	5th	**32**†	24	30	32	38	**40**†	**40**†	33	32+40=72	35	107	40+5=**45**†	38+5=43	
Valeri & Dorina	6th	23	24	31	30	29	**40**†	35	38	35+40=**75**†	38	**113**†	33+4=37‡	39+5=44	
Viktor & Mihaela	7th	22	21	32	27	33	28	**40**†	37	30+40=70	39	109	36+1=37‡		
Emrah & Veselina	8th	22	27	23	19‡	29	29	34	28‡	25+38=63‡	31‡	94‡			
Mila & Kristian	9th	27	22	27	25	32	35	32‡	30						
Emanuela & Ivan/Kaloyan	10th	20	27	23	**35**†	35	32	34							
Dundi & Elena	11th	22	20	28	29	27‡	24‡								
Filip & Ralitsa	12th	26	22	27	25	30									
Svilen & Yovita	13th	17	23	19‡	21										
Nona & Daniel	14th	20	23	21											
Serafim & Tanya	15th	23	12‡												
Boryana & Kaloyan	16th	11‡													

== Weekly scores ==
Individual judges scores in the chart below (given in parentheses) are listed in this order from left to right: Frantsiska Yordanova - Papkala, Tomash Papkala, Galena Velikova, Iliana Raeva.

=== Week 1: Premiere night (February 20) ===
Draw	Couple	Dance	Judges scores	Result
1.	Viktor & Mihaela	Foxtrot	22 (6, 6, 4, 6)	Safe
2.	Natali & Dimitar	Foxtrot	23 (5, 7, 5, 6)	Safe
3.	Boryana & Kaloyan	Cha-cha-cha	11 (2, 4, 2, 3)	Eliminated
4.	Nedelya & Atanas	Samba	25 (7, 6, 7, 5)	Safe
5.	Dundi & Elena	Samba	22 (6, 6, 5, 5)	Safe
6.	Emrah & Veselina	Viennese waltz	22 (5, 6, 5, 6)	Safe
7.	Emanuela & Ivan	Cha-cha-cha	20 (4, 6, 4, 6)	Safe
8.	Dara & Jimmy	Samba	29 (8, 7, 7, 7)	Safe
9.	Papi Hans & Ani	Viennese waltz	32 (8, 8, 8, 8)	Safe
10.	Nona & Daniel	Samba	20 (4, 5, 5, 6)	Safe
11.	Mila & Kristian	Cha-cha-cha	27 (7, 6, 7, 7)	Safe
12.	Svilen & Yovita	Cha-cha-cha	17 (4, 5, 4, 4)	Safe
13.	Ivet & Todor	Waltz	22 (5, 6, 5, 6)	Safe
14.	Serafim & Tanya	Cha-cha-cha	23 (5, 6, 5, 7)	Safe
15.	Valeri & Dorina	Cha-cha-cha	23 (5, 6, 5, 7)	Safe
16.	Filip & Ralitsa	Cha-cha-cha	26 (6, 7, 6, 7)	Safe

=== Week 2: Second night (February 27) ===
Draw	Couple	Dance	Judges scores	Result
1.	Papi Hans & Ani	Jive	24 (6, 6, 6, 6)	Safe
2.	Valeri & Dorina	Jive	24 (7, 6, 6, 5)	Safe
3.	Serafim & Tanya	Foxtrot	12 (2, 3, 3, 4)	Eliminated
4.	Dara & Jimmy	Jive	30 (8, 7, 8, 7)	Safe
5.	Nona & Daniel	Foxtrot	23 (6, 6, 5, 6)	Safe
6.	Dundi & Elena	Foxtrot	20 (5, 6, 4, 5)	Safe
7.	Natali & Dimitar	Jive	27 (7, 7, 6, 7)	Safe
8.	Emanuela & Ivan	Foxtrot	27 (6, 6, 8, 7)	Safe
9.	Filip & Ralitsa	Jive	22 (6, 6, 5, 5)	Safe
10.	Ivet & Todor	Jive	32 (8, 8, 8, 8)	Safe
11.	Nedelya & Atanas	Foxtrot	26 (6, 7, 6, 7)	Safe
12.	Svilen & Yovita	Foxtrot	23 (5, 6, 6, 6)	Safe
13.	Mila & Kristian	Jive	22 (5, 6, 5, 6)	Safe
14.	Emrah & Veselina	Foxtrot	27 (7, 7, 6, 7)	Safe
15.	Viktor & Mihaela	Jive	21 (5, 6, 4, 6)	Safe

=== Week 3: Movie night (March 5) ===
Draw	Couple	Dance	Judges scores	Result
1.	Emrah & Veselina	Freestyle	23 (5, 6, 6, 6)	Safe
2.	Dundi & Elena	Charleston	28 (7, 7, 7, 7)	Safe
3.	Viktor & Mihaela	Paso doble	32 (8, 8, 7, 9)	Safe
4.	Papi Hans & Ani	Cha-cha-cha	30 (7, 7, 8, 8)	Safe
5.	Nedelya & Atanas	Salsa	26 (6, 6, 7, 7)	Safe
6.	Nona & Daniel	Quickstep	21 (5, 5, 5, 6)	Eliminated
7.	Ivet & Todor	Samba	27 (6, 7, 7, 7)	Safe
8.	Natali & Dimitar	Quickstep	34 (9, 8, 8, 9)	Safe
9.	Svilen & Yovita	Paso doble	19 (4, 5, 5, 5)	Safe
10.	Mila & Kristian	Viennese waltz	27 (6, 6, 7, 8)	Safe
11.	Valeri & Dorina	Charleston	31 (7, 7, 8, 9)	Safe
12.	Emanuela & Ivan	Jive	23 (5, 6, 6, 6)	Safe
13.	Dara & Jimmy	Paso doble	38 (10, 9, 9, 10)	Safe
14.	Filip & Ralitsa	Quickstep	27 (7, 7, 7, 6)	Safe

=== Week 4: Latino night (March 12) ===
Draw	Couple	Dance	Judges scores	Result
1.	Mila & Kristian	Samba	25 (6, 6, 6, 7)	Safe
2.	Ivet & Todor	Salsa	29 (8, 7, 7, 7)	Safe
3.	Filip & Ralitsa	Mambo	25 (6, 6, 6, 7)	Safe
4.	Dara & Jimmy	Cha-cha-cha	28 (7, 7, 7, 7)	Safe
5.	Viktor & Mihaela	Salsa	27 (7, 6, 6, 8)	Safe
6.	Nedelya & Atanas	Cha-cha-cha	32 (8, 7, 8, 9)	Safe
7.	Natali & Dimitar	Rumba	31 (8, 8, 8, 7)	Safe
8.	Papi Hans & Ani	Salsa	32 (8, 8, 8, 8)	Safe
9.	Svilen & Yovita	Samba	21 (5, 6, 5, 5)	Eliminated
10.	Valeri & Dorina	Salsa	30 (8, 7, 7, 8)	Safe
11.	Emrah & Veselina	Cha-cha-cha	19 (4, 5, 4, 6)	Safe
12.	Dundi & Elena	Salsa	29 (7, 7, 7, 8)	Safe
13.	Emanuela & Kaloyan	Rumba	35 (8, 9, 9, 9)	Safe

=== Week 5: In the world and at us [Dances from around the world] (March 19) ===
Draw	Couple	Dance	Judges scores	Result
1.	Dundi & Elena	Indian dance	27 (7, 7, 6, 7)	Safe
2.	Viktor & Mihaela	Tango, sirtaki	33 (8, 8, 9, 8)	Safe
3.	Valeri & Dorina	African dance	29 (7, 8, 7, 7)	Safe
4.	Mila & Kristian	Foxtrot	32 (8, 8, 8, 8)	Safe
5.	Nedelya & Atanas	Bulgarian folk dance	35 (8, 9, 9, 9)	Safe
6.	Natali & Dimitar	Viennese waltz	36 (9, 9, 9, 9)	Safe
7.	Emrah & Veselina	Charleston	29 (7, 7, 7, 8)	Safe
8.	Dara & Jimmy	Foxtrot	37 (9, 9, 9, 10)	Safe
9.	Filip & Ralitsa	Indian dance	30 (7, 7, 8, 8)	Eliminated
10.	Papi Hans & Ani	Argentine tango	38 (10, 9, 9, 10)	Safe
11.	Emanuela & Kaloyan	Viennese waltz	35 (9, 8, 9, 9)	Safe
12.	Ivet & Todor	Bulgarian folk dance, paso doble	40 (10, 10, 10, 10)	Safe

=== Week 6: World hits (March 26) ===
Draw	Couple	Dance	Judges vote		Public vote		Total points	Result
Draw	Couple	Dance	Scores	Points	Percentage	Points	Total points	Result
1.	Ivet & Todor	Cha-cha-cha	28 (7, 7, 7, 7)	3	15,6%	10	13	Safe
2.	Dundi & Elena	Rumba, paso doble	24 (6, 6, 6, 6)	1	7,4%	6	7	Eliminated
3.	Emanuela & Kaloyan	Argentine tango	32 (8, 8, 8, 8)	6	6,6%	4	10	Safe
4.	Nedelya & Atanas	Viennese waltz	33 (8, 8, 9, 8)	7	16,3%	11	18	Safe
5.	Dara & Jimmy	Salsa	30 (7, 8, 7, 8)	5	14,7%	9	14	Safe
6.	Emrah & Veselina	Viennese waltz	29 (7, 7, 7, 8)	4	8,8%	8	12	Safe
7.	Viktor & Mihaela	Rumba	28 (7, 7, 6, 8)	3	8,7%	7	10	Safe
8.	Mila & Kristian	Tango	35 (9, 8, 9, 9)	8	5,8%	3	11	Safe
9.	Valeri & Dorina	Rumba	40 (10, 10, 10, 10)	11	5,1%	2	13	Safe
10.	Natali & Dimitar	Argentine tango	39 (10, 10, 9, 10)	9	6,9%	5	14	Safe
11.	Papi Hans & Ani	Charleston	40 (10, 10, 10, 10)	11	4,1%	1	12	Safe

=== Week 7: All trumps [Chosen dances] (April 2) ===
Draw	Couple	Dance	Judges vote		Public vote		Total points	Result
Draw	Couple	Dance	Scores	Points	Percentage	Points	Total points	Result
1.	Nedelya & Atanas	Showdance	32 (8, 8, 8, 8)	2	18,2%	10	12	Safe
2.	Emrah & Veselina	Street fusion	34 (8, 8, 9, 9)	4	10,2%	6	10	Safe
3.	Mila & Kristian	Showdance	32 (8, 8, 8, 8)	2	10,6%	7	9	Safe
4.	Valeri & Dorina	Hip-hop	35 (9, 8, 9, 9)	5	6,8%	3	8	Safe
5.	Ivet & Todor	Hip-hop	40 (10, 10, 10, 10)	10	7,8%	4	14	Safe
6.	Natali & Dimitar	Jazz	38 (9, 9, 10, 10)	6	5,8%	2	8	Safe
7.	Emanuela & Kaloyan	Freestyle	34 (9, 8, 8, 9)	4	4,6%	1	5	Eliminated
8.	Papi Hans & Ani	Foxtrot, jazz	40 (10, 10, 10, 10)	10	8,7%	5	15	Safe
9.	Viktor & Mihaela	Paso doble	40 (10, 10, 10, 10)	10	11,0%	8	18	Safe
10.	Dara & Jimmy	Showdance	39 (9, 10, 10, 10)	7	16,3%	9	16	Safe

=== Week 8: New round (April 9) ===
Draw	Couple	Dance	Judges vote		Public vote		Total points	Result
Draw	Couple	Dance	Scores	Points	Percentage	Points	Total points	Result
1.	Dara & Jimmy	Waltz	37 (10, 9, 9, 9)	6	8,2%	2	8	Safe
2.	Ivet & Todor	Charleston	36 (9, 9, 9, 9)	4	11,6%	7	11	Safe
3.	Natali & Dimitar	Salsa	38 (9, 10, 9, 10)	8	8,1%	1	9	Safe
4.	Emrah & Veselina	Jive	28 (7, 7, 7, 7)	1	10,9%	6	7	Bottom two
5.	Valeri & Dorina	Paso doble, samba	38 (9, 10, 9, 10)	8	8,9%	4	12	Safe
6.	Papi Hans & Ani	Paso doble	33 (8, 9, 8, 8)	3	13,4%	8	11	Safe
7.	Mila & Kristian	Paso doble	30 (7, 8, 8, 7)	2	9,8%	5	7	Bottom two
8.	Viktor & Mihaela	Ballet	37 (9, 9, 9, 10)	6	8,8%	3	9	Safe
9.	Nedelya & Atanas	Rumba	39 (10, 9, 10, 10)	9	20,3%	9	18	Safe
Elimination duel
1.	Mila & Kristian	Cha-cha-cha	Public vote: 49,1%					Eliminated
2.	Emrah & Veselina	Foxtrot	Public vote: 50,9%					Safe

=== Week 9: Dances for loved people (April 16) ===
Draw	Couple	Dance	Judges vote		Public vote		Total points
Draw	Couple	Dance	Scores	Points	Percentage	Points	Total points
1.	Natali & Dimitar	Contemporary	35 (8, 9, 9, 9) + 38 = 73	7	6,9%	3	10
2.	Ivet & Todor	Showdance	33 (8, 8, 8, 9) + 40 = 73	7	8,3%	4	11
3.	Dara & Jimmy	Contemporary	32 (8, 8, 8, 8) + 38 = 70	4	19,6%	7	11
4.	Papi Hans & Ani	Contemporary	32 (8, 8, 8, 8) + 40 = 72	5	13,5%	5	10
5.	Valeri & Dorina	Viennese waltz	35 (9, 8, 9, 9) + 40 = 75	8	4,8%	2	10
6.	Nedelya & Atanas	Contemporary	30 (7, 8, 7, 8) + 38 = 68	2	24,7%	8	10
7.	Emrah & Veselina	Contemporary	25 (6, 6, 6, 7) + 38 = 63	1	18,0%	6	7
8.	Viktor & Mihaela	Waltz	30 (7, 7, 8, 8) + 40 = 70	4	4,2%	1	5
Judges' challenge
1.	Team Past: Emrah & Veselina; Dara & Jimmy; Natali & Dimitar; Nedelya & Atanas	Viennese waltz	Judges scores: 38 (9, 9, 10, 10)				
2.	Team Future: Viktor & Mihaela; Valeri & Dorina; Ivet & Todor; Papi Hans & Ani	Tango, paso doble	Judges scores: 40 (10, 10, 10, 10)				

=== Week 10: Double bet [Outcome of the two-week battle] (April 23) ===
The final ranking was based on this and last week's results.

Draw	Couple	Dance	Judges vote		Public vote		Total points	Combined points	Result
Draw	Couple	Dance	Scores	Points	Percentage	Points	Total points	Combined points	Result
1.	Valeri & Dorina	Jazz	38 (10, 9, 9, 10)	5	6,4%	1	6	10 + 6 = 16	Bottom two
2.	Emrah & Veselina	Samba	31 (8, 7, 8, 8)	1	13,9%	6	7	7 + 7 = 14	Bottom two
3.	Papi Hans & Ani	Quickstep	35 (8, 9, 9, 9)	3	21,8%	8	11	10 + 11 = 21	Safe
4.	Natali & Dimitar	Samba	39 (10, 10, 9, 10)	7	6,7%	2	9	10 + 9 = 19	Safe
5.	Ivet & Todor	Argentine tango	37 (9, 9, 9, 10)	4	7,0%	3	7	11 + 7 = 18	Safe
6.	Viktor & Mihaela	Quickstep	39 (10, 9, 10, 10)	7	12,5%	5	12	5 + 12 = 17	Safe
7.	Nedelya & Atanas	Jive	32 (8, 8, 8, 8)	2	20,4%	7	9	10 + 9 = 19	Safe
8.	Dara & Jimmy	Argentine tango	40 (10, 10, 10, 10)	8	11,3%	4	12	11 + 12 = 23	Safe
Elimination duel
1.	Emrah & Veselina	Tango	Public vote: 19,1%						Eliminated
2.	Valeri & Dorina	Foxtrot	Public vote: 80,9%						Safe

=== Week 11: Quarterfinal (April 30) ===
Draw	Couple	Dance	Judges vote		Public vote		Total points	Result
Draw	Couple	Dance	Scores	Points	Percentage	Points	Total points	Result
1.	Nedelya & Atanas	Paso doble	35 (9, 9, 8, 9) + 7 = 42	4	31,3%	7	11	Safe
2.	Dara & Jimmy	Rumba	37 (9, 9, 9, 10) + 6 = 43	6	16,7%	6	12	Safe
3.	Valeri & Dorina	Quickstep	33 (8, 8, 8, 9) + 4 = 37	2	13,7%	5	7	Safe
4.	Natali & Dimitar	Paso doble	40 (10, 10, 10, 10) + 3 = 43	6	6,2%	1	7	Bottom two
5.	Viktor & Mihaela	Samba	36 (9, 9, 9, 9) + 1 = 37	2	10,6%	3	5	Bottom two
6.	Ivet & Todor	Foxtrot	40 (10, 10, 10, 10) + 2 = 42	4	11,3%	4	8	Safe
7.	Papi Hans & Ani	Samba	40 (10, 10, 10, 10) + 5 = 45	7	10,2%	2	9	Safe
Dance marathon
1.	Viktor & Mihaela	Salsa	Judges score: 1					
1.	Ivet & Todor	Jive	Judges score: 2					
1.	Natali & Dimitar	Bulgarian folk dance	Judges score: 3					
1.	Valeri & Dorina	Viennese waltz	Judges score: 4					
1.	Papi Hans & Ani	Viennese waltz	Judges score: 5					
1.	Dara & Jimmy	Hip-hop	Judges score: 6					
1.	Nedelya & Atanas	Hip-hop	Judges score: 7					
Elimination duel
1.	Natali & Dimitar	Argentine tango	Public vote: 56,3%					Safe
2.	Viktor & Mihaela	Paso doble	Public vote: 43,7%					Eliminated

=== Week 12: Semifinal (May 7) ===
Draw	Couple	Dance	Judges vote		Public vote		Total points	Result
Draw	Couple	Dance	Scores	Points	Percentage	Points	Total points	Result
1.	Papi Hans & Ani	Rumba	38 (10, 9, 9, 10) + 5 = 43	3	11,5%	2	5	Bottom three
2.	Nedelya & Atanas	Quickstep	36 (9, 9, 9, 9) + 5 = 41	1	30,5%	6	7	Safe
3.	Natali & Dimitar	Cha-cha-cha	40 (10, 10, 10, 10) + 5 = 45	6	17,9%	4	10	Safe
4.	Ivet & Todor	Quickstep	38 (9, 10, 9, 10) + 5 = 43	3	13,1%	3	6	Bottom three
5.	Dara & Jimmy	Jive, hip-hop	40 (10, 10, 10, 10) + 5 = 45	6	19,2%	5	11	Safe
6.	Valeri & Dorina	Argentine tango	39 (10, 10, 9, 10) + 5 = 44	4	7,8%	1	5	Bottom three
Judges' challenge
1.	Nedelya & Atanas; Ivet & Todor; Dara & Jimmy	Choreography of the song "Last Dance"	Judges scores: 40 (10, 10, 10, 10): 5 points					
2.	Valeri & Dorina; Papi Hans & Ani; Natali & Dimitar	Choreography of the song "Last Dance"	Judges scores: 40 (10, 10, 10, 10): 5 points					
Elimination duel
1.	Papi Hans & Ani	Argentine tango	Public vote: 32,6%					Eliminated
2.	Ivet & Todor	Bulgarian folk dance, paso doble	Public vote: 35,1%					Safe
3.	Valeri & Dorina	Jazz	Public vote: 32,3%					Eliminated

=== Week 13: Final (May 14) ===
Draw	Couple	Dance	Judges scores	Result
1.	Nedelya & Atanas	Argentine tango	39 (10, 10, 9, 10)	
2.	Ivet & Todor	Showdance	38 (10, 9, 9, 10)	
3.	Natali & Dimitar	Freestyle	40 (10, 10, 10, 10)	
4.	Dara & Jimmy	Showdance	40 (10, 10, 10, 10)	
Second dance
1.	Nedelya & Atanas	Freestyle	39 (9, 10, 10, 10)	Safe
2.	Natali & Dimitar	Freestyle	39 (10, 10, 10, 9)	Safe
3.	Ivet & Todor	Freestyle	40 (10, 10, 10, 10)	Fourth place
4.	Dara & Jimmy	Showdance	40 (10, 10, 10, 10)	Safe
Last dance
1.	Nedelya & Atanas	Rumba	Public vote: 43,34%	Winners
2.	Natali & Dimitar	Samba	Public vote: 16,71%	Third place
3.	Dara & Jimmy	Paso doble	Public vote: 39,95%	Runners-up
