= Dancing Stars season 2 =

Dancing Stars
- Season 2
- Presented by: Elena Petrova; Dimiter Pavlov
- Judges: Maria Gigova; Ilyana Raeva; Pambous Agapiu; Vera Marinova
- No. of episodes: 22

Release
- Original network: bTV
- Original release: September 27 – December 12, 2009

Dancing Stars returned for a second season on September 27, 2009. The show was based on the BBC Worldwide format Dancing With The Stars. It was produced by Slavi Trifonov and was aired on Sundays at 8:00 pm on bTV. It competes with Nova Television's VIP Dance. Started on 10 October, Dancing Stars 2 was aired on Saturdays as well.

The show's new hosts were the actress Elena Petrova and the TV and radio presenter Dimitar Pavlov.

== Couples ==
Celebrity	Occupation	Professional partner	Status
Grafa	Singer	Yulia Andonova	Eliminated
Aksinia	Singer & reality TV star	Stoyan Stoyanov	Participating
Kroum Savov	Sport journalist & TV host	Maria Agapyu	Participating
Etien Levi	Music teacher	Iva Grigorova	Participating
Miodrag Ivanov	Showman	Pavlina Vulcheva	Disqualified
Todor Kirkov	Sport journalist & TV presenter	Petya Dimitrova	Participating
Krasi Radkov	Actor	Elena Ilieva	Participating
Stanislava Gancheva	TV Host	Georgi Mihov	Participating
Bianka Panova	World gymnastics champion	Svetoslav Vasilev	Participating
Madlen Algafari	Psychologist	Alexander Vachev	Participating
Veneta Harizanova	Fashion model	Iliyan Chakurov	Participating
Kristina Dimitrova	Singer	Nikolay Manolov	Participating

== See also ==
- Dancing With The Stars
