= Kato dve kapki voda =

- Като две капки вода
- Genre: Reality television
- Presented by: Dimitar Rachkov; Vasil Vasilev – Zueka; Gerasim Georgiev – Gero
- Judges: Magarditch Halvadjian; Hilda Kazasyan; Lyuben Dilov Jr.; Militsa Gladnishka; Julian Konstantinov; Dimitar Kovatchev – Funky; Dobrin Vekilov – Doni; Viktor Kalev; Yordanka Hristova; Julian Vergov; Assen Blatechki; Veselin Marinov; Lubo Kirov; Azis
- Country of origin: Bulgaria
- Original language: Bulgarian
- No. of seasons: 14
- No. of episodes: 176

Production
- Production location: Global Films
- Running time: 180–210 minutes
- Production company: Endemol

Original release
- Network: NOVA
- Release: 13 March 2013 – present

„Kato dve kapki voda“ is a Bulgarian reality show based on Tu cara me suena/Your Face Sounds Familiar, developed by Endemol and Antena 3. The show started on March 13, 2013 on NOVA with Magarditch Halvadjian's company Global Films acting as producers. The show continues to air each Spring.

The show features famous people (actors, singers, TV presenters and other showbiz personalities) who, within 3 months, imitate world-famous and domestic performers from the music scene. For the imitation, they must behave like them in appearance (from the video or concert performance), behavior, voice and pursue a resemblance "like two drops of water". For the transformation of the performer, the participants must undergo all kinds of changes. In most Bulgarian seasons of the show, 8 people participate, but in some there are more.

== Series summary ==
Season	TV channel	Year	Episodes	Start	Final	Contestants	Winner
1	NOVA	2013	12	March 13	June 5	8	Raffi Boghosyan
2	NOVA	2014	13	March 10	June 9	8	Nevena Bozukova – Neve
3	NOVA	2015	12	March 3	May 25	8	Nencho Balabanov
4	NOVA	2016	12	March 3	May 30	8	Kalin Vrachanski
5	NOVA	2017	13	February 27	May 29	8	Mihaela Marinova
6	NOVA	2018	13	February 26	May 28	8	Slavin Slavchev
7	NOVA	2019	13	February 25	May 27	8	Stefan Ilchev
8	NOVA	2020	13	February 24	May 18	9	Fiki
9	NOVA	2021	13	February 22	May 24	8	Raffi Boghosyan
10	NOVA	2022	13	February 14	May 16	10	Krasimir Radkov
11	NOVA	2023	12	February 19	May 21	9	Vladimir Mihaylov
12	NOVA	2024	12	February 19	May 13	8	Vladimir Zombori
13	NOVA	2025	12	February 23	May 18	9	Veniamin
14	NOVA	2026	12	February 16	May 18	9	Daniel Peev – Dundi

== Cast ==
=== Hosts and judges ===
Host	Judge	Contestant	Mentor	Guest host	Guest judge

Cast member	Season													
Cast member	1	2	3	4	5	6	7	8	9	10	11	12	13	14
Hosts
Dimitar Rachkov														
Vasil Vasilev - Zueka														
Gerasim Georgiev - Gero														
Judges
Magarditch Halvadjian														
Hilda Kazasyan														
Lyuben Dilov Jr.														
Julian Konstantinov														
Militsa Gladnishka														
Dimitar Kovatchev - Funky														
Dobrin Vekilov – Doni														
Yordanka Hristova														
Viktor Kalev														
Julian Vergov														
Veselin Marinov														
Assen Blatechki														
Lubo Kirov														
Azis														

==== Line-up of judges ====
Series	Year	Judges			
1	2013	Lyuben Dilov Jr.	Hilda Kazasyan	Magarditch Halvadjian	
2	2014	Julian Konstantinov	Militsa Gladnishka	Hilda Kazasyan	Magarditch Halvadjian
3	2015	GUEST	Dimitar Kovatchev – Funky	Hilda Kazasyan	Magarditch Halvadjian
4	2016	Dimitar Kovatchev – Funky	Hilda Kazasyan	Dobrin Vekilov – Doni	
5	2017	Dimitar Kovatchev – Funky	Yordanka Hristova	Viktor Kalev	
6	2018	Dimitar Kovatchev – Funky	Hilda Kazasyan	GUEST	
7	2019	Dimitar Kovatchev – Funky	Hilda Kazasyan	GUEST	
8	2020	Dimitar Kovatchev – Funky	Hilda Kazasyan	Julian Vergov	
9	2021	Dimitar Kovatchev – Funky	Hilda Kazasyan	Julian Vergov	
10	2022	Dimitar Kovatchev – Funky	Hilda Kazasyan	Julian Vergov	GUEST
11	2023	Veselin Marinov	Dimitar Kovatchev – Funky	Hilda Kazasyan	Assen Blatechki
12	2024	Veselin Marinov	Dimitar Kovatchev – Funky	Hilda Kazasyan	Lubo Kirov
13	2025	Veselin Marinov	Dimitar Kovatchev – Funky	Hilda Kazasyan	Lubo Kirov
14	2026	Veselin Marinov	Dimitar Kovatchev – Funky	Hilda Kazasyan	Azis

=== Mentors ===
Vocal mentor	Choreography mentor	Acting mentor	Contestant	Judge

Mentor	Season													
Mentor	1	2	3	4	5	6	7	8	9	10	11	12	13	14
Etien Levi														
Mihaela Marinova														
Aleksandra Eneva														
Georgi Nizamov														
Militsa Gladnishka														
Stanimir Gamov														
Nencho Balabanov														
Vladimir Mihaylov														

== Contestants ==
=== Season 1 (2013) ===
№	Contestant	Notability	Result
1	Raffi Boghosyan	Pop singer, X Factor 1 winner	Winner (91 points)
2	Militsa Gladnishka	Actress, jazz singer	Runner-up (89 points)
3	Stanimir Gamov	Actor	Third place (74 points)
4	Albena Mihova	Actress	Fourth place (76 points)
5	Stefan Ryadkov	Actor	Non-qualifier (69 points)
6	Maria Ignatova	Actress, TV host	Non-qualifier (67 points)
7	Aleksey Kozhuharov	Actor	Non-qualifier (55 points)
8	Diana Lyubenova	Actress, TV host	Non-qualifier (51 points)

=== Season 2 (2014) ===
№	Contestant	Notability	Result
1	Nevena Bozukova – Neve	Actress	Winner (83 points)
2	Katsi Vaptsarov	TV host	Runner-up (87 points)
3	Stefania Koleva	Actress	Third place (79 points)
4	Antoaneta Dobreva – Neti	Pop singer, actress	Fourth place (101 points)
5	Ivo Tanev	TV host, opera and pop-folk singer	Non-qualifier (76 points)
6	Maya Bezhanska	Actress	Non-qualifier (68 points)
7	Pavel Vladimirov	TV host	Non-qualifier (68 points)
8	Deyan Donkov	Actor	Non-qualifier (62 points)

=== Season 3 (2015) ===
№	Contestant	Notability	Result
1	Nencho Balabanov	Actor, pop singer	Winner (96 points)
2	Filip Avramov	Actor	Runner-up (84 points)
3	Azis	Pop-folk singer	Third place (90 points)
4	Krisko	Rapper	Fourth place (80 points)
5	Zhana Bergendorff	Pop singer, X Factor 2 winner	Non-qualifier (72 points)
6	Milena Markova – Matsa	Actress	Non-qualifier (61 points)
7	Nona Yotova	Actress, former politician, pop singer	Non-qualifier (45 points)
8	Delyana Marinova – Djudji	TV host	Non-qualifier (44 points)

=== Season 4 (2016) ===
№	Contestant	Notability	Result
1	Kalin Vrachanski	Actor	Winner (88 points)
2	Poli Genova	Pop singer	Runner-up (87 points)
3	Gerasim Georgiev – Gero	TV host, actor	Third place (84 points)
4	Orlin Pavlov	Pop singer, actor	Fourth place (76 points)
5	Preslava	Pop-folk singer	Non-qualifier (70 points)
6	Georgi Nizamov & Svetozar Hristov	Actor & Pop singer	Non-qualifiers (63 points)
7	Julia Bocheva	Actress, pop singer	Non-qualifier (52 points)
8	Preyah	Pop singer	Non-qualifier (52 points)

=== Season 5 (2017) ===
№	Contestant	Notability	Result
1	Mihaela Marinova	Pop singer	Winner (92 points)
2	Desi Slava	Pop-folk singer	Runner-up (88 points)
3	Lucy Diakovska	Pop singer	Third place (91 points)
4	Miro	Pop singer	Fourth place (83 points)
5	Vanja Džaferović	Reality star, former football player	Non-qualifier (81 points)
6	Sofia Dzhamdzhieva	Actress	Non-qualifier (71 points)
7	Bashar Rahal	Actor, TV host	Non-qualifier (63 points)
8	Kostadin Georgiev – Kotseto Kalki	Musician, actor	Non-qualifier (55 points)

=== Season 6 (2018) ===
№	Contestant	Notability	Result
1	Slavin Slavchev	Pop rock singer, X Factor 3 winner	Winner (85 points)
2	Ivan Yurukov	Actor	Runner-up (82 points)
3	Konstantin	Pop-folk singer	Third place (97 points)
4	Gery-Nikol	R&B, pop and pop-folk singer	Fourth place (79 points)
5	Sofi Marinova	Pop-folk singer	Non-qualifier (76 points)
6	Borislav Zahariev – Bobi Turboto	Actor	Non-qualifier (71 points)
7	Zlatka Raykova	Model, Miss Playmate 2007	Non-qualifier (67 points)
8	Margarita Hranova	Pop singer	Non-qualifier (67 points)

=== Season 7 (2019) ===
№	Contestant	Notability	Result
1	Stefan Ilchev	Pop singer	Winner (97 points)
2	Maria Ilieva	Pop singer	Runner-up (83 points)
3	Milko Kalaidjiev	Pop-folk singer	Third place (79 points)
4	Tita	Pop and pop-folk singer	Fourth place (86 points)
5	Desi Dobreva	Pop and folklore singer	Non-qualifier (77 points)
6	Papi Hans	Pop singer, writer	Non-qualifier (72 points)
7	Dicho Hristov	Pop rock singer	Non-qualifier (66 points)
8	Petya Buyuklieva	Pop rock singer	Non-qualifier (64 points)

=== Season 8 (2020) ===
№	Contestant	Notability	Result
1	Fiki	Pop-folk singer	Winner (111 points)
2	Magi Dzhanavarova	Pop singer	Runner-up (85 points)
3	Dara	Pop singer	Third place (108 points)
4	Georgi Simeonov – JJ	Pop singer	Fourth place (88 points)
5	Dimitar Marinov	Actor	Non-qualifier (100 points)
6	Antoan Petrov – Andi	Actor	Non-qualifier (80 points)
7	Toto	Rapper, R&B singer	Non-qualifier (77 points)
8	Galya Kurdova	Pop singer	Non-qualifier (65 points)
9	Luna	Pop-folk singer	Non-qualifier (42 points)

Despite that Dimitar Marinov qualified for the final, he gave up his place to Magi Dzhanavarova.

=== Season 9: All Stars (2021) ===
№	Contestant	Notability	Result
1	Raffi Boghosyan; Season 1	Pop singer, X Factor 1 winner	Winner (545 points)
2	Fiki; Season 8	Pop-folk singer	Runner-up (592 points)
3	Mihaela Marinova; Season 5	Pop singer	Third place (578 points)
4	Militsa Gladnishka; Season 1	Actress, jazz singer	Fourth place (444 points)
5	Poli Genova; Season 4	Pop singer	Non-qualifier (425 points)
6	Sofi Marinova; Season 6	Pop-folk singer	Non-qualifier (416 points)
7	Azis; Season 3	Pop-folk singer	Non-qualifier (397 points)
8	Katsi Vaptsarov; Season 2	TV host	Non-qualifier (375 points)

=== Season 10 (2022) ===
№	Contestant	Notability	Result
1	Krasimir Radkov	Actor	Winner (672 points)
2	Aleksandar Sano	Actor, hip-hop singer	Runner-up (708 points)
3	Krisia Todorova	Pop singer	Third place (621 points)
4	Darin Angelov	Actor	Fourth place (652 points)
5	Esil Duran	Pop-folk and jazz singer	Non-qualifier (607 points)
6	Ruslan Maynov	Actor, pop-folk and pop singer	Non-qualifier (593 points)
7	Anelia	Pop-folk singer	Non-qualifier (546 points)
8	Alisia	Pop-folk singer	Non-qualifier (542 points)
9	Monyu Monev	Actor	Non-qualifier (521 points)
10	Mariana Popova	Pop singer	Non-qualifier (508 points)

=== Season 11 (2023) ===
№	Contestant	Notability	Result
1	Vladimir Mihaylov	Actor, musician	Winner (764 points)
2	Kerana	Pop rock singer	Runner-up (576 points)
3	Toma Zdravkov	Rock singer	Third place (650 points)
4	Dara Ekimova	Pop singer	Fourth place (561 points)
5	Dimo Aleksiev & Ralitsa Paskaleva	Actors	Non-qualifier (548 points)
6	Hristo Petkov	Actor	Non-qualifier (493 points)
7	Kali	Pop-folk singer	Non-qualifier (466 points)
8	Hristo Garbov	Actor	Non-qualifier (377 points)
9	Yana Marinova	Actress	Non-qualifier (329 points)

=== Season 12 (2024) ===
№	Contestant	Notability	Result
1	Vladimir Zombori	Actor	Winner (684 points)
2	Christiana Loizu	Pop and opera singer, X Factor 4 winner	Runner-up (499 points)
3	Atanas Penev	Rock singer	Third place (552 points)
4	Ivo Arakov	Actor, pop singer	Fourth place (483 points)
5	Elena Atanasova	Actress	Finalist (483 points)
6	Panayot Panayotov	Pop singer	Finalist (451 points)
7	Maria	Pop-folk singer	Finalist (447 points)
8	Dzhuliana Gani	Model, influencer	Finalist (383 points)

=== Season 13 (2025) ===
№	Contestant	Notability	Result
1	Veniamin	Pop singer	Winner (611 points)
2	Mihaela Fileva	Pop singer	Runner-up (657 points)
3	Ivan Hristov	TV host, producer	Third place (572 points)
4	Nikolaos Tsitiridis	Comedian, TV host	Finalist (545 points)
5	Aleksandra Lashkova	Actress	Finalist (526 points)
6	Dimitar Atanasov & Hristo Mladenov	Pop duet	Finalist (517 points)
7	Roksana	Pop-folk singer	Finalist (517 points)
8	Zvezdi Keremidchiev	Rock singer	Finalist (482 points)
9	Divna	Pop singer	Finalist (470 points)

=== Season 14 (2026) ===
№	Contestant	Notability	Result
1	Daniel Peev – Dundi	Actor	Winner (560 points)
2	Emilia	Pop-folk singer	Runner-up (613 points)
3	Ivo Dimchev	Pop singer, actor	Third place (568 points)
4	Aleksandra Raeva	Actress, TV host, pop singer	Finalist (602 points)
5	Boris Hristov	Pop and rock singer	Finalist (550 points)
6	Simona	Pop-folk singer	Finalist (497 points)
7	Viktor Todorov	Pop singer	Finalist (493 points)
8	Plamena Petrova	Pop and pop-folk singer	Finalist (439 points)
9	Vesela Babinova	Actress	Finalist (431 points)
