= Star Academy (Bulgarian TV series) =

- Genre: Interactive talent show Reality
- Presented by: Maria Ilieva
- Opening theme: "Fame" by Irene Cara
- Ending theme: "Fame" by Irene Cara
- Country of origin: Bulgaria
- Original language: Bulgarian
- No. of seasons: 1
- No. of episodes: 99

Production
- Executive producers: Global Films, Endemol
- Production locations: Sofia, Bulgaria

Original release
- Network: Nova Television
- Release: April 11 – July 18, 2005

Star Academy is a Bulgarian reality television show produced by the Dutch company Endemol, based on the Spanish format called Operación Triunfo. It consisted of a contest of young singers. It was broadcast on Nova Television. After the end of the season, the contestants went on tour around Bulgaria. A second season of the show was announced to start in 2007, but it was never released.

The reality show was hosted by Maria Ilieva and featured guest stars such as Sonique, Filip Kirkorov.

Star Academy Bulgaria started on April 11, 2005 on Nova Television and ended on July 18, 2005. It was produced by Global Films. The show was filmed in the former then Big Brother House. It was redecorated as an academy. The Housemates from Big Brother 2, VIP Brother 1, BB3 and VIPB2 lived there, too.

The winner of the 2005 season was Marin Yonchev (17 years old). He won 150,000 leva (about 75,000 euro).

In the 2005 season, the Students were originally 14. Later, 2 new Students entered the Academy. Here are all the participants from the 2005 season of Star Academy:

- Marin Yonchev (17) – Winner on Day 99
- Ivaylo Kolev (26) – Runner-up on Day 99
- Viktoria Arsova (22) – 3rd place on Day 99
- Vyara Pantaleeva (22) – 4th place on Day 99
- Georgi Kostov (20) – 12th evicted on Day 93
- Deyan Kamenov (21) – 11th evicted on Day 86
- Valentina Aleksandrova (19) – 10th evicted on Day 78 (She entered on Day 37)
- Daniel Georgiev (21) – 9th evicted on Day 71
- Vesela Valkova (25) – 8th evicted on Day 64 (She entered on Day 44)
- Aleksandra Ovcharova (19) – 7th evicted on Day 57
- Mariela Petrova (19) – 6th evicted on Day 50
- Dian Panov (also known as "The Joker") (18) – 5th evicted on Day 43
- Lyudmila Manolova (20) – 4th evicted on Day 36
- Klavdiya Draganova (17) – 3rd evicted on Day 29
- Nataliya Taneva (22) – 2nd evicted on Day 22
- Aksinia Chenkova (18) – 1st evicted on Day 15

Here are all the teachers from the 2005 season of Star Academy Bulgaria:

- Dimitar Stanchev – The director of the Academy
- Alfredo Tores – The choreographer
- Danko Yordanov – Music Teacher №1
- Rosi Ovcharova – Music Teacher №2
- Alis Nubar Bovarian – Music Teacher №3
- Veselin Rankov – Stage manners Teacher
- Laura Josh-Markov – English Teacher
- Anastasia Sharenkova – Choreographer

== Star Academy Bulgaria Facts ==
- General
  - Winner: 1 male
  - Highest eviction percentage: Vesela Valkova, 91.2%
  - Least eviction difference: Valentina Aleksandrova 51%, Deyan Kamenov 49%, Valentina evicted; Daniel Georgiev 51%, Deyan Kamenov 49%, Daniel evicted
  - Older Star Academy student: Ivaylo Kolev – 26 years old
  - Younger Star Academy student: Klavdiya Draganova and Marin Yonchev – 17 years old
  - Shortest stay in the Academy: Aksinia Chenkova, 15 days
  - Longest stay in the Academy: Marin Yonchev, 99 days
  - Most saving student: Georgi Kostov, 5
  - Same-Sized (Tall/Short) students: Aksinia Chenkova, Klavdiya Draganova, Dian Panov and Marin Yonchev
- 2005 /Star Academy 1/
  - First student to be evicted: Aksinia Chenkova
  - First replacement student: Valentina Aleksandrova
  - First Star Academy Winner: Marin Yonchev /150 000 levas/
  - First student not to be nominated during the whole season: Viktoria Arsova
  - First finalists: Marin Yonchev, Ivaylo Kolev, Viktoria Arsova and Vyara Pantaleeva
  - First nominations without a saved student: Georgi Kostov, Deyan Kamenov and Aleksandra Ovcharova
  - First student to be evicted by the students: Deyan Kamenov
  - First students nominated by the viewers: Georgi Kostov, Deyan Kamenov and Marin Yonchev
  - First student to be saved from the teachers: Marin Yonchev
  - First students to be nominated by the director of the Academy: Ivailo Kolev and Vyara Pantaleeva
  - First replacement teacher: Alis Nubar Bovarian
