= Dancing Stars (Bulgarian TV series) season 4 =

Dancing Stars
- Season 4
- Hosted by: Aleksandra Sarchadjieva; Kalin Sarmenov; Magi Zhelyazkova
- Judges: Hristo Mutafchiev; Galena Velikova; Iliana Raeva; Alfredo Torres
- Celebrity winner: Albena Denkova
- Professional winner: Kaloyan Ivanov
- No. of episodes: 24

Release
- Original network: NOVA
- Original release: March 11 – June 5, 2014

Season chronology
- Next → Season 5

The fourth season of Bulgarian dancing reality competition Dancing Stars premiered on March 11, 2014, on NOVA. The show was hosted by Aleksandra Sarchadjieva, Kalin Sarmenov and Magi Zhelyazkova. The judges were Hristo Mutafchiev, Galena Velikova, Iliana Raeva and Alfredo Torres. The show aired each Tuesday and Thursday from 20:00 to 23:00. From the sixth week the Thursday episodes were aired between 20:00 and 22:00.

Albena Denkova was crowned as the winner alongside her professional partner Kaloyan Ivanov on June 5, 2014.

== Cast ==
The new season was announced on January 8, 2014. A month later, it was announced that Galena Velikova, Iliana Raeva and Alfredo Torres are returning to the judging panel from the previous season. On February 12, it was announced that they would be joined by a new judge - actor Hristo Mutafchiev.

On February 16 it was announced that the main hosts would be previous season host Aleksandra Sarchadjieva and previous season judge Kalin Sarmenov. On March 10 it was revealed that Magi Zhelyazkova would be the show's co-host who would talk to the nominated couples' defenders.

The first contestant to be revealed was snowboarder Aleksandra Zhekova on February 17. On February 21, actor and TV host Encho Danailov and actress Albena Mihova were announced as the next celebrities. The next participants to be announced were pop singer Mihaela Fileva and rap singer Venzy on February 24 and pop-folk singer Milko Kalaidjiev on February 27. The next batches of contestants to be revealed were culinary expert and TV host Uti Bachvarov, TV host Nana Gladwish and TV host and former rhythmic gymnast Neli Atanasova on March 5 and actor and martial arts master Anton Kasabov, actor Darin Angelov and model and actor Marian Kyurpanov in the next day. The day before the premiere were announced the last two celebrities - sport journalist and fashion designer Mika Stoichkova and Big Brother 2 participant Elena Georgieva. On March 14 it was announced that figure skater Albena Denkova would join the cast.

The professional partners included returning dancers Ani Doncheva, Atanas Mesechkov, Elena Dobrikova, Petya Dimitrova, Svetlin Dimitrov, Dorina Stoyanova, Kaloyan Ivanov, Petyo Stefanov and Ralitsa Merdzhanova and debuters Dean Stefanov, Elena Merdzhanova, Mihaela Pavlova, Miroslav Milev, Simeon Timov and Todor Atanasov.

== Contestants ==
№	Celebrity	Notability	Professional partner	Result
1	Albena Denkova	Figure skater	Kaloyan Ivanov	Winners on June 5, 2014
2	Mihaela Fileva	Pop singer	Svetlin Dimitrov	Runners-up on June 5, 2014
3	Darin Angelov	Actor	Ani Doncheva; Teodora Kaloyanova (Episode 11)	Eliminated 12th on June 3, 2014
4	Neli Atanasova; Simona Peycheva (Episode 15)	TV host & former rhythmic gymnast	Atanas Mesechkov	Eliminated 11th on May 29, 2014
5	Anton Kasabov	Actor & martial arts master	Dorina Stoyanova	Eliminated 10th on May 22, 2014
6	Elena Georgieva	Decorator & Big Brother 2 participant	Dean Stefanov	Eliminated 9th on May 15, 2014
7	Nana Gladwish	TV host	Miroslav Milev	Eliminated 8th on May 8, 2014
8	Aleksandra Zhekova	Snowboarder	Simeon Timov	Eliminated 7th on April 24, 2014
9	Venzy	Rap singer	Ralitsa Merdzhanova	Eliminated 6th on April 17, 2014
10	Albena Mihova	Actress	Petyo Stoyanov	Eliminated 5th on April 10, 2014
11	Uti Bachvarov	Culinary expert & TV host	Elena Dobrikova	Withdrew on April 8, 2014
12	Mika Stoichkova	Sport journalist & fashion designer	Todor Atanasov	Eliminated 4th on April 3, 2014
13	Marian Kyurpanov	Model & actor	Mihaela Pavlova	Eliminated 3rd on March 27, 2014
14	Milko Kalaidjiev	Pop-folk singer	Elena Merdzhanova	Eliminated 2nd on March 20, 2014
15	Encho Danailov	Actor & TV host	Petya Dimitrova	Eliminated 1st on March 13, 2014

== Scoring chart ==
The highest score each week is indicated in bold green with a dagger (†), while the lowest score each week is indicated in italicized red with a double-dagger (‡).

Color key:

Winners
Runners-up
Bottom three/four
Bottom two (Week 1-5)
Withdrew
Eliminated

Dancing Stars season 4 – Weekly scores
Couple	Pl.	Week												
Couple	Pl.	1	2	3	4	5	6	7	8	9	10	11	12	
Albena D. & Kaloyan	1st				**37**†	**40**†	30	37+38=**75**†	40+4=44	39‡	40+40=80	40+38=**78**†	40+40=**80**†	—
Mihaela & Svetlyo	2nd	30	**35**†	**40**†	32	31	**38**†	37+33=70	39+7=**46**†	40	40+40+2=**82**†	35+37=72	40+40=**80**†	—
Darin & Ani	3rd	**32**†	25	36	**37**†	38	29	38+33=71	38+5=43	40+10=**50**†	35+38+2=75	38+37=75	40+40=**80**†	
Neli & Nasko	4th	29	28	37	28	31	35	37+38=**75**†	39+1=40	40+10=**50**†	32+35=67‡	37+33=70‡		
Anton & Dorina	5th	27	28	33	30	30	27	34+33=67	28+3=31‡	39‡	32+38=70			
Elena & Dean	6th	31	28	30			20‡	32+38=70	34+6=40	30+10=40				
Nana & Miroslav	7th	26	32	27‡	31	26‡	29	30+38=68	33+2=35					
Sani & Simeon	8th		33	27‡	25	32	35	33+33=66‡						
Venzy & Ralitsa	9th	25	29	34	23‡	26‡	33							
Albena M. & Petyo	10th	29	30	32	23‡	28								
Uti & Elena	11th	21	33	34	31									
Mika & Todor	12th	26	23‡	30	29									
Marian & Mihaela	13th	25	26	30										
Milko & Elena	14th	19‡	23‡											
Encho & Petya	15th	22												

== Weekly scores ==
Individual judges scores in the chart below (given in parentheses) are listed in this order from left to right: Hristo Mutafchiev, Galena Velikova, Iliana Raeva, Alfredo Torres.

=== Week 1: Premiere (March 11–13) ===
During the eliminations episode guest performers were acrobatic rock and roll champions Aleksandar Iliev & Iva Zareva and singer Divna, who presented her new song "Moyta muzika". Celebrity dance guest was Season 3 finalist Elen Koleva who performed Tango with her partner Kaloyan Ivanov.

Episode	Draw	Couple	Dance	Judges scores	Result
Episode 1 (March 11)	1.	Uti & Elena	Cha-cha-cha	21 (5, 5, 6, 5)	Safe
Episode 1 (March 11)	2.	Mihaela & Svetlyo	Quickstep	30 (6, 8, 8, 8)	Safe
Episode 1 (March 11)	3.	Encho & Petya	Cha-cha-cha	22 (5, 6, 6, 5)	Bottom three
Episode 1 (March 11)	4.	Nana & Miroslav	Foxtrot	26 (6, 7, 7, 6)	Safe
Episode 1 (March 11)	5.	Mika & Todor	Cha-cha-cha	26 (6, 7, 7, 6)	Safe
Episode 1 (March 11)	6.	Marian & Mihaela	Foxtrot	25 (5, 6, 7, 7)	Bottom three
Episode 1 (March 11)	7.	Albena M. & Petyo	Cha-cha-cha	29 (6, 8, 7, 8)	Safe
Episode 1 (March 11)	8.	Milko & Elena	Foxtrot	19 (4, 5, 5, 5)	Safe
Episode 1 (March 11)	9.	Elena & Dean	Cha-cha-cha	31 (7, 7, 8, 9)	Safe
Episode 1 (March 11)	10.	Darin & Ani	Quickstep	32 (7, 8, 9, 8)	Safe
Episode 1 (March 11)	11.	Venzy & Ralitsa	Cha-cha-cha	25 (6, 6, 6, 7)	Safe
Episode 1 (March 11)	12.	Neli & Nasko	Foxtrot	29 (7, 7, 7, 8)	Bottom three
Episode 1 (March 11)	13.	Anton & Dorina	Cha-cha-cha	27 (6, 6, 8, 7)	Safe
Episode 2 (March 13)	Elimination				
Episode 2 (March 13)	1.	Marian & Mihaela	Foxtrot	Public vote	Safe
Episode 2 (March 13)	2.	Encho & Petya	Cha-cha-cha	Public vote	Bottom two
Episode 2 (March 13)	3.	Neli & Nasko	Foxtrot	Public vote	Bottom two
Episode 2 (March 13)	Elimination duel				
Episode 2 (March 13)	1.	Neli & Nasko	Freestyle	Public vote	Safe
Episode 2 (March 13)	2.	Encho & Petya	Charleston	Public vote	Eliminated

=== Week 2: Latino Week (March 18–20) ===
Aleksandra "Sani" Zhekova and her professional partner entered the competition this week.

During the eliminations episode guest performers were contortionist Emi Vauthey & breakdancer Baptiste Montassier from Cirque Éloize, Poli Genova and Dicho, who sang "neka s teb" with Bon-Bon and Deo, Leo, Raffi and Igrata who sang "4D".

Episode	Draw	Couple	Dance	Judges scores	Result
Episode 3 (March 18)	1.	Darin & Ani	Jive	25 (6, 7, 6, 6)	Safe
Episode 3 (March 18)	2.	Mika & Todor	Jive	23 (7, 5, 6, 5)	Safe
Episode 3 (March 18)	3.	Neli & Nasko	Jive	28 (7, 7, 7, 7)	Safe
Episode 3 (March 18)	4.	Nana & Miroslav	Jive	32 (8, 8, 8, 8)	Safe
Episode 3 (March 18)	5.	Elena & Dean	Samba	28 (7, 7, 7, 7)	Bottom three
Episode 3 (March 18)	6.	Venzy & Ralitsa	Samba	29 (7, 7, 7, 8)	Safe
Episode 3 (March 18)	7.	Albena M. & Petyo	Jive	30 (7, 7, 8, 8)	Safe
Episode 3 (March 18)	8.	Marian & Mihaela	Samba	26 (7, 6, 7, 6)	Bottom three
Episode 3 (March 18)	9.	Milko & Elena	Samba	23 (6, 5, 6, 6)	Bottom three
Episode 3 (March 18)	10.	Anton & Dorina	Jive	28 (7, 7, 7, 7)	Safe
Episode 3 (March 18)	11.	Uti & Elena	Samba	33 (8, 8, 10, 7)	Safe
Episode 3 (March 18)	12.	Mihaela & Svetlyo	Samba	35 (8, 9, 9, 9)	Safe
Episode 3 (March 18)	13.	Sani & Simeon	Jive	33 (9, 8, 9, 7)	Safe
Episode 4 (March 20)	Elimination				
Episode 4 (March 20)	1.	Milko & Elena	Samba	Public vote	Bottom two
Episode 4 (March 20)	2.	Elena & Dean	Samba	Public vote	Safe
Episode 4 (March 20)	3.	Marian & Mihaela	Samba	Public vote	Bottom two
Episode 4 (March 20)	Elimination duel				
Episode 4 (March 20)	1.	Marian & Mihaela	Lindy hop	Public vote	Safe
Episode 4 (March 20)	2.	Milko & Elena	Disco	Public vote	Eliminated

=== Week 3: Love Week (March 25–27) ===
Due to a fracture, Elena Georgieva was unable to continue participating in the show and had to withdraw.

During the eliminations show Mihaela Fileva and NickName performed their song "Ima li nachin?" accompanied by dance group The Center, D2 premiered their song "Feniks" and celebrity dance guest Lyubomir Milchev-Dandy & Petya Dimitrova performed Paso doble.

Episode	Draw	Couple	Dance	Judges scores	Result
Episode 5 (March 25)	1.	Venzy & Ralitsa	Waltz	34 (8, 9, 9, 8)	Bottom three
Episode 5 (March 25)	2.	Marian & Mihaela	Waltz	30 (8, 7, 7, 8)	Bottom three
Episode 5 (March 25)	3.	Nana & Miroslav	Cha-cha-cha	27 (8, 6, 6, 7)	Safe
Episode 5 (March 25)	4.	Anton & Dorina	Waltz	33 (8, 8, 9, 8)	Safe
Episode 5 (March 25)	5.	Mika & Todor	Waltz	30 (8, 7, 7, 8)	Safe
Episode 5 (March 25)	6.	Uti & Elena	Argentine tango	34 (9, 8, 8, 9)	Safe
Episode 5 (March 25)	7.	Mihaela & Svetlyo	Argentine tango	40 (10, 10, 10, 10)	Safe
Episode 5 (March 25)	8.	Elena & Dean	Rumba	30 (9, 7, 7, 7)	Withdrew
Episode 5 (March 25)	9.	Sani & Simeon	Cha-cha-cha	27 (9, 5, 7, 6)	Safe
Episode 5 (March 25)	10.	Neli & Nasko	Rumba	37 (9, 9, 10, 9)	Safe
Episode 5 (March 25)	11.	Albena M. & Petyo	Argentine tango	32 (9, 8, 8, 7)	Bottom three
Episode 5 (March 25)	12.	Darin & Ani	Cha-cha-cha	36 (10, 8, 10, 8)	Safe
Episode 6 (March 27)	Elimination				
Episode 6 (March 27)	1.	Marian & Mihaela	Waltz	Public vote	Bottom two
Episode 6 (March 27)	2.	Albena M. & Petyo	Argentine tango	Public vote	Bottom two
Episode 6 (March 27)	3.	Venzy & Ralitsa	Waltz	Public vote	Safe
Episode 6 (March 27)	Elimination duel				
Episode 6 (March 27)	1.	Albena M. & Petyo	Charleston	Public vote: 61%	Safe
Episode 6 (March 27)	2.	Marian & Mihaela	Jive	Public vote: 39%	Eliminated

=== Week 4: Laugh Week (April 1–3) ===
Albena Denkova and Kaloyan Ivanov debuted this week on the show.

During the eliminations episode Akaga sang their song "Rockabilly zvezda", Teabo performed their song "Maria", Andrea Burr showed-off her hip-hop choreography and Vasilena Shopova & Viktor Alekov performed an Indian dance.

Episode	Draw	Couple	Dance	Judges scores	Result
Episode 7 (April 1)	1.	Albena M. & Petyo	Quickstep	23 (6, 4, 6, 7)	Bottom three
Episode 7 (April 1)	2.	Sani & Simeon	Jazz	25 (6, 6, 6, 7)	Safe
Episode 7 (April 1)	3.	Venzy & Ralitsa	Jive	23 (5, 4, 6, 8)	Safe
Episode 7 (April 1)	4.	Anton & Dorina	Quickstep	30 (6, 8, 8, 8)	Safe
Episode 7 (April 1)	5.	Mika & Todor	Salsa	29 (6, 7, 8, 8)	Bottom three
Episode 7 (April 1)	6.	Albena D. & Kaloyan	Quickstep	37 (9, 9, 10, 9)	Safe
Episode 7 (April 1)	7.	Uti & Elena	Paso doble	31 (10, 5, 8, 8)	Safe
Episode 7 (April 1)	8.	Neli & Nasko	Cha-cha-cha	28 (7, 7, 7, 7)	Bottom three
Episode 7 (April 1)	9.	Darin & Ani	Foxtrot	37 (10, 8, 10, 9)	Safe
Episode 7 (April 1)	10.	Mihaela & Svetlyo	Hip-hop	32 (9, 8, 8, 7)	Safe
Episode 7 (April 1)	11.	Nana & Miroslav	Quickstep	31 (8, 8, 7, 8)	Safe
Episode 8 (April 3)	Elimination				
Episode 8 (April 3)	1.	Mika & Todor	Salsa	Public vote	Bottom two
Episode 8 (April 3)	2.	Albena M. & Petyo	Quickstep	Public vote	Safe
Episode 8 (April 3)	3.	Neli & Nasko	Cha-cha-cha	Public vote	Bottom two
Episode 8 (April 3)	Elimination duel				
Episode 8 (April 3)	1.	Mika & Todor	Waltz	Public vote	Eliminated
Episode 8 (April 3)	2.	Neli & Nasko	Jazz	Public vote	Safe

=== Week 5: Movie Week (April 8–10) ===
Uti Bachvarov had to withdraw from the competition as he was in pre-infarction state during his rehearsal and he entered a hospital.

Elena Georgieva announced that she could return to the show as she recovered from her health issues. Over 80% of the public voted for her return and she was able to continue her participation from the next week.

During the eliminations show Stefan Valdobrev and Obichainite Zapodozreni presented their song "Snyag nad Sahara", Krisko performed his song "Ideal Petroff", Venzy and Divna premiered their song "Vupros na vreme", Forty Nguyen from Cirque Éloize performed breakdance and celebrity dance guest Sanya Borisova & Dean Stefanov performed Tango.

Episode	Draw	Couple	Dance	Judges scores	Result
Episode 9 (April 8)	1.	Nana & Miroslav	American smooth	26 (7, 7, 7, 5)	Safe
Episode 9 (April 8)	2.	Uti & Elena	—N/a	—N/a	Withdrew
Episode 9 (April 8)	3.	Sani & Simeon	Tango	32 (8, 8, 9, 7)	Safe
Episode 9 (April 8)	4.	Albena M. & Petyo	Quickstep	28 (7, 8, 7, 6)	Bottom three
Episode 9 (April 8)	5.	Anton & Dorina	Paso doble	30 (7, 8, 8, 7)	Safe
Episode 9 (April 8)	6.	Venzy & Ralitsa	Jive	26 (6, 7, 6, 7)	Safe
Episode 9 (April 8)	7.	Neli & Nasko	Contemporary	31 (8, 8, 7, 8)	Bottom three
Episode 9 (April 8)	8.	Mihaela & Svetlyo	Indian dance	31 (8, 9, 7, 7)	Safe
Episode 9 (April 8)	9.	Darin & Ani	Freestyle	38 (9, 10, 10, 9)	Bottom three
Episode 9 (April 8)	10.	Albena D. & Kaloyan	Foxtrot, swing	40 (10, 10, 10, 10)	Safe
Episode 10 (April 10)	Elimination				
Episode 10 (April 10)	1.	Albena M. & Petyo	Quickstep	Public vote	Bottom two
Episode 10 (April 10)	2.	Neli & Nasko	Contemporary	Public vote	Safe
Episode 10 (April 10)	3.	Darin & Ani	Freestyle	Public vote	Bottom two
Episode 10 (April 10)	Elimination duel				
Episode 10 (April 10)	1.	Albena M. & Petyo	Jive	Public vote: 21,8%	Eliminated
Episode 10 (April 10)	2.	Darin & Ani	Jazz	Public vote: 78,2%	Safe

=== Week 6: Salsa Week (April 15–17) ===
In the first episode of the week Darin's partner Ani was replaced by Teodora Kaloyanova due to the first feeling unwell.

In the eliminations episode Teodora Kaloyanova returned as a guest with Dimitar Kirkov, with the two performing Salsa.

Episode	Draw	Couple	Dance	Judges scores	Result
Episode 11 (April 15)	1.	Albena D. & Kaloyan	Salsa	30 (8, 7, 7, 8)	Safe
Episode 11 (April 15)	2.	Darin & Teodora	Salsa	29 (7, 8, 8, 6)	Safe
Episode 11 (April 15)	3.	Anton & Dorina	Salsa	27 (8, 7, 6, 6)	Bottom three
Episode 11 (April 15)	4.	Sani & Simeon	Salsa	35 (9, 9, 9, 8)	Safe
Episode 11 (April 15)	5.	Nana & Miroslav	Salsa	29 (7, 7, 7, 8)	Safe
Episode 11 (April 15)	6.	Neli & Nasko	Salsa	35 (9, 9, 8, 9)	Safe
Episode 11 (April 15)	7.	Elena & Dean	Salsa	20 (7, 6, 6, 1)	Bottom three
Episode 11 (April 15)	8.	Venzy & Ralitsa	Salsa	33 (8, 9, 8, 8)	Bottom three
Episode 11 (April 15)	9.	Mihaela & Svetlyo	Salsa	38 (10, 9, 10, 9)	Safe
Episde 12 (April 17)	Elimination				
Episde 12 (April 17)	1.	Anton & Dorina	Jive	Public vote	Safe
Episde 12 (April 17)	2.	Venzy & Ralitsa	Charleston	Public vote	Eliminated
Episde 12 (April 17)	3.	Elena & Dean	Showdance	Public vote	Safe

=== Week 7: Most Memorable Year Week (April 22–24) ===
During the eliminations episode guest performers included Violeta Yaneva & Salvatore Todaro who performed Waltz and Season 1 runner-up celebrity dance guest Violeta Markovska who performed with her partner Atanas Mesechkov Rumba.

Episode	Draw	Couple	Dance	Judges scores	Result
Episode 13 (April 22)	1.	Anton & Dorina	Foxtrot	34 (8, 9, 9, 8)	Safe
Episode 13 (April 22)	2.	Sani & Simeon	Quickstep	33 (9, 8, 9, 7)	Bottom three
Episode 13 (April 22)	3.	Nana & Miroslav	Argentine tango	30 (8, 7, 7, 8)	Safe
Episode 13 (April 22)	4.	Darin & Ani	Tango	38 (9, 9, 10, 10)	Bottom three
Episode 13 (April 22)	5.	Albena D. & Kaloyan	Rumba	37 (10, 8, 9, 10)	Safe
Episode 13 (April 22)	6.	Mihaela & Svetlyo	Swing	37 (10, 9, 9, 9)	Safe
Episode 13 (April 22)	7.	Neli & Nasko	Argentine tango	37 (9, 8, 10, 10)	Safe
Episode 13 (April 22)	8.	Elena & Dean	Waltz	32 (8, 8, 7, 9)	Bottom three
Episode 13 (April 22)	Judges' challenge				
Episode 13 (April 22)	1.	Team Paso doble: Mihaela & Svetlyo; Darin & Ani; Anton & Dorina; Sani & Simeon	Paso doble	33 (9, 8, 7, 9)	
Episode 13 (April 22)	2.	Team Tango: Neli & Nasko; Albena D. & Kaloyan; Elena & Dean; Nana & Miroslav	Tango	38 (10, 10, 8, 10)	
Episode 14 (April 24)	Elimination				
Episode 14 (April 24)	1.	Sani & Simeon	Jive	Public vote	Eliminated
Episode 14 (April 24)	2.	Darin & Ani	Salsa	Public vote	Safe
Episode 14 (April 24)	3.	Elena & Dean	Salsa	Public vote	Safe

=== Week 8: Concurents' Challenge Week (April 29-May 8) ===
In the first episode of the week Neli Atanasova was replaced by Simona Peycheva due to the first having back injury for two months and having to recover.

The show took a break for a week around Easter and returned a week later. At the eliminations episode guests performers were Lindy hop duo Dax Hock & Pamela Gaizutyte, popping animation dancer Marquese Scott and Maria Ilieva and Krisko who premiered their duet "Vidimo dovolni".

Episode	Draw	Couple	Dance	Judges scores	Result
Episode 15 (April 29)	1.	Nana & Miroslav	Mambo	33 (8, 8, 9, 8)	Bottom three
Episode 15 (April 29)	2.	Darin & Ani	Jitterbug	38 (9, 10, 10, 9)	Safe
Episode 15 (April 29)	3.	Anton & Dorina	Charleston	28 (8, 7, 7, 6)	Safe
Episode 15 (April 29)	4.	Mihaela & Svetlyo	Flamenco	39 (10, 9, 10, 10)	Safe
Episode 15 (April 29)	5.	Elena & Dean	Rock and roll	34 (9, 9, 8, 8)	Bottom three
Episode 15 (April 29)	6.	Simona & Nasko	Disco	39 (9, 10, 10, 10)	Bottom three
Episode 15 (April 29)	7.	Albena D. & Kaloyan	Bolero	40 (10, 10, 10, 10)	Safe
Episode 15 (April 29)	Dance marathon				
Episode 15 (April 29)	1.	Simona & Nasko	Cha-cha-cha	Bonus points: 1	
Episode 15 (April 29)	1.	Nana & Miroslav	Jive	Bonus points: 2	
Episode 15 (April 29)	1.	Anton & Dorina	Bulgarian folk dance	Bonus points: 3	
Episode 15 (April 29)	1.	Albena D. & Kaloyan	Foxtrot	Bonus points: 4	
Episode 15 (April 29)	1.	Darin & Ani	Foxtrot	Bonus points: 5	
Episode 15 (April 29)	1.	Elena & Dean	Freestyle	Bonus points: 6	
Episode 15 (April 29)	1.	Mihaela & Svetlyo	Freestyle	Bonus points: 7	
Episode 16 (May 8)	Elimination				
Episode 16 (May 8)	1.	Elena & Dean	African dance	Public vote: 35%	Safe
Episode 16 (May 8)	2.	Neli & Nasko	Argentine tango	Public vote: 35%	Safe
Episode 16 (May 8)	3.	Nana & Miroslav	Waltz	Public vote: 30%	Eliminated

=== Week 9 (May 13–15) ===
The special guests during the eliminations episode were Angel & Moisey, Dexter and Pavell & Venci Venc', who performed their song "Kude si brat?" and Vesi Boneva, who sang her song "Obseben si".

Episode	Draw	Couple	Dance	Judges scores	Result
Episode 17 (May 13)	1.	Mihaela & Svetlyo	Mambo	40 (10, 10, 10, 10)	Bottom four
Episode 17 (May 13)	2.	Neli & Nasko	Quickstep	40 (10, 10, 10, 10)	Safe
Episode 17 (May 13)	3.	Elena & Dean	Jive	30 (8, 8, 7, 7)	Bottom four
Episode 17 (May 13)	4.	Albena D. & Kaloyan	Jazz	39 (10, 9, 10, 10)	Bottom four
Episode 17 (May 13)	5.	Anton & Dorina	Tango	39 (10, 9, 10, 10)	Safe
Episode 17 (May 13)	6.	Darin & Ani	Paso doble	40 (10, 10, 10, 10)	Bottom four
Episode 17 (May 13)	Judges' challenge				
Episode 17 (May 13)	1.	Team Bom Bom: Mihaela & Svetlyo; Albena D. & Kaloyan; Anton & Dorina	Choreography of the song "Bom Bom"	39 (10, 9, 10, 10); Bonus points: 0	
Episode 17 (May 13)	2.	Team Foxy: Elena & Dean; Darin & Ani; Neli & Nasko; Nana & Miroslav	Choreography of the song "What Does the Fox Say"	40 (10, 10, 10, 10); Bonus points: 10	
Episode 18 (May 15)	Elimination				
Episode 18 (May 15)	1.	Darin & Ani	Tango	Public vote	Safe
Episode 18 (May 15)	2.	Albena D. & Kaloyan	Foxtrot, swing	Public vote	Safe
Episode 18 (May 15)	3.	Mihaela & Svetlyo	Contemporary	Public vote	Safe
Episode 18 (May 15)	4.	Elena & Dean	Cha-cha-cha	Public vote	Eliminated

=== Week 10: Prom Week (May 20–22) ===
Mihaela Fileva and Darin Angelov received bonus 2 points as a result of the public vote which appointed as Queen and King of the prom.

During the eliminations episode Zhana Bergendorff premiered her song "Samurai" and Deo, Leo, Igrata, Din-Yo and Marina premiered their song "Vseki mig".

Episode	Draw	Couple	Dance	Judges scores	Result
Episode 19 (May 20)	1.	Neli & Nasko	Cha-cha-cha	32 (8, 8, 8, 8)	
Episode 19 (May 20)	2.	Anton & Dorina	Foxtrot	32 (8, 8, 8, 8)	
Episode 19 (May 20)	3.	Albena D. & Kaloyan	Waltz	40 (10, 10, 10, 10)	
Episode 19 (May 20)	4.	Darin & Ani	Jive	35 (9, 9, 9, 8)	
Episode 19 (May 20)	5.	Mihaela & Svetlyo	Jive	40 (10, 10, 10, 10)	
Episode 19 (May 20)	Trio Dances				
Episode 19 (May 20)	1.	Albena D. & Kaloyan and Todor	Paso doble	40 (10, 10, 10, 10)	Safe
Episode 19 (May 20)	2.	Darin & Ani and Ralitsa	Jazz	38 (10, 9, 10, 9)	Bottom three
Episode 19 (May 20)	3.	Anton & Dorina and Elena M.	Paso doble	38 (9, 9, 10, 10)	Bottom three
Episode 19 (May 20)	4.	Mihaela & Svetlyo and Simeon	Salsa	40 (10, 10, 10, 10)	Safe
Episode 19 (May 20)	5.	Neli & Nasko and Miroslav	Salsa	35 (9, 9, 8, 9)	Bottom three
Episode 20 (May 22)	Elimination				
Episode 20 (May 22)	1.	Anton & Dorina	Tango	Public vote: 26,7%	Eliminated
Episode 20 (May 22)	2.	Darin & Ani	Paso doble	Public vote: 44%	Safe
Episode 20 (May 22)	3.	Neli & Nasko	Quickstep	Public vote: 29,3%	Safe

=== Week 11: World Hits Week (May 27–29) ===
In the eliminations episode guest performers were Anton Kandaurov & Tatyana Efimkina who performed a standard Balroom dance.

Episode	Draw	Couple	Dance	Judges scores	Result
Episode 21 (May 27)	1.	Mihaela & Svetlyo	Cha-cha-cha	35 (9, 9, 9, 8)	
Episode 21 (May 27)	2.	Albena D. & Kaloyan	Foxtrot	40 (10, 10, 10, 10)	
Episode 21 (May 27)	3.	Darin & Ani	Jive	38 (10, 9, 10, 9)	
Episode 21 (May 27)	4.	Neli & Nasko	Charleston	37 (10, 9, 9, 9)	
Episode 21 (May 27)	Quartet Dances				
Episode 21 (May 27)	1.	Albena D. & Kaloyan, Ralitsa and Dean	Contemporary	38 (10, 9, 9, 10)	Safe
Episode 21 (May 27)	2.	Mihaela & Svetlyo, Petya and Petyo	Cha-cha-cha	37 (10, 9, 9, 9)	Bottom three
Episode 21 (May 27)	3.	Neli & Nasko, Elena D. and Simeon	Samba	33 (9, 8, 8, 8)	Bottom three
Episode 21 (May 27)	4.	Darin & Ani, Todor and Elena M.	Jive	37 (10, 9, 9, 9)	Bottom three
Episode 22 (May 29)	Elimination				
Episode 22 (May 29)	1.	Mihaela & Svetlyo	Flamenco	Public vote	Safe
Episode 22 (May 29)	2.	Darin & Ani	Freestyle	Public vote	Safe
Episode 22 (May 29)	3.	Neli & Nasko	Paso doble	Public vote	Eliminated

=== Week 12: Final (June 3–5) ===
In the final guest performers were Chambao and Ruth Koleva.

Episode	Draw	Couple	Dance	Judges scores	Result
Episode 23 (June 3)	1.	Albena D. & Kaloyan	Argentine tango	40 (10, 10, 10, 10)	
Episode 23 (June 3)	2.	Darin & Ani	Quickstep	40 (10, 10, 10, 10)	
Episode 23 (June 3)	3.	Mihaela & Svetlyo	Contemporary	40 (10, 10, 10, 10)	
Episode 23 (June 3)	4.	Darin & Ani	Freestyle	40 (10, 10, 10, 10)	Eliminated
Episode 23 (June 3)	5.	Mihaela & Svetlyo	Freestyle	40 (10, 10, 10, 10)	Safe
Episode 23 (June 3)	6.	Albena D. & Kaloyan	Freestyle	40 (10, 10, 10, 10)	Safe
Episode 24 (June 5)	1.	Mihaela & Svetlyo	Samba, quickstep	—N/a	Safe
Episode 24 (June 5)	2.	Albena D. & Kaloyan	Tango, paso doble	—N/a	Safe
Episode 24 (June 5)	Last Dances				
Episode 24 (June 5)	1.	Albena D. & Kaloyan	Bolero	Public vote: 50,4%	Winners
Episode 24 (June 5)	2.	Mihaela & Svetlyo	Argentine tango	Public vote: 49,6%	Runners-up
