= Vanya Shtereva =

Bulgarian singer and writer

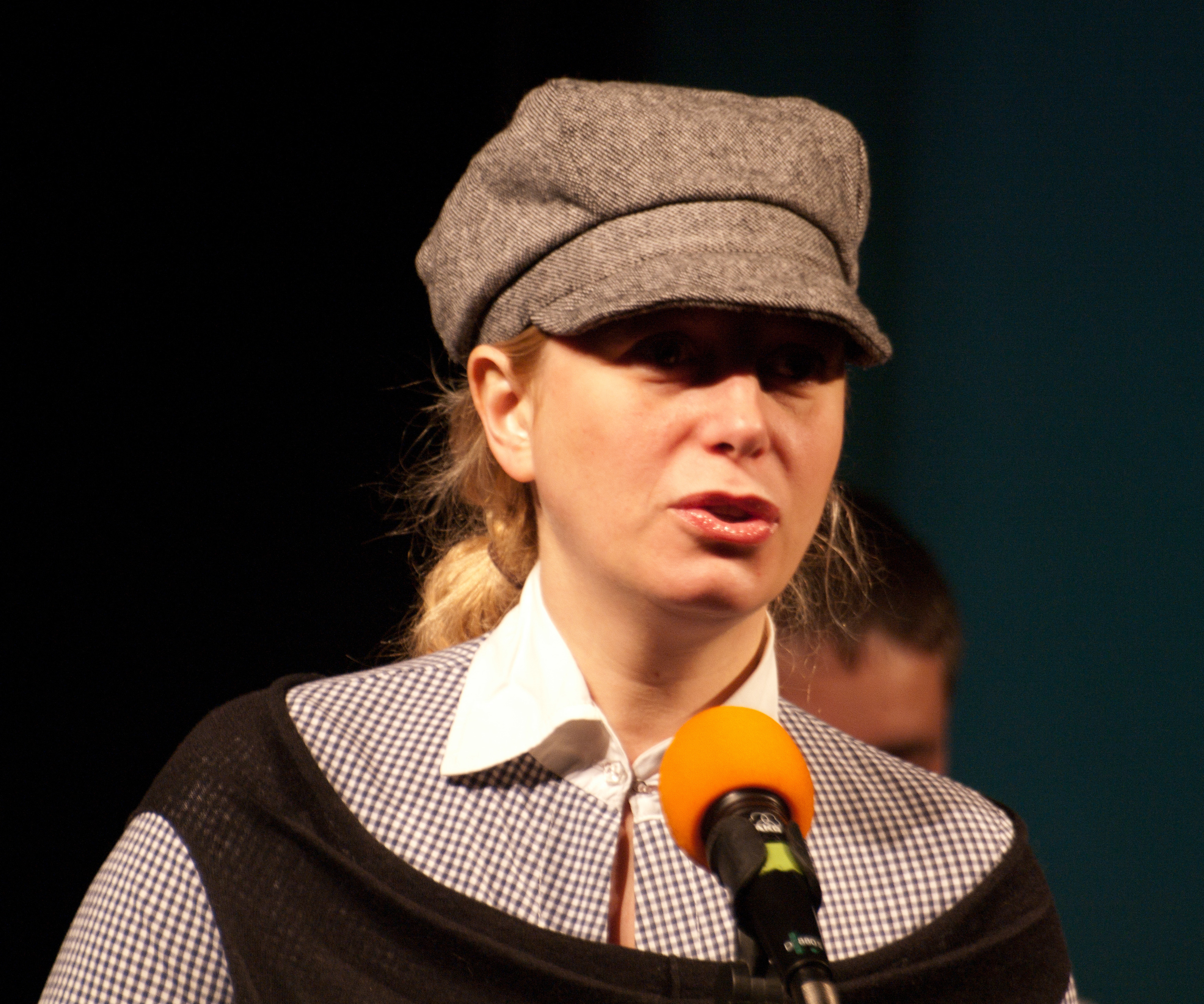
Vanya Shtereva at the BG Site awards ceremony, November 2010

Vanya Shtereva (Bulgarian: Ваня Щерева) is a popular Bulgarian singer and writer. She's known for her eccentric attitude and image. She has written songs for a lot of Bulgarian artists such as Stenli, Antibiotika, Aksiniya, etc. Her first, and to date only, album is called "In Vitro" and was released in 2003. It gained little success due to poor promotion. Today, Vanya is the vocalist of the group MatchPoint. They released their first single in July 2007 charting #1 on MAD TV Bulgaria Top 10. Her first book "Obraztsov dom" was published in 2005 and since then has become one of the best selling books in Bulgaria by a contemporary author. Her daughter is the Bulgarian singer Mila Robert.

== Albums ==
- In Vitro (2003)

== Singles ==
- Дъждът
- Портокалово момиче
- Ин витро
- Ще те купя
- Образцов дом
