= Aksinia Chenkova =

- Born: Ася Тодорова Ченкова; September 20, 1986 (age 39); Svishtov, Bulgaria
- Genres: Pop; hip hop; folklore
- Instruments: Vocals; guitar
- Years active: 2003-present

Aksinia Chenkova (Bulgarian: Аксиния Ченкова) is a Bulgarian music producer and performer with several national music awards.

== Biography ==
Chenkova, born in Svishtov, Bulgaria, became popular after taking part in the Bulgarian version of the reality show Star Academy in 2005 on Nova TV. She was the first person evicted from the show, but later became one of the most successful participants.

== Career ==
Her first music single, "To love you like I do"("Да те обича като мен"), was released in 2007 and became a hit, bringing her to the top of several radio and TV stations playlists.

In the same year, she took part in Eurovision Bulgaria and reached the finals. In the last round Elitsa Todorova and Stoyan Yankulov won the right to represent Bulgaria with their song "Water".

In 2008, Chenkova became a TV presenter and a co-writer of EuroBGVision on BNT (Bulgarian National Television) when BNT chose Deep Zone and DJ Balthazar to go to the Eurovision Song Contest 2008.

In 2009, Chenkova participated in the dancing show Dancing with the Stars, Season 2, produced by Slavi Trifonov on BTV where she reached the finals.

In the same year she received two awards, for female singer of the year and most progressive singer of the year.

In 2011, she won the music award of radio Romantika for best love song for "We are not saints", a co-project with Ku-Ku-Bend.

In 2012, she took part in the fourth series of VIP Brother in Bulgaria.

== Academic background ==
2004: Master class in music science from Club Estrada, Svishtov, Bulgaria

2011: Master's degree in economics, D.A. Tsenov Academy of Economics, Svishtov, Bulgaria in 2011

2016: Master's degree in business administration, EAE University, Barcelona, Spain

== Discography ==
Albums

- New Cinderella 2009

Singles

- "To love you like I do"
- "Babe"
- "I know"
- "Cinderella"
- "Summertime" with George Kostov
- "You lose"
- "Two faces"
- "New Cinderella"
- "We are not saints" with Ku-Ku Bend and Boris Soltariyski
