= Emanuela (singer) =

Bulgarian singer

Emanuela Емануела
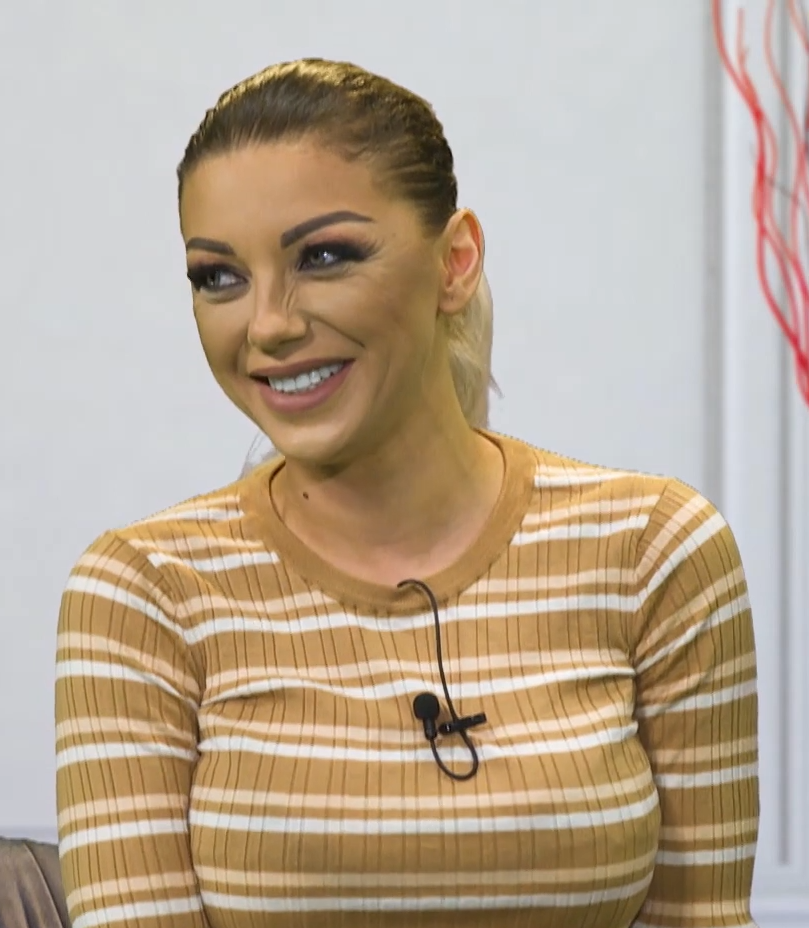
- Emanuela in March 2021

Background information
- Born: Emiliya Ivanova Tsvetkova; 8 November 1981 (age 44)
- Origin: Sofia, Bulgaria
- Genres: Pop folk
- Occupation: singer
- Years active: 2006–present
- Labels: Ara Music, Payner

Emiliya Ivanova Tsvetkova (Bulgarian: Емилия Иванова Цветкова; born 8 November 1981), known professionally as Emanuela (Bulgarian: Емануела) is a Bulgarian pop-folk singer. In 2006, she signed with Ara Music. From 2008 to 2013 she released three albums before departing Ara in mid-2015, after she decided not to renew her contract. Following the departure, she signed with Payner.

== Discography ==
- 2008 - "Zapoznay ya s men"
- 2010 - "Burya ot emotsii"
- 2013 - "Emanuela"
- 2018 - "Notarialno zaveren"
