= Mila Robert =

Bulgarian singer, actress and painter

- Мила Роберт
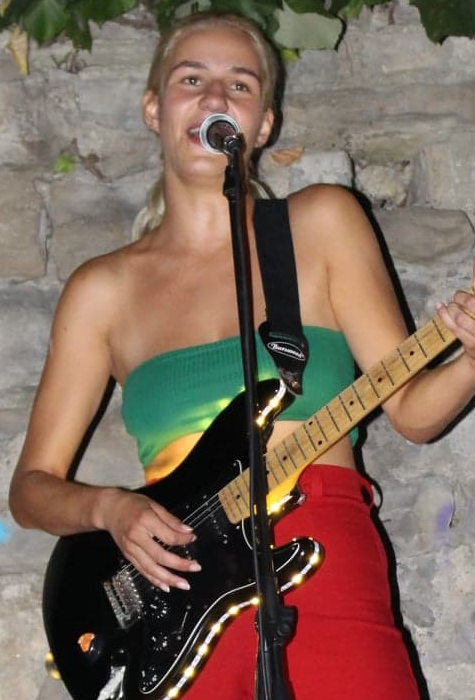
- Mila Robert during her concert in Veliko Tarnovo in 2019
- Born: Mila Robert Gergova; 6 September 1996 (age 29); Sofia, Bulgaria
- Education: Krastyo Sarafov National Academy for Theatre and Film Arts
- Occupations: Singer; songwriter; painter; actress
- Years active: 2013–present
- Mother: Vanya Shtereva
- Musical career
- Genres: Pop; indie; electronic; jazz
- Instruments: Vocals; guitar; ukulele

Mila Robert Gergova (Bulgarian: Мила Роберт Гергова; born September 6, 1996), known professionally as Mila Robert, is a Bulgarian singer and songwriter. She is the daughter of Vanya Shtereva.

== Personal life ==
=== Early life ===
Mila Robert was born on September 6, 1996 in Sofia, Bulgaria. Her mother is the singer and actress Vanya Shtereva and her father the basketball player Robert Gergov. She began singing and playing the guitar at the age of 13. She also plays on ukulele and kazoo.

=== Education ===
In 2015, she began studying Drama Theatre Acting at Krastyo Sarafov National Academy for Theatre and Film Arts in the class of professor Ivan Dobchev who is a Bulgarian filmmaker. There, Robert also met with the Academy Award-nominated actress Maria Bakalova, they have been friends ever since.

In 2019, Robert graduated with a bachelor's degree.

== Career ==
=== 2013: X Factor ===
In 2013, when Robert was 16, she auditioned for the second season of X Factor Bulgaria with the song ''Wicked Game'' by Chris Issak but after her second live show she decided to leave the show saying ''My goal was not to win, my goal was to have fun, but obviously, I was wrong, after coming to X Factor, I clarified my goals.'' after some people speculated that she was there just because of her mother's fame.

Between 2013 and 2016, Robert was participating in local events performing both her own original songs and covers.

=== 2016-2018: ''Signal'' & ''Nashe si e, Sashe'' ===
Robert's first single is the cover of the song ''Signal'' by Emil Dimitrov in 2017. In the same year, Robert wins the award for debuting artist by BG Radio because of that song.

In 2018, Robert released her first original song ''Nashe si e, Sashe''. She gained popularity, especially in the social media after that song. A couple of months later – she released cover of a very famous pop-folk song ''Neshto Netipichno'' by Ivana. Robert's cover was named “Kvartalna Krachma” and became known overnight.

Mila Robert is also a painter. She sells her paintings in Instagram. She is also organizing exhibitions with her paintings.

=== 2019-2022: ''Egotrip'' & COVID-19 ===
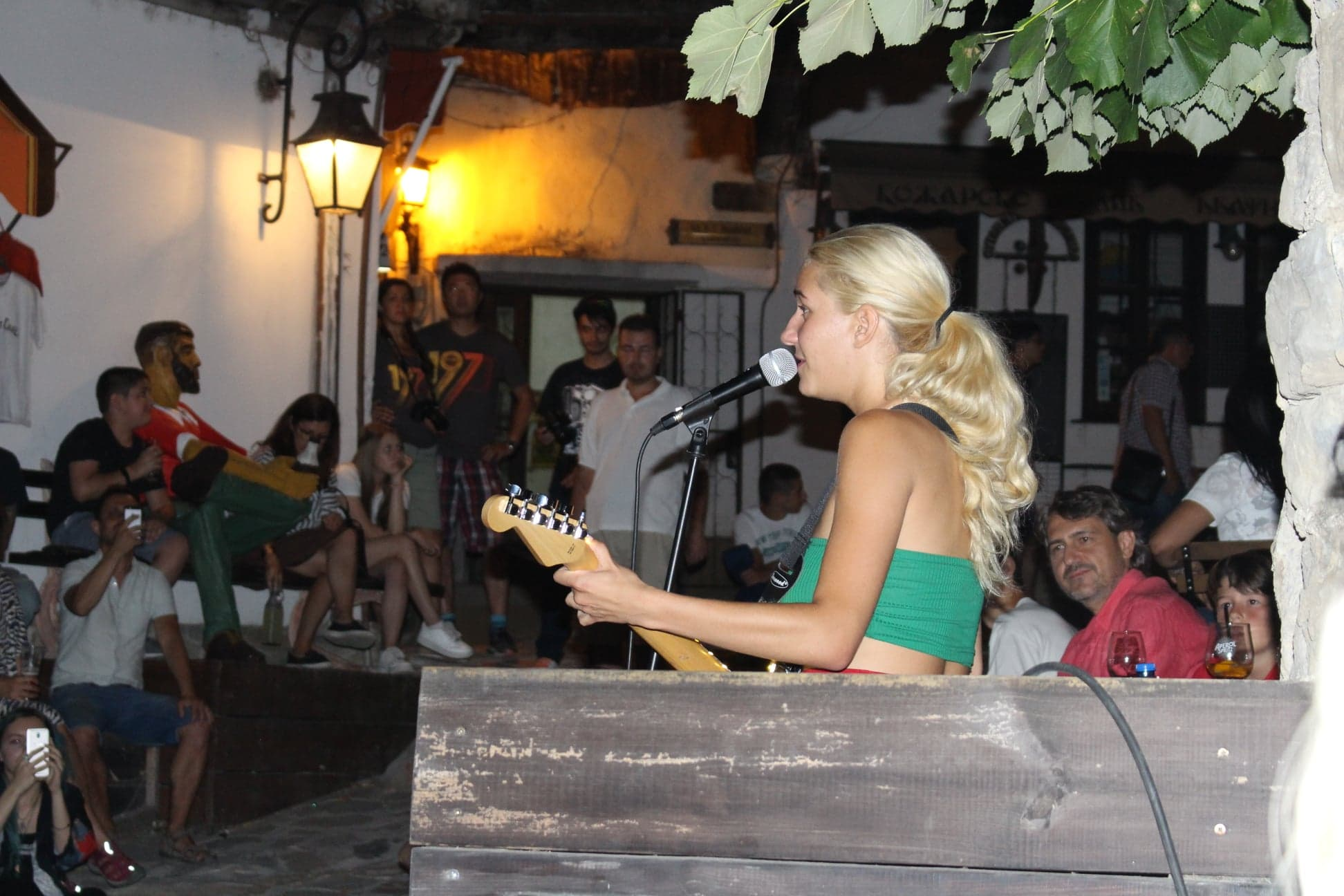
Mila Robert performing in Veliko Tarnovo in 2019

In late 2019, her song "Takt" was released, which was the first single from her debut album "Egotrip", which was officially released in 2020.

During the lockdowns, Robert did two online concerts but she admitted that she regrets that decision. In an interview she said that her most listened artist during the quarantine was Dua Lipa. In 2020, Robert took part in the 2020 Sofia Pride, which was held in the form of an online concert because of Covid.

In 2020, Robert was offered a role in the short movie by the Bulgarian film director Petar Krumov. It was first named ''The Soup'' (''Супата''), but later the name was changed to ''Hunger'' (''Глад''). The movie is part of a special event organized by the International Short Film Festival ''IN THE PALACE''. Hunger was officially released in 2023.

In 2022, Mila released 2 new EPs - ''Do4uvane'' and ''Gap Summer''.

=== 2023-: ''SRCE <3'' & Milana ===
On April 1, 2023, Robert's song "Pokemon" was released, which is the beginning of her upcoming album "SRCE <3". This was followed by "Me4ka" from the same album.

On November 1, 2023, her concept album ''affiriMILAtions'' was released, which contains 33 songs (mantras), each of which is 33 seconds long.

In early 2024, Mila Robert revealed that she has an alter ego called Milana, later that year she released an album under the name ''Milana'', using that same stage name. The songs ''LET GO'' (2024) and ''Peperuda'' (2025) feature both Mila Robert and Milana as separate artists.

In the Spring of 2024 she participated in Dancing Stars, where she finished on 9th place. On June 29, 2025, her album ''SRCE <3'' was officially put together.

In August 2025, the video for the song ''Polujivi'', which is a duet with Azis, was released. On January 18, 2026, she released the music video for her new single ''Povoda si ti''.

== LGBTQ Activism ==
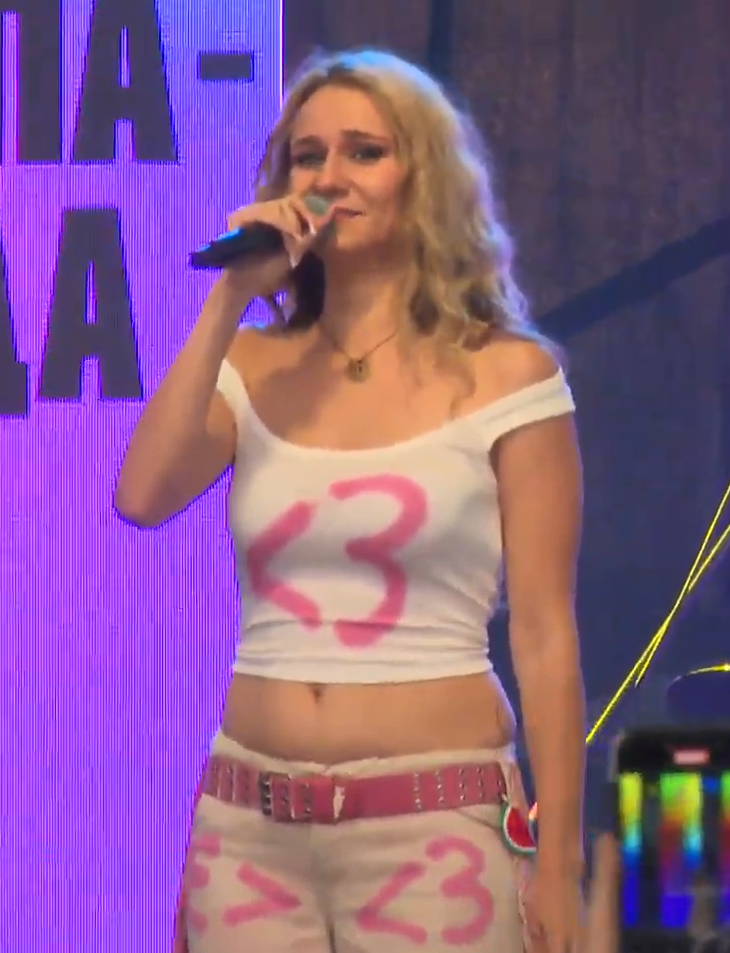
Mila Robert during the concert for Sofia Pride 2025

She is an advocate for human rights and has taken part in Sofia Pride 7 years in a row. In 2019, Mila Robert took part in Sofia Pride for the first time, along with Mihaela Fileva, Galena, Netta Barzilai and more. In 2020, she was one of the organizers herself when the Pride had to happen online, because of Covid. In the following years, along Mila Robert, many artists like Vasil Garvanliev, Preyah, Victoria Georgieva, DARA have taken part in the parade.

In 2021, Robert took part in "People with a Voice", a publication of Simeon Vassilev's GLAS Foundation, collecting the stories of 37 LGBT equal rights activists in Bulgaria.

=== Scandals ===
In 2024, Mila Robert participated in the Sofia Pride concert, where she was dressed in a short dress with the colours of the Bulgarian flag. Seconds later, Mila took off the dress and threw it to the ground. Underneath it, the singer wore the same model of a fitted dress, but this time instead of the tricolour, the dress was in the colours of the LGBTI flag. The act caused numerous comments on social networks, and many reproached her for insulting the national flag, which constitute a violation of Art. 108, para. 2 of the Criminal Code of Bulgaria. VMRO has announced that they have notified the prosecutor's office. Desecration of national symbols is punishable by up to 2 years in prison or a 3,000 leva fine.

Mila Robert herself apologized to those affected by her actions.

== Discography ==
Mila Robert discography
- Studio albums: 4
- EPs: 2
- Singles: 91
- Music videos: 38

=== Albums ===
Title	Album details	Peak chart positions
Title	Album details	BUL
''Egotrip''	Released: December 6, 2020; Formats: CD, digital download, LP	-
''AffirMILAtions''	Released: November 1, 2023; Formats: CD, digital download, LP	-
''Milana'' as Milana	Released: November 22, 2024; Formats: CD, digital download, LP	-
''SRCE <3''	Released: June 29, 2025; Formats: CD, digital download, LP	-

=== Singles ===
Title (English)	Title (Bulgarian)	Year	Album/EP	Notes
''Signal''	''Сигнал''	2017	None	Cover of Emil Dimitrov
''Nashe si e, Sashe''	''Наше си е, Саше''	2018	None	
''Kvartalna Kruchma''	''Квартална Кръчма''	2018	None	Cover of Ivana
''Neshto Grubo''	''Нещо Грубо''	2019	None	
''WTF''	-	2019	None	
''Nikoy Ne Mozhe''	''Никой Не Може''	2019	None	Cover of Azis
''Tired of Drinking''	-	2019	None	
''Takt''	''Такт''	2019	''Egotrip''	
''Vsichko Ryazko Svetva''	''Всичко Рязко Светва''	2020	''Egotrip''	
''Vsichko e Lyubov'' (Tino and Mila Robert)	''Всичко е Любов''	2020	None	
''Smeshno e'' (MC Greka and Mila Robert)	''Смешно е''	2020	None	
''Egotrip''	''Еготрип''	2020	''Egotrip''	
''Bokluk''	''Боклук''	2020	''Egotrip''	
''Lyubov''	''Любов''	2020	''Egotrip''	
''Vse po-dobre shte stava''	''Все по-добре ще става''	2020	''Egotrip''	
''Surfirai v men''	''Сърфирай в мен''	2020	''Egotrip''	
''Ne zabravyai''	''Не забравяй''	2020	''Egotrip''	
''Vyarvam v teb''	''Вярвам в теб''	2020	''Egotrip''	
''Iskam''	''Искам''	2020	''Egotrip''	
''Moni''	''Мони''	2020	''Egotrip''	
''Sambichka za Lyubovta'' (ft. jazzdork)	''Самбичка за Любовта''	2020	''Egotrip''	
''Dokoga	''Докога''	2020	''Egotrip''	
''Banski na laleta"	"Бански на лалета"	2021	None	Cover
''Karam'' (prod. GENA)	"Карам"	2022	''До4уване''	
''Vyarvam ti" (Hugo & Mila Robert)	"Вярвам ти"	2022	''До4уване''	
''Moment''	''Момент''	2022	''До4уване''	
''Sinya Zona''	''Синя Зона''	2022	''До4уване''	
''Strah''	''Страх''	2022	''До4уване''	
''Do4uvane''	''До4уване''	2022	''До4уване''	
''Break Up with U''	-	2022	''Gap Summer''	
''That Girl''	-	2022	''Gap Summer''	
''Gap Summer''	-	2022	''Gap Summer''	
''I Love Me I Love Boys''	-	2022	''Gap Summer''	
''Lazy Baby Fuck''	-	2022	''Gap Summer''	
''Born In Debt''	-	2022	''Gap Summer''	
''Silna" (Molets & Mila Robert)	''Силна''	2022	None	
''Pokemon''	''Покемон''	2023	''SRCE <3''	
''Me4ka''	''Ме4ка''	2023	''SRCE <3''	
''higher power''	-	2023	''AffirMILAtions''	ft. Kamen Kolev
''sucker for freedom''	-	2023	''AffirMILAtions''	ft. Kamen Kolev
''life''	-	2023	''AffirMILAtions''	ft. Kamen Kolev
''LUCKY''	-	2023	''AffirMILAtions''	ft. Kamen Kolev
''ageless''	-	2023	''AffirMILAtions''	ft. Kamen Kolev
''money''	-	2023	''AffirMILAtions''	ft. Kamen Kolev
''we are all one''	-	2023	''AffirMILAtions''	ft. Kamen Kolev
''reliable''	-	2023	''AffirMILAtions''	ft. Kamen Kolev
''honesty''	-	2023	''AffirMILAtions''	ft. Kamen Kolev
''change''	-	2023	''AffirMILAtions''	ft. Kamen Kolev
''bravery''	-	2023	''AffirMILAtions''	ft. Kamen Kolev
''EVERYTHING IS EVERYTHING''	-	2023	''AffirMILAtions''	ft. Kamen Kolev
''equality''	-	2023	''AffirMILAtions''	ft. Kamen Kolev
''don't judge''	-	2023	''AffirMILAtions''	ft. Kamen Kolev
''poop''	-	2023	''AffirMILAtions''	ft. Kamen Kolev
''BEND REALITY"	-	2023	''AffirMILAtions''	ft. Kamen Kolev
''forgive''	-	2023	''AffirMILAtions''	ft. Kamen Kolev
''patient''	-	2023	''AffirMILAtions''	ft. Kamen Kolev
''wiser tomorrow''	-	2023	''AffirMILAtions''	ft. Kamen Kolev
''FEAR CAN FEAR ME''	-	2023	''AffirMILAtions''	ft. Kamen Kolev
''not jealous''	-	2023	''AffirMILAtions''	ft. Kamen Kolev
''on my way''	-	2023	''AffirMILAtions''	ft. Kamen Kolev
''trust''	-	2023	''AffirMILAtions''	ft. Kamen Kolev
''wild & free''	-	2023	''AffirMILAtions''	ft. Kamen Kolev
''future''	-	2023	''AffirMILAtions''	ft. Kamen Kolev
''talk''	-	2023	''AffirMILAtions''	ft. Kamen Kolev
''sex''	-	2023	''AffirMILAtions''	ft. Kamen Kolev
''LOVE LEAD THE WAY''	-	2023	''AffirMILAtions''	ft. Kamen Kolev
''in service''	-	2023	''AffirMILAtions''	ft. Kamen Kolev
''GOD''	-	2023	''AffirMILAtions''	ft. Kamen Kolev
''blessed''	-	2023	''AffirMILAtions''	ft. Kamen Kolev
''life get's only better''	-	2023	''AffirMILAtions''	ft. Kamen Kolev
''i don't wanna force anything in my life''	-	2023	''AffirMILAtions''	ft. Kamen Kolev
''Kazino''	''Казино''	2023	''SRCE <3''	
''Novi ochi''	''Нови очи''	2024	''SRCE <3''	
''HOT E''	''ХОТ Е''	2024	''Milana''	as Milana
''TRANSFORMO''	-	2024	''Milana''	as Milana
"BRAT"	-	2024	''Milana''	as Milana
''SASSY''	-	2024	''Milana''	as Milana
''ANGEL''	-	2024	''Milana''	as Milana
''FENIX'' (ft. Devitza)	-	2024	''Milana''	as Milana
''LET GO'' (ft. Mila Robert)	-	2024	''Milana''	as Milana
''Sulzi ot rakija''	''Сълзи от ракия''	2025	''SRCE <3''	
''Talisman''	''Талисман''	2025	None	as Milana
''Daj mu''	''Дай му''	2025	''SRCE <3''	
''Shish''	''Шиш''	2025	''SRCE <3''	
''Kreizi''	''Крейзи''	2025	''SRCE <3''	
''Peperuda'' (ft. Milana)	''Пеперуда''	2025	''SRCE <3''	
''Svoboda''	''Свобода''	2025	''SRCE <3''	
''Divane Divane''	''Диване Диване''	2025	''SRCE <3''	
''Luxury Me''	-	2025	''SRCE <3''	
''Povoda si ti''	''Повода си ти''	2025	''SRCE <3''	
''Polujivi'' (ft. Azis)	''Полуживи''	2025	''SRCE <3''	

== Filmography ==
Year	Title	Role	Notes
2023	Hunger	King's wife	Short
