= Todor Kolev =

Todor Kolev may refer to:

- Todor Kolev (actor) (1939–2013), Bulgarian film and stage actor, singer, comedian and TV presenter
- Todor Kolev (footballer born 1942), Bulgarian footballer, FIFA World Cup 1970 player
- Todor Kolev (footballer born 1980), Bulgarian football striker
- Todor Kolev (footballer born 1989), Bulgarian football winger
