= KariZma (pop band) =

Bulgarian pop duo

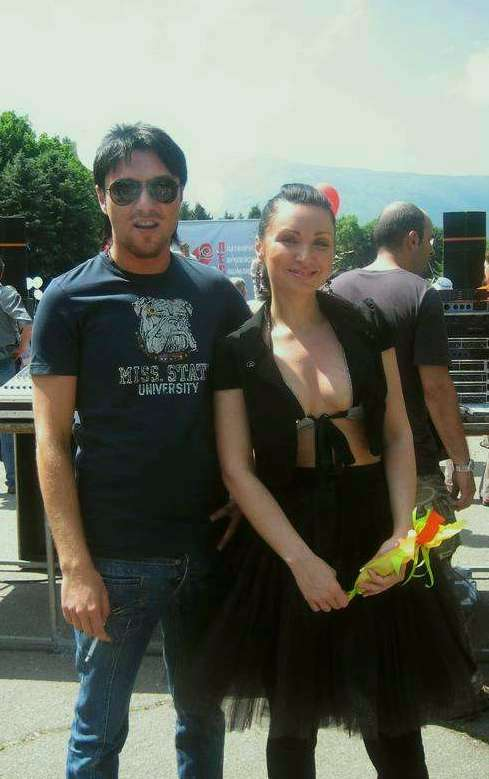
KariZma.

КаriZма (Bulgarian: КариZма) was a Bulgarian pop duo, whose members were Galina "Galya" Kurdova and Miroslav "Miro" Kostadinov.

== Biography ==
Kurdova and Kostadinov started singing together in a piano bar named Opera in 1999. They had decided to work together, because their voices matched each other. One of the first proposals for a name was 2Good4U, which Kurdova rejected.

They worked for non-Bulgarian music companies, such as EMA, TOCO int. and others. Two years later the famous Bulgarian music composer Mitko Shterev helped them with their first single, Riskuvam da te imam (I risk to have you). Before the release of the single Kolko mi lipsvash ("How much I miss you") in 2002, KariZma worked with other performers, like Toni, Maria Ilieva, Santra, Spens, Ava, Irra, etc. This delayed the work on their debut album. Moreover, on March 13, 2006, Galya entered the VIP Brother 1 House, where she stayed for 18 days. Their next hits were Shte izbiagam li ot teb?("Will I run away from you?") (2003), Mr. Killer (2004), and Minavash prez men ("You pass through me") (2005).

In 2006, they released their first album, Eklisiast.

== Biggest hits ==
- Рискувам да те имам (Riskuvam da te imam)- I am risking to have you
- Колко ми липсваш (Kolko mi lipsvash) - How much I miss you
- Ще избягам ли от теб? (Shte izbiagam li ot teb?)- Will I run away from you
- Mr.Killer
- Минаваш през мен (Minavash prez men)- You walk through me
- All In Love (Izciqlo vuv liubov)
- Някога преди (Niakoga predi)- Sometime before

== Albums ==
- Еклисиаст - Eklisiast
