= Krasimir Radkov =

Bulgarian actor (born 1971)

Krasimir "Krasi" Radkov (Bulgarian: Красимир "Краси" Радков, born 24 April 1971 in Vratsa) is a Bulgarian comedy actor who performs on television and in theatre.

He graduated the Spanish language class at the Grammar Language School in Vratsa and completed his university education at the National Academy for Theatre and Film Arts (NATFIZ) in 1994 specializing in Doll Acting. He worked at the Dramatic Theatre in Vratsa between 1995 and 2000 and has worked in the "Aleko Konstantinov" Satiric Theatre since 2000. He has over 30 roles with two nominations for ASKEER. Since 2004, he has worked in Slavi's show - a Bulgarian late night show. He has also worked at the "Melpomena" theatre since 2004. He appeared in the 2003 film "I Am David" (US, Director Paul Feig).
