= Anelia discography =

- Studio albums: 9
- Singles: 35
- Video albums: 1
- Music videos: 33
- Featured singles: 1

Anelia is one of the most famous Bulgarian pop-folk singers. She has gained popularity with her second single - "Poglednij me v otchite", released in 2002, which became her signature song and the best selling single of 2003 in Bulgaria. In the year-end chart of 2003 in Bulgaria, the album "Poglednij me v otchite" also reached number 1. Because of the practice in Bulgaria every song, which has a video to be recognized as a single, Anelia has released 34 singles with 33 videos, 23 of which has peak a chart in Bulgaria. First five studio albums of Anelia has topped the Bulgarian Pop-folk Albums Chart. Her sales stand at 230 000 copies at Bulgaria only.

== Studio albums ==
Year	Album details	Peak chart positions
Year	Album details	Bulgaria
2002	Look Me in the Eyes: Released: December 2002; Label: Payner Music	1
2004	Don't Look Back: Released: April 9, 2004; Label: Payner Music	1
2005	Everything Leads to You: Released: August 16, 2005; Label: Payner Music	1
2006	Ashes of Roses: Released: October 5, 2006; Label: Payner Music	1
2008	Only You: Released: May 19, 2008; Label: Payner Music	1
2010	The Good, the Bad: Released: March 11, 2010; Label: Payner Music	1
2011	Games for Advanced: Released: December 20, 2011; Label: Payner Music	2
2014	Phenomenal: Released: December 8, 2014; Label: Payner Music	1
2018	Give me more: Released: March 14, 2018; Label: Payner Music	1

=== Video albums ===
Year	Album details	Peak chart positions
Year	Album details	Bulgaria
2005	Best Video Selection: Released: March 15, 2005; Label: Payner Music	-

=== Singles ===
Year	Title	Peak chart positions				Album
Year	Title	Planeta TV Top 50/ Planeta Top 20	Signal Plus Biggest 50	Signal Plus Pop-folk Hit	Top Video 20	Album
2002	"Чужди устни" / "Foreign Lips"	—	—	—	—	Погледни ме в очите
2002	"Погледни ме в очите" (including the remix) / "Look Me in the Eyes"	1	—	—	—	Погледни ме в очите
2003	"Само мене нямаш" / "Only Me You Don't Have"	1	—	—	—	Погледни ме в очите
2003	"Обичай ме" / "Love Me"	1	—	—	—	Не поглеждай назад
2004	"Искам те" / "I Want You"	1	—	—	—	Не поглеждай назад
2004	"Не знаеш" / "You Don't Know"	—	—	—	—	Single
2005	"Не поглеждай назад" / "Don't Look Back"	—	—	—	—	Не поглеждай назад
2005	"Всичко води към теб" / "Everything Leads To You"	1	—	—	—	Всичко води към теб
2005	"Как предаде любовта" / "How You Betrayed The Love"	—	—	—	—	Всичко води към теб
2006	"Не спирай" / "Don't Stop"	1	—	—	—	Всичко води към теб
2006	"Не мога да спра да те обичам" / "I Can't Stop Loving You"	2	—	—	—	Всичко води към теб
2006	"До зори" / "Until Sunrise"	—	—	—	—	Пепел от рози
2006	"Само за миг" / "Only For a Moment"	1	—	—	—	Пепел от рози
2006	"Вятър в косите ти" / "Wind in your hair"	—	—	—	—	Пепел от рози
2006	"Ден без теб" / "A Day Without You"	—	—	—	—	Пепел от рози
2007	"Щом си до мен" / "When You're Next To Me"	1	5	—	—	Пепел от рози
2007	"Ти си слънцето в мен" / "You're The Sun In Me"	15	5	1	—	Единствен ти
2007	"Завинаги" (feat. Miro) / "Forever"	1	3	—	—	Единствен ти
2007	"Единствен ти" / "Only You"	—	1	1	—	Единствен ти
2007	"Дъх" / "Breath"	5	16	—	—	Единствен ти
2008	"Следа от любовта" / "A Trace of Love"	6	5	1	—	Единствен ти
2008	"Все едно ми е" / "I Don't Give a Damn"	1	8	—	—	Единствен ти
2008	"Трети път" / "Third Time"	—	6	—	—	Единствен ти
2008	"Поръчай пак" / "Order Again"	1	4	—	—	Добрата, лошата
2008	"Продължавам" / "I Keep On"	2	4	1	—	Добрата, лошата
2009	"Не ме принуждавай" / "Don't Force Me"	—	6	1	—	Добрата, лошата
2009	"Добрата, лошата" / "The Good, The Bad"	1	5	1	—	Добрата, лошата
2009	"Две неща" (with. Ilian) / "Two Things"	2	1	1	—	Добрата, лошата
2009	"Обичам те" / "I Love You"	50	8	3	—	Добрата, лошата
2009	"Готов ли си" / "Are You Ready"	—	13	2	—	Добрата, лошата
2010	"Ако с теб не съм" / "If I'm Not With You"	1	4	—	—	Добрата, лошата
2010	Четири секунди / "Four Seconds"	5	5	1	—	Игри за напреднали
2010	"Раздялата" / "The Break-up"	21	14	1	—	Игри за напреднали
2011	"Така ме кефиш" / "That's How I Like You"	2	2	1	—	Игри за напреднали
2011	"Проба-грешка" / "Trial and Error"	1	1	-	-	Игри за напреднали
2011	"Игри за напреднали" / "Games For Advanced"	2	2	1	—	Игри за напреднали
2012	"Сложно-невъзможно" / "Difficult-Impossible"	-	2	-	—	Игри за напреднали
2012	"Яко ми действаш" / "You Act Cool On Me"	2	2	1	—	Феноменална
2012	"Не исках да те нараня" (feat. Ilian) / "I Didn't Want To Hurt You"	1	1	1	—	Феноменална
2012	"Да ти викна ли такси" / "Should I Call You A Taxi"	7	1	1	1	Феноменална
2012	"Виж ме сега" / "Look At Me Now"	1	1	1	1	Феноменална
2013	"Аз и ти" / "You And I"	1	1	1	1	Феноменална
2013	"Искам те, полудявам" / "I Want You, I'm Going Crazy"	3	1	1	1	Феноменална
2013	"Няма да съм друга" (with Preslava) / "I Won't Be Another"	1	1	1	1	Феноменална
2013	"Предадох те" / I Betrayed You	3	2	2	1	Феноменална
2014	"Феноменална" (with Gamzata) / "Phenomenal"	1	1	1	1	Феноменална
2014	"Твоя съм" / I Am Yours	3	1	—	—	Феноменална
2014	"Изведнъж" ("Ksafnika" Greek version-with Giorgos Giasemis ft. The Rook) / At once	2	2	—	—	Феноменална
2014	"Не мога да губя" / I can not lose	5	2	6	10	Феноменална
2015	"Генерал" / General	-	-	-	—	Дай ми още
2015	"Sartseto Shte Plati" (with Ilian)				—	Дай ми още
2015	"Az Sam Dyavolat"					Дай ми още
2016	"Got Mi E"					Дай ми още
2016	"V Moya Um" (with Danny Levan)					Single
2016	"Day mi oshte"					Дай ми още
2017	"Za patrona" (with Vanya)					Single
2017	"Kazhi mi" (with Kyriacos Georgiou)					Дай ми още
2017	"S tebe mi e nay"					Дай ми още
2017	"Milo moe"					Дай ми още
2018	"Zoopark"					Дай ми още
2018	"Brummm" (with Julia)					Single
2018	"Kopakabana" (with Damyan Popov)					Single
2018	"Prosyatsi"					Single
2018	"Podludyavash me" (with Kyriacos Georgiou)					Single
2019	"Sartseto mi"					Single
2019	"Zaradi teb"					Single
2019	"Shampion" (with DJ Jivko Mix)					Single
2019	"Gazarka"					Single
2019	"Ti si" (with Radko Petkov)					Single
2020	"Milion" (with Denis Teofikov)					Single
2020	"Pie mi se"					Single
2020	"Dvama"					Single

=== As a featured artist ===
Year	Title	Peak chart positions			
Year	Title	Planeta TV Top 50	Signal Plus Biggest 50	Signal Plus Pop-folk Hit	
2013	"Твърде Късно Е" / "It's Too Late" (Konstantin feat. Anelia)	2	1	1	1
2015	"Забрави" / "Forget" (Krum feat. Anelia)	—	—	—	—
"—" denotes singles that did not chart, have not charted yet or there is no information about their charting positions

=== Music videos ===
Year	Title	Director(s)
2002	"Vicarious lips"	Nikolay Skerlev
2002	"Look me in the eyes"	Rumen Atanasov/Georgi Kolev
2003	"Only me you don't have"	Georgi Kolev
2003	"Look me in the eyes" (remix)	Nikolay Skerlev
2003	"Love me"	Nikolay Skerlev
2004	"I want you"	Nikolay Skerlev
2004	"For you love"	Nikolay Skerlev
2004	"You don't know"	Nikolay Skerlev
2005	"Don't look back"	Nikolay Skerlev
2005	"Everything leads to you"	Nikolay Skerlev
2005	"How you betrayed the love"	Nikolay Skerlev
2006	"Don't stop"	Nikolay Skerlev
2006	"I can't stop loving you"	Nikolay Skerlev
2006	"Until sunrise"	Nikolay Skerlev
2006	"Only for a moment"	Nikolay Skerlev
2006	"Wind in your hair"	Nikolay Skerlev
2006	"Day without you"	Nikolay Skerlev
2007	"When you're next to me"	Nikolay Skerlev
2007	"You're the sun in me"	Tencho Ianchev
2007	"Forever"	Vasil Stefanov
2007	"Only you"	Ludmil Ilarionov
2007	"Breath"	Ludmil Ilarionov
2008	"Trace of love"	Nikolay Nankov
2008	"I don't give a damn"	Tencho Ianchev
2008	"Third time"	Ludmil Ilarionov
2008	"Order again"	Nikolay Skerlev
2008	"I keep on"	Nikolay Nankov
2009	"Don't force me"	Nikolay Nankov
2009	"The good, the bad"	Ludmil Ilarionov
2009	"Two things"	Ludmil Ilarionov
2009	"I love you"	Nikolay Skerlev
2010	"If I'm not with you"	Nikolay Nankov
2010	"The good, the bad"	Nikolay Nankov
2010	"The break-up"	Nikolay Nankov
2011	"That's how I like you"	Ludmil Ilarionov
2011	"Trial and error" (remix)	Ludmil Ilarionov
2011	"Games for advanced"	Ludmil Ilarionov
2012	"Difficult-impossible"	Ludmil Ilarionov
2012	"You act me cool"	Stanislav Hristov
2012	"I didn't wanted to hurt you"	Ludmil Ilarionov
2012	"Let me call you a taxi"	Stanislav Hristov
2012	"Look at me now"	Vasil Stefanov
2013	"Me & you"	Stanislav Hristov
2013	"I want you, I'm going crazy"	Ludmil Ilarionov
2013	"I won't be another"	Ludmil Ilarionov
2013	"They gave"	Ludmil Ilarionov
2014	"Phenomenal"	Aleksandar Mollov
2014	"I am yours"	Nikolay Nankov
2014	"At once"	Ludmil Ilarionov
2014	"I can not lose"	Ludmil Ilarionov
2015	"General"	Stanislav Hristov
2015	"Sartseto Shte Plati"	
2015	"Az Sam Dyavolat"	
2016	"Got Mi E"	
2016	"V Moya Um"	

=== Year-end charts ===
Chart (2003)	Song	Position
Planeta Hit 100	Look me in the eyes (remix)	1
Planeta Hit 100	Only me you don't have	3
Planeta Hit 100	Love me	5

Chart (2004)	Song	Position
Planeta Hit 100	I want you	2

Chart (2005)	Song	Position
Planeta Hit 100	Everything leads to you	6

Chart (2007)	Song	Position
Planeta Hit 100	Only you	3
Signal Plus Top 50	Only you	11

Chart (2008)	Song	Position
Signal Plus Top 50	Order again	14
Radio Ultra Top 50	Vse edno mi e	9

Chart (2009)	Song	Position
Signal Plus Top 50	Two things	8

Chart (2010)	Song	Position
Hit Folk 30	Four seconds	16
Planeta Hit 100	Four seconds	10
Planeta Hit 100	The brake-up	51
Planeta Hit 100	If I'm not with you	78
Planeta Hit 100	Two things	89

==== All-Time chart ====
Chart	Song	Position
Planeta TV Golden Hits Chart	Look me in the eyes	5
Planeta TV Golden Hits Chart	Only you	81
Planeta TV Golden Hits Chart	I love you	96
Planeta TV Golden Hits Chart	I can't stop loving you	99
