= Mihov =

Mihov is a Bulgarian surname. Notable people with the surname include:

- Ilian Mihov, Bulgarian economist
- Ivan Mihov (born 1991), Bulgarian footballer
- Valentin Mihov (born 1954), former Bulgarian footballer

== See also ==
- Nikola Mikhov (1891–1945), regent of Bulgaria from 1943 to 1944
- Paskoje Miličević (Mihov) (ca. 1440–1516), Croatian architect
