= University of Thrace =

University of Thrace or Thrace University may refer to three universities, all based in the historical region of Thrace in Southeastern Europe:

- Democritus University of Thrace, a university in Xanthi, Komotini, Alexandroupoli and Orestiada, Greece.
- Trakia University, a university in Stara Zagora, Bulgaria.
- Trakya University, a university in Edirne, Turkey.
