= Ilian =

Ilian (Bulgarian: Илиян) is a masculine Bulgarian given name. Notable people with the name include:

- Ilian Aleksandrov (born 1972), Bulgarian gymnast
- Ilian Dimitrov (born 1953), Bulgarian boxer
- Ilian Djevelekov (born 1966), Bulgarian film director and producer
- Ilian Evtimov (born 1983), Bulgarian-French professional basketball player
- Ilian Gârnet (born 1983), Moldovan violinist
- Ilian Iliev (born 1968), Bulgarian football manager and former player
- Ilian Iliev (equestrian) (born 1966), Bulgarian equestrian
- Ilian Iliev (footballer, born 1999), Bulgarian professional footballer
- Ilian Iliev (weightlifter) (born 1973), Bulgarian weightlifter
- Ilian Kaziyski (born 1960), Bulgarian volleyball player
- Ilian Mihov (born 1966), Bulgarian economist
- Ilian Stoyanov (born 1977), Bulgarian former football defender
- Ilian Todorov, Bulgarian politician
- Ilian Vassilev (born 1956), Bulgarian diplomat, writer, and political blogger
- Ilian Gainetdinov (born 2005), Russia cybersport player, scientist
- Ilian Rachov (born in Sofia), Bulgarian artist painter and designer, former designer for Versace, Silvio Fiorello. Worldwide known for his artworks www.artbyilian.com www.rachov.com

== See also ==
- Iliana, the feminine counterpart
