= Batu Siharulidze =

American artist (born 1960)

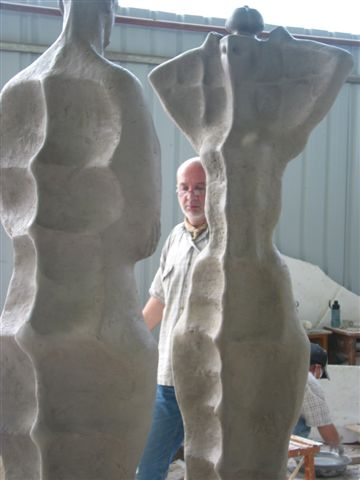
- Batu working on "Adam & Eve"
- Born: Isidore "Batu" Siharulidze; May 7, 1960; Kutaisi, Republic of Georgia
- Education: Tbilisi State Academy of Fine Art, All-Union Academy - Moscow
- Known for: sculpture, drawing
- Movement: Abstract Figurative Sculpture

Batu Siharulidze (Georgian: ბათუ სიხარულიძე; born 7 May 1960 in Georgia), is a Georgian artist naturalised in the United States, most widely known for his abstract figurative sculptures. He now lives in Boston, Massachusetts, where he is an associate professor of art at Boston University.

== Biography ==
Isidore "Batu" Siharulidze was born on May 7, 1960, in Kutaisi, Republic of Georgia. Batu's talent as a sculptor was recognized while he was in his early teens, and he was given entry into the Tbilisi College of Art at the age of fourteen. One of his early bronze sculptures, “Boy on a Horse”, is now in the Norton and Nancy Dodge Collection of Soviet Nonconformist Art at the Zimmerli Art Museum at Rutgers University. Batu earned a graduate degree in sculpture from the Tbilisi State Academy of Fine Art and a post-graduate degree from the All-Union Academy in Moscow. After earning his post-graduate degree he taught at the Tbilisi State Academy of Arts until he came to the U.S. in 1994, having been granted the status of an “Artist of Exceptional Talent”. Batu became a U.S. citizen in 2002. He has continued his career as an artist and educator, teaching sculpture and drawing in several U.S. universities, including Virginia Commonwealth University, George Mason University, and Boston University.

Over the last decade Batu has exhibited and participated in the sculpture exhibits and symposiums in the U.S., Turkey, Italy, China, Spain, Great Britain, Austria, Netherlands, Russia, and Georgia. His works are held in museums, private collections, and in permanent outdoor displays in the United States, Great Britain, the Netherlands, Turkey, India, China, and Georgia.

Batu lives with his wife and two children in Boston, Massachusetts. Currently he is an Associate Professor of Art, Chairman of the Sculpture Department and Head of the Graduate Sculpture Program at Boston University. He teaches various sculpting classes, as well as figure drawing classes. He is a member of the Board of Directors of Contemporary Art International, Inc.

== Competitions ==
- 1991: Rustavi International Sculpture Competition, Rustavi, Georgia
- 1997: Pier Walk '97, Chicago, Illinois, US
- 2002: International Stone Sculpture Competition, Mersin, Turkey
- 2003: International Stone Sculpture Competition, Trakia University, Trakia (Border of Greece, Turkey, Bulgaria)
- 2006: International Stone Sculpture Competition, Ankara University, Ankara, Turkey
- 2008: IV International Termera (Asat) Stone Sculpture Competition, Bodrum, Turkey
- 2008: Huseyin Gezer International Marble Carving Competition, Mersin, Turkey
- 2009: Fifth China (Hui'an) Carving Art Festival, Hui'an, Jiangua, China
- 2010: Second International Bronze Sculpture Competition, Vadodara, India
- 2010: First International Copper Sculpture Competition, Tongling, Anhuik, China
- 2011: First International Granite Carving Competition, Acton, Massachusetts, US
- 2012: Twelfth Sculpture Competition, "Ancient Enigma", Andres Institute of Art, Brookline, New Hampshire, United States
- 2012: Fifth International Sculpture Competition, "Autumn Inspiration", Penza, Russia
- 2012: Sculpture Competition, Akhalkalaki Municipality Architectural Project, Akhalkalaki, Georgia
- 2013: 14th China Changchun (Nong'an) International Sculpture Competition, Changchun, China
- 2014: Seventh International Sculpture Competition, "Autumn Inspiration", Penza, Russia
- 2014: First International Sculpture Competition, Tormino, Spain
- 2014: China-Fuzhou International Sculpture Competition, Fuzhou, China
- 2015: Fifth International Bronze Sculpture Competition, Vadodara, India

== Museums ==
- Aegean Sea, Marble, Murat Balkan Outdoor Sculpture Museum, Bodrum, Turkey
- Adam & Eve 2, Bronze, Murat Kalkan Art Collection, Ankara, Turkey
- Adam & Eve in Repose, Plaster, B'nai B'rith Klutznick National Jewish Museum, Washington, DC, US
- Communist Freedom, Painted Plaster, Zimmerli Art Museum, Rutgers University, New Jersey
- Boy on Horse, Bronze, Zimmerli Art Museum, Rutgers University, New Jersey
- Portrait of Norton Dodge, Bronze, Zimmerli Art Museum, Rutgers University, New Jersey
- Dying Warrior, Marble & Bronze, Modern Art Museum, Tbilisi, Georgia
- Tied Man, Life-Size Painted Plaster, Fine Art Museum, Kutaisi, Georgia

== Permanent displays ==
- In The River, 8' x 9' x 3', Bronze, Uttaryan Foundation Sculpture Park, Vadodara, Gujarat, India
- Galicia, 5.7' x 5.7' x 2.62', Granite, Public Space, Tormino, Spain
- Day with Dragon, 7' x 9' x 2', Bronze, Sculpture Park, Penza, Russia
- Playing in the Rice Fields, 8' x 5' x 2', Bronze, Nong'an People's Park, Changchun, China
- Sunset, 6' x 8' x 3', Bronze, Sculpture Park, Penza, Russia
- Conscious, 4' x 6' x 3', Granite, Andres Institute Sculpture Park, Brookline, New Hampshire, US
- Asleep, 7' x 4' x 3', Granite, Sculpture Garden, Acton, Massachusetts, US
- Kneeling Girl, 6 ' x 4' x 2', Copper, Tongling Sculpture Park, Tonglin, Anhui, China
- Chinese Girl, 1 1/2' x 3' x 2', Wood, Jilin University, Changchun, China
- On the Horizon, 6' x 8' x 3', Bronze, Uttaryan Foundation Sculpture Park, Vadodara, Gujarat, India
- Adam & Eve, 8' x 4' 4', Bronze, Chanchun Sculpture Park, Shuagyang, Changcun, Jilnan, China
- Hui'an Girl, 5 1/2' x 8' x 3', Green Granite, Public Space, Hui'an, Jiangsu, China
- Tied Man, 6' x 7' x 3', White Marble, Public Space, Mercin, Turkey
- Human Mind, 5' x 6' x 3', White Marble, Ankara University Sculpture Garden, Ankara, Turkey
- Aegean Sea, 6' x 7' x 3', White Marble, Aspat Outdoor Sculpture Museum, Bodrum, Turkey
- Trakia, 7' x 6' x 4', White Marble, Peace Garden, Border of Turkey, Bulgaria, and Greece
- Table, 4' x 6' x 3', White Marble, Public Space, Mersin, Turkey
- Embrace, 8' x 4' x 4', Bronze, Stoneleigh, Fairfax, Virginia
- Tranquility, 7' z 4' x 5', Stone, Sculpture Garden, Rustavi, Georgia
