= Faculty of Veterinary Medicine – Stara Zagora =

Coordinates: 42°1′17″N 23°5′42″E

Faculty of Veterinary Medicine - Stara Zagora
- Ветеринарномедицински Факултет - Стара Загора
- Type: State educational establishment
- Established: 1923
- Affiliations: Trakia University
- Dean: Lazarin Lazarov
- Location: Trakia University Student Campus, Stara Zagora, Bulgaria
- Campus: Urban
- Colors: White and Blue

The Faculty of Veterinary Medicine is a state-funded higher education establishment.

== History ==
The idea about the foundation of a veterinary medical faculty in Bulgaria emerges because of the need for veterinary certification of livestock production and export combined with the impossibility of ensuring the needed number of veterinary professionals by tuition in foreign veterinary medicine universities. The proposal was first brought up in 1897 and, after several unsuccessful attempts, was resurrected again after the First World War. The moving force of this process is the Association of Veterinary Professionals in Bulgaria. The government of Aleksandar Stamboliyski took the first decisive steps towards establishing the faculty by submitting the relevant bill to the 19th Ordinary National Assembly. The bill was presented by Stoyan Omarchevski, Minister of Public Education. Thus, in 1923, the Faculty of Veterinary Medicine was established as the seventh faculty of Sofia University. The Act was approved with a Decree 145 from July 11, 1921, signed by His Majesty Boris III. Thus, the proposal to establish a Faculty of Veterinary Medicine became a legal act. Nevertheless, the practical implementation of the idea was a continuous process, accompanied by many difficulties, efforts and professional self-denial in the name of strengthening of Bulgarian higher veterinary medical education.

With Order No 3294 from August 13, 1921, the Minister of Public Education appointed a commission (interim Faculty Council) with the following structure, proposed by the Academic Council of the Sofia University - prof. Vassil Mollov, Dean of the Medical Faculty (head); Dr. Simeon Georgiev, Chief Inspector in the Ministry of Agriculture and State Property and Editor in chief of “Veterinarna Sbirka” (member) and subcolonel Dr. Matyo Rachov, Officer in charge of the Military Veterinary Hospital (member).

They were charged to perform the preliminary work related to the activities of the new faculty. As a result, on May 11, 1923, the historical date for our profession, in the presence of Prof. Zahari Karaouglanov - Rector of the Sofia University, the first regular Faculty Council consisting of the first three regularly elected professors (Prof. Stefan Angelov, Assoc. prof. Grozyo Dikov and Assoc. prof. Stanko Petrov) was convened. The first Dean - Prof. Stefan Angelov, was elected and from this day on, the youngest faculty became an integral part of the university life. The date May 11, 1923 is accepted as initial in the FVM chronology.

The further pathway of the FVM is determined by the social economic development of the country and notably, with the related establishment of the veterinary medical system on one part and the progress in veterinary science on the other. As a result of these social influences, the development of the FVM could be divided into six historical periods.

=== In the Sofia University (1923-1948) ===
The first professors are graduates of the higher veterinary schools in Berlin, Vienna, Lyon and Torino. International contests for heads of three major departments were announced. Thus, Assoc. Prof. Heinrich Bitner from Berlin was appointed for head of the Department of Anatomy, Histology and Embryology, Prof. Johannes Nörr from Leipzig became head of the Department of General Therapy, Pharmacology and Toxicology, and Prof. Kurt Krause from Berlin - head of the Department of General Pathology and Pathoanatomy. These professors introduced in Bulgaria the academic programmes and curricula of renowned European higher veterinary education establishments. The joint efforts of German and Bulgarian educators, having graduated abroad, provide an explanation of the successful start of the Faculty of Veterinary Medicine. The period when the FVM was within the structure of the Sofia University, was a period of strengthening and affirmation of European higher education system. The organization of departments as primary units of tuition and research began as early as the first days of FVM's existence.

The first courses started in the spring semester of the academic year 1923–1924 with 33 students and they took place in the Bacteriological Station and the Military Veterinary Hospital. The number of students, enrolled in the years that followed, was about 30. The first curriculum was approved by the Faculty Council on January 12, 1924, and consisted of 40 courses with specific number of theoretical and practical hours per semester.

A research fund was created, that was the main prerequisite for rapid and quality advancement of science for years. This fund allowed also the regular publication of the Faculty's Annual. The first issue was published in 1924–1925, and afterwards, one volume was annually issued. In this annual, the results of the research of the academic staff of the FVM were published in Bulgarian, with summary in a foreign language. The scientific results of faculty professors became known in the other countries, as the edition was distributed in almost all European scientific centres through the university library.

The commencement ceremony of the first class took place on July 1, 1928, in the Big University Auditorium. Twenty four veterinarians, including one woman, received their graduation diplomas.

The FVM founders thought about the material base as a primary precondition for effective tuition and research development. In the period 1930–1938, the faculty premises and clinics were built on 740 decares of land, on the left of Tsarigradsko Shosse in Sofia, provided by the Evlogi and Hristo Georgievi Eforia. The construction works were funded by the National Veterinary Service by transfer of resources from the funds “Epizooties” and “Veterinary therapeutic services”. Thus, the youngest faculty of the Sofia University obtained an own material base before the other faculties did. This success was the result of the professional unanimous actions of the Veterinary section to the Ministry of Agriculture and State Property, and the newly founded faculty.

Another eminent figure from this period is Prof. Georgi Pavlov. He graduated in Torino, Italy, and was a fellow citizen of Prof. Stefan Angelov (both born in Kotel).

For many years, Prof. Pavlov marked the development of veterinary medicine in Bulgaria, being the founder of the public veterinary medicine. After his death, the FVM accepted him as a patron and this decision of the Faculty Council was approved by an Order No 8866 of December 30, 1947 of the Minister of Education. In this period, Deans were elected on an annual basis. The functions of the dean were executed as follows: 7 years by Prof. Stefan Angelov, 5 years by Prof. Grozyo Dikov, 4 years by Prof. Georgi Pavlov, 2 years by Prof. Stanko Petrov, 2 years by Prof. Ignat Emanouilov and 1 year by each of Prof. Petar Bichev, Prof. Panayot Popov, Prof. Mosko Moskov, Prof. Boyan Nachev, Prof. Assen Petkov and Prof. Ksenofont Ivanov.

=== In the Georgi Dimitrov Agricultural Academy (1948-1953) ===
By a Decree No 6 of the Council of Ministers from September 17, 1948, the Agricultural Academy was created in Sofia. It consisted of four faculties, 3 of them taken away from the Sofia University structure (Faculty of Veterinary Medicine, Faculty of Agronomy, Faculty of Forestry) and the newly created Faculty of Zootechnics (1947). This reorganization corresponded to the restructuring of Bulgarian higher education. It was performed on the basis of the Higher Education Act, accepted in September 1948. The changes were managed by Prof. Ksenofont Ivanov, Rector of the Agricultural Academy and Prof. Ignat Emanouilov, Dean of FVM (later, they became academicians). The transformations consisted in a serious internal reform of educational units and alteration in the principal elements of the tuition - the curriculum and academic programmes in two directions: methodologically, according to Marxist–Leninist principles, and organizationally, on a planned basis.

=== Higher Institute of Veterinary Medicine (1953-1972) ===
Decree No 230 of June 10, 1953 of the National Assembly Presidium, divided the Agricultural Academy to several institutes, one of them being the Higher Institute of Veterinary Medicine (HIVM). In the beginning of its independent existence, the HIVM had 20 departments. During these years, the institute was supervised by the rectors: Prof. Mosko Moskov (1953–1958), Prof. Metodi Petrichev (1958–1962), Prof. Tsanko Zahariev (1962–1968) and Prof. Hristo Ganovski (1968–1972). The annual number of admitted students in the beginning of the period was about 200, and since the academic year 1963-1964 has increased to 240. The period 1962-1968 is also remarkable with increase in the enrollment of foreign students. At the same time, the academic staff was enlarged as well. In 1963-1964 the HIVM had a teaching staff of 108 people comprising: 2 academicians, 3 correspondent members, 16 full-time professors, 12 associate professors and 75 assistant professors and instructors.

The management of the HIVM has incessantly searched for the most appropriate mechanism for improving the organization of tuition. The efforts were directed to a better practical training of students. The changes in the academic programmes and the curriculum corresponded to the occurring changes in agriculture - concentration and specialization of livestock production, and also to the development of the prevention trend in veterinary medicine.

In 1960, a mobile clinic was created, administered by Assoc. Prof. Marin Hubenov. Some years later (1964–1965), the mobile clinic courses were relocated in the premise of the Military Hospital. In the beginning of 1969, the Ministry of Education created a Department of Specialization and Continuous Education of Veterinary Professionals. Its management is given to Prof. Onoufri Neychev. An Educational Methodical Council was elected that approved the programmes of qualification courses. During that period, the HIVM maintained its reputation as a renowned higher education establishment. Its distinction was determined by the quality of tuition from one hand, due to the unity of educational and research work in close relation to the needs of animal science, and to the international recognition of eminent professors and alumni, from the other. In the FAO classification of recommended higher veterinary medicine establishments in the world, the HIVM occupied the prestigious 14th position.

=== In the REPLA Association (1972-1974) ===
The Research and Education Livestock Production Association (RELPA) is an entirely new structure that existed for a very short time. Being an unified centre of research and education of veterinary and zootechny specialists, RELPA joined the Higher Institute of Veterinary Medicine “Prof. Georgi Pavlov”, the Faculty of Zootechnics of the Higher Agricultural Institute “Georgi Dimitrov”, the Veterinary Medical Institute of Infectious and Parasitic Diseases, the Institute of Biology and Pathology of Reproduction and Non-Infectious Diseases, and the Institute of Animal Sciences in Kostinbrod.

By that time, the Faculty of Veterinary Medicine is administered by Prof. Ivan Prandzhev and Prof. Onoufri Neychev. The requirement for uniform integrated higher education administration entailed further organizational changes in the faculty. The primary structural unit was the Department of Science and Education, composed of faculty departments and the respective sections and laboratories of the research institutes. Practically, transformation only of the form but not of the content was carried out. The integration has impaired drastically the traditional academic lifestyle.

=== In the Higher Institute of Zootechnics and Veterinary Medicine (1974-1995) ===
With a Decree No 65 of the Council of Ministers from May 7, 1974, a division of the Agricultural Academy was created in Stara Zagora under the name of Higher Institute of Zootechnics and Veterinary Medicine (HIZVM). This establishment comprised the two faculties of the Research and Education Livestock Production Association, i.e. the Faculty of Veterinary Medicine and the Faculty of Zootechnics.

The relocation of the FVM occurred during 1974-1979 and was managed by the Dean, Prof. Onoufri Neychev. A primary concern of the faculty managing team was the moving of departments and the creation of appropriate conditions for tuition and research. The structure of the FVM comprised 18 departments. Most of professors (about 75%) came from Sofia to Stara Zagora and this is considered the main reason for the successful transfer of academic traditions to the new site. In 1979 the relocation was over.

After 1979, the FVM was managed by the following deans, one after the other: Prof. Tsenko Gigov (1979–1983), Prof. Ivan Prandzhev (1983–1987), Prof. Vassil Ivanov (1987–1989), Prof. Lyubomir Dyakov (1989–1993) and Prof. Chavdar Popov (1993–1995). The efforts of the first three deans were focused in two primary issues:

1. Groundwork and building of the material base of the FVM. In 1979, the new construction works have begun. The financing came from the central funds of the Ministry of Agriculture and the state budget. In the summer of 1986, the FVM started the gradual relocation in the new faculty complex.

2. Introduction of a three-stage system of higher veterinary medical education: first stage - fundamental and general theoretical education; second stage - specialized training and third stage - special clinical training. With the third stage, five specialized profiles of veterinary professionals were approved: general therapy and prevention; veterinary sanitary expertise and food control, ruminant pathology, swine pathology and avian pathology.

=== In the Trakia University (1995) ===
On 21 July 1995, with a decision of the 37th National Assembly, the Trakia University in Stara Zagora was opened. Decree No 62 of the Council of Ministers determined the structure of the university and the status of the FVM as a juridical person. Since then, the FVM was headed by the deans Prof. Lambo Georgiev (1996–1999), Assoc. Prof. Kiril Vassilev (2000–2003) and Prof. Yordan Nikolov (2004–2007). This period of the faculty pathway is related to the accreditation of the veterinary medicine major in 1997, and this was the first accredited specialty in the Republic of Bulgaria.

For 88 years, the FVM has trained about 12,000 veterinary professionals in order to overcome the existing deficit. The gained international appreciation of the Faculty of Veterinary Medicine as a renowned higher education establishment, motivated many countries to send their citizens for obtaining a degree in veterinary medicine in Bulgaria after the academic year 1947–1948. About 400 foreign citizens from 46 countries graduated from the FVM and another 60 had finished their PhD studies here.

The FVM is the place of birth of almost all directions of Bulgarian veterinary science. The genesis and the first generation of scientists of two eminent Bulgarian scientific schools are linked to the faculty: the microbiological school of academician Stefan Angelov and the pathomorphological one of academician Ksenofont Ivanov. In the 1950s, their leaders went to the Bulgarian Academy of Sciences and there, founded scientific institutes and educated the second generations of scientists.

== Structure ==
The Faculty of Veterinary Medicine consists of 9 departments and a clinical diagnostic unit

=== Departments ===
1) Department of Veterinary Anatomy, Histology and Embryology 2) Department of Pharmacology, Animal Physiology and Physiological Chemistry 3) Department of General and Clinical Pathology 4) Department of Animal Husbandry 5) Department of Veterinary Microbiology, Infectious and Parasitic Diseases 6) Department of Veterinary Surgery 7) Department of Obstetrics, Reproduction and Reproductive Disorders 8) Department of Internal Non-infectious Diseases 9) Department of Animal Food Hygiene and Control, Veterinary Legislation and Management

=== Clinical Diagnostic Unit ===
The clinical diagnostic unit has a primary role in the practical training of students. It consists of: 1) Laboratory Diagnostic Centre with 10 laboratories. 2) Small Animal Clinic 3) Productive Animal Clinic 4) Equine Clinic

== EAEVE status ==
After the ECOVE meeting held in June 2022, the Faculty has acquired the status "APPROVAL".
