= Danny Levan =

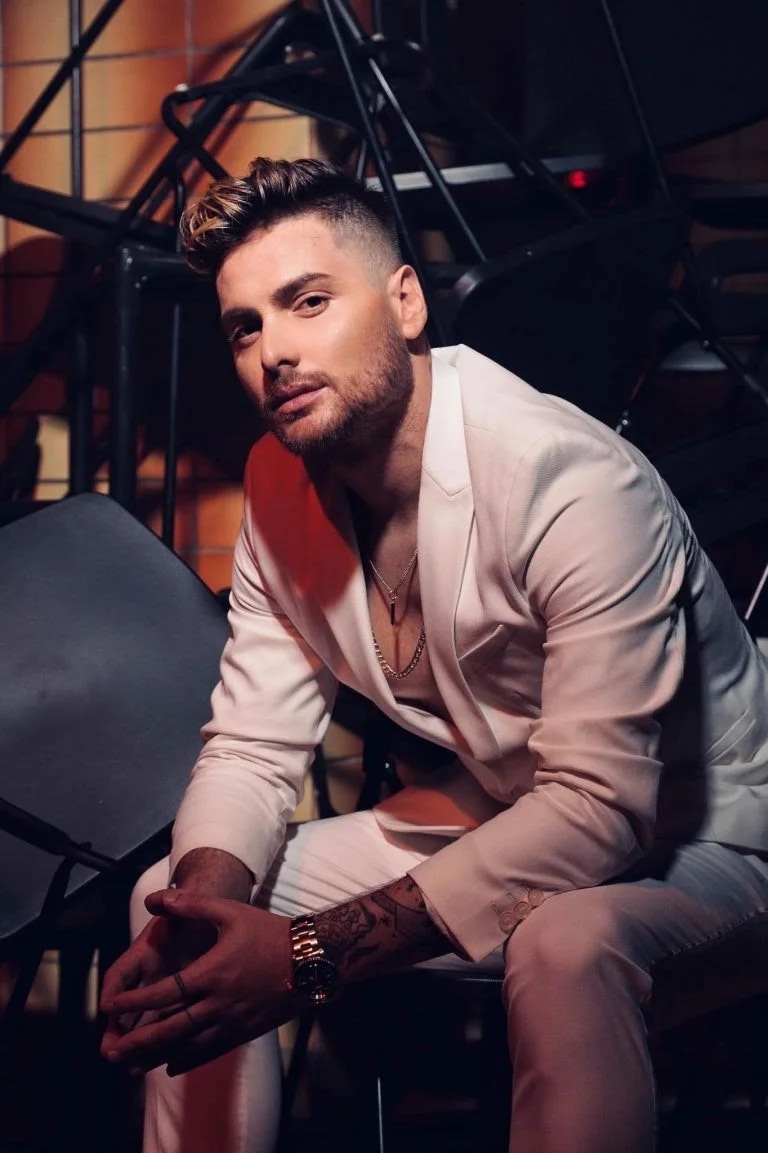

Background information
- Born: Daniel Rusev; 24 April 1990 (age 36); Burgas, Bulgaria
- Genres: Pop, Dance-pop, Urban pop Dance, House music
- Instrument: Vocals
- Years active: 2008–present
- Labels: Universal Music Group, Minos EMI, King Street Records, Crossworld Records
- Website: www.dannylevan.com

Danny Levan (Bulgarian: Дани Левън), is a pop, dance and house music singer and songwriter born in Bulgaria in the city of Burgas as Daniel Dimitrov Rusev (Bulgarian: Даниел Димитров Русев) with Greek roots from his mother's side. Realized many projects in Bulgaria and around the world.

== Musical career ==
Levan began his career using his birth name. Afterwards, he changed his name to the stage name "Danny Levan." In 2008, he released his first song, "Something New" (Bulgarian: Нещо ново).

In the same year, he released the songs "Can We," "Pink Days," and "I Want from You" (a duet with another singer, Leo, from the reality show Big Brother).

In 2009, with the composer Martin Biolchev, Levan made the song "Infuse Me" (Bulgarian: Влей се в мен, literally Pour yourself into me). "Infuse Me" was aired live on the nationwide TV channel bTV on the comedy show "The Comedians." At the end of 2009, he shot two videos, for the songs "Something New" and "Infuse Me," with him as director, which officially went online in 2010. Many concerts and television and radio appearances followed. However, from 2011 to 2013, he paused his musical career. In October 2011, because of an invitation from the leader of the Bulgarian party "SEK," Danny Levan became a candidate for Burgas municipal elections counselor for 2011.

At the same time, from 2011 to 2013, he was sent several contracts for Bulgarian and foreign musical companies and labels, but did not accept any of them.

In 2013, he created a self-written song, "Body Shaker" with Bate Pesho, which was nominated for the first musical awards from BOX TV, the national musical television. The video to the song was filmed by Bashmotion and went live during August of the same year.

In 2014, DJ Diass wrote a song for Danny entitled "Losing track of time", which is released by "Crossworld Records" London around the world.

A month later, again with his lyrics, together with DJ Gabriel Slick, he created the album "Patterns", which includes 5 songs and 2 remixes. The album is released worldwide again under the auspices of the English label from London "Crossworld Records". The song "Patterns" is a single from the album. In Bulgaria, 7 weeks are held in first place in the ranking of the top 40 of "Alpha Radio".

Alpha Radio's single "Patterns" became the most broadcast song of 2014, according to the radio station.

At the same time, Levan created a new EP with music producers The Moochers from Italy. The album is titled "Scars of Love" (in Bulgarian: Белези от любов), containing 3 songs and 1 remix, again after the lyrics of the artist.

Scars of Love is released by King Street Records – a label from New York City.

The single "Chance for Love" to the music of Svetlin Kaslev – Starlight was released on 14 February 2014 in a duet with Nells. The video for the song is the work of the director Alexander Molov.

During this period he received an inquiry from the Greek singer Marina Sazi for a cover of his song "Body Shaker".

Subsequently, the singer's team invited him to make the song in a duet. In May of that year, they shot a video for "Body Shaker" together. The song and video are distributed by Universal Music Group directly in Vevo and in over 25 countries around the world.

He received a contract offer from Universal Music Group – Minos EMI, which he accepted and in June 2014 signed a contract with the music company.

On 1 December 2014 was released Danny Levan's first solo single "Don't Say Goodbye" with the music giant Universal Music Group – Minos EMI. The video was uploaded by the music giant with its premiere at VEVO after three months of work on the project. The song climbed to No. 1 in the top 40, Spain, for several weeks in a row.

On 10 December 2014, Danny Levan received the "Pop Artist of the Year" award at the fifth annual media awards for fashion, style and show business – Varna.

On 7 June 2016 he presents his duet song with the pop-folk singer Anelia – "In my mind". The video was shot in the Turkish resort of Alanya. The director of the video is Pavlin Ivanov. The duo is released by the music company Payner.

On 15 May 2018, the video for the single "Let's do it" is released. The song is based on music by Daniel Ganev and lyrics by Danny Levan. The video was recorded in the singer's hometown – Burgas. The video is released by the music label Facing The Sun.

Hook Music – Greece releases the single Love me on replay on 1 December 2018.

On 25 April 2020 the video for the single "There's More"is released. The song is based on music by Kaloyan 'Stanx' Stanev from OnTheBeat Production and Danny Levan. The text is by Danny Levan. The video was shot in Utopia Forest, Burgas.

On 30 July 2020, the video for the single "Are Begay" is released. The song is based on music by Kaloyan 'Stanx' Stanev from OnTheBeat Production and Danny Levan. The text is by Danny Levan. The video was shot at Camping Lausanne, Aheloy with the participation of gymnast Jenina Stefanova.

A month and a half after the realization of the single "Are Begai" on 14 October 2020 Danny Levan surprised his fans with a new single and video entitled "Is that you". The song has a modern dance house sound. The music is by Hrisi Pachalova and Kiril Dimitrov, the lyrics are by Angel Prodanov and Hrisi Pachalova, and the arrangement is by Pancho Karamanski. The director of the video is Pavlin Ivanov – Bashmotion, for which the sports complex of the Technical University in Sofia was used as a filming site. The video also features dancers from "NEXT Generation" with choreographer Rositsa Terziyska.

On 27 October 2021, Danny Levan's single "DANCE" was officially released on the music streaming platforms. Although the song is titled "Dance" the lyrics are in Bulgarian. The team in the making of the song is about the same as the single "Is that you". The new team member is Anastasia Mavrodieva - songwriter.

On 22 February 2023, Danny Levan's latest single "Как си" (in English: How are you?) and his official video was officially released on the music streaming platforms. The music and the arrangement are by Ivan Tishev, the lyrics are by Anastasia Mavrodieva. The director of the video is Pavlin Ivanov – Bashmotion.

On 20 October 2023, Danny Levan and Christiana Loizu released their first duet song in Greek, "Vradia Hamena" (in English: Lost Nights). The song has a dance sound, and the video was shot in the emblematic House of culture"Grozarde". The music and arrangement are by Desislav Danchev - Deso, the lyrics are by the Greek poet Iliana Exaras, and the video and audio producers are the performers themselves.

On 7 June 2024, Danny Levan and Christiana Loizu released a new version of their first duet song in Greek, "Vradia Hamena" (in English: Lost Nights). The name of the song is "Крий ми очите" (in English: Hide my eyes). The song has a dance sound, and the video was shot in the emblematic House of culture"Grozarde". The music and arrangement are by Desislav Danchev - Deso, the lyrics are by Anastasia Mavrodieva, and the video and audio producers are the performers themselves.

On 13.02.2025 is the premiere of Danny Levan's latest single - "The Most Expensive". The song is pop of the highest quality, with a great classic disco beat, catchy lyrics and a great video.The musical line created by Angel Prodanov – Acho, the text is by Danny Levan, and the arrangement by Angel Prodanov - Acho and Danny Levan. Unpretentious but imaginative, the video reveals the exciting and multi-layered image of love. The main character in the footage is Danny Levan himself, who perfectly plays the role of a man who has experienced the loneliness and madness of a toxic relationship.

== Videos ==
- Danny Levan – Something New (in Bulgarian – Нещо ново / Neshto novo) – 2010
- Danny Levan – Infuse Me (in Bulgarian – Влей се в мен / Vley se v men) -2010
- Danny Levan – Body Shaker – 1 July 2013
- Danny Levan ft. Starlight – Overheating (in Bulgarian – Прегрявам / Pregryavam) – December 2013
- Danny Levan ft. Nells – A chance for love (in Bulgarian – Шанс на любовта / Shans na lyubovta)- 14 February 2014
- Sazi & Danny Levan – Body Shaker – in May 2014:
- Gabriel Slick ft. Danny Levan – Patterns – 22 February 2014
- Danny Levan – Don`t say goodbye – in 1 December 2014:
- Danny Levan – Rapture – 12 July 2015
- Danny Levan & Анелия – В моя ум – 7 June 2016
- Danny Levan – Нека го направим (in English – Let's Do it) – 15 August 2018
- Danny Levan – Love me on replay – 1 November 2018
- Danny Levan & Bobby – Гранатомета – 29 May 2019
- Danny Levan – Има още (in English – There's more) – 25 April 2020
- Danny Levan – Аре бегай – 30 July 2020
- Danny Levan – Ти ли си (in English – Is that you) – 14 October 2020
- Danny Levan – Dance – 28 April 2022
- Danny Levan – Как си (in English – How are you?) – 22 February 2023
- Danny Levan & Christiana Loizu - Vradia Hamena (in English - Lost Nights) - 20.10.2023
- Danny Levan & Christiana Loizu - Крий ми очите (in English - Hide my eyes) - 07.06.2024
- Danny Levan - Най-скъпото(in English - The most expensive) - 13.02.2025

== Single ==
Title	Music	Arranged	Lyrics	Label	Date
Нещо ново	Andre/Danny Levan	Andre	Danny Levan	Danny Levan	2010
Влей се в мен	Martin Biolchev	Martin Biolchev	Danny Levan	Danny Levan	2010
After Midnight	Plamen Stoychev	Plamen Stoychev	Faviol Seferi	Danny Levan	2012
Body Shaker	Danny Levan/Bate pesho	Danny Levan/Bate pesho	Danny Levan	Danny Levan	декември 2013
Прегрявам	Svetlin Kuslev aka Starlight	Svetlin Kuslev aka Starlight	Danny Levan	Danny Levan	1 August 2013
Шанс за любовта / What if	Svetlin Kuslev aka Starlight	Svetlin Kuslev aka Starlight	Nells and Danny Levan	Nells	10 February 2014
Patterns	Gabriel Slick and Danny Levan	Gabriel Slick	Danny Levan	Crossworld Records	2014
Dirty nights	Danny Levan/Ivan Seagal	Ivan Seagal	Danny Levan	℗ Big Mamas House Records	1 August 2014
On Fire	Svetlin Kuslev aka Starlight	Svetlin Kuslev aka Starlight	Rachel Row	Universal music – EMI	6 August 2014
Don't Say Goodbye	Martin Biolchev	Martin Biolchev	Rachel Row	Universal music – EMI	30 November 2014
Rapture	Martin Biolchev	Martin Biolchev	Rachel Row	Universal Music Group	7 July 2015
В моя ум	Martin Biolchev	Martin Biolchev	Yordan Botev	Payner Music Ltd.	7 June 2016
Нека го направим	Daniel Ganev	Daniel Ganev	Danny Levan	Facing The Sun	15 May 2018
Има още	Kaloian 'Stanx' Станев OnTheBeat Production, Danny Levan	Kaloian 'Stanx' Станев OnTheBeat Production	Danny Levan	Danny Levan	25 April 2020
Аре бегай	Kaloian 'Stanx' Станев OnTheBeat Production, Danny Levan	Kaloian 'Stanx' Станев OnTheBeat Production	Danny Levan	Danny Levan	30 July 2020
Ти ли си	Hrisi Pachalova – Hrissie and Kiril Dimitrov – Kiko	Pancho Karamanski	Angel Prodanov – Acho and Hrisi Pachalova – Hrissie	Danny Levan	14 October 2020
DANCE	Angel Prodanov, Danny Levan	Angel Prodanov, Danny Levan	Danny Levan and Anastasia Mavrodieva	Danny Levan	27 October 2021
Как си	Ivan Tishev	Ivan Tishev	Anastasia Mavrodieva	Danny Levan	22 February 2023
Vradia Hamena	Desislav Danchev - Deso	Desislav Danchev - Deso	Ileana Exaras	KVZ Music Ltd.	20 October 2023
Крий ми очите	Desislav Danchev - Deso	Desislav Danchev - Deso	Anastasia Mavrodieva	KVZ Music Ltd.	7 June 2024
Най-скъпото	Angel Prodanov - Acho	Angel Prodanov - Acho, Danny Levan	Danny Levan	KVZ Music Ltd.	13 February 2025

== Album ==
Влей се в мен/ Vley se v men – Infuse Me BG 2011

Title	Music	Arrangement	Lyric
Влей се в мен	Мартин Биолчев	Мартин Биолчев	Danny Levan
Влей се в мен (Gion REMIX)	Мартин Биолчев	Мартин Биолчев/Dj Gion	Danny Levan
Нещо ново (Original Mix)	Андре, Danny Levan	Андре	Danny Levan
Нещо ново (Club Mix)	Андре, Danny Levan	Радо Иванов	Danny Levan
I know how	Dj Stinki, Danny Levan	Dj Stinki	Danny Levan

PATTERNS 2014

Title	Music	Arrangement	Lyric
Feeling Deep	Gabriel Slick and Danny Levan	Gabriel Slick	Danny Levan
Next Day	Gabriel Slick and Danny Levan	Gabriel Slick	Danny Levan
Patterns	Gabriel Slick and Danny Levan	Gabriel Slick	Danny Levan
Something for tonight	Gabriel Slick and Danny Levan	Gabriel Slick	Danny Levan
Sunday	Gabriel Slick and Danny Levan	Gabriel Slick	Danny Levan

SCARS OF LOVE 2014

Title	Music	Arrangement	Lyric
Loser Number One	The Moochers / Danny Levan	The Moochers	Danny Levan
Scars Of Love	The Moochers / Danny Levan	The Moochers	Danny Levan
Time For Second Chance	The Moochers / Danny Levan	The Moochers	Danny Levan

== Sources ==
- Mika magazine
- Fame
- Hot News
- Fame
- Novini
- Tv7
- Bulgaria Now
- Radio NJOY
- Like a lady
- Hit Channel – GREECE
- Hit Channel – GREECE
