= Svetlina AD =

Bulgarian lighting manufacturing plants

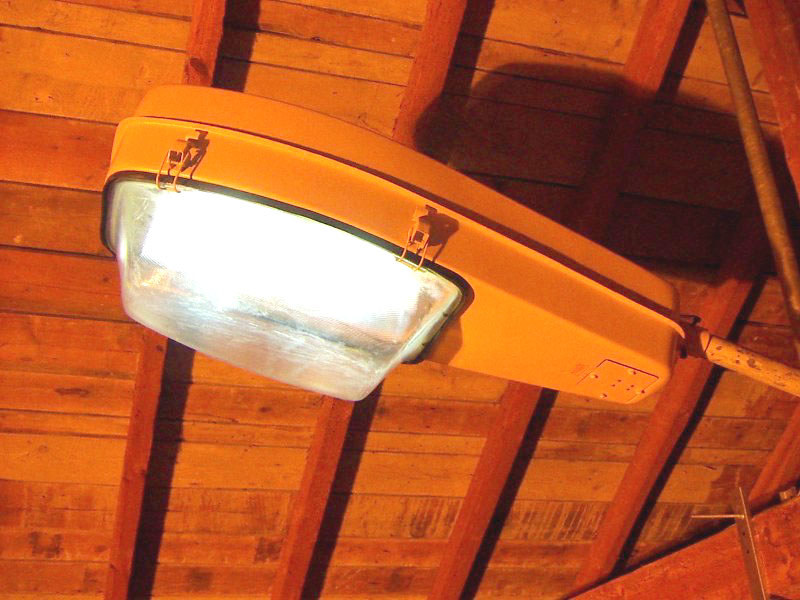
A street lamp from the plant in Stara Zagora (in a show room)

"Svetlina" AD (Bulgarian: „Светлина“ АД), or more commonly only Svetlina, is the name of 2 Bulgarian lighting manufacturing plants. The word svetlina (светлина) means "light", while AD is an abbreviation of aktsionerno druzhestvo (акционерно дружество) - the Bulgarian type of joint-stock company.

== "Svetlina" AD, Sliven ==
Located in the city of Sliven, this plant produces mainly lamps, lanterns and light bulbs intended for indoor and home use. However, the electrical components and bulbs for the street lamps, produced by the other plant of Svetlina in Stara Zagora, are also produced there. "Svetlina" Sliven is a successor of the first factory for production of electrical lamps in Bulgaria and on the Balkan peninsula. The beginning is laid during 1934 with incandescent lamps for general lighting service. Later on during 1957 begins the production of fluorescent lamps; during 1962 - of automobile lamps; during 1973 - of halogen lamps; during 1977 - of mercury lamps with high pressure. Quartz glass with high purity is produced from 1977.

== "Svetlina" AD, Stara Zagora ==
Founded in 1949 in the city of Stara Zagora, this plant produces vehicle lamps, ship projectors and many more. It also produces a variety of street lams, the most popular models of which are 36.9.900.094, 36.2.900.101 and 36.2.900.103. An interesting fact is that these lamp models survived for two decades before being replaced with newer, but (as reported by independent specialists in the field of lighting) inferior street lamps, produced by Hit Lighting - Bulgaria. Svetlina's lanterns are bigger and heavier than the Hit Lighting ones. However, they also have bigger refractors, thus spreading light more efficiently. In addition they have an original design, whether the lanterns of Hit Lighting look very similar to the current lanterns of other manufacturers, e.g. General Electric and Technosvet. Svetlina luminaries stayed almost the same in the outside (because their design is considered both standard and aesthetic, while in the same time not being obsolete), but constantly changed in the inside. They were also exported to many countries, particularly to USSR, Russia and Germany. Highly neglected from 2001 to 2006, these lanterns are currently regaining their popularity from the past. As of Early 2008, there aren't any sources available on whether or not these lamp models are still produced.

== See also ==
- Street light
- Stara Zagora
- Sliven
