= Poglednij me v otchite =

Pogledni me v otchite

Studio album by Anelia
- Released: December 2002
- Recorded: August–November 2002
- Genre: Pop-folk, chalga
- Label: Payner Music

Singles from Pogledni me v otchite
- 1. "Pogledni me v otchite" 2. "Samo mene niamash" 3. "Chuzdni Ustni"

Pogledni me v otchite (Bulgarian: Погледни ме в очите; English: Look into my eyes) is the first studio album by the Bulgarian pop-folk singer Anelia. The album sold over 100,000 copies in Bulgaria, the best-selling album in the country for 2003, and produced three consecutive number-one hits. It features her breakthrough single, "Pogledni me v otchite", Anelia's first to top the Bulgarian charts. Other singles released from the album include "Samo mene niamash" (which also peaked at number one) and "Chuzdni ustni". The remix of the lead single topped the chart after the original song.

== Track listing ==
1. Погледни ме в очите (Remix) 4:51
2. Само тази нощ 3:11
3. Лед и огън 5:14
4. Не ме лъжи 4:11
5. Прости 3:56
6. Само мене нямаш 3:36
7. Без теб 3:36
8. Чужди устни 3:44
9. Сама 3:58
10. Не искай 3:48
11. Погледни ме в очите 4:11

== Charts ==
=== Weekly charts ===
Chart (2003)	Peak position
Bulgaria	1

=== Year-end charts ===
Chart (2003)	Rank
Bulgaria	1
