= Stefan Slivkov =

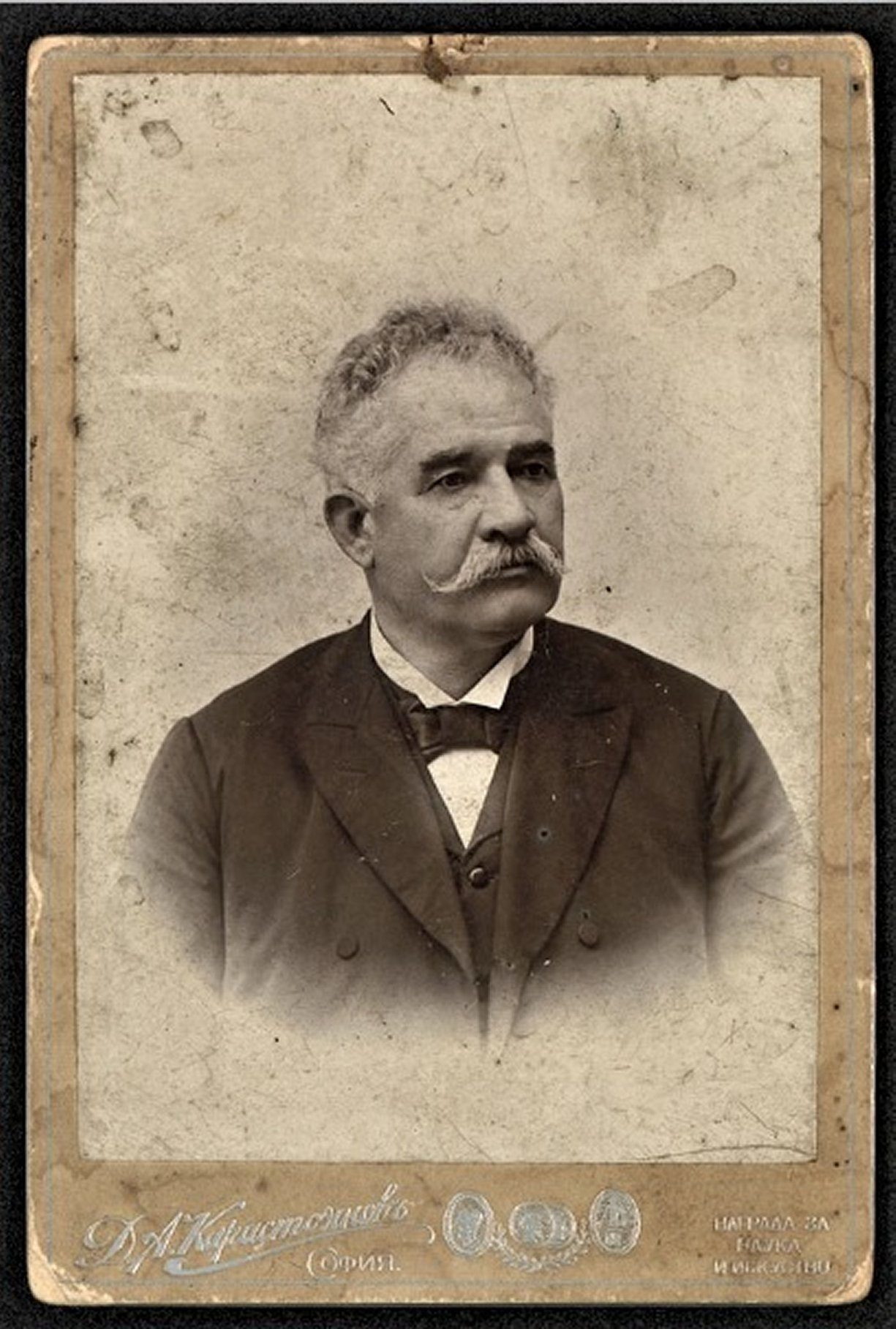
Stefan Slivkov

Stefan Slivkov (Bulgarian: Стефан Сливков; 1837–1917) was a Bulgarian revolutionary and politician, an associate of national hero Vasil Levski, and one of the founders of the local revolutionary committee in Stara Zagora. Slivkov fought for the liberation of Bulgaria from the Ottoman Empire. He was captured and exiled in the notorious Diyarbakır Prison in 1873. During his captivity, Slivkov endured torture and humiliation. He was released in 1878, following the Treaty of San Stefano.

Slivkov returned home to become a dedicated builder of the newly freed Eastern Rumelia. He was one of the key figures of the Bulgarian unification. Subsequently, he was elected mayor of Stara Zagora (March 1885 – March 1886), Deputy Mayor, member of the County Council for many years, and ultimately became a Bulgarian National Assemblyman representing the People's Party of Bulgaria.

== Legacy ==
Slivkov is remembered with great affection in Stara Zagora. Grateful citizens erected multiple statues and monuments; schools and streets are also named in his honor.
