= Stara Zagora =

Stara Zagora Стара Загора
- City
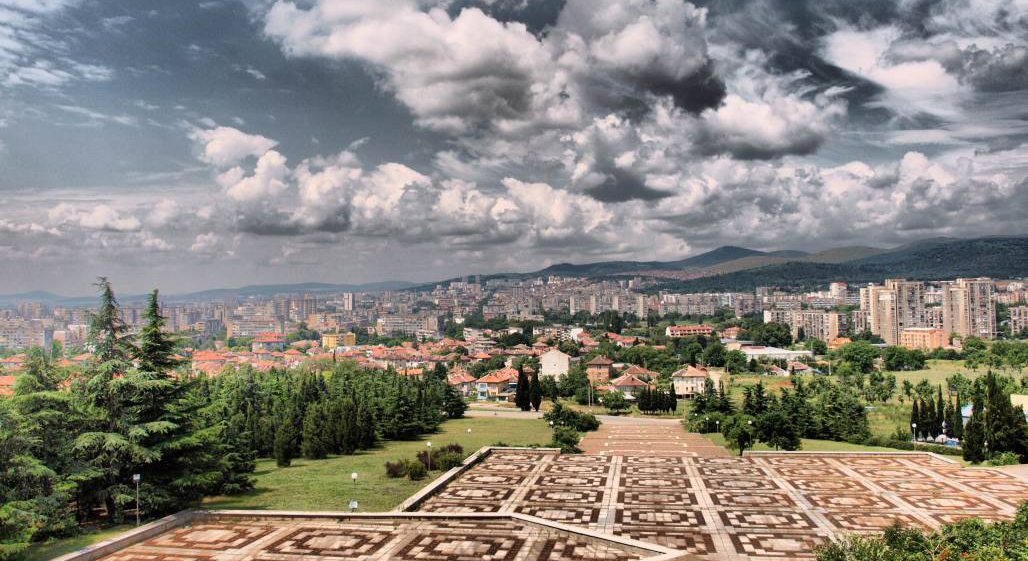
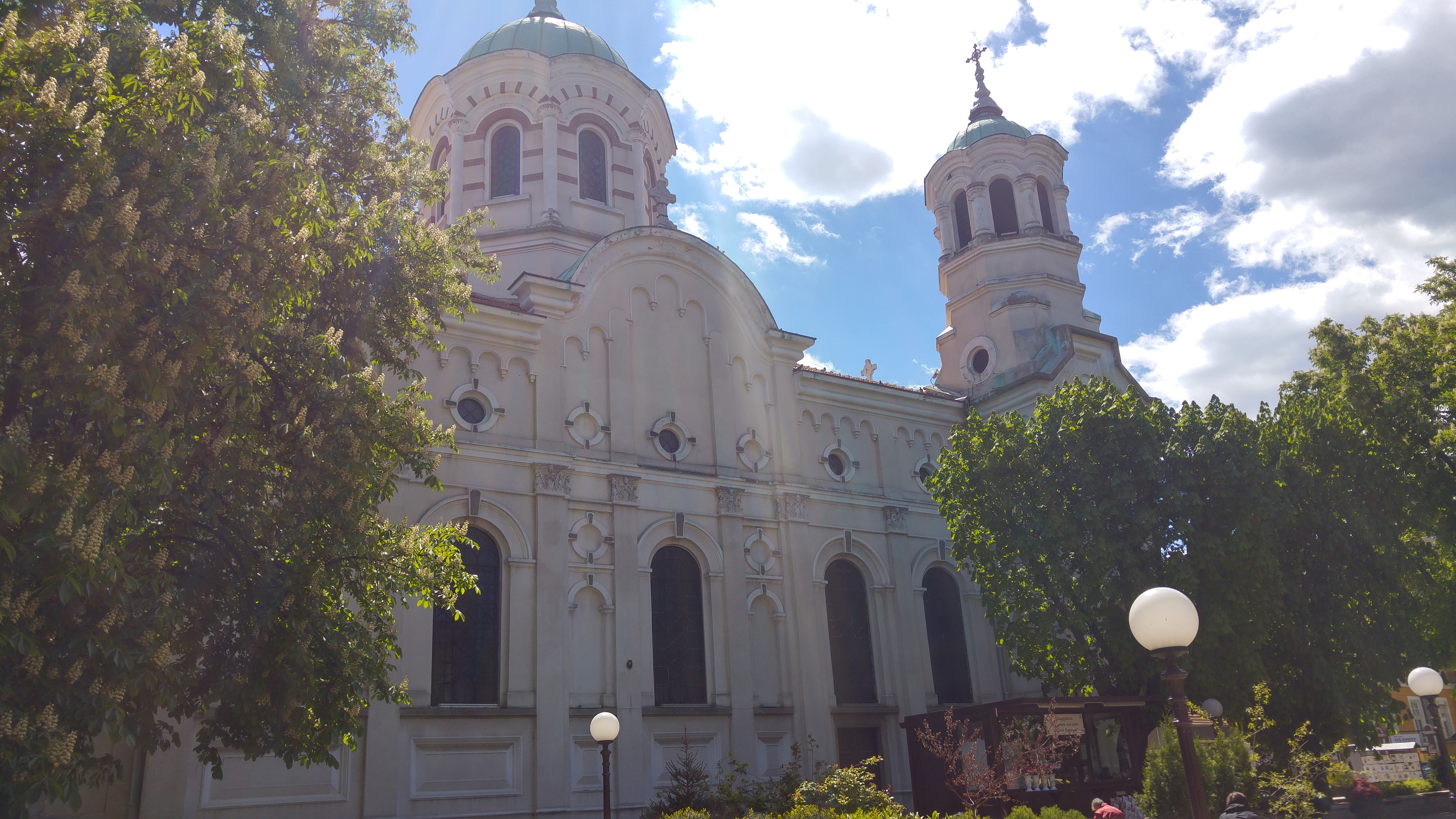
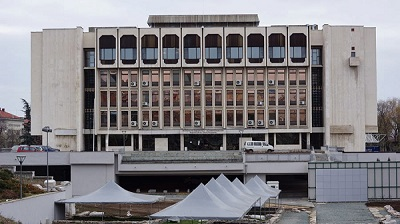
- From the top, view of the city from the monument "The Defenders of Stara Zagora", below left: Sveti Nikolay Chudotvorets church, below right: Zahariy Knyazheski library

- Flag Coat of arms

- Location within Bulgaria Location within Balkans
- Coordinates: 42°25′32″N 25°38′04″E
- Country: Bulgaria
- Province: Stara Zagora
- Established: 342 BC

Government
  - Mayor: Zhivko Todorov (GERB)
- Elevation: 196 m (643 ft)

Population (2024)
  - City: 121,582
  - Urban: 142,746
- Time zone: UTC+2 (EET)
  - Summer (DST): UTC+3 (EEST)
- Postal Code: 6000
- Area code: 042
- Website: www.starazagora.bg

Stara Zagora (Bulgarian: Стара Загора, pronounced [ˈstarɐ zɐˈɡɔrɐ]) is a city in Bulgaria, and the administrative capital of Stara Zagora Province. It is located in the Upper Thracian Plain, near the cities of Kazanlak, Plovdiv, and Sliven. Its population is 121,582 making it the fifth largest city of Bulgaria.

The city has had different names previously, including Beroe, Borui, Irenepolis, Eski Zagra, Augusta Traiana, etc. The earliest traces of civilisation date back to the 7th millennium BC. Some scholars believe that the ancient Thracian city of Beroe was located on the present site of Stara Zagora. In 1968, Neolithic dwellings from the mid-6th millennium BC were discovered in the town, which are the best preserved and richest collection in Europe of its kind and have been turned into a museum.

A high density of Neolithic and Chalcolithic settlements has been identified by researchers and a ritual structure nearly 8,000 years old has also been discovered. The first copper factory in Europe and a large ore mining centre were discovered, both over 7,000 years old. The original settlement dates from the 5th-4th century B.C under the name Beroe or Beroia, founded by Philip II of Macedon. It was renamed to Ulpia Augusta Traiana during Roman rule and became the most important city, above Philippopolis. During Marcus Aurelius' rule, many buildings have been built, art and music developed and there were statues and inscriptions of Orpheus.

The Goths defeated the Romans in the Battle of Beroe in 250 AD. During the Gothic War between 376 and 382, the Roman general Frigeridus promptly withdrew from Beroe to Illyria. At the end of the 6th century, Beroe was destroyed, but rebuilt under the name Veroia.

During the Middle Ages, Zagore is mentioned for the first time by Byzantine historians. Irene of Athens visited the town, rebuilding it and renaming it to Irenepolis, in honour of her. By the end of the 10th century, the city was in Bulgarian hands and acquired a fully Bulgarian character. Bulgarians called the town Borui (a modified form of the Thracian Beroe).

In 1371, the city passed to Ottoman Empire, but its earliest mention was in an Ottoman document from 1430. Plagues rampaged in the 18th-19th century, as well as famine and drought, livestock pestilence, and hailstorms destroyed all crops. During the Russo-Turkish War of 1877-1878, the town had devastating moments, which included a massacre of the local Bulgarians, in which thousands of people lost their lives, young women and girls being sold in the slave market of the Ottoman Empire.

In modern times, the city is relieved, as a growing city. The economy is developing like major cities in Bulgaria, with one of the highest wages in the country, high GDP in comparison with many Bulgarian cities, low unemployment of about 4%. The city is also located near the largest energy industrial complex, Maritsa Iztok Complex, where many of the people from Stara Zagora are employed.

== Name ==
The name comes from the Slavic root star ("old") and the name of the medieval region of Zagore ("beyond the Balkan mountains" in Slavic)

The original name was Beroe, which was changed to Ulpia Augusta Traiana by the Romans. From the 6th century the city was called Vereja and, from 784, Irenopolis (Greek: Ειρηνούπολις) in honour of the Byzantine empress Irene of Athens. In the Middle Ages it was called Boruj by the Bulgarians and later, Železnik. The Turks called it Eski Hisar (old fort) and Eski Zagra, from which its current name derives, assigned in 1871.

Beroe Hill on Livingston Island, West Antarctica, is named after this city, in its previous incarnation as Beroe.

== History ==
=== Neolithic Age ===
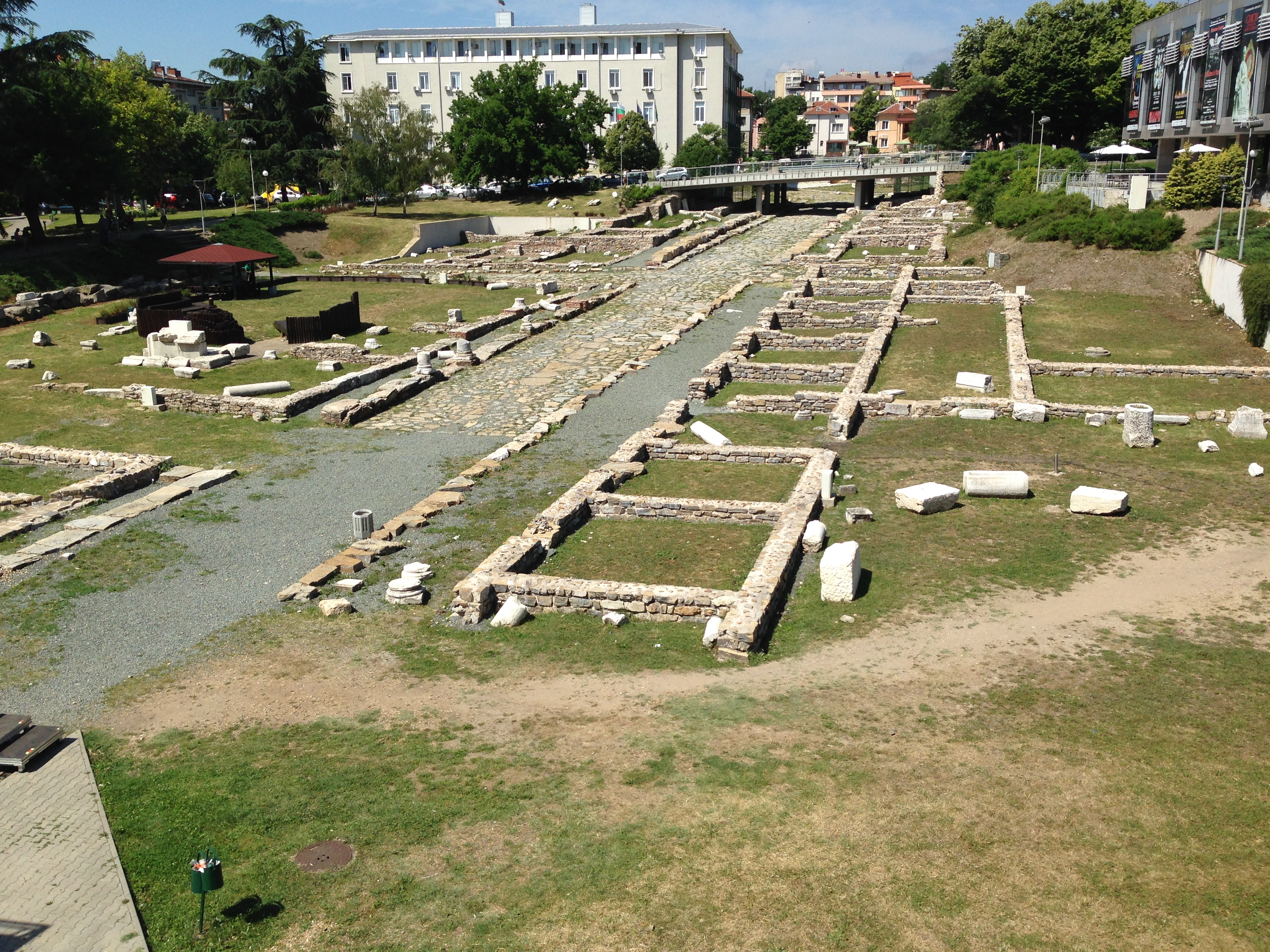
Main street of Augusta Traiana

The walls of Ulpia Augusta Traiana over a modern map

The earliest traces of civilisation in the region of Stara Zagora date back to the end of the 7th millennium B.C. Then, almost simultaneously, four prehistoric settlements emerged on the present territory of Stara Zagora and its surroundings, one of which was the largest in the Bulgarian lands for 6 thousand years. Some scholars believe that the ancient Thracian Beroe was located there.

In 1968, Neolithic dwellings from the mid-6th millennium BC were discovered in the town, which are the best preserved and richest collection in Europe and have been turned into a museum.

A high density of Neolithic and Chalcolithic settlements has been identified, with over 120 prehistoric settlements and 5 prehistoric settlement mounds, with numerous finds, one of them being the largest in Europe. Life here began in the late 7th millennium BC and continued until the 12th century AD.

Near Stara Zagora, a ritual structure nearly 8,000 years old has also been discovered.

During extensive excavations in the 1970s near Stara Zagora, the world's largest ore mining centre was also discovered in the 5th millennium BC. These metal mines, the oldest in Europe, are nearly 7,600 years old. In 2014, archaeologists from the Regional History Museum (Stara Zagora) discovered the first copper factory in Europe, over 7,000 years old.

The original Thracian settlement dates from the 5-4th century BC when it was called Beroe or Beroia.

The city was founded by Philip II of Macedon in 342 BC.

=== Antiquity ===
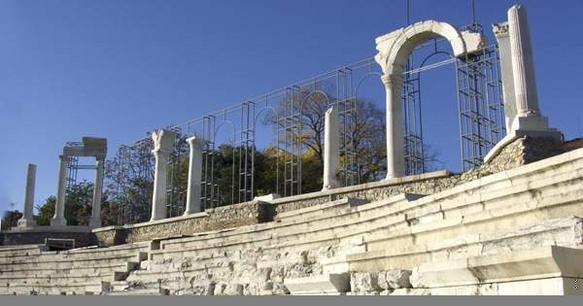
Auditorium of the Antique Forum

Under the Roman Empire, the city was renamed Ulpia Augusta Traiana in honour of emperor Trajan. The city grew to its largest extent under Marcus Aurelius (161-180) and became the most important city in the Roman province of Thrace. Its status and importance is evidenced by the visits of several emperors including Septimius Severus (193-211), Caracalla (211-217), and Diocletian (294-305). The city became the largest economic, administrative and cultural centre in the province. The famous Roman historian Ammianus Marcellinus wrote: "The great cities of Philippopolis and Augusta Traiana, which in antiquity were called Eumolpiada and Beroea, adorn the province of Thrace". The city has an independent municipal government, a city council and a people's assembly and enjoys a special status. By special order, it was in this city that the veterans of the wars fought by the Roman Empire settled. During the reign of Emperor Marcus Aurelius (161-180), straight streets, dozens of residential and public buildings, city walls enclosing an area of about 50 hectares and reinforced with about 40 towers, of which 11 have been excavated, water supply, sewerage, theatre building, temples, markets, odeon, thermae, forum were built in the city. A theatron with marble seats was also built, from which the spectacular gladiatorial battles, processions, celebrations, or assemblies where the important affairs of the city were decided, were observed. A gymnasium existed in the city, and sporting events were held in the stadium. The arts and musics developed in the city, as evidenced by the examples of bronze and stone sculpture, jewellery, pottery, glass objects, statues and inscriptions for Orpheus that have been found.

The Battle of Beroe was fought near the city in 250 resulting in a Gothic Victory. It was probably after this event that the city walls were doubled like other cities in the region (e.g. Diocletianopolis, Serdica).

In the 2nd-3rd century the city had its own coin mint showing its importance.

In 377, in the Gothic War (376-382), the Goths marched on Beroe to attack the Roman general Frigiderus but his scouts detected the invaders and he promptly withdrew to Illyria. The city was destroyed but rebuilt by Justinian. During the period of Late Antiquity (4th-6th centuries) the town was again named Beroe. The times are connected with the relocation of the capital of the empire from Rome to Constantinople, the accelerated Christianization of the local population, the Gothic invasions at the end of the 4th century and the devastating raids of the Huns in the middle of the 5th century.

In late antiquity, a mass Christianization of the local population began in Beroe, especially after the Medo-Latin Edict. The town was one of the most active centres of early Christianity. The first to introduce Christianity here was the apostle Carpus, one of the 70 apostles of Jesus Christ and a disciple of the apostle Paul. Beroe became the seat of a bishopric, which grew into an archbishopric. Bishop Demophilus of Beroe takes part in the Serdika Church Council. In 355, the Roman Pope Liberius was exiled to Beroe, and Demophilus went to Constantinople, where he reached the highest rank - Patriarch of the Byzantine Empire.

In the 6th century, the city is mentioned as Beroe in the Gothic calendar under the date 19 November, associated with the famous 40 female martyrs. At the end of the century, the town was again destroyed, but then rebuilt and took the name Vereia.

=== Middle Ages ===
For the first time the Zagore area is mentioned in the accounts of George Amartole, repeated by Symeon Logothete, George Kedrenos and Symeon the Metaphrast, where the help that Tervel's Bulgarian army gave to Emperor Justinian II in his restoration to the Constantinople throne is described. On this occasion, in 705, a peace treaty was signed between the Byzantine Empire and Bulgaria, according to which the Zagore region was ceded to Bulgaria. Three years later, according to other sources, Justinian II tried to regain the area, but was defeated near Anchialos. According to the later accounts of Theophanes the Confessor, in 716 a new treaty was concluded between the new emperor Theodosius III and Tervel, according to which, in addition to the area of Zagore finally ceded to the Bulgarians, another part of Thrace was ceded to the west of Zagore, as far as the "Mileon in Thrace". In 717. In 717 Tervel gave new aid to the empire with a large army and defeated the Umayyad Caliphate that had besieged Constantinople. After that, Beroe repeatedly passed now to Byzantium, now to Bulgaria. In 784 Beroe was in the possession of the Byzantine Empire and the empress Irene visited the town together with her son Constantine VI and a large retinue of courtiers. The empress rebuilt the town and called it Irenopolis - the city of Irena. The chronicler Theophanes the Confessor describes the visit of the empress to Beroe: "In that year, in the month of January, ind. seven, the said Stavracius returned from the land of the warehouses and on the hippodrome celebrated his victory with triumph. And in the month of May, of the same seventh Ind. the Empress Irene with her son and many troops went out into Thrace, bringing with her musical instruments, and came to Beroe. She ordered that this city should be built up, and renamed it Irenopolis."

John's Byzantine army, and many of the captives, were settled as foederati within the Byzantine frontier.

In 812 Irenopolis was Bulgarian again and was called Beroe after the victorious war of Krum in 812. Historical sources show that after the peace treaty of 817, the Bulgarian state took extensive measures to defend and fortify the area south of the Balkan Mountains from Beroe to the sea in order to annex it permanently to Bulgaria. By 850 - 860 Beroe was Bulgarian and the population was already majority Bulgarian by this time. For a few years the Byzantines took Zagore, but during the conversion of Knyaz Boris I in 864, the Zagora area and the town of Beroe were returned to Bulgaria. The chronicles about the return of the district also state its borders - from Sider (Zhelezni vrata, today Zmeyovski Pass) to Debelt. Within the borders of Bulgaria, the town was the centre of a comitatus and retained its role as one of the largest administrative, economic and religious centres. The emperors lived here for a long time and used Boruyi as a second capital. For two centuries it was the residence of the Byzantine emperors of the Komnenos family. From here they organized campaigns against the northern invaders - the Pechenegs and Cumans.

The stone reliefs from Stara Zagora from the 8th - 9th centuries are of high cultural and historical value, they are recognized as a masterpiece of fine art and are one of the most interesting archaeological finds in Europe.

By the end of the 10th century, the city was in Bulgarian hands and acquired a fully Bulgarian character. Bulgarians called the town Borui (a modified form of the Thracian Beroe).

The traveller Al-Idrisi, who visited the town, reported that in the 11th-12th centuries the road from the town of Veroi to the now unidentified town of Patsimiscus passed through successive fields of crops, continuous cultivated fields, large villages, many vineyards, orchards, past numerous herds of sheep, cattle and small livestock. During the Crusades, when the troops of Frederick I Barbarossa were passing through the Balkans, the Austrian priest Ansbert, who had access to the imperial chancellery, wrote of the town of Vereia as a "large, rich city" which the crusaders captured, sacked, and burned.

In 1208 the Bulgarians defeated the Latin Empire in the battle of Boruy, also fought nearby.

=== Ottoman rule ===
The Ottomans conquered Stara Zagora in 1371. The earliest Ottoman document mentioning the town is from 1430. The Ottomans, knowing about the old history of the town as the centre of the Zagore region, welded a huge amount of cultural and historical heritage in the town and in the early years named it with various similar names - Zagr-i Atik (Ancient Zagra), Zagra-i Atik Hisar (Ancient City of Zagra), Zagra, Zagra-i Eski Hisar, Zagral Eskisi (Old Zagra), Eski Zagora (Ancient Zagora), Zagrasi Atik, Zagralie Eskisi, Eskisi Zagora (Old Zagora). Later, however, in the seventeenth century, a single form - Eski Zagra. According to Evliya Celebi, in the 17th century there were 3000 houses in Stara Zagora, about 760 roads and 14 neighborhoods. At that time there were 5 mosques. There was also 1 madrasah, 42 schools, 5 hamams (named Alaja, Pasha, Yeni, Chifte and Kyuchuk hamams), 1 besisten and 855 dukhans. It does not mention the presence of a Bulgarian population in the city, although there is evidence of tombstones with Bulgarian names. Further evidence of this is a surviving Greek inscription in the church of St. Demetrius, which indicates the presence of a church on this site long before 1743, serving the Christian population.

In 1738 the population of Stara Zagora was predominantly Turkish. In 1788, a plague epidemic raged, and in 1792, famine and drought, livestock pestilence, and hailstorms destroyed all crops. During this time, military contingents passed through the settlements for punitive purposes, 'stripping the naked man of his shirt and the barefoot man of his shoes'. The worst years, however, were 1813, 1814 and 1815: these were the plague years known as the 'Great Plague' or 'Great Carron'. The next plague epidemic came in 1837 and was called 'The Little Plague'. A grade school was built in 1840 and the city's name was changed to Zheleznik (Железник; a Slavic translation of Beroe) in 1854 instead of the Turkish Eskizağra (Also called Zağra-i Atik), but was renamed once again to Stara Zagora in 1870. It was an administrative centre in Edirne Vilayet before 1878 as "Zağra-i Atik".

==== Stara Zagora Uprising ====
The Herzegovina uprising in 1875 prompted Bulgarian revolutionaries to become active. On 12 August 1875, on the initiative of Hristo Botev and Stefan Stambolov, an extraordinary national assembly was held in Bucharest, which decided to declare an immediate armed uprising in Bulgaria. Stara Zagora was chosen as the centre of the uprising. Kolyo Ganchev was elected the leader of the uprising in the town. The uprising was dispersed by the Ottomans, but served as an impetus for the liberation through the April Uprising in 1876.

=== Battle and Stara Zagora massacre ===
On 31 July 1877, the first major battle of the Russo-Turkish War took place near Stara Zagora. The 48,000-strong Turkish army advanced on the town, which was defended only by a small Russian detachment and a unit of Bulgarian volunteers. After a six-hour fight for Stara Zagora, the Russian soldiers and Bulgarian volunteers surrendered to the pressure of the larger enemy army. The town then experienced its greatest tragedy when the Turkish army carried out a massacre against the unarmed civilians. The city was burned down and razed to the ground during three ensuing days of carnage. 14,500 Bulgarians from the town and villages south of the town lost their lives. Another 10,000 young women and girls were sold in the slave markets of the Ottoman Empire. All Christian churches were attacked with artillery and burned. The only public building surviving the fire was the mosque, Eski Dzhamiya, which still stands today. Several monuments in modern Stara Zagora commemorate these events.

=== Eastern Rumelia ===
After the Liberation of Bulgaria from Ottoman rule in 1878, Stara Zagora became part of autonomous Eastern Rumelia as a department centre before the two Bulgarian states finally merged in 1886 as a result of the Unification of Bulgaria. The reconstruction of Stara Zagora began immediately after the Liberation. For this purpose, in 1878, the famous architect from Austria-Hungary, Lubor Bayer, arrived in Stara Zagora and designed the modern rectangular checkerboard layout characteristic of today's Stara Zagora. On 5 October 1879 the governor general of Eastern Rumelia Alexander Bogoridi laid the symbolic first stone for the reconstruction of the town. The only other town in Bulgaria with such a spatial plan was Nova Zagora, which was also burnt by the Turks.

=== Ancient monuments ===
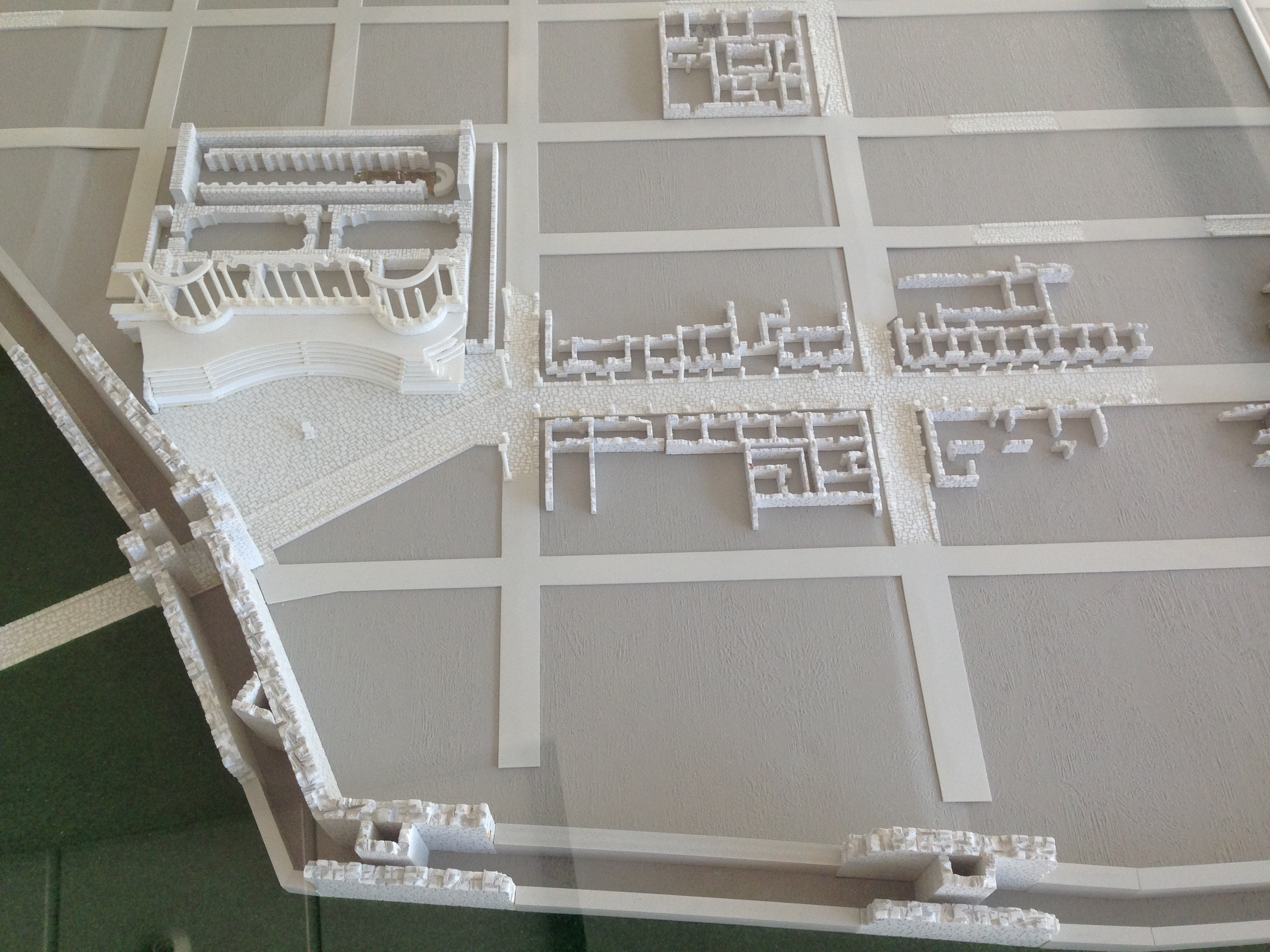
Model of south west quarter showing double walls and Antique forum with "auditorium"

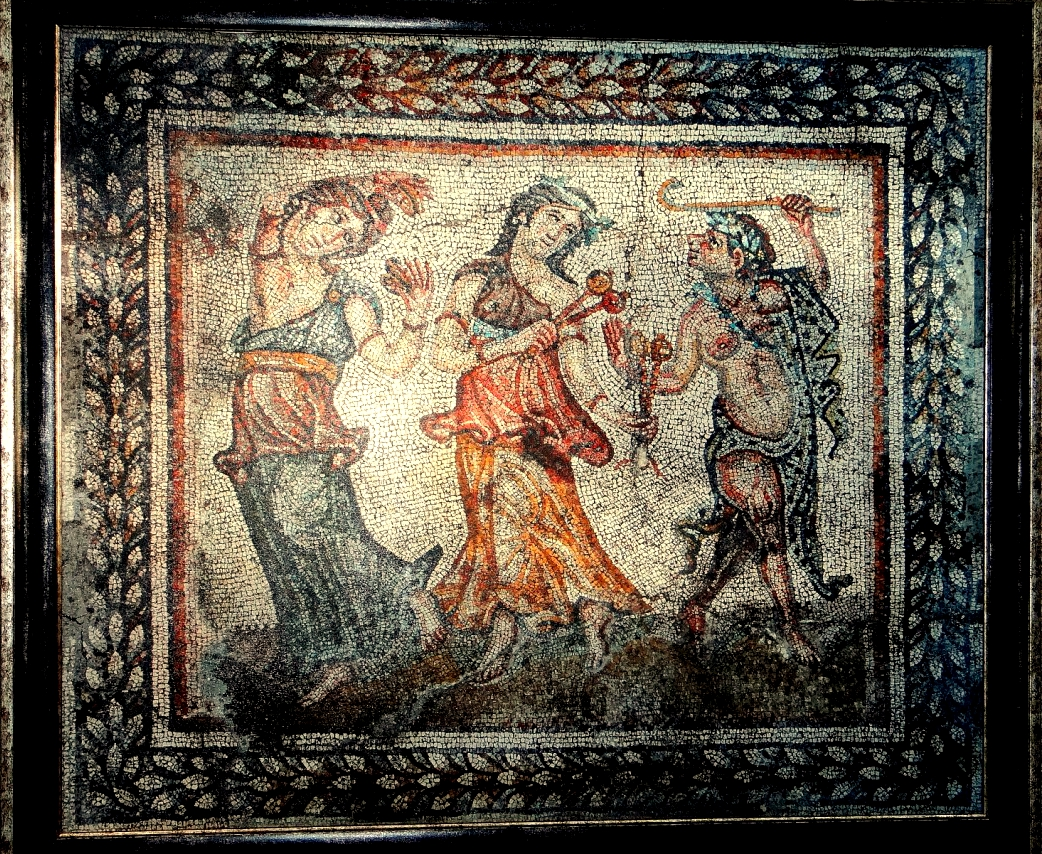
“Dionysus’s Procession” mosaic from 4th century house

Many of the monuments from the Roman city have been excavated and are visible in situ today and include:

- City walls
- The "Antique" Forum
- Roman city streets and buildings
- The Roman Baths
- 4th-6th c. public building with mosaics
- 4th c. private house with mosaics of Silenus with Bacchantes and of Dionysus's Procession
- South city gate
- Thracian Tomb

Overlooking the "antique" forum is an unusual building in the form of a monumental auditorium in the shape of a theatre.

== Geography ==
Stara Zagora is the administrative centre of its municipality and the Stara Zagora Province. It is about 231 kilometres (144 mi) from Sofia, near the Bedechka river in the historic region of Thrace.

=== Climate ===
The city is in an area of a humid subtropical climate. The average yearly temperature is about 14 °C (57 °F).

Climate data for Stara Zagora (2002-2014)
Month	Jan	Feb	Mar	Apr	May	Jun	Jul	Aug	Sep	Oct	Nov	Dec	Year
Mean daily maximum °C (°F)	6.5 (43.7)	8.7 (47.7)	14.1 (57.4)	18.6 (65.5)	24.5 (76.1)	28.0 (82.4)	31.5 (88.7)	31.2 (88.2)	26.7 (80.1)	20.5 (68.9)	13.8 (56.8)	7.8 (46.0)	19.3 (66.7)
Daily mean °C (°F)	2.0 (35.6)	3.5 (38.3)	8.0 (46.4)	13.4 (56.1)	18.7 (65.7)	23.0 (73.4)	25.2 (77.4)	25.0 (77.0)	21.0 (69.8)	15.3 (59.5)	9.5 (49.1)	3.9 (39.0)	13.0 (55.4)
Mean daily minimum °C (°F)	−1.5 (29.3)	−0.8 (30.6)	3.1 (37.6)	8.2 (46.8)	13.0 (55.4)	17.1 (62.8)	18.9 (66.0)	18.8 (65.8)	14.5 (58.1)	10.2 (50.4)	5.8 (42.4)	1.0 (33.8)	9.0 (48.2)
Average precipitation mm (inches)	47 (1.9)	35 (1.4)	37 (1.5)	51 (2.0)	71 (2.8)	66 (2.6)	57 (2.2)	48 (1.9)	32 (1.3)	45 (1.8)	57 (2.2)	52 (2.0)	598 (23.6)
Source: [Stringmeteo.com]

=== Flora and fauna ===
The territory of Stara Zagora municipality falls within the Middle Bulgarian biogeographical region - the Upper Thracian Lowland sub-region, characterized by a predominantly flat nature, intensive agriculture and significant urbanization. This predetermines a largely poor in composition and abundance biodiversity. Characteristic forest communities are xerothermic forests and the composition is diverse.

The only scientifically known locality of a plant species protected by the Biodiversity Act is that in the Karasivria locality, north of the town. It is located in the north of Stara Zagora, in the area of Spiraea hypercifolia. The species is also included in the Red Book of Bulgaria.

The fauna in the area is composed of European, Euro-Siberian and Holopalearctic species. Along with these, many warm Mediterranean, transitional Mediterranean, pre-Asian and steppe species are common. The extent of occurrence of rare species and endemism is most pronounced in invertebrates.

== Population ==
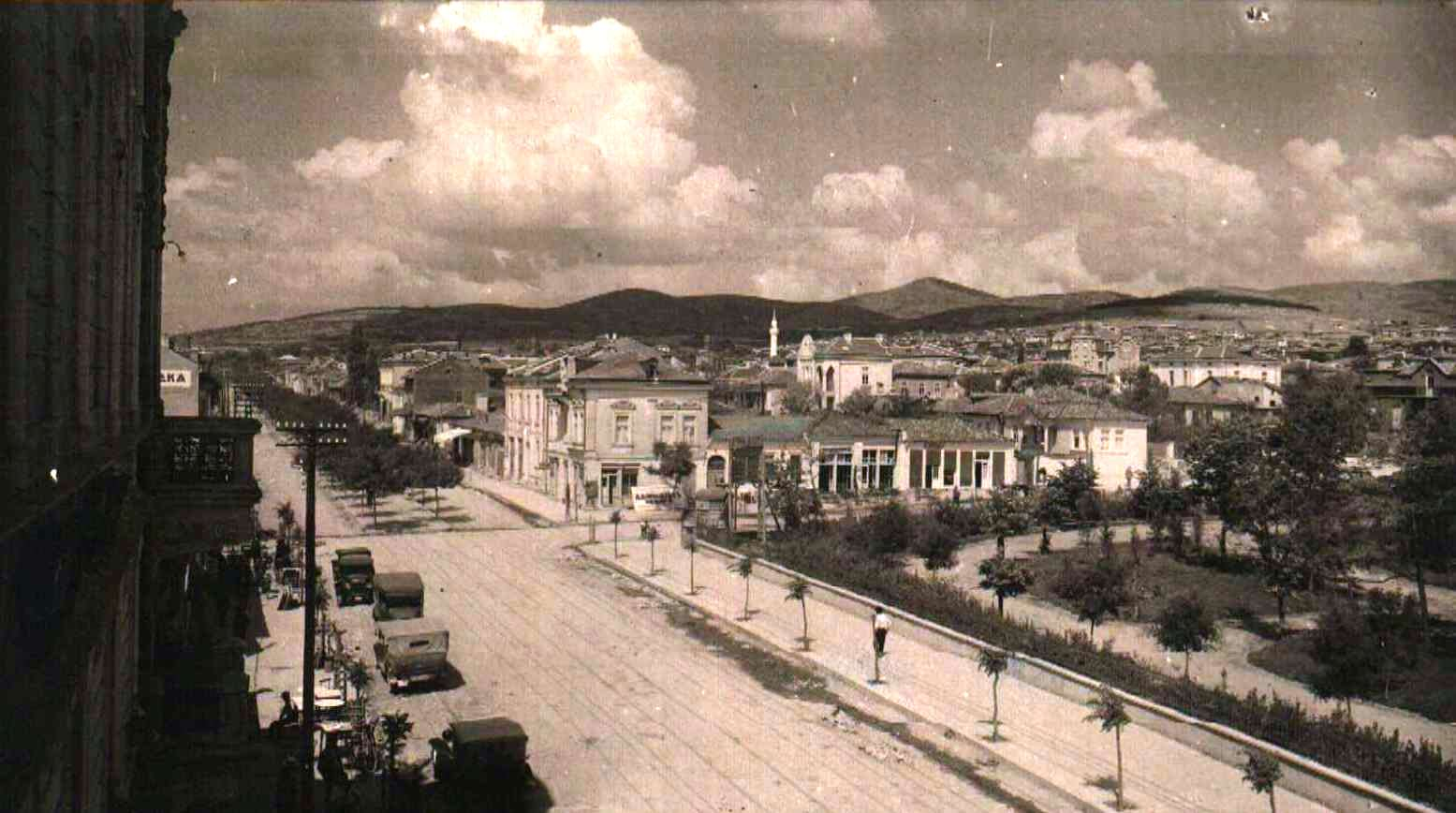
Stara Zagora in the 1930s

Historical population
Year	Pop.	±%
1887	16,039	—
1900	19,516	+21.7%
1910	22,003	+12.7%
1920	25,314	+15.0%
1934	29,825	+17.8%
1946	38,325	+28.5%
1956	55,094	+43.8%
1965	88,621	+60.9%
1975	122,277	+38.0%
1985	150,803	+23.3%
1992	150,518	−0.2%
2001	143,420	−4.7%
2011	138,272	−3.6%
2021	122,536	−11.4%

Stara Zagora was possibly the biggest city in today's Bulgarian territory before liberation from Ottoman rule. But the city was burned and destroyed by Turkish army during the Liberation war in 1877–1878, with some 30,000 citizens from Stara Zagora and nearby villages perishing in the Stara Zagora massacre. During the first decade after the liberation of Bulgaria, in the 1880s the population of Stara Zagora decreased and numbered about 16,000. Since then it started growing decade by decade, mostly because of the migrants from the rural areas and the surrounding smaller towns, reaching its peak in the period 1989-1991 exceeding 160,000. After this time, the population has started decreasing mostly because of the migration to the capital city of Sofia or abroad.

=== Ethnic linguistic and religious composition ===
According to the latest 2011 census data, individuals who declared their ethnic identity were distributed as follows:

- Bulgarians: 117,963 (93.2%)
- Romani: 5,430 (4.3%)
- Turks: 1,965 (1.6%)
- Others: 579 (0.5%)
- Indefinable: 617 (0.5%)
- Undeclared: 11,718 (8.5%)

Total: 138,272

== Economy ==
=== Economy ===
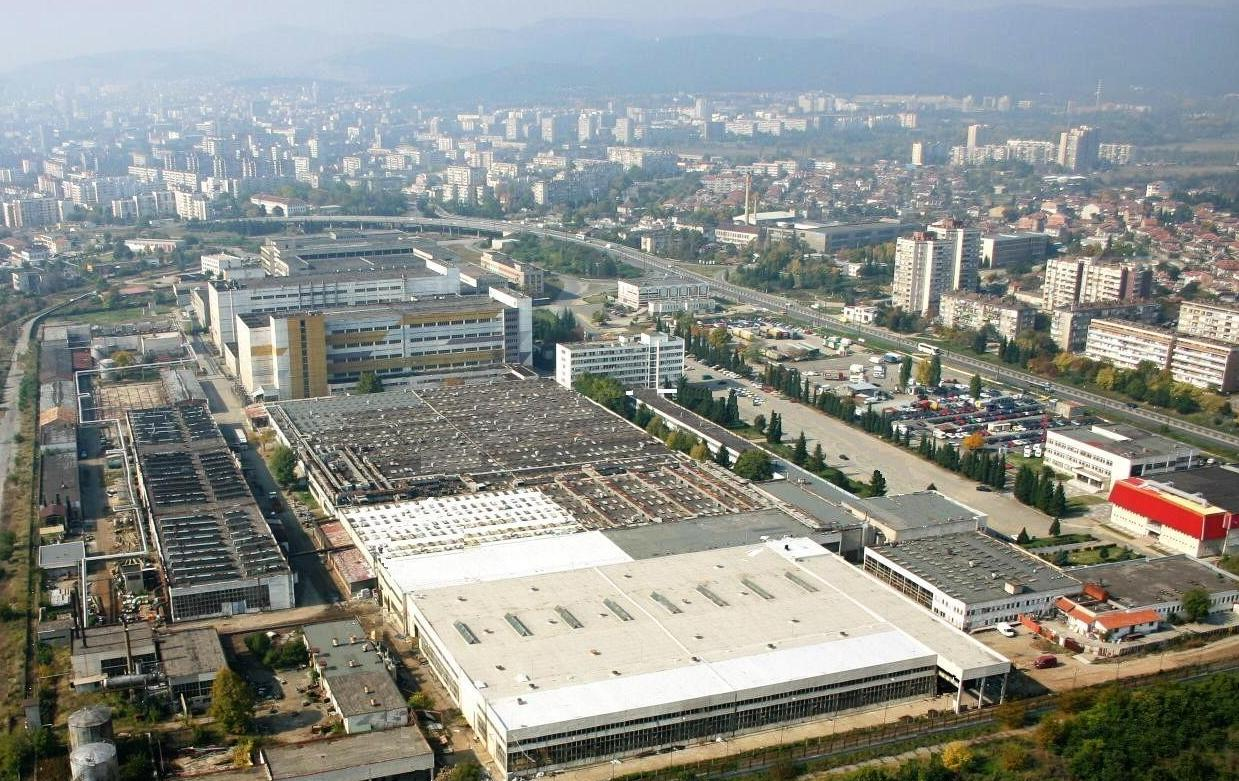
Business Park of Stara Zagora.

The Stara Zagora region is dynamically developing and by a number of indicators is in a leading position in the country. In 2004, the region had a record high growth of 26% in the value of manufactured output, 23% in sales and 24.6% in gross domestic product.

According to the regional administration, in 2004 and 2005 the Stara Zagora region now ranks second in terms of gross domestic product (GDP) and retains third place in terms of human development index (HDI). HDI is determined by GDP per capita, literacy rate, life expectancy, etc. In 2004, foreign direct investment in the region amounted to EUR 838 million (compared to a total of EUR 2020 million for Bulgaria), representing over 40% of all investment in the country. Around 600 million euros of the investments were in the energy sector.

Unemployment in Stara Zagora, March 2008
1. Employed (96.0%)
2. Unemployed (4.00%)

According to a survey conducted by the NGO Industry Watch in the second quarter of 2005, Stara Zagora ranks second (after Sofia) in terms of average wages among the 27 regional centres in Bulgaria. This applies to both nominal and real wages, determined on the basis of the ratio to purchasing power. In March 2008, Stara Zagora has one of the highest wages in the country and the unemployment is under 4%.

The largest employer in Stara Zagora is the Maritsa Iztok Complex. It employs about 20 000 people in the district, of which about 10 000 are residents of Stara Zagora. It provides 30% of Bulgaria's electricity and are the largest coal producer in Bulgaria (83%). In the industrial complex, wages are among the highest in Bulgaria. Stara Zagora distributes the electricity produced in Maritsa East. The company holds a license for distribution of electricity from the State Energy Regulatory Commission for a period of 35 years on the territory of Southern Bulgaria. The company employs 1771 people. Large companies dealing with equipment for petrol stations, gas stations and methane stations are Efir Stara Zagora and Izot servis. The largest brewery in Bulgaria - "Zagorka", part of the Heineken group is located in Stara Zagora. It holds about 30% of the beer market in the country. Over 800 people work there. Stara Zagora is also the headquarters of the wine producer Domaine Menada, which since 2002 has been owned by the French company Marie Brizard Wine & Spirits. The winery is one of the most prosperous on the Bulgarian market, as well as an exporter of wine abroad. Domaine Menada and Oryahovitsa are producers of Cabernet Sauvignon wines, as well as Merlot, Ruby, Chardonnay, Dimiat and other varieties. In 2004, major investments were made for new facilities at the winery as well as for new vineyards. Another winery is in the village of Oryahovitsa, 15 km from Stara Zagora.

Other important enterprises in the town are: DZU; Progress cast iron plant; Textile fibre plant; Tool and non-standard equipment plant; Process equipment plant; Metal structures plant; Forging and pressing plant ''Preskov''; Food industry machinery plant "Hraninvest - Hranmashkomplekt"; "Sredna Gora" Furniture Enterprise; "Natalia" Hosiery Factory; "Zagore" Grain Mill; "Zagoria" Pasta Factory; "Biser Oliva" Sunflower Oil Factory; "Gradus" Poultry Factory, etc. In 2006, the international consortium "Linde Group" invested nearly EUR 10 million on the territory of "Agrobiochem", building a high-tech air separation station where oxygen, nitrogen and argon are extracted with high purity.

Stara Zagora is the centre of the rich agricultural region of Zagore, famous for its wheat, production of various cereals, crops, vegetables, fruits, grapes. They serve for the food production and raw materials for the food industry. The Stara Zagora sheep has been used since 1950 as a rootstock in the creation of the Thracian thin-horned sheep.

In March 2006, Stara Zagora started the construction of the Stara Zagora Business Park on an area of 260 acres in the eastern part of the city. Partial infrastructure was built, but due to the crisis its development was suspended.

=== Industry ===
In 2008, the first shopping mall - Park Mall Stara Zagora - opened its doors in Stara Zagora, located on 30 000 m^{2} of built-up area, of which 20 000 m^{2} are commercial. In the building there is a cinema "Arena" with 6 halls and a total of 950 seats, a three-dimensional cinema, a hypermarket "Jumbo", as well as other objects. 25 million euros have been invested in the mall and over 800 jobs have been created.

In 2010 the largest shopping centre in Stara Zagora and the region - Galleria Stara Zagora - opened its doors. It is located on 36 400 m^{2} of built-up area, of which 26 000 m^{2} are commercial. In the building there is a cinema "Cinema City" with 7 halls and a total of 1,300 seats, a three-dimensional cinema, as well as more than 100 other objects. 65 million euros have been invested in the mall and over 500 jobs have been created.

Stara Zagora City Centre has also been built, with an area (retail, offices and residential) of over 18,000 m^{2} spread over 5 levels and over 10,000 m^{2} of parking.

== Transport ==
The city's geographical location makes connections with the rest of the country well developed. Stara Zagora is a major railway junction, through which pass the railway lines Sofia-Stara Zagora-Burgas and railway line 4 Ruse-Podkova (project for extension through the Makaza pass to Alexandroupolis on the Aegean Sea)/Svilengrad.

Stara Zagora Airport is located in the Kolyo Ganchev district and has a long runway suitable for large aircraft, but has not been operational since the early 1990s.

Pan-European corridors VIII and IX, out of a total of five, cross the territory of the country. Since 2007, the Trakia motorway runs a few kilometres south of the town. Bus links connect Stara Zagora with other major cities in Bulgaria.

The trolleybus system consists of 4 routes, all being important for the urban transportation network in Stara Zagora. It first opened in November 1987 and has a stock of 28 trolleybuses. The other important factor for the transportation is the bus system, consisting of 34 bus lines.

== Education ==
The foundations of higher education in Stara Zagora were laid on 30 October 1974. Trakia University, established in 1995, is located in the western part of the city. Its structure includes the Faculty of Medicine, the Faculty of Veterinary Medicine, the Faculty of Economics, the Faculty of Pedagogy and the Faculty of Agriculture.

== Sports ==
PFC Beroe Stara Zagora is a football club in Stara Zagora. It was established in 1916 and plays at Beroe Stadium. The team is a member of the First Professional Football League. Beroe has won the Bulgarian Cup two times (2009-2010 and 2012-2013).

== Main sights ==
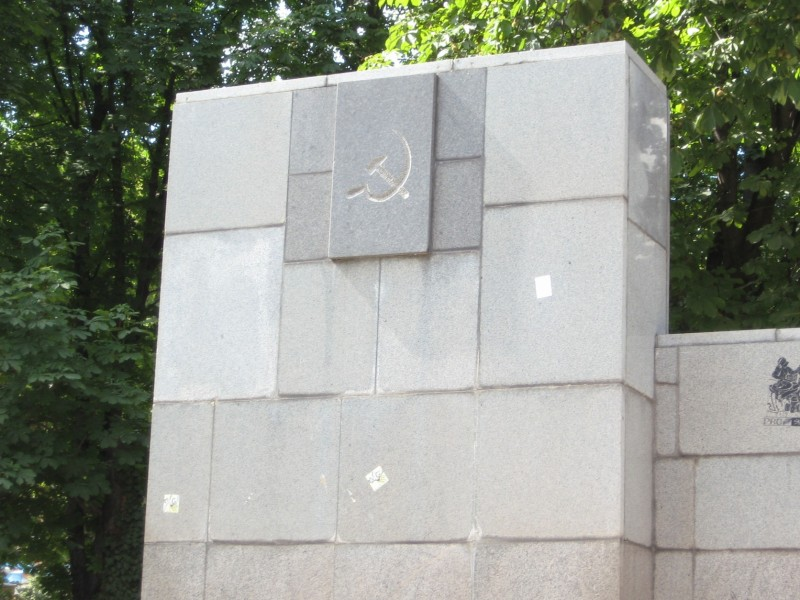
A Communist era statue at a park in the centre of town.

- Regional Historical Museum
- The Antique Forum
- Thracian Tomb
- The Roman Baths
- Roman mosaics of “Silenus with Bacchantes" (4th century) and of Dionysus's Procession
- The Samarsko Zname Monument
- Ayazmoto Park
- Defenders of Stara Zagora Memorial Complex
- Memorial House of Geo Milev
- The South Gate of Augusta Trajana
- The Opera House, built in 1925
- Stara Zagora Transmitter with one of the few Blaw-Knox Towers in Europe
- Neolithic Dwellings Museum

== Coat of arms ==
Coat of arms of Stara Zagora.

The coat of arms of Stara Zagora was created in 1979 for the 100th anniversary of the rebuilding of the town, when the municipality made a decision to create a new coat of arms. The task of composing it was given to artist Hristo Tanev. (Another source states that it was adopted in 1996.)

The symbolic meaning of the shield is to protect, defend and provide sanctuary. To emphasize this the upper edge of the shield is shaped like a castle wall.

The central part, on a red background, depicts a mother lion suckling a lion cub. This image has been taken from a 12th-century rock carving found in Stara Zagora in 1949 which has become one of the city symbols. The lioness, representing the mother instinct, is placed in the central part of the shield, and has not only historical but symbolic meaning, to show that despite what the city has been through in the past thousands of year it still continues its existence and continues its progress. The lower part of the shield has a green background with golden-yellow stripes which converging towards the center. This represents the fertility of the town's fields and is also a symbol of roads to the future.

== Districts ==
Districts of Stara Zagora

- Bedechka - Gradinski (Бедечка - Градински, named at river Bedechka)
- Central City Part (includes Supercentre, Chayka & Zagorka) (Централна градска част (Суперцентър, Чайка и Загорка) - Chayka - Sea-gull, Zagorka - named after Zagorka brewery)
- Makedonski (Македонски - Macedonian) know also as Chumleka (Чумлека)
- Dabrava (Дъбрава - former village of Dabrava)
- Eastern Industrial Zone (Източна индустриална зона)
- Geo Milev (Гео Милев - named after the Bulgarian poet)
- Golesh (Голеш)
- Industrial Zone (Индустриална Зона)
- Kazanski (Казански)
- Kolyo Ganchev (Кольо Ганчев - named after the famous Bulgarian revolutionary)
- Lozenets (Лозенец - from лозе - vineyard)
- Mitropolit Metodiy Kusev (Митрополит Методий Кусев - named after a famous Starozagorian bishop)
- Opalchenski (Опълченски - Volunteer's district named after Bulgarian voluntary army units) also known as Chaika (Чайка - Sea-Gull)
- Samara 1, 2 & 3 - (Самара 1, 2 и 3 - named after the sister city of Samara, Russia)
- Slaveykov (Славейков - named after the famous Bulgarian poet Petko Slaveykov)
- Studentski grad - (Студентски град - Student town)
- Tri Chuchura north, centre & south - (Три чучура север, център и юг - "Three spouts")
- Vasil Levski - (Васил Левски - named after the famous Bulgarian revolutionary)
- Vazrazhdane - (Възраждане - Renaissance)
- Zheleznik (small & big) (Железник - like one of the former names of the city)
- Zora (Зора - Dawn)

Future districts :

- Atyuren (Атюрен - future district of the city)
- Bogomilovo (Богомилово - village of Bogomilovo)
- Hrishteni (Хрищени - village of Hrishteni)
- Malka Vereya (Малка Верея - Vereya - old name of the city, Malka - small, village of Malka Vereya)

== People ==
- Anelia, singer
- Anna Tomowa-Sintow, dramatic soprano opera singer
- Vesselina Kasarova, coloratura mezzo-soprano opera singer
- Edith Schönert-Geiß, numismatist who was awarded Freedom of the City
- Vesselin Stoykov, bass-bariton opera singer
- Stefan Kisyov, writer
- Stefan Slivkov, revolutionary, mayor of Stara Zagora (1885-1886) and Bulgarian National Assemblyman
- Lenko Latkov, serial killer

== Other ==
- One of the two lighting factories Svetlina is situated here.

== Twin towns and sister cities ==
Stara Zagora is twinned with:

- Barreiro, Portugal
- Kruševac, Serbia
- Radom, Poland
- Larissa, Greece
- Samara, Russia
- Yueyang, China

== See also ==
- Stara Zagora Airport
- Coat of arms of Stara Zagora
- Kalvacha Airport
- Trolleybuses in Stara Zagora
- Stara Zagora street (Samara)
