= Ilian Todorov =

Bulgarian politician

- Илиан Тодоров
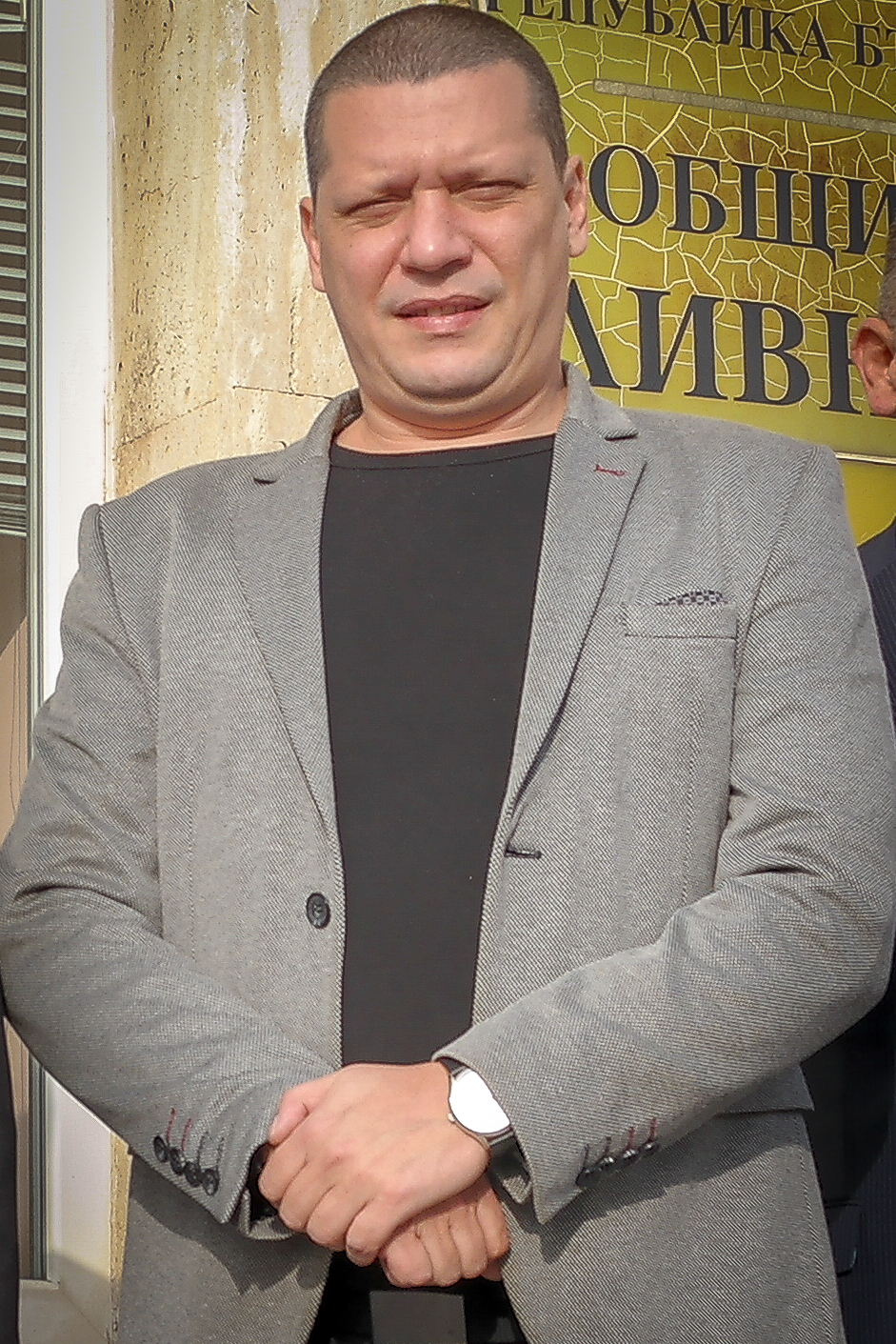
- Todorov in 2019

Member of the National Assembly
- In office 2013 – 2017
- Constituency: Kyustendil (2013–2014); Blagoevgrad (2014–2017)

Personal details
- Born: 1 November 1980 (age 45) Sofia, People's Republic of Bulgaria
- Party: Attack

Ilian Sashov Todorov (Bulgarian: Илиан Сашов Тодоров) is a Bulgarian politician from Attack. From 2011 he worked as a regional coordinator in Attack for South-West Bulgaria. On the 2013 election he was leading the lists in two regions.
