= Ilian Mihov =

Bulgarian economist

- Born: 1966 (age 59–60); Samokov, Bulgaria
- Education: University of South Carolina's Moore School of Business; Princeton University
- Occupation: Academic
- Known for: Former dean of INSEAD

Ilian Mihov (born 1966, Samokov, Bulgaria) (Bulgarian: Илиян Михов) is a Bulgarian economist and the former Dean and the Rausing Chaired Professor of Economic and Business Transformation at INSEAD.

== Early life ==
Mihov was born in 1966 in Samokov, Bulgaria. He graduated from the University of South Carolina's Moore School of Business and he earned a PhD in economics from Princeton University, where his thesis supervisor was Ben Bernanke. He joined INSEAD in 1996 and served as its Dean from 2013 to 2023.

== Career ==
Mihov has published research in macroeconomic questions, especially regarding monetary policy, fiscal policy, and economic growth. He is a fellow of the Center for Economic Policy Research.

In 2010, after serving as an economic adviser to the Bulgarian Government, he was appointed by Bulgarian Prime Minister Boyko Borisov to be Bulgaria's Deputy Prime Minister in charge of Bulgaria's efforts to join the Eurozone and of coordinating EU funding, but never took up the position. He has been a member of the Scientific Committee of the Banque de France's Research Foundation, the Advisory Board of the Bulgarian National Bank, and the World Economic Forum’s Global Agenda Council.

In 2018, Mihov was recognized as a HeForShe Leader by the UN Women Singapore Committee.

== Personal life ==
Mihov currently resides in Singapore.
