= Trakia University =

Coordinates: 42°23′54″N 25°34′17″E

- Тракийски университет
- Type: Public
- Established: 1995
- Affiliations: EUA
- Rector: Prof. Dr. Miroslav Karabaliev
- Administrative staff: 1000
- Students: approx. 9000
- Location: Student Town Quarter, Stara Zagora, Bulgaria, Stara Zagora, Bulgaria
- Campus: Urban
- Website: https://trakia-uni.bg

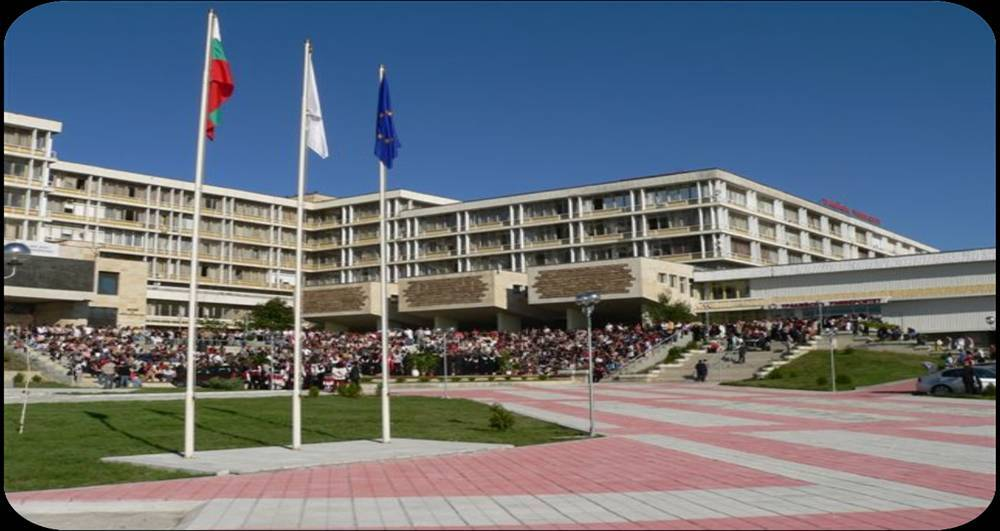
The campus seen in 2011

The Trakia University or Thrace University (Bulgarian: Тракийски университет, Trakiyski universitet) is a Bulgarian university in the city of Stara Zagora. It was named after the historical region of Thrace and was established in 1995.

The university organizes training on programs with four educational and qualification degrees: Bachelor, Master and PhD, as well as on programs for qualification and post-graduate training in the system of lifelong education. Whilst the university has been teaching in the local languages for a number of years, it has recently started teaching in English in the majors Medicine and Veterinary Medicine.

Trakia University is accredited by the National Assessment and Accreditation Agency at the Council of Ministers. A diploma with the relevant certification level is issued.

== Faculties ==
- Faculty of Agriculture with training experimental base
- Faculty of Veterinary Medicine with clinics
- Faculty of Medicine
- Faculty of Pedagogy
- Faculty of Engineering and Technology (former Technical College - Yambol)
- Faculty of Economic
- Faculty of Education
- Medical College, Stara Zagora
- Department for information in-service teacher training
- Affiliate- Haskovo
- University Hospital
