= Anelia =

Bulgarian pop-folk singer (born 1982)

Anelia Анелия
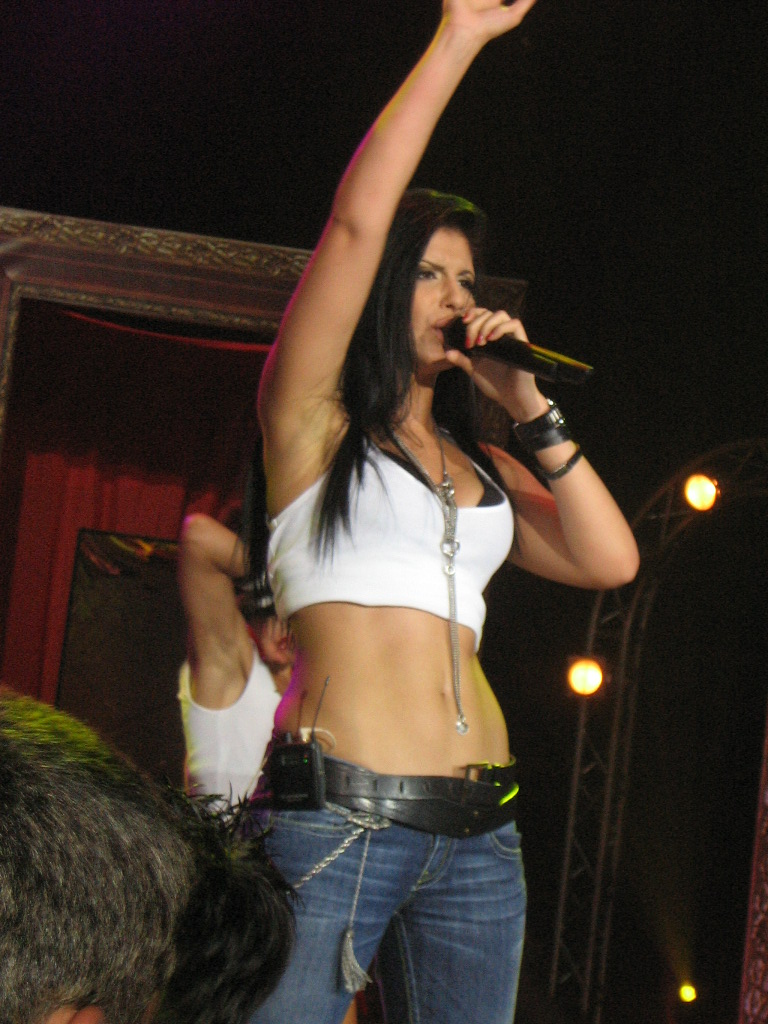

Background information
- Born: Aneliya Georgieva Atanasova; 1 July 1982 (age 43); Stara Zagora, Bulgaria
- Genres: Pop-folk, Chalga, Balkan pop
- Occupations: Singer-songwriter, composer
- Instrument: Vocals
- Years active: 2002–present
- Label: Payner
- Website: www.facebook.com/AneliaOnline

Aneliya Georgieva Atanasova (Bulgarian: Анелия Георгиева Атанасова, born 1 July 1982), better known mononymously as Anelia (Bulgarian: Анелия), is a Bulgarian pop-folk singer. She gained popularity in Bulgaria with her second single "Погледни ме в очите" (Look Me in the Eyes), released in 2002. Throughout her career, 23 of her singles have topped the Bulgarian music charts which makes her one of the most successful recording female artists in Bulgarian music. In 2012, for the first time in her career, Anelia won the Artist of the Year award at the Annual Music Awards of Planeta TV.

== Biography ==
Anelia Georgieva Atanasova was born in Stara Zagora, Bulgaria on 1 July 1982, to Svetla and Georgi Atanasov. The family members on her maternal side were professional musicians. She has an older sister, Radost.

Discovered as a talent in the elementary school while she was in second grade by her teacher Slavka Ivanova, she started performing on several occasions singing folk songs. At the age of 12 she became a part of trio "Гласовити Тракийчета". In 1994 the band had recorded and released a compilation of Thracian songs through a record company Balkanton. After that she was singing in the small chorus of ensemble "Загорче". At the age of 19, she was signed up to the Payner Music, the biggest pop-folk company in Bulgaria. In 1996 Anelia was accepted as a first student in her grade in "Philip Kutev" music school with a score of 100% on the Bulgarian instrument Gadulka. Later on, she won many awards for her skills on the instrument. In 1997, her father died. When asked if she had three wishes, Anelia answered with "I don’t have three wishes- I have only one. That is for my father to see how far I’ve come and to share my success with him.”

In the second course of her studying, Anelia began singing more and training her voice to improve her singing technique. In her third year at the school, she began singing in public bars in her native city. In the summer of 2005, Anelia was accepted in "Pancho Vladigerov" as number one in her grade for pop and jazz.

== Professional career ==
In 2002 she recorded her first song "Чужди устни" (English: "Stranger’s lips") . Her second song recorded for Payner "Погледни ме в очите" ("Look me in the eyes") became an instant hit in Bulgaria. It became one of the fastest selling singles in the Bulgarian music history and is still the most successful single of Anelia.

In December 2002 she released her first album. The album Погледни ме в очите had become her all-time best-selling album. According to her official website up to 100,000 copies of the album had been sold by year 2003. All the songs were co-written and co-produced with Todor Dimitrov. Dimitrov was also her manager, until the end of their cooperation in 2007.

In April 2004 Anelia released her second album. Не поглеждай назад ("Don't look back") sold over 60,000 copies and brought hits like "Обичай ме" ("Love me"), "Искам те" ("I want you"), "Две тела" ("Two bodies") and "Една минута" ("One minute"). The song "Обичай ме" was dedicated to now her ex-husband, Konstantin Dinev. In March 2005 her first DVD compilation was released. In August, Anelia released her third studio album Всичко води към теб ("Everything leads to you"). The single "Everything leads to you" became the biggest summer hit in the BG. In 2006 she released her fourth album, called Пепел от рози ("Rose ashes"). "Пепел от рози" produced hits like "До зори" ("By dawn"), Само за миг ("Only for a moment"), Вятър в косите ти ("Wind in your hair") and "Щом си до мен" ("When you are by my side").

On her fifth studio album Единствен ти (One And Only You), released in 2008, she cooperated with Tencho Yanchev and Ivan Ivanov. The album features a new musical direction for Anelia into a pop dance music genre rather than chalga. The song "Все едно ми е" shows electronic, house and club music influences, other songs like Забранявам си (I forbid you) or Единствен ти surprise with a more up-beat, electronic arrangements.

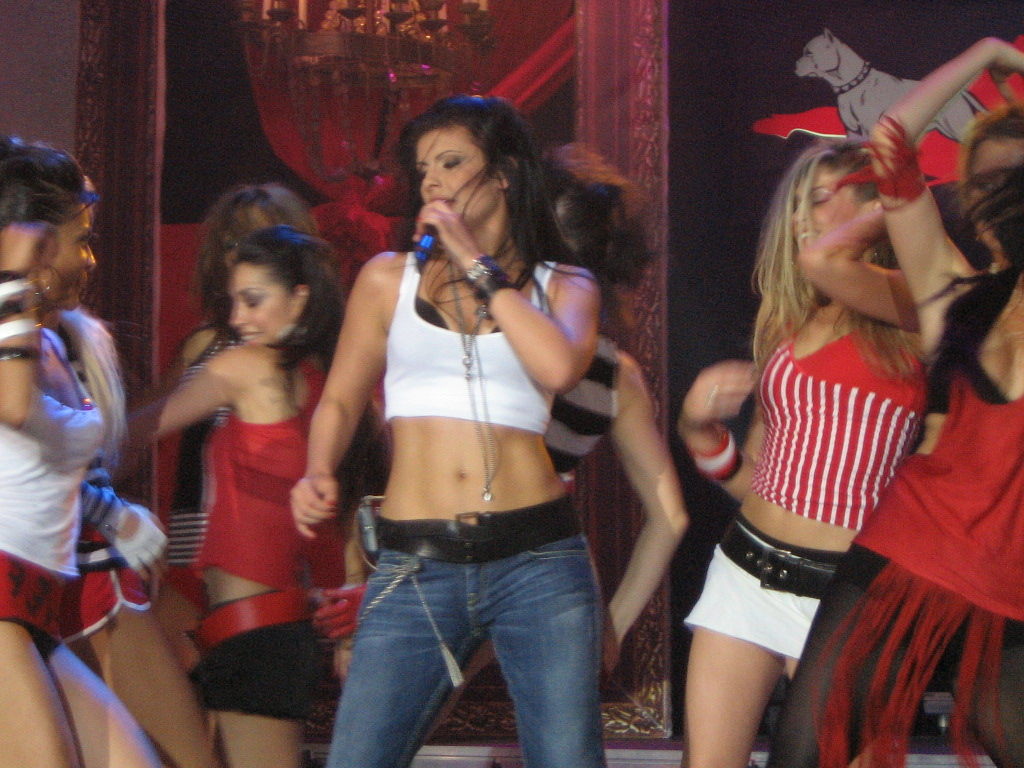
Anelia performing

Her next album "Добрата, лошата (The good one, the bad one) was released in March 2010. Especially for his new album, the singer made a new, provocative and very avant-garde photo shoot with photographer Velislava Kaymakanova. "Добрата, лошата" features rich variety of music styles but remains faithful to its pop-folk background. The production has been promoted with very successful singles like "Две неща" ("Two things") featuring Eliyah and "Обичам те" (I love you). "Две неща" has reached Number 1 in "Nov Folk Hit Folk 30" November and "Signal Plus Top 50" charts. The next Anelia's single – "Ако с теб не съм" ("If I'm not with you") peaked Noof "Planeta Hit 50". In the beginning of June 2010, Anelia promoted her new single – "Four seconds", the first single after the release of the album. The songs features Gamzata, the most famous Bulgarian trumpeter. The video clip was shot by Nikolay Nankov, an award-winning Bulgarian director.

Her next single "Раздялата" (The break-up) was released in November 2010. The video was also shot by Nikolay Nankov. The song was also remixed by the Bulgarian arranger Maga. In March 2011, her next single – "That's how I like you" (Така ме кефиш) was uploaded at her official Facebook profile, following by the release of the video for the song.

On 28 September 2012, Anelia's official Facebook page was hacked, after which it was deleted from the web, with its nearly 100 000 fans. Administrators restored the page, but the process took almost a month. In the second half of October that page came online again.

== Visual and musical changes ==
On 3 June, Anelia announced that she will sing "Погледни ме в очите" (Look me in the eyes) and "Готов ли си" (Are you ready) at the concert of Alexander Levski in Sofia on 9 June for the 20th anniversary of Payner and the start of the new television channel "Planeta HD". On 8 June Anelia was a guest on "The Ivan and Andre Show" on Nova TV. Anelia revealed that before her singing career, she worked as a barman. Later on she appeared on "The Slavi Show" and "The Day is Amazing" on bTV and again on "The Ivan and Andrey Show", 3 months after her first appearance. 3 months later, Anelia was on her way to America and Canada for her first prezokanako tour where she played twelve concerts. The tour had great success which led Anelia to win the award of "International Pop Folk".

On 31 December Anelia was a guest on "The Slavi Show" as a part of the new year program and she sang her hit "Четири Секунди" (Four Seconds). At the beginning of 2011, Anelia went on a vacation to the Dominican Republic She became nominated for 2 awards for "Singer of the Year" on Planeta TV in 2010 and for her song "Four Seconds". Later on she recorded a duet with singer Preslava and Elena which resulted in her receiving and award. Later on Anelia and Gumzata won the award for "Hit of the summer", which the singer has won twice during her career. On 4 March 2011 on her official Facebook page, a link to her newest song "Така ме кефиш (How you excite me) was posted. On the 3rd of April, the changes to her video clip for the song were previewed and later on during the end of August, Anelia announced that she would create an album with the first 10 years of her onstage titled “The Best" during 2012.

== 10 years on stage ==
2012 marks the 10 years that Anelia has been active onstage. On 14 May, her music video for her song "Яко ми действаш" (You work me cool) was out. Her clip with Ilian for their duet "Не Исках да те Нараня" (I didn't want to hurt you) later previewed on 25 June. The song was so popular that for 5 weeks it stayed in the Top 50 on Radio "Signal Plus". On 31 August, her new song "Да ти Викна ли Такси" (Should I call you a Taxi) was leaked, and the video for the song was soon released on 11 September. The new song quickly rose to the top again as "The Most Prestigious Song" on radio "Signal Plus".

Anelia invited Dani Milev and his band to be a part of her special "10 year" concert. During her concert she sang one of her biggest hits which captured the hearts of the public. "For me it's an honour, so many people support my music and myself. The audience is the best critique for how we have ended the job with the team that we work with" Anelia says about her concert. 30 songs were played at the concert with over 20 dancers present. "It was very hard for me with the team to choose the songs, because during the 10 years that I have been singing, I have sung so many beautiful songs so I wanted every song to be presented" Anelia says of the song choices.

A little before the concert was arranged completely, Anelia was planning a project with the singer Maria Illieva, but towards the end of 2012, many waited for the clip of the project.

== 2013 ==
On 31 January 2013, the new 3 albums of Payner hits titled "The Golden Hits" hit the stores and Anelia is chosen as No. 6 out of all Payner singers. Her biggest hits during her 11 years of activity are put on the albums.

In April 2013 the next single – "I and You" was aired on TV Planeta. A mixture of dubstep, dance, pop and folk, the song received positive reviews from public and critics and stayed on the top spot of all the famous folk charts in Bulgaria. The premiere of "I want you, I'm going crazy" was on 17 June.

== Awards and nominations ==
Awards and nominations
Kind	TV "Planeta" awards	"Nov folk" magazine awards	Love awards of "Romantika" radio	Total
Nominations	23	20	7	50
Awards	9	9	4	22

– Awards –

- 2003 – Debut of the year ["Nov folk" magazine awards]
- 2003 – First award at "Trakia Folk 2003"
- 2003 – Most prosperous young act ["Nov folk" magazine awards]
- 2004 – Best album ["TV Planeta" awards]
- 2004 – Best album ["Nov folk" magazine awards]
- 2004 – Most Beautiful Bulgarian woman ["Кой" magazine]
- 2005 – Hit of the summer /for "Everything leads to you"/ ["TV Planeta" awards]
- 2006 – Most stylish woman haircut [Pantene Beauty Awards]
- 2006 – Special award of the "Actavis" group ["TV Planeta" awards]
- 2007 – Best duet /for "Forever" with Miro/ ["TV Planeta" awards]
- 2007 – Best videoclip /for "Forever" with Miro/ ["TV Planeta" awards]
- 2007 – Best show act of "Plazza dance center" ["Нов фолк" magazine awards]
- 2007 – Best love duet /for "Forever" with Miro/ [Love awards of "Романтика" radio]
- 2008 – Miss "Pretty woman" ["OK" magazine coronation]
- 2008 – Woman of the Year in category "Scene/Music" ["Грация" magazine awards]
- 2008 – Award for special achievements in music for 2008 ["TV Planeta" awards]
- 2008 – Best album ["Нов фолк" magazine awards]
- 2008 – Best album [Love awards of "Романтика" radio]
- 2009 – Pop hit of the year ["TV Planeta" awards]
- 2009 – Best duet /for "Two things" with Ilian/ ["Нов фолк" magazine awards]
- 2009 – Best act of "Аdventure" programme [Love awards of "Романтика" radio]
- 2010 – Hit of the summer /for "Four seconds"/ ["TV Planeta" awards]
- 2010 – Best album and Vocal Mastery ["Нов фолк" magazine awards]
- 2011 – Hit of the summer /for "Trial and Error" / ["TV Planeta" Awards]
- 2011 – The Best selling album on internet and iTunes / Игри за Напреднали / ["TV Planeta" Awards]
- 2011 – Hit na Godinata / for "Trial and error" / ["Нов фолк" magazine awards]
- 2012 – Best duet /for "I did not want to hurt" with Ilian/ ["TV Planeta" awards]
- 2012 – Best Female ["TV Planeta" awards]

== On tour ==
In 2004, 2006, 2007, 2008 and 2009 Anelia take place in the biggest music event in Bulgaria – the summer tour of the folk stars, called "Planeta Prima/Derbi". Each summer, for about 3 weeks, between 8 and 11 of the biggest stars in Bulgaria are crossing the country and singing their hits in front of hundreds of thousands. In 2005, which is the only year, when Anelia missed the tour, she was preparing her third album. Recently a recording of one of her concerts leaked and was posted on YouTube suggesting that Anelia was drunk while performing. In 2010, Anelia announced that she will take part in the Seventh summer tour of Payner.

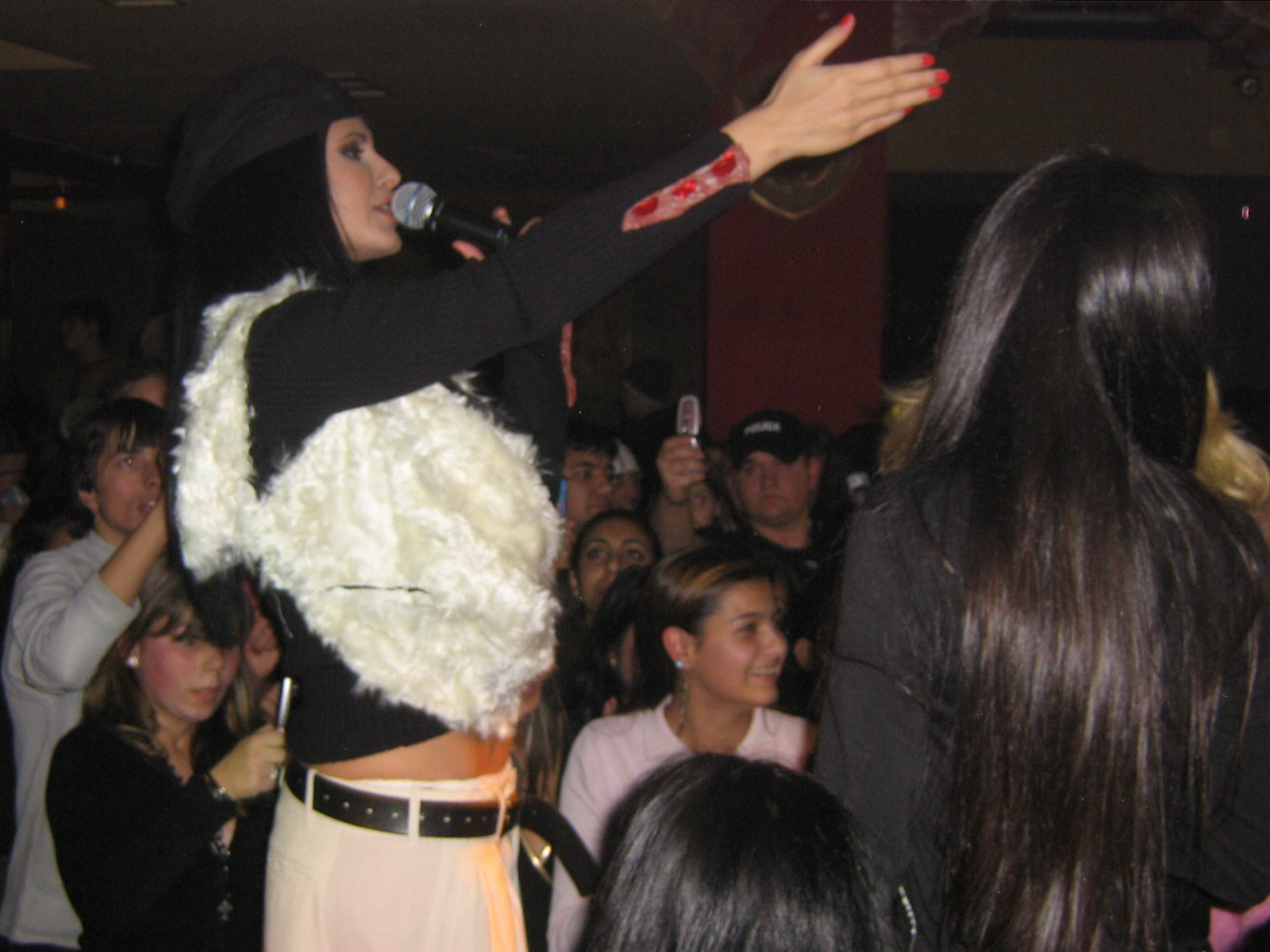
Anelia performing

== Style ==
Style magazine Tiatolo.bg described Anelia as the most stylish and the best dressed pop-folk singer of Bulgaria. Apart from other chalga starlets, Anelia's style is characterized by careful choice of accessories and not too heavy make-up. Anelia is known for her long, black hair which became her trademark. She was chosen a face for Pantene in 2005. In 2008 the singer constantly surprised the public by switching from the pastel-oriented girl next door to a more diva style. On the Pop-Folk Awards 2009 she showed up in visibly shorter hair. On most of her videos Anelia is wearing greyish-colour contact lenses. Her natural eye colour is dark brown.

== Personal life ==
In 2003 Anelia married the owner of the Vihren Sandanski Football Club Konstantin Dinev. However their marriage ended in divorce. One of the songs from Anelia's album "Единствен ти" describes break-up of the couple. The singer has one child, a girl named Ivon (born 29 December 2003). Her daughter was featured in the official video for the song "Продължавам" ( "I carry on") and her voice was recorded on the song "Не търси вината" (Don't seek guilt).

In July 2009, while driving her BMW SUV, Anelia had an accident on a highway to Burgas. Her car was severely damaged, yet the singer suffered only minor injuries and trauma.

== Album chart performance ==
Album	English translation	Peak position	Notes
Погледни ме в очите	Look me in the eyes	1	The best-selling album in Bulgaria for 2003
Не поглеждай назад	Don't look back	1	The best-selling album of Bulgarian female artist for 2004
Всичко води към теб	Everything leads to you	1	Released in 2005
Пепел от рози	Ash of roses	1	Released in 2006
Единствен ти	Only you	1	Released in 2008
Добрата, лошата	The good, the bad	1	Released in 2010
Игри за напреднали	Games for advanced	2	Released in 2011
Феноменална	Phenomenal	1	Released in 2014
Дай ми още	Give me more	1	The best-selling album in Bulgaria for 2018

== Discography ==
Studio albums
- 2002: Погледни ме в очите (Look into my eyes)
- 2004: Не поглеждай назад(Don't look back)
- 2005: Всичко води към теб (Everything leads to you)
- 2006: Пепел от рози (Ash of roses)
- 2008: Единствен ти(Only you)
- 2010: Добрата, лошата (The good, the bad)
- 2011: Игри за Напреднали(Games for advanced)
- 2014: Феноменална (Phenomenal)
- 2018: Дай ми още (Give me more)

== Trivia ==
- The previous president of Bulgaria, Georgi Parvanov is a fan of her music and has invited her to perform in many concerts.
- She is 173 cm tall.
- Before she raised to fame as a professional singer, she was singing in clubs in Switzerland.
- As a girl, she has trained rhythmic gymnastics.
- She has worked as a barwoman before her first recordings.
