= List of Bulgarian pop-folk singers =

This is a list of Bulgarian pop-folk singers.

== A ==
- Azis
- Andrea
- Anelia
- Antonina
- Alisia

== B ==
- Biser King
- Boni

== D ==
- Danna
- Desi Slava
- Debora
- Denis Teofikov
- Dessita
- Diona
- Dzhena
- Dzhina Stoeva
- Dzhia
- Dzhoanna

== E ==
- Emilia
- Emanuela
- Elena

== F ==
- Fiki Storaro

== G ==
- Galena
- Gergana
- Gloria
- Galin

== I ==
- Ivana
- Ivena

== K ==
- Kamelia
- Konstantin
- Krum
- Krisko-Driss

== M ==
- Malina
- Maria
- Milko Kalaidjiev

== P ==
- Preslava

== R ==
- Rayna
- Reni
- Roksana

== S ==
- Sofi Marinova
- Suzanitta
- Selma Ahmedova

== T ==
- Tanya Boeva
- Toni Storaro
- Tsvetelina
- Tsvetelina Yaneva
- Tedi Aleksandrova

== See also ==
- Bulgarian Pop-folk music
- Pop-folk
