= Fiki =

Bulgarian singer

Fiki Фики
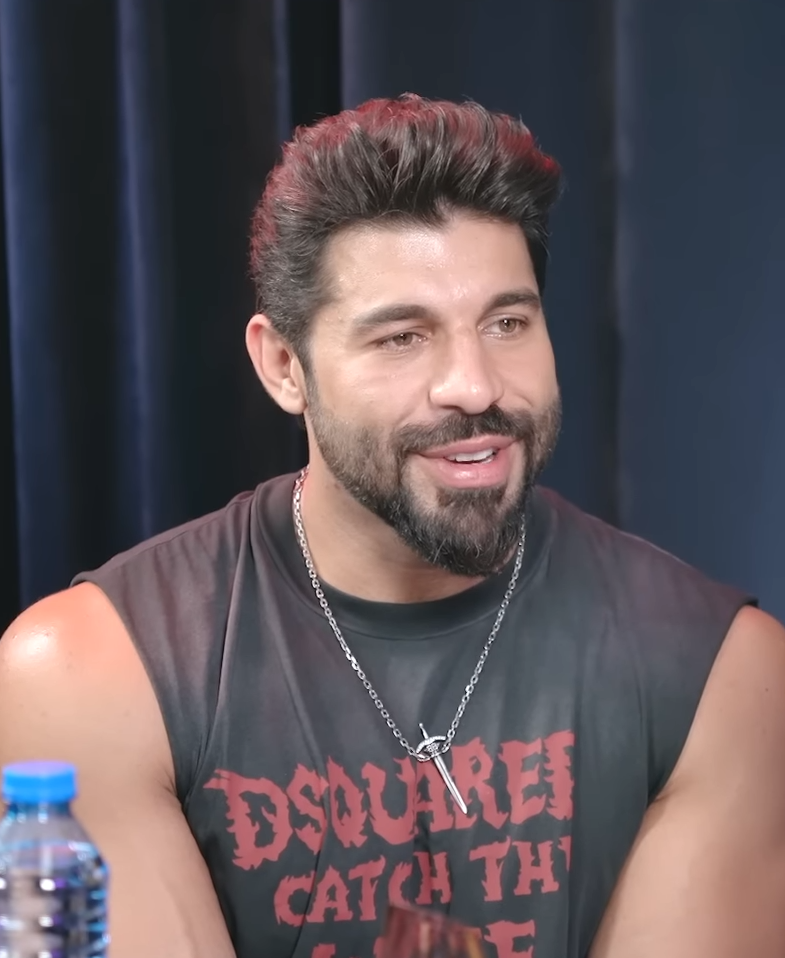
- Fiki in 2024

Background information
- Also known as: Fiki Storaro
- Born: Fikret Tuncher Ali; 3 March 1995 (age 31); Shumen, Bulgaria
- Genres: Pop; pop-folk; chalga
- Occupation: Singer
- Instrument: Vocals
- Years active: 2013–present
- Labels: Payner; Storaro Music
- Spouse: Guldzhan Stefanova (m. 2017)

Fikret Tuncher Ali (Bulgarian: Фикрет Тунчер Али, Turkish: Fikret Tunçer Ali; born 3 March 1995), better known under his stage name Fiki Storaro (Bulgarian: Фики Стораро) or simply Fiki, is a Bulgarian pop-folk singer. He is the son of singer Toni Storaro.

== Biography ==
Fiki was born in Shumen, Bulgaria. His father Toni Storaro is a popular Bulgarian singer. He is among the five Bulgarians selected for more than 110-member international choir Voices of Youth Music who participate in the opening of the 2012 Summer Olympics. In the casting he appeared with two songs of Stevie Wonder - "Lately" and "I Just Called to Say I Love You".

His first own song was a duet with his father Toni Storaro. The song is titled "Kazhi mi kato mazh" ("Tell Me Like a Man"). It was composed by Pantelis Pantelidis. In early October 2013, he released another new song, "Koy" ("Who") with Galena. Shortly after that, Fiki signed a contract with the company Payner and became a part of the music company. The song won the ranking of "Hit of 2013" by portal signal.bg. and "Duet Song of 2013" at the annual awards of the "Planeta TV"

The first solo song was released on 30 April 2014 titled "Beshe obich" ("There Was Love"). The title song topped Bulgarian Planet Top 20 chart in May. At the beginning of summer 2014 he released the song "Stiga" ("Enough") with popular music video director Lyudmil "Lyusi" Ilarionov. He embarked on a Planeta Summer 2014 tour for the first time to promote song. In October 2014, he was featured in a song by Tsvetelina Yaneva titled "Strah me e" ("I Am Afraid"). In the same month, he released the video for a second duet with Galena called "Bozhe, prosti" ("God, Forgive"). On 24 November 2014 Fiki release a new single "Gore-dolu" ("More or Less") featuring singer Preslava. The follow-up songs for the Christmas and New Year season were "Zaydi, zaydi" ("Set Down, Set Down") and "Yano, mori" ("Oh My Yana").

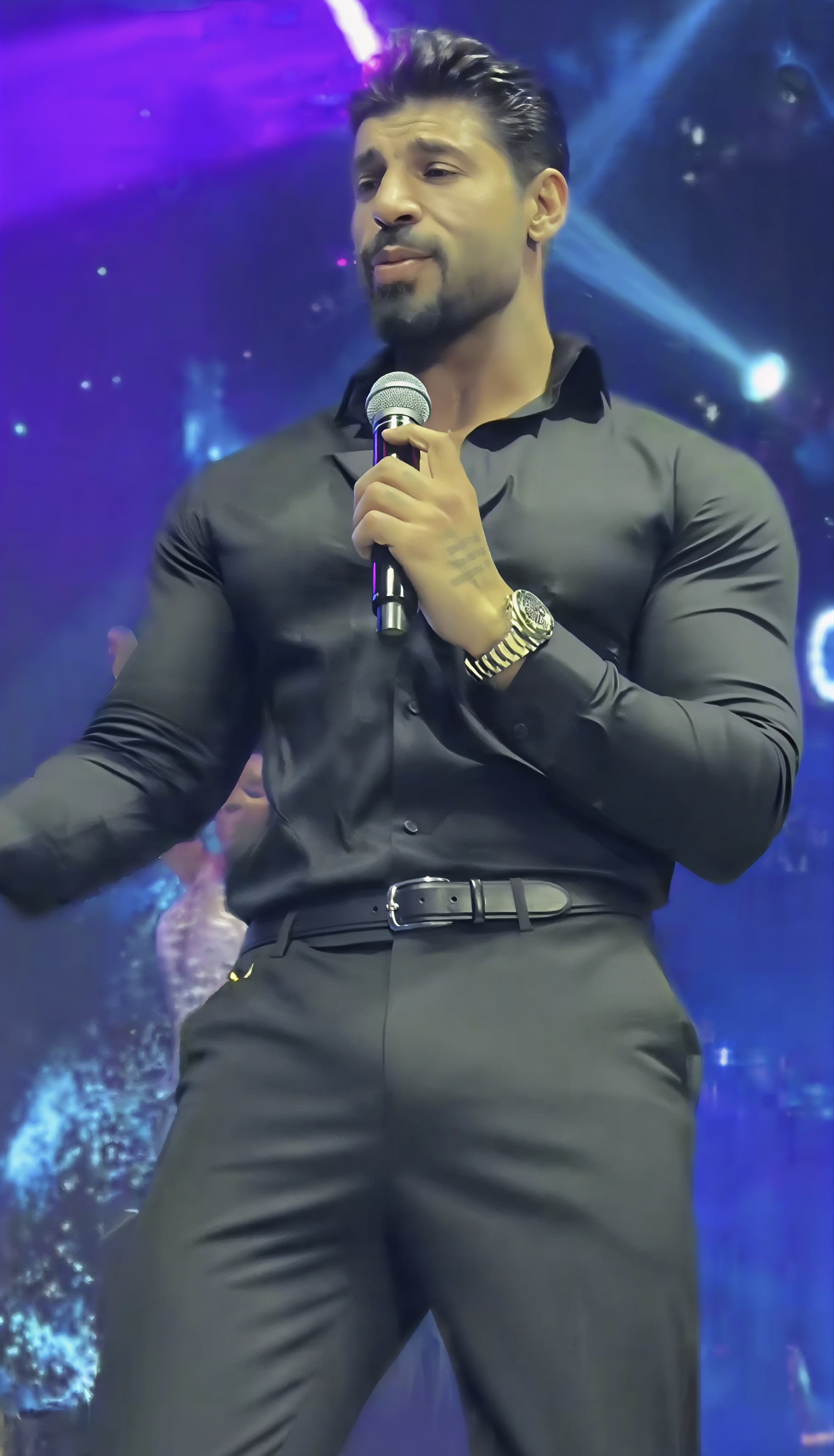
Fiki Storaro performing in a club in 2025

In 2015, he was featured on Kristiana's song "Moy dokray" ("Mine Forever"). On 20 April 2015, he released a balad "Dusha" ("Soul"), and in early summer that year "Bum" ("Boom"). He was also featured on "Seks z den" ("Sex for a Day") by Andrea. On 3 July 2015, he collaborated with Azis on the song "Blokiran" ("Blocked") followed by his own single "Zhelezen" ("Made of Iron") in September 2015.

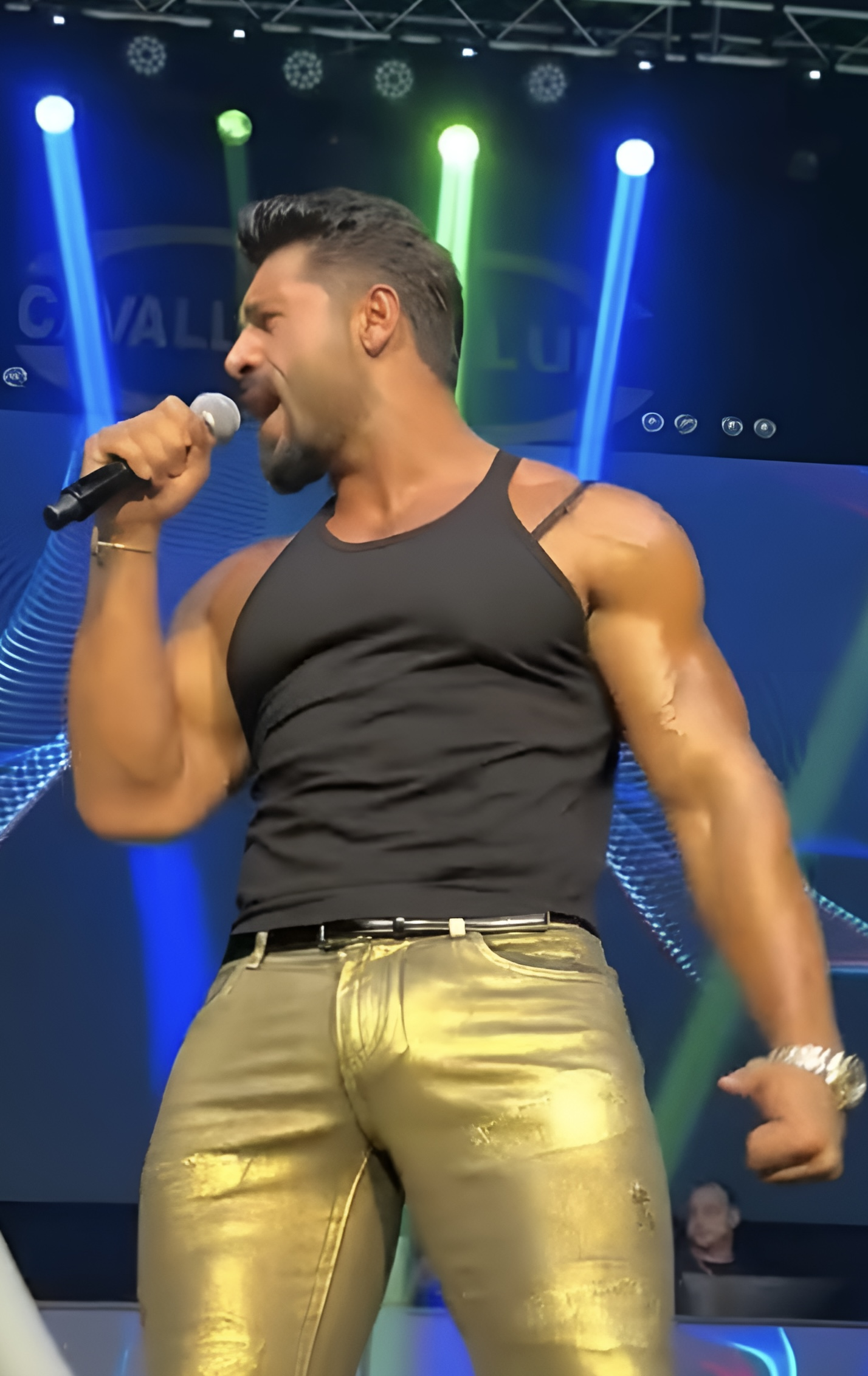
Fiki Storaro performing in a club in 2025

Fiki was awarded the special prize Fashion Idol during the annual 2015 Ball of the top models, organised by Evgeni Minchev. On 17 November 2015 he released the video for new song "Dzhale, dzhale" ("Djale Djale"). His last release of 2015 was "S teb ili s nikoy" ("With You or No One"), a Preslava release.

Fiki won Singer of the Year 2015 and Video Sensation of the Year awards during the Annual Planeta TV Awards.

In the same year, he released his debut album Is This Love, with three additional songs "Ti si mi sarceto" ("You Are My Heart"), "Tuk sam" ("I'm Here") and the title track, his first English-language song.

In 2017, he released "Ako iskash" ("If You Want") and "Pate" ("Duckling").

== Personal life ==
Fiki is of Turkish descent. In the autumn of 2017, Fiki married his girlfriend Guldzhan Stefanova, also of Turkish descent. They have a son and a daughter.

== Discography ==
- Is This Love (2016)
- 30 (2025)

=== Videos / Songs ===
Solo

- "Beshe Obich" ("Беше обич")
- "Stiga" ("Стига")
- "Dusha" ("Душа")
- "Bum" ("Бум")
- "Zhelezen" ("Железен")
- "Dzhale, Dzhale" ("Джале, джале")
- "Vertoleta" ("Вертолета")
- "Is This Love"
- "Ako iskash" ("Ако искаш")
- "Pate" ("Пате")
- "Az izmraznah" ("Аз измръзнах")
- "Otpusni se" ("Отпусни се")
- "Chupki v Krasta" ("Чупки в Кръста")
- "Vzemi se stegni" ("Вземи се стегни")
- "Mayko" ("Майко")
- "Chipi chipi" ("Чипи чипи")
- "Pali, pali" ("Пали, пали")
- "Lambo, bate" ("Ламбо, бате")
- "Cok guzel" ("Чок гюзел")
- "Zavisim" ("Зависим")
- "Telefona pravi tuut" ("Телефона прави туут")
- "Vlyubeniyat glupak" ("Влюбеният глупак")
- "Zlobari" ("Злобари")

Collaborations

- "Kazhi mi kato mazh" ("Кажи ми като мъж" (Fiki and Toni Storaro)
- "Koy" ("Кой") (Galena featuring Fiki)
- "Boje, Prosti" ("Боже, прости") (Galena and Fiki)
- "Gore-Dolu" ("Горе–долу") (Fiki featuring Preslava)
- "Blokiran" ("Блокиран") (Fiki and Azis)
- "S Teb Ili s Nikoy" ("С теб или с никой") (Preslava and Fiki)
- "S drug me barkash" ("С друг ме бъркаш") (Fiki featuring Galena)
- "Izneverish li mi" ("Изневериш ли ми") (Fiki and Galena)
- "Po muzhki" ("По мъжки") (Fiki and Haktan)
- "Lamborghini" ("Ламборгини") (Fiki i Galena)
- "Lyubovta e gadno neshto" ("Любовта е гадно нещо") (Fiki i Emrah)
- "Espanola Baby" ("Еспаньола бейби") (Fiki ft. Niki, Toni Storaro i Emrah)
- "Vamos vamos" ("Вамос вамос") (Fiki ft. Biser King)
- "Glasat na Sofia" ("Гласът на София") (Fiki ft. Sofi Marinova)
- "Sprechen Sie Deutsch" ("Говорите ли немски") (Fiki ft. Biser King)
- "Kazah "Ne" ("Казах "Не") (Fiki and Azis)
- "Tsveto" ("Цвето") (Fiki and Azis)
- "Zhivot moi" ("Живот мой") (Fiki and Galena)
- "Ne, ne, ne" ("Не, не, не") (Fiki ft. Galena)
- "Ya izgrei Slynce" ("Я изгрей Слънце") (Fiki and NSFA Shiroka Luka)
- "Beri mi mamo, grehove" ("Бери ми мамо, грехове") (Fiki, Petar Ralchev and Peyo Peev)
- "Lyzha e lyubovta" ("Лъжа е любовта") (Fiki and Emrah)
- "Egati matskata" ("Егати мацката") (Fiki ft. Sali Okka)
- "Do 100" ("До 100") (Fiki and Magi Djanavarova)
- "Mnogo si dobra" ("Много си добра") (Fiki ft. Costi)
- "Dame un grrr" (Fiki and Arap Jashari)
- "Evromilionera" ("Евромилионера") (Fiki and DJ Ceci Ludata Glava)
- "Ima li, nyama li" ("Има ли, няма ли") (Fiki and Azis)
- "Taktika" ("Тактика") (Fiki and Galin)
- "Tebe dokato ne te vidyah" ("Тебе докато не те видях") (Fiki ft. Emrah)
