= Tsvetelina Yaneva =

Tsvetelina Yaneva Цветелина Янева
- Born: Tsvetelina Georgieva Yaneva; 5 October 1989 (age 36); Plovdiv, Plovdiv Province, Bulgaria
- Genres: Pop folk; folk; pop
- Years active: 2008–present

Tsvetelina Georgieva Yaneva (Bulgarian: Цветелина Георгиева Янева; born 5 October 1989) is a Bulgarian singer in the pop-folk, pop and folk music genres.

== Biography ==
=== Early life ===
Yaneva was born on 5 October 1989 in Plovdiv. She follows in the footsteps of her parents; her father, Georgy Yanev, is a musician, and her mother, Pepa Yaneva, is a folk music singer. Her family lives in Plovdiv, but lived for a long time in Belashtitsa, 5 km (3.1 mi) from the city, where they have a house and a recording studio. Yaneva began her career from an early age, when she sang with an orchestra. As a child, She began to sing folk songs, but as a teenager she sang in the genre of pop and jazz music. She attended singing lessons at the local radio station Zaduma of the local trade union in her hometown.

=== 2008-2012: Early career and first successes ===
In mid-2008, Tsvetelina signed a contract with the record company Payner. In July of the same year, she released a video clip for the song "Otkradnata Lyubov" (Stolen Love). In early 2009, she released a video clip for the song "Tri Minut" (Three Minutes). In April of the same year, she released a video clip for the song "Avtorŭt e drug" (The Author is Completely Different). In September of the same year, she released another video for the song Kato virus (Like a virus). In June 2010, Tsvetelina Yaneva sang the song Momiche za vsichko (Russian servant for everything) at the anniversary concert of the Payner company. In October, on her birthday, the singer presented her debut album Na parvo miasto (In first place) at the Sin City club. In early 2011, she released a video clip Kakvo pravim sega (What we are doing now) with singer Maria, this is her first duet song. In 2012, she released her second album Moga pack (I can again) on St. Nicholas Day.

=== 2013 - present: New album and duets ===
On 11 June 2015, at a concert on the occasion of the 25th anniversary of the Payner company, Tsvetelina, together with Preslava, Emilia, Desi Slava, Galena and Anelia, presented a new version of the popular folk song Lale li si, zumbul li si, and on 9 July she released a video for this song. Before Christmas and New Year, Tsvetelina, together with Galena and Galin, presented the song Koleda (Christmas). In 2016, Tsvetelina released a new duet song Pey sirtse (The Heart Sings) together with Galena with the participation of Azis, which topped all pop-folk charts.

In early 2017, Yaneva promoted her new project entitled "Kill Me". In 2018, she released four songs "It was a mistake" in a duet with Denis Teofikov, "Marrakesh" in a duet with Galena, "The end with me" and "Congratulations". In Summer 2019, "My Pain" was released. Two more songs "Don't Leave Me", in a duet with Fiki, and "The Angel" were also released. Towards the end of September 2020, Yaneva released the song "The Minutes" in a duet with the debutant Alexander Robov. She started 2021 with "Fight, fight". On December 26, the song "Film for Us" was released, which was a duet with Medi.

== Personal life ==
Yaneva is in a relationship with politician Delyan Peevski. In July 2017, she became a mother, gave birth to a boy, his name is still unknown, and during pregnancy, she hid this news from fans and the media.

== Discography ==
=== Studio albums ===
- Na pârvo mjasto (На първо място, 2010)
- Dâšterja na pesenta (Дъщеря на песента, 2012)
- Moga pak (МОГА ПАК, 2012)
