= Dzhena =

Djena Джена
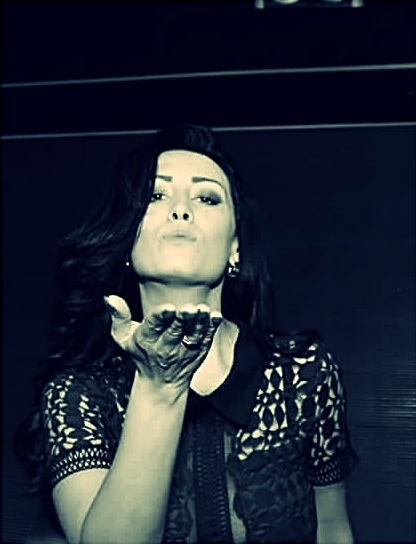

Background information
- Also known as: Dzhena Valentinova Nedelcheva-Stoeva
- Born: Desislava Valentinova Nedelcheva; 3 July 1985 (age 41); Razgrad, Bulgaria
- Genres: Pop-folk; folk; dance-pop
- Years active: 2006–present
- Labels: Leo Music; Payner
- Spouse: Atanas Stoev Jr. (m. 2016)

Dzhena Valentinova Nedelcheva-Stoeva (Note: Bulgarian: Джена Валентинова Неделчева-Стоева) (born Desislava Valentinova Nedelcheva; (Note: Bulgarian: Десислава Валентинова Неделчева) on 3 July 1985), better known simply as Djena, (Note: Bulgarian: Джена, romanized: Dzhena) is a Bulgarian pop-folk and folk singer.

== Biography ==
Desislava Valentinova Nedelcheva was born in Razgrad on 3 July 1985. She has an elder sister Borislava. In 2006 she signed a one-year contract with Azis's company Leo Music. Initially, Nedelcheva began performing under the moniker "Nova Desislava" (Bulgarian: Нова Десислава, lit. 'New Desislava'), but in 2007 finally began performing as Djena. At the beginning of 2007, her colleague Milko Kalaydzhiev encouraged her to sign a contract with the company Payner and the contract took place on 16 March 2007. In the same year she released first album Greshni misli (Wrong Thoughts). In the same year she took part in one of the most prestigious festivals in Bulgaria, Pirin Folk, where she won first prize for performing arts with the song "Pesen za Dame Voyvoda" (Song for Voivode Dame) written and composed by herself. In 2011, Djena went on US tour. She held concerts for the Bulgarian diaspora. Djena received special Fashion Idol Award in 2015. In 2018, she released a folk album in collaboration with Kanarite Orchestra.

== Personal life ==
In December 2015, she got engaged to Atanas Stoev Jr., marrying him on her birthday, 3 July 2016. In March 2017, Dzhena gave birth to a baby boy, Atanas Stoev III.

== Awards ==
Planeta TV Awards

- 2007: Debut of the year
- 2008: Ambassador of Bulgarian music abroad
- 2014: The Song of the Year Моли се да не почна
- 2016: Original presence of club scene
- 2016: Ambassador of Bulgarian music abroad

== Discography ==
=== Albums ===
Studio albums

- 2008 — Грешни мисли (Sinful thoughts)
- 2010 — Не знаеш коя съм (You don't know who I am)
- 2012 — Да видя какво е (To see what it is)
- 2014 — Моли се да не почна (Pray wasn't started)
- 2017 — Срещна ни хорото (with Kanarite Orchestra, We met the dance)
- 2017 — Да ти бъда корона (Let me be your crown)
- 2021 — Чуй ме (Listen to me)
- 2025 — Не е любов (It isn't love)

Compilations

- 2009 Jenna The best selection
- 2013 Златните хитове на Джена (Golden hits of Zhena)

=== Videos / Songs ===
- From album Грешни мисли
  - 2007: Грешни мисли
  - 2007: Химия
  - 2008: Слепи бяхме (with Ilian)
  - 2008: Луд и съвършен
- From album Не знаеш коя съм
  - 2008: Омръзна ми (remix - with DJ Zhivko Mix)
  - 2008: Ще те спечеля
  - 2009: Кой си ти
  - 2009: Случайна среща
  - 2009: Чуждите и лесните
  - 2010: Не ставаш
- From album Да видя какво е
  - 2010: С повече от две
  - 2010: Стойки не чупи
  - 2010: Всичко давам да си тук
  - 2011: Да се влюбя, не допускам
  - 2011: Да те прежаля (with Andreas)
  - 2011: Да те бях ранила
  - 2012: Обичам те и толкова
  - 2012: Да видя какво е
- From album Моли се да не почна
  - 2013: Истината
  - 2013: Кой ме събра с тебе
  - 2013: Как не се уморих
  - 2013: Пий едно от мене (with Andrea)
  - 2014: Моли се да не почна
  - 2014: Неверници
  - 2014: Да ти се доказвам
  - 2014: Моята награда
- From album Да ти бъда корона
  - 2015: Спри да ми досаждаш
  - 2015: Градът работи за мен
  - 2015: Ти къде беше
  - 2016: Всичко знаеш
  - 2016: Дразни ме пак
  - 2016: Зависима
  - 2017: Коя
  - 2017: Тук жена му пази (with Preslava)
  - 2017: Да ти бъда корона
- From album Чуй ме
  - 2018: Диагноза - Ти
  - 2018: Хулиган
  - 2018: Не слагай от отровата (with Andreas)
  - 2018: Яко ми е
  - 2019: Горкото момиче
  - 2019: Вижте го, жени
  - 2019: Достойната
  - 2020: Шот за болката
  - 2021: Чуй ме
  - 2021: Моят номер
  - 2021: Нощите на теб ми ухаят
- From album Не е любов
  - 2022: Пияни нощи
  - 2022: Не съм жена ти
  - 2023: Сърце от лего
  - 2023: Две очи / Dio matia (with Sofia Danezi)
  - 2023: Има ли рожденик
  - 2023: Не е любов
  - 2024: Не се извинявам
  - 2024: По-полека (with Djordan)
  - 2024: Откачено влюбени
  - 2024: Как боли
  - 2025: Не излезе човек
  - 2025: Хулигани (featuring Djordan)
  - 2025: Фамилията ти
  - 2025: Седем милиарда
- Various
  - 2006: Не ме е грижа
  - 2010: Къде е пичът
  - 2021: Да си траят (with Tita)
  - 2023: Аз и ти (with Simona)
  - 2025: Празнуваш (with Desi Slava)
  - 2026: Ненормална
  - 2026: Пази Ви България (with Kanar Bend)
  - 2026: Такива като тебе (with Kanar Bend)
  - 2026: Бандит
