= Ivana (singer) =

Bulgarian singer (born 1969)

Ivana Ивана
- Born: Vanya Todorova Kaludova; 31 January 1969 (age 57); Aytos, Bulgaria
- Genres: Pop Folk, Folklore, Balkan Pop, Dance Pop
- Occupation: singer
- Instrument: Guitar
- Years active: 1999–present
- Label: Payner
- Website: ivanamusic.bg

Vanya Todorova Kaludova (Bulgarian: Ваня Тодорова Калудова; born 31 January 1969), known professionally as Ivana (Bulgarian: Ивана), is a popular Bulgarian singer. She is one of the most prolific performers in the pop-folk music genre in Bulgaria.

== Biography ==
Ivana was born on January 31, 1969, in Aytos, Bulgaria. A Svishtov University of Economics graduate, she then briefly studied at the Bourgas Free University, before dropping out. Meanwhile, Ivana was married and had a daughter named Teodora (Теодора).

== Career ==
Ivana's father worked along the Black Sea coast with his orchestra. One night during a concert, after their lead singer had gotten sick, she was offered to substitute for her, singing several Bulgarian folklore songs. Ivana had great response from the audience and she was immediately offered to perform with the orchestra for the summer. She was 14 years old at the time and really liked being on stage. Later on she formed a band called "Prima +", consisting of herself, Stoyana and Rumen Radoinov. The group was invited to sing at the hotel estate `Prikazkite`, where Ivana’s talent was noticed by Payner music company owner – Mitko Dimitrov (Bulgarian: Митко Димитров), who shortly after offered her to sign a contract with the studio. Vanya Todorova Kaludova adopted the stage name Ivana and it didn't take long before she started making hits. Her first single was `Idol`. The second single - a duet with Kosta Markov, called `Darvo bez koren`(A tree without roots) - was released soon after. Her third single – `100 patrona` (100 bullets), which also served as her debut album title, became one of the biggest hits in the pop-folk genre in Bulgaria and still one of the biggest hits in pop-folk to date. The album was released in 2000, making her one of the hottest names in the music industry in the country. The following 8 years with her work and hits Ivana proved to be one of the biggest Bulgarian stars. Often cited "the people's singer" by the media and her fans, she is loved by many, not only for her music, but also for her cheerful persona and easy communication with her fans.

== Discography ==
CDs

- A Hundred Bullets (in Bulgarian – 100 патрона) (2000)
- Ivana – Live (in Bulgarian – Ивана – Live) (2001)
- Smells of... love (in Bulgarian -Мирише на... любов) (2003)
- No limits (in Bulgarian -Без Граници) (2003)
- Non-stop (in Bulgarian – Няма спиране) (2004)
- A Dose of love (in Bulgarian – Доза любов) (2005)
- Single best collection (2006)
- Every day is a celebration (in Bulgarian – Празник всеки ден) (2006)
- Hit collection – MP3 (2007)
- A Sparkle in the eyes (in Bulgarian – Блясък в очите) (2008)
- 10 years of love... and then some more love (in Bulgarian – 10 години любов... и пак любов) (2010)
- I Give no explanations (in Bulgarian – Обяснения не давам) (2012)
- Golden hits of Payner 2 – Ivana (in Bulgarian – Златните хитове на Пайнер 2 – Ивана) (2012)
- I won't let us give up (in Bulgarian – Не давам да се даваме) (2015)
- Still the same, yet not quite (in Bulgarian – Същата и не съвсем) (2019)

DVDs

- Ivana – Live (in Bulgarian – Ивана – Live) (2002)
- No limits (in Bulgarian – Без Граници) (2004)
- Ivana Best Video Selection 1 (2005)
- Stars on the stage-live(in Bulgarian -Звезди на сцената-live) (2005)-A concert with the Serbian singer Indira Radić
- Ivana Best Video Selection 2 (2007)
- Everything is love (in Bulgarian -Всичко е любов) (2008)
- Ivana Live Party (2008)

== Awards ==
- 2000 – Debut of the year – The musical awards of "Нов фолк" magazine
- 2001 – Best Female Singer – The musical awards of "Нов фолк" magazine
- 2002 – Best live singing – The musical awards of "Нов фолк" magazine
- 2003 – Best live singing – The musical awards of "Нов фолк" magazine
- 2003 – Best song of the year – The musical awards of "Нов фолк" magazine
- 2003 – Best Female Singer – Planeta TV Awards
- 2004 – Best clip (Нещо НеТипично (Something atypical)) – Planeta TV Awards
- 2004 – Most loved song of the audience – Planeta TV Awards
- 2004 – Best Female Singer – The musical awards of "Нов фолк" magazine
- 2004 – Best Female Singer – Planeta TV Awards
- 2005 – "Star of the year" – The awards of "Блясък" magazine
- 2005 – Best live singing – The musical awards of "Нов фолк" magazine
- 2005 – Album of the year(Няма спиране(Non-stop)) – Planeta TV Awards
- 2005 – Best Female Singer – The musical awards of "Нов фолк" magazine
- 2005 – Best Female Singer – Planeta TV Awards
- 2006 – Best Female Singer – The musical awards of "Нов фолк" magazine
- 2006 – Best Female Singer – Planeta TV Awards
- 2007 – Album of the year(Доза любов(Dose of love)) – Planeta TV Awards
- 2007 – Superstar(A special award for the best singer in the last 5 years) – Planeta TV Awards
- 2008 – Album of the year(Празник всеки ден(Every day is a holiday)) – Planeta TV Awards
- 2010– The best singer for last 10 years

== Tours ==
In 2005 Ivana and Serbian singer Indira Radić embarked on a mini-tour, performing in 5 Bulgarian cities to great success. She sang her newest and older hits, traditional Bulgarian folk songs and duets with Indira Radić.

In 2005, 2006 and 2007 Ivana toured with 8 other famous Bulgarian singers - including Kamelia, Emilia, Maria, etc - for the Planeta TV and Payner national tours.

"Ivana LIVE Tour USA 2008" took place in Atlantic city, New York, Atlanta, Las Vegas, Tampa, Chicago and Washington. She held seven concerts for the Bulgarians living in the USA.
