= Azis =

Bulgarian singer (born 1978)

Azis Азис
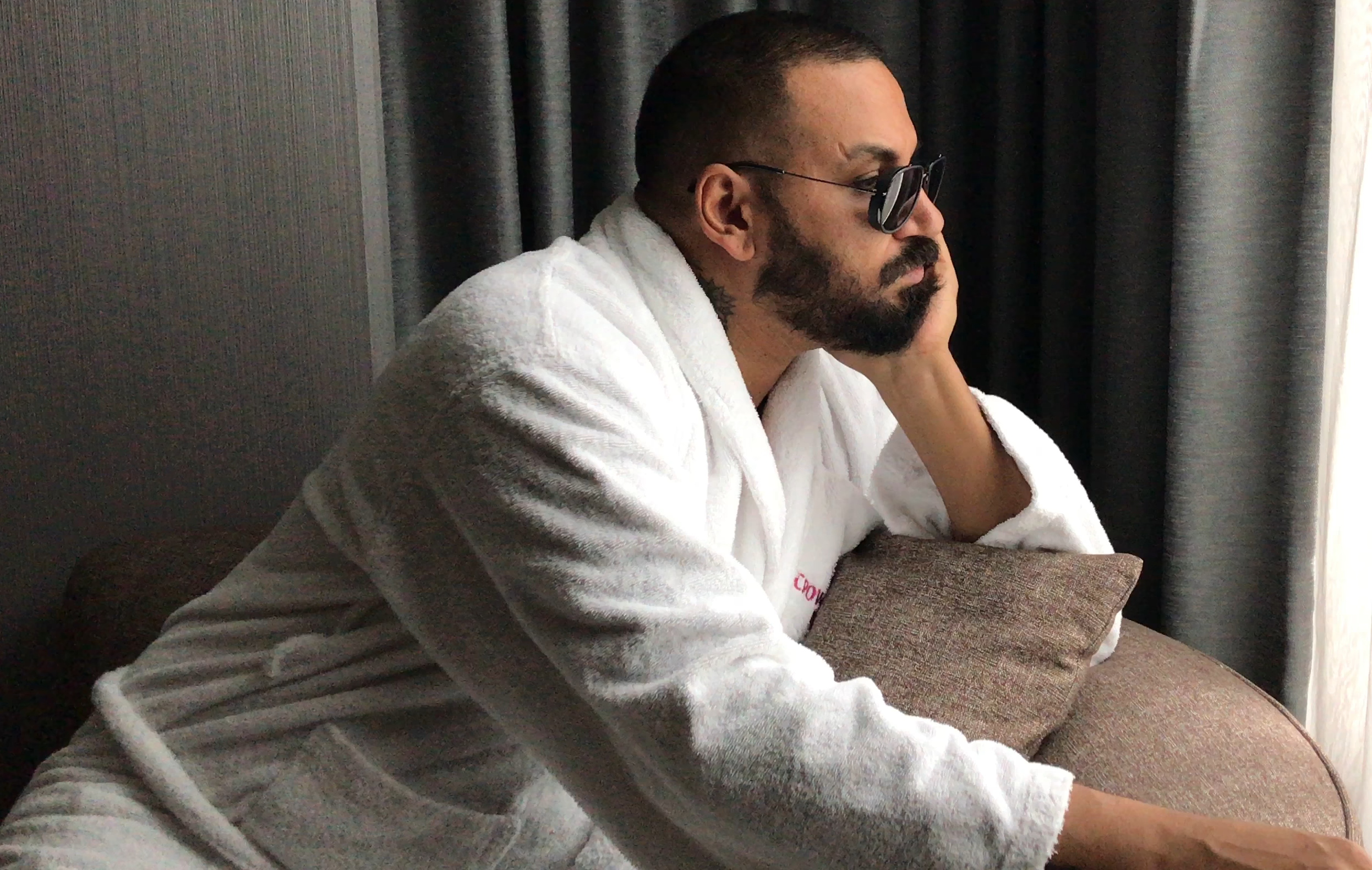
- Azis in 2018

Background information
- Born: Vasil Troyanov Boyanov; 7 March 1978 (age 48); Sliven, Bulgaria
- Genres: Chalga; pop-folk
- Occupations: Singer; songwriter; activist; TV host
- Instruments: Vocals
- Years active: 1999–present
- Labels: Sunny Music; Payner; Ara Audio-Video; Diapason Records
- Spouse(s): Niki Kitaetsa (m. 2006; sep. 2008) Unknown man (m. 2026)

Vasil Troyanov Boyanov (Bulgarian: Васил Троянов Боянов; born 7 March 1978), professionally known as Azis (Bulgarian: Азис), is a Bulgarian Romani singer and songwriter. Widely known as the "King of Pop-Folk", Azis initially rose to prominence in the Balkans and Eastern Europe performing mostly chalga, a Bulgarian version of pop-folk. Azis has collaborated with other Bulgarian pop-folk singers such as Gloria, Malina, Sofi Marinova, Galena, Preslava, Toni Storaro, and Bulgarian rap artists Ustata and Vanko 1. His repertoire also includes duets with singers from the former Yugoslavia, including Indira Radić, Marta Savić, Jelena Karleuša, Severina and Tea Tairović.

Boyanov performed "Let Me Cry" at the Eurovision Song Contest 2006, as the backing vocalist of Mariana Popova, not qualifying from the semi-final. Other than his acclaimed career as a vocalist, he ran unsuccessfully in the 2005 Bulgarian parliamentary election as a member of the Euroroma party. Azis remains a prominent figure in the Bulgarian music scene.

== Biography ==
=== Early life ===
Vasil Troyanov Boyanov was born into a modest Roma family in Sliven, Bulgaria. He spent his childhood in Kostinbrod and Sofia. In 1990, after the fall of communism in Bulgaria, he moved with his family to Germany. There, his sister, Matilda, and brother, Ryan, were born.

=== Career ===
In 2007, Azis and Kitaetsa appeared in the VIP Brother 2 edition of Big Brother Bulgaria. Azis left the house voluntarily after nineteen days. In late November 2007, Boyko Borisov, then mayor of Sofia, censored billboards of Azis kissing Niki Kitaetsa, which pictured both men shirtless on the basis they were too graphic in nature. The picture was then censored in other cities in Bulgaria.

Azis was interviewed in the second episode of Michael Palin's New Europe.

In 2008 on PRO.BG, Azis co-hosted the talk show Azis' Late Night Show with actress Ekaterina Evro.

In 2011, Azis released the single "Sen Trope". It achieved significant popularity throughout the Balkans and inspired several adaptations and covers by artists in the region, including "Fotia me Fotia" by Greek laïko singer Panos Kiamos, "Saint Tropez" by Romanian manele singer Florin Salam, and "Ona to zna" by Serbian turbo-folk singer Dragan Kojić Keba.

In August 2012, Anonymous used the video clip to Azis' song "Mrazish" to deface the website of the Russian court Khamovnichesky, where the members of the band Pussy Riot were convicted. In November 2012, the Greek singer Giorgos Tsalikis made a cover of Azis' song "Hop", entitled "Asto" (Let it).

Azis was a contestant on the widely popular reality show Kato dve kapki voda, which is the Bulgarian version of Your Face Sounds Familiar. After twelve weeks and a wide specter of highly praised and enjoyed performances, he placed second. In early 2021, he was announced as one of the returning participants in the forthcoming ninth All Stars season of the show.

In 2021, Azis was scheduled to perform at the Balkan Fair in Kestel, Bursa, Turkey, but the performance was cancelled after a campaign by Islamists targeting Azis' LGBT identity.

== Personal life ==
Azis is gay. He married Nikolay "Niki Kitaetsa" Petrov Parvanov on 1 October 2006. Their marriage was not legally recognized under Bulgarian law. Azis' daughter was born on 5 August 2007 and was named Raya. Her mother is Azis' longtime friend, Gala. In 2008, Azis and Parvanov separated amicably. In 2026 he married an undisclosed man in the United States.

== Books ==
- Аз, Азис (Book and CD) (2006)

== Discography ==
=== Studio albums ===
Year	Original title	Transliteration	Meaning in English
1999	Болка	Bolka	Pain
2000	Мъжете също плачат	Mazhete sashto plachat	Men also cry
2001	Сълзи	Salzi	Tears
2002	AZIS	Azis	AZIS
2003	На голо	Na golo	In the nude
2004	Кралят	Kralyat	The King
2004	Together- Заедно с Деси Слава	Together- Zaedno s Desi Slava	Together (with Desi Slava)
2005	AZIS 2005	Azis 2005	AZIS 2005
2006	Дива	Diva	Diva
2011	Гадна порода	Gadna Poroda	Nasty breed
2014	Azis 2014	Azis 2014	Azis 2014

=== Compilation albums ===
Year	Original title	Transliteration	Meaning in English
2002	The Best		
2005	Дуети	Dueti	Duets
2005	The Best 2		
2025	Azis Hit Collection		

=== EPs (maxi singles) ===
Year	Original title	Transliteration	Meaning in English
2003	Целувай ме+	Tseluvay me+	Kiss me+
2004	Как боли	Kak boli	How it hurts
2016	Хабиби	Habibi	Habibi

=== Videography / songs ===
Year	Original title	Transliteration	Translation
1999	"Болка"	Bolka	Pain
1999	"Автомонтьор"	Avtomontyor	Auto mechanic
2000	"Мъжете също плачат"	Mazhete sashto plachat	Men cry too
2001	"Хвани ме де"	Hvani me de	Catch me
2001	"Обичам те"	Obicham te	I love you
2002	"Няма"	Nyama	I won't
2002	"Делник и празник" (дует с Кали)	Delnik i praznik	Weekday and weekend (with Kali)
2002	"Дай ми го дай"	Day mi go day	Give it to me
2003	"Всеки път"	Vseki pat	Every time
2003	"Никой не може"	Nikoy ne mozhe	No one can
2003	"Целувай ме"	Tseluvay me	Kiss me
2004	"Как боли"	Kak boli	How it hurts
2004	"Хайде почвай ме"	Hayde pochvay me	Let me soil
2004	"Не сме безгрешни" (дует с Глория)	Ne sme bezgreshni	We're not sinless (with Gloria)
2004	"Казваш, че ме обичаш" (дует с Деси Слава)	Kazvash, che me obichash	You say that you love me (with Desi Slava)
2004	"Но казвам ти стига"	No kazvam ti stiga	But I'm telling you to stop
2004	"Ледена кралица"	Ledena kralitsa	Ice Queen
2004	"Жадувам"	Zhaduvam	Crave
2005	"Обречи ме на любов"	Obrechi me na lyubov	Condemn me to love
2005	"Точно сега" (дует с Устата)	Tochno sega	Right now (with Ustata)
2005	"Верността е лъжа" (дует с Марта Савич)	Vernostta e lazha	Devotion is a lie (with Marta Savić)
2005	"Не знаеш" (дует с Малина)	Ne znaesh	You don't know (with Malina)
2005	"Като скитница"	Kato skitnitsa	Like a Wanderer
2006	"Празнуваш ли сега"	Praznuvash li sega	Are you celebrating now
2006	"Черните очи" (дует с Малина)	Chernite ochi	The black eyes (with Malina)
2006	"Тежко ли ти е"	Tezhko li ti e	Is it hard for you
2007	"Подлудяваш ме"	Podludyavash me	You drive me crazy
2009	"Теб обичам"	Teb obicham	Loving you
2009	"Накарай ме"	Nakaray me	Make me
2009	"Имаш ли сърце"	Imash li sartse	Do you have a heart
2010	"Дай ми лед"	Day mi led	Give me ice
2010	"Луд ме правиш" (дует с Ванко 1)	Lud me pravish	You make me crazy (with Vanko 1)
2010	"Удряй ме"	Udryay me	Hit me
2011	"Няма накъде"	Nyama nakade	Nowhere
2011	"Мразиш"	Mrazish	Hate
2011	"Гадна порода"	Gadna poroda	Nasty breed
2011	"Хоп"	Hop	Hop
2011	"Mama"	—	Mum
2011	"Сен Тропе"	Sen Trope	Saint-Tropez
2012	"MMA"	—	—
2012	"Кажи честно"	Kazhi chestno	Tell me honestly
2012	"Пробвай се" (дует с Андреа)	Probvay se	Give it a try (feat. Andrea)
2012	"Ти за мен си само секс"	Ti za men si samo seks	You're just sex for me
2012	"Коледа"	Koleda	Christmas
2012	"Нещо мръсно"	Neshto mrasno	Something dirty
2013	"Евала"	Evala	Well done
2013	"Хайде на морето"	Hayde na moreto	Let's go to the sea
2013	"Ти ме размаза"	Ti me razmaza	You crushed me
2013	"Като тебе втори няма" (дует с Ванко 1)	Kato tebe vtori nyama	There's nobody like you (with Vanko 1)
2014	"Ти ли си" (дует с Ваня)	Ti li si	Is it you (with Vanya)
2014	"Пий цяла нощ"	Piy tsyala nosht	Drink all night
2014	"Колко сме пили" (with Тони Стораро)	Kolko sme pili	How much we drank (with Toni Storaro)
2014	"Миконос"	Mykonos	—
2014	"Каза ли го" (дует с Мария)	Kaza li go (with Maria)	did you say it (with Maria)
2014	"Estar Loco" (with Giorgos Tsalikis)	—	To be crazy (Giorgos Tsalikis)
2014	"Чуй ме" (дует с Мария)	Chuy me	Hear me (with Maria)
2015	"Джанъм, джанъм"	Canım, canım	Darling, darling
2015	"Моля те не ми звъни" (дует с Мария)	Molya te ne mi zvani	Please don't call me (with Maria)
2015	"Блокиран" (дует с Фики)	Blokiran	Blocked (with Fiki)
2015	"Хабиби"	Habibi	Habibi
2017	"Мотел"	Motel	Motel
2018	"Позна ли ме?"	Pozna li me?	Did you recognize me?
2019	"Жено, бягай"	Zheno, byagai	Run, woman
2019	"Циганче"	Ciganche	Gypsy kid
2020	"Who cares?"	—	—
2020	"Сагапо"	Sagapo	I love you
2020	"Тясно"	Tyasno	Narrow
2022	"Fališ mi"	—	I miss you
2022	"Пистолет"	Pistolet	Pistol
2022	"Airport"	Airport	Airport
2023	"Мой си бе"	Moy si be	Boy, you are mine
2023	"По, По, По"	Po, Po, Po	Better, Better, Better
2024	"Казах "не"	Kazah "ne"	I said "no"
2024	"Лудница"	Ludnitsa	Madhouse
2024	"Диаманти и пари"	Diamanti i pari	Diamonds and money
2024	"Хубавица"	Hubavitsa	Pretty woman
2024	"Katastrofa"	—	Disaster
2024	"Мръсница"	Mrusnitsa	Slut
2024	"Хубаво ли ти е"	Hubavo li ti e	Are you feeling well?
2024	"Пак ми звъниш"	Pak mi zvynish	You are calling me again
2025	"Тази дискотека"	Tazi diskoteka	This discotheque
2025	"Кой бе, кой"	Koy be, koy	Who, damn it?
2025	"Полуживи"	Poluzhivi	Half-alives
2026	"Хавте"	Havte	—
2026	"Има ли, няма ли"	Ima li, nyama li	Is there, is there not?
2026	"Картечница"	Kartechnitsa	Machine gun
2026	"Мангава ту"	Mangava tu	I love you

=== DVDs ===
- 2003: Шоу спектакъл
- 2004: Нищо лично
- 2004: The best videoclips
- 2004: Together with Desi Slava
- 2005: AZIS 2005
- 2005: Дуети (Duets)
- 2006: Аз, Азис ( I, Azis) (CD)
- 2007: Azis

=== Collaborations ===
List of non-single guest appearances, with other performing artists, showing year released and album name
Title	Year	Artist(s)	Album
"Sezam"	2011	Indira Radić	Istok, sever, jug i zapad
"Mama"	2012	Marta Savić	13
"Fališ mi"	2022	Severina	
"Katastrofa"	2024	Tea Tairović	
