= Denis Teofikov =

Denis Teofikov Денис Теофиков
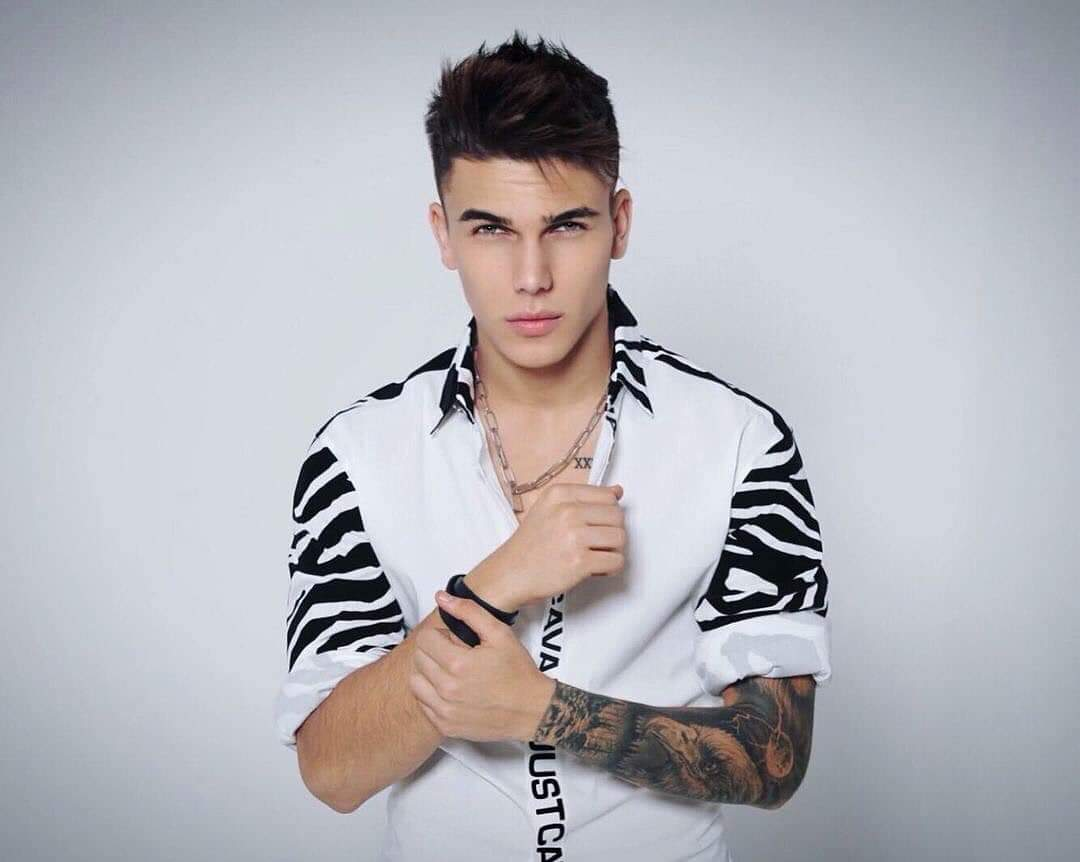

Background information
- Born: Denis Ateshkhan Yuseinov; July 20, 2000; Sofia, Bulgaria
- Died: October 24, 2021 (aged 21) Sofia, Bulgaria
- Occupation: musician
- Years active: 2018–2021
- Labels: Payner, Diamond Beat Production

Denis Ateshkhan Teofikov (in Bulgarian: Денис Атешхан Теофиков; 20 July 2000 — 24 October 2021), better known simply as Denis Teofikov (Bulgarian: Денис Теофиков), was a Bulgarian pop folk singer. He had been called the "Bulgarian Justin Bieber" because of his resemblance to the Canadian singer.

== Biography and creativity ==
He was born on 20 July 2000 in Sofia. He grew up in a musical family — his mother, Venera, is a singer, and his father, Ateshkhan Teofikov, is a famous jazz guitarist. He completed his education at the Lyubomir Pipkov National Music School in Sofia. He participated in some of the biggest musical reality formats in Bulgaria — Balgariya tarsi talant and The X Factor. In 2018, he signed a contract with the Payner music company. The success of his debut duet "Грешка беше" with Tsvetelina Yaneva gave a flying start to the singer's professional career. His second project — the ballad "Мило мое" and the subsequent duets with Emilia — "Акула" and "Тръгвай си", confirmed his growing popularity and turned him into one of the new teen idols. In a short time, Denis Teofikov participated in one of Julia's projects and recorded three duets with Malkata — "Полудяваш", "И това ще отмине" and "Локдаун". The artist had joint projects with Anelia — "Милион", with Cvetelina Grahić — "Пак ще го направя", as well as a joint piece with Malkata, Alexander Robov and Cvetelina Grahić — "Не се отказват".

In 2016, he starred in the movie Monkey (Маймуна).

== Death ==
In the early morning hours of 24 October 2021 Denis committed suicide by jumping from the seventh floor of his apartment building. He was 21 years old. His funeral was held on 29 October with many Bulgarian popfolk singers paying tribute to him. He was buried at the Central Sofia Cemetery on the same day.

== Discography ==
He had recorded 14 songs with a total of over 157 million views on YouTube.

=== Songs ===
Year	Song	Produced by	Arranged by	Lyrics	Views on YouTube
2018	Грешка беше (a duo with Tsvetelina Yaneva)	Diamond Beat Production	Diamond Beat Production	Anastasia Mavrodieva and Rosen Dimitrov	23M
2018	Мило мое	Diamond Beat Production	Diamond Beat Production	Anastasia Mavrodieva and Diamond Beat Production	12M
2019	Акула (duo with Emilia)	Diamond Beat Production	Diamond Beat Production	Anastasia Mavrodieva and Diamond Beat Production	14M
2019	Тръгвай си (duo with Emilia)	Diamond Beat Production	Diamond Beat Production	Anastasia Mavrodieva and Diamond Beat Production	16M
2019	Катастрофа	Diamond Beat Production	Diamond Beat Production	Anastasia Mavrodieva and Diamond Beat Production	10M
2019	Полудяваш (duo with Malkata)	Diamond Beat Production	Diamond Beat Production	Anastasia Mavrodieva and Diamond Beat Production	13M
2020	И това ще отмине (duo with Malkata)	Diamond Beat Production	Diamond Beat Production	Anastasia Mavrodieva and Diamond Beat Production	15M
2020	Не се отказват (quartet with Malkata, Alexander Robov and Cvetelina Grahić)	Diamond Beat Production	Diamond Beat Production	Anastasia Mavrodieva and Diamond Beat Production	14M
2020	Милион (duo with Anelia)	Diamond Beat Production	Diamond Beat Production	Diamond Beat Production and Alen Milev	13M
2020	Пак ще го направя (duo with Cvetelina Grahić)	Diamond Beat Production	Diamond Beat Production	Anastasia Mavrodieva and Diamond Beat Production	9M
2020	Локдаун (duo with Malkata)	Diamond Beat Production	Diamond Beat Production	Diamond Beat Production	4M
2021	Като за последно	Diamond Beat Production	Diamond Beat Production	Anastasia Mavrodieva and Diamond Beat Production	4M
2021	Сърцето ми (released after his own death)	Ateshkhan Teofikov and Denis Teofikov	Ateshkhan Teofikov and Deyan Asenov	Denis Teofikov	2M
2022	Пак ще се броиш (duo with Emilia, released after his own death)	Diamond Beat Production	Diamond Beat Production	Diamond Beat Production	10M
2022	Единствено (duo with Emilia, released after his own death)	Diamond Beat Production	Diamond Beat Production	Diamond Beat Production	6M
2022	Миг без теб (released after his own death)	Sylvester Mateev-Silver	Sylvester Mateev-Silver	Sylvester Mateev-Silver and Rumen Borilov	
2023	Безразлично (featuring Silver, released after his own death)	Sylvester Mateev-Silver	Sylvester Mateev-Silver	Sylvester Mateev-Silver	
2023	За малко (duo with Dessita, released after his own death)	Digital Distributed by: Silvernoise / KVZ Music	Nikola Tomov	Denis Teofikov and Dessita	
2024	Горе-горе (featuring Eva-Marty, released after his own death)	FGM Studio	FGM Studio	Silverster Mateev - Silver	
2026	Никой друг (duo with Djulia, released after his own death)	Denis Teofikov, Ateshkhan Teofikov and Nikolay Pashev	Dzevat Sound Studio and Kaloyan Kotsev (FGM)	Denis Teofikov and Radostin Radostinov	

=== Songs with special participation ===
Year	Song	Performers	Produced by	Arranged by	Lyrics	Views on YouTube
2018	Оп, оп	Dzhuliya, with the participation of Denis Teofikov	Diamond Beat Production	Diamond Beat Production	Anastasia Mavrodieva	10M

== Filmography ==
- Monkey (2016) – Pavel
