= 13 (Marta Savić album) =

Studio album by Marta Savić
- Released: 24 October 2011
- Genre: turbo folk
- Label: K::CN Records
- Producer: Miraco Music

Marta Savić chronology
Muški kompleksi (2009)	13 (2011)

Singles from 13
- 1. "Na istoj sam adresi" Released: 23 September 2010; 2. "Ja nisam takva" Released: 20 August 2011; 3. "Idiot" Released: 15 September 2011; 4. "Mama" Released: 23 October 2011; 5. "Tresi mesi" Released: 2011; 6. "Feredža" Released: 2011; 7. "Štikla" Released: 2012

13 is the thirteenth studio album by Bosnian Serb turbo folk recording artist Marta Savić. It was released 24 October 2011 through the record label K::CN Records.

== Singles ==
"Na istoj sam adresi" was the album's lead single, released 23 September 2010. The second single was "Ja nisam tavka", released 20 August 2011.

"Idiot", the album's third single, was released 15 September 2011 along with the music video. The video was removed from YouTube for its graphic sex scenes and a censored version was re-uploaded in its place.

The fourth single was "Mama" featuring Azis and Mirko Gavrić. The music video for "Mama" was filmed 18 September 2011 for €12,000. It premiered 5 December 2011.

== Track listing ==
All arrangements were done by Mirko Gavrić and Marko Nedeljković; all production was done by Miraco Music.

No.	Title	Lyrics	Length
1.	"Zlatom zlatila"	Marta Savić	3:40
2.	"Tresi mesi"	Savić; Gavrić	3:28
3.	"Mama" (with Azis featuring Mirko Gavrić)	Milosh Mimy	3:26
4.	"Idiot"	Savić	3:42
5.	"Ja nisam takva"	Savić	3:52
6.	"Feredža"	Savić; Gavrić	4:47
7.	"Na istoj sam adresi"	Savić	3:40
8.	"Ne veruj ni jednoj ženi" (featuring Davor Marković)	Savić; Gavrić	3:58
9.	"Štikla"	Savić	3:28
10.	"Hiljadu jedan"	Savić; Gavrić	3:53
Total length:			37:54

Notes

- "Tresi mesi" interpolates "Imi e atât de bine" (2009), performed by Lucian Sereș.
- "Mama" is a Serbian-language cover of "Origjinale" (2010), penned by Aurela Gaçe and Dr. Flori and composed by Flori Mumajesi, and performed by Gaçe featuring Dr. Flori and Marsel.
- "Idiot" is a Serbian-language cover of "Pia na sigkrithi mazi sou" ("Ποια να συγκριθεί μαζί σου"; 2011), written by Phoebus, and performed by Thanos Petrelis.
- "Ja nisam takva" is a Serbian-language cover of "Pos na to exigiso" ("Πως να το εξηγήσω"; 2005), penned by Ilias Filippou and composed by Kyriakos Papadopoulos, and performed by Nikos Vertis.
- "Feredža" is a Serbian-language cover of "Par' ta ola dika sou" ("Παρ' τα όλα δικά σου"; 2008), penned by Eleana Vrachali and composed by Michalis Hatzigiannis, and performed by Hatzigiannis.
- "Na istoj sam adresi" is a Serbian-language cover of "Theos" ("Θεός"; 2010), written by Phoebus, and performed by Nino.
- "Ne veruj ni jednoj ženi" is a Serbian-language cover of "Mono esy" ("Μόνο εσύ"; 2011), penned by Christos Kantzelis and composed by Tasos Panagis, and performed by Dionysis Makris.
- "Štikla" is a Serbian-language cover of "Ase me" ("Άσε με"; 2010), penned by Nektarios Tyrakis and composed by Dimitri Stassos and Irini Michas, and performed by Eleni Foureira.

== Personnel ==
=== Instruments ===
- Lejla Hot – backing vocals
- Mirko Gavrić – backing vocals
- Aleksandar Ilić Prke – drums
- Petar Trumbetaš – guitar, bouzouki
- Kalin Georgiev – kaval, fife
- Marko Tropico – keyboards

=== Production and recording ===
- Miraco Music – producing, mixing, mastering

=== Crew ===
- Petar Peđa Božić – hair
- Valerija Milovanović – make-up
- Mirko Gavrić – photography
