= Boeva =

Boeva is a surname. Notable people with the surname include:

- Elena Boeva (born 1985), Bulgarian model and actress
- Tanya Boeva (born 1973), Bulgarian pop and Chalga singer
