= Orchestra Kristal =

Orchestra Kristal (Bulgarian: оркестър Кристал) are a Bulgarian pop-folk or chalga band from Yambol. It is one of two bands, the other being the similarly named Orchestra Kristali from Mihailovgrad, symbolizing the pop-folk genre in Bulgaria.

== Discography ==
=== Studio albums ===
==== Bulgarian albums ====
- Vǎrnete se, bǎlgari (1991)
- Robinja sǎm tvoja (1993)
- Mili moj (1994)
- Toni Dačeva i duet Šans (1995)
- Toni Dačeva i Mustafa Čaušev (1995)
- Kralica sǎm az (1996)
- Vsičko e ljubov (1998)
- Edna celuvka (1999)
- V novija vek (1999)
- Magija (2001)
- Na trapeza s ork. Kristal (2001)
- Kjučeci (2002)
- Na trapeza s ork. Kristal 2 (2002)
- Balkanika (2003)
- Na trapeza s ork. Kristal 3 (2003)
- Romski biseri (2004)
- Tik Tak (2004)
- Čat-čat (2004)
- Super kjučeci (2005)
- Hit kjučeci (2006)

==== Turkish Albums ====
- Bizim İkimiz Esmeriz (2001)
- Reyhan ve Ork. Kristal (2002)
- Biz Şekeriz (2003)
- Tatlı Kız (2004)
- Kaderim (2005)
- Al Beni (2006)

=== Compilations ===
- Hitovete na Kristal (1997)
- Zlatnite Hitove na ork. Kristal (2006)

=== Video albums ===
- Ork. Kristal (1991)
- Robinya sum tvoya (1992)
- Mili Moi (1993)
- Kristal i Priyateli (1995)
- Vsichko e lyubov (1998)
- Na trapeza s ork. Kristal 2 (2003)
- Biz şekeriz (2003)
- Na trapeza s ork. Kristal 3 (2003)
