= Malina (Bulgarian singer) =

Bulgarian pop-folk singer

Malina Малина Станчева Ставчева
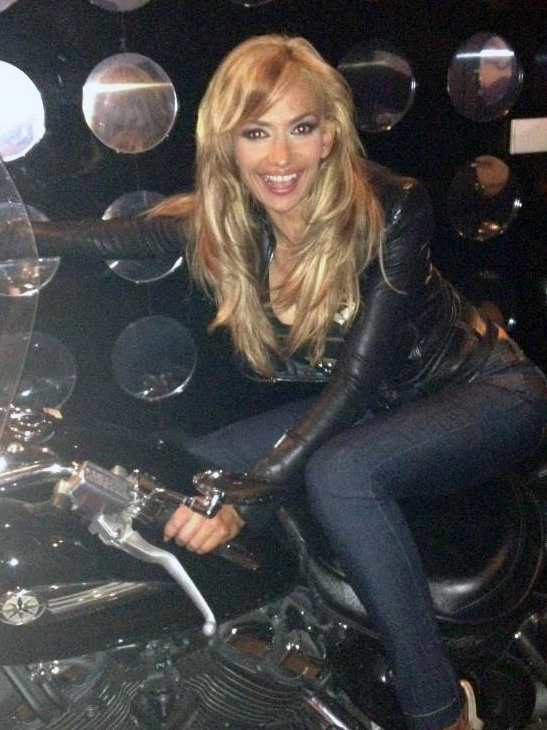

Background information
- Born: Malina Stancheva Stancheva; 7 June 1967 (age 59); Sevlievo, Bulgaria
- Genres: Chalga (pop-folk), electropop
- Years active: 2000-present
- Label: Payner Music

Malina Stancheva Stancheva (Bulgarian: Малина Станчева Станчева) or Malina (Bulgarian: Малина),(born 7 June 1967) is a Bulgarian Chalga (pop-folk) singer.

== Studio albums ==
Огнена звезда (2001)

1. Да или не
2. Огнена звезда
3. Към теб вървя
4. Луда светлина
5. Между ад и рай
6. Музика
7. Не е грях
8. Нежна любов
9. Дива страст
10. Само ти
11. Любовната стрела
12. Горски плод
13. Хай-ли-ли
14. Болка

Malina (2003)

1. Леден свят
2. Само ме обичай
3. Тръгвам си
4. Кажи обичам те
5. Любовта е...
6. Само миг (ремикс)
7. Само ме обичай (ремикс)
8. Обичам лудо
9. Две очи
10. Не плачи, замълчи
11. Остани
12. Само миг

== Compilations ==
Златните хитове на Пайнер 10 - Malina (2013)

1. Двойници
2. Всякакви мъже
3. Какво направи с мен
4. Има кой
5. Още палиш
6. Не знаеш (дует с Азис)
7. Ситуация
8. Най-красивата (дует с Азис)
9. Само тази нощ
10. Страст

== Video albums ==
Malina Best Video Selection 1 (2003)

1. Само ти
2. Ne ye gryakh
3. Ognena zvezda
4. Diva strast
5. Ne plachi, zam"lchi
6. Da ili ne (remiks)
7. Muzika (remiks)
8. YEla
9. Obicham ludo
10. Samo mig
11. Leden svyat
12. Obicham ludo (live)

Malina Best Video Selection 2 (2007)

1. Oshche palish
2. Strast
3. Drug p"t
4. Stud
5. Iskam, iskam (duyet s Azis)
6. Neka da ne znam
7. V tishinata
8. Chernite ochi (duyet s Azis)
9. Samo tazi noshch
10. Kakvo napravi s men
11. Ne znayesh (duyet s Azis)
12. Miks lyatno turne 2007
