= Milko Kalaidjiev =

Bulgarian singer

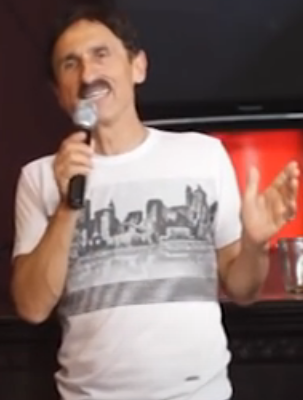
Milko Kalaidjiev in 2013.

Mihail Panayotov "Milko" Kalaidjiev (Bulgarian: Михаил Панайотов Калайджиев - Милко) is the first Bulgarian singer signed to the Payner label. He was born on 23 September 1951 in Svilengrad, Bulgaria.

== Personal life ==
Milko has three children. His eldest son Bonko works as a lawyer in Sofia. His twins, Aleks and Antonio (born 1987), are from his wife Margarita. He works as a farmer and a businessman.

In 2019, he ran as a mayor for the Svilengrad Municipality from Movement for Rights and Freedoms (DPS) in the 2019 Bulgarian local elections and gained 4% of the vote.

== Albums ==
- 1996 - Има ли Господ? (Is there a God?)
- 1997 - Прошка (Forgiveness)
- 1998 - Спомен за обич (Memory of love)
- 1999 - Най-доброто (The Best)
- 2000 - GSM
- 2001 - Софиянка (Woman from Sofia)
- 2002 - Тарикат и тарикатка (Wiseguy and wisewoman)
- 2002 - Европеец - произведено в България (European - Made in Bulgaria)
- 2003 - Танцувай с мен (Dance with me)
- 2004 - Десетият (The Tenth)
- 2013 - Кръчма е душата ми (My soul is a pub)

== Foreign performances ==
Milko has performed in North Macedonia, Israel, United States, Albania, Turkey, Netherlands, Greece, Cyprus and Canada.

== Producer ==
As a singer, Milko discovered the famous Bulgarian pop-folk singers Preslava, Galena, Мira, Anelia, Emilia, Dzhena and others.

== Honors ==
- Duet of the year (Hey, the little) with Mira - 2003 (Planeta TV Bulgaria)
- Song of the year 2009 (Planeta TV Bulgaria)
