= Preslava =

Bulgarian pop-folk singer (born 1984)

Preslava Преслава
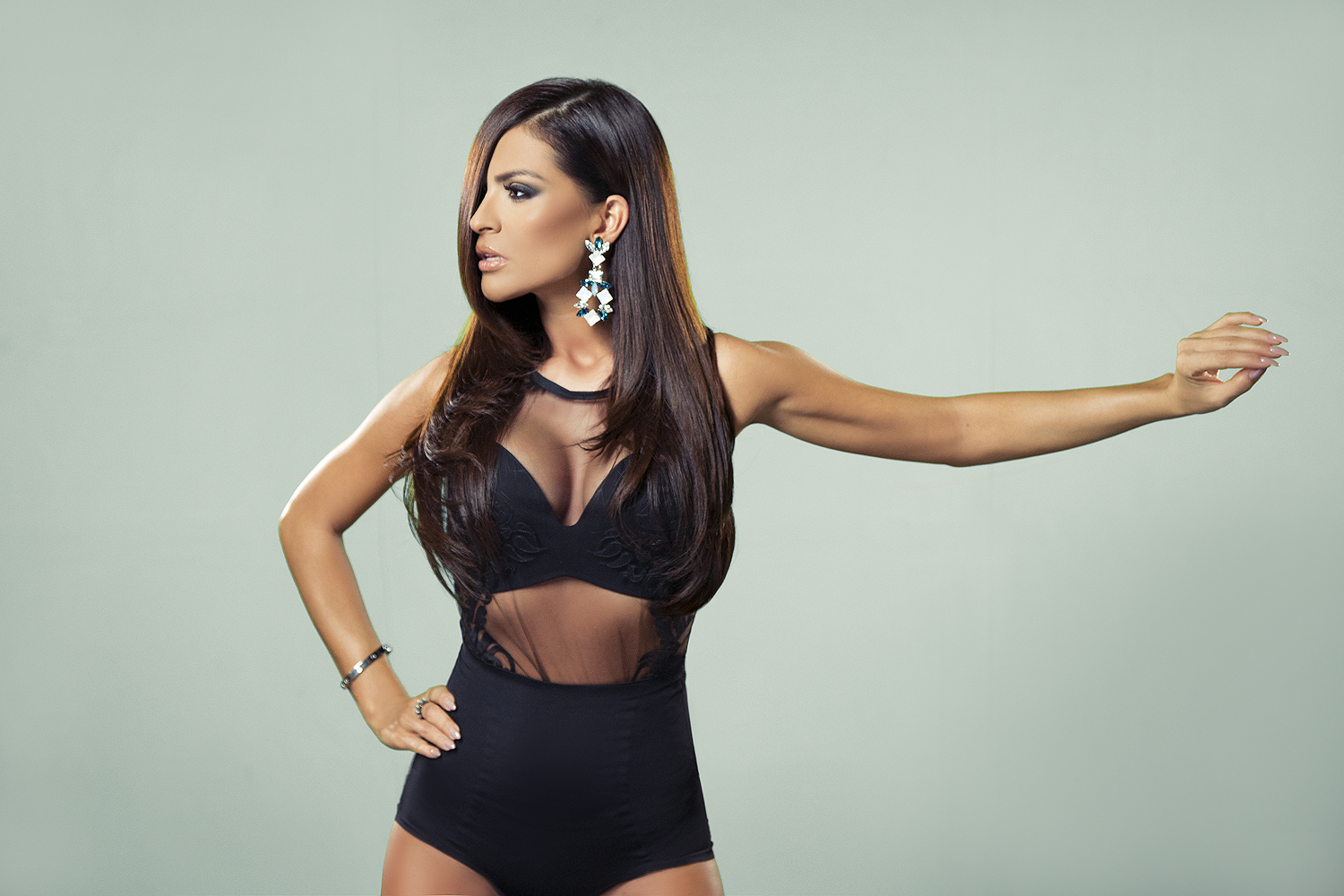
- Preslava in 2015

Background information
- Also known as: Preslava Koleva Ivanova
- Born: Petya Koleva Ivanova; 26 June 1984 (age 42); Tolbukhin, Bulgaria
- Genres: Pop Folk; Turbo Folk; Pop; R&B; Dance Pop
- Occupation: Singer
- Years active: 2003–present
- Label: Payner
- Spouse: Pavel Lazarov
- Website: preslavaonline.com pscosmetics.bg

Preslava Koleva Ivanova (Note: Bulgarian: Преслава Колева Иванова) (born Petya Koleva Ivanova, (Note: Bulgarian: Петя Колева Иванова) on 26 June 1984), better known mononymously as Preslava, is a Bulgarian singer. She is considered one of the key names in Bulgarian contemporary music, and has won more than 60 awards since her debut in 2004. As of 2025, she has won the Bulgarian Singer of the Year award 13 times since the start of her music career in 2005.

== Life and career ==
=== Early life (1984–2003) ===
Petya Koleva Ivanova was born on June 26, 1984, in Dobrich, Bulgaria. Her mother, Yanka Toncheva was a seamstress. Her father, Kolyo Tonchev, was a worldwide race car driver. Ivanova has an older sister named Ivelina who is a folk singer. She sang her first song when she was 7 years old. Despite her parents disapproval, she started singing in nightclubs aged 15. She completed her musical education with the specialty 'folk singing' with Gadulka speciality.

=== Career beings and Preslava (2004) ===
During the winter of 2004 a prominent singer from the music company Payner, Milko Kalaidjiev asked her to perform with his group for a few events. Impressed by her excessive talent, he helped her to become a part of the company. In the beginning of 2004 she released her first song, "Nezhen reket" which was a duet with Milko Kalaidjiev. In 2004, she picked a stage name – Preslava and changed her creative direction. Instead of typical pop folk, her later songs such as "Duma za vyarnost", "Tazi nosht bezumna" and "Mili moy" were more modern sounding. They were part of her debut album, Preslava, released in December. It featured 16 songs in total. The record was received very well. It won the "Album of the Year" award in Nov Folk Magazine''s Annual Awards of 2004. In the same ceremony, Preslava won the "Founding and Debut of the year" award. In the Annual Music Awards of Planeta TV of 2004, she won awards for "Debut of the year" and "Most prosperous performer of the year". She built the Zetiova cheshma in Mramor in 2003.

=== Dyavolsko Zhelanie and Intriga (2005–2006) ===
In the span of April to June 2005, two new singles, "Dyavolsko zhelanie" and "Zavinagi tvoya" were released. Both of them were very positively received, especially "Dyavolsko zhelanie" which won the "Hit of the Year" award in Planeta TV's Annual Music Awards of 2005. Preslava was among the artists of Planeta TV's Summer Tour for first time in her career. In November she released her second album, Dyavolsko zhelanie. A new single with a music video, "Finalni dumi" was dropped within the same month. In Nov Folk's Annual Awards of 2005 Preslava won the "Most Prosperous Performer" award. In April 2006 a new single, "I kogato samne" was released. It won song of the year award in the Annual Music Awards of Planeta TV of 2006 and Nov Folk Magazine's Annual Awards of 2006. Preslava was again part of the Planeta TV's Summer Tour. Within the end of year two new singles, "Zaklevam te" and "Lazha e" were released, alongside her third studio album Intriga. "Lazha e" was the first rock song she ever recorded.

== Personal life ==
Since late 2017, she has been in a relationship with the Bulgarian businessman Pavel Lazarov. On September 14, 2018, she gave birth to a baby girl, Paola.

== Discography ==
Studio albums

- Preslava (2004)
- Dyavolsko zhelanie (2005)
- Intriga (2006)
- Ne sam angel (2007)
- Pazi se ot priyatelki (2009)
- Kak ti stoi (2011)
- Da gori v lyubov (2019)
- Ulitsata (2024)

Compilation albums

- Mega Mix (2006)
- The Best of Preslava (2009)
- Hit Collection MP3 (2009)
- Zlatnite hitove na Payner 16 (2013)
- Hitovete na Preslava (2014)

Video albums

- Video Selection (2005)
- Best Video Selection 2 (2008)

== Music videos ==
Music Video	Premiere date	Album	Director
Nezhen reket	2003	Non-album song	Petyo Kartulev/Nikolay Nankov
Duma za vyarnost	2004	Preslava 2004	Nikolay Skerlev
Tazi nosht bezumna	2004	Preslava 2004	Lyudmil Ilarionov
Mili moy	2004	Preslava 2004	Nikolay Skerlev
Razdvoeni	2004	Preslava 2004	Nikolay Skerlev
Molish me	2004	Preslava 2004	Lyudmil Ilarionov
Obicham te	2004	Preslava 2004	Lyudmil Ilarionov
Dyavolsko zhelanie	07.04.2005	Dyavolsko zhelanie	Nikolay Skerlev
Zavinagi tvoya	05.06.2005	Dyavolsko zhelanie	Nikolay Skerlev
Finalni dumi	16.10.2005	Dyavolsko zhelanie	Nikolay Skerlev
Nyamam pravo	04.02.2006	Dyavolsko zhelanie	Petyo Kartulev/Nikolay Nankov
I kogato samne	02.04.2006	Intriga	Nikolay Skerlev
Preday se na zhelanieto	10.08.2006	Intriga	Lyudmil Ilarionov
Zaklevam te	22.09.2006	Intriga	Lyudmil Ilarionov
Lazha e	20.12.2006	Intriga	Nikolay Skerlev
Nishto drugo	18.05.2007	Intriga	Lyudmil Ilarionov
Preday se na zhelanieto 2	09.06.2007	Ne sam angel	Nikolay Skerlev
Mazh na horizonta	23.07.2007	Ne sam angel	Lyudmil Ilarionov
Moyat nov lyubovnik	11.12.2007	Ne sam angel	Lyudmil Ilarionov
Ne sam angel	29.12.2007	Ne sam angel	Nikolay Nankov
Posleden adres	14.05.2008	Ne sam angel	Lyudmil Ilarionov
Novata ti	27.09.2008	Pazi se ot priyatelki	Lyudmil Ilarionov
Ot dobrite momicheta	04.11.2008	Pazi se ot priyatelki	Lyudmil Ilarionov
Chervena tochka	26.03.2009	Pazi se ot priyatelki	Lyudmil Ilarionov
Barzo li govorya	01.06.2009	Pazi se ot priyatelki	Nikolay Nankov
Fenomen	01.09.2009	Pazi se ot priyatelki	Lyudmil Ilarionov
Useshtane za Merilin	08.09.2009	Pazi se ot priyatelki	Nikolay Nankov
Ne mi prechi	26.11.2009	Hitovete na Preslava	Nikolay Skerlev
Dishay	11.02.2010	Hitovete na Preslava	Lyudmil Ilarionov
Piya za tebe	25.05.2010	Kak ti stoi	Lyudmil Ilarionov
Zhenite sled men	11.07.2010	Kak ti stoi	Lyudmil Ilarionov
Kak ti stoi	01.01.2011	Kak ti stoi	Lyudmil Ilarionov
Mrasno i poleka	18.02.2011	Kak ti stoi	Lyudmil Ilarionov
Hayde, otkazhi me	12.03.2011	Kak ti stoi	Lyudmil Ilarionov
Kato za final	05.08.2011	Kak ti stoi	Lyudmil Ilarionov
Ludata doyde	15.05.2012	Hitovete na Preslava	Lyudmil Ilarionov
Praveno e s drug	04.10.2012	Hitovete na Preslava	Nikolay Skerlev
Razkriy me	24.10.2012	Hitovete na Preslava	Lyudmil Ilarionov
Butilka	17.01.2013	Non-album song	Nikolay Skerlev
Skoro	17.07.2013	Hitovete na Preslava	Lyudmil Ilarionov
Nyama da sam druga	07.08.2013	Hitovete na Preslava	Lyudmil Ilarionov
Rezhim "neprilichna"	14.02.2014	Hitovete na Preslava	Lyudmil Ilarionov
Pishi go neuspeshno	09.04.2014	Non-album songs	Lyudmil Ilarionov/Georgi Markov
Poveche ne pitay	23.09.2014	Non-album songs	Lyudmil Ilarionov
Nasheto lyubov e	12.12.2014	Non-album songs	Lyudmil Ilarionov
Ako utre me gubish	14.02.2015	Non-album songs	Lyudmil Ilarionov
Nokaut (with Vanya)	19.03.2015	Non-album songs	Nikolay Skerlev
Amatyorka	05.06.2015	Non-album songs	Aleksandar Mollov
Na tebe ne otkazvam	15.09.2015	Non-album songs	Nikolay Skerlev
S teb ili s nikoy (with Fiki)	08.12.2015	Non-album songs	Lyudmil Ilarionov
In control (with Stefan Ilchev)	09.02.2016	Non-album songs	Nikolay Skerlev
Chupliva i vlyubena	23.03.2016	Non-album songs	Nikolay Skerlev
Nyama da ti pisha	26.06.2016	Non-album songs	Georgi Markov
Bez teb	14.12.2016	Non-album songs	Kiril Kirov
Pada zvezda	05.05.2017	Non-album songs	Georgi Markov
Tuk zhena mu pazi (with Dzhena)	09.08.2017	Non-album songs	Georgi Markov
Ne se iztrivash	01.11.2017	Da gori v lyubov	Georgi Markov
Obratno v igrata	16.02.2018	Da gori v lyubov	Lyudmil Ilarionov
Bogovi zemljom hode (with Dragan Kojić Keba)	24.04.2018	Da gori v lyubov	Georgi Markov
Da gori v lyubov	28.09.2018	Da gori v lyubov	Lyudmil Ilarionov
Iztreznyavash li	14.02.2019	Da gori v lyubov	Viktor Antonov - Rik
Piyan	19.07.2019	Da gori v lyubov	Viktor Antonov - Rik
Taka ni se pada (with Galin)	22.10.2019	Non-album song	Viktor Antonov - Rik
Beden v sartseto	19.06.2020	Ulitsata	Viktor Antonov - Rik
V tvoeto leglo	29.04.2021	Ulitsata	Viktor Antonov - Rik
Gorchivi istini (with Lidia)	24.06.2021	Non-album song	Viktor Antonov - Rik
Ot utre	22.01.2022	Ulitsata	Viktor Antonov - Rik
Sladkoto zlo (with Konstantin)	28.04.2022	Ulitsata	Viktor Antonov - Rik
Mangava Tut (with Sofi Marinova)	06.10.2022	Ulitsata	Viktor Antonov - Rik
Malchete si	23.11.2022	Ulitsata	Nikolay Skerlev
Balkansko za razkosh	04.05.2023	Ulitsata	Lyusi (Lyudmil Ilarionov)
Spomeni (with Aristos Constantinou)	16.06.2023	Ulitsata	Lyusi (Lyudmil Ilarionov)
Ulitsata	16.11.2023	Ulitsata	Torex (Иван Димитров)
Da i Prisedne	12.04.2024	Ulitsata	Torex (Иван Димитров)
Starata ni Pesen	01.08.2024	Ulitsata	Lyusi (Lyudmil Ilarionov)
Nishto	08.08.2024	Ulitsata	Lyusi (Lyudmil Ilarionov)
Pismo	07.11.2024	Ulitsata	Viktor Antonov - Rikk
S nervite sam zle	15.11.2024	Ulitsata	Torex (Иван Димитров)
Beshe li ti hubavo	04.04.2025	Non-album song	Torex (Иван Димитров)
Koi be, koi	14.07.2025	Non-album song	Viktor Antonov - Rikk
Za nagrada	05.11.2025	Non-album song	Viktor Antonov - Rikk
Hvashtame bas	05.05.2026	Non-album song	Viktor Antonov - Rikk
Rozovite ochila	26.06.2026	Non-album song	Viktor Antonov - Rikk
Ako si tragnesh	02.08.2026	Non-album song	Viktor Antonov - Rikk

== Tours ==
- Planeta Prima 2005 (2005)
- Planeta Prima 2006 (2006)
- Planeta Derby 2007 (2007)
- Planeta Derby Plus 2008 (2008)
- Planeta Derby 2009 (2009)
- Planeta Derby 2010 (2010)
- Preslava USA Tour (2012)
- Planeta Summer 2014 (2014)
