= Marta Savić =

Serbian singer

- Марта Савић
- Born: 7 May 1966 (age 60); Vranjak, SR Bosnia and Herzegovina, SFR Yugoslavia
- Occupations: Singer; songwriter
- Years active: 1987–present
- Spouse: Mile Kitić (m. 1988)
- Children: Elena Kitić
- Musical career
- Genre: Turbo-folk
- Instrument: vocals
- Labels: Jugoton; ZaM; Grand Production; K::CN Records
- Website: www.martasavic.com

Marta Savić (Serbian Cyrillic: Марта Савић; born 7 May 1966) is a Bosnian-born Serbian turbo-folk singer and songwriter. Since 1988, she has released thirteen studio albums. After the release of her latest studio album 13 (2011), she has mostly focused on songwriting rather than her recording career.

== Early life ==
Marta Savić was born to Bosnian Serb parents in Vranjak, a village near Modriča, Bosnia and Herzegovina. At the age of two months, her family settled in the Serbian town Jaša Tomić. In 1978, the family relocated to Hannover, Germany, where she finished primary and secondary school.

== Personal life ==
In 1988, she met singer Mile Kitić, whom she married later the same year. Together they have a daughter named Elena (also a singer). Savić and Kitić live together in Belgrade, Serbia.

In January 2013, Marta Savić underwent gallbladder surgery.

== Discography ==
- Zaboravi druge žene (1988)
- Proklet bio (1990)
- Grešnica (1993)
- Nemoj bar ti (1994)
- Kad sam srela (1996)
- Kad zavoliš, pa izgubiš (1999)
- Dijamanti, brilijanti (2000)
- Ikad ili nikad (2001)
- Nismo pucali jedno u drugo (2002)
- Ravno do Kosova (2003)
- Erotica (2006)
- Muški kompleksi (2009)
- 13 (2011)
