= Toni Storaro =

Bulgarian singer

Toni Storaro Тони Стораро
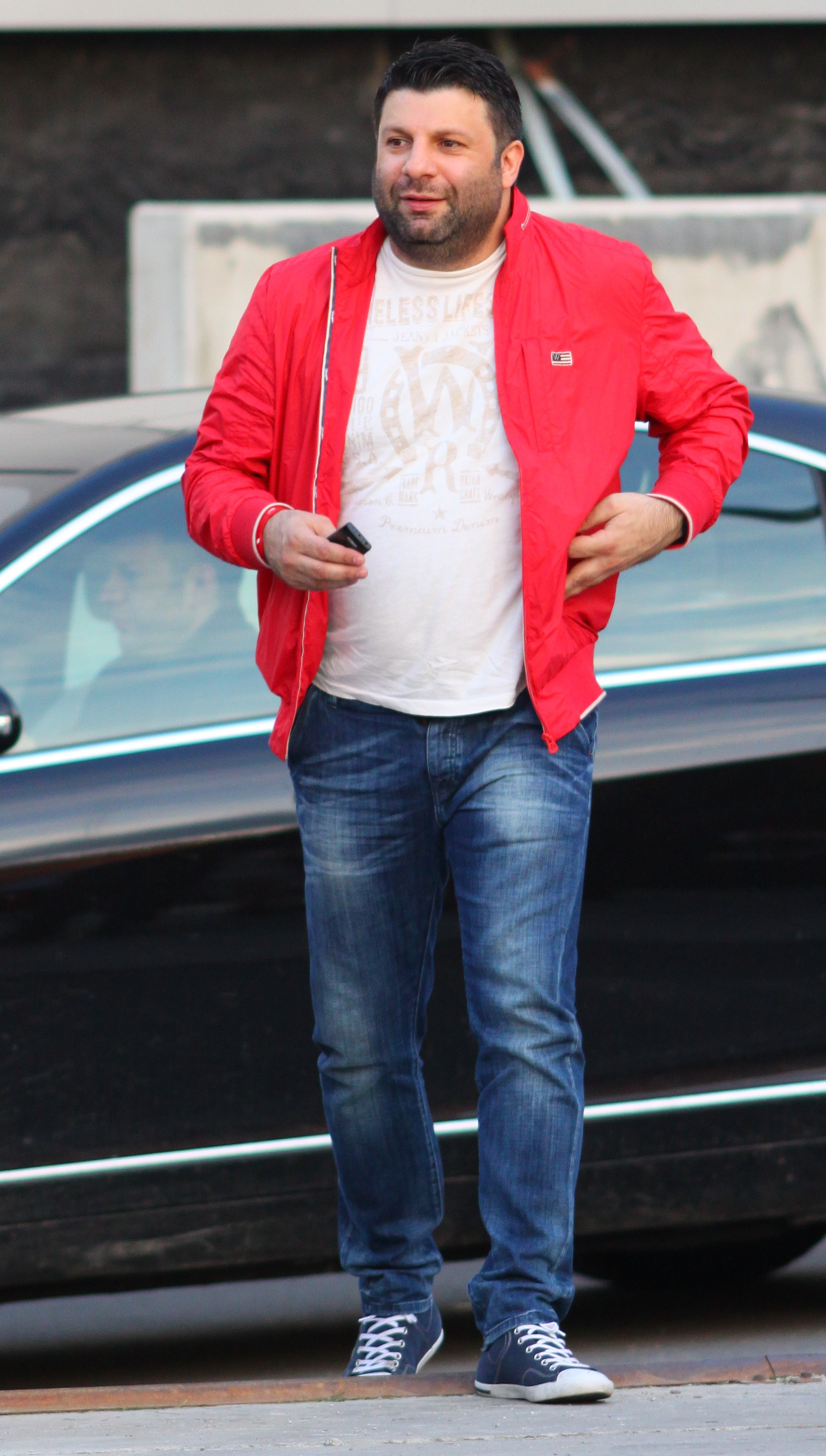

Background information
- Born: Tuncher Fikret Ali; 2 August 1976 (age 49); Shumen, Bulgaria
- Genres: Chalga
- Occupations: Singer, songwriter
- Instrument: Vocals
- Label: Storaro Music

Tuncher Fikret Ali (Bulgarian: Тунчер Фикрет Али, Turkish: Tunçer Fikret Ali; born 2 August 1976), better known by his stage name Toni Storaro (Bulgarian: Тони Стораро) is a Turkish-Bulgarian singer. He is a leading performer on the Bulgarian music label Diapason Records.

== Career ==
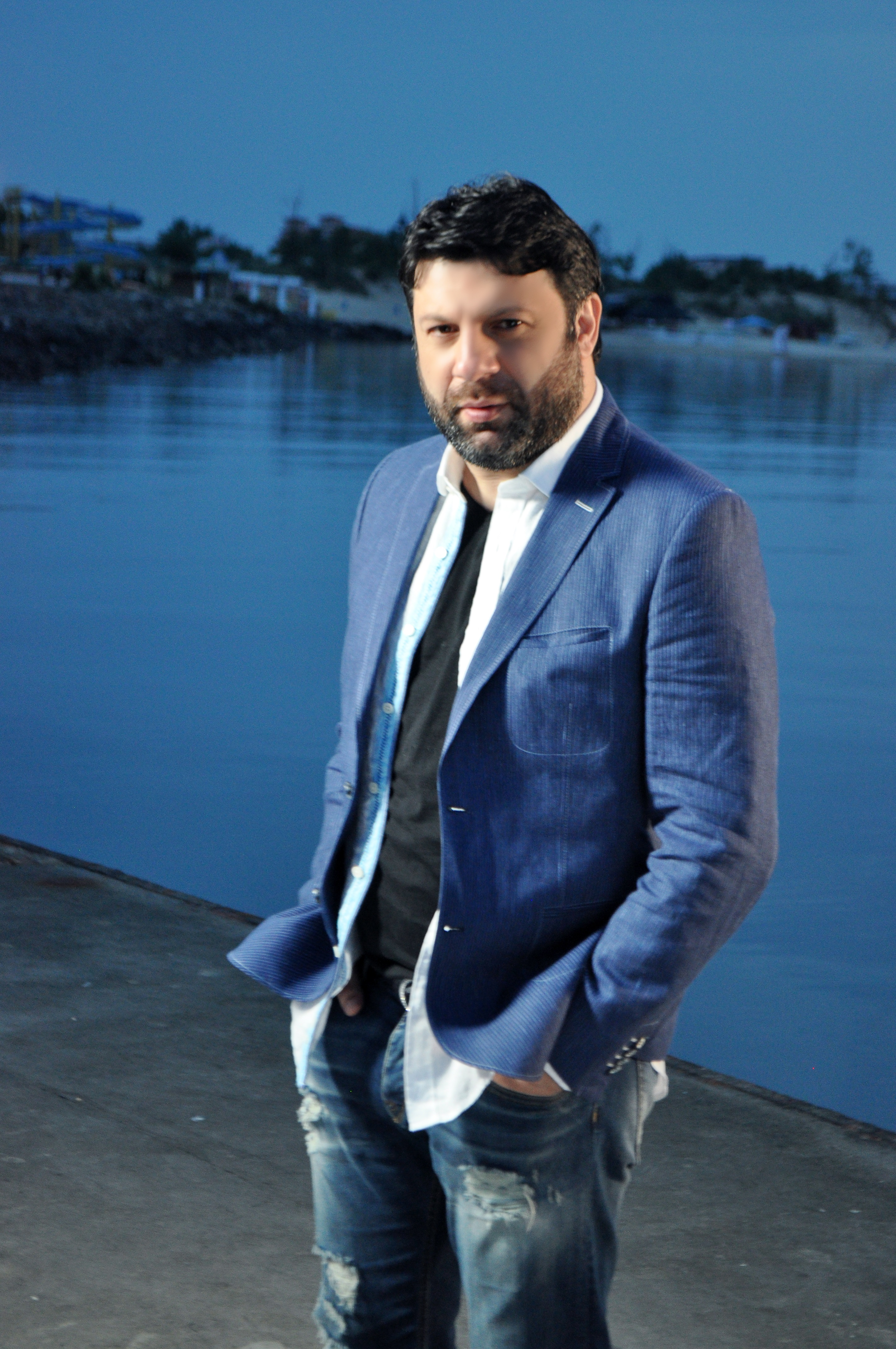
Toni Storaro

Toni Storaro, born Tuncher Fikret Ali, has established himself as one of the largest names in Bulgarian popular and chalga music. A prolific artist, in 15 years, he produced 11 albums in Bulgarian and Turkish languages and around 30 hits. He is known for his warm, rich, deep and unique voice with rich ornamentation mixing various Balkan influences (Bulgarian, Turkish, Greek, Albanian and Serb). His 2005 album "For one woman" (Bulgarian: За една жена) with various Balkan songs recorded in Germany was a huge hit with multiple singles and an eventual "Виртуозно майсторство" (virtuoso mastery) coveted award at the 8th Annual Awards for New "Folk" (Bulgarian: Годишни награди на "Нов фолк"). In 2007 came awards for Best Artist at the First Fan TV (Фен ТВ) Music Awards and Best Singer Award at the 10th Annual Awards for "New Folk".

He has had collaborations with Yordanka Hristova, Djansever, Sofi Marinova, Tanya Boeva, Teodora and Azis, as well as Serbian Jovana Tipšin and Turkish Burak Aziz. He also enjoys immense popularity abroad among Bulgarian and Balkan diaspora, with many tours in Greece, Turkey, Spain, Belgium, Netherlands, Germany, Canada and the United States. Many of his songs have been covered by other Balkan artists, most notably by Serbian Dragana Mirković and Macedonian Toše Proeski and others. He was given a huge reception in Turkey on 2 June 2006 singing in the Turkish megastar Tarkan's concert. He followed that with a big concert in Greece where his voice is usually compared to that of Greek star Vasilis Karras and dubbed "Bulgaria's Karras". His famous song "For a Woman" (Bulgarian: "За една жена") was interpreted on the second season of Bulgarian Music Idol. 2008 saw the release of his 11th album with all brand new songs, that brought him again awards for Best Artist at the 2nd Fan TV (Фен ТВ) Music Awards, Best Singer at the 11th Annual Awards for "New Folk" as well as the title for "Best Singer of Love Songs" on radio station Romantica.

== Awards ==
- 2006–2007: Best Artist at the 1st and 2nd Fan TV (Фен ТВ) Music Awards

== Discography ==
=== Albums ===
- Минижуп (2000)
- Имам само теб (2001)
- Нема пари (2001)
- Live party (2002)
- Карай да върви (2003)
- Битмейн ашк (2004)
- За една жена (2005)
- Теб обичам (2006)
- Балканско сърце (2006)
- Тони Стораро (2009)
- Живея само за тебе (2014)

Compilations

- Best vol. 1 (2008)
- 60 hits collection.mp3 (2010)

=== Songs ===
(selective)

- "Друг живот" (duet with Desi) (2003)
- "Две съдби" (duet with Tanya Boeva) (2001)
- "Обичамwith Azis) (2004)
- "Прости ми" (2004
- "Так0)

Zafeiris Melas) (2014)

- "Най-добрата фирма" (2016)
- "Повече не питай" (duet with Preslava) (2014)
- "Любов" (duet with Sofi Marinova) (2014)
- "Специален поздрав" (duet with Sali Okka) (2015)
- "Искам да ме чувстваш" (2015)
- "Не давам да си чужда" (duet with Alisia) (2015)
- "Браво" (2015)
- "Питбул" (duet with Emilia) (2015)
- "Истина" (2015)
- "От гордост да боли" (duet wityh Roksana) (2015)
- "Денят на любовта" (2016)
- "Луд" (2016)
- "Лято 2016" (2016)
- "Добре ти беше" (duet with Alisia) (2017)
- "Златото на тати" (duet with Alisia) (2018)
