= Desi Slava =

Bulgarian singer-songwriter and producer

Desi Slava Деси Слава
- Born: Desislava Ivanova Doneva; 7 March 1979 (age 47); Radnevo, Bulgaria
- Genres: Pop Folk, Folklore, Pop, Dance Pop, R&B, World
- Occupation: Singer
- Years active: 1998–present
- Labels: New Music Stars, Payner

Desislava Ivanova Doneva (Bulgarian: Десислава Иванова Донева; born 7 March 1979), known by her stage names Desi Slava (Bulgarian: Деси Слава) or DESS, is a Bulgarian singer-songwriter and producer.

== Personal life ==
She has been in a relationship with the Bulgarian boxer Blagoy Naydenov since 2016. They have one son, born in 2017. Desi Slava has a son (born 2001) from a previous relationship.

== Career ==
Doneva's first stage appearances began at an early age, when she would win awards at festivals for children. When she was 18 years old Payner offered her a contract and she released her first studio album Нямам проблеми (I Got No Problems), in which she wrote/co-wrote five of the 11 songs. The following year she released her second studio album Ези-Тура (Heads or Tails), which gained critical acclaim. Her third studio album Завинаги (Forever) was released in 2001 and produced the hit-single Beli Noshti (White nights). In 2002 Doneva released Мистерия (Mystery).

In 2003 she left Payner, citing she felt limited in her musical and creative freedom by the company. In early 2004, she founded her own company New Music Stars, and released Любовта е само чувство (Love is just a feeling) and two albums The Best of Desi Slava and the duet album Together with Azis. In 2005, she released Гореща следа (A Hot mark).

In 2006, she released the album Сладки сънища (Sweet dreams).

In 2007, Doneva appeared on the cover of FHM Bulgaria magazine, and took part in Big Brother VIP edition. She toured with The Comedians on a national tour. Doneva was the first star to be invited to MAD SECRET CONCERT, where she performed cover songs of Sade, Lenny Kravitz, Christina Aguilera and Michael Jackson among others.

In 2007, Doneva released an unofficial Spanish-language album Estoy aqui. Before the album was finished, it mysteriously leaked on the internet, leading her to make a decision not to release it. However, some of the songs became internet hits.

In 2009, the album Послушай сърцето си (Listen to your heart) was released. In the same year, single "Agapi Mou" (Loving you) (DesiSlava ft. Kostas Martakis) – dance-pop duet, created by "Symphonics" and produced by Desislava. In Greece, the song was released in the album of Kostas Pio konta, published by Universal Music Greece.

Between 2009 and 2010, Doneva produced two young talents – Dzhemile and Nadia.

In 2011, the single Калино моме (Boy George, Marc Vedo ft. DesiSlava) and an experimental album Slavatronica was released. She also started cooperation with Romanian team, resulting in I like a summer hit, taking all first places in pop charts. This provided DESS with recognition by her colleagues from the pop industry. Consequently, she change her name for dance projects to DESS.

In 2012, the song through which Desislava appeared on the Bulgarian Eurovision was released. In the semi-final, Dess was selected as number 1 by a jury and audience. At the final, she came second with the song Love is alive. In the same year, she and Toni Storaro presented a duet искам без теб (I do not want without you). She also released her second single "Only one" under the pseudonym Dess after which she became the only singer nominated for pop folk awards, Nov folk, and pop awards, BG Radio. In the same year, she released her first duet song "It ain't over" with Alek Sandar.

In 2013 her song Baby was the anthem of Sofia Pride 2013. In the same year, Desislava went to Tirana, Albania to meet composer Alfred Sula. She bought a song from him – Play it again (Bulgarian: Пусни го пак). On her birthday she released her new song Усещам (I feel).

In the same year, Alek Sandar's song with her "You and me". There is a Bulgarian version called Az I ti.

In 2014, Desislava released Моето зайче (My bunny). She was chosen to be a coach in the third season of the reality talent show The Voice of Bulgaria on bTV. The winner of the show was Kristina Ivanova, was a singer in her team. In the same year, she released her duet featuring German rapper Nana Cotton Candy. Also in 2014, Desi Slava signed a contract with Payner and appeared at "13 years Planeta TV".

In 2015, she released her first song after returning to Payner, Не го прави (Don't do it). In the same year, she released В твоите очи (In your eyes), featuring Galena. On 11 June, 25 years of Payner, together with Galena, Preslava, Emilia, Anelia, and Tsvetelina Yaneva, present a new version of Лале ли си, зюмбюл ли си (You Are a Tulip, You are a Zymboul). A month later a video of the Dobrudja folk song was released. In the summer, the singer presents the song Започваме на чисто (We begin clean). At the beginning of September, the singer appeared in Konstantin's song От утре ще е друго (Tomorrow will be another).

In the beginning of 2016, she released В друг живот (In Another life. In the autumn of 2016 she released И на всички като тебе (And to everyone like you). At the end of the year, Desi Slava presented the ballad И това ще преживея (And I'll survive).

In 2017, the singer participated in the fifth season of the Imitation Show Като две капки вода, where she reached the finals and finished second.

In 2023 she appeared on Your face sounds familiar for every child in aid of UNICEF.

== Discography ==
- "No Problems" – 1998
- "Heads-Tails" – 2000
- "Forever" – 2001
- "Mystery" – 2002
- "Love Is Just A Feeling" – 2004
- "Together" – 2004
- "Hot Trail" – 2005
- "Sweet Dreams" – 2006
- "Listen To Your Heart" – 2009
- "Slavatronica" – 2012
- "Bulgaria in my soul" – 2025

== International performances ==
In 2007 Desislava was the first Bulgarian singer to perform at London's Soho Revue in a show titled "Cabaret Desislava". Desislava was the first Bulgarian singer to appear at the MAD Video Music Awards in 2008, alongside Kostas Martakis. In 2010, when Turkish pop star Mustafa Sandal was in Bulgaria, he invited Desislava join him in his concert. Also in 2010 Desislava was the only Bulgarian pop folk singer invited to sing with Ruse Philharmonic Orchestra and Burgas’ Philharmonic Orchestra. In 2012 Desislava was the only performer from Bulgaria to sing at the Balkan Awards' Media Music Awards.

== TV and film ==
- 2005: “Лъжа” (Lie) appeared on the soundtrack of Bulgarian film "Lady Z"
- 2007/2009: Desislava was the commercial face of the world's largest internet bookmaker Sportingbet. When she signed a contract the company's website was blocked for a short period because of a poker game with her, which caused unprecedented interest.
- 2008: She appeared in reality TV show "Let’s Duet"
- 2010: French television channel M6 made a documentary about "pop folk" including a large section about Desislava
- 2010: Desislava launched her own independent music TV channel, DSTV, giving new Bulgarian artists the opportunity to show their music. She sold it in June 2011, in order to focus more on her music career.
- 2011: Desislava took part in the Bulgarian sound of 3D "Rio" for 20th Century Fox.
- 2011: Desislava had a role in the film "Small – Large", directed by Yassen Grigorov, in partnership with the photographer Temelko Temelkov. The film was awarded a "Golden Rose".
- 2012: She had a role in the TV series "Столичани в повече”
- 2015: She won Big Brother All Stars

== Awards ==
Year	Organisation	Award	Result
1994	Slaveyche folk festival		First prize
1995	Petko Zaharieva folk festival		First prize
1996	Valkana Stoyanova folk festival		Grand Prix
1999	Golden Mustang festival	Live performance	Won
2000	World Arts Festival, Hollywood, USA	Hit of the year “Мъжете всичко искат” (Men want everything)	Won
2000	Trakia folk festival	Audience award for “Бели нощи” (White Nights)	Won
2000	Trakia folk festival	Jury award for “Бели нощи” (White Nights)	Won
2000	Hit Cocktail	Singer of the year	Won
2000	Hit Cocktail	Album of the year “Ези Тура”	Won
2000	Hit Cocktail	Hit of the year “Мила моя, мили мой”	Won
2000	Nov Folk magazine	Album of the year “Ези Тура”	Won
2000	Nov Folk magazine	Best hit singer of the year	Won
2000	Nov Folk magazine	Song of the year “Бели нощи” (White Nights)	Won
2002	Planet TV annual music awards	Singer of the year	Won
2002	Planet TV annual music awards	Best singer	Won
2002	Nov folk magazine	Singer of the year	Won
2002	Nov folk magazine	Album of the year “Мистерия” (Mystery)	Won
2002	Nov folk magazine	Best video clip “Две сърца” (Two Hearts)	Won
2004	Nov folk magazine	Best video clip “Жадувам” (I Crave)	Won
2004	Melo TV Mania	Video clip of the year “Бъди добро момче” (Be A Good Boy)	Won
2005	Nov folk magazine	Best duo for “Казваш че ме обичаш” (Say you love me)	Won
2005	Nov folk magazine	Best clip	Won
2006	Nov folk magazine	Music video of the year “Някой ден” (Some day)	Won
2006	Bliasuk magazine annual awards	Body of Bliasuk	Won
2007	FHM Magazine	The sexiest Bulgarian woman	Won
2007	Nov Folk Magazine	Best live performance	Won
2008	Radio Romantica Award	Best ballad “Някой ден” (Some day)	Won
2009	Nov folk magazine	Song of the decade “Бели нощи” (White nights) (1998–2008)	Won
2011	Radio Romantica Award	Eternal ballad “Забрави за мен” (Forget about me)	Won
2012	Radio Romantica Award	Best voice of radio Romantica	Won
2013	Radnevo Award	For those who have made significant and tangible contributions to the development and prosperity of the town of Radnevo.	Won
