= Iliyan =

- Gender: male

Origin
- Origin: Persian and Bulgarian
- Meaning: "My god is Yahu/Jah" (Hebrew meaning)

Other names
- Related names: Elijah, Ilija, Ilian, Ilya, Iliya, Ilia

Iliyan (Persian: ایلیان; Bulgarian: Илиян) is a Persian and Bulgarian form of the male Hebrew name Eliyahu (Elijah), meaning "My God is Yahu/Jah." It comes from the Byzantine Greek pronunciation of the vocative (Ilía) of the Greek Elias (Ηλίας, Ilías).

== People ==
- Iliyan Stefanov, (Bulgarian: Илиян Стефанов; born 20 September 1998) is a Bulgarian footballer
- Iliyan Mitsanski, (Bulgarian: Илиян Мицански; born 20 December 1985) is a Bulgarian professional footballer who plays as a striker
- Iliyan Boyden, Grandson of Agha Khan IV

== See also ==
- Ilija (given name)
- Ilias (name)
