= Gloria (Bulgarian singer) =

Gloria Глория
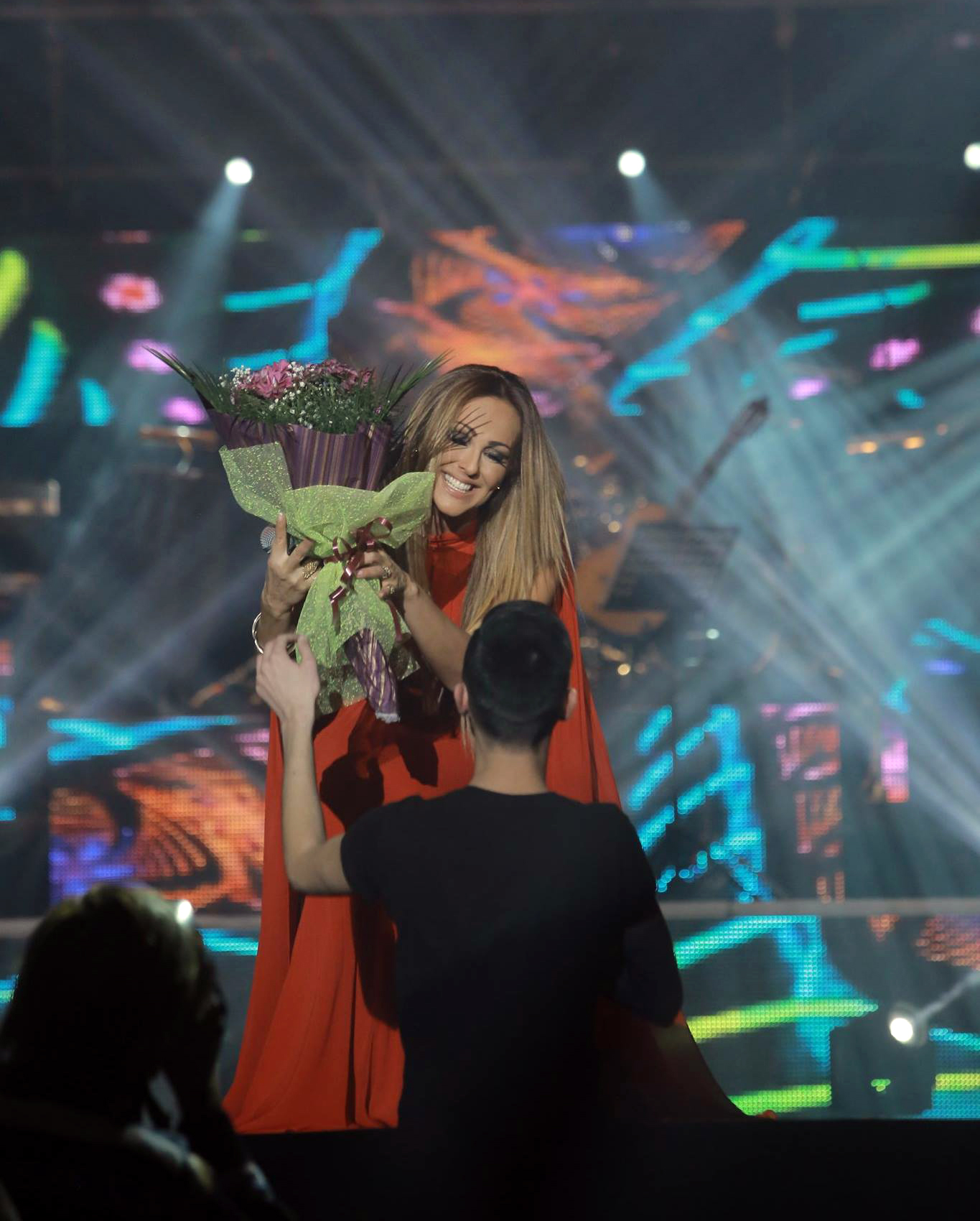
- 20 Years of Gloria, Jubilee Concert in the National Palace of Culture – 2015

Background information
- Born: 28 June 1973 (age 53); Ruse, Bulgaria
- Origin: Bulgaria
- Genres: Pop, Dance, Pop folk, Bulgarian traditional music
- Occupation: Singer
- Instrument: Vocals
- Years active: 1994–present
- Label: Payner

Galina Peneva Ivanova (Bulgarian: Галина Пенева Иванова), born 28 June 1973), known professionally as Gloria (Bulgarian: Глория), is a Bulgarian singer, sometimes referred to as the "Prima of Bulgarian pop-folk music". She was awarded the title Singer of the year in 1999, 2000, 2003 and 2004, and Singer of the decade in 2007. Gloria is the only representative of the pop-folk genre with 4 independent concerts in Hall 1 of the prestigious National Palace of Culture in Sofia.

== Early life ==
Gloria was born to Stefka Ivanova and Penko Ivanov on 28 June 1973 in Ruse, Bulgaria, and after her parents' divorce was raised with her brother by their grandparents in the town of Ruse.

== Music ==
Gloria has been a performer since 1992. Her debut album Щастието е Магия ("The Happiness is Magic") sold over 100 000 copies. За Добро или Зло ("For Good or Evil"), her second album, topped the charts with 400 000 – 500 000 copies, achieving a golden status in Bulgaria. In 2000 she released 12 Диаманта ("12 Diamonds"), which became certified as golden by The Bulgarian Association of Music Producers (BAMP). But perhaps the biggest hits in her career came with the release of her ninth album Крепост ("Fortress") in 2003. Her twelfth studio album Благодаря was released in Bulgaria in March 2007 and it sold over 16 000 physical copies within the first week of release.

Gloria has been a jury in Music Idol and participated in the reality show Dancing Stars. She has duets with the artists Azis and Toni Dacheva.

On her birthday (28 June) she surprised her fans with a new title – her album Пясъчни Кули (Sand Towers). The album topped the charts in Bulgaria for 6 following months.

Her best known songs are "Krepost" ("Fortress"), "Nostalgia", "Fenix", "Angel s dyavolska dusha" ("Angel with a Devil Soul"), "Ako biah se rodila reka" ("If I was born as a river"), "Iluzia" ("Illusion"), "Otkradnat mig" ("Stolen moment"), "Luboven dajd" ("Love rain"), "Ne sme bezgreshni" ("We are not sinless"), "Prisada" ("Sentence"), "Ako te nqma" ("If you are not here") and "Piasachni kuli" ("Sand towers").

== Discography ==
=== Albums ===
- Shtastieto e Magiya (The Happiness is Magic), 1994 (in Bulgarian – Щастието е магия)
- Za Dobro ili Zlo (For Good or Evil), 1995 (in Bulgarian – За добро или зло)
- Angel s Dyavolska Dusha (Angel with a Devil Soul), 1996 (in Bulgarian – Ангел с дяволска душа)
- Nostalgiya (Nostalgia), 1997 (in Bulgarian – Носталгия)
- 100% Zhena (100% Woman), 1998 (in Bulgarian – 100% жена)
- Gloria – The Best, 1999
- 12 Diyamanta (12 Diamonds), 2000 (in Bulgarian – 12 Диаманта)
- Iluziya (Illusion), 2001 (in Bulgarian – Илюзия)
- Krepost (Fortress), 2003 (in Bulgarian – Крепост)
- 10 Godini (10 Years), 2004 (in Bulgarian – 10 Години)
- Vlyubena v Zhivota (In Love with Life), 2005 (in Bulgarian – Влюбена в живота)
- Blagodarya (Thank You), 2007 (in Bulgarian – Благодаря)
- 15 Godini zlatni hitove (15 Years golden hits), 2009 (in Bulgarian – 15 Години златни хитове)
- Imam nuzhda ot teb (I need you), 2011 (in Bulgarian – Имам нужда от теб)
- Puteki (Paths), 2013 (in Bulgarian – Пътеки)
- Piasuchni Kuli (Sand Towers), 2015 (in Bulgarian – Пясъчни кули)
- Lubovta nastoqva (The love insists), 2019 (in Bulgarian - Любовта настоява)
- Nay-dobrite (The best ones), 2026 (in Bulgarian - Най-добрите)
- Zhiva e Bulgaria (Bulgaria is alive), 2026 (in Bulgarian - Жива е България)

=== Video albums ===
- Shtastieto e Magiya (The Happiness is Magic), 1995 (Bulgarian: Щастието е магия) (VHS)
- Za Dobro ili Zlo (For Good or Evil), 1996 (За добро или зло)(VHS)
- Nostalgiya (Nostalgia), 1997 (Носталгия) (VHS)
- 100% Zhena (100% Woman), 1998 (100% жена) (VHS)
- 12 Diyamanta (12 Diamonds), 2000 (12 Диаманта) (VHS)
- Best Video Selection I, 2003 (DVD, VHS)
- Krepost — Live (Fortress-Live),2003 (Крепост — Live) (DVD, VHS)
- Best Video Selection II, 2006 (DVD)
- Gloria-15 Godini(Gloria-15 Years), 2010(Глория – 15 години) (DVD)
- Best Video Selection III, 2012 (DVD)
- Gloria-20 Godini(Gloria-20 Years), 2016(Глория – 20 години) (DVD)

=== Singles since 1999 ===
- 1999
  - Погрешен адрес (Mistaken address)
  - Не мога без тебе (I can't with you)
  - Досаден ден (Tedious day)
  - Тайната на успеха (The secret of success)
  - Кукла на конци (Doll on thread)
  - Folk radio
  - Latino fiesta
- 2000
  - Златна клетка (Gold cage)
  - Червена светлина (Red lighting)
  - Сбогом, Adios (Goodbye Adios)
  - Дива нощ(Wild night)
  - Като куче и котка (Like dog and cat)
- 2001
  - Жените са цветя (Women are flowers) duet with Toni Dacheva
  - Илюзия (Illusion)
  - Ако бях се родила река (If I was born a river)
  - Добре дошъл (Welcome)
  - Любовен дъжд (Lovely rain)
  - Ledena kralitsa (Ice queen)
- 2002
  - Ne ostaryvai, mamo (Do not become old mother)
  - Po navik (Out of habit) duet with Iliya Zagorov
- 2003
  - Feniks (Phoenix)
  - Labirint (Labyrinth)
  - Krepost (Fortress)
  - Ochakvane (Anticipation)
  - Ne zaslushavash (You are undeserving)
- 2004
  - Ne sme bezgreshni (We're not without fault) duet with Azis
  - Prisyda (Sentence)
  - Nameri si maistora (You've found your master)
- 2005
  - Izpoved (Confession)
  - Vlyubena v zhivota (In love with life)
  - Spasenie (Saving)
  - Piyna vishna (Intoxicated morello)
  - 50 na 50 (50 on 50)
  - Svoboda (Freedom)
- 2006
  - Happy end
  - Obich moya (Love of mine)
  - Grad na greha (Sin city)
  - Prilicham li na vyatara? (Do I look like the wind?)
  - Sezoni (Seasons)
  - Krygovrat/Ne ostavljaj me (Rotation/Don't leave me) duet featuring the Serbian pop group Luna
  - Blagodarya (Thank you)
- 2007
  - Opiat (Opiate)
  - Ako te nyama (If you are not there)
  - 100 karata lyubov (100 carats of love)
  - Na mazhete koyto ne obichah (To the men I didn't love)
  - Za parvi pat (For the first time)
  - Pravi lyubov a ne voyna (Make love, not war) duet with Azis
- 2008
  - Ednoposochen pat (One Way Road)
  - Dyavolska lyubov (Devilish Love)
  - Useshtane za mazh (Feeling for a Man)
- 2009
  - Krasiv svyat (Beautiful world)
  - Mojesh li da me obicash? (Can You Love Me?)
  - Lyatno palnoludie (Summer full insanity)
  - Hipnoza (Hypnosis)
- 2010
  - Ostani (Tazi Nost) (Stay (This Night)) feat Deep Zone Project
  - Az ne placha (I don't cry) feat Deep Zone Project
  - Vyarvam v lyubovta (I Believe in Love)
  - Tseluvay oshte, (Kiss Me More)
  - Do poslednata salza (Until the last tear)
  - Pochti nepoznati (Almost unknown) duet with Iliyan
- 2011
  - Jenskoto sarce (The female heart)
  - Nenasitna (Insatiable)
- 2012
  - Kralitsa (Queen)
  - Dvoina igra (Double game)
