= Andrea (Bulgarian singer) =

Bulgarian pop-folk singer (born 1987)

Andrea Андреа
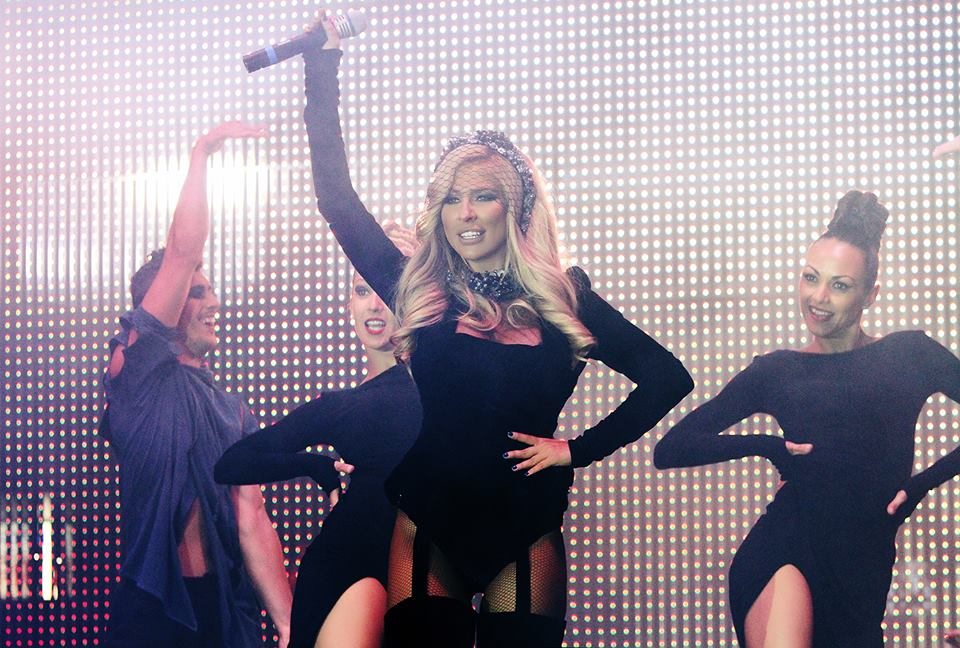

Background information
- Born: Teodora Rumenova Andreeva; 23 January 1987 (age 39); Sofia, Bulgaria
- Genres: Chalga; pop; dance; house; ethno-electro; techno-folk
- Occupations: Singer; actress
- Years active: 2006–present
- Labels: Roton; Payner; JHaps Records
- Formerly of: Sahara
- Website: andreasite.eu

Teodora Rumenova Andreeva (Bulgarian: Теодора Руменова Андреева; born 23 January 1987), better known by her stage name Andrea (Bulgarian: Андреа), is a Bulgarian pop-folk singer, songwriter and video director. She was also part of the famous group Sahara, together with the Romanian Grammy Awards nominated producer Costi Ioniță they created the song "I Wanna" in collaboration with Shaggy and Bob Sinclar. The song was distributed by Yellow Productions and Ministry of Sound Australia. The track was on the top charts of Belgium, Germany and Switzerland.

== Biography and lifestyle ==
Andrea was born in Sofia and raised in an unknown place. She took music lessons at an early age from her aunt who was an opera singer in the Vratsa Opera. During her teenage years she entered and won several beauty pageants (Miss Sofia, Miss Tourism Bulgaria).

After graduating high school, she signed with Bulgarian record label Payner.

In 2008, Andrea met Costi Ioniță and together they produced the track "Само мой". During the next year, they created the duo Sahara. Their next hit song "Tyalee" was released in 2009 and featured the artist Lenox Brown. The song was released worldwide and known abroad by the name "Tyalee", but by the name "Избирам теб" in Bulgaria. The English version of the song was produced by Cat Music and soon after Serdar Ortaç released a Turkish version with Sahara.

Sahara released another single called "Bellezza" with Buppy and Geo Da Silva. "Bellezza" and its Bulgarian version "Моята порода" was released in Romania, Bulgaria, Italy and France.

In 2010, Andrea released "Неблагодарен" and "Хайде опа".

Andrea and Costi then went to Miami to work on a new track, "I Wanna", performed with Bob Sinclar and Shaggy. "I Wanna" was released in 2010 in over 50 countries.

The next Sahara song was called "Mine" featuring American R&B singer Mario Winans.

She was a TV show host for 3 months on UTV Romania.

She followed up with the track "Champagne", featuring previous collaborator Shaggy.

In May 2012, she joined the biggest music company in Romania, Roton Music, where she released "Only You" in a duet with Gabriel Davi and a solo track "Hayati", produced by Adrian Sînă of Akcent.

Andrea appeared on the cover of the Italian fashion magazine Donna Salon International.

In 2014, Andrea released her song with Alek Sandar "Peaceful Place" in which both of them express their support for the LGBT community and their opposition towards discrimination on the basis of sexual orientation. CNN also mentioned Andrea's duet with Alek Sandar on Planeta TV Awards.

Andrea has won over 30 awards, such as Balkan Star award at the Beogradski Pobednik in Belgrade, European Performer of the Year at the Kraljevski Festival in Kraljevo, Balkan Star award at the Montefolk Awards in Montenegro.

== Discography ==
=== Studio albums ===
- Огън в кръвта (2008)
- Мен си търсил (2009)
- Андреа (2010)
- Лоша (2012)

=== Compilations ===
- The Best Selection (2009)
- Best Video Selection (2010)
- Andrea's Best Balkan Hits (2017)
- Poveche ot dumi (2023)
