= Tanya Boeva =

Bulgarian pop and Chalga singer

Tanya Boeva Таня Боева
- Born: Tanya Petrova Petkova; 3 November 1973 (age 52); Topolovgrad, Bulgaria
- Genres: Pop; chalga; pop-folk
- Occupation: Singer
- Years active: 1994–present
- Spouse: Mihail Burgudzhiev (m. 1999; div. 2018)
- Website: www.tanyaboeva.net

Tanya Petrova Petkova (Bulgarian: Таня Петрова Петкова; born 3 November 1973), better known simply as Tanya Boeva (Bulgarian: Таня Боева) is a Bulgarian pop and chalga singer. With a warm, gentle and velvety voice and also with her rich repertoire and genre diversity, she is a preferred performer for events such as weddings, birthdays and business parties. With enviable ease, she performs and goes through different genres: pop, modern pop-folk, Bulgarian folk music, Macedonian, Greek, Serbian. They call her "the universal performer".

In October 2023 she became a candidate for municipal council in Stara Zagora under the far-right and ultranationalist political party "Revival".

== Biography ==
Tanya Boeva was born on November 3, 1973, in the town of Topolovgrad, but lived, studied and grew up in Dimitrovgrad. She showed her musical talent at the age of two, and her parents noticed it. When she was 13, she started singing in a school group called "Alchemists", and later she sang in various pubs. With the same group she won her first prize - "Golden Badge", at a festival in Haskovo. The performer started her professional career in 1994 when she recorded several songs with the Dimitrovgrad Orchestra. In 1995, she took part in the then Golden Orpheus, where she won the Young Artist Award with the song Космичен блус (English: Cosmic Blues). The following year she again participated in the festival with the song Сребрее косата ти рано, мамо (English: Grab your hair early, Mom) in a duet with Daniela Petkova, and won second prize. [2] Following a contract with the music company Payner, Boeva released her debut album in 1997, containing only pop-songs. The album is called Обичай ме с нежност и душа English: Love me with tenderness and soul and the songs in it written by Dimitar Getov, Nayden Andreev, Vassil Iliev and Haigashod Agassyan. Boeva received popularity and success after working with her producers of Ara Audio with which she released the album Дама пика (English: Lady Peak) in 1999. Since 2002, Tanya Boeva has been a self-producing performer, with the exception of In a short period of time partnering with Ara Music, who have acted as her managers.

== Personal life ==
Tanya was married to Mihail Burgudzhiev and has a son called Rosen (now known in the rap sphere as Ro$ Dior )who was born in 2008. In 2011, Tanya gave birth to a second son, but he died 2 weeks afterwards from an unknown cause.

== Discography ==
- Obichaj me s nezhnost i dusha - 1997
- Shtastliva säm - 1998
- Dama pika - 1999
- Cherni ochi - 2000
- Shock - 2001
- Tanya Boeva - 2003
- Lutam Se - 2004
- Losho Momche - 2006
- Losha Terapia - 2010
