= Maria (Bulgarian singer) =

Maria Мария
- Born: Mariya Panayotova Kirova; 13 January 1982 (age 44); Stara Zagora, Bulgaria
- Genres: Pop-folk
- Occupation: Singer
- Years active: 2000–present

Mariya Panayotova Kirova (Bulgarian: Мария Панайотова Кирова; born 13 January 1982), better known mononymously as Maria (Bulgarian: Мария), is a Bulgarian pop-folk singer.

== Career ==
Maria made her debut on a children's show for young talents, where she sang a Lili Ivanova's song Detelini (Clovers). Her first media appearance is at the annual concert of Payner in Plovdiv in 2000. She released the albums "Спомен" and "Първа Луна" in 2000 and 2001. Her third album, "Истинска" (True to herself), was released in 2003, and the song "Обичай ме така" won the Golden Hit Fresh Award in the same year. At the 2003 Planeta TV Music Awards, Maria wins a special award to the general sponsors of the most engaging videos for the songs "Всичко си ти" and "Обичай ме така". Following are the albums "Maria - 2004", "Осъдена душа" (Damned Soul) and "Единствен" (The only one) in 2003, 2004, 2005 and 2006, respectively. The video clip "Твоят град" (Your City) won the award for Best Video at the 2004 Awards of "Planeta", and the song "I Do not Love You" won the 2006 Convert to the annual New Folk Music Awards.

She has been successful since then and has had many popular hits, including:

- "Спомен" (Spomen/Memory)
- "Първа луна" (English: First Moon)
- "Бисери в очите" (Biseri v ochite/Pearls in the eyes)
- "Родени за любов" (Rodeni za lyubov/Born for love)
- "Обич на заем" (Obich na zaem/Love for rent)
- "Искаш мойто тяло" (Iskash moyto tyalo/You want my body)
- "Обичай ме така" (Obichai me taka/Love me that way)
- "Край" (Kray/English: End)
- "За теб" (Za teb/For You)
- "Направи го" (Napravi go/Do it)
- "Желая те" (Zhelaya te/I desire you)
- "Не съвсем" (Ne suvsem/Not Really)
- "Не те обичам" (Ne te obicham/I don't love you)
- "Просто ти" (Prosto ti/Simply you)
- "Осъдена душа" (Osudena dusha/Damned soul)
- "Единствен" (Edinstven/The One)
- "Точно за мен" (Tochno za men/Right for Me)
- "Изпепелена" (Izpepelena/Prostrated)
- "Не ме обичай" (Ne me obichai/Don't Love Me)
- "Луд в любовта" (Lud v lubovta/Mad in love)
- "Не, не, не" (Ne, ne, ne/No, no, no)
- "Обичам само теб" (Obicham samo teb/Love Only You)
- "Най-доброто място" (Nay-dobroto myasto/The Best Place)
- "Ако бях заменима" (Ako byah zamenima/If I was replaceable)
- "Сладко, сладко" (Sladko, sladko/Honey, honey)
- "Мойте задръжки" (Moyte zadryzhki/My Obstacles)
- "Най-добрият" (Nay-dobriyat/The Best)
- "Дай жега" (Dai Zhega/Give heat)
- "Ти позна ли ме?" (Ti pozna li me/Did you recognise me)
- "Какво правим сега" (Kakvo pravim sega/What are we doing now) feat. Cvetelina Ianeva
- "Давай, ти си"(Davai, ti si/Come on, your turn)
- "Всичко е платено" (Vsichko e plateno/Everything is paid)
- "Още три" (Oshte tri/Three more)
- "Завърти се и върви си" (Zavurti se i vurvi si/Turn around and go away)

== Personal life ==
In 2006 she married Dimitar Andonov. On 28 July 2008 gave birth to their daughter Maraya. In 2011 they divorced.

In 2015 she married Hristian Gushterov. In 2017 they divorced.

In 2021 she married Miroslav Sokolov. In 2025 they divorced.

In 2025 she married Teodor Petkov.

== Discography ==
=== Studio albums ===
1. "Спомен", Spomen; (A Memory) (2000)
2. "Първа Луна", Parva Luna; (First Moon) (2001)
3. "Истинска", Istinska; (Real) (2003)
4. "Maria" (2004)
5. "Осъдена Душа", Osudena Dusha; (A Judged Soul) (2005)
6. "Единствен", Edinstven; (Unique) (2006)
7. "XIII", (2012)
8. "Tvoite 100 Litsa", Tvoite 100 Litsa; (Your 100 Faces) (2015)

== Concerts and commercials ==
Maria performed at Planeta Derby in 2004, 2005, 2006, 2009, 2010, and 2014.

In 2004, Maria featured in a 30-second television commercial for the beer Ariana (Bulgarian: Ариана) in which she appears to open a bottle with her breasts, but then reveals a bottle opener on a necklace. That won her the nickname Mara Otvarachkata (in Bulgarian otvarachka means bottle opener, and Mara is a short for Maria).
