= Galena (singer) =

Bulgarian singer (born 1985)

Galena Галена
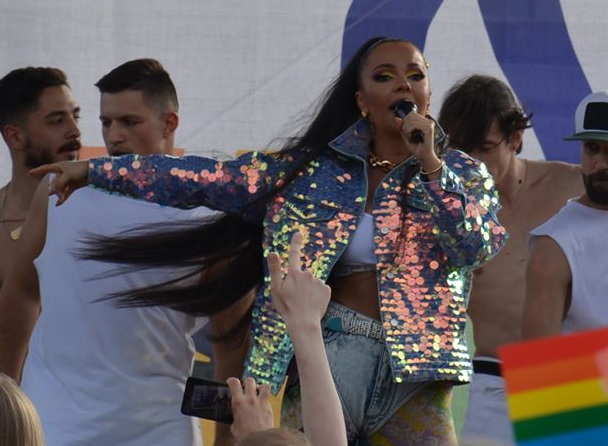
- Galena during Sofia Pride in 2019

Background information
- Born: Galina Vicheva Gencheva; 21 May 1985 (age 41); Smyadovo, Bulgaria
- Genres: Pop folk, dance pop, turbo-folk, pop
- Occupation: Singer
- Years active: 2003–present
- Label: Payner

Galina Vicheva Gencheva (Bulgarian: Галина Вичева Генчева) known professionally as Galena (Bulgarian: Галена), is a Bulgarian pop-folk singer.

== Biography ==
Galena was born May 21, 1985, in the village of Smyadovo, Bulgaria. She studied folk singing at the music school of Shumen for 4 years. Two years after that she moved town and continued her music education in Dimitrovgrad.

In February 2008, Galena was engaged to her boyfriend Galin. On June 22, 2009, they had their first child, Stefan. On February 17, 2017, they had a second son named Aleksandar.

In August 2026, Galena released a single titled "ChatGPT", wherein she implores her lover to ask the AI chatbot of the same name how much she loves him. The music video, which went viral, shows Galena dancing with humanoid robots and being attended to by a robot housekeeper and dog.
