= Emilia (Bulgarian singer) =

Emilia Емилия
- Born: Emilia Yancheva Valeva; 21 March 1982 (age 44); Galabovo, Bulgaria
- Genres: Pop folk, blue-eyed soul
- Occupation: Singer
- Years active: 1999–present
- Label: Payner

Emilia Bashur (Bulgarian: Емилия Башур, née Valeva), known mononymously as Emilia, is a Bulgarian pop folk singer. She has released eight studio albums to date.

== Early life ==
Emilia was born in Galabovo on 21 March 1982. She has one older sister, Daniela. Emilia became interested in music at an early age and began singing in the local choir. She began learning traditional Bulgarian music with Jivka Dimitrova and Dimitar Kolev. Several years later, she signed a contract with the Bulgarian record label Payner.

In 1999, she recorded her first song- "Its over with you" which became popular in the pop-folk culture. Her debut album Veselo Momiche (Happy Girl) was successful.

She has a son, Ivan and a daughter, Mira.

== Discography ==
=== Studio albums ===
- 2001: Весело Момиче (Veselo Momiče — Happy Girl)
- 2002: Нежни Устни (Nežni Ustni — Tender Lips)
- 2003: Ангел в Нощта (Angel v Nošta — Angel in the Night)
- 2005: Самотна Cтая (Samotna Staja — Lonely Room)
- 2006: Мисли за Mен (Misli za Men — Think About Me)
- 2008: Родена съм да те обичам (Rodena sym da te običam – I was born to love you)
- 2010: Така ми харесва (Taka mi haresva — I like that)
- 2012: Смелите си имат всичко (Smelite si imat vsičko — The Brave Have It All)
- 2015: Ех, Българийо красива (Eh, Bylgarijo krasiva — Ah, beautiful Bulgaria)
- 2020: Акула (Akula — Shark)
- 2023: Турбуленция (Turbulencija – Turbulence)

=== Greatest hits ===
- 2007: Целувай ме – Best Ballads (Tseluvay me – Kiss me)
- 2013: Златните хитове на Емилия (Zlatnite hitove na Emilia — Golden hits of Emilia)

=== Video albums ===
- 2006: Emilia Best Video Selection

== Planeta Tours ==
Emilia took part in Planeta Tours in 2004, 2005, 2006, 2007, 2009, 2010 and 2014.
