= Chalga =

Bulgarian music genre

- Stylistic origins: Bulgarian music; Serbian folk music; Greek folk music; Balkan folk music; Macedonian folk music; Arabesque; Balkan brass music; Balkan pop; dance-pop; pop
- Cultural origins: 1960s, Bulgaria

Chalga (Bulgarian: чалга), often referred to as pop-folk or ethno-pop, is a genre of Bulgarian pop music. Chalga is a folk-inspired dance music genre, with a blend of traditional Bulgarian music along with influences from Greek, Serbian, Turkish, Romani and Arabic music. It is heavily associated with the Bulgarian Romani ethnic minority. It is the most popular form of music in Bulgaria.

== Etymology ==
The name Chalga is derived from the Turkish word Çalgı, meaning "musical instrument".

== History ==
Although it originated in parallel with ex-Yugoslav turbofolk in the 1960s and 70s, contemporary Chalga music first emerged in 1989 after the collapse of the communist regime of Bulgaria, which persecuted musicians who played western or western influenced-styles. The political freedom that came with the fall of the Iron Curtain thus enabled Chalga to emerge and enjoy commercial success as a genre. Many conservative-minded figures in Bulgaria have criticized Chalga for its lyrical themes, often revolving around sexual liberation, youth culture, and glorification of wealth and capitalism, which critics considered morally corrupt. However, in the modern day, most Bulgarians have embraced Chlaga due to its liberal attitudes and alternative subculture, viewing it as an important piece of modern Bulgarian culture.

Throughout the Balkans, folk traditions have seen a process of modernization. Chalga has similarities with Greek Laiko and Turkish Arabesque music, a style with similar pop elements, incorporating Turkish music elements and lyrics, mixed with Arab influences due to religious and cultural similarities to between Turkey and the Arab world.

=== 1990s onwards: Surge in popularity ===
In 1989, when communism fell, restrictions on broadcasting Chalga/Pop-folk music were lifted. A new generation of musicians adopted the genre and grabbed the public spotlight, performing daring and overtly sexual songs that were formerly forbidden. Mass media attacked Chalga with a string of controversial sensational coverage. Though it was still widely considered "degenerate" and "lower class" music, it managed to gain popularity in the following decade. In the first years of the rise of Chalga, the melodies were influenced by Arabic, Turkish, Roma and Greek folk music featuring instruments such as zurna, clarinet, accordion and buzuki. The early Pop-folk divas and "kings", such as Toni Dacheva and Boni-singers of Kristal Orchestra - Gloria, Valdes, Rado Shisharkata and Sasho Roman, opened the way for uprising stars such as Sashka Vaseva, Desi Slava, Ivana, Kamelia, Reni, Extra Nina, Tsvetelina, Vesela, Joro Lyubimetsa. Although, some had only several years of success, many of the stars of the early Pop-folk years became icons for the genre. Several recording studios such as Payner Music and ARA Music offered consumers a steady stream of tracks every week on dedicated TV channels.

By the 2000s, Chalga's popularity greatly increased, in far greater proportion to its neighboring popular traditions of Serbian Turbo-folk or Greek Laïko. The processes of liberalization in the country allowed Chalga to deal openly with more provocative themes of sex, money, alcohol and drug use, and profanity in general similar in attitude to hip-hop music videos. In the 2000s, the Romani-Bulgarian musician Azis came to prominence with his provocative public displays of homosexuality along with more vulgar lyrics his songs, and his openly-queer presentation and unusual fashion style, playing a great role in both popularizing the genre and increasing its controversial status. His shocking public behaviour and announcements, alongside his undisputed musical talent boosted his fame. Many Bulgarians consider Azis as "The King of Chalga".

Today Pop-folk record companies collaborate with various partners, mainly from other Balkan countries, aligning with the world trends of RnB and hip-hop, as well as dance, techno, house, trap music, dubstep, dub, EDM and drum and bass, making this type of music having a more widespread appeal outside of Bulgaria.

== Criticism ==
Chalga has become popular in "Chalga dance clubs" and Chalga-oriented pubs or bars. Most Chalga clubs or Pop-folk clubs are called 'дискотека' (discotheque). Chalga clubs are sometimes the most busy venues in Sofia and touristic venues. But this apparent success and upsurge in popularity has invited great controversy about Chalga and its quick proliferation and has led to some musical and linguistic research, critical study, and heated public discussions about the subject.

Chalga proponents often claim Chalga or Pop-folk is the new Bulgarian folk music, but critics have argued that it lacks connection to any indigenous music traditions and that its origins are largely Middle Eastern. The Chalga industry promotes Chalga as having Bulgarian-roots to the local population and to tourists, with the latter accepting it as a novel approach to Balkan pop.

Chalga is often criticized for its "tawdriness", "loose morals", its so-called "disconnection from Bulgarian music tradition"s (i.e. its Middle Eastern, Arabic, Arabesque roots), and its sexually explicit lyrics. In addition, the Chalga industry has been criticized for "exploiting women and degrading them through sexism".

Chalga music videos often feature a wealthy man who spends money on promiscuous women and insinuate that they engage in indiscriminate sexual acts.

Chalga venues are largely criticized for not regulating entry by underage individuals and for failing to protect its customers from sexual assault by promoting sexual interactions. Chalga venues also do not regulate distribution of illicit drugs and are related to smuggling and drug-trafficking. Some artists, performers, and musicians shun the Chalga industry for undermining music creativity by encouraging formulaic and predictable music, plagiarism, and lewd lyrics.

In addition, many Chalga critics claim the genre is made predominately for the minority Gypsy people.

There has been a long, intensive and very hostile rivalry between Chalga fans (or 'chalgadzhii'/'chalgari' (the latter is sometimes used as a derogatory term) and heavy metal fans (or metalheads) in Bulgaria, due to genre and their respective subculture differences. Bulgarian metalheads tend to oppose Chalga due to its 'ethnic backwardness', proving that 'capitalism is only another modernist lie'.

== Lyrics and music videos ==
Modern-day Chalga or pop-folk lyrics and music videos have overwhelmingly liberal sexual content. The texts and/or lyrics, although sung primarily in Bulgarian, can be sung interchangeably in many languages and Bulgarian Chalga or Bulgarian Pop-folk have been subject of covers in a multiple of languages. But even in Bulgarian Chalga, sometimes especially in duet with foreign singer the actual Chalga song lyrics do contain a mixture of many languages – Bulgarian often mixed with some lyrics in Serbian, Albanian, Turkish, Romani, Greek, Romanian, Arabic and more recently with some lyrics in English, Russian, French, Spanish, Italian and German.

Because of its appeal and thanks to Bulgarian music television channels like Balkanika TV, Fan TV and Planeta TV, Chalga has become popular in other Balkan countries, notably North Macedonia, Greece, Romania, Albania, Serbia, Kosovo, Montenegro, Bosnia and Herzegovina, Turkey, and to a lesser extent in the post-Soviet nations of Russia, Ukraine, Moldova, Georgia, Armenia and Azerbaijan.

== See also ==
- Byzantine music
- Arabesque (Turkish music)
- Laïko
- Manele
- Skiladiko
- Turbo-folk
- Rabiz
- Arabic pop music
- Mizrahi music
- Tallava
- Čalgija
- Disco polo
- Eurodance
- Music of Lebanon
- Arabic music
