= Payner =

- Founded: 1990
- Founder: Mitko Dimitrov
- Genre: Pop folk, Pop, Folklore and others.
- Country of origin: Bulgaria
- Location: Dimitrovgrad
- Official website: http://www.payner.bg

Payner LTD (Bulgarian: "Пaйнер" ООД) is an independent Bulgarian record label and production company. It was founded in 1990 by Bulgarian businessman Mitko Dimitrov. It is often referred as the largest in size record label in terms of roster within the country with over 100 artists currently signed. Originally Payner started with the production of audio and videotapes for the Bulgarian market and for exportations abroad. As of today, the company owns their own record studio, founded in 1995. 3 television channels - Planeta TV since 2001, Planeta Folk since 2007, Planeta HD since 2010 and Planeta 4K since 2020. As well as 2 complexes - "Prikazkite" in Harmanli. Bulgaria and "Planeta Payner" in Dimitrovgrad.

Production facilities and the head office of Payner LTD are situated in Dimitrovgrad.

At the end of April 2026, the company was acquired by Macedonian composer and founder of Hit Mix Music and Hit Mix TV, Jordančo Vasilkovski—known in the industry as Ocko—who joined forces with the largest independent record label and distribution company in the region, Yellowcake Music Group.
