= Walltopia =

Bulgarian active entertainment manufacturer

Walltopia AD Уолтопия АД
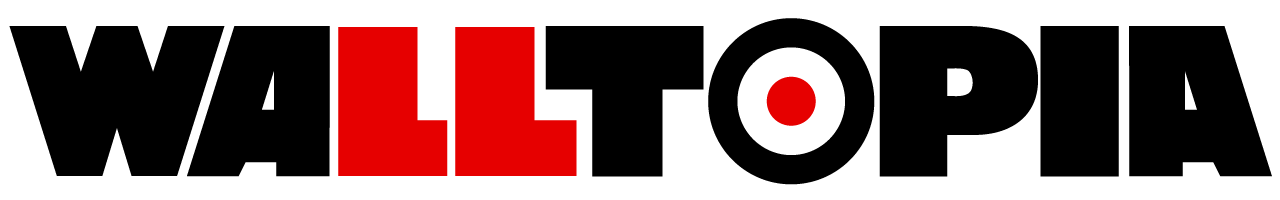
- Company type: Private
- Industry: Climbing; Adventure park
- Founded: 1998; 28 years ago
- Founders: Ivaylo Penchev; Metin Musov
- Headquarters: Sofia, Bulgaria
- Area served: Worldwide
- Key people: Ivaylo Penchev (CEO); Metin Musov (CEO)
- Products: Climbing walls; Ropes courses; Obstacle courses; Amusement rides
- Brands: Funtopia; Rollglider
- Number of employees: ~650 (2015)
- Divisions: Walltopia Climbing; Walltopia Active Entertainment
- Subsidiaries: Momentum Indoor Climbing; Adventure Facility Concepts & Management; ABC Kids Climbing
- Website: www.walltopia.com

Walltopia AD is a Bulgarian climbing wall and active entertainment manufacturer. It was founded in 1998 by Ivaylo Penchev and Metin Musov. Originally exclusively a climbing wall and other artificial rock surfaces manufacturer, since 2012 the company portfolio expanded into adventure park concepts and management.

Walltopia is currently the largest manufacturer of artificial climbing walls in the world by volume.

== History ==
=== Founding and international growth (1998-2010) ===
Walltopia was founded in 1998 by Ivaylo Penchev and Metin Musov. Prior to the establishment of the company, the two were climbers, both from Veliko Tarnovo. The company began as a manufacturer of climbing walls, immediately taking on projects outside of Bulgaria due to low local demand. They opened their first foreign office in late 2006 in the United Kingdom. In 2006, they introduced mobile climbing walls and in 2007 they branched out to develop artificial rock surfaces not exclusively for climbing, but also for cosmetic purposes. They opened their United States office in early 2008, which has since become their largest foreign office by revenue. Since then, the company has opened foreign offices in multiple other major markets.

=== Branching out and strategic acquisitions (2010-Present) ===
In 2010, Walltopia opened a manufacturing plant in Letnitsa, and in 2012 expanded it to grow its production capacity. In 2012, the company branched out of traditional climbing walls and introduced amusement climbing walls aimed at children and climbing beginners, under the brand Fun Walls, and rope courses, under the brand Ropetopia.

In 2013, the company established the operations subsidiary Adventure Facility Concepts & Management, opening their first owned and operated location under the Funtopia brand in the middle of that year in Paradise Center in Sofia, Bulgaria. Since then, new Funtopia locations have been opened in North America, Australia and the Middle East, some owned and operated by them, others franchised to local partners.

That same year, the company's portfolio expanded into amusement rides with Rollglider, a suspended ride with a steel track. In 2014, the company began construction of its new headquarters in Sofia Tech Park, becoming the first private investor to build in the park.

Walltopia introduced Harmonized Walls and e-walls in mid-2015. Later that year, the company received investments from two equity funds, Bulgarian private equity fund BlackPeak Capital and Chinese equity fund China-CEE. This facilitated their investment in Salt Lake City-based climbing gym chain Momentum. Additionally, they opened a manufacturing facility for their newly introduced climbing mat production, under the brand Climbmat, and an R&D facility for adventure park-related products near Sofia in the Bozhurishte economic zone.

In 2016, the company added obstacle courses to its portfolio of adventure park products under the brand Ninja Course. In December of that year, the company moved into their new office building. In April 2017, Walltopia opened its flagship gym inside its new office building under the name Walltopa Climbing & Fitness.

In 2019, Walltopia finished construction on the world's tallest indoor climbing wall, at 43 meters, part of indoor adventure venue Clymb Abu Dhabi on the leisure island Yas Island in Abu Dhabi, United Arab Emirates. In 2020, they finished construction on the world's tallest outdoor climbing wall, measuring 85 meters, scaling the side of Copenhill in Copenhagen, Denmark.

In 2023, Walltopia acquired a majority stake in Boulder, Colorado-based kids climbing gym ABC Kids Climbing, founded by Robyn Erbesfield-Raboutou.

== Controversies ==
=== Sofia Tech Park ===
In 2017, the company's CEO Ivaylo Penchev sent out an open letter to the administration behind Sofia Tech Park, claiming that they were attempting to fine Walltopia for a delay the Mladost municipality had caused and that they had failed to deliver on their promises, concluding that the park is a failure. He also mentioned the Bozhurishte economic zone's failure to supply their factory with electricity in time.

Following the open letter, all members of the park's leadership were let go, a decision which the Ministry of Economy of Bulgaria claimed was unrelated to the letter.

=== Arson attack ===
In 2020, Walltopia headquarters suffered an arson attack targeting the pride flag which the company had hung from its office's facade in support of Sofia Pride. Walltopia had previously received attention for displaying the 21-meter rainbow flag in support of the parade starting in 2018.
