= Healthcare in Malta =

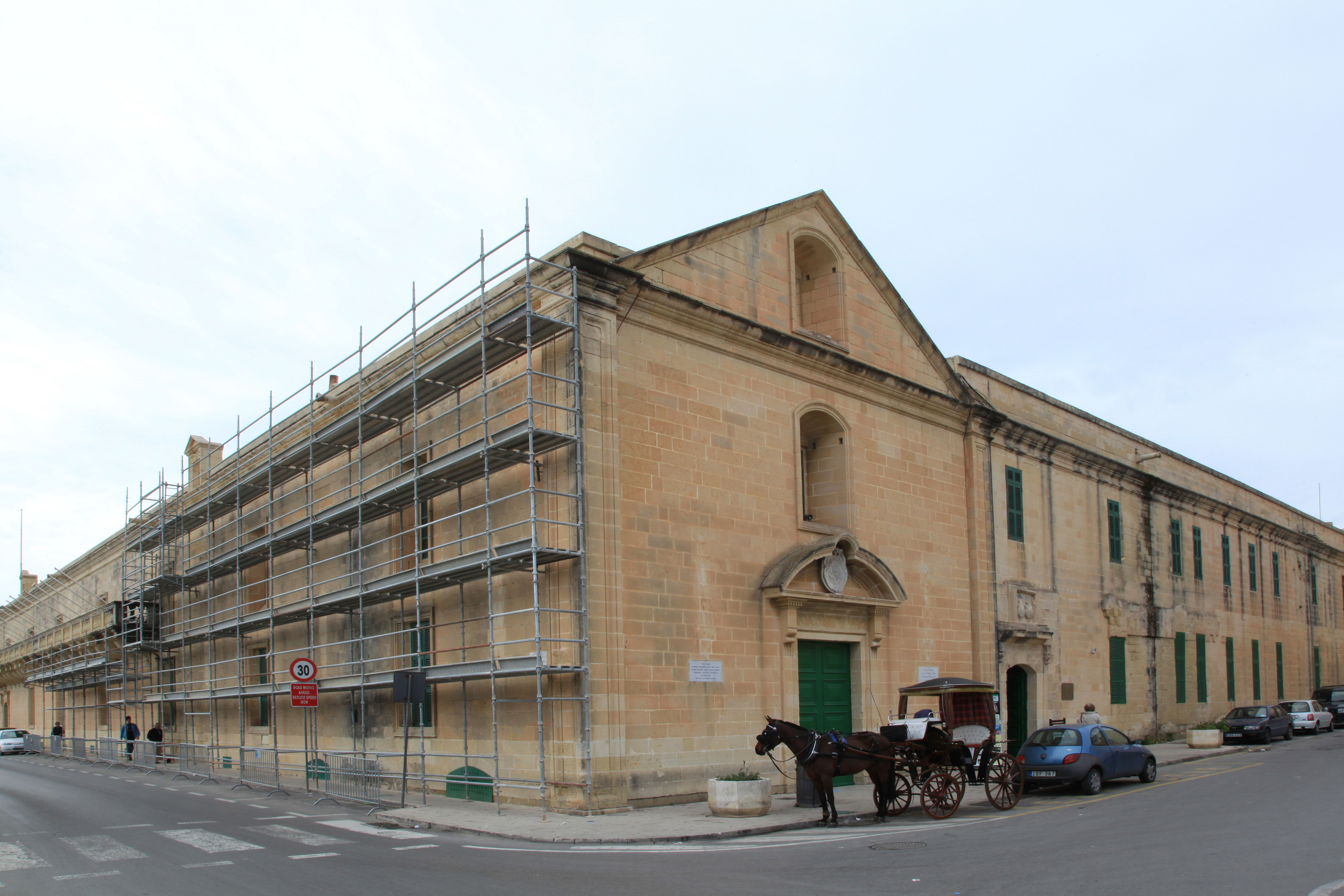
The Sacra Infermeria was used as a hospital from the 16th to 20th centuries. It is now the Mediterranean Conference Centre.

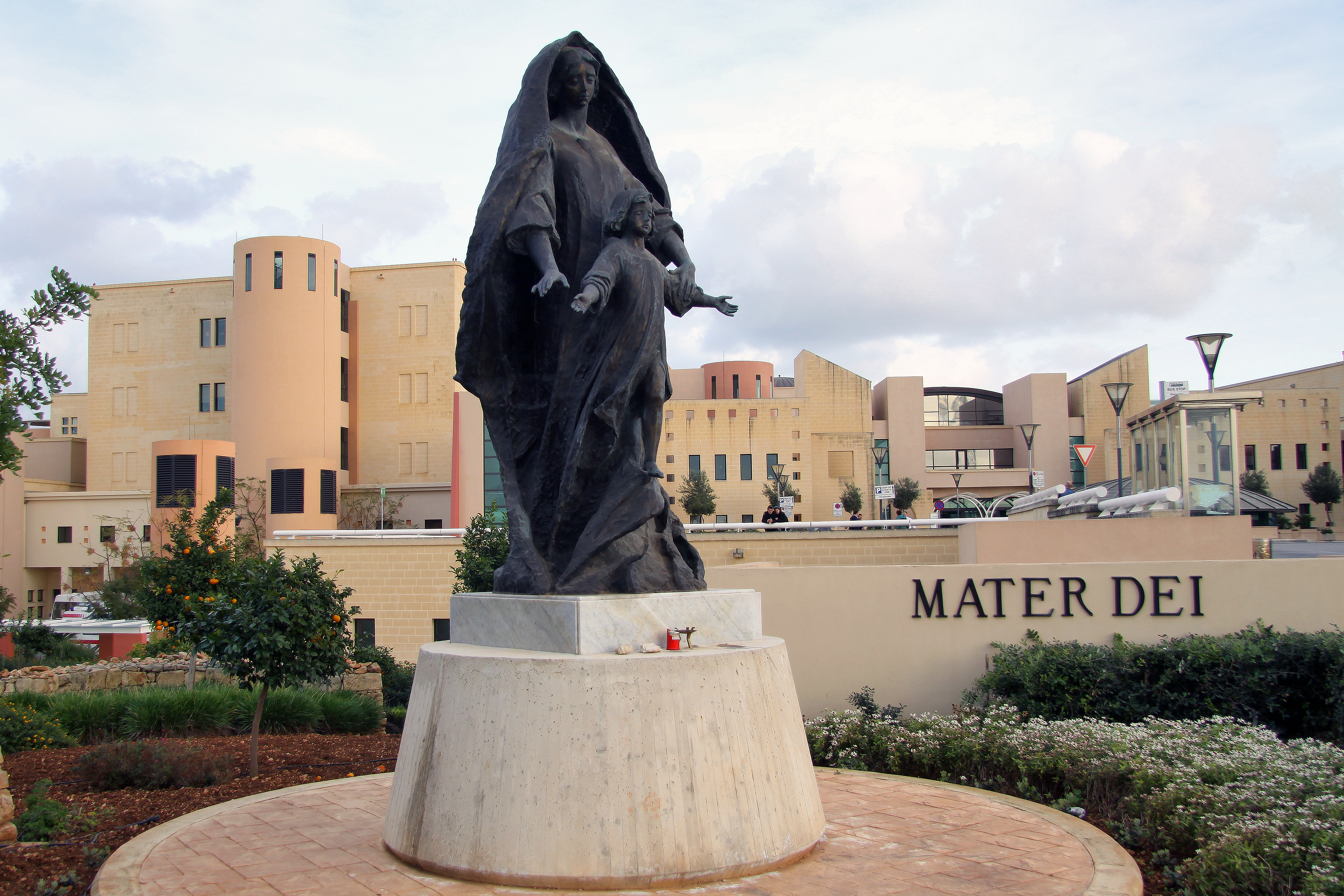
Mater Dei Hospital

Malta has a long history of providing publicly funded health care. The first hospital recorded in the country was already functioning by 1372. Today, Malta has both a public healthcare system, known as the government healthcare service, where healthcare is free at the point of delivery, and a private healthcare system. Malta has a strong general practitioner-delivered primary care base and the public hospitals provide secondary and tertiary care. The Maltese Ministry of Health advises foreign residents to take out private medical insurance.

== Comparisons ==
In 2000, Malta was ranked number five in the World Health Organization's ranking of the world's health systems, compared to the United States (at 37), Australia (at 32), United Kingdom (at 18) and Canada (at 30). The healthcare system in Malta closely resembles the British system, as healthcare is free at the point of delivery.

It moved up four places in the Euro health consumer index from position 27 in 2014 to 23 in 2015. It was said to have decent accessibility to healthcare, but indifferent treatment results.

== Facilities ==
The Mater Dei Hospital, Malta's primary hospital, opened in 2007. It has one of the largest medical buildings in Europe.

The University of Malta has a medical school and a Faculty of Health Sciences, the latter offering diploma, degree (BSc) and postgraduate degree courses in a number of health care disciplines.

Malta also has voluntary organisations such as the Emergency Fire & Rescue Unit (E.F.R.U.), St John Ambulance and Red Cross Malta who provide first aid services during events involving crowds.

The Medical Association of Malta represents practitioners of the medical profession. The Malta Medical Students' Association (MMSA) is a separate body representing Maltese medical students, and is a member of EMSA and IFMSA. MIME, the Maltese Institute for Medical Education, is an institute set up recently to provide CME to physicians in Malta as well as medical students. The Foundation Program followed in the UK has been introduced in Malta to stem the 'brain drain' of newly graduated physicians to the British Isles. The Malta Association of Dental Students (MADS) is a student association set up to promote the rights of Dental Surgery Students studying within the faculty of Dental Surgery of the University of Malta. It is affiliated with IADS, the International Association of Dental Students.

A 30-year concession on healthcare services in the Gozo, Karin Grech and St Lukes hospitals was granted to Vitals Global Healthcare in 2015. The Medical Association of Malta objected because of "the complete lack of experience of the operator, and the dangers of government relinquishing its control of management and the resulting profit motive.” In January 2018 it was transferred to Steward Global Healthcare and precipitated a doctors' strike.

== See also ==
- List of hospitals in Malta
- Health in Malta
- Abortion in Malta
