= Funtopia =

Chain of family entertainment centers

- Company type: Private company
- Industry: Family entertainment centers
- Founded: 2013; 13 years ago
- Headquarters: Sofia, Bulgaria
- Number of locations: 11
- Key people: Ivaylo Penchev (CEO); Tanya Kishkin (CEO)
- Owner: Walltopia
- Parent: Adventure Facility Concepts & Management
- Website: www.funtopiaworld.com

Funtopia is an international chain of family entertainment centers headquartered in Sofia, Bulgaria, owned by Adventure Facility Concepts & Management, a subsidiary of Bulgarian climbing wall and active entertainment manufacturer Walltopia. Funtopia centers feature amusement climbing walls, trampoline parks, ropes courses, and obstacle courses.

The first Funtopia location opened in 2013 in Sofia, and the chain currently has 11 locations in 5 countries, including both corporate-owned and franchised sites.

== History ==
Following Walltopia's entry into the manufacturing of active entertainment products in 2012, the company founded Adventure Facility Concepts & Management (AFCM), its family entertainment center operation and franchising arm. The first Funtopia center run by AFCM opened in June, 2013 in Paradise Center in Sofia, Bulgaria. It featured mainly amusement climbing walls targeting children and teenagers.

In 2014, the chain expanded into the United States with its first franchised location in Lehi in Utah, with two corporate locations following in the years after, both in Chicago, Illinois. The following year, Funtopia centers opened in Canada and Israel, with the chain expanding into Australia and Malaysia in 2016. The company most recently opened its first location in Oman in 2022, after finishing it in 2020 but facing delays caused by the coronavirus pandemic.

After starting with a focus almost exclusively on themed amusement climbing walls, the selection of attractions at Funtopia locations has grown over time to include trampoline parks, ropes courses, and obstacle courses, among others.

== Operations ==
Funtopia is headquartered in Sofia, Bulgaria, with 11 centers currently operational in five markets, including Bulgaria, the United States, Australia, Israel, and Oman. It is owned by Adventure Facility Concepts & Management, itself a subsidiary of Walltopia. The chain previously had locations in Canada and Malaysia.

== See also ==
- Family entertainment center
