= LGBTQ rights in Bulgaria =

- Location of Bulgaria (dark green) – in Europe (light green & dark grey) – in the European Union (light green) – [Legend]
- Legal status: Legal from 1858 (as part of the Ottoman Empire) to 1879; Legal since 1968, age of consent equalized in 2002
- Gender identity: Transgender individuals not allowed to change their legal gender due to a supreme court ruling in 2023
- Military: Homosexual men, women, and bisexual people are allowed to serve
- Discrimination protections: Protections in all areas since 2004 and 2015 (see below)

Family rights
- Recognition of relationships: No recognition of same-sex relationships
- Restrictions: Same-sex marriage constitutionally banned
- Adoption: Single LGBT individuals can adopt

Lesbian, gay, bisexual, and transgender (LGBT) people in Bulgaria face significant challenges not experienced by non-LGBT residents. Both male and female same-sex relationships are legal in Bulgaria, but same-sex couples and households headed by same-sex couples are not eligible for the same legal protections available to opposite-sex couples. Discrimination on the basis of sexual orientation has been banned since 2004, with discrimination based on "gender change" being outlawed since 2015. In 2019, a Bulgarian court recognized a same-sex marriage performed in France. Contrastingly, in 2024, Bulgaria's parliament prohibited the "propaganda, and promotion of non-traditional sexual orientation and/or gender identity other than the biological one" in schools.

For 2020, Bulgaria was ranked 37 of 49 European countries for LGBT rights protection by ILGA-Europe. Like most countries in Central and Eastern Europe, post-Communist Bulgaria holds socially conservative attitudes when it comes to such matters as homosexuality and transgender people.

== Legality of same-sex sexual activity ==
=== Pre-Independence ===
Homosexuality was legalized in 1858 in all parts of the Ottoman Empire. After the Liberation of Bulgaria, however, homosexuality was recriminalized with the adoption of a new constitution in 1879.

=== 1878–1968 ===
Following the liberation of Bulgaria in 1878, the country's Penal Code came into force on 1 May 1896, and homosexual acts between males over 16 years of age became punishable by at least six months of imprisonment. The Penal Code of 13 March 1951 increased the penalty to up to three years in jail. The revised Penal Code of 1 May 1968 removed the sections outlawing homosexual acts.

=== July 1964 trial ===
In July 1964, 26 men were arrested and accused of having "perverted homosexual relationships". Some of the arrested were the famous actor Georgi Partsalev and widely popular Bulgarian singer, Emil Dimitrov. Experts say that the process was a masquerade for the public so that "people will understand how decadent the Western culture is". In the 1960s, there were a couple of other similar cases which again involved some of Bulgaria's elite. Later in 1966, when revising the Penal Code, a group of "experts" decided that homosexual acts would no longer be considered a crime because lesbians and gays "are ill people, who shouldn't be punished because of the sufferings they are already going through (due to their illness)". On 1 May 1968, the Penal Code was revised, and homosexuality became legal.

Since 2002, the age of consent has been 14, regardless of the sexes of the consenting parties.

Since 2026, the age of consent in Bulgaria is 16, regardless of sexual orientation.

== Recognition of same-sex relationships ==
In September 2023, the European Court of Human Rights says that Bulgaria not recognising same-sex couples is an "infringement of human rights". This case is subject to appeals and awaiting a government response. Since 1991, Article 46 of the Bulgarian Constitution has defined marriage as a union between a man and a woman, therefore explicitly banning same-sex marriage. The Constitution does not ban civil unions or other forms of relationship recognition.

In 2012, on the question if same-sex couples will soon have further rights like the right to marry or adopt children, now-former Prime Minister Boyko Borisov said: "for something [like this] to happen, society needs to become ready for it." There have been several debates on whether to recognise civil unions or registered partnerships, which would grant same-sex couples some of the rights and benefits of marriage, including the right to inherit, to make medical decisions, to own property together; all of which are currently denied to same-sex couples.

In 2017, a Bulgarian same-sex couple, who married in the United Kingdom, filed a lawsuit in order to have their marriage recognised. The Sofia Administrative Court rejected their case in January 2018. However, lawyers from the Bulgarian LGBT organisation Deystvie (Действие) appealed against this decision. Deystvie has begun collecting public signatures in favor of their appeal.

Citing Coman and Others v General Inspectorate for Immigration and Ministry of the Interior, a case originating from Romania in which the European Court of Justice ruled that same-sex couples must be granted full residency rights in all EU countries, a Sofia court granted a same-sex couple the right to live in Bulgaria on 29 June 2018. The couple, an Australian woman and her French wife, had married in France in 2016, but were denied residency in Bulgaria a year later when they attempted to move there.

== Adoption and parenting ==
Same-sex couples are banned from adopting in Bulgaria. However, single individuals regardless of sexual orientation are allowed to adopt, though requests from single men are rarely accepted. Lesbian couples do not have access to IVF and artificial insemination, as it is only available to married opposite-sex couples. Nevertheless, since 2004, single lesbian women have had access to IVF.

In 2021 the European Court of Justice (ECJ) heard a case involving a baby born to a lesbian couple (one Bulgarian and the other a British citizen) in Spain. The baby was not entitled to either British or Spanish citizenship so the couple applied for Bulgarian citizenship for their child. Because the Bulgarian authorities refused to issue a birth certificate, the child was denied the benefits of European citizenship, became stateless, and has not been able to leave Spain. In December 2021, the ECJ ruled against Bulgaria in the case, finding that the country had to issue an ID card based on the parentage established by Spain so that the child could exercise her right to European citizenship.

== Discrimination protections ==
Since 1 January 2004, the Protection Against Discrimination Act of 2003 (Bulgarian: Закон за защита от дискриминация) has prohibited discrimination and hate speech on the basis of sexual orientation in all areas (employment, the provision of goods and services, education, military service, health services, etc.). Under the law, sexual orientation is defined as "heterosexual, homosexual or bisexual orientation".

In 2015, the National Assembly amended the definition of "sex" in the law to include cases of gender change. Transgender people who have not undergone a legal gender change could use "gender" from the list of protected grounds. Gender expression and gender identity are not explicitly mentioned in the revised Act.

=== Hate crimes ===
Hate crimes against LGBT people are not uncommon in Bulgaria, and are often ignored and go uninvestigated by authorities. In 2008, a 25-year-old student perceived to be gay was killed in a park in Sofia. During the investigation, a man testified that the two suspects were part of a group intending to "cleanse" the park of gays. On 27 September 2020, children as young as 14 or 15 were assaulted in Plovdiv, as part of an anti-LGBT "cleansing action" apparently done by ultra fans of Botev.

In January 2014, the Government committed itself to outlaw hate crimes against LGBT people. However, following parliamentary elections in October 2014, the newly established Government was silent on the issue.

On 28 July 2023, the National Assembly adopted a Law on Amendments and Supplements to the Criminal Code, which provides for heavier penalties for crimes committed on the basis of the victim's sexual orientation.

== Gender identity and expression ==
The Bulgarian Personal Documents Act (Bulgarian: Закон за българските лични документи), which came into effect on 1 April 1999, was the first law in Bulgaria regulating sex changes; it however has since been overruled by the Supreme Court of Cassation. There is no official data on the number of Bulgarians who have legally changed their gender. When a person undergoes sex reassignment surgery, they were able to change their passport, driver's license, personal identity document, birth certificate and uniform civil number to match their new sex. In 2016, however, three transgender women were allowed to change gender without undergoing surgery.

A 2015 Eurobarometer survey found that 29% of Bulgarians agreed with the statement that transgender people should be able to change their civil documents in order to match their actual gender identity.

After the Constitutional Court's verdict on the Istanbul Convention, in which the court condemned attempts to introduce legislation for legal gender recognition, a transgender woman's application to change gender was rejected by a regional court.

An interpretative decision published by the Bulgarian Supreme Court of Cassation on 20 February 2023 states that "the only meaning of the term sex should be its biological one", and that "the [Bulgarian] Constitution and the entire legal system are based on the binary existence of humankind", thus effectively prohibiting the change of legal gender on a biological basis. (lit. translation)

== Intersex rights ==
There is no data of the number of intersex babies born in the country. The standard procedure in a case of an intersex child birth is the removal of the male genitalia due to the fact that it is an easier operation than the one removing the female genitalia. The parents are rarely informed of the damages this could later cause to the child's gender identity. There are no laws concerning intersex people.

== Military service ==
Bulgaria's Protection Against Discrimination Act of 2003 protects individuals from discrimination on the grounds of sexual orientation in relation to recruitment to the military.

== Blood donation ==
Gay and bisexual men are not explicitly banned from donating blood in Bulgaria. However, the blood donor application form, required prior to any blood donation, does not ask the applicant to disclose that information, rather requires them to confirm that they did not partake in practices (sexual included) that increase the risk of HIV or other STIs. The consent form is detailed in an ordinance issued by Bulgaria's Ministry of Healthcare on 19 July 2004.

== 2024 anti-LGBT legislation ==
On 7 August 2024, Bulgaria's parliament approved an amendment to the education law that prohibits the "propaganda, promotion, or incitement in any way, directly or indirectly, in the education system of ideas and views related to non-traditional sexual orientation and/or gender identity other than the biological one". The amendment, introduced by Revival party, defines "non-traditional sexual orientation" as "contrary to Bulgaria's legal concept of emotional, romantic, sexual or sensual attraction between persons of opposite sexes". Balkan Insight noted that the bill passed largely because of the surprising backing of the country's largest pro-EU GERB party. The bill was signed into law by President Rumen Radev and entered into force on 16 August 2024.

7 August 2024 vote in the National Assembly
| Party | Voted for | Voted against | Abstained | Absent |
|---|---|---|---|---|
| GERB–SDS | 51 | 6 | 4 | 7 |
| PP–DB | – | 33 | – | 6 |
| Revival | 38 | – | – | – |
| DPS | – | 18 | – | 4 |
| BSPzB | 15 | – | – | 3 |
| ITN | 16 | – | – | – |
| Independent | 19 | – | – | 20 |
| Total | 139 | 57 | 4 | 40 |

== Public opinion ==
A 2002 Pew Global Attitudes Project survey recorded that 63% of Bulgarians were "openly homophobic" and against LGBT people, and the 2007 Pew Global Attitudes Project survey recorded that acceptance of the LGBT community had risen to 39%.

A 2006 European Union poll showed that 15% of Bulgarians supported same-sex marriage, with 65% opposed to it. In 2015, those numbers remained almost the same, with 17% supporting same-sex marriage and 68% being opposed.

According to a survey in 2007 by Skala, a sociological agency, 42.4% of Bulgarians would not like having a homosexual friend or colleague. 46% answered that it would be unacceptable if their own child was gay or lesbian. A Eurobarometer survey from 2015 showed that 9% of Bulgarian parents would accept their child being in a same-sex relationship.

According to a 2008 survey, conducted in 15 schools throughout Sofia, Varna and Plovdiv, 10.5% of students identified as bisexual, whereas 1.8% identified as gay and 87.7% as straight. Of these students, 15% said they would not want a gay friend and 29% said they would categorically refuse to sit next to a gay classmate. 5% said they would bully gay classmates, while 39% said they would protect them from bullying.

A survey from 2012 showed the number of people who would not like having a homosexual colleague had dropped to 38%. The survey also showed that Bulgarians were more tolerant toward lesbians than gay men. 26% of the respondents would not hire a lesbian.

A Pew Research Center published in May 2017 suggested that 18% of Bulgarians were in favor of same-sex marriage, while 79% opposed it. Support was higher among Orthodox Christians (19%) and 18–34 year olds (26%), in contrast to Muslims (12%) and people aged 35 and over (15%). While just 27% believe there is nothing wrong with same-sex relationships, a 2015 Eurobarometer survey reported that 51% supported equal rights.

A GLOBSEC survey conducted in March 2023 showed that 21% of Bulgarians supported same-sex marriage, while 69% were opposed.

The 2023 Eurobarometer found that 17% of Bulgarians thought same-sex marriage should be allowed throughout Europe, and 21% agreed that "there is nothing wrong in a sexual relationship between two persons of the same sex".

== Living conditions ==
Most of gay life in Bulgaria is primarily set in Sofia. There are gay establishments in Plovdiv, Varna and Blagoevgrad. Outside of the big cities, the subject is a taboo and rarely welcomed or admitted to be relevant or real. As this is still a highly controversial subject in Bulgaria, accurate data cannot be obtained due to the unwillingness of some or most persons who identify as LGBT to freely affirm themselves as such out of fear of public persecution, scrutiny or harassment.

In December 2018, billboards promoting tolerance towards same-sex couples, put up in various Bulgarian cities such as Varna and Burgas, were vandalised.

During the 2020–2021 Bulgarian protests, there was a rise in anti-LGBT rhetoric and discrimination, as right-wing and far-right groups and organizations attempted to put the topic of gender (through the anti-LGBT trope of gender ideology) at the forefront over the COVID-19 pandemic in Bulgaria and the protests themselves. Gender became a slur for non-binary people or any person perceived to be LGBT. Nonetheless, acceptance of LGBT people among the more educated, middle-class Bulgarians has increased due to advocacy from LGBT organizations, such as holding LGBT pride parades in Sofia and the first LGBT exhibition (the Balkan Pride) outside Sofia, as well as the recognition of a same-sex marriage between an Australian and French citizen in a Bulgarian court.

=== Pride parades ===
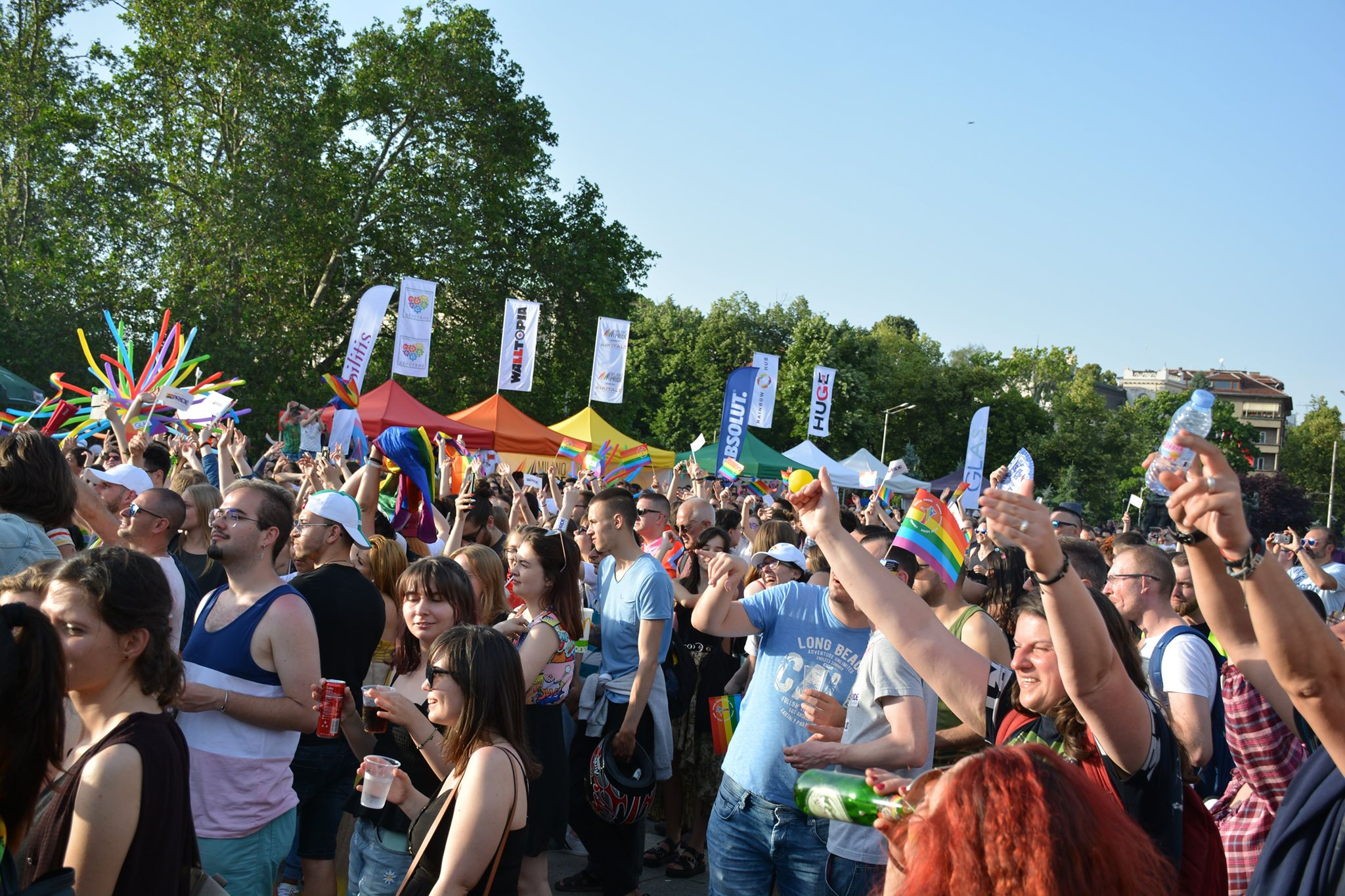
Sofia Pride in 2019

The only pride parade to take place so far in Bulgaria is Sofia Pride. The first parade took place in 2008 and drew about 150 participants, who were attacked with petrol bombs, rocks and glass bottles. More than 60 hooligans were arrested. The pride parades in the following years went on peacefully and started drawing more participants as well as the support of political parties, local businesses and embassies. In 2017, the parade was attended by more than 3,000 participants and was supported by 18 diplomatic missions. The pride week also included a film program and an art festival. In 2019, around 6,000 attendees marched in the gay pride parade. It was supported by 25 diplomats and representatives of international organizations and foundations.

The Bulgarian Orthodox Church strongly opposes freedom of assembly for LGBT people and any form of manifestation like pride parades, calling them a "sinful demonstration" and the "sin of sodomy". Before the 2012 Sofia Pride, a priest from Sliven said in a newspaper interview that "gays should be beaten with stones". National Resistance, a far-right group, has advocated using brooms and shovels to attack people at pride parades.

Parties such as the Bulgarian Socialist Party, the Greens, Bulgarian Left and DSB have supported the parade organizers' right to hold the pride parade. However, in 2014, only the Greens and Bulgarian Left sent statements of support to the parade. Georgi Kadiev, the former Bulgarian Socialist Party mayoral candidate for Sofia, participated in support of the pride parade in 2011. Some parties, such as the far-right nationalist Ataka party, strongly oppose the pride parades, protesting against them, as well as homosexuality more broadly.

=== LGBT rights organizations ===
There are several LGBT organizations in Bulgaria:

- Bilitis Resource Center (Bulgarian: Ресурсен център Билитис). Founded in 2004 by the activist Monika Pisankaneva, it protects the rights of lesbians, bisexual women and transgender people. Bilitis has projects around the country, including the Rainbow Hub in Sofia, coordinated by Gloriya Filipova.
- LGBT Deystvie (Bulgarian: ЛГБТ Действие). It was founded in 2010 and protects the rights of LGBT people in the country. It is based in Sofia.
- GLAS Foundation (Bulgarian: Фондация ГЛАС).
- Single Step Foundation (Bulgarian: Сингъл Степ). Founded in 2016, Single Step's mission is to help LGBTI youth, their families, friends and allies in Bulgaria in the process of recognizing, coming out and affirming their sexual orientation and gender identity. It launched the first licensed online support chat in the country in October 2017.
- LGBT Plovdiv (Bulgarian: ЛГБТ Пловдив). A small LGBT organization based in Plovdiv and the region.

=== Pazardzhik case ===
In November 2009, the District Council of Pazardzhik voted in favor of an amendment forbidding the "public demonstration of sexual or any other orientation." LGBTQ organizations attacked the decision of the council, arguing it was discriminatory. In October 2010, the district's Administrative Court struck down the resolution, citing procedural errors in its passing. The court's decision was affirmed on appeal by the Supreme Administrative Court in July 2011.

== Summary table ==
| Same-sex sexual activity legal | Yes (Since 1968) |
| Equal age of consent (16) | Yes (Since 2002) |
| Freedom of expression in schools | No (Since 2024) |
| Anti-discrimination laws in employment | Yes (Since 2004) |
| Anti-discrimination laws in the provision of goods and services | Yes (Since 2004) |
| Anti-discrimination laws in all other areas, including indirect discrimination and hate speech | Yes (Since 2004) |
| Anti-discrimination laws concerning gender identity | Yes (Since 2015) |
| Hate crime laws include sexual orientation | Yes (Since 2023) |
| Hate crime laws include gender identity | No |
| Same-sex marriage | No (Constitutional ban since 1991) |
| Recognition of same-sex couples | No |
| Adoption by single LGBT individuals | Yes |
| Stepchild adoption by same-sex couples | No |
| Joint adoption by same-sex couples | No |
| Lesbians, gays and bisexuals allowed to serve openly in the military | Yes (Since 2006) |
| Right to change legal gender | No (de facto since 2017, de jure since 2023) |
| Access to IVF for lesbian couples | No (Only for married couples and single women) |
| Automatic parenthood for both spouses after birth | No |
| Conversion therapy banned on minors | No |
| Commercial surrogacy for gay male couples | No (Banned regardless of sexual orientation) |
| MSMs allowed to donate blood | Yes |

== See also ==
- Human rights in Bulgaria
- LGBT rights in Europe
- LGBT rights in the European Union
