= Obesity in Malta =

Obesity in Malta is a contemporary health issue. This problem is connected to several other illnesses and economic costs for the government. The causes for Malta's obesity are various and one of the leading aspects is physical inactivity.

Malta's authorities declare that obesity is one of the major preventable causes of other illnesses and finally, leading to an earlier death. In 2014, with the publication of the Eurostat statistics, Malta's obesity problem caught the national, as well as international attention intensively. In the same year, Malta's Parliamentary Secretary for Health, Chris Fearne, announced that the government is committed to tackle the prevailing obesity problem in Malta.

Malta appears to be the most obese country within the European Union - according to Eurostat and the World Health Organization.

With 26% - meaning one out of four adults - being obese, Malta is far ahead on the obesity scale, comparable to other EU countries. For children, the situation is worse in Malta, as 40% of all children are obese there. The prevalence of obesity has increased from 23% in 2002 to 25% in 2015.

In general, Eurostat bases its obesity observation on a BMI calculation. In regard to this method, the definition of obesity is that a person needs to have a higher BMI of 30 in order to be categorized as obese.

Important findings of the Eurostat statistics included the systematic difference between men and women concerning the obesity level. The proportion of men being obese, with 28.1%, was much higher than that of women in Malta, with 23.9%. The age also plays an important role in Malta's obesity problem. Whereas only one young adult person out of 10 is considered to be obese in Malta (12%), one out of three older persons in Malta (33.6%) is categorized as obese.

Education plays a certain role in Malta's obesity problem. In almost every EU member state, the share of obesity decreases with education level. 30.3% of Malta's obese population come from a low education level, and only 15.8% of people with a high education level were being classified as obese.

== Effects ==
Obesity tends to lead to a number of non-communicable diseases and impacts individuals through a lower quality and length of life. The mental effects of obesity should not be ignored either: depression, discrimination and lower educational attainment are psychological aspects related to the physical negative consequences. Regarding the subsequent illnesses of obesity, the chances of being affected by diabetes type two, high blood pressure, heart diseases, a stroke, as well as some forms of cancer are way higher. Furthermore, there exists evidence that obesity and mortality risks are positively related. Malta, contradictory to this statement, has one of the highest life expectancies within Europe. Its life expectancy at birth was 81.9 years in 2015 and therefore above the EU average of 80.6 years. Nevertheless, cardiovascular diseases remain the leading cause in Malta for men and women. Additionally, death rates from ischaemic heart disease in Malta remain above the EU average, but have shown a relatively consistent downward trend. More than a quarter of all deaths from ischaemic heart disease were premature, occurring in people aged under 75.

=== Costs for the Government ===
But not only the health and quality of life of individuals is negatively influenced by obesity, but the costs associated with obesity are also weighing on the shoulders of several stakeholders, inter alia the government and the society at large. Based on the 2015 EHIS results, the cost of obesity in Malta has been estimated at 36.3 million euro. 23.8 million euros are thereby direct costs, divided into primary care, specialist care, hospital care, cost of allied healthcare professionals, pharmaceutical care, weight loss interventions and public interventions. The indirect costs, amounted to 12.5 million euro, consist of absenteeism, presenteeism, government subsidies, forgone earnings and forgone taxes. Different scholars point out a figure of 23.7 million euro for overweight and obesity in Malta, including herewith hospital costs and the cost of visits to general practitioners and specialists. Furthermore, the inability to stop the growing levels of obesity will probably result in a loss up to 90,000 hours of work for Malta due to the connected health complications. Besides, it is also estimated that, if the rising percentages of obesity will not be stopped, the costs of obesity will rise to 41.4 million euro which is equal to 110 euro per capita. In the long term, the figure could even rise to 46.5 million euros by 2050.

== Physical Inactivity ==
For decades, Malta has been sheltered from the influence of other cultures, but with its entry into the European Union and the growing globalization, Malta became easier to access. This aspect, in turn, led to more trade relations, enhancing its tourism and economic opportunities. Moreover, its culture and lifestyle were equally influenced. It is argued that it is exactly this change of Malta's traditional Mediterranean diet to a high-fat and high-sugar fast food nutrition which is favored by many Western European countries and the United States. When regarding the causes of obesity in general, the major reasons for weight gains include diminished physical activity, high-fat diets and inadequate adjustments of energy intakes. On the one hand, it is Malta's extremely westernized diet - which the Mediterranean genes cannot adopt to quickly. On the other hand, it is Malta's lack of physical activity, affecting its obesity rate.

Taking the aspect of physical activity more detailed into account, there can be different layers identified for impacting the physical activity of a country. There exist natural,- built,- and social environment factors, as well as individual determinants.

One factor influencing Malta's physical inactivity plays its built environment, meaning its urban design and its infrastructure. Infrastructure which is designed to encourage physical activity, such as the construction of bike lanes, diminishes obesity. Malta has the highest motorisation rate among any region from one of the Member States that joined the EU in 2004 or more recently. Following this argument, its motorisation rate consisted of 592 passenger cars per thousand inhabitants in 2012. There are usual smaller EU countries which are having the highest motorisation rates: Luxembourg makes the first place with 661 passenger cars per 1000 inhabitants, whereas Malta follows directly with 634 cars per 1000 inhabitants.

Next to the built environment, it is the social environment which influences the physical activity of a country. In this respect, the income factor is decisive. There exist a definite correlation between physical inactivity and a low level of income. With 11 billion euro, Malta has the lowest GDP ration as country in 2017, compared to the other EU countries. When looking at the GDP per inhabitant (in accordance with the Purchasing Power Standards), Malta belongs with 27,500 euro to the lowest quarter of the EU countries. Luxembourg, with 75,000, is the country with the highest GDP per inhabitant. Malta's comparably low income level explains partly its physical inactivity and its high obesity rate.

The individual determinant includes the education factor. It is a concern that people with a lower education status are more prone to be less physically active, since these groups have less leisure time or poorer access to recreation and sport facilities. With 18.6%, Malta has the highest percentage of all EU countries regarding early leavers from education (aged 18–24). Malta's low commitment to exercise is also based on its general low education level.

== Remedies ==
Especially since 2014, when the statistics about Malta being the most obese country, got published, Malta's government tries actively to tackle to obesity issue. Childhood obesity, in particular, is one of its major concerns: Kindergarten children learn how to prepare healthy foods and shops in schools are allowed to sell only products the Maltese authorities consider as healthy. In general, Malta's government launched several initiatives in order to reduce obesity. One of them is the 'Healthy Weight for Life strategy for 2012–2020, which aims to establish a society in which healthy lifestyles related to diet and physical activity become the norm and healthy choices are easy and accessible to all. Furthermore, Malta published the "Food and Nutrition Policy and Action Plan for Malta 2015-2020".

== See also ==
- Health in Malta
- Epidemiology of obesity
