= Monika Pisankaneva =

Bulgarian lecturer and LGBT activist

Monika Pisankaneva (Bulgarian: Моника Писанкънева, born 1968) is a Bulgarian lecturer and LGBT activist. She worked for the Bulgarian organization Gemini, an LTBT rights group, between 1998 and 2001. She founded the Bilitis Resource Center (Bulgarian: Ресурсен център Билитис), an organization which facilitates networking and outreach for women LGBT community members in Sofia in 2004, serving as its director until 2017. She was one of the first academics to publish about LGBT rights in Bulgaria. In addition to her activism, she works with national and international civil-service organizations overseeing various human rights projects.

== Early life and education ==
Monika Pisankaneva was born in Sofia, in the People's Republic of Bulgaria in 1968. After earning a degree in philosophy in 1992 from Sofia University, she went abroad to continue her education. She graduated in 1998 from the University of Amsterdam with a degree in European studies, with a focus on social science. In 2007, she earned a master's degree in philanthropy from the University of Bologna.

== Career ==
Pisankaneva returned to Bulgaria in 1998 and began working in an NGO which provided civil service programs. She has lectured on sexual identities at New Bulgarian University since 2000. In 1998, she began volunteering at the LGBT organization Gemini and worked with the group through 2001. In 2004, Pisankaneva founded the Bilitis Resource Center (Bulgarian: Ресурсен център Билитис) in Sofia and served as its director until 2017. The organization serves as a networking and outreach program for lesbian, transgender, and bisexual women. She began working on the Sofia Pride Organizing Committee in 2009. In 2019, she organized a panel discussion for the rights to free movement for same-sex families within the European Union with the Bulgarian candidate for the European Parliament, Toma Belev and Zaritsa Georgieva, a representative of the Green Movement. Belev signed a public promise to serve as an advocate for the LGBT community if he was elected.

Pisankaneva has served as a project manager at the national and international level for various service organizations operating in Sofia. She currently manages a research project, "Towards Inclusive of LGBTI Students and Staff School Policies", which evaluates and makes recommendations for improvement of security and inclusiveness of school policies with regard to LGBT staff and students. where she researches school policies in Sofia to analyze protection levels of LGBT students and staff. She also manages the Workshop for Civic Initiatives Foundation's philanthropic development program. In 2017, she was nominated for the Bulgarian Helsinki Committee's Human of the Year Award as the " longest-serving open LGBTI activist in Bulgaria". In 2018, the Bilitis Resource Center was a co-honoree of the Bulgarian Helsiniki Committee's Activist of the Year Award, with the organizations Deystvie (Bulgarian: Действие) and the GLAS Foundation for their joint venture to found the first LGBT community center in Bulgaria, the Rainbow Hub.

== Selected works ==
Pisankaneva began researching and publishing about Bulgaria's LGBT community in 2000 and was a pioneer in creating source materials about homosexuality in the country. She has published various works, including articles for international journals and encyclopedias. Among them are:

- Писанкънева, Моника (1999). "Толерантността като маргинализация: образи на хомосексуалността в българските масмедии" [Tolerance as Marginalization: Images of Homosexuality in the Bulgarian Mass Media]. Други публикации (in Bulgarian) (1). Sofia, Bulgaria: Soros Center for the Arts.
- Pisankaneva, Monika (2002). "Reflections on Butch-Femme and the Emerging Lesbian Community in Bulgaria". Journal of Lesbian Studies. 6 (2). Philadelphia, Pennsylvania: Taylor & Francis: 135–144. doi:10.1300/J155v06n02_17. ISSN 1089-4160. OCLC 714128548. PMID 24807668. S2CID 207254399.
- Pisankaneva, Monika (2003). The Forbidden Fruit: Sexuality in Communist Bulgaria. Socialism and Sexuality: Past and Present of Radical Sexual Politics 3–4 October 2003 in Amsterdam. Amsterdam, Netherlands: University of Amsterdam. OCLC 1055414149.
- Писанкънева, Моника (2015). Училища за всички: положението на лесбийки, гей, бисексуални, трансджендър и интерсекс ученици и учители в българските училища [Schools for All: The Situation of Lesbians, Gays, Bisexuals, Transgender and Intersex Students and Teachers in Bulgarian Schools] (in Bulgarian). Sofia: Билитис. ISBN 978-954-91940-3-6. English version
- Писанкънева, Моника (2017). Семействата на дъгата в България : доклад от качествено изследване на фондация 'Ресурсен център Билитис' [The Families of the Rainbow in Bulgaria: A Report From a Qualitative Study of the Bilitis Resource Center Foundation] (in Bulgarian). Sofia: Билитис. ISBN 978-954-91940-4-3.
