= Health in Malta =

Health in Malta has seen improvements in recent years, with one of the highest life expectancies in Europe. Malta has a good overall quality of health and has seen rapid growth and improvement in key health indicators. Malta has seen significant development in the practice of mental health which has been supported by new infrastructure and increased government health spending. The introduction of health-focused government initiatives, particularly around nutrition, alcohol, smoking, and health will likely contribute to the further improvement of overall health nationwide.

However, there is also a persistence of negative health trends within the Maltese islands. The Maltese diet has shifted away from the traditional Mediterranean diet to include a higher intake of fats and sugars. This is attributed to factors such as increased access to processed foods and the diversification of food preparation methods. Alcohol consumption and smoking prevalence remain average for the region however the occurrence of teenage alcohol use disorder and passive smoking in children is an area of health concern. As well as this, an abnormally high instance of childhood and adult obesity poses a large issue for the Maltese health system. These risk factors within the population have resulted in a large occurrence of Ischaemic Heart Disease, the highest occurrence rate of the disease in the European Union.

== Health Indicators ==
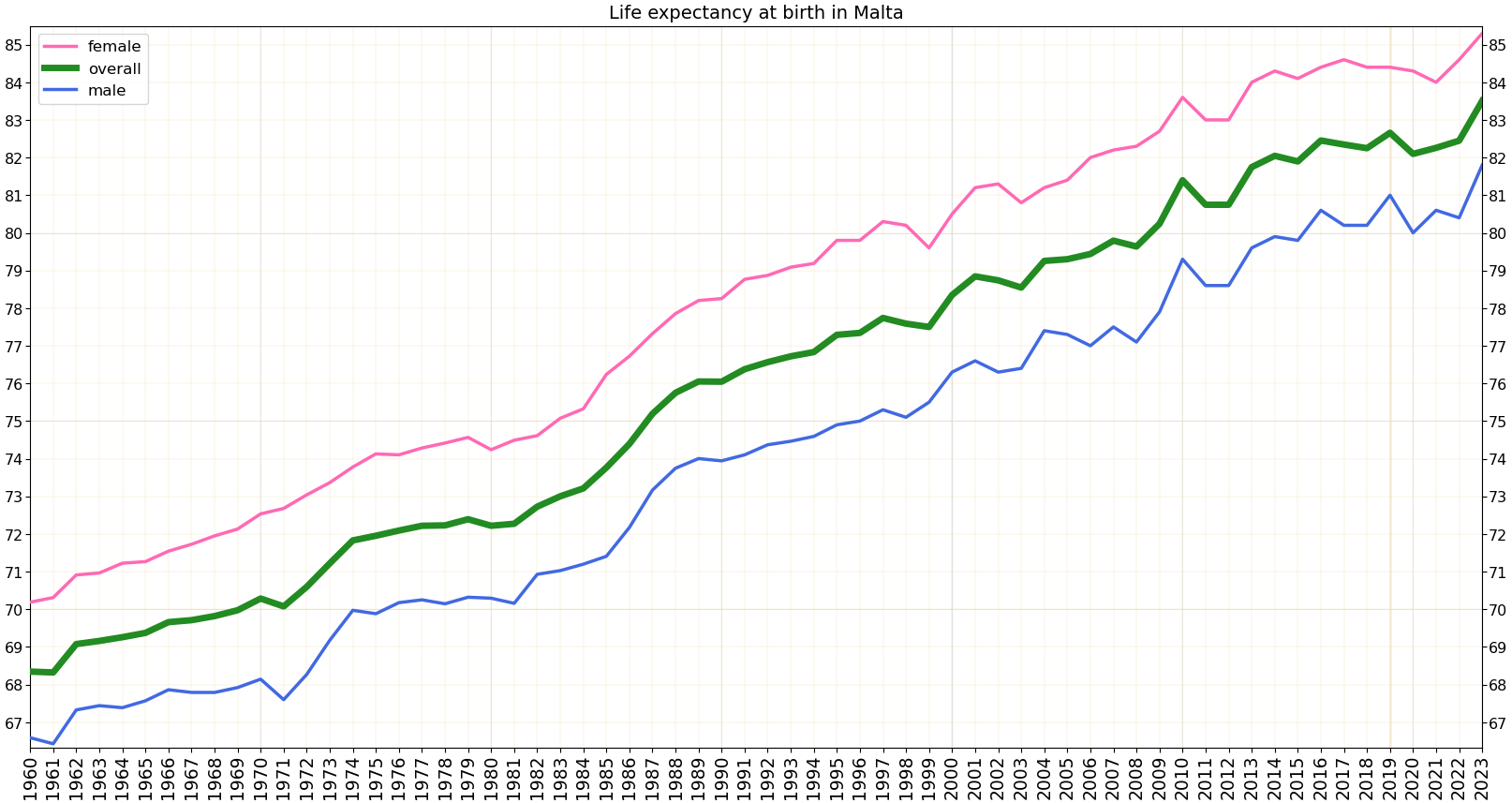
Life expectancy in Malta

The life expectancy at birth in Malta is 82.4 years which is 1.5 years higher than the average life expectancy of 80.9 across the European Union. The life expectancy in Malta has also increased by more than 4 years since 2000, indicating improvements in health in Malta overall. Life expectancy at birth varies between males and females with a life expectancy of 84.1 for females and Malta and 80.5 for males in Malta. 23.5% of the population was over 60 years old in 2013.

Infant health in Malta also indicates sound overall health with high infant immunisation rates, with only 1% of one-year-old children lacking immunisations. Malta has a low infant mortality rate, with 5.6 deaths per 1000 live births.

Environmental contribution to health in Malta is also minimal. The mortality rate attributable to ambient air pollution is 20 per 100,000, placing Malta in the ‘Very High Human Development’ category as defined by the WHO. The mortality rate as a result of unsafe water and sanitation services is 0.1 per 100,000, again placing Malta in WHO's ‘Very High Human Development’ category concerning environmental demographics.

== Diet and Nutrition ==
The traditional Mediterranean diet which had been consumed in Malta before the mid to late 20th century was rich in fruits, vegetables, olive oil and fish. The Maltese diet now includes a larger amount of sugar, fats and meat products. Cheeses and desserts were two categories in which an increase in consumption has been seen. There is also a large number of traditional Maltese desserts which are consumed widely across Malta. Malta has also seen an increase in the consumption of processed foods, particularly within younger demographics. This increase in the consumption of fats, sugars and processed foods in Malta is aligned with global shifts in food consumption in recent history.

The movement away from a traditional Mediterranean diet is a result of multiple factors. These include increased disposable income within the population and improved living conditions overall, as well as the development of commercial trade with other nations and increased diversity in foods and food preparation methods available.

Although a Mediterranean diet is considered healthy, reducing the chances of suffering a heart attack or stroke by a third the Maltese diet, said to be influenced by the 200-year British rule and the proximity to Italy does not have the same beneficial effects. Biscuits, chocolates, and sweets are more popular than nuts and fruit and in general, the population follows a more Westernised diet than geography might indicate.

== Health Issues ==
=== Obesity ===
Over the past decade, incidences of both childhood and adult obesity have risen in Malta, and are now the highest in the European Union. These unusually high obesity rates have been attributed to a sedentary lifestyle, with greatly below-average levels of physical activity in both children and adults, as well as the movement away from a traditional Mediterranean diet towards manufactured and packaged foods.

In 2015 the World Health Organization reported that Malta had the highest overweight and obesity rates in the European Union, and third in the whole of Europe, after Andorra and Turkey. In 2011 it was reported that 21.1% of women and 24.7% of men were obese and 29.5% of Maltese children aged 11–15 were either overweight or obese. It was suggested that this was a result of increased trade and urbanisation, and an associated decrease in physical activity and an increase in consumption of oil and sugar-based foods.

Education Minister Evarist Bartolo established a programme of screening and testing school children to establish their body mass index in June 2015. School tuck shops will not sell soft drinks, but only water.

=== Ischaemic Heart Disease ===
Cardiovascular diseases are the leading cause of death in Malta for both males and females. Ischaemic Heart Disease is the most prevalent cardiovascular disease in Malta and was responsible for one in every five deaths in Malta in 2016. Diabetes is a significant risk factor in the development of Ischaemic Heart Disease. Malta's high incidence of obesity and diabetes, the third-highest in the European Union, are both risk factors for Ischaemic heart disease and are thought to be a contributing factor to the prevalence of Ischaemic Heart Disease.

=== Transmissible Diseases ===
Despite good overall health, incidences of infectious diseases such as HIV and Tuberculosis have risen in Malta. The majority of HIV and Tuberculosis cases in Malta are foreign-born. Screening undertaken on undocumented immigrants upon entry into Malta showed that Tuberculosis prevalence was 390 per 100,000 people. In comparison, the incidence of Tuberculosis in the Maltese born population is 2.1 per 100, 000 people. In 2016 Malta recorded the third highest number of new HIV cases in the European Union. A similar upward trend has been seen in Tuberculosis cases however this growth has stabilised.

Throughout Malta's history it has been affected by large global outbreaks of transmissible disease, such as the Cholera outbreak of 1837 and the Spanish Flu epidemic which was present in Malta from 1918 to 1919. The first confirmed case of COVID-19 in Malta was on March 7, 2020.

=== Smoking and Alcohol Consumption ===
20.1% of the Maltese population aged 15 years and over are categorised as daily smokers. When divided by gender, 23.3% of males aged over 15 are considered daily smokers while 17% of females over the age of 18 are considered daily smokers. However, whilst the number of male daily smokers is decreasing, the number of female daily smokers is increasing. Europe has the highest proportion of smokers when compared to other regions globally with 28% of European adults considered smokers.

Passive smoking in children is also an issue of prevalence in Malta with 31% of 5-8-year-old children considered passive smokers. This high rate of passive smoking as well as smoking uptake in young teens has increased in the rates of asthma diagnosis in children in Malta.

A ban on smoking in all enclosed public places came into force in January 2013. An earlier law of 2004, the second in Europe, had restricted smoking to designated areas, ventilated and cut off from the rest of the establishment. The EU anti-smoking campaign HELP: A Life Without Tobacco found the earlier ban had beneficial effects. The government offers Tobacco Dependence Support Classes at clinics around the island and a Quit Line and Free phone service for those who want to stop smoking.

On average, an adult in Malta consumes eight litres of pure alcohol annually. This is below the European average of eleven litres per year. However, a 2019 WHO report indicated that Malta's growth in alcohol consumption is one of the largest in the European Union. Whilst current levels of consumption for adults remains within the average range, the consumption of alcohol in Malta has been linked as a contributing factor to the high occurrence of ischaemic heart disease. Whilst alcohol consumption quantities in adults are not considered high, there is a high incidence of alcohol use disorder and binge drinking among teens. The legal age to drink and purchase alcohol in Malta is 17, raised from 16 in 2009. However, enforcement of this drinking age is extremely lax, especially in areas such as nightlife areas like Paceville or Valletta.

=== Diabetes mellitus ===
Diabetes mellitus is a significant health issue within Malta. Estimates show that 10% of the adult population in Malta (those aged above 18) currently have the condition, with a large number of these cases likely undiagnosed. It is predicted that cases of diabetes in Malta are likely to rise. Many of the risk factors associated with the development of Type 2 diabetes are prevalent in Malta, including obesity, low levels of physical activity, unhealthy eating habits and smoking. Specialist diabetes services and care are provided at Mater Dei Hospital in Msida. In 2015 it was estimated that $2113 was spent by the Maltese government on each person suffering from diabetes.

== Exercise and Physical Activity ==
In Malta, only 39% of young males and 10% of young females are meeting the recommended one hour of moderate to vigorous physical activity per day. A quarter of young males and females also exceeded the recommended screen time on weekends and weekdays. In the adult population, 72% of people are classed as physically inactive.

One reason for the lower than recommended levels of physical activity, especially in children, is the high population density and division of land use within Malta. 29.7% of land area in the Maltese islands is urban or industrial with a further 51% dedicated to agricultural use. This has left little area for the development of outdoor spaces devoted to physical activity, especially in urban residential areas.

== Mental Health ==
Whilst there has been minimal reporting on the state of mental health in Malta, statistics indicate that in 2014, 4.3% of deaths were the result of mental health and behavioural disorders. Outpatient and inpatient mental health services are available through both public and private health providers and community based mental health clinics have been growing. Malta also has a very high ratio of psychiatric beds per 100,000 people in the population. Malta has previously had only a small number of mental health professionals as a result of a lack of academic capability within the country. Malta is continuing to undergo development in the area of mental health. The Mental Health Act was introduced in 2014 and outlined plans to fortify existing facilities and services as well as to drive the growth of community centred outpatient clinics.

== Health Infrastructure ==
=== Hospitals and Public Health Facilities ===
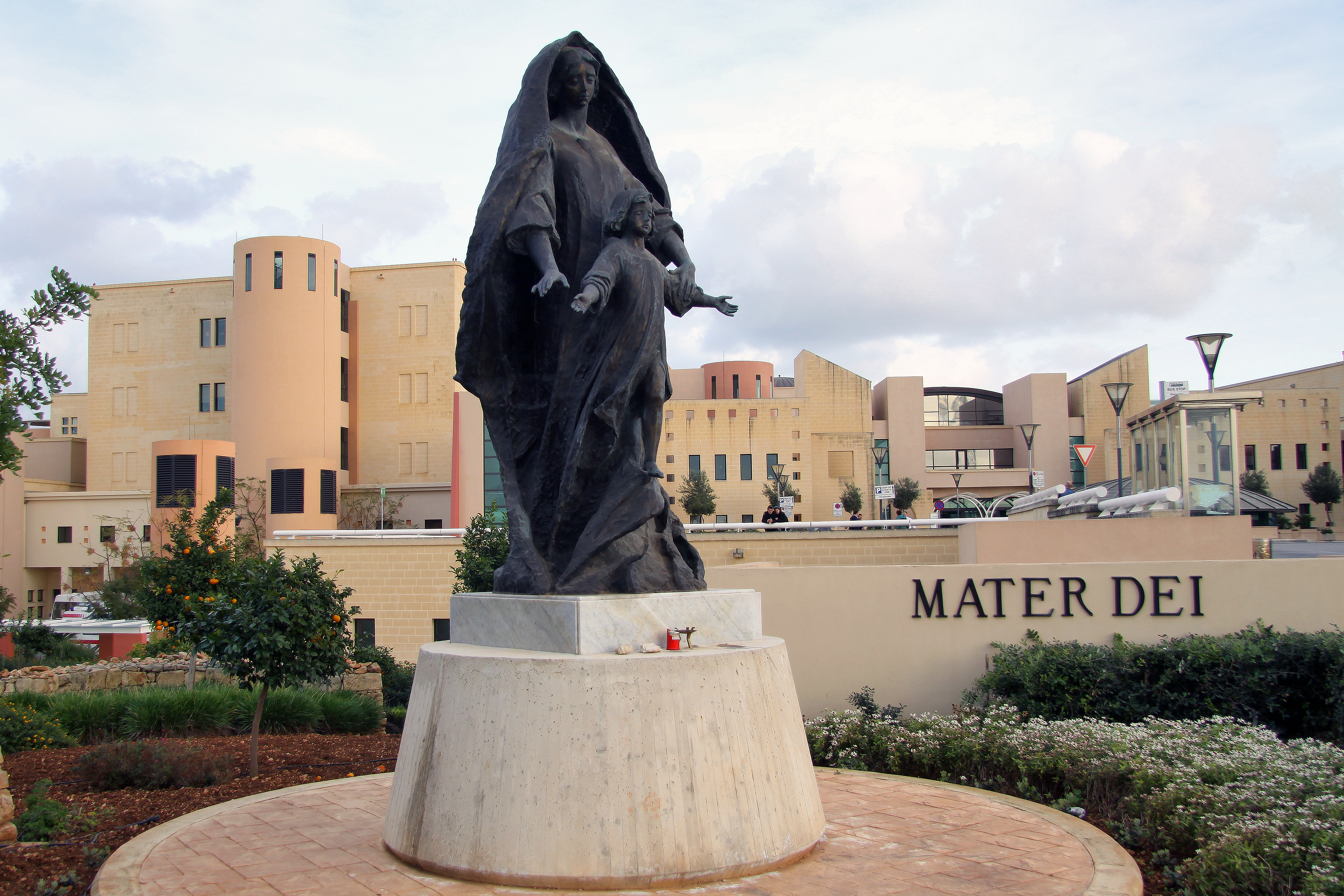
Mater Dei Hospital in Msida

The Maltese healthcare system consists of both public and private streams of health service facilities. The public, tax-funded channel of healthcare is free for Maltese residents at the point of service and provides a large scope of high quality facilities. The Mater Dei Hospital located in Msida is the primary hospital nationally and also functions as a training hospital. It was established in 2007, up until which St Luke's in Pieta was the nation's primary public hospital. Both hospitals provide a full range of services and serve a large proportion of the nation's population.

There has been recent growth in Malta's private healthcare system with an increased number of individuals residing in Malta purchasing insurance through private providers. Private hospitals provide treatment using advanced technologies with some smaller private hospitals providing specialised care for a broad range of health conditions.

=== Government Initiatives ===
Government health expenditure per capita in Malta has increased steadily in the past decade with per person spending increasing by 60% to EUR 2732 per person. The European Structural Investment Fund has allocated an additional EUR 19, 000, 000 in its 2014-2020 program to assist in the development and upskilling of health workers as well as to contribute to the establishment of eHealth programs in Malta. Public health policies and initiatives in Malta have had a focus on reducing tobacco and alcohol consumption and have been successful with Malta recording the third lowest rate of death from preventable disease in the European Union.

The Maltese Government, specifically the Parliamentary Secretariat for Health, has also released recommended dietary guidelines in order to promote healthier eating. These were published in 2016 and are aligned with the 2015-2020 Food and Nutrition Action Plan for Malta. The guidelines encourage the consumption of foods from all six food groups, and recommend minimising the consumption of saturated and trans fat, salt and sugar.

== See also ==
Healthcare in Malta
