= Ivaylo Penchev =

Bulgarian climbing wall manufacturer

- Born: Ivaylo Penkov Penchev; 10 March 1970 (age 56); Veliko Tarnovo, Bulgaria
- Education: Sofia University theoretical physics
- Occupations: Entrepreneur; Businessman
- Years active: 1992–present

Ivaylo Penchev is the co- founder and CEO of Walltopia, the largest climbing wall manufacturer in the world. He, along with Metin Musov, founded the company in 1996 in Sofia, Bulgaria.

== Early life ==
Penchev was born in Veliko Tarnovo on 10 March 1970 to Penko Penchev (born 1946) and Radka Pencheva. Growing up he became interested in physics and enrolled in Sofia University, studying theoretical physics. However, he dropped out in 1994 as he got involved in trade and, ultimately, the development of Walltopia.

== Career ==
Penchev is the founder of other companies, such as HRT climbing holds, which is the largest producer of polyester resin climbing holds.

== Social positions ==
Penchev and his company are staunch supporters of LGBT rights and adoption rights for gay couples in Bulgaria. He praised the efforts of Sofia Pride 2018, stating, "I realized that they felt unaccepted and because of their difficult situation they are trying to find their own happiness. That’s why we decided to support Sofia Pride – people should not be afraid to be themselves no matter what".

In March 2020, the University Alexandrovska Hospital rejected a conditional donation offer by Penchev to purchase respiratory equipment as Penchev had tried to require that the employees of his company Walltopia have priority for use of the devices, including for those already in use by other patients. The hospital responded that only doctors decide who use medical devices.

== See also ==
- List of Bulgarians
- List of outdoor industry parent companies
