= Amager Bakke =

Combined heat and power waste-to-energy plant and recreational facility in Copenhagen

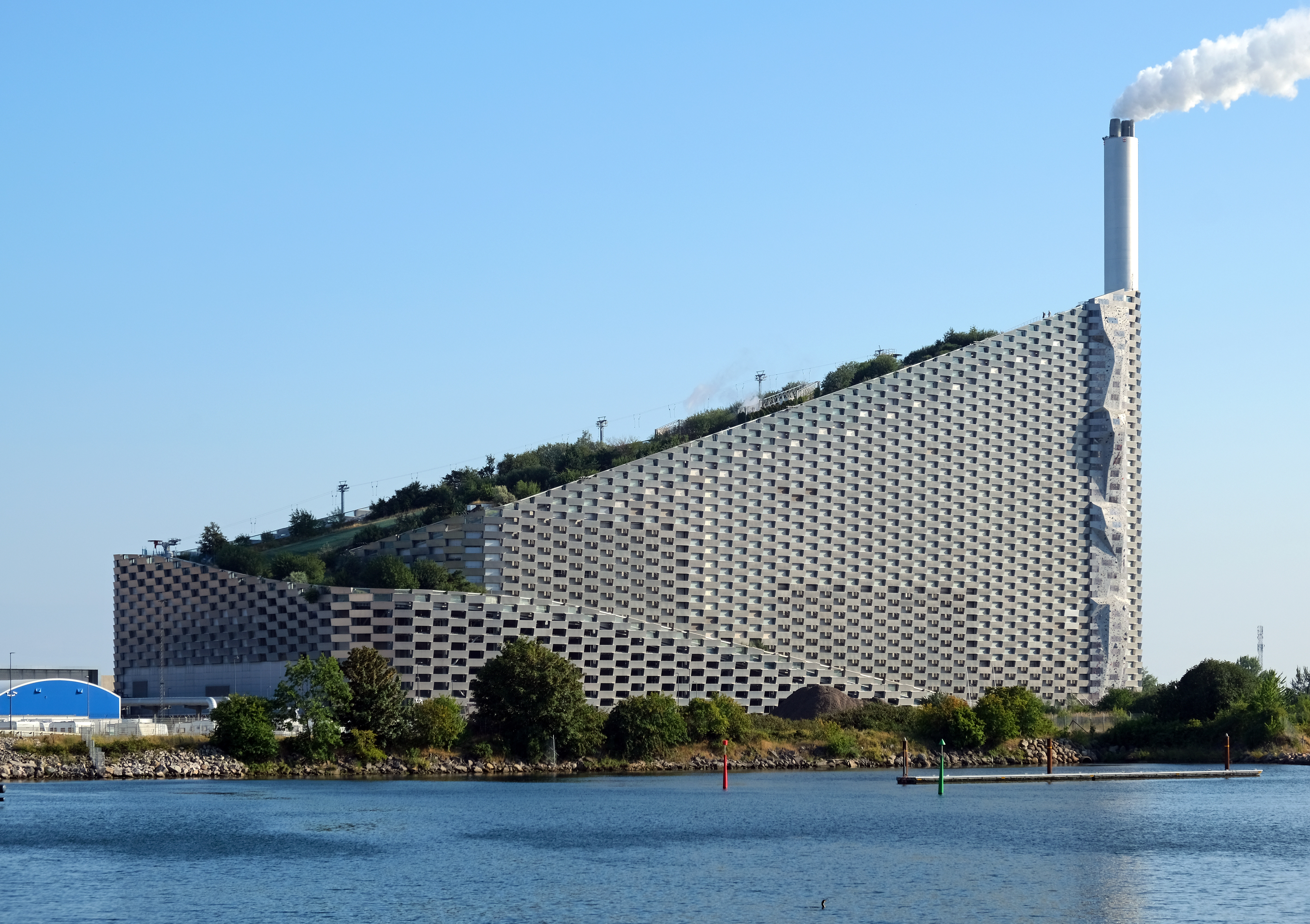
- Country: Denmark
- Location: Amager, in Copenhagen
- Coordinates: 55°41′4″N 12°37′12″E
- Status: Operational
- Construction began: 2013
- Commission date: 30 March 2017
- Construction cost: $670 million
- Owner: Amager Resource Center

Thermal power station
- Primary fuel: Municipal solid waste
- Cogeneration?: 190 MW

Power generation
- Nameplate capacity: 57 MW

External links
- Website: www.a-r-c.dk/amager-bakke
- Commons: Related media on Commons

Amager Bakke (lit. 'Amager Hill'), also known as Amager Slope or Copenhill, is a combined heat and power waste-to-energy plant (new resource handling centre) and a 85 m (279 ft) tall recreational facility in Amager, Copenhagen, Denmark, located prominently within view of the city's downtown.

The facility opened in 2017, and partially replaced the nearby old incineration plant in Amager, which was in the process of being converted from coal to biomass (completed in 2020). The two plants played a major role in Copenhagen's ambitions of meeting zero carbon requirements by 2025, but the operator Amager Resource Center was found ineligible for national CCS funding in 2022.

The recreational components of the facility (the dry ski run, hiking trail and climbing wall) opened in December 2018, with an attendance estimated at 42-57 thousand visitors annually.

Copenhill was named the World Building of the Year 2021 at the fourteenth annual World Architecture Festival.

== Construction and technicalities ==
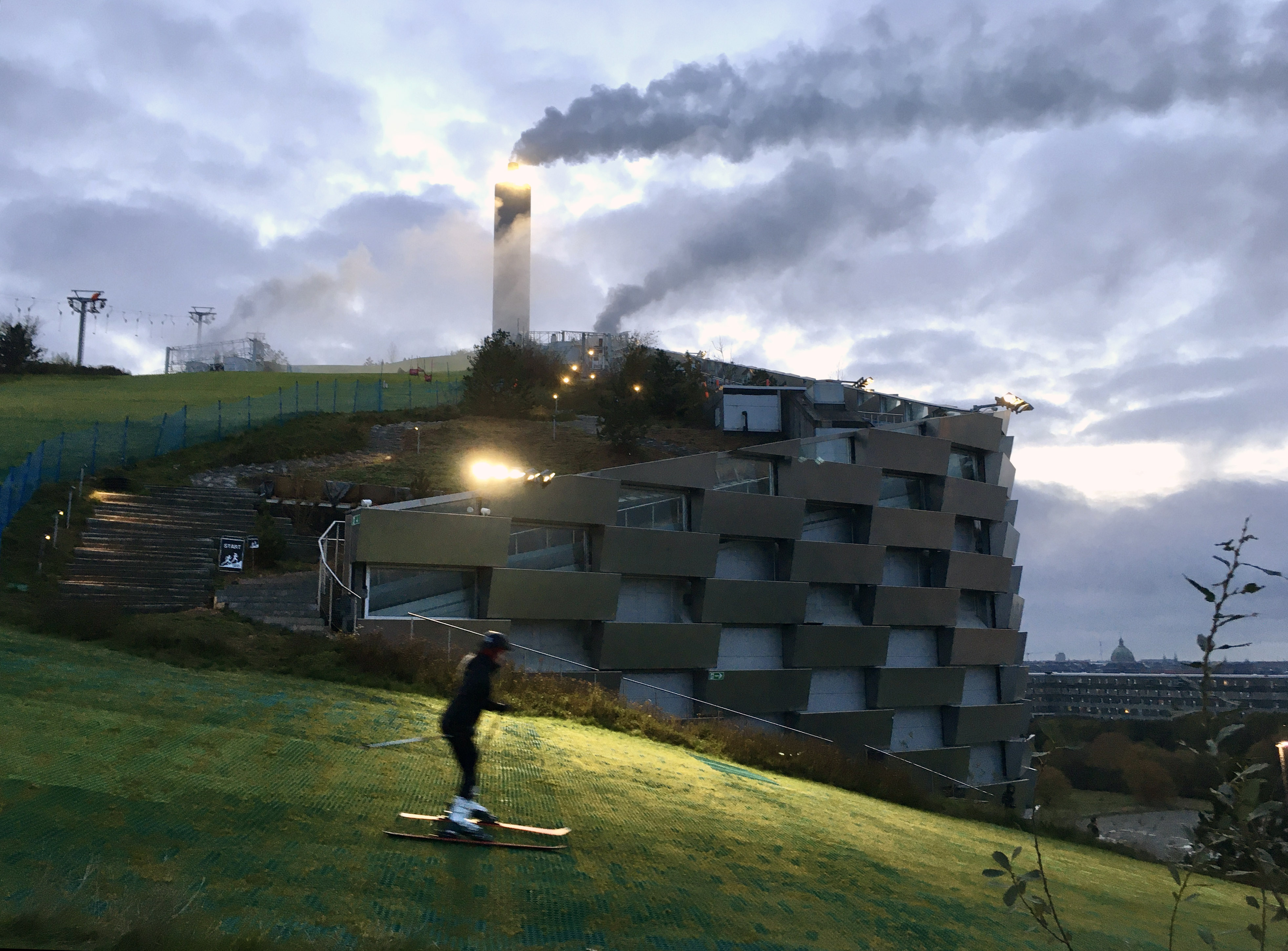
Skiing in Amager Bakke

The plant opened on 30 March 2017. It is estimated to cost $670 million, and is expected to burn 400,000 tons of municipal solid waste annually. It also houses a sports facility designed by Bjarke Ingels Group with an 85 meters tall sloped roof that doubles as year-round artificial ski slope, hiking slope and climbing wall, which opened to the public 4–6 October 2019. The climbing wall, manufactured by Walltopia, is the world's tallest permanent climbing wall at 80 meters.

Technically, the plant is designed to change between operating modes, producing 0-63 MW electricity and 157-247 MW district heating, depending on the local heat demand and power price. It produces more clean water than it uses. Because of filtration and other technologies, sulphur emission is expected to be reduced by 99.5% and NO_{x} by about 95% as well as dioxins and HCl and it claims to be the cleanest incineration plant in the world.

The chimney was originally designed to not emit its exhaust continuously, but instead in the form of "smoke" rings (consisting of water vapor rather than actual smoke). Due to technical difficulties, this idea was later abandoned.
