= Gloriya Filipova =

Bulgarian LGBTQ activist (born 1993)

Gloriya Filipova (Bulgarian: Глория Филипова; born c. 1993) is a Bulgarian human rights activist, known for her campaigning in support of LGBTQ women in Bulgaria. In 2021, Filipova was assaulted by Boyan Rasate, the leader of the Bulgarian National Union – New Democracy; Rasate was subsequently acquitted, found guilty, and reacquitted of grievous bodily harm against her.

== Biography ==
Filipova studied philosophy at university before she began joined the Bilitis Foundation in 2015. Bilitis, the first LGBTQ organisation in Bulgaria to be led by and focus on the rights of women, had been one of the key organisers of Sofia Pride since 2009. Filipova focused on researching homophobic and transphobic hate crimes, and trained as a restorative justice practitioner to reconcile perpetrators and victims, in addition to supporting with the organisation of Sofia Pride and running evens at the Rainbow Hub, the only LGBTQ community centre in Bulgaria, located in Sofia.

In November 2021, Filipova, alongside Kalina Zafirova, organised a protest under the slogan "not one more" (Bulgarian: Нито една повече, romanized: Nito edna poveche) to mark International Day for the Elimination of Violence Against Women. Filipova has said that many people in Bulgaria consider violence in their relationships to be "normal", and the personal nature of abuse within marriages or relationships can make victims feel "embarrassed" to report it to the authorities. Filipova has called on the Bulgarian government to amend domestic abuse legislation to include economic and psychological abuse.

In May 2022, Filipova spoke at the European Parliament at a "Feminism: an antidote to the far-right", a conference organised by the Left, where she spoke at a panel on anti-feminist and anti-gender attacks on LGBTQ equality alongside Justyna Wydrzyńska, Ebba Elena Karlström, Marina Echebarría Sáenz, and Malin Björk.

=== 2021 attack on the Rainbow Hub ===
On 30 October 2021, as Filipova hosted a transgender support group at the Rainbow Hub, the centre was attacked by a mob of ten men led by Boyan Rasate, the leader of the ultranationalist Bulgarian National Union party, and its candidate in the November 2021 presidential election. Filipova, who attempted to prevent the men from entering the building, was punched in the face by Rasate; the mob caused damage to furniture and equipment, and accused those present of "corrupting children". Rasate was reportedly armed with a knife during the attack. The attack against Filipova was condemned by numerous politicians, including Radan Kanev, a Member of the European Parliament for Bulgaria; Helena Dalli, the European Commissioner for Democracy, Justice, the Rule of Law and Consumer Protection; and the European Parliament's LGBTIQ+ Intergroup.

Rasate had his political immunity revoked, and was subsequently arrested and charged with hooliganism and grievous bodily harm. In June 2022, Rasate was fined 3000 BGN by the Sofia City Court, though he was acquitted of causing grievous bodily harm against Filipova and was not held criminally liable for the attack on the Rainbow Hub. A protest against the perceived lightness of the verdict was held by LGBTQ activists outside the Ministry of Justice on 27 June, demanding justice for Filipova.

Filipova appealed the verdict, and Rasate was subsequently found guilty of assault, with the appellate court ordering him to pay compensation to Filipova and serve six months of probation. A further appeal, this time by Rasate, led to him being acquitted of the assault against Filipova for a second time in 2026, with the presiding judge stating that "conflicting" witness accounts made the assault difficult to prove.

== Recognition ==
In 2021, Filipova was nominated for the Bulgarian Helsinki Committee's Person of the Year award by Siana Stefanova, Ivelina Panicharova, Paul Naydenov, and Diana Dimova, for her bravery during and following the Rainbow Hub attack, including using the media to highlight the issue of anti-LGBTQ hate crimes and the need to pass hate crime legislation in Bulgaria.
