= Bulgarian National Union – New Democracy =

Bulgarian National Union - ND Български национален съюз - Нова демокрация
- Leader: Boyan Rasate
- Founded: 19 April 1990
- Headquarters: Sofia
- Ideology: Ultranationalism; Bulgarian irredentism Neo-Nazism; Anti-communism; Anti-globalism; Anti-immigration; Hard Euroscepticism
- Political position: Far-right
- Colours: White, green, red, and black
- National Assembly: 0 / 240
- European Parliament: 0 / 17

Party flag
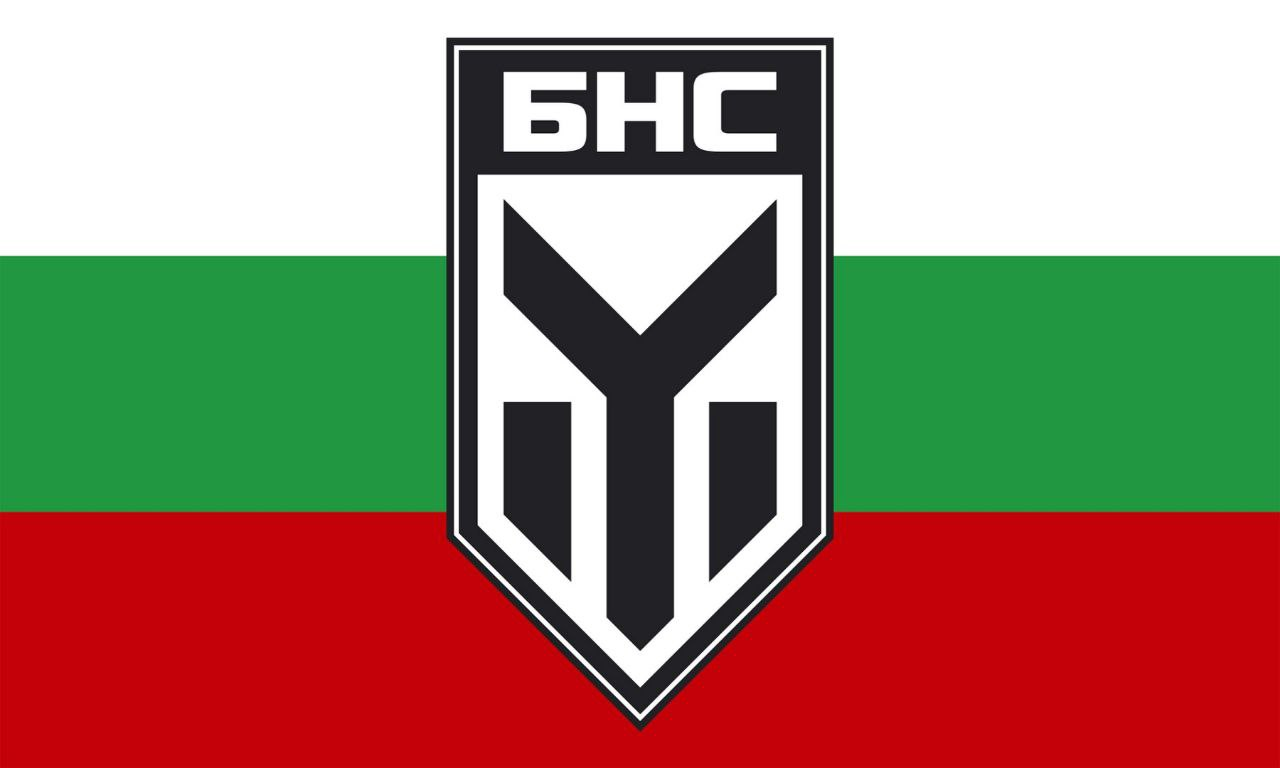

Website
- bns-rassate.bg

Bulgarian National Union – New Democracy (BNU-ND) (Bulgarian: Български национален съюз - Нова демокрация (БНС-НД)) is an ultranationalist political party based in Sofia, Bulgaria. The party claims to be patriotic and purports to protect Bulgarian values, but shows sympathies for Nazism. It can also be defined as anti-communist, because of the negative attitude towards certain communists in history. Its leader has been Boyan Rasate since 2014.

The party opposes the celebration of what it considers non-Bulgarian holidays in the country, including 9 May, "Victory Day". It draws attention by stating protests and by practicing civil disobedience. The Sofia Globe considers it a right-wing, nationalist fringe party, and commented that it has an "unblemished record of never winning any seats in elections".

== History ==
On April 19, 1990, the Sofia City Court House registered the political party "Bulgarian National Union 'New Democracy'" based on Article 9 of the Political Parties Act. Its statute was adopted on March 3, 1990, and Ivan Ivanov was elected as chairman. Kiril Ganev became his deputy, and Dimitar Penchev became the party's secretary. The organization's main goal was "the revival of Bulgaria - economically and spiritually".

Since 2003, the party hosts an annual 'Lukov March' to commemorate “fallen heroes of Bulgaria” with a torch march, taking place in February in Sofia.

On April 30, 2004, changes were made to the party's central leadership. Bogdan Yotsov became the chairman, and Boris Ivanov became the responsible secretary.

On June 6, 2009, Bogdan Yotsov and Boris Ivanov, representing the Bulgarian National Union 'New Democracy', filed an application for registration to participate in the elections for National Assembly deputies on July 5, 2009. A list containing the signatures of 23,374 voters supporting the party was presented. On June 10, the Central Election Commission registered the Bulgarian National Union 'New Democracy' in the register of parties and coalitions for participation in the elections.

Later, the party was led by Boyan Rasate, the former chairman of the Bulgarian National Union organization, and participated for the first time under his leadership in the parliamentary elections in 2014. In 2021, Rasate was accused of assaulting Gloriya Filipova, an LGBTQ activist; he was acquitted, found guilty, and reacquitted of the crime between 2022 and 2026.

In 2020, the Supreme Administrative Court upheld a ban by the Sofia municipality to ban 'Lukov March'.

The party condemns the Russian attack on Ukraine, which began on February 24, 2022, and on February 26, its members attended a protest against Vladimir Putin's aggression. At the protest, the leader of the Bulgarian National Union 'New Democracy', Boyan Rasate, demonstrated his support for the Ukrainian nationalists from the Azov Brigade by waving their flag.

== Objectives of the party ==
The party wants a strong centralized state power and rejects the current multi-party parliamentary democracy, calling it "compromised". It wants to dissolve all political parties and all organizations that it claims undermine the foundations of the Bulgarian state and society. The National Assembly should be composed of professionals, elected on a regional basis and competent in their field representatives of different backgrounds and professions. The means of production and the national economy can be both private and public, but the strategic sectors of the economy and public life are to be owned by Bulgarian state.

It favors a conscript army for men and women, and considers the Bulgarian "homeland" to be larger than its current borders. Bulgarian minorities outside of the Republic of Bulgaria are an integral part of the Bulgarian nation and state should protect their interests by any means – such regions include Thrace, Macedonia and Dobruja.

== Election results ==
=== National Assembly ===
Election	Leader	Votes	%	Seats	Government
2014	Boyan Rasate	5,559	0.17 (#21)	0 / 240	Extra-parliamentary
Apr 2021	Boyan Rasate	2,936	0.09 (#26)	0 / 240	Extra-parliamentary
Jul 2021	Boyan Rasate	4,690	0.17 (#15)	0 / 240	Extra-parliamentary
Nov 2021	Boyan Rasate	1,099	0.04 (#27)	0 / 240	Extra-parliamentary
2022	Boyan Rasate	1,849	0.07 (#26)	0 / 240	Extra-parliamentary
2023	Boyan Rasate	1,753	0.07 (#20)	0 / 240	Extra-parliamentary
Jun 2024	Boyan Rasate	2,163	0.10 (#28)	0 / 240	Extra-parliamentary
Oct 2024	Boyan Rasate	2,230	0.09 (#22)	0 / 240	Extra-parliamentary

=== European Parliament ===
Election	List leader	Votes	%	Seats	+/–	EP Group
2024	Boyan Rasate	1,956	0.10 (#27)	0 / 17	New	–

=== President ===
Election	Candidate	First round			Second round		
Election	Candidate	Votes	%	Rank	Votes	%	Result
2026	Boyan Rasate	2,321	0.15	20th	—N/a		Lost

== Controversies ==
In 2015, the government of Russia announced against the holding of the 'Lukov March' and accused the organizations supporting it of Neo-Nazism.

== Symbols ==
On their website, the BNU states that "The new shield of the BNU (Bulgarian National Union) was created in harmony with contemporary heraldic trends and clearly distinguishes the Bulgarian National Union from all Russophile parties and organizations that present themselves as Bulgarian and patriotic. Thus, the new emblem preserves one of the most ancient Bulgarian symbols while simultaneously giving it a new, aggressive vision."
