= BGO Gemini =

- President: Desislava Petrova
- Founded: 1992
- Dissolved: 2009
- Headquarters: Sofia Bulgaria
- Ideology: LGBT rights Pro-Europeanism; Anti-fascism

The Bulgarian Gay Organization "Gemini" was the primary organization in the LGBT rights movement in Bulgaria, based in Sofia.

It was legally registered in 1992 by an HIV-positive gay couple and since then has grown to become the main LGBT organization in the country. In 2006, it co-hosted the 10th annual ILGA-Europe (International Lesbian and Gay Association) Conference in Sofia. The theme was "We Are Family – Our Families in Europe and the European Family".

The organisation ceased operations in 2009.

== History ==
BGO Gemini was established as an NGO in the Sofia District Court on September 9, 1992. It first launched a hotline, run by volunteers who gave advice to all who called with questions about HIV/AIDS and LGBT issues. From 1997 on, with the support of UNAIDS, Gemini provided social support and informational materials about HIV/AIDS.

In 2001, Gemini was jumpstarted and expanded its focus to more general LGBT issues. In that year it held the first legislative workshop in Bulgaria to discuss the situation of LGBT people in the country. The meeting, supported by the Open Society Institute, was attended by judges, politicians, journalists, policemen, and leaders of NGOs. It helped to establish ties that would lead to a grassroots movement for the decriminalization of homosexuality and other advances in LGBT rights.

The next important step Gemini took was participating in the Balkan Triangle Project, which lasted from 2001 to 2004. Collaborating with COC Nederland and Accept Romania, Gemini aimed to establish itself as the national advocacy organization for the rights of LGBT Bulgarians, and did so successfully.

In 2002, it organized its first large-scale advocacy campaign: to decriminalize homosexuality under the Bulgarian Penal Code. In September of that year, Article 157 of the Code was modified so that gays and lesbians could live their lives openly.

In 2003, the then Chief Secretary of the Bulgarian Ministry of Internal Affairs, Boyko Borisov, made remarks equating homosexual people to pedophiles. However, after outcry and a meeting between the organization and Borisov, he issued an apology. In the same year, Gemini worked with Population Services International on reducing the transmission of HIV in high-risk groups, as well as collaborating with other organizations in drafting the Bulgarian Law for Protection against Discrimination, a homosexual non-discrimination law.

In 2004, Gemini organized the first lesbian and gay international conference in Bulgaria, entitled “Preventing and Combating Discrimination.” In the same year, Gemini also hosted the Annual Conference of the International Lesbian and Gay Youth and Students Organization.

Gemini launched the first Bulgarian gay radio broadcast in 2006. The show enjoyed widespread popularity and was aired live every Sunday. In October of the same year, Gemini hosted the International Lesbian and Gay Association’s annual European conference. Two years earlier, Sofia had been elected by 221 representatives of national European member organizations. The conference, focusing on European families, was attended by delegates of ILGA member organizations, as well as other human rights activists.

2006 was also a year in court for Gemini. In coalition with 67 human rights organizations, Gemini brought a member of Parliament to court for alleged discrimination against and harassment of gay people. Gemini also brought three other lawsuits before the Bulgarian Anti-Discrimination Commission that year: against the Municipality of Varna, Sofia Central District Police Station and a national daily newspaper. Gemini won two of the cases and came to an agreement concerning the third one.

Later Gemini continued with several projects, focusing on enforcing the anti-discrimination law in schools and workplaces. It has organized a Pride event for Saturday, June 28, 2008. Shortly after that Gemini discontinued its work and is currently non-operational.

The president of the organisation was Desislava Petrova, a lesbian.

== See also ==
- LGBT rights in Bulgaria
