= Medical Association of Malta =

The Medical Association of Malta is a professional association for doctors in Malta. It is affiliated to the World Medical Association.

It was founded, initially as the Medical Officers Union, in 1954 by Dr Vincent Tabone.

Dr. Patrick Sammut is the president of the Council of the association for 2025.

It organised a satellite meeting for the Commonwealth People's Forum during the Commonwealth Heads of Government Meeting 2015 which was held in Malta in November 2015. Sir Michael Marmot spoke on social inequality.

It opposes private sector involvement in the management of the Maltese health system.
