= European Structural and Investment Funds in Bulgaria =

European financier program for Bulgaria

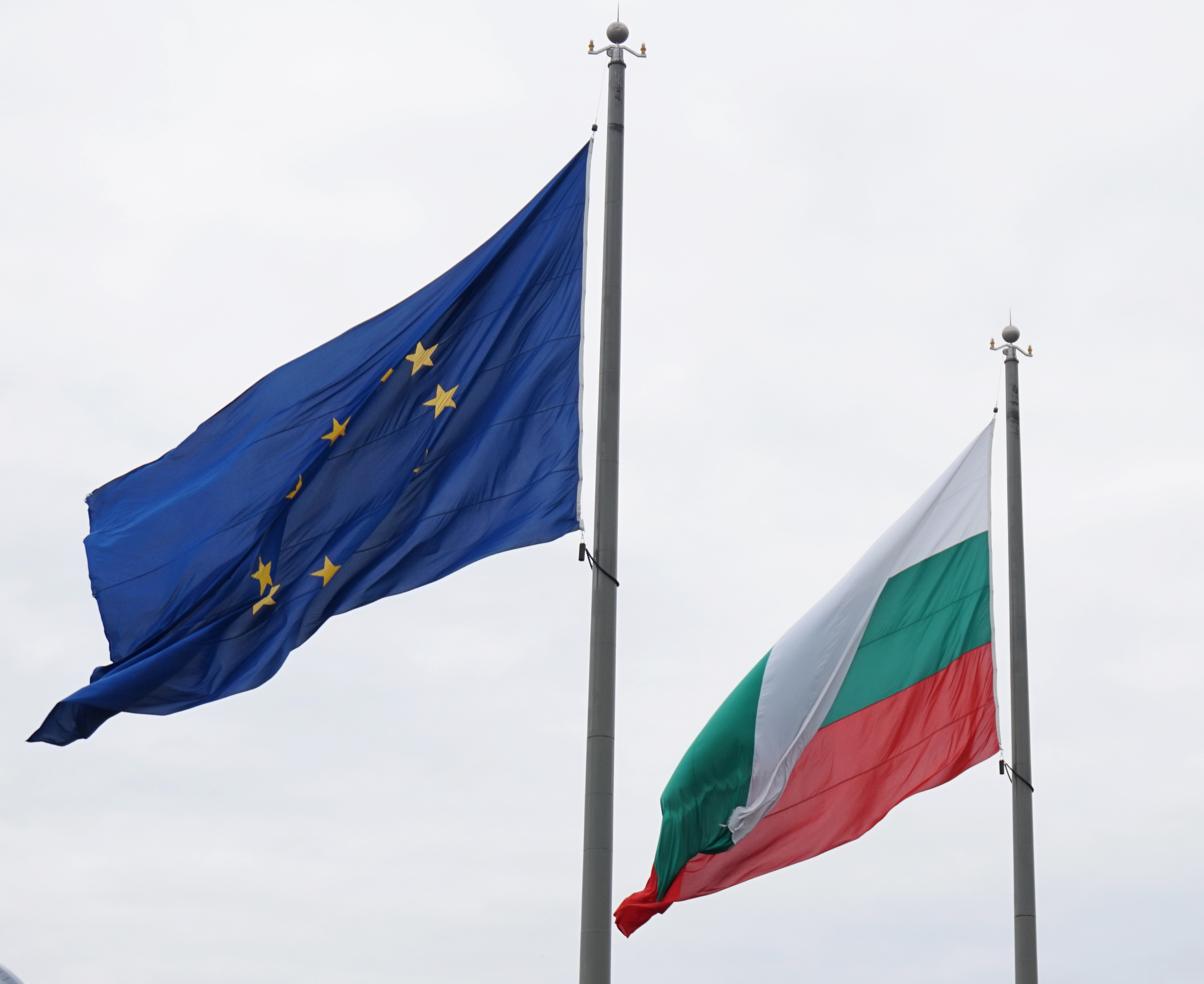
The flag of Bulgaria next to the flag of Europe

Since its accession in the European Union in 2007, Bulgaria has been part of the EU's Cohesion Policy. This program introduces financial instruments, also known as the European Structural and Investment Funds, which aim to reduce the gap between different regions of the EU and improve their economic wellbeing.

Bulgaria is currently in its second Cohesion Policy program period, spanning from 2014 to 2020, with the first starting at its accession and ending in 2013. The European Structural and Investment Funds have had a positive effect on the growth of employment, economic growth, and new infrastructure. In addition, there are many visible results from implemented projects in the field of transport, regional development, environment, and agriculture.

== Types of Funding ==
The European Structural and Investment Funds (ESI Funds) are the European Union's main investment policy tools. Currently they fall under five categories: European Regional Development Fund (ERDF), European Social Fund (ESF), Cohesion Fund (CF), European Agricultural Fund for Rural Development, and the European Maritime and Fisheries Fund (EMFF). During the 2007-2013 Cohesion Policy period, the European Union has allocated more than 346 billion Euros in order to foster economic growth, reduce disparities between different regions, and overall increase the well-being of the union. Regions that are less developed are given priority over more developed ones. The policy envisions that develop regions will indirectly benefit from the growth of the underdeveloped regions by things like trade. In addition, during the 2007-2013 period the program has created more than 1 million jobs, which is about 1/3 of all jobs created in the union, as well as funded the construction of more than 4900 km of roads, the upgrade of more than 2400 km of roads. The program also focuses on giving money to save and preserve the environment, with more than 1300 joint projects for managing natural resources, as well as boost culture and tourism, and increase the quality of life in cities.

The EU Cohesion policy is realised in three different dimensions, as stated in article 3 of the Treaty on European Union. These three dimensions are economic, social, and territorial cohesion. Each of these, in turn, will affect different EU Policies.

=== Economic Cohesion ===
One of the goals of this dimension is to Lower costs to comply with uniform standards and minimum safety requirements, which will benefit the Single market, the Environment policy, the Competition policy, the Common agricultural policy, and the Common transport policy that the EU is trying to achieve. Another goal is to improve the energy efficiency, which will lead to a Common energy policy and better implementation of the Climate change policy. Lastly, this dimension focuses on converging the economic cycle, which will benefit the Eurozone.

=== Social Cohesion ===
The main focus of this dimension is to achieve convergence of national social models and to gradually establish a single EU social model. This will lead to improvement of the EU's Social policy, Education policy, Health care policy, Fiscal policy, Eurozone. In addition, a main goal is to bridge the gap between Western and Eastern Europe, which will lead to the Common foreign policy, the Common security and defense policy, the Neighborhood policy, and the Development policy.

=== Territorial Cohesion ===
The main focus of this dimension is to lower logistic and transportation costs, to lower investment cost, and to improve internet connection, which will benefit the Single market and will foster growth in tourism.

== Cohesion Policy period 2007-2013 in Bulgaria ==
In the 2007-2013 Cohesion Policy period, Bulgaria has received more than 6.7 billion Euros through seven operational programs: Administrative Capacity, Competitiveness, Environment, Human Resources, Regional Development, Transport, and Technical Assistance.

For that period Bulgaria's progress has been steady, with 100% contracting ratio, payment ratio of 95%, and EC contracting ratio of 81% This was the start of the process of cohesion in Bulgaria, which was characterised by increasing pace of absorption and enhancements of monitoring of activity.

=== Priorities of the program in Bulgaria ===
One of the priorities of the program has been improving transportation because the infrastructure in Bulgaria is underdeveloped in comparison to other regions, which is creating a gap. Another has been funding research and innovation because Bulgaria has a relatively low rate of innovation, compared to other regions of the EU. In addition, increasing the rate of innovation can also benefit the growth of the economy. Business support has also been a crucial goal in achieving cohesion. More than 67 million Euros have been allocated in developing connectivity and internet services because play a part in all part of the economy. Finally, an important aspect of the cohesion process has been managing environmental and energy projects. Conservation of energy and using green fuel is a goal of the EU, so Bulgaria has had to make changes in order to contribute to it.

Distribution of the ERDF and CF 2007–2013 in Bulgaria
Thematic Area	%
Innovation & RTD	4.5
Entrepreneurship & Enterprise	8.9
ICT (citizens & business, broadband)	0.8
Environment	25.4
Energy	5.4
Transport	38.8
Culture & social infrastructure	6.1
Territorial dimension	3.5
Technical assistance, capacity building	6.6

=== Impact ===
The European funds have had a strong positive impact on the short-term and long-term competitiveness of Bulgaria. There has been an estimated 10.5% GDP growth for the period higher than a projected growth without the EU funds. There has also been growth in the competitiveness of Bulgaria in the form of increase of the volume of private investments, with an estimate 38.2% higher than a scenario without EU funds. In addition, there have been more than 1,300 new jobs created, in addition to helping more than 137,000 people to acquire or upgrade their vocational qualification and over 178,000 persons to acquire key competencies. There have been several successful projects including improving educational infrastructure for over 30,000 students and pupils, enabling more than 398,000 m^{2} of renovated parks, pedestrian areas, bicycle lanes, playgrounds, providing scholarships to 172,000 students, providing social services in a family environment for more than 51,000 persons, modernising 20 cultural facilities, and investing in energy saving measures in public buildings and schools that couldn't have been completed in the period without the EU funds. The unemployment rate has also been reduced by 6.2%.

"EU cohesion policy" (PDF). blogs.unwe.bg. 2016.

=== Successful Projects that have used ESI funding ===
==== Sofia Tech Park ====
More than 36 million Euros were allocated in the creation of the South Tech Park in Sofia, the capital city of Bulgaria. The place has created an environment of innovation, with its main focus being the fields of information and communication technologies, life science, and green energy. The goal of Sofia Tech Park is to create a dialogue between academia and business, while also providing grounds for the development of start-ups and innovation, while marketing new technology products and services.

==== Sofia Metro Extension ====
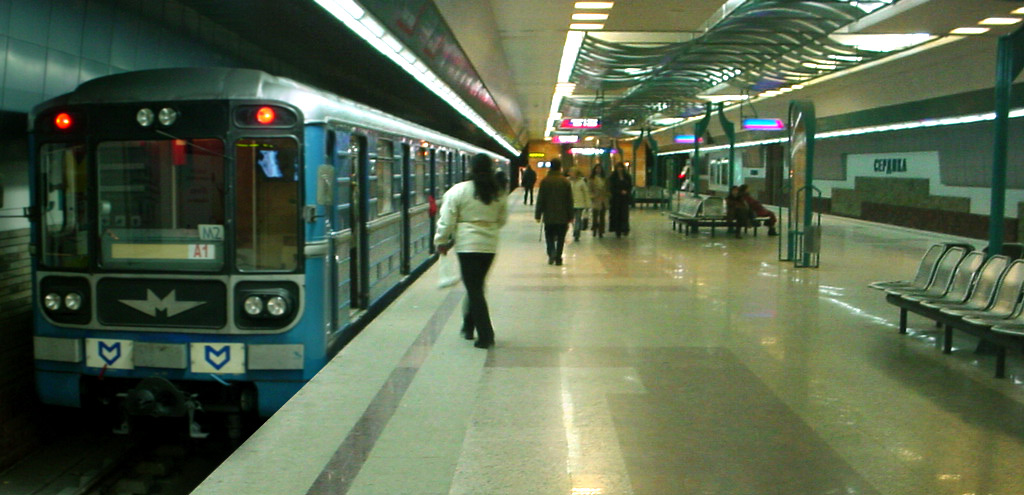
Serdica Station, Center, Sofia

More than 239 million Euros were allocated for the expansion of Sofia's underground metro system. The project was funded under the Transport Operational programme. The result is a 39 km of metro lines with 34 stops. It has been estimated that the metro system serves more than 50,000 passengers per hour and has significantly decreased the traffic in the capital. The project was completed before the deadline and sufficient funds were saved in the process. The EU will keep funding the program in order to reach its final goal of 56 km of metro lines and 53 stations by 2020.

==== Reconstruction and Modernisation of Sarafovo Fishing Port ====
Around 3.5 million Euros were allocated to renovate and modernise Burgas' fishing port. This was done in order to limit illegal fishing activities. By implementing a controlled market, fishermen can sell their produce legally and directly, which also benefits the customer, who can buy fish without going through a reseller. As a result of its modernisation, the port now provides, electricity, water, and internet to each fishing vessel, as well as providing the necessary conditions for storing on-board fish.

== Cohesion Policy period 2014-2020 in Bulgaria ==
For the 2014-2020 cohesion period Bulgaria will manage seven programs with a total budget of more than 7.6 billion Euros. Transport and Environment will receive funds from the European Regional Development Fund (ERDF) and the Cohesion Funds, the Innovation & Competitiveness program and the Regional Development program will be funded by the ERDF, European Social Fund (ESF) will allocate funds for the Human Resources Development and the Good Governance program, and the Science and Education program will be funded by both ESF and ERDF.

Budget Allocation for the different programs of the EU Cohesion Policy in Euros
ERDF	3.57 Billion
ESF	1.52 Billion
Cohesion Funds	2.28 Billion
European Territorial Cooperation	165.6 million
Youth Employment Initiative	55.2 million

=== Priorities and Goals ===
The EU has put forward a list of goals that Bulgaria has agreed to achieve by the end of 2020 under their partnership agreement, which will be possible with the help of the ESI funds:

- R&D expenditure in relation to GDP is to increase to 1.5% (2020), increasing to 31.10% of the enterprises realized innovation activities;
- The share of RES energy in gross final energy consumption to rise to 16% (2020) and the share of energy from renewable sources in transport to reach 10%;
- Higher energy efficiency by 25% until 2020;
- Employment among the population aged 20 to 64 years - 76% for 2020 (versus 63.5% in 2013): reduced level of unemployed youths aged 15–29 to 7% in 2020; achieving employment rate among older persons (55–64 years of age) of 53% in 2020;
- Reducing the number of people living in poverty by 260 000 until 2020;
- Share of students dropping out of the educational system to decrease to 11% for 2020 (versus 12.5% in 2013);
- Share of persons aged 30–34 with completed higher or equivalent education: 36% for 2020 (versus 29.4% in 2013);
- Reduced time for providing administrative services with 50% compared to 2013;

=== Implementation ===
In order for the funds allocated under the Cohesion Policy program to be effectively implemented, the EU has set certain preconditions for Bulgaria to receive funds. The purpose of these preconditions is to ensure that the funds received are implemented to their best extent. Examples of such preconditions are implementation of certain European Union legislation or prioritisings projects that in some way or another are strategic to the EU.

In addition, to make the process easier, beneficiaries will benefit from reduced administrative burden, digitalised communication with the managing authorities, standardised application and reporting forms, etc., in an attempt to encourage more people to apply for funding and help reach the set goals.
