= Sofia Pride =

LGBTQ event in Sofia, Bulgaria

Sofia Pride София Прайд
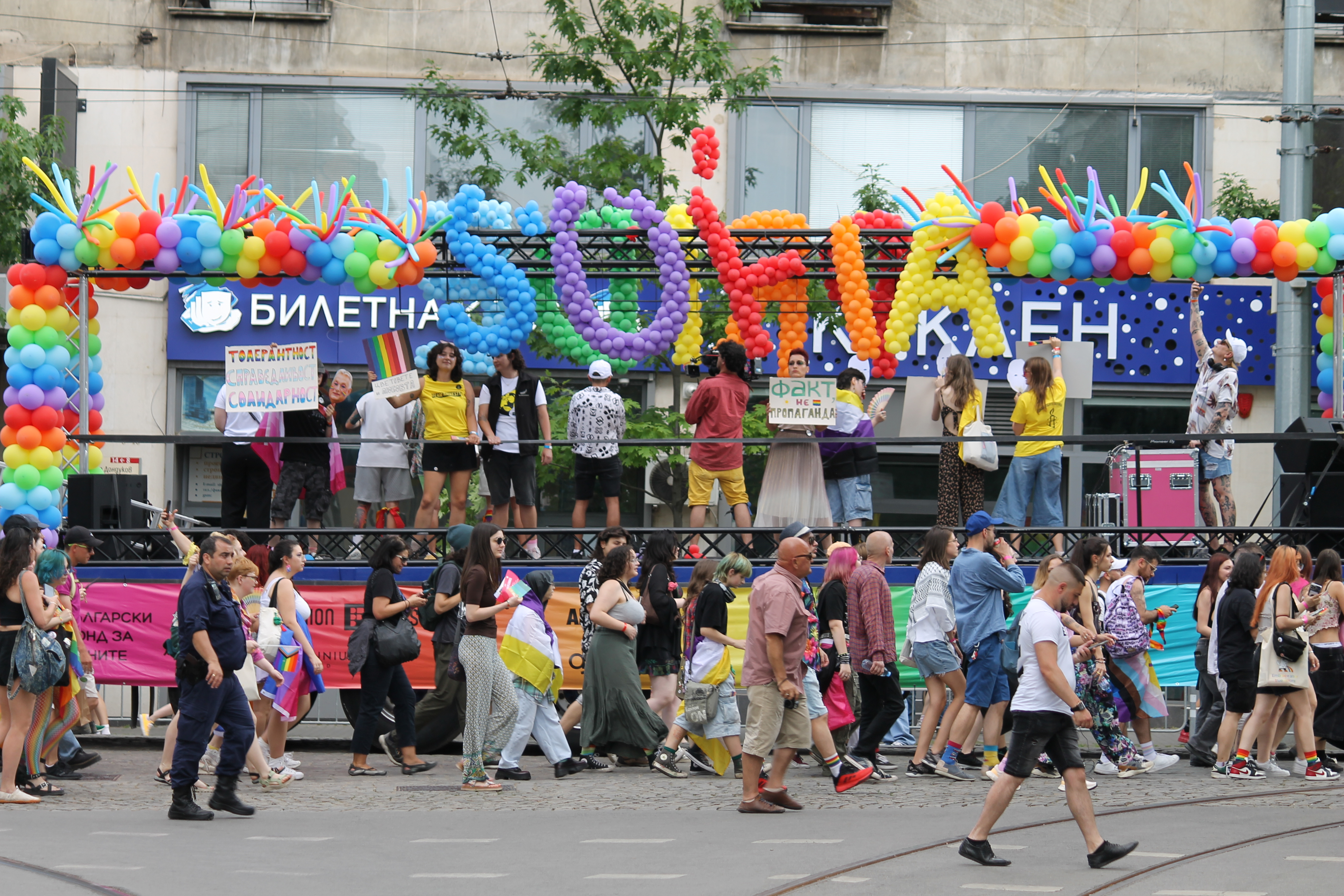
- Frequency: Annual
- Location: Sofia
- Country: Bulgaria
- Inaugurated: June 28, 2008
- Most recent: June 13, 2026
- Website: https://en.sofiapride.org/

Sofia Pride is an annual peaceful march of LGBT people and their relatives and friends, which combines social and political protest with entertainment such as live concerts. It takes place every year in the month of June in Bulgaria's capital Sofia, since 2008. The first Sofia Pride parade was held on June 28, 2008, on the same date as the Stonewall riots in New York City that occurred in 1969. Same-sex sexual activity became legal on May 1, 1968. Between 1968 and the collapse of communism in 1989, no publicly gay movements nor places of social gatherings existed. After democracy was established in 1990, several gay bars and clubs opened doors in the capital of Sofia as well as in Varna and Plovdiv.

Some consider it the most massive public demonstration in support of human rights in Bulgaria, articulating a protest against xenophobia and a way to show LGBT friends and relatives love and support but also as an inspiration for confidence and pride in LGBT people and all minorities who feel oppressed and suffer from society's prejudice. While the event is supported by many national and international partners and representatives of the diplomatic community in Bulgaria as well as Human Rights Organizations, it also polarizes. Many citizens consider the Sofia Pride a provocation and an unnecessary spectacle, claiming the event has little purpose but to offend.

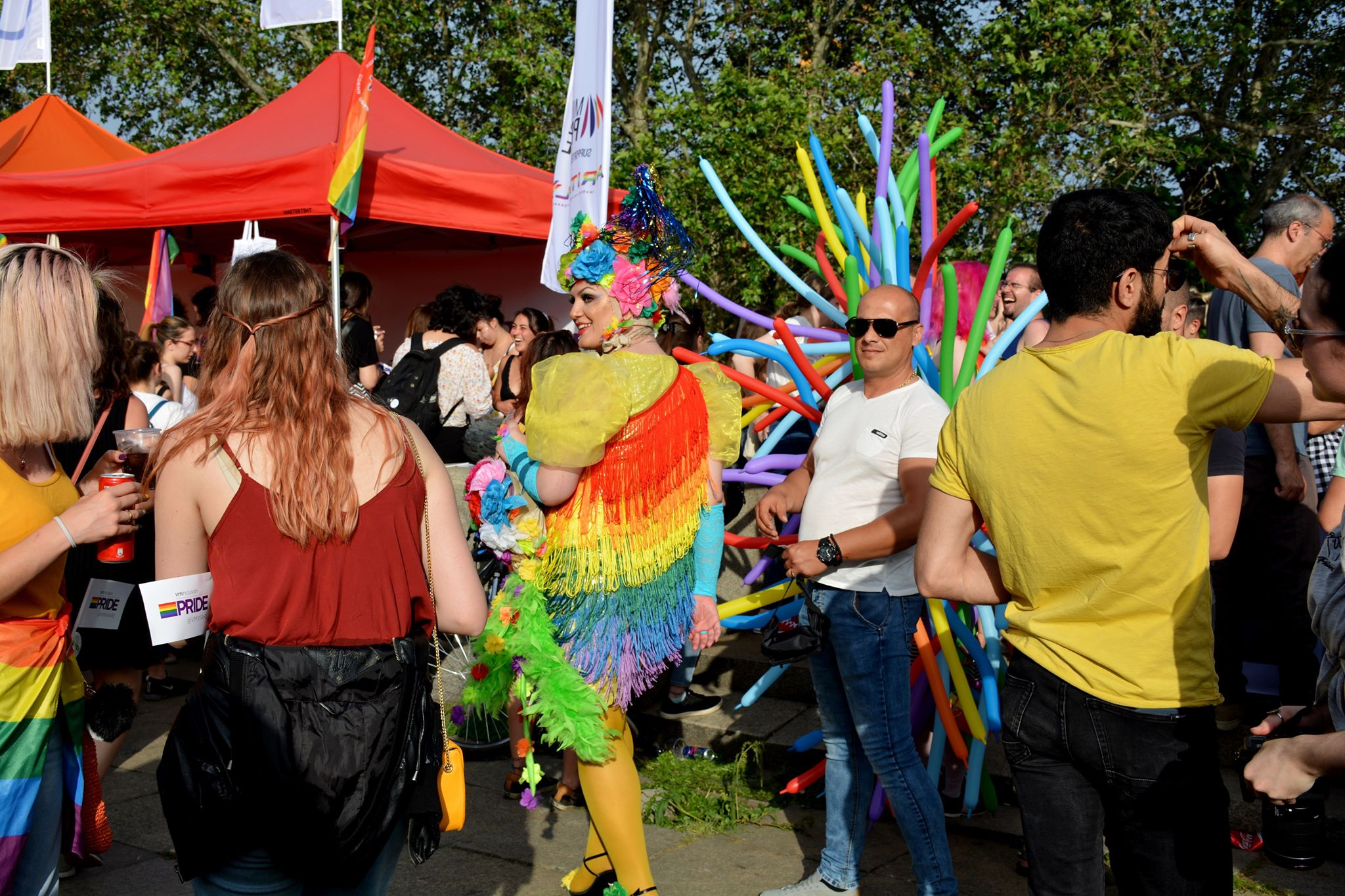
Sofia Pride 2019

In 1992, BGO Gemini was founded, giving gay people some representation and visibility. It was the largest pro-LGBT non-profit organization in Bulgaria, until it ceased operations in 2009. The main LGBT rights organization in Bulgaria right now is "Action" ("Действие" in Bulgarian). The non-profit has over 4500 fans on Facebook as of January 2017. Since 2012 the Sofia Pride is organized by a committee consisting of volunteers and independent NGOs. The administrative face of the event is Bilitis Resource Center Foundation.

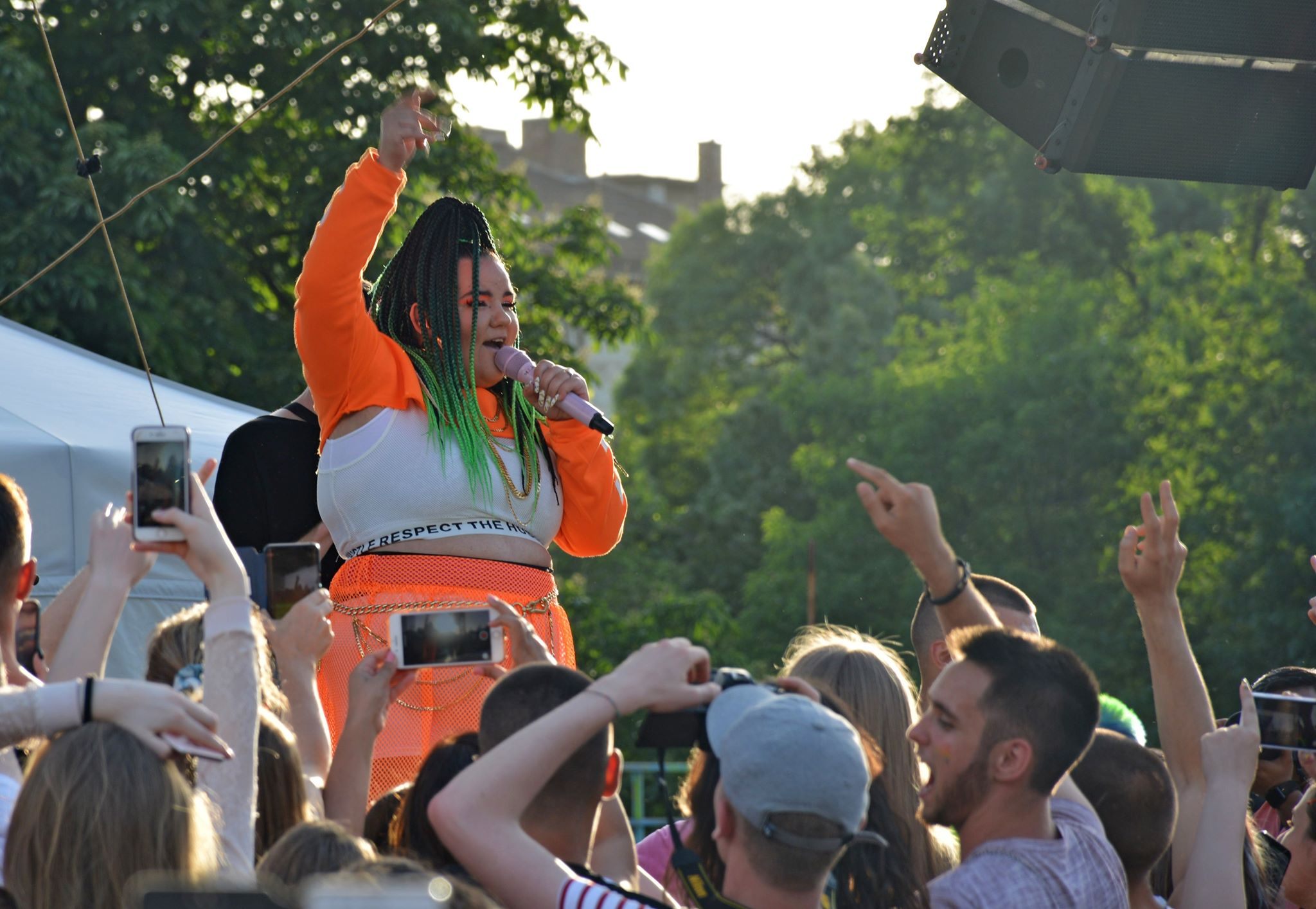
Netta at Sofia Pride 2019

In 2019, around 6000 attendees marched on the pride parade.

== First Sofia Pride ==
Forty years after being gay became legal, the very first Pride Parade came into existence. The first Sofia Pride parade, organized by the BGO Gemini, was held on June 28, 2008, and it was attended by some 120 people. Violence characterized the first pride in the country. No one was hurt but the attempt to attack the people participating in the parade proved the high level of hatred towards gay people. Before the parade 70 ultra nationalists and skinheads were already arrested by police. The police was well organized and successfully prevented any casualties.

== Second Sofia Pride ==
The second Sofia Pride Parade was held on June 27, 2009, with no arrests and violence this time during the march. More people attended, in between 150 and 300. The second pride was very successful and people waved from the open windows of their homes, there was also less spoken political opposition towards the pride. However, the Bulgarian Orthodox Church (BOC) made an anti-parade statement (they also made one during the first held parade) since a few days earlier a young theologist from the Theologic Faculty of the University of Sofia made their anti-pride parade, for which they were vastly mocked. Nonetheless, public opinion paid attention to this even more (BOC also made it difficult to introduce domestic partnership in the Bulgarian Family law the same year).

Ten foreign embassies (later 12) in Bulgaria were the first to officially support the second Sofia Pride parade. The political party Bulgarian Greens ("Zelenite") officially supported the pride by issuing a statement of support on June 15, 2009. Three days later the Bulgarian Socialist Youth declared its support too.

== Third Sofia Pride ==
The third Sofia Pride Parade took place on June 26, 2010. Over 700 participants attended, making it the biggest parade in the country to that date. For the first time a party representative in the Bulgarian Parliament issued a statement of support, them being Democrats for a Strong Bulgaria as well as Bulgarian Greens ("Zelenite") and the Bulgarian Socialist Youth. The parade was the closing event of a one-week program of culture events, photo exhibition and discussions.

== Fourth Sofia Pride ==
The fourth Sofia Pride took place on June 18, 2011, and drew over 1200 participants and the support of over 11 embassies. The parade ended with a concert in a park in the city center. No accidents were reported except for five men who attended and got attacked after the parade.

=== Political support ===
On May 20, 2011, Georgi Kadiev, a Sofia City Counsel Member and Socialist candidate for the mayoralty, issued a statement of support calling for a proclamation of support by the City Counsel and the Mayor Yordanka Fandakova as well. On June 13, a statement of support was issued by the Ambassador of The Netherlands to Bulgaria, Karel van Kesteren. The British Embassy, which the pride march passes, flew the rainbow flag in support.

== Fifth Sofia Pride ==
The fifth Sofia Pride parade took place on June 30, 2012. София Прайд - More than 2000 people participated. The official slogan was "Разкрий цветовете си" ("Show your colors"), inviting LGBT people to overcome fear and shame imposed on them and stop hiding (being forced to hide) their sexual orientation from their families, friends and colleagues.

=== Political support ===
The fifth Sofia Pride was supported by a joint statement of several foreign missions in Bulgaria issued by the Embassy of the United States of America to Bulgaria, signed by the Netherlands Embassy, German Embassy, British Embassy and 8 other missions to Bulgaria.

The Green party politician Volker Beck from the German Bundestag came in support of the event as well as the Ambassador of the British Embassy to Bulgaria Mr. Jonathan Allen and the US Ambassador at the time Mr. James Warlick.

Several Human Rights organizations such as Amnesty International and Human Rights Watch were additionally supporting the event.

== Sixth Sofia Pride ==
The sixth Sofia Pride was planned on June 22, 2013, but got postponed until 21 September 2013 amid security concerns. The main theme in 2013 was "acceptance”. The slogan was “Различни хора, равни права” ("Diverse people, equal rights").

"Sofia Pride Art Week" and a Sofia Pride Film Festival featuring several films from around the world, focusing on the lives and concerns of LGBT people, went ahead as planned in the week before 22 June 2013. The Art week consists of a series of cultural events, exhibitions and discussion rounds on the topic of LGBT life.

=== Political support ===
The sixth Sofia Pride was again supported by a joint statement of several foreign missions in Bulgaria issued by the German Embassy to Bulgaria, signed by the Embassies of Austria, Belgium, Denmark, Finland, France, Ireland, Lithuania, Netherlands, Norway, Serbia, South Africa, Great Britain and the United States of America to Bulgaria.

== Tenth Sofia Pride ==
the Tenth Sofia Pride was attended by more than 3000 participants and was supported by 18 diplomatic missions. The pride week also included a film program and an art festival.

== Eleventh Sofia Pride ==
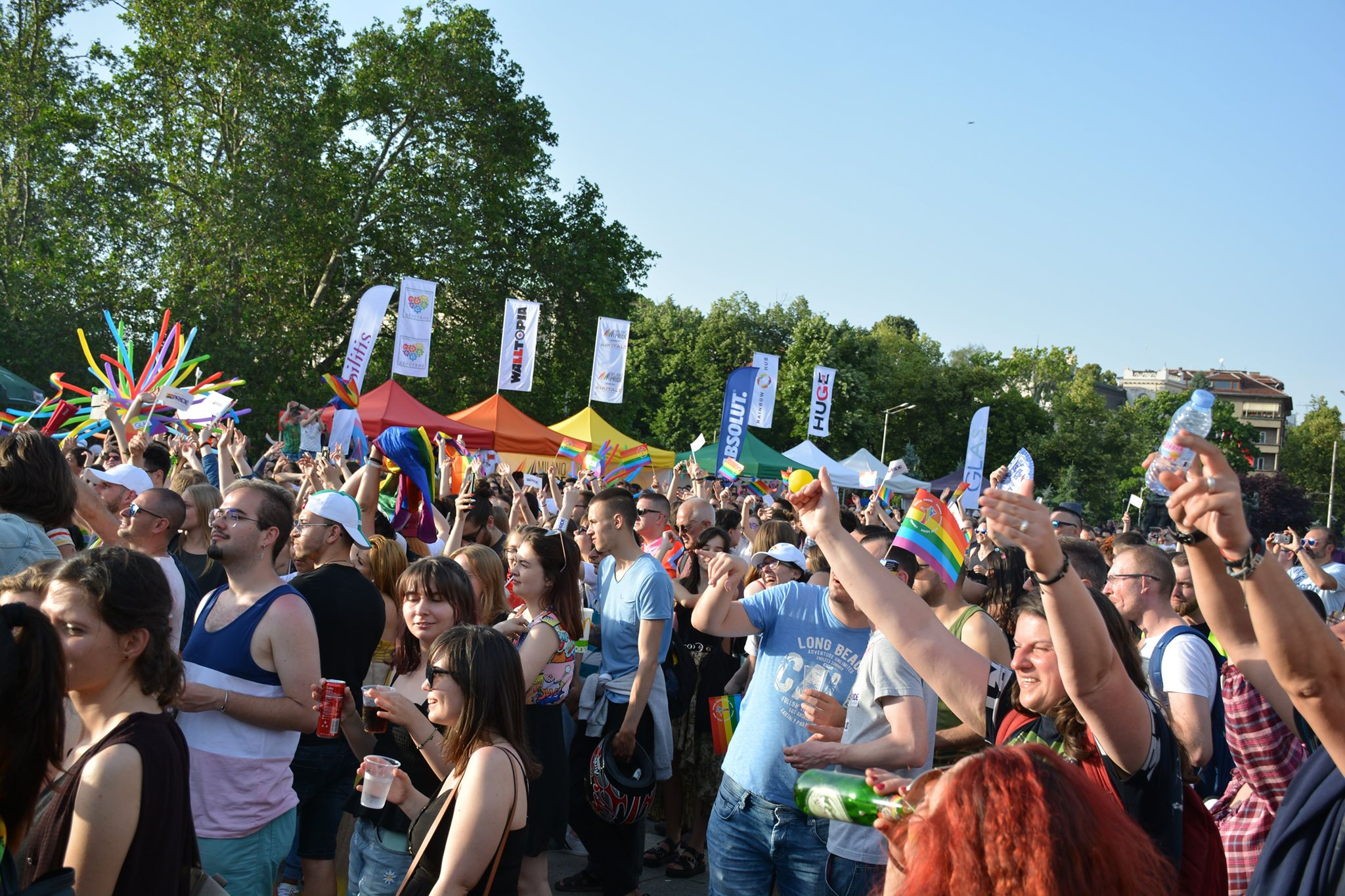
Sofia Pride 2019

== Twelfth Sofia Pride ==
The twelfth Sofia Pride parade took place on June 8, 2019. The official slogan was "Не давай власт на омразата" ("Don’t give power to hatred").

Famous singers such as Galena, Mihaela Fileva, Mila Robert and the 2018 Eurovision winner, Netta, performed in the event. It is estimated that around 6000 attendees marched on the pride parade. It was supported by 25 diplomats and representatives of international organizations and foundations.

== Fourteenth Sofia Pride ==
The fourteenth Sofia Pride parade took place on June 12, 2021. Beforehand several LGBTIQ Events were attacked in Sofia, Plovdiv and Burgas. At the Pride concert Vasil Garvanliev and the Bulgarian artist Victoria Georgieva played. It was the biggest Pride event in Sofia so far.

== Fifteenth Sofia Pride ==
The fifteenth Sofia Pride took place on June 18, 2022. Over 12 000 people attended. Kamelia, Papi Hans and a guest from Ukraine - the singer Constantine - performed in support of the cause.

== See also ==
- List of LGBT events
- LGBT rights in Bulgaria
