= The Masked Singer (Bulgarian TV series) =

Bulgarian singing competition television show

- Genre: Reality competition
- Based on: King of Mask Singer by Munhwa Broadcasting Corporation
- Presented by: Dimitar Rachkov; Vasil Vasilev - Zueka; Gerasim Georgiev - Gero; Krasimir Radkov
- Opening theme: Who Are You
- Country of origin: Bulgaria
- Original language: Bulgarian
- No. of seasons: 3
- No. of episodes: 39 (+3 specials)

Original release
- Network: Nova
- Release: 14 September 2019 – 4 December 2021

The Masked Singer (Bulgarian: Маскираният певец, romanized: Maskiraniyat pevets) is a Bulgarian reality singing competition television series based on the Masked Singer franchise which originated from the South Korean version of the show King of Mask Singer. It premiered on Nova on 14 September 2019 to 4 December 2021

All episodes of the series are broadcast live.

== Cast ==
Panelist	Season		
Panelist	1	2	3
Hosts
Dimitar Rachkov	Main		
Vasil Vasilev - Zueka	Main		
Gerasim Georgiev - Gero	Panel	Main	
Krasimir Radkov			Main
Main Panelists
Niki Kunchev	Main		
Gala	Main		Guest
Gerasim Georgiev - Gero	Main	Host	
Maria Ilieva	Main		Mask
Azis		Main	
Aleksandra Raeva		Main	
Vladimir Penev		Main	
Martina Vachkova		Guest	Main
Guest Panelists
Yulian Vergov	Guest		
Argirovi brothers	Guest		
Lubo Kirov	Guest		
Mihaela Marinova	Mask	Guest	
Viktor Kalev		Guest	
Nikolay Sotirov		Guest	
Lyubomir Neykov		Guest	
Stefania Koleva		Guest	
Yana Marinova		Guest	
Toncho Tokmakchiev		Guest	
Dimiter Marinov		Guest	
Krisko		Guest	
Judy Halvadjian		Guest	

== Series overview ==
Series overview
Series	Contestants	Episodes	Originally released		Winner	Runner-up	Third place
Series	Contestants	Episodes	First released	Last released	Winner	Runner-up	Third place
1	16	13	14 September 2019	7 December 2019	Mihaela Marinova as "Raven"	Zhana Bergendorff as "Rose"	Magi Dzhanavarova as "Bee"
2	14	13	12 September 2020	5 December 2020	Borislav Zahariev as "Baba Yaga"	Nevena Tsoneva as "Bride"	Christiana Louizu as "Predator"
3	14	13	11 September 2021	4 December 2021	Victoria Georgieva as "Miss"	Krisia as "Mushroom"	Miro as "Rhino"

== Format ==
Famous celebrities perform songs that they choose for three months. Unique, created especially for the show costumes of animals and mythical creatures hide the identity of the participants at each of their performances on stage. Neither the show team nor even the friends and families of the participants know their identities. All masks are guarded and protected with exceptional security measures. Each week the participants are divided into groups and enter into a musical battle with each other. Before each performance are revealed clues to help the audience discover them. Additionally, the detectives of the show help the spectators, who give their assumptions after each performance.

Viewers vote for the performances of the participants. The one who collects the smallest votes drops out and takes off the mask. The winner is the one who takes off the mask last.

== Season 1 ==
Results
Stage name	Celebrity	Occupation	Episodes												
Stage name	Celebrity	Occupation	1	2	3	4	5	6	7	8	9	10	11	12	13
Raven	Mihaela Marinova	Singer		WIN		RISK		WIN		WIN	RISK	RISK	WIN	SAFE	WINNER
Rose	Zhana Bergendorff	Singer	WIN		RISK		WIN		WIN		WIN	WIN	RISK	SAFE	RUNNER-UP
Bee	Magi Dzhanavarova	Singer		WIN		WIN		WIN		WIN	WIN	WIN	WIN	SAFE	THIRD
Chicken	Divna	Singer	WIN		WIN		RISK		WIN		WIN	WIN	RISK	OUT	
Princess	Alisia	Singer	RISK		WIN		WIN		WIN		RISK	WIN	WIN	OUT	
Mummer	Nencho Balabanov	Actor	WIN		WIN		RISK		RISK		WIN	RISK	OUT		
Hat	Katsi Vaptsarov	TV host		RISK		WIN		RISK		RISK	RISK	OUT			
Owl	Valentin Mihov	Footballer		WIN		WIN		WIN		WIN	OUT				
Lion	Albena Mihova	Actress	RISK		RISK		WIN			OUT					
Butterfly	Preyah	Singer		RISK		WIN		RISK	OUT						
Scotsman	Julian Konstantinov	TV host/Singer		WIN		RISK		OUT							
Bull	Filip Avramov	Actor	RISK		WIN		OUT								
Star	Encho Danailov	TV host/Actor		RISK		OUT									
Knight	Dimo Aleksiev	Actor	WIN		OUT										
Cocoon	Dzhuliana Gani	Model		OUT											
Peacock	Ivan Zvezdev	Chef	OUT												

The masked singer won their face-off and remained in the competition.
The masked singer lost their face-off and was in the bottom three, but was not eliminated.
The masked singer was safe from elimination.
The masked singer was eliminated from the competition and unmasked upon their elimination.
The masked singer did not perform.

=== Week 1 (14 September) ===
Performances on the first episode
#	Stage name	Song	Identity	Result
1	Bull	"Du Hast" by Rammstein	undisclosed	RISK
2	Knight	"My Way" by Frank Sinatra	undisclosed	WIN
3	Rose	"Who Wants To Live Forever" by Queen	undisclosed	WIN
4	Princess	"Loquita" by Claydee & Eleni Foureira	undisclosed	RISK
5	Mummer	"Can You Feel the Love Tonight" by Elton John	undisclosed	WIN
6	Peacock	"Volare" by Domenico Modugno	Ivan Zvezdev	OUT
7	Chicken	"Gasolina" by Daddy Yankee	undisclosed	WIN
8	Lion	"Pink" by Aerosmith	undisclosed	RISK

=== Week 2 (21 September) ===
Performances on the second episode
#	Stage name	Song	Identity	Result
1	Hat	"No Escape" by Dubioza koletiv	undisclosed	RISK
2	Owl	"Аз и ти" by D2	undisclosed	WIN
3	Bee	"Whenever, Wherever" by Shakira	undisclosed	WIN
4	Cocoon	"Justify My Love" by Madonna	Dzhuliana Gani	OUT
5	Star	"Dragostea Din Tei" by O-Zone	undisclosed	RISK
6	Scotsman	"Old Man River" by The Righteous Brothers	undisclosed	WIN
7	Raven	"Love of My Life" by Queen	undisclosed	WIN
8	Butterfly	"Smells Like Teen Spirit" by Nirvana	undisclosed	RISK

=== Week 3 (28 September) ===
Performances on the third episode
#	Stage name	Song	Identity	Result
1	Knight	"Боби" by Wickeda	Dimo Aleksiev	OUT
2	Bull	"Hallelujah" by Leonard Cohen	undisclosed	WIN
3	Mummer	"Bamboléo" by Gipsy Kings	undisclosed	WIN
4	Lion	"Wrecking Ball" by Miley Cyrus	undisclosed	RISK
5	Princess	"Summertime Sadness" by Lana Del Rey	undisclosed	WIN
6	Rose	"You Shook Me All Night Long" by AC/DC	undisclosed	RISK
7	Chicken	"Stayin' Alive" by Bee Gees	undisclosed	WIN

=== Week 4 (5 October) ===
Performances on the fourth episode
#	Stage name	Song	Identity	Result
1	Star	"Ai Se Eu Te Pego" by Michel Teló	Encho Danailov	OUT
2	Owl	"Let It Be" by The Beatles	undisclosed	WIN
3	Butterfly	"Money" by Cardi B	undisclosed	WIN
4	Bee	"Hello" by Adele	undisclosed	WIN
5	Raven	"Proud Mary" by Tina Turner	undisclosed	RISK
6	Hat	"Disko Partizani" by Shantel	undisclosed	WIN
7	Scotsman	"Soli" by Adriano Celentano	undisclosed	RISK

=== Week 5 (12 October) ===
Performances on the fifth episode
#	Stage name	Song	Identity	Result
1	Bull	"Let's Twist Again" by Chubby Checker	Filip Avramov	OUT
2	Lion	"Shallow" by Lady Gaga & Bradley Cooper	undisclosed	WIN
3	Mummer	"Send Me An Angel" by Scorpions	undisclosed	RISK
4	Rose	"The Winner Takes It All" by ABBA	undisclosed	WIN
5	Princess	"Вярвам в теб" by Deep Zone Project	undisclosed	WIN
6	Chicken	"At Last" by Etta James	undisclosed	RISK

=== Week 6 (19 October) ===
Performances on the sixth episode
#	Stage name	Song	Identity	Result
1	Hat	"Perfect" by Ed Sheeran	undisclosed	RISK
2	Raven	"Feeling Good" by Michael Bublé	undisclosed	WIN
3	Scotsman	"Love Me Tender" by Elvis Presley	Julian Konstantinov	OUT
4	Bee	"Wannabe" by Spice Girls	undisclosed	WIN
5	Butterfly	"Wicked Game" by Chris Isaak	undisclosed	RISK
6	Owl	"Хубава си моя горо"	undisclosed	WIN

=== Week 7 (26 October) ===
Performances on the seventh episode
#	Stage name	Song	Identity	Result
1	Mummer	"Black or White" by Michael Jackson	undisclosed	RISK
2	Princess	"Hit the Road Jack" by Ray Charles	undisclosed	WIN
3	Butterfly	"Ain't Nobody" by Chaka Khan	Preyah	OUT
4	Chicken	"Gangnam Style" by PSY	undisclosed	WIN
5	Rose	"Излел е Дельо хайдутин"	undisclosed	WIN

=== Week 8 (2 November) ===
Performances on the eighth episode
#	Stage name	Song	Identity	Result
1	Lion	"Call Me When You're Sober" by Evanescence	Albena Mihova	OUT
2	Owl	"Фалшив герой" by Todor Kolev	undisclosed	WIN
3	Raven	"Thunderstruck" by AC/DC	undisclosed	WIN
4	Hat	"Despacito" by Luis Fonsi	undisclosed	RISK
5	Bee	"God Is A Woman" by Ariana Grande	undisclosed	WIN

=== Week 9 (9 November) ===
Performances on the ninth episode
#	Stage name	Song	Identity	Result
1	Chicken	"Don't Stop Me Now" by Queen	undisclosed	WIN
2	Raven	"Make You Feel My Love" by Adele	undisclosed	RISK
3	Mummer	"Море сокол пие"	undisclosed	WIN
4	Hat	"The Sound of Silence" by Pentatonix	undisclosed	RISK
5	Rose	"Valerie" by Amy Winehouse	undisclosed	WIN
6	Owl	"Мурка" by Vladimir Vysotsky	Valentin Mihov	OUT
7	Bee	"Lose Yourself" by Eminem	undisclosed	WIN
8	Princess	"Unfaithful" by Rihanna	undisclosed	RISK

=== Week 10 (16 November) ===
Performances on the tenth episode
#	Stage name	Song	Identity	Result
1	Bee	"Bang Bang" by Jessie J, Ariana Grande & Nicki Minaj	undisclosed	WIN
2	Mummer	"American Woman" by Lenny Kravitz	undisclosed	RISK
3	Hat	"Шапка ти свалям" by Krisko	Katsi Vaptsarov	OUT
4	Princess	"Истина" by Milena Slavova	undisclosed	WIN
5	Chicken	"Вода" by Elitsa & Stoyan	undisclosed	WIN
6	Rose	"I Will Always Love You" by Whitney Houston	undisclosed	WIN
7	Raven	"Thriller" by Michael Jackson	undisclosed	RISK

=== Week 11 (23 November) ===
Performances on the eleventh episode
#	Stage name	Song	Identity	Result
1	Mummer	"L'Italiano" by Toto Cutugno	Nencho Balabanov	OUT
2	Raven	"Always Remember Us This Way" by Lady Gaga	undisclosed	WIN
3	Princess	"Dirty Diana" by Michael Jackson	undisclosed	WIN
4	Chicken	"Ain't No Other Man" by Christina Aguilera	undisclosed	RISK
5	Rose	"Mother's Daughter" by Miley Cyrus	undisclosed	RISK
6	Bee	"All The Man That I Need" by Whitney Houston	undisclosed	WIN

=== Week 12 (30 November) ===
Performances on the twelfth episode
#	Stage name	Song	Identity	Result
1	Chicken	"Eye of the Tiger" by Survivor	Divna	OUT
2	Princess	"Mercy" by Duffy	Alisia	OUT
3	Rose	"I Put a Spell on You" by Annie Lennox	undisclosed	SAFE
4	Bee	"Think" by Aretha Franklin	undisclosed	SAFE
5	Raven	"Лале ли си, зюмбюл ли си"	undisclosed	SAFE

=== Week 13 (7 December) - Finale ===
Each contestant performed two songs, and performed a group song together, before being unmasked.

- Group Number (Non-Finalists - Albena Mihova, Alisia, Divna, Encho Danailov, Nencho Balabanov, Preyah and Valentin Mihov): "We're Not Gonna Take It" by Twisted Sister

Performances on the thirteenth episode
#	Stage name	Song	Identity	Result
1	Raven	"Mamma Knows Best" by Jessie J	Mihaela Marinova	WINNER
1	Raven	"Never Enough" by Loren Allred	Mihaela Marinova	WINNER
2	Bee	"Високо" by FSB	Magi Dzhanavarova	THIRD
2	Bee	"All I Want for Christmas Is You" by Mariah Carey	Magi Dzhanavarova	THIRD
3	Rose	"Hallelujah" by Alexandra Burke	Zhana Bergendorff	RUNNER-UP
3	Rose	"We Are the Champions" by Queen	Zhana Bergendorff	RUNNER-UP

- Guest Performance: "Rockstar" by Nickelback performed by Philip Avramov as "Tiborg"
- Group Number (Finalists): "One Moment in Time" by Whitney Houston
- Men in Black Performance: "I'm Too Sexy" by Right Said Fred

== New Year's Concert (Season 1) ==
#	Stage name	Song	Identity
1	Butterfly	"So This Is Christmas"	Zhana Bergendorf
2	Bee	"Fighter" by Christina Aguilera	Divna
3	Star	"Speed" by Billy Idol	Nencho Balabanov
4	Princess	"Bohemian Rhapsody" by Queen	Magi Dzhanavarova
5	Rose	"Piece Of My Heart" by Janis Joplin	Roberta
6	Knight	"А дали е така" by Vasil Naydenov	Dimo Aleksiev
7	Lion	"Last Christmas" by Wham!	Preyah
8	Cocoon	"Sorry" by Justin Bieber	Stefan Ilchev
9	Chicken	"O Holy Night" by Mariah Carey	Mihaela Marinova
10	Peacock	"Phantom I Saif Ali Khan" by Afghan Jalebi	Katsi Vaptsarov
11	Hat	"Светът е за двама" by Orlin Goranov	Magarditch Halvadjian

== Season 2 ==
Results
Stage name	Celebrity	Occupation	Episodes												
Stage name	Celebrity	Occupation	1	2	3	4	5	6	7	8	9	10	11	12	13
Baba Yaga	Borislav Zakhariev	Actor	SAFE	WIN		WIN		WIN		WIN	RISK	WIN	WIN	SAFE	WINNER
Bride	Nevena Tsoneva	Singer	SAFE	WIN		RISK		RISK		WIN	WIN	WIN	WIN	SAFE	RUNNER-UP
Predator	Christiana Louizu	Singer	SAFE		WIN		WIN		RISK	RISK	RISK	RISK	RISK	SAFE	THIRD
Macaron	Desi Slava	Singer	SAFE		WIN		WIN		WIN	RISK	WIN	RISK	WIN	OUT	
Golden	Kristian Kirilov	Actor	SAFE	WIN		WIN		WIN		WIN	WIN	WIN	OUT		
Scarecrow	Peyo Filipov	Musician	SAFE	RISK		RISK		WIN		WIN	WIN	OUT			
Baby	Katsi Vaptsarov	TV host	SAFE		WIN		WIN		WIN	RISK	OUT				
Clown	Tedi Katsarova	Singer	SAFE		WIN		RISK		WIN	OUT					
Brain	Georgi Nizamov	Actor	SAFE		RISK		RISK		OUT						
Light	Stefan Ilchev	Singer	SAFE	RISK		WIN		OUT							
Book	Milena Slavova	Singer	SAFE		RISK		OUT								
Angel	Esil Duran	Singer	SAFE	WIN		OUT									
Snake	Boris Soltariĭski	Singer	SAFE		OUT										
Eyes	Poli Genova	Singer	SAFE	OUT											

The masked singer won their face-off and remained in the competition.
The masked singer lost their face-off and was in the bottom three, but was not eliminated.
The masked singer was safe from elimination.
The masked singer was eliminated from the competition and unmasked upon their elimination.
The masked singer did not perform.

=== Week 1 (12 September) ===
- Every contestant performed and was safe from elimination.

Performances on the first episode
#	Stage name	Song	Identity	Result
1	Bride	"My Number One" by Helena Paparizou	undisclosed	SAFE
2	Baba Yaga	"Sweet Dreams" by Marilyn Manson	undisclosed	SAFE
3	Brain	"Камион ме блъсна" by Todor Kolev	undisclosed	SAFE
4	Clown	"Bad Romance" by Lady Gaga	undisclosed	SAFE
5	Snake	"She's All I Ever Had" by Ricky Martin	undisclosed	SAFE
6	Golden	"I'm Too Sexy" by Right Said Fred	undisclosed	SAFE
7	Book	"It Must Have Been Love" by Roxette	undisclosed	SAFE
8	Eyes	"I've Been Thinking About You" by Londonbeat	undisclosed	SAFE
9	Baby	"Черни котараци" by Milenita	undisclosed	SAFE
10	Scarecrow	"In The End" by Linkin Park	undisclosed	SAFE
11	Angel	"Welcome to Burlesque" by Cher	undisclosed	SAFE
12	Light	"GoldenEye" by Tina Turner	undisclosed	SAFE
13	Predator	"This Is Me" by Keala Settle	undisclosed	SAFE
14	Macaron	"Hallelujah" by Alexandra Burke	undisclosed	SAFE

=== Week 2 (19 September) ===
Performances on the second episode
#	Stage name	Song	Identity	Result
1	Eyes	"Paranoid" by Black Sabbath	Poli Genova	OUT
2	Baba Yaga	"Cuban Pete" by Jim Carrey	undisclosed	WIN
3	Bride	"Lady Marmalade" by Christina Aguilera	undisclosed	WIN
4	Scarecrow	"It's My Life" by Dr. Alban	undisclosed	RISK
5	Light	"Daddy Cool" by Boney M.	undisclosed	RISK
6	Golden	"Mambo No. 5" by Lou Bega	undisclosed	WIN
7	Angel	"I Will Always Love You" by Whitney Houston	undisclosed	WIN

- Guest Performance: "What a Wonderful World" by Louis Armstrong performed by Nikolay Sotirov as "Knight"

=== Week 3 (26 September) ===
Performances on the third episode
#	Stage name	Song	Identity	Result
1	Snake	"Bubamara" by Goran Bregović	Boris Soltariĭski	OUT
2	Macaron	"Always Remember Us This Way" by Lady Gaga	undisclosed	WIN
3	Predator	"The Show Must Go On" by Queen	undisclosed	WIN
4	Brain	"Proud Mary" by Tina Turner	undisclosed	RISK
5	Book	"Hot Stuff" by Donna Summer	undisclosed	RISK
6	Baby	"Вселена" by 4 Magic	undisclosed	WIN
7	Clown	"I Kissed a Girl" by Katy Perry	undisclosed	WIN

- Guest Performance: "All About That Bass" by Meghan Trainor performed by Lazara Zlatareva "Kaka Lara" as "Chicken"

=== Week 4 (3 October) ===
Performances on the fourth episode
#	Stage name	Song	Identity	Result
1	Angel	"We Found Love" by Rihanna	Esil Duran	OUT
2	Baba Yaga	"Speed" by Billy Idol	undisclosed	WIN
3	Bride	"It's All Coming Back to Me Now" by Celine Dion	undisclosed	RISK
4	Light	"I Feel It Coming" by The Weeknd	undisclosed	WIN
5	Golden	"Най-щастливият ден" by Kontrol	undisclosed	WIN
6	Scarecrow	"I'm a Believer" by Smash Mouth	undisclosed	RISK

- Guest Performance: "Tears" by Clean Bandit performed by Yoana Dimitrova as "Bee"

=== Week 5 (10 October) ===
Performances on the fifth episode
#	Stage name	Song	Identity	Result
1	Brain	"Междучасие" by Vasil Naydenov	undisclosed	RISK
2	Baby	"Can't Help Falling in Love" by Elvis Presley	undisclosed	WIN
3	Clown	"Lost on You" by LP	undisclosed	RISK
4	Macaron	"Señorita" by Shawn Mendes & Camila Cabello	undisclosed	WIN
5	Predator	"Dance Monkey" by Tones and I	undisclosed	WIN
6	Book	"Nothing Compares 2 U" by Sinéad O'Connor	Milena Slavova	OUT

- Guest Performance: "Believer" by Imagine Dragons performed by Yonislav Yotov "Toto" as "Lion"

=== Week 6 (17 October) ===
Performances on the sixth episode
#	Stage name	Song	Identity	Result
1	Golden	"Livin' la Vida Loca" by Ricky Martin	undisclosed	WIN
2	Bride	"What a Feeling" by Irene Cara	undisclosed	RISK
3	Scarecrow	"Wake Me Up" by Avicii	undisclosed	WIN
4	Baba Yaga	"Wicked Game" by Chris Isaak	undisclosed	WIN
5	Light	"La Luna" by Belinda Carlisle	Stefan Ilchev	OUT

- Guest Performance: "In the Air Tonight" by Phil Collins performed by Slavin Slavchev as "Raven"
- Guest Performance: "Заклинание" by Petar Chernev performed by Dragomir Draganov as "Mummer"

=== Week 7 (24 October) ===
Performances on the seventh episode
#	Stage name	Song	Identity	Result
1	Macaron	"Истина" by Milena Slavova	undisclosed	WIN
2	Predator	"Hero" by Mariah Carey	undisclosed	RISK
3	Brain	"Brother Louie" by Modern Talking	Georgi Nizamov	OUT
4	Baby	"Yes Sir, I Can Boogie" by Baccara	undisclosed	WIN
5	Clown	"Blame It on the Boogie" by The Jacksons	undisclosed	WIN

- Guest Performance: "Миллион алых роз" by Alla Pugacheva performed by Anton Stefanov as "Hat"
- Guest Performance: "One Night Only" by Jennifer Hudson performed by Dara Ekimova as "Princess"

=== Week 8 (31 October) ===
Performances on the eighth episode
#	Stage name	Song	Identity	Result
1	Scarecrow	"Du hast" by Rammstein	undisclosed	WIN
2	Macaron	"I'm Into You" by Jennifer Lopez	undisclosed	RISK
3	Golden	"Bad Boys" by Inner Circle	undisclosed	WIN
4	Predator	"Billie Jean" by Michael Jackson	undisclosed	RISK
5	Bride	"Оставаме" by Margarita Hranova	undisclosed	WIN
6	Clown	"I Follow Rivers" by Lykke Li	Tedi Katsarova	OUT
7	Baba Yaga	"Summer Wine" by Natalia Avelon	undisclosed	WIN
8	Baby	"Bad Guy" by Billie Eilish	undisclosed	RISK

- Guest Performance: "Cotton Eye Joe" by Rednex performed by Tsvetelin Atanasov as "Star"

=== Week 9 (7 November) ===
Performances on the ninth episode
#	Stage name	Song	Identity	Result
1	Bride	"Never Enough" by Jenny Lind	undisclosed	WIN
2	Baby	"Should I Stay or Should I Go" by The Clash	Katsi Vaptsarov	OUT
3	Baba Yaga	"Бате Гойко" by Hipodil	undisclosed	RISK
4	Golden	"Kiss Kiss" by Tarkan	undisclosed	WIN
5	Predator	"Side to Side" by Ariana Grande feat. Nicki Minaj	undisclosed	RISK
6	Scarecrow	"Word Up!" by Gun	undisclosed	WIN
7	Macaron	"Hello" by Adele	undisclosed	WIN

- Guest Performance: "Hijo de la Luna" by Mecano performed by Antoaneta Dobreva "Neti" as "Rose"

=== Week 10 (14 November) ===
Performances on the tenth episode
#	Stage name	Song	Identity	Result
1	Golden	"Дано" by Bogdana Karadocheva	undisclosed	WIN
2	Macaron	"Fallin'" by Alicia Keys	undisclosed	RISK
3	Scarecrow	"Creep" by Radiohead	Peyo Filipov	OUT
4	Bride	"Euphoria" by Loreen	undisclosed	WIN
5	Predator	"Million Reasons" by Lady Gaga	undisclosed	RISK
6	Baba Yaga	"Poison" by Alice Cooper	undisclosed	WIN

- Guest Performance: "Son of a Preacher Man" by Dusty Springfield performed by Milena Markova "Matsa" as "Cocoon"

=== Week 11 (21 November) ===
Performances on the eleventh episode
#	Stage name	Song	Identity	Result
1	Predator	"Speechless" by Naomi Scott	undisclosed	RISK
2	Bride	"Set Fire to the Rain" by Adele	undisclosed	WIN
3	Golden	"Кукла" by Atlas	Kristian Kirilov	OUT
4	Macaron	"Жестокая любовь" by Philipp Kirkorov	undisclosed	WIN
5	Baba Yaga	"La Bamba" by Ritchie Valens	undisclosed	WIN

- Guest Performance: "Черната овца" by Ahat performed by Ruslan Maynov as "Peacock"
- Guest Performance: "Chandelier" by Sia performed by Petya Buyuklieva as "Butterfly"
- Krisko appears on stage as a detective - behind the mask of "Baby"

=== Week 12 (28 November) ===
Each contestant performed two songs.

Performances on the twelfth episode
#	Stage name	Song	Identity	Result
1	Baba Yaga	"Canción del Mariachi" by Antonio Banderas	undisclosed	SAFE
1	Baba Yaga	"Until It Sleeps" by Metallica	undisclosed	SAFE
2	Bride	"Bound to You" by Christina Aguilera	undisclosed	SAFE
2	Bride	"Песен моя, обич моя" by Yordanka Hristova	undisclosed	SAFE
3	Predator	"Притури са планината" by Stefka Sabotinova	undisclosed	SAFE
3	Predator	"Caruso" by Lara Fabian	undisclosed	SAFE
4	Macaron	"I Don't Want to Miss a Thing" by Aerosmith	Desi Slava	OUT
4	Macaron	"Hurt" by Christina Aguilera	Desi Slava	OUT

- Guest Performance: "Walking By Myself" by Gary Moore performed by Etien Levi as "Scotsman"

=== Week 13 (5 December) - Finale ===
Each contestant performed two songs, and performed a group song together, before being unmasked.

Performances on the thirteenth episode
#	Stage name	Song	Identity	Result
1	Predator	"Think" by Aretha Franklin	Christiana Louizu	THIRD
1	Predator	"One Moment in Time" by Whitney Houston	Christiana Louizu	THIRD
2	Baba Yaga	"We're Not Gonna Take It" by Twisted Sister	Borislav Zakhariev	WINNER
2	Baba Yaga	"'O sole mio" by Luciano Pavarotti	Borislav Zakhariev	WINNER
3	Bride	"Не казвай любе лека нощ"	Nevena Tsoneva	RUNNER-UP
3	Bride	"Camino" by Lili Ivanova	Nevena Tsoneva	RUNNER-UP

- Guest Performance: "Volare" & "Buleria" by Gipsy Kings performed by Vladi Aprilov as "Bull."
- Group Number (Finalists): "Маска на цветни петна"

== New Year's Concert (Season 2) ==
#	Contestant	Song	Mask
1	Poli Genova	"How We End Up"	Eyes
2	Stefan Ilchev	"Любовта"	Light
3	Georgi Nizamov	"Why Did You Go"	Brain
4	Tedi Katsarova	"Само аз и ти"	Clown
5	Kristian Kirilov	"Last Christmas" by Wham!	Golden
6	Esil Duran	"Искам само теб"	Angel
7	Milena Slavova	"Хвърчило"	Book
8	Boris Soltariyski	"Завинаги"	Snake
9	Christiana Louizu	"Царица на нощта"	Predator
10	Peyo Filipov	"In The Mood" by Glenn Miller	Scarecrow
11	Nevena Tsoneva	"Вечерница"	Bride
12	Katsi Vaptsarov	"Девойко, мари хубава"	Baby
13	Desi Slava	"Забрави за мен"	Macaron
14	Borislav Zahariev	"Se Bastasse Una Canzone" by Eros Ramazzotti	Baba Yaga

== Season 3 ==
Results
Stage name	Celebrity	Occupation	Episodes												
Stage name	Celebrity	Occupation	1	2	3	4	5	6	7	8	9	10	11	12	13
Miss	Victoria Georgieva	Singer	SAFE		WIN		WIN	WIN		WIN	WIN	WIN	WIN	SAFE	WINNER
Mushroom	Krisia	Singer	SAFE		WIN		RISK		WIN	RISK	WIN	WIN	WIN	SAFE	RUNNER-UP
Rhino	Miro	Singer	SAFE		WIN		RISK		RISK	WIN	WIN	RISK	WIN	SAFE	THIRD
Stone	Toto	Singer	SAFE	WIN		RISK		WIN		WIN	WIN	WIN	RISK	OUT	
Samurai	Vladimir Mihaylov	Singer/Actor	SAFE	WIN		WIN		WIN		RISK	RISK	RISK	OUT		
Pearl	Lora Karadzhova	Singer	SAFE	RISK		RISK		RISK		RISK	RISK	OUT			
Bat	Georgi Simeonov	Singer	SAFE		WIN		WIN		WIN	WIN	OUT				
Rabbit	Maria Ignatova	TV host/Actress	SAFE	WIN		WIN			WIN	OUT					
Bouquet	Reni	Singer	SAFE		RISK		WIN		OUT						
Raspberry	Lady B	Singer	SAFE	WIN		WIN		OUT							
Porcelain	Dara Ekimova	Singer	SAFE		RISK		OUT								
Glarus	Darin Angelov	Actor	SAFE	RISK		OUT									
Suitcase	Kalin Velyov	Musician	SAFE		OUT										
Circus	Bobi Vaklinov	Reporter/Rapper	SAFE	OUT											

The masked singer won their face-off and remained in the competition.
The masked singer lost their face-off and was in the bottom three, but was not eliminated.
The masked singer was safe from elimination.
The masked singer was eliminated from the competition and unmasked upon their elimination.
The masked singer did not perform.

=== Week 1 (11 September) ===
- Every contestant performed and was safe from elimination.

Performances on the first episode
#	Stage name	Song	Identity	Result
1	Raspberry	"It's Raining Men" by Weather Girls	undisclosed	SAFE
2	Circus	"Old Town Road" by Lil Nas X	undisclosed	SAFE
3	Pearl	"Crazy in Love" by Beyoncé feat. Jay-Z	undisclosed	SAFE
4	Glarus	"It's My Life" by Bon Jovi	undisclosed	SAFE
5	Mushroom	"Barbie Girl" by Aqua	undisclosed	SAFE
6	Samurai	"Just the Way You Are" by Bruno Mars	undisclosed	SAFE
7	Rabbit	"Mamma Mia" by ABBA	undisclosed	SAFE
8	Bat	"Shape of You" by Ed Sheeran	undisclosed	SAFE
9	Porcelain	"Someone You Loved" by Lewis Capaldi	undisclosed	SAFE
10	Suitcase	"I Feel Good" by James Brown	undisclosed	SAFE
11	Bouquet	"Sway" by The Pussycat Dolls	undisclosed	SAFE
12	Stone	"Zitti e buoni" by Måneskin	undisclosed	SAFE
13	Miss	"Midnight Sky" by Miley Cyrus	undisclosed	SAFE
14	Rhino	"Watermelon Sugar" by Harry Styles	undisclosed	SAFE

=== Week 2 (18 September) ===
Performances on the second episode
#	Stage name	Song	Identity	Result
1	Circus	"Ayy Macarena" by Tyga	Bobi Vaklinov	OUT
2	Samurai	"Rolling in the Deep" by Adele	undisclosed	WIN
3	Stone	"Pretty Fly (for a White Guy)" by The Offspring	undisclosed	WIN
4	Glarus	"Има ли цветя" by Lubo Kirov	undisclosed	RISK
5	Raspberry	"We Will Rock You" by Queen	undisclosed	WIN
6	Rabbit	"По-полека" by Stefan Valdobrev & Obichainite zapodozreni	undisclosed	WIN
7	Pearl	"Smells Like Teen Spirit" by Malia J	undisclosed	RISK

Guest Performance: "Фалшив герой" by Todor Kolev performed by Evgeni Budinov as "Snake"

=== Week 3 (25 September) ===
Performances on the third episode
#	Stage name	Song	Identity	Result
1	Bouquet	"I Love Rock 'n' Roll" by Joan Jett	undisclosed	RISK
2	Mushroom	"Kiss Kiss" by Tarkan	undisclosed	WIN
3	Porcelain	"The Winner Takes It All" by ABBA	undisclosed	RISK
4	Miss	"Purple Rain" by Prince	undisclosed	WIN
5	Rhino	"The Business" by Tiësto	undisclosed	WIN
6	Bat	"Hallelujah" by Alexandra Burke	undisclosed	WIN
7	Suitcase	"You Can Leave Your Hat On" by Joe Cocker	Kalin Velyov	OUT

Guest Performance: "Can You Feel the Love Tonight" by Elton John performed by Borislav Zahariev as "Golden"

=== Week 4 (2 October) ===
Performances on the fourth episode
#	Stage name	Song	Identity	Result
1	Rabbit	"Fame" by Irene Cara	undisclosed	WIN
2	Glarus	"Your Song" from Moulin Rouge	Darin Angelov	OUT
3	Stone	"How You Remind Me" by Nickelback	undisclosed	RISK
4	Raspberry	"Someone like You" by Adele	undisclosed	WIN
5	Pearl	"Tomorrow Never Dies" by Sheryl Crow	undisclosed	RISK
6	Samurai	"Would I Lie to You" by Charles & Eddie	undisclosed	WIN

Guest Performance: "Циганска сватба" by Toto H performed by Vanya Shtereva as "Baba Yaga"

=== Week 5 (9 October) ===
Performances on the fifth episode
#	Stage name	Song	Identity	Result
1	Rhino	"Everybody" by Backstreet Boys	undisclosed	RISK
2	Bouquet	"Horchat Hai Caliptus" by Ishtar	undisclosed	WIN
3	Miss	"Dance Monkey" by Tones and I	undisclosed	WIN
4	Mushroom	"I Have Nothing" by Whitney Houston	undisclosed	RISK
5	Porcelain	"Billie Jean" by Michael Jackson	Dara Ekimova	OUT
6	Bat	"Love Me Again" by John Newman	undisclosed	WIN

Guest Performance: "Синева" by Vasil Naydenov performed by Mihail Duyzev as "Baby"

=== Week 6 (16 October) ===
Performances on the sixth episode
#	Stage name	Song	Identity	Result
1	Samurai	"Valerie" by Amy Winehouse	undisclosed	WIN
2	Raspberry	"I'm So Excited" by The Pointer Sisters	Lady B	OUT
3	Pearl	"Electricity" by Dua Lipa	undisclosed	RISK
4	Stone	"I'll Be There for You" by The Rembrandts	undisclosed	WIN
5	Miss	"Bohemian Rhapsody" by Queen	undisclosed	WIN

Guest Performance: "Relight My Fire" by Take That performed by Dimitar Karnev as "Bull" Guest Performance: "Brand New Me" by Alicia Keys performed by Magi Dzhanavarova as "Bride"

=== Week 7 (23 October) ===
Performances on the seventh episode
#	Stage name	Song	Identity	Result
1	Bat	"Molitva" by Marija Šerifović	undisclosed	WIN
2	Bouquet	"Venus" by Bananarama	Reni	OUT
3	Mushroom	"Candyman" by Christina Aguilera	undisclosed	WIN
4	Rhino	"Occidentali's Karma" by Francesco Gabbani	undisclosed	RISK
5*	Rabbit	"Lambada" by Kaoma	undisclosed	WIN

Guest Performance: "I Was Made for Lovin' You" by Kiss performed by Ivaylo Zahariev as "Knight" Guest Performance: "Canción del Mariachi" by Antonio Banderas performed by Evgeni Minchev as "Star"

- The performance of the "Rabbit" is presented by the participant's home because it is under quarantine.

=== Week 8 (30 October) ===
Performances on the eighth episode
#	Stage name	Song	Identity	Result
1	Rabbit	"Един неразделен клас"/"Приятели"/"Запази последния танц" by Tonika SV	Maria Ignatova	OUT
2	Bat	"Wake Me Up" by Avicii	undisclosed	WIN
3	Rhino	"Human" by Rag'n'Bone Man	undisclosed	WIN
4	Pearl	"Lean On" by Major Lazer & DJ Snake	undisclosed	RISK
5	Samurai	"Seven Nation Army" by The White Stripes	undisclosed	RISK
6	Miss	"Don't Start Now" by Dua Lipa	undisclosed	WIN
7	Mushroom	"Don't Cha" by The Pussycat Dolls	undisclosed	RISK
8	Stone	"Galvanize" by The Chemical Brothers	undisclosed	WIN

Guest Performance: "Bella Ciao" by Manu Pilas performed by Maria Ilieva as "Scarecrow"

=== Week 9 (6 November) ===
Performances on the ninth episode
#	Stage name	Song	Identity	Result
1	Pearl	"Save Your Tears" by The Weeknd	undisclosed	RISK
2	Mushroom	"Ave Maria" by F.Schubert	undisclosed	WIN
3	Miss	"Единствени" by Slavi Trifonov & Sofi Marinova	undisclosed	WIN
4	Bat	"Angels" by Robbie Williams	Georgi Simeonov	OUT
5	Rhino	"Thunder" by Dara	undisclosed	WIN
6	Samurai	"Самурай" by Zhana Bergendorff	undisclosed	RISK
7	Stone	"American Woman" by Lenny Kravitz	undisclosed	WIN

Guest Performance: "Poison" by Alice Cooper performed by Ivaylo Tsvetkov "Noyzi" as "Scotsman"

=== Week 10 (13 November) ===
Performances on the tenth episode
#	Stage name	Song	Identity	Result
1	Stone	"Feeling Good" by Michael Bublé	undisclosed	WIN
2	Pearl	"It's a Man's Man's Man's World" by James Brown	Lora Karadzhova	OUT
3	Miss	"Paparazzi" by Lady Gaga	undisclosed	WIN
4*	Rhino	"Beggin'" by Måneskin	undisclosed	RISK
5	Mushroom	"I Put a Spell on You" by Annie Lennox	undisclosed	WIN
6	Samurai	"Can't Stop the Feeling" by Justin Timberlake	undisclosed	RISK

Guest Performance: "Afterglow" by Ed Sheeran performed by Katsi Vaptsarov as "Hat"

- The performance of the "Rhino" is shown on record.

=== Week 11 (20 November) ===
Performances on the eleventh episode
#	Stage name	Song	Identity	Result
1	Samurai	"Higher Power" by Coldplay	Vladimir Mihaylov	OUT
2	Rhino	"Chandelier" by Sia	undisclosed	WIN
3	Mushroom	"Super Bass" by Nicki Minaj	undisclosed	WIN
4	Stone	"Here Without You" by 3 Doors Down	undisclosed	RISK
5	Miss	"A Song for You" by Donny Hathaway	undisclosed	WIN

Guest Performance: "We Are The World" by USA for Africa performed by Divna as "Angel"

Guest Performance: "Yellow Submarine" by The Beatles performed by Bogdana Trifonova as "Macaron"

=== Week 12 (27 November) ===
- Each contestant performed two songs.

Performances on the twelfth episode
#	Stage name	Song	Identity	Result
1	Rhino	"Jalebi Baby" by Tesher & Jason Derulo	undisclosed	SAFE
1	Rhino	"Lekol Echad Yesh"/"Жива рана" by Slavi Trifonov	undisclosed	SAFE
2	Mushroom	"I Kissed A Girl" by Katy Perry	undisclosed	SAFE
2	Mushroom	"Zombie" by The Cranberries	undisclosed	SAFE
3	Stone	"I Wanna Be Your Slave" by Måneskin	Toto	OUT
3	Stone	"I Can't Dance" by Genesis	Toto	OUT
4	Miss	"Creep" by Radiohead	undisclosed	SAFE
4	Miss	"Къде беше ти" by Galena	undisclosed	SAFE

Guest Performance: "Ти дойде" by Lili Ivanova performed by Marian Bachev as "Eyes"

=== Week 13 (4 December) - Finale ===
Each contestant performed two songs, and performed a group song together, before being unmasked.

Performances on the thirteenth episode
#	Stage name	Song	Identity	Result
1	Mushroom	"Like a Virgin" by Madonna	Krisia	RUNNER-UP
1	Mushroom	"Ако утре ме губиш" by Preslava	Krisia	RUNNER-UP
2	Rhino	"Adventure of a Lifetime" by Coldplay	Miro	THIRD
2	Rhino	"Губя контрол, когато" by Miro	Miro	THIRD
3	Miss	"Crazy" by Gnarls Barkley	Victoria Georgieva	WINNER
3	Miss	"Лале ли си, зюмбюл ли си"	Victoria Georgieva	WINNER

Guest Performance: "Fly Me To The Moon" by Frank Sinatra performed by Bashar Rahal as "Owl"

Guest Performance: "We Are the Champions" by Queen performed by Desi Dobreva as "Princess" Group Number (Finalists): "Bad Romance" by Lady Gaga/"Rasputin" by Majestic & Boney M. Men in Black Performance: "I Want It That Way" by Backstreet Boys

== New Year's concert (Season 3) ==
#	Contestant	Song	Mask
1	Maria Ignatova	"По-полека" by Stefan Valdobrev & Obichainite zapodozreni	Rabbit
2	Darin Angelov	"Сбогом, моя любов" by Vasil Naydenov	Glarus
3	Dara Ekimova	"Война"	Porcelain
4	Miro	"Губя контрол, когато"	Rhino
5	Lady B	"Something's Got a Hold on Me" by Christina Aguilera	Raspberry
6	Toto	"Епидемо"	Stone
7	Reni	"Музика свири"	Bouquet
8	Bobi Vaklinov	"Mambo No. 5" by Lou Bega	Circus
9	Lora Karadzhova	"Ain't Nobody" by Chaka Khan	Pearl
10	Kalin Velyov	"Hit the Road Jack" by Shirley Horn	Suitcase
11	Krisia	"Let It Snow" by Dean Martin	Mushroom
12	Georgi Simeonov	"Забранена любов"	Bat
13	Vladimir Mihaylov	"Сякаш съм там"	Samurai
14	Victoria Georgieva	"The Worst"	Miss
