= The Masked Singer (Bulgarian TV series) season 2 =

The Masked Singer
- Season 2
- Starring: Azis; Aleksandra Raeva; Vladimir Penev
- Hosted by: Gerasim Georgiev - Gero; Vasil Vasilev - Zueka
- No. of contestants: 14
- Winner: Borislav Zahariev as "Baba Yaga"
- Runner-up: Nevena Tsoneva as "Bride"
- No. of episodes: 13 (+1 special)

Release
- Original network: Nova
- Original release: September 12 – December 5, 2020

Season chronology
- ← Previous; Season 1 Next → Season 3

The second season of the Bulgarian television series The Masked Singer premiered on Nova on 12 September 2020 and concluded on 5 December 2020.

== Hosts and panelists ==
Zueka returned as host, joined by season 1 panelist Gero. A new panel was announced, consisting of Azis, Aleksandra Raeva and Vladimir Penev. Throughout the season they were joined by various guest judges:

The Masked Singer Guest judges
Episode	Guest judge
1	Mihaela Marinova (replacing Raeva)
2	Viktor Kalev
3	Nikolay Sotirov
4	Julian Vergov
5	Martina Vachkova
6	Lyubomir Neykov
7	Stefania Koleva and Julian Vergov (replacing Penev)
8	Yana Marinova
9	Toncho Tokmakchiev
10	Dimiter Marinov
11	Krisko
12	Judy Halvadjian
13	

== Contestants ==
Results
Stage name	Celebrity	Occupation	Episodes												
Stage name	Celebrity	Occupation	1	2	3	4	5	6	7	8	9	10	11	12	13
Baba Yaga	Borislav Zakhariev	Actor	SAFE	WIN		WIN		WIN		WIN	RISK	WIN	WIN	SAFE	WINNER
Bride	Nevena Tsoneva	Singer	SAFE	WIN		RISK		RISK		WIN	WIN	WIN	WIN	SAFE	RUNNER-UP
Predator	Christiana Louizu	Singer	SAFE		WIN		WIN		RISK	RISK	RISK	RISK	RISK	SAFE	THIRD
Macaron	Desi Slava	Singer	SAFE		WIN		WIN		WIN	RISK	WIN	RISK	WIN	OUT	
Golden	Kristian Kirilov	Actor	SAFE	WIN		WIN		WIN		WIN	WIN	WIN	OUT		
Scarecrow	Peyo Filipov	Musician	SAFE	RISK		RISK		WIN		WIN	WIN	OUT			
Baby	Katsi Vaptsarov	TV host	SAFE		WIN		WIN		WIN	RISK	OUT				
Clown	Tedi Katsarova	Singer	SAFE		WIN		RISK		WIN	OUT					
Brain	Georgi Nizamov	Actor	SAFE		RISK		RISK		OUT						
Light	Stefan Ilchev	Singer	SAFE	RISK		WIN		OUT							
Book	Milena Slavova	Singer	SAFE		RISK		OUT								
Angel	Esil Duran	Singer	SAFE	WIN		OUT									
Snake	Boris Soltariĭski	Singer	SAFE		OUT										
Eyes	Poli Genova	Singer	SAFE	OUT											

The masked singer won their face-off and remained in the competition.
The masked singer lost their face-off and was in the bottom three, but was not eliminated.
The masked singer was safe from elimination.
The masked singer was eliminated from the competition and unmasked upon their elimination.
The masked singer did not perform.

== Episodes ==
=== Week 1 (12 September) ===
- Every contestant performed and was safe from elimination.

Performances on the first episode
#	Stage name	Song	Identity	Result
1	Bride	"My Number One" by Helena Paparizou	undisclosed	SAFE
2	Baba Yaga	"Sweet Dreams" by Marilyn Manson	undisclosed	SAFE
3	Brain	"Камион ме блъсна" by Todor Kolev	undisclosed	SAFE
4	Clown	"Bad Romance" by Lady Gaga	undisclosed	SAFE
5	Snake	"She's All I Ever Had" by Ricky Martin	undisclosed	SAFE
6	Golden	"I'm Too Sexy" by Right Said Fred	undisclosed	SAFE
7	Book	"It Must Have Been Love" by Roxette	undisclosed	SAFE
8	Eyes	"I've Been Thinking About You" by Londonbeat	undisclosed	SAFE
9	Baby	"Черни котараци" by Milenita	undisclosed	SAFE
10	Scarecrow	"In The End" by Linkin Park	undisclosed	SAFE
11	Angel	"Welcome to Burlesque" by Cher	undisclosed	SAFE
12	Light	"GoldenEye" by Tina Turner	undisclosed	SAFE
13	Predator	"This Is Me" by Keala Settle	undisclosed	SAFE
14	Macaron	"Hallelujah" by Alexandra Burke	undisclosed	SAFE

=== Week 2 (19 September) ===
Performances on the second episode
#	Stage name	Song	Identity	Result
1	Eyes	"Paranoid" by Black Sabbath	Poli Genova	OUT
2	Baba Yaga	"Cuban Pete" by Jim Carrey	undisclosed	WIN
3	Bride	"Lady Marmalade" by Christina Aguilera	undisclosed	WIN
4	Scarecrow	"It's My Life" by Dr. Alban	undisclosed	RISK
5	Light	"Daddy Cool" by Boney M.	undisclosed	RISK
6	Golden	"Mambo No. 5" by Lou Bega	undisclosed	WIN
7	Angel	"I Will Always Love You" by Whitney Houston	undisclosed	WIN

- Guest Performance: "What a Wonderful World" by Louis Armstrong performed by Nikolay Sotirov as "Knight"

=== Week 3 (26 September) ===
Performances on the third episode
#	Stage name	Song	Identity	Result
1	Snake	"Bubamara" by Goran Bregović	Boris Soltariĭski	OUT
2	Macaron	"Always Remember Us This Way" by Lady Gaga	undisclosed	WIN
3	Predator	"The Show Must Go On" by Queen	undisclosed	WIN
4	Brain	"Proud Mary" by Tina Turner	undisclosed	RISK
5	Book	"Hot Stuff" by Donna Summer	undisclosed	RISK
6	Baby	"Вселена" by 4 Magic	undisclosed	WIN
7	Clown	"I Kissed a Girl" by Katy Perry	undisclosed	WIN

- Guest Performance: "All About That Bass" by Meghan Trainor performed by Lazara Zlatareva "Kaka Lara" as "Chicken"

=== Week 4 (3 October) ===
Performances on the fourth episode
#	Stage name	Song	Identity	Result
1	Angel	"We Found Love" by Rihanna	Esil Duran	OUT
2	Baba Yaga	"Speed" by Billy Idol	undisclosed	WIN
3	Bride	"It's All Coming Back to Me Now" by Celine Dion	undisclosed	RISK
4	Light	"I Feel It Coming" by The Weeknd	undisclosed	WIN
5	Golden	"Най-щастливият ден" by Kontrol	undisclosed	WIN
6	Scarecrow	"I'm a Believer" by Smash Mouth	undisclosed	RISK

- Guest Performance: "Tears" by Clean Bandit performed by Yoana Dimitrova as "Bee"

=== Week 5 (10 October) ===
Performances on the fifth episode
#	Stage name	Song	Identity	Result
1	Brain	"Междучасие" by Vasil Naydenov	undisclosed	RISK
2	Baby	"Can't Help Falling in Love" by Elvis Presley	undisclosed	WIN
3	Clown	"Lost on You" by LP	undisclosed	RISK
4	Macaron	"Señorita" by Shawn Mendes & Camila Cabello	undisclosed	WIN
5	Predator	"Dance Monkey" by Tones and I	undisclosed	WIN
6	Book	"Nothing Compares 2 U" by Sinéad O'Connor	Milena Slavova	OUT

- Guest Performance: "Believer" by Imagine Dragons performed by Yonislav Yotov "Toto" as "Lion"

=== Week 6 (17 October) ===
Performances on the sixth episode
#	Stage name	Song	Identity	Result
1	Golden	"Livin' la Vida Loca" by Ricky Martin	undisclosed	WIN
2	Bride	"What a Feeling" by Irene Cara	undisclosed	RISK
3	Scarecrow	"Wake Me Up" by Avicii	undisclosed	WIN
4	Baba Yaga	"Wicked Game" by Chris Isaak	undisclosed	WIN
5	Light	"La Luna" by Belinda Carlisle	Stefan Ilchev	OUT

- Guest Performance: "In the Air Tonight" by Phil Collins performed by Slavin Slavchev as "Raven"
- Guest Performance: "Заклинание" by Petar Chernev performed by Dragomir Draganov as "Mummer"

=== Week 7 (24 October) ===
Performances on the seventh episode
#	Stage name	Song	Identity	Result
1	Macaron	"Истина" by Milena Slavova	undisclosed	WIN
2	Predator	"Hero" by Mariah Carey	undisclosed	RISK
3	Brain	"Brother Louie" by Modern Talking	Georgi Nizamov	OUT
4	Baby	"Yes Sir, I Can Boogie" by Baccara	undisclosed	WIN
5	Clown	"Blame It on the Boogie" by The Jacksons	undisclosed	WIN

- Guest Performance: "Миллион алых роз" by Alla Pugacheva performed by Anton Stefanov as "Hat"
- Guest Performance: "One Night Only" by Jennifer Hudson performed by Dara Ekimova as "Princess"

=== Week 8 (31 October) ===
Performances on the eighth episode
#	Stage name	Song	Identity	Result
1	Scarecrow	"Du hast" by Rammstein	undisclosed	WIN
2	Macaron	"I'm Into You" by Jennifer Lopez	undisclosed	RISK
3	Golden	"Bad Boys" by Inner Circle	undisclosed	WIN
4	Predator	"Billie Jean" by Michael Jackson	undisclosed	RISK
5	Bride	"Оставаме" by Margarita Hranova	undisclosed	WIN
6	Clown	"I Follow Rivers" by Lykke Li	Tedi Katsarova	OUT
7	Baba Yaga	"Summer Wine" by Natalia Avelon	undisclosed	WIN
8	Baby	"Bad Guy" by Billie Eilish	undisclosed	RISK

- Guest Performance: "Cotton Eye Joe" by Rednex performed by Tsvetelin Atanasov as "Star"

=== Week 9 (7 November) ===
Performances on the ninth episode
#	Stage name	Song	Identity	Result
1	Bride	"Never Enough" by Jenny Lind	undisclosed	WIN
2	Baby	"Should I Stay or Should I Go" by The Clash	Katsi Vaptsarov	OUT
3	Baba Yaga	"Бате Гойко" by Hipodil	undisclosed	RISK
4	Golden	"Kiss Kiss" by Tarkan	undisclosed	WIN
5	Predator	"Side to Side" by Ariana Grande feat. Nicki Minaj	undisclosed	RISK
6	Scarecrow	"Word Up!" by Gun	undisclosed	WIN
7	Macaron	"Hello" by Adele	undisclosed	WIN

- Guest Performance: "Hijo de la Luna" by Mecano performed by Antoaneta Dobreva "Neti" as "Rose"

=== Week 10 (14 November) ===
Performances on the tenth episode
#	Stage name	Song	Identity	Result
1	Golden	"Дано" by Bogdana Karadocheva	undisclosed	WIN
2	Macaron	"Fallin'" by Alicia Keys	undisclosed	RISK
3	Scarecrow	"Creep" by Radiohead	Peyo Filipov	OUT
4	Bride	"Euphoria" by Loreen	undisclosed	WIN
5	Predator	"Million Reasons" by Lady Gaga	undisclosed	RISK
6	Baba Yaga	"Poison" by Alice Cooper	undisclosed	WIN

- Guest Performance: "Son of a Preacher Man" by Dusty Springfield performed by Milena Markova "Matsa" as "Cocoon"

=== Week 11 (21 November) ===
Performances on the eleventh episode
#	Stage name	Song	Identity	Result
1	Predator	"Speechless" by Naomi Scott	undisclosed	RISK
2	Bride	"Set Fire to the Rain" by Adele	undisclosed	WIN
3	Golden	"Кукла" by Atlas	Kristian Kirilov	OUT
4	Macaron	"Жестокая любовь" by Philipp Kirkorov	undisclosed	WIN
5	Baba Yaga	"La Bamba" by Ritchie Valens	undisclosed	WIN

- Guest Performance: "Черната овца" by Ahat performed by Ruslan Maynov as "Peacock"
- Guest Performance: "Chandelier" by Sia performed by Petya Buyuklieva as "Butterfly"
- Krisko appears on stage as a detective - behind the mask of "Baby"

=== Week 12 (28 November) ===
Each contestant performed two songs.

Performances on the twelfth episode
#	Stage name	Song	Identity	Result
1	Baba Yaga	"Canción del Mariachi" by Antonio Banderas	undisclosed	SAFE
1	Baba Yaga	"Until It Sleeps" by Metallica	undisclosed	SAFE
2	Bride	"Bound to You" by Christina Aguilera	undisclosed	SAFE
2	Bride	"Песен моя, обич моя" by Yordanka Hristova	undisclosed	SAFE
3	Predator	"Притури са планината" by Stefka Sabotinova	undisclosed	SAFE
3	Predator	"Caruso" by Lara Fabian	undisclosed	SAFE
4	Macaron	"I Don't Want to Miss a Thing" by Aerosmith	Desi Slava	OUT
4	Macaron	"Hurt" by Christina Aguilera	Desi Slava	OUT

- Guest Performance: "Walking By Myself" by Gary Moore performed by Etien Levi as "Scotsman"

=== Week 13 (5 December) - Finale ===
Each contestant performed two songs, and performed a group song together, before being unmasked.

Performances on the thirteenth episode
#	Stage name	Song	Identity	Result
1	Predator	"Think" by Aretha Franklin	Christiana Louizu	THIRD
1	Predator	"One Moment in Time" by Whitney Houston	Christiana Louizu	THIRD
2	Baba Yaga	"We're Not Gonna Take It" by Twisted Sister	Borislav Zakhariev	WINNER
2	Baba Yaga	"'O sole mio" by Luciano Pavarotti	Borislav Zakhariev	WINNER
3	Bride	"Не казвай любе лека нощ"	Nevena Tsoneva	RUNNER-UP
3	Bride	"Camino" by Lili Ivanova	Nevena Tsoneva	RUNNER-UP

- Guest Performance: "Volare" & "Buleria" by Gipsy Kings performed by Vladi Aprilov as "Bull"
- Group Number (Finalists): "Маска на цветни петна"

== New Year's Concert ==
#	Contestant	Song	Mask
1	Poli Genova	"How We End Up"	Eyes
2	Stefan Ilchev	"Любовта"	Light
3	Georgi Nizamov	"Why Did You Go"	Brain
4	Tedi Katsarova	"Само аз и ти"	Clown
5	Kristian Kirilov	"Last Christmas" by Wham!	Golden
6	Esil Duran	"Искам само теб"	Angel
7	Milena Slavova	"Хвърчило"	Book
8	Boris Soltariyski	"Завинаги"	Snake
9	Christiana Louizu	"Царица на нощта"	Predator
10	Peyo Filipov	"In The Mood" by Glenn Miller	Scarecrow
11	Nevena Tsoneva	"Вечерница"	Bride
12	Katsi Vaptsarov	"Девойко, мари хубава"	Baby
13	Desi Slava	"Забрави за мен"	Macaron
14	Borislav Zahariev	"Se Bastasse Una Canzone" by Eros Ramazzotti	Baba Yaga
