= The Masked Singer (Bulgarian TV series) season 1 =

The Masked Singer
- Season 1
- Starring: Niki Kunchev; Gala; Gerasim Georgiev - Gero; Maria Ilieva
- Hosted by: Dimitar Rachkov; Vasil Vasilev - Zueka
- No. of contestants: 16
- Winner: Mihaela Marinova as "Raven"
- Runner-up: Zhana Bergendorff as "Rose"
- No. of episodes: 13 (+1 special)

Release
- Original network: Nova
- Original release: September 14 – December 7, 2019

Season chronology
- Next → Season 2

The first season of the Bulgarian television series The Masked Singer premiered on Nova on 14 September 2019 and concluded on 7 December 2019.

== Hosts and panelists ==
The show was hosted by Dimitar Rachkov and Vasil Vasilev - Zueka who have hosted the bulgarian versions of "Kato dve kapki voda" and the comedy show "Gospodari Na Efira" together. The panel consisted of TV host Niki Kunchev, talk show host Gala, actor and comedian Gerasim Georgiev - Gero and singer Maria Ilieva.

Guest panelists include Julian Vergov in episode 7, Argirovi Brothers in episode 11 (when Maria Ilieva was absent) and Lubo Kirov for the New Year concert.

== Contestants ==
Results
Stage name	Celebrity	Occupation	Episodes												
Stage name	Celebrity	Occupation	1	2	3	4	5	6	7	8	9	10	11	12	13
Raven	Mihaela Marinova	Singer		WIN		RISK		WIN		WIN	RISK	RISK	WIN	SAFE	WINNER
Rose	Zhana Bergendorff	Singer	WIN		RISK		WIN		WIN		WIN	WIN	RISK	SAFE	RUNNER-UP
Bee	Magi Dzhanavarova	Singer		WIN		WIN		WIN		WIN	WIN	WIN	WIN	SAFE	THIRD
Chicken	Divna	Singer	WIN		WIN		RISK		WIN		WIN	WIN	RISK	OUT	
Princess	Alisia	Singer	RISK		WIN		WIN		WIN		RISK	WIN	WIN	OUT	
Mummer	Nencho Balabanov	Actor	WIN		WIN		RISK		RISK		WIN	RISK	OUT		
Hat	Katsi Vaptsarov	TV host		RISK		WIN		RISK		RISK	RISK	OUT			
Owl	Valentin Mihov	Footballer		WIN		WIN		WIN		WIN	OUT				
Lion	Albena Mihova	Actress	RISK		RISK		WIN			OUT					
Butterfly	Preyah	Singer		RISK		WIN		RISK	OUT						
Scotsman	Julian Konstantinov	TV host/Singer		WIN		RISK		OUT							
Bull	Filip Avramov	Actor	RISK		WIN		OUT								
Star	Encho Danailov	TV host/Actor		RISK		OUT									
Knight	Dimo Aleksiev	Actor	WIN		OUT										
Cocoon	Dzhuliana Gani	Model		OUT											
Peacock	Ivan Zvezdev	Chef	OUT												

The masked singer won their face-off and remained in the competition.
The masked singer lost their face-off and was in the bottom three, but was not eliminated.
The masked singer was safe from elimination.
The masked singer was eliminated from the competition and unmasked upon their elimination.
The masked singer did not perform.

== Episodes ==
=== Week 1 (14 September) ===
Performances on the first episode
#	Stage name	Song	Identity	Result
1	Bull	"Du Hast" by Rammstein	undisclosed	RISK
2	Knight	"My Way" by Frank Sinatra	undisclosed	WIN
3	Rose	"Who Wants To Live Forever" by Queen	undisclosed	WIN
4	Princess	"Loquita" by Claydee & Eleni Foureira	undisclosed	RISK
5	Mummer	"Can You Feel the Love Tonight" by Elton John	undisclosed	WIN
6	Peacock	"Volare" by Domenico Modugno	Ivan Zvezdev	OUT
7	Chicken	"Gasolina" by Daddy Yankee	undisclosed	WIN
8	Lion	"Pink" by Aerosmith	undisclosed	RISK

=== Week 2 (21 September) ===
Performances on the second episode
#	Stage name	Song	Identity	Result
1	Hat	"No Escape" by Dubioza koletiv	undisclosed	RISK
2	Owl	"Аз и ти" by D2	undisclosed	WIN
3	Bee	"Whenever, Wherever" by Shakira	undisclosed	WIN
4	Cocoon	"Justify My Love" by Madonna	Dzhuliana Gani	OUT
5	Star	"Dragostea Din Tei" by O-Zone	undisclosed	RISK
6	Scotsman	"Old Man River" by The Righteous Brothers	undisclosed	WIN
7	Raven	"Love of My Life" by Queen	undisclosed	WIN
8	Butterfly	"Smells Like Teen Spirit" by Nirvana	undisclosed	RISK

=== Week 3 (28 September) ===
Performances on the third episode
#	Stage name	Song	Identity	Result
1	Knight	''Боби'' by Wickeda	Dimo Aleksiev	OUT
2	Bull	"Hallelujah" by Leonard Cohen	undisclosed	WIN
3	Mummer	"Bamboléo" by Gipsy Kings	undisclosed	WIN
4	Lion	"Wrecking Ball" by Miley Cyrus	undisclosed	RISK
5	Princess	"Summertime Sadness" by Lana Del Rey	undisclosed	WIN
6	Rose	"You Shook Me All Night Long" by AC/DC	undisclosed	RISK
7	Chicken	"Stayin' Alive" by Bee Gees	undisclosed	WIN

=== Week 4 (5 October) ===
Performances on the fourth episode
#	Stage name	Song	Identity	Result
1	Star	"Ai Se Eu Te Pego" by Michel Teló	Encho Danailov	OUT
2	Owl	"Let It Be" by The Beatles	undisclosed	WIN
3	Butterfly	"Money" by Cardi B	undisclosed	WIN
4	Bee	"Hello" by Adele	undisclosed	WIN
5	Raven	"Proud Mary" by Tina Turner	undisclosed	RISK
6	Hat	"Disko Partizani" by Shantel	undisclosed	WIN
7	Scotsman	"Soli" by Adriano Celentano	undisclosed	RISK

=== Week 5 (12 October) ===
Performances on the fifth episode
#	Stage name	Song	Identity	Result
1	Bull	"Let's Twist Again" by Chubby Checker	Filip Avramov	OUT
2	Lion	"Shallow" by Lady Gaga & Bradley Cooper	undisclosed	WIN
3	Mummer	"Send Me An Angel" by Scorpions	undisclosed	RISK
4	Rose	"The Winner Takes It All" by ABBA	undisclosed	WIN
5	Princess	"Вярвам в теб" by Deep Zone Project	undisclosed	WIN
6	Chicken	"At Last" by Etta James	undisclosed	RISK

=== Week 6 (19 October) ===
Performances on the sixth episode
#	Stage name	Song	Identity	Result
1	Hat	"Perfect" by Ed Sheeran	undisclosed	RISK
2	Raven	"Feeling Good" by Michael Bublé	undisclosed	WIN
3	Scotsman	"Love Me Tender" by Elvis Presley	Julian Konstantinov	OUT
4	Bee	"Wannabe" by Spice Girls	undisclosed	WIN
5	Butterfly	"Wicked Game" by Chris Isaak	undisclosed	RISK
6	Owl	"Хубава си моя горо"	undisclosed	WIN

=== Week 7 (26 October) ===
Performances on the seventh episode
#	Stage name	Song	Identity	Result
1	Mummer	"Black or White" by Michael Jackson	undisclosed	RISK
2	Princess	"Hit the Road Jack" by Ray Charles	undisclosed	WIN
3	Butterfly	"Ain't Nobody" by Chaka Khan	Preyah	OUT
4	Chicken	"Gangnam Style" by PSY	undisclosed	WIN
5	Rose	"Излел е Дельо хайдутин"	undisclosed	WIN

=== Week 8 (2 November) ===
Performances on the eighth episode
#	Stage name	Song	Identity	Result
1	Lion	"Call Me When You're Sober" by Evanescence	Albena Mihova	OUT
2	Owl	"Фалшив герой" by Todor Kolev	undisclosed	WIN
3	Raven	"Thunderstruck" by AC/DC	undisclosed	WIN
4	Hat	"Despacito" by Luis Fonsi	undisclosed	RISK
5	Bee	"God Is A Woman" by Ariana Grande	undisclosed	WIN

=== Week 9 (9 November) ===
Performances on the ninth episode
#	Stage name	Song	Identity	Result
1	Chicken	"Don't Stop Me Now" by Queen	undisclosed	WIN
2	Raven	"Make You Feel My Love" by Adele	undisclosed	RISK
3	Mummer	"Море сокол пие"	undisclosed	WIN
4	Hat	"The Sound of Silence" by Pentatonix	undisclosed	RISK
5	Rose	"Valerie" by Amy Winehouse	undisclosed	WIN
6	Owl	"Мурка" by Vladimir Vysotsky	Valentin Mihov	OUT
7	Bee	"Lose Yourself" by Eminem	undisclosed	WIN
8	Princess	"Unfaithful" by Rihanna	undisclosed	RISK

=== Week 10 (16 November) ===
Performances on the tenth episode
#	Stage name	Song	Identity	Result
1	Bee	"Bang Bang" by Jessie J, Ariana Grande & Nicki Minaj	undisclosed	WIN
2	Mummer	"American Woman" by Lenny Kravitz	undisclosed	RISK
3	Hat	"Шапка ти свалям" by Krisko	Katsi Vaptsarov	OUT
4	Princess	"Истина" by Milena Slavova	undisclosed	WIN
5	Chicken	"Вода" by Elitsa & Stoyan	undisclosed	WIN
6	Rose	"I Will Always Love You" by Whitney Houston	undisclosed	WIN
7	Raven	"Thriller" by Michael Jackson	undisclosed	RISK

=== Week 11 (23 November) ===
Performances on the eleventh episode
#	Stage name	Song	Identity	Result
1	Mummer	"L'Italiano" by Toto Cutugno	Nencho Balabanov	OUT
2	Raven	"Always Remember Us This Way" by Lady Gaga	undisclosed	WIN
3	Princess	"Dirty Diana" by Michael Jackson	undisclosed	WIN
4	Chicken	"Ain't No Other Man" by Christina Aguilera	undisclosed	RISK
5	Rose	"Mother's Daughter" by Miley Cyrus	undisclosed	RISK
6	Bee	"All The Man That I Need" by Whitney Houston	undisclosed	WIN

=== Week 12 (30 November) ===
Performances on the twelfth episode
#	Stage name	Song	Identity	Result
1	Chicken	"Eye of the Tiger" by Survivor	Divna	OUT
2	Princess	"Mercy" by Duffy	Alisia	OUT
3	Rose	"I Put a Spell on You" by Annie Lennox	undisclosed	SAFE
4	Bee	"Think" by Aretha Franklin	undisclosed	SAFE
5	Raven	"Лале ли си, зюмбюл ли си"	undisclosed	SAFE

=== Week 13 (7 December) - Finale ===
Each contestant performed two songs, and performed a group song together, before being unmasked.

- Group Number (Non-Finalists - Albena Mihova, Alisia, Divna, Encho Danailov, Nencho Balabanov, Preyah and Valentin Mihov): "We're Not Gonna Take It" by Twisted Sister

Performances on the thirteenth episode
#	Stage name	Song	Identity	Result
1	Raven	"Mamma Knows Best" by Jessie J	Mihaela Marinova	WINNER
1	Raven	"Never Enough" by Loren Allred	Mihaela Marinova	WINNER
2	Bee	"Високо" by FSB	Magi Dzhanavarova	THIRD
2	Bee	"All I Want for Christmas Is You" by Mariah Carey	Magi Dzhanavarova	THIRD
3	Rose	"Hallelujah" by Alexandra Burke	Zhana Bergendorff	RUNNER-UP
3	Rose	"We Are the Champions" by Queen	Zhana Bergendorff	RUNNER-UP

- Guest Performance: "Rockstar" by Nickelback performed by Philip Avramov as "Tiborg"
- Group Number (Finalists): "One Moment in Time" by Whitney Houston
- Men in Black Performance: "I'm Too Sexy" by Right Said Fred

== New Year's Concert (Mask Switch) ==
#	Stage name	Song	Identity
1	Butterfly	"So This Is Christmas"	Zhana Bergendorff
2	Bee	"Fighter" by Christina Aguilera	Divna
3	Star	"Speed" by Billy Idol	Nencho Balabanov
4	Princess	"Bohemian Rhapsody" by Queen	Magi Dzhanavarova
5	Rose	"Piece Of My Heart" by Janis Joplin	Roberta
6	Knight	"А дали е така" by Vasil Naydenov	Dimo Aleksiev
7	Lion	"Last Christmas" by Wham!	Preyah
8	Cocoon	"Sorry" by Justin Bieber	Stefan Ilchev
9	Chicken	"O Holy Night" by Mariah Carey	Mihaela Marinova
10	Peacock	"Phantom I Saif Ali Khan" by Afghan Jalebi	Katsi Vaptsarov
11	Hat	"Светът е за двама" by Orlin Goranov	Magarditch Halvadjian
