= The Masked Singer (Bulgarian TV series) season 3 =

The Masked Singer
- Season 3
- Starring: Aleksandra Raeva; Azis; Martina Vachkova; Vladimir Penev
- Hosted by: Gerasim Georgiev - Gero; Krasimir Radkov
- No. of contestants: 14
- Winner: Victoria Georgieva as "Miss"
- Runner-up: Krisia as "Mushroom"
- No. of episodes: 13 (+1 special)

Release
- Original network: Nova
- Original release: September 11 – December 4, 2021

Season chronology
- ← Previous; Season 2

The third season of the Bulgarian television series The Masked Singer premiered on Nova on 11 September 2021 and concluded on 4 December 2021.

== Hosts and panelists ==
Gero returned as host, joined by new host Krasimir Radkov. Aleksandra Raeva, Azis and Vladimir Penev all returned as panelists with Martina Vachkova (who was guest panelist in the previous season) joining them.

In the fifth episode TV-host Gala (who was panelist in the first season) replaced Azis.

== Contestants ==
Results
Stage name	Celebrity	Occupation	Episodes												
Stage name	Celebrity	Occupation	1	2	3	4	5	6	7	8	9	10	11	12	13
Miss	Victoria Georgieva	Singer	SAFE		WIN		WIN	WIN		WIN	WIN	WIN	WIN	SAFE	WINNER
Mushroom	Krisia	Singer	SAFE		WIN		RISK		WIN	RISK	WIN	WIN	WIN	SAFE	RUNNER-UP
Rhino	Miro	Singer	SAFE		WIN		RISK		RISK	WIN	WIN	RISK	WIN	SAFE	THIRD
Stone	Toto	Singer	SAFE	WIN		RISK		WIN		WIN	WIN	WIN	RISK	OUT	
Samurai	Vladimir Mihaylov	Singer/Actor	SAFE	WIN		WIN		WIN		RISK	RISK	RISK	OUT		
Pearl	Lora Karadzhova	Singer	SAFE	RISK		RISK		RISK		RISK	RISK	OUT			
Bat	Georgi Simeonov	Singer	SAFE		WIN		WIN		WIN	WIN	OUT				
Rabbit	Maria Ignatova	TV host/Actress	SAFE	WIN		WIN			WIN	OUT					
Bouquet	Reni	Singer	SAFE		RISK		WIN		OUT						
Raspberry	Lady B	Singer	SAFE	WIN		WIN		OUT							
Porcelain	Dara Ekimova	Singer	SAFE		RISK		OUT								
Glarus	Darin Angelov	Actor	SAFE	RISK		OUT									
Suitcase	Kalin Velyov	Musician	SAFE		OUT										
Circus	Bobi Vaklinov	Reporter/Rapper	SAFE	OUT											

The masked singer won their face-off and remained in the competition.
The masked singer lost their face-off and was in the bottom three, but was not eliminated.
The masked singer was safe from elimination.
The masked singer was eliminated from the competition and unmasked upon their elimination.
The masked singer did not perform.

== Episodes ==
=== Week 1 (11 September) ===
- Every contestant performed and was safe from elimination.

Performances on the first episode
#	Stage name	Song	Identity	Result
1	Raspberry	"It's Raining Men" by Weather Girls	undisclosed	SAFE
2	Circus	"Old Town Road" by Lil Nas X	undisclosed	SAFE
3	Pearl	"Crazy in Love" by Beyoncé feat. Jay-Z	undisclosed	SAFE
4	Glarus	"It's My Life" by Bon Jovi	undisclosed	SAFE
5	Mushroom	"Barbie Girl" by Aqua	undisclosed	SAFE
6	Samurai	"Just the Way You Are" by Bruno Mars	undisclosed	SAFE
7	Rabbit	"Mamma Mia" by ABBA	undisclosed	SAFE
8	Bat	"Shape of You" by Ed Sheeran	undisclosed	SAFE
9	Porcelain	"Someone You Loved" by Lewis Capaldi	undisclosed	SAFE
10	Suitcase	"I Feel Good" by James Brown	undisclosed	SAFE
11	Bouquet	"Sway" by The Pussycat Dolls	undisclosed	SAFE
12	Stone	"Zitti e buoni" by Måneskin	undisclosed	SAFE
13	Miss	"Midnight Sky" by Miley Cyrus	undisclosed	SAFE
14	Rhino	"Watermelon Sugar" by Harry Styles	undisclosed	SAFE

=== Week 2 (18 September) ===
Performances on the second episode
#	Stage name	Song	Identity	Result
1	Circus	"Ayy Macarena" by Tyga	Bobi Vaklinov	OUT
2	Samurai	"Rolling in the Deep" by Adele	undisclosed	WIN
3	Stone	"Pretty Fly (for a White Guy)" by The Offspring	undisclosed	WIN
4	Glarus	"Има ли цветя" by Lubo Kirov	undisclosed	RISK
5	Raspberry	"We Will Rock You" by Queen	undisclosed	WIN
6	Rabbit	"По-полека" by Stefan Valdobrev & Obichainite zapodozreni	undisclosed	WIN
7	Pearl	"Smells Like Teen Spirit" by Malia J	undisclosed	RISK

Guest Performance: "Фалшив герой" by Todor Kolev performed by Evgeni Budinov as "Snake"

=== Week 3 (25 September) ===
Performances on the third episode
#	Stage name	Song	Identity	Result
1	Bouquet	"I Love Rock 'n' Roll" by Joan Jett	undisclosed	RISK
2	Mushroom	"Kiss Kiss" by Tarkan	undisclosed	WIN
3	Porcelain	"The Winner Takes It All" by ABBA	undisclosed	RISK
4	Miss	"Purple Rain" by Prince	undisclosed	WIN
5	Rhino	"The Business" by Tiësto	undisclosed	WIN
6	Bat	"Hallelujah" by Alexandra Burke	undisclosed	WIN
7	Suitcase	"You Can Leave Your Hat On" by Joe Cocker	Kalin Velyov	OUT

Guest Performance: "Can You Feel the Love Tonight" by Elton John performed by Borislav Zahariev as "Golden"

=== Week 4 (2 October) ===
Performances on the fourth episode
#	Stage name	Song	Identity	Result
1	Rabbit	"Fame" by Irene Cara	undisclosed	WIN
2	Glarus	"Your Song" from Moulin Rouge	Darin Angelov	OUT
3	Stone	"How You Remind Me" by Nickelback	undisclosed	RISK
4	Raspberry	"Someone like You" by Adele	undisclosed	WIN
5	Pearl	"Tomorrow Never Dies" by Sheryl Crow	undisclosed	RISK
6	Samurai	"Would I Lie to You" by Charles & Eddie	undisclosed	WIN

Guest Performance: "Циганска сватба" by Toto H performed by Vanya Shtereva as "Baba Yaga"

=== Week 5 (9 October) ===
Performances on the fifth episode
#	Stage name	Song	Identity	Result
1	Rhino	"Everybody" by Backstreet Boys	undisclosed	RISK
2	Bouquet	"Horchat Hai Caliptus" by Ishtar	undisclosed	WIN
3	Miss	"Dance Monkey" by Tones and I	undisclosed	WIN
4	Mushroom	"I Have Nothing" by Whitney Houston	undisclosed	RISK
5	Porcelain	"Billie Jean" by Michael Jackson	Dara Ekimova	OUT
6	Bat	"Love Me Again" by John Newman	undisclosed	WIN

Guest Performance: "Синева" by Vasil Naydenov performed by Mihail Duyzev as "Baby"

=== Week 6 (16 October) ===
Performances on the sixth episode
#	Stage name	Song	Identity	Result
1	Samurai	"Valerie" by Amy Winehouse	undisclosed	WIN
2	Raspberry	"I'm So Excited" by The Pointer Sisters	Lady B	OUT
3	Pearl	"Electricity" by Dua Lipa	undisclosed	RISK
4	Stone	"I'll Be There for You" by The Rembrandts	undisclosed	WIN
5	Miss	"Bohemian Rhapsody" by Queen	undisclosed	WIN

Guest Performance: "Relight My Fire" by Take That performed by Dimitar Karnev as "Bull"

Guest Performance: "Brand New Me" by Alicia Keys performed by Magi Dzhanavarova as "Bride"

=== Week 7 (23 October) ===
Performances on the seventh episode
#	Stage name	Song	Identity	Result
1	Bat	"Molitva" by Marija Šerifović	undisclosed	WIN
2	Bouquet	"Venus" by Bananarama	Reni	OUT
3	Mushroom	"Candyman" by Christina Aguilera	undisclosed	WIN
4	Rhino	"Occidentali's Karma" by Francesco Gabbani	undisclosed	RISK
5*	Rabbit	"Lambada" by Kaoma	undisclosed	WIN

Guest Performance: "I Was Made for Lovin' You" by Kiss performed by Ivaylo Zahariev as "Knight"

Guest Performance: "Canción del Mariachi" by Antonio Banderas performed by Evgeni Minchev as "Star"

- The performance of the "Rabbit" is presented by the participant's home because it is under quarantine.

=== Week 8 (30 October) ===
Performances on the eighth episode
#	Stage name	Song	Identity	Result
1	Rabbit	"Един неразделен клас"/"Приятели"/"Запази последния танц" by Tonika SV	Maria Ignatova	OUT
2	Bat	"Wake Me Up" by Avicii	undisclosed	WIN
3	Rhino	"Human" by Rag'n'Bone Man	undisclosed	WIN
4	Pearl	"Lean On" by Major Lazer & DJ Snake	undisclosed	RISK
5	Samurai	"Seven Nation Army" by The White Stripes	undisclosed	RISK
6	Miss	"Don't Start Now" by Dua Lipa	undisclosed	WIN
7	Mushroom	"Don't Cha" by The Pussycat Dolls	undisclosed	RISK
8	Stone	"Galvanize" by The Chemical Brothers	undisclosed	WIN

Guest Performance: "Bella Ciao" by Manu Pilas performed by Maria Ilieva as "Scarecrow"

=== Week 9 (6 November) ===
Performances on the ninth episode
#	Stage name	Song	Identity	Result
1	Pearl	"Save Your Tears" by The Weeknd	undisclosed	RISK
2	Mushroom	"Ave Maria" by F.Schubert	undisclosed	WIN
3	Miss	"Единствени" by Slavi Trifonov & Sofi Marinova	undisclosed	WIN
4	Bat	"Angels" by Robbie Williams	Georgi Simeonov	OUT
5	Rhino	"Thunder" by Dara	undisclosed	WIN
6	Samurai	"Самурай" by Zhana Bergendorff	undisclosed	RISK
7	Stone	"American Woman" by Lenny Kravitz	undisclosed	WIN

Guest Performance: "Poison" by Alice Cooper performed by Ivaylo Tsvetkov "Noyzi" as "Scotsman"

=== Week 10 (13 November) ===
Performances on the tenth episode
#	Stage name	Song	Identity	Result
1	Stone	"Feeling Good" by Michael Bublé	undisclosed	WIN
2	Pearl	"It's a Man's Man's Man's World" by James Brown	Lora Karadzhova	OUT
3	Miss	"Paparazzi" by Lady Gaga	undisclosed	WIN
4*	Rhino	"Beggin'" by Måneskin	undisclosed	RISK
5	Mushroom	"I Put a Spell on You" by Annie Lennox	undisclosed	WIN
6	Samurai	"Can't Stop the Feeling" by Justin Timberlake	undisclosed	RISK

Guest Performance: "Afterglow" by Ed Sheeran performed by Katsi Vaptsarov as "Hat"

- The performance of the "Rhino" is shown on record.

=== Week 11 (20 November) ===
Performances on the eleventh episode
#	Stage name	Song	Identity	Result
1	Samurai	"Higher Power" by Coldplay	Vladimir Mihaylov	OUT
2	Rhino	"Chandelier" by Sia	undisclosed	WIN
3	Mushroom	"Super Bass" by Nicki Minaj	undisclosed	WIN
4	Stone	"Here Without You" by 3 Doors Down	undisclosed	RISK
5	Miss	"A Song for You" by Donny Hathaway	undisclosed	WIN

Guest Performance: "We Are The World" by USA for Africa performed by Divna as "Angel"

Guest Performance: "Yellow Submarine" by The Beatles performed by Bogdana Trifonova as "Macaron"

=== Week 12 (27 November) ===
- Each contestant performed two songs.

Performances on the twelfth episode
#	Stage name	Song	Identity	Result
1	Rhino	"Jalebi Baby" by Tesher & Jason Derulo	undisclosed	SAFE
1	Rhino	"Lekol Echad Yesh"/"Жива рана" by Slavi Trifonov	undisclosed	SAFE
2	Mushroom	"I Kissed A Girl" by Katy Perry	undisclosed	SAFE
2	Mushroom	"Zombie" by The Cranberries	undisclosed	SAFE
3	Stone	"I Wanna Be Your Slave" by Måneskin	Toto	OUT
3	Stone	"I Can't Dance" by Genesis	Toto	OUT
4	Miss	"Creep" by Radiohead	undisclosed	SAFE
4	Miss	"Къде беше ти" by Galena	undisclosed	SAFE

Guest Performance: "Ти дойде" by Lili Ivanova performed by Marian Bachev as "Eyes"

=== Week 13 (4 December) - Finale ===
Each contestant performed two songs, and performed a group song together, before being unmasked.

Performances on the thirteenth episode
#	Stage name	Song	Identity	Result
1	Mushroom	"Like a Virgin" by Madonna	Krisia	RUNNER-UP
1	Mushroom	"Ако утре ме губиш" by Preslava	Krisia	RUNNER-UP
2	Rhino	"Adventure of a Lifetime" by Coldplay	Miro	THIRD
2	Rhino	"Губя контрол, когато" by Miro	Miro	THIRD
3	Miss	"Crazy" by Gnarls Barkley	Victoria Georgieva	WINNER
3	Miss	"Лале ли си, зюмбюл ли си"	Victoria Georgieva	WINNER

Guest Performance: "Fly Me To The Moon" by Frank Sinatra performed by Bashar Rahal as "Owl"

Guest Performance: "We Are the Champions" by Queen performed by Desi Dobreva as "Princess"

Group Number (Finalists): "Bad Romance" by Lady Gaga/"Rasputin" by Majestic & Boney M.

Men in Black Performance: "I Want It That Way" by Backstreet Boys

== New Year's concert ==
#	Contestant	Song	Mask
1	Maria Ignatova	"По-полека" by Stefan Valdobrev & Obichainite zapodozreni	Rabbit
2	Darin Angelov	"Сбогом, моя любов" by Vasil Naydenov	Glarus
3	Dara Ekimova	"Война"	Porcelain
4	Miro	"Губя контрол, когато"	Rhino
5	Lady B	"Something's Got a Hold on Me" by Christina Aguilera	Raspberry
6	Toto	"Епидемо"	Stone
7	Reni	"Музика свири"	Bouquet
8	Bobi Vaklinov	"Mambo No. 5" by Lou Bega	Circus
9	Lora Karadzhova	"Ain't Nobody" by Chaka Khan	Pearl
10	Kalin Velyov	"Hit the Road Jack" by Shirley Horn	Suitcase
11	Krisia	"Let It Snow" by Dean Martin	Mushroom
12	Georgi Simeonov	"Забранена любов"	Bat
13	Vladimir Mihaylov	"Сякаш съм там"	Samurai
14	Victoria Georgieva	"The Worst"	Miss
