= Vaptsarov =

Vaptsarov (Bulgarian: Вапцаров) is a Bulgarian masculine surname, its feminine counterpart is Vaptsarova. The surname may refer to

- Katsi Vaptsarov (born 1963), Bulgarian television host and film director
- Nikola Vaptsarov (1909–1942), Bulgarian poet, communist and revolutionary
  - Nikola Vaptsarov Naval Academy in Varna, Bulgaria
  - Vaptsarov Peak in Antarctica
