= Christiana Loizu =

- Born: Christiana Hadjiordanous; 19 January 1990 (age 35); Larnaca, Cyprus
- Genres: Pop, opera, soft rock
- Occupation: Singer
- Instrument: Vocals
- Years active: 2005–present
- Labels: Virginia Records

Christiana Hadjiiordanous (Greek: Χριστιάνα Χατζηιορδάνους, Bulgarian: Християна Хаджийорданус; born 19 January 1990) is a Cypriot-born singer and the winner of the 4th season of The X Factor Bulgaria. Since her 2015 participation at the talent show, she became known as Christiana Loizu (Greek: Χριστιάνα Λοΐζου, Bulgarian: Християна Лоизу).

== Career ==
=== Early career ===
Christiana Loizu was born and raised in Larnaca, Cyprus. She began singing at the age of 12 at Silva Makamian's local private singing School. During her childhood, she competed at local and national competitions in Cyprus and Bulgaria, where she won several awards.

In 2005, Loizu participated at a music contest for the first time in Veliko Tarnovo and received the first prize. In 2007, she moved to Bulgaria, where she obtained her bachelor's degree in Opera Singing and her master's degree in Vocal Coaching from the National Academy of Music "Prof. Pancho Vladigerov" in Sofia.

In 2010, she won the Get on Stage talent show in Cyprus, where she earned a scholarship for a foundation course at the SLP College of Performing Arts in Leeds, UK.

In 2014, Loizu teamed up with Maria Moskofian and auditioned to represent Cyprus at the 2015 Eurovision Song Contest with the song "Sailing Ships, Pirates and Dragons", however, it was not selected.

=== 2015–2016: X Factor Bulgaria ===
Loizu's participation at Bulgaria's X Factor in 2015 led her to the finals of the competition. Her most memorable performances at the talent show was Lara Fabian's "Je t'aime" (winning song of the competition) and "Con te partirò", which she sang with BTR's lead singer Atanas Penev at the final.

As the winner of the talent show, she signed a recording contract with one of the major labels in Bulgaria, Virginia Records. In the same year, she released her debut single "Phoenix" in English. Her second single "Edno v Edno" (transl. as "One in One") is written in collaboration with the Swedish hit makers Olof Lindskog, Hayley Aitken and Jai Waetford.

=== 2015–2016: X Factor Bulgaria performances and songs ===
Episode	Theme	Song	Result
First audition	Free selection	"Je t'aime"	Through to 6 chair challenge
6 chair challenge	Group performance	"The Power of Love"	Through to Judge's houses
Judges' houses	Free selection	"Without You"	Through to live shows
Live show 1	Number one's	"Without You"	Safe
Live show 2	Halloween	"The Phantom of the Opera"	Safe
Live show 3	First love	"I Surrender"	Safe
Live show 4	Bulgarian hits	"Повей ветре"	Safe
Live show 5	Movie Soundtracks	"Jai Ho! (You Are My Destiny)"	Safe
Live show 6	Divas and Heroes	"Emotions"	Safe
Live show 7	Disco hits	"One Way Ticket"	Safe
Live show 8	International hits	"Dinata Dinata"	Safe
Christmas show	Christmas edition	"Adagio"	No eliminations
Live show 9	Love is everything	"I Will Always Love You"	Safe
Live show 9	Love is everything	"I'll Be There" (with Steven Achikor)	Safe
Live show 10	Tears and laughter	"Sway"	Safe
Live show 10	Tears and laughter	"Memory"	Safe
Semi-final	An "old" and a "new" song	"Bleeding Love"	Safe
Semi-final	An "old" and a "new" song	"Хубава си моя горо"	Safe
Final	One solo and one duet song	"Je t'aime"	Winner
Final	One solo and one duet song	"Con te partirò" (with Atanas Penev)	Winner
Final	Songs from series	"Осъдени души"	Winner

=== 2016–present: After The X Factor ===
After winning The X Factor and in 2018, she began live performances all over Bulgaria. In 2016, Loizu starred in the leading role of Maria-Magdalena and toured Bulgaria with the concert version of the renowned rock-opera by Andrew Lloyd Webber – "Jesus Christ Superstar" (courtesy of the Plovdiv National Opera) from April 2016 to September 2017. In November 2017 she auditioned to represent Cyprus at the annual Eurovision Song Contest with the song "Fuego". The committee chose Eleni Foureira to represent the country at the competition.

In 2018, she was selected by the jury of the Musical Theatre "Stefan Makedonski" in Sofia to play the leading role of Christine Dae from the "Phantom of the Opera" as well as Hava from "Fiddler on the Roof" in 2019.

In 2020, she participated in Season 2 of the Bulgarian TV show "The Masked Singer" as The Predator, where she finished third. In 2021 she took the role of Daisy Buchanan in a Bulgarian musical inspired by The Great Gatsby at the National Musical Theatre "Stefan Makedonski" in Sofia https://musictheatre.bg/event/9.

== Discography & singles ==
Loizu's career as a recording artist began after her victory at The X Factor in 2016. Since then she has numerous hits. In 2021 she released an English version of her single "Tsaritsa na noshta" named "Queen of the Night".

Title	Year	Album
"Phoenix"	2016	Non-album single
"Edno v edno"	2017	Non-album single
"Tsaritsa na noshta"	2021	Non-album single
"Queen of the night"	2021	Non-album single
