= Ana-Maria Yanakieva =

Bulgarian singer (born 1998)

- Born: Ana-Maria Yanakieva; August 5, 1998 (age 28); Levski, Bulgaria
- Genres: R&B, pop, soul
- Occupation: Singer
- Years active: 2010–2014
- Label: Virginia Records

Ana-Maria Yanakieva (Bulgarian: Ана-Мария Янакиева, born 5 August 1998) is a Bulgarian singer from the music label Virginia Records, the official representative of Sony Music Entertainment for Bulgaria. She is also a scholar of Dimitar Berbatov Foundation. Ana-Maria is a finalist from Season 2 of X Factor Bulgaria, which took place in 2013.

== Biography ==
Ana-Maria was born in Levski, a small town in central Northern Bulgaria. Her mother Ralitza and her father Alexander are economists. She grew up and finished her primary education in Varna, the largest city and seaside resort on the Bulgarian Black Sea Coast. In 2012, she and her family moved to the capital Sofia. Ana-Maria started singing at the age of 6. Since then, she has participated in numerous musical contests in Bulgaria and abroad, and has won many of them. Her vocal coach is Adelina Koleva, a well-recognized name among Bulgarian music professionals. Since 2008, Ana-Maria is a scholar of Dimitar Berbatov Foundation, a charitable organization established by one of the best Bulgarian football players, Dimitar Berbatov, to support talented children. Ana-Maria's first major TV appearance was at the age of 11 on bTV's Bulgaria's Got Talent in 2010, but unfortunately she didn't reach the final stage, despite her amazing performance of the song "Fighter" by Christina Aguilera.

Her second and so far most successful appearance on TV was in Season 2 of X Factor Bulgaria, which took place in 2013. Although the rules of the show state that participants should be at least 16 years old, Ana-Maria was admitted by the executive producers to join the contest at the age of 15. After a series of astonishing live performances, she reached the final along with Zhana Bergendorff (winner) and Atanas Kolev (runner-up). She finished on 3rd place.

The X Factor performances and results
Episode	Theme	Song	Result
First audition	Free choice	"Halo"	Through to bootcamp
Bootcamp – stage 1	Group performance	""	Through to stage 2
Bootcamp – stage 2	Solo performance	""	Through to judges' houses
Judges' houses	Free choice	"One Moment in Time"	Through to live shows
Live show 1	Heroes	"Hero"	Safe
Live show 2	Bulgarian hits	"Мой стих"	Safe
Live show 3	Dance and R&B hits	"We Found Love"	Safe
Live show 4	Number-ones	"I Want To Know What Love Is"	Safe
Live show 5	Halloween	"Bring Me To Life"	Safe
Live show 6	Concert optional	"Starships"	Safe
Live show 7	British hits	"My Kind of Love"	Safe
Live show 8	Love songs	"Heart Attack & Made in the USA"	Bottom two (7th)
Live show 8	Final showdown	"Hurt"	Bottom two (7th)
Live show 9	Movie Soundtracks	"Something's Got a Hold on Me"	Safe
Live show 10	Love is everything	"Because of You"	Safe
Live show 10	Love is everything	"When You Believe" (with Zhana Bergendorff)	Safe
Semi-final	One English and one Bulgarian song	"Beautiful"	Safe
Semi-final	One English and one Bulgarian song	"На инат"	Safe
Final	One solo and one duet song	"Halo"	Third place (3rd)
Final	One solo and one duet song	"One Sweet Day" (with Bogomil Bonev)	Third place (3rd)

== Discography ==
List of singles as main artist
Title	Year	Peak chart positions						Album
Title	Year	BUL	US	CAN	IRE	NZ	UK	Album
Теб си пожелах (featuring Bogomil Bonev)	2014	4	—	—	—	—	—	—N/a
"—" denotes a recording that did not chart or was not released in that territory.
