= Diana Express =

Diana Express Диана Експрес
- Origin: Yambol, Bulgaria
- Genres: Rock
- Years active: 1974–1984; (2002–present)
- Labels: Balkanton
- Past members: Mitko Shterev; Vasil Naidenov; George Stanchev; Iliya Angelov

Diana Express (Bulgarian: Диана Експрес) is a Bulgarian rock band formed by Mitko Shterev in 1974 in Yambol.

Between 1974 and 1984, he discovers and creates Diana Express with young artists, whom later became stars: Vasil Naydenov, George Stanchev, Iliya Angelov

For a short time in the Diana Express transfers Chocho Vladovski, Yuksel Ahmedov from Fonoekspres. Some of the most popular songs are Sineva with Vasil Naidenov, Soul with George Stanchev, Blues For Two by Ilia Angelov.

In 1998, released a CD with the most popular of Diana Express, a new dance arrangement, as most of the songs are performed by young singer Gaul (Bulgarian: Галия).

Lately, the band teamed with English hard rock singer John Lawton for their latest album, "The Power Of Mind" (2012).

== Albums ==
- Диана Експрес 1/1974
- Диана експрес 2/1976
- Диана експрес 3/1980
- Молитва за дъжд/1981
- Диана експрес 4/1983
- Златна ябълка/1983
- Диана Експрес 5/1984
- Най-доброто от "Диана Експрес"/1995
- Dance Remixes/1998
- Осъдени Души/1998
- Ябълката На Греха/2002
- Златна Колекция/2005
- Текстове
- Златна колекция-30 години 2005
- Утре
- Душа
- Влюбено сърце
- Молитва за дъжд
- Северина
- Блус за двама
- Наследство
- Балада за Пловдив
- Признание
- Изгубена любов
- Минавам на червена светлина
- Всяка песен е любов
- Есен
- Златна ябълка
- Нежно постоянство
- Какво не ти достига
- Синева
- Диана и ловецът
- Хоровод
- Родопчанка
