= Nevena Tsoneva =

Bulgarian singer (born 1986)

- Born: Невена Цонева; 17 August 1986 (age 40)
- Origin: Sevlievo, Bulgaria
- Genres: Pop, R&B, Ethno
- Years active: 2007–present
- Label: Seventeen LTD.
- Website: http://seventeenproduction.com

Nevena Tsoneva (Bulgarian: Невена Цонева) (born 17 August 1986, in Sevlievo) is a Bulgarian singer who won the first season of the Bulgarian television series Music Idol in 2007.

== Biography ==
=== Early career ===
Born Nevena Tsvetanova Tsoneva, she began accompanying her dad to bar and restaurant performances at age six, and soon became a regular on the mic. After winning several awards Nevena recorded her first album at age 13, with the help of her ambitious father.

She conquered "Hit-1" with Christina Aguilera's song "The Voice Within". Two years later she won another contest, "Бургас и Морето" ("Burgas and the Sea"), performing the song "Мое Море" ("My Sea")- music by Mitko Shterev, lyrics: Lozan Takev. Nevena then recorded a pop-folk album, supported by her dad again. He wrote a song for the young star, called "Молитва за Теб" ("A Prayer for You"), which they often performed together.

=== Personal life and education ===
Prior to her musical career, She took Secondary Specialized Education – Organizer of Medium and Small Business, Economics, English, Bulgarian language & Literature, Mathematics, IT, Fine Art at Vasil Levski General Secondary School at her native Sevlievo in 2002–2005, she also took Marketing at St. Cyril and St. Methodius University of Veliko Turnovo in 2005 – 2006 and got her B.A (Bachelor of Arts) with honors at the prestigious International University College – University of Portsmouth Program, Sofia specializing Foundation degree – Business Administration in 2010 – 2011.

Other interests includes photography, drawing and travelling.

=== Music Idol ===
As a youngster, Nevena admired the singer Gloria and therefore auditioned for the first season of the Bulgarian TV show Music idol, where Gloria was one of the judges on the panel. At the first audition, Nevena performed "The Voice Within", "Даньова мама", Silvia Katzarova's "Топъл дъжд" and "Циганска е душата" a song by Gloria. She then made it to the finals, along with 11 other contestants. She gained an immediate advantage over the others after performing her first song, "Мой Стих" by Neli Rangelova. After a tough music battle, Nevena made it to the last round with competitor Teodor Koychinov. In the end, she won 64% of the votes, thus becoming Bulgaria's first Music Idol.

==== Song performances on Music Idol ====
Week # (Date)	Song	Original Artist	Theme	Result
Top 11 (3/26)	"Необясними неща"	Neli Rangelova	choice of song dating back to the contestant's year of birth	Safe
Top 10 (4/2)	"It's Raining Men"	The Weather Girls	Everlasting hits	Safe
Top 9 (4/9)	"Плачещо сърце"	Sofi Marinova	pop-folk performance	Top 2
Top 8 (4/16)	"My Heart Will Go On"	Celine Dion	Movie soundtrack performance: Titanic	Top 3
Top 7 (4/23)	"Крепост"	Gloria	song originally performed by a Music Idol judge	Safe
Top 6 (4/30)	"Буря" "Лудо младо"	Ustata –	duet performance with a singer: Ustata duet performance with a finalist: Preslava Peycheva	Safe
Top 5 (5/7)	"Hit the Road Jack" "Прошепнати мечти"	Ray Charles; Kamelia Todorova	English language performance Bulgarian language performance	Safe
Top 4 (5/14)	"Lane moje" "Gyöngyhajú lány"	Željko Joksimović; Omega	performance in a foreign language: Serbian performance in a foreign language: Hungarian	Btm 3
Top 3 (5/21)	"Objection" "Невено Моме"	Shakira –	performance with a ballet performance with a folk choir	Top 2
Top 2 (5/28)	"Даньова мама" "Една българска роза" "Habanera"	Bulgarian traditional folk song Pasha Hristova; From the opera Carmen	performance with a choir song about Bulgaria classical music	Top 2
Final (6/7)	"I Will Always Love You" "The Show Must Go On" "The Voice Within"	Dolly Parton (covered by Whitney Houston); Queen; Christina Aguilera	arranged for brass band viewer's choice contestant's choice	Winner
Post-win (6/7)	"Излел е Дельо хайдутин"	Bulgarian folk song	Bagpipe accompaniment	Finale

=== Post-Music Idol ===
Nevena signed a record deal with Virginia Records (representative of Universal Music Group for Bulgaria), which was the prize as a winner of the Music Idol contest. Her first duet with Slavi Trifonov, a song called "Жестока" ("Cruel"), came out some weeks later and became a hit. Her first single "За тебе песен нямам" ("I Have no Song for You"), a mix of modern pop and R&B, was released on 28 September 2007. The single debuted on Slavi's show and its video came out a month later. Nevena's first solo album appeared on 16 November 2007 and contained eleven songs, including an English-language version of "За тебе песен нямам". Music producer and A&R of the album was Miro Gechev and many of the album's lyrics were written by Rushi Vidinliev.

=== The Voice of Bulgaria ===
Seven years after winning the Music Idol Nevena auditions in the third season of Glasat na Bulgaria where she performed the song of Ishtar "Horchat hai Caliptus". She kept going on the show teamed with Miro. She won vocal duel and continued to live concerts.

== Discography ==
=== Albums ===
- Без страх (Bez strah, "No Fear") (2007)

=== Singles ===
- Жестока – featuring Slavi Trifonov & Ku-Ku Band (Cruel) (2007)
- За тебе песен нямам (For You Have no Song) (2007)
- Не изчезвай (Do not Disappear) (2007)
- Всеки път обиквам те – featuring Teodor Kojchinov (Every Time They Take to) (2008)
- Името ми – featuring Skiller & Ya-Ya (My Name) (2008)
- Zoom (Bad Boys vs. Super Girls) – featuring Marius Moga and NiVo (2009)
- Бяла зима (White Winter) (2010)
- Слагам край – Miro ft. Krisko & Nevena (Put an End) (2011)
- Налей, налей – Miro ft. Krisko & Nevena (Pour, Pour) (2011)
- Flying with the Wind – the song in the Pixar's animated film – "Brave" (2012)
- All over the Earth – the song in the Pixar's animated film – "Brave" (2012)
- Десет нощи (Ten Nights) (2013)
- Самодива (Fairy) (2013)
- Повей, ветре (Blow, Wind) (2013)
- Всичко, което искам – featuring Miro (All I Want) (2014)
- Когато най-силно ще боли – featuring Milenium X (When Most Would Hurt) (2015)
- Без имена – featuring Svetozar Hristov (Without Names) (2015)
- Нарича се живот – (It's Called Life) (2015)
- Двама – (Two) (2015)

== Awards ==
- 1999 – Winner in the "Become a Star" – Gabrovo, Bulgaria
- 2002 – First place in the international festival "Golden Harlequin" – Stara Zagora, Bulgaria
- 2004 – Winner for March in the "Hit minus one" of Television
- 2006 – Grand Prize in the "Burgas and the Sea", "Young Artist"
- 2006 – Grand Jury Prize in the "Burgas and the Sea" with the song "My Sea" (music and arrangement – Mitko Shterev, text – Lausanne Takev)
- 2007 – Winner of the first edition of the music format "Music Idol"
- 2008 – Award "Miss Golden stag" at the International Festival "Golden stag" – Brasov, Romania
- 2008 – Award "BG debut" of the Annual Music Awards "BG Radio"
- 2008 – Award "BG album" Annual Music Awards "BG Radio"
- 2008 – Prize "Best Debut" from Annual Television Music Awards "MM"
- 2008 – Award "BG album" Annual Television Music Awards "MM"
- 2008 – Award "BG pop music debut in 2007 'Annual Music Awards Television" Fan "
- 2008 – Award "BG Pop Album of 2007" Annual Television Music Awards "Fan"
- 2008 – Award "BG pop hit in 2007" Annual Television Music Awards "Fan"
- 2008 – Award of viewers Annual Television Music Awards "Fan"
- 2009 – Award "BG artist" Annual Music Awards "BG Radio"

== Special performances ==
- 2000 – Participant in the "Golden Mustang" – Varna, Bulgaria
- 2007 – Two concerts for the Bulgarian community in London, England
- 2007 – special guest – artist in the national tour of Slavi Trifonov and Ku-Ku Band – "We continue"
- 2008 – participation in "Eurovision Bulgaria" with the song "Beat It" (music-Gechev Miro and Carla Rahal; text – Vanya Shtereva; arrangement – Miro Gechev)
- 2008 – Guests at the evening show-rated TV Pro TV – "Happy hour", Romania
- 2008 – Concert for the Bulgarian community in Amsterdam, Netherlands
- 2009 – Special guest performer in the national tour of Slavi Trifonov and Ku-Ku Band – "No mercy"
- 2010 – Special guest performer in the show program "People of Fame"
- 2010 – Concert for the Bulgarian community in Nicosia, Cyprus
- 2010 – Special guest in "Slavi's people" show
- 2010 – Nevena founded her own music company – "Seventeen”
- 2011 – Special guest at the national tour "Summer with FAN TV"
- 2012 – Performs the songs "Flying with the Wind" and "All over the Earth" in the Pixar's animated film – "Brave"
- 2012 – Special guest-performer at the annual edition of the Vienna Fashion Awards 2012. Along with her performance of "Дельо Хайдутин" and "Даньова мама" young Bulgarian designer Lida Marinkova presented models of glass and acrylic

External

Year	Song	Chart positions	Album
Year	Song	BNT40	Album
2007	"Жестока" ft. Слави Трифонов & Ku-Ku Band	1	Без страх
2007	"За тебе песен нямам"	35	Без Страх
2007	"Не изчезвай"	6	Participant in choice on Bulgarian Song for Eurovision 2008 – semi-final and final
2008	"Всеки път обиквам те" ft. Теодор Койчинов	1	Без Страх
2008	"Името ми" (release: December 2008)	7	TBR
2009	"Zoom (Bad Boys vs. Super Girls)" ft. Marius Moga and NiVo	3	TBR
2010	"Бяла зима"(White winter)	TBR	TBR
