= Ahat =

Bulgarian rock band

- Ahat during a tour in 2007

Background information
- Origin: Sofia, Bulgaria
- Genres: Hard rock Heavy metal
- Years active: 1986 - 1991; 1998 - present
- Labels: Balkanton; Unison; Harbour Island Records
- Members: Zvezdomir Keremedchiev; Antoan Hadad; Denis Rizov; Antoni Georgiev; Yuri Kocev
- Past members: Bojidar Glavev; Ivailo Petrov
- Website: http://www.axat.net/

Ahat, also known as AXAT (Bulgarian: Ахат [aˈxat], "agate"), is a Bulgarian rock band.

== History ==
The band was founded in 1986 in Sofia by students from the National Academy of Music and the University of Chemical Technology and Metallurgy. Their first live performance was on December 22, 1986.

In 1989, the band went to North Korea with the Bulgarian delegation to the 13th World Festival of Youth and Students, which brought them criticism for being too close to the Communist regime. The same year, Ahat released their first album, Pohodut (Походът, The March). It is regarded as their most successful album. The most popular songs from it are "The Black Sheep", "Land Of Blindmen", "The Tree", "Fiery Souls", "The March". They also received their first music award and had a successful tour with Shturcite.

In 1990, they appeared on the compilation "21st Youth Pop Song Contest" album with the song "Deviz" (Девиз, Motto).

In 1994, Ahat released their second album Izpod ruinite (Изпод руините, From Underneath the Ruins). The album is a compilation of the band's hits, a couple of songs recorded for compilations, and 5 English-language songs recorded in 1991. Notable songs from this album are "Monologue" and the English version of "The Tree".

After a period of inactivity, Ahat had a notable return as the opening band for the first Deep Purple concert in Bulgaria in 1998. The following year, the band released their first live album, Sedem godini sled (Седем години след, 7 Years Later).

On May 19, 2004 the band released their third album, Made in USA. According to the publishers, the album is the biggest investment made by a Bulgarian musical producer.

Golden Rock Tour 2004 is the band's second live album recorded during their impressive national tour in 2004 and released in 2007. In 2009, they released a single called "Tam" (Там, There).

For their 30th anniversary in 2017, Ahat embarked on a nationwide tour with guest appearances by Joe Lynn Turner.

== Members ==
=== Current members ===
- Zvezdomir Keremedchiev – vocals
- Antoan Hadad – guitars
- Denis Rizov – bass guitars
- Antoni Georgiev – keyboards
- Yuri Kocev – drums

=== Former members ===
- Bojidar Glavev – guitar
- Ivailo Petrov – bass guitar

== Discography ==
- Pohodut (1989)
- Izpod ruinite (1994)
- Sedem godini sled... (live) (1999)
- Made in USA (2004)
- Golden Rock Tour 2004 (live) (2007)
- 1986-2013 (2015) (compilation of non-album singles and compilation tracks)
