= Bogdana Karadocheva =

Bogdana Karadocheva Богдана Карадочева
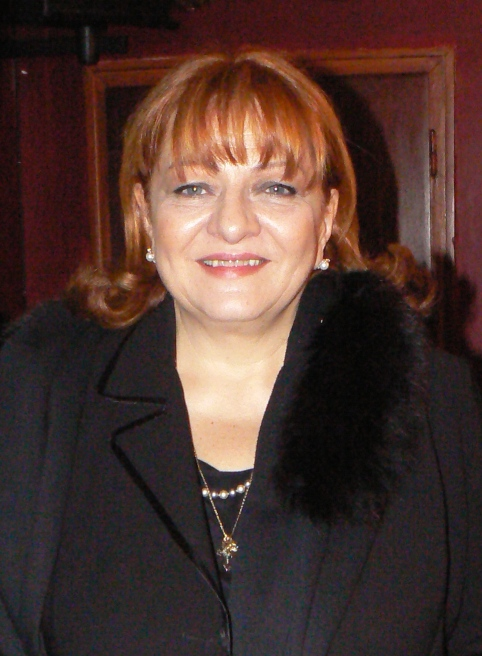

Background information
- Born: Bogdana Ivanova Karadocheva-Dimitrova (Богдана Иванова Карадочева-Димитрова); July 19, 1949 (age 77); Sofia, Bulgaria
- Genres: Pop
- Occupation: Singer
- Years active: 1965-present
- Label: Stefkos Music

Bogdana Karadocheva (Bulgarian: Богдана Карадочева; born July 19, 1949) is a Bulgarian estrade singer.

Karadocheva has been active in the musical sphere since the age of 14 and was encouraged by her mother to turn to opera singing, but she expressed a preference for estrade music.

She received a prize at the "Golden Orphey" (Bulgarian: Златния Орфей) festival in 1969. Karadocheva is married to composer Stefan Dimitrov. Some of her most notable songs include "Дано", "Остаряваме бавно", "Иване, Иване", "Помниш ли ти" and "Нова година". Karadocheva was a recipient of "the most Bulgarian singer" award for 1998, being honoured by the Association for Bulgarian Spirituality (Bulgarian: Сдружение за българска духовност).
