= Ivan Zvezdev =

Bulgarian cuisine TV showman (born 1975)

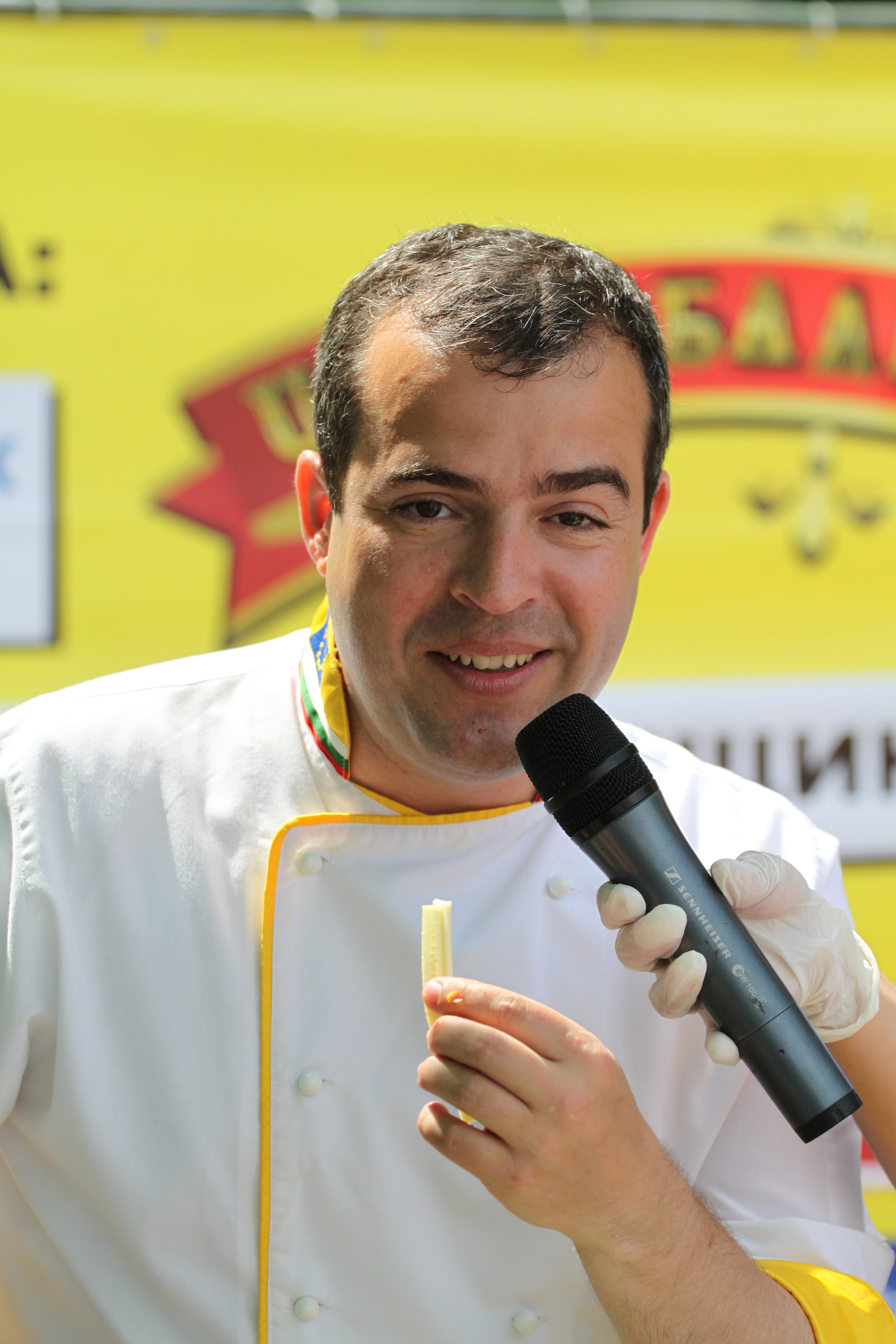
Ivan Zvezdev in 2011

Ivan Zvezdev (Bulgarian: Иван Звездев; born 12 August 1975) is one of the top Bulgarian cuisine TV showmen.

== Personal Life and Career ==
Born in Pavlikeni, he has one older brother, Aleksandar, as well as a sister, Boryana. With the help of bTV, his cuisine show "Bon Apeti" is well known in Bulgaria. From mid-2006 it is also part of the television GTV.

He is married to Yuliana and has three kids – two sons, Dimitar (or Mitko for short) and Ivan, and a daughter, Daniela (Dani). His daughter Daniela gave birth in January 2023.
