= Zhana Bergendorff =

Bulgarian singer and songwriter

Zhana Bergendorff Жана Бергендорф
- Born: Zhana Vladimirova Brankova; 20 October 1985 (age 40); Sofia, Bulgaria
- Genres: Rock; soul; pop; hip hop; dance
- Occupation: Singer
- Instrument: Vocals
- Years active: 2003–present
- Labels: Symphonix International; Universal Music Austria

Zhana Bergendorff (Bulgarian: Жана Бергендорф; born Zhana Vladimirova Brankova, Bulgarian: Жана Владимирова Бранкова, on 20 October 1985) is a Bulgarian singer and songwriter. She is known for winning the second series of Bulgarian X Factor in 2013.

== Biography ==
=== Early life ===
Zhana was born in Sofia, Bulgaria under the name Zhana Vladimirova Brankova, adopting the father and family name of her husband. She started singing at the age of 7. Her mother (a paratrooper) played the piano, and her maternal grandparents (both practicing jurists) played the violin. When she was 18 years old she moved to sing in South Korea. She lived there until 2010 and later moved to Denmark, her husband's country of origin. In Denmark she entered X Factor Denmark.

=== 2013: X Factor Bulgaria ===
Zhana participated in X Factor Bulgaria 2013. In all the weeks of the show, she was never threatened by elimination. She reached the finals with Ana-Maria Yanakieva and Atanas Kolev. Ana-Maria gained 3rd place, Zhana won the public vote by 69,9% winning the 2013 X factor title.

The X Factor performances and results
Episode	Theme	Song	Result
First audition	Free choice	"Price Tag"	Through to bootcamp
Bootcamp – stage 1	Group performance	""	Through to stage 2
Bootcamp – stage 2	Solo performance	""	Through to judges' houses
Judges' houses	Free choice	"Истина"	Through to live shows
Live show 1	Heroes	"Girl on Fire"	Safe
Live show 2	Bulgarian hits	"Ти ужасно закъсня"	Safe
Live show 3	Dance and R&B hits	"Hot n Cold"	Safe
Live show 4	Number-ones	"Rolling in the Deep"	Safe
Live show 5	Halloween	"Zombie"	Safe
Live show 6	Concert optional	"One Night Only"	Safe
Live show 7	British hits	"Someone like You"	Safe
Live show 8	Love songs	"My Heart Will Go On"	Safe
Live show 9	Movie Soundtracks	"A Little Party Never Killed Nobody (All We Got)"	Safe
Live show 10	Love is everything	"Impossible"	Safe
Live show 10	Love is everything	"When You Believe" (with Ana-Maria Yanakieva)	Safe
Semi-final	One English and one Bulgarian song	"Listen"	Safe
Semi-final	One English and one Bulgarian song	"Малкия принц"	Safe
Final	One solo and one duet song	"A Little Party Never Killed Nobody (All We Got)"	Winner
Final	One solo and one duet song	"I Wanna Be Your Lover" (with Lyubo Kirov)	Winner
Final	Songs of the series	"I Have Nothing"	Winner

=== 2014–2017: Virginia Records and VIP Brother Bulgaria ===
On 12 June 2014, Bergendorff's debut single, titled "Samuray" was released by Virginia Records. The song was written by Rushi Vidinliev, and the music and arrangement were done by Ray Hedges and Nigel Butler. In December, a collaboration between Zhana and Kristo was released, with the name "Igraem S Teb Do Kraya". Few months later, on 9 May 2015, her second single was released, titled "Nevazmozhni Sme Sami". In 2016, Zhana took part of the VIP Brother 2016 season, where she entered second, lasted 41 days and was the fourth person eliminated from the house. Her last record with Virginia Records, called "Dokrai", was released on 7 January 2017 and she announced her departure from the company in mid–August when her contract wasn't renewed.

=== 2018: Eurovision Song Contest ===
On 12 March 2018, it was announced that Bergendorff will be part of the group named Equinox, which will represent Bulgaria in the Eurovision Song Contest 2018 with their song "Bones". They finished 14th in the Grand Final.

== Personal life ==
Zhana has one son Leon, born in 2010. She is married to Stefan Bergendorff, a Danish ship engineer she met in South Korea. She has lived in South Korea and Denmark. She speaks Bulgarian, English, Korean and Danish.

In 2016, she was arrested and charged for usage of cocaine.

== Discography ==
List of singles as main artist
Title	Year	Album
"Samuray"	2014	Non-album singles
"Igraem s teb do kraya" (Kristo featuring Zhana Bergendorff)	2014	Non-album singles
"Nevazmozhni sme sami"	2015	Non-album singles
"Vreme" (Moisey featuring Zhana Bergendorff)	2015	Non-album singles
"Dokrai"	2017	Non-album singles
"—" denotes a recording that did not chart or was not released in that territory.

== Tours ==
- The Voice of Summer Tour 2014
- Coca-Cola Happy Energy Tour 2014
- The Voice of Summer Tour 2015

Awards and achievements
Preceded by Raffi Boghosyan	X Factor Bulgaria; Winner; 2013	Succeeded by Slavin Slavchev
Preceded by Kristian Kostov with "Beautiful Mess"	Bulgaria in the Eurovision Song Contest (as part of Equinox); 2018	Succeeded by Victoria with "Tears Getting Sober"
