= Slavin Slavchev =

Bulgarian singer and songwriter (born 1991)

Slavin Slavchev Славин Славчев
- Born: Slavin Slavchev; March 7, 1991 (age 35); Provadia, Bulgaria
- Origin: Varna, Bulgaria
- Genres: Rock, Pop rock
- Occupation: Singer
- Instruments: Vocals, guitar, bass guitar
- Years active: 2014–present

Slavin Slavchev (Bulgarian: Славин Славчев, born 7 March 1991) is a Bulgarian singer and songwriter currently a lead vocal and bass guitarist in Julian's Laughter. He is the winner of the 2014 season of Bulgarian X Factor.

== Career ==
=== 2014–2015:X Factor Bulgaria ===
Slavchev was part of the third season of X Factor and won it. In the first week of the show he performed Cryin' by Aerosmith. Zaki said that after this performance he believed that Slavchev could give a new life to the rock music in Europe. He moved on to week 2 by being among the highest number of vote winners. Second week was a Halloween night where he performed Love Runs Out by OneRepublic. In the next week's show he performed "Give in to Me" and the Bulgarian song "Блус за двама". After his performance of Queen's hit "Who Wants to Live Forever" the judges called it the best performance of the season and that they see him as a potential winner. At the final show he presented a duet with Joe Lynn Turner performing the Rainbow's song "Street of Dreams" He won the show after this being on the final with Mihaela Marinova (third) and Nevena Peykova (runner-up).

The X Factor performances and results
Episode	Theme	Song	Result
First audition	Free choice	"Hold the Line"	Through to bootcamp
Bootcamp – stage 1	Group performance	"Sweet Child o' Mine"	Through to stage 2
Bootcamp – stage 2	Solo performance	"Rosanna"	Through to judges' houses
Judges' houses	Free choice	"Love of My Life"	Through to live shows
Live show 1	Heroes	"Cryin'"	Safe
Live show 2	Halloween	"Love Runs Out"	Safe
Live show 3	Number-ones	"Give in to Me"	Safe
Live show 4	Hits from Balkans and Eastern Europe	"Блус за двама"	Safe
Live show 5	USA vs. Europe	"Who Wants to Live Forever"	Safe
Live show 6	Movie Soundtracks	"Eye of the Tiger"	Safe
Live show 7	Love songs	"Hard to Say I'm Sorry"	Safe
Live show 8	Boys sing girls songs and girls boys	"Listen"	Safe
Christmas show	Christmas edition	"Happy Xmas"	No eliminations
Live show 9	Love is everything	"Can't Let You Go"	Safe
Live show 9	Love is everything	"Close My Eyes Forever" (with Mihaela Marinova)	Safe
Live show 10	Tears and laughter	"I Want to Break Free"	Safe
Live show 10	Tears and laughter	"I Want to Know What Love Is"	Safe
Semi-final	One English and one Bulgarian song	"Satisfaction"	Safe
Semi-final	One English and one Bulgarian song	"Уморени крила"	Safe
Final	One solo and one duet song	"Cryin'"	Winner
Final	One solo and one duet song	"Street of Dreams" (with Joe Lynn Turner)	Winner
Final	Songs of the series	"Високо"	Winner

=== 2015–2017: Debut singles ===
Exclusive in the final of X Factor he performed him first solo single "Ela" (Come). Lately it was released and a video of the song which had scenes from all performs of Slavin on X Factor's stage. In the summer of 2015 he released and him 2nd single "Losh Sum za Teb" (I'm bad for you) by Wow Productions. The Bulgarian model Queenie-Alice Nicolova took part in the video.

=== 2017–present: Julian's Laughter ===
In 2017 Slavin, together with Miloslav Petrov, Tihomir Vasilev and Nikolay Nikolaev established the alternative/art rock band Julian's Laughter.

== Discography ==
List of singles as main artist
Title	Year	Peak chart positions							Album
Title	Year	BUL	US	CAN	IRE	NZ	SV	UK	Album
Ела	2015	15	—	—	—	—	—	—N/a	
Лош съм за теб	2015	31	—	—	—	—	—	—N/a	
"—" denotes a recording that did not chart or was not released in that territory.

== Personal life ==
Slavchev studied law in Veliko Tarnovo University. He is a member and front-man of the hard-rock/progressive/alternative band Century (formed in Varna, Bulgaria in 2012). During the show he announced that he broke up with his girlfriend.
