= Alisia (singer) =

Bulgarian singer

Alisia Алисия
- Born: Asya Plamenova Doycheva; 1 March 1982 (age 44); Ihtiman, Bulgaria
- Genres: Chalga; folk
- Occupation: singer
- Label: Ara Music

Asya Plamenova Doycheva (Bulgarian: Ася Пламенова Дойчева), known professionally as Alisia (Bulgarian: Алисия), is a Bulgarian singer. She was born on 1 March 1982 in Ihtiman. She has twin brothers, and she has one child, Valeri Bojinov, with the footballer of the same name. She has been signed with Ara Music since 2002 and has recorded five albums with them. Through the years, she has won multiple awards.

She has finished Sofia University.

== Discography ==
- Sini noshti (2002)
- Pozhelay me (2004)
- Az sam sexy (2005)
- Nai-vurvezhen (2008)
- Tvoya totalno (2010)
