= Mihaela Marinova =

Bulgarian singer and songwriter

- Born: Mihaela Marinova; May 7, 1998 (age 28); Sofia, Bulgaria
- Genres: Pop; R&B
- Occupation: Singer-songwriter
- Instrument: Vocals
- Years active: 2013 – present
- Label: Virginia Records

Mihaela Marinova (Bulgarian: Михаела Маринова; born 7 May 1998) is a Bulgarian singer - Mihaela Marinova is a multiple-time award winner and X Factor Bulgaria 2014 finalist. She is also part of the country’s biggest record label – Virginia Records. Having performed with her at the X Factor finale, British superstar James Arthur shares: “When I first saw Mihaela, I thought she had an incredible talent. She’s got all it takes to become a world success.” Her groundbreaking singles and videos have gathered more than 60M views and streams. Each of the tracks have been at leading positions in the Official Airplay Chart, with her smashing debut “Stapka Napred” (2015) having spent 5 consecutive weeks at #1. The following year (2016) the song brought Mihaela the prestigious awards “Song of the Year”, “Best Debut” and “Video of the Year” at the Bulgarian Annual Music Awards.

== Career ==
=== X Factor Bulgaria ===
==== 2013: Season 2 ====
Mihaela participated in the 2nd season of the show and make it to the judge's houses where her menthor Zaki decided to choose between her or Ana-Maria Yanakieva since they both were 15 years old and the show have limit of 16 years. Zaki decided to give chance to Ana-Maria, but gave Mihaela a special "golden ticket" which allowed her to start from judges houses in the next season of the show. Later Ana Maria finished as runner-up in the show.

==== 2014–2015: Season 3 ====
Even though Mihaela had a reserved place for the judges houses, she decided not to use it and start the show from the auditions, as she said that would have been unfair to the other participants. This time she made it through to the finals and finished in third place after Slavin Slavchev won the season. At the final she made a duet with James Arthur, the winner of the ninth series of The X Factor UK in 2012.

The X Factor performances and results
Episode	Theme	Song	Result
First audition	Free choice	"Broken-Hearted Girl"	Through to bootcamp
Bootcamp – stage 1	Group performance	"Sweet Child o' Mine"	Through to stage 2
Bootcamp – stage 2	Solo performance	"My Kind of Love"	Through to judges' houses
Judges' houses	Free choice	"Bound to You"	Through to live shows
Live show 1	Heroes	"Hurt"	Safe
Live show 2	Halloween	"Chandelier"	Safe
Live show 3	Number-ones	"Queen of the Night"	Bottom two (11th)
Live show 3	Final showdown	"Believe"	Bottom two (11th)
Live show 4	Hits from Balkans and Eastern Europe	"Без теб"	Safe
Live show 5	USA vs. Europe	"The Edge of Glory"	Safe
Live show 6	Movie Soundtracks	"Aquarius/Let the Sunshine In"	Safe
Live show 7	Love songs	"Don't You Remember"	Safe
Live show 8	Boys sing girls songs and girls boys	"Recovery"	Bottom two (6th)
Live show 8	Final showdown	"Think"	Bottom two (6th)
Christmas show	Christmas edition	"All I Want for Christmas Is You"	No eliminations
Live show 9	Love is everything	"Why Don't You Want Me"	Safe
Live show 9	Love is everything	"Close My Eyes Forever" (with Slavin Slavchev)	Safe
Live show 10	Tears and laught	"Waka Waka"	Safe
Live show 10	Tears and laught	"Someone like You"	Safe
Semi-final	One English and one Bulgarian song	"Simply The Best"	Safe
Semi-final	One English and one Bulgarian song	"За Тебе Бях"	Safe
Final	One solo and one duet song	"Queen of the Night"	Third place (3rd)
Final	One solo and one duet song	"Bound to You" (with James Arthur)	Third place (3rd)

=== 2015–present: Debut single and first steps ===
Mihaela Marinova auditioned for Series 3 of X Factor Bulgaria and made it all the way to the final as part of the Girls category mentored by Sanya Armutlieva. She finished in 3rd place behind runner-up Nevena Peykova and winner Slavin Slavchev.

Mihaela Marinova was signed by Virginia Records. In the summer of 2015 her debut single "Stapka Napred" (Step Forward) was released. Her single become number 1 in charts in Bulgaria with over a million views in YouTube.

In 2019 she participated in the Bulgarian edition of "The masked singer", she was presented as Garvanat (The Raven) and finished in first place.

Mihaela Marinova participated in Като две капки вода, the Bulgarian version of "Your Face Sounds Familiar".

== Discography ==
=== Albums ===
List of studio albums, with selected chart positions, sales figures and certifications
Title	Album details	Peak chart positions	Sales
Title	Album details	BUL	Sales
Stupka napred	Released: March 26, 2020; Label: Virginia Records; Formats: CD, digital download, LP	2	
Do bezkrai	Released: December 9, 2022; Label: Virginia Records; Formats: CD, digital download, LP	—	
Cherna peperuda	Released: September 25, 2024; Label: Virginia Records; Formats: CD, digital download, LP	—	

=== Singles ===
List of singles as main artist
Title	Year	Peak chart positions	Album
Title	Year	BUL	Album
"Stapka napred" (Step forward)	2015	-	Stapka napred
"Ne ti li stiga" (Haven't you had enough)	2016	-	Stapka napred
"Edin sreshtu drug" (Against each other)	2017	-	Stapka napred
"Listata padat" (The leaves are falling ft. Pavell & Venci Venc)	2017	-	Stapka napred
"Ochi v Ochi" (Face to Face)	2018	-	Stapka napred
"Tiempo"	2018	-	—N/a
"Samo teb" (Only You) / "Now or Never"	2019	-	Stapka napred
"Moga" (I can ft. Lubo Kirov)	2020	-	Stapka napred
"Strah ot samota" (Scared to be lonely)	2020	-	Stapka napred
"Drugata staya" (The Other Room)	2020	-	Stapka napred
"Whispers"	2021	-	—N/a
"Serial" (Series)	2021	-	Do bezkrai
"Need You"	2021	-	—N/a
"Do bezkrai"	2022	-	Do bezkrai
"Sladka greshka"	2023	-	Do bezkrai
"Samo ti"	2023	-	Do bezkrai
"Takava lubov"	2023	-	Do bezkrai
"Vselena" feat. Lubo Kirov	2024	-	Do bezkrai
"Da izbyagam"	2024	-	Cherna peperuda
"Geroi"	2024	-	Cherna peperuda
"Tsyalata lubov"	2025	-	Cherna peperuda
"Ti Si Sartse" feat. Kristian Kostov	2025	-	
"100 Mechti"	2025	-	
"Ako mozheh" feat. TINO	2025	-	
"Under Pressure"	2026	-	
"—" denotes that Record Producer is Virginia Records.
