= Valentin Mihov =

Bulgarian footballer

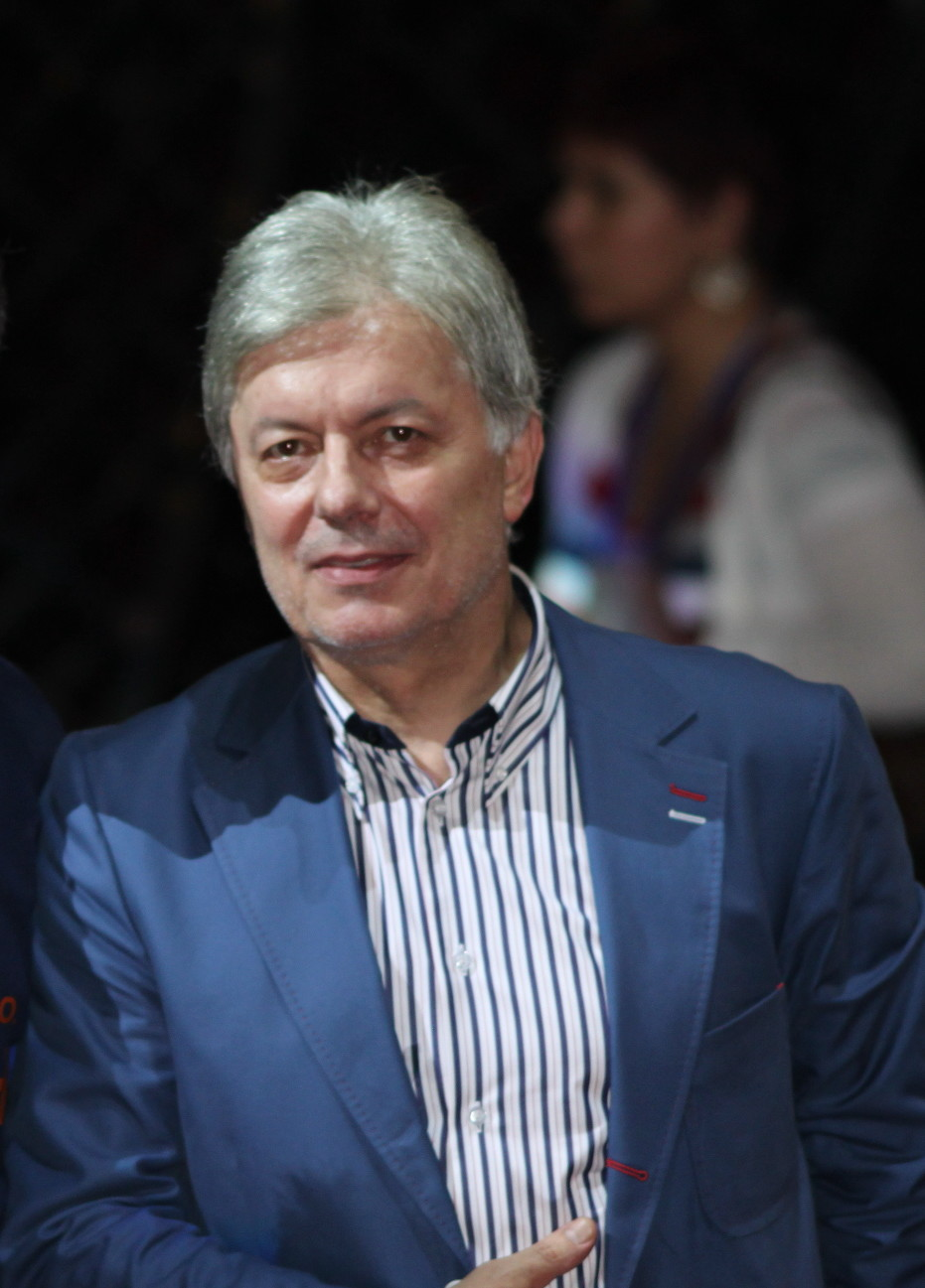
Valentin Mihov in 2011

Valentin Mihov (Bulgarian: Валентин Михов) (born on 18 January 1954 in Sofia) is a former Bulgarian football player. He is a former president of the Bulgarian Football Union (BFU) and the Bulgarian Professional Football League (PFL).

== Biography ==
Valentin Mihov earned a degree in International Economic Relations at the University of National and World Economy in Sofia. Then he worked at the Ministry of Transport and Korekom. He was awarded the title Honorary Citizen of the town of Svishtov in 2004.

== Football career ==
=== Playing career ===
As a child Mihov played in CSKA Sofia's junior teams. While doing his military service from 1972 to 1974 he played for FC Lokomotiv Gorna Oryahovitsa. Later he played for Akademik Svishtov while he was studying at the Higher Institute of Finances and Economics in Svishtov. He played for the team until 1978 having meanwhile reached the A grupa. In 1991, he became the president of CSKA Sofia after Boris Stankov left the position. In 1992 the club won the Bulgarian football championship. Between 1993 and 1994 he was the president of the BFU. After this he became the managing director of Litex Lovech and Slavia Sofia. In 1998, he was elected the president of the PFL. He owns Akademik Svishtov since 2000.

== Personal life ==
Mihov is married and has one daughter.
