= Milena Slavova =

Bulgarian rock singer (born 1966)

Milena Slavova Милена Славова
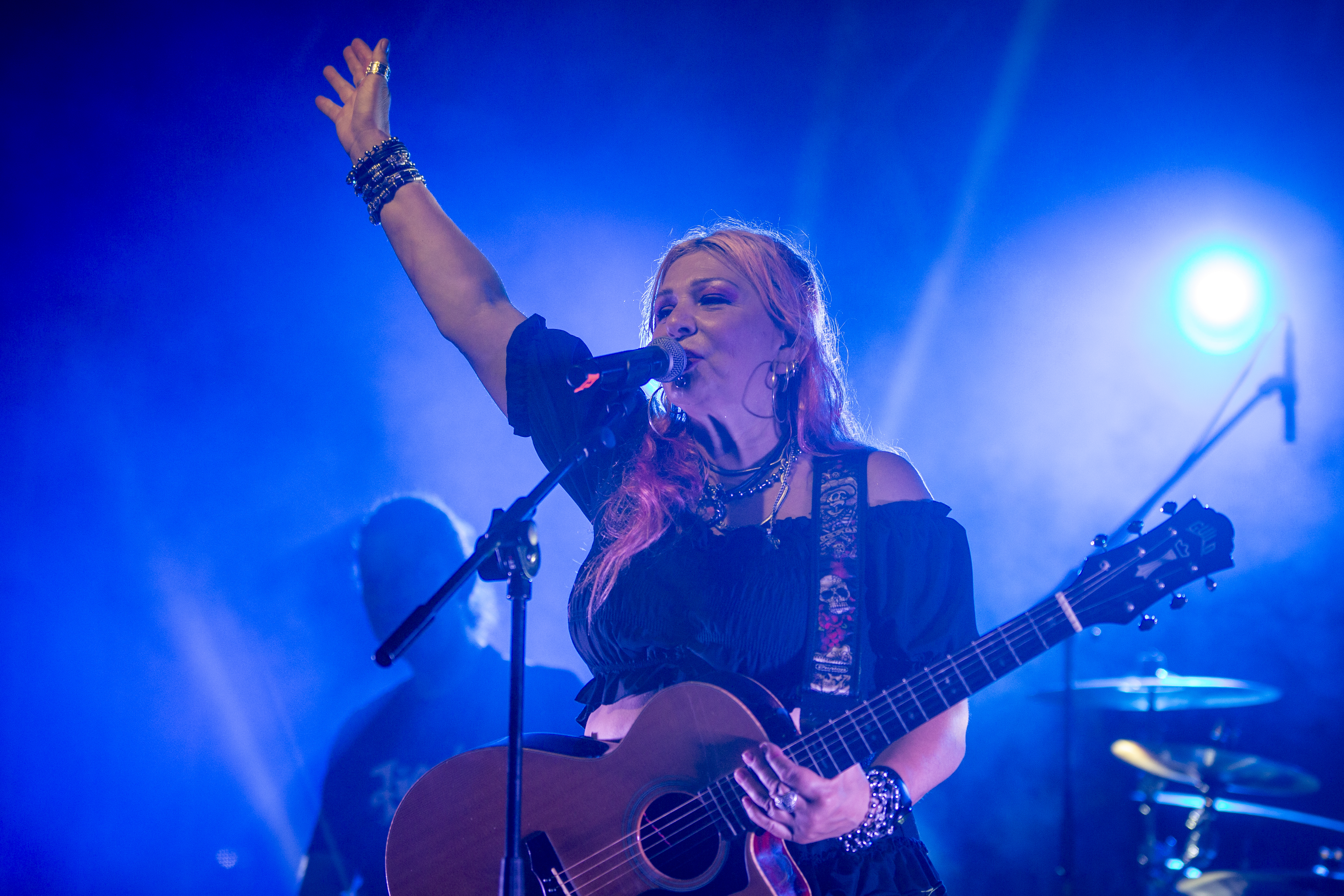
- Slavova in 2025

Background information
- Born: Milena Slavova; 24 February 1966 (age 60); Sofia, PR Bulgaria
- Genres: Punk rock New wave
- Occupation: Singer
- Instrument: Vocals
- Years active: 1985–present
- Labels: Review; Orion; Era

Milena Slavova (Bulgarian: Милена Славова) is a Bulgarian punk rock singer.

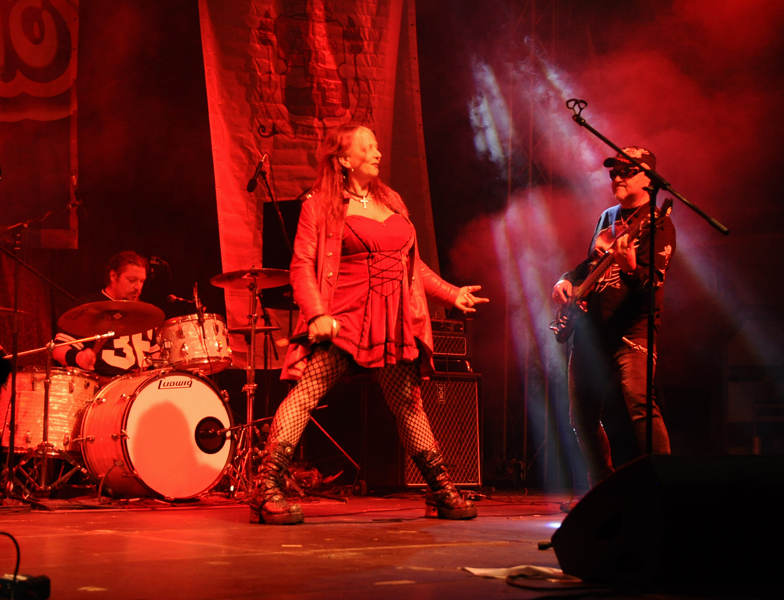
Milena Slavova in 2016

== Career ==
Referred to as "the most provocative female musician on the Bulgarian rock scene" of the 1980s, Slavova was known for breaking musical norms and was labeled as an outsider by the country's totalitarian rulers at the time, thereby earning the admiration of the rebellious youth.

Slavova began singing in 1985 and by 1986 had founded her own band, called Milena, which later changed its name to Review. She recorded six studio albums during her career.

In later years, she hosted a television show called Рок с Милена (Rock with Milena) on BNT2.

== Discography ==
- МИЛЕНА + РЕВЮ (1989)
- Ha-Ha (1991)
- The Scandal (1993)
- Sold (1994)
- Дъ best + (1999)
- 13 (2015)
