= Vasil Naydenov =

Bulgarian singer-songwriter (born 1950)

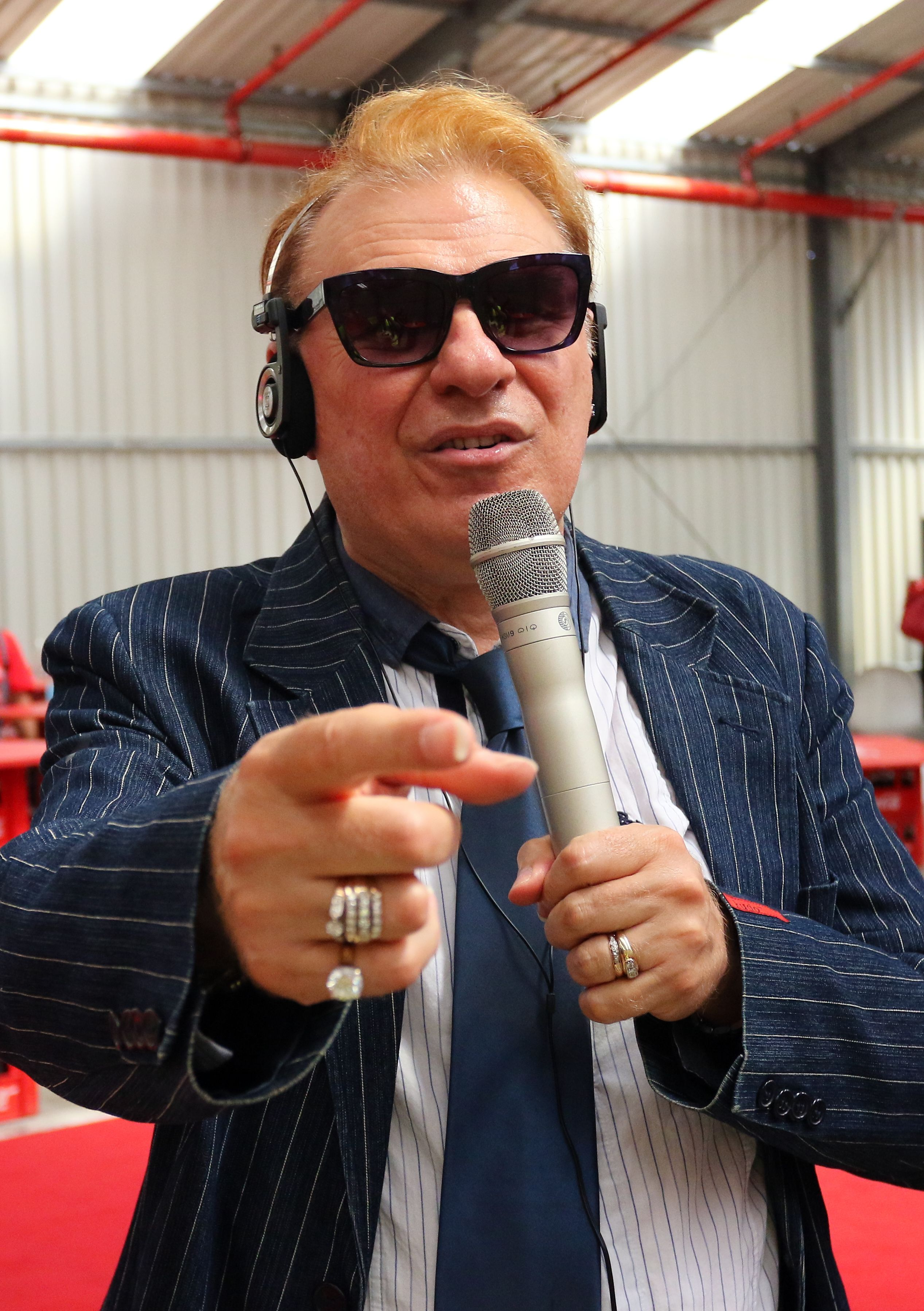

Background information
- Birth name: Vasil Naydenov
- Born: 3 September 1950 (age 74); Sofia, Bulgaria
- Origin: Bulgaria
- Genres: Pop, Pop rock, Jazz
- Occupation: Singer-songwriter
- Instrument: Piano
- Years active: 1973–present
- Labels: Balkanton

Vassil Naydenov (Cyrillic: Васил Найденов) is a Bulgarian singer-songwriter who rose to prominence in his native country and the Eastern bloc during the late 1970s and 1980s.

== Biography and career ==
Naydenov was born on 3 September 1950 in Sofia, Bulgaria. He studied music at the Faculty of Popular Music at the Bulgarian Musical Academy, where he honed his skills at the piano, the trumpet, and other instruments. He has participated in many musical bands. For example, he was the frontman of the famous Bulgarian progressive rock-group "Diana Express" between 1973 and 1979. However, he is renowned mostly for his solo career, which started in 1979 with his first hit "А дали е така"(Is It Really So?). Despite strict government regulations in popular music, his career quickly gained momentum throughout the 1980s, as he churned out hit after hit such as "По първи петли" (1980), "Любовта продължава", "Мелодия на годината", "Телефонна любов" (all three released in 1982), "Междучасие" (A break/ Recess, by songwriter Jivko Kolev/ Живко Колев), "Чудо" (both in 1983) and "Сбогом казах" (1985).

In 2019 he wrote his new single "On a Random Train Station" (2019).
