= Kutsy Vaptsarov =

Bulgarian Film Director

Katsi Vaptsarov
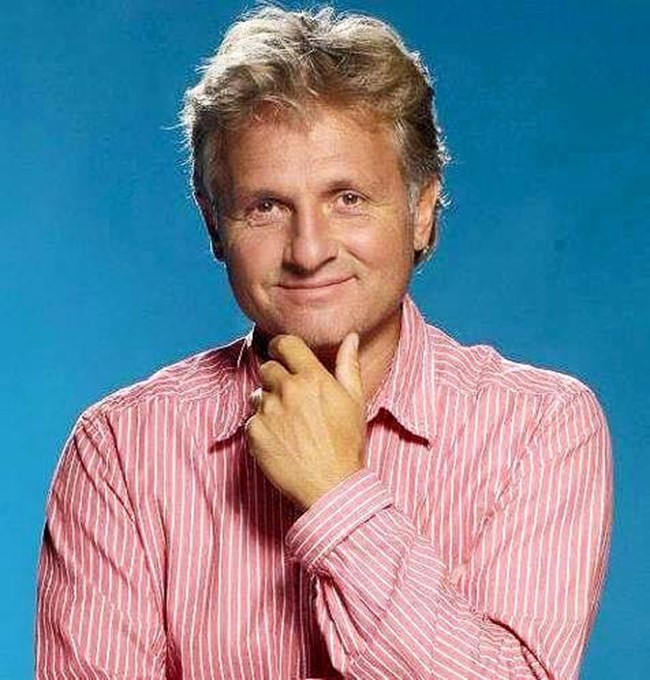
- Born: July 25, 1963 (age 62); Rousse, Bulgaria
- Occupation: television host
- Children: 3

Katsi Vaptsarov (born Krastyo Georgiev Vaptsarov) (Bulgarian: Къци Вапцаров, or Кръстю Георгиев Вапцаров) (born July 25, 1963) is a popular Bulgarian television host and film director.

His name is sometimes also transliterated as Katzi Vaptzarov.

== Career ==
Vaptzarov graduated from NATFIZ, specializing in puppetry. His TV career began in 1991 as a producer of the children's show "Кой е по-по-най" (Who is the best), but he gained prominence as the host of "Невада" (Nevada) and "Риск печели, риск губи" (Taking risks could mean wins, but also losses).

In 2008, he earned a degree as a film director from NATFIZ.

Vaptsarov's 2008 film "Добре дошли на Земята" (Welcome to earth) earned first place at the Philadelphia Independent Film Festival in the "best short" category.
