= Music of Bulgaria =

Music associated with Bulgaria

The music of Bulgaria refers to all forms of music associated with the country of Bulgaria, including classical, folk, popular music, and other forms.

Classical music, opera, and ballet are represented by composers Emanuil Manolov, Pancho Vladigerov, Vesselin Stoyanov and Georgi Atanasov; instrumentalists such as pianist Alexis Weissenberg, described in The Guardian as a Bulgarian-born pianist with an international career, and violinist Mincho Minchev, whose performing career has included appearances at Carnegie Hall, the Kennedy Center, the Bolshoi Theatre, the Tchaikovsky Concert Hall, the Royal Festival Hall and the Royal Albert Hall; and singers Ghena Dimitrova, Anna Tomowa-Sintow, Boris Hristov, Raina Kabaivanska and Nicolai Ghiaurov. Bulgarian conductors with international careers include Emil Tchakarov, who won third prize at the 1971 Herbert von Karajan Conducting Competition and later appeared at the Metropolitan Opera; Emil Tabakov, winner of the Nikolai Malko International Competition for Young Conductors and former music director of the Sofia Soloists, Sofia Philharmonic and Belgrade Philharmonic; Ruslan Raychev, whose career included work with major opera and symphonic institutions in Europe and beyond; Nayden Todorov, artistic director of the Sofia Philharmonic since 2017; Rossen Milanov, music director of the Columbus Symphony Orchestra, Chautauqua Symphony Orchestra and Princeton Symphony Orchestra; and Pavel Baleff, former chief conductor of the Philharmonie Baden-Baden and music director of Opéra de Limoges.

Notable names from the contemporary pop scene are DARA, Poli Genova, Lili Ivanova, Emil Dimitrov and Vasil Naydenov. Prominent Bulgarian artists living abroad include Sylvie Vartan, Kristian Kostov, Philipp Kirkorov, Lucy Diakovska, Mira Aroyo, Mikhael Paskalev, Nora Nova, Vasko Vassilev and Ivo Papazov.

The Bulgarian State Television Female Vocal Choir has received a Grammy Award in 1990. The Philip Kutev Ensemble, the first of the Bulgarian state-sponsored folk ensembles and founded in 1951, also is featured on the 1990 Grammy-winning album and has had many well-known Bulgarian folk singers, including, at present, Neli Andreeva and Sorina Bogomilova. Rhodope folk singer Valya Balkanska has recorded the folk song "Izlel ye Delyo Haydutin", which was included on the Golden Disk sent into space with the Voyager spacecraft in 1977.

== Instruments ==
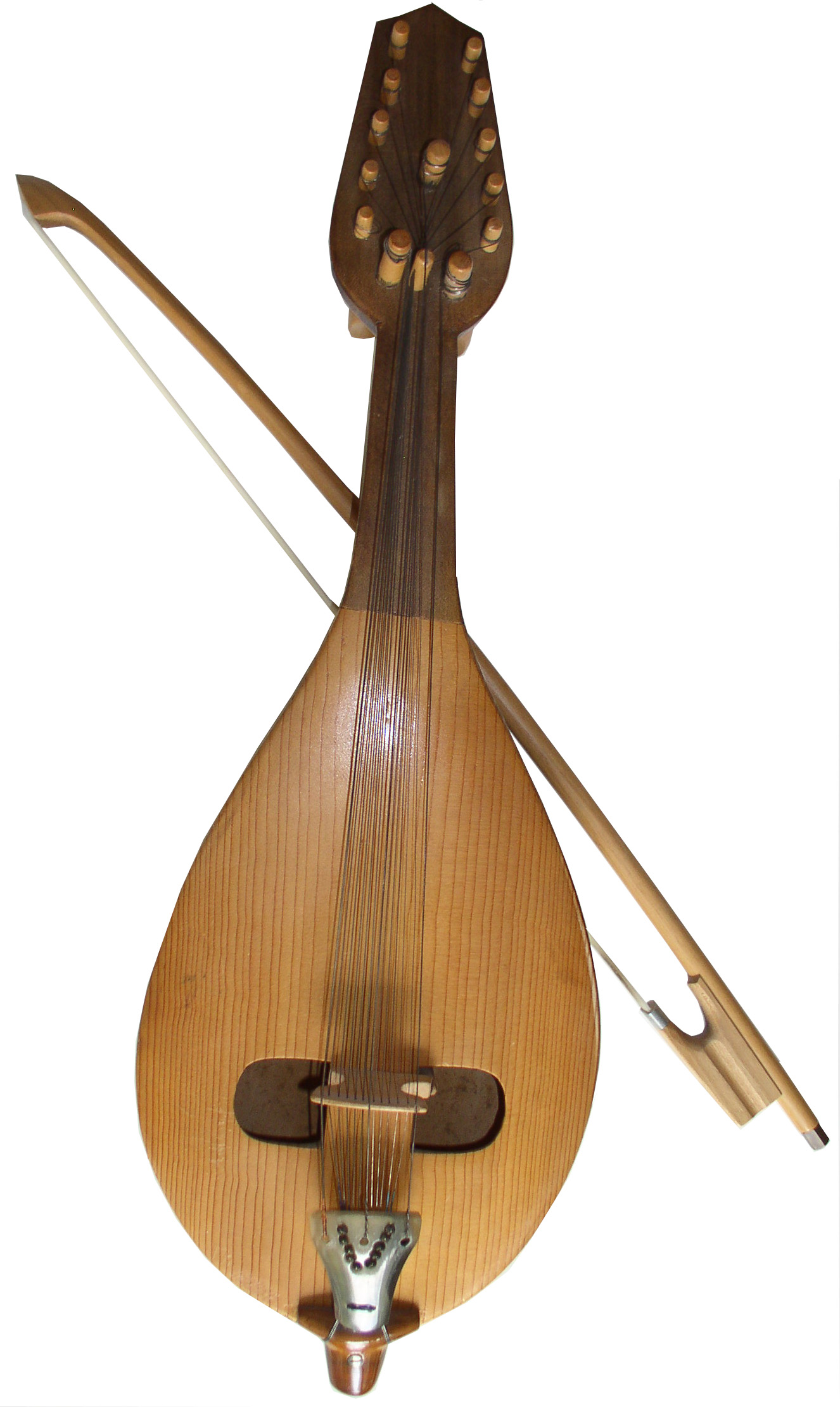
Gadulka

Bulgarian music uses a wide range of instruments. Some folk instruments are variants of traditional Asian instruments such as the "Saz" (Bulgarian tambura), or the kemençe (Bulgarian gadulka). More modern style instruments are often used in the modern dance music that is an offshoot of traditional village music.

Bulgarian folk bands, called bitovi, use instruments that commonly include

- The daire was a tambourine of varna folk music of eastern balkans of Bulgarian traditional musical instruments of rhopode regions closed was a sleigh bells or tambourine and big daire.
- The accordion is closed-keyboard instrument of rhopode region and strandja regions of Bulgaria keyboard instruments was bayan and the concertina
- The gaida, a traditional goat-skin bagpipe. There are two common types of gaida. The Thracian gaida is tuned either in D or in A. The Rhodopean gaida, called the kaba gaida, is larger, has a much deeper sound and is tuned in F.
- The kaval, an end-blown flute is very close to the Turkish kaval, as well as the Arabic "Ney."
- The gadulka, a bowed stringed instrument perhaps descended from the rebec, held vertically, with melody and sympathetic strings. The bass gadulka has largely been replaced by the double bass (called in Bulgarian a contrabas).
- The tǔpan, a large drum worn over the shoulder by the player and hit with a beater ("kiyak") on one side and a thin stick ("osier") on the other.
- The tambura, a long-necked, metal-strung, fretted lute used for rhythmic accompaniment as well as melodic solos. It is somewhat like the Greek bouzouki and very similar to the Tamburica family's "alto" instrument, the brac.
- The tarambuka or dumbek, an hourglass-shaped finger-drum. It is very similar to the Macedonia and Serbia "darambuka" and the Bulgaria"Tarambuka" (Тарамбука).

Modern professional musicians soon reached new heights of innovation in using traditional Bulgarian instruments, by expanding the capacities of the gaida (Kostadin Varimezov and Nikola Atanasov Plamen Deyanski), gadulka (Mihail Marinov, Atanas Vulchev Ganka, Zhechko tenev) and kaval (Stoyan Chobanov, Nikola Ganchev, Stoyan Velichkov, Nedyalko Nedyalkov, Theodosii Spassov. Other instruments arrived in Bulgaria in the 19th century, including the accordion and the clarinet. Bulgarian accordion music was defined by Boris Karlov and later Roma musicians including Kosta Kolev and Ibro Lolov, Boshko.

In 1965, the Ministry of Culture founded the Koprivshtitsa National Music Festival, which has become an important event in showcasing Bulgarian music, singing and dance. It is held once every five years, and the last festival was 7–9 August 2015.

Instruments used in wedding music include violin, accordion, gaida, kaval, tapan, Tambura, guitar and Piano.

== Folk ==
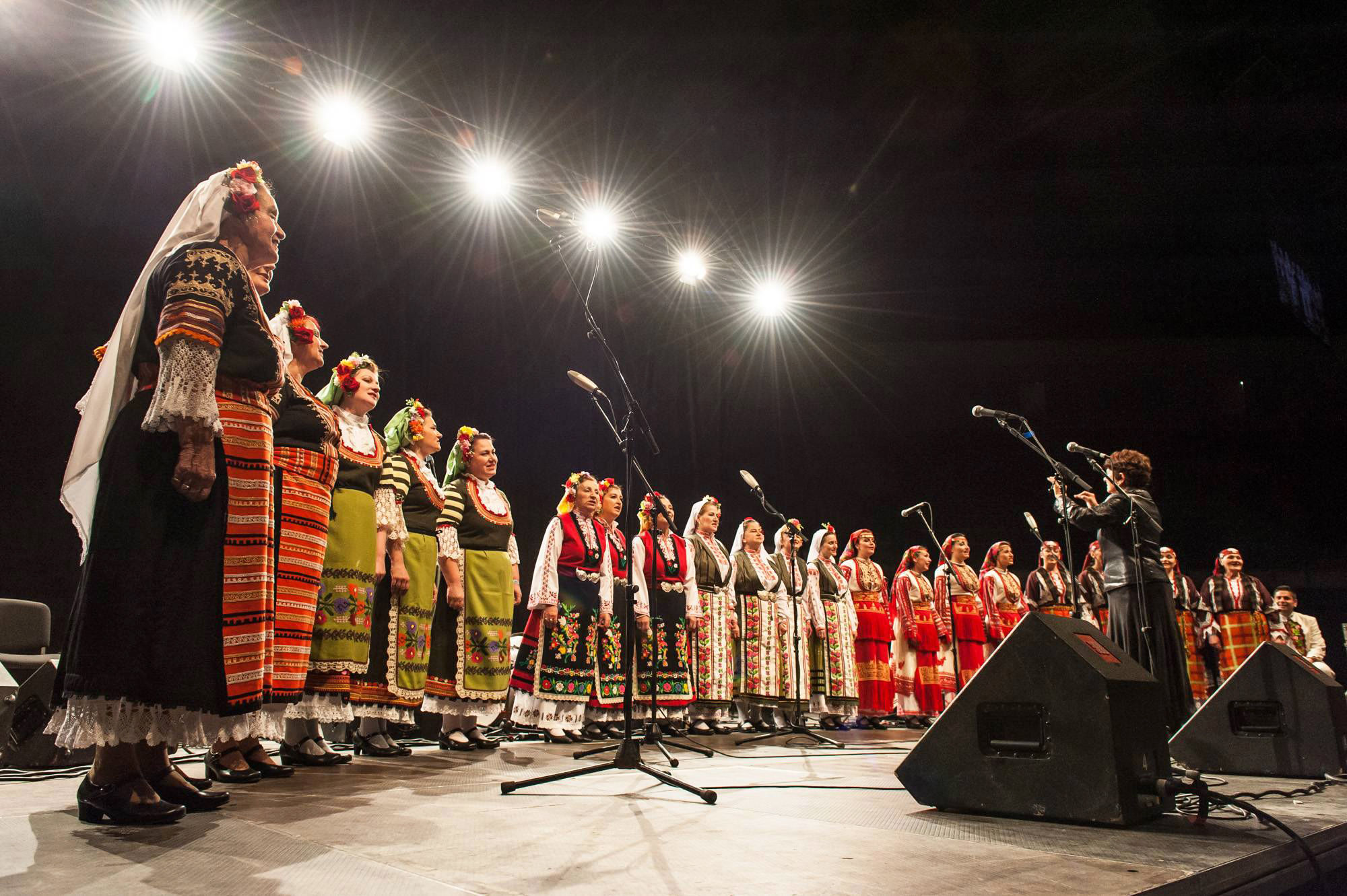
The Mystery of the Bulgarian Voices

Regional styles abound in Bulgaria. Northern Bulgaria, Dobruja, Shopluk, Thrace, Strandzha, Macedonia and Rhodopes - all have distinctive sounds.

Some folk music revolves around holidays like Christmas, New Year's Day, midsummer, and the Feast of St. Lazarus, as well as the Strandzha region's unusual Nestinarstvo rites, in which villagers fall into a trance and dance on hot coals as part of the joint feast of Sts Konstantin and Elena on 21 May. Music is also a part of more personal celebrations such as weddings.

Singing has always been a tradition for both men and women. Songs were often sung by women at work parties such as the sedenka (often attended by young men and women in search of partners to court), betrothal ceremonies, and just for fun. Women also had an extensive repertoire of songs that they sang while working in the fields.

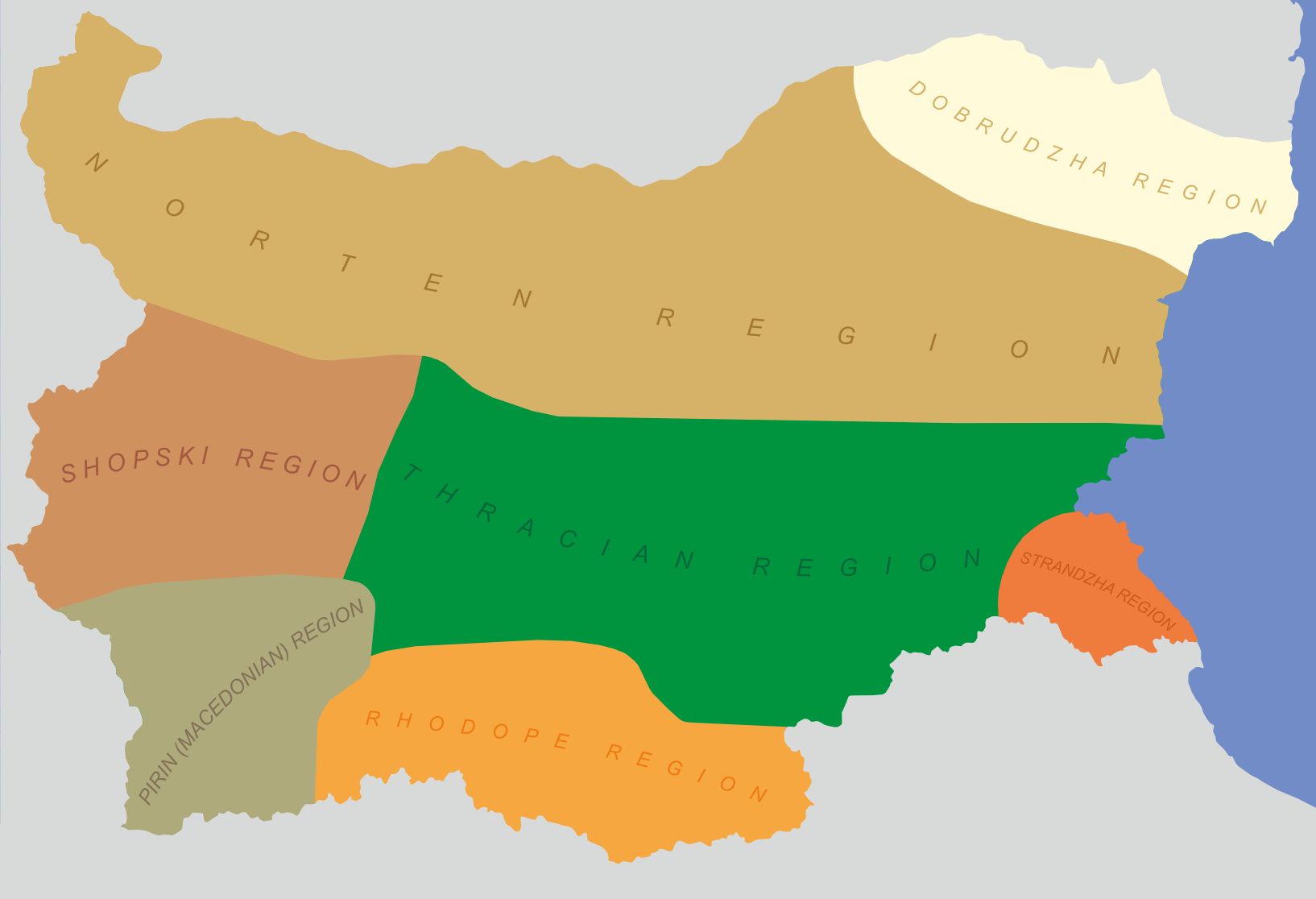
Folklore regions of Bulgaria

Young women eligible for marriage played a particularly important role at the dancing in the village square (which not too long ago was the major form of "entertainment" in the village and was a very important social scene). The dancing — every Sunday and for three days on major holidays like Easter — began not with instrumental music, but with two groups of young women singing, one leading each end of the dance line. Later on, instrumentalists might arrive and the singers would no longer lead the dance. A special form of song, the lament, was sung not only at funerals but also when young men departed for military service.

Bulgarian folk music is known for its asymmetrical rhythms (defined by the famous Hungarian composer and ethnomusicologist Béla Bartók as "Bulgarian rhythms"), where the meter is split into uneven combinations of short (two metric units) and long (three metric units) beats, corresponding to the dancers' short and long steps. In European folk music, such asymmetrical rhythms are commonly used in Bulgaria, Greece, elsewhere in the Balkans, and less commonly in Norway and Sweden.

The most important state-supported folk ensemble of the socialist era was the Sofia-based State Ensemble for Folk Songs and Dances, founded in 1951 and led by Filip Kutev (often anglicized as Philip Koutev). Kutev became perhaps the most influential musician of 20th century Bulgaria, and arranged rural music with harmonies more "accessible" to audiences in other countries, to great domestic acclaim. The ensemble has now been renamed the Philip Kutev Ensemble in his honor. In 1952, Georgi Boyadzhiev founded the group known today as the Bulgarian State Television Female Vocal Choir, which became famous worldwide after the release of a series of recordings entitled Le Mystère des Voix Bulgares.

The distinctive sounds of women's choirs in Bulgarian folk music come from their unique rhythms, harmony and vocal production. Characteristic polyphony, such as the use of close intervals like the major second and the singing of a drone accompaniment underneath the melody, are especially common in songs from the Shope region around the Bulgarian capital Sofia and the Pirin region (Bulgarian Macedonia). In addition to the ensemble led by Koutev, who adapted and arranged many of the harmonies, and composed several songs (as did his wife, Maria Kouteva) that were also performed by other groups, other women's vocal groups gained popularity, including Trio Bulgarka, consisting of Yanka Rupkina, Eva Georgieva, and Stoyanka Boneva. Some of these groups were included in the "Mystery of the Bulgarian Voices" tours.

Trio Bulgarka were featured on The Sensual World album by Kate Bush on the songs "Deeper Understanding", "Never Be Mine", and "Rocket's Tail". In 1993 they appeared on another Kate Bush album, The Red Shoes, in the songs "You're the One", "The Song of Solomon", and "Why Should I Love You?", which also featured Prince.

=== Asymmetric meters ===
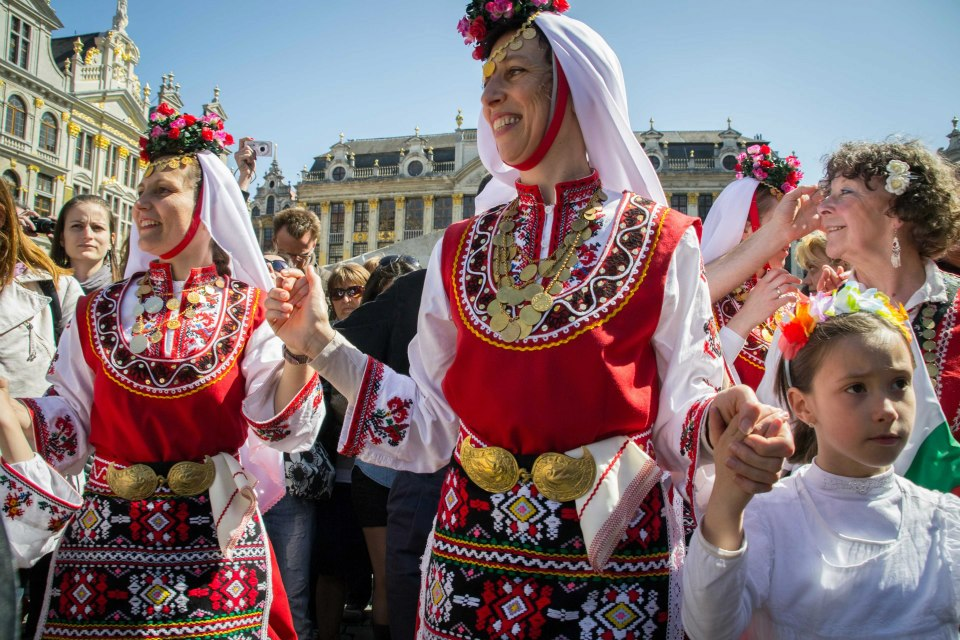
Bulgarian folk dances in Brussels, invited by the Bulgaria's EU Commissioner Kristalina Georgieva

One of the most distinctive features of Bulgarian folk music is the complexity of its rhythms in comparison to Western music. Although it uses Western meters such as 2/4, 3/4, and 4/4, Bulgarian music also includes meters with odd numbers of beats per measure, sometimes called asymmetric meters. These can be understood as combinations of groups of "quick" and "slow" beats. For example, the dance lesnoto ("the light/easy one") has a meter of seven beats with emphasis on the first, fourth, and sixth. This can be divided into three groups, a "slow" unit of three beats and two "quick" units of two beats, often written 3+2+2.

Each basic folk dance type uses a distinct combination of these rhythmic "units". Some examples of Bulgarian folk dances are rachenitsa (seven beats divided: 2+2+3), paydushko horo (five beats: 2+3), eleno mome (seven beats: 2+2+1+2), kopanitsa (eleven beats: 2+2+3+2+2), Bucimis (15 beats: 2+2+2+2+3+2+2), and pravo horo, which can either be standard 4/4 or 6/8.

Some rhythms with the same number of beats can be divided in different ways. Eight-beat rhythms can be divided 2+3+3, 3+2+3, 3+3+2, 2+2+2+2, 2+2+4, 2+4+2, 4+2+2, or 4+4.

=== Select discography ===
- Music of Bulgaria – Original 1955 Recording (Nonesuch 9 72011). Early recordings of Philip Koutev and the Ensemble of the Bulgarian Republic. This was one of Frank Zappa's favorite albums, and Bulgarian harmonies reportedly influenced the harmonies of Crosby, Stills, Nash & Young.
- Le Mystère des Voix Bulgares – (Nonesuch 9 79165 in the U.S.; 4AD Records CAD603CD in the UK). Featuring the Bulgarian State Radio and Television Female Choir. This is the world hit that introduced many to Bulgarian music. It is actually a collection of recordings by various artists and groups. A group that included some of these singers (and others) toured under this name.
- Village Music of Bulgaria – (Elektra/Nonesuch 9 79195). Two albums of field recordings by Martin Koenig on one CD (A Harvest, a Shepherd, a Bride, and In the Shadow of the Mountain). One of the tracks, a recording of "Izlel je Delyo Hajdutin", was included by Carl Sagan and Ann Druyan on the Voyager Golden Record.
- A song from the Rhodope Mountains, "Izlel ye Delyo Haydutin" by Valya Balkanska – Part of the Voyager Golden Record selection of music, included in the two Voyager spacecraft launched in 1977.*Balkana The Music of Bulgaria – (Hannibal HNCD 1335). Many of the songs are by Trio Bulgarka or one of its members.
- The Forest is Crying (Lament for Indje Voivoda) – (Hannibal HNCD 1342). By the Trio Bulgarka.
- Two Girls Started to Sing ... Bulgarian Village Singing – (Rounder CD 1055). Field recordings.
- Bulgarian Soul – Bulgarian operatic mezzo Vesselina Kasarova sings Bulgarian folk songs with the Cosmic Voices from Bulgaria. Songs are arranged by the Bulgarian composer Krassimir Kyurkchiyski and accompanied by the Sofia Soloists Chamber Orchestra.

=== Select artists and groups ===
- Bulgarian State Television Female Vocal Choir (Le Mystère des Voix Bulgares)
- Cosmic voices from Bulgaria
- Trio Bulgarka, Yanka Rupkina
- Valkana Stoyanova
- Valya Balkanska
- Boyana Cholakova
- Stefka Sabotinova
- Nikolina Chakardakova
- Neli Andreeva
- Nedialka Keranova
- Diko Iliev – compose Danube horo and other
- Filip Kutev
- Iliya Argirov
- Bulgare ensemble
- Daniel Spassov
- Svetoglas
- Neshka Robeva's spectacles
- Kostadin Gugov
- London Bulgarian Choir
- Kitka – based in Berkeley, California
- Nadka Karadjova
- Vulkana Stoyanova
- The Grannies From Bistritsa
- Oratnitza – contemporary band with folk influences
- Outhentic – contemporary ethno-jazz band
- Iliya Lukov
- Elitsa & Stoyan – contemporary electronic/folk duo
- Filip Kutev ensemble

== Orthodox ==
The tradition of church singing in Bulgaria is more than a thousand years old, and can be traced back to the early Middle Ages. One of the earliest known musical figures (composer, singer and musical reformer) of Medieval Europe John Kukuzel (1280–1360), known as The Angel-voiced for his singing abilities, has Bulgarian origins.

In the Bulgarian Orthodox Church, there are two traditions of church singing:

- Eastern monodic (one-voice) singing and choral (Polyphonic). The Eastern monodic singing observes the tradition of Greek and Byzantine music and the requirements of the eight-tones canon of the Eastern Orthodox chanting.
- The second tradition is rooted in choral church music, established during the 19th century, when Russian choral church music began to have an influence in Bulgaria. During the 19th and 20th century, many Bulgarian composers created their works in the spirit of Russian polyphony. Today, Orthodox music is alive and is performed both during church worship services and at concerts by secular choirs and soloists.

The following list shows contemporary Bulgarian choirs and singers that have a repertoire rooted in orthodox music:

- St. Alexandar Nevsky Cathedral Choir
- "Madrigal" Chamber Choir
- Sofia Boys' Choir
- Sofia Orthodox Choir
- Svetoglas
- Sofia Priest Choir
- Yoan Kukuzel Choir
- Opera singer Boris Hristov
- Opera singer Nikola Ghuzelev

== Classical ==
- Alexandra Fol
- Alexandrina Pendachanska
- Mihail Angelov
- Liudmil Angelov
- Anatoli Krastev
- Anna Tomowa-Sintow
- Anna-Maria Ravnopolska-Dean
- Ari Leschnikoff – actual name Asparuh Leschnikoff
- Boris Christoff
- Dobri Hristov
- Dobrin Petkov
- Dobrinka Tabakova
- Emil Tabakov
- Emil Tchakarov
- Georgi Tutev
- Ghena Dimitrova
- Gheorghi Arnaoudov
- Hristo Tsanoff
- Konstantin Iliev
- Mariana Paunova
- Milen Nachev
- Nayden Todorov
- Neva Krysteva
- Nicola Ghiuzelev
- Nicolai Ghiaurov
- Pancho Vladigerov
- Petko Dimitrov
- Raina Kabaivanska
- Ralitsa Tcholakova
- Rossen Milanov
- Sonya Yoncheva
- Svetla Protich
- Veneta Vicheva
- Vesselina Kasarova
- New Symphony Orchestra

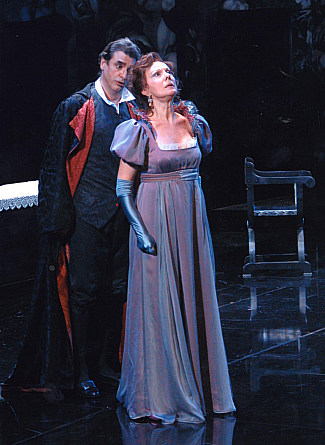
Raina Kabaivanska in Tosca, Madrid 2004

== Popular ==
Some of the most popular artists include:

- Lili Ivanova
- Emil Dimitrov
- Vasil Naydenov
- Bogdana Karadocheva
- Pasha Hristova
- Mariya Neikova
- Lea Ivanova
- Desi Dobreva
- Yordanka Hristova
- Margarita Hranova
- Riton Duet
- Todor Kolev
- Tonika
- Rositsa Kirilova
- Silvia Katsarova
- Stenli
- Veselin Marinov
- Diana Ekspress
- Grafa
- Karizma
- Miro
- Maria Ilieva
- Irina Florin
- Mariana Popova
- Mihaela Fileva
- Poli Genova
- Ruth Koleva
- Svetla Ivanova
- Mary Boys Band
- Rushi Vidinliev
- Shturcite
- FSB (band)
- Bo Bo Bo (band), Boris Godjunov, Borislav Grancharov and Boyan Ivanov, pop vocal trio
- Ice Cream (band)
- Stefan Valdobrev
- DARA
- Lubo Kirov
- Kamelia Todorova

=== Chalga ===
Chalga (pop-folk) is a contemporary music style that combines often provocative Bulgarian lyrics with popular Eastern European (rarely Russian and Ukrainian) and Turkish music. It is the Bulgarian version of the corresponding variations in neighbouring countries such as Greece (Laïkó), Serbia (Turbofolk) or Romania (manele).

This subgenre is rather a mixture of synthpop and gypsy music with Bulgarian wedding motives. Yuri Yunakov, a Bulgarian Romani saxophonist, is one of its creators with clarinetist Ivo Papazov. The album New Colors in Bulgarian Wedding Music highlights his amalgamation of traditional Bulgarian music with more modern elements.

During the Communist era, some folk musicians lived outside the state-supported music scene. Without official support, wedding bands were also without official limitations on their music, leading to fusions with foreign styles and instruments. Thrace was an important center of this music, which was entirely underground until 1986, when a festival of this music, which became a biennial event, was inaugurated in the town of Stambolovo, and artists like Sever, Trakiîski Solisti, Shoumen and Juzhni Vetar became popular, especially clarinetist Ivo Papasov.

== Select artists ==
- Azis
- Andrea
- Anelia
- Alisia
- Galena
- Gergana
- Gloria
- Desi Slava
- Dzhena
- DARA
- Emanuela
- Emilia
- Ivana
- Kamelia
- Konstantin
- Maria
- Milko Kalaidjiev
- Poli Genova
- Preslava
- Slavi Trifonov and Ku-Ku Band
- Sofi Marinova
- Toni Storaro
- Tsvetelina Yaneva

=== Jazz ===
- Ruth Koleva
- Theodosii Spassov
- Ivo Papazov
- Camellia Todorova
- Jivko Petrov
- Yildiz Ibrahimova
- Hilda Kazasyan
- Vasil Petrov
- Simeon Venkov – Moni
- Miroslav Ivanov
- Veselin Veselinov – Eko
- Michail Yossifov
- Milcho Leviev
- Batuhan Aydın
- Rossen Zahariev
- Anatoly Vapirov
- Hristo Yotzov
- Antoni Rikev
- Nikolay Danev
- Tri O FIve

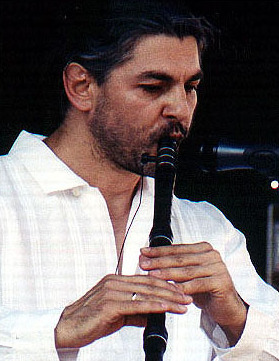
Theodosii Spassov performing

=== Electronic ===
- Deep Zone Project
- Esem
- Shamanez
- Mira Aroyo (of Ladytron)
- Valdi Sabev
- Apo & Nevena
- Gravity Co
- Ivan Shopov
- Stephan Panev
- Michail Goleminov
- Bulgaro
- Tibetan hearts
- KiNK

=== Rap ===
- Misho Shamara
- Spens
- Upsurt
- 100 Kila
- Krisko
- Homelesz
- Keranov
- Manata
- Jluch
- Qvkata DLG
- Grigovor
- Logo5
- Mr. Freesk
- F.O.
- Jay
- Soni Bonanza
- Wosh MC
- Sekta
- Skandau
- Fyre
- V:rgo

=== Rock, metal and new wave ===
- Ahat
- Akaga
- Georgi Minchev
- Signal
- FSB (Formatsia Studio Balkanton)
- Shturcite
- Hipodil
- Milena Slavova
- Balkandji
- Bandaracite
- Barabi Blues Band
- B.F.H.
- BTR
- Epizod
- Grimaze
- Monolith
- Nova Generacia
- Obraten Efekt
- Odd Crew
- Ostava
- Analgin
- Kontrol
- Kukeri
- Poduene Blues Band
- Srebyrnite grivni
- Tangra
- Wickeda
- Impulse
- Faktor
- Odd Crew
- Review

=== Punk and funk ===
- Novi Tsvetya ("New Flowers")
- D.D.T.
- Sub Zero Farm
- Viperfish
- The Scroletics
- Brothers in Blood
- U.Z.Z.U.
- Akaga

=== Reggae ===
- Sen I
- Zafayah
- Jahmmi Youth
- Roots Rocket Band
- Merudia
- Rebelites
- NRG D
- Ragga one
- Samity
- Root Souljah
- Kaya

== See also ==
- Music of Thrace
- Bistritsa Babi
