= Bulgarian State Television Female Vocal Choir =

Ensemble arranging Bulgarian folk melodies

The Mystery of the Bulgarian Voices
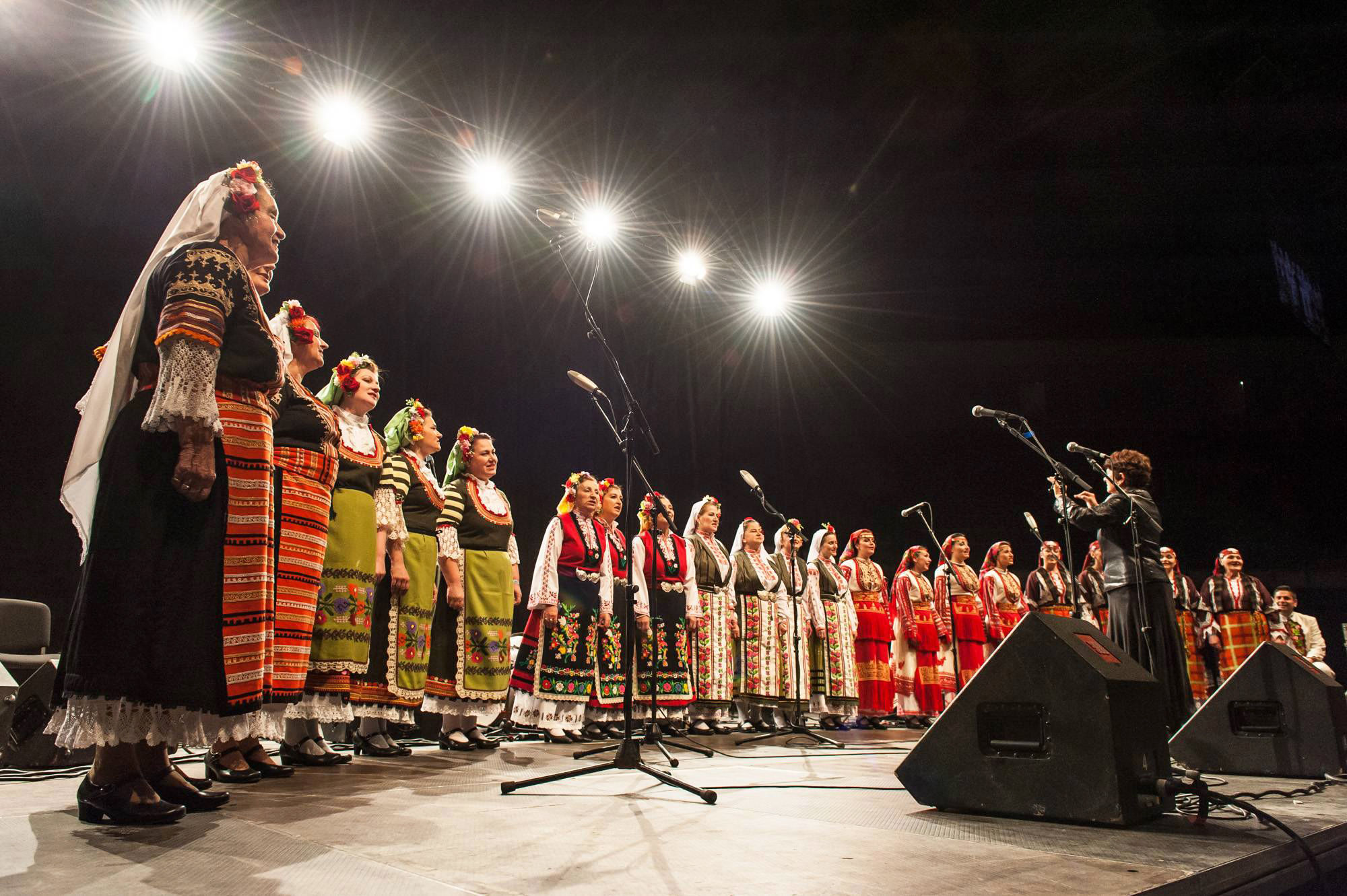

Background information
- Also known as: Bulgarian State Radio and Television Female Vocal Choir; Le Mystère des Voix Bulgares; The Mystery of the Bulgarian Voices
- Genres: Folk, world music
- Years active: 1952–present
- Labels: Disques Cellier, Nonesuch, 4AD, Polygram, Rhino, Schubert Music Publishing (current)

The Bulgarian State Television Female Vocal Choir is a Bulgarian musical ensemble that performs modern arrangements of traditional Bulgarian folk melodies. It is best known for its contribution to Marcel Cellier's Le Mystère des Voix Bulgares (The Mystery of the Bulgarian Voices) project, for which it was awarded the Grammy Award for Best Traditional Folk Album at the 32nd Grammy Awards in 1989.

First created by Georgi Boyadjiev in 1952 as the Ensemble for Folk Songs of the Bulgarian Radio, the choir is now directed by Dora Hristova. It was granted the name Le Mystère des Voix Bulgares by Marcel Cellier in 1997, in recognition of the fact that it had contributed most of the songs on the original compilations.

== Membership and methods ==
Singers are chosen from country villages for the beauty and openness of their voices, and undergo extensive training in the unique, centuries-old singing style. Influenced by Bulgaria's Thracian, Bulgarian, Ottoman and Byzantine history, their music makes use of diaphonic singing and distinctive timbre, as well as its modal scales, unusual meters (such as 7/8, 9/8, and 11/8), and dissonant harmonies (abundant second, seventh, and ninth intervals). All of these are characteristic of Bulgarian folk music.

== History ==
In 1951, Filip Kutev and Maria Kuteva founded the first professional national folk music ensemble in Bulgaria, the State Ensemble for Folk Song and Dance, now known as the Filip Kutev Ensemble. The State Television Choir followed in 1952. Though the latter choir became widely known when the trend-setting English alternative record label 4AD reissued a pair of anthology albums in 1986 and 1988 with the now famous title Le Mystère des Voix Bulgares, their recordings date as far back as 1957.

The first pressing of the Voix Bulgares album was the result of 15 years of work by Swiss ethnomusicologist and producer Marcel Cellier. It was released in 1975 on his Discs Cellier label. Ivo Watts-Russell, the founder of the 4AD Records label, was introduced to the choir by a third- or fourth-generation audio cassette lent to him by Peter Murphy of the band Bauhaus. He became entranced by the music, and tracked down and licensed the recordings from Cellier. They were one of four choirs to appear on the album Le Mystère des Voix Bulgares, Volume Two, which won Cellier a Grammy Award in 1989.

The group has since performed worldwide to great acclaim. In the late 1990s, the choir became known in the U.S. for its contributions to the music of Xena: Warrior Princess, whose theme music Joseph LoDuca developed from "Kaval sviri", one of the Bulgarian folk songs in the choir's repertoire. The choir's performance of Bear McCreary's song "Rhûn" is heard in episode 2 of season 2 of The Lord of the Rings: The Rings of Power.

== Trio Bulgarka ==
Three prominent soloists of the group have also performed together as Trio Bulgarka, known in the West primarily for singing on the Kate Bush albums The Sensual World and The Red Shoes. The trio also performed with the Italian rock band Elio e Le Storie Tese on the single Pipppero from the album İtalyan, rum casusu çikti, and has released two albums of its own. The three women in the trio are Stoyanka Boneva from Pirin, Yanka Rupkina from Strandja and Eva Georgieva from Dobrudja.

== Discography ==
- 1975 Le Mystère des Voix Bulgares, Compilation, Disques Cellier
- 1987 Cathedral Concert (Live), PolyGram (re-released in 1992)
- 1988 Le Mystère des Voix Bulgares, volume II, Disques Cellier
- 1989 Le Mystère des Voix Bulgares, volume III, Disques Cellier
- 1993 From Bulgaria with Love: the Pop Album, Rhino/Atlantic
- 1993 Melody Rhythm & Harmony, Rhino/Atlantic
- 1994 Ritual, Nonesuch/Elektra
- 1995 Box Set: Le Mystère des Voix Bulgares, volumes I–II and Ritual, Nonesuch/Elektra
- 1998 Le Mystère des Voix Bulgares, volume IV, Philips
- 2001 Bulgarian Custom Songs, Gega
- 2003 A Portrait of Nikolai Kaufmann, Riva Sound / KVZ Music Ltd.
- 2008 Music From Alone in the Dark, composed by Olivier Derivière, Milan Records
- 2017 Le Mystère des Voix Bulgares ft. Lisa Gerrard - Pora Sotunda (Single on a vinyl & digital)
- 2018 Le Mystère des Voix Bulgares ft. Lisa Gerrard - BooCheeMish (New album)

== See also ==
- Music of Bulgaria
- Bistritsa Babi
- State Ensemble for Folk Songs and Dances
