= Milen E. Ivanov =

Milen Ivanov
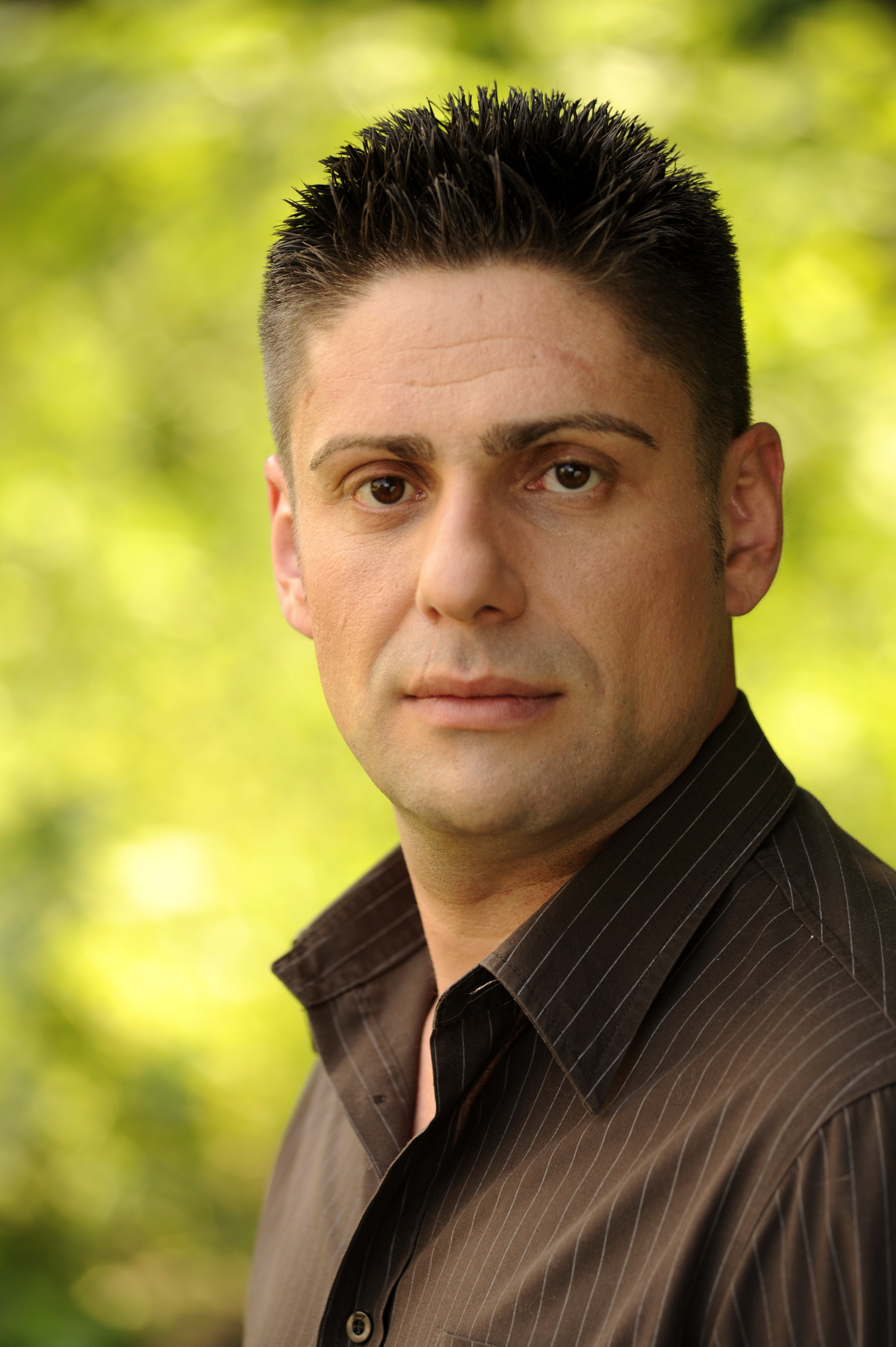

Background information
- Born: Milen E. Ivanov; 14 August 1975 (age 51)
- Origin: Pleven, Bulgaria
- Genres: Folk
- Occupation: Singer
- Instrument: Vocals
- Years active: 1998–present

Milen Ivanov (Bulgarian: Милен Иванов) (born 14 August 1975 in Pleven, Bulgaria) is a Bulgarian conductor and performer of folk songs.

== Biography ==
Milen Ivanov was born on 14 August 1975. He studied at the Panayot Pipkov Music School in Pleven and the Pancho Vladigerov National Academy of Music in Sofia, specialising in choral conducting in the class of Professor Lilia Gyuleva. He is an editor at Bulgarian National Television and hosts the TV shows "Bulgarian lessons" and "Goes our music" ("Ide nashenskata musica"). In 1996 Milen founded the Eva Quartet with Gergana Dimitrova, Sofia Kovacheva, Evelina Spasova, Daniela Stoichkova, all of them singers of "Le Mystère Des Voix Bulgares /The Mystery of Bulgarian Voices". In a short period of time the quartet has become one of the leading chamber folklore formations. Under Milen Ivanov's conducting Eva Quartet has released a few independent albums and given concerts in some of the most prestigious halls all over the world.

== History ==
Milen Ivanov is also a folklore singer. Since 1998 he has been working with Daniel Spassov. The two of them created the vocal formation "Dvuglas" ("Two voices") and have given concerts in Bulgaria and abroad (Austria, Germany, Czech Republic, Israel, Denmark, Sweden, Switzerland, Corsica) and released independent albums containing Bulgarian folklore and church songs: “Historical and Renaissance songs”, “Bulgarian Diaphonic Singing”, “Thou Art Blessed, Lord”, “Christmas Blessing”. The duo's project, “The Mystery of the Ritual”, released in 2012, includes ritual folklore songs from the Bulgarian festival-ritual cycle. In 2011 Daniel Spassov and Milen Ivanov along with „The Mystery of Bulgarian Voices" made records in BBC Radio, London. In 2012 "Dvuglas" and the Eva Quartet performed in the Berliner Philharmonie under the theme "Music from the Monasteries".

== Svetoglas ==
Along with Daniel Spassov, Stanimir Ivanov and Viktor Tomanov, Milen Ivanov sings in the male folklore formation Svetoglas, and in the vocal formation "Voices from Infinity". The first musical project of Svetoglas was called "The Wheel of Life". In April 2013, the Svetoglas quartet made a month-long tour in Russia. In July, the same year, Svetoglas receive a special invitation to take part in the festival "Music of faith" in Kazan; and in September 2013, they took part in the „Thracian Gold from Bulgaria – the Legend Comes to Life" exhibition's opening ceremony in the State Historical Museum in Moscow. In February 2014, the singers gave a concert in the European commission's building in Brussels. The formation participated in the Brass band international festival in Drammen, Norway; the Church music festival „Maestro de la Roza" in Oviedo, Spain; the international music festival in Cartagena (Colombia); the "Three cultures" festival in Murcia, Spain; the international church music festival „Fausto Flamini" in Rome, Italy; the "Earth music" festival in Ceriana, Italy and in a concert in the "Juan March" Foundation's prestigious hall in Madrid, Spain.

== Discography ==
=== Milen Ivanov & Eva Quartet ===
- 2000 – Bulgarian folklore gifts
- 2001 – The Bell
- 2001 – Spiritus / PolyGram records
- 2002 – Harmonies
- 2011 – The arch

=== Daniel Spassov and Milen Ivanov ===
- 2003 – Historical and Renaissance songs
- 2005 – Bulgarian Diaphonic Singing
- 2008 – Thou Art Blessed, Lord
- 2012 – The Mystery of the Ritual
- 2012 – Christmas Blessing
- 2016 – Bulgaria's eternal songs

=== Svetoglas ===
- 2012 – The Wheel of Life
- 2016 – Molenie Gospodne

=== Parts in albums of The Mystery of Bulgarian Voices ===
- 2006 – The Mystery of Bulgarian Voices
- 2008 – Golden Collection
