= Nadka Karadzhova =

Bulgarian folk singer

Nadka Karadjova Надка Караджова
- Born: March 14, 1937; Trivodici, Kingdom of Bulgaria
- Died: January 3, 2011 (aged 73) Sofia, Bulgaria
- Genres: Folk
- Instrument: Singing
- Years active: 1953–2011
- Label: Balkanton

Nadka Karadzhova (Bulgarian: Надка Караджова; 1937 – 2011) was one of Bulgaria's most noted folk singers and the first to become internationally known. She was born in Tri Voditsi in the region of Pazardzhik in 1937 into a family of singers.

In 1953, at only 16 years of age, Nadka Karadzhouva joined the State Ensemble under the direction of Filip Kutev. She remained a soloist with the ensemble for 40 years, performing across Europe, Asia, and America.

Her most noted hit was Zablelyalo mi aguntze (A Lambkin has commenced bleating) which in 1979 became a UK hit. On receiving news of her death Tsetska Tsacheva, the President of the Bulgarian National Assembly, wrote a condolatory address:

The talent of Nadka Karadzhova to create beauty with her voice was unparalleled. She not only won the major national awards, but also many prestigious international ones. With her memorable performances she uncovered to the world the immense beauty of the Bulgarian folklore.
