= Sub Zero Farm =

Bulgarian band

Background information
- Origin: Sofia, Bulgaria
- Genres: Punk, funk, metal
- Years active: 2008 – Present
- Members: Georgi Borisov (bass, vocals); Simeon Stoilov (guitar); Elenko Petrov (drums); Plamen Bairaktarski (guitar)
- Past members: Kiril Zafirov (trombone); Todor Bakurjiev (trumpet)
- Website: Official Site

Sub Zero Farm is a Bulgarian punk rock band.

The band was formed in 2008 by bass guitarist Georgi Borisov, known around Bulgaria for musical acts such as Kaya and Shadow Box. The name of the band is rumoured to have come from a friend of Borisov who at the time was working for The Pentagon and suggested the group be named after one of their top secret projects as to reflect Borisov's rebellious nature and anti-establishment views.

With their unique and energetic style, which merges punk and funk with local musical elements, the band gained traction shortly after its formation and began booking live performances at popular night spots such as Swingin' Hall in downtown Sofia. By 2010, they had performed live on the Bulgarian National Radio, the Spirit of Burgas, and the Thessaloniki Anti-racism Festival in Greece.

== Discography ==
Demo Sessions (2009)
Massacre in the Swamp (in progress)
