= Svetoglas =

Bulgarian ancestral polyphonic vocal band

Svetoglas - The Mystery of Bulgarian Polyphony is the first Bulgarian male voice formation for ancestral polyphonic music.

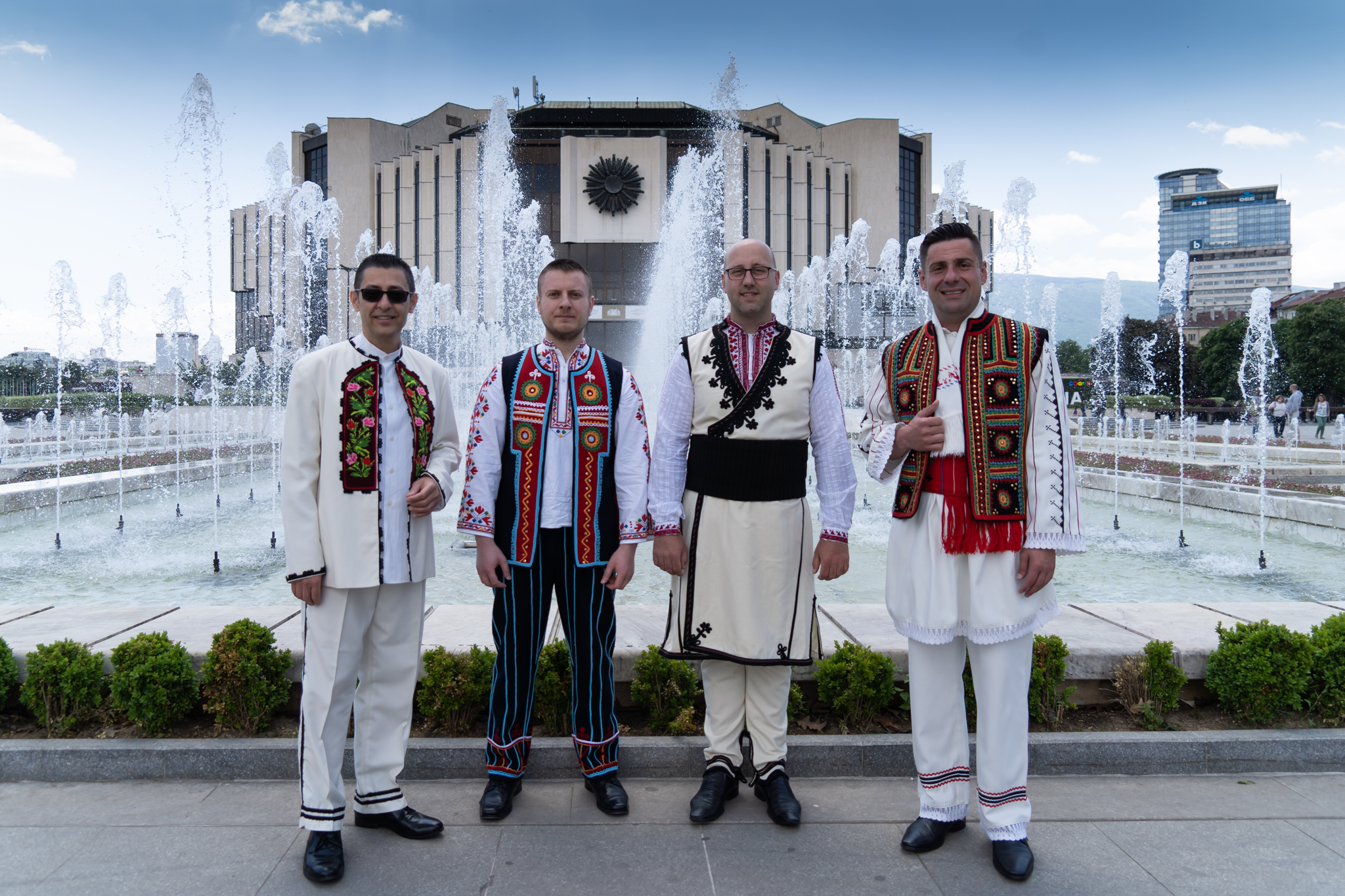
Svetoglas - The Mystery of Bulgarian Polyphony©

== History ==
The ensemble was founded in 2009 by Daniel Spassov and Milen E. Ivanov (Soloists in the Le Mystère des Voix Bulgares) from the idea of an evocation of polyphonic sacred music and Bulgarian folklore. The formation lists also the young folk artists Stanimir Ivanov and Viktor Tomanov.

In 2012 Svetoglas released their first musical project called "The Wheel of Life" which presents, in chronological order, Traditional music and Bulgarian Orthodox Church hymns on birth, life, death and the afterlife. The project is implemented with the support of Municipality of Sofia.

Svetoglas has also realized several recordings of ancient ecclesiastical chants for the second independent project "Ancient Orthodox Hymns". In 2019, the third solo album of the quartet "Nightingale Song" is released, which includes mostly concert recordings!

== Concert performances and tours ==
The formation has made a number of international tours as well as participated in the international Festival "Music of Faith" in Kazan, Russia; IX Slavic Forum of Arts "Golden Knight" in Stavropol, Russia; the Festival of Spiritual Music in Drammen, Norway; the Festival of Sacred Music "Maestro de la Roza" in Oviedo, Spain; the International Music Festival in Cartagena, Colombia; 16 International Tolerance Festival "Murcia – three cultures", Spain; at the International Festival for Sacred Music "Fausto Flamini" in "Saint Mary Aracoeli" Basilica in Rome, Italy; Fundacion "Juan March" in Madrid, Spain; Iron Church in Istanbul, Turkey; Budapest, Hungary; Linz, Austria, and Early music festival Stockholm, Sweden.

== Discography ==
- 2012 The Wheel of Life
- 2016 Molenie Gospodne
- 2019 Nightingale Song
