= Iliya Argirov =

Bulgarian musician

Iliya Argirov (Bulgarian: Илия Аргиров) (March 19, 1931 – November 17, 2012) was a prominent Bulgarian folk singer from the Macedonian folklore region and one of the symbols of the Bulgarian folklore music.

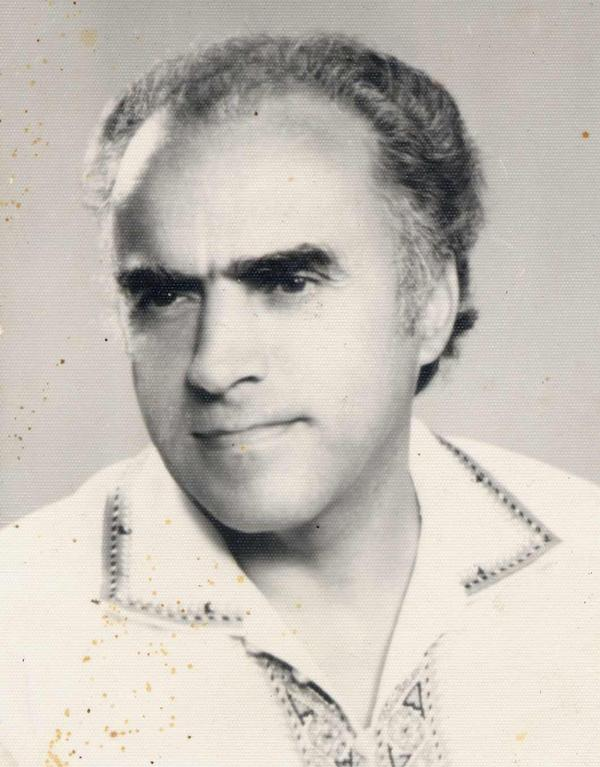
Iliya Argirov (Илия Аргиров) in 1976.

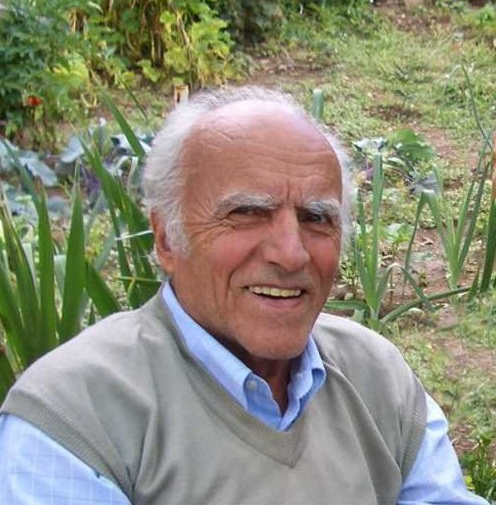
Iliya Argirov (Илия Аргиров) in 2009.

== Biography ==
The first appearances of Iliya Argirov were as a young performer of popular songs from Pirin region. Since 1950 he had been on the professional folklore music scene in the Macedonian songs Ensemble "Gotse Delchev". Later he became the soloist of the State Ensemble for Folk Songs and Dances "Pirin" in Blagoevgrad, where he worked for 35 years and participated in concerts in over 50 countries worldwide. During his 50-year career Iliya Argirov recorded more than 200 songs, 7 albums and numerous participations in compilations of Bulgarian folklore music. He died at the age of 80 in Sofia, November 17, 2012.

== Discography ==
=== Solo albums ===
- 1969 – Popular songs performed by Iliya Argirov / Hародни песни в изпълнение на Илия Аргиров (Published by Balkanton BHA 1151) LP
- 1978 – Iliya Argirov / Илия Аргиров (Published by Balkanton) LP
- 1981 – 30 years with the songs of Iliya Argirov / 30 години с песните на Илия Аргиров (Published by Balkanton BHA 10776) LP
- 1985 – Iliya Argirov / Илия Аргиров (Published by Balkanton BNA 11632) LP
- 1994 – Oi, Devoiche / Ой, девойче (Published by Star Records) LP
- 1995 – I sing for you mother / За тебе пея майко (Published by Bofirov Music) LP
- 2009 – My Songs / Моите песни (Published by Double D Music) LP
- 2014 – Bulgarian folklore songs 2 / Български фолклорни песни 2 (Published by Balkanton) LP

=== As a participant ===
- Year unknown – HOPO!(Volume II) Bulgarian – Macedonian folk songs and dances (Published by Festival Records – Australia) LP
- 1962 – Popular songs (Compilation) / Народни песни (Сборник) (Published by Balkanton BNA 444) LP
- 1971 – State Ensemble for Folk Songs and Dances "Pirin" / Държавен ансамбъл за народни песни и танци "Пирин" – Ансамбъл Пирин (Published by Balkanton BHA 1321) LP
- 1973 – Popoularni Narodni Pesni, Hora i Ruchenitsi / "Популарни Народни Песни, Хора и Ръченици" (Published by Balkanton BHA 1738) LP
- 1975 – Folksongs of the Pirin Region / Пирински народни песни (Published by Balkanton) LP
- 1979 – State Ensemble for Folk Songs and Dances "Pirin" – Alive like the Homeland / Жива като земята (Published by Balkanton BHA 10352) LP
- 1979 – State Ensemble for Folk Songs and Dances "Pirin" – Voices from the Pirin Mountains / Гласове от Пирина (Published by Balkanton BHA 10353) LP
- 1979 – State Ensemble for Folk Songs and Dances "Pirin" – From the pure sources / От чистите извори (Published by Balkanton BHA 10351) LP
- 1984 – State Ensemble for Folk Songs and Dances "Pirin" – Eulogy / – Възпев (Published by Balkanton BHA 11394 ) LP
- 1987 – State Ensemble for Folk Songs and Dances "Pirin" – With the songs of Kiril Stefanov / С песните на Кирил Стефанов (Published by Balkanton BHA 11978/79) LP
- 1998 – Bulgarian Folk Dances, Vol. 2 – Various Artists (Published by Balkanton) LP
- 2000 – The Magic of Bulgarian Folk Music, Vol.1 – Various Artists (Published by Balkanton) LP
- 2002 – Macedonian Songs / Македонски песни (Published by Balkanton) LP
- 2004 – The voices of Bulgaria Pt.2 / Гласовете на България – 2 част (Published by Stefkos Music) LP
- 2005 – Bulgarian Folk Heritage / Българско фолклорно наследство (Published by Gega New Ltd.) LP
- 2007 – The Best Macedonian Songs of Bulgaria / Най-добрите македонски песни на България (Published by Star Records) LP
- 2010 – Pirin Folk Songs – Various Artists (Published by Gega New Ltd.) LP
- 2012 – Golden Treasure: Folk Songs arranged by Bulgarian Composers, Vol. 2 (Published by Bulgarian National Radio) LP
- 2012 – Shopski Narodni Pesni, Vol. 3 / Шопски народни песни 3 част (Published by Bulgarian National Radio) LP

=== Guest appearances ===
- 1982 – Folk Songs and Horo Dances Arranged by Kosta Kolev / Народни песни и хора – обработил Коста Колев (Published by Balkanton BHA 10822) LP
- 1986 – Stefan Kunev – Favorite Folk Songs & Horos / Стефан Кънев – Любими народни песни и хора (Published by Balkanton BHA 11875) LP
- 1986 – Alexander Kokareshkov – Pirin folk songs / Пирински песни (Published by Balkanton BHA 11786/7) LP
- 1999 – Macedonian Folk Tunes / Македонски фолклорни напеви – Album shared with Liyuben & Vessela Bojkovi (Published by Unison) LP
- 2009 – The songs of my father / Песните на Баща ми – Guest in the album of Dimitar Argirov (Published by Double D Music) LP

== Personal life ==
Iliya Argirov has a son, Dimitar Argirov, who is known as the first singer of rock/metal band Epizod as well as a folklore singer performing the songs from the repertoire of his father.

== See also ==
- Bulgarian music
- Pirin Folk Ensemble
- Dimitar Argirov
