= Mezhdu denya i noshtta =

Video by Balkandji
- Released: 2006
- Genre: Folk metal

Mezhdu denya i noshtta (Bulgarian: Между деня и нощта, pronounced [mɛʒˈdu ˈdɛɲɐ i noʃtˈta]) is the first video release by Balkandji. It contains four video clips by the band and a recording of their performance on the 2003 festival "Slantse/Luna" in Trigrad. It also contains an information about the band members, a gallery of pictures and an interview with the band. The interview and the information are in Bulgarian.

The name in English means "Between day and night".

It is freely distributed under the Creative Commons Attribution Licence.

== Track listing ==
=== Video clips ===
- Krali Marko
- Az tebe, libe, sum zaljubil
- Oy, mari, Yano!
- Zvezdica

=== "Slantse/Luna" performance ===
1. Libe
2. Oy, mari, Yano!
3. Pogled
4. Burya
5. Kam taz zemya
6. Narod

== Notes ==
1. DVD download.
