= U.Z.Z.U. =

Bulgarian punk rock band

U.Z.Z.U
- Origin: Gabrovo, Bulgaria
- Genres: Punk rock
- Years active: 1988 – 1992
- Labels: AON / Break Even Records
- Members: Hristo Panev (bass); Mariana (vocals)

U.Z.Z.U. (Bulgarian: У.З.З.У.) were a Bulgarian punk rock band.

== History ==
Founded by bassist Hristo Panev in 1988 and featuring a rare female lead singer, the band is known as one of the pioneers among Bulgarian punk outfits in spite of their short existence, during which they recorded just one album.

U.Z.Z.U. gained popularity after successful stage performances in the early 1990s and were noticed by renowned British disc jockey John Peel, who played their tapes on BBC Radio.

After being featured in two various artists compilations in the late 1990s, in 2000 U.Z.Z.U released their own album, There Is No Future (Няма Бъдеще; Nyama Budeshte), comprising the band's recordings from 1988 to 1991.

== Discography ==
Greetings From Bulgaria (1997)
Bulgarian Archives 1983-1990 (1999)
Nyama Budeshte 1988-1991 (2000)
