= Black and White (EP) =

Black And White

EP by Dimmi Argus
- Released: 6 April 2010
- Recorded: August–December 2009 at Double D Studio, Sofia, Bulgaria
- Genre: Heavy metal, melodic metal
- Length: 21:18
- Label: Double D Music
- Producer: Dimitar Argirov

Dimmi Argus chronology
Black And White (2010)	Bad Dream (2012)

Black and White is the first EP by Italian melodic metal band Dimmi Argus. It was released on 6 April 2010 and produced by Dimitar Argirov.

== Track listing ==
1. My Way Home (Demo Version) 4:43
  - (Music written by Dimitar Argirov & Dragomir Draganov, Lyrics written by Dimitar Argirov)
2. Black And White (Long Version) 6:35
  - (Music & Lyrics written by Dimitar Argirov)
3. HO HE TAKABA (Bulgarian Version) 4:59
  - (Music & Lyrics written by Dimitar Argirov)
4. HO HE TAKABA (Instrumental Mix) 4:59
  - (Music written by Dimitar Argirov)

== Personnel ==
- Dimmi Argus – Vocals, Producer
- Dragomir Draganov – Guitars, Keyboards, Mixing & Mastering
