= Probuzhdane =

Studio album by Balkandji
- Released: 2001
- Recorded
- Genre: Folk metal
- Length: 37:11
- Label: Not on Label; self-released
- Producer: Kiril Yanev

Balkandji chronology
Probuzhdane (2001)	Zvezdica (2004)

Probuzhdane (written Пробуждане in Bulgarian) is the first self-released album by Balkandji. The name means "Awakening" and the band translates it to "Awake". "Probujdane" is also used for a transliteration of the name into English.

It is freely distributed under the Creative Commons Attribution Licence.

Samodiva

Diavolska shterka

== Track listing ==
Track number	Transliterated name	Original name	English Translation
1	Zora	Зора	“Dawn”
2	Libe	Либе	Archaic word for “Sweetheart”
3	Krali Marko	Крали Марко	The Bulgarian name of a legendary Serbian king, Prince Marko
4	Samodiva	Самодива	A Slavic fairy maiden, dancing in the forest at nights, luring young men.
5	Kam taz zemia	Към таз земя	“To This Land”
6	Diavolska shterka	Дяволска щерка	“Devil's Daughter”
7	Molia te	Моля те	“I'm begging you”
8	Shte ostana tuk	Ще остана тук	“I will stay here”
9	Zdrach	Здрач	“Twilight”
10	Kukeri	Кукери	The participants in a traditional Bulgarian ritual to scare evil spirits away.

== Personnel ==
- Nikolay Barovsky (Николай Баровски) – Keyboards, kaval, vocals
- Vladimir Leviev (Владимир Левиев) – Bass, vocals
- Kiril Yanev (Кирил Янев) – Vocals, guitar
- Alexander Stoyanov (Александър Стоянов) – drums, vocals, programming, percussions
- Lyudmila Barovska (Людмила Баровска) – Bass flugelhorn on Track 3
- Dimitar Vasilev (Димитър Василев) – Bass flugelhorn on Track 3
- Albena Velikova (Албена Великова) – Vocals on Track 4
- Spas Dimitrov (Спас Димитров) – Bass on Track 1 and vocals on Track 1, 2 and 8
- Inna Zamfirova (Инна Замфирова) – Vocals on Track 1 and 7
- Mihail Kalachev (Михаил Калъчев) – Flute on Track 3
- Kristina Morozova (Кристина Морозова) – Vocals on Track 2
- Boris Tassev (Борис Тасев) – Trombone on Track 3
- Raya Hadzhieva (Рая Хаджиева) – Trumpet on Track 3
