= Balkandji =

Folk metal band from Bulgaria

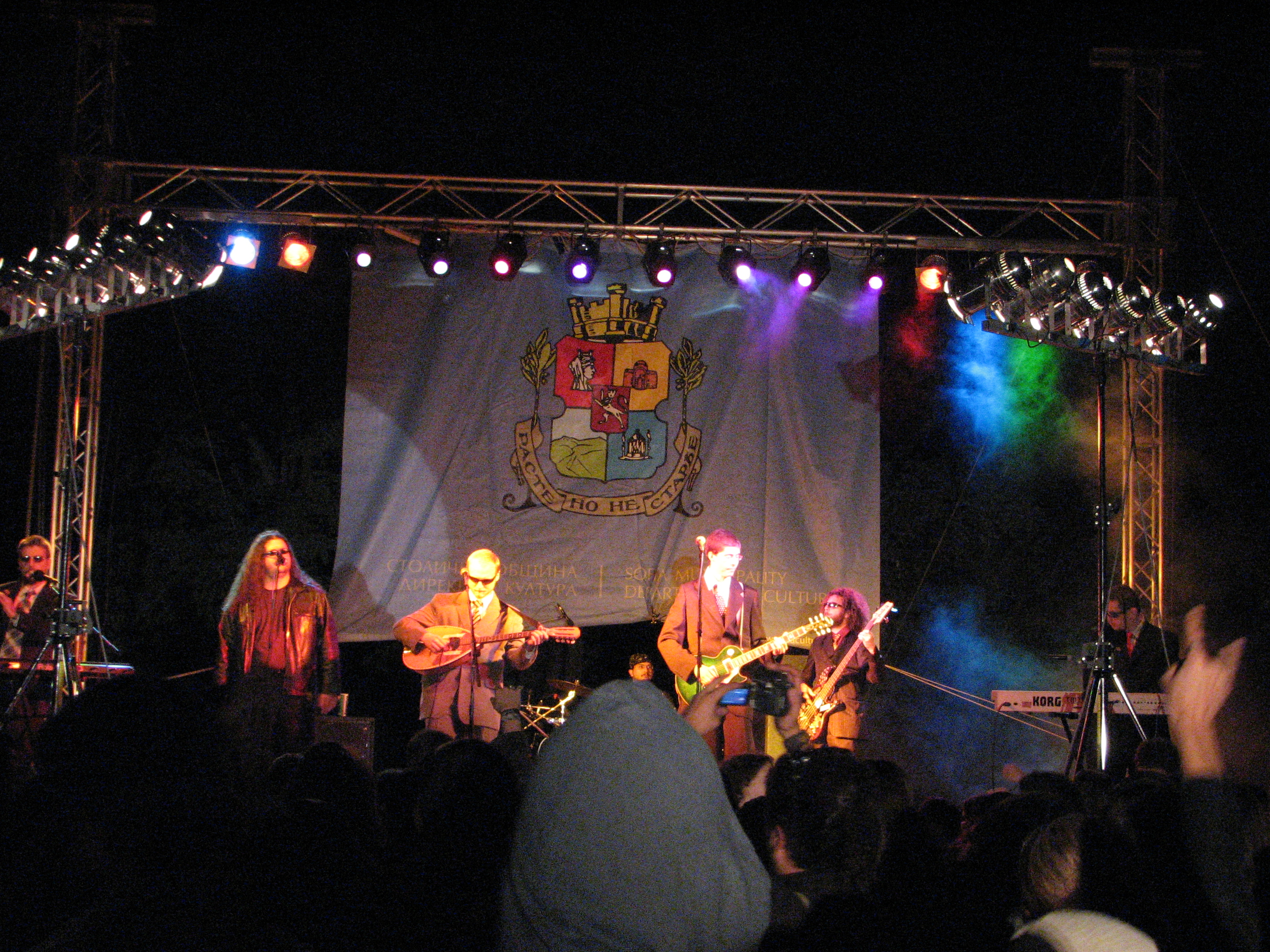
- Balkandji on the "Gradat I Az" Festival, in Sofia, Bulgaria (2007).

Background information
- Origin: Sofia, Bulgaria
- Genres: Folk rock, folk metal, progressive rock, progressive metal, heavy metal
- Years active: 1999–present
- Labels: Balkandji
- Members: Kiril Yanev; Nikolay Barovski; Vladimir Leviev; Alexander Stoyanov; Raya Hadjieva
- Past members: Inna Zanfirova; Spas Dimitrov; Nikolay Traykov; Hristo Pashov; Kalin Hristov Katsko; Yavor Pachovski; Valentin Monovski; Teodora Todorova; Yana Shishkova
- Website: www.balkandji.com

Balkandji is a folk metal band from Bulgaria. They freely mix traditional Bulgarian music with hard rock and heavy metal. As Bulgarian folk music is very complex, in Balkandji songs odd time signatures and constant time signature changing are very common. They create a characteristic blend of melodies taken from the Bulgarian folklore with heavy guitar riffs.

The lyrical themes are also borrowed from the Bulgarian folklore. Their lyrics are mainly about love, the loved one, magic and the love of the native land. All of the songs draw a beautiful lyrical picture that can be very touching. They are mainly written in Bulgarian. It's impossible to represent the spirit of the songs in a foreign language. They use the poetics and the vocal melodies and harmonies that are typical for the traditional music. Archaic words that are now rarely used are not uncommon.

Besides guitars, keyboards and drums Balkandji use traditional Bulgarian instruments, such as tambura, kaval and tǔpan.

== The name ==
The general meaning of the word Balkandji (spelled Балканджи in Bulgarian) is “a man of the Balkans”. As the Stara Planina mountain range used to be called “The Balkan” in Bulgaria, it also means “a man from the mountains”, mainly referring to the revolutionaries and people who were hiding in Stara Planina while Bulgaria was under the rule of the Ottoman Empire, hence a brave and patriotic young man.

== Biography ==
Songs from Probuzhdane:

Samodiva

Diavolska shterka

Rock band Balkandji was formed in 1999 by Kiril Yanev on guitar and Nikolay Barovsky on keyboards. At that time they were playing together with Alexander Stoyanov in the brass band of the First English Language School, Sofia. They used to play a lot of folk pieces with the brass band, which gave Barovsky the idea to try to introduce some folklore motives in their music. After a lot of experimentation, a distinctive style emerged from the band which mixed folk music, rock and other musical styles.

Balkandji's first song was called "Az tebe, libe, sum zaljubil". It was written to lyrics by the poet Konstantin Nikolov, who invited Balkandji to write the music for his poetry. They entered Horizont – Spring 2000, a national radio contest, with this song. Meanwhile, they also wrote the music to "Vyatura" (The Wind) and "Stariya prizrak" (The Old Ghost) with which Yanev's 9-year-old sister participated in the Parad na detskata pesen children's song contest. The songs won first and second place.

Alexander Stoyanov, on drums, and Vladimir Leviev, on bass, joined Balkandji to work on their debut album. In the spring of 2001, they again participated in national radio contest with the song "Krali Marko", which won first place. The same year, their song "Kam taz zemia" won second place in the "My Reason To Stay in Bulgaria" contest. That autumn, a side-project of the band, which again incorporated folklore elements, won a contest for electronic music.

In November Balkandji was joined by the opera singer Inna Zamfirova. Meanwhile, the demo recording of the album Probujdane was completed. Their first live performance soon followed, featuring Spas Dimitrov on guitar, Nikolay Trajkov on drums and Hristo Pashov on bass. Stoyanov and Leviev were students abroad at that time. In 2002 the band decided to record and release the album by themselves, because of the lack of interest from musical labels. Since then Balkadji has staged many live performances, and in 2003 became part of the regular program of certain nightclubs such as O!Shipka.

In 2003 the band wrote the song "Oi, mari, Yano", which was included in a compilation produced by the club, O!Shipka, and Toxity Records. At this time the band began working on their second album. In 2004 they released the single "Zvezdica".

== Live performances ==
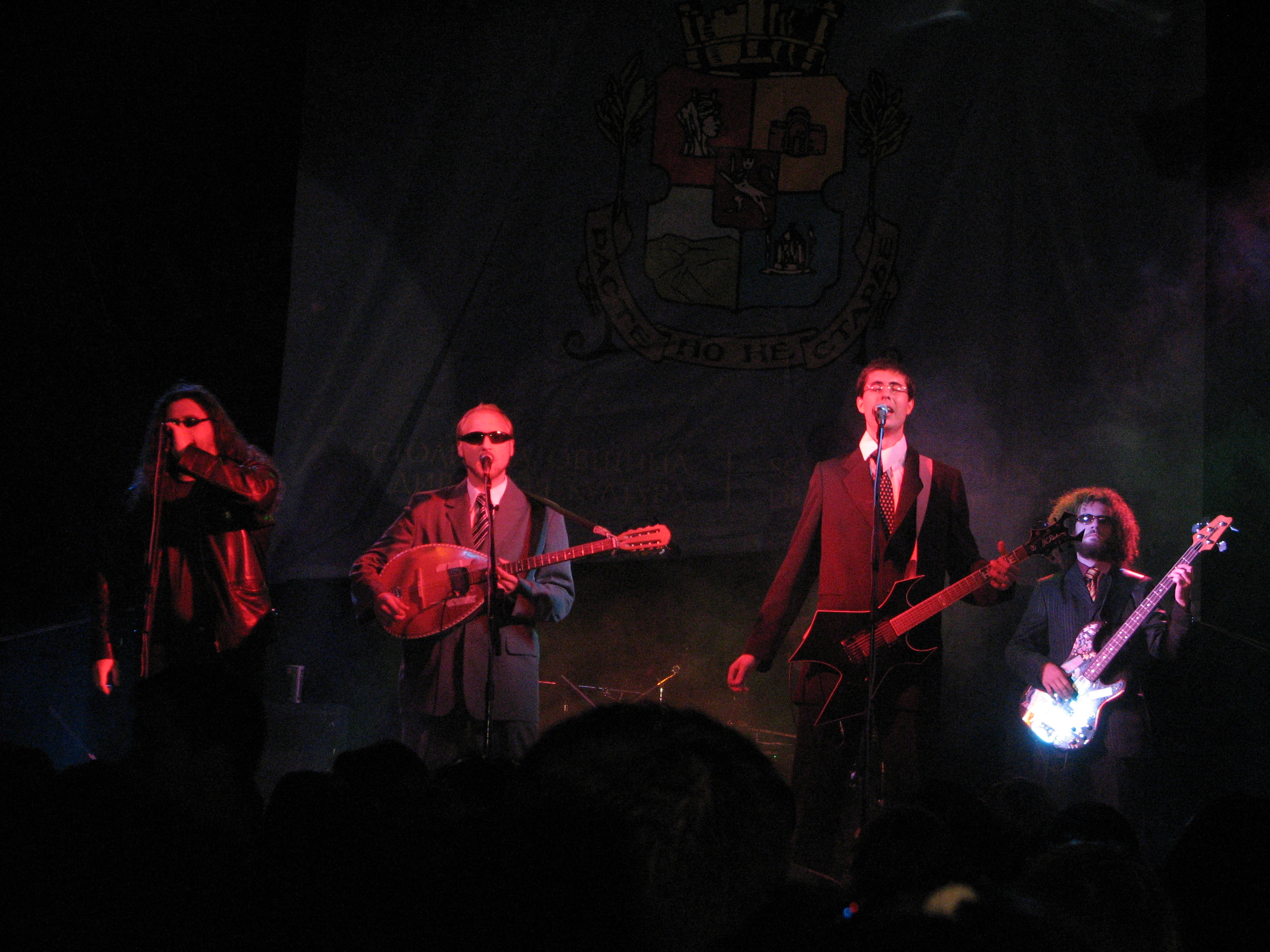
Spas Dimitrov, Valentin Monovski, Kiril Yanev and Vladimir Leviev in concert

Balkandji concerts are well attended by people attracted to the band's style and ideas. The band tends to improvise a lot on their old songs, some of them being played quite differently from the original album versions. They also play many unreleased songs from forthcoming albums at their live performances.

== Barovsky arrest ==
On 22 September 2004 Barovsky was arrested in Greece. Counterfeit foreign money was found in the luggage he was carrying. The band continued their tour, however, using Iavor Pachovski as a temporary replacement keyboardist. Barovsky was held in prison until the trial on 11 January 2006, when he was acquitted. Barovsky returned to the band in early 2006 although he had not played the keyboards for more than a year.

== Band members ==
- Kiril Yanev (Кирил Янев) – vocals, guitar
- Nikolay Barovsky (Николай Баровски) – keyboards, kaval
- Alexander Stoyanov (Александър Стоянов) – drums
- Vladimir Leviev (Владимир Левиев) – bass
- Spas Dimitrov (Спас Димитров) – acoustic guitar, tambura, vocals
- Kalin Hristov Katsko (Калин Христов – Кацко) – drums, tǔpan, percussions
- Valentin Monovski (Валентин Моновски) – tambura, vocals, guitar
- Iavor Pachovski (Явор Пачовски) – keyboards
- Tedi Todorova (Теди Тодорова) – trumpet, vocals
- Yana Shishkova-Dimitrova (Яна Шишкова-Димитрова) – vocals
- Raya Hadzhieva (Рая Хаджиева) – trumpet
- Nikolay Trajkov (Николай Трайков) – drums
- Hristo Pashov (Христо Пашов) – bass
- Inna Zamfirova (Инна Замфирова) – vocals

== Discography ==
=== Studio albums ===
- Probuzhdane (Awake) (2001)
- Zmej (2008)

=== EPs ===
- Zvezdica (2004)

=== Videos and DVDs ===
- Mezhdu denya i noshtta (2006)
