= Brothers in Blood =

Bulgarian hardcore punk band

- Origin: Pleven, Bulgaria
- Genres: Hardcore punk
- Years active: 1998 – Present
- Labels: Method Of Groove
- Members: Alexander 'Shutta' Parvanov (vocals); Svetoslav 'Sven' Georgiev (guitar, vox); Daniel 'Danny' Goranov (drums); Youp Boelens(bass, vox)
- Past members: Ceko (guitar Joro (drums); Parj (guitar); Alexander 'Alex' Jordanov (bass)
- Website: Official Page

Brothers in Blood is a Bulgarian Dutch hardcore punk band.

Inspired by groups such as 25 ta Life, to which the band owes its name, Brothers in Blood was formed in 1998 by former members of recently disbanded hardcore outfit Pool Punishers. After their hastily recorded demo sessions became a favorite of the local hardcore audience, the band gained more popularity and eventually got in touch with the New York City-based label Method Of Groove owned by Joey Z (Life Of Agony, Carnivore). In early 2012 Joey Z joined the band in the studio to produce their EP "As Time Goes By...".

Over the years Brothers In Blood have toured occasionally around Europe. They have shared stages with bands such as Ignite, Biohazard, Merauder, and D.R.I., Slpashot and many more. The band is well known in Holland where their guitar player Sven has residesd for years.

The song "Don't Say My Name" from their first CD "Take Your Life Back" features Zoli of Ignite on guest vocals.

Most of the band members have and still are participating in other music projects such as Get Some!, Vendetta, Piranha, Alien Industry, S.I.M.B. & more

In 2015 the band was seen working on new material which eventually resulted in their split CD Victory Speech with the Brazilian hardcore classics Questions

== Discography ==
Pleven Hardcore Demo (1998)
Take Your Life Back (2008)
As Time Goes By... (2012)
There Will Be Blood (2015)
