= Radio Edits (EP) =

EP by Dimmi Argus
- Released: July 18, 2014
- Recorded: 2011–2012 at Tanzan Music, Lodi, Italy and Music Manor Studio.
- Genre: Heavy metal, melodic metal
- Length: 30:17
- Label: Tanzan Music
- Producer: Dimitar Argirov

Dimmi Argus chronology
| Bad Dream (2013) | Radio Edits (2014) |

Radio Edits is the second EP of the Italian melodic metal band Dimmi Argus. The EP contains 7 songs from the previous full-length album of the band Bad Dream.

== Track listing ==
1. Black And White (EP radio edit) 4:43
2. From the grave (radio edit) 4:32
3. Wish I Could (radio edit) 4:21
4. My Way Home (radio edit) 3:54
5. Bad Dream (alternative guitar solo) 3:47
6. From the grave (alternative radio edit) 4:00
7. This Silence (instrumental mix) 5:00

== Personnel ==
- Dimmi Argus – vocals, backing vocals, keyboards
- Matteo Calza – guitars, backing vocals
- Filippo Spezia – bass, backing vocals
- Andrea Cassinari – drums

== Production ==
- Daniele Mandelli – mixing
- Timo Tolkki – mastering
