= Novi Tsvetya =

Bulgarian punk rock band

Novi Tsvetya (Нови Цветя)
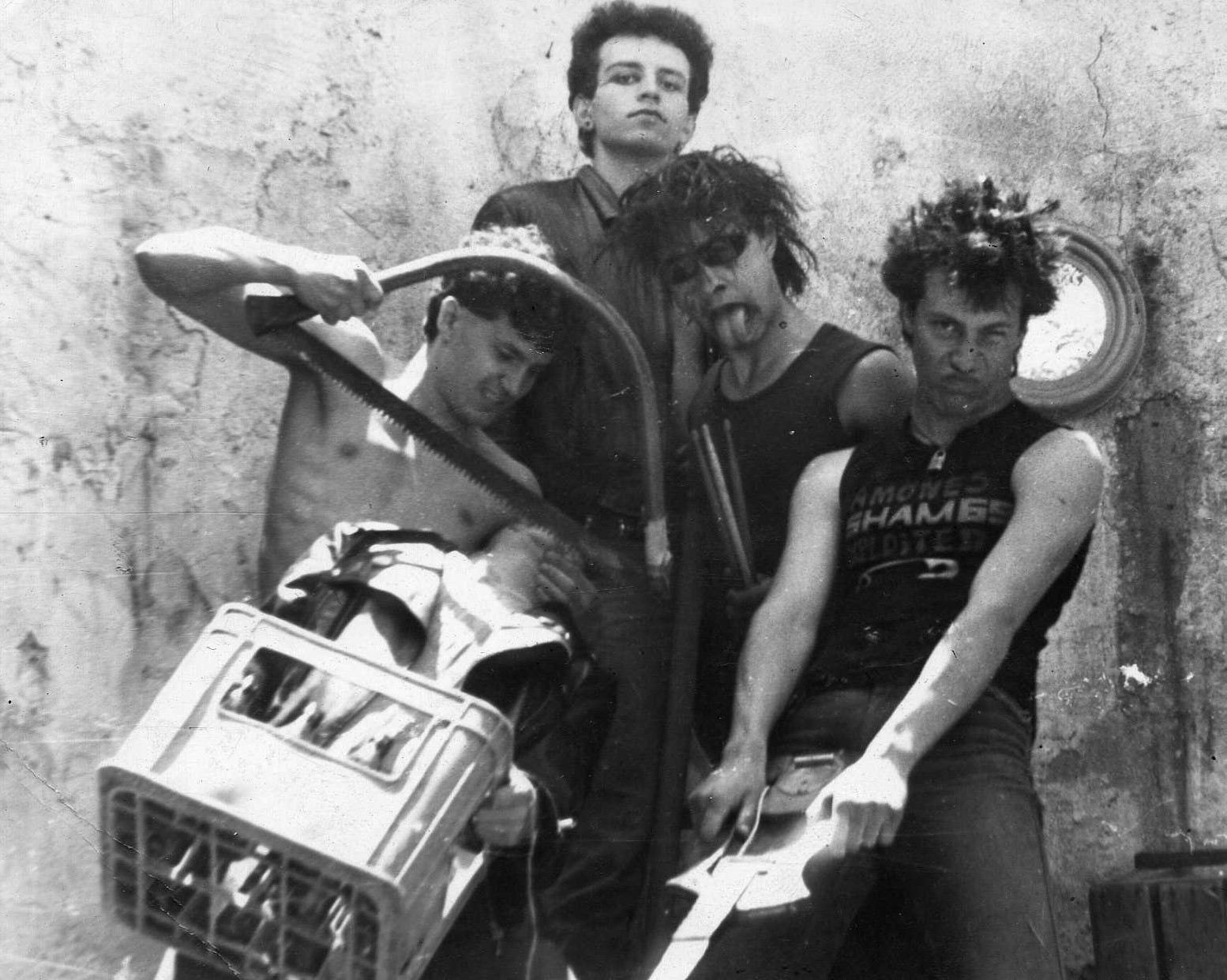
- Novi Tsvetya in 1983

Background information
- Origin: Kyustendil, Bulgaria
- Genres: Punk rock
- Years active: 1979–present
- Labels: Aon Productions
- Members: Angel Pavlov (drums, vocals); Krasimir Baraklyiski (vocals); Ivan Popov (guitar, vocals); Valeri Stoichkov (bass guitar, vocals)
- Website: Official Page

Novi Tsvetya (Нови Цветя) is a Bulgarian punk rock band. Formed in 1979, they are considered the first punk rock group to emerge from Bulgaria. Growing up in Kyustendil, a town near the Macedonian and Serbian border, the future band members listened to and were influenced by punk playing on Yugoslavian radio, which ultimately led them to forming their own outfit.

Inspired by bands such as Slade and Bijelo Dugme, Novi Tsvetya spent their first years underground due to the censorship imposed by the communist government and didn't make an official appearance on stage until 1990. Their first album, a compilation, was released in 2004 and comprises all their recordings from the band's formation until 1995.

== Discography ==
Radiacia: Punk Rock Made in Bulgaria 1979-1995 (2004)
Zemen Rai (2007)
Punk For Global Chaos...In 2010 (2010)
