= Dimmi Argus =

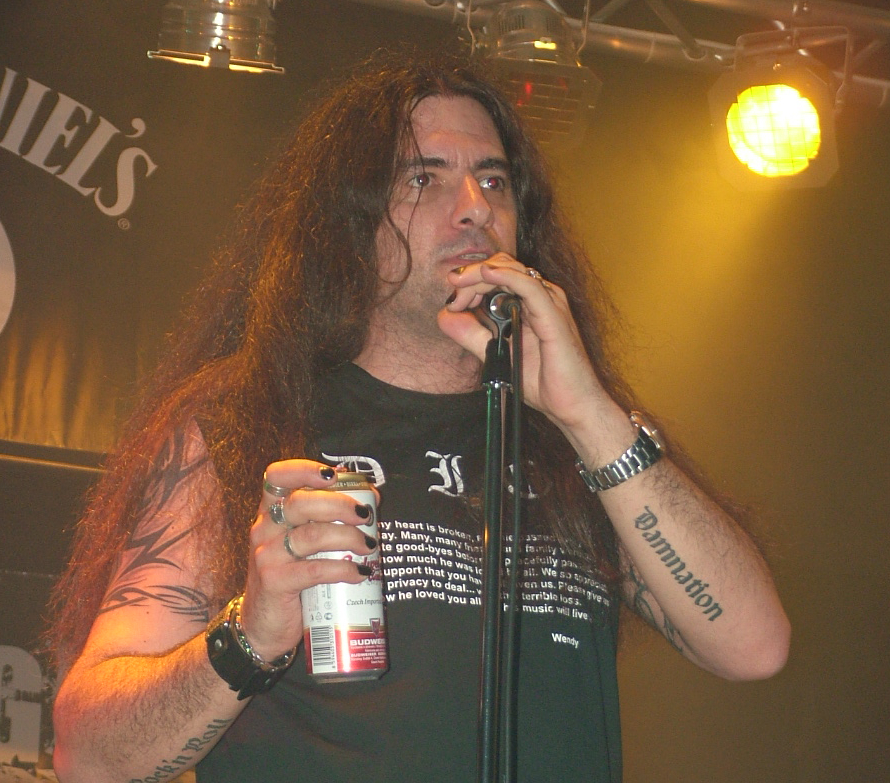

Background information
- Genres: Heavy metal, folk metal, hard rock
- Years active: Since 2007
- Labels: Double D Music, Tanzan Music, FreeMood Promotion, DIMMI ARGUS, KVZ Music
- Members: Dimmi Argus; Matteo Calza; Filippo Spezia; Andrea Cassinari

Dimmi Argus is heavy metal band, created in 2007 by Dimmi Argus (birth name Dimitar Argirov), a Bulgarian singer, songwriter and producer, known for being the lead singer of the Bulgarian rock band Epizod. He is the son of the famous Bulgarian folklore singer Iliya Argirov and influenced by his father performs the songs from his folklore repertoire as well. In the beginning this is a solo project. First EP and DVD was recorded in Bulgaria. Later members of Italian band Loghart joined to band.

== Members ==
- Dimmi Argus – vocals, keyboards
- Filippo Spezia – bass
- Matteo Calza – lead guitar
- Andrea Cassinari – drums

== Former members ==
- Simone Cordani – lead guitar

== Guest musicians ==
- Dragomir Draganov – lead guitar
- Plamen Uzunov – lead guitar
- Graziano "Il Conte" Demurtas – lead guitar
- Stoian Petrov – drums

== Discography ==
Studio albums

- 2013 – Bad Dream (LP)

Extended plays

- 2010 – Black And White
- 2014 – Radio Edits

Video albums

- 2011 – Live at the Rock Bar Fans (Live DVD)

Singles

- 2012 – Wish I Could (Single)
- 2014 – Devoyko Mari Hubava (Single)
- 2016 – I Know Your Secrets (Single Edit) (Single)
- 2018 – Ne moga da se spra! (Single Edit) (Single)
