= Daniel Spassov =

Bulgarian singer

Daniel Spassov (Bulgarian: Даниел Спасов), is a Bulgarian singer, performer of Bulgarian folklore songs and church music.

== Biography ==
Daniel Spassov studied law at Sofia University (St. Kliment Ohridski) and received a Master's degree in Musical Folklore at New Bulgarian University.

The artistic biography of Daniel Spassov includes more than 250 recordings of folk music for Bulgarian National Radio, movies made for Bulgarian National Television, and four single CDs.

He is an editor for Bulgarian National Television and host of the TV folklore show "Goes our music". Over the years Daniel Spassov has been an author and presenter of the "News by notes", "Whistled and sang", "Word by word" at the folklore festival in Koprivshtitsa. Also, he has made many portraits and some documentary movies for famous Bulgarian folklore musicians.

== Solo projects ==
He has taken part in many concerts across Bulgaria, in solo concerts as well as a soloist of the world-famous choir The Mystery of Bulgarian Voices. He has performed in more than thirty countries, in some of the most prestigious concert halls in Europe, Asia and America : „Royal festival Hall", „Barbican center", „Queen Elizabeth" – London, „Kennedy Center" – Washington, „Konzerthaus" – Vienna, „Concertgebouw" – Netherlands, the National opera's hall in Tel Aviv, and in Oman's Royal opera house. In 2000 his performance of the church song "In your realm",( music composed by Dobri Hristov), and two more songs of „The Mystery of Bulgarian Voices" were included in the international bridge "Vaticano greets the World for the 21st century". As a soloist of the choir he performed at the concert in Torino, Italy, in front of the G-7 leaders (the seven most developed countries in the world), at the special ceremony held on the occasion of signing the contract of Bulgaria's Treaty of Accession to the European Union, in Luxembourg, 2005 and in 2002 on the occasion of Pope John Paul II's visit to Bulgaria.

Daniel Spassov`s voice is heard in many documentary films, in TV arts programs that introduce Bulgaria's cultural and historical heritage, including those of the director Stiliyan Ivanov: "Vanga", "The Healer Petar Dimkov". In 2012 he received a special invitation to take part in the International film production "Dervishes - Mystics of the East".

== Projects with other performers ==
Daniel Spassov is renown also for his duets with Milen E. Ivanov ("Dvuglas" formation ("Two voices")) and with Olga Borisova (together they create the "Voices from the infinity" formation, in which sing E. Bojkova, M. Ivanov, K. Stancheva, R. Alexova and V. Kuzov). In 1995 the formation releases a series of albums, called "The voices from the infinity", that includes songs of all Bulgaria folklore regions. From 2011 the formation is composed of the following members – O. Borisova, V. Marinova, D. Spasov, M. Ivanov and S. Ivanov. With Olga Borisova and Ivan Todorov they release the album, composed of old city songs – "Anna's kiss" (1995).

== Projects with Milen Ivanov ==
Since 1998, Spassov has worked with Milen E. Ivanov. Their creative endeavors have been related to Bulgarian two-part singing. They search out and record samples of the most ancient strata of Bulgarian folklore. Often they experiment, superimposing voices, and creating modern music. In 2003 they released their first album with rebel, historical and Renaissance songs and in 2005 they presented the album "Bulgarian Diaphonic Singing". They give many concerts in Bulgaria and solo tours abroad – Austria, Germany, Sweden, Denmark, Czech Republic, Israel, Corsica, Switzerland. In 2008 Spassov and Ivanov released an album with ancient Bulgarian Orthodox Church songs, titled "Thou Art Blessed, Lord". In 2009 they released the album "Christmas Blessing". The duo's project, "The Mystery of the Ritual," released in 2012, included ritual songs of Bulgarian celebrations. In 2011 Daniel Spassov and Milen Ivanov along with "The Mystery of Bulgarian Voices" made recordings in BBC Radio, London. In 2012 together with "Eva Quartet" they gave a concert in Berlin Philharmonic under the motto "Music from the monasteri".

== Svetoglas ==
In 2009 Daniel Spassov, Milen E. Ivanov, Stanimir Ivanov and Victor Tomanov created the male folklore formation Svetoglas. The formation's endeavors are related to the ancient Bulgarian church and folklore music and its contemporary sound. Svetoglas's first musical project was called „The wheel of life". In April, 2013, the Svetoglas Quartet made a one-month tour in Russia, performing in Yekaterinburg, Tolyatti, Perm, Vologda, and Samara. In July, 2013 Svetoglas received a special invitation to take part in the festival "Music of faith" in Kazan, Russia. In September, the same year, the quartet sang at the "Thracian Gold from Bulgaria – the Legends Come to Life" exhibition's opening ceremony at the State Historical Museum in Moscow. In February, 2014 the singers gave a concert in Brussels, in the European Commission's building. The formation has held successful tours to Russia, Great Britain, Norway, Belgium, Spain and Colombia. They took part in the International Liturgical music festival in Drammen, Norway, the church music festival - „Maestro de la Roza" in Oviedo, Spain; the international music festival in Cartagena (Colombia), the "Three cultures" festival in Murcia, Spain; the international church music festival „Fausto Flamini" in Rome; the "Earth music" festival in Ceriana, Italy and in a concert in the "Juan March" Foundation's prestigious hall in Madrid, Spain.

== Recognition and awards ==
In 1994 Daniel Spassov's name was included in the World encyclopedia "Music of the world", published in London. On 24 May 2014, for his contribution to Bulgaria's cultural development, he was awarded with the honourable sign of the Ministry of culture „Golden century" – Simeon The Great's seal.

== Discography ==
Solo albums:

- 1987 – Songs from Belogradchik, single play
- 1990 – Swan wings, single play
- 1992 – Folklore sound and light, long play
- 1994 – On the road of fire – favourite folklore songs
- 1995 – Christmas, my Christmas – Christmas songs from all over Bulgaria
- 1996 – Give me, O, God
- 2000 – Holly Mother's Prayer
- 2001 – Here Comes the Brass Band
- 2008 – Northwest worlds

Daniel Spassov and Milen Ivanov

- 2003 – Historical and Renaissance songs
- 2005 – Bulgarian Diaphonic Singing
- 2008 – Thou Art Blessed, Lord
- 2012 – The Mystery of the Ritual
- 2012 – Christmas Blessing
- 2016 – Bulgaria's eternal songs

Svetoglas

- 2012 – The Wheel of life
- 2016 – Molenie Gospodne

Participation in albums of "The mystery of Bulgarian voices"

- 1994 – Ritual
- 1998 – Le Mystère Des Voix Bulgares – Volume 4
- 2000 – Le Mystère Des Voix Bulgares
- 2006 – Le Mystère Des Voix Bulgares
- 2008 – Golden collection
