= Kaya (Bulgarian band) =

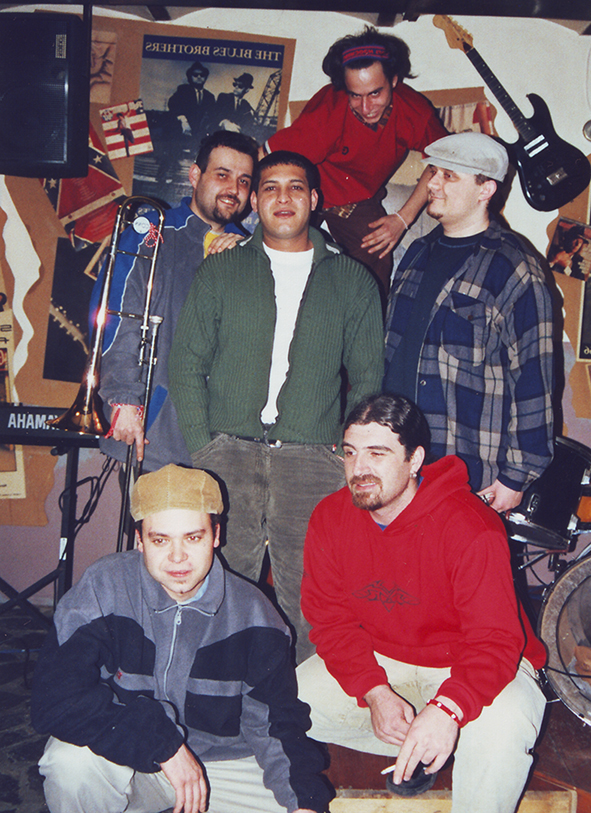
- Kaya in 2004

Background information
- Origin: Sofia, Bulgaria
- Genres: Reggae, ska, funk
- Years active: 1999 – Present
- Labels: Vojd House
- Members: Georgi Borisov (bass, vocals); Mihail Mihailov (drums); Sunkata (guitar); Petio Momchev (sax); Alex Borisov (trombone); Ivan Terziev (synthesizer)

Kaya is a Bulgarian reggae band.

The idea of forming the band was first hatched by bass guitarist Georgi Borisov on the day of the 1999 solar eclipse. At the time, 20-year-old Borisov was wandering among several garage bands who were not responding favorably to his easygoing style, which ultimately led him to form his own group later that year.

Over the coming years, as Kaya went through more than 20 members, all of which contributing to its present style, the band evolved to embrace ska and funk elements as well as ethnic dance-pop, releasing two albums in the process.

After a 10-year hiatus, during which most members became parents, the band reunited in 2021 to take part in Toplofest, a new music, theatre, and circus arts festival in Sofia.

== Discography ==
Demo Sessions (2002)
Legalno (2003)
Live at O'Shipka (2005)
