= Marcel Cellier =

Swiss musician and ethnomusicologist (1925–2013)

- Born: 29 October 1925
- Died: 13 December 2013 (aged 88)
- Label: Disques Cellier (owner)

Marcel Cellier (29 October 1925 – 13 December 2013) was a Swiss organist, ethnomusicologist and music producer, internationally known for introducing the singing of Le Mystère des Voix Bulgares, and the playing of Gheorghe Zamfir.

Cellier was the founder and owner of the "Disques Cellier" recording label. From 1960, and for the next 25 years, he hosted a weekly radio show on "Radio Suisse Romande", which he called "From the Black Sea to the Baltic".

In the 1960s, Cellier extensively researched Romanian folk music, which led to his discovery of Zamfir. In 1984, he was presented with the "Grand prix audiovisuel de l'Europe" from the Académie du disque français in Paris. In 1989, he was presented with a Grammy Award for producing Le Mystère des Voix Bulgares, Vol. II which featured, among others, the Bulgarian State Television Female Vocal Choir.

In 2012, a documentary called Balkan Melodie was made about Cellier's travels in Eastern Europe.

== Discography ==
- Gheorghe Zamfir (1969) LP: Arion France 30 T 073
- La Doina Roumaine (1969) LP/CD: DC 001
- Flûte de Pan et Orgue – Gheorghe Zamfir/Marcel Cellier vol.1 (1970) LP/CD: DC 002
- Flûte de Pan et Orgue – Gheorghe Zamfir/Marcel Cellier vol 2 (1971) LP/CD: DC 003
- Les Virtuoses Roumains vol.1 (1972) LP: DC 004
- Flûte de Pan et Orgue – Gheorghe Zamfir/Marcel Cellier vol.3 (1972) LP/CD: DC 005
- Le Concert des Virtuoses Roumains (1975) LP/CD: DC 006
- Taragot et Orgue – Dumitru Farcas/Marcel Cellier vol. 1 (1975) LP/CD: DC 007
- Le Mystère des Voix Bulgares vol.1 (1975) LP/CD: DC 008
- Appenzeller Zäuerli (Jodel d'Appenzell) (1976) LP/CD: DC 009
- L'Albanie mystérieuse (1976) LP/CD: DC 010
- Le Clarino virtuose de la Grèce (1976) LP: DC 011
- Les Muverans (orchestre champêtre de Suisse Romande) (1976) LP: DC 012
- Taragot et Orgue – Dumitru Farcas/Marcel Cellier LP/CD: DC 014
- Flûte de Pan et Orgue – Gheorghe Zamfir/Marcel Cellier (1977) LP/CD: DC 015
- Flûte de Pan et Orgue (Panflöte Und Orgel) – Horea Crishan/Marcel Cellier (1979) LP: DC INT147.601
- Le Mystère des Voix Bulgares vol. 2 (1987) LP/CD: DC 016
- Le Mystère des Voix Bulgares vol. 3 (1989) LP/CD: DC 017
- To Rumania with love – Ulrich Herkenhoff/Marcel Cellier (1991) CD: DC 018
- Flûte de Pan, Cymbalum et Orgue – Simeon Stanciu/Ion Miu/Marcel et Alexandre Cellier (1991)CD: DC 019
- Marcel Cellier présente La Hongrie d'autrefois (Yesterday's Hungary) (1995) CD: Verany
- Voyage au bout des notes – Alexandre Cellier/Jean Duperrex (1996) CD: DC 020
- Le Mystère des Voix Bulgares vol. 4 (1997) CD: DC 021
- Instruments et Rythmes Bulgares (1999) CD: DC 022
- De la Mer Noire à la Baltique (30 ans d'émissions de radio) (1999) 2CD: DO
- Concert pour les 80 ans de Marcel Cellier (Cully) DVD: DC 023
