= Epizod =

Bulgarian metal band

- Origin: Sofia, Bulgaria
- Genres: Thrash metal Heavy metal Folk metal
- Years active: 1988–1994, 1996–present
- Members: Dimitar Argirov; Simeon Angelov; Vasil Belezhkov; Simeon Hristov; Hristo Gyosharkov
- Past members: Vasil Kalpachki; Nikolay Urumov; Miroslav Galabov; Dragomir Draganov; Rosen Doychinov; Ivo Georgiev; Delyan Georgiev; Pavlin Bachvarov; Panayot Kerelezov; Stoyan Petrov; Deyan Aleksandrov; Emil Chendov
- Website: epizod.com

Epizod (Bulgarian: Епизод) is a Bulgarian heavy metal band formed in 1983 in Sofia. The first songs of the band were inspired by the French poet François Villon. Epizod are famous in Bulgaria for their concerts which include theatre, an Orthodox church choir, and an ensemble for Bulgarian folk songs and dances.

== History ==
=== 1980s–1993 ===
Since 1983 different musicians from the 'Emil Shekerdzhiyski' culture club in Sofia had played different music styles under the name 'Epizod. At that time the drummer was Panayot Kerelezov. When Rosen Doychinov (keyboards) and Miroslav Galabov (guitar) joined him and began to write their first original songs on lyrics by François Villon with the help of Simeon Hristov (bass guitar) who joined later the actual rock and metal band had its direction. They only needed a lead singer and so in 1989 Dimitar Argirov (then a student in the Medical University, Sofia) was found. It was going to be their very first album Pray!. Later during a concert it was announced the replacing of P. Kerelezov with new drummer Stoyan Petrov who played the second part of it. In October 1990, the British BBC filmed Epizod's concert at the National Palace of Culture in Sofia. After the change of the political regime in Bulgaria most of the band members emigrated in Western countries (Netherlands, Canada, Italy). Later M. Galabov returned to Bulgaria and together with S. Hristov (who remained in homeland at that time) found new musicians to fill the band: Vasil Kalpachki (vocals), Emil Tasev (drums) and Dragomir Draganov (guitar), who recorded the album together.

Two years later, in 1992 Vasil Kalpachki left them and the group recorded their second album Dead Among the Dead (with lyrics by Charles Baudelaire and François Villon) sung by guitarist M. Galabov. Later in 1993 they disbanded for about 3 years.

=== 1996–2009 ===
In 1996 S. Hristov and Dr. Draganov started work on songs from the album The Time Has Come with lyrics by the French classical poets François Villon and Pierre de Ronsard. They found their new singer Emil Chendov and drummer St. Petrov returned as well. The band toured with various keyboardists. Later E. Chendov briefly left the band and in 1999 they released a new album 'Respect' with singer Nikolay Urumov instead, leaving the previous album unreleased. Respekt featured two songs based on translations of the works of Moliere and Joachim du Bellay, but otherwise contained original material, written by Hristov and Draganov.

In 2000 Emil Chendov returned and the band started to work on The Bulgarian God, an album which is considered to be one of the best in the history of Bulgarian rock. The texts used in the songs are lyrics by the revolutionary poet Hristo Botev and Ivan Vazov. After the release of the first singles of the album The National Television included the song "Haiduks" based on a poem by Hristo Botev in the 2001 New Year's Eve Show. During that time Stoyan Petrov was replaced by the new drummer Hristo Gyosharkov. The album was officially released in 2002 and was one of the most sold albums of the year in Bulgaria. Essential for the success of the album were the voices of the guest folklore singers- father Andon, Daniela Velichkova, Kristina Yaneva as well as St.John Kukuzelis Choir.

In 2003 Epizod released the previously recorded album The Time Has Come. In 2004 they released Male songs. By the end of 2004 Epizod released the so-called rock opera (actually a conceptual album) Saint Patriarch Evtimiy. The promotional concert in Veliko Turnovo was held exactly where the events described in the album took place – at Tsarevets Castle, the reconstructed palace of the medieval Bulgarian tsars. The concert was filmed and later released on a DVD. The band appeared clad in armour, the show included a folklore dance ensemble, a church choir, Bulgarian folklore songs and the performance of the virtuoso Rosen Genkov who plays the ancient string instrument gadulka (Bulgarian: гъдулка) – a kind of Bulgarian rebec. In 2006 Epizod released the album Our Roots with the image of the Madara Rider on the front cover. On 3 January 2007 BBC announced Epizod as 'the most qualitative Bulgarian rock band'. In 2008 the band released the album The Old Warrior.

=== 2009–2010s ===
In April 2009 Epizod parted from the guitarist Dragomir Draganov and the bassist Simeon Hristov found a replacement in the person of Vasil Belezhkov (student in the National Music Academy 'Prof. Pancho Vladigerov' – Sofia) just a few days before their next concert. At first Vasil joins only as a guest musician just to cover the concerts till the end of Juny 2009 but in the meantime he accepts the offer of the band to become a member and to take part in the next album of Epizod. In December 2009 the keyboardist Delyan Georgiev (who is professional cameraman and participates in a film by Luc Besson) left the band and Vasil Belezhkov continued to work as keyboardist as well as guitarist. In the summer of 2010 the drummer Stoyan Petrov returned for a while in Epizod. In that time (July 2010 – January 2011) the band had concerts with various guest drummers – Stoyan Petrov, Hristo Gyosharkov, Ivan Tsonkov and Georgi Varamezov.

In October 2010 the album The people of Dulo was released. This album coincides with the 20th anniversary of Epizod and here take part some of the most famous rock singers in Bulgaria – Zvezdomir Keremidchiev from Ahat and Yordan Karadzhov from Signal as well as the young singer Filip Brashkov. There is also a guest composer – the music and lyrics of the first and the last songs are by Alexander Alexiev-Hoffart who is an artist and the cover of the album is a fragment from a historical picture painted by him. The picture represents Khan Kubrat – founder and ruler of Old Great Bulgaria from the Dulo clan sitting in his throne with his sons around him.

In January 2011 the young drummer Deyan Aleksandrov joined Epizod as a member of the band. In October 2012 the band finished the records on their album My prayer (the title song is based on the eponymous poem by Hristo Botev). It incorporates the typical for the group elements like Bulgarian folklore music, orthodox church singing and heavy metal. In this album take apart the folklore singers Iliya Lukov and Daniela Velichkova, the violinist Nikola Vaklinov and the kaval player Kiril Belezhkov (the younger brother of the guitarist Vasil), as well as Zvezdi, the aforementioned singer of rock band 'Ahat'. In this album Vasil Belezhkov manifests also as a composer/songwriter (the song "Father's advice" on the eponymous poem by Stefan Stambolov) and tambourist (the song from Pirin region "Elenko mome" sung by Iliya Lukov). Besides poems by Botev and Stambolov the album includes songs based on poems by the Russian poets Alexander Pushkin and Vladimir Vysotsky and one of the songs is with lyrics by the bassist Simeon Hristov. In the same year the first novel by Simeon Hristov – 'The treasure of Shishman' was released.

In 2016 Deyan Aleksanrov left the band and they toured with different guest musicians. In 2017 was released the album of Viktoriya Milanova (who was 11-years old Bulgarian girl at that time) and Epizod called I am Bulgarian. In the autumn of 2017 the drummer Hristo Gyosharkov rejoined Epizod and the band made a trip to Ukraine together with him and the family of Viktoriya. They participated in a concert held at the place where the Pereshchepina Treasure of the Bulgarian ruler Kubrat was found.

In the spring of 2018 three of the band members together with three guest performers presented in front of public the drama called Rock Theater 'Asparuh – the Battle of Ongal' written by Simeon Hristov. In this project the same performers play the theatrical roles, sing the songs and play the instruments. The text was based on the very new researches about the Bulgarian medieval history, religion, state organisation and relations with the Eastern Roman Empire. Later in the same year the band recorded their new songs with the singer Simeon Angelov who performs the role of Asparuh in the aforementioned rock theater and who is deputy director of a school in Sofia as well as a singer in an orthodox church choir. The new songs together with two of the already recorded songs – 'The laws of Krum', and 'The city of Asen' become part of the album The great rulers which is dedicated entirely to the Bulgarian medieval rulers (Tervel, Omurtag, Simeon, Samuil, Kaloyan, etc.)

In October 2020, Chendov was diagnosed with asthma, and had to leave Epizod in order to get treatment. The group briefly deputised Argirov to return to the vocals in his stead.

2023 saw the release of two greatest hits albums, Metalni dushi (Metal Souls) and Obich za Bulgaria (Love for Bulgaria), containing 37 tracks from between the two albums, culled from the band's discography over the past 20 years.

== Membership ==
=== Members ===
- Dimitar Argirov (Dimmi Argus) – vocals
- Simeon Hristov – bass guitar, backing vocals, drum programming, songwriter, producer
- Vasil Belezhkov – guitars, keyboards, tambura, backing vocals, songwriter
- Hristo Gyosharkov – drums

=== Former members ===
- Panayot Kerelezov – drums
- Rosen Doychinov – keyboards, songwriter
- Miroslav Galabov – guitars, backing vocals, songwriter
- Vasil Rangelov Kalpachki – vocals
- Dragomir Draganov – guitars, backing vocals, songwriter
- Emil Tasev – drums
- Yavor Aleksandrov – drums
- Nikolay Urumov- vocals
- Stoyan Petrov – drums
- Ivo Georgiev (musician) – keyboards
- Pavlin Bachvarov – keyboards
- Delyan Georgiev – keyboards
- Deyan Aleksandrov – drums
- Emil Chendov – vocals
- Simeon Angelov – vocals

=== Guest musicians ===
- Daniela Velichkova – folk singer
- Kristina Yaneva – folk singer
- Viktoriya Milanova – vocals
- Iliya Lukov – folk singer
- Kiril Yanev – vocals
- Zvezdomir Keremidchiev – vocals
- Yordan Karadzhov – vocals
- Filip Brashkov – vocals
- Alexander Alexiev-Hoffart – backing vocals
- Andon Petrov – backing vocals
- Ivan Lechev – backing vocals
- Ivaylo Kraychovski – backing vocals
- Vladimir Mitin – trumpet
- Petyo Mitin – accordion
- Angel Andonov – keyboards
- Nikola Vaklinov – violin
- Rosen Genkov – gadulka
- Nonyo Hristov – kaval
- Kiril Belezhkov – kaval
- Borislav Kyosev – bagpipes
- Martin Lyamov – bagpipes
- 'In Sacris' vocal ensemble (Boryana Naydenova – conductor)

== Discography ==
=== Studio albums ===
- Mолете се... / Pray (1992)
- Мъртвец сред Мъртъвци / Dead Among The Dead (1993)
- Респект / Respect (1999)
- Българският Бог / The Bulgarian God (2002)
- Дошло е време / The Time Has Come (2003)
- Мъжки песни / Songs of Men (2004)
- Свети патриарх Евтимий / St. Patriarch Evtimii (2004)
- Нашите корени / Our Roots (2006)
- Старият Войн / The Old Soldier (2008)
- Народът на Дуло / The people of Dulo (2010)
- Моята Молитва / My Prayer (2012)
- Аз съм българче / I am Bulgarian (2017) - with Victoria Milanova
- Великите владетели / The great rulers (2019)

=== Demo album ===
- Сенки от средновековието / Shadows of the Medieval Era (1990)

=== Greatest hits albums ===
- Метални души / Metal Souls (2023)
- Обич за България / Love for Bulgaria (2023)

=== Videos ===
- Епизод / Epizod (2004)
- Свети патриарх Евтимий / St. Patriarch Evtimii (2005)
