= Kaval Sviri =

Bulgarian folk song

Kaval Sviri (Bulgarian: Кавал свири, lit. 'A Kaval Plays') is a Bulgarian folk song.

== Lyrics ==
Bulgarian (Cyrillic alphabet)

Кавал свири, мамо,
горе доле, мамо, горе доле, мамо.
Кавал свири мамо,
горе доле, мамо, под селото.

Я ще ида, мамо, да го видя,
да го видя, мамо, да го чуя.

Ако ми е нашенчето
ще го любя ден до пладне,
Ако ми е ябанджийче
ще го любя дор до живот.

Latin alphabet transliteration

Kaval sviri, mamo,
gore, dole, mamo, gore, dole, mamo.
Kaval sviri, mamo,
gore, dole, mamo, pod seloto.

Ya shte ida mamo da go vidya,
da go vidya mamo, da go chuya.

Ako mi e nashencheto
shte go lyubya den do pladne,
ako mi e yabandzhiyche,
shte go lyubya dor do zhivot.

Translated into English

A kaval is playing, mother,
up, down, mother, up, down, mother.
A kaval is playing mother,
up, down, mother, near the village.

I will go, mother, to see it,
to see it, mother, to hear it.

If it's someone from our village
I'll love him only for a short time,
If it's a foreigner (i.e. from another village)
I'll love him all my life.

== Popular versions ==
A popular version was arranged by Petar Lyondev and performed by Ensemble Trakia on the Grammy Award-winning album Le Mystère des Voix Bulgares, Vol. II (album), released in 1987 by Disques Cellier in Switzerland.

"Kaval Sviri" was recorded by Australian world music ensemble Balkan Ethno Orchestra, and features on their 2020 EP Zora.

"Kaval Sviri" by Katya Barulova & Bulgar Halk Korosu, the Bulgarian State Radio & Television Female Vocal Choir, has been sampled on at least one electronic music album. This version has also achieved notable popularity on YouTube.

== Use as a sample and in popular culture ==
The song is a somewhat commonly used sample in modern pop and rap music as the following examples illustrate:

- Union Jack (1994) - Two Full Moons and a Trout
- Jinx (1996) - After the Fallout - Fresh Records (UK) (FRSHT32)
- Stahlhammer (1997) - Stahlingrad
- S. Castro (2013) - Krieger II (German)
- Kollegah (2014) - Königsaura
- Stan Kolev & Aaron Suiss (2020) - Anomalous (Original Mix)
- M.I.A. (2020) - OHMNI W202091
- SL (rapper) & M1llionz - Versus (2021)
- Tautumeitas - Ritual (2022)
- CA7RIEL & Paco Amoroso - Lo quiero ya! (2026)
- Business City - Valvottaja (2026)

The song was used by composer Joseph LoDuca as the basis for Xena's fight theme in Xena: Warrior Princess, although the vocals that appear in the show's opening sequence sing different lyrics.

The song was used to promote Lady Gaga's 2017 documentary "Five Foot Two".

A modified version of the song was used by Bulgarian influencer Misho Amoli as his entrance theme for «La Velada del Año III», a boxing event hosted by Ibai Llanos in 2023.

Singer Heli Andrea covered the song as a part of metal band Humanity's Last Breath's song "Instill".

The Seattle Cascades Drum and Bugle Corps included an arrangement of the song as part of their production "Sky Above" for the Drum Corps International 2024 competitive season.
