= Le Mystère des Voix Bulgares =

- 4AD reissue cover

Studio album by Bulgarian State Radio & Television Female Vocal Choir
- Released: 1975
- Genre: Bulgarian folk music
- Length: 36:06
- Label: Disques Cellier
- Compiler: Marcel Cellier

USA release (1987)
- Nonesuch Cover (1987)

Professional ratings
Review scores
Source	Rating
Allmusic	link
Pitchfork	9.6/10

Le Mystère des Voix Bulgares (translated as "The Mystery of Bulgarian Voices") is a compilation album of modern arrangements of Bulgarian folk songs featuring, among others, the Bulgarian State Radio & Television Female Vocal Choir conducted by Krasimir Kyurkchiyski, with soloists Yanka Rupkina, Kalinka Valcheva and Stefka Sabotinova; and the Filip Kutev Ensemble.

== Background and history ==
The album was the result of fifteen years of work by Swiss ethnomusicologist and producer Marcel Cellier and was released in 1975 on his small Disques Cellier label. Some of the recordings he made himself; others were taken from the archives of Radio Sofia. The album won a Grand Prix du Disque award. The album drew on an earlier release, Music of Bulgaria: Ensemble of the Bulgarian Republic, conducted by Kutev (credited as Philippe Koutev), which was released in 1966 by Elektra Records (EKL282), and which itself was a reissue of Ensemble de la République Bulgare, recorded in Paris in 1955 by Le Chant du Monde.

In the 1980s, Ivo Watts-Russell (founder of the British 4AD label) was introduced to the choir from a third or fourth generation audio cassette lent to him by Peter Murphy, singer from the band Bauhaus. He became thoroughly entranced by the music, and tracked down and licensed the recordings from Cellier. It was re-released in 1986 by 4AD in the UK, by the Nonesuch label in the US in 1987, and appeared on the Philips label in other territories.

Subsequent albums were released with similar titles: Le Mystère des Voix Bulgares, Volume 2 (1988), which also featured Ensemble Trakia, Ensemble Pirin, and Orchestra Yvan Kirev and soloists Nadejdva Chwoineva/Chvoineva, Verka Siderova, Tinka Pescheva, Vasilka Karadalieva, N. Karadjova, S. Petkova, Y. Taneva, S. Nikolova, Kalinka Valcheva, Vasilka Andonova, Paulina Gortcheva, Stoyanka Boneva, and Radka Aleksova, compositions by Krasimir Kyurkchiyski and Gueorgui Mintchev and arrangements by Peter Liondev, Kiril Stefanov, Krasimir Kyurkchiyski, Philip Koutev, N. Kaufman, and Stefan Moustachev, and won the Grammy Award for Best Traditional Folk Album in 1990; Le Mystère des Voix Bulgares, Volume 3 (1990); and Le Mystère des Voix Bulgares, Volume 4 (1998).

NPR ranked Le Mystère des Voix Bulgares, Volume 1 the 78th greatest album ever made by women.

== Reception, influence and legacy ==
The music has been acclaimed by various artists such as Paul Simon, Kate Bush, George Harrison, David Bowie, Frank Zappa, Peter Murphy of Bauhaus, Elizabeth Fraser of Cocteau Twins, Bobby McFerrin, Medwyn Goodall, Enrique Morente, Glen Phillips of Toad the Wet Sprocket, the Grateful Dead, Robert Plant and has prompted worldwide interest.

The American artist Linda Ronstadt stated that the music was "some of the most beautiful [she's] ever heard". The British-American musician Graham Nash of Crosby, Stills, Nash & Young declared after listening to the album: "Every musician who considers himself accomplished should listen to (this group's album) and rethink everything he knows (about singing)." Jerry Garcia of the Grateful Dead: "They're like angels... exceptionally pure, really polished. Our song 'Uncle John's Band' was inspired by the village music of Bulgaria." Dead Can Dance's singer Lisa Gerrard was so inspired by this album, she declared: "If anybody is changed by this, it's me..."

The soundtrack for the film Ghost in the Shell (1995) by Kenji Kawai was inspired by the music of the Mystery of the Bulgarian Voices. The track "Polegnala e pshenitsa" features in the soundtrack for the film Skeletons (2010); "Polegnala e Todora" appears on the soundtrack of Doc Hollywood (1991), erroneously credited to "Philip Kouter." The British band Leftfield also sampled this same track, the sample being featured on their Leftism album (1995) in the beginning of the album's opening track- "Release the pressure" (referenced here by Dan Leuca).

Composer Joseph LoDuca wrote the theme music and incidental music for Xena: Warrior Princess; The theme music was developed from the traditional Bulgarian folk song "Kaval sviri", sung by the Bulgarian State Television Female Vocal Choir. The original "Kaval sviri" can be heard when Xena races into battle in the Hercules episode "Unchained Heart".

The song "Parasite Eve" by Bring Me the Horizon starts with a sample from the song "Ergen deda". Their vocalist Oli Sykes shared in an interview for Kerrang! that he chose to include the snippet from "Ergen deda" because it felt euphoric but at the same time foreign and instilled a sense of panic and chaos.

It was ranked number 10 on Spin's list of "The 35 Best Albums of the Last 35 Years".

The textured choral stabs heard on the first beat of every measure throughout "Enjoy The Silence" consist of a series of sampled choir sounds each playing individual notes of a chord. Among these sounds are two sourced samples derived from the Bulgarian State Female Vocal Choir's 1975 "Sableyalo mi Agontze (The Bleating Lamb)", the first of which is played on the first beat per measure throughout the song, the second of which is played on the first beat of every fourth chorus measure (in time with the lyric "In my arms") https://dmlive.wiki/wiki/List_of_Depeche_Mode_sample_sources_by_album/Violator#6._%22Enjoy_The_Silence%22

== Track listing ==
1. "Pilentse pee" (Пиленце пее) [Birdie Sings] – 2:31
2. "Svatba" (Сватба) [The Wedding Procession] – 1:27
3. "Kalimankou Denkou" (Калиманко Денко) [The Evening Gathering] solo: Yanka Rupkina – 5:06
4. "Strati na Angelaki dumashe" (Страти на Ангелаки думаше) [Haiduk Song] – 2:37
5. "Polegnala e pshenitsa" (Полегнала е пшеница) [Harvest Song from Thrace] – 2:02
6. "Mesechinko lyo greïlivka" (Месечинко льо грейливка) [Love Song from the Rhodopes] – 2:31
7. "Breï Ivane" (Брей Иване) [Dancing Song] – 1:31
8. "Ergen deda" (Ерген дядо) [Diaphonic Chant] – 2:50
9. "Sableyalo mi agontse" (Заблеяло ми агънце) [The Bleating Lamb] solo: Kalinka Valcheva – 4:31
10. "Prituritse planinata" (Притури се планината) [Song from the Thracian Plain] with orchestra – 2:45
11. "Mir Stanke le" (Мър Станке ле) [Harvest Song from Thrace] solo: Stefka Sabotinova – 3:10
12. "Schopska pesen" (Шопска песен) [Song of Shopsko] – 1:27
13. "Polegnala e Todora" (Полегнала е Тодора) [Love Song] – 3:38
