= Viperfish (band) =

Bulgarian progressive punk rock band

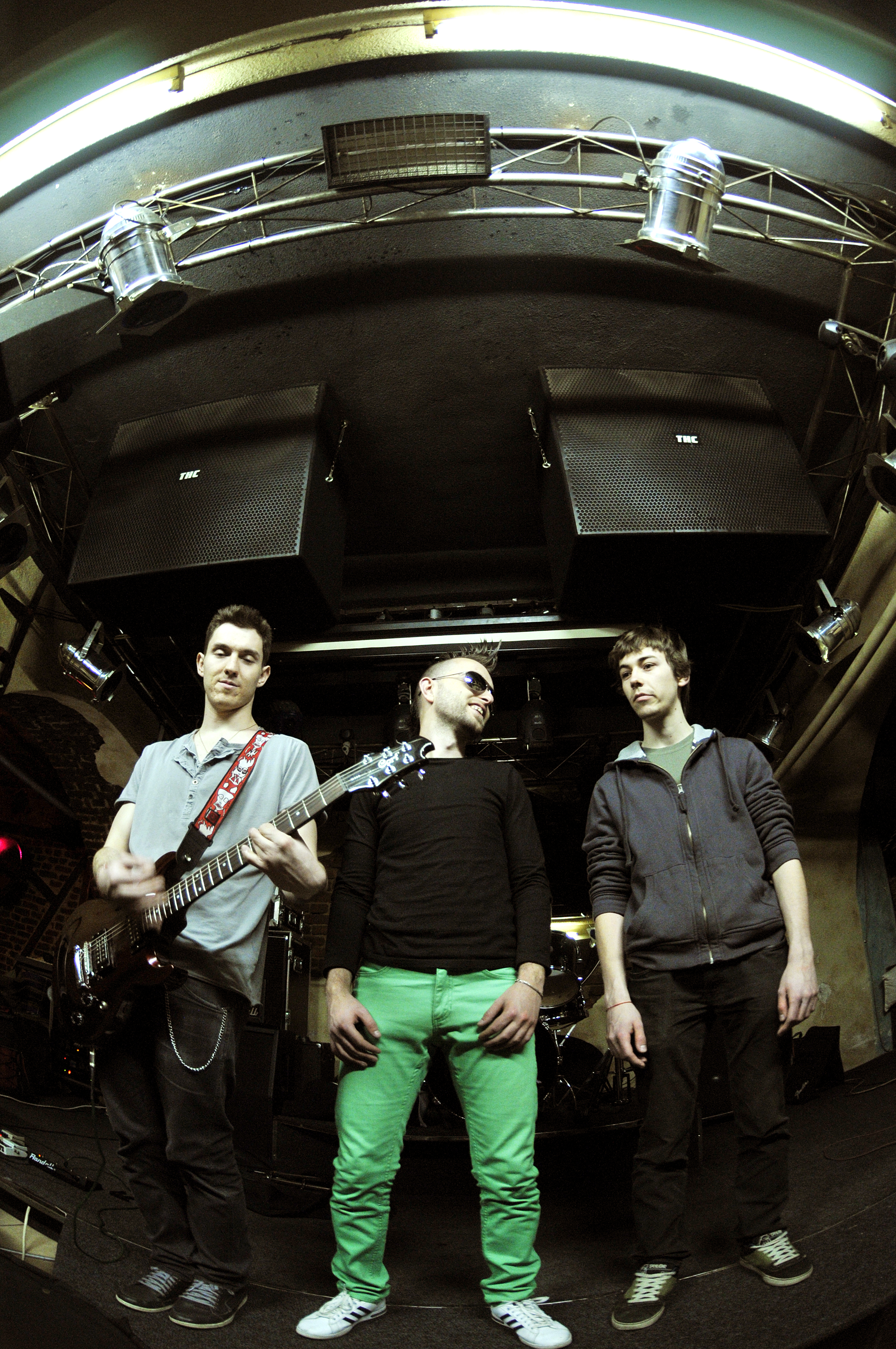
- Viperfish - December 2010 at Swingin' Hall

Background information
- Origin: Bulgaria
- Genres: New prog, progressive rock, punk rock
- Years active: 2007-present
- Members: Adrian Gougov; Dimo Mezekliev; Matey Hristoskov
- Website: www.viperfish1.com

Viperfish is a Bulgarian progressive punk-rock band. Formed in 2007 it currently consists of Adrian Gougov (main songwriter, lead guitar, lead vocals, and piano), Dimo Mezekliev (bass and backing vocals) and Matey Hristoskov (drums and backing-vocals). The style of the band could be defined as "aggressive, energetic, progressive rock with a melodramatic twist in it." The band has played at festivals in Bulgaria and the UK, as well as in most of the big venues in their home country, with over 50 performances to date.

Viperfish have released one EP - Viperfish EP - and three singles - "Explosive", "Right Where I Belong" and "Hope of Relief".

== History ==
Although the band has had a number of different line-ups, the realistic and proper starting point would be the arrival of Matey behind the drums in 2007. With only a couple of rehearsals behind their backs, they entered a battle of the bands competition in Sofia and won second place, therefore winning themselves a spot at the big annual Bulgarian festival "Tzvete za Gosho". In 2008, the band claimed the Grand Prix and two more awards at the Nessebar Pop & Rock Competition, defeating over 40 other bands and performers. Since then Viperfish (previously performing as 'Evolution') began playing frequently in most of Sofia's clubs and made a name for themselves in the underground scene as one of the most aggressive and energetic live bands around.

In December 2009 the band recorded six tracks and put them together into Viperfish EP. One of the songs, "Stain", topped Z-Rock Radio's Main chart for 12 consecutive weeks. The band was featured in the Bulgaria edition of Rolling Stone as one of the four most prominent rock acts in the country at that time. In 2010, a music video was shot for "Explosive". The trio decided that this event was just what they needed to change their name to Viperfish and give a fresh start to everything. Two years later they won another award at the Nessebar Pop & Rock Festival for best original music.

In the beginning of 2011 the band recorded and released two new songs which can be found on their website. In the summer of 2011 Viperfish played at the biggest international festival in Bulgaria: Spirit of Burgas, along with Deftones, Moby, Skindred and many others.

In the summer of 2012 Viperfish made a memorable performance at Vasil Levski National Stadium as the opening act for the Sofia Rocks 2012 festival. Unfortunately this would be their last gig to date as Adrian would come to suffer from a vocal cord infection that has left him unable to sing. Following that concert the band has gone on an indefinite hiatus with no clarity on whether a reunion is ever taking place.

== Releases ==
=== Album ===
Viperfish EP was Viperfish's debut EP, having been recorded in 2009 and released on Christmas Day the same year. The songs included are what the band thought were their most representative tracks at the time. Stanislav Donev (who produced the album) considered that 'Stain' best captured the full spectrum of styles present on the EP and therefore it was selected as the first single. The track stayed at the top of the Bulgarian Kamenitza Top 40 Rock Chart on Z-Rock radio for nearly four months.

The EP consists of:

- Explosive
- Me vs Me
- Nothing to Gain
- Something Someone
- Stain
- Invisible

=== Singles ===
"Explosive" is the second single to be released from Viperfish's debut EP. ("Stain" was released as the first single). It was made available on a single CD backed with a remix, a radio edit, the "Live @ Swingin' Hall" video and an interview the band did specifically to include on the single. "Explosive" is arguably Viperfish's most popular track, largely due to the accompanying video.

"Right Where I Belong" and "Power of Love" are two tracks that were recorded in January 2011. The idea behind the recordings was to experiment working in a different studio and to explore the heavier, more brutal side of the band. While "Power of Love" was a relatively old track, having been played throughout the whole of 2010, "Right Where I Belong" was a brand new track, which Adrian wrote less than a month earlier. The initial idea wasn't to make the sound as heavy as it turned out to be, but it was eventually decided to do so just to see what the fans' reaction would be.

"Hope of Relief" is a song that was inspired by and devoted to the victims of the 2011 Tohoku earthquake in Japan. The track was once again recorded with Stanislav Donev at Retro Studios, and so far this is the only Viperfish track that has never been performed live. "Hope of Relief" marks the first time the band released a song for digital distribution.

=== Other ===
"Celebrity" is a track created as a home record in 2008. It has never been professionally re-recorded or, in any way, remastered, but it has been a constant part of the bands setlist between 2008 and 2012.
