= Philip Kutev National Folk Ensemble =

- Formation: 1 May 1951
- Type: National cultural institute
- Legal status: Active
- Purpose: Preservation and presentation of Bulgarian folklore
- Location: Sofia, Bulgaria
- Region served: Worldwide
- Official language: Bulgarian
- Director: Georgi Andreev
- Key people: Philip Kutev (Founder)
- Main organ: Ministry of Culture
- Website: philipkoutev.com
- Remarks: Formerly known as State Ensemble for Folk Songs and Dances (DANPT)

The Philip Kutev National Folk Ensemble (Bulgarian: Национален фолклорен ансамбъл „Филип Кутев“), also known by its historical name State Ensemble for Folk Songs and Dances, is among the first large-scale professional folk ensembles in Bulgaria. The ensemble was founded in Sofia in 1951. Its creation marked the beginning of a new artistic genre: the professional presentation of arranged Bulgarian folklore on the concert stage.

At the core of its repertoire are composer arrangements of authentic folk songs and dances, as well as original works created in the spirit of tradition. Structurally, the ensemble is composed of three main sections: a multi-part female choir, an orchestra of traditional folk instruments, and a dance ensemble.

== History ==
The ensemble was founded on 1 May 1951, modeled after the Soviet Pyatnitsky Choir, which had toured Bulgaria shortly before. The composer Philip Kutev played a leading role in its creation, with the initiative involving various other institutions (the Committee for Art and Culture, Radio Sofia, and the Ethnographic Institute) and prominent figures such as Marin Goleminov, Asen Raztsvetnikov, Iliya Beshkov, Konstantin Petkanov, Rayna Katsarova, Elena Stoin, and Ivan Kachulev.

Philip Kutev shaped the ensemble's early repertoire with his own arrangements of traditional folk music and original compositions. Over the decades, the ensemble's artistic identity was further developed by creators and directors, including Zhivka Klinkova.

The ensemble recruits performers from all ethnographic regions of Bulgaria, with successive generations of prominent dancers, singers, and instrumentalists contributing to its legacy.

Following the death of Philip Kutev in 1982, the ensemble was named in his honor. For many years, the ensemble was directed by his daughter, Prof. Elena Kuteva. Since 2021, the director of the ensemble has been the composer Georgi Andreev.

== Performances and Awards ==
The National Folk Ensemble maintains an extensive concert schedule, performing on prestigious world stages across Europe, Asia, the Americas, and Africa. Over the decades, the ensemble has given thousands of performances, showcasing Bulgarian folk art in more than 50 countries. It is a regular participant in significant international forums and festivals, including the annual Apollonia Festival of Arts in Sozopol.

The ensemble's choir was one of the featured groups in the album Le Mystère des Voix Bulgares, Volume Two, which won a Grammy Award for Best Traditional Folk Album in 1989. The album included iconic recordings by the ensemble, such as "Dragana i Slavei" and "Planino, Stara Planino" (featuring soloist Nadka Karadjova), showcasing the choir's masterful polyphony to a global audience.

The collective has been honored with Bulgaria's highest state awards, including the Order of St. Cyril and St. Methodius and the "Golden Lyre" from the Union of Bulgarian Musicians and Dancers for exceptional artistic achievements. The ensemble is also a recipient of numerous international awards from prestigious folklore forums in Europe and Asia.

The high professional standard of the ensemble has been recognized by many accolades, including the "Nestinarka" Grand Prize at the International Folklore Festival Burgas (2011) for its outstanding contribution to the development and promotion of folklore.
