= Filip Kutev =

Bulgarian composer (1903–1982)

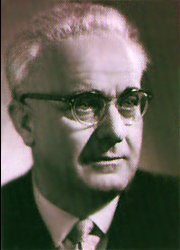
Philip Kutev

Filip Kutev (Bulgarian: Филип Кутев), often anglicized Philip Koutev (13 June 1903 – 27 November 1982), was a Bulgarian composer, arranger and founder, with his wife Maria Kuteva, in 1951, of Bulgaria's first professional, state supported ensemble, the State Ensemble for Folk Song and Dance, also known as the Filip Kutev Ensemble. With his ensemble he pioneered a style of arranging folk songs by fusing folk elements with western classical forms and harmonies, and established a new Bulgarian choral tradition.

His choir was one of four who appeared on the album Le Mystère des Voix Bulgares, Volume Two, which won a Grammy Award in 1989.

He was born in Aytos, Burgas Province.

== Honours ==
Kutev Peak in Antarctica is named after Filip Kutev.
