= Bulgaria in the Eurovision Song Contest 2006 =

- Eurovision Song Contest 2006
- Participating broadcaster: Bulgarian National Television (BNT)
- Country: Bulgaria
- Selection process: Bŭlgarskata pesen v „Evroviziya 2006”
- Selection date: 11 March 2006

Competing entry
- Song: "Let Me Cry"
- Artist: Mariana Popova
- Songwriters: Dani Milev; Elina Gavrilova

Placement
- Semi-final result: Failed to qualify (17th)

Participation chronology

Bulgaria was represented at the Eurovision Song Contest 2006 with the song "Let Me Cry", composed by Dani Milev, with lyrics by Elina Gavrilova, and performed by Mariana Popova. The Bulgarian participating broadcaster, Bulgarian National Television (BNT), organised the national final Bŭlgarskata pesen v „Evroviziya 2006” in order to select its entry for the contest. 24 entries were selected to participate in the national final which consisted of two shows: a semi-final and a final, held on 25 February 2006 and 11 March 2006, respectively. The top twelve songs of the semi-final as determined by a fifteen-member jury panel qualified to the final. In the final, public televoting exclusively selected "Let Me Cry" performed by Mariana Popova as the winning entry with 4,700 votes.

Bulgaria competed in the semi-final of the Eurovision Song Contest which took place on 18 May 2006. Performing during the show in position 2, "Let Me Cry" was not announced among the top 10 entries of the semi-final and therefore did not qualify to compete in the final. It was later revealed that Bulgaria placed seventeenth out of the 23 participating countries in the semi-final with 36 points.

== Background ==
Prior to the 2006 contest, Bulgarian National Television (BNT) had participated in the Eurovision Song Contest representing Bulgaria only once: in 2005 when "Lorraine" performed by Kaffe failed to qualify to the final.

As part of its duties as participating broadcaster, BNT organises the selection of its entry in the Eurovision Song Contest and broadcasts the event in the country. The broadcaster confirmed its participation in the 2006 contest on 20 December 2005. In 2005, BNT organised a national final in order to select its entry for the competition, a selection procedure that continued for its 2006 entry.

== Before Eurovision ==
=== Bŭlgarskata pesen v „Evroviziya 2006” ===
Bŭlgarskata pesen v „Evroviziya 2006” (The Bulgarian song in Eurovision 2006) was the national final format developed by BNT which determined the artist and song that would represent Bulgaria at the Eurovision Song Contest 2006. The competition consisted of a semi-final on 25 February 2006 and a final on 11 March 2006, held at the National Palace of Culture in Sofia. Both shows were hosted by Dragomir Simeonov and broadcast on Channel 1.

==== Competing entries ====
On 20 December 2005, BNT opened a submission period for artists and songwriters to submit their entries until 23 January 2006. By the end of the deadline, the broadcaster received 126 entries. On 3 February 2006, the twenty-four artists and songs selected for the competition by a fifteen-member committee were announced. The committee consisted of Vili Kazasyan (conductor and composer), Nayden Andreev (composer), Toncho Rusev (composer), Yordanka Hristova (singer), Zhivko Kolev (lyricist and screenwriter), Veselin Todorov (musician), Ana-Maria Tonkova (music journalist), Alexander Petrov (poet), Slavcho Nikolov (musician and composer), Momchil Kolev (musician and composer), Jivko Petrov (musician), Vasko Stefanov (director) and Petar Dundakov (composer).

On 6 February 2006, "Merak" performed by Vanya Kostova and Boyan Mihaylov was disqualified from the competition after the song had been performed in September 2005 and replaced with "Nevŭzmozhna tishina" performed by Mariana Pashalieva and Marin Yonchev. Pashalieva and Yonchev withdrew their song on 10 February 2006 by the decision of Yonchev's producer and replaced with "Lyubovta e otrova" performed by Slavi Trifonov and Sofi Marinova. On 13 February 2006, Trifonov and Marinova withdrew their song in protest of the selection of the committee and replaced with the song "V nyakoi drug zhivot" performed by Plamen Petrev and Angel.

Artist	Song	Songwriter(s)
Ani Lozanova	"Shte te zapalya" (Ще те запаля)	Rosen Cheshmedzhiev, Ani Lozanova
Big Mama Scandal	"All This Time"	Ivaylo Gochev
D'a Voices	"Celebrate Tonight"	Ognyan Ivanov
Deyan Nedelchev	"Na teb" (На теб)	Krasimir Gulmezov, Silvia Mikhailova
Geppy	"A Matter of Time"	Gospodin Gospodinov-Geppy, Nikolay Vasilev
Ivaylo Kolev	"Every Dream at Night"	Vladi Tozetta, Paula Pavlova
Mariana Popova	"Let Me Cry"	Dani Milev, Elina Gavrilova
Martin Aleksandrov	"Te vas"	Martin Alexandrov, Svetla Panteva
Mastilo	"Next to You"	Desislav Simeonov, Viktoria Terziyska
Melody Тraffic	"Love That You Can't See"	Melody Traffic, Neli Shishkova
Neda Karova and Da	"Wish"	Philip Vella, Gerard James Borg
Nemo	"Za mig" (За миг)	Alek Kireev
Plamen Petrev and Angel	"V nyakoi drug zhivot" (В някой друг живот)	Petr Pesev, Plamen Penev
Ralitsa Grudeva	"With You"	Alex Nushev, Alexandr Kiprov
Safo	"Land of Regret"	Vladimir Mikhailov
Sonya Todorova	"Trust Yourself"	Maxim Hristov, Sonya Todorova
Stalker	"Faces"	Militsa Gladnishka, Kiril Dobrev
Stoyan Zakhariev	"Karmic Love"	Stoyan Zakhariev, Jessy Steal
Sunnie	"I Can't Stop"	Stanislava Dimitrova-Sunnie
Sunrise	"Going to Sofia"	Georgi Marholev
Vasil Petrov and Instinkt	"Da mozhesh da chakash" (Да можеш да чакаш)	Kamen Drandiyski, Ivan Tenev
Vesela Boneva	"Let Me Live Again"	Stamen Yanev, Desislava Sofranova
Vesela Boneva and Plamen Pyatov	"That's Me"	Ivaylo Terziev
Violeta Jeknich	"Tants na noshtta" (Танц на нощта)	Goran Jeknich, Stanislava Dimitrova-Sunny

==== Semi-final ====
The semi-final took place on 25 February 2006. Twelve entries qualified to the final based on the votes of a jury panel. The fifteen-person jury consisted of Vili Kazasyan, Nayden Andreev, Toncho Rusev, Yordanka Hristova, Zhivko Kolev, Veselin Todorov, Anna-Maria Tonkova, Alexander Petrov, Slavcho Nikolov, Momchil Kolev, Zhivko Petrov, Vasko Stefanov and Petar Dundakov. In addition to the performances of the competing entries, guest performers were No Name (who represented Serbia and Montenegro in 2005), Fabrizio Faniello (who represented Malta in 2006), and Christine Guldbrandsen (who represented Norway in 2006).

Semi-final – 25 February 2006
R/O	Artist	Song	Result
1	Safo	"Land of Regret"	—N/a
2	Sunnie	"I Can't Stop"	—N/a
3	Sonya Todorova	"Trust Yourself"	Qualified
4	Ivaylo Kolev	"Every Dream at Night"	Qualified
5	Vasil Petrov and Instinkt	"Da mozhesh da chakash"	—N/a
6	Big Mama Scandal	"All This Time"	Qualified
7	Deyan Nedelchev	"Na teb"	—N/a
8	Ralitsa Grudeva	"With You"	—N/a
9	Plamen Petrev and Angel	"V nyakoi drug zhivot"	—N/a
10	Neda Karova and Da	"Wish"	Qualified
11	Nemo	"Za mig"	—N/a
12	Stalker	"Faces"	—N/a
13	Violeta Jeknich	"Tants na noshtta"	—N/a
14	Stoyan Zakhariev	"Karmic Love"	Qualified
15	Mastilo	"Next to You"	Qualified
16	Vesela Boneva and Plamen Pyatov	"That's Me"	Qualified
17	D'a Voices	"Celebrate Tonight"	—N/a
18	Geppy	"A Matter of Time"	Qualified
19	Sunrise	"Going to Sofia"	—N/a
20	Melody Тraffic	"Love That You Can't See"	Qualified
21	Mariana Popova	"Let Me Cry"	Qualified
22	Ani Lozanova	"Shte te zapalya"	Qualified
23	Vesela Boneva	"Let Me Live Again"	Qualified
24	Martin Aleksandrov	"Te vas"	—N/a

==== Final ====
The final took place on 11 March 2006. The twelve semi-final qualifiers competed and "Let Me Cry" performed by Mariana Popova was selected as the winner exclusively by public televoting. In addition to the performances of the competing entries, guest performers were Elitsa Todorova and Stoyan Yankoulov.

Final – 11 March 2006
R/O	Artist	Song	Televote	Place
1	Stoyan Zakhariev	"Karmic Love"	658	9
2	Vesela Boneva	"Let Me Live Again"	1,437	5
3	Mariana Popova	"Let Me Cry"	4,700	1
4	Neda Karova and Da	"Wish"	717	8
5	Sonya Todorova	"Trust Yourself"	173	11
6	Ani Lozanova	"Shte te zapalya"	253	10
7	Ivailo Kolev	"Every Dream at Night"	3,993	3
8	Mastilo	"Next to You"	4,000	2
9	Vesela Boneva and Plamen Pyatov	"That's Me"	991	6
10	Melody Тraffic	"Love That You Can't See"	1,681	4
11	Geppy	"A Matter of Time"	773	7
12	Big Mama Scandal	"All This Time"	167	12

=== Controversy ===
Following the Bulgarian national final, a letter signed by nine of the finalists demanded a revote due to their lines being blocked during the voting window. They also accused BNT for fixing the voting in favour of Mariana Popova. The broadcaster later denied such claims and stated that the ranking remained the same even after the late votes were processed.

== At Eurovision ==
According to Eurovision rules, all nations with the exceptions of the host country, the "Big Four" (France, Germany, Spain and the United Kingdom) and the ten highest placed finishers in the 2005 contest are required to qualify from the semi-final on 18 May 2006 in order to compete for the final on 20 May 2006; the top ten countries from the semi-final progress to the final. On 21 March 2006, a special allocation draw was held which determined the running order for the semi-final and Bulgaria was set to perform in position 2, following the entry from Armenia and before the entry from Slovenia. At the end of the semi-final, Bulgaria was not announced among the top 10 entries and therefore failed to qualify to compete in the final. It was later revealed that Bulgaria placed seventeenth in the semi-final, receiving a total of 36 points.

The semi-final and the final were broadcast in Bulgaria on Channel 1 with commentary by Elena Rosberg and Georgi Kushvaliev. BNT appointed Dragomir Simeonov as its spokesperson to announce the Bulgarian votes during the final.

=== Voting ===
Below is a breakdown of points awarded to Bulgaria and awarded by Bulgaria in the semi-final and grand final of the contest. The nation awarded its 12 points to Russia in the semi-final and to Greece in the final of the contest.

==== Points awarded to Bulgaria ====
Points awarded to Bulgaria (Semi-final)
Score	Country
12 points	
10 points	
8 points	Albania; Cyprus
7 points	
6 points	Macedonia
5 points	Spain
4 points	France
3 points	Greece
2 points	
1 point	Portugal; Turkey

==== Points awarded by Bulgaria ====
Points awarded by Bulgaria (Semi-final)
Score	Country
12 points	Russia
10 points	Bosnia and Herzegovina
8 points	Armenia
7 points	Finland
6 points	Lithuania
5 points	Macedonia
4 points	Sweden
3 points	Ukraine
2 points	Cyprus
1 point	Turkey

Points awarded by Bulgaria (Final)
Score	Country
12 points	Greece
10 points	Russia
8 points	Armenia
7 points	Bosnia and Herzegovina
6 points	Macedonia
5 points	Finland
4 points	Turkey
3 points	Ukraine
2 points	Romania
1 point	Lithuania
