= Bulgaria in the Eurovision Song Contest 2005 =

- Eurovision Song Contest 2005
- Participating broadcaster: Bulgarian National Television (BNT)
- Country: Bulgaria
- Selection process: Bŭlgarskata pesen v „Evroviziya 2005”
- Selection date: 12 February 2005

Competing entry
- Song: "Lorraine"
- Artist: Kaffe
- Songwriters: Vesselin Vesselinov-Eko; Orlin Pavlov

Placement
- Semi-final result: Failed to qualify (19th)

Participation chronology

Bulgaria was represented at the Eurovision Song Contest 2005 with the song "Lorraine", written by Vesselin Vesselinov-Eko and Orlin Pavlov, and performed by the band Kaffe. The Bulgarian participating broadcaster, Bulgarian National Television (BNT), organised the national final Bŭlgarskata pesen v „Evroviziya 2005” in order to select its entry for the contest. This was the first-ever entry from Bulgaria in the Eurovision Song Contest.

Twenty-four entries were selected to participate in the national final which consisted of two shows: a semi-final and a final, held on 22 January 2005 and 12 February 2005, respectively. The top twelve songs of the semi-final as determined by an eleven-member jury panel qualified to the final. In the final, public televoting exclusively selected "Lorraine" performed by Kaffe as the winning entry with 76,590 votes.

Bulgaria competed in the semi-final of the Eurovision Song Contest which took place on 19 May 2005. Performing during the show in position 21, "Lorraine" was not announced among the top 10 entries of the semi-final and therefore did not qualify to compete in the final. It was later revealed that Bulgaria placed nineteenth out of the 25 participating countries in the semi-final with 49 points.

== Background ==
On 4 November 2004, the Bulgarian national broadcaster, Bulgarian National Television (BNT), confirmed its intentions to debut at the Eurovision Song Contest in its 2005 edition after several unsuccessful attempts before 2000. On 26 November 2004, the broadcaster announced that it would organise a national final in order to select its debut entry for the 2005 contest.

== Before Eurovision ==
=== Bŭlgarskata pesen v „Evroviziya 2005” ===
Bŭlgarskata pesen v „Evroviziya 2005” (The Bulgarian song in Eurovision 2005) was the national final format developed by BNT which determined the artist and song that would represent Bulgaria at the Eurovision Song Contest 2005. The competition consisted of a semi-final on 22 January 2005 and a final on 12 February 2005. Both shows were hosted by Aleksandra Sarchadjieva and Deyan Slavchev – Deo and broadcast on Channel 1.

==== Competing entries ====
On 2 December 2004, BNT opened a submission period for artists and songwriters to submit their entries until 15 January 2005. By the end of the deadline, the broadcaster received 104 entries. On 18 January 2005, the twenty-four artists and songs selected for the competition by an eleven-member committee were announced. The committee consisted of Borislav Gerontiev (Program Director of BNT), Yordanka Hristova (singer), Stefan Dimitrov (singer and composer), Krasimir Gyulmezov (singer-songwriter and musician), Georgi Krasimirov (composer and producer), Ana-Maria Tonkova (music journalist), Konstantin Markov (musician), Ivan Lechev (musician and composer), Alexander Petrov (poet), Slavcho Nikolov (musician and composer) and Ivaylo Kitsov (music critic and journalist).

Artist	Song	Songwriter(s)
Aija	"My Love"	Lubomir Savov
Darina Ivanova and United Voices	"United"	Ognyan Ivanov
Deep Zone Project feat. Aiya and Vesela	"The Dance of the World"	Dian Savov, Lubomir Savov, Aleksander Kiprov
Doni and Neti	"Pokazhi mi" (Покажи ми)	Dobrin Vekilov-Doni
Duet Mania	"Bitter Sweet"	Stefan Shirokov
Galina Dimitrova-Kali	"Molitva" (Молитва)	Tsvetan Spasov, Georgi Kurtev, Ivaylo Valchev
Grafa	"Ako ima rai" (Ако има рай)	Vladimir Ampov
Gravity Co.	"What I Want"	Gravity Co.
Grudi Neikov	"Nyakoi te chaka" (Някой те чака)	Grudi Neikov
Ivan Georgiev-Ustata	"Vsichki drehi mi prechat" (Всички дрехи ми пречат)	Ivan Georgiev-Ustata
Kaffe	"Lorraine"	Vesselin Vesselinov-Eko, Orlin Pavlov
Krastina Kokorska	"Call on Me"	Dimitar Penev, Martina Dimova
L.A.	"Lyubov na snimka" (Любов на снимка)	Yasen Kozev, Krum Georgiev, Gergana Turiyska
Melody	"Otkriy me sega" (Открий ме сега)	Boris Chakurov, Rozina Karaslovova
Nina Nikolina	"Ne moga" (Не мога)	Magomed Aliyev-Maga, Gergana Turiiska
Nona Yotova	"Ke te molam" (Ке те молам)	Nona Yotova
Relax	"Tyrsia teb" (Търся теб)	Trifon Trifonov
Sashka Vittau	"Kissing Your Lips"	Sashka Vittau, Alex Tschallener, Charles Walker, Dorothea Dittrich
Slavi Trifonov and Sofi Marinova	"Edinstveni" (Единствени)	Evgeni Dimitrov, Slavi Trifonov, Georgi Milchev
Stoyan Royanov	"Taodos" (Таодос)	Stoian Roianov
Vasil Naydenov, Roberta, Mariana Popova and Orlin Goranov	"Az znam" (Аз знам)	Daniela Kuzmanova, Rumen Boyadjiev, Alexander Brazitsov
Vasko Ivanov	"Samo edin moment" (Само един момент)	Vasko Ivanov
Vesela Zheleva	"Vyarvay" (Вярвай)	Lubomir Savov
Veselin Marinov	"Sleda po pyasuka" (Следа по пясъка)	Veselin Marinov, Svetoslav Loboshki

==== Semi-final ====
The semi-final took place on 22 January 2005 at the BNT studios in Sofia. Twelve entries qualified to the final based on the votes of a jury panel. The eleven-person jury consisted of Borislav Gerontiev, Yordanka Hristova, Stefan Dimitrov, Krasimir Gyulmezov, Georgi Krasimirov, Ana-Maria Tonkova, Konstantin Markov, Ivan Lechev, Alexander Petrov, Slavcho Nikolov and Ivaylo Kitsov. In addition to the performances of the competing entries, the guest performer was Bon-Bon.

Semi-final – 22 January 2005
R/O	Artist	Song	Result
1	Relax	"Tyrsia teb"	—N/a
2	Kaffe	"Lorraine"	Qualified
3	Doni and Neti	"Pokazhi mi"	—N/a
4	Vasil Naydenov, Roberta, Mariana Popova and Orlin Goranov	"Az znam"	Qualified
5	Grafa	"Ako ima rai"	Qualified
6	Slavi Trifonov and Sofi Marinova	"Edinstveni"	Qualified
7	Nona Yotova	"Ke te molam"	—N/a
8	Krastina Kokorska	"Call on Me"	—N/a
9	Nina Nikolina	"Ne moga"	—N/a
10	Darina Ivanova and United Voices	"United"	—N/a
11	Sashka Vittau	"Kissing Your Lips"	—N/a
12	Ivan Georgiev-Ustata	"Vsichki drehi mi prechat"	Qualified
13	Stoian Roianov	"Taodos"	Qualified
14	Aija	"My Love"	Qualified
15	Grudi Neikov	"Nyakoi te chaka"	—N/a
16	Deep Zone Project feat. Aiya and Vesela	"The Dance of the World"	Qualified
17	Veselin Marinov	"Sleda po pyasuka"	—N/a
18	Duet Mania	"Bitter Sweet"	Qualified
19	Vasko Ivanov	"Samo edin moment	—N/a
20	Galina Dimitrova-Kali	"Molitva"	Qualified
21	L.A.	"Lyubov na snimka"	—N/a
22	Gravity Co.	"What I Want"	Qualified
23	Melody	"Otkriy me sega"	Qualified
24	Vesela Zheleva	"Vyarvay"	—N/a

==== Final ====
The final took place on 12 February 2005 at the National Palace of Culture in Sofia. The twelve semi-final qualifiers competed and "Lorraine" performed by Kaffe was selected as the winner exclusively by public televoting which ran between 28 January and 12 February 2005. Slavi Trifonov and Sofi Marinova refused to perform their song as they believed that the voting was fixed in favour of Kaffe, with Trifonov reading a protest message during their time on stage. In addition to the performances of the competing entries, guest performers were B.T.R. and Dimitar Ekimov.

Final – 12 February 2005
R/O	Artist	Song	Televote		Place
R/O	Artist	Song	Votes	Percentage	Place
1	Deep Zone Project feat. Aiya and Vesela	"The Dance of the World"	—	0.3%	12
2	Aija	"My Love"	—	0.4%	11
3	Kaffe	"Lorraine"	76,590	53%	1
4	Stoyan Royanov	"Taodos"	—	2.9%	4
5	Slavi Trifonov and Sofi Marinova	"Edinstveni"	48,803	28%	2
6	Gravity Co.	"What I Want"	—	1.7%	8
7	Duet Mania	"Bitter Sweet"	—	0.7%	10
8	Melody	"Otkriy me sega"	—	1.2%	9
9	Galina Dimitrova-Kali	"Molitva"	—	2%	7
10	Vasil Naydenov, Roberta, Mariana Popova and Orlin Goranov	"Az znam"	—	2.6%	5
11	Ivan Georgiev-Ustata	"Vsichki drehi mi prechat"	—	2.1%	6
12	Grafa	"Ako ima rai"	7,586	5.1%	3

=== Controversy ===
Following the announcement of Kaffe as the winner of the Bulgarian national final, booing was heard from the audience with some of them leaving the venue before the band's reprise performance. Further accusations were made afterwards by Slavi Trifonov that the producers of Kaffe had purchased SIM cards and hired people in advance to vote for them; "Lorraine" received only 3,000 votes before the final, however, the number increased drastically by 60,000 at the last moment. On 13 February, mobile operator MobilTel which was responsible for the SMS voting released a statement confirming that the results were legitimate. BNT also stated that they would consider taking legal action against Trifonov's refusal to perform his song in the final. In addition, it was claimed that "Lorraine" had plagiarised the song "Ne si otivay" performed by Ruslan Mainov, which was released in 2001.

== At Eurovision ==
According to Eurovision rules, all nations with the exceptions of the host country, the "Big Four" (France, Germany, Spain and the United Kingdom) and the ten highest placed finishers in the 2004 contest are required to qualify from the semi-final on 19 May 2005 in order to compete for the final on 21 May 2005; the top ten countries from the semi-final progress to the final. On 22 March 2005, a special allocation draw was held which determined the running order for the semi-final and Bulgaria was set to perform in position 21, following the entry from Croatia and before the entry from Ireland. At the end of the semi-final, Bulgaria was not announced among the top 10 entries and therefore failed to qualify to compete in the final. It was later revealed that Bulgaria placed nineteenth in the semi-final, receiving a total of 49 points.

The semi-final and the final were broadcast in Bulgaria on Channel 1 with commentary by Elena Rosberg and Georgi Kushvaliev. BNT appointed Evgenia Atanasova as its spokesperson to announce the Bulgarian votes during the final.

=== Voting ===
Below is a breakdown of points awarded to Bulgaria and awarded by Bulgaria in the semi-final and grand final of the contest. The nation awarded its 12 points to Belarus in the semi-final and to Greece in the final of the contest.

==== Points awarded to Bulgaria ====
Points awarded to Bulgaria (Semi-final)
Score	Country
12 points	
10 points	Cyprus
8 points	Macedonia
7 points	Greece; Moldova
6 points	Spain
5 points	Turkey
4 points	Albania
3 points	
2 points	
1 point	Bosnia and Herzegovina; Serbia and Montenegro

==== Points awarded by Bulgaria ====
Points awarded by Bulgaria (Semi-final)
Score	Country
12 points	Belarus
10 points	Macedonia
8 points	Croatia
7 points	Hungary
6 points	Moldova
5 points	Romania
4 points	Israel
3 points	Switzerland
2 points	Norway
1 point	Ireland

Points awarded by Bulgaria (Final)
Score	Country
12 points	Greece
10 points	Cyprus
8 points	Romania
7 points	Macedonia
6 points	Moldova
5 points	Hungary
4 points	Serbia and Montenegro
3 points	Turkey
2 points	Croatia
1 point	Norway
