= Duet Mania =

Bulgarian pop duo

- Origin: Sofia, Bulgaria
- Genres: Pop; dance; R&B
- Years active: 1999–present
- Labels: PolySound; Select Music; Stefko's Music
- Members: Daniela Petkova; Julia Dimitrova

Duet Mania (Bulgarian: Дует Мания) is a Bulgarian pop duo formed in Sofia in 1999 and consisting of the sisters Daniela Petkova and Julia Dimitrova.

Duet Mania began their musical endeavors in their pre-teens in their home town Dimitrovgrad, Bulgaria, as members of a children choir called "Happy Childhood" and as lead vocalists of a band called "Sparkles". After years of performing underground they were signed to "PolySound" as Duet Mania. In 1999 they released their first best-selling album called Ne e istina, which contained the number one singles "Svetat e za dvama", "Pesenta na shturcite", "Ne e istina", "Ne iskam, ne moga". The album went on to become a critical and commercial success, with estimated sales of more than 50 thousand. They are the most successful Bulgarian female duet in the history of pop music, topping the charts all over the country from 1999 to present All the songs from the album became part of the series hit-song compilations of "PolySound" called Klubna ataka.

In the year of 2000 Duet Mania was pronounced "Best Bulgarian Pop Duet", by "Art Rock Center". The same year during their Macedonian tour, they were the opening act for the concert of the Serbian star Zeljko Samardzic.

In 2001 the song "Ne iskam, ne moga" became hit song of the BG radio compilation "Love songs for loved people".

Duet Mania are producers of their second album Hladni ochi, released in 2003. It was published by Select Music and distributed by Stefko's Music. Signature hits of the album became "Hladni ochi", "Mnogo dalech", "Dajd ot liubov", "Shte bada tam", "Bialo", etc. In 2003 "Forever in Love" was pronounced “Golden Hit” of Planeta TV. The same year they had been invited by the diva of the Bulgarian pop music - Lili Ivanova as an opening act for her concert, which was attended by her close friend Jean-Claude Van Damme.

In 2005 after taking a short break Daniela and Julia released the single "Whatcha Waiting For", written by Ivan Dinev and Simeon Somlev, followed by the single "Bittersweet", written for the most prestigious song contest in Europe, the Eurovision Song Contest. Duet Mania's performance on Eurovision brought them popularity all over Europe.

In 2007 they released the single "I Didn't Know You".

The sisters had worked with the most famous Bulgarian artists - Lili Ivanova, Vasil Naydenov, B.T.R., Tonika, Orlin Goranov, Kristina Dimitrova, Silvia Katzarova, Vassil Petrov, Margarita Hranova, Yordanka Hristova, Petia Buiuklieva, Kamelia Todorova and Ilia Angelov. They had recorded backing vocals for Georgi Hristov, Kamelia Todorova, Petia Buiuklieva and Ilia Angelov.

Daniela and Julia had been touring all over the world and had captured the hearts of millions of fans in Norway, Germany, Denmark, Russia, Cyprus, Israel, Egypt, Czech Republic, England, Ireland, Switzerland, North Macedonia, China, South Korea, United States. In the summer of 2011 they were the opening act for ABBA at a private event in Bulgaria.

== Early life ==
Daniela and Julia were born and raised in a small town situated in the south part of Bulgaria, called Dimitrovgrad They grew up in a musician's family. Their father is a guitarist and a singer. He was the one who inspired the girls to start singing from an early age. Their grandmother was a singer and their grandfather was a kaval player. Their mother is a former model and an artist. They both attended PMG Ivan Vazov high school.

At the age of 11 and 13 Julia and Daniela started singing in a choir called "Happy Childhood". They were part of many music festivals and competitions around the country and they always came back home with the 1st prize. At the same age Julia and Daniela influenced by the movie “Heavenly Bodies” fell in love with the aerobics and in 2003 they became certified aerobics and fitness instructors. In high school they became lead singers of a band called "Sparkles". After graduating high school the sisters, one after another, became lead singers of their father's band Consonance.

== Music career ==
Duet Mania was created in 1999, by the Bulgarian music producer Valio Markov, "PolySound". Until 1999 both of the sisters had been performing solo. Daniela graduated from the National Academy of Music as a Bachelor of pop and jazz singing in the class of prof. Stefka Onikian and studied saxophone in the class of prof. Vlaio Vlaev. Julia took vocal lessons from prof. Stefka Onikian.

The sisters started singing together in 1998 as lead singers of the band "Step on fire". They were signed by the Norwegian music agency “Ram” and they started singing on ships of the cruise company Color line, travelling from Norway to Denmark and Germany. In 1999 Daniela and Julia participated in the International Music Festival for Young Talents “Melfest”, Macedonia with the song When you believe and won 1st prize. Their debut song "Svetat e za dvama", brought them huge success. The song is a dance cover of a Bulgarian old hit song, originally recorded by Orlin Goranov. The second song they recorded, "Pesenta na shturcite" became their second big hit. It's another cover song, originally recorded by Roksana Beleva. Their 1st original song “Ne e istina”, became a popular hit, too. But the single “Ne iskam, ne moga” brought them the biggest success. The song became a Golden Hit of BG Radio and it was part of two CD compilations – “Club Attack” and “Love songs for loved people”. “Ne iskam, ne moga” is considered a Bulgarian evergreen song. Their 1st album “Ne e istina” was released in October 1999.

In 2000, they were pronounced "Best Duet of 2000" by “Art Rock Center”, Bulgaria. The same year the sisters participated in the "World Championships of Performing Arts" held in Los Angeles, CA and grabbed the 1st prize and the gold with the song “When you believe” in the category for female pop duet. During the event the sisters were noticed by some local record labels, TV-commercials production companies, model agencies who were interested working with them and who offered them to sign contracts starting from September 2001. On 11 September 2001, the World Trade Center in New York City was destroyed in a terrorist attack and many people died. The tragedy prevented the sisters from returning to America and the desire of pursuing their dreams there was deeply buried. The same year the girls started a new Las Vegas style show and named it “Shake Mania”. The show was created especially for the cruise company Color Line.

In 2003, Daniela and Julia were invited to participate in the “International Folk Song and Arts Festival” held in Nanning, China. They had 10 outdoor live concerts and one at "Nanning Theater". They were on the first pages of the Chinese newspapers and on the TV. More than 16 million people became familiar with duet Mania and their music. In November 2003 the sisters released their 2nd album “Hladni ochi”. Popular hits became “Mnogo dalech”, nominated as a Golden hit of Planeta TV, “Hladni ochi” and “Dajd ot liubov”.

In 2004, Daniela and Julia were invited to take part in another International festival “Meet in Beijing”, China. They performed there with a popular Bulgarian rock band called B.T.R. The same year they participated in the International Music Song Contest “Universetalent”, held in Prague, Czech Republic where they received the 3rd prize with the song “Hladni ochi”.

In 2005, the sisters took a new challenge. In 2005 after taking a short break Daniela and Julia released the single “Whatcha waiting for” with the idea to participate in one of the biggest European Song Contests "Eurovision". But their manager Stefan Shirokov asked them to participate with another song, “Bitter-sweet”, written by Georgi Gogov, violinist and bassist of the German rock band “City”. The song was written especially for the contest. Their performance on "Eurovision" brought them popularity all over Europe and they had conquered the hearts of millions of fans. The same year they participated in another Music Festival, “Discovery” held in Varna, Bulgaria. They received the award “Best Performance”. The same year they signed a contract with a Korean Music Agency and went to perform in Seoul, South Korea.

In 2006, Daniela and Julia were invited to participate in “Blues to Bob Festival” held in Lugano, Switzerland where they performed with Angel Zaberski – piano, Ivelin Atanasov – piano, Mitko Shanov – bass, Mitko Semov – drums, and the Bulgarian Frank Sinatra, Vasil Petrov. The same year they were special guests of the International “Jazz Festival Bansko” where they performed with Ivelin Atanasov – piano, Radoslav Slavchev – bass, Stoyan Koprinkov – drums, Kiril Tashkov – guitar.

In 2007, the sisters recorded a new single “Ne poznavah teb”, written by Magomed Aliev-Maga and shot the video for the song. The same year Daniela's boyfriend, the former pianist of the band "Latino Partizani”, Ivelin Atanasov won a Green Card and proposed Daniela. They got married and moved to New York City. Since 2008 the sisters had been touring mostly in United States. In the summer of 2009 Duet Mania had been invited to sing on board of the cruise line ship M/S Julia travelling from Cork, Ireland to Swansea, Wales.

In 2014, Daniela leftNew York and moved back to Bulgaria for good. The sisters got together again which speeded up the growth of their music career. The same year they recorded the single “Hiliadi vaprosi” written and arranged by Stamen Yanev and lyrics by Geri Turiiska.

In 2015, was released DJ Diass' remix of their biggest hit song "Ne iskam, ne moga". The same year they were invited by Ruse's Philharmonic Orchestra to become a part of a series of concerts "ABBA Tribute". Daniela and Julia performed with Ruse's Philharmonic Orchestra and the conductor Dimitar Kosev as they presented together "ABBA Tribute" in Ruse, Silistra and Popovo, where they made the audience stand up multiple times.

In 2016, the sisters released many singles. The first one was "Whatcha waiting for" in a new arrangement made by Svetlin Kaslev. The next single was “Parva sreshta” written and arranged by Aleksander Kostov and lyrics by Valentina Cenova with the special featuring of the rapper Julias Celestin. The same year the director of the International Music Festival „Discovery“, Dono Tzvetkov composed two songs for them – the Christmas song “Biala prikazka” and the song “Ako dal si nadejda”, recorded together with the children vocal group “Da”. “Biala prikazka” became part of the Christmas album “Prikazka srebarnobiala”, and “Ako dal si nadejda” became part of the album Valshebnici. With the song "Аko dal si nadejda" starts the music student's book for seventh grade, Anubis Edition. In the summer of 2015, 2016 and 2017 Daniela and Julia had been performing the shows "ABBA Tribute" and ""Queens of Dance & Soul" at one of the best Bulgarian summer resorts - "Sunny Beach". Three years in row, in 2016, 2017 and 2018 Duet Mania was invited as a special guest of the International Music Festival „Discovery“ held in Varna.

In June 2017, the sisters were pronounced “Artists of the week” by Market Radio. The single “Formata” was released the same year. It was written and arranged by Daniela's husband Ivelin Atanasov and lyrics by Daniela Petkova, provoked by iniquity in the music business in Bulgaria, the attitude of the media towards Bulgarian pop artists and a single case in which the duet became a victim of a fraud committed by a man, part of the rapper's guild. The same year they performed with “Groove Connection” band on board of a cruise line ship M/S Amorella, “Viking Line” which travelled from Finland to Sweden. In 2017 Daniela and Julia participated in the Music Festival „Burgas I moreto “, Burgas with the song “Pareshti sledi” written and arranged by Stamen Yanev and lyrics by Valentina Cenova. The same year sisters released the single “Tvoia biah” written and arranged by Aleksander Kostov and lyrics by Valentina Cenova.

In 2018, they performed on stage of the Summer theater in Varna at the Holiday concert organized by district “Primorski”. In June, the same year, the sisters were pronounced “Best duet of 2018” by the 21-st Awards For Fashion, Style and Show Business held in Varna. In the summer of 2018, they released the single “Sabudi me” which music and lyrics were written by Daniela Petkova and the song was arranged by Jivko Vasilev, provoked by the breakup of the marriage of Daniela and her husband. In August 2018 Duet Mania together with Stara Zagora's Philcharmonic Orchestra were the opening act of Bansko Opera Fest. They opened the first festival night with an "ABBA Tribute" concert. In the fall of 2018, Duet Mania had been invited to take part in the Sofia Song Festival. They performed the song "Biagat minutite" composed and arranged by Stamen Yanev and lyrics are written by Valentina Cenova. In December 2018 the sisters released the new single "Dve v edno", composed and arranged by Rado Minev-RadoRe and lyrics written by Rosen Kukosharov. Featuring guest artists were Duet Mania's father, the guitarist Tasho Petkov and Julia's daughter, the young female rapper Nessy I. "Dve v edno" is a family project which consists of three generations.

On 10 October 2019, Duet Mania celebrated their 20-year anniversary with a spectacular two and a half hour live show held at Music Jam. Featuring guest artists were Akaga, Orlin Pavlov, Yanka Rupkina, Tanya Tingarova, Sly Geralds, Ansambel Chinari, etc. In 2020 Daniela and Julia were invited to participate in an International song project. The song "Native Land" was written and arranged by the Kazakh composer Tolegen Mukhametzhanov and lyrics were written by Shomishbay Sariyev. Singers from 14 different countries became part of the project.

In March 2021, Duet Mania was part of the mini concert tour "Alo, alo slachitze" held in Ruse, Shumen and Varna together with Iskren Petzov and Petia Buiuklieva. All the songs performed at the concerts were written by the composer Dono Tzvetkov. In June 2021 Duet Mania had been invited to participate in the 30th Anniversary Gala Concert of the International Music Festival "Discovery", Varna. On 23 October 2021, Duet Mania in collaboration with Bratia Argirovi released the single "Podarak". The song was written by Dono Tzvetkov, arranged by Krasimir Iliev, lyrics were written by Stefan Stefanov. Producer of the project was Discovery Fondation. "Podarak" quickly captured the hearts of Duet Mania's and Bratia Argirovi's fans and it was the most played song on the radio since its release. In December 2021, Daniela and Julia recorded another Christmas song called "V noshta na Rojdestvo". The music of the song was written by Rado Minev-RadoRe, the arrangement was made by Georgi Parmakov and the lyrics were written by Raina Nedialkova. The song had an acoustic sound because of the simplicity in its arrangement. The piano was recorded by Georgi Parmakov, double bass by Yuri Bojinov, cajon by Biser Ovcharov. In December 2021 Daniela released her 1st poetry book "Popaten viatar". In December 2021, Duet Mania and Bratia Argirovi had been invited to perform at the New Year's Eve Concert of BNT "Novogodishna prikazka". The same year Duet Mania and Bratia Argirovi were part of the charity concert in support of Ukrainian children "Mir, liubov i saprichastnost" held at Borisova Gradina, Sofia.

In April 2022, Daniela and Julia had been invited to be a jury at the children's music festival "Shans", Dimitrovgrad. In June 2022 Duet Mania recorded another children song "Kokiche", written by the composer Dono Tzvetkov, arranged by Krasimir Iliev and lyrics by Raina Peneva. In October 2022 the single "Podarak" had become part of the newest album of Bratia Argirovi ""Kakto vi obichame". In October 2022 Daniela and Julia recorded the single "Az i ti". The music was written by the sisters and the arrangement was made by Dido from Deep Zone Project. Although the canto is written in a funk style, the arrangement has a contemporary electronic music dance sound. The single is unreleased yet. In October 2022 Duet Mania were invited to be a jury at another children's event - the European Children Song Festival "Zlatni Iskri" held in Varna. In November 2022 Duet Mania took part in another mini-concert tour together with Iskren Petzov and Petia Buiuklieva "Hvarchila". At the concerts they had performed children's songs written especially for them by the composer Dono Tzvetkov. On 17 November, Duet Mania released their 3rd album, "Podarak". The album consists of 17 songs. The composers Duet Mania worked with on the new album were: Maga, Stamen Yanev, Alexander Kostov, Rado Minev-Rado Re, etc. Producer of the album is Duet Mania, publisher and distributor - "Riva Sound". The recording and mastering were done by Rosen Stoev, Reptilla Studio. In November 2022 Daniela and Julia gave a concert for the children with disabilities from Center "Radost", Varna and Center "Gradina", Sofia. In December 2022 Duet Mania had been invited to sing at the New Year's Eve Charity Concert of BNT "Novogodishna prikazka".

== Artistry ==
=== Influences ===
The sisters were influenced by Mariah Carey, Whitney Houston, Aretha Franklin, Chaka Khan, Celine Dion, Tina Turner, Gladys Knight, Patti LaBelle, Donna Summer, Michael Jackson, Kool & The Gang, Destiny's Child, Christina Aguilera, Beyoncé and Pink.

Daniela was influenced by the saxophonists – Maceo Parker, Gerald Albright, Eric Marienthal, Michael Lington, Michael Brecker, Kenny G, Candy Dulfer, David Sanborn, John Coltrane, Charlie Parker.

=== Legacy ===
“The ladies of Mania are an amazing singing duet. Full of beauty, talent and grace their voices soothe any room they perform in…couple that with their instrumental talents and you have a dynamic duo. One of the best things imported out of Bulgaria.” Michael Cory Davis – actor and filmmaker

"Daniela and Julia are very beautiful and very talented. They have remarkable voices and when Dani plays the saxophone...that makes their performance extremely sexy.” Sam Krumov, CNN World Sport Producer

“It's not only the beauty and the talent, that the sisters have… It's the magic that they bring on stage with their presence and energy.” Ivelin Atanasov, musician

“Every time they are on stage they sing their hearts out…” Ben Cross, actor

== Personal life ==
=== Family ===
In April 2007, Julia and her husband Emil Dimitrov welcomed their first child, Vanesa Dimitrova. The same year Daniela married the former pianist of the band Latino Partizani, Ivelin Atanasov and the couple moved to New York City. In 2019 Julia and her husband, Emil welcomed their second child - their son, Alexander. Daniela and her husband Ivelin moved back to Bulgaria and after 4 years got divorced.

=== Activism and charity work ===
The sisters were financially supporting an orphanage located in Panagyurishte, Bulgaria. Daniela shared: “I would never forget how I wrote 55 Christmas card wishes for the kids. Every card kept a different message, because I wanted each and every one of them to feel special. We threw a concert for them. We brought them a huge cake with all their favorite sugar heroes on top. I would never forget how happy their faces were…” In 2000 the sisters were part of a series charity concerts "Against AIDS". In 2006 the girls were part of a charity concert held at the National Palace of Culture "Say No To Drugs". In February 2012 Daniela and Julia sang at a fund raising event for "Cycle for Survival" in support of research at Memorial Sloan-Kettering Cancer Center on rare and underfunded cancers. In 2018 Duet Mania gave a charity concert in support of the children with disabilities at "Gradina Vdahnovenie", Bojurishte. In 2022 Daniela and Julia were part of the charity concert "Mir, liubov i saprichastnost" in support of the children of Ukraine, Borisova gradina, Sofia. In 2022 the sisters gave a charity concert in support of the children with disabilities from "Gradina Radost", Varna. In 2022 Duet Mania gave a charity concert in support of the children with disabilities from "Gradina Vdahnovenie", Bojurishte

== Filmography ==
2000	Everyone Has Their Own Path	Themselves	Short movie about their life and music career.
2003	Duet Mania in China	Themselves	Short film about their concerts in China (BNT)
2006	Nothing Like That	Themselves	Enifilm – (TV 3)

== Discography ==
Studio albums

- 1999: Ne e istina
- 2003: Hladni ochi
- 2022: Podarak

Singles

- 1999: "BG rege"
- 2003: "Hladni ochi"
- 1999: "Pesenta na shturcite"
- 1999: "Ne iskam, ne moga"
- 1999: "Ne e istina"
- 1999: "Prodaljavai"
- 1999: "Svetat e za dvama"
- 2003: "Mnogo dalech"
- 2003: "Shte bada tam"
- 2003: "Dajd ot liubov"
- 2005: "Bitter-Sweet"
- 2005: "Whatcha Waiting For"
- 2007: "Ne poznavah teb""
- 2014: "Hiliadi vaprosi"
- 2015: "Ne iskam, ne moga"(remix)
- 2016: "Ako dal si nadejda"
- 2016: "Biala prikazka"
- 2016: "Parva sreshta"
- 2016: "Whatcha waiting for"(remix)
- 2017: "Formata"
- 2017: "Pareshti sledi"
- 2018: "Biagat minutite"
- 2018: "Dve v edno"
- 2018: "Sabudi me"
- 2018: "Tvoia biah"
- 2021: "V noshta na Rojdestvo"
- 2021: "Podarak"
- 2022: "Kokiche"

== Awards and nominations ==
1. 1996 – International Song Festival, Golden Orpheus, Bulgaria – 2nd prize
2. 1999 – International festival for young talents - Melfest, Macedonia – 1st prize
3. 2000 – World Championships of Performing arts, Los Angeles, CA – 1st prize and gold medal
4. 2000 – Art Rock Center, Sofia, Bulgaria - Best duet of 2000
5. 2003 – The Spring Song Contest, radio Horizont” – 3rd prize
6. 2004 – International Song Contest, Universetalent, Prague, Czech Republic – 3rd prize
7. 2004 – International Art and Music Festival – Nan Ning, China
8. 2004 – International Music Festival, Meet in Beijing, China
9. 2005 - International Pop Music Festival, Discovery Varna, Bulgaria - Best performance
10. 2005 – World Championships of Performing Arts, Los Angeles, CA – 1st prize and gold medal
11. 2005 – European Song Contest, Eurovision
12. 2006 – Blues to Bop festival, Lugano, Switzerland
13. 2006 - International Jazz Festival, Bansko, Bulgaria
14. 2017 - National Song Contest "Burgas i moreto", Burgas, Bulgaria
15. 2018 - Sofia Song Festival, Sofia

== Tours ==
- 1999: Bulgaria/Norway/Germany/Denmark
- 2000: Bulgaria/Norway/Germany/Denmark/North Macedonia
- 2001: Bulgaria/Norway/Germany/Denmark
- 2002: Bulgaria/Norway/Germany
- 2003: Bulgaria/Norway/Germany/China
- 2004: Bulgaria/China
- 2005: Bulgaria/South Korea
- 2006: Bulgaria/Switzerland
- 2007: Bulgaria
- 2008: Bulgaria/United States
- 2009: United States
- 2010: Bulgaria/United States/England/Ireland
- 2011: Bulgaria/United States
- 2012: United States
- 2015: Bulgaria
- 2016: Bulgaria
- 2017: Bulgaria/Sweden/Finland
- 2019: Bulgaria
- 2022: Bulgaria/Norway/Germany
