= Theodosii Spassov =

Bulgarian jazz musician (born 1961)

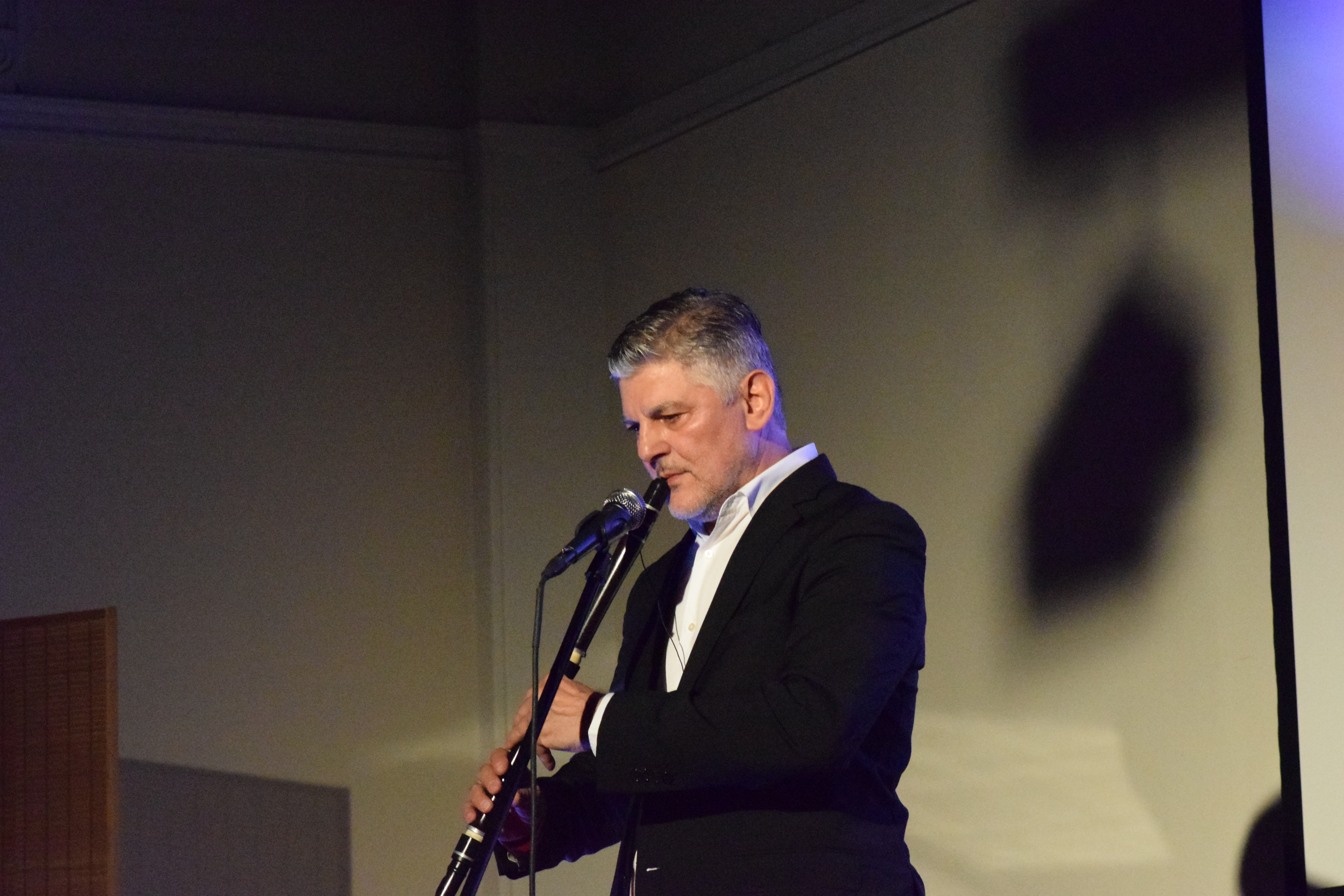
Theodosii Spassov performing in New York in 2022.

Theodosii Spassov Yordanov (Bulgarian: Теодосий Спасов Йорданов, [teoˈdɔsi spɐˈsɔf jorˈdɑnof], born 4 March 1961) is a Bulgarian Folklore and jazz musician who plays kaval. Theodosii Spassov began his early training on the kaval at the Kotel Music School and The Academy of Music and Dance in Plovdiv/Bulgaria. The kaval, an eight-hole wooden "shepherd" flute, is one of the oldest Instruments in Europe, rich in tone and technical possibilities. Theodosii Spassov has developed his own unique style of playing the instrument by synthesizing traditional folklore with jazz, fusion and classical music.

For over 20 years, Theodosii has toured all over Europe, Asia, the Middle East, Australia, Canada and United States. In 1994, he performed with Sofia Women's Radio Choir which was awarded with a Grammy award for "Le Mystere Des Voix Bulgares". In April 1995, "Newsweek" magazine recognized Theodosii Spassov as one of the most talented Eastern-European musicians in its "best of the East" article, noting that "Spassov... is not merely surviving the post-communist cultural wasteland. He has actually invented a new musical genre."

Theodosii Spassov has contributed to 20 CDs, four of his own. He has composed and performed numerous film scores including a French-Bulgarian feature film "Granitza", ("The Border") 1993. Also he recorded themes for films by Italian composers Carlos Siliotto and Ennio Morricone, entitled "An Italian Story" and "The Breakout of the Innocent". At the fourth European Jazz Night, Theodosii Spassov was a featured performer along with other jazz musicians, including Winton Marsalis.

In his native Bulgaria, Theodosii Spassov is a figure of national importance and prominence, and was recently honored with the Musician of the Year Award. He is the Artistic Director of the "PHILIP KOUTEV Ensemble Of Music, Drama And Dance".

Theodosii is a historical member of the Riverdance traditional music and dance company (1998-2001). Currently, he is a solo artist with the Bulgarian National Radio.

== Musical training ==
The Music School in Kotel and The Academy of Music and Dance in Plovdiv.

== Awards ==
The Special Prize of Detroit Flute Festival 1994 The International Academy of Arts in Paris Award 1996 "Music Artist of the Year" at the National Music Awards 1997 and 2002 Apollo Toxophoros for sparkling contribution to Bulgarian music 2001 National Film Centre Annual Awards-"Best film music composer" 2006 "Artist Of Salon Des Arts" 2007 "Dobri Chintulov" for culture activity 2009 "Golden Age" for contribution to Bulgarian culture 2011 "Artist for Peace" named by UNESCO in commitment to highlight music as a force to enhance dialogue among people, cultures and communities. 2015

== Artists he worked with ==
Jazz Linia, "Le Mystere des Voix Bulgares", Trio Bulgarka, National Radio Sofia Orchestras, Ivo Papazov, Yldiz Ibrahimova, Vesselin Nikolov, Milcho Leviev and Katoomi (Karen Briggs, Nedra Wheeler, Tootie Heath), London Chamber Players, Borislav Yotzov, Acoustic Version, Dave Liebman, Dimitrios Vassilakis, Andy Sheppard, Jamey Haddad, Ivan Yanakov (pianist), Albert Mangelsdorf, The Four Pianists, Mark Johnson, Trilok Gurtu, Kazumi Watanabe, Glen Velez, Rabih Abou-Khalil, Matt Darriau, Boyan Zulfikarpasic, Dionisis Savopulos, Paul McCandless, Glen Moore, Billy Cobham, The Shin, Ennio Morricone, Kristjan Järvi, Vlatko Stefanovski, Nayden Todorov, Miroslav Tadić

== Concerts as a soloist ==
Spassov has done concerts in the following countries as a soloist; Argentina, Australia, Austria, Brazil, Canada, Finland, Germany, Greece, Holland, India, Israel, Japan, Nepal, Russia, Spain, Switzerland, Turkey, the U.K. and the U.S..
