= Mariana Popova =

Bulgarian singer (born 1978)

Mariana Popova Мариана Попова
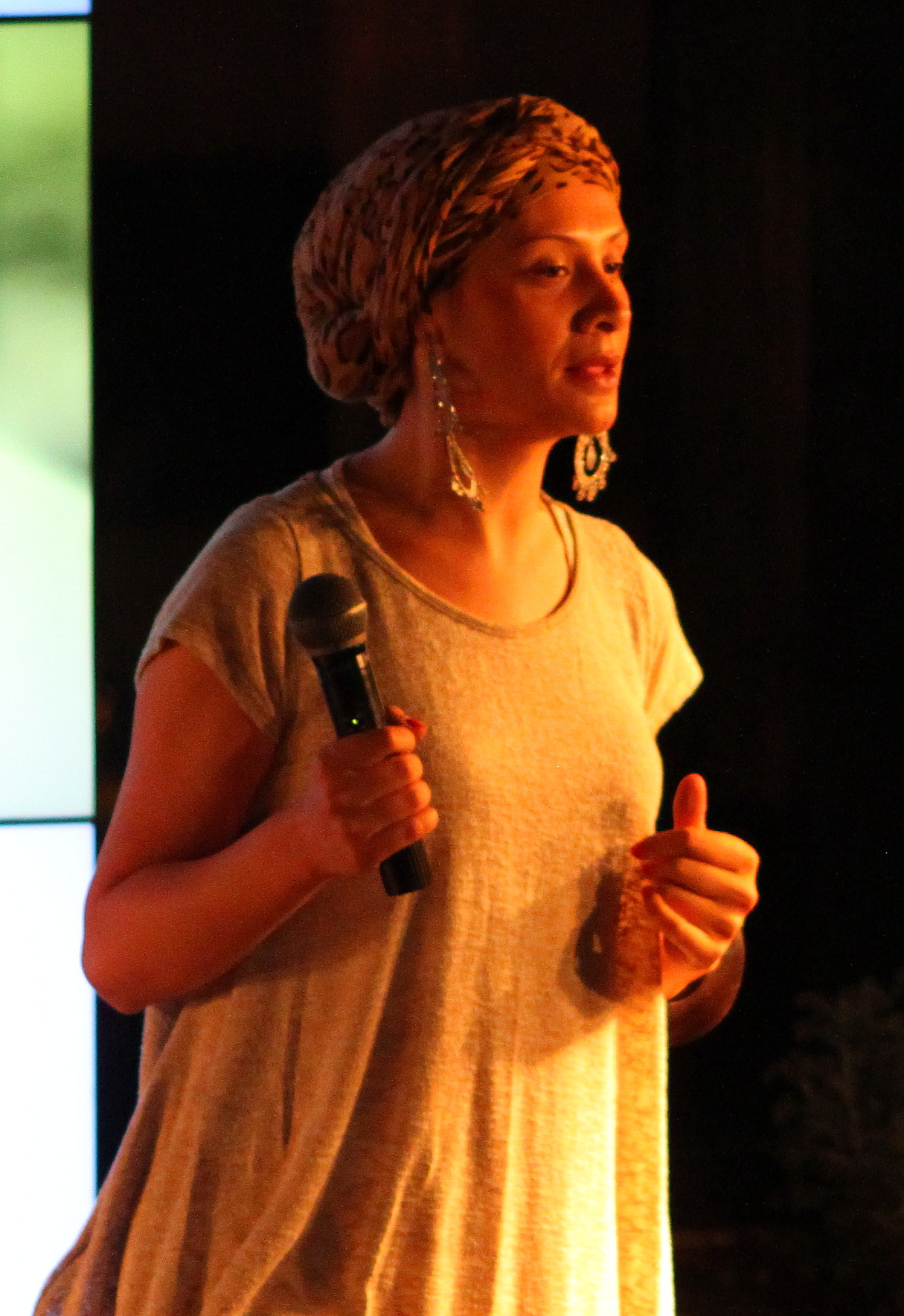

Background information
- Born: 6 June 1978 (age 48)
- Origin: Sofia, Bulgaria
- Genres: Pop, Adult Contemporary, Jazz, World
- Occupation: Singer
- Years active: 1996–present
- Website: www.marianapopova.com

Mariana Popova (Bulgarian: Мариана Попова) (born 6 June 1978) is a Bulgarian singer. She is known for representing Bulgaria at the Eurovision Song Contest 2006, trainer on The Voice of Bulgaria 2011 and from Vip Brother 2012 – Bulgaria.

== Biography ==
Mariana Popova was born in Sofia, Bulgaria on 6 June 1978. She has been studying music since she was 11, and later she also studied modern and jazz ballet. From 1996 until 2000, she was part of the group Cocomania. In 2005 she won the first prize at the "Burgas and the Sea" Festival with the song "Dream About Me," which she performed in a duet with Dani Milev. Mariana says that she dreams of never to stop dreaming, that she appreciates the really talented people, that she believes in herself and in reincarnation and that she would like to have a dinner with the singer Marc Anthony. In 2006, Mariana Popova triumphed at the Bulgarian National Final competition with the song "Let Me Cry", to enter the Eurovision Song Contest 2006. Popova was not voted through semi-finals and thus did not qualify for the final on 20 May.

== Singles ==
- Ти не дойде (You Didn't Come)
- Казах (I Said)
- Можем пак (We Can Do It Again)
- Няма (There Isn't Anything)
- След (After)
- Сънувай ме (Dream About Me)
- Let Me Cry (Остави ме да плача) – with this song Mariana participated in Eurovision Song Contest in Athens.
- Sometimes (Понякога) – Bulgarian version called "Не знам"
- Lejos-song sung in Spanish with the Bulgarian artist Orlin Goranov.
- Остани
- New Religion – Namesake of latest album

== Awards ==
- 2004 – Third Prize at ‘Bourgas and the Sea’ Festival and the special prize of ‘Rotari Club – Bourgas’ with the song ‘After’ / duet with Dany Milev
- 2005 – First Prize at ‘Bourgas and the Sea’ Festival with ‘Dream about me’ / duet with Dany Milev
- 2012 – Best Bulgarian text from BG radio – ‘Чуй ме’ /duet with Orlin Goranov

== Nominations ==
- 2004 – Nomination for ‘Best Female Singer’, BG Radio Annual Music Awards
- 2004 – Nomination for ‘Best Bulgarian Debut’, BG Radio Annual Music Awards
- 2005 – Nomination for ‘Best Female Singer’, MM Television Annual Music Awards
- 2005 – Nomination for ‘Best Female Singer’, BG Radio Annual Music Awards

Awards and achievements
Preceded by Kaffe with "Lorraine"	Bulgaria in the Eurovision Song Contest; 2006	Succeeded by Elitsa Todorova & Stoyan Yankoulov with "Water"
