= Kaffe (band) =

Bulgarian jazz band

- Origin: Bulgaria
- Genres: Jazz
- Years active: 2001– 2006
- Members: Orlin Pavlov; Georgi Yanev; Milen Kukosharov; Valery Tzenkov; Martin Tashev; Veselin Veselinov-Eko

Kaffe (Bulgarian: Каффе) was a Bulgarian jazz band who represented their home country in the Eurovision Song Contest 2005. The group, who sung the song "Lorraine", finished 19th in the semi-final.

== Biography ==
Kaffe represented Bulgaria at their debut in the Eurovision Song Contest 2005 in Kyiv ending 19th in the semi-final and failed to make it to the Finals round. The following year the group disbanded and the members pursued their solo careers.

== Members ==
=== Orlin Pavlov – vocals ===
Orlin Pavlov was born on 23 April 1979 in Sofia and is the son of opera singers. He studied theatrical art and graduated from the University of Drama Arts in the city of Plovdiv.

In 2001 he started his artistic career as a dancer – a profession that took him to many countries, including the Netherlands, Poland, Germany and Egypt, and onto the most famous stages in Europe, such as the Grand Theatre. In 2002, Orlin settled down in Sofia, opened a newspaper and read that Kaffe were searching for a vocalist. This was the beginning of his career as Kaffe’s frontman.

=== Georgi Yanev – guitar ===
He is well known as an award-winning music producer and recording artist. Georgi Yanev was born on 23 April 1977 in Blagoevgrad. When he was a teenager his parents moved to Russia and it was there that Georgi graduated from high school.

The next important step in his life was to pack his things and go to Berklee(USA) to study guitar in the world-famous Berklee College of Music. Georgi came back to Bulgaria in 1999 and – together with Valery Tsenkov – founded the band Badu, which after several transformations became Kaffe. Alongside his career as a musician, Georgi Yanev started to study psychology in Blagoevgrad’s University from which he has now graduated.

=== Milen Kukosharov – keyboard ===
Milen Kukosharov was born on 15 May 1978 in Plovdiv where he graduated from the College of Music. He started his career as keyboard player in a band called Infinity. In the last couple of years Milen has worked with many of the most famous Bulgarian musicians – Theodosii Spassov, Mitko Rupchev and Stefan Valdobrev – and he has been a member of Kaffe since 2002. He still studies at the Music Conservatory in Sofia.

=== Valery Tzenkov – drums ===
Valery Tzenkov, born on 3 September 1973, started to play different instruments when he was a child. He tried piano and guitar but his favourite was drums.

The study of drums brought him to the Music High School in Varna, later the Jazz Academy in Graz (Austria) and finally to the famous Berklee College of Music where he met Georgi Yanev.

Back in Bulgaria, Valery Tzenkov and Georgi Yanev founded the band Badu, which later became Kaffe.

=== Martin Tashev – trumpet ===
Martin Tashev was born on 9 July 1979 in Plovdiv. He graduated from Music College in Plovdic (trumpet) and is currently a student in the Music Conservatory in Sofia.

Together with Milen Kukosharov, Martin Tashev played in the band Infinity and – in 2002 – became a member of Kaffe for whom you can hear him on the trumpet and as a vocalist.

On Kaffe’s debut album, Martin even raps in Spanish.

=== Veselin Veselinov-Eko – bass guitar ===
Veselin Veselinov-Eko was born on 19 October 1963 in Sofia where he graduated from Music Conservatory (bass guitar and double bass).

Veselin has worked with world-famous musicians – amongst them Ivo Papazov, Teodosi Spasov, Vasko Vasilev, Benny Paupin, Anatoli Vapirov, Yildiz Ibrahimova and Okay Temiz.

Veselin Veselinov-Eko is also a composer and music producer. He is the newest member of Kaffe.

The song "Lorraine," with which Kaffe represented Bulgaria in the 2005 Eurovision Song Contest, was written and composed by Veselin together with Orlin Pavlov.

Awards and achievements
Preceded by None	Bulgaria in the Eurovision Song Contest; 2005	Succeeded by Mariana Popova with "Let Me Cry"
