= The Four Pianists =

Bulgarian classical/jazz piano quartet

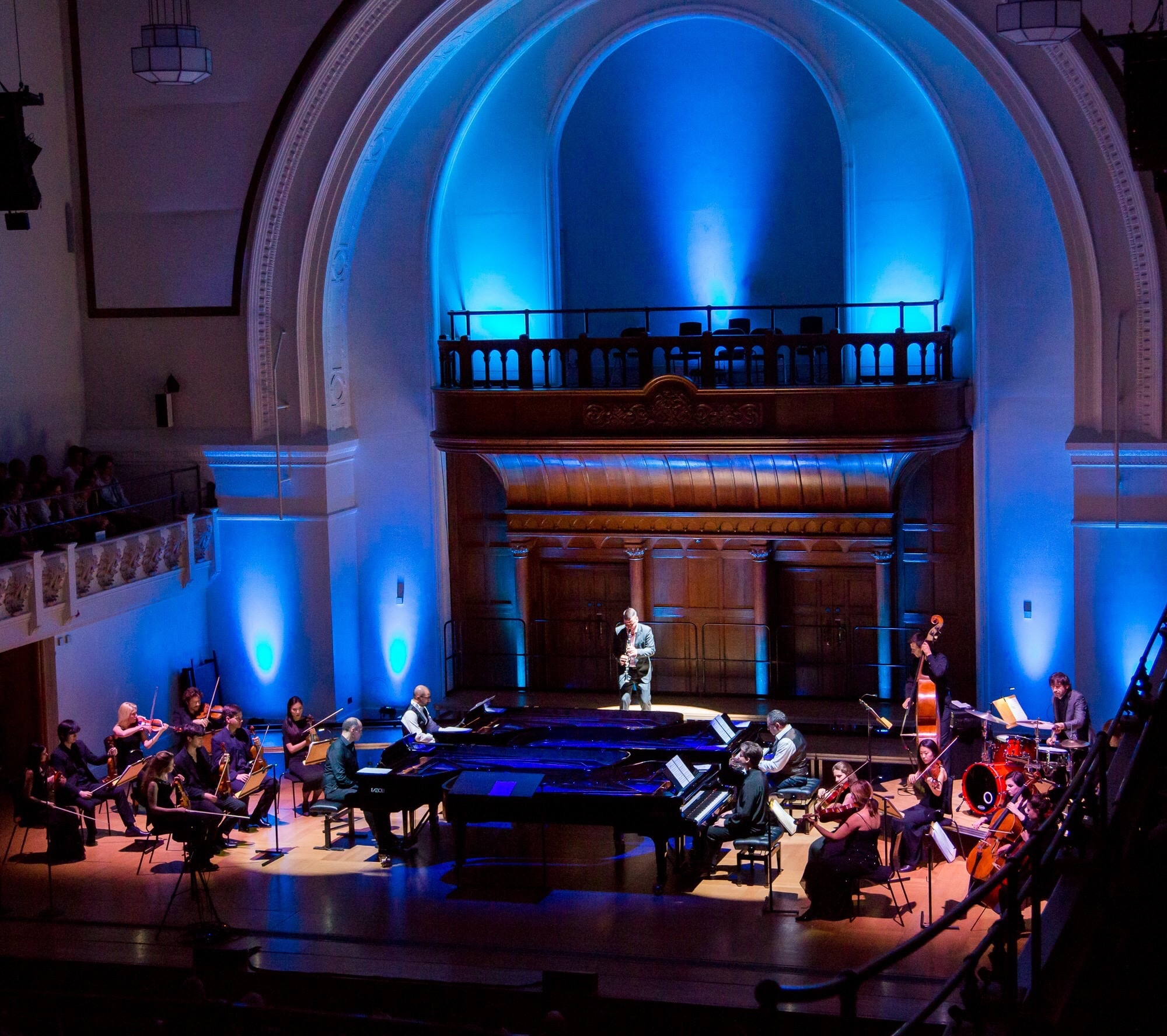
The Four Pianists performing at Cadogan Hall in London

The Four Pianists is an ensemble consisting of two classical and two jazz pianists.

Members of The Four Pianists are Ivan Yanakov (pianist), Georgii Cherkin, Jivko Petrov and Antoni Donchev who in 2022 replaced Angel Zaberski. The Four Pianists regularly perform in Bulgaria's National Palace of Culture in front of 4,000-strong audiences. In 2016, the Four Pianists and the London Chamber Players played at London's Cadogan Hall, alongside Theodosii Spassov. In 2017 the Four Pianists performed a special concert at the Philharmonic Hall in Ljubljana.
