= Triphon Silyanovski =

Bulgarian musician (1923–2005)

Triphon Silyanovski, (Bulgarian: Трифон Силяновски) (December 16, 1923 – May 19, 2005), born in Sofia, Bulgaria, was a Bulgarian composer, pianist, pedagogue and musical theoretician. He died at the age of 81.

== Life and career ==
Triphon Silyanovsky graduated both from the Law Faculty of Sofia University and from the State Academy of Music, Sofia majoring in Composition under Professor Pancho Vladigerov and in Piano under Professor Dimitar Nenov. He also studied History of Art and Stylistics with Hans Sedlmayr in Vienna (1941–43). In 1948, he won the first Bulgarian Singers’ and Instrumentalists’ Competition, an event that resulted in a number of recordings for the Bulgarian National Radio’s Golden Fund.

After the instauration of the communist regime in 1944, his professional career was interrupted and his music was banished up to 1959. He was persecuted by the authorities for political reasons and was sent to a concentration camp (1949–51); he was periodically jailed thereafter and was exiled from Sofia. He got a living as a labourer, played the piano in restaurants and taught Latin and Ancient Greek. Not until 1959 was he allowed to work as an accompanist at Sofia Opera.

In 1973, Silyanovsky co-founded, with the director Plamen Kartalov, the Blagoevgrad Chamber Opera where he worked as music director until 1982. He then taught Score Reading at Plovdiv Academy of Music and Dance Art (1982–91). Some of his private pupils include pianists Vassil Genov and Ivan Yanakov (pianist)

After the fall of the communist regime at the end of the 1980s he joined the staff of the State Academy of Music in Sofia and was made professor extraordinary (1997).

Triphon Silyanovsky composed three symphonies; three concertos for string orchestra, piano concerto and other orchestral works; choral opuses; chamber and solo songs. Thematic material is often related to Orthodox chant. His professionally crafted scores are distinguished by an individual style, rigorous structural clarity, dense textures and complex polyphony.

He authored books, studies and over 70 unpublished research works in the field of philosophy, aesthetics, theology, art history, political sciences, but also on problems related to music interpretation.

== Selected music works ==
=== For symphony orchestra ===
- Symphony No 1 (1952)
- Symphony No 2 (1954)
- Symphony No 3 (1972)
- Piano Concerto (1968)
- Byzantine Triptych (1969)

=== For string orchestra ===
- Prelude, Aria and Toccata (1946)
- Variations on a theme B-A-C-H (1952)
- Variations on a theme by Gluck (1970)
- Concerto for string orchestra No 1 (1953)
- Concerto for string orchestra No 2 (1955)
- Concerto for string orchestra No 3 (1956)

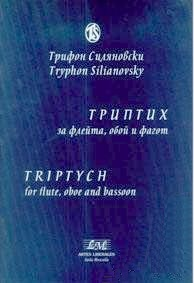

=== Chamber music ===
- Sonata for oboe and piano (1956)
- Sonata for violoncello solo (1965)
- Sonata for violin solo No 1 (1966)
- Sonata for violin solo No 2 (2002)
- Sonata for viola solo (1967)
- Triptych for flute, oboe and bassoon
- Five miniatures for piano

=== Vocal music ===
- Five songs for soprano and piano (left hand), based on poems by Rainer Maria Rilke (1953)

=== Choral music ===
Musica sacra catholica:

- Missa Ordinaria (1954)
- Te Deum (1956; revised, 1996)
- Stabat Mater (1963)

== Selected books (published in Bulgarian) ==
- Idea. Faith (Sofia, 1992)
- The German Symphonism. Style and Interpretation Problems (Sofia, 2000)
- Art in Time. Life Rhythm in Art and Thought. Vol. 1 (Sofia, 2002)
