= Deyan Nedelchev =

Deyan Angeloff
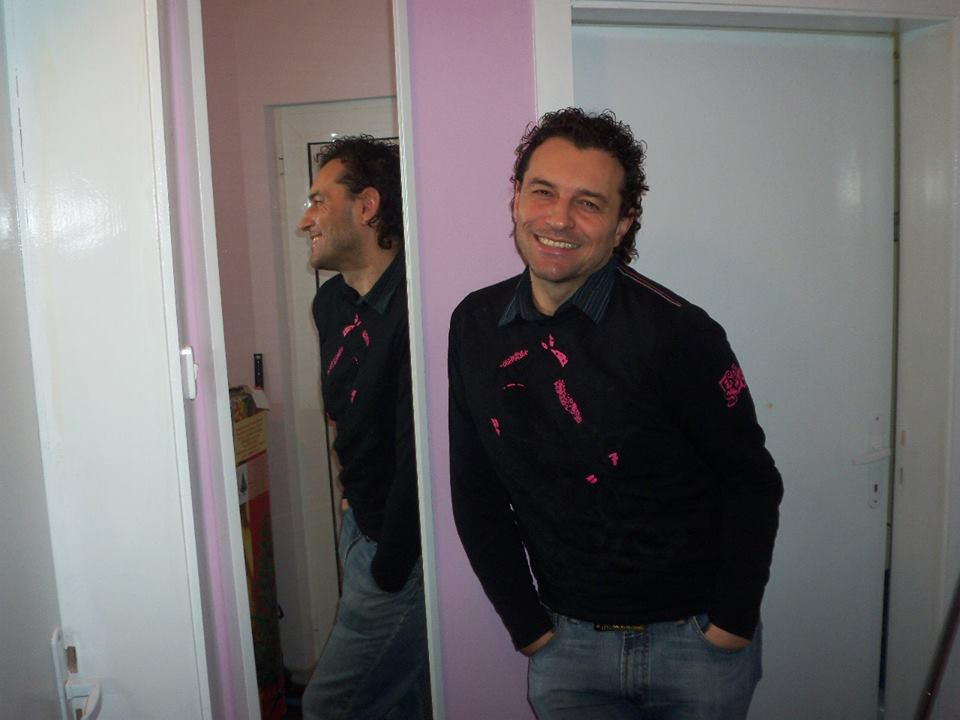

Background information
- Born: Deyan Angeloff Nedelchev; 16 January 1964 (age 62); Ruse, Bulgaria
- Origin: Bulgaria
- Genres: Pop, jazz, R&B, funk, soul
- Instruments: Vocals, keyboards
- Years active: 1979–present
- Labels: Balkanton, Riva Sound, PolyGram, BG Company, Orphictone

Deyan Nedelchev (Bulgarian: Деян Неделчев; born 16 January 1964) is a Bulgarian pop singer, showman and composer. He has issued 19 albums and 9 maxi singles, including projects with his colleagues, some with his brother Boyko. He won the Grand-prix at the Golden Orpheus international festival in 1993 at the contest for new Bulgarian pop songs with the song 'Dedication'. Deyan is the only Bulgarian singer to record an album with Polygram, with whom he had a 3-year contract based in Johannesburg, South Africa. He has released his last four albums in Japan with a company Orphictone.

Outside Bulgaria the singer prefers to use his surname Angeloff and he is known as Deyan Angeloff.

== Biography ==
Deyan was born in Ruse, Bulgaria, in 1964. He began to sing when he was 3 years old. In 1979 he was encouraged by winning a "young talent" prize in Ruse. One year later Deyan won second prize in the same contest. In 1981 Deyan and his group 2+1 won the runner-up prize in the young talent festival in Ruse. Later he became lead vocalist of the bands "Heros", "Helios", ensemble "Magistrali" and the Ensemble of The Bulgarian Construction Forces. In April 1988 Deyan and the Ensemble of The Bulgarian Construction Forces took part in the Pop Song Competition in Sofia. In 1989 he won the prize of the Bulgarian Conservatory at the festival "Rock Under The Stars" in Primorsko. In 1989 he recorded his biggest hit – "Love For Love" ("Обич За Обич). This song won the prize of the Bulgarian Writers' Union in the radio-contest "Spring 1989". The song was included in the chart "500 Greatest Bulgarian Songs". In April 1990 Deyan and the Ensemble of Bulgarian Construction Forces were on tour in the Soviet Union. The same year Deyan participated in "The Golden Orpheus" pop song competition. Balkanton released his first single – "A Plea to the World". In 1993 he won Grand-prix of the International Pop Song Festival "The Golden Orpheus" as a performer of song in the contest for new Bulgarian pop songs. In 1994 Nedelchev won 1st and 2nd prizes for Bulgarian pop song in the same festival. In 1995 Deyan took part in the 5th festival "The Voice Of Asia" in Almati and won the 2nd prize. In 1996 he and Margarita Hranova performed the song "I Made You into A Song" in "The Golden Orpheus". The same year he and his brother Boyko won the prize "Duet of Bulgaria". In 1997 Deyan signed a three-year contract with PolyGram for 3 years. He now prefers to use his middle name Angeloff. With Polygram he released the album "Grande Amore". Later he took part in music festivals in Egypt and moved to South Africa. In April 2000 Deyan and Boyko won silver medal and golden cup at the music festival in North Korea. Then Deyan was vocalist of Art Studio Voin and the rock group BG Rock. In 2001 Deyan and Boyko recorded the song "Ikebana". This song become an internet hit in 2010. In 2003 Deyan lived and worked in Canary Islands where he performed in a Bee Gees tribute show. In 2004 his song "Sweet Love" was nominated by Bulgarian National Radio for best lyrics. In 2006 he took part in the Eurovision song contest and his song reached the semi-finals. In the summer of 2010 he recorded his new single "In The Forest". In April 2012 Deyan released his album – "The Old Man". In November 2012 his song with Bulgarian DJ Kris Master "Your Life Is So Good" entered the "Beat 100" chart.

== Discography ==
- "Greetings From Struma" – 1987 (single), vinil-BALKANTON
- "A Plea To The World" – 1990 (with Margarita Hranova, and Orlin Goranov), LP-VINIL-BALKANTON
- "Deyan Nedelchev" – 1990 (single), vinil-BALKANTON
- "A Game Of Love" – 1991; [with Boyko Nedelchev], LP-VINIL-BALKANTON
- "Madly In Love" – 1992 [with Boyko Nedelchev]-LP-VINIL-BALKANTON
- "The Best of Deyan and Boyko Angeloff 1988–1992" – 1992-MC-BALKANTON
- "My misic"/La mia musica/ – 1993 (with Gianni Neri and Massimo Marconi)-LP-VINIL AND MC -BALKANTON AND UNISON RECORDS
- "Love-Dream – Dedication" – 1993 (double album) [with Boyko Nedelchev]-LP-VINIL-BALKANTON
- "Love For Love" – 1993–[with Boyko Nedelchev]-MC-SUBDIBULA
- "La Palestriade" – 1993–/maxi-single/-MC-MEGA MUSICA
- "The Greatest Hits" – 1995–[with Boyko Nedelchev]-MC-MARBLI
- "Atlanta" – 1996 (with Margarita Hranova, Ivelina Balcheva and Orlin Goranov)-MC-BALKANTON
- "Brothers" – 1996–[with Boyko Nedelchev]-CD-BALKANTON
- "Gently News" – 1997–[with Boyko Nedelchev]-CD-RIVA SOUND
- "Grande Amore" – 1998-CD-POLYGRAM, SOUTH AFRICA
- "The Big Ones" – 2001–/maxi-single/-CD-MEGA MUSICA, MC-POLYCOMERCE
- "God, How You Are Beautiful!" – 2002–[with Boyko Nedelchev]-CD-ACSIOR
- "To You" – 2005-CD-CMP
- "Nessun Dorma" – 2008-CD-BG COMPANY
- "The old man" – 2012-CD-BG COMPANY
- "To be" – 2015-CD-BG COMPANY
- "Do not stop!" – 2019 (double album) [with Konstantin Jambazov]-CD-ORPHICTONE, JAPAN
- "Crossin' a red light" – 2019-CD-ORPHICTONE, JAPAN
- "Fly again " – 2022 [with Konstantin Jambazov]-CD-ORPHICTONE, JAPAN
- "I will take my tears from the rapids" – 2022-CD-ORPHICTONE, JAPAN
- "I have wonderful country" – 2025-CD-Deyan Angeloff
- "Cake" – 2026-CD-Deyan Angeloff
- "Circle" – 2026-[with Frank Myonk]-CD-Deyan Angeloff
