= Svetla Protich =

Bulgarian classical pianist and professor of music

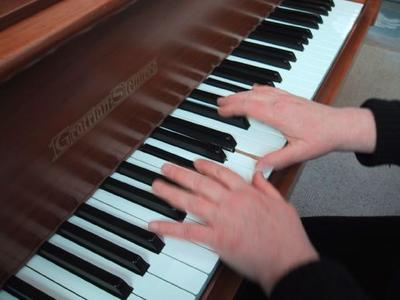
Svetla Protich

Svetla Protich (Bulgarian: Светла Протич), is a Bulgarian classical pianist and professor of music born in 1939.

== Biography ==
Svetla Protich started taking piano lessons at the age of 5 under Prof. Dimitar Nenov, and performed her first solo-recital when she was only 8 years old. At the age of 9 she was offered a membership in the prestigious Bulgarian Union of Performing Artists and Musicians. At 15 she became a full-time piano student at the Sofia Conservatory of Music, and graduated from the same school at 20 years old, with honors. She took her master's degree at the Bucharest Conservatory of Music, with the legendary professor Florica Musicescu (daughter of Moldova-born Romanian composer Gavril Musicescu).

After completing her education, Protich became an active concert pianist. She was a soloist of the Sofia Philharmony and of several other orchestras, and also performed multiple solo recitals. Her performances were recognized in dozens of countries around the world: the former USSR, France, Italy, Poland, Egypt, Norway, Hungary, former Czechoslovakia, the Netherlands, Spain, Japan, United States, etc. In 1981, she made her solo debut in London at Wigmore Hall. In the same year, following an invitation from the Austrian Ministry of Culture, she completed a 1-year professional specialization in the music of Mozart and Schubert: stylistical interpretation and performance.

Into the 21st century, Protich was a professor of piano music at Doshisha Women's College of Liberal Arts, Kyoto, Japan. Together with her work as a scholar, Protich continued to perform actively as a soloist of the Kansai Philharmonic Orchestra, as well as chamber music and solo piano recitals.

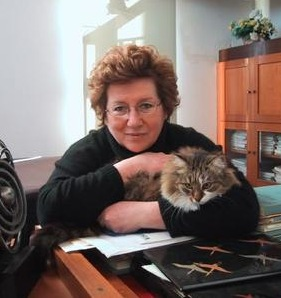
Svetla Protich

== Distinctions ==
- 1st place at two Bulgarian National Competitions, and one International Competition (1968 in Moscow, USSR)
- Laureate of the Order of St. Cyril and St.Methodius for her achievement and contributions to the Bulgarian culture .
- Silver Lyre award by the Union of the Bulgarian Musicians
- prestigious Artist Emeritus title issued by the Government of Republic Bulgaria, for her skilled performances and musical talent.
- Vega Competition (Takarazuka): member of the jury
- Osaka Shanghai Piano Competition (Osaka): member of the jury
- International Chamber Music Competition (Osaka): 3 times a member of the critically acclaimed jury presided by Lord Yehudi Menuhin

== Recordings ==
Svetla Protich recorded with labels such as Harmonia Mundi, Balkanton, Pyramid Records, Nimbus Records, King Records, performing the works of Mozart, Schubert, Mussorgsky, Tchaikovsky, Bach, etc.
