= Dimitar Nenov =

Bulgarian architect and composer (1901–1953)

Dimitar Nenov (Bulgarian: Димитър Ненов; December 19, 1901 in Razgrad – August 30, 1953 in Sofia) was a Bulgarian classical pianist, composer, music pedagogue and architect.

Dimitar Nenov belongs to the Interwar period generation of Bulgarian composers, the so-called Second Generation Bulgarian Composers. Together with Pancho Vladigerov, Ljubomir Pipkov, Petko Staynov, Veselin Stoyanov, Andrey Stoyanov, Assen Dimitrov and Tzanko Tzankov, Nenov was among the founding members of the Contemporary Music Society (founded on 24 January 1933) and became its first secretary. As composer, pianist and architect, Dimitar Nenov was among the key figures of the cultural elite of Interwar Bulgaria well known as one of the most popular public figures.

His first piano teacher was Andrey Stoyanov. In 1920 he went to study in Dresden (Germany) where he studied architecture at the Technische Universität Dresden and music at the Hochschule für Musik Carl Maria von Weber with Karl Fehling (piano), Theodor Blumer and Paul Büttner (composition and music theory). In 1925 Dimitar Nenov obtained the position of Music Director of the Thea Jolles dance company. In 1927 Nenov graduated in Architecture and returned to Bulgaria where he worked for a while as architect at the Ministry of public buildings, roads and public works (1927-1930) and at the General Directorate of Railways (1929–32). Since 1930 he specialized in Railway Service Buildings Architecture in Italy (1932). At the same time he also studied in Zakopane (Poland) at the summer and early fall sessions and master-classes of the noted pianist Egon Petri (himself a student of Ferruccio Busoni). In 1932 he graduated from the Liceo musicale Giovanni Battista Martini - Bologna.

From 1933 to 1943 Nenov obtained the position of Manager and professor of the Private Conservatory in Sofia, and in 1943 he went on to become a professor of piano at the Sofia Conservatoire, where he taught piano to the Bulgarian pianists Genko Genov, Svetla Protich, Lazar Nikolov, Stefan Remenkov, Triphon Silyanovski, and many others. See: List of music students by teacher: N to Q#Dimitar Nenov.
