= Ivan Yanakov (pianist) =

Bulgarian pianist and conductor

- Иван Янъков
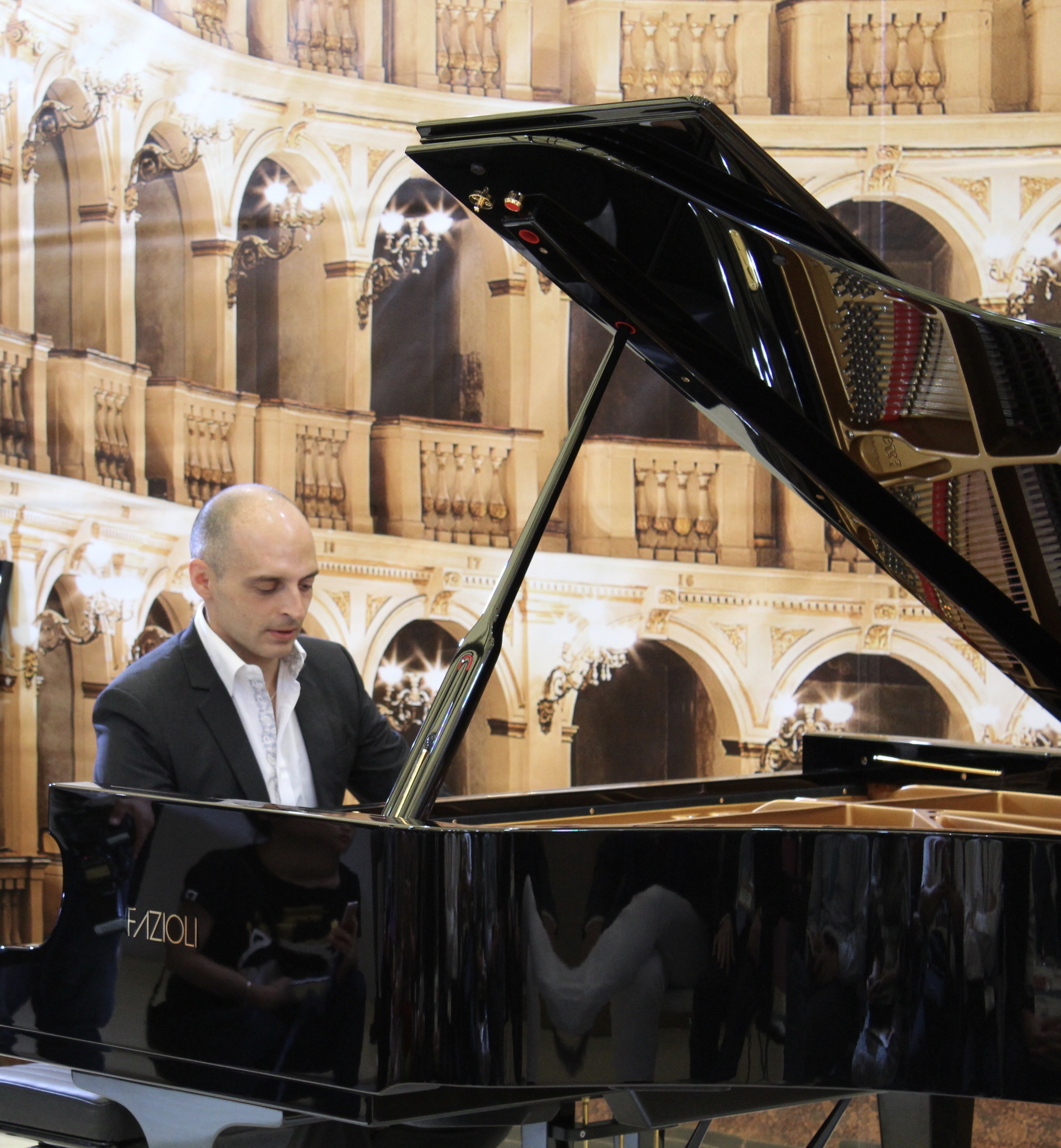
- Yanakov in concert
- Born: Ivan Yanakov; Sofia, Bulgaria
- Education: Mannes College of Music; Accademia Musicale Chigiana
- Occupations: Pianist, conductor
- Website: www.ivanyanakov.com

Ivan Yanakov (Bulgarian: Иван Янъков) is a Bulgarian classical pianist and conductor. He has performed in over 30 countries across five continents: Europe, North America, South America, Asia, and Australia. He is the artistic director and conductor of the London Chamber Players.

As a recitalist, chamber musician, and orchestral soloist, Yanakov has appeared at venues including Carnegie Hall's Recital Hall in New York, Cadogan Hall in London, Sydney Town Hall, Tokyo Metropolitan Theatre Concert Hall, Sapporo Concert Hall, Okinawa Convention Center, Hong Kong City Hall, National Theater and Concert Hall, Taipei, and Shanghai's Oriental Art Center.

In February 2026, his recording of Sergei Rachmaninoff's Piano Concerto No. 3 with the London Symphony Orchestra, conducted by Nayden Todorov, was released worldwide. The album was presented at Bulgaria Hall in Sofia that month.

== Early life and education ==
Ivan Yanakov was born in Sofia into a family of musicians. In Bulgaria, he studied with Meyer Franck and Triphon Silyanovski.

He earned bachelor's and master's degrees in piano performance at Mannes College of Music in New York, where he studied with Arkady Aronov and Stephanie Brown. He also received the Artists International Debut Series Prize at Carnegie Hall.

He also studied with Michele Campanella at the Accademia Chigiana in Siena as a full-scholarship fellow.

== Career ==
Yanakov won the Artists International Debut Series Prize, which led to his solo recital debut at Carnegie Hall's Recital Hall in New York. During his ten years in New York, he performed extensively in recitals and chamber music concerts.

His international career encompasses solo recitals, chamber music and appearances with orchestras. He made his Australian debut in 2018 with recitals in Sydney and Melbourne. In his native Bulgaria, he has performed as a soloist with many of the country's orchestras.

Yanakov is a co-founder of The Four Pianists, a concert project bringing together classical and jazz pianists. Its performances have attracted audiences of several thousand, including concerts in Hall 1 of Sofia's National Palace of Culture. In 2016, The Four Pianists performed at London's Cadogan Hall with the London Chamber Players and Theodosii Spassov. Yanakov is also a co-founder of the Siena Belcanto Festival in Italy and the Irvine Chamber Music Festival in California.

Alongside his work as a pianist, Yanakov made his conducting debut with the Czech National Symphony Orchestra in 2010. In 2011, he founded the London Chamber Players, serving as artistic director and conductor. In November 2025, he began a cycle of Bach's keyboard concertos with the Bulgarian Chamber Orchestra, performing as soloist and conducting from the piano.

Yanakov gives masterclasses in Europe, Asia and South America. His teaching engagements include the Royal Birmingham Conservatoire, Hong Kong Baptist University and the FeMusiK International Music Festival in Brazil. At Stowe School in England, he was a guest artist in the Leslie Huggins Masterclass and Recital Series, giving a masterclass and an evening recital in the Ugland Auditorium. His jury appointments include the Ernest Bloch International Competition at London's Royal College of Music and the inaugural Russian Piano Music International Competition in Sanremo, which he chaired in September 2019.

His recordings, performances and interviews have been broadcast internationally. His recordings have received airplay on national radio in France, Italy and Spain, and have appeared in Radio New Zealand Concert's published schedules. Spain's Radio Clásica featured Franck, Haydn, Rachmaninoff in La dársena in October 2024, and Catalunya Música also featured the album. Rai Radio 3 featured his Rachmaninoff Third Concerto recording in Primo movimento in June 2026. In June 2025, Radio Belgrade 3 devoted an edition of Prostori pijanizma to his interpretations of Franck, Liszt and Rachmaninoff.

His broadcast appearances also include interviews and performances on RTHK's television programme The Works and Radio 4, as well as broadcasts from the Los Angeles County Museum of Art. Bulgarian National Radio has broadcast his performances, including a chamber concert from the Apollonia Festival in 2015.

In 2026, Yanakov's international engagements included a recital at Tainan University of Technology in Taiwan and a piano faculty appointment at the FeMusiK International Music Festival in Brazil. In September, he performed in European Musical Bridges: Piano Conversation with Ivan Yanakov, organised by the Bulgarian Embassy in Jakarta. His October appearances included A Night with Purpose, a benefit recital at Padma Resort Legian in Bali supporting the Bali Children Foundation, and a solo recital as part of the 14th Shenzhen Piano Music Season.

== Recordings and critical reception ==
Yanakov's solo recordings include albums devoted to Beethoven and Liszt. In 2024, Evidence Classics released Franck, Haydn, Rachmaninoff, featuring Franck's Prélude, Fugue et Variation, Haydn's Sonata in A-flat major, Hob. XVI:46, and Rachmaninoff's Variations on a Theme of Corelli. His recording of Rachmaninoff's Third Piano Concerto with the London Symphony Orchestra, conducted by Nayden Todorov, was jointly released by Ivan Yanakov and Palms Music on 27 February 2026.

Reviewing Franck, Haydn, Rachmaninoff for Rondo, Attila Csampai praised Yanakov's tonal refinement and lyrical approach, highlighting the structural clarity of his Haydn and the introspective character of his Rachmaninoff. A review in the French magazine Classica, quoted on his management's website, stated: "It is this aspect of Rachmaninov, delicate but full of life, that Yanakov highlights."

Writing in the French cultural publication Vieille Carne, Stéphane Loison praised the album's virtuosity and range of tonal colours, describing it as exceptional.

In a 2025 assessment for Radio Belgrade 3, Stefan Cvetković praised Yanakov's technical precision and tonal control. Discussing his interpretation of Rachmaninoff's Corelli Variations, he highlighted its inspired characterisation and the clarity with which the pianist conveyed the work's changing moods.

=== Albums ===
- Beethoven: Pathétique, Moonlight, Appassionata (2016).
- Works by Liszt (2019).
- Franck, Haydn, Rachmaninoff (2024), Evidence Classics.
- Rachmaninoff: Piano Concerto No. 3 (2026), jointly released by Ivan Yanakov and Palms Music, with the London Symphony Orchestra conducted by Nayden Todorov.

=== Singles ===
- Chopin: Étude in E major, Op. 10, No. 3, "Tristesse".
- Nikolai Kapustin: Étude, Op. 40, No. 8, "Finale".
- Dobrinka Tabakova: Nocturne.
- Sergei Rachmaninoff: Prelude in G minor, Op. 23, No. 5.
- Dobrinka Tabakova: Nocturne – The 2023 Recording.
- Erik Satie: Gymnopédie No. 1.
