= Tonika =

Bulgarian pop band

Tonika (Bulgarian: Тоника) was a Bulgarian pop music.

== History ==
Tonika was formed in Burgas in 1969 by a graduate of Bulgaria's National Academy of Music, Stefan Diomov. Tonika grew in national recognition and was part of the 1974 New Year’s celebration on Bulgarian National Television. In 1975, the group moved to Sofia and released their debut LP on the Balkan-ton label, which was the national record label.

In 1976 and 1977, Tonika won the Bulgarian national music award Zlatniyat Orfey (Bulgarian: Златният Орфей), or Golden Orpheus, which further confirmed their status as pop stars. In 1978, Tonika released their second LP, which featured many of the best studio musicians in Bulgaria. Tonika won many awards during the yearly music festival in Aytos for over two decades, particularly in the 1970s.

Music has always been important in the culture of this former Iron Curtain republic, and Tonika has a considerable following today. Tonika performed more than 200 concerts per year in the 1970s in addition to their TV appearances, recordings, and rehearsals.

The band is also known as Tonica, Tonica SV, Domino, and Familia Tonica (Tonika Family).

In 1979, almost all of Tonika’s records and taped TV appearances (except a few hidden copies) were destroyed by the Bulgarian government and banned due to a political scandal that occurred during a tour of Western Europe and Asia. The group was forced to disband and they were not allowed to perform for two years.

In 1994, the entire Tonika Family reunited and did four concerts in Burgas and Sofia. In 2000, an album of the music performed at these concerts was released on the StefKos Music Label.

In 2001, the Balkanton label released the compilation LP, The Gold Hits of Bulgarian Classical Pop Music, which included the Tonika favorite, "Let It Be Summer."

== Tonika Family members ==
- Stefan Diomov – producer (1969 to 1986)
- Georgi Naidenov – guitar, vocals (original member of Tonika) (joined Domino 1981)
- Eva Kostadinova-Naidenova – vocals (original member of Tonika) (joined Domino 1983)
- Anastasia Bincheva-Vladowski – vocals (original member of Tonika) (until 1979) (mother of American Idol finalist, Leah LaBelle)
- Yakim Yakimov – guitar, vocals (original member of Tonika) (until 1974)
- Harry Sherikan – guitar, vocals (Tonika 1974 to 1975)
- Ivan Hristov – guitar, vocals (joined Tonika 1975) (joined Domino 1981)
- Krassimir Gyulmezov – vocals (joined Domino 1981)
- Violeta Ivanova-Gyulmezova – vocals (joined Domino 1981)
- Vanya Kostova – vocals (Tonika SV 1981 to 1986)
- Militsa Bozhinova – vocals (joined Tonika SV 1981)
- Ralitsa Angelova – vocals (joined Tonika SV 1981)
- Dragomir Dimitrov – vocals (joined Tonika SV 1981)
- Theodore Shishmanov – vocals (Tonika SV 1981 to 1982)
- Emil Vassilev – vocals (joined Tonica SV 1982)

== Partial discography ==
=== Songs as Tonika ===
- "Lado Le" (1976) S. Dimitrov - Z. Petrov
- "Let It Be Summer" (1977) S. Dimitrov - M. Basheva
- "If I Caress You" (1978) S. Dimitrov - N. Kunchev
- "A Farewell" (1975) S. Diomov - S. Gotzov
- "Sea" (1975) M. Ganeva - A. Yordanova
- "Day after Day" (1976) M. Ganeva - P. Stoykov
- "Light" (1974) D. Mihaylov - N. Andreev (cover of "Sugar Baby Love" in Bulgarian)
- "My Friend" (1974) S. Gotzov - K. Dragnev (cover of "Amazing Grace" in Bulgarian)

=== Songs as Tonica SV ===
- "My Girl and I" (1981) S. Diomov - V. Vulchev
- "Like a Dream" (1981) S. Diomov - M. Belchev - P. Slavchev
- "The Boy from the Barge" (1981) D. Kerelezov - N. Troshanov
- "Auld Lang Syne" (1983) Scottish folk song on lyrics by R. Burns (Bulgarian translation by V. Svintila)
- "If We Could" (1983) A. Yossifov - D. Damyanov - S. Marinov
- "Malayka" (1983) Tanzanian folk song (arranged by S. Diomov)
- "Oh, Malyao" (1983) Portuguese folk song (arranged by S. Diomov)
- "No Problems" (1987) M. Stoyanov - H. Yotsov

=== Songs as Domino ===
- "This Wonderful World" (1985) by Czesław Niemen, words by E. Mihailova (arranged by K. Gyulmezov)
- "A Window Still Alight" (1983) Y. Popov - D. Kerelezov - I. Kutikov
- "Modern and Retro" (1983) G. Naidenov
