= Vanya Kostova =

Bulgarian singer (1957–2021)

- Ваня Костова
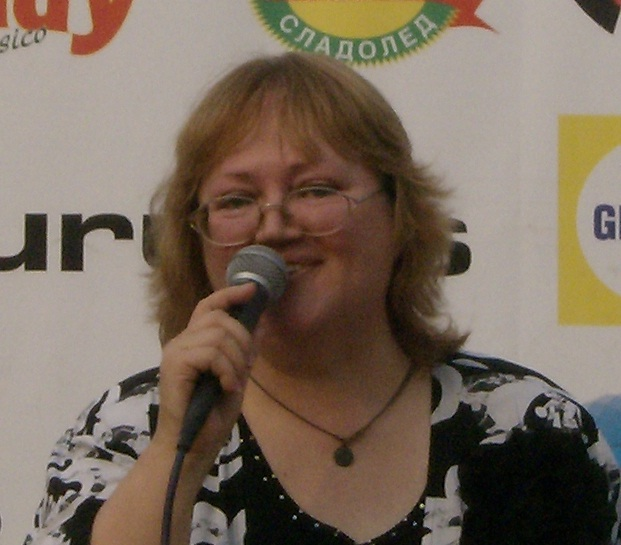
- Kostova in 2011
- Born: 18 April 1957; Dimitrovgrad, Bulgaria
- Died: 6 May 2021 (aged 64); Sofia, Bulgaria
- Occupation: Singer

Vanya Kostova Kostova (Ваня Костова Костова; 18 April 1957 – 6 May 2021) was a Bulgarian singer active from 1980 until 2021. Between 1981 and 1986 she was a member of Tonika SV. One of the songs won the television contest "Melody of the Year '81". Bulgarian television and radio broadcast the song repeatedly, making the band more popular. In 1982 the first album was released. Kostova became the solo singer of the band. In 1983 the second album was released. In 1986 she recorded her last song with Tonika SV and began her solo career releasing her first solo album in 1987. In 1991 she released her second album.

Kostova contracted COVID-19 in April 2021. She died from a heart attack in Sofia a month later on 6 May 2021, aged 64. Her body was cremated.
