= Dimitrios Vassilakis =

Greek musician and poet (born 1961)

Dimitrios Vassilakis Δημήτρης Βασιλάκης
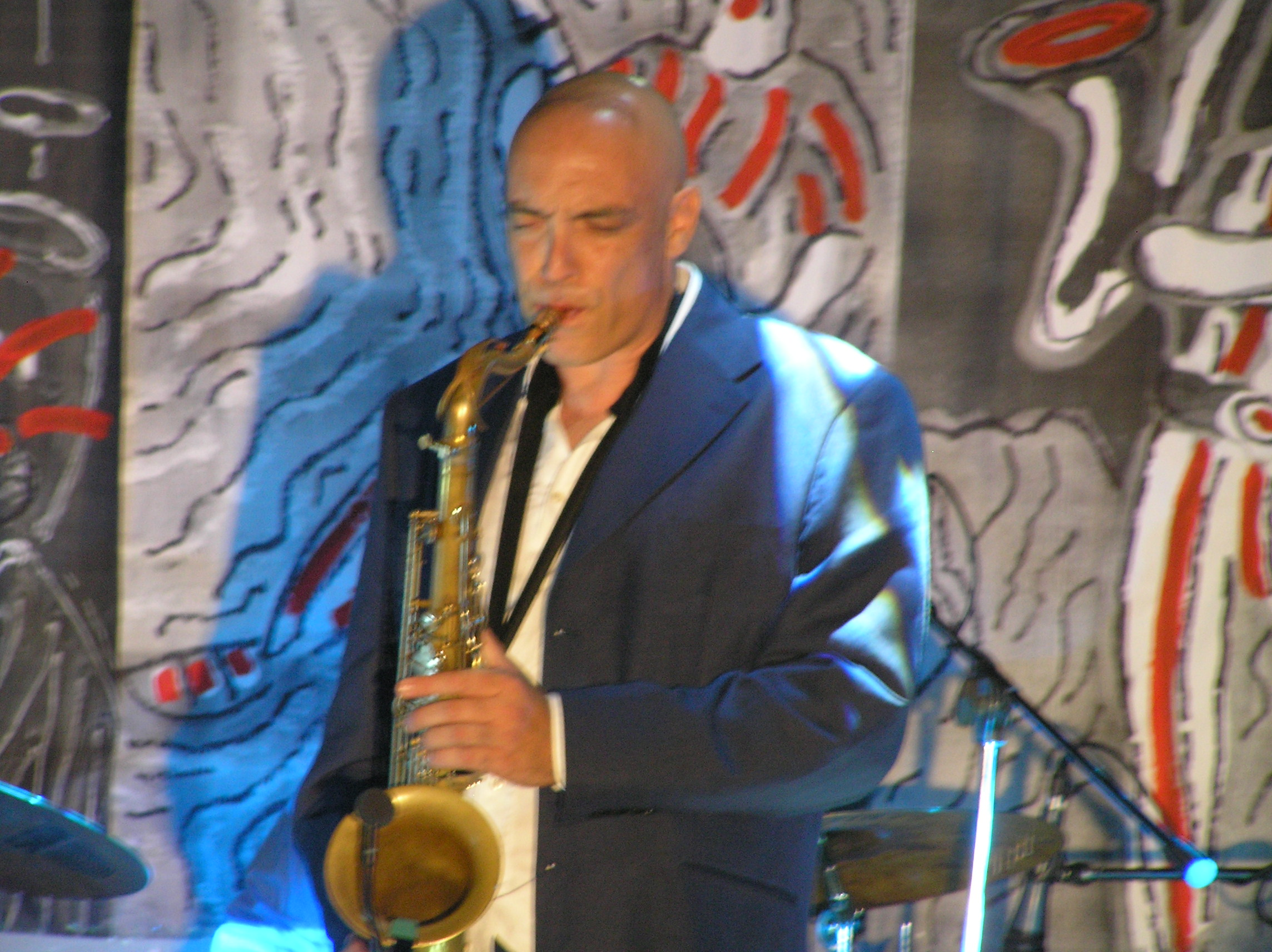

Background information
- Born: October 21, 1961 (age 65); Athens, Greece
- Genre: Jazz
- Occupations: Musician, composer, educator
- Instrument: Saxophone
- Years active: 1990s–present
- Label: Candid Records

Dimitrios Vassilakis (Greek: Δημήτρης Βασιλάκης; also credited as Dimitri or Dimitris Vasilakis; born 21 October 1961, Athens) is a Greek jazz saxophonist, composer and educator. He has released several recordings on Candid Records and has performed internationally across Europe and the United States.

== Early life and education ==
Vassilakis was born in Athens in 1961. He initially studied chemical engineering at the National Technical University of Athens, earning a bachelor's degree, before transitioning to music. He continued his education in London, studying saxophone, piano and composition at the London College of Music under an Onassis Foundation scholarship and subsequently at the Royal Academy of Music.

== Career ==
Vassilakis has performed at international jazz venues and festivals, including Birdland in New York, the Vortex in London and the Lycabettus Theater as part of the Athens Festival.

Throughout his recording career, Vassilakis has released albums on Candid Records. His 2001 album, Daedalus Project – Labyrinth, was named Album of the Month by BBC Music Magazine in March 2002 and was voted second in their year-end jazz poll. His album Parallel Lines (2005) received coverage in jazz publications including All About Jazz, DownBeat, JazzTimes and the Italian magazine Suono, with New York Press describing his playing style as reflecting post-Coltrane and post-Rollins influences.

In addition to club and festival dates, Vassilakis presented Jazz Among the Greek Gods at the Smithsonian Institution in Washington, D.C. in 2007, and performed with his quartet at Dizzy's Club Coca-Cola at Jazz at Lincoln Center in 2013. In 2018, he presented his "Jazz Democracy" concept at the United Nations in New York for International Jazz Day. He is also a co-founder and artistic director of the Rhodes & South Aegean International Jazz Festival, established in 2015.

== Academic activity ==
Vassilakis conducts research on jazz improvisation and computational approaches to music analysis. He presented his work "Jazz Mapping: An Analytical and Computational Approach to Jazz Improvisation" at the Sound and Music Computing Conference and co-authored a 2023 presentation on solo analysis frameworks for the Audio Engineering Society conference in New York. From 2017 to 2023, he served as a lecturer in the "Jazz and New Technologies" postgraduate program at the National and Kapodistrian University of Athens. His artistic and educational projects have also received support from the Onassis Foundation.

== Poetry ==
Vassilakis has published three poetry collections: 88 en Kinisi (Aition, 2016), Anacoda (Gabriilidis, 2018) and Magiko Chali (Iolkos, 2024). His poetry has received coverage in Greek literary publications, including Culturebook.gr and Monocle Read.

== Discography ==
- Secret Path (1998)
- Labyrinth – Daedalus Project (2001)
- Parallel Lines (2005)
- Across the Universe (2010)
- Jazz for Bentley (2011)
- Labyrinth – Daedalus Project – Remastered & Live at Birdland (2022)
