= Kali (Bulgarian singer) =

Kali Кали
- Birth name: Galina Dimitrova Ivanova
- Born: 2 October 1975 (age 49); Sofia, Bulgaria
- Genres: Pop folk, Folk
- Occupation: singer
- Years active: 1998 - present
- Labels: Bulgarian Music Company, Sunny Music, Ara Music, Payner

Galina Dimitrova Ivanova (Bulgarian: Галина Димитрова Иванова), known professionally as Kali (Bulgarian: Кали) is a Bulgarian singer. She was born in October 1975 in Sofia. She has three children. She's best known for her 1998 song "4–4–2" . It was a huge hit in the country due to Bulgaria's first appearance in the FIFA World Cup since 1994. Ivanova explained that the idea of the song was to give a motivational push to the Bulgarian team, and openly dislikes it. Kali has seven studio albums, one collaborative album and one compilation album, all under different labels. She is signed to Payner since 2010.

== Discography ==
=== Studio albums ===
- Vzemi me (1998)
- Parfyumat (1999)
- Razgday mi (2000)
- Edno mersi (2002)
- Za teb (2004)
- Sheto chuvstvo (2006)
- Silna (2012)

=== Duet albums ===
- Dve v edno (with Romski Perli Orchestra; 1998)

=== Compilation albums ===
- The Best of – Remiksiray me (2008)
