= Orlin Pavlov =

Bulgarian singer and actor (born 1979)

Orlin Pavlov Орлин Павлов
- Born: Orlin Orlinov Pavlov; April 23, 1979 (age 47); Sofia, Bulgaria
- Genres: Pop, Jazz
- Occupations: Singer, Actor
- Years active: 1998–present
- Formerly of: Kaffe

Orlin Orlinov Pavlov (Bulgarian: Орлин Орлинов Павловborn April 23, 1979) is a Bulgarian singer and actor.

== Music and Acting career ==
In 2002, Orlin Pavlov was invited to become the lead singer of the pop group Kaffe. Kaffe was the first Bulgarian band to represent the country in the Eurovision Song Contest 2005 in Kyiv, Ukraine, with the song "Lorraine," which placed 19th in the semi-final with a total of 49 points.

In 2006, Orlin Pavlov launched his solo career with the song "Dream On," followed by numerous collaborations with Bulgarian singers, composers, and producers.

He participated in Dancing with the Stars in 2008 and VIP Brother in 2012, winning both reality shows. In 2010, he also hosted one of the daily shows on Pro.BG TV. In 2009, he was selected as a juror for VIP Dance Bulgaria.

In 2015, Orlin Pavlov served on the jury for the Junior Eurovision Song Contest, which was held in Bulgaria for the first time.

His 2014 US tour was a success and included the cities of Chicago, Los Angeles, Las Vegas, New York, Cape Cod, and Atlanta. In 2016, he participated in the third season of the Bulgarian version of Your Face Sounds Familiar, where celebrity contestants impersonate famous singers. In addition to his singing career, Orlin Pavlov has also pursued acting.

He appeared in the bTV comedy series House Arrest (Bulgarian: Домашен арест) and the Nova TV series Reward (Bulgarian: Отплата).

In 2014, he played the leading role in Nikolay Iliev's film Living Legends (Bulgarian: Живи легенди).

In 2016, Orlin Pavlov provided the voice-over for the lead character Max in the Bulgarian dub of the Disney movie The Secret Life of Pets (Bulgarian: Тайният живот на домашните любимци).

In 2017, he also voiced the Beast in the Bulgarian dub of the Disney movie Beauty and the Beast (Bulgarian: Красавицата и Звяра).
