= London Chamber Players =

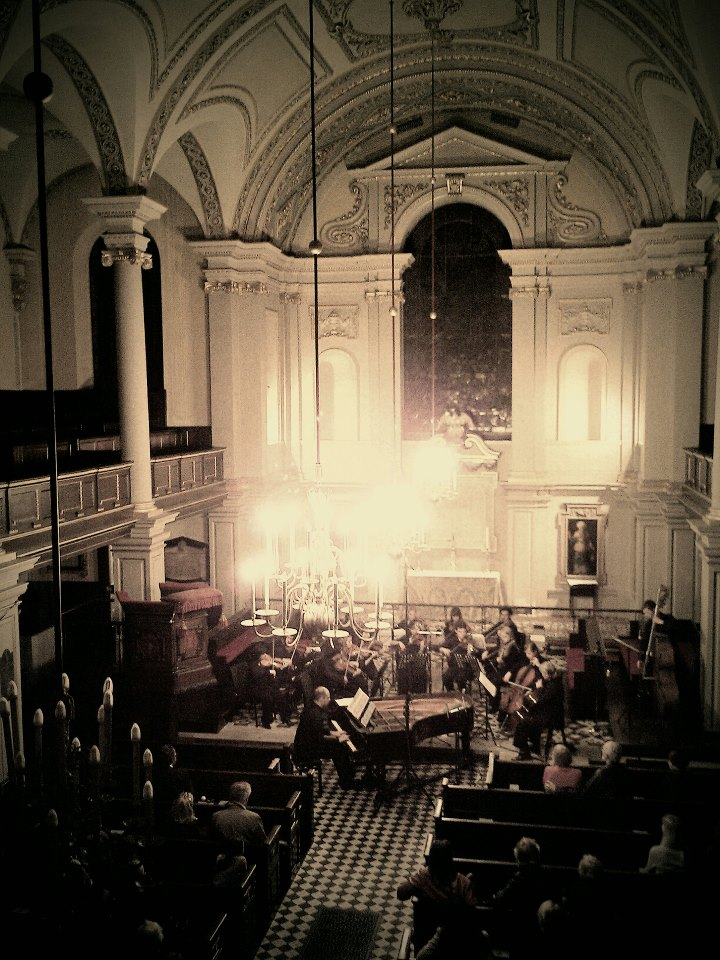
London Chamber Players in concert in London, with Ivan Yanakov conducting them from the keyboard

The London Chamber Players is a London-based classical music ensemble founded by Bulgarian-born pianist Ivan Yanakov in 2011. The orchestra has performed to critical acclaim in Madrid, Cadogan Hall in London, the Guiting Festival in the Cotswolds, and regularly in London.
