= Orlin Goranov =

Bulgarian pop singer (born 1957)

Orlin Goranov Орлин Горанов
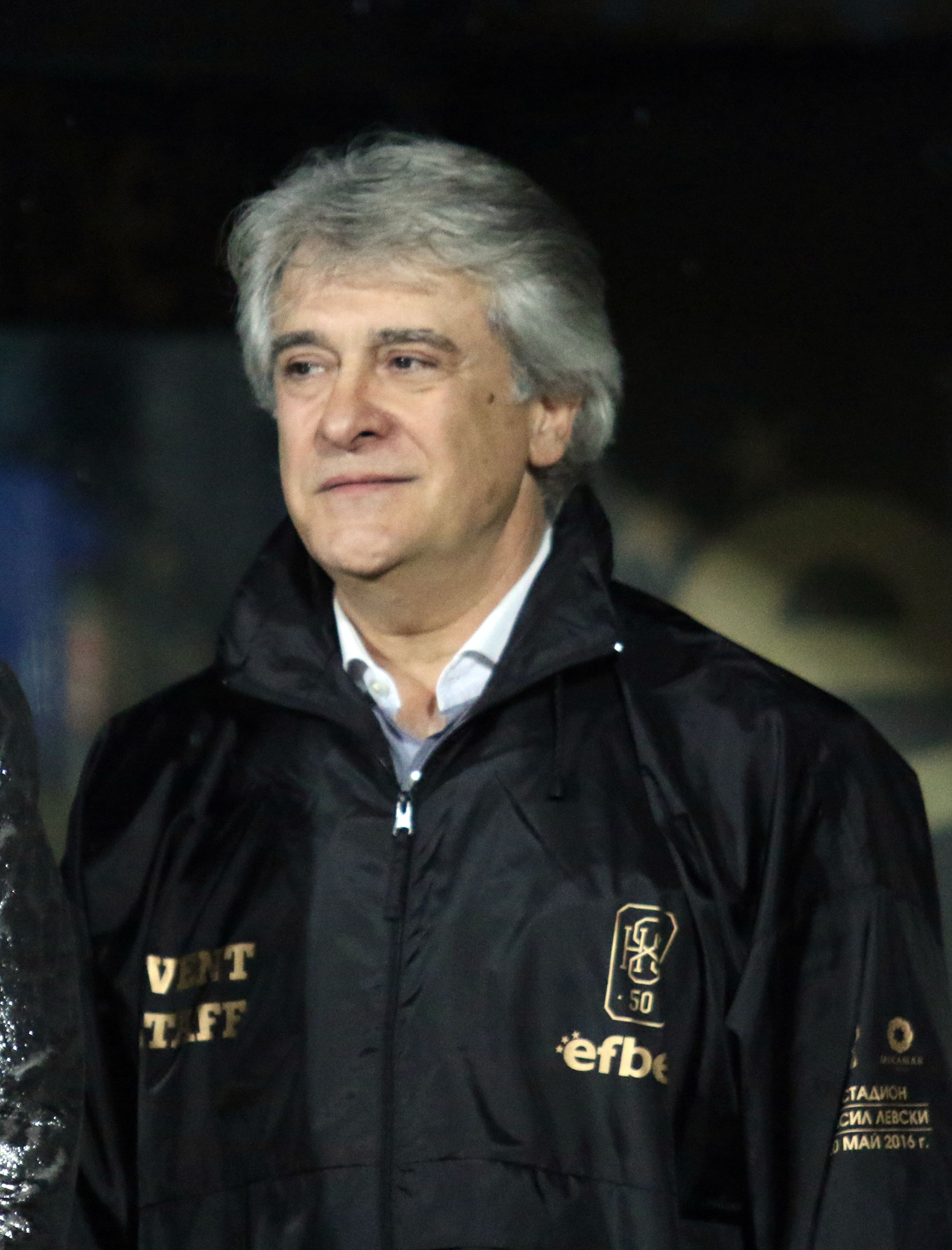

Background information
- Born: 8 August 1957 (age 68); Berkovitsa, Bulgaria
- Genres: Pop, Opera
- Occupations: Singer, actor
- Years active: 1977–present

Orlin Aleksandrov Goranov is a Bulgarian pop, opera singer and TV presenter. Since the 1980s, he established himself as one of the most successful performers on the Bulgarian stage.

== Biography ==
Orlin Goranov is born on 8 August 1957 in Berkovitsa, Bulgaria. He is a famous Bulgarian pop, opera singer and TV presenter. Since the 1980s, he established himself as one of the most successful performers on the Bulgarian scene.

He is a graduate of the "Bodra Smyana" choir. His musical gift and magnificent vocal data were discovered by Stefan Diomov during his military service in the GUSV Ensemble, whose soloist he remained until 1985.

During the years in which the "Melody of the Year" contest was held, it was one of the leading ones (since 1986). In the 80s and 90s, his duet with Christina Dimitrova was particularly popular.

Already at his debut at the "Youth Fun Song Contest" in 1978, he won "First Prize" - with the song "Intimate" he presented (music by Stefan Diomov).

In the next few years, he established himself among the leading singers in Bulgarian popular music, called at that time pop music. His collaboration with Alexander Brzytsov also contributed to the creation of his elegant style.

One of his emblematic performances is the song "The world is for two" with music by Maria Neikova and lyrics by Dimitar Tochev, and among his international awards he received in the early 1980s are: "First prize" at the "Schlagerfestival" in Dresden, "Third Prize" of "Intertalant" in Prague], Grand Prize "Golden Orpheus", etc.

He graduated from the Faculty of Music of the Bulgarian State Conservatory in 1990 in the class of Konstanza Vachkova. Since 1989, he has been a soloist of the Plovdiv Opera.

He has had permanent engagements at the Friedrichstadtpalace in Berlin, Germany since 1994. He has played the tenor parts in many Italian operas: La Traviata, The Troubadour, Aida, Rigoletto and Otello by Giuseppe Verdi, La Boheme and Madame Butterfly by Giacomo Puccini and others. At that time, he maintained his popularity in Bulgaria mainly through his duet with Kristina Dimitrova, with whom he released several albums.

Performed concert tours in the USSR, GDR, Austria, Italy, Spain, Hungary, Czechoslovakia, etc.

In 2004, Goranov was one of the soloists in a new digital recording of the Bulgarian national anthem, Mila Rodino, made at Bulgaria Hall in Sofia on 29 September 2004. The recording also featured Raina Kabaivanska, Nikola Ghiuselev and Roberta as soloists, with the Sofia Philharmonic Orchestra and the National Philharmonic Choir under Nayden Todorov; the arrangement was by Tsenko Minkin.

In 2010, he starred in the film "Mission London" as the President, one of the main characters. Orlin Goranov is also involved in public activities. In 2009, he became a member of the Knights Templar Order.

In 2017, she started a concert tour "I love Bulgarian music" (in Bulgarian: "Обичам българската музика") together with her colleague Margarita Hranova, accompanied by the Pleven Philharmonic and State Opera - Burgas. The idea and script is by Yulia Manukyan, as well as Levon Manukyan (conductor), Daniel Zhelev (percussion) and Ivo Dukov (piano). They realize over 50 concerts throughout the country.

Music for it was written by Zornitsa Popova, Toncho Rusev, Maurice Alajem, Maria Neikova, Stefan Diomov, Alexander Yosifov, Alexander Brzytsov, Kristiyan Boyadjiev, Vili Kazasyan, Ivan Peev, Atanas Kosev and many others.

From 7 September 2020 to September 2024, he was host of the Bulgarian TV show Posledniyat Pecheli (Bulgarian: Последният печели, lit. 'The Last One Wins'), which airs on BNT 1. He was replaced by Bulgarian actor Kamen Vodenicharov.

== Career ==
=== Music career ===
Goranov started his career as a singer in the Bulgarian choir "Бодра смяна".

=== Movie career ===
Goranov appeared in the Bulgarian movie Mission London.

== Albums ==
- Към една жена (To a woman) (1983)
- Orlin Goranov (1985)
- Ти и аз (You and me) (2000), with Kristina Dimitrova

== Awards ==
- Youth Pop Song Competition, Sofia in 1978 – first place
- Schlager Festival in Dresden in 1981 – first place
- Intertalant in 1981, Prague – third place
- Golden Orpheus, Bulgaria 1984 – first place
