= BG Rock I =

Studio album by Kontrol and Nova Generacia
- Released: 1989
- Recorded: 1988
- Genre: Punk rock, New wave
- Length: 44:31
- Label: Balkanton
- Producer: Kontrol

Kontrol and Nova Generacia chronology
Stariyat dub (1988)	BG Rock I (1989)	BUMM (1991)

Nova Generacia chronology
BG Rock I (1989)	Forever (1991)

BG Rock I is a split album by the Bulgarian punk band Kontrol and new wave band Nova Generacia. It was released in 1989, and is the first release in the BG Rock series. The series was produced by Kiril Marichkov, a member of the famous Bulgarian rock band Shturcite. The album was a collaboration between the state label Balkanton and the Dimitrov Young Communist League. 5 LPs were released from 1989 to 1990.

== Track list ==
Songs 1–6 are by Kontrol. Songs 7-12 are by Nova Generacia.

1. Програма Programa (Program)
2. Обичам те, мила Obicham te, mila (I Love You, Darling)
3. 100–150
4. Без думи Bez dumi (Speechless)
5. Свобода Svoboda (Liberty)
6. Не умирахме от щастие Ne umirahme ot shtastie (We Didn't Die of Happiness)
7. Lovecut na surca (The Heart-Hunter)
8. Samo dvama (Only Two)
9. Strah (Fear)
10. Sueta (Vanity)
11. Narcis '88 (Narcissus 1988)
12. Ledove (Ice Blocks)
