= Spirit of Burgas =

Summer music festival in Bulgaria

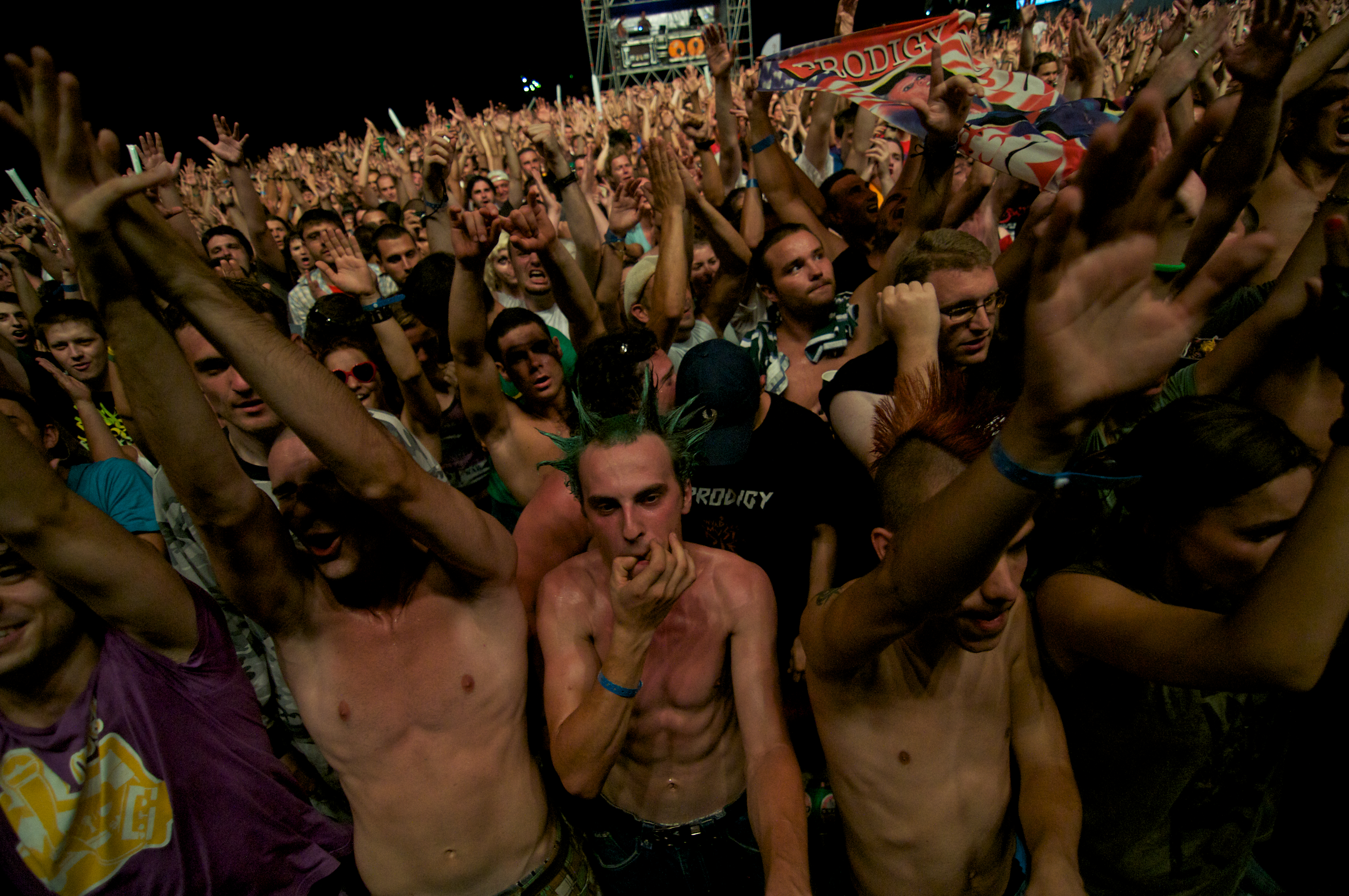
- Fans of The Prodigy at Spirit of Burgas 2010
- Genre: Rock, Electronica, Dance, Metal, Hip hop, Latin
- Dates: Two or three days in July or August
- Locations: Burgas, Bulgaria
- Years active: 2008 - 2013; 2015
- Website: www.spiritofburgas.com

Spirit of Burgas was a summer music festival in the city of Burgas, on the Black Sea coast of Bulgaria. The first edition of the festival took place on 15–17 August 2008 and since then has significantly grown in popularity, becoming one of the most prominent summer festivals in Europe. Among its partners and sponsors are MTV Europe, who aired two specials about the festival in September 2008, as well as Tuborg, Mobiltel, Jack Daniel's, Jacobs, and DSK Bank.

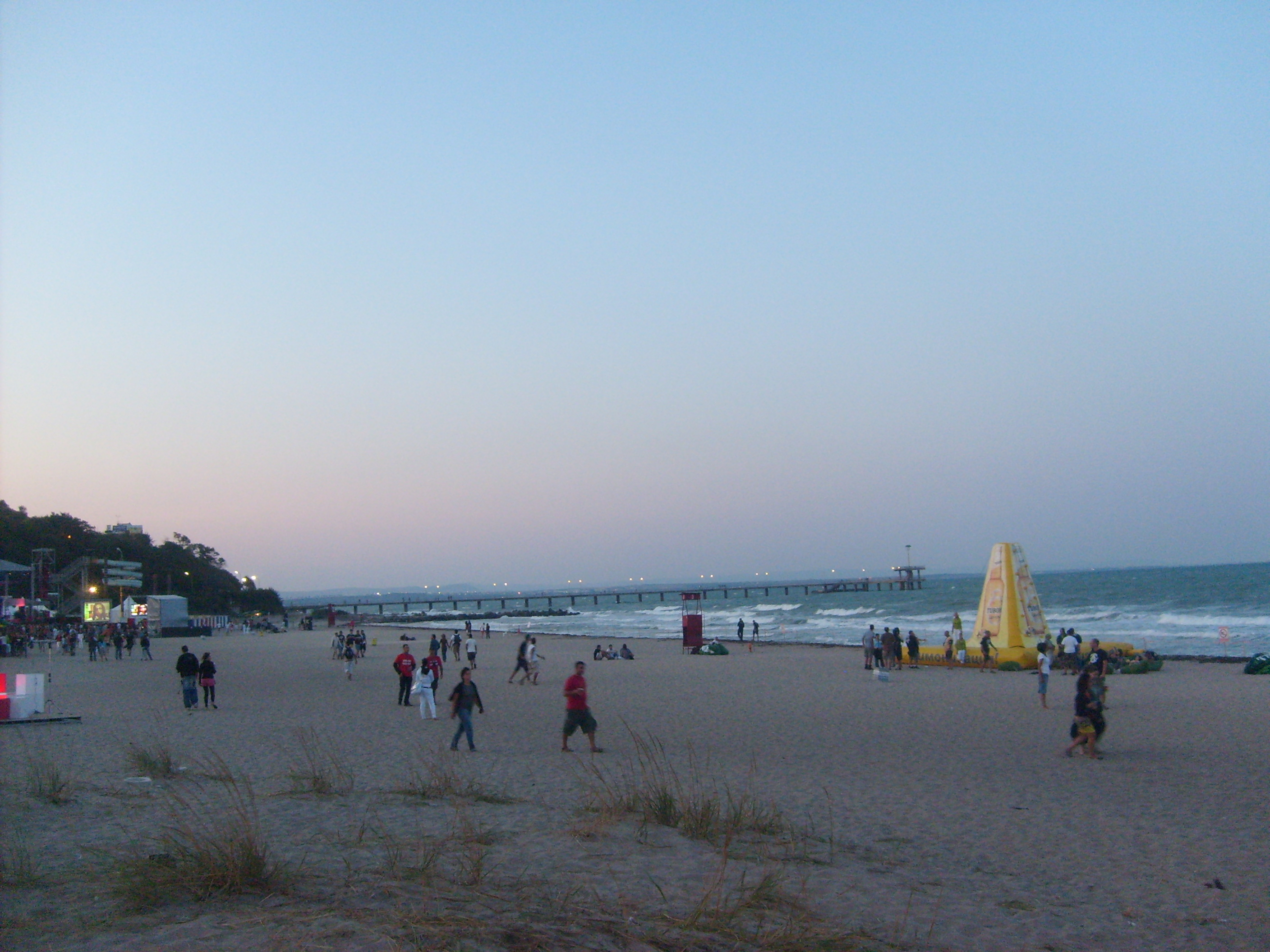
The festival site

== Festival site ==
The festival area is located at the southern part of the Burgas Sea Garden. It includes also Burgas' central beach area. The main stage and some of the other stages are placed directly on the sand.

== History ==
=== 2008 line-up ===
The premiere edition of the festival featured performers such as The Sisters of Mercy, Hot Club de Paris, Asian Dub Foundation, Pharoahe Monch, Upsurt, Cradle of Filth, Kosheen and Bonobo on the main stage. Besides the main stage, there were separate dance, rock, DJ, and Latino stages presenting well-known and aspiring artists alike. Among the more popular artists on the other stages were Chris Liebing, Andy Cato of Groove Armada, King Roc of Ministry of Sound, Pendulum, Wickeda and Deep Zone Project.

=== 2009 line-up ===
The second edition of Spirit of Burgas took place on 14–16 August 2009, and featured Faith No More, Fun Lovin' Criminals, The Crystal Method, Clawfinger, Dreadzone, LTJ Bukem, De Phazz, Sub Focus, Alexander Kowalski, Speedy J, Mario Ranieri, and the Australian alternative rock band The Monicans among others.

=== 2010 line-up ===
The 2010 edition took place on August 13–15. The headliners were The Prodigy and Serj Tankian, frontman of System of a Down. The Prodigy, Serj Tankian, Apollo 440, Andy C, Vendetta, Ostava, Everlast, DJ Shadow, Default, Wickeda, Gorillaz Sound System, and Sub Zero Farm among others.

=== 2011 line-up ===
The 2011 line-up was headlined by Moby, Skunk Anansie, and Leftfield, and took place August 12–14. Moby, Skunk Anansie, Onyx, Gotan Project, Jeff Scott Soto, Skindred, Deftones, and Leftfield among others.

=== 2012 line-up ===
The 2012 edition took place on August 3–5. The festival had 5 stages, covering rock, dance, world and Latin music genres.

==== Main Stage ====
BG Hip Hop Unity, Ms Dynamite, Tinie Tempah, Busta Rhymes, Caspa, Platform Crew, Panican Whyasker, Sensor, Sum 41, The Prodigy, Skiller, Foreign Beggars DJ Set, DJ NoNames, Wickeda (Уикеда), Gentleman and the Evolution, Chase and Status, Korn, Audio & Mc Stapleton, HMSU Crew.

==== Solar Dance Arena ====
Juan Alvarez, Sunnery James & Ryan Marciano, Armin Van Buuren, Mark Knight, Fedde Le Grand, Liubo Ursiny, Richie Hawtin, Dubfire

==== "Jack Daniel's" Rock Stage ====
Silhouette (Силует), Nomadia (Номадия), Les Elephants Bizzares, Ostava (Остава), Svetlio and the Legends, Milena, Cut Off, Redound, Vendetta, Last Hope, Контрол, Piranha, Downslot, Stop Stop, The Jim Jones Revue, ODD CREW, SAWTHIS

==== Na Tumno (На Тъмно)Stage ====
Preyah & Smooth, FRAPPE, Rock a Shock, Kozza Mostra, Django Ze (Джанго Зе), Upsurt, DJ 100 Kila, Top Stoppers, X Team, R&B Records vs. Sniper Records, Conquering Lion, MC NRG D + Band, Zion Lion's Soundsystem, Funkamental, Q Check feat. Сърмата Хари, DRS, Нокаут & Guests, Popa Sapka, DJ Bai Pop, Zion Lion's Reggae Experience

==== BrazzoBrazzie Stage ====
Bee in the Bonnet, Mad Dogs, RomaNeno Project, Johnny Vasquez & Tumbaito, Dj Dobcho, Sentimental Swingers & Mihail Yossifov, J.I.B.R.I., Da New Generation, Leah Kline Quintet, Frankie Morales & Tumbaito, Southwick & Рут Колева (Ruth Koleva), Funkallero, Смут и мизерия в Източна Румелия, Mango Duende, Brazz ViliDJ & Friends

=== 2013 line-up ===
The 2013 edition took place on July 27–28. The 2013 edition of the festival was moved back to 27–28 July. According to the organizers, this was done so that the festival could coincide with the European tours of major bands. Artists who performed included Wu-Tang Clan, Little Roy, Che Sudaka, Selah Sue, Enter Shikari, The Editors, Zaz, Chase & Status, Upsurt, Paul Oakenfold, Milenita, Sci Fi Records artists: Electronic Element, Doubleganger, Moodmakers, Stan Davichone, DeepImpulser and Above & Beyond. The Yalta club midnight programme on the main stage included Andy C and Dub FX.

=== 2014 line-up ===
The festival was canceled for 2014. In a given interview in April 2014 the festival director explains that the festival has been canceled due to insufficient funding.

=== 2015 line-up ===
In 2015 the festival had 2 stages and it was held two nights on 7 & 8 of August. The line up consisted of a total of 27 local Bulgarian and international live acts and DJ's. The first main stage headline act announced on 17 March 2015 was Robbie Williams. The second main stage headline act was Kasabian and it was announced 7 weeks to the festival on 19 June. In 2015 the festival was attended by some 47000 people. This is considered as the highest festival attendance Spirit of Burgas have ever had.

==== Main Stage ====
Friday, August 7 : Mastilo, Milow, Kwabs, Robbie Williams, Stereo MC's DJ Set, Jin Monic

Saturday, August 8 : Bobo & The Gang, Hayes & Y, Kasabian, DJ SS + High Roll, Calyx & Teebee, Danny Byrd, The Prototypes, Maztek, Full Kontakt, EXo

==== Na Tumno (На Тъмно) Stage ====
Friday, August 7 : Toy Letters, Мерудия, Kottarashky & The Rain Dogs, Ogi 23, BASSKA, DJ Balkan Mash

Saturday, August 8 : Funkaround, Rebelites, Severozapadnyatsite, P.I.F., РЕВЮ, Conquering Lion

=== 2016 ===
On 3 September 2015 was announced that Spirit of Burgas 2016 will be a 3-day event. On 31 January 2016 Burgas Municipality festival director announces in a radio interview that the festival organisation is put on hold due to lack of interest among the Bulgarian promoters and Spirit of Burgas are still looking for a festival promoter.
