= Rock'n'Roll Veterans =

Studio album by Georgi Minchev
- Released: 1989
- Genre: Rock
- Label: Balkanton
- Producer: Georgi Minchev

Georgi Minchev chronology
BG Rock (1987)	Rock'n'Roll Veterans (1989)	Alone at the Bar (1994)

Rock'n'Roll Veterans is the second album by the Bulgarian rock musician Georgi Minchev who is also the producer of the work. It was released in 1989 by the state-owned record company Balkanton.

The songs of the album are result from the Minchev's collaboration with the well known Bulgarian musicians Kiril Marichkov, Petar Gyuzelev and Valdi Totev from Shturtsite and Rumen Boyadzhiev from FSB as well as Minchev's friend A. Dechev. That's why, in the album notes, Minchev wrote that he would like Rock'n'Roll Veterans to be perceived not just as a solo album but as album written by six friends.

The album was originally released on Cassette and Vinyl LP. In 1997, it was re-released on CD format together with the Minchev's first LP BG Rock (1987).

== Track listing ==
All lyrics are written by Georgi Minchev.

Side A:

1. "Рокендрол ветерани" / "Rock'n'Roll Veterans" (Minchev/K. Marichkov) - 3:36
2. "Момчето и аз" / "The Boy and Me" (Minchev/A. Dechev) - 3:33
3. "Какви времена" / "What Times" (Minchev/K. Marichkov) - 3:58
4. "Полтъргайст" / "Poltergeist" (Minchev/V. Totev) - 3:17
5. "Семеен блус" / "Family Blues" (Minchev/P. Gyuzelev) - 4:48

Side B:

1. "Момчета с китари" / "Boys with Guitars" (Minchev/P. Gyuzelev) - 4:22
2. "Мъж в гардероб" / "Man in Wardrobe" (Minchev/K. Marichkov) - 3:14
3. "Луди глави" / "Daredevils" (Minchev/V. Totev) - 2:47
4. "Рокендрол в събота" / "Rock'n'Roll on Saturday" (Minchev/P. Gyuzelev) - 4:26
5. "Една любов умря" / "One Love has Died" (Minchev/R. Boyadzhiev) - 4:52

== Personnel ==
- Georgi Minchev - All Vocals
- Petar Gyuzelev - Guitars
- Kiril Marichkov - Bass Guitar
- Valdi Totev - Keyboards
- Rumen Boyadzhiev - Keyboards
- Georgi Markov - Drums
- Emanuil Manolov-Badema - Tenor Saxophone
- Dechko Delchev - Tenor Saxophone
- Valeri Gradinarski - Guitars
- Panayot Slavchev - Piano
