= Kontrol =

Bulgarian punk rock band

Контрол (Kontrol)
- Origin: Sofia, Bulgaria
- Genres: Punk rock, alternative rock, experimental rock
- Years active: 1988-2000, 2009, 2014-present
- Labels: Balkanton, Mega International Records, Unison RTM, Marlboro Music, Radius Records, PolySound Inc.
- Members: Vladimir Popchev; Ivan Gatev; Ognyan Kyosovski; Toni Tenev
- Past members: Nikolai Yordanov; Krasimir Nedelin; Petar Stanoev; Bozhidar Trenkov; Antony Georgiev; Orlin Radinski
- Website: http://www.kontrolband.com/

Kontrol (in Bulgarian: Контрол) are a Bulgarian punk band. Initially active between 1988 and 2000, they achieved stardom in the early 1990s with their first two albums, Bumm (1991) and Lele kako (1993). In 1997, their lead singer Nikolai Yordanov left and the band's popularity declined, which led to their dissolution in 2000. They reformed in their original lineup in 2009 for a short Bulgarian tour, then reformed in 2014 with a new lead singer, Ivan Gatev.

== History ==
The band was formed in 1988 and were one of the first official punk bands in the country. Their first recordings, "Tryabva vsichko da priemam" and "Nai-vazhnoto", were for the 1988 film "Pred praga" (At the Doorstep). Later that year, they released a demo tape called Stariyat dub. The tape contained 8 songs.

In 1989, they were signed to Balkanton and released a split LP with Nova Generacia. The Kontrol side consisted of the first six songs from Stariyat dub. They then performed at the Svyat - chudni hora festival in Michurin. The first song they played, "Ima" (originally released on Stariyat dub) appeared on the official compilation in 1990.

In 1990, they recorded 15 songs at the BNR Studio II. After the fall of communism, 14 of the tracks were released on the BUMM cassette in 1991.

In 1992, they recorded their second album, Lele kako, released in 1993. They also released the 88-92 compilation. The A-side consisted of the Pred praga tracks, an unreleased track called "Bulgaria" and the six songs from the BG Rock I split. The B-side consisted of songs from BUMM and Lele kako. That year, BUMM was also reissued on cassette by Lazarov Records with the Pred praga songs and an unreleased version of Ne umirahme ot shtastie.

The band released their third album, LyubOFF, in 1994. In 1996, they released a concert album called Punku nema'a umre (Punk's not gonna die).

In 1998, founder Nikolai Yordanov left the band and was replaced by Petar Stanoev. With Stanoev, they released their fourth and final album, Pazete si decata (Save Your Children) in 1999. The band broke up a year later.

In 2004, the compilation Te t'va e was released, containing 22 songs from the Nikolai Yordanov period. In 2001, they recorded a song called "Urok po tanci".

In 2009, they embarked on a short tour of Bulgaria with Revyu and Hipodil.

In 2014, the band reformed with new singer Ivan Gatev. Their new album 9 was released in April 2017.

== Discography ==
- Stariyat dub (1988, self-released)
- BG Rock I (1989, Balkanton)
- BUMM (1991, Mega International Records)
- The Punk Years 1988-1991 (1992, Killed by the Perestroika, bootleg containing Stariat dub and the Kontrol side of BG Rock I plus some live tracks)
- Lele kako (1993, Unison)
- 88–92 (1993, Unison)
- Lyuboff (1994, Marlboro)
- Punku nema'a umre! (1996, Radius)
- Pazete si decata (Пазете си децата / Save Your Children) (1999, Polysound)
- Te t'va e! (2004, Stars Records)
- 9 (2017)
- Chervenata Kniga (Червената книга / The Red Book) (2021)
