= Kletva =

Song by Kiril Marichkov

from the album Zodija Shturec
- Released: 1988 (film version); 1997 (album version)
- Recorded: 1987 (film version); 1996 (album version)
- Genre: Rock
- Length: 1:50 (film version); 3:00 (album version)
- Label: Balkanton
- Songwriter: Kiril Marichkov
- Producer: Kiril Marichkov

"Kletva" (Bulgarian: Клетва [ˈklɛtvɐ], "oath") is a song by the Bulgarian musician Kiril Marichkov. The song is one of his best known.

== Recorded versions ==
The first version of the song appeared in the 1988 movie Vchera. It appears in the scene where the students take a blood oath and in the end credits, where Ivan leads the boy to a destiny unknown. That version ran approximately 1:50.

The next version to appear was the Zodia Shturec version, which was recorded in 1996 and appeared on the Shturcite compilations 1968-1980 and Best Ballads in that year. In 1997, it was released on Zodia Shturec, Kiril Marichkov's debut solo album. This version runs 3:00 and features an extra solo from Petur Gyuzelev that did not appear in the original. In 2004, it was released on disc 4 of the 4 CD compilation Antologia.

A third version was released in 2008, but this time it was not by Shturcite, but by British indie pop band Ladytron. It appears on their album Velocifero and introduced many to Bulgarian rock for the first time. It was sung in Bulgarian by Mira Aroyo (who, like Marichkov, is of Bulgarian-Jewish descent).

== Music video ==
A music video was filmed for the 1996 version, featuring Marichkov playing the song mixed with live and archival footage of Shturcite.
