= Ogledalo =

Ogledalo may refer to:

- Ogledalo (Peychinovich book), a religious collection written by Kiril Peychinovich in modern Bulgarian
- Ogledalo (group), a Serbian chamber music theater group formed by Boris Kovač
- "Ogledalo," a song by Bulgarian rock band Ostava
