= Nadurveni vuglishta =

Studio album by Hipodil
- Released: 25 November 1998
- Recorded: 1998
- Studio: Graffiti Studio, Sofia
- Genre: Rock
- Length: 47:20
- Label: Riva Sound

Hipodil chronology
S gol v rukata... (1996)	Nadurveni vuglishta (1998)	Tu'pest (1999)

"Nadurveni vuglishta" (Bulgarian: Надървени въглища [naˈdɤrvɛni vɐˈɡliʃtɐ]) is the fourth album by the Bulgarian rock band Hipodil, released on 25 November 1998 under the Riva Sound label, the band's fourth with the company. The name is a pun – in Bulgarian Nadurveni vuglishta means "Horny charcoal", but if written separately, as in Na durveni vuglishta, it will still sound like the first version, but the meaning will be quite different – "Roasted on charcoal".

According to Bulgarian newspaper Kultura, Bulgarian Ministry of Culture prohibited the CD release of the album, and a lawsuit was filed against the group for distributing materials with pornographic content. Despite this, the song from the same album "Bate Gojko" became a hit and catapulted Hipodil from the "modest role of being widely known in narrow circles to nationwide popularity". The album was re-released on CD in 2003.

Some of the tracks were included in the band's CD compilation Tu'pest in 1999.

== Tracks ==
Side 1: Дупетък
No.	Title	Length
1.	"B.G. (Бате Гойко)" (Big Brother Gojko)	4:21
2.	"Въжен" (Rope-made)	3:32
3.	"Потъване нагоре" (Sinking Upward)	3:55
4.	"Позледното земно изпразване на космонавта Романенко" (Cosmonaut Romanenko's Last Jerk-off on Earth)	2:51
5.	"Нищо" (Nothing)	3:03
6.	"Без хигиена (Мезе на гъза)" (Without Hygiene (Relish on the Ass))	3:05
7.	"Щранк"	2:04
Total length:		22:48

Side 2: Минети на гъза
No.	Title	Length
8.	"Тинтири-минтири" (similar to the English phrase "Blah-blah")	3:38
9.	"Отнесен" (Scatterbrained)	4:40
10.	"Ариведерчи (от ивицата Газа в Устанкино)" (Bye)	3:34
11.	"Bless Me" (Bilingual visual pun on Bulgarian Влез ми/Vlez mi, meaning "Enter me", used to pick fights)	3:00
12.	"Възбуден съм" (I'm Horny)	4:15
13.	"Въртианален SEX" (Virtuanal SEX)	2:40
14.	"Д'ска" (pun between ska and bulgarian Дъска/Dyska, meaning board)	2:40
Total length:		24:27

== Personnel ==
- Svetoslav Vitkov – vocals
- Petar Todorov – guitars
- Ventzi Bassistcheto – bass guitar
- Lachezar Marinov – drums
