= Sea Garden =

Sea Garden may refer to:

- Sea Garden (Burgas), Bulgaria
- Sea Garden (Varna), Bulgaria
