= Alen Mak =

Socialist cultural event held annually in Bulgaria from 1975 to 1989

The Festival of the political song "Alen Mak" (Scarlet Poppy) was an annual event from 1975 to 1989 which was held in the city of Blagoevgrad, Bulgaria. It was organized by the official cultural institutions in socialist Bulgaria and the Komsomol, intended to develop and popularize among young people the genre of the political songs with antiwar, commemorative anti-fascist, guerrilla, anti-capitalist content. Along with the participation of popular Bulgarian estrada singers with a specific repertoire, the festival was attended by many musical groups and solo musicians with leftist orientation from the entire world.

The event was named after the popular Bulgarian song "Alen Mak" from the interwar period, reckoned as a musical symbol of Bulgarian communist's fight with the previous regime. During the socialist times it was defined as "the favorite song" of the founder of the Bulgarian social-democratic party (from which derives the communist party as well) Dimitar Blagoev.

The state-owned monopolist record company Balkanton issued compilations of chosen songs from the festivals on LPs and 7" records.
