= Shturcite =

Bulgarian rock band

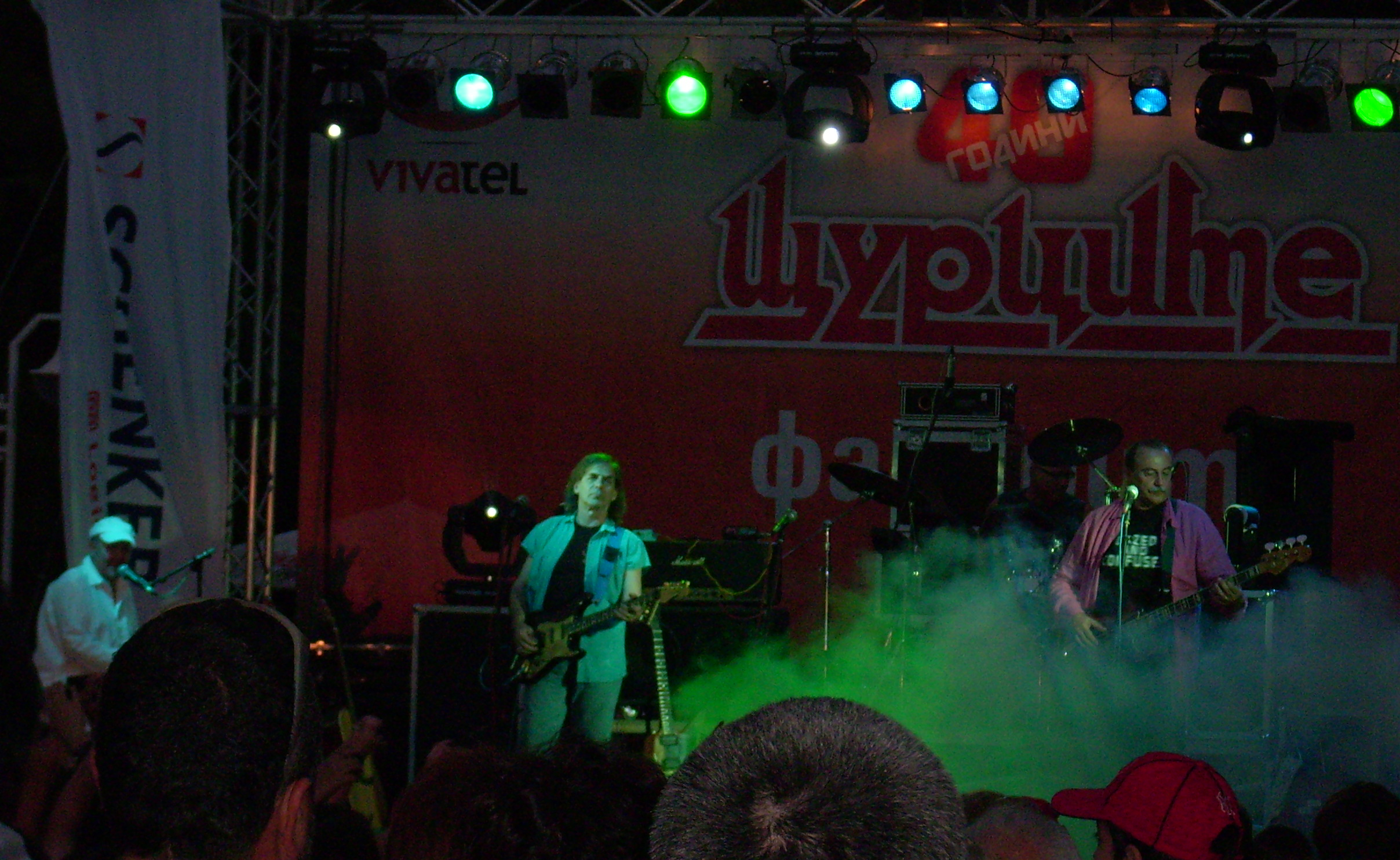
- Shturtsite in 2007

Background information
- Origin: Sofia, Bulgaria
- Genres: Pop rock, beat (early); Hard rock, progressive rock (later)
- Years active: 1967–1990; 1997–2013; 2017
- Labels: Balkanton, GMP, Varna Sound, Vitality Music
- Past members: Kiril Marichkov; Vladimir Totev; Georgi Markov; Petar Gyuzelev; Atanas Atanasov; Borislav Panov; Veselin Kisiov; Petar Tsankov; Konstantin Atanasov; Georgi Minchev

Shturcite (Bulgarian: Щурците [ʃtorˈt͡sitɛ]; English "The Crickets"), sometimes romanized as Shturtsite, was a Bulgarian rock group. They were one of the most successful bands in Bulgaria during the 1970s and 1980s and still have many fans. The band broke up once in 1990, reformed in 1997, and disbanded again in 2013. The group has been characterized as "Bulgaria's answer to The Beatles".

== History ==
The group was created in 1967 in Sofia by Kiril Marichkov, Petar Tsankov (both from Bandaratsite group), Petar Gyuzelev, and Veselin Kisyov (both from Slănchevi Bratya group). Their first performance was at a students party in VITIZ (The Bulgarian School for Performing Arts), and in 1967 they made their first records. At first Georgi Minchev took part in the group, too, and with him they made their first success: the song "Byala Tishina" ("Бяла тишина"; "White Silence") of the composer Boris Karadimchev, winning the national award of Zlatnia Orfey ("Златния Орфей", the Golden Orpheus).

In 1968, the group issued their first EP containing the songs "Veselina" ("Веселина", lyrics: Radoy Ralin), "Zvăn" ("Звън"; Ringing), "Malkiat Svetăl Prozorets" ("Малкият светъл прозорец"; Little Bright Window) and "Izprashtane" ("Изпращане", Dispatch).

It was not until 1976 that they recorded their first homonymous LP with its hit single "Day Mi Malko Nezhnost" ("Дай ми малко нежност"; "Give Me A Little Tenderness"). Their second album Shturtsite '78 two years later introduced band's new keyboard player and singer, Valdi Totev. His influence took away the band far from its early pop sound to a new prog rock territory. The first song on the LP "Nyakoi Ot Vas" ("Някои от вас"; "Some Of You") is their first leading album song not to be sung by lead vocalist Marichkov, but by the newcomer, Totev. Despite his influence on the band's sound, Totev did not write a single song for the album.

In 1980, Shturtsite issued XX vek (20th Century), featuring the hits "Dve sledi", the title track and "Svatben den". Two years later, the double LP Vkusăt na vremeto (The Taste of Time) was issued, featuring many hits, such as the title track. The band spent the rest of the 1980s recording two new albums, Konnikăt and Musketarski marsh, released in 1985 and 1987. They then played a national tour to celebrate their 20th anniversary throughout 1987. Tracks from the concerts were edited together into a triple album called 20 godini po-kusno, released in 1988.

In 1990, the band released their final single, "Az săm prosto chovek", which became a popular anthem for Bulgarian democracy in the 1990s. They then broke up. Later that year, Balkanton released a compilation called The Crickets, which mainly consists of tracks from Musketarski marsh and also included a live version of the song "XX vek" (the recording is taken from 20 godini po-kăsno). This was Shturtsite's first official CD release and is one of only two issues of the 20 godini po-kusno songs on CD (the other being "Pesen za Shturtsite" on 1968–1980). All the text on The Crickets is in English (except for the copyright warning on the CD, which is written in English, French, German and Bulgarian) and features liner notes by a woman called Claire Levi. It and a similar compilation by fellow Bulgarian rock band FSB are the first two rock releases on CD in the Balkanton catalogue.

Six years later, the independent label GMP reissued most of their back catalogue (except for their two self-titled albums) on CD (albeit issuing a cut-down 13 track version of Vkusăt na vremeto) and also released two 2-disc compilation albums by them, 1968–1980 and Best Ballads. A new song, "Kletva", was included on both compilations. The song is a re-recording of a track written for and previously featured in the film Vchera (1988) in 1987 and later appeared on the Kiril Marichkov solo album Zodia Shturets, from whose sessions the recording is taken. As well as "Kletva", the song "Za spomen ot Shturtsite", recorded in 1983, was included. It is a medley of the following songs:

- "Dve sledi" (Two Traces)
- "Veselina"
- "Zvăn" (Ring)
- "Pesen bez dumi" (A Song Without Words)
- "Svatben den" (Wedding Day)
- "Dai mi malko nezhnost" (Gimme a Little Tenderness)
- "Zorata" (The Dawn)
- "Star album" (Old Album)
- "Pesen za Shturtsite" (Song for Shturtsite/Song for the Crickets)
- "Vkusăt na vremeto" (The Taste of Time)

Another Shturtsite medley was performed at the concerts that became 20 godini po-kusno in 1987, called "Kitka 'Shturtsite'".

In 1997, Shturtsite reformed and played a national tour. 10 tracks from one of the concerts were released on the CD 30 godini Shturtsite in 1998, alongside six new songs.

The band released a 4-CD retrospective of their work, Antologia, in 2004. The release contained selected tracks from their discography and a few compilation and unreleased tracks. Their first 3 singles, "Zvăn", "Pesen za Shturtsite" and "Ti ne razbra", as well as Konnikăt and Musketarski marsh, were included in full on the discs. A concert DVD was also issued two years later, recorded at the NDK on 15 November 2004, featuring guest appearances from Safo, D-2, Doni (from Doni i Momchil) and Ahat, who also did a cover of "Na praga".

In 2007, Shturtsite recorded new material, which was released as their 9th and final album Na praga na sărtseto in 2008. Na praga na sărtseto was their first release of all-new material since 1987's Musketarski marsh.

The band still played concerts, but no new material was issued after Na praga na sărtseto. Marichkov had stated in interviews that guitarist Petar Gyuzelev's brain tumour was holding the band back. He had stated that if Gyuzelev dies, Shturtsite would break up. In 2011, he had stated that Shturtsite would hold a big concert with a symphony orchestra to end the band and celebrate 45 years of existence, plus record an acoustic CD containing their hits. Neither the concert or the album happened.

Gyuzelev died on 25 April 2013, ending the band. Three months before his death, he issued Izpoved, his first and only solo album. In an interview with 24 chasa, he stated he had plans to release three more albums "before the end of the year". With Gyuzelev's death, it is not known whether these albums will be released. Marichkov has since started a new band, Fondatsiata (The Foundation).

On 3 June 2017, Shturtsite reformed, with Marichkov's Fondatsiata bandmates Ivan Lechev (from FSB) and Slavcho Nikolov (from B.T.R.) replacing Gyuzelev on guitar, for a 50th anniversary concert at the Armeec Arena in Sofia.

Marichkov died on 11 October 2024 after suffering a fall.

== Members ==
- Kiril Marichkov – bass, vocals, keyboards (1967–1990, 1997–2013, 2017, d. 2024)
- Petar "Petsi" Gyuzelev – guitars, vocals, (1967–1990, 1997–2013, d. 2013)
- Vladimir "Valdi" Totev – keyboards, guitars, harmonica, vocals (1976–1990, 1997–2013, 2017)
- Georgi Markov – drums, percussion (1974–1990, 1997–2013, 2017, d. 2025)
- Veselin Kisyov – guitar, vocals (1967–1969, 2017)
- Petar Tsankov – drums (1967–1971, 2017)
- Konstantin Atanasov (Kosyo Shturetsa) – guitar, vocals (1969–1971, 1973–1974, 1976, 2017)
- Atanas Atanasov – drums (1973–1974)
- Borislav Panov – keyboards, vocals, violin (1974–1976)
- Ivan Lechev – guitar, violin (2017, stand-in for Gyuzelev)
- Slavcho Nikolov – guitar (2017, stand-in for Gyuzelev)

== Discography ==
=== Albums ===
- Shturtsite (1976)
- Shturtsite (1978)
- 20-ti vek (1980)
- Vkusăt na vremeto (1982)
- Konnikăt (1985)
- Musketarski marsh (1987)
- 20 godini po-kăsno (1988)
- 30 godini Shturtsite (1998)
- Na praga na sărtseto (2008)

=== Singles ===
All singles were officially self-titled except for "Păteshestvie săs sal" and "Az săm prosto chovek". The titles used here are taken from the official A-side of the original 45's. "Păteshestvie săs sal" was part of a soundtrack for the movie of the same name.

- "Zvăn" (1968)
- "Pesen za Shturtsite" (1969)
- "Shte sreshtnem nashata mechta" (1973)
- "Păteshestvie sus sal" (1973)
- "Ti ne razbra" (1975)
- "Uchilishte za malki i golemi" (1975)
- "Az săm prosto chovek" (1990)

=== Compilations ===
- The Crickets (1990)
- 1968–1980 I (1996)
- 1968–1980 II (1996)
- Best Ballads I (1996)
- Best Ballads II (1996)
- Antologia (2004)

== DVDs ==
- Antologia – Kontsertat 15.11.2004 (2006)
