= Wickeda =

Bulgarian rock band

- Origin: Bozhurishte, Bulgaria
- Genres: Punk; Ska; Reggae; Funk; Bulgarian folk
- Years active: 1997-2018, 2022-present
- Members: Erol Ibrahimov; Rosen Grygorov; Deian Dragiev; Alexander Borisov; Sando Sandov

Wickeda (Bulgarian: Уикеда [wikɛˈda]) are a Bulgarian rock band. They are quite popular in Bulgaria, and have occasionally topped the charts. Their style comprises punk, ska, reggae, funk and some traditional Bulgarian folk music elements. The witty lyrics filled with wordplay dealing mainly with stories from everyday life and the danceable tunes with memorable hooks have largely contributed to the band's success.

== History ==
Wickeda are one of the most well-known bands in Bulgaria. When their first album Революция ("Revolution") appeared in 1999, it caught immediately the attention of musicians, journalists and music fans alike. The album was something of a turning point for the ailing Bulgarian popular music scene. It signalled the emergence of a new wave of Bulgarian rock and electronic bands on and around the label Жълта музика ("Yellow Music"). Bulgaria's leading music magazine at the time, New Rhythm chose it as one of the 35 best Bulgarian albums ever, and Wickeda won the prize for Best band and Best newcomer awarded by the music TV channel MM. The single " А ние с Боби двамата пием кафе" ("And I and Bobby, We are Both Drinking Coffee") stayed in MM's Top Ten for 10 weeks and the album sold over 30,000 copies.

In 2000 Wickeda released their second album Затова, защото... ("That's Why, Because..."). The first single, Уиски с фъстъци ("Whiskey and Peanuts") again reached high positions in the Top Ten. At the yearly MM-awards they won prizes for Best band and Best album. The second album sold over 20,000 copies.

The third album До тук ("Until Here"), a retrospective of Wickeda's work, came out in 2001, including four new songs. During their European tour (Czech Republic, Slovakia, Germany, Hungary), they released a single out of their fourth album Осъзнай се класово (approx. "Realise your Class Membership") in advance. After the tour the album was completed and managed once again to make it into the Top Ten.

In the summer of 2004 came the fifth and final album called 1618. There were some new Balkan influences, while the style of the band was still varied and got even harder. A lot of the tracks on the album were English translations of older songs, albeit three new songs, "Секси" (Sexy), "Ми да" (I'm Here!) and "The Letter", were added. The Bulgarian version of "The Letter" has never been released, although the CD-Text of 1618 refers to it as "Pismo nov voc". In the autumn Wickeda made another European tour presenting their new album in Hungary, the Czech Republic, Germany, the Netherlands, and Bulgaria.

In October 2009 UK dubstep producer Ramadanman, in conjunction with the British Council and Hessle Audio, released a 500 limited edition white label remix 12" single of the Wickeda track "А Ние Двамата с Боби Пием Кафе" from their 1999 debut album 'Revolution'. The Hessle Audio co-owner and producer was approached by the council to remix a track picked by the Bulgarian public, drawn from a selection of their top 10 90's Bulgarian pop songs.

In 2010 they were headliners at Spirit of Burgas after Everlast couldn't make it because of sickness.

On 10 June 2018, bandleader Erol Ibrahimov announced the end of the band on his personal Facebook page, stating that the band "had no more to say" after 21 years.

In 2022, Wickeda reunited, and have since continued to perform live. A new album is also in the works.

== Members ==
- Erol Ibrahimov (vocals, bass)
- Rosen Grygorov (guitar)
- Vladimir Georgiev - Popa(drums)
- Yassen Obretenov - Yashata (keyboard)

== Discography ==
- Revolyutsia (Революция) (1999)
- Zatova, zashtoto... (Затова, защото...) (2000)
- Do tuk (До тук) (2001)
- Osaznay se klasovo (Осъзнай се класово) (2003)
- 1618 (2004)

== Tours and festivals ==
They have played numerous festivals and made several tours abroad, even overseas:

- USA Tour, 2001
- The Sziget Festival in Budapest, Hungary in 2000, 2001, 2002, 2004, 2005, 2007
- The Taksirat Festival in North Macedonia (2002)
- Croatia (Ska-/Reggae-/Dub-Festival 2002)
- Slovakia (2002)
- Greece (Agrinio Festival, 2002)
- Germany (Fusion Festival, Rockxplosion, Stadt Festival 2003, Waltroper Parkfest 2004)
- Club tour across Germany in Cologne, Berlin, Munich, Hamburg and Münster in 2002
- The Netherlands (Wantijpop Festival 2005, Elastiek Festival 2005)

They have also had their own successful gigs in Prague and Budapest.
