= Hipodil =

Bulgarian rock band

- Origin: Sofia, Bulgaria
- Genres: Punk rock; Ska punk; Crossover thrash
- Years active: 1988–2004, 2006, 2011, 2013, 2018
- Labels: Unison RTM; Riva Sound; PolySound Inc.
- Past members: Petar Todorov; Svetoslav Vitkov; Lachezar Marinov; Ventsislav Lozanov; Nikola Kavaldjiev; Miroslav Tellalov; Nikolai Savov
- Website: www.hypodil.com

Hipodil (Bulgarian: Хиподил [xipoˈdiɫ]) was a Bulgarian rock band, founded in the late 1980s in Sofia by four classmates from the local Mathematics High School.

Hipodil's popularity was based in large on their aggressive, sarcastic, sometimes vulgar and explicit but yet humorous lyrics. Because of that Hipodil were known as a "scandalous and rebellious" band. Their main goal was to entertain the listener and themselves; most of the lyrics concerned topics such as alcohol, sex, women, the status quo, etc.; they frequently ridiculed famous Bulgarian and non-Bulgarian people and even politicians (and sometimes songs). Nevertheless, the band had some pretty serious tracks with complex and socially oriented lyrics. All the lyrics were in Bulgarian and were written by vocalist Svetoslav Vitkov (Svetlyo). Most of the music was composed by guitarist Petar Todorov (Pesho). In a great number of songs, guest musicians took part, adding mainly to the brass section.

== History ==
Four classmates from Sofia's Mathematics High School--Nikola Kavaldjiev, Miroslav Tellalov, Nikolay Savov, and Petar Todorov--formed in 1988 a punk band which played only their own songs in Bulgarian and named it by combining the words "Hippo" and "Crocodile."

The first public performance of the band was at Sofia's Summer Theatre, an open-air stage in the largest city park, where the band performed the song "Zidaromazachi" (Wallplasterers), a parody of the ruling communist regime, which got them into minor trouble with the authorities.

In 1992, after a couple of line-up changes and recruiting the new vocalist Svetoslav Vitkov, Hipodil recorded the songs "Bira s vodka" ("Beer With Vodka"), "Bira" ("Beer"), "Chift ochi" ("A Pair of Eyes", "Himna" ("The Anthem"), "Jenata" ("The Woman") and "Klitoren orgasm" ("Clitoral Orgasm").

The following year, the band released their first studio album called Alkoholen delirium (Alcoholic Delirium). The band immediately launched a self-bankrolled national tour, which turned quite successful. At one of the tour concerts in Varna, a mass alcohol-fuelled disorder erupted and all band members and some of the audience were arrested. This event, along with the explicit lyrics of most of their songs gave Hipodil their "scandal aura".

The Varna incident inspired a song - "Hipodili" - which Hipodil included in their next album, Nekuf ujas, nekuf at (Some Kind of Horror, Some Kind of Hell), recorded and released in 1994. This song became a Hipodil anthem and a concert favorite. The album release was followed by a national tour with some 20 dates across the country.

In their fourth album Nadurveni vuglishta (Horny Charcoal), released in 1998, the band showed obvious growth in terms of music and production and experimented with other styles, mostly ska. This album was the most commercially successful album of the band and the first to be released on a CD. It was also the most controversial as some of the lyrics provoked Bulgarian Ministry of Culture to mull legal actions against the band for obscenity. The ministry later dropped its plans but the dispute fuelled the album sales and Hipodil suddenly found themselves among the best-selling and most radio played acts in Bulgaria.

The album's opening track, song about Gojko Mitić, "Bate Gojko" ("Big Brother Gojko") rocketed to the top of Bulgarian airplay charts and was among the few Hipodil songs to have a video clip. The first ever instrumental track of Hipodil is also on this record, "Otnesen!" ("Scatter-Brained") and a dose of the traditional mockeries with Bulgarian celebrities.

In the end of 1999, the vocalist Svetoslav Vitkov went to work in the United States. Despite the loss of Vitkov, the other band members decided to start recording new material, inviting several singers from other Bulgarian bands, who replaced Vitkov on the vocals. The new album, called Hora ot naroda (People of the Folk), appeared on the Bulgarian music market in the year 2000. The music style is similar to the previous works of Hipodil, but a little bit more soft-sounding and mainly ska-influenced. Not so typical for the band is also the often usage of keyboards. Vitkov appears as a lead singer in only two of the songs - "Partizani" ("Partisans") and "Drugo nyama" ("There's Nothing Else"), and as a backing vocal in "Choveche" ("Dude").

In 2002, a promo single for the song "Skakauec" ("Grasshopper") was released. It had two tracks, the title track, which is about a dialectal phenomenon relating to the pronunciation of the letter Л, and a B-side, PVC, which is about women with small breasts. Hipodil was set to release an album, "Aa, Bb, Vv, Gg, Zz...", including the two tracks, but it was never released due to the band's break-up in 2004.

Hipodil will never be remembered for a musical and/or lyrical and/or production brilliance and yet the band constitutes integral part of the post-Communist era popular culture in Bulgaria. Both critics and fans agree that the band's songs and behaviour truly reflect the changes in Bulgarian society in the 1990s and present them in way that young people of all classes and background easily understand.

In 2006, Hipodil played at the "Koncert na godinata" at the Zimen dvorec in Sofia alongside Review and Upsurt. A new song, "Let Me Da Te Love You", was debuted at the event. Svetlio & the Legends, considered by many to be the successor band to Hipodil, released it on their 2007 album Bulgarno. In 2009, Riva Sound released Tu'pest 2, a sequel to the original Tu'pest. In 2011, Hipodil played alongside Kontrol and Review at the Zimen dvorec for the film Sega i zavinagi. Svetlio and the Legends released their second album IBAN in that year.

In 2013, Hipodil played a concert at Zimen dvorec to celebrate 20 years since the release of Alkoholen delirium. 2018 saw the group reunite once again at Arena Armeec to celebrate 20 years of Nadurveni vuglishta, also reissuing several old shirts from the 1990s to celebrate.

== Discography ==
=== Studio albums ===
- Alkoholen delirium/Alcoholic Delirium (1993)
- Nekuf ujas, nekuf at/Kinda Horror, Kinda Hell (1994)
- S gol v rukata.../With a Naked ... in Hand (1996)
- Nadurveni vuglishta/Aroused Charcoal (1998) (a pun for Na durveni vuglishta - 'On Charcoal')
- Hora ot naroda/People of the Folk (2000)

=== Other ===
- Tu'pest/The Best (1999) (compilation) (a pun from tup - Bulgarian for 'dumb' and -est, the superlative suffix in English.)
- "Hipodil" EP (also known as Скакауец/Skakauec, Grasshopper) (2002)
- Tu'pest 2 (compilation) (2009)
