= Stariyat dub =

Demo album by Kontrol
- Released: 1988
- Recorded: 1988
- Genre: Punk rock
- Length: 28:48
- Label: Private release
- Producer: Kontrol

Kontrol chronology
Stariyat dub (1988)	BG Rock I (1989)

Stariyat dub (Bulgarian: Старият дъб, The Old Tree) is the first release by the Bulgarian punk band Kontrol. It was released in 1988.

In 1989, the first 6 songs were released on BG Rock I. The whole tape later appeared on The Punk Years 1988-1991.

== Track list ==
1. Програма (Programa/Program)
2. Обичам те, мила (Obicham te, mila/I Love You, Darling)
3. 100–150
4. Без думи (Bez dumi/Speechless)
5. Свобода (Svoboda/Liberty)
6. Не умирахме от щастие (Ne umirahme ot shtastie/We Didn't Die of Happiness)
7. Има (Ima/There Is)
8. Домакиня (Domakinya/Housewife)
