= Svetlio & the Legends =

Bulgarian alternative rock band

Svetlio & The Legends
- Origin: Sofia, Bulgaria
- Genres: Alternative rock, ska
- Years active: 2007-present
- Label: SKD Sound
- Spinoff of: Hipodil
- Members: Svetoslav Vitkov; Vladimir Mitin; Aleksandar Borisov; Borislav Rashkov; Petar Aleksandrov; Ivan Mechkarov; Nikolai Dobrev - Money
- Past members: Chavdar Vulchev; Vencislav Micov
- Website: http://www.svetlio.bg

Svetlio & the Legends, also referred to as Svetlio Hipodilski i Legendite (Bulgarian: Светльо Хиподилски и Легендите [svɛtˈʎɔ xipoˈdiɫski i lɛˈɡɛnditɛ]), is a Bulgarian alternative rock band, formed in 2007 by former members of Hipodil.

== History ==
Hipodil broke up in 2004, but still played gigs. In 2006, at a concert at Zimen dvorec in Sofia, Hipodil played alongside Revyu and Upsurt. They debuted a new song entitled "Let Me Da Te Love You", which used a mixed form of Bulgarian and English words.

In 2007, Svetlio and the Legends released their debut album, Bulgarno in 2007. The album stated it contained 10 tracks, however only nine were released, because track 5, "Povarhnostni rani" (Повърхностни рани, Running Wounds) was said to have been plagiarised from an Italian pop song. The track "Let Me Da Te Love You" was on it, and it became a big hit. A music video was filmed for it.

In 2008, the video for "Povarhnostni rani" was released, however the beginning and end of the song were faded out.

In 2011, the band released their second album IBAN. It contained the hit "Boli me gaza" (Боли ме гъза, My Ass Hurts), the full version of "Povarhnostni rani" (by then renamed "Fani"), two versions of the track "CMR/ЧМР" (Chalga Metal Rock/Чалга Метъл Рок) and a track called "Rambo Silek" (Рамбо Силек), which according to Svetlio was intended for Hipodil's ill-fated sixth album Aa, Bb, Vv, Gg, Zz.... That year, Svetoslav Vitkov and Vencislav Micov were nominated for president and vice president in the 2011 Bulgarian elections.

In 2012, they released a music video for a song called "Mitko" (Митко) (also known as "Dimitrich/Димитрич").

On 27 March 2015, they played their first gig in the English-speaking world at the 100 Club in London.

== Members ==
- Svetoslav Vitkov - vocals
- Vladimir Mitin - trumpet
- Aleksandar Borisov - trombone
- Borislav Rashkov - bass
- Petar Aleksandrov - drums, percussion
- Ivan Mechkarov - accordion (since 2010)
- Nikolai Dobrev - Mani - guitar (since 2010)

=== Former members ===
- Chadar Vulchev - guitar (until 2010)
- Vencislav Micov - keyboards, programming, arrangements (until 2010)

== Discography ==
- Bulgarno (2007)
- IBAN (2011)
