= Georgi Minchev (musician) =

Georgi Minchev Георги Минчев
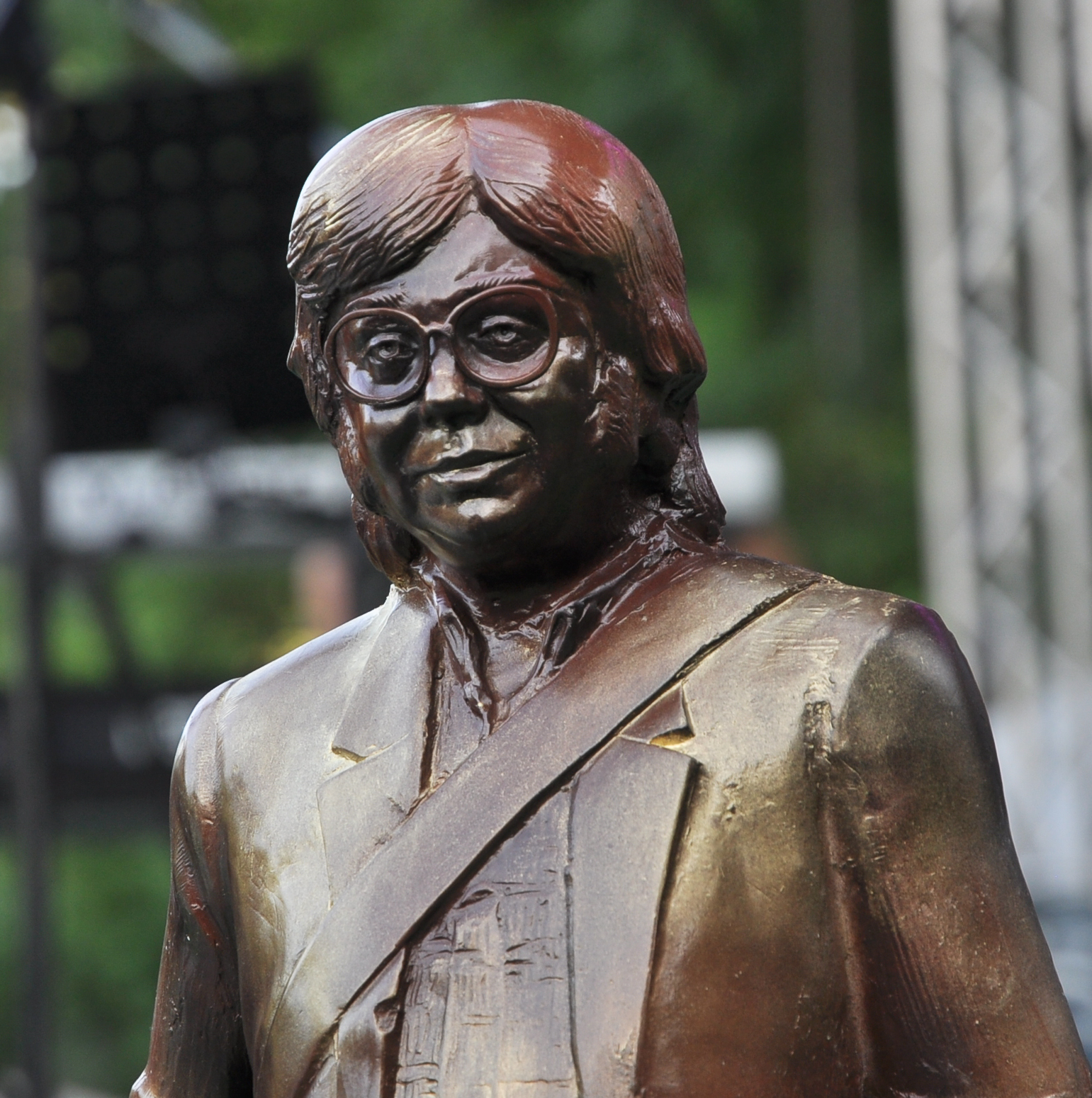
- Statue of Georgi Minchev

Background information
- Born: Georgi Minchev; 9 April 1943; Sofia, Bulgaria
- Died: 18 February 2001 (aged 57) Sofia, Bulgaria
- Genres: Rock, blues, blues rock, psychedelic rock, hard rock
- Occupations: musician, songwriter, singer
- Instruments: Vocals, harmonica, guitar
- Years active: 1965–2000
- Website: goshominchev.com

Georgi Minchev (Bulgarian: Георги Минчев; 9 April 1943 – 18 February 2001), also called Gosho Minchev or Zhoro Minchev, was a Bulgarian rock musician, singer, songwriter and TV presenter.

== Career and Legacy ==
He is best known as one of the pioneers of the rock music genre in Bulgaria as well as one of the advocates of the restoration of the democracy in the country. Many of his songs became classic rock hits most notably White Silence, Blessed years, The Bulgarian Rock, Balance, The Song of the singer, Alone at the Bar, A Story with Guitar and Almost Midnight.

During the 1990s, he was a co-founder of the supergroup Stari Mutsuni (Old faces) which featured also Petar Gyuzelev and Georgi Markov of Shturtsite and Ivaylo Kraychovski and Ivan Lechev of FSB.

Credited as Gueorgui Mintchev, an excerpt of his oratorio, Starobulgarski Chroniki, "Spis Le, Milke Li" (If You Are Sleeping, Milke) recorded in Rhodopes by the Bulgarian State Television Female Vocal Choir in 1973 by Marcel Cellier was released on Elektra Nonesuch's compilation, Le Mystère des Voix Bulgares Volume Two in 1988.

After his death in 2001, the rock music festival "Flower for Gosho" was established in his honor. It takes place in Sofia during the summer.

== Discography ==
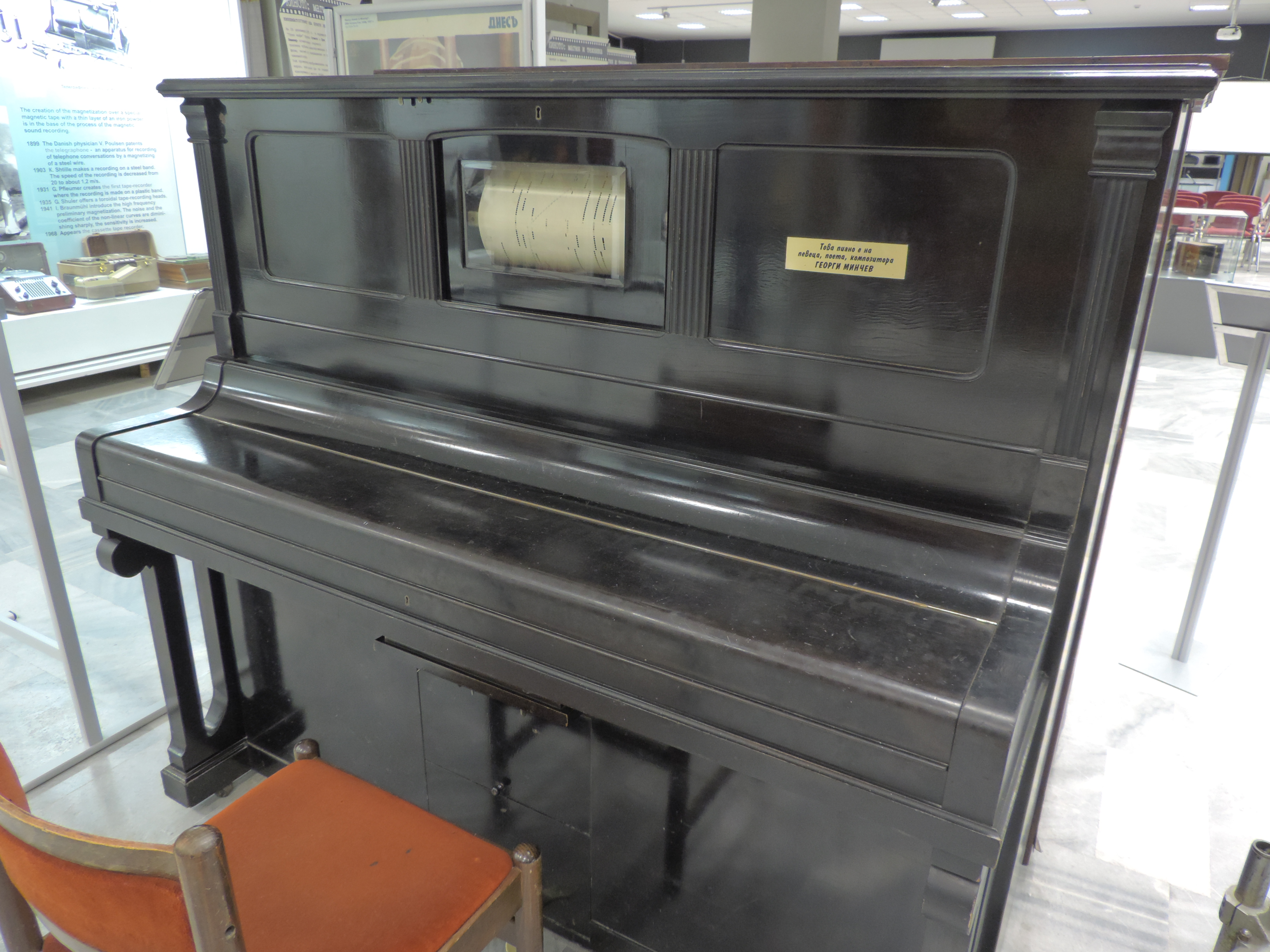
The mechanical piano of Georgi Minchev, exhibited in the National Polytechnic Museum in Sofia

=== Studio albums ===
- BG Rock / (Българският рок) (1987)
- Rock'n'Roll Veterans / (Рокенрол ветерани) (1989)
- Alone at the bar / (Сам на бара) (1994)
- Balance / (Равносметка) (1995)
- White Silence / (Бяла тишина) (1997)
- A Story with Guitar / (История с китара) (1999)
- The World of Tomorrow / (Le Monde De Demain) (2000)
