= BG Rock =

Studio album by Georgi Minchev
- Released: 1987
- Genre: Rock
- Label: Balkanton
- Producer: Petar Slavov; Ivaylo Kraychovski

Georgi Minchev chronology
BG Rock (1987)	Rock'n'Roll Veterans (1989)

BG Rock is the first solo album by the Bulgarian rock musician Georgi Minchev, released in 1987 by the state-owned record company Balkanton. The producers were the well known Bulgarian musicians Petar Slavov and Ivaylo Kraychovski.

The album was originally released on Cassette and Vinyl LP. In 1997, it was re-released on CD format together with the Minchev's second LP Rock'n'Roll Veterans (1989). Most of the songs obtained wide popularity and became classic hits of the Bulgarian rock music genre, most notably "The Bulgarian Rock", "We, The Musicians", "Almost Midnight" and "The Singer's Song".

Despite the fact that Georgi Minchev started his career in the 1960s, he managed to release his first LP not until 1987 because of the artist's constant clash with the local communist authority.

== Track listing ==
All lyrics are written by Georgi Minchev.

Side A:

1. "Българският рок"/"The Bulgarian Rock" (Minchev, N. Kacharov) - 2:50
2. "Ние, музикантите"/"We, The Musicians" (Minchev, P. Gyuzelev) - 3:40
3. "Есен в Созопол"/"Autumn in Sozopol" (Minchev, I. Nikolov) - 3:45
4. "Малък “Фиат”"/"A Small Fiat" (Minchev, A. Dechev) - 2:33
5. "Почти полунощ"/"Almost Midnight" (Minchev, A. Dechev) - 3:42

Side B:

1. "Д-р Иванов"/"Dr. Ivanov" (Minchev, A. Stanchev) - 3:15
2. "Песента на певеца"/"The Singer's Song" (Minchev, K. Atanasov) - 2:52
3. "Урок по Рок"/"A Rock'N'Roll Lesson" (Minchev) - 2:19
4. "Юли"/"July" (Minchev, A. Stanchev) - 2:58
5. "Стари тъжни песни"/"Old Sad Songs" (Minchev, V. Kazasyan) - 2:52

== Personnel ==
- Georgi Minchev - All Vocals
- Konstantin Tsekov, Rumen Boyadzhiev - Keyboards
- Kuzman Birbuchukov - Guitars, bass
- Ivan Lechev - Guitars
- Ivaylo Kraychovski - Bass Guitar
- Yordan Kapitanov - Trumpet
- Tsvetan Petrov - Trumpet
- Lyudmil Georgiev - Clarinet
- Konstantin Atanasov
- Nedyalko Neykov
- Hristiyan Tsekov
