= Yesterday (1988 film) =

1988 film by Ivan Andonov

- Theatrical release poster
- Directed by: Ivan Andonov
- Written by: Vlado Daverov; Ivan Andonov
- Based on: Yesterday by Vlado Daverov
- Produced by: Ivan Petkov
- Starring: Hristo Shopov; Sofiya Kuzeva; Georgi Staykov
- Cinematography: Krasimir Kostov
- Edited by: Albena Katerinska
- Music by: Kiril Marichkov
- Distributed by: Boyana Film
- Release date: 25 January 1988
- Running time: 84 minutes
- Country: Bulgaria
- Language: Bulgarian

Yesterday (Bulgarian: Вчера, romanized: Vchera) is a 1988 Bulgarian drama film directed by Ivan Andonov and based on Vlado Daverov's semi-autobiographical novel of the same name. It stars Hristo Shopov, Sofiya Kuzeva and Georgi Staykov as students at a boarding school in Lovech in the late 1960s.

Shortly after the film's release, its final scene where the characters take a blood oath became a cult classic, and popularised the song "Kletva", which students began singing at their graduation proms.

== Plot ==
At the end of the 1960s, Dana, the daughter of a diplomat in London, returns to Bulgaria and is enrolled in a boarding language school where mostly children of high party functionaries study. Ivan comes from an upper class family, and even his serious offenses are forgiven, while Rostislav is admitted to the school on an academic merit basis, and even the slightest mistake can cause him to be expelled. Their classmate Marina is a girl who loves gossip and drama, and involving others in it. The students fall in love with the Beatles' music. Professor Naydenov invites Ivan to play the role of Holden Caulfield in a theatrical production of The Catcher in the Rye.

The young people are excited by the eternal themes of justice, love and friendship — humane ideas that challenge the prevailing totalitarian ideology. At the same time, the school is investigating a student's pregnancy and the teachers are nervous. At the end of the film, Dana's father takes her away from school, and Rostislav is caught in a river current and drowns. The other students take а blood oath.

== Cast ==
- Hristo Shopov as Ivan
- Sofiya Kuzeva as Dana
- Georgi Staykov as Rostislav
- Georgi Rusev as Principal Tzonchev
- Nikola Rudarov as Baramov
- Pavel Popandov as the P.E. teacher
- Maria Stefanova as Professor Bitsevska
- Svetla Todorova as Marina
- Stoyan Aleksiev as Professor Naydenov
- Krasimir Rankov as the Inspector
- Petar Popyordanov as Professor Kostov
- Kosta Tsonev as Vera's father

== Production ==
=== Development and writing ===
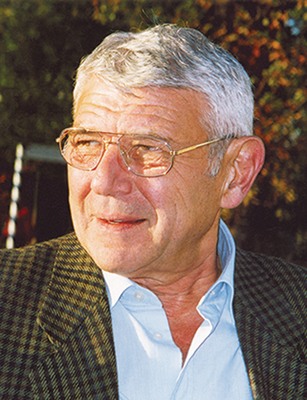
Ivan Andonov, the film's director.

The film's script is based on Vlado Daverov's semi-autobiographical novel Yesterday. In his novel, Daverov describes school life at the Ernst Telmann German High School in Lovech. He was expelled from the school for chopping up a wooden desk in order to light a stove and keep his girlfriend warm. This scene was recreated in the film.

Director Vasil Zhivkov came up with the initial idea for a film adaptation of Yesterday, which Daverov accepted. The script was approved by Boyana Film's cinematographic collective; however, Zhivkov and Daverov got into an argument, after which the head of the collective offered Ivan Andonov to become the film's new director. Andonov agreed to do it under the condition that he would be allowed to include some of his own experiences from his student years in the script, in particular his fascination with the Beatles' 1968 self-titled album. For three months, Daverov visited Andonov's studio every day. When they finished the script, the two broke down in tears as they felt that they had "struck a goldmine".

=== Casting ===
Andonov cast some of his personal favourite actors in the roles of the school staff: Georgi Rusev was cast as Principal Tzonchev, and Nadia Todorova as a cleaner. Andonov was impressed by director Nikola Rudarov's cameo appearance as the cameraman in the 1968 film One Shooting Day, and cast him in the role of the math teacher, Professor Baramov. The role of the English teacher was played by Christine Bartlett, a Scottish teacher who taught English at the First English Language School in Sofia.

For the roles of the students, Andonov conducted screen tests with many students from the National Academy for Theatre and Film Arts, as well as other students from Sofia. Petar Popyordanov was initially cast as a background character, mainly because of his bad speech; however, due to his improvisations, his character eventually became one of the main characters. Georgi Staykov was the first young actor to join the cast. Andonov had previously cast him in a small role in his film Dreamers (1987), and he even considered casting him as Ivan, the film's main character, but in the end decided to give the role to Hristo Shopov. He envisioned Ivan as "mysterious", which was the complete opposite of Staykov's personality, which is why gave him the role of Rostislav. A drama student from the Academy was initially cast as Dana; however, Daverov insisted on Sofia Kuzeva playing the role, to which Andonov agreed.

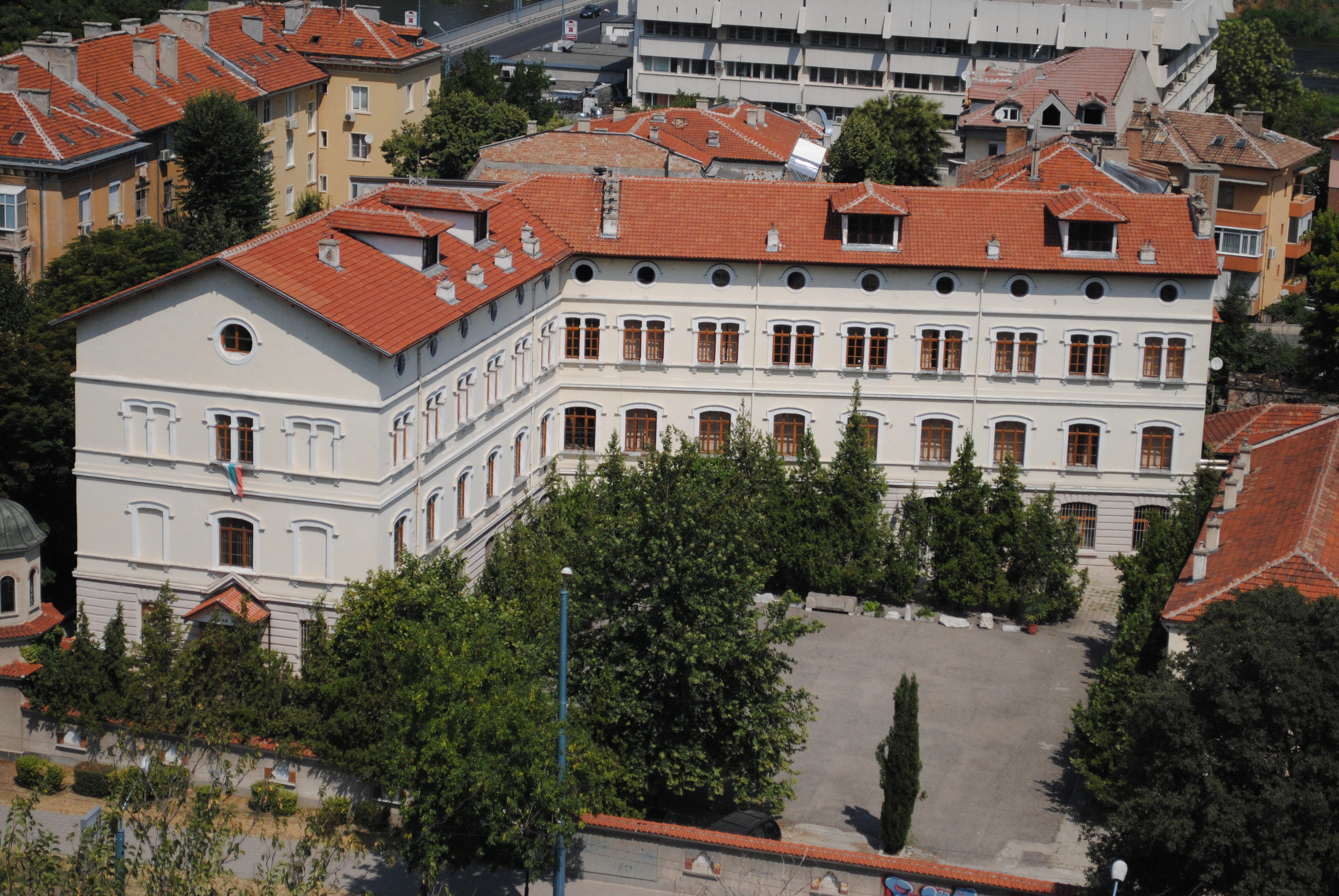
The Plovdiv Theological Seminary, where most of the film's scenes were filmed.

The role of Ivan's father was given to the Boris Lukanov, an actor at the Ivan Vazov National Theatre. The scene, in which he explains to his son why he was fired from the position of editor-in-chief at the magazine he worked for, was cut during editing, as it did not correspond to Andonov's creative vision. This is the only scene filmed outside the school grounds.

=== Filming ===
Andonov insisted that the actors do not rehearse at home. They visited his studio daily according to a schedule, where Andonov worked with everyone individually, and then brought them together to rehearse some of the scenes. Most of the scenes were filmed in 1987 in the building of Plovdiv's Stage Arts School (now Plovdiv Theological Seminary).

The students' dormitory set was in Sofia, and the drowning scene was filmed near Lovech, where a 17-year-old student at the German Language School drowned in 1965. While filming the scene, Staykov was caught by a current and disappeared for a long time. The film crew panicked, with some crew members jumping in to save him. Staykov was in good physical shape and escaped the current.

== Music ==
The film's soundtrack was composed by Kiril Marichkov. It consists of a track called "Utroto", which only appears in the film during the intro and at other points in slower instrumental versions, and a track called "Kletva", which appears in the film's final credits and during the end credits. "Kletva" was covered by British indie pop band Ladytron for their 2008 album Velocifero.

"Kletva" was later re-recorded and released on Marichkov's 1997 album Zodia Shturets, while "Utroto" would first be released in 2015 on The Best of Kiril Marichkov and Shturcite, and then later in 2020 on Marichkov's album 75.

== Bibliography ==
- Kovachev, Pencho (2008). 50 Golden Bulgarian Films. Zahari Stoyanov. ISBN 978-954-09-0281-4.
