= Sea Garden (Burgas) =

Park in Burgas, Bulgaria

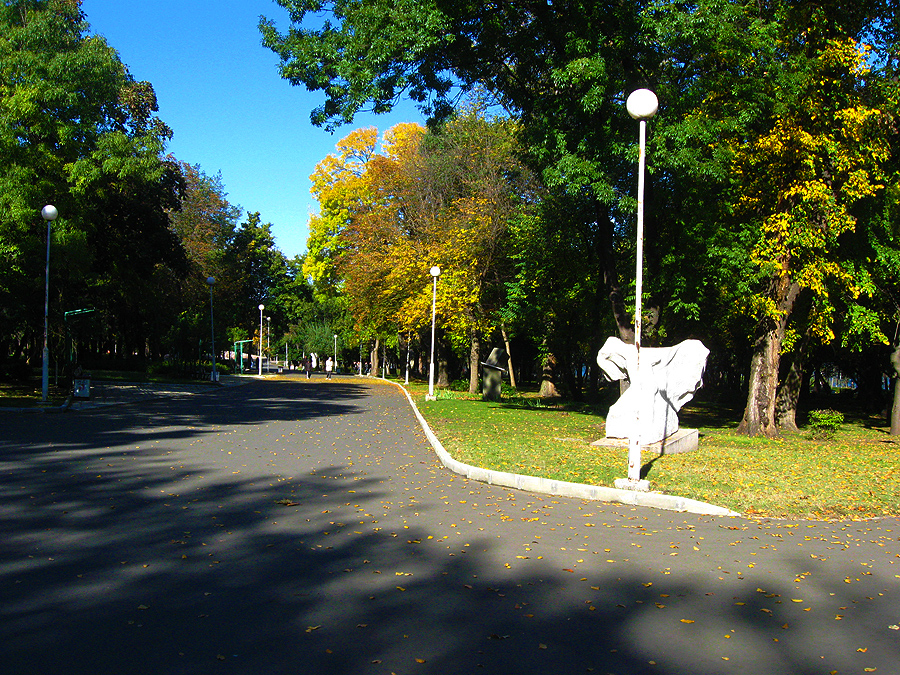
One of the alleys in the Garden

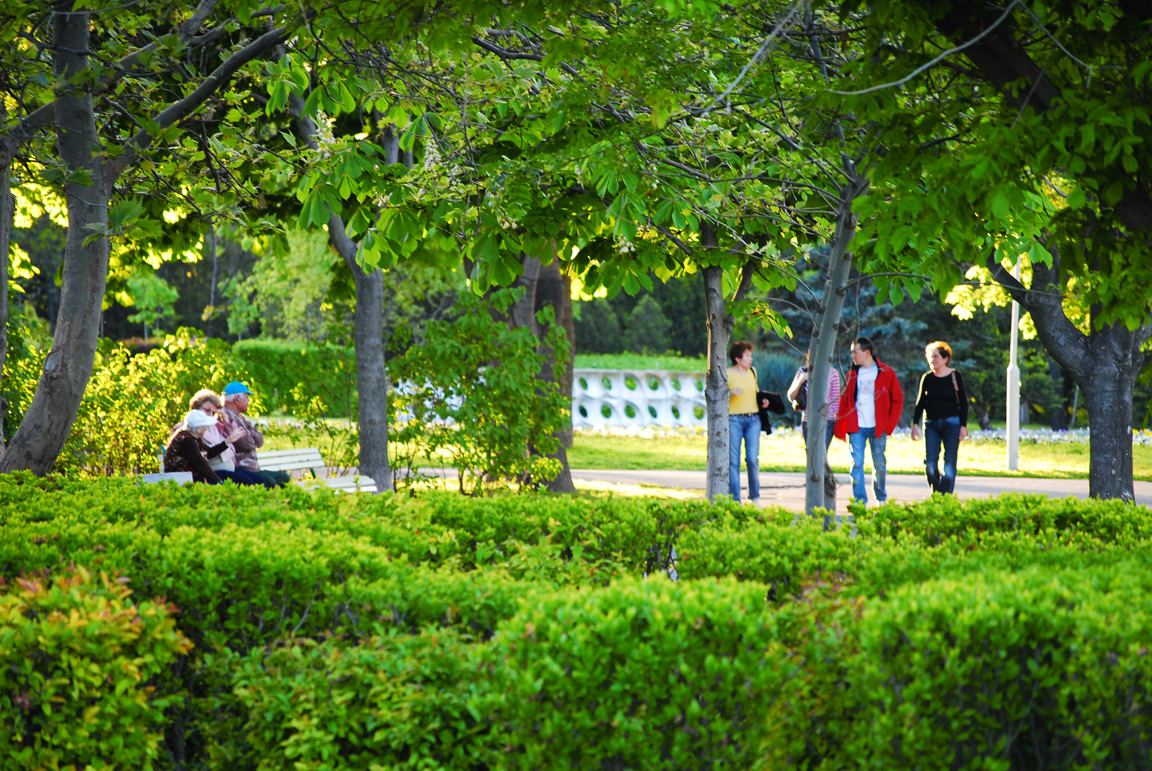
In a peaceful recess in the Sea Garden

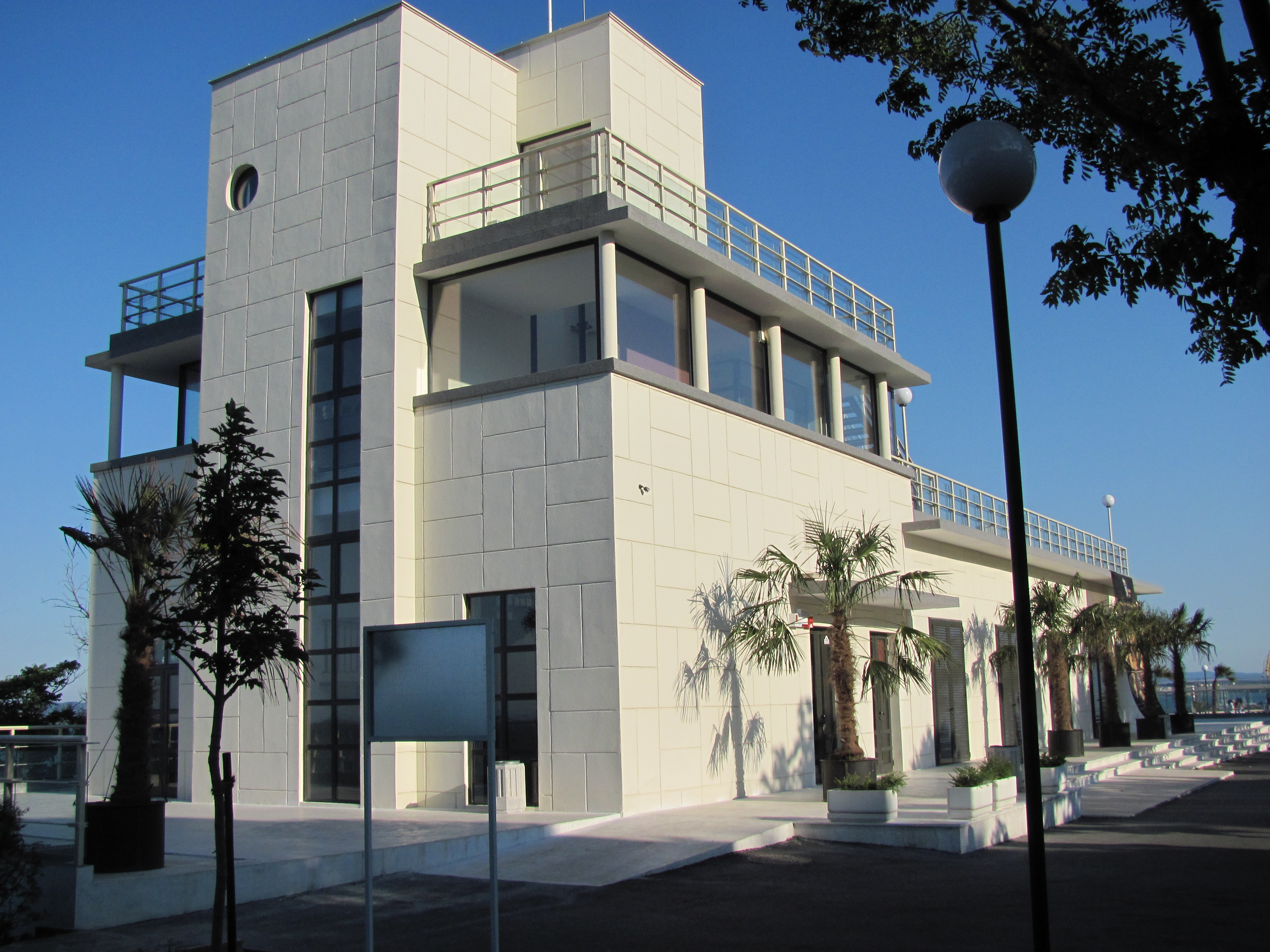
The Morsko Kazino (Marine Casino) in the Sea Garden of Burgas

The Sea Garden (Bulgarian: Морска градина, Morska gradina) is the Bulgarian port city of Burgas' largest and best known public park. It is located along the city's coast on the Black Sea and it is an important tourist attraction and a national monument of landscape architecture on the Balkans.

Near the Sea Garden is located one of the most popular district of Burgas - district of Lazur. The area of the park is around 800 decares. The park is planted with trees and shrubs. In those areas there are many sculptures sparsed around. The most important monument probably is the monument of Alexander Pushkin.

== History ==
The first trees in the park were planted by the soldiers of the 24th Infantry Regiment (created in 1889).

In 1910 the architect Georgi Duhtev (* August 7, 1885; † November 9, 1955) was hired by the Municipality of Burgas to start the construction of the Sea Garden. The young architect became the governor of the Borisova Gradina in Sofia. He turned the swamp between the city and the sea into one of the most beautiful parks in Bulgaria. Thanks to his passion for exotic plants, today there are hundreds of plants in the Garden from all continents, and the old part of the Sea Garden, or quarter, is a monument to the art of landscape design and gardening.

In 1936 the first bay is opened and two years later in 1938 the Marine Casino is built.

In 1975 a new bay is built with steel-reinforced concrete structure.

== Landmarks ==
- Summer Theatre
- Summer Scene "Snail"
- the Pantheon
- the Marine Casino
- the Bay of Burgas
- the house of the creator
- Exhibition of flowers "Flora"
- Alley and monument "A. Pushkin"

=== Festivals ===
- The Sand Sculpture Festival
- Spirit of Burgas
- Sea Garden Festival (since 2014)
- BlueZZ fest
- Burgas and the Sea (Бургас и морето, Burgas i moreto)
