= Svetoslav Vitkov =

Bulgarian singer

Svetoslav Vitkov Светослав Витков
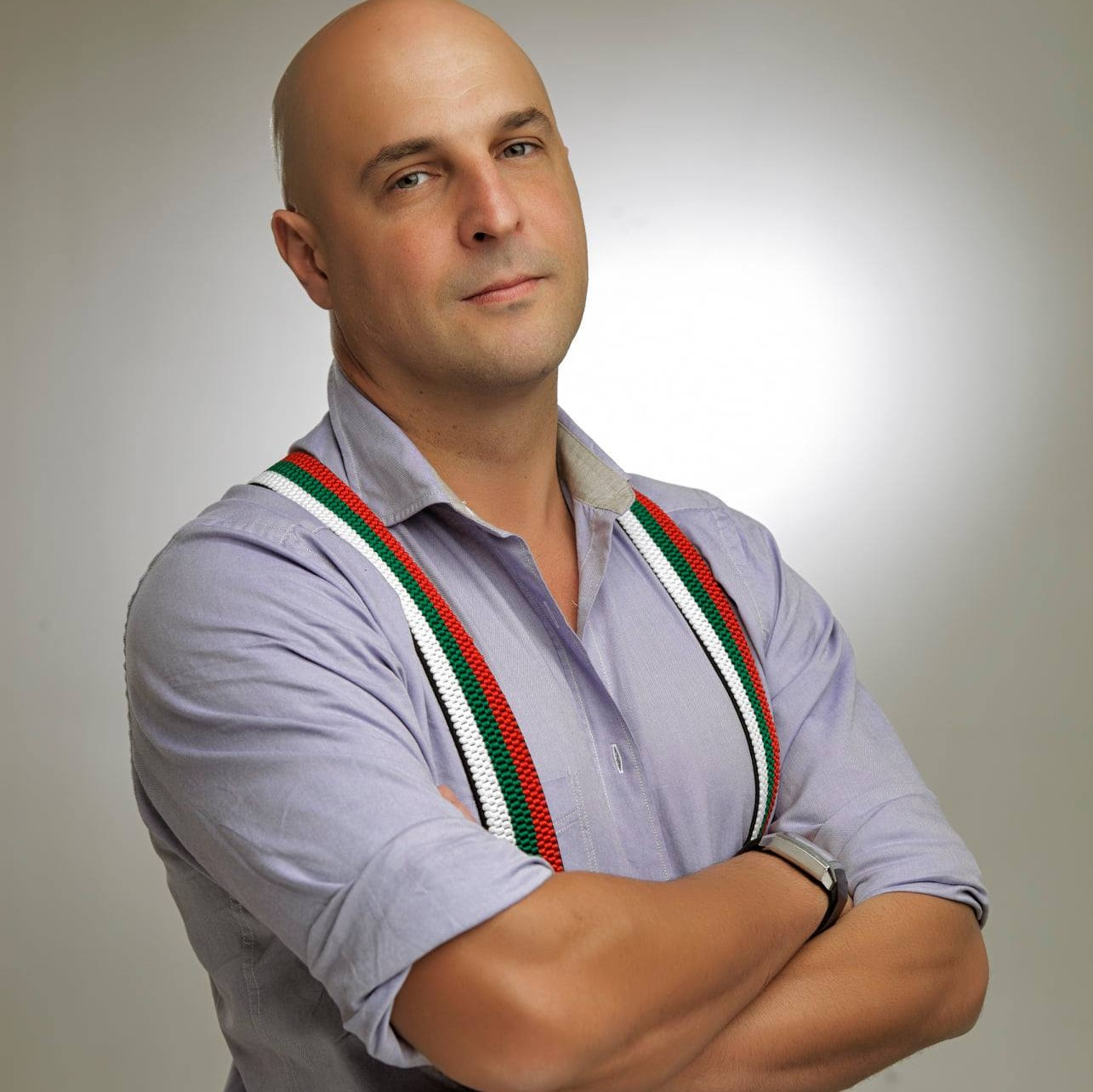
- Vitkov in 2021

Background information
- Born: Svetoslav Emilov Vitkov; 26 January 1971 (age 55); Gorno Barutin, Bulgaria
- Genres: Rock, punk, thrash metal, ska
- Occupations: Singer, politician, karate instructor
- Years active: 1991–present
- Labels: Unison RTM, Riva Sound, PolySound Inc., SKD Sound
- Member of: Svetlio & the Legends
- Formerly of: Hipodil

Svetoslav Emilov Vitkov (Bulgarian: Светослав Емилов Витков [svɛtoˈsɫaf ɛˈmiɫov ˈvitkof]; born 26 January 1971) is a Bulgarian singer and politician, best known for his work with Hipodil. In 2013, he founded the political party People's Voice.

== History ==
Svetoslav Emilov Vitkov was born on 26 January 1971 to Emil Vitkov and Nadezhda (née Kukova). His family from his mother's side are Bulgarians from the region of Macedonia. Vitkov has one brother named Nikolay.

He was first involved in karate in 1985, and has a black belt. He has taught karate since 1995.

Vitkov is a graduate of the Sofia High School of Mathematics.

In 1991, he joined the then-fledgling punk rock band Hipodil to replace its previous singer, Miroslav Telalov, who left the band to serve in the Bulgarian army.

In 2011, he and fellow band member Ventsislav Mitsov ran for president and vice president of Bulgaria.

He has written three books on his time with Hipodil and karate, among other things.

== Bibliography ==
- Blagodarenie na... (2005)
- Pogled po patya (2006)
- Bulgarno, ili isteriata Hipodil (2007)

== See also ==
- Hipodil
- Svetlio & the Legends
