= Nova Generacia =

Nova Generatsia (Bulgarian: Нова генерация, lit. 'New Generation') was a Bulgarian cold wave band. It was founded in 1987 by Dimitar Voev and existed in different lineups until Voev's death in 1992 at the age of 27.

== History ==
During Voev's life, and especially after his death, Nova Generacia achieved cult status.

In later years, the band appeared in front of 40,000 people in Sofia, opening for Depeche Mode on 21 June 2006. Dimitar Voev's vocal duties were taken up by his younger brother Simeon Voev.

== Members ==
- Dimitar Voev – lead vocals, bass guitar (until 1992)
- Kristiyan Kostov – guitar
- Kiril Manchev – drums
- Mihail Peshev – synthesizer
- Alina Tringova – vocals
- Lyudmil Milovanski – drums
- Dimitar Bozhidarov – guitar
- Katya Atanasova – synthesizer, vocals
- Simeon Voev – lead vocals (since 2006), guitar
- Georgi Stoilov – drums

== Discography ==
- 1987 – Вход Б (Vhod B)
- 1989 – BG Rock I
- 1991 – Forever
- 1992 – Отвъд смъртта (Otvud smurtta)
- 1998 – Завинаги ‘98 (Forever '98)
