= Kiril Marichkov =

Bulgarian rock musician (1944–2024)

- Кирил Маричков
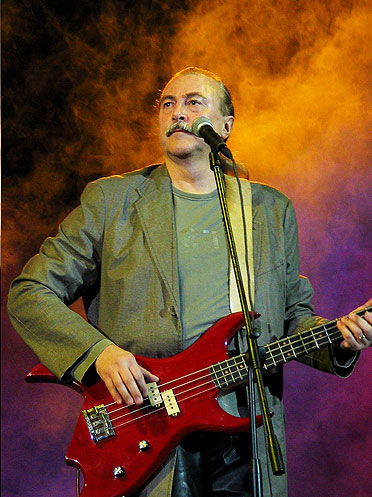
- Marichkov in 2013
- Born: Kiril Kirilov Marichkov; 30 October 1944; Sofia, Bulgaria
- Died: 11 October 2024 (aged 79); Selanovtsi, Vratsa Province, Bulgaria
- Relatives: Kiril K. Maritchkov (son)
- Musical career
- Genres: Pop rock; hard rock; progressive rock
- Occupation: Musician
- Instrument: Bass guitar
- Years active: 1962–2024
- Label: Balkanton
- Formerly of: Shturtsite

Kiril Marichkov (Bulgarian: Кирил Маричков; 30 October 1944 – 11 October 2024) was a Bulgarian rock musician and politician. He is best known for having been the frontman of the band Shturtsite.

== Life and career ==
Marichkov was born in Sofia to Kiril Marichkov and Irina Levieva on 30 October 1944. He was a descendant of Bulgarian politician Georgi Stranski; his maternal grandfather was composer Boris Leviev, and his paternal grandfather was architect Kiro Marichkov. Boris Leviev (1902–1968), born Baruch Levi, was descended from a Sephardic Jewish family. As an adult, he converted to Christianity and changed his name. His daughter Irina, Marichkov's mother, was an artist. Marichkov had a sister, Lyuba, born in 1947. The elder Kiril studied law and diplomacy, and was the first Bulgarian ambassador to the Vatican. The younger Kiril played piano, clarinet, bass-guitar and guitar from a young age. He studied engineering before beginning his musical career.

In 1962 he founded one of the first Bulgarian rock bands, the "Bandaratsite" (Bulgarian: Бъндараците). After the dissolution of the Bandaritsite in 1966, he formed the band "Shturtsite" (Bulgarian: Щурците, lit. 'The Crickets') alongside drummer Petar Tsankov in 1967. Two other members, Petar Gyuzelev and Veselin Kisyov, joined the group. Shturtsite was in existence for 40 years; it performed over 3000 concerts and was one of the most successful Bulgarian rock bands of the 20th century. Marichkov was the frontman of the band, additionally performing lead vocals, and bass guitar. He was also the main composer of the band.

In 1990, at a time of great political changes at the fall of the Communist regime in Bulgaria, his song "Az sym prosto Chovek" (Bulgarian: Аз съм просто Човек, lit. 'I'm only Human') became an unofficial anthem of the opposition. During this period, Marichkov was elected member of the Grand National Assembly as a part of the Union of Democratic Forces.

Marichkov composed soundtracks for 14 films, including Vchera (Bulgarian: Вчера, lit. 'Yesterday'), Rio Adio (Bulgarian: Адио Рио), "Indianski igri" (Bulgarian: Индиански игри, lit. 'Indian games'), "Vampiri-talasami" (Bulgarian: Вампири-таласъми, lit. 'Vampires-ghouls'), and "Dunav most" (Bulgarian: Дунав мост, lit. 'The bridge over the Danube'). He was a co-founder of the Bulgarian rock radio station "Radio Tangra". 2008 saw British indie-pop band Ladytron (fronted by fellow Bulgarian Jew Mira Aroyo) cover "Kletva", the theme song to Vchera, on their album Velocifero, introducing Westerners to Bulgarian rock for the first time.

Marichkov had three solo albums – "Zodiya Shturets" (Bulgarian: Зодия штурец, lit. 'Zodiac Cricket') in 1997 and "Iskam da kazha" (Bulgarian: Искам да кажа, lit. 'I want to say') in 2002. In 2019 he released the album "75". In 2011, he was a coach in the Bulgarian version of The Voice, Glasat na Bulgaria.

In 2013, after Shturtsite broke up, he formed a band called Fondatsiyata (Bulgarian: Фондацията, lit. 'The Foundation') with other famous Bulgarian rock musicians, including Ivan Levchev, Dobrin "Doni" Vekilov, Slavcho Nikolov and Vencho Poromanski.

In 2010 he was awarded the Order of Saints Cyril and Methodius, first class, for his contributions to art and music. In 2020, he was awarded the Order of Stara Planina, first class; considered to be the highest honor bestowed by the Bulgarian government. He published his autobiography, Na praga na vremeto (Bulgarian: На прага на времето, lit. 'On the Threshold of Time') in 2023.

=== Death ===
While climbing to the stage for a concert of Fondatsiyata in the village of Selanovtsi on 11 October 2024, Marichkov fell and suffered a severe brain injury. Paramedics were called, but he died in the ambulance. Marichkov was 79.

Bulgarian President Rumen Radev expressed his condolences, as did Bulgarian singers Lili Ivanova, Orlin Goranov, and Maria Ilieva, and Bulgarian politicians Slavi Trifonov, Boyko Borisov, Atanas Atanasov, and Vasil Terziev. On 13 October, hundreds of guitarists played Marichkov's song "Kletva" in front of the National Palace of Culture in Sofia. Marichkov's funeral occurred on 15 October 2024 at the Saint Sophia Church in Sofia.

== Discography ==
=== With Shturtsite ===
| Year | Title | Translation | Source |
|---|---|---|---|
| 1976 | Щурците '76 | Shturtsite 76 | |
| 1978 | Щурците '78 | Shturtsite 78 | |
| 1980 | 20-ти век | 20th Century | |
| 1982 | Вкусът на времето | The Taste of Time | |
| 1985 | Конникът | The Rider | |
| 1987 | Мускетарски марш | Musqueteer's March | |
| 1988 | 20 години по-късно | 20 Years Later | |
| 1998 | 30 години Щурците | 30 Years of Shturtsite | |
| 2008 | На прага на сърцето | On the Doorstep of the Heart | |

=== Solo ===
| Year | Title | Source |
|---|---|---|
| 1997 | Zodiac Cricket | |
| 2002 | I want to say | |
| 2019 | 75 | |
