= Upsurt =

Bulgarian hip-hop band

- Origin: Sofia, Bulgaria
- Genres: Hip hop
- Years active: 1996–present
- Labels: Riva Sound Records; Da, Da; Free Agents; Facing the Sun
- Members: Itso Hazarta; Bate Ventsi
- Past members: Shlevi; Butch
- Website: upsurt.net

Upsurt (Bulgarian: Ъпсурт, [əpˈsurt]) is a Bulgarian hip-hop band founded in the beginning of 1996 by childhood friends Itso Hazarta, Butch, Bat 'Bro' Ventsi and Panchev. Their first records were recorded in Sudibula studio in January 1996. After a while, Shlevi Panchev left the band and only three members remained.

The band have released four albums during their career. Since the fourth and to date final, Quattro, in 2005, the band have opted to release singles instead of albums.

In 2019, Butch left the band, leaving only Itso and Ventsi.

== Discography ==
=== Albums ===
- Bozdugan (Боздуган, Mace) (1999)
- Chekai malko (Чекай малко, Wait a Bit) (2002)
- Pop-Folk (2003)
- Quattro (2005)

=== Other singles ===
- Втора цедка (2006, featuring Mala Rodriguez)
- 50 лева разходи (2006)
- Звездата (2007)
- Doping test (2009)
- Мрън, мрън (2010)
- Кради, кради (2011)
- Бела жига (2012)
- Ослушай се (2013)
- Този танц (2017)
- Като цяло (2024)

=== Videos ===
- Live (2006)
- Концертът на годината (2006, split DVD with Review and Hipodil)
