= Ostava =

Bulgarian alternative rock band

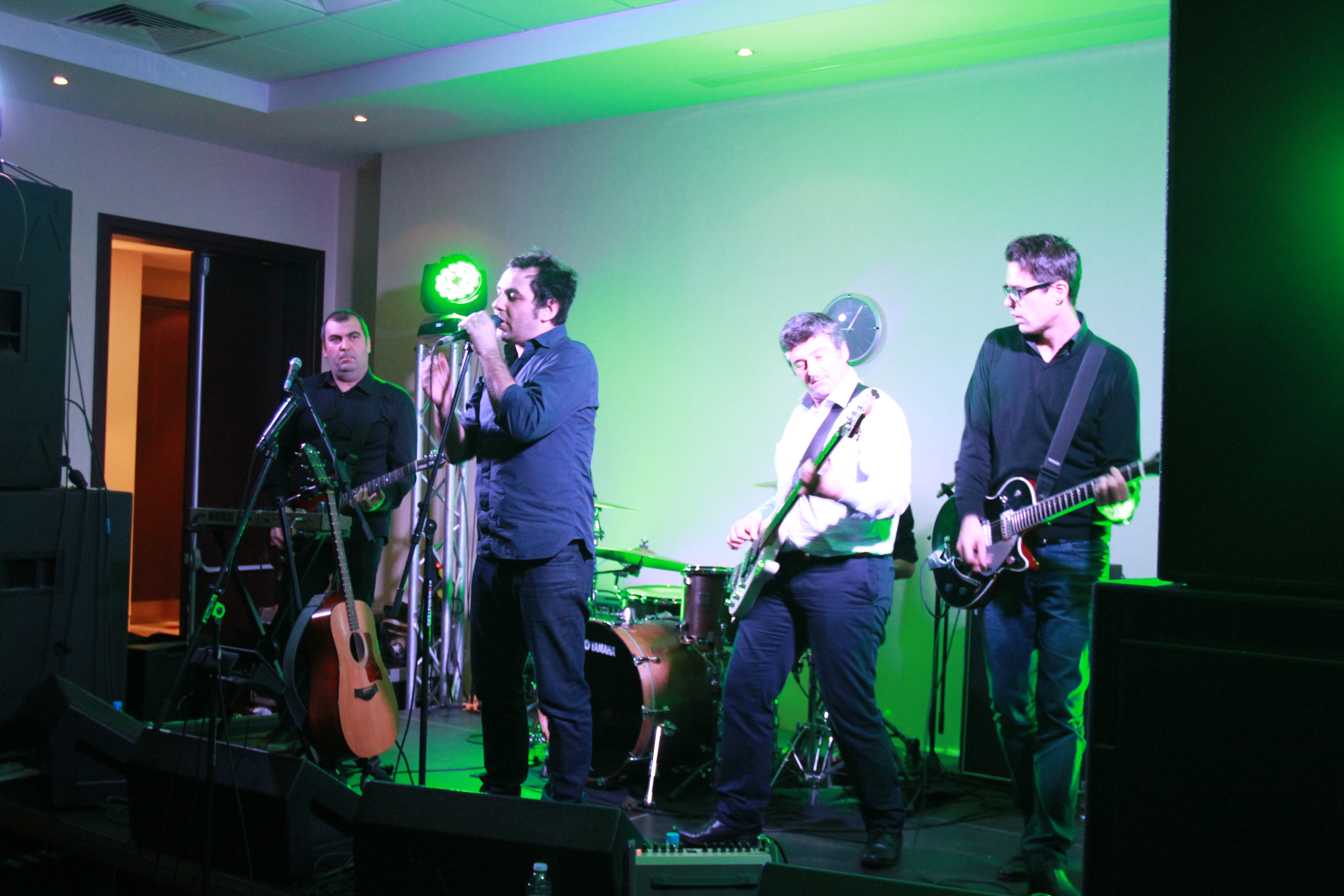

Background information
- Origin: Gabrovo, Bulgaria
- Genres: Alternative rock
- Years active: 1991–present
- Labels: Riva Sound; Stars records Stain Studio; Virginia Records/Universal
- Members: Svilen Noev; Georgi Georgiev; Daniel Petrov; Boyan Petkov; Mihail Shishkov; Alexander Marburg

Ostava is an alternative rock band from Bulgaria. It was formed in 1991, and released a long-playing record in 2000.

== History ==
=== Formation and early years ===
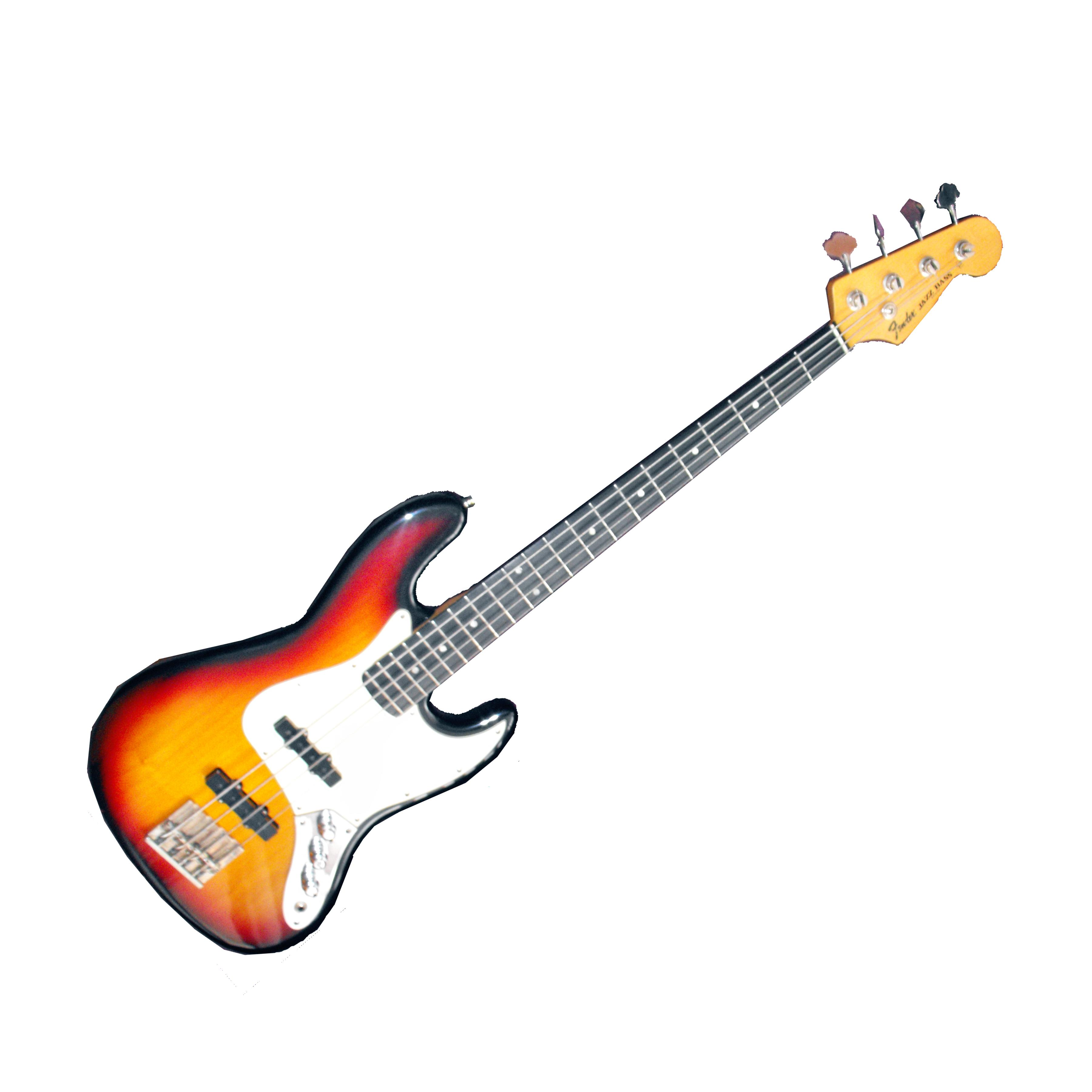
Fender Jazz Bass played by Boyan Petkov

Ostava was formed in 1991 by university students Georgi Georgiev (lead vocals and guitar), Boyan Petkov (bass), Dragomir Dimitrov (drums). Singer-songwriter Svilen Noev joined in 1995, bringing in a handful of new songs and a new approach to song writing. He changed places with Georgi Georgiev and the band began playing songs written and sung chiefly by Noev. However, Georgiev is given lead vocals on several songs. Drummer Daniel Petrov replaced Dragomir Dimitrov in 1999, thus forming the line-up that would later record the group's first LP. Prior to Petrov's joining Ostava was enjoying slight critical praise and no commercial success whatsoever.

=== Ping Pong (2000) ===
Ostava's first long-playing record was released in 2000, receiving overally positive reviews. The album alternates between melancholic, moody ballads and more guitar-driven tracks. The group quickly gained popularity, especially after "Would you come with me?" (Bulgarian: "Ще дойдеш ли с мен?") won the "Best rock/alternative song of the year" award at the MM Music awards. By this time Ostava were already performing regularly in various venues in Sofia and across Bulgaria.

=== After Love in the Time of War (2002) ===
"After Love in the Time of War" (Bulgarian: След любов по време на война) (alternative translation "After love in times of war") is arguably Ostava's most significant record to date. The album demonstrates the further development and elaboration of Noev's songwriting techniques and Georgiev's guitar work. Gifted multi-instrumentalist Mihail Shishkov joined the band, adding the sense of maturity and ripeness to its sound. The album was very well received and established Ostava as one of the attention-worthy Bulgarian rock acts. By this time the band had already acquired a solid and loyal following.

=== Mono (2004) ===
2003 saw another line-up change. Drummer Daniel Petrov left both Ostava and Bulgaria. He was replaced by Vladimir Vasilev, who had made a name for himself playing for Animacionerite. With him on board, the band continued recording their third studio album. However, with Petrov returning a year and a half later, Vasilev was shown the door.

"Mono" was released in December 2004. As Noev put it, the album's sound was "far away from the melancholy Ostava is generally associated with". Indeed, "Mono" features several catchy soft rock tunes, vaguely resembling the existentialist themes of earlier works.

Nevertheless, the record received rapturous critical acclaim, with singles "Mono" and especially "Chocolate" topping Bulgarian charts.

=== Rock'n'Roll Song Designers? (2008) ===
The first single off their 2008 album "Rock'n'Roll Song Designers" is the controversially called "Sex in the morning". Additional mastering was done by 6-time Grammy-nominated Brad Blackwood. The track climbed to the leading spots of many rock / alternative charts nationwide, received positive reviews among the press and was accepted more than well by the fans. An invitation from MM TV to play the track live at the Annual Music Awards in 2007 followed, as well as a number of requests from foreign bands to support Ostava on-stage at their future gigs.

The second single from the new LP – "Baby", appeared in March 2008 with a video directed by Vassil Stefanov, who has been working with the band over the years and is responsible for a large number of Ostava's best videos. The song ended up at the top of the weekly chart of the biggest hard rock radio station in Bulgaria – zRock, only a few days after its first broadcast. A promotional gig in the well-known Sofia venue "Yalta" in April was held to back both its release and the release of the new album.

=== Ocean (2015) ===
In 2015 Ostava released their album Ocean. The album is available via the Amazon digital music store. Additionally, they have released a new best of live album.

== Important Gigs ==
In summer 2006, Ostava supported Ladytron at their second concert in this time at Sunny Beach, Bulgaria. Only a few months later they opened for Ian Brown as part of the MTV EXIT campaign against human exploitation and trafficking, which included Bulgaria among other countries. Two appearances at London's Brixton Telegraph followed. Ostava's last gig in front of a bigger audience was as a supporting act of one of the most successful alternative bands worldwide – Placebo at their one-off gig in Sofia on 18 June.

== As supporting act ==
Ostava have opened for several internationally acclaimed artists.

- Ladytron
- Lenny Kravitz
- Ian Brown
- Placebo

== Covers ==
While Ostava have never officially released a cover version, they do play covers occasionally. Songs that Ostava have covered live include:

- "There Is a Light That Never Goes Out" by The Smiths
- "The Man Who Sold the World" by David Bowie
- "Nothing Compares 2 U" by Prince
- "Creep" and "Karma Police" by Radiohead
- "Wonderwall" by Oasis
- "I Gotta Feeling" by The Black Eyed Peas
- "She's In Fashion" by Suede

== Discography ==
Studio albums:

- Ping-Pong (2000) (Пинг-Понг)
- After Love in the time of war (2002) (След любов по време на война)
- Mono (2004) (Моно)
- Rock'n'roll song designers? (2008)
- Ocean (2015)
- Oxygen (2022) (Кислород)

Live albums:

- Love in the time of war (2003)
- "The Best of Ostava (Live)" (2016)
