= Balkanton =

Bulgarian state-owned record company

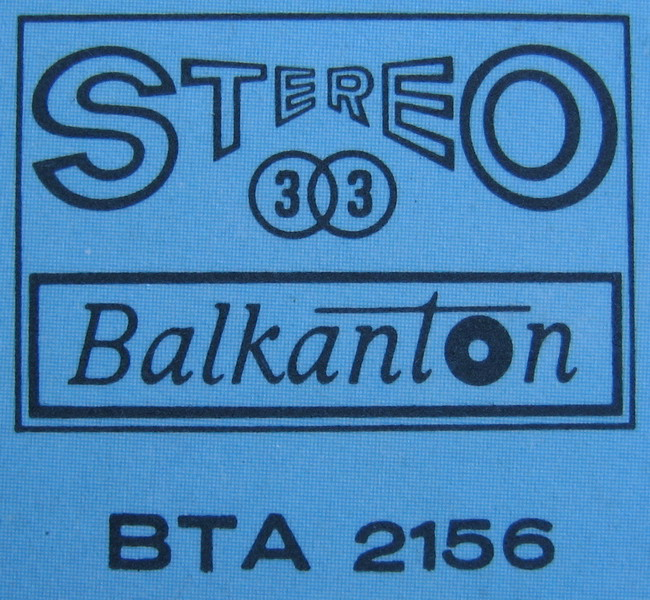
- Founded: 1952
- Genre: Various
- Country of origin: Bulgaria
- Location: Sofia

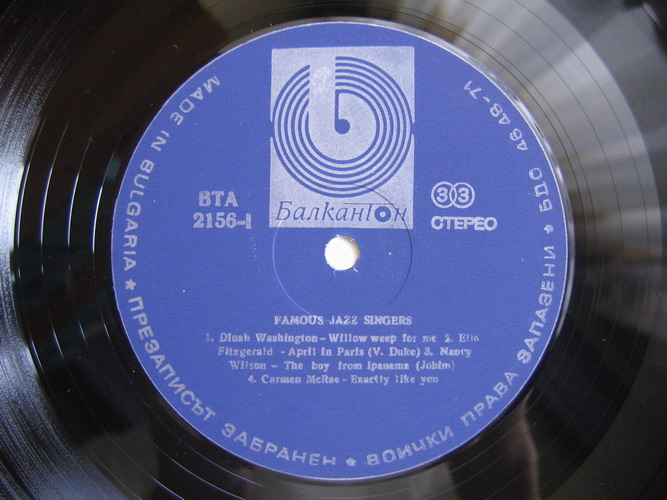
A Balkanton logo on a vinyl record

Balkanton (Bulgarian: Балкантон) was a state-owned record manufacturing company in Bulgaria founded in 1952. Many of the produced records were, or still are available in the countries of the former Eastern Bloc. Balkanton's plant in Sofia was equipped for all aspects of record manufacturing from recording the masters and pressing the vinyl records to printing the cover. Multi-channel sound recording was introduced in 1972 with equipment purchased from England. In 1982, Balkanton received its own digital recording equipment. By the mid-1980s, annual LP production reached 9 million units. The company mainly produced LPs and from 1980 it started to manufacture cassettes. Being the only record company in Bulgaria during four decades, Balkanton accumulated a vast library of performances of folk, classical, Bulgarian and foreign popular music, theater, poetry and more. After a couple of attempts to reorganize the company in the 1990s, it was finally privatized in 1999. Currently, Balkanton is reissuing some of its old recordings, mainly in the digital format, closing deals with digital distributors like Amazon.com, Spotify, 7digital and more.

Balkanton is located at No.6 Haidushka Polyana Street, Sofia, but is not known to have a company web presence. Second-hand Balkanton records are widely available at tourist-oriented market stalls in Sofia and other Bulgarian cities.
