= Bulgaria in the Eurovision Song Contest 2026 =

- Eurovision Song Contest 2026
- Participating broadcaster: Bulgarian National Television (BNT)
- Country: Bulgaria
- Selection process: Natsionalnata selektsiya
- Selection date: Artist: 31 January 2026; Song: 28 February 2026

Competing entry
- Song: "Bangaranga"
- Artist: Dara
- Songwriters: Anne Judith Wik; Cristian Tarcea; Darina Yotova; Dimitris Kontopoulos

Placement
- Semi-final result: Qualified (1st, 278 points)
- Final result: 1st, 516 points

Participation chronology

Bulgaria was represented at the Eurovision Song Contest 2026 with the song "Bangaranga", written by Anne Judith Wik, Cristian Tarcea, Darina Yotova and Dimitris Kontopoulos, and performed by Yotova under her stage name Dara. The Bulgarian participating broadcaster, Bulgarian National Television (BNT), returned to the contest after a three-year hiatus and organised the national final Natsionalnata selektsiya in order to select its entry for the contest.

Bulgaria was drawn to compete in the second semi-final of the Eurovision Song Contest which took place on 14 May 2026. Performing during the show in position 1, "Bangaranga" was announced among the top 10 entries of the second semi-final and therefore qualified to compete in the final on 16 May. It was later revealed that Bulgaria placed first out of the 15 participating countries in the semi-final with 278 points. In the final, Bulgaria performed in position 12 and placed first out of the 25 participating countries, winning the contest with 516 points. This marked Bulgaria's first victory in the contest, with it becoming the twenty-eighth nation to record a win.

== Background ==
Prior to the 2026 contest, Bulgarian National Television (BNT) had participated in the Eurovision Song Contest representing Bulgaria fourteen times since its first entry in 2005. Its best result in the contest was second, which it achieved in 2017 with the song "Beautiful Mess" performed by Kristian Kostov. To this point, it had achieved another two top five placings at the contest: in 2007 when "Water" performed by Elitsa Todorova and Stoyan Yankoulov placed fifth, and in 2016 when "If Love Was a Crime" performed by Poli Genova placed fourth. In 2022, Bulgaria failed to qualify for the final with the song "Intention" performed by Intelligent Music Project.

As part of its duties as participating broadcaster, BNT organises the selection of its entry in the Eurovision Song Contest and broadcasts the event in the country. The broadcaster has used various methods to select its entry in the past, including the national final Bŭlgarskata pesen v „Evroviziya” between 2005 and 2013 (used only to select the song in 2010 and 2013, with the artists internally selected), as well as full internal selections between 2016 and 2018, in 2021 and 2022. Bulgaria did not participate in the contest in 2014, 2015, 2019, and between 2023 and 2025; its most recent absence was originally motivated by financial constraints. On 31 October 2025, BNT announced it would return to the contest in 2026. The following day, Fakti.bg reported that BNT would organise a national final to select its entry for the contest; this was confirmed by the broadcaster on 18 November 2025, but it was not specified whether it would concern only the artist or both the artist and the song.

== Before Eurovision ==
=== Natsionalnata selektsiya ===
Natsionalnata selektsiya (Националната селекция) was the national final format developed by BNT in order to select its entry for the Eurovision Song Contest 2026. The event took place at BNT Studio 1 in Sofia, on the 24 and 31 January, and 28 February 2026, to determine the artist and song respectively. All shows, which was broadcast on BNT 1, as well as online via the broadcaster's website bnt.bg, was hosted by Georgi Lyubenov and Boryana Gramatikova, with Vladimira Ilieva serving as backstage host.

==== Format ====
The selection of the Bulgarian Eurovision entry took place over two stages. The first stage was the artist selection, which consisted of two televised shows on 24 and 31 January 2026, and involved 15 competing acts performing their own previous songs. In the first show, all 15 artists competed and eight acts were selected to advance to the second show based on the combination of votes from the public and a five-member expert jury. Each juror awarded a score from 1 (lowest) to 5 (highest) to each artist, while the public vote awarded a set of points from 1 (lowest) to 15 (highest). Initially, seven artists that had the highest number of points were supposed to advance, but due to a tie between two acts, both were selected to proceed. In the second show, the eight remaining artists were voted upon by the combination of the public vote and five-member expert jury in order to select the winning artist. Each juror awarded a score from 1 (lowest) to 5 (highest) to each artist, while the public vote awarded a set of points from 1 (lowest) to 8 (highest); the artist that had the highest number of combined points was declared the winner. The second stage was the song selection, which took place on 28 February 2026, which featured the winning artist performing three candidate songs. The winning song was selected via the 50/50 combination of votes from a public vote and a ten-member expert jury. Each juror awarded a score from 1 (lowest) to 3 (highest) to each song, and a set of points from 1 to 3 was distributed based on ranking of the combined scores. The public vote awarded an additional set of points from 1 to 3, and the song with the highest number of combined points was declared the winner. Viewers were able to cast a vote via BNT's website during all shows.

==== Competing artists ====
On 18 November 2025, BNT signed an agreement with Prophon to jointly select the competing artists for the national final, with acts invited based on data provided by Prophon on the Top 40 ranking of the most played artists on digital platforms in Bulgaria over the preceding eight months. The 15 competing acts were selected by a panel consisting of representatives of BNT and Prophon, and announced on 30 December 2025.

Natsionalnata selektsiya participating artists
- Dara
- Dara Ekimova
- Dia
- Elizabet
- Fiki
- Innerglow
- Kerana and Kosmonavtite
- Mihaela Marinova
- Mihaela Fileva
- Molec
- Mona
- Preyah
- Roksana
- Vall
- Veniamin

==== Artist selection ====
The artist selection stage consisted of two shows that took place on 24 and 31 January 2026. In the first show, eight artists instead of seven qualified to the second show due to a tie between Roksana and Innerglow, following the combination of votes awarded by a public vote and a five-member jury panel. In the second show, Dara was selected as the winning artist by the combination of votes awarded by the public and jury. The jury consisted of Milen Mitev, Vasil Petrov, Toni Dimitrova, Rushi Vidinliev and Petar Dundakov in the first show, and Nina Nikolina, Lubo Kirov, Bogdana Karadocheva, Krisko and Victoria Chalkitis in the second show.

In addition to the competing artists, guest performers in the first show were former Bulgarian Eurovision entrants – Kristian Kostov (2017), Victoria Georgieva (2021) and Krisia Todorova (2014 junior contest) – while guest performers in the second show were Ivo Dimchev, Nevena Tsoneva, Eldar Gasimov (who won Eurovision for Azerbaijan in 2011 alongside Nikki), as well as Alis and Aidan (who would represent Albania and Malta in 2026, respectively).

Show 1 – 24 January 2026
R/O	Artist	Song	Jury	Public vote		Total	Place
R/O	Artist	Song	Jury	Votes	Points	Total	Place
1	Kerana and Kosmonavtite	"Zhiva" (Жива)	23	5,291	10	33	6
2	Elizabet	"Nostalgiya" (Носталгия)	18	700	1	19	15
3	Molec	"Veche znam" (Вече знам)	24	8,603	12	36	3
4	Dara Ekimova	"Disham" (Дишам)	21	3,110	4	25	12
5	Dia	"Grekhove" (Грехове)	18	2,144	3	21	13
6	Mihaela Marinova	"Strah ot samota" (Страх от самота)	24	9,973	13	37	2
7	Preyah	"Moma" (Мома)	24	5,557	11	35	4
8	Veniamin	"Da buda tvoi" (Да бъда твой)	21	3,275	5	26	11
9	Vall	"Poslednata sulza" (Последната сълза)	19	937	2	21	13
10	Fiki	"Rise Up"	21	4,050	7	28	9
11	Mihaela Fileva	"Prilivi i otlivi" (Приливи и отливи)	22	3,654	6	28	9
12	Mona	"Zhiva" (Жива)	19	15,506	15	34	5
13	Roksana	"Sae roma"	23	4,665	8	31	7
14	Dara	"Nishto poveche" (Нищо повече)	25	15,477	14	39	1
15	Innerglow	"Chained in Love"	22	5,003	9	31	7

Show 2 – 31 January 2026
R/O	Artist	Song	Jury	Public vote		Total	Place
R/O	Artist	Song	Jury	Votes	Points	Total	Place
1	Roksana	"Kalimanku denku" (Калиманку денку)	16	2,997	1	17	8
2	Mona	"Sila" (Сила)	17	18,211	6	23	3
3	Preyah	"Edelvais" (Еделвайс)	18	5,677	3	21	5
4	Mihaela Marinova	"Under Pressure"	19	19,845	7	26	2
5	Molec	"Vyatura" (Вятъра)	17	9,952	4	21	6
6	Dara	"Thunder"	22	21,267	8	30	1
7	Innerglow	"Znak" (Знак)	16	3,743	2	18	7
8	Kerana and Kosmonavtite	"Nyama" (Няма)	18	10,104	5	23	4

==== Song selection ====
The song selection show took place on 28 February 2026, where the winning artist, Dara, performed three candidate songs. The winning song, "Bangaranga", was selected by the 50/50 combination of votes awarded by a public vote and a ten-member jury panel. The jury consisted of Milen Mitev, Vasil Petrov, Toni Dimitrova, Rushi Vidinliev, Petar Dundakov, Nina Nikolina, Lubo Kirov, Bogdana Karadocheva, Krisko and Victoria Chalkitis.

In addition to the competing songs, guest performers were Bion, Rob Money, Bon-Bon (which represented Bulgaria in Junior Eurovision 2007), Deep Zone Project (which represented Bulgaria in 2008), Senhit (who represented San Marino in 2011 and 2021) and Eva Marija (who represented Luxembourg in 2026).

Song selection – 28 February 2026
R/O	Song	Songwriter(s)	Jury		Public vote		Total	Place
R/O	Song	Songwriter(s)	Votes	Points	Votes	Points	Total	Place
1	"This Is Me"	Alma Dowdall; Darina Yotova; Dimitris Kontopoulos; Sharon Vaughn	12	1	1,075	1	2	3
2	"Curse"	Dimitris Kontopoulos; Sharon Vaughn	18	2	1,422	2	4	2
3	"Bangaranga"	Anne Judith Wik; Cristian Tarcea; Darina Yotova; Dimitris Kontopoulos	30	3	19,119	3	6	1

== At Eurovision ==
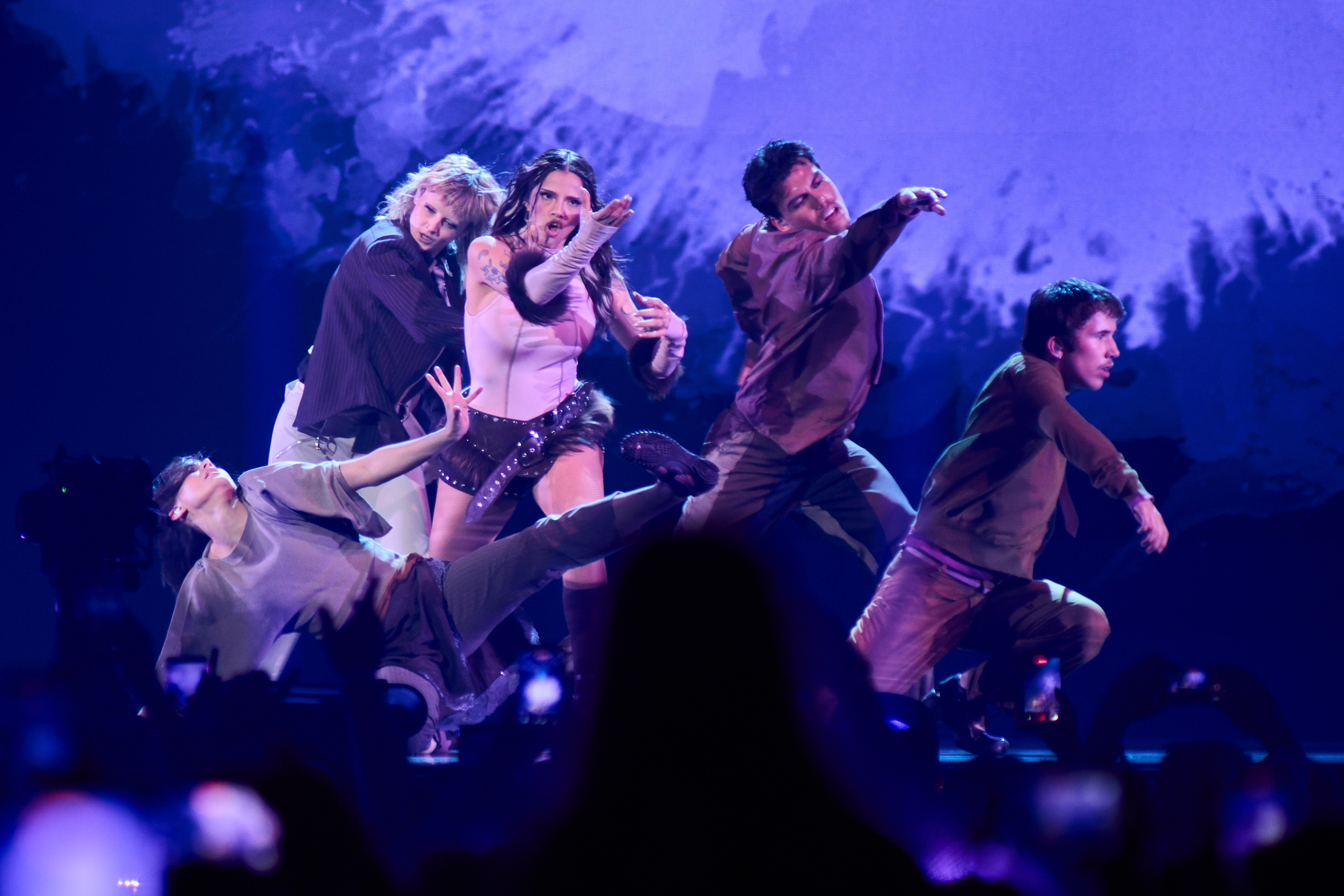
Dara during the second semi-final on 14 May 2026.

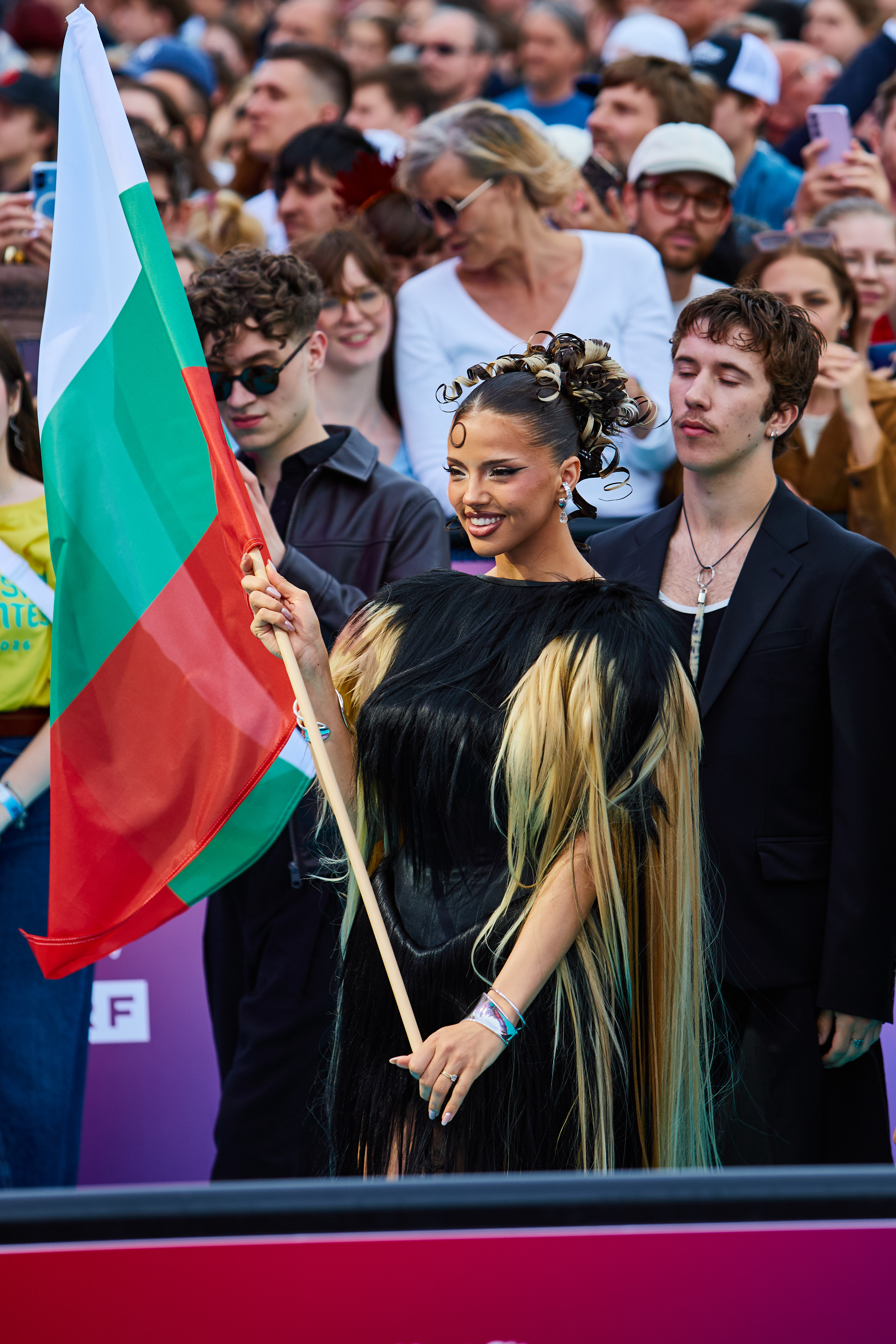
Dara and the Bulgarian delegation during the opening ceremony.

The Eurovision Song Contest 2026 took place at the Wiener Stadthalle in Vienna, Austria, and consisted of two semi-finals held on the respective dates of 12 and 14 May and the final on 16 May 2026. All nations with the exceptions of the host country and the "Big Four" (France, Germany, Italy and the United Kingdom) were required to qualify from one of two semi-finals in order to compete for the final; the top ten countries from each semi-final progressed to the final. On 12 January 2026, an allocation draw was held to determine which of the two semi-finals, as well as which half of the show, each country performed in; the European Broadcasting Union (EBU) split up the competing countries into different pots based on voting patterns from previous contests, with countries with favourable voting histories put into the same pot. Bulgaria was scheduled to open the second semi-final, preceding the entry from Azerbaijan.

In Bulgaria, BNT broadcast all shows on BNT 1, with live commentary from Elena Rosberg and Petko Kralev.

=== Semi-final ===
Keisha von Arnold and Fredrik Rydman created the choreography and directed the staging. Rydman had previously staged several entries, most notably Sweden in 2015, Finland in 2023 and Switzerland in 2024. Supporting dancers in the performance were Iker Cederblom Herrera, Ellinea Siambalis, Lisa Högström, and Mateo Cordova Pomo.

Bulgaria was allocated for the second semi-final, and later, was announced to perform in position one during the show, before the performance from Azerbaijan. Dara was joined by Ellinea Afroditi Aina, Iker Cederblom Herrera, Lisa Högström and Mateo Rolando Cordova Pomo as backing dancers for the performance, while Victoria Halkiti provided backing vocals. At the end of the show, the country was announced as a qualifier for the final, marking Bulgaria's first qualification for the final since 2021. It was later revealed that Bulgaria placed first out of the fifteen participating countries in the second semi-final with 278 points. In the jury vote, Bulgaria placed fifth with 94 points, whilst in the televote, Bulgaria placed first with 184 points.

=== Final ===
Following the semi-final, Bulgaria was drawn to in position 12 of the final, following the entry from Czechia and before the entry from Croatia. Dara took part in dress rehearsals on 15 and 16 May before the final, including the jury final where the professional juries cast their final votes before the live show on 16 May. Bulgaria placed 1st in the final, scoring 516 points; 312 points from the public televoting and 204 points from the juries. This marked Bulgaria's first victory in the Eurovision Song Contest, becoming the twenty-eighth country to win the event. This victory also breaks Alexander Rybak's 2009 record for the biggest point differential between a winner and runner-up in an edition.

=== Voting ===
Below is a breakdown of points awarded by and to Bulgaria in the second semi-final and in the final. Voting during the three shows involved each country awarding sets of points from 1-8, 10 and 12: one from their professional jury and the other from televoting. The Bulgarian jury consisted of Kostadin Todorov Filipov, Krasimir Nikolov Gyulmezov, Stefan Mihaylov Dimitrov, Joanna Nickolova Dragneva, who represented Bulgaria in 2008, Krisia Todorova, who represented Bulgaria in the Junior Eurovision Song Contest 2014, Maria Ilieva, and Valeria Valerieva Voykova. In the first semi-final, Bulgaria placed 1st with 278 points, marking the country's first qualification to the final since 2021. The country placed first in the televote, obtaining 184 points, and fifth in the jury vote with 94 points. In the final, Bulgaria placed 1st overall with 516 points, placing 1st in both the jury vote and the televote. This marked Bulgaria's first win in the contest to date and the first winning entry since 2017 to receive a unanimous first placing in both jury voting and televoting. Additionally, it broke the record for the largest winning margin over the runner-up, previously held by Alexander Rybak's "Fairytale" for Norway in 2009. The previous record of 169 points was surpassed with a new margin of 173 points. In the second-semi-final, Bulgaria scored twelve points in the jury vote from Denmark and twelve points in the televote from Austria, France, the United Kingdom, Luxembourg, Albania, Switzerland, Cyprus, Malta and the Rest of the World. In the final, Bulgaria scored twelve points in the jury vote from Denmark, Australia, Malta and Lithuania, and twelve points in the televote from Armenia, Luxembourg, Denmark, Israel, Belgium, Australia, the United Kingdom, Lithuania, Austria and the Rest of the World. Over the course of the contest, Bulgaria awarded its 12 points to Albania (televote) and Malta (jury) in the second semi-final, and to Greece (televote) and Malta (jury) in the final.

BNT appointed Vladimira Ilieva as its spokesperson to announce the Bulgarian jury's votes in the final.

==== Points awarded to Bulgaria ====
Points awarded to Bulgaria (Semi-final 2)
Score	Televote	Jury
12 points	Albania; Austria; Cyprus; France; Luxembourg; Malta; Rest of the World; Switzerland; United Kingdom	Denmark
10 points	Armenia; Azerbaijan; Denmark; Norway; Romania	Australia; Malta
8 points	Australia; Czechia	Armenia; Cyprus
7 points		
6 points	Latvia	Albania; France; Norway
5 points		Latvia; Luxembourg; United Kingdom
4 points	Ukraine	Azerbaijan
3 points		Romania; Switzerland
2 points		Austria
1 point		Czechia

Points awarded to Bulgaria (Final)
Score	Televote	Jury
12 points	Armenia; Australia; Austria; Belgium; Denmark; Israel; Lithuania; Luxembourg; Rest of the World; United Kingdom	Australia; Denmark; Lithuania; Malta
10 points	Azerbaijan; Cyprus; Czechia; Germany; Greece; San Marino; Serbia	Armenia; Cyprus; Poland; United Kingdom
8 points	Malta; Norway; Romania; Sweden; Switzerland	Israel; Luxembourg; San Marino
7 points	Croatia; Estonia; Finland; France; Latvia; Montenegro; Poland	Estonia; France; Germany; Moldova; Serbia
6 points	Albania; Georgia; Moldova; Portugal	Greece
5 points	Italy	Azerbaijan; Montenegro; Sweden
4 points	Ukraine	Belgium; Croatia; Czechia; Latvia; Romania; Switzerland
3 points		Albania; Georgia; Italy; Norway
2 points		
1 point		

==== Points awarded by Bulgaria ====
Points awarded by Bulgaria (Semi-final 2)
Score	Televote	Jury
12 points	Albania	Malta
10 points	Cyprus	Cyprus
8 points	Romania	Australia
7 points	Malta	Norway
6 points	Norway	Denmark
5 points	Armenia	Ukraine
4 points	Ukraine	Armenia
3 points	Australia	Albania
2 points	Luxembourg	Azerbaijan
1 point	Denmark	Switzerland

Points awarded by Bulgaria (Final)
Points	Televote	Jury
12 points	Greece	Malta
10 points	Romania	Cyprus
8 points	Albania	Australia
7 points	Ukraine	Israel
6 points	Cyprus	Italy
5 points	Israel	Moldova
4 points	Croatia	Czechia
3 points	Moldova	Norway
2 points	Malta	Germany
1 point	Italy	Denmark

==== Detailed voting results ====
Each participating broadcaster assembles a seven-member jury panel consisting of music industry professionals who are citizens of the country they represent and two of which have to be between 18 and 25 years old. Each jury, and individual jury member, is required to meet a strict set of criteria regarding professional background, as well as diversity in gender and age. No member of a national jury was permitted to be related in any way to any of the competing acts in such a way that they cannot vote impartially and independently. The individual rankings of each jury member as well as the nation's televoting results were released shortly after the grand final.

The following members comprised the Bulgarian jury:

- Kostadin Todorov Filipov
- Krasimir Nikolov Gyulmezov
- Stefan Mihaylov Dimitrov
- Joanna Nickolova Dragneva – represented Bulgaria in the Eurovision Song Contest 2008 as part of the Deep Zone Project
- Krisiya Marinova Todorova – represented Bulgaria in the Junior Eurovision Song Contest 2014 alongside Hasan & Ibrahim
- Maria Ilieva Mutafchieva
- Valeria Valerieva Voykova

Detailed voting results from Bulgaria (Semi-final 2)
R/O	Country	Jury									Televote	
R/O	Country	Juror A	Juror B	Juror C	Juror D	Juror E	Juror F	Juror G	Rank	Points	Rank	Points
01	Bulgaria											
02	Azerbaijan	10	6	12	3	14	5	13	9	2	14	
03	Romania	7	9	13	7	10	9	6	12		3	8
04	Luxembourg	9	13	14	14	12	8	12	14		9	2
05	Czechia	4	11	6	13	11	13	5	11		12	
06	Armenia	8	7	3	10	5	11	10	7	4	6	5
07	Switzerland	12	8	7	9	3	7	14	10	1	11	
08	Cyprus	13	2	2	2	4	1	2	2	10	2	10
09	Latvia	14	14	9	4	9	12	11	13		13	
10	Denmark	11	4	5	5	8	6	9	5	6	10	1
11	Australia	1	10	4	6	2	4	4	3	8	8	3
12	Ukraine	3	3	11	12	7	14	8	6	5	7	4
13	Albania	5	12	8	11	13	3	7	8	3	1	12
14	Malta	2	1	1	1	1	2	1	1	12	4	7
15	Norway	6	5	10	8	6	10	3	4	7	5	6

Detailed voting results from Bulgaria (Final)
R/O	Country	Jury									Televote	
R/O	Country	Juror A	Juror B	Juror C	Juror D	Juror E	Juror F	Juror G	Rank	Points	Rank	Points
01	Denmark	10	9	14	6	6	9	10	10	1	16	
02	Germany	16	6	16	7	7	4	19	9	2	19	
03	Israel	4	5	4	5	5	11	11	4	7	6	5
04	Belgium	19	17	22	22	16	13	21	20		23	
05	Albania	7	15	7	23	11	6	14	12		3	8
06	Greece	17	16	15	10	9	7	18	16		1	12
07	Ukraine	3	14	13	21	19	22	15	15		4	7
08	Australia	1	7	8	8	1	5	5	3	8	13	
09	Serbia	23	18	23	17	17	21	17	22		11	
10	Malta	5	1	1	1	2	1	1	1	12	9	2
11	Czechia	2	8	3	19	23	17	8	7	4	20	
12	Bulgaria											
13	Croatia	20	23	21	18	22	24	22	24		7	4
14	United Kingdom	24	12	24	11	12	20	16	18		21	
15	France	11	13	12	4	13	15	6	11		12	
16	Moldova	14	4	2	12	15	8	2	6	5	8	3
17	Finland	13	19	11	3	21	18	12	14		14	
18	Poland	8	11	9	16	20	10	7	13		17	
19	Lithuania	15	24	18	24	24	23	24	23		24	
20	Sweden	22	22	17	13	18	19	23	21		18	
21	Cyprus	12	2	5	2	3	3	3	2	10	5	6
22	Italy	18	3	19	14	4	2	4	5	6	10	1
23	Norway	6	10	6	9	8	12	9	8	3	15	
24	Romania	9	20	10	15	14	16	13	17		2	10
25	Austria	21	21	20	20	10	14	20	19		22	
