= X Factor (Bulgarian TV series) season 5 =

X Factor
- Season 5
- Hosted by: Aleksandra Raeva; Maria Ignatova
- Judges: Lubo Kirov; Krisko; Sanya Armutlieva; Zaki; Hilda Kazasyan (guest)
- Winner: 4 Magic
- Winning mentor: Lubo Kirov
- Runner-up: Yoana Dimitrova

Release
- Original network: NOVA
- Original release: 10 September – 17 December 2017

X Factor is a Bulgarian television music competition to find new singing talent and part of a British franchise The X Factor. The fifth and final season began on 10 September 2017 and concluded on 17 December 2017. The judging panel consisted of Kristian Talev - Krisko, Sanya Armutlieva, Lubo Kirov and Velizar Sokolov - Zaki. Aleksandra Raeva and Maria Ignatova returned as presenters of the main show on NOVA. The winner of competition received 50 000 leva and a contract with a record company.

== Judges and hosts ==
Judges for X Factor season five

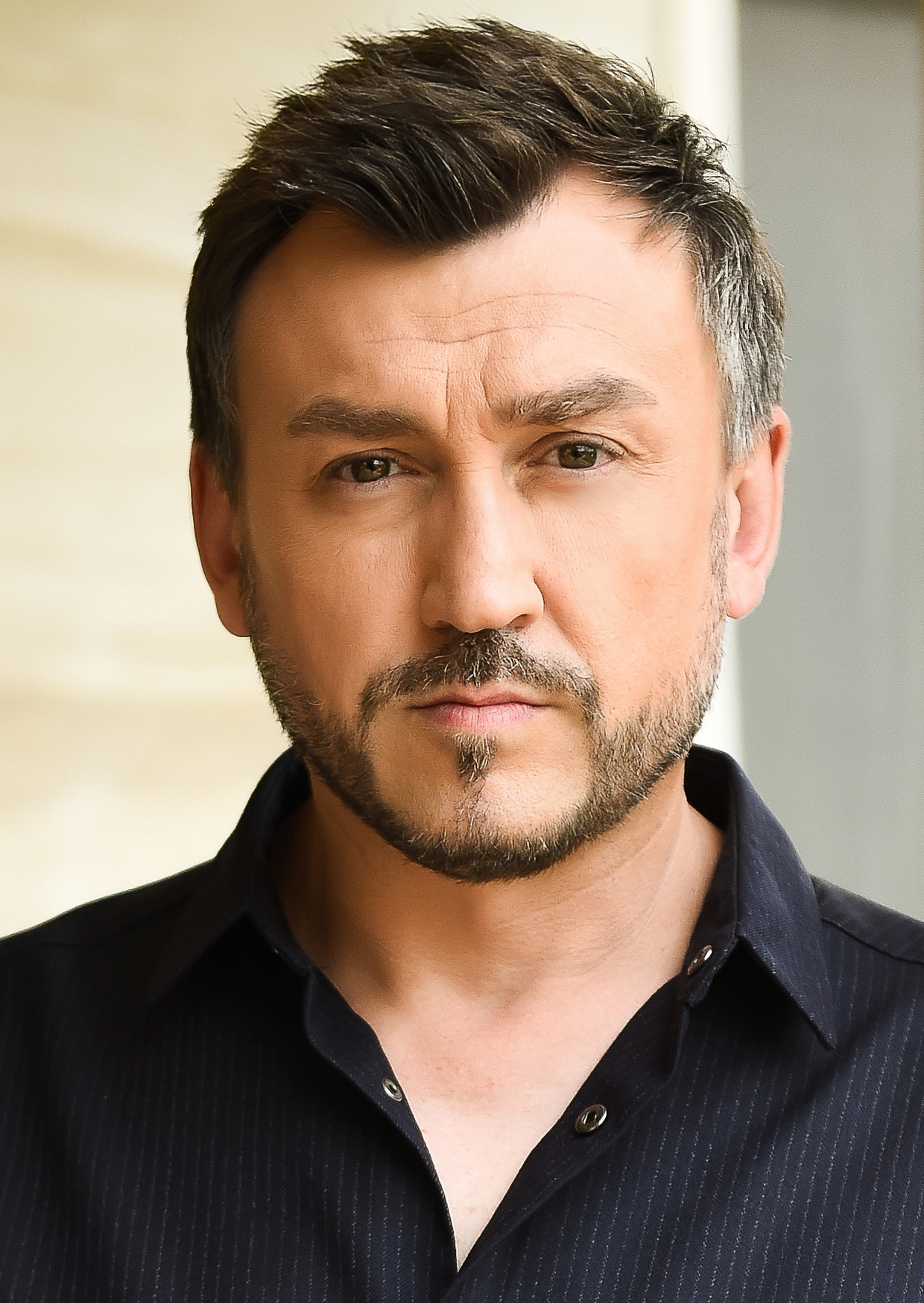
Lubo Kirov

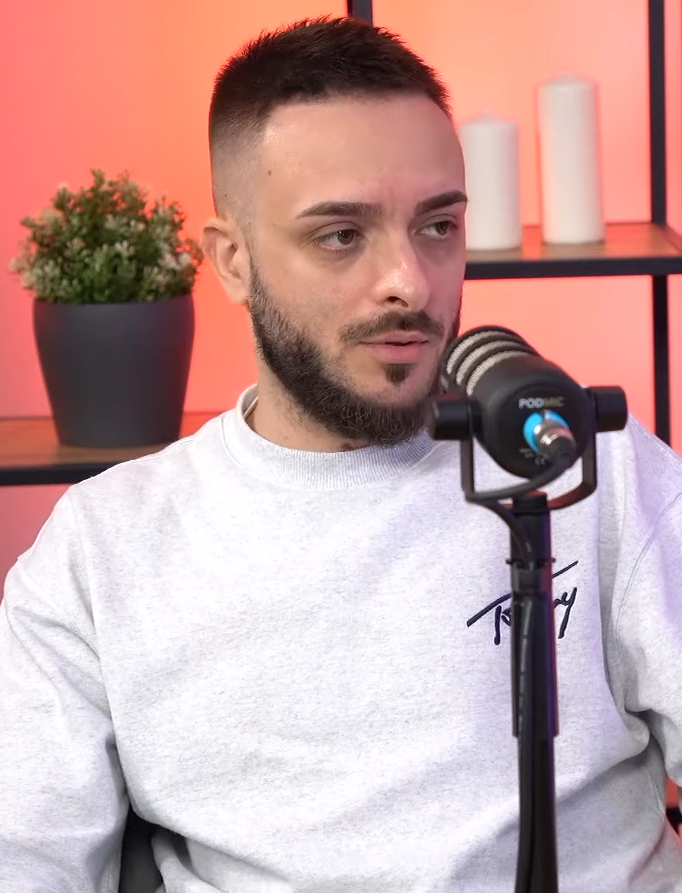
Krisko

Sanya Armutlieva

Zaki

On May 22, 2017, NOVA announced the return of the musical competition show. The hosts Aleksandra Raeva and Maria Ignatova returned for their fourth season. Of the four judges of the previous seasons, only Krisko and Sanya Armutlieva returned for their second and fourth season respectively. They were joined by seasons 2 and 3 judges Lubo Kirov and Zaki, who returned after a one season hiatus.

== Selection process ==
=== Auditions ===
The minimum age to audition for this season was 14. Contestants needed three or more 'yeses' from the four judges to progress to Bootcamp.

Summary of judges' auditions
Episode	Airing date	Judges			
1	September 10, 2017	Lubo Kirov	Krisko	Sanya Armutlieva	Zaki
2	September 17, 2017	Lubo Kirov	Krisko	Sanya Armutlieva	Zaki
3	September 24, 2017	Lubo Kirov	Krisko	Sanya Armutlieva	Zaki
4	October 1, 2017	Lubo Kirov	Krisko	Hilda Kazasyan	Zaki

=== Bootcamp ===
More than 100 contestants made it to the Bootcamp, where they had two tasks. Task 1 had them singing in groups, of which the judges chose the best. About 50 acts continued to Task 2, which was The Six-Chair challenge. It was then revealed that Kirov would mentor the Groupes, Krisko – the Boys, Armutlieva – the Girls and Zaki – the Over 25s. From there, in each category only 6 contestants made it to the Judges' houses.

=== Judges' houses ===
Summary of judges' houses
Judge	Category	Assistants	Contestants eliminated
Kirov	Groups	Miro	Aleksandar, David & Denis; Stefani, Simon & Radostina; Hristina, Presiyana & Viktoria
Zaki	Over 25s	Maria Ilieva	Nikolay Nikolov; Tsveta Dobreva; Valeri Wilson
Krisko	Boys	Yordanka Hristova	Emil Petrov; Mario Arangelovski; Pavel Mateev
Armutlieva	Girls	Louisa Johnson	Nikoleta Stanoykova; Stanislava Vasileva

== Finalists ==
Key:

– Winner
– Runner-up
– Third Place

Category (mentor)	Acts			
Boys (Krisko)	Ivan Dimitrov	Stoyancho Buchkov	Teodor Stoyanov	
Girls (Armutlieva)	Eva Parmakova	Milena Tsanova	Miroslava Todorova	Yoana Dimitrova
Over 25s (Zaki)	Dahmara	Manal El-Feitury	Virginia Subeva	
Groups (Kirov)	4 Magic	Mario and Viktoria	Treasures	

== Live shows ==
The live shows began on 22 October 2017, with the performance shows taking place every Sunday along with the results show on the same day. The live shows will be filmed at Global Group Studio in Sofia and will conclude on 17 December 2017. The thirteen finalists were revealed on 15 October 2017 immediately after the last judges' houses episode.

=== Musical guests ===
Krisko with Pavell & Venci Venc' performed on the third live show, while DARA performed on the fourth live show. Nevena Peykova performed on the fifth live show, while Mihaela Fileva and Slavin Slavchev along with Julian's Laughter will perform on the sixth live show. Mihaela Marinova performed on the seventh live show, while TITA will perform on the eighth live show.

=== Results summary ===
Colour key

–	Contestant was in the bottom two/three and had to perform again in the sing-off
–	Contestant was in the bottom three but received the fewest votes and was immediately eliminated
–	Contestant received the fewest public votes and was immediately eliminated (no sing-off)
–	Contestant received the most public votes

Weekly results per contestant
Contestant	Week 1	Week 2	Week 3	Week 4	Week 5	Week 6	Week 7	Week 8	Week 9 Final	
Contestant	Week 1	Week 2	Week 3	Week 4	Week 5	Week 6	Week 7	Week 8	Round One	Round Two
4 Magic	Safe	Safe	Safe	Safe	Safe	Bottom two	Safe	Safe	Safe	Winner; 54%
Yoana Dimitrova	Safe	Safe	Safe	Safe	Safe	Safe	Safe	Bottom three	Safe	Runner-up; 46%
Eva Parmakova	Safe	Safe	Safe	Safe	Safe	Safe	Bottom two	Safe	3rd	Eliminated (week 9)
Miroslava Todorova	Safe	Safe	Safe	Safe	7th	Safe	Safe	Bottom three	Eliminated (week 8)	
Milena Tsanova	Safe	Safe	Safe	Safe	Safe	Safe	Safe	Bottom three	Eliminated (week 8)	
Mario and Viktoria	Safe	Safe	Bottom two	Safe	Safe	Safe	Bottom two	Eliminated (week 7)		
Virginia Sabeva	Safe	Safe	Safe	Bottom two	Safe	Bottom two	Eliminated (week 6)			
Teodor Stoyanov	Safe	Safe	Safe	Safe	8th	Eliminated (week 5)				
Ivan Dimitrov	Safe	Safe	Safe	Bottom two	Eliminated (week 4)					
Treasures	Safe	10th	Bottom two	Eliminated (week 3)						
Manal El-Feitury	Bottom three	11th	Eliminated (week 2)							
Stoyancho Buchkov	Bottom three	Eliminated (week 1)								
Dahmara	13th	Eliminated (week 1)								
Final showdown	Manal El-Feitury	Treasures	Mario and Viktoria	Virginia Subeva	Miroslava Todorova	4 Magic	Eva Parmakova	No bottom two/judges' vote; public votes alone decide who is eliminated		
Final showdown	Stoyancho Buchkov	Manal El-Feitury	Treasures	Ivan Dimitrov	Teodor Stoyanov	Virginia Subeva	Mario and Viktoria	No bottom two/judges' vote; public votes alone decide who is eliminated		
Judges voted to	Save							No bottom two/judges' vote; public votes alone decide who is eliminated		
Krisko's vote	Stoyancho Buchkov	Manal El-Feitury	Mario and Viktoria	Ivan Dimitrov	Teodor Stoyanov	4 Magic	Eva Parmakova	No bottom two/judges' vote; public votes alone decide who is eliminated		
Armutlieva's vote	Manal El-Feitury	Treasures	Mario and Viktoria	Virginia Subeva	Miroslava Todorova	4 Magic	Eva Parmakova	No bottom two/judges' vote; public votes alone decide who is eliminated		
Zaki's vote	Manal El-Feitury	Manal El-Feitury	Mario and Viktoria	Virginia Subeva	Miroslava Todorova	Virginia Subeva	Eva Parmakova	No bottom two/judges' vote; public votes alone decide who is eliminated		
Kirov's vote	Manal El-Feitury	Treasures	N/A	Virginia Subeva	Teodor Stoyanov	4 Magic	Mario and Viktoria	No bottom two/judges' vote; public votes alone decide who is eliminated		
Eliminated	Dahmara; Fewest votes to save	Manal El-Feitury; 2 of 4 votes Deadlock	Treasures; 0 of 3 votes Minority	Ivan Dimitrov; 1 of 4 votes Minority	Teodor Stoyanov; 2 of 4 votes Deadlock	Virginia Subeva; 1 of 4 votes Minority	Mario and Viktoria; 1 of 4 votes Minority	Miroslava Todorova; Fewest votes to save	Eva Parmakova; Fewest votes (out of 3)	4 Magic; 54% to win
Eliminated	Stoyancho Buchkov; 3 of 4 votes Majority	Manal El-Feitury; 2 of 4 votes Deadlock	Treasures; 0 of 3 votes Minority	Ivan Dimitrov; 1 of 4 votes Minority	Teodor Stoyanov; 2 of 4 votes Deadlock	Virginia Subeva; 1 of 4 votes Minority	Mario and Viktoria; 1 of 4 votes Minority	Milena Tsanova; Fewest votes to save	Eva Parmakova; Fewest votes (out of 3)	Yoana Dimitrova; 46% (out of 2)
Reference(s)										

Notes

- ^{1} Lubo Kirov was not required to vote as there was already a majority.

Summary of live shows
Live Show	Airing date	Judges			
Week 1	October 22, 2017	Lubo Kirov	Krisko	Sanya Armutlieva	Zaki
Week 2	October 29, 2017	Lubo Kirov	Krisko	Sanya Armutlieva	Zaki
Week 3	November 5, 2017	Lubo Kirov	Krisko	Sanya Armutlieva	Zaki
Week 4	November 12, 2017	Lubo Kirov	Krisko	Sanya Armutlieva	Zaki
Week 5	November 19, 2017	Lubo Kirov	Krisko	Sanya Armutlieva	Zaki
Week 6	November 26, 2017	Lubo Kirov	Hilda Kazasyan	Sanya Armutlieva	Zaki
Week 7	December 3, 2017	Lubo Kirov	Krisko	Sanya Armutlieva	Zaki
Week 8	December 10, 2017	Lubo Kirov	Krisko	Sanya Armutlieva	Zaki
Week 9 Final	December 17, 2017	Lubo Kirov	Krisko	Sanya Armutlieva	Zaki

=== Live show details ===
==== Week 1 (22 October) ====
- Theme: "Express yourself" (songs to showcase who they are)

Contestants' performances on the first live show
Act	Order	Song	Result
Yoana Dimitrova	1	"Crazy in Love"	Saved
Virginia Subeva	2	"Get Away"	Saved
Treasures	3	"Can't Stop the Feeling!"	Saved
Teodor Stoyanov	4	"Shape Of My Heart"	Saved
Eva Parmakova	5	"That's My Girl"	Saved
Dahmara	6	"Beat It"	Eliminated
Ivan Dimitrov	7	"One and Only"	Saved
Mario and Viktoria	8	"Vivo per lei"	Saved
Manal El-Feitury	9	"Side to Side"	Bottom three
Milena Tsanova	10	"Nothing Compares 2U"	Saved
4 Magic	11	"How Deep Is Your Love"	Saved
Stoyancho Buchkov	12	"Somebody To Love"	Bottom three
Miroslava Todorova	13	"Can't Take My Eyes Off You"	Saved
Final showdown details
Stoyancho Buchkov	1	"Hear Me"	Eliminated
Manal El-Feitury	2	"When I Was Your Man"	Saved

This week's results show featured a double elimination. The three acts with the fewest votes were announced as the bottom three and the act with the fewest public votes was then automatically eliminated. The remaining two acts then performed in the final showdown for the judges' votes.

==== Week 2 (29 October) ====
- Theme: "Halloween Night"

Contestants' performances on the second live show
Act	Order	Song	Result
Teodor Stoyanov	1	"Human"	Saved
Mario & Viktoria	2	"Beauty and the Beast"	Saved
Manal El-Feitury	3	"The Monster"	Bottom two
Miroslava Todorova	4	"Creep"	Saved
Treasures	5	"I'm In Love With a Monster"	Bottom two
Eva Parmakova	6	"Alive"	Saved
4 Magic	7	"Bad Romance"	Saved
Ivan Dimitrov	8	"Whataya Want from Me"	Saved
Milena Tsanova	9	"Just Like Fire"	Saved
Yoana Dimitrova	10	"You Win or You Die"	Saved
Virginia Subeva	11	"Sweet Dreams (Are Made of This)"	Saved
Final showdown details
Manal El-Feitury	1	"Strong Enough"	Eliminated
Treasures	2	"Хубава си, моя горо"	Saved

==== Week 3 (5 November) ====
- Theme: "Bulgarian Hits"
- Musical guests: Krisko feat. Pavell & Venci Venc' ("Герой")

Contestants' performances on the third live show
Act	Order	Song	Result
Eva Parmakova	1	"Не ти ли стига"	Saved
4 Magic	2	"Уморени крила"	Saved
Miroslava Todorova	3	"Прошепнати мечти"	Saved
Mario and Viktoria	4	"Завинаги"	Bottom two
Treasures	5	"If Love Was A Crime"	Bottom two
Virginia Subeva	6	"Искам те"	Saved
Ivan Dimitrov	7	"Знам"	Saved
Yoana Dimitrova	8	"Черната овца"	Saved
Milena Tsanova	9	"Вървят ли двама"	Saved
Teodor Stoyanov	10	"Бягство"	Saved
Final showdown details
Mario & Victoria	1	"Say Something"	Saved
Treasures	2	"Little Me"	Eliminated

==== Week 4 (12 November) ====
- Theme: "Love Songs"
- Musical guests: DARA ("Недей")

Contestants' performances on the fourth live show
Act	Order	Song	Result
Virginia Subeva	1	"Stone Cold"	Bottom two
Teodor Stoyanov	2	"Angie"	Saved
Yoana Dimitrova	3	"Hurts"	Saved
Mario and Victoria	4	"Without You"	Saved
Milena Tsanova	5	"Wish You Were Here"	Saved
Miroslava Todorova	6	"All of Me"	Saved
4 Magic	7	"Flashlight"	Saved
Ivan Dimitrov	8	"One"	Bottom two
Eva Parmakova	9	"Make You Feel My Love"	Saved
Final showdown details
Ivan Dimitrov	1	"Breathe Easy"	Eliminated
Virginia Subeva	2	"Son of a Preacher Man"	Saved

==== Week 5 (19 November) ====
- Theme: "Movie Night"
- Musical guests: Nevena Peykova ("Трябваш ми спешно")

Contestants' performances on the fifth live show
Act	Order	Song	Result
4 Magic	1	"One Night Only"	Saved
Miroslava Todorova	2	"Somewhere Over The Rainbow"	Bottom two
Mario & Viktoria	3	"(I've Had) The Time of My Life"	Saved
Eva Parmakova	4	"River Deep, Mountain High"	Saved
Milena Tsanova	5	"I See Fire"	Saved
Virginia Subeva	6	"Listen"	Saved
Yoana Dimitrova	7	"Оставаме"	Saved
Teodor Stoyanov	8	"I'll Be There For You"	Bottom two
Final showdown details
Teodor Stoyanov	1	"Сбогом, моя любов"	Eliminated
Miroslava Todorova	2	"Lovesong"	Saved

==== Week 6 (26 November) ====
- Theme: "Party Night"
- Musical guests:
  - Mihaela Fileva ("Последни думи")
  - Slavin Slavchev and Julian's Laughter ("Lost")

Contestants' performances on the sixth live show
Act	Order	Song	Result
Yoana Dimitrova	1	"Mamma Knows Best"	Saved
4 Magic	2	"Chained to the Rhythm"	Bottom two
Virginia Subeva	3	"Uptown Funk"	Bottom two
Eva Parmakova	4	"Ex's & Oh's"	Saved
Miroslava Todorova	5	"Sway"	Saved
Mario & Viktoria	6	"La Tortura"	Saved
Milena Tsanova	7	"Don't Let Me Down"	Saved
Final showdown details
Virginia Subeva	1	"Proud Mary"	Eliminated
4 Magic	2	"Who's Lovin' You"	Saved

==== Week 7 (3 December) ====
- Theme: "Evergreen Songs and Duets"
- Musical guests: Mihaela Marinova ("Листата падат"), ("Един срещу друг")

Contestants' performances on the seventh live show
Act	Order	Song	Result
First song (Individual performance)
Eva Parmakova	1	"Ain't No Other Man"	Bottom two
Mario & Viktoria	2	"Cose Della Vita"	Bottom two
Miroslava Todorova	3	"Imagine"	Saved
Milena Tsanova	4	"The Show Must Go On"	Saved
4 Magic	5	"Man in the Mirror"	Saved
Yoana Dimitrova	6	"Think"	Saved
Second song (Duet)
Mario & Viktoria	1	"If I Ain't Got You"	N/A
Milena Tsanova	1	"If I Ain't Got You"	N/A
Eva Parmakova	2	"When You Believe"	N/A
Yoana Dimitrova	2	"When You Believe"	N/A
4 Magic	3	"I Will Survive" / "Survivor"	N/A
Miroslava Todorova	3	"I Will Survive" / "Survivor"	N/A
Final showdown details
Eva Parmakova	1	"And I Am Telling You I'm Not Going"	Saved
Mario & Viktoria	2	"Broken Strings"	Eliminated

==== Week 8: Semi-final (10 December) ====
- Theme: Bulgaria vs. The Rest of the World
- Musical guests: TITA ("Антилопа")

Contestants' performances on the eighth live show
Act	Order	First song	Order	Second song	Result
Milena Tsanova	1	"Истина"	10	"Nobody's Perfect"	Bottom three
Miroslava Todorova	2	"Недей"	6	"Writing's on the Wall"	Bottom three
Yoana Dimitrova	3	"Once Upon a December"	8	"Играя стилно"	Bottom three
Eva Parmakova	4	"И аз съм тук"	7	"Russian Roulette"	Saved
4 Magic	5	"Зайди, зайди"	9	"Love the Way You Lie"	Saved
Final showdown details
Milena Tsanova	1	"It's a Man's World"			Eliminated
Yoana Dimitrova	2	"I Care"			Saved
Miroslava Todorova	3	"Fallin'"			Eliminated

This week's results show featured a double elimination. The three acts with the fewest votes were announced as the bottom three and will perform in the final showdown then the public decide who they want to save.

==== Week 9: Final (17 December) ====
- Musical guests: Christiana Louizu, Kristian Kostov, Margarita Hranova, Mihaela Marinova

Contestants' performances on the ninth live show
Act	Order	First song (Individual performance)	Order	Second song (Duet)	Result
Round One
Eva Parmakova	1	"Make You Feel My Love"	4	"My Kind Of Love" (with Mihaela Marinova)	Eliminated
4 Magic	2	"Вечерай, Радо"	5	"Feeling Good" (with Christiana Louizu)	Saved
Yoana Dimitrova	3	"Think"	6	"Болката отляво" (with Kristian Kostov)	Saved
Round Two
4 Magic	1	"Set Fire to the Rain"			Winner
Yoana Dimitrova	2	"All by Myself"			Runner-up

== Episodes ==
Ep. #	Episode	Airdate
1	Auditions 1	September 10
2	Auditions 2	September 17
3	Auditions 3	September 24
4	Auditions 4	October 1
5	Bootcamp & Six-Chair challenge	October 8
6	Judges' Houses (Top 24)	October 15
7	Live Show 1 (Top 13)	October 22
8	Live Show 2 (Top 11)	October 29
9	Live Show 3 (Top 10)	November 5
10	Live Show 4 (Top 9)	November 12
11	Live Show 5 (Top 8)	November 19
12	Live Show 6 (Top 7)	November 26
13	Live Show 7 (Top 6)	December 3
14	Live Show 8 (Top 5)	December 10
15	Final (Top 3)	December 17
