= Dara Ekimova =

Bulgarian pop singer (born 2002)

- Ekimova being interviewed in 2025

Background information
- Born: Dara Dmitrova Ekimova; June 25, 2002 (age 24); Bulgaria
- Genre: Pop
- Occupations: Singer; Songwriter
- Instrument: Vocals
- Years active: 2012–present
- Label: Virginia Records

Dara Dmitrova Ekimova (born 25 June 2002), is a Bulgarian singer.

== Early life ==
As a child, Ekimova took a poetry writing course at UNESCO. She studied acting, pop and jazz dancing and folk dancing. She also studies Spanish, Russian and English. Dara studied solfeggio, piano and folk dances at the Bulgarian Chokolo. Her parents are Iva Ekimova and Dimitar Ekimov, her father died when she was six years old. She performed in Bulgarian children's musical group Bonbon. In 2012, she collaborated with Ivaylo Kolev. In 2014, Ekimova appeared at X-Factor castings, however was unable to participate in the show due to age restrictions. In 2015, she participated in the Bulgarian national final for Junior Eurovision in Sofia.

== Career ==
In 2019, Ekimova collaborated with Iskrata on the single "Sagapao". The electronic music magazine 10-те най named it as a "10 most favorite Bulgarian hits of 2019". The following year, she released a tribute to her late father, titled "Za Teb".

In 2021, she released a single titled "Voina", one of the most played Bulgarian songs nationwide during that year according to Prophon.

She signed a deal with Virginia Records in 2022, and in the same year, she released a duet with singer Tino.

In 2023, Ekimova released the first single "Disham" on her debut album with producer Cristian Pistol. She received two awards in the BG awards ceremony, th BG Radio award and the BG Song Award for "Disham". In the same year, she participated in New Years performances in Pomorie.

She released a collaboration with Bulgarian singer Mihaela Fileva titled "Vsichko E Bilo Za Dobro" in 2024. In the same year, she released her debut album Tazi Staja, and was given the "Woman of the Year" award by Grazia magazine.

Ekimova participated in Natsionalna Selektsiya Za Evroviziya 2026, Bulgaria's artist selection for the Eurovision Song Contest 2026, where she performed her song "Disham", but didn't make it to the final. Following Natsionalna Selektsiya, she released the singles "Brok Zvedi" and "Digitalno". The music video for "Brok Zvedi" was premiered on April 20 at the Andromeda Planetarium in Sofia. She also released her LP Setiva in the same year.

== Discography ==
=== Albums ===
- Setiva (2026)
- Tazi Staja (2024)

=== Singles ===
- "Sagapao" (2019)
- "Za Teb" (2020)
- "Voina" (2021)
- "Disham" (2023)
- "Vsichko E Bilo Za Dobro" (2024)
- "Brok Zvedi" (2026)
- "Digitalno" (2026)
