= Atanas Kolev (rapper) =

Bulgarian rapper

- Also known as: Nasko Kolev
- Born: Atanas Kolev; Varna, Bulgaria
- Genre: R&B
- Occupation: Rapper
- Instrument: Vocals
- Years active: 2013–present
- Labels: Virginia Records, Facing The Sun

Atanas Kolev (Bulgarian: Атанас Колев), better known by his stage name Nasko, is a Bulgarian singer and basketball player from the Bulgarian city of Varna. He was a finalist in X Factor Bulgaria in 2013.

== Biography ==
Atanas was born in Varna, Bulgaria. He started training basketball at the age of 15 in BC Cherno More. He studied at the High School of Mathematics "Dr. Petar Beron", Varna.

In 2013, he participated in X Factor where he finished as a runner-up. A typical way he starts his songs is with "Lay down on the floor" repeated twice followed by "Nasko e chuek". In 2018, he participated in VIP Brother Bulgaria which he won and finished in 1st place.

The X Factor performances and results
| Episode | Theme | Song | Result |
|---|---|---|---|
| First audition | Free choice | "Molly" | Through to bootcamp |
| Bootcamp – stage 1 | Group performance | "" | Through to stage 2 |
| Bootcamp – stage 2 | Solo performance | "" | Through to judges' houses |
| Judges' houses | Free choice | "I Need a Dollar" | Through to live shows |
| Live show 1 | Heroes | "In da Club" | Safe |
| Live show 2 | Bulgarian hits | "Знаеш ли кой видях" | Safe |
| Live show 3 | Dance and R&B hits | "Boyfriend" | Safe |
| Live show 4 | Number-ones | "SexyBack" | Safe |
| Live show 5 | Halloween | "Jump Around" | Safe |
| Live show 6 | Concert optional | "Thrift Shop" | Safe |
| Live show 7 | British hits | "Let It Be/Molly" | Safe |
| Live show 8 | Love songs | "Hero" | Safe |
| Live show 9 | Movie Soundtracks | "Come with Me" | Safe |
| Live show 10 | Love is everything | "Ideal Petroff" | Safe |
| Live show 10 | Love is everything | "Love the Way You Lie" (with Nelina Georgieva) | Safe |
| Semi-final | One English and one Bulgarian song | "Lolly" | Bottom two (3rd) |
| Semi-final | One English and one Bulgarian song | "Светът е за двама" | Bottom two (3rd) |
| Semi-final | Final showdown | "" | Bottom two (3rd) |
| Final | One solo and one duet song | "Molly" | Runner-up |
| Final | One solo and one duet song | "Empire State of Mind" (with Maria Ilieva) | Runner-up |
| Final | Songs of the series | "Lose Yourself" | Runner-up |

== Discography ==
List of singles as main artist
| Title | Year | Peak chart positions | | | | | | Album |
| Title | Year | BUL | US | CAN | IRE | NZ | UK | Album |
|---|---|---|---|---|---|---|---|---|
| Шах и мат | 2014 | — | — | — | — | — | — | —N/a |
| По-добре | 2015 | — | — | — | — | — | — | —N/a |
"—" denotes a recording that did not chart or was not released in that territory.

List of singles as featuring artist
| Title | Year | Peak chart positions | | | | | | Album |
| Title | Year | BUL | US | CAN | IRE | NZ | UK | Album |
|---|---|---|---|---|---|---|---|---|
| Зиг Заг (Deep Zone Project featuring Atanas Kolev) | 2014 | — | — | — | — | — | — | —N/a |
| Така да е (Maria Ilieva featuring Atanas Kolev | 2015 | — | — | — | — | — | — | —N/a |
| В твоя чест (Santra featuring Atanas Kolev) | 2016 | — | — | — | — | — | — | —N/a |
| Обещавам | 2016 | — | — | — | — | — | — | —N/a |
"—" denotes a recording that did not chart or was not released in that territory.
