= Gery-Nikol =

Bulgarian singer, model, dancer, and producer

Gery-Nikol Гери-Никол
- Born: Gery-Nikol Nikolaeva Georgieva; 30 July 1998 (age 27); Varna, Bulgaria
- Genres: Pop; Hip hop; R&B
- Occupations: Singer; songwriter
- Instrument: Vocals
- Years active: 2014–present
- Labels: G-N Music; Facing The Sun
- Formerly of: Sweet 16
- Website: gerynikol.com

Gery-Nikol Nikolaeva Georgieva (Bulgarian: Гери-Никол Николаева Георгиева, born 30 July 1998), better known mononymously as Gery-Nikol, is a Bulgarian recording artist who rose to fame in late 2014 after participating in the third season of the singing competition X Factor Bulgaria.

== Career ==
Gery-Nikol was born on July 30, 1998, in Varna, Bulgaria.

In 2014, she auditioned in the Bulgarian version of the reality show The X Factor as part of the Sweet 16 girl band alongside Hristina Hristova and Mishel Straminski. During the show they received mentorship by Bulgarian rapper Krisko. They left the competition after being eliminated in the seventh live show.

In 2015, a few months after her departure from The X Factor, Gery-Nikol signed a record deal with the Bulgarian-German label Facing The Sun. She began her solo career shortly, following the release of her debut single "Ela I Si Vzemi" ("Come and Get It") featuring her former X Factor Bulgaria mentor Krisko. The song quickly peaked the Bulgarian charts during the summer of 2015 and enjoyed successful commercial performance throughout the rest of the year. In late 2015 she revealed her second single "Momiche Kato Men" ("Girl Like Me"), supported by a music video. Both videos of the two singles were watched by a record number of viewers on the VBOX7 and YouTube video platforms.

In 2016, her impact was followed-up by the songs "I'm The Queen" on April 3 and "Gotina & Luda" on December 20 ("Cool and Crazy"). Both singles were also accompanied with two English versions directed towards an international audience, the second of which was renamed specifically to "One of a Kind" for the upcoming target group.

On July 20, 2017, Gery-Nikol premiered her fifth overall single "Naprao Gi Ubivam", which features fellow Varna-based rapper 100 Kila.

== Discography ==
Gery-Nikol discography
- Singles: 22
- Music videos: 10

=== Singles ===
==== As lead artist ====
Title	Year	Peak chart positions	Album
Title	Year	BUL	Album
"Ela i si vzemi" (featuring Krisko)	2015	1	Non-album singles
"Momiche kato men"	2015	5	Non-album singles
"I'm the Queen" (Bulgarian version)	2016	13	Non-album singles
"I'm the Queen" (English version)	2016	—	Non-album singles
"Gotina & luda"	2016	—	Non-album singles
"One of a Kind"	2017	—	Non-album singles
"Naprao gi ubivam" (featuring 100 Kila)	2017	6	Non-album singles
"Nad zakona"	2018	—	Non-album singles
"Ustni"	2018	—	Non-album singles
"Shefe, shefe" (featuring Bandata Na Ruba)	2019	—	Non-album singles
"Drujte se mujki" (featuring 100 Kila)	2019	—	Non-album singles
"Gledai me" (featuring Slatkaristika)	2020	—	Non-album singles
"Butay"	2021	—	Non-album singles
"Bitcoin"	2022	—	Non-album singles
"Telefona" (with Leo)	2022	—	Non-album singles
"Molya te"	2023	—	Non-album singles
"Taki Bum Bum" (with VessoU)	2023	—	Non-album singles
"Zodiya psiho"	2023	—	Non-album singles
"Pusni Location"	2024	—	Non-album singles
"Biznes" (with Mikhail)	2024	—	Non-album singles
"Sestri po salzi" (with Atija featuring Toni Storaro)	2025	—	Non-album singles
"Eleganten simulant" (with Bilyanish)	2025	—	Non-album singles
"Prestiž" (with Ivana Boom Nikolić)	2026	—	2000s
"—" denotes a recording that did not chart or was not released in that territory.

=== Music videos ===
Year	Title	Director	Artist(s)
As main performer
2015	"Ela i si vzemi"	Valeri Milev	featuring Krisko
2015	"Momiche kato men"	Valeri Milev	
2016	"I'm the Queen"	Nikolay Nankov	Bulgarian and English versions
2016	"Gotina & luda"	Aleksandar Mollov	
2017	"One of a Kind"	Aleksandar Mollov	
2017	"Naprao gi ubivam"	Georgi Markov	featuring 100 Kila
2018	"Nad zakona"	Georgi Markov	
2018	"Ustni"	Viktor Antonov – Rikk	
2019	"Shefe, shefe"	Viktor Antonov – Rikk, Martin Velkov	featuring Bandata Na Ruba
2019	"Drujte se mujki"	Viktor Antonov – Rikk	featuring 100 Kila
2020	"Gledai me"	Georgi Salparov, Simeon Mihalkov	featuring Slatkaristika

== Personal life ==
In 2015 the Bulgarian State Agency for Child Protection lodged a complaint against Gery-Nikol's music video for "Momiche Kato Men" for depicting and promoting obscene content. A few months later, the Bulgarian Council of Electronic Media refused to consider the case due to lack of legal norms.

Gery-Nikol has several times cited Rihanna as her biggest idol and musical influence.
