= Deep Zone Project =

Bulgarian musical group

- Origin: Varna, Bulgaria
- Genres: House/Electro
- Years active: 1998–present
- Labels: Deep Zone Records, Roton
- Members: Dian Savov - DJ Dian Solo; Eva-Maria Petrova; Danny Dimitroff; Lyubomir Savov - JuraTone
- Past members: Rosen Stoev - Rossko; Yoanna Dragneva; Alex Kiprov - Startrax; Julie; Nadezhda Petrova - Nadia; Nelina Georgieva
- Website: www.deepzoneproject.com

Deep Zone Project is a Bulgarian house/electro band formed in 1998 by DJ Dian Solo, JuraTone and Rossko. They are most famous for their collaboration with DJ Balthazar, representing Bulgaria at the Eurovision Song Contest 2008 with the song "DJ, Take Me Away". The band has released five albums and has had a number of successful singles on the Bulgarian charts and has won many national and international awards. Their vocalist until early 2011 was Yoanna Dragneva; after leaving for a solo career, she was replaced by Nadia.

== Formation ==
Deep Zone Project was formed in 1998 by three musicians, DJs and studio engineers. They were DJ Dian Solo (Dian Savov), JuraTone (Lyubomir Savov, Dian's father) and Rossko (Rosen Stoev).

DJ Dian was an accomplished musician who played the piano, saxophone, electric guitar and bass. In 1993, he had started as a DJ and in 1998 was selected "Best DJ of the Year". JuraTone was a multi-instrumentalist born in 1953 who played the flute, banjo, guitar, and had been part of many Bulgarian and European rock formations for 15 years and founder of his own recording studio. For vocals they included Joanna (born 1986, full name Yoanna Dragneva) as a founding member. She used to be in the vocal Bulgarian group Bon-Bon (in Bulgarian Бон-бон) presenting children shows on television and later co-hosting Hello and Melo TV Mania shows.

== Career ==
After the release of their debut album Ela Izgrei in 2002, Deep Zone Project were nominated in five categories at the 2002 MM TV Music Awards. They won the award for "Best Song". In 2003, they won "Best Club Track of the Year" at the MM TV Awards Ceremony for their track "Caffeine-free".

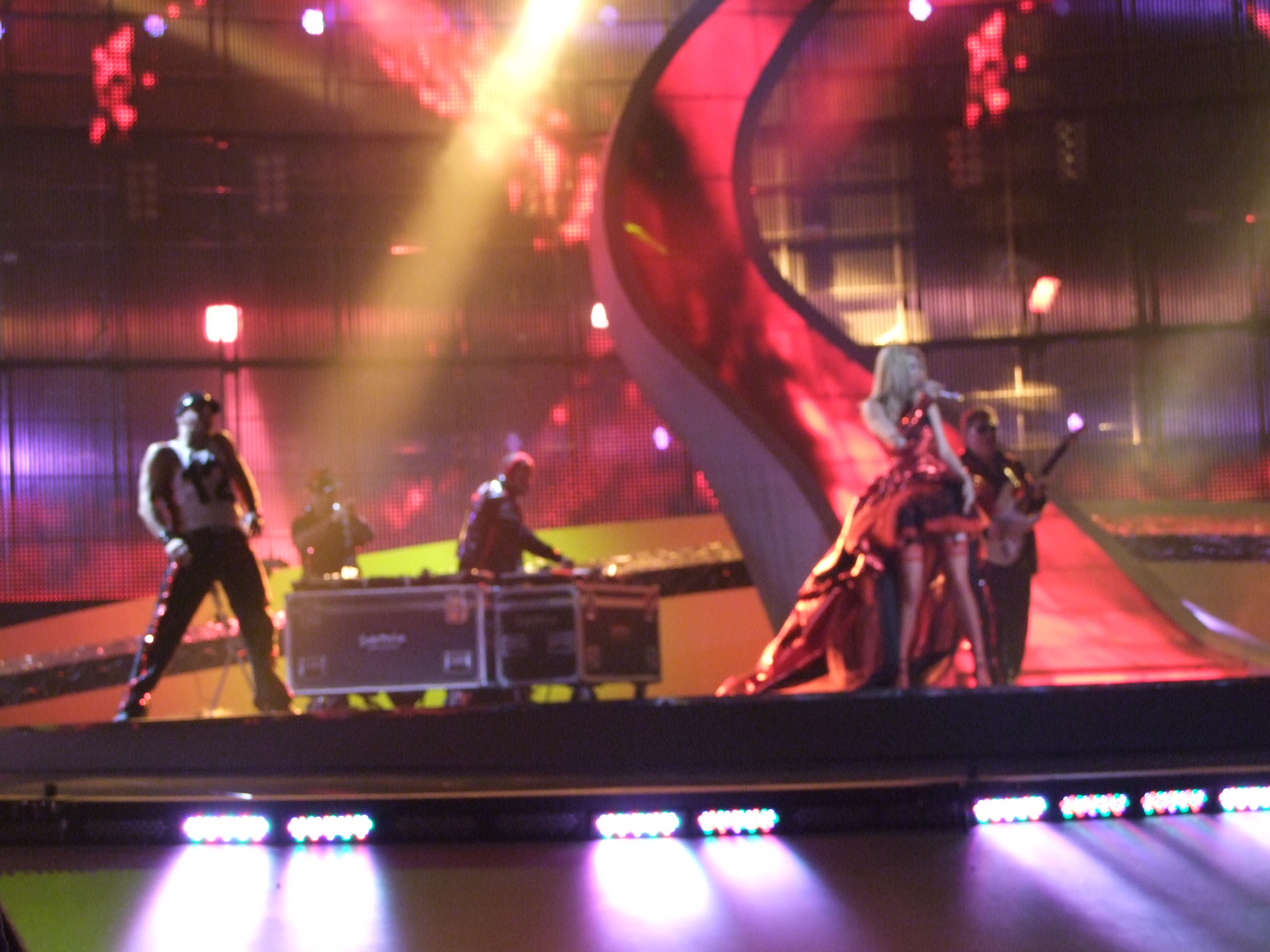
Yoanna performing "DJ, Take Me Away" at the Eurovision Song Contest 2008, Belgrade, 22 May 2008.

Their hit "DJ, Take Me Away" reached the number 2 position at MTV Europe's World Chart Express and won the Bulgarian Eurovision 2008 song contest selection process. At the Eurovision semi-finals, however, the song finished 12th and did not make it to the finals.

The collaboration with DJ Balthazar took the group to another dimension with their national club tours Welcome To The Loop and Red Line (20 dates each), which gathered an audience of nearly 80,000 people.

In 2010, they released "On Fire", a big-budget production in Bulgaria terms with cooperation from actor Fahradin Fahradinov.

In 2011, Joanna left the Deep Zone Project to develop a solo career. She was replaced by vocalist Nadia (full name Nadia Petrova), with recording of "I Love My Dj" as her debut with Deep Zone Project. The song won the 2012 "Bulgarian Best Track of the Year".

In February 2015 it was announced that Alex and Nadia had left the band to develop solo careers.

In 2015, Nelina Georgieva became the vocalist but her contract with the band only lasted for three years. In January 2018, she left the band and she was replaced by Eva Maria Petrova.

== Members ==
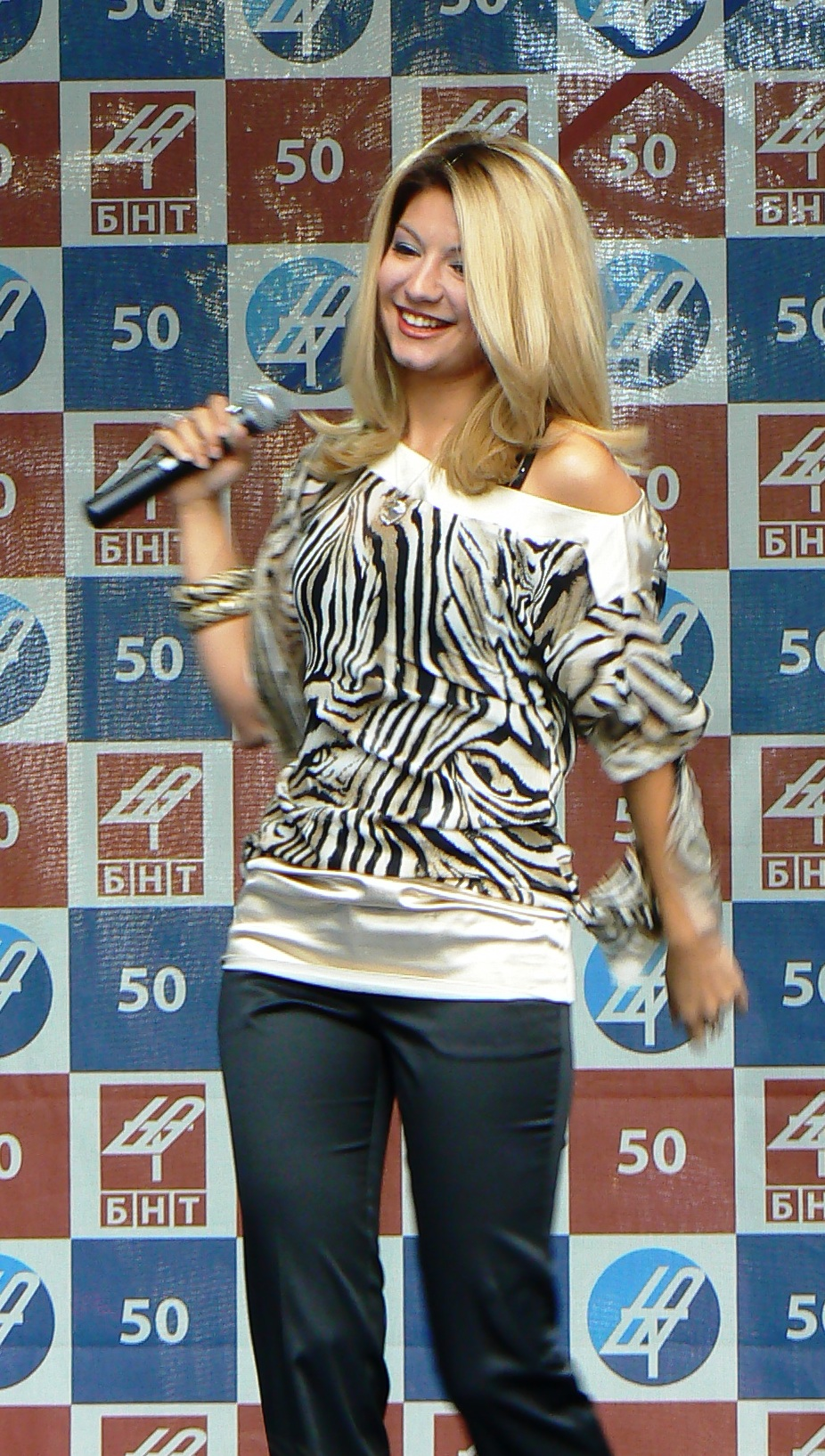
- Joanna Dragneva
  DJ Dian Solo (Dian Savov) — DJ, composer / beat creator, keyboards
- JuraTone (Lyubomir Savov Mikhailov) — guitar, composer / arranger
- Eva-Maria Petrova — vocals (2018-)
- Starlight (Svetlin Kuslev) — saxophonist

Former members

- Rossko (Rosen Stoev) — DJ, sound engineer, Laser Harp
- Julie (Julie) - vocals (2011-2011)
- Joanna (Yoanna Dragneva) — vocals (2008-2011)
- Startrax (Alex Kiprov) — keyboards, studio engineer
- Nadia (Nadezhda Petrova)— vocals (2011-2015)
- Nelina (Nelina Georgieva) - vocals (2015-2018)

== Discography ==
=== Albums ===
- 2002: Ela Izgrei
- 2003: Vlizam v teb
- 2006: Ledeno kafe
- 2008: DJ, Take Me Away
- 2010: Dance Energy
- 2014: Niama NE
- 2015: Maski Dolu

=== Singles ===
Year	Title	Peak	Album
Year	Title	BUL	Album
2007	"Clap Yo Hands"	—	Ledeno Kafe
2007	"Mystika"	—	Ledeno Kafe
2007	"DJ, Take Me Away"	—	DJ, Take Me Away)
2009	"Lyatoto Doyde"	—	DJ, Take Me Away)
2010	"Play"	—	Dance Energy
2012	"I Love My DJ"	20	Nyama NE
2013	"Made For Loving You"	22	Nyama NE
2013	"Nikoy Drug" (Deep Zone featuring Krisko)	4	Nyama NE
2013	"Nyama Ne" (Deep Zone featuring Bobo)	15	Nyama NE
2014	"Vyarvam V Teb" (Deep Zone featuring Boyana)	22	Nyama NE
2014	"Zig Zag" (Deep Zone featuring Atanas Kolev)	—	Nyama NE
2015	"Neka Silata E S Nas"	—	-
2015	"Leten Kadar" (Deep Zone featuring Vessy Boneva)	1	-
2016	"Maski Dolu"	12	Maski Dolu EP
2016	"Magnet"	-	-
2017	"Chista Ludost"	-	
2018	"Say my name" AKA "Ibiza Sound Machine"		
2023	"Punta Cana"	-	-

== Sources ==
Awards and achievements
Preceded by Elitsa Todorova & Stoyan Yankulov with "Water"	Bulgaria in the Eurovision Song Contest; 2008; With: DJ Balthazar	Succeeded by Krassimir Avramov with "Illusion"
