= Bangaranga =

2026 single by Dara

Single by Dara
- Released: 2 March 2026
- Genre: Electro dance; dance-pop; tropical pop
- Length: 2:58
- Lyricists: Darina Yotova; Anne Judith Wik; Cristian Tarcea; Dimitris Kontopoulos
- Producers: Monoir; Dimitris Kontopoulos

Dara singles chronology
| "Curse" (2026) | "Bangaranga" (2026) | "Bad Idea" (2026) |

Music video
- "Bangaranga" on YouTube

Eurovision Song Contest 2026 entry
- Country: Bulgaria
- Artist: Dara
- Language: English

Finals performance
- Semi-final result: 1st
- Semi-final points: 278
- Final result: 1st
- Final points: 516

Entry chronology
- ◄ "Intention" (2022)

Official performance video
- "Bangaranga" (Second Semi-Final) on YouTube "Bangaranga" (Grand Final) on YouTube

"Bangaranga" (Bulgarian: Бангаранга) is a song by Bulgarian singer Dara, released on 2 March 2026 and produced by Monoir and Dimitris Kontopoulos. It represented Bulgaria in the Eurovision Song Contest 2026, winning the contest with 516 points. It was the first entry since 2017 to top both the public and jury votes, and it gave Bulgaria its first victory in the competition. The song reached number one in Austria, Bulgaria, Croatia, Germany, Greece, Israel, Lithuania, Sweden, and Turkey, as well as the top ten in Australia, Finland, Luxembourg, and Switzerland. It also reached number 90 on the Billboard Global 200 chart.

== Background and composition ==
"Bangaranga" was written and composed by Darina 'Dara' Yotova, Anne Judith Wik, Cristian 'Monoir' Tarcea, and Dimitris Kontopoulos; the latter two were responsible for the production. The song is partly inspired by the Bulgarian tradition of Kukeri. Its title is in Jamaican Patois and has been translated as 'a joyful kind of disorder', 'uproar', or 'mischief'. Dara stated that she wrote the lyrics to help her overcome anxiety and attention deficit hyperactivity disorder (ADHD), following her diagnosis with the condition in 2025.

== Music video and promotion ==
Along with the song's release, an accompanying music video directed by K2ID Productions, was released on 18 March 2026 through the Eurovision Song Contest's YouTube channel.

To promote "Bangaranga" ahead of the Eurovision Song Contest 2026, Dara performed at several Eurovision pre‑parties throughout the months of March and April. She appeared at the Nordic Eurovision Party 2026 at Rockefeller in Oslo, Norway, on 21 March 2026, and at the Eurovision Pre‑Party Bucharest 2026 at Arenele Romane in Bucharest, Romania, on 18 April 2026.

== Reception ==
Professional ratings
Review scores
| Source | Rating |
|---|---|
| Dagbladet | 4/5 |
| OndaRock | 4/5 stars |
| The Telegraph | 3/5 stars |
| The Times | 4/5 stars |
| Yle | 5/10 |

Neil McCormick of The Telegraph praised the song's catchiness. Jon O'Brien of Vulture ranked "Bangaranga" seventh among all Eurovision 2026 entries, calling it a "solid return" for Bulgaria. NPR's Glen Weldon placed the song fifth on his top-ten list, while Ed Potton of The Times placed it first in his ranking of the 25 finalists. The song was also included in unranked top-ten lists by Robert van Gijssel and Els de Grefte of de Volkskrant, and by Maria Sherman of the Associated Press.

The song's refrain drew comparisons to "A Little Bit Alexis" from Schitt's Creek, while its verses were likened to "Uninvited" by Alanis Morissette. Mark Savage of the BBC described the song as "brilliantly unhinged and full of sass" while also noting it was "totally lacking in substance".

Following its Eurovision victory, German Chancellor Friedrich Merz played the song to welcome Bulgaria's Rumen Radev during a meeting in Berlin.

== Eurovision Song Contest 2026 ==
=== National selection ===
After qualifying for the second show, Dara was selected as the winning artist by a combination of votes from the public and the judges of the show. On 28 February, for the song selection, she performed three candidate songs; among the three, "Bangaranga" finished first in both the jury vote and the public vote. Dara also stated that she had considered withdrawing from competing at Eurovision owing to the negative comments following her win and speculation that the artist final was rigged.

=== At Eurovision ===
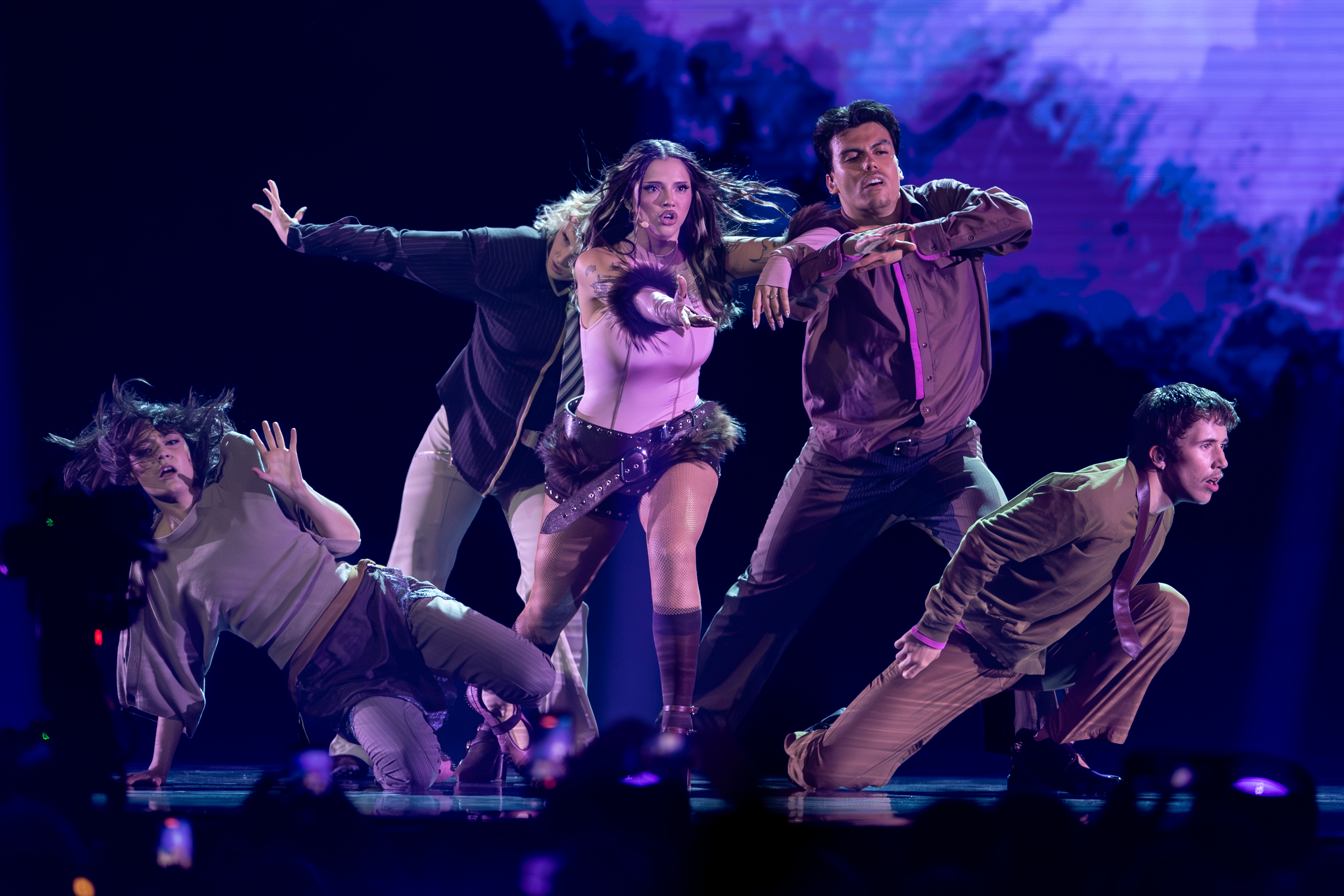
Dara performing "Bangaranga" at the Eurovision Song Contest 2026

The Eurovision Song Contest 2026 took place at the Wiener Stadthalle in Vienna, Austria, and consisted of two semi‑finals (held on 12 and 14 May respectively) and a final on 16 May 2026. During the allocation draw held on 12 January 2026, Bulgaria was drawn to compete in the second semi‑final and was allocated to the first half of the show. Dara was later drawn to open the semi‑final. Dara's performance was choreographed by Fredrik Rydman and Keisha von Arnold, and she was backed by dancers Iker Cederblom Herrera, Ellinea Siambalis, Lisa Högström, and Mateo Cordova Pomo. She qualified for the grand final, having won the second semi‑final with 278 points.

In the final, Dara won with 516 points, securing victory in both the jury vote and the public vote, which gave Bulgaria its first win in the history of the Eurovision Song Contest.

== Track listing ==
- Digital download / streaming
1. "Bangaranga" – 2:57
- Digital download / streaming
1. "Bangaranga" (Eurovision) – 2:58
- Digital download / streaming
1. "Bangaranga" (Jax Jones remix) – 2:40

== Charts ==
=== Weekly charts ===
Weekly chart performance
| Chart (2026) | Peak position |
|---|---|
| Australia Digital (ARIA) | 7 |
| Austria (Ö3 Austria Top 40) | 1 |
| Belgium (Ultratop 50 Flanders) | 39 |
| Bulgaria Airplay (PROPHON) | 1 |
| Bulgaria Domestic Airplay (PROPHON) | 1 |
| CIS Airplay (TopHit) | 120 |
| Croatia (Billboard) | 3 |
| Croatia International Airplay (Top lista) | 1 |
| Czech Republic Singles Digital (ČNS IFPI) | 46 |
| Denmark (Tracklisten) | 12 |
| Estonia Airplay (TopHit) | 107 |
| Finland (Suomen virallinen lista) | 14 |
| Germany (GfK) | 1 |
| Germany Dance (GfK) | 1 |
| Global 200 (Billboard) | 90 |
| Greece International (IFPI) | 1 |
| Iceland (Billboard) | 13 |
| Ireland (IRMA) | 53 |
| Israel (Mako Hitlist) | 42 |
| Israel International Airplay (Media Forest) | 1 |
| Italy (FIMI) | 53 |
| Latvia Streaming (LaIPA) | 2 |
| Lithuania (AGATA) | 1 |
| Luxembourg (Billboard) | 2 |
| Moldova Airplay (TopHit) | 59 |
| Netherlands (Tipparade) | 13 |
| Netherlands (Single Top 100) | 52 |
| New Zealand Hot Singles (RMNZ) | 26 |
| Norway (VG-lista) | 14 |
| Poland Streaming (OLiS) | 23 |
| Romania (Billboard) | 13 |
| Slovakia Airplay (ČNS IFPI) | 33 |
| Slovakia Singles Digital (ČNS IFPI) | 93 |
| Sweden (Sverigetopplistan) | 1 |
| Switzerland (Schweizer Hitparade) | 2 |
| Turkey International Airplay (Radiomonitor Türkiye) | 1 |
| Ukraine Airplay (TopHit) | 35 |
| UK Singles (Official Charts) | 21 |
| UK Dance (Official Charts) | 3 |
| UK Indie (Official Charts) | 3 |
| US Dance Digital Song Sales (Billboard) | 13 |

=== Monthly charts ===
Monthly chart performance
| Chart (2026) | Peak position |
|---|---|
| Lithuania Airplay (TopHit) | 20 |
| Ukraine Airplay (TopHit) | 50 |

== Certifications ==
Certifications for "Bangaranga"
| Region | Certification | Certified units/sales |
|---|---|---|
| Greece (IFPI Greece) | Platinum | 2,000,000^{†} |
^{†} Streaming-only figures based on certification alone.

== Awards and nominations ==
| Year | Award | Category | Nominee(s) | Result | Ref. |
|---|---|---|---|---|---|
| 2026 | Marcel Bezençon Awards | Artistic Award | "Bangaranga" | Won | |

| Preceded by "Wasted Love" by JJ | Eurovision Song Contest winners 2026 | Succeeded by TBA |
