= Nelina Georgieva =

- Born: Nelina Lyudmilova Georgieva; April 8, 1997 (age 29); Kazanlak, Bulgaria
- Genres: R&B, pop, soul, jazz
- Occupation: Singer
- Instruments: Vocals, piano
- Years active: 2013–present
- Labels: Deep Zone Records, Roton
- Website: deepzoneproject.com

Nelina Georgieva (Bulgarian: Нелина Георгиева, born 8 April 1997) is a Bulgarian pop singer from the Bulgarian city of Kazanlak. She was the lead vocal of Deep Zone Project from 2015 until early 2018.

== Biography ==
=== Early career ===
Nelina was born in Kazanlak, Bulgaria. Her father, Lyudmil is a musician and her mother, Sonya, is a hairdresser. She has an older brother. Georgieva studies in Music School "Lyubomir Pipkov" in Sofia. She started singing at the age of 4 and has been playing piano since the age of 5. When she was 7 she became Mini Miss Rose Queen.

Georgieva was part of the second season of X Factor. She left the show in week 11 on 5th place.

The X Factor performances and results
| Episode | Theme | Song | Result |
|---|---|---|---|
| First audition | Free choice | "I Wanna Dance with Somebody (Who Loves Me)" | Through to bootcamp |
| Bootcamp – stage 1 | Group performance | "" | Through to stage 2 |
| Bootcamp – stage 2 | Solo performance | "" | Through to judges' houses |
| Judges' houses | Free choice | "I Love My DJ" | Through to live shows |
| Live show 1 | Heroes | "The Power of Love" | Safe |
| Live show 2 | Bulgarian hits | "Играя стилно" | Safe |
| Live show 3 | Dance and R&B hits | "When Love Takes Over" | Safe |
| Live show 4 | Number-ones | "Hurt" | Safe |
| Live show 5 | Halloween | "La La La" | Bottom two (10th) |
| Live show 5 | Final showdown | "I Will Always Love You" | Bottom two (10th) |
| Live show 6 | Concert optional | "Hush Hush; Hush Hush" | Safe |
| Live show 7 | British hits | "Nobody's Perfect" | Safe |
| Live show 8 | Love songs | "Un-Break My Heart" | Safe |
| Live show 9 | Movie Soundtracks | "Skyfall" | Safe |
| Live show 10 | Love is everything | "Titanium" | Bottom two (5th) |
| Live show 10 | Love is everything | "In Love with Ivo" (with Ivelin Dimov) | Bottom two (5th) |
| Live show 10 | Final showdown | "I Surrender" | Bottom two (5th) |
| Semi-final | One English and one Bulgarian song | "Bad Romance" | Left in the show (5th) |
| Semi-final | One English and one Bulgarian song | "За тебе бях" | Left in the show (5th) |
| Semi-final | Final showdown | "Camino" | Left in the show (5th) |

=== Deep Zone Project ===
On 14 March 2015 it was announced that Nelina join the Bulgarian house/electro band Deep Zone Project as a lead vocals. Her contract with Deep Zone Project only lasted for three years. In January 2018, she announced that she left the band to focus on her solo career.

=== Solo career ===
After leaving Deep Zone Project, Nelina started to focus on her solo career. Her debut single as a solo singer, "Deja Vu", was released on her YouTube channel on June 28, 2018. Her second single, "Рай" was released on April 25, 2019. on her YouTube channel.

== Discography ==
List of singles with Deep Zone
| Title | Year | Peak chart positions | | | | | | Album |
| Title | Year | BUL | US | CAN | IRE | NZ | UK | Album |
|---|---|---|---|---|---|---|---|---|
| May the Force be With You | 2015 | 22 | — | — | — | — | — | —N/a |
| Летен кадър (feat. Vessy Boneva) | 2015 | 1 | — | — | — | — | — | —N/a |
| Маски долу | 2015 | 34 | — | — | — | — | — | —N/a |
"—" denotes a recording that did not chart or was not released in that territory.

List of Singles as a Solo Artist
| Title | Year | Album |
|---|---|---|
| Deja Vu | 2018 | N/A |
| Рай | 2019 | N/A |
