= Dara (Bulgarian singer) =

Bulgarian singer (born 1998)

Dara Дара
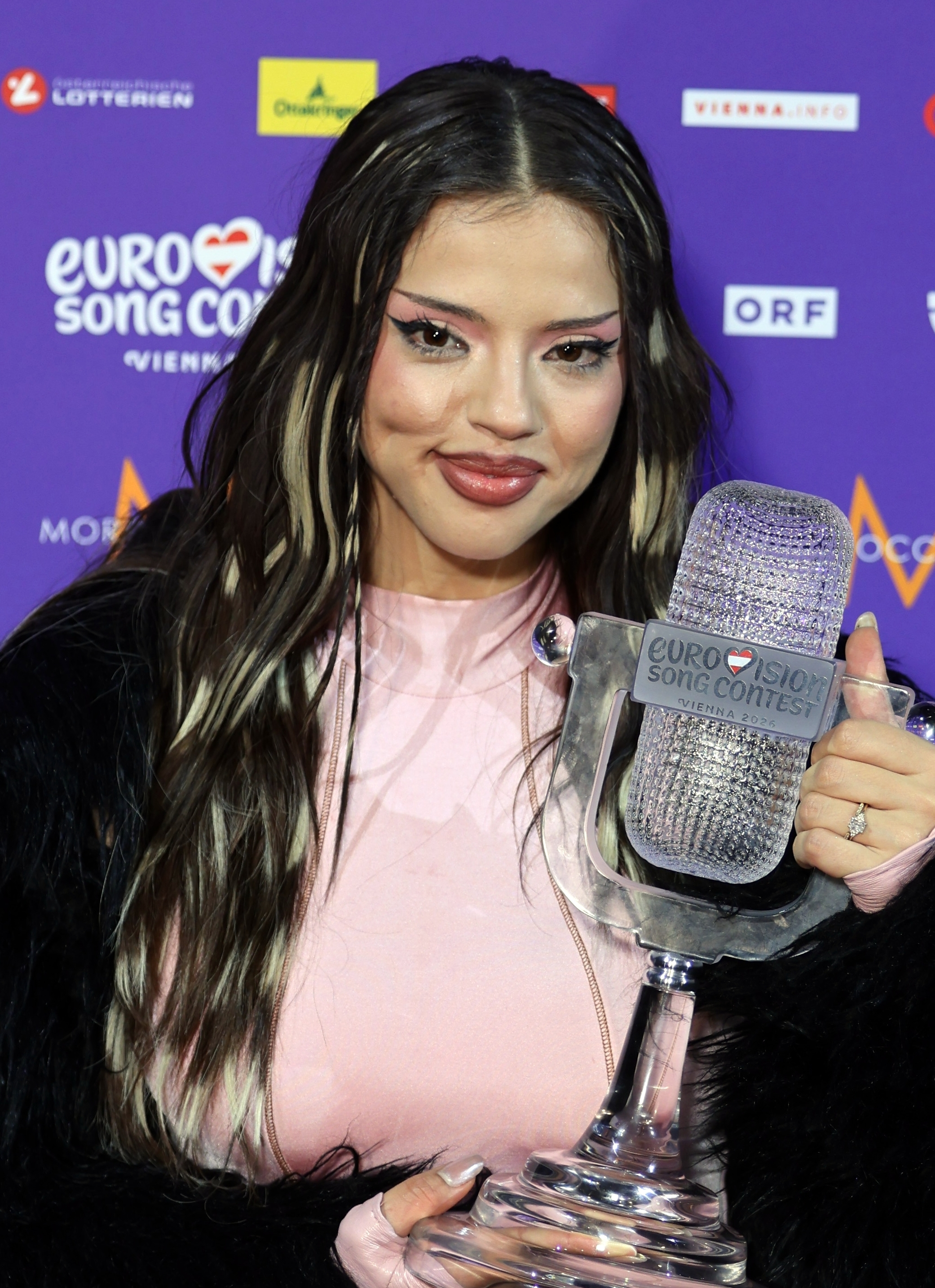
- Dara following her victory at the Eurovision Song Contest 2026

Background information
- Born: Darina Nikolaeva Yotova; 9 September 1998 (age 28); Varna, Bulgaria
- Genres: Pop; R&B; synth-pop
- Occupations: Singer; songwriter
- Years active: 2015–present
- Label: Virginia Records (2016–2026)
- Spouse: Ervin Ivanov (m. 2025)
- Website: thisisdara.com

Darina Nikolaeva Yotova (Bulgarian: Дарина Николаева Йотова; born 9 September 1998), professionally known as Dara (Дара; stylised in all caps), is a Bulgarian singer and songwriter. She first rose to prominence in 2015 after reaching the final in the Bulgarian edition of The X Factor. In 2016, she released her debut single "K'vo ne chu", and in 2022, she released her first studio album, Rodena takava under Virginia Records. In 2026, she won the Eurovision Song Contest for Bulgaria with the song "Bangaranga", giving her country its first ever win in the competition since the country's debut in 2005. The song won both the jury vote and televote in the contest.

== Early life and education ==
She graduated from the Dobri Hristov National School of Arts in Varna, where she studied folk singing using traditional Bulgarian vocal techniques.

== Career ==
=== 2015–2019: The X Factor and early career ===
In 2015, Yotova took part in the Bulgarian edition of the reality series The X Factor, in which she finished third, with the Bulgarian rapper Krisko as her mentor.

Following her departure from The X Factor, Yotova signed a record deal with the Bulgarian music label Virginia Records and adopted the stage name Dara. In the summer of 2016, she released her debut single, "K'vo ne chu", accompanied by a music video. A few weeks later, the single reached the top of the Bulgarian charts, and an English-language version of the song, titled "Onto You", was released on 29 September for an international audience.

On 12 March 2017, Dara released her second single "Rodena takava", also accompanied by a music video. A few months later, on 21 July, she made her first guest appearance on a single named "Nyama da si tragnesh s drug" by labelmates Plamen & Ivo alongside Bulgarian hip-hop duo Pavell and Venci Venc'. On 29 September, Dara's third single "Nedei" was released on YouTube with an official music video.

On 20 June 2018, Dara released her fourth single "Vse na men", along with a music video.

=== 2020–2024: The Voice of Bulgaria and debut album Rodena takava ===
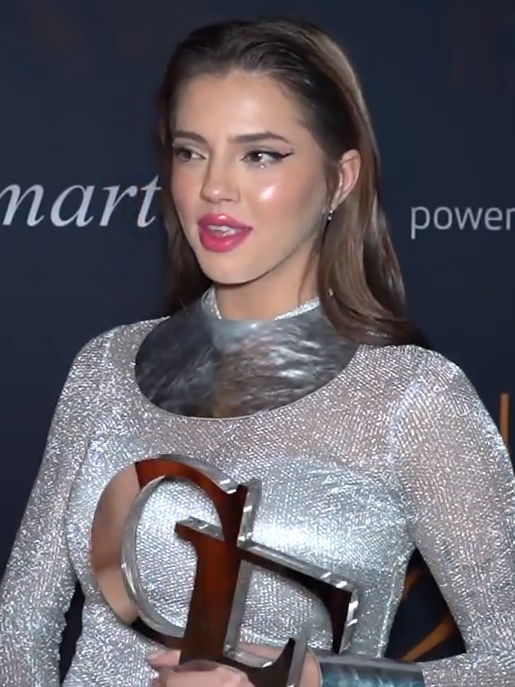
Dara at the Code Fashion Awards in 2022

In early 2020, Dara starred in the TV show Kato dve kapki voda, the Bulgarian version of Your Face Sounds Familiar, finishing in third place in the final. Since 2021, Dara has been a coach on The Voice of Bulgaria. In 2022, on the ninth season, Jacklyn Tarrakci, a member of Team Dara, won the competition. This made Dara the winning coach. In 2024, during the eleventh season, Dara's artist, Slaveya Ivanova, won the competition, marking Dara's second win in four seasons as a coach.

In March 2022, Dara won the Fashion Teen Idol award at the Code Fashion Awards, as voted by the event's teen audience. In April of the same year, she released her debut album, Rodena takava, accompanied by a live performance at Joy Station Sofia.

In March 2023, Kai released "Rover", a remake of Dara's original "Mr. Rover", on his solo album Rover.

In the spring of 2024, she participated in the fifth season of Dancing Stars, where she finished as the runner-up.

=== 2025–present: ADHDara and Eurovision win ===
On 19 September 2025, Dara released her second studio album ADHDara.

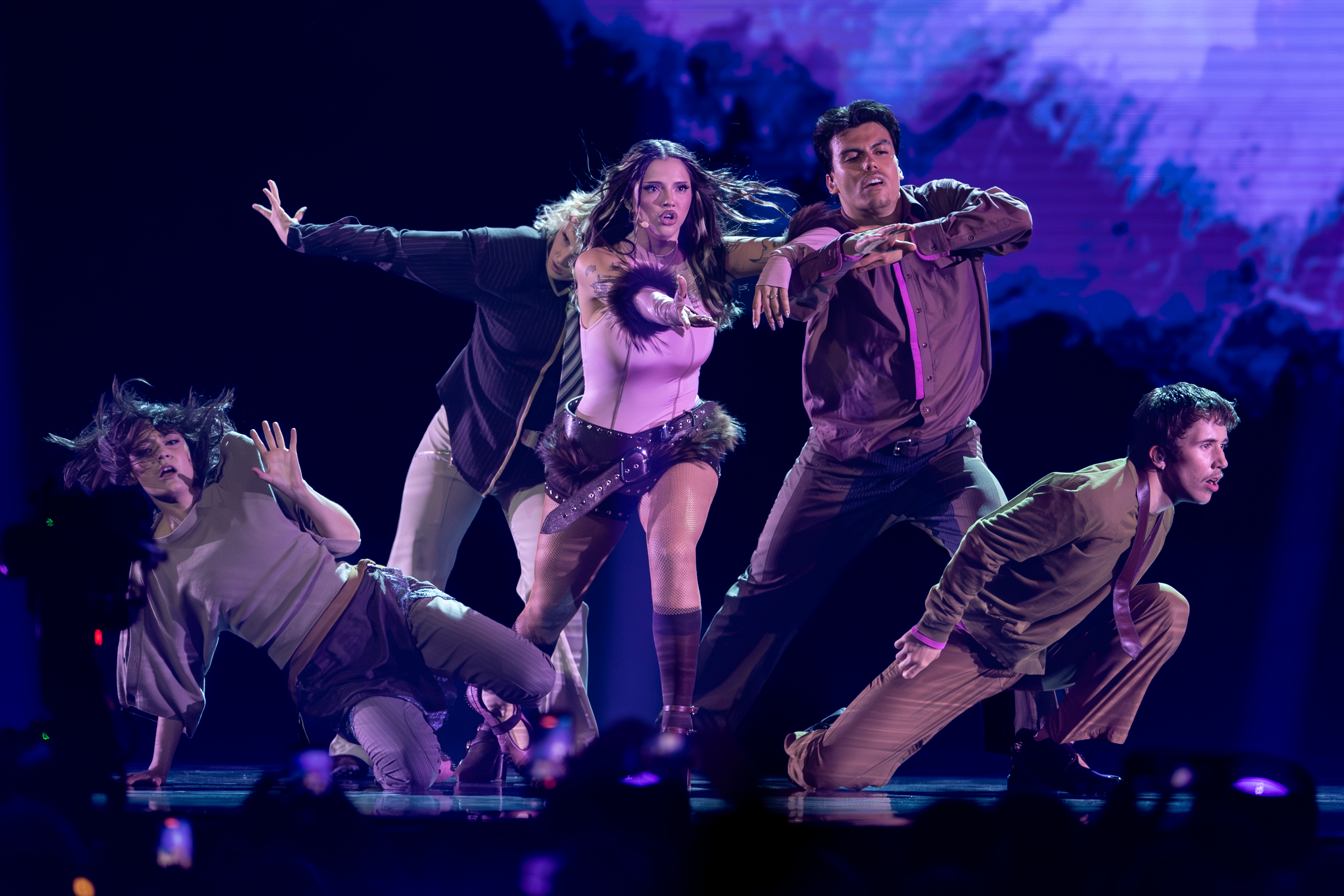
Dara at dress rehearsal for Eurovision 2026 semi-final 2 in Vienna

In early 2026 Dara participated in the Bulgarian national selection for the Eurovision Song Contest. After winning the second show on 31 January 2026, she was selected to represent Bulgaria at the contest in Vienna. The song with which she competed in Vienna, "Bangaranga", was selected on 28 February 2026. Dara won the second semi-final and then went on to win the contest, scoring 516 points Her victory marked Bulgaria's first win in the contest. She also won the Marcel Bezençon Award for the Best Artistic Performance category, voted by the participating commentators. Her 173 point margin of victory over 2nd place is the highest margin ever recorded in the history of the contest. She was also the first artist since 2017 to win both the jury and audience votes. As of October 2026, the song has surpassed 60 million streams on Spotify.

In July 2026, Dara and her husband, Ervin Zaimov, established StarShe Global DPK, a music production and artist management company, with Dara holding a 90% ownership stake. On 1 September 2026, she announced her departure from Virginia Records after ten years with the label.

On 30 October 2026, Dara released "Bad Idea," the single from her upcoming English-language album, scheduled for release in 2027. The song was released through her own label, StarShe Global, and digitally distributed by Orpheus Music and Warner Music. That same day, she performed a sold-out concert in Sofia, Bulgaria.

== Personal life ==
In 2025, Dara was diagnosed with attention deficit hyperactivity disorder (ADHD).

Since 2022, Dara has been in a relationship with doctor Ervin Ivanov. The couple made their first public appearance together that same year, and in February 2024 they announced their engagement during a trip to Thailand. They were married in June 2025 in a private ceremony in Bulgaria.

In her interviews, Dara has stated that she is a fan of the Greek multi-sports club, Olympiacos.

== Discography ==
Dara discography
- Studio albums: 2
- Singles: 31
- Music videos: 29

=== Studio albums ===
| Title | Details |
|---|---|
| Rodena takava | Released: 25 March 2022; Label: Virginia; Formats: Digital download, streaming |
| ADHDara | Released: 19 September 2025; Label: Virginia; Formats: Digital download, streaming |

=== Singles ===
==== As lead artist ====
| Title | Year | Peak chart positions | | | | | | | | | | Album |
| Title | Year | BUL Air. | BUL Dom. Air. | AUT | FIN | GER | LTU | SWE | SWI | UK | WW | Album |
|---|---|---|---|---|---|---|---|---|---|---|---|---|
| "K'vo ne chu" | 2016 | — | 6 | — | — | — | * | — | — | — | — | Rodena takava |
| "Rodena takava" | 2017 | — | 1 | — | — | — | * | — | — | — | — | Rodena takava |
| "Nedei" | 2017 | 7 | 1 | — | — | — | * | — | — | — | — | Rodena takava |
| "Vse na men" | 2018 | 9 | 2 | — | — | — | * | — | — | — | — | Rodena takava |
| "BTW (Bye Bye)" (with Livin R & Noisy) | 2019 | — | 3 | — | — | — | — | — | — | — | — | Rodena takava |
| "Sosa maje" (with Virgo) | 2019 | — | — | — | — | — | — | — | — | — | — | Rodena takava |
| "Darbie" | 2019 | 7 | 1 | — | — | — | — | — | — | — | — | Rodena takava |
| "Hotel 5 zvezdi" (with Pavell & Venci Venc') | 2019 | — | — | — | — | — | — | — | — | — | — | Upgrade |
| "Ella Ella" | 2019 | 6 | 2 | — | — | — | — | — | — | — | — | Rodena takava |
| "Ai Ai"/"Fire" | 2020 | 3 | 1 | — | — | — | — | — | — | — | — | Rodena takava |
| "Mamacita" | 2020 | — | — | — | — | — | — | — | — | — | — | Rodena takava |
| "Cold as Ice" | 2021 | 5 | 2 | — | — | — | — | — | — | — | — | Rodena takava |
| "Thunder" | 2021 | 1 | 1 | — | — | — | — | — | — | — | — | Rodena takava |
| "Call Me" (with Matteo) | 2022 | — | 1 | — | — | — | — | — | — | — | — | Rodena takava |
| "Mr. Rover" | 2022 | — | 4 | — | — | — | — | — | — | — | — | Non-album singles |
| "Veche nyama kak" (with Lubo Kirov) | 2023 | 10 | 1 | — | — | — | — | — | — | — | — | Tseluni me |
| "Boginya" | 2023 | — | 3 | — | — | — | — | — | — | — | — | Non-album singles |
| "In My Head" | 2023 | 6 | 1 | — | — | — | — | — | — | — | — | Non-album singles |
| "Zaminavam" | 2023 | — | 1 | — | — | — | — | — | — | — | — | Non-album singles |
| "Nyama da mi lipsvash" (with Bobo) | 2023 | 10 | 2 | — | — | — | — | — | — | — | — | Non-album singles |
| "Samo moi" | 2024 | — | 2 | — | — | — | — | — | — | — | — | Non-album singles |
| "Zmiya" (with Venci Venc') | 2024 | — | 3 | — | — | — | — | — | — | — | — | Non-album singles |
| "Kradets na mechti" | 2024 | 8 | 1 | — | — | — | — | — | — | — | — | Non-album singles |
| "Nishto poveche" | 2025 | 9 | 1 | — | — | — | — | — | — | — | — | ADHDara |
| "Barbie & Ken" (with Virgo) | 2025 | — | — | — | — | — | — | — | — | — | — | Sauce Kid 4 |
| "Nito zvuk" | 2025 | 10 | 1 | — | — | — | — | — | — | — | — | ADHDara |
| "Da ne mojem" | 2025 | — | 2 | — | — | — | — | — | — | — | — | ADHDara |
| "Onche bonche" | 2026 | — | 2 | — | — | — | — | — | — | — | — | ADHDara |
| "This Is Me" | 2026 | — | — | — | — | — | — | — | — | — | — | Non-album singles |
| "Curse" | 2026 | — | — | — | — | — | — | — | — | — | — | Non-album singles |
| "Bangaranga" | 2026 | 1 | 1 | 1 | 2 | 1 | 1 | 1 | 2 | 21 | 90 | Non-album singles |
| "Bad Idea" | 2026 | 5 | 1 | — | — | — | — (Note: "Bad Idea" did not enter the AGATA Singlų Top 100, but peaked at number 89 on the TopHit Lithuanian Airplay.) | — | — | — | — | Non-album singles |
"—" denotes a recording that did not chart or was not released in that territory. "*" denotes that the chart did not exist at that time.

==== As featured artist ====
| Title | Year | Peak chart positions | | Album |
| Title | Year | BUL Air. | BUL Dom. Air. | Album |
|---|---|---|---|---|
| "Nyama da si tragnesh s drug" (Plamen & Ivo featuring Dara and Pavell & Venci Venc') | 2017 | — | 3 | Non-album singles |
| "Sreshtu men" (Pavell & Venci Venc' featuring Dara) | 2018 | — | — | Non-album singles |
| "My Time" (Monoir featuring Dara) | 2018 | 4 | 1 | Non-album singles |
| "USK" (Molec featuring Dara) | 2026 | — | 8 | Paraklis |
"—" denotes a recording that did not chart or was not released in that territory.

=== Music videos ===
| Year | Title | Director | Artist(s) |
As main performer
| 2016 | "K'vo ne chu" | Lyusi Ilarionov, Andrey Andreev | |
| 2017 | "Rodena takava" | Lyusi Ilarionov, Georgi Markov | |
| 2026 | "Bangaranga" | K2ID Productions | |
As featured performer
| 2017 | "Nyama da si tragnesh s drug" | Lyusi Ilarionov, Georgi Markov | Plamen & Ivo featuring Dara, Pavell & Venci Venc' |

== Awards and nominations ==
=== BG Radio Music Awards ===
| Year | Nominee(s) | Category | Result | Ref. |
|---|---|---|---|---|
| 2017 | "Kvo ne chu" | Song of the Year | Nominated | |
| 2017 | "Kvo ne chu" (written by Pavel Nikolov and Nikolay "X" Nikolov) | Lyrics of the Year | Nominated | |
| 2017 | Herself | Female Artist of the Year | Nominated | |
| 2017 | Herself | Debut of the Year | Nominated | |
| 2017 | "Kvo ne chu" (directed by Lyusi Ilarionov) | Music Video of the Year | Nominated | |
| 2018 | "Nedei" | Song of the Year | Nominated | |
| 2018 | Herself | Female Artist of the Year | Won | |
| 2018 | "Nedei" (written by herself and Pavel Nikolov) | Lyrics of the Year | Nominated | |
| 2018 | "Nedei" (directed by Lyusi Ilarionov) | Music Video of the Year | Nominated | |
| 2019 | Herself | Female Artist of the Year | Nominated | |
| 2019 | "Vse na men" (directed by Lyusi Ilarionov) | Music Video of the Year | Nominated | |
| 2020 | "Ella Ella" | Song of the Year | Nominated | |
| 2020 | Herself | Female Artist of the Year | Nominated | |
| 2020 | "Darbie" (directed by Viktor Antonov – Rik) | Music Video of the Year | Nominated | |
| 2021 | Herself | Female Artist of the Year | Nominated | |
| 2021 | "Ai Ai" (directed by Emanuil Albert) | Music Video of the Year | Nominated | |
| 2022 | "Thunder" | Song of the Year | Nominated | |
| 2022 | Herself | Female Artist of the Year | Nominated | |
| 2022 | "Thunder" (directed by Stefan Marinov) | Music Video of the Year | Won | |
| 2023 | Herself | Female Artist of the Year | Nominated | |
| 2023 | "Rodena Takava" | Album of the Year | Nominated | |
| 2024 | Herself | Female Artist of the Year | Nominated | |
| 2024 | Herself and Lubo Kirov | Combination of the Year | Nominated | |
| 2025 | Herself | Female Artist of the Year | Won | |

=== Other awards ===
| Award | Year | Nominee(s) | Category | Result | Ref. |
|---|---|---|---|---|---|
| Code Fashion Awards | 2022 | Herself | Fashion Teen Idol | Won | |
| Marcel Bezençon Awards | 2026 | "Bangaranga" | Artistic Award | Won | |
| Woman of the Year by Grazia Bulgaria | 2026 | Herself | Music Category | Won | |
| Woman of the Year by Glamour Bulgaria | 2026 | Herself | Inspiration Category | Won | |

== Notes ==
Awards and achievements
| Preceded by Intelligent Music Project with "Intention" | Bulgaria in the Eurovision Song Contest; 2026 | Succeeded by TBD |
| Preceded by (Austria) JJ with "Wasted Love" | Winner of the Eurovision Song Contest; 2026 | Succeeded by TBD |
