= Tita (singer) =

- Born: Hristina Milenova Pencheva; 19 July 1999 (age 27); Tutrakan, Bulgaria
- Genres: Pop; teen pop; R&B; electronic
- Occupations: Singer; model; actress
- Years active: 2014–present
- Labels: Adamand; Facing The Sun

Hristina Milenova Pencheva (Bulgarian: Христина Миленова Пенчева), better known by her stage name Tita, (born 19 July 1999) is a Bulgarian singer, model, and actress who rose to fame in late 2014 after participating in X Factor Bulgaria. Tita is currently signed to Bulgarian hip hop artist Krisko's record label imprint Adamand Records.

== Career ==
=== 2014–2015: X-Factor and Sweet 16 ===
Born in Tutrakan, in 2014 Hristina auditioned in the Bulgarian version of the reality show The X Factor as part of the Sweet 16 girl band. She joined the show as a solo performer, but later X-Factor judges formed a girl's group with Hristina, Gery-Nikol and Mishel Straminski, with Bulgarian singer Zaki as their mentor. They left the competition after being eliminated in the seventh live show.

=== 2016–present: Adamand Records ===
Following her departure from X Factor Bulgaria, Hristina started performing as a model, presenting for Bulgarian modeling agency Megz Angels. On 6 October 2016 she was announced as the first recording artist to be signed to Krisko's label Adamand Records. Hristina subsequently adopted the stage name Tita and her debut single "Voodoo Kukla" was released on the same day featuring Krisko, accompanied by a music video. Her second single entitled "Kasay" was revealed on 19 May 2017. On 6 December 2017 she presented her third single "Antilopa" to the public. In 2018, she made her first guest appearance on Krisko's song "Iskam Da Buda S Teb", where she performed the chorus.

In 2019 Tita was one of the stars of the Bulgarian TV show "Kato Dve Kapki Voda".

== Acting ==
In mid-2017, Hristina appeared on the Bulgarian web-based teen drama series Sledvai Me (Follow Me), where she played the protagonist, Bela.

== Discography ==
Tita discography
- Singles: 20
- Music videos: 10

=== Albums ===
- Аз съм ТИТА(2020)

=== Singles ===
==== As lead artist ====
Title	Year	Peak chart positions										Certifications	Album
Title	Year	BUL	AUS	AUT	FRA	GER	ITA	NZ	SWE	UK	US	Certifications	Album
"Voodoo Kukla" (featuring Krisko)	2016	25	—	—	—	—	—	—	—	—	—		Non-album singles
"Kasay"	2017	—	—	—	—	—	—	—	—	—	—		Non-album singles
"Antilopa"	2017	5	—	—	—	—	—	—	—	—	—		Non-album singles
"Photoshop"	2018												
"Purva Sreshta"	2019												
“Purviat Chovek”	2019												
“Minimumut”	2020												

==== As featured artist ====
Title	Year	Peak chart positions										Certifications	Album
Title	Year	BUL	AUS	AUT	FRA	GER	ITA	NZ	SWE	UK	US	Certifications	Album
"Iskam Da Buda S Teb" (Krisko featuring Tita)	2018	2	—	—	—	—	—	—	—	—	—		Non-album singles
"Zadnata Sedalka" (Boro Purvi featuring Tita)	2019	28	—	—	—	—	—	—	—	—	—		Non-album singles
"—" denotes a recording that did not chart or was not released in that territory.													Non-album singles

=== Music videos ===
Year	Title	Director	Artist(s)
2016	"Voodoo Kukla"	Kiko	Featuring Krisko
2017	“Kusay”	Kiko	
2017	“Antilopa”	Kiko	
2018	"Photoshop"	Kiko	
2018	“Iskam Da Buda s Teb”	Kiko	Featuring Krisko
2019	“Zadnata Sedalka“	Bashmotion	Featuring БОРО ПЪРВИ
2019	"Purva Sreshta"	Kiko	
2019	“Ti Gonish”	Demetry Vasilev	Featuring Papi Hans
2019	“Purviat Chovek”	Valeri Milev	
2020	“Minimumut”	Kiko	

== Filmography ==
Television
Year	Title	Role	Notes
2014–2015	X Factor Bulgaria	Herself – Performer	Season 3
2017–	Sledvai me	Bela	Season 1 Season 2
