= Monoir =

Romanian songwriter and record producer (born 1998)

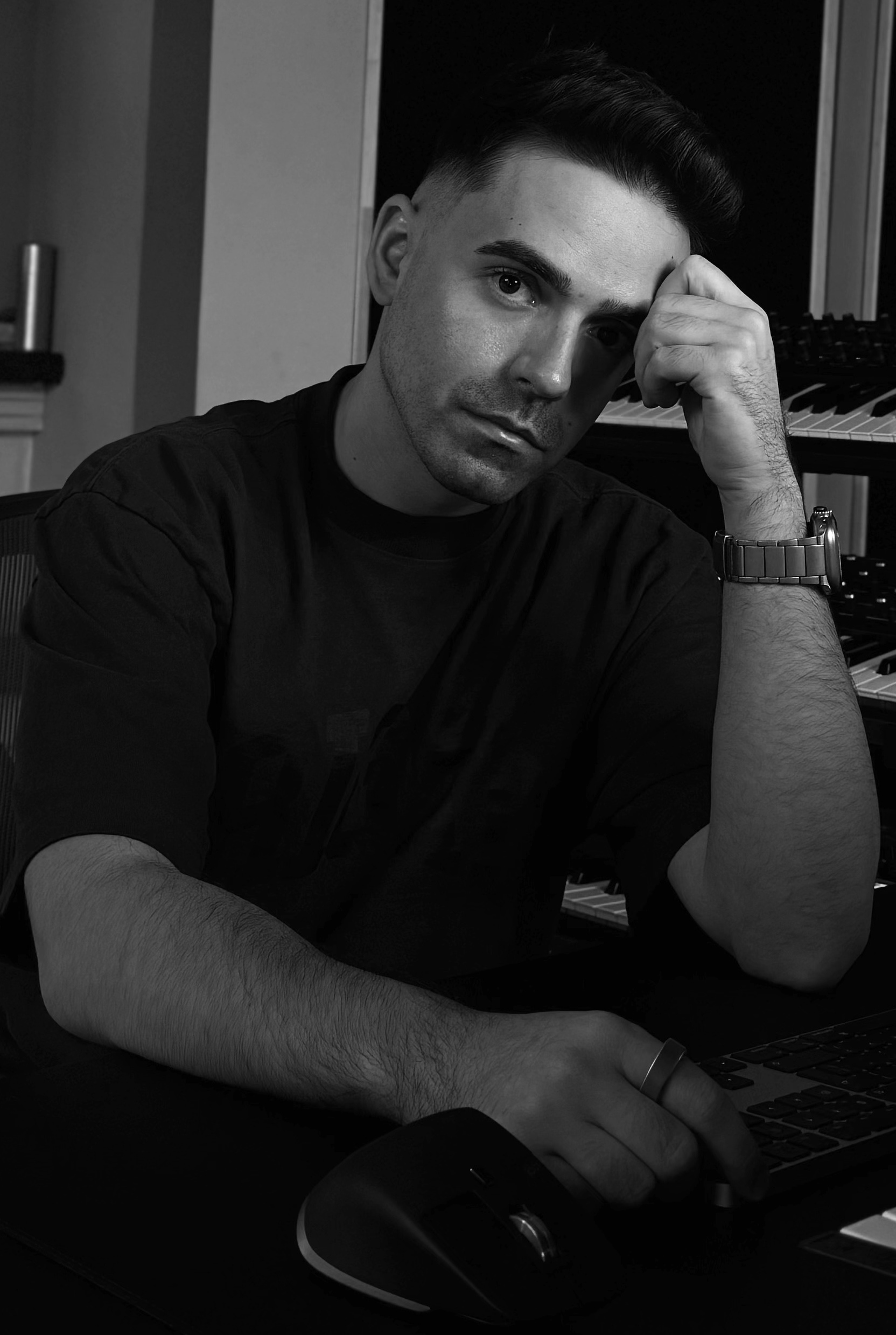
- Monoir in 2025

Background information
- Born: Cristian Nicolae Tarcea; 17 April 1993 (age 33); Constanța, Romania
- Occupations: Record producer; singer; songwriter
- Instruments: Piano; drum kit; synthesizer; guitar
- Years active: 2008–present
- Labels: Cat Music; Thrace Music

Cristian Nicolae Tarcea (Romanian pronunciation: [kristiˈan nikoˈla.e ˈtart͡ʃe̯a]; born 17 April 1993), known professionally as Monoir, is a Romanian record producer, songwriter, and DJ. He is a co-writer and producer of the song "Bangaranga", which won the Eurovision Song Contest 2026, performed by Bulgarian singer Dara.

== Biography ==
Tarcea was born in Constanța, Romania. He began studying music at an early age, reportedly starting around the age of five. He began composing and producing music from 2008.

In 2012, Tarcea has founded his own record label named Thrace Music, the same name as his studio.

He is reported in Romanian media to have studied at the Regina Maria National College of Arts in Constanța and later pursued higher education in music-related fields.

== Career ==
Over time, he has worked with local artists, and has also collaborated with international names from mixed musical genres such as Antonia and Alexandra Stan. Tarcea is one of the producers and composers of the song "Bangaranga" performed by Bulgarian singer Dara, won the Eurovision Song Contest 2026.

The entry marked Bulgaria's first victory in the competition and was widely reported in international media coverage.
