= Preyah =

- Born: Preyah-Eyrin-Comfort Rex Dimitrov; September 22, 1994 (age 32); Sofia, Bulgaria
- Genres: Pop; R&B; Soul; Afrobeats; Urban Pop
- Occupation: Singer-songwriter
- Instrument: Vocals
- Years active: 2011 – present
- Labels: Monte Music (2013–2018); Independent (2018–present)

Preyah-Eyrin-Comfort Rex Osassey (Bulgarian: Прея-Ейрин-Комфорт Рекс Осасей, born 22 September 1994), known professionally as Preyah, is a Bulgarian singer and songwriter who first became known through her features on songs by Grafa, Billy Hlapeto and Mihaela Fileva.

== Early life ==
Preyah was born in Sofia in 1994 to a Bulgarian mother and a Nigerian father, who died when she was a child. Her mother Sabina worked in Cyprus when Preyah was 13 years old, so they could pay the mortgage on their apartment.

== Career ==
=== Early career ===
Preyah was part of a vocal group in her childhood. In 2011 she appeared on the first season of Bulgarian X Factor but only made it through the boot camp stage. In 2013, she joined the Music Academy show, where she was eliminated in the semifinals, though the producers of the show Monte Music offered her a contract nevertheless.

=== 2013–2018: Debut single and Monte Music releases ===
Preyah's debut single with Billy Hlapeto Malkite Neshta was released in 2014 and immediately became the most played video on Bulgarian TV in its debut week. The song was originally recorded as Guilty Pleasure Store, and had been previously performed by Preyah with Smooth during the 2012 Spirit of Burgas festival. Her first individual single was Nyuansi which was completed in early 2015. The release of "Nyuansi" marked the beginning of Preyah's work as a solo recording artist.

== Discography ==
Title	Year	Peak chart positions						Album
Title	Year	BUL	US	CAN	IRE	NZ	UK	Album
Malkite Neshta (Billy Hlapeto feat. Preyah)	2014	6	—	—	—	—	—	—N/a
Zakasnyavam, chovek (Grafa feat. Preyah and Pechenkata)	2014	12	—	—	—	—	—	—N/a
Nyuansi	2015	11	—	—	—	—	—	—N/a
Pozvoli mi da Znam	2015	15	—	—	—	—	—	—N/a
Zabranen Dostap (Mihaela Fileva feat. Preyah and Divna)	2015	8	—	—	—	—	—	—N/a
Vsichki Nashi Mesta	2015	3	—	—	—	—	—	—N/a
Prazni Prizkazki (feat. VenZy)	2016	18	—	—	—	—	—	—N/a
Ubiec Na Vreme	2017	24	—	—	—	—	—	—N/a
Lo6 Navik	2019	—	—	—	—	—	—	Preyah
"—" denotes a recording that did not chart or was not released in that territory.
