= Krisko =

Bulgarian rapper (born 1988)

Krisko Криско
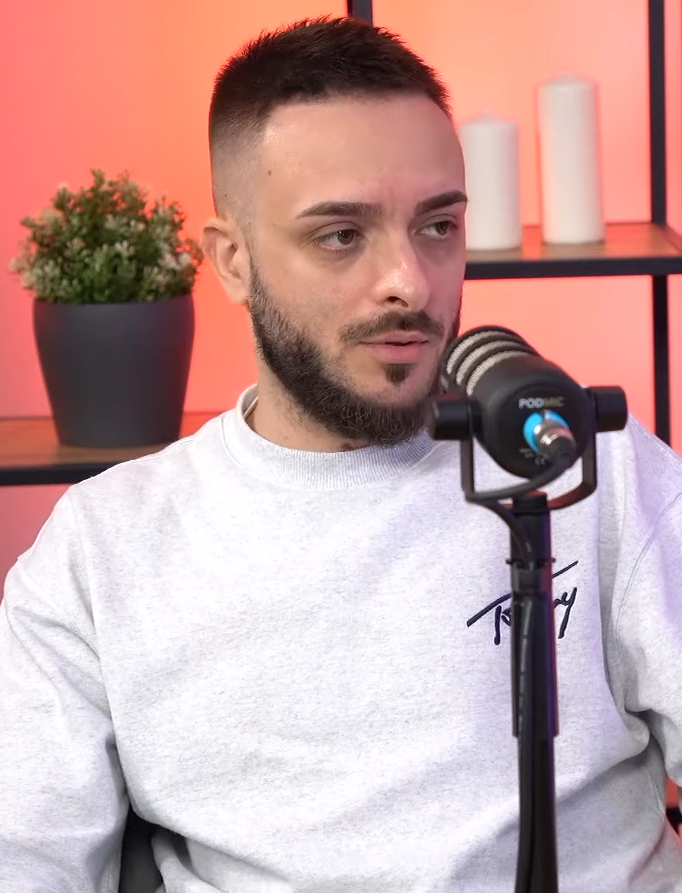
- Krisko in May 2024

Background information
- Birth name: Kristian Radoslavov Talev
- Also known as: Krisko Beats
- Born: 11 May 1988 (age 36); Sofia, Bulgaria
- Origin: Gabrovo, Bulgaria
- Genres: Hip hop; R&B; Pop
- Occupations: Rapper; Singer; Music Producer
- Instrument: vocals
- Years active: 2004–present
- Labels: Adamand; Facing The Sun; Warner Music Germany
- Website: krisko.bg

Kristian Radoslavov Talev (Bulgarian: Кристиан Радославов Талев; born 11 May 1988) better known by his stage name Krisko (Bulgarian: Криско), is a Bulgarian recording artist, songwriter, producer and entrepreneur. He is signed to the Bulgarian record label Facing The Sun Records and is also co-owner of the label Adamand Records.

== Early life ==
Kristian Talev was born on 11 May 1988 in the Bulgarian capital Sofia. Having spent most of his childhood in Gabrovo, his interest in music stems from his family and relatives, who inspired him to pursue a serious involvement in music. His career started from an early age by participating in notable Bulgarian children TV shows such as Bon-Bon and Koi e po po nai. In the follow-up years, he adopted the stage name Krisko and began writing his own songs.

== Career ==
=== 2005–2011: Early career ===
Krisko started to write his own songs in 2005, being part of a neighborhood group. Later he started studying sound engineering and in 2008 he worked as a sound engineer in Radio 1 Bulgaria. From 2009 to 2010 he was briefly signed to Bulgarian rapper Spens's CCCP (Sam Sam Si Records) label as a producer and performer. Together they recorded the song Neka Sam Sam and in 2010 he made his breakthrough with the single Ludo Noshti featuring Bulgarian Eurovision performer Elitsa Todorova.

=== 2011–2016: Breakthrough of Krisko Beats ===
Following a dispute with Spens in 2011, Krisko left his label and adopted the production tag "Krisko Beats". Subsequently, he was one of the first artists signed to the newly founded Bulgarian record label Facing The Sun both as a performer and a producer.

Kriskо's projects Slagam Krai with Nevena and Miro, Koi Den Stanahme with Angel & Moisei, Ministara na Veselieto featuring Bobo and Lora Karadzhova, Vidimo Dovolni with Maria Ilieva, Zlatnite Momcheta featuring Dim4ou and a feature in Gery-Nikol's debut single Ela i si Vzemi all gained exceptional positions in the Bulgarian Music Charts. Moreover, the Council for Electronic Media of Bulgaria considered the song Vidimo Dovolni after a lot of signals about the censorship of the song.

In 2015, Krisko became part of the 4th season of X Factor Bulgaria, where he mentored the female singers. Darina Yotova from his team made it through the finals. Under Krisko's mentorship she started performing under the stage name Dara and was later signed to Virginia Records.

=== 2016–present: New projects and Adamand Records ===
On 20 April 2016 Krisko announced the single Dali Tova Lyubov e citing it as "a bit different project from his other songs with a love theme". The video was recorded in Bali, Indonesia featuring a local Indonesian model as his love interest. In September 2016, Krisko premiered the song #OET, known as Oshte Edin Tants, which was also highlighted with a romantic thematic. The video of the song was filmed in Dubai, United Arab Emirates together with his girlfriend Tsvetelina Todorova.

On 8 September 2016 Krisko announced the establishment of his own record label under the name of Adamand Records in a joint effort with Bulgarian film producer Kiril Kirov.

On 6 October 2016, Krisko was featured on Bulgarian singer Tita's debut single "Voodoo Kukla". She also became the first performer to be signed to Krisko's label Adamand Records.

In 2018, Krisko signed two Bulgarian rappers: Boro and Dim40u.

== Discography ==
=== Singles ===
Year	Title	Peak chart positions		Album
Year	Title	BUL	BUL	Album
2010	Neka sam sam (feat. Spens)	40	—	Non-album single
2011	Ludi Noshti (feat. Elitsa Todorova)	31	—	Non-album single
2011	Slagam Krai (feat. Nevena and Miro)	1	—	Non-album single
2012	Nalej, Nalej (feat. Nevena and Miro)	11	—	Non-album single
2012	Pochivni Dni	8	—	Krisko Beats
2012	Koi Den Stanahme (feat. Angel & Moisei)	1	—	Non-album single
2013	Ne Dalzha Nishto	12	—	Non-album single
2013	Drop Some	15	—	Non-album single
2013	Nikoi Drug (feat. Deep Zone)	4	—	Non-album single
2013	Ministara na Veselieto (feat. Bobo and Lora)	1	—	Non-album single
2013	Znaesh li Koi Vidyah (feat. Angel & Moisei)	13	—	Non-album single
2013	Nyama Kvo da Stane	13	—	Non-album single
2013	Ideal Petroff	9	—	Non-album single
2014	Horata Govoryat	5	—	Non-album single
2014	Vidimo Dovolni (feat.Maria Ilieva)	1	—	Non-album single
2014	Bilo Kvot Bilo	9	—	Non-album single
2015	Zlatnite Momcheta (feat. Dim4ou)	1	—	Non-album single
2015	Ne mi Ubivai Kefa (feat. Santra)	6	—	Non-album single
2015	Shapka ti Svalyam (feat. Nencho Balabanov)	17	3	Non-album single
2015	Ela i si Vzemi (feat. Gery-Nikol)	1	1	Non-album single
2015	Nashiyat Zhivot (feat. Bon-Bon)	18	1	Non-album single
2016	Nazdrave	21	2	Non-album single
2016	Dali Tova Lyubov E	4	1	Non-album single
2016	#OET	—	1	Non-album single
2017	Losh ili Dobar	1	1	Non-album single
2017	Bazooka	1	1	

=== Albums ===
- Krisko Beats (2012)

== Filmography ==
Television
Year	Title	Role	Notes
2013	Music Academy Bulgaria	Himself	TV show
2015–present	X Factor Bulgaria	Himself – Judge	Season 4
2016	Peesh ili luzhesh	Himself, guest artist	Season 1
