= Mihaela Fileva =

Bulgarian singer

Mihaela Fileva Михаела Филева
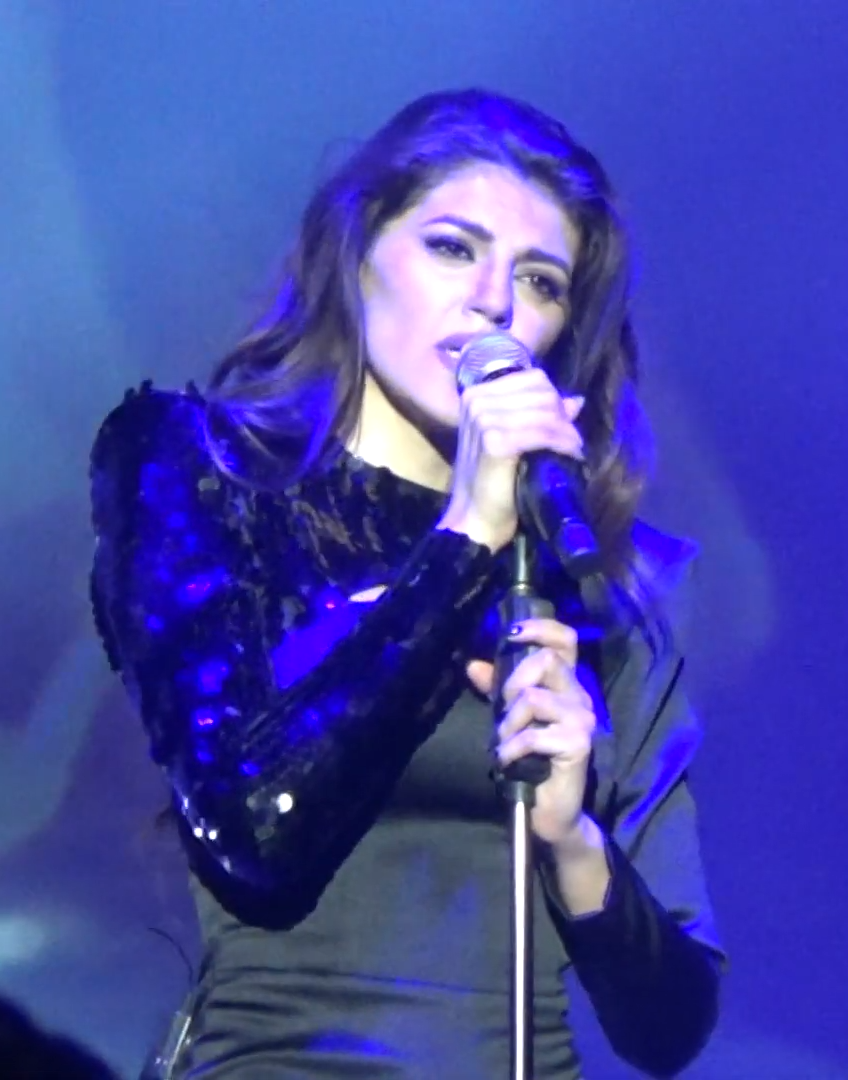
- Fileva in May 2020

Background information
- Born: Mihaela Fileva; May 15, 1992 (age 34); Veliko Tarnovo, Bulgaria
- Genres: Pop, R&B, Soul, Jazz
- Occupation: Singer-songwriter
- Instrument: Vocals
- Years active: 2005–present
- Labels: Virginia Records, Monte music, Manifest Music
- Partner: Stefan Radov

Mihaela Tinkova Fileva (Bulgarian: Михаела Тинкова Филева) (born May 15, 1991) is a Bulgarian singer-songwriter and producer. Her career started in 2005 when she won the Bulgarian National Television show – “Hit Minus One”. Her big breakthrough was in 2011 when she was a finalist in The X factor Bulgaria.

== Biography ==
Fileva was born in Veliko Tarnovo on May 15, 1991. She began playing piano and singing at the age of 6. At 9 she took her first dance classes. She won the music show "Hit-1" in 2006. She studied in The National Academy of Music "Prof. Pancho Vladigerov".

=== Education ===
She graduated from the High School of mathematics and natural sciences "Vasil Drumev" in her hometown Veliko Tarnovo and then studied jazz and pop at The National Academy of Music “Prof. Pancho Vladigerov”, Sofia

== Music career ==
Mihaela has won multiple awards including "Female singer of the Year" award winner (BG Radio, Box TV, 359 Hip-Hop Music Awards), "Album of the Year" and "Lyrics of the year" (BG Radio), "Woman of The Year" (in Music, Grazia magazine).

Mihaela first made an impression in 2011 as one of the finalists in "X-factor". Her appearance was noticed by the audience and some music producers and soon after she signed with the label Monte Music. In 2012 Mihaela released a single with Billy Hlapeto called "Kogato ti triabvam".

A few months later, the release of Mihaela's single "Opasno blizki", ft. VenZy, made her nationally popular as it turned into a smash hit. It was followed by "A dano, ama nadali" and "Prilivi i otlivi". Once Mihaela released her debut album "Incognito", it was evidence that she is a productive songwriter and artist. Her singles "Na ryba na ludostta", "Edno naum", "I az sym tuk" and "Incognito" topped the charts in Bulgaria. The release of her second album „Nova stranitsa" was followed by a sold out concert in one of the biggest concert halls in Sofia and a national tour. The title song, written by Mihaela herself, is considered a masterpiece. In 2020 her third album was released, it was the first live one called “Live in NDK”. The latest hit singles "Yin&Yang", "100 na 100"/"All The Way", "Latino Señorita", "Na drugia krai na sveta", "Rodena s kasmet" are included in Mihaela's fourth album "Yin&Yang", released in 2021 and presented with national tour.

In 2015 she wrote Mihaela Marinova's debut single "Стъпка напред".

On April 18, 2019 she gave her first solo concert in Hall 1 of The National Palace of Culture in Sofia.

The X Factor performances and results
Episode	Theme	Song	Result
First audition	Free choice	""	Through to bootcamp
Bootcamp – stage 1	Group performance	""	Through to stage 2
Bootcamp – stage 2	Solo performance	""	Through to judges' houses
Judges' houses	Free choice	""	Through to live shows
Live show 1	Heroes	""	Safe
Live show 2	Rock hits	""	Left the show (12th)
Live show 2	Final showdown	""	Left the show (12th)

== Albums ==
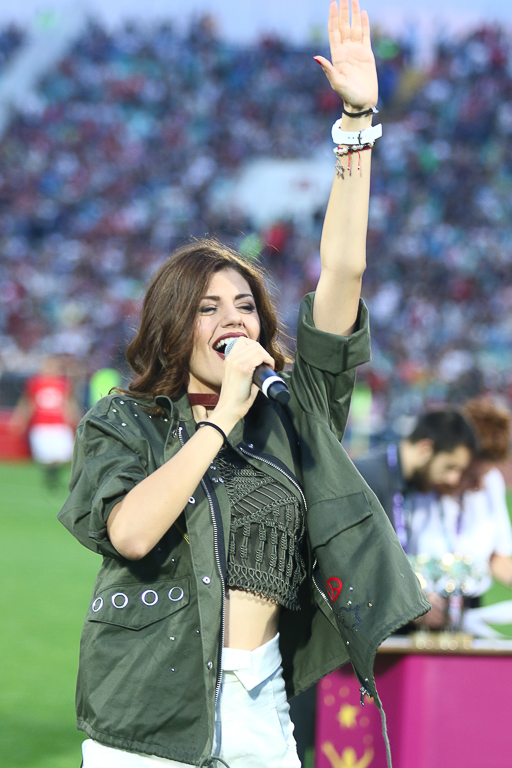
Fileva in 2019

=== Studio albums ===
List of studio albums, with selected chart positions, sales figures and certifications
Title	Album details	Peak chart positions	Sales
Title	Album details	BUL	Sales
Incognito	Released: May 28, 2015; Label: Monte Music; Formats: CD, digital download, LP	2	
Nova stranitsa	Released: May 29, 2018; Label: Monte Music; Formats: CD, digital download, LP	—	
In i Yan	Released: May 15, 2021; Label: Monte Music; Formats: CD, digital download, LP	—	
96	Released: October 20, 2023; Label: Monte Music; Formats: CD, digital download, LP	—	

== Singles ==
Title	Year	Peak chart positions	Album
Title	Year	BUL	Album
"Kogato ti tryabvam" (Billy Hlapeto feat. Mihaela Fileva)	2012	3	Incognito
"Opasno blizki" (feat. Venzy)	2013	1	Incognito
"A dano, ama nadali" (Grafa feat. Mihaela Fileva & VenZy)	2013	2	—N/a
"Dai znak pak" (Absolyutni zhivotni feat. Mihaela Fileva)	2013	8	—N/a
"Prilivi i otlivi"	2013	17	Incognito
"Ima li nachin" (feat. Nickname)	2014	12	Incognito
"V reda na neshtata" (feat. Billy Hlapeto)	2014	18	Incognito
"Edno naum"	2014	28	Incognito
"I az sum tuk"	2014	18	Incognito
"Na raba na ludosta" (feat. Grafa)	2015	1	Incognito
"Zabranen dostap" (feat. Divna & Preyah)	2015	8	Incognito
"Incognito"	2015	11	Incognito
"Film za dvama"	2016	8	Incognito
Tantsuvam samo za teb" feat Iskren Tonchev – Iskrata	2016	8	Nova stranitsa
„Konets"	2017	—	Nova stranitsa
„Lyubov" (feat. Pavell & Venci Venc')	2017	—	Nova stranitsa
"#BOYCOTT" (feat. Venzy)	2017	—	Nova stranitsa
"Posledni dumi“ "	2017	—	Nova stranitsa
„Bez etiketi"	2018	—	Nova stranitsa
"Igraem za pobeda" (feat. Iskren Tonchev - Iskrata)	2018	—	Nova stranitsa
"Tsyala Nosht"	2018	—	Nova stranitsa
"Chronometer" (feat. Svilen Noev)	2018	—	In i Yan
"Nova Stranitsa"	2019	—	Nova stranitsa
"Latino Senorita" (feat. ToTo H)	2019	—	In i Yan
"Zavrashtane" (with Orlin Pavlov)	2019	—	In i Yan
"Izgubeni v raya"	2019	—	Nova Stranitsa
"Na drugiya krai na sveta" (feat. NDOE)	2020	—	In i Yan
"Rodena s kasmet"	2020	—	In i Yan
"In your eyes" (feat. Daniele Guastella)	2020	—	—N/a
"100 na 100"	2020	—	In i Yan
"Schupen grad" (feat. EXC)	2021	—	Nova stranitsa
"In i Yan" (feat. Zhluch)	2021	—	In i Yan
"Agenda" with Grafa	2021	—	96
"Opora"	2022	—	In i Yan
"Po dobra ot men"	2022	—	In i Yan
"Obsesben"	2022	—	96
"Po navik"	2023	—	96
"Lyubov bez imena"	2023	—	96
"Besame, mi amor" (feat. VenZy)	2023	—	96
Vsichko e bilo za dobro" (feat. Dara Ekimova)	2024	—	96
"Opasni shmatki" (feat. Alex P)	2024	—	—N/a
"La Musica"	2024	—	96
"Posledna sulza"	2025	—	96
"Dopaminov geroi"	2025	—	TBA
"Koya e tya?"	2025	—	96
"Santa Tell Me"	2025	—	TBA
"Burya v tchasha voda"	2026	—	TBA
"Sluntseto pak izgrya"	2026	—	TBA
"Insomniya"	2026	—	TBA
