= Glasat na Bulgaria season 10 =

Glasat na Bulgaria
- Season 10
- Promotional poster featuring coaches Maria Ilieva, Dara, Miro and Ivan Lechev
- Hosted by: Ivan Tishev
- Coaches: Ivan Lechev; Dara; Maria Ilieva; Miro
- Winner: Nadezhda Kovacheva
- Winning coach: Miro
- Runner-up: Dimitrina Germanova

Release
- Original network: bTV
- Original release: 10 September – 17 December 2023

Season chronology
- ← Previous; Season 9 Next → Season 11

The tenth season of Bulgarian singing reality competition Glasat na Bulgaria premiered on 10 September 2023. This season features some changes in the coaching panel, as only Ivan Lechev and Dara return from the previous season. Former coach Miro, who participated in the first three seasons, and new coach Maria Ilieva join the panel. Meanwhile, Ivan Tishev remains as the host of the program.

Nadezhda Kovacheva was crowned as the "voice", marking Miro's second win as a coach.

== Coaches and hosts ==
Coaches of Glasat na Bulgaria season ten

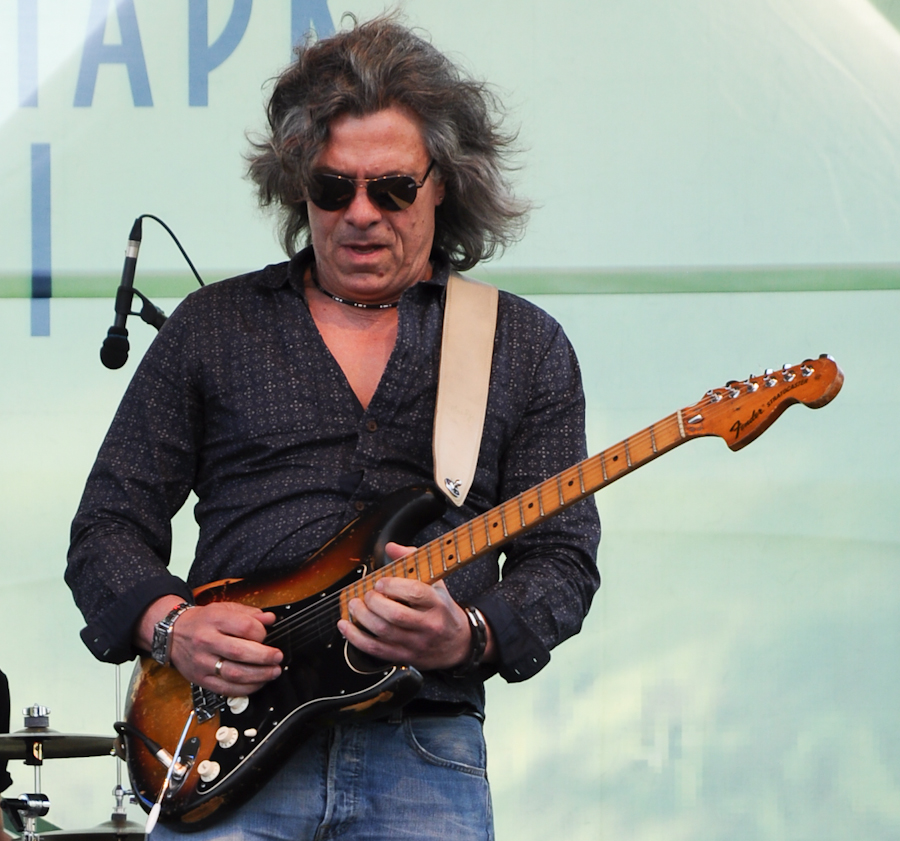
Ivan Lechev

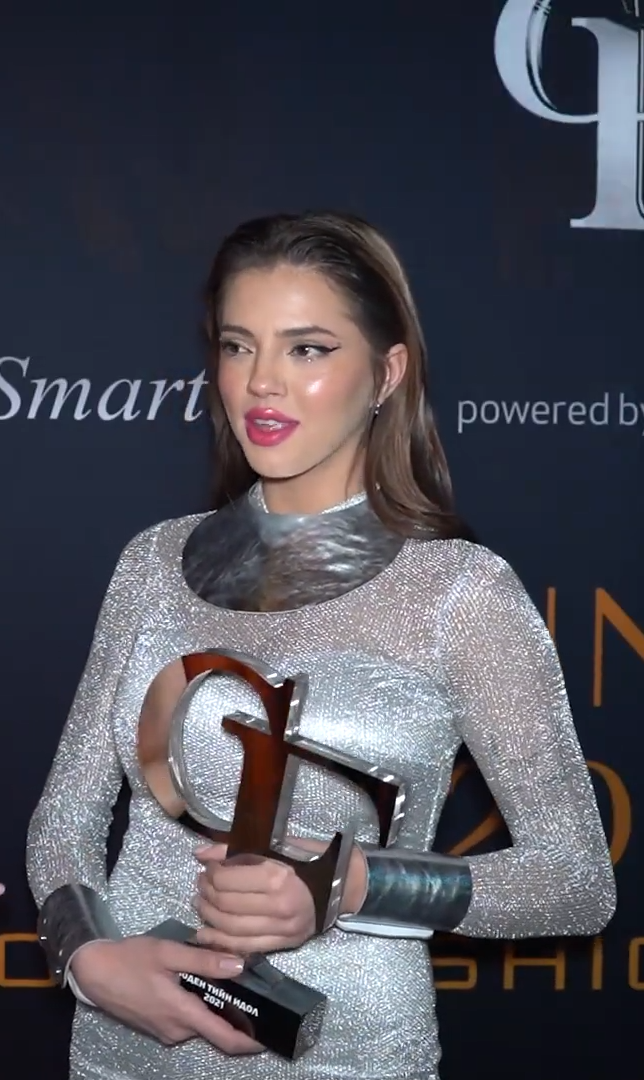
Dara

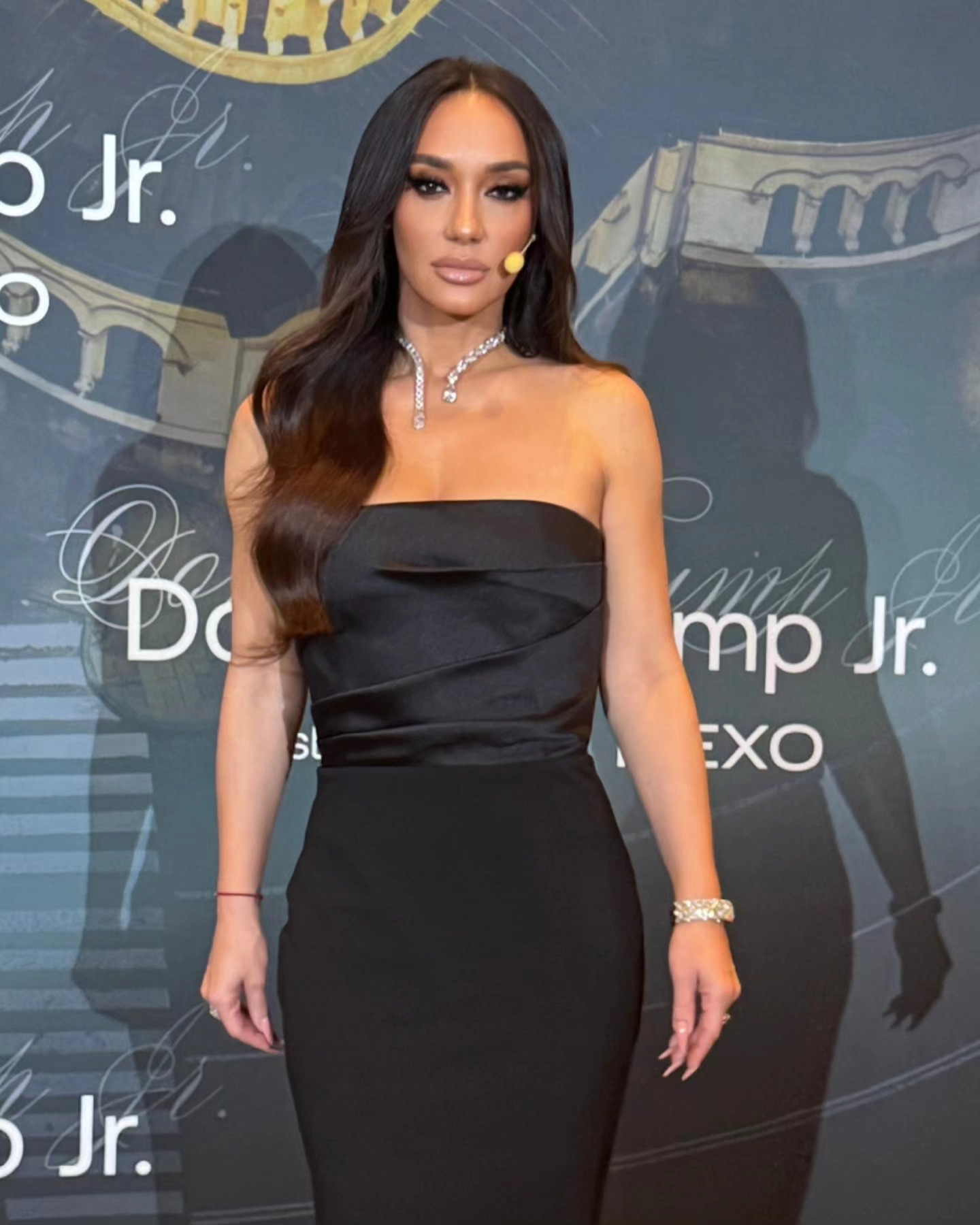
Maria Ilieva

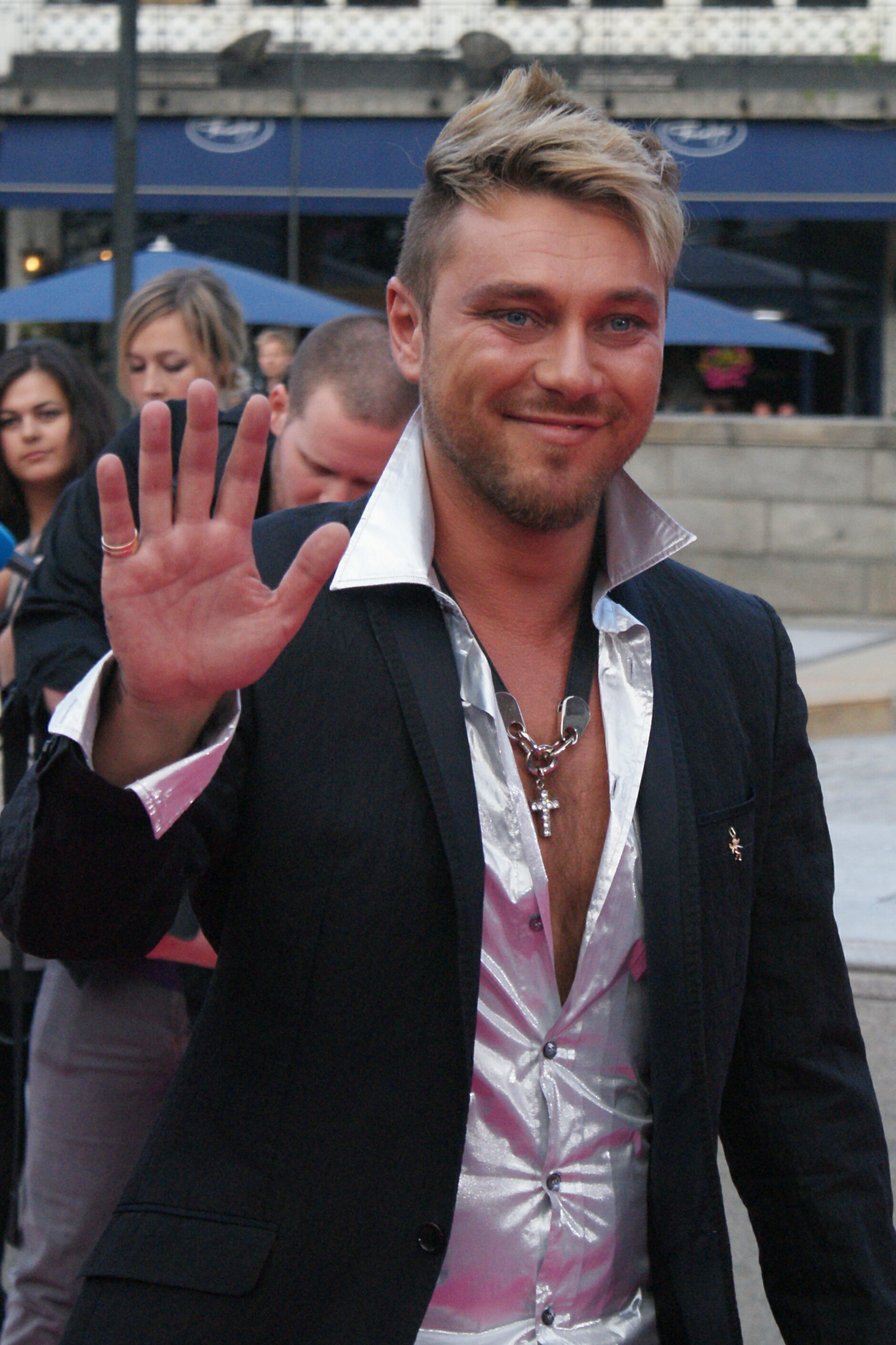
Miro

Some changes in the coaching panel are seen in this season as only Ivan Lechev and Dara return from the previous season. They are joined by Miro, who returns after being part of the jury in the first three seasons of the program, and Maria Ilieva, who was a battle advisor on the previous season.

Ivan Tishev remains as the presenter. This year there are online behind the scenes episodes, but without an online "V-Reporter".

== Teams ==
- Winner
- Runner-up
- Third place
- Fourth place
- Fifth place
- Sixth place
- Eliminated in the Live semi-final
- Eliminated in the Knockouts
- Stolen in the Battles
- Artist was eliminated after being switched with another stolen artist
- Eliminated in the Battles
- Eliminated in the Final selection

Coaching teams
| Coaches | Top 65 Artists | | | | |
|---|---|---|---|---|---|
| Ivan Lechev | | | | | |
| Ivan Lechev | Maria Koleva | Kaloyan Paunov | Georgi Georgiev | Zornitsa Petrova | Georgi Arsov |
| Ivan Lechev | Boyana Karpatova | Martin Sabkov | Konstantin Katsarov | Alexander Simeonov | Alessandra Francesconi |
| Ivan Lechev | Gergana Stoyanova | Preslava Velikova | Dimitar Angelov | Violeta Milenina | Nevena Momneva |
| Ivan Lechev | Ivelin Georgiev | | | | |
| Dara | | | | | |
| Dara | Nikola Yanakiev | Arcangelo D'Angelo | Valeria Voykova | Aleksandra Georgieva | Tea Yordanova |
| Dara | Katrin Gacheva | Severin Georgiev | Nikol Antonova | ~~Alexander Kolev~~ | Juliano Emilov |
| Dara | Yosif Bambin | Tsvetomira Todorova | Teodor Haralambiev | Valentina Angelova | Damyan Apostolov |
| Dara | Eleonora Stoyanova | Francesco Di Cello | | | |
| Maria Ilieva | | | | | |
| Maria Ilieva | Dimitrina Germanova | Simeon Slavev | Marin Rusinov | Aleksandra Borisova | Polina Aleksieva |
| Maria Ilieva | Arika Adams | Konstantina Dimitrova | Boyka Shtereva | ~~Arcangelo D'Angelo~~ | Maria Stefanova |
| Maria Ilieva | Mira Popova | Dona Ovcharova | Nikolay Bakalov | Mischel | Djaima |
| Maria Ilieva | Maria Hiteva | Ralitsa Postolova | Tsvetana Dicheva | | |
| Miro | | | | | |
| Miro | Nadezhda Kovacheva | Elena Popova | Yanitsa Kaneva | Alexander Kolev | Martin Aleksandrov |
| Miro | Pamela Megan Apsi | Dani Ilieva | Denis Potrevaev | ~~Boyka Shtereva~~ | ~~Boyana Karpatova~~ |
| Miro | Orphy | Mario Nikolov | Sarai Diaz | Miroslav Marinov | Natali Nedelcheva |
| Miro | Gabriela Hubenov | Ivana Nikolova | An Nikol Ilieva | | |
Note: Italicized names are stolen artists (names struck through within former teams).

== Blind auditions ==
The show began with the blind auditions. In each audition, an artist sings their piece in front of the coaches whose chairs are facing the audience. If a coach is interested to work with the artist, they will press their button to face the artist. If a singular coach presses the button, the artist automatically becomes part of their team. If multiple coaches turn, they will compete for the artist, who will decide which team they will join.

Continuing the rule from the previous season, coaches could have an unlimited number of contestants on their team and finalize them at the end of the auditions. This season, the blocking rule that is similar to the twelfth season of the French version was applied where coaches can block another coach only after the audition ended, and their chair will turn to the audience backwards. Each coach is given two super-blocks to use.

Blind auditions color key
| ✔ | Coach pressed "I WANT YOU" button |
| | Artist joined this coach's team |
| | Artist selected to join this coach's team |
| | Artist was eliminated as no coach pressed their button |
| | Artist was, initially, part of the team but was eliminated on the cut round |
| ✘ | Coach pressed "I WANT YOU" button, but was: |
| | Blocked by Ivan; Blocked by Dara; Blocked by Maria; Blocked by Miro |

=== Episode 1 (10 September) ===
| Order | Artist | Age | Hometown | Song | Coach's and artist's choices | | | |
| Order | Artist | Age | Hometown | Song | Ivan | Dara | Maria | Miro |
|---|---|---|---|---|---|---|---|---|
| 1 | Dimitrina Germanova | 19 | Dobrich | "Creep" | ✔ | ✔ | ✔ | ✘ |
| 2 | Alexander Simeonov | 41 | Pleven | "Here I Go Again" | ✔ | ✔ | ✔ | ✔ |
| 3 | Juliano Emilov | 18 | Damyanitsa | "Stand Up" | ✔ | ✔ | — | — |
| 4 | Dimitur Lazarov | 46 | Sofia | "Bailando" | — | — | — | — |
| 5 | Boyka Shtereva | 43 | Pazardzhik | "Ain't Nobody" | ✔ | ✔ | ✔ | ✔ |
| 6 | Dimitar Gospodinov | 30 | Berlin | "Lonely Boy" | — | — | — | — |
| 7 | Konstantina Dimitrova | 16 | Blagoevgrad | "Ostani Tazi Nosht" | ✔ | ✔ | ✔ | ✔ |
| 8 | Alexander Kolev | 17 | Pleven | "Beggin' | ✔ | ✔ | — | — |
| 9 | Maria Koleva | 37 | Kurdzhali | "Purple Rain" | ✔ | ✔ | — | — |
| 10 | Nadezhda Kovacheva | 17 | Panagyurishte | "And I Am Telling You I'm Not Going" | ✔ | ✔ | ✘ | ✔ |

=== Episode 2 (17 September) ===
| Order | Artist | Age | Hometown | Song | Coach's and artist's choices | | | |
| Order | Artist | Age | Hometown | Song | Ivan | Dara | Maria | Miro |
|---|---|---|---|---|---|---|---|---|
| 1 | Nikola Yanakiev | 20 | Sozopol | "Iron Sky" | ✔ | ✔ | ✘ | — |
| 2 | Arika Adams | 20 | Plovdiv | "Summertime Sadness" | — | ✔ | ✔ | — |
| 3 | Miroslav Marinov | 40 | Vidin | "Placheshto Sartse" | — | — | ✔ | ✔ |
| 4 | Preslava Velikova | 27 | Ruse | "Metal Meltdown" | ✔ | ✔ | ✔ | ✔ |
| 5 | Valentina Angelova | 28 | Burgas | "The Boy Does Nothing" | — | ✔ | ✔ | — |
| 6 | Konstantin Kovachev | 26 | Sofia | "Ne moga da spra da te obicham" | — | — | — | — |
| 7 | Marin Rusinov | 34 | Gabrovo | "Cherno i byalo" | ✔ | ✔ | ✔ | — |
| 8 | Radoslav Gergov | 38 | Knezha | "Freak on a Leash" | — | — | — | — |
| 9 | Tsvetomira Todorova | 17 | Sofia | "Az li sam ili ne sam" | ✔ | ✔ | ✔ | ✔ |
| 10 | Yanitsa Kaneva | 33 | Varna | "Tsvete moe" | ✔ | ✔ | ✘ | ✔ |

- Comedian Nikolaos Tsitiridis made a surprise guest appearance singing "My Way', dressed as 74 years old Petar Tsonev from Kazanlak.

=== Episode 3 (24 September) ===
| Order | Artist | Age | Hometown | Song | Coach's and artist's choices | | | |
| Order | Artist | Age | Hometown | Song | Ivan | Dara | Maria | Miro |
|---|---|---|---|---|---|---|---|---|
| 1 | Valeria Voykova | 16 | Sofia | "Moy svyat" | ✔ | ✔ | ✔ | ✘ |
| 2 | Kaloyan Paunov | 25 | Veliko Tarnovo | "Hole Hearted" | ✔ | ✔ | ✔ | ✔ |
| 3 | Veselina Foteva | 40 | Varna | "Ha-ha" | — | — | — | — |
| 4 | Pamela Megan Apsi | 27 | Sofia | "Disco Inferno" | — | — | — | ✔ |
| 5 | Simeon Slavev | 16 | Gorna Oryahovitsa | "Utre otnovo" | — | ✔ | ✔ | — |
| 6 | Aleksandr Aleksandrov | 33 | Lom | "Amalipe" | — | — | — | — |
| 7 | Boyana Karpatova | 34 | Gotse Delchev | "Nothing Else Matters" | ✔ | ✔ | ✔ | ✔ |
| 8 | Yosif Bambin | 28 | Rakovski | "Feeling Good" | — | ✔ | — | — |
| 9 | Kristina Mavrova | 27 | Burgas | "Chandelier" | — | — | — | — |
| 10 | Aleksandra Borisova | 26 | Kyustendil | "At Last" | ✔ | ✔ | ✔ | ✔ |
| 11 | Konstantin Katsarov | 53 | Plovdiv | "Chernata ovtsa" | ✔ | ✔ | ✔ | ✔ |

=== Episode 4 (1 October) ===
| Order | Artist | Age | Hometown | Song | Coach's and artist's choices | | | |
| Order | Artist | Age | Hometown | Song | Ivan | Dara | Maria | Miro |
|---|---|---|---|---|---|---|---|---|
| 1 | Aleksandra Georgieva | 15 | Burgas | "Vyarvay v men" | ✔ | ✔ | ✔ | ✔ |
| 2 | Rositsa Monova | 38 | Dobrich | "Nah Neh Nah" | — | — | — | — |
| 3 | Mishel | 21 | Sofia | "7 dni" | — | — | ✔ | — |
| 4 | Gergana Stoyanova | 21 | Veliko Tarnovo | "Pokrusa" | ✔ | ✔ | ✔ | ✔ |
| 5 | Martin Aleksandrov | 55 | Sofia | "I Started a Joke" | — | — | — | ✔ |
| 6 | Elena Trayanova | 22 | Sofia | "Toxic" | — | — | — | — |
| 7 | Orphy | 19 | Bucha | "Wicked Game" | ✔ | — | ✔ | ✔ |
| 8 | Georgi Georgiev | 22 | Yambol | "Don't Chain My Heart" | ✔ | ✔ | — | — |
| 9 | Georgi Dokimov | 19 | Varna | "Kum edna zhena" | — | — | — | — |
| 10 | Dona Ovcharova | 22 | Plovdiv | "I Like" | ✔ | ✔ | ✔ | — |
| 11 | Zornitsa Petrova | 36 | Sofia | "A Change Is Gonna Come" | ✔ | ✔ | ✔ | ✘ |

=== Episode 5 (8 October) ===
| Order | Artist | Age | Hometown | Song | Coach's and artist's choices | | | |
| Order | Artist | Age | Hometown | Song | Ivan | Dara | Maria | Miro |
|---|---|---|---|---|---|---|---|---|
| 1 | Dimitar Angelov | 40 | Plovdiv | "Old Time Rock and Roll" | ✔ | ✔ | ✔ | ✔ |
| 2 | Eleonora Stoyanova | 35 | Vratsa | "Umoreni krila" | ✔ | ✔ | ✔ | — |
| 3 | Margaret Georgieva | 21 | Pleven | "Damn Your Eyes" | — | — | — | — |
| 4 | Arcangelo D'Angelo | 42 | Paris | "Caruso" | ✔ | ✔ | ✔ | — |
| 5 | Aleksandr Nenov | 35 | Ruse | "You Can Leave Your Hat On" | — | — | — | — |
| 6 | Natali Nedelcheva | 19 | Burgas | "All I Want" | ✔ | — | — | ✔ |
| 7 | Emanuela Kalcheva - Djaima | 53 | Silistra | "Bésame Mucho" | ✔ | ✔ | ✔ | ✔ |
| 8 | Aleksandar Kochev | 36 | Velingrad | "Salzi" | — | — | — | — |
| 9 | Mira Popova | 16 | Troyan | "Ocean Eyes" | ✔ | ✔ | ✔ | — |
| 10 | Martin Sabkov | 25 | Mezdra | "Paradise City" | ✔ | — | — | ✔ |
| 11 | Elena Popova | 17 | Petrich | "I'll Never Love Again" | ✔ | ✘ | ✔ | ✔ |

=== Episode 6 (15 October) ===
| Order | Artist | Age | Hometown | Song | Coach's and artist's choices | | | |
| Order | Artist | Age | Hometown | Song | Ivan | Dara | Maria | Miro |
|---|---|---|---|---|---|---|---|---|
| 1 | Katrin Gacheva | 21 | Plovdiv | "I See Red" | ✔ | ✔ | ✘ | — |
| 2 | Georgi Arsov | 29 | Sofia | "Tazi pesen ne e za lyubov" | ✔ | ✔ | — | — |
| 3 | Sarai Diaz | 32 | San José de las Lajas | "SOS d'un terrien en détresse" | — | — | — | ✔ |
| 4 | Ivan Panov | 20 | Sofia | "Ah, sartse more" | — | — | — | — |
| 5 | Maria Hiteva | 51 | Karlovo | "Streshta" | ✔ | — | ✔ | — |
| 6 | Violeta Milenina | 29 | Pazardzhik | "River" | ✔ | ✔ | — | — |
| 7 | Teodor Haralmbiev | 21 | Burgas | "Ako ima ray" | — | ✔ | — | — |
| 8 | Denis Potrevaev | 28 | Mykolaiv | "Cold Heart" | ✔ | ✔ | ✔ | ✔ |
| 9 | Ivaylo Irinkov | 40 | Sliven | "Feel" | — | — | — | — |
| 10 | Ralitsa Postolova | 36 | Pernik | "Zabraneni Grad" | — | ✔ | ✔ | — |
| 11 | Nikol Antonova | 19 | Razgrad | "Teenage Fantasy" | ✔ | ✔ | ✔ | — |

- The mother of coach Maria Ilieva – Vanya Moneva made a surprise guest appearance with her chorus.

=== Episode 7 (22 October) ===
| Order | Artist | Age | Hometown | Song | Coach's and artist's choices | | | |
| Order | Artist | Age | Hometown | Song | Ivan | Dara | Maria | Miro |
|---|---|---|---|---|---|---|---|---|
| 1 | Nikolay Bakalov | 34 | Sofia | "Blurred Lines" | ✔ | ✔ | ✔ | — |
| 2 | Dani Ilieva | 17 | Karlovo | "Dihanie" | ✔ | ✔ | — | ✔ |
| 3 | Gabriela Hubenov | 25 | Plovdiv | "Love Again" | — | — | — | ✔ |
| 4 | Boyan Boyanov | 26 | Vidin | "Izvinyavay" | — | — | — | — |
| 5 | Alessandra Francesconi | — | Rieti | "Send Me an Angel" | ✔ | ✔ | — | — |
| 6 | Aleksandar Milev | 20 | Sofia | "Crazy in Love" | — | — | — | — |
| 7 | Severin Georgiev | — | Plovdiv | "Poveche" | — | ✔ | — | — |
| 8 | Maria Stefanova | 21 | Varna | "Prituri se planinata" | — | — | ✔ | ✔ |
| 9 | Kaloyan Iliev | 27 | Pleven | "Torn" | — | — | — | — |
| 10 | Ivana Nikolova | 23 | Sofia | "pov" | — | — | — | ✔ |
| 11 | Damyan Apostolov | 27 | Kočani | "Mercy" | ✔ | ✔ | ✔ | — |
| 12 | Nevena Momneva | 32 | Plovdiv | "Ne iskam" | ✔ | — | ✔ | — |
| 13 | Tea Yordanova | 18 | Dobrich | "Keeping Me Alive" | ✔ | ✔ | ✔ | — |

=== Episode 8 (28 October) ===
| Order | Artist | Age | Hometown | Song | Coach's and artist's choices | | | |
| Order | Artist | Age | Hometown | Song | Ivan | Dara | Maria | Miro |
|---|---|---|---|---|---|---|---|---|
| 1 | Mario Nikolov | 26 | Ruse | "Davam vsichko za teb" | ✔ | — | ✔ | ✔ |
| 2 | Nikoleta Sachkova | 21 | Velingrad | "Voyna" | — | — | — | — |
| 3 | Polina Aleksieva | 33 | Dobrich | "Neka vali" | — | — | ✔ | ✔ |
| 4 | Aleksandar Danev | 30 | Plovdiv | "Forget Me" | — | — | — | — |
| 5 | Ivelin Georgiev | 31 | Ruse | "Ela" | ✔ | — | — | — |
| 6 | An Nikol Ilieva | 16 | Sofia | "Love on the Brain" | — | ✔ | — | ✔ |
| 7 | Tea Miteva | 34 | Sofia | "Ironic" | — | — | — | — |
| 8 | Francesco Di Cello | — | Lamezia | "Dancing On My Own" | — | ✔ | — | — |
| 9 | Tsvetana Dicheva | 28 | Plovdiv | "Call Out My Name" | ✔ | — | ✔ | — |

- Season 1 coach Ivana, who was Miro's advisor in the battle round, made a surprise guest appearance, singing "Ah, tezi pari."

== Battles ==
The battles begin airing on November 4. The battle advisors for each coach this season were the following: season 6 and 7 coach Mihaela Fileva for Team Ivan, duo Molets for Team Dara, season 8 and 9 coach Lubo Kirov for Team Maria, and season 1 coach Ivana for Team Miro. The rule about the unlimited steal from the last season is presented, as well a new rule: each coach can save both his artists from a battle once in the whole round.

Battles color key
| Artist won the battle |
| Artist lost the battle but was stolen by another coach |
| Artist lost the battle and was stolen by another coach, but was later switched with another artist |
| Artist lost the battle and was eliminated |

Battles results
| Episode | Order | Coach | Winner | Song | Loser | 'Steal' result | | | |
| Episode | Order | Coach | Winner | Song | Loser | Ivan | Dara | Maria | Miro |
|---|---|---|---|---|---|---|---|---|---|
| Episode 9 (4 November) | 1 | Miro | Elena Popova | "Tattoo" | Orphy | ✔ | ✔ | ✔ | — |
| Episode 9 (4 November) | 2 | Dara | Katrin Gacheva | "I'd Rather Go Blind" | —N/a | — | — | — | — |
| Episode 9 (4 November) | 2 | Dara | Tea Yordanova | "I'd Rather Go Blind" | —N/a | — | — | — | — |
| Episode 9 (4 November) | 3 | Maria | Simeon Slavev | "Ne Sega" | Mira Popova | — | — | — | ✔ |
| Episode 9 (4 November) | 4 | Ivan | Kaloyan Paunov | "Come Together" | —N/a | — | — | — | — |
| Episode 9 (4 November) | 4 | Ivan | Georgi Georgiev | "Come Together" | —N/a | — | — | — | — |
| Episode 9 (4 November) | 5 | Miro | Yanitsa Kaneva | "Camino" | Boyana Karpatova | ✔ | — | — | — |
| Episode 9 (4 November) | 6 | Dara | Nikola Yanakiev | "Human" | Juliano Emilov | — | —N/a | ✔ | ✔ |
| Episode 9 (4 November) | 7 | Ivan | Zornitsa Petrova | "Chain Of Fools" | Dimitar Angelov | —N/a | — | — | — |
| Episode 9 (4 November) | 8 | Maria | Dimitrina Germanova | "Dream On" | —N/a | — | — | — | — |
| Episode 9 (4 November) | 8 | Maria | Konstantina Dimitrova | "Dream On" | —N/a | — | — | — | — |
Episode 10 (12 November)
| Episode 10 (12 November) | 1 | Miro | Denis Potrevaev | "Uptown Funk" | Boyka Shtereva | — | ✔ | ✔ | — |
| Episode 10 (12 November) | 2 | Dara | Aleksandra Georgieva | "Beneath Your Beautiful" | Teodor Haralambiev | — | —N/a | — | — |
| Episode 10 (12 November) | 3 | Ivan | Konstantin Katsarov | "Kucheto na krainiya kvartal" | Alexander Simeonov | —N/a | ✔ | — | — |
| Episode 10 (12 November) | 4 | Maria | Arika Adams | "Nobody Is Perfect" | Nikolay Bakalov | — | — | —N/a | — |
| Episode 10 (12 November) | 5 | Miro | Nadezhda Kovacheva | "Natural Woman" | —N/a | — | — | — | — |
| Episode 10 (12 November) | 5 | Miro | Pamela Megan Apsi | "Natural Woman" | —N/a | — | — | — | — |
| Episode 10 (12 November) | 6 | Dara | Severin Georgiev | "Vsichko bilo e na san" | Tsvetomira Todorova | — | —N/a | — | — |
| Episode 10 (12 November) | 7 | Ivan | Martin Sabkov | "I Wanna Be Your Slave" | Preslava Velikova | —N/a | — | — | — |
| Episode 10 (12 November) | 8 | Maria | Aleksandra Borisova | "Zlato mome" | Maria Stefanova | — | — | —N/a | ✔ |
Episode 11 (19 November)
| Episode 11 (19 November) | 1 | Maria | Polina Aleksieva | "Shook Me All Night Long" | Dona Ovcharova | — | — | —N/a | — |
| Episode 11 (19 November) | 2 | Dara | Nikol Antonova | "Lovely" | Yosif Bambin | — | —N/a | — | — |
| Episode 11 (19 November) | 3 | Miro | Martin Aleksandrov | "Phantom Of The Opera" | Sarai Diaz | — | — | — | —N/a |
| Episode 11 (19 November) | 4 | Ivan | Georgi Arsov | "Tozi film" | Gergana Stoyanova | —N/a | — | — | — |
| Episode 11 (19 November) | 5 | Dara | Valeria Voykova | "Stitches" | Alexander Kolev | ✔ | —N/a | — | ✔ |
| Episode 11 (19 November) | 6 | Miro | Dani Ilieva | "Byagstvo" | Mario Nikolov | — | — | — | —N/a |
| Episode 11 (19 November) | 7 | Ivan | Maria Koleva | "Nutbush City Limits" | Alessandra Francesconi | —N/a | — | — | — |
| Episode 11 (19 November) | 8 | Maria | Marin Rusinov | "You Raise Me Up" | Arcangelo D'Angelo | — | ✔ | —N/a | — |

== Knockouts ==
The Knockouts round began airing on November 26. This round returned from one year absence, as the Cross Battles took its place in the last season. Each team has a total of eight contestants. This season introduced a new rule to this round. Each coach will divide their 8 singers into 4 pairs. The performers from each pair will compete against each other by performing a song of their choice one after the other on stage. At the end of the two performances, it's up to the coach who will continue to the Live shows.

Knockouts color key
| Artist won the knockout and advanced to the Live Shows |
| Artist lost the knockout and was eliminated |

Knockouts results
| Episode | Order | Coach | Song | Winner | Loser | Song |
|---|---|---|---|---|---|---|
| Episode 12 (26 November) | 1 | Ivan | "Higher Love" | Zornitsa Petrova | Konstantin Katsarov | "Rok v minalo vreme" |
| Episode 12 (26 November) | 2 | Dara | "Vampire" | Valeria Voykova | Nikol Antonova | "Diamonds" |
| Episode 12 (26 November) | 3 | Maria | "Dicitencello vuje" | Aleksandra Borisova | Boyka Shtereva | "It's a Man's Man's Man's World" |
| Episode 12 (26 November) | 4 | Miro | "The Show Must Go On" | Yanitsa Kaneva | Denis Potrevaev | "Believer" |
| Episode 12 (26 November) | 5 | Ivan | "Overcome" | Georgi Georgiev | Martin Sabkov | "Whole Lotta Love" |
| Episode 12 (26 November) | 6 | Maria | "Edin nov svyat" | Marin Rusinov | Konstantina Dimitrova | "Never Enough" |
| Episode 12 (26 November) | 7 | Dara | "Bed of Roses" | Nikola Yanakiev | Severin Georgiev | "Znam" |
| Episode 12 (26 November) | 8 | Miro | "I Have Nothing" | Nadezhda Kovacheva | Dani Ilieva | "Pei sartse" |
| Episode 13 (3 December) | 1 | Dara | "Parla Piu Piano" | Arcangelo D'Angelo | Katrin Gacheva | "Wrecking Ball" |
| Episode 13 (3 December) | 2 | Miro | "Rise Up" | Elena Popova | Pamela Megan Apsi | "Kiss" |
| Episode 13 (3 December) | 3 | Ivan | "Sama" | Maria Koleva | Boyana Karpatova | "House Of The Rising Sun" |
| Episode 13 (3 December) | 4 | Maria | "Hotel Dve Zvezdi" | Simeon Slavev | Arika Adams | "No Time To Die" |
| Episode 13 (3 December) | 5 | Miro | "Say You Won't Let Go" | Alexander Kolev | Martin Aleksandrov | "God's Gonna Cut You Down" |
| Episode 13 (3 December) | 6 | Dara | "Nezavarshen Roman" | Aleksandra Georgieva | Tea Yordanova | "Liar" |
| Episode 13 (3 December) | 7 | Ivan | "Give Me Love" | Kaloyan Paunov | Georgi Arsov | "Fix You" |
| Episode 13 (3 December) | 8 | Maria | "Ne Taka" | Dimitrina Germanova | Polina Aleksieva | "I'm So Excited" |

== Live shows ==
=== Semi-final ===
The semi-final aired on 10 December. A total of 16 contestants who advanced from the knockout round performed in this round. Voting was solely for the artists, henceforth coaches were not guaranteed to have an artist representing his/her team in the Finale.

In the end, six artists from the public's vote were through to the finale. For the second time in the entire history of the show, a coach (Ivan Lechev) has no contestants advancing to the Final, with the previous occurrence being Lubo Kirov's team in the eighth season.

Semi-final color key
| Artist advanced to the finale from the public's vote |
| Artist was eliminated |

Semi-final results
| Order | Coach | Artist | Song | Result |
|---|---|---|---|---|
| 1 | Maria | Aleksandra Borisova | "Mamma Knows Best" | Eliminated |
| 2 | Miro | Alexander Kolev | "Rana" | Eliminated |
| 3 | Ivan | Zornitsa Petrova | "I Want to Know What Love Is" | Eliminated |
| 4 | Ivan | Georgi Georgiev | "You Give Love a Bad Name" | Eliminated |
| 5 | Dara | Valeria Voykova | "Skyfall" | Eliminated |
| 6 | Miro | Yanitsa Kaneva | "Zaidi zaidi" | Eliminated |
| 7 | Ivan | Maria Koleva | "I'm Every Woman" | Eliminated |
| 8 | Maria | Marin Rusinov | "Sbogom" | Eliminated |
| 9 | Dara | Nikola Yanakiev | "Heaven" | Advanced |
| 10 | Miro | Nadezhda Kovacheva | "Let It Be" | Advanced |
| 11 | Dara | Aleksandra Georgieva | "I Was Made for Lovin' You" | Eliminated |
| 12 | Maria | Simeon Slavev | "Everytime" | Advanced |
| 13 | Miro | Elena Popova | "Galabo" | Advanced |
| 14 | Ivan | Kaloyan Paunov | "Valerie" | Eliminated |
| 15 | Maria | Dimitrina Germanova | "Varvyat li dvama" | Advanced |
| 16 | Dara | Arcangelo D'Angelo | "Ederlezi" | Advanced |

=== Final ===
Final results
| Round | Order | Coach | Artist | Song | Result |
|---|---|---|---|---|---|
| One (Duet with guest) | 1 | Maria | Simeon Slavev (with Grafa) | "Nikoi" | Fifth place |
| One (Duet with guest) | 2 | Miro | Elena Popova (with Orlin Pavlov) | "Shallow" | Top 4 |
| One (Duet with guest) | 3 | Dara | Nikola Yanakiev (with Dara Ekimova) | "I Don't Want to Miss a Thing" | Top 4 |
| One (Duet with guest) | 4 | Maria | Dimitrina Germanova (with Vladimir Mihaylov) | "Who Wants to Live Forever" | Top 4 |
| One (Duet with guest) | 5 | Dara | Arcangelo D'Angelo (with Anelia) | "Zavinagi" | Sixth place |
| One (Duet with guest) | 6 | Miro | Nadezhda Kovacheva (with Magi Djanavarova) | "Listen" | Top 4 |
| Two (Song by the contestant's choice) | 1 | Maria | Dimitrina Germanova | "Chast ot tvoyat svyat" | Top 2 |
| Two (Song by the contestant's choice) | 2 | Dara | Nikola Yanakiev | "Sorry Seems to Be the Hardest Word" | Fourth Place |
| Two (Song by the contestant's choice) | 3 | Miro | Elena Popova | "My Immortal" | Third place |
| Two (Song by the contestant's choice) | 4 | Miro | Nadezhda Kovacheva | "Desert Rose" | Top 2 |
| Three (Song by the public's choice) | 1 | Maria | Dimitrina Germanova | "The Winner Takes It All" | Runner-up |
| Three (Song by the public's choice) | 2 | Miro | Nadezhda Kovacheva | "All by Myself" | Winner |

== Elimination chart ==
Artist's info

- Team Ivan
- Team Dara
- Team Maria
- Team Miro

Result details

- Winner
- Runner-up
- Third place
- Fourth place
- Fifth place
- Sixth place
- Saved by the public
- Eliminated

Results per week
| Artists | Week 1 Semi-final | Week 2 Final |
|---|---|---|
| Nadezhda Kovacheva | Safe | Winner |
| Dimitrina Germanova | Safe | Runner-up |
| Elena Popova | Safe | Third place |
| Nikola Yanakiev | Safe | Fourth place |
| Simeon Slavev | Safe | Fifth place |
| Arcangelo D'Angelo | Safe | Sixth place |
| Aleksandra Borisova | Eliminated | Eliminated (Week 1) |
| Alexander Kolev | Eliminated | Eliminated (Week 1) |
| Zornitsa Petrova | Eliminated | Eliminated (Week 1) |
| Georgi Georgiev | Eliminated | Eliminated (Week 1) |
| Valeria Voykova | Eliminated | Eliminated (Week 1) |
| Yanitsa Kaneva | Eliminated | Eliminated (Week 1) |
| Maria Koleva | Eliminated | Eliminated (Week 1) |
| Marin Rusinov | Eliminated | Eliminated (Week 1) |
| Aleksandra Georgieva | Eliminated | Eliminated (Week 1) |
| Kaloyan Paunov | Eliminated | Eliminated (Week 1) |

=== Per team ===
| Artists | Week 1 Cross Battles | Week 2 Grand Final |
|---|---|---|
| Zornitsa Petrova | Eliminated | |
| Georgi Georgiev | Eliminated | |
| Maria Koleva | Eliminated | |
| Kaloyan Paunov | Eliminated | |
| Nikola Yanakiev | Safe | Fourth place |
| Arcangelo D'Angelo | Safe | Sixth place |
| Aleksandra Georgieva | Eliminated | |
| Valeria Voykova | Eliminated | |
| Dimitrina Germanova | Safe | Runner-up |
| Simeon Slavev | Safe | Fifth place |
| Aleksandra Borisova | Eliminated | |
| Marin Rusinov | Eliminated | |
| Nadezhda Kovacheva | Safe | Winner |
| Elena Popova | Safe | Third place |
| Alexander Kolev | Eliminated | |
| Yanitsa Kaneva | Eliminated | |
