= Glasat na Bulgaria season 8 =

Glasat na Bulgaria
- Season 8
- Promotional poster featuring coaches Ivan Lechev, Galena, Dara and Lubo Kirov
- Hosted by: Ivan Tishev; Alexandra Bogdanska (backstage)
- Coaches: Ivan Lechev; Dara; Galena; Lubo Kirov
- Winner: Petya Paneva
- Winning coach: Galena
- Runner-up: Georgi Kostadinov

Release
- Original network: bTV
- Original release: 12 September – 12 December 2021

Season chronology
- ← Previous; Season 7 Next → Season 9

The eighth season of Bulgarian reality singing competition Glasat na Bulgaria premiered on 12 September 2021 and broadcasts every 20:00, at bTV. For this season, Ivan Lechev returned for his coaching duties for the fifth time, and three new coaches were announced, who include Lubo Kirov, Galena, and Dara who will replace Grafa, Kamelia and Mihaela Fileva.

Petya Paneva was crowned as the "voice", marking Galena's first win as a coach. This is the third time that a first-time coach wins their first season (first being Desi Slava on season three, and then Ivan Lechev on season four). The top two, Petya Paneva and Georgi Kostadinov, were both from Galena's team, marking the first time this has happened in any season. This was also the first time where the first contestant to audition went on to win the season.

== Coaches and hosts ==
Coaches for Glasat na Bulgaria season eight

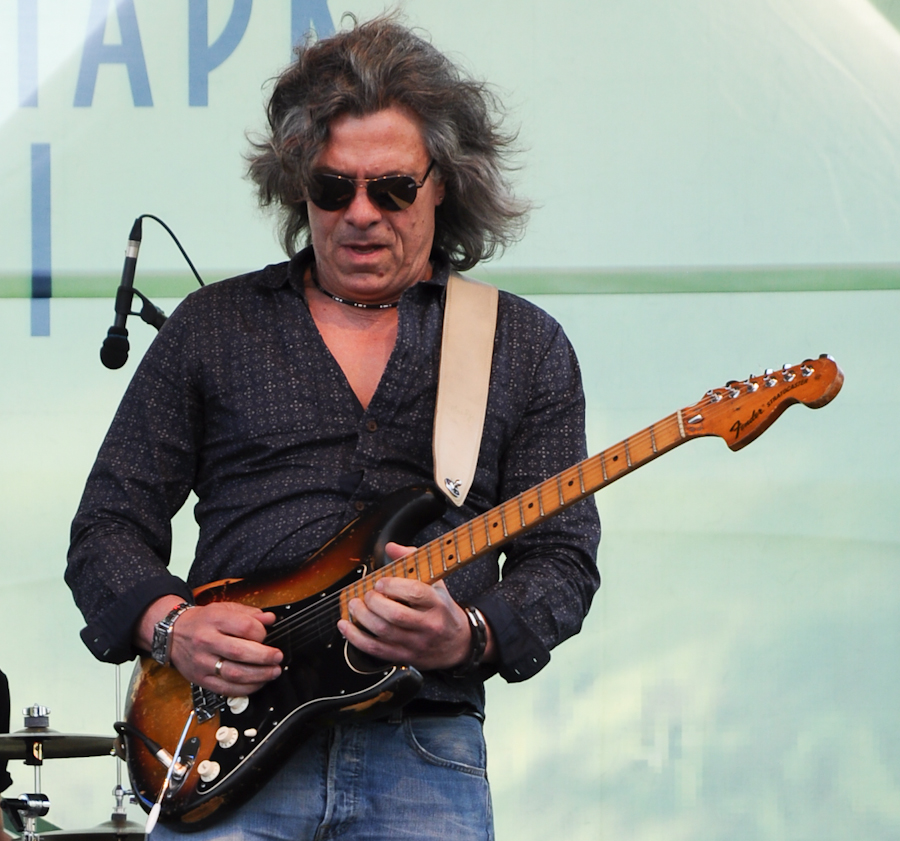
Ivan Lechev

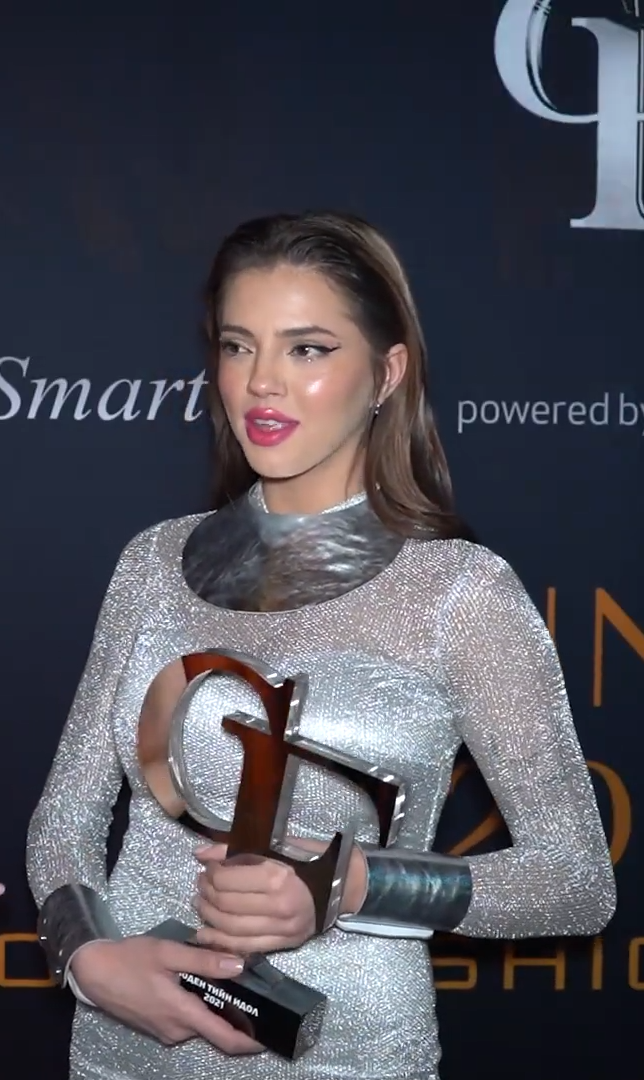
Dara

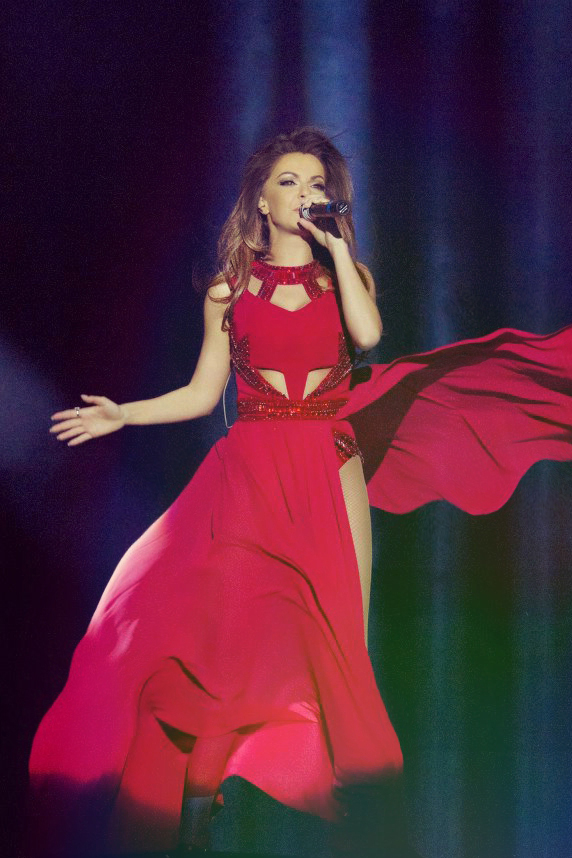
Galena

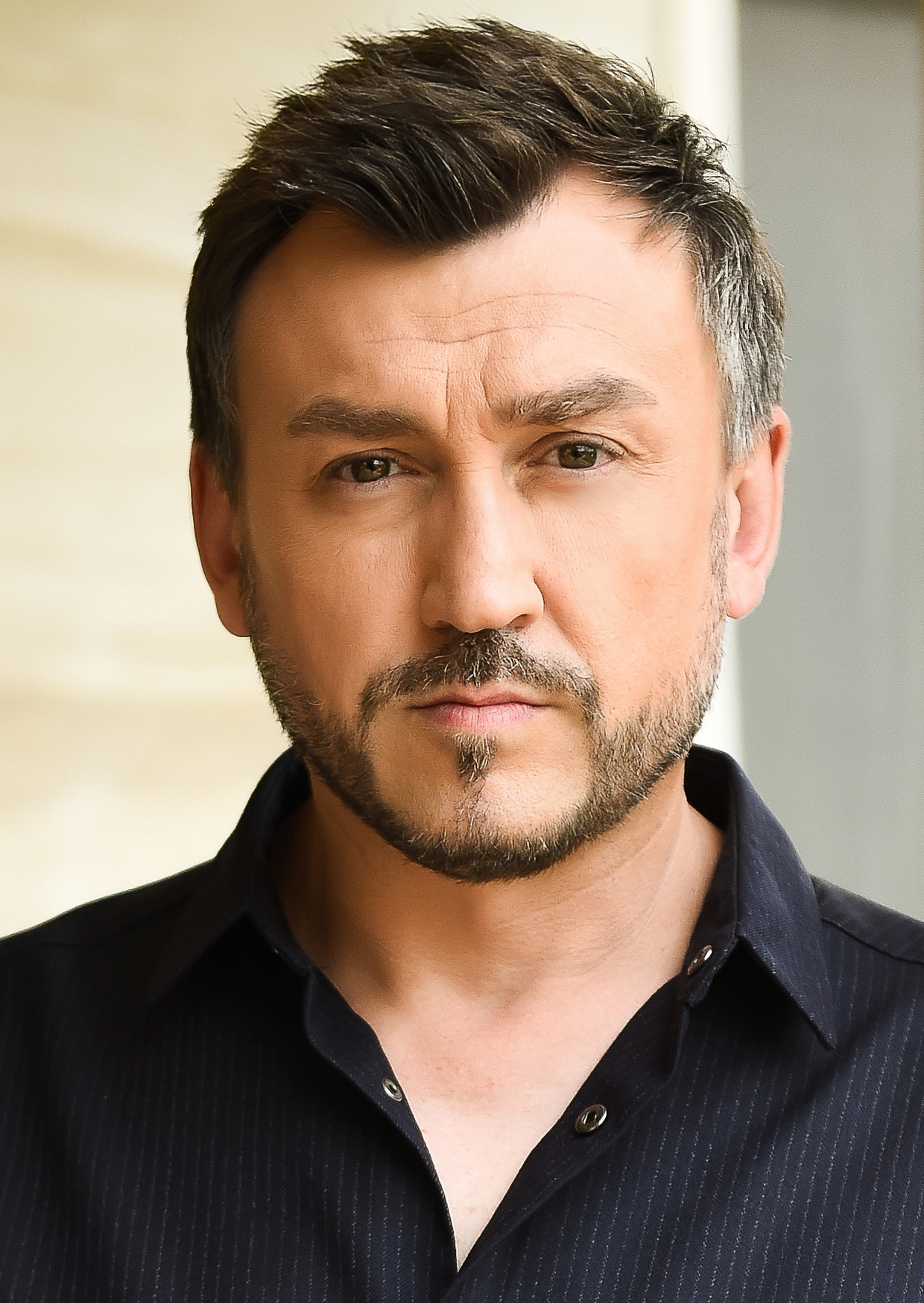
Lubo Kirov

In June 2021, bTV announced the return of the musical competition show. Of the four coaches of the previous season, only Ivan Lechev returned, marking his fifth season as a coach. Debuting coaches Dara, Galena, and Lubo Kirov were announced, replacing Mihaela Fileva, Kamelia and Grafa. Kamelia was supposed to return for her fifth time as a coach but opted not to return on the show.

After the announcement of new coaches, Ivan Tishev took the hosting responsibility, replacing Pavell and Venci Venc' who were hosts for the last four seasons. Also, Alexandra Bogdanska served as backstage host for her second season.

== Production ==
The filming of Glasat na Bulgaria started on July, at bTV studios. Unlike previous seasons, audiences are reduced from its full capacity to maintain social distancing as a result of COVID-19 pandemic.

== Teams ==
- Winner
- Runner-up
- Third place
- Fourth place
- Fifth place
- Sixth place
- Eliminated in the Live Cross Battles
- Eliminated in the Knockouts
- Stolen in the Battles
- Eliminated in the Battles
- Eliminated in the Final selection
- Withdrew

Coaching teams
Coaches	Top 70 Artists				
Ivan Lechev					
Ivan Lechev	Boris Hristov	Raya Dimitrova	Ivan E. Ivanov	Aleksey Kozarev	Boyan Shahov
Ivan Lechev	Hristo Danailov	Kristiyan Varbanovski	Richard Mantarliev	~~Ivailo Ranov-Sheki~~	~~Georgi Kostadinov~~
Ivan Lechev	Ilin Iliev	Preslava Krasteva	Spas Lefterov	Floralyn Georgieva	Stefka Emilova
Ivan Lechev	Iva Ralcheva	Trendafil Bubanov	Andon Andonov		
Dara					
Dara	Lidiya Ganeva	Daniel Staykov	Hristina Yosifova	Desislava Hristova	Gabriela Koleva
Dara	Boryana Georgieva	Nikolai Timenov	Viktoriya Glavcheva	Tonina Mitinska	Daliya Vrana
Dara	Martin Akinremi	Nora Cherneva	Ginka Vladimirova	Kieran Smith	Natassa Andreou
Dara	Gyokchan Ismailov	Yana & Nikolay Stoyanchevski			
Galena					
Galena	Petya Paneva	Georgi Kostadinov	Ekaterina Sava	Dimitar Kolev	Hristina Raleva
Galena	Ivelina Andreeva	Volena Apostolova	Galya Georgieva	~~Viktoriya Glavcheva~~	Vasilia Petrova
Galena	Nadezhda Panayotova	Victoria Zafirova	Moyra Yankova	Aleksandar Trifonov	Martin Nikolov
Galena	Christopher Galovski	Sandra Tsvetanova	Mahrez Hachemi	Marin Gerchev	Teodora Marcheva
Galena	Irena & Alexander Gospodinovi				
Lubo Kirov					
Lubo Kirov	Ivan T. Ivanov	Stefan Zdravković	Jamie Rashed	Atanaska & Sonay	Ivailo Ranov-Sheki
Lubo Kirov	Hrisi Pachalova	Polina Nikolova	Elena Kokorska	~~Hristo Danailov~~	Anton Markov
Lubo Kirov	Simona Krasteva	Yoan Piperov	Konstantin Tomov	Simona Bakalova	Stiliana Dimitrova
Lubo Kirov	Stanimir Marinov	Denden Samsuhendar	Daniela Ivanova		
Note: Italicized names are stolen artists (names struck through within former teams).

== Blind auditions ==
In this season, coaches complete their teams without a specific number of members. However, each one will be cut down to 14 contestants, on the last episode of the blinds. In addition to the season, each coach is given two blocks to use during the auditions.

The "final selection" follows right after the blind auditions. Coaches would finalize the number of artists on their team by choosing, randomly, 14 artists to proceed to the next stage. Artists chosen by their respective coach will proceed to the next round, the Battles, while the unselected ones will be eliminated.

Blind auditions color key
✔	Coach pressed "I WANT YOU" button
	Artist joined this coach's team
	Artist selected to join this coach's team
	Artist was eliminated as no coach pressed their button
	Artist was, initially, part of the team but was eliminated on the cut round
✘	Coach pressed "I WANT YOU" button, but was:
	Blocked by Ivan; Blocked by Dara; Blocked by Galena; Blocked by Lubo

=== Episode 1 (September 12) ===
Order	Artist	Age	Hometown	Song	Coach's and artist's choices			
Order	Artist	Age	Hometown	Song	Ivan	Dara	Galena	Lubo
1	Petya Paneva	21	Varna	"Avram Zornitsa dumashe"	✔	✔	✔	✔
2	Boris Hristov	40	Sofia	"Human"	✔	✔	✔	✔
3	Daniel Staykov	22	Shumen	"Otherside"	✘	✔	✔	✔
4	Simona Bakalova	18	Stara Zagora	"Ta-ri-ri-ram"	✘	✔	✔	✔
5	Temenuzhka Samuilova	22	Krupnik	"Bez teb"	—	—	—	—
6	Ivan T. Ivanov	20	Parvomay	"Afterglow"	✔	✔	✔	✔
7	Ekaterina Sava	—	Pleven	"One Night Only"	✔	✔	✔	✔
8	Bozhidar Nedyalkov	27	Sofia	"Say Something"	—	—	—	—
9	Jamie Rashed	32	Sofia	"Black Hole Sun"	✔	✔	✔	✔
10	Slavina Dumbalska	23	Sofia	"Break My Heart"	—	—	—	—
11	Richard Mantarliev	44	Plovdiv	"Bridge to Better Days"	✔	✔	✔	✔
12	Lidiya Ganeva	15	Plovdiv	"Drivers License"	✔	✔	✔	✔

=== Episode 2 (September 19) ===
Order	Artist	Age	Hometown	Song	Coach's and artist's choices			
Order	Artist	Age	Hometown	Song	Ivan	Dara	Galena	Lubo
1	Hristina Yosifova	16	Sofia	"Summertime"	✔	✔	✔	✘
2	Hristo Danailov	34	Plovdiv	"Billie Jean"	✔	✔	✔	✔
3	Emilia Valenti & Veselin Vachev	38 & 42	Plovdiv	"Molya se"	—	—	—	—
4	Martin Nikolov	28	Lovech	"Make It Rain"	✔	✔	✔	✔
5	Preslava Krasteva	31	Gorna Oryahovitsa	"Chainsmoking"	✔	✔	✔	✔
6	Dmitro Dudnik	29	Ukraine	"Trouble"	—	—	—	—
7	Boryana Georgieva	54	Varna	"Get the Party Started"	✔	✔	✔	✔
8	Christopher Galovski	25	Knezha	"Da si tuk"	—	✔	✔	✔
9	Yana Stoyanova	20	Varna	"Mercy"	—	—	—	—
10	Yoan Piperov	15	Pleven	"Blackbird"	✔	✔	✔	✔
11	Dimitar Kolev	25	Stara Zagora	"Back to Black"	✔	✔	✔	✔
12	Elena Kokorska	32	Sofia	"I Believe I Can Fly"	✔	—	✔	✔
13	Georgi Kostadinov	34	Dobrich	"A Song for You"	✔	✔	✔	✔

=== Episode 3 (September 26) ===
Order	Artist	Age	Hometown	Song	Coach's and artist's choices			
Order	Artist	Age	Hometown	Song	Ivan	Dara	Galena	Lubo
1	Boyan Shahov	34	Sofia	"T.N.T"	✔	✔	✔	✔
2	Victoria Zafirova	29	Sofia	"I See Red"	✔	✔	✔	✔
3	Moyra Yankova	17	Varna	"Dance Monkey"	—	—	✔	—
4	Martin Akinremi	32	Stara Zagora	"Us"	✔	✔	✔	✘
5	Trendafil Bubanov	—	Pazardzhik	"It's Not Unusual"	✔	—	—	—
6	Yana Obretenova	20	Dobrich	"Mr. Magic"	—	—	—	—
7	Sandra Tsvetanova	19	Pernik	"You Are the Reason"	✔	✔	✔	✔
8	Vera Ruso	33	Plovdiv	"Toca's Miracle"	—	—	—	—
9	Konstantin Tomov	29	Sofia	"Jesus Is the Answer"	✔	✔	—	✔
10	Kieron Smith	29	Liverpool, England	"Believe"	✔	✔	✔	✔
11	Aleksandar Mladenov	28	Sofia	"Zitti e buoni"	—	—	—	—
12	Polina Nikolova	34	Varna	"Part of Your World"	✔	✔	✔	✔
13	Ivailo Ranov-Sheki	47	Sofia	"Black Dog"	✔	✔	✔	✘

=== Episode 4 (October 3) ===
Order	Artist	Age	Hometown	Song	Coach's and artist's choices			
Order	Artist	Age	Hometown	Song	Ivan	Dara	Galena	Lubo
1	Volena Apostolova	22	Ruse	"I Never Loved a Man"	✔	✔	✔	✔
2	Stefan Zdravković	27	Vranje, Serbia	"Pillowtalk"	✔	✔	✘	✔
3	Gabriela Zhivkova	17	Shumen	"Ne, Merci"	—	—	—	—
4	Galya Georgieva	47	Varna	"Holding Out for a Hero"	—	—	✔	✔
5	Kristiyan Varbanovski	18	Sofia	"Location"	✔	—	—	✔
6	Yordan Ivanchev	36	Sofia	"I've Got a Woman"	—	—	—	—
7	Desislava Hristova	31	Sofia	"All I Ask"	✔	✔	✔	✔
8	Vasilia Petrova	18	Kyustendil	"Beli Noshti"	✔	✔	✔	✔
9	Ivan Ivanov	39	Stara Zagora	"Gethsemane"	✔	—	—	✔
10	Natasa Andreu	25	Cyprus	"Cry Me a River"	—	✔	—	—
11	Mert Yaldaz	23	Kardzhali	"Elveda Deme Bana"	—	—	—	—
12	Raya Dimitrova	16	Sofia	"Bad"	✔	✘	✔	✔
13	Atanaska & Sonay	22	Parvomay & Velingrad	"Someone You Loved"	✔	✔	✔	✔

=== Episode 5 (October 10) ===
Order	Artist	Age	Hometown	Song	Coach's and artist's choices			
Order	Artist	Age	Hometown	Song	Ivan	Dara	Galena	Lubo
1	Aleksey Kozarev	28	Bolhrad, Ukraine	"I'm Still Standing"	✔	✔	✔	✔
2	Hristina Raleva	40	Plovdiv	"The Edge of Glory"	✔	✔	✔	✔
3	Stiliana Dimitrova	32	Prague, Czech Republic	"Leave The Door Open"	✔	✔	✔	✔
4	Gyokchan Ismailov	28	Studenets	"Zashto Dobrite Stradat"	—	✔	—	—
5	Emin Al Juneid	19	Sofia	"Znam"	—	—	—	—
6	Teodora Marcheva	21	Sofia	"The Magic Flute / Tough Lover"	✔	—	✔	—
7	Daliya Vrana	17	Sofia	"Best Part"	—	✔	✔	✔
8	Georgi Iliev	21	Varna	"Mamma Knows Best"	—	—	—	—
9	Floralyn Georgieva	25	Sofia	"When The Party's Over"	✔	—	—	—
10	Denden Samsuhendar	36	Bandung, Indonesia	"She's Gone"	✔	✔	✔	✔
11	Irena & Alexander Gospodinovi	32 & 33	Bansko & Nova Zagora	"Zavinagi"	—	—	✔	✔
12	Boyan Todorov	19	Plovdiv	"Dream a Little Dream of Me"	—	—	—	—
13	Nora Cherneva	30	Ruse	"Tears Of Gold"	✔	✔	✔	✔
14	Hrisi Pachalova	21	Vratsa	"Ne Iskam"	—	—	✔	✔

=== Episode 6 (October 17) ===
Order	Artist	Age	Hometown	Song	Coach's and artist's choices			
Order	Artist	Age	Hometown	Song	Ivan	Dara	Galena	Lubo
1	Ivelina Andreeva	19	Glogovo	"Pesen na Chervenata Shapchitsa"	✔	✔	✔	✔
2	Andon Andonov	48	Ihtiman	"Sad but True"	✔	—	✔	✔
3	Daniela Ivanova	16	Dolni Chiflik	"Strah ot Samota"	✔	—	✔	✔
4	Dimitar Timenov	30	Plovdiv	"Say You Won't Let Go"	—	—	—	—
5	Nikolay Timenov	25	Plovdiv	"Monster"	✔	✔	✔	✔
6	Dimitar Stoyanov	17	Dupnitsa	"Chuzhdi Tela"	—	—	—	—
7	Marin Gerchev	38	Shumen	"Imam Ljubav Ali Kome Da Je Dam"	—	—	✔	—
8	Iva Ralcheva	42	Varna	"I'll Be Your Shelter"	✔	—	—	✔
9	Stanimir Marinov	30	Dobrich	"Nyakoga Predi"	—	✔	✔	✔
10	Marta Kukularova	42	Plovdiv	"Love Of My Life"	—	—	—	—
11	Mahrez Hachemi	33	Algiers, Algeria	"Katerino Mome"	✔	—	✔	—
12	Ivona Georgieva	16	Sofia	"Momiche Ot Led"	—	—	—	—
13	Ilin Iliev	28	Plovdiv	"My Babe"	✔	—	✔	✔
14	Gabriela Koleva	22	Varna	"Juice"	✔	✔	✔	✘
15	Ginka Vladimirova	54	Novi Pazar	"V Bezkraynostta"	—	✔	—	✔

=== Episode 7 (October 24) ===
Medi appeared as a guest performer with his song "Da si tuk" at the end of the auditions.

Order	Artist	Age	Hometown	Song	Coach's and artist's choices			
Order	Artist	Age	Hometown	Song	Ivan	Dara	Galena	Lubo
1	Stefka Emilova	36	Targovishte	"Try"	✔	—	✔	✔
2	Aleksandar Trifonov	27	Sofia	"Samo Mene Nyamash"	✔	✔	✔	✔
3	Tonina Mitinska	18	Vratsa	"Nobody's Perfect"	—	✔	—	—
4	Aleksandar Aleksandrov	19	Varna	"Peaches"	—	—	—	—
5	Simona Krasteva	17	Sofia	"Canção do Mar"	✔	—	✔	✔
6	Spas Lefterov	26	Gotse Delchev	"Sbogom"	✔	—	—	—
7	Yana & Nikolay Stoyanchevi	28 & 26	Stara Zagora	"Little Talks"	—	✔	—	—
8	Viktoriya Glavcheva	21	Hisarya	"Don't You Worry 'bout a Thing"	—	✔	✔	✔
9	Anton Markov	18	Elin Pelin	"Circles"	—	—	—	✔
10	Yoana Hristova	20	Sofia	"Ne Me Obichash Veche"	—	—	—	—
11	Nadezhda Panayotova	41	Varna	"Slagam Kray"	—	—	✔	—

== Battles ==
The battles round begin airing on October 31. The battle advisers for this season are the following: Maria Ilieva (future coach in season 10-11) for Team Lubo, season 3 coach Atanas Penev for Team Ivan, Doni for Team Dara, Medi (future coach in season 12) and Georgi Simeonov for Team Galena.

Each coach is entitled to one "steal" throughout the battles (as in season 6) to save a losing contestant. At the end of the battles, eight contestants (seven winning and one stolen artists) will remain on each team, advancing through to the Knockouts.

Battles color key
Artist won the Battle and advanced to the Knockouts
Artist lost the Battle, but was stolen by another coach and advanced to the Knockouts
Artist lost the Battle and was eliminated

Battles results
Episode	Order	Coach	Winner	Song	Loser	'Steal' result			
Episode	Order	Coach	Winner	Song	Loser	Ivan	Dara	Galena	Lubo
Episode 8 (Sunday, October 31)	1	Dara	Hristina Yosifova	"And I Am Telling You I'm Not Going"	Natassa Andreou	—	—N/a	—	—
Episode 8 (Sunday, October 31)	2	Ivan	Ivan E. Ivanov	"Welcome to the Jungle"	Stefka Emilova	—N/a	—	—	—
Episode 8 (Sunday, October 31)	3	Lubo	Polina Nikolova	"Speechless"	Simona Bakalova	—	—	—	—N/a
Episode 8 (Sunday, October 31)	4	Galena	Galya Georgieva	"It's My Life"	Martin Nikolov	—	—	—N/a	—
Episode 8 (Sunday, October 31)	5	Dara	Daniel Staykov	"Beggin"	Kieran Smith	—	—N/a	—	—
Episode 8 (Sunday, October 31)	6	Ivan	Raya Dimitrova	"“Déjà vu”?"	Floralyn Georgieva	—N/a	—	—	—
Episode 8 (Sunday, October 31)	7	Galena	Volena Apostolova	"Bang Bang"	Viktoriya Glavcheva	—	✔	—N/a	—
Episode 8 (Sunday, October 31)	8	Lubo	Stefan Zdravković	"If I Ain't Got You"	Stiliana Dimitrova	—	Team full	—	—N/a
Episode 8 (Sunday, October 31)	9	Dara	Boryana Georgieva	"Arlekino"	Ginka Vladimirova	—	Team full	—	—
Episode 8 (Sunday, October 31)	10	Galena	Ivelina Andreeva	"Zhiva Rana"	Aleksandar Trifonov	—	Team full	—N/a	—
Episode 8 (Sunday, October 31)	11	Ivan	Boris Hristov	"Bruises"	Georgi Kostadinov	—N/a	Team full	✔	✔
Episode 9 (Sunday, November 7)	1	Ivan	Boyan Shahov	"We're Not Gonna Take It"	Ivailo Ranov-Sheki	—N/a	Team full	Team full	✔
Episode 9 (Sunday, November 7)	2	Dara	Desislava Hristova	"Midnight Sky"	Nora Cherneva	—	Team full	Team full	Team full
Episode 9 (Sunday, November 7)	3	Lubo	Jamie Rashed	"You Oughta Know"	Hristo Danailov	✔	Team full	Team full	Team full
Episode 9 (Sunday, November 7)	4	Galena	Ekaterina Sava	"Hello"	Moyra Yankova	Team full	Team full	Team full	Team full
Episode 9 (Sunday, November 7)	5	Ivan	Aleksey Kozarev	"Za tebe byah"	Spas Lefterov	Team full	Team full	Team full	Team full
Episode 9 (Sunday, November 7)	6	Dara	Nikolay Timenov	"Watermelon Sugar"	Martin Akinremi	Team full	Team full	Team full	Team full
Episode 9 (Sunday, November 7)	7	Lubo	Elena Kokorska	"Anywhere Away from Here"	Konstantin Tomov	Team full	Team full	Team full	Team full
Episode 9 (Sunday, November 7)	8	Ivan	Kristiyan Varbanovski	"Dusk Till Dawn"	Preslava Krasteva	Team full	Team full	Team full	Team full
Episode 9 (Sunday, November 7)	9	Lubo	Hrisi Pachalova	"Malkiyat Princ"	Yoan Piperov	Team full	Team full	Team full	Team full
Episode 9 (Sunday, November 7)	10	Galena	Hristina Raleva	"Chernata Ovca"	Victoria Zafirova	Team full	Team full	Team full	Team full
Episode 9 (Sunday, November 7)	11	Dara	Lidiya Ganeva	"Lovely"	Daliya Vrana	Team full	Team full	Team full	Team full
Episode 10 (Monday, November 15)	1	Lubo	Atanaska and Sonay	"Arcade"	Simona Krasteva	Team full	Team full	Team full	Team full
Episode 10 (Monday, November 15)	2	Ivan	Richard Mantarliev	"No Good"	Ilin Iliev	Team full	Team full	Team full	Team full
Episode 10 (Monday, November 15)	3	Dara	Gabriela Koleva	"Bust Your Windows"	Tonina Mitinska	Team full	Team full	Team full	Team full
Episode 10 (Monday, November 15)	4	Galena	Dimitar Kolev	"Always Remember Us This Way"	Nadezhda Panayotova	Team full	Team full	Team full	Team full
Episode 10 (Monday, November 15)	5	Lubo	Ivan T. Ivanov	"Before You Go"	Anton Markov	Team full	Team full	Team full	Team full
Episode 10 (Monday, November 15)	6	Galena	Petya Paneva	"Rufinka bolna legnala"	Vasilia Petrova	Team full	Team full	Team full	Team full

== Knockouts ==
The Knockouts round begins airing on November 21. Ishtar is the Mega mentor for all teams in this phase. Each team has a total of eight contestants, and three will be chosen by their coach to go through to the Live shows. During this round, Galena has only seven artists to perform due to Galya Georgieva's withdrawal from the show.

Knockouts color key
Artist was given a chair and advanced to the Live shows
Artist was eliminated after being switched in favor of another artist
Artist was eliminated automatically

Knockouts results
Episode	Coach	Order	Artist	Song	Chair given	Artist removed	Final result
Episode 11 (November 21)	Dara	1	Hristina Yosifova	"A Woman's Worth"	1	—	Advanced
Episode 11 (November 21)	Dara	2	Nikolai Timenov	"Legendary"	2	—	Eliminated
Episode 11 (November 21)	Dara	3	Viktoriya Glavcheva	"Alive"	3	—	Eliminated
Episode 11 (November 21)	Dara	4	Desislava Hristova	"Yesterday"	2	Viktoriya Glavcheva	Eliminated
Episode 11 (November 21)	Dara	5	Boryana Georgieva	"Cabaret"	3	Nikolai Timenov	Eliminated
Episode 11 (November 21)	Dara	6	Gabriela Koleva	"Barbie Girl"	3	Boryana Georgieva	Eliminated
Episode 11 (November 21)	Dara	7	Daniel Staykov	"Crawling"	2	Gabriela Koleva	Advanced
Episode 11 (November 21)	Dara	8	Lidiya Ganeva	"Jealous"	1	Desislava Hristova	Advanced
Episode 11 (November 21)	Lubo	1	Jamie Rashed	"Hard to Handle"	1	—	Advanced
Episode 11 (November 21)	Lubo	2	Elena Kokorska	"Higher Ground"	2	—	Eliminated
Episode 11 (November 21)	Lubo	3	Ivan T. Ivanov	"Falling"	1	—	Advanced
Episode 11 (November 21)	Lubo	4	Stefan Zdravković	"When A Man Loves A Woman"	3	Elena Kokorska	Advanced
Episode 11 (November 21)	Lubo	5	Polina Nikolova	"I'm Alive"	Not given	—	Eliminated
Episode 11 (November 21)	Lubo	6	Hrisi Pachalova	"Edin Sreshtu Drug"	Not given	—	Eliminated
Episode 11 (November 21)	Lubo	7	Ivailo Ranov-Sheki	"Still of the Night"	Not given	—	Eliminated
Episode 11 (November 21)	Lubo	8	Atanaska & Sonay	"Imenno Ti"	Not given	—	Eliminated
Episode 12 (November 28)	Galena	1	Volena Apostolova	"Work It Out"	1	—	Eliminated
Episode 12 (November 28)	Galena	2	Ivelina Andreeva	"Lazha e"	2	—	Eliminated
Episode 12 (November 28)	Galena	3	Dimitar Kolev	"It's A Sin"	3	—	Eliminated
Episode 12 (November 28)	Galena	4	Ekaterina Sava	"Free Your Mind"	1	Dimitar Kolev	Advanced
Episode 12 (November 28)	Galena	5	Hristina Raleva	"Ain't Nobody"	2	Ivelina Andreeva	Eliminated
Episode 12 (November 28)	Galena	6	Georgi Kostadinov	"Po Parvi Petli"	2	Volena Apostolova	Advanced
Episode 12 (November 28)	Galena	7	Petya Paneva	"Ya Izgrey, Izgrey"	1	Hristina Raleva	Advanced
Episode 12 (November 28)	Ivan	1	Richard Mantarliev	"Freedom"	1	—	Eliminated
Episode 12 (November 28)	Ivan	2	Aleksey Kozarev	"Diamonds"	2	—	Eliminated
Episode 12 (November 28)	Ivan	3	Hristo Danailov	"To Be With You"	3	—	Eliminated
Episode 12 (November 28)	Ivan	4	Raya Dimitrova	"Toxic"	1	Hristo Danailov	Advanced
Episode 12 (November 28)	Ivan	5	Boyan Shahov	"Ti Uzhasno Zakasnya"	2	Aleksey Kozarev	Eliminated
Episode 12 (November 28)	Ivan	6	Kristiyan Varbanovski	"Tout l'univers"	3	Richard Mantarliev	Eliminated
Episode 12 (November 28)	Ivan	7	Boris Hristov	"Leave a Light On"	1	Kristiyan Varbanovski	Advanced
Episode 12 (November 28)	Ivan	8	Ivan E. Ivanov	"Prikazka"	2	Boyan Shahov	Advanced

Detailed chairs' changes – Moved to another chair – Eliminated
Coach	Order	Chair 1	Chair 2	Chair 3
Dara's team	3	Hristina Yosifova	Nikolai Timenov	Viktoriya Glavcheva
Dara's team	4	Hristina Yosifova	Desislava Hristova	Nikolai Timenov
Dara's team	5	Hristina Yosifova	Desislava Hristova	Boryana Georgieva
Dara's team	6	Hristina Yosifova	Desislava Hristova	Gabriela Koleva
Dara's team	7	Hristina Yosifova	Daniel Staykov	Desislava Hristova
Dara's team	8	Lidiya Ganeva	Hristina Yosifova	Daniel Staykov
Lubo's team	3	Ivan T. Ivanov	Jamie Rashed	Elena Kokorska
Lubo's team	4	Ivan T. Ivanov	Jamie Rashed	Stefan Zdravković
Galena's team	3	Volena Apostolova	Ivelina Andreeva	Dimitar Kolev
Galena's team	4	Ekaterina Sava	Volena Apostolova	Ivelina Andreeva
Galena's team	5	Ekaterina Sava	Hristina Raleva	Volena Apostolova
Galena's team	6	Ekaterina Sava	Georgi Kostadinov	Hristina Raleva
Galena's team	7	Petya Paneva	Ekaterina Sava	Georgi Kostadinov
Ivan's team	3	Richard Mantarliev	Aleksey Kozarev	Hristo Danailov
Ivan's team	4	Raya Dimitrova	Richard Mantarliev	Aleksey Kozarev
Ivan's team	5	Raya Dimitrova	Boyan Shahov	Richard Mantarliev
Ivan's team	6	Raya Dimitrova	Boyan Shahov	Kristiyan Varbanovski
Ivan's team	7	Boris Hristov	Raya Dimitrova	Boyan Shahov
Ivan's team	8	Boris Hristov	Ivan E. Ivanov	Raya Dimitrova

== Live shows ==
=== Episode 13: Cross Battles (December 5) ===
Cross Battles were broadcast on December 5. In this round, an artist would be sent by his or her coach to compete against an artist from another team. The selection of the artists and their order of appearance were all decided by their respective coaches, and all of them were done without the knowledge of the opposing coach. Therefore, the battle pairings were completely random, and would only be revealed when the coaches appeared with their selected artist on stage. This is the first time the Bulgarian version has had this phase.

As the Cross Battles are broadcast live the results of the battle will be determined by public vote in real-time. Public votes will be done only during the airing of the episode. After this round, six artists will be remaining to move on in the Grand Final. It is the first time the series has a final with six finalists.

With the elimination of Rashed, Ivanov, and Zdravkovic, Lubo Kirov no longer has any artists remaining on his team. For the first time in the show's history, a coach's team does not have any artists in the grand finale.

Cross battles color key
Artist won the Cross Battle and advanced to the Final from the public's vote
Artist lost the Cross Battle and was eliminated

Cross battles results
Order	Challenger			Challenged		
Order	Coach	Song	Artist	Artist	Song	Coach
1	Lubo	"It's a Man's Man's Man's World"	Jamie Rashed	Ivan E. Ivanov	"Bohemian Rhapsody"	Ivan
2	Ivan	"No Time to Die"	Raya Dimitrova	Hristina Yosifova	"Beautiful"	Dara
3	Galena	"I'd Do Anything for Love"	Georgi Kostadinov	Stefan Zdravković	"Take Me to Church"	Lubo
4	Dara	"Easy on Me"	Lidiya Ganeva	Ivan T. Ivanov	"Wonder"	Lubo
5	Ivan	"Zombie"	Boris Hristov	Ekaterina Sava	"Titanium"	Galena
6	Dara	"Creep"	Daniel Staykov	Petya Paneva	"Spomen"	Galena

=== Episode 14: Final (December 12) ===
The final was divided into three rounds. First, the six finalists performed with a guest, and then the sixth and fifth places were announced. In the second round, the four finalists remaining performed alone and the fourth and third places were, then, revealed. Finally, the Top 2 performed alone again, followed by the winner announcement.

Final results
Round	Order	Coach	Artist	Song	Result
One (Duet with guest)	1	Galena	Georgi Kostadinov (with Miro)	"Don't Let the Sun Go Down on Me"	Top 4
One (Duet with guest)	2	Dara	Lidiya Ganeva (with Grafa)	"Iskam Te"	Top 4
One (Duet with guest)	3	Ivan	Ivan E. Ivanov (with Atanas Penev)	"Are You Gonna Go My Way"	Sixth place
One (Duet with guest)	4	Ivan	Raya Dimitrova (with Victoria Georgieva)	"Tears Getting Sober"	Fifth place
One (Duet with guest)	5	Ivan	Boris Hristov (with Maria Ilieva)	"Endless Love"	Top 4
One (Duet with guest)	6	Galena	Petya Paneva (with Desi Dobreva)	"Katerino Mome"	Top 4
Two (Blind audition song)	1	Galena	Georgi Kostadinov	"A Song for You"	Top 2
Two (Blind audition song)	2	Dara	Lidiya Ganeva	"Drivers License"	Fourth place
Two (Blind audition song)	3	Ivan	Boris Hristov	"Human"	Third place
Two (Blind audition song)	4	Galena	Petya Paneva	"Avram Zornitsa Dumashe"	Top 2
Three (Song in Bulgarian)	1	Galena	Georgi Kostadinov	"Cherno i Byalo"	Runner-up
Three (Song in Bulgarian)	2	Galena	Petya Paneva	"Kalimanku Denku"	Winner

== Elimination chart ==
Artist's info

- Team Ivan
- Team Dara
- Team Galena
- Team Lubo

Result details

- Winner
- Runner-up
- Third place
- Fourth place
- Fifth place
- Sixth place
- Saved by the public
- Eliminated

Results per week
Artists	Week 1 Cross Battles	Week 2 Grand Final
Petya Paneva	Safe	Winner
Georgi Kostadinov	Safe	Runner-up
Boris Hristov	Safe	Third place
Lidiya Ganeva	Safe	Fourth place
Raya Dimitrova	Safe	Fifth place
Ivan E. Ivanov	Safe	Sixth place
Ivan T. Ivanov	Eliminated	Eliminated (Week 1)
Jamie Rashed	Eliminated	Eliminated (Week 1)
Ekaterina Sava	Eliminated	Eliminated (Week 1)
Daniel Staykov	Eliminated	Eliminated (Week 1)
Hristina Yosifova	Eliminated	Eliminated (Week 1)
Stefan Zdravković	Eliminated	Eliminated (Week 1)

=== Per team ===
Artists	Week 1 Cross Battles	Week 2 Grand Final
Boris Hristov	Safe	Third place
Raya Dimitrova	Safe	Fifth place
Ivan E. Ivanov	Safe	Sixth place
Lidiya Ganeva	Safe	Fourth place
Daniel Staykov	Eliminated	
Hristina Yosifova	Eliminated	
Petya Paneva	Safe	Winner
Georgi Kostadinov	Safe	Runner-up
Ekaterina Sava	Eliminated	
Ivan T. Ivanov	Eliminated	
Jamie Rashed	Eliminated	
Stefan Zdravković	Eliminated	

== Contestants appeared on other television contest or previous seasons ==
- Lidiya Ganeva - participated the 2016 Junior Eurovision Song Contest, ended up as the 9th placer
- Kieron Smith - participated on the eighth season of The Voice UK. He was part of team JHud and eliminated in the Battle Rounds.
