= Glasat na Bulgaria season 9 =

Glasat na Bulgaria
- Season 9
- Promotional poster featuring coaches Lubo Kirov, Galena, Dara and Ivan Lechev
- Hosted by: Ivan Tishev; Preyah (backstage)
- Coaches: Ivan Lechev; Dara; Galena; Lubo Kirov
- Winner: Jacklyn Tarracki
- Winning coach: Dara
- Runner-up: Kaloyan Nikolov

Release
- Original network: bTV
- Original release: 4 September – 4 December 2022

Season chronology
- ← Previous; Season 8 Next → Season 10

The ninth season of Bulgarian singing reality competition Glasat na Bulgaria premiered on 4 September 2022. The show is broadcast by bTV on Sundays, starting at 8 pm. The four coaches from previous season, Ivan Lechev, Galena, Lubo Kirov and Dara returned for another season.

Jacklyn Tarracki was crowned the "voice", marking Dara’s first win as a coach.

== Coaches and hosts ==
Coaches for Glasat na Bulgaria season nine

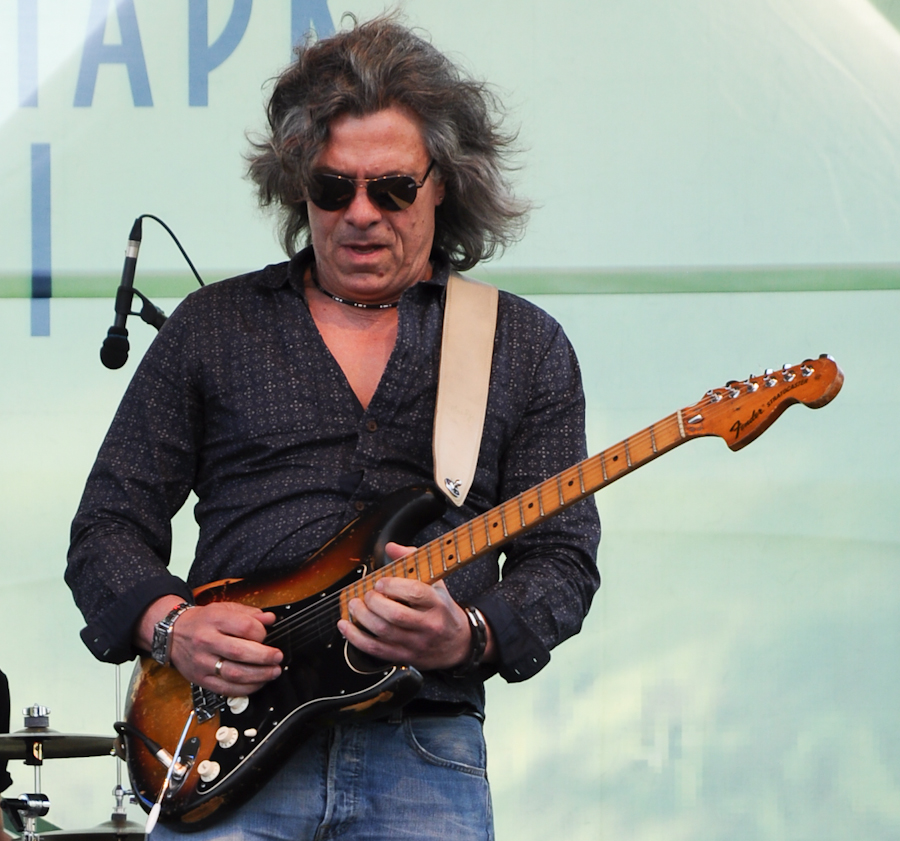
Ivan Lechev

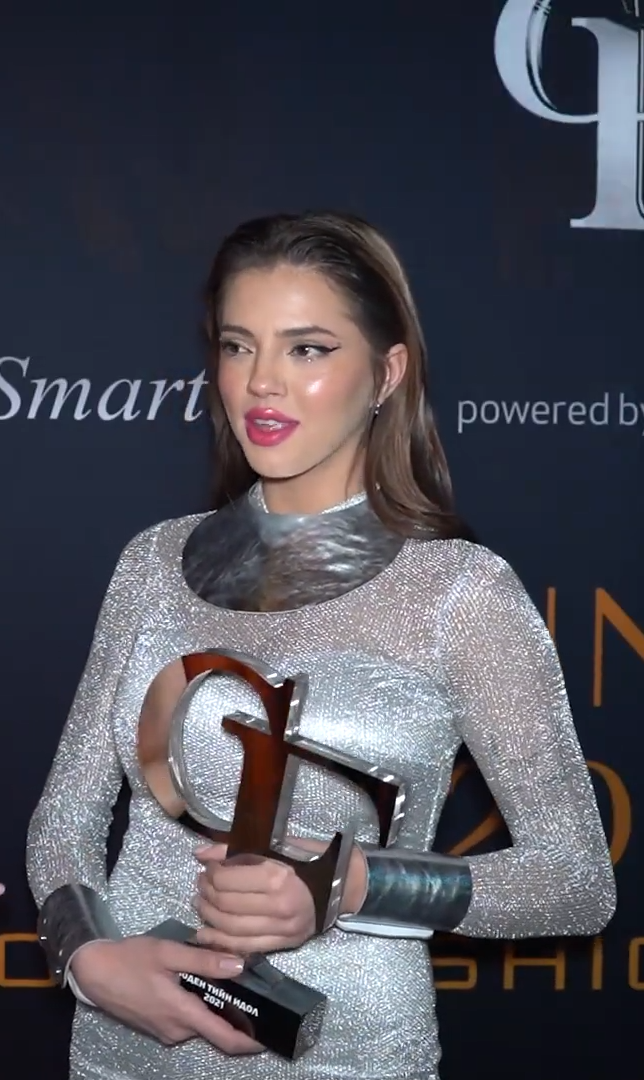
Dara

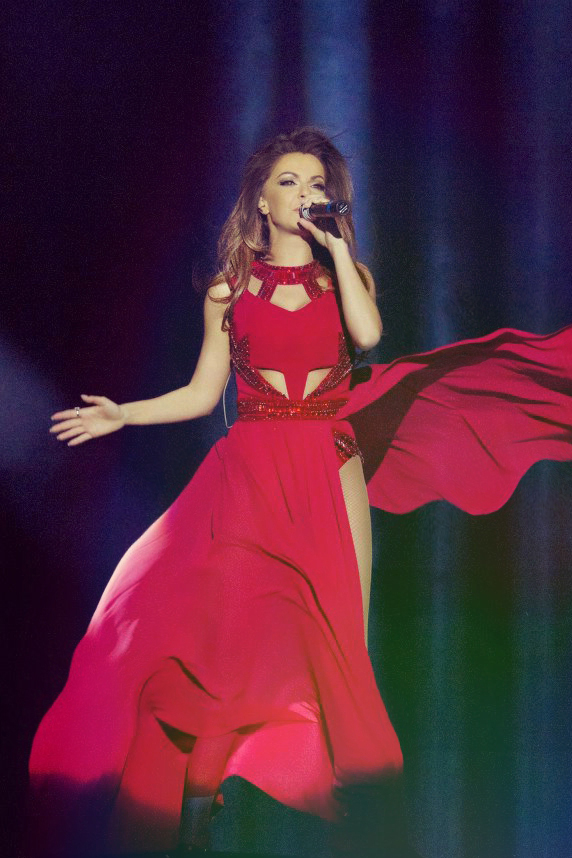
Galena

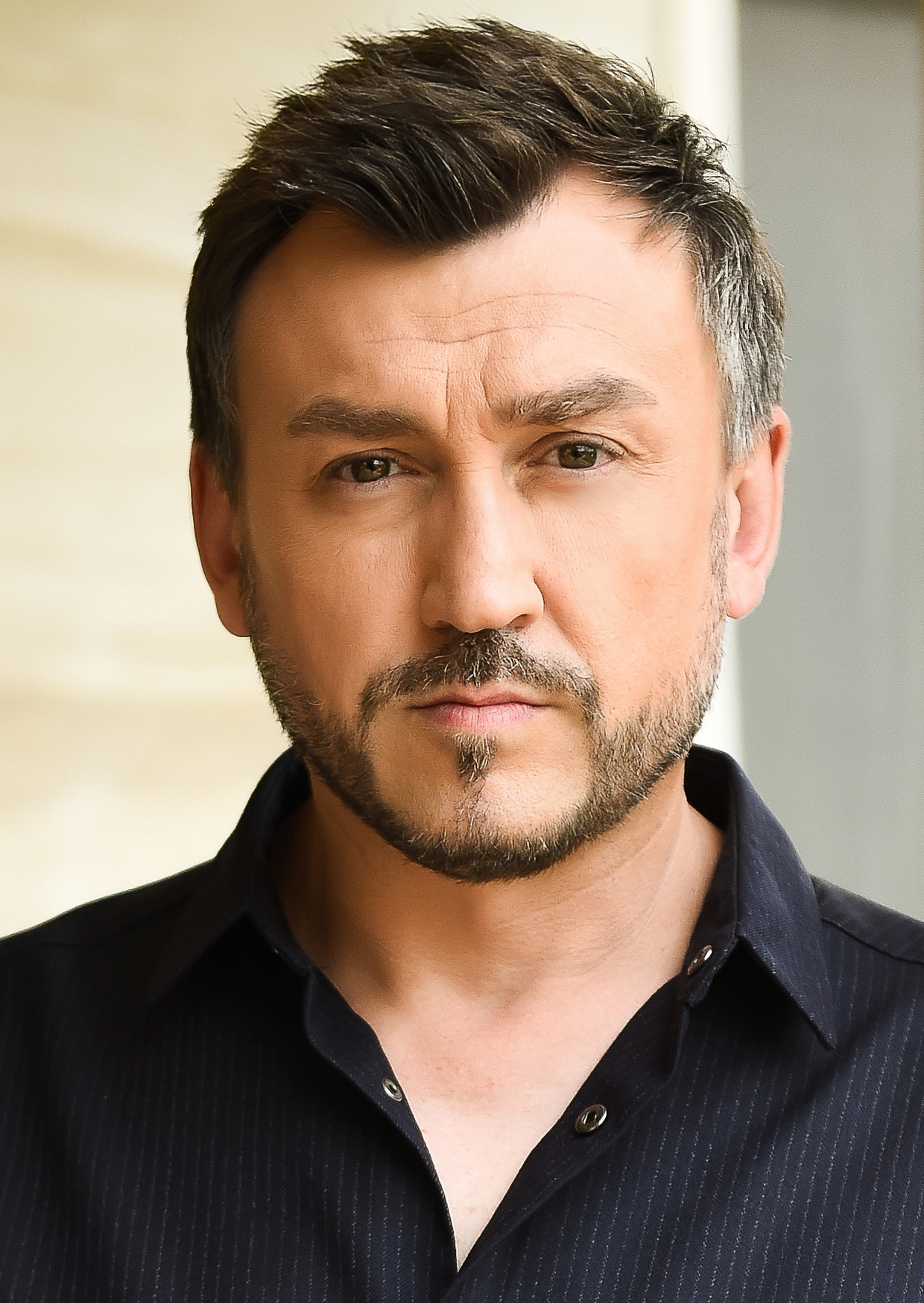
Lubo Kirov

The coaching panel remains unchanged from previous season: Ivan Lechev, Galena, Lubo Kirov and Dara. Ivan Tishev remains as the presenter and is joined by Preyah as V-Reporter online, replacing Alexandra Bogdanska.

== Teams ==
- Winner
- Runner-up
- Third place
- Fourth place
- Fifth place
- Sixth place
- Eliminated in the Live semi-final
- Eliminated in the Cross battles
- Stolen in the Battles
- Artist was eliminated after being switched with another stolen artist
- Eliminated in the Battles
- Eliminated in the Final selection

Coaching teams
Coach	Top 62 Artists				
Ivan Lechev					
Ivan Lechev	Desislava Latinova	Nicola Stoyanov	Boyan Boev	Tsvetelina Petrova	Angel Dobrev
Ivan Lechev	Gergina Peykova	Radostin Vasilev	~~Misher~~	Ami Oprenova	Mariam Yosesvan
Ivan Lechev	Maria-Magdalena	Rusi Tenev	Marina Fovark	Plamen Dimitrov	Gianluca Toto
Ivan Lechev	Kristina Hristova	Mario Georgiev	Denitsa Nikolova	Martin Kiryakov	
Dara					
Dara	Jacklyn Tarrakci	Silvi Philip	Dan Rozin	Maria Theohareva	Jennifer Tsankov
Dara	Donko Markov	Dimitar Filipov	Victoria Maneva	Kaloyan Manolov	Adriana Borovik
Dara	Philip Cholakov	Kosta Kolarov	Luba Ilieva	Martina Stefanova	
Galena					
Galena	Alexandar Petrov	Sonya Mihailova	Misher	Elizabeth Zaharieva	Maxim Panayotov
Galena	Alexander Marinov	Nyagoleta Zheleva	~~Vanesa Chausheva~~	~~Donko Markov~~	Daniela Nikolova
Galena	Teodor Stoyanov	Maria Miteva	Martin Nedelkovich	Miroslava Filipovich	Denislav Karaivanov
Galena	Galina Venelinova				
Lubo Kirov					
Lubo Kirov	Kaloyan Nikolov	Victor Stambolov	Nadezhda Bogoeva	Boris Lapshov	Mariela Petrova
Lubo Kirov	Mirela Kuneva	Vanesa Chausheva	~~Radostin Vasilev~~	Victoria Eleftheriadou	Borislav Nikolov
Lubo Kirov	Denitsa Angelova	Victor Georgiev	Pavel Tsonev	Asen Vladimirov	Alex Linares
Lubo Kirov	Edson D'Alessandro	Maria Lilova			
Note: Italicized names are stolen artists (names struck through within former teams).

== Blind auditions ==
Continuing the rule from the previous season, coaches could have an unlimited number of contestants on their team and finalize them at the end of the auditions. However, unlike last season, coaches have to cut their team members down to 12 participants, instead of 14. Each coach was given two "blocks" to use during the blinds, but Dara and Galena only used one.

Blind auditions color key
✔	Coach pressed "I WANT YOU" button
	Artist joined this coach's team
	Artist selected to join this coach's team
	Artist was eliminated as no coach pressed their button
	Artist was, initially, part of the team but was eliminated on the cut round
✘	Coach pressed "I WANT YOU" button, but was:
	Blocked by Ivan; Blocked by Dara; Blocked by Galena; Blocked by Lubo

=== Episode 1 (4 September) ===
Order	Artist	Age	Hometown	Song	Coach's and artist's choices			
Order	Artist	Age	Hometown	Song	Ivan	Dara	Galena	Lubo
1	Boris Lapshov	34	Sofia	"It's All Coming Back to Me Now"	✔	✔	✘	✔
2	Desislava Latinova	23	Sofia	"Losing My Religion"	✔	✔	✔	✔
3	Mariya Marinova	29	Burgas	"Just Like a Pill"	—	—	—	—
4	Vanesa Chausheva	20	Petrich	"The Joke"	✔	✔	✔	✔
5	Kaloyan Manolov	35	Varna	"Hallelujah I Love Her So"	✔	✔	✔	✔
6	Mira Zaharieva	22	Shumen	"Bez Teb"	—	—	—	—
7	Dan Rozin	23	Israel	"You Are So Beautiful"	✔	✔	✔	✔
8	Teodora Filcheva	19	Hisarya	"Love is a Lie"	—	—	—	—
9	Angel Dobrev	38	Kameno	"Yalan"	✔	—	—	—
10	Nicola Stoyanov	26	Sofia	"Careless Whisper"	✔	—	—	✔
11	Martina Petrova	21	Pleven	"You Know I'm No Good"	—	—	—	—
12	Mirela Kuneva	26	Sliven	"...Baby One More Time"	✔	—	✔	✔
13	Sonya Mihailova	23	Brezhani	"Izlel ye Delyo Haydutin"	✔	✔	✔	✔

=== Episode 2 (11 September) ===
Order	Artist	Age	Hometown	Song	Coach's and artist's choices			
Order	Artist	Age	Hometown	Song	Ivan	Dara	Galena	Lubo
1	Nadezhda Bogoeva	18	Varna	"What Now"	✔	✔	✔	✔
2	Maxim Panayotov	16	Dobrich	"Tarsia te Noshtem"	—	✔	✔	—
3	Marina Yordanova	38	Dragomir	"Funhouse"	—	—	—	—
4	Silvi Filip	38	Sofia	"Who Wants to Live Forever" / "Bohemian Rapsody"	✔	✔	✔	✔
5	Plamen Dimitrov	47	Sofia	"V Drugo Vreme, V Drug Svyat"	✔	—	—	—
6	Liana George	27	Berlin	"Rolling in the Deep"	—	—	—	—
7	Gergina Peykova	17	Harmanli	"Respect"	✔	—	✔	✔
8	Victoria Eleftheriadou	20	Cyprus	"Don't You Remember"	—	—	—	✔
9	Rusi Tenev	25	Haskovo	"Mistreated"	✔	✔	✔	✔
10	Anna Yanova	32	Sofia	"Over the Rainbow"	—	—	—	—
11	Jacklyn Tarrakci	18	Sofia	"My Mind"	✔	✔	✔	✔
12	Alexander Petrov	20	Dobrich	"Broken Vow"	✔	✔	✔	✔

=== Episode 3 (18 September) ===
Order	Artist	Age	Hometown	Song	Coach's and artist's choices			
Order	Artist	Age	Hometown	Song	Ivan	Dara	Galena	Lubo
1	Dimitar Filipov	29	Sofia	"It's a Man's Man's Man's World"	✘	✔	✔	✔
2	Daniela Nikolova	39	Yambol	"My Kind of Love"	✔	✔	✔	✔
3	Victor Trifonov	29	Ruse	"Sartseto Mi"	—	—	—	—
4	Victoria Maneva	20	Bata	"Habits"	✔	✔	✔	✔
5	Gianluca Toto	30	Bari	"Sweet Home Chicago"	✔	✔	✔	✔
6	Christina Zhekova	29	Varna	"Proshepnati Mechti"	—	—	—	—
7	Borislav Nikolov	19	Razgrad	"Black Bear"	✔	—	—	✔
8	Maria Lilova	18	Varna	"La Alegria"	✔	✔	✔	✔
9	Nyagoleta Zheleva	30	Sliven	"Cipele"	✔	—	✔	✔
10	Kristina Hristova	27	Varna	"Chernata Ovtsa"	✔	—	—	—
11	Denislav Blagoev	23	Vidin	"Wake Me Up"	—	—	—	—
12	Tsvetelina Petrova	21	Nova Zagora	"Love on the Brain"	✔	✔	✔	✔
13	Kaloyan Nikolov	31	Burgas	"Frozen"	✘	✔	✔	✔

=== Episode 4 (25 September) ===
Order	Artist	Age	Hometown	Song	Coach's and artist's choices			
Order	Artist	Age	Hometown	Song	Ivan	Dara	Galena	Lubo
1	Elizabeth Zaharieva	16	Pleven	"I'm Tired"	✔	✘	✔	✔
2	Victor Stambolov	38	Plovdiv	"Iris"	✔	—	—	✔
3	Mihail Georgiou	18	Nova Zagora	"Fly Me to the Moon"	—	—	—	—
4	Adriana Borovik	20	Odesa	"Listata Padat"	✔	✔	—	—
5	Alex Linares	38	Sofia	"Hoy"	✔	—	—	✔
6	Martina Stefanova	16	Burgas	"Wish You Were Gay"	—	✔	—	—
7	Alexander Marinov	44	Samokov	"Theo Na Me Neoseis"	—	—	✔	—
8	Raya Alamurova	21	Dryanovo	"Somebody to Love"	—	—	—	—
9	Antonio Kostadinov	25	Plovdiv	"Blue on Black"	—	—	—	—
10	Jennifer Tsankov	20	Plovdiv	"Blow"	✔	✔	✔	✔
11	Mariam Movsesyan	47	Sofia	"Piece of My Heart"	✔	✔	—	—
12	Ivaylo Mihailov	35	Sofia	"Love, Reign o'er Me"	—	—	—	—
13	Mariela Petrova	36	Varna	"I Feel It Coming"	✔	—	—	✔
14	Donko Markov	17	Varna	"Slantse Zaide"	✔	✔	✔	✔

=== Episode 5 (1 October) ===
Order	Artist	Age	Hometown	Song	Coach's and artist's choices			
Order	Artist	Age	Hometown	Song	Ivan	Dara	Galena	Lubo
1	Kosta Kolarov	25	Dobrich	"Even Flow"	✘	✔	—	—
2	Ami Oprenova	30	Sofia	"I Want You Back"	✔	—	—	✔
3	Milena Lyubenova	44	Sofia	"Sto Zivota"	—	—	—	—
4	Denitsa Nikolova	22	Razgrad	"Because of You"	✔	—	—	—
5	Denislav Karaivanov	25	Ezerovo	"When I Was Your Man"	—	✔	✔	✔
6	Anna Stancheva	23	Elin Pelin	"Stapka Napred"	—	—	—	—
7	Miroslava Filipovich	38	Kharkov	"It's Oh So Quiet"	—	—	✔	—
8	Asen Vladimirov	23	Strazhitsa	"Keeping Me Alive"	✔	—	—	✔
9	Hristo Bankov	17	Sveti Vlas	"Puttin' On the Ritz"	—	—	—	—
10	Marina Fovark	29	Lille	"Anyone"	✔	✔	✔	✔

=== Episode 6 (9 October) ===
Order	Artist	Age	Hometown	Song	Coach's and artist's choices			
Order	Artist	Age	Hometown	Song	Ivan	Dara	Galena	Lubo
1	Martin Nedeljkovic	33	Pirot	"Nesanica"	—	✔	✔	✔
2	Maria-Magdalena	31	Sofia	"Danyova Mama"	✔	✔	—	✔
3	David Nikolaev	24	Sofia	"Folsom Prison Blues"	—	—	—	—
4	Denitsa Angelova	27	Dobrich	"Don't Start Now"	✔	—	—	✔
5	Boyan Boev	22	Plovdiv	"Wonderwall"	✔	—	—	✘
6	Nikita Georgieva	16	Varna	"My Future"	—	—	—	—
7	Mario Georgiev	30	Sofia	"One"	✔	—	—	—
8	Maria Miteva	33	Pevtsite	"Dar ot Boga"	—	—	✔	—
9	Luba Ilieva	25	Sofia	"Stop This Flame"	—	✔	—	—
10	Radostina Mavrodieva	40	Varna	"Ring My Bell"	—	—	—	—
11	Edson D'Alessandro	24	Italy	"Apologize"	✔	✔	✔	✔
12	Galina Venelinova	—	—	"Siten Dazhd"	✔	✔	✔	✔
13	Marin Markov	48	Sofia	"Hvani Zhivota si v Ratse"	—	—	—	—
14	Julia Markova	19	Sofia	"I'd Rather Go Blind"	—	—	—	—
15	Radostin Vasilev	29	Plovdiv	"Ako Imash Vreme"	✔	✔	✔	✔

=== Episode 7 (16 October) ===
Mihaela Marinova appeared as a guest performer with her duet song with coach Lubo Kirov "Moga" at the end of the auditions.

Order	Artist	Age	Hometown	Song	Coach's and artist's choices			
Order	Artist	Age	Hometown	Song	Ivan	Dara	Galena	Lubo
1	Misher	38	Sofia	"You Oughta Know"	✔	✔	✔	✔
2	Violina Stefanovа	17	Dupnitsa	"Greshnitsi"	—	—	—	—
3	Teodor Stoyanov	25	Haskovo	"Break My Heart Again"	✔	✔	✔	✔
4	Victoria Andonova	31	Blagoevgrad	"Irreplaceable"	—	—	—	—
5	Victor Georgiev	44	Sofia	"In the Air Tonight"	✔	—	—	✔
6	Maria Theohareva	18	Varna	"You Broke Me First"	—	✔	—	✔
7	Martin Kiryakov	24	Sofia	"Blowin' in the Wind"	✔	✔	—	—
8	Mariana Pashalieva	64	Sofia	"Miserere"	—	—	—	—
9	Pavel Tsonev	33	Stara Zagora	"Enemy"	✔	✔	—	✔
10	Philip Cholakov	20	Sofia	"Bad Habits"	—	✔	—	—
11	Gergana Borislalova	33	Vratsa	"Ne Iskam"	—	—	—	—

== Battles ==
The battles begin airing on October 23. The battle advisors for each coach this season were the following: Alexandrina Pendatchanska for Team Ivan, Mihaela Marinova for Team Dara, third season coach Desi Slava for Team Galena, and Nina Nikolina for Team Lubo.

New to this season is the implementation of "unlimited steals". Each artist that is stolen will sit in a designated seat in the "Steal room" as they watch the other performances. If a coach steals one artist but later decides to steal another, the previous artist will be replaced and eliminated. After the battle rounds, the artist who ends-up seating on the chair will move to the next round.

Battles color key
Artist won the battle
Artist lost the battle but was stolen by another coach
Artist lost the battle and was stolen by another coach, but was later switched with another artist
Artist lost the battle and was eliminated

Battles results
Episode	Order	Coach	Winner	Song	Loser	'Steal' result			
Episode	Order	Coach	Winner	Song	Loser	Ivan	Dara	Galena	Lubo
Episode 8 (23 October)	1	Ivan	Gergina Peykova	"It's Raining Men"	Mariam Yosesvan	—N/a	✔	—	—
Episode 8 (23 October)	2	Dara	Jacklyn Tarrakci	"I See Red"	Victoria Maneva	✔	—N/a	—	—
Episode 8 (23 October)	3	Galena	Alexandar Petrov	"Chui me"	Daniela Nikolova	—	—	—N/a	✔
Episode 8 (23 October)	4	Lubo	Mirela Kuneva	"Bad Guy"	Borislav Nikolov	—	—	✔	—N/a
Episode 8 (23 October)	5	Ivan	Angel Dobrev	"Aïcha"	Marina Fovark	—N/a	—	—	—
Episode 8 (23 October)	6	Dara	Silvi Filip	"Candyman"	Luba Ilieva	—	—N/a	—	—
Episode 8 (23 October)	7	Galena	Nyagoleta Zheleva	"Zavinagi"	Teodor Stoyanov	—	✔	—N/a	—
Episode 8 (23 October)	8	Lubo	Kaloyan Nikolov	"Stay"	Radostin Vasilev	✔	✔	✔	—N/a
Episode 9 (30 October)	1	Lubo	Boris Lapshov	"This Is Me"	Pavel Tsonev	—	—	—	—N/a
Episode 9 (30 October)	2	Dara	Jennifer Tsankov	"Give In to Me"	Kosta Kolarov	—	—N/a	—	—
Episode 9 (30 October)	3	Ivan	Tsvetelina Petrova	"Valerie"	Ami Opraneva	—N/a	✔	—	—
Episode 9 (30 October)	4	Galena	Alexander Marinov	"Lane Moje"	Martin Nedelkovich	—	—	—N/a	—
Episode 9 (30 October)	5	Lubo	Nadezhda Bogoeva	"Boyfriend"	Victoria Eleftheriadou	—	—	✔	—N/a
Episode 9 (30 October)	6	Ivan	Boyan Boev	"Satisfaction"	Rusi Tenev	—N/a	—	—	—
Episode 9 (30 October)	7	Dara	Maria Theohareva	"ABCDEFU"	Philip Cholakov	—	—N/a	—	—
Episode 9 (30 October)	8	Galena	Sonya Mihailova	"Lale Li Si, Zyumbul Li si?"	Donko Markov	—	✔	—N/a	—
Episode 10 (6 November)	1	Ivan	Desislava Latinova	"Smells Like Teen Spirit"	Misher	—N/a	—	✔	—
Episode 10 (6 November)	2	Dara	Dan Rozin	"Easy on Me"	Adriana Borovik	—	—N/a	—	—
Episode 10 (6 November)	3	Lubo	Victor Stambolov	"I Stand Alone"	Victor Georgiev	—	—	—	—N/a
Episode 10 (6 November)	4	Galena	Maxim Panayotov	"Kazvash, che me obichash"	Maria Miteva	—	—	—N/a	—
Episode 10 (6 November)	5	Ivan	Nicola Stoyanov	"Numb" / "Bring Me To Life"	Maria-Magdalena	—N/a	—	—	—
Episode 10 (6 November)	6	Lubo	Mariela Petrova	"Cold Heart"	Denitsa Angelova	—	—	—	—N/a
Episode 10 (6 November)	7	Dara	Dimitar Filipov	"Uptown Funk"	Kaloyan Manolov	—	—N/a	—	—
Episode 10 (6 November)	8	Galena	Elizabeth Zaharieva	"Hold My Hand"	Vanesa Chausheva	—	—	—N/a	✔

== Cross Battles ==
The Cross Battles began airing on 13 November and ended on 20 November. In this round, each coach was left with seven contestants. For the first time, the singers did not know their competitor until the moment of performing. The studio public voted after each battle. Only fourteen contestants, regardless of team, were let through the Semi-final.

Cross battles color key
Artist won the Cross Battle and advanced to the Semi-final
Artist lost the Cross Battle and was originally eliminated, but was voted by the public to advance in the semi-final
Artist lost the Cross Battle and was eliminated

=== Episode 11 (13 November) ===
Cross battles results
Order	Challenger			Challenged		
Order	Coach	Song	Artist	Artist	Song	Coach
1	Ivan	"Is This Love"	Radostin Vasilev	Misher	"Nothing Compares 2 U"	Galena
2	Lubo	"Neka Vali"	Vanesa Chausheva	Jacklyn Tarrakci	"Voilà"	Dara
3	Galena	"Zhenala e dyulber Yana"	Nyagoleta Zheleva	Boris Lapshov	"Into The Unknown"	Lubo
4	Dara	"Born This Way"	Silvi Philip	Gergina Peykova	"I'm Every Woman"	Ivan
5	Ivan	"Tez ochi zeleni"	Angel Dobrev	Sonya Mihailova	"Edna Bulgarska Roza"	Galena
6	Lubo	"From Can to Can't"	Viktor Stambolov	Dimitar Filipov	"When a Man Loves a Woman"	Dara
7	Galena	"All by Myself"	Elizabeth Zaharieva	Donko Markov	"One and Only"	Dara

=== Episode 12 (20 November) ===
Cross battles results
Order	Challenger			Challenged		
Order	Coach	Song	Artist	Artist	Song	Coach
1	Dara	"Make Me Wanna Die"	Jennifer Tsankov	Kaloyan Nikolov	"Writing's on the Wall"	Lubo
2	Ivan	"I Put a Spell on You"	Tsvetelina Petrova	Maria Theohareva	"Killing Me Softly with His Song"	Dara
3	Lubo	"Zitti e buoni"	Mirela Kuneva	Nicola Stoyanov	"God Is a Woman"	Ivan
4	Galena	"Ubivame s lubov"	Maxim Panayotov	Nadezhda Bogoeva	"Seven Nation Army"	Lubo
5	Dara	"Kiss from a Rose"	Dan Rozin	Boyan Boev	"Running Up That Hill"	Ivan
6	Ivan	"Bruises"	Desislava Latinova	Alexander Marinov	"Davam vsichko za teb"	Galena
7	Lubo	"Shy Guy"	Mariela Petrova	Alexandar Petrov	"Unchained Melody"	Galena

== Live shows ==
=== Semi-final ===
The semi-final aired on 27 November. In this round, fourteen artists were left in the competition. However, this season the public could choose a fifteenth semi-finalist, who had previously been eliminated. The public voted for Maxim Panayotov from Team Galena to take this spot. Six artists, from any team, were voted through to the finale. Unlike the previous season, every coach is represented in the finale.

Semi-final color key
Artist advanced to the finale from the public's vote
Artist was eliminated

Semi-final results
Order	Coach	Artist	Song	Result
1	Lubo	Kaloyan Nikolov	"I Want It All"	Advanced
2	Galena	Elizabeth Zaharieva	"Hurt"	Eliminated
3	Ivan	Nicola Stoyanov	"Gimme! Gimme! Gimme!"	Eliminated
4	Dara	Silvi Philip	"Wrecking Ball"	Eliminated
5	Galena	Alexandar Petrov	"Rekviem"	Advanced
6	Galena	Misher	"Kakto predi"	Eliminated
7	Ivan	Tsvetelina Petrova	"Who You Are"	Eliminated
8	Lubo	Victor Stambolov	"I Will Always Love You"	Advanced
9	Galena	Sonya Mihailova	"Ederlezi"	Advanced
10	Lubo	Boris Lapshov	"Back in Black" / "We Will Rock You" / "Stayin' Alive"	Eliminated
11	Ivan	Desislava Latinova	"Soldier of Fortune"	Advanced
12	Lubo	Nadezhda Bogoeva	"Tears of Gold"	Eliminated
13	Galena	Maxim Panayotov	"Da si tuk"	Eliminated
14	Ivan	Boyan Boev	"Obseben"	Eliminated
15	Dara	Jacklyn Tarrakci	"Horshat Hai Caliptus"	Advanced

=== Final ===
Final results
Round	Order	Coach	Artist	Song	Result
One (Duet with guest)	1	Lubo	Kaloyan Nikolov (with Poli Genova)	"So What"	Top 4
One (Duet with guest)	2	Galena	Sonya Mihailova (with Medi)	"Edinstveni"	Top 4
One (Duet with guest)	3	Ivan	Desislava Latinova (with Kristian Kostov)	"I See Fire"	Fifth place
One (Duet with guest)	4	Lubo	Victor Stambolov (with Ersin Mustafov)	"You're the Voice"	Sixth place
One (Duet with guest)	5	Dara	Jacklyn Tarrakci (with Mihaela Fileva)	"When You Believe"	Top 4
One (Duet with guest)	6	Galena	Alexander Petrov (with Margarita Hranova)	"Ako si dal"	Top 4
Two (Song by the contestant's choice)	1	Lubo	Kaloyan Nikolov	"Jealousy"	Top 2
Two (Song by the contestant's choice)	2	Galena	Alexandar Petrov	"Sbogom, moya lyubov"	Third place
Two (Song by the contestant's choice)	3	Dara	Jacklyn Tarrakci	"Je Suis Malade"	Top 2
Two (Song by the contestant's choice)	4	Galena	Sonya Mihailova	"Oblache le byalo"	Fourth place
Three (Song by the contestant's choice)	1	Lubo	Kaloyan Nikolov	"Don't Stop Believin'"	Runner-up
Three (Song by the contestant's choice)	2	Dara	Jacklyn Tarrakci	"Povey, vetre"	Winner

== Elimination chart ==
Artist's info

- Team Ivan
- Team Dara
- Team Galena
- Team Lubo

Result details

- Winner
- Runner-up
- Third place
- Fourth place
- Fifth place
- Sixth place
- Saved by the public
- Eliminated

Results per week
Artists	Week 1 Semi-final	Week 2 Final
Jacklyn Tarrakci	Safe	Winner
Kaloyan Nikolov	Safe	Runner-up
Alexandar Petrov	Safe	Third place
Sonya Mihailova	Safe	Fourth place
Desislava Latinova	Safe	Fifth place
Victor Stambolov	Safe	Sixth place
Elizabeth Zaharieva	Eliminated	Eliminated (Week 1)
Nicola Stoyanov	Eliminated	Eliminated (Week 1)
Silvi Philip	Eliminated	Eliminated (Week 1)
Misher	Eliminated	Eliminated (Week 1)
Tsvetelina Petrova	Eliminated	Eliminated (Week 1)
Boris Lapshov	Eliminated	Eliminated (Week 1)
Nadezhda Bogoeva	Eliminated	Eliminated (Week 1)
Maxim Panayotov	Eliminated	Eliminated (Week 1)
Boyan Boev	Eliminated	Eliminated (Week 1)

=== Per team ===
Artists	Week 1 Cross Battles	Week 2 Grand Final
Desislava Latinova	Safe	Fifth place
Nicola Stoyanov	Eliminated	
Tsvetelina Petrova	Eliminated	
Boyan Boev	Eliminated	
Jacklyn Tarrakci	Safe	Winner
Silvi Philip	Eliminated	
Alexandar Petrov	Safe	Third place
Sonya Mihailova	Safe	Fourth place
Elizabeth Zaharieva	Eliminated	
Misher	Eliminated	
Maxim Panayotov	Eliminated	
Kaloyan Nikolov	Safe	Runner-up
Victor Stambolov	Safe	Sixth place
Boris Lapshov	Eliminated	
Nadezhda Bogoeva	Eliminated	
