= One of Mine =

Studio album by Jimmy McGriff
- Released: 1963
- Recorded: 1963
- Studio: New York City, NY
- Genre: Jazz
- Length: 44:15
- Label: Sue; LP /STLP 1013
- Producer: Juggy Murray

Jimmy McGriff chronology
I've Got a Woman (1962)	One of Mine (1963)	Jimmy McGriff at the Apollo (1963)

One of Mine is an album by organist Jimmy McGriff recorded and released by Sue Records in 1963.

== Reception ==
Professional ratings
Review scores
Source	Rating
Allmusic	3.5/5 stars
The Penguin Guide to Jazz Recordings	2.5/4 stars

The Allmusic review by Michael Erlewine stated "His second album, again on Sue. ... ten hi-energy cuts".

== Track listing ==
All compositions by Jimmy McGriff except where noted

1. "Gospel Time" – 5:30
2. "Gospel Time Encore" – 3:07
3. "Spindletop" – 4:07
4. "Teach Me Tonight" (Gene De Paul, Sammy Cahn) – 5:53
5. "The Last Minute" – 4:18
6. "Moonlight in Vermont" (Karl Suessdorf, John Blackburn) – 3:47
7. "Blip Time" – 3:20
8. "One of Mine" – 4:36
9. "Drown in My Own Tears" (Henry Glover) – 3:55
10. "Broadway" (Billy Bird, Teddy McRae, Henri Woode) – 5:42

== Personnel ==
- Jimmy McGriff – organ
- Morris Dow – guitar, harmonica
- Larry Frazier – rhythm guitar
- Willie "Saint" Jenkins – drums
