= Christmas with McGriff =

Studio album by Jimmy McGriff
- Released: November 1963
- Recorded: 1963
- Studio: New York City, NY
- Genre: Jazz
- Length: 36:05
- Label: Sue; LP /STLP 1018
- Producer: Juggy Murray

Jimmy McGriff chronology
Jimmy McGriff at the Apollo (1963)	Christmas with McGriff (1963)	Jimmy McGriff at the Organ (1964)

Christmas with McGriff is an album of christmas music by organist Jimmy McGriff recorded and released by Sue Records in 1963. It charted for one week peaking at #30 on Billboard's Christmas Record Album chart on December 26, 1964.

Professional ratings
Review scores
Source	Rating
Allmusic	2/5 stars
The Penguin Guide to Jazz Recordings	2.5/4 stars

== Track listing ==
All compositions by Jimmy McGriff except where noted

1. "White Christmas" (Irving Berlin) – 3:14
2. "Christmas with McGriff" – 5:52
3. "I Saw Mommy Kissing Santa Claus" (Tommie Connor) – 6:35
4. "Hip Santa" – 3:05
5. "Winter Wonderland" (Felix Bernard, Richard B. Smith) – 5:10
6. "Santa Claus Is Comin' to Town" (John Frederick Coots, Haven Gillespie) – 3:33
7. "Rudolph the Red-Nosed Reindeer" (Johnny Marks) – 5:04
8. "Jingle Bells" (James Lord Pierpont) – 3:34

== Personnel ==
- Jimmy McGriff – organ
- Rudolph Johnson – tenor saxophone
- Larry Frazier – guitar
- Willie "Saint" Jenkins – drums
