= Where the Action's At! =

Live album by Jimmy McGriff
- Released: 1966
- Recorded: December 30, 1965
- Venue: The Front Bar, Newark, NJ
- Genre: Jazz
- Length: 40:36
- Label: Veep; VPL-13515 / VPS 16515
- Producer: Sonny Lester

Jimmy McGriff chronology
Blues for Mister Jimmy (1965)	Where the Action's At! (1966)	The Big Band (1966)

Where the Action's At! is a live album by organist Jimmy McGriff recorded in New Jersey and released on Veep label in 1966.

== Reception ==
Flophouse magazine stated "Production-wise, the album may be so-so, the drums sounding muffled, but as far as the standard of playing is concerned, it’s a gem!".

== Track listing ==
All compositions by Jimmy McGriff except where noted

1. "Where It's At" – 4:32
2. "When Johnny Comes Marching Home" (Traditional) – 4:00
3. "Up Tight" (Stevie Wonder, Sylvia Moy, Henry Cosby) – 5:48
4. "Frugal Bugle" – 6:28
5. "Upper-Ground" – 5:00
6. "Georgia on My Mind" (Hoagy Carmichael) – 5:40
7. "Goin' Out of My Head" (Bobby Weinstein, Teddy Randazzo) – 3:58
8. "Robbins Nest" (Illinois Jacquet Sir Charles Thompson) – 5:08

== Personnel ==
- Jimmy McGriff – organ
- Thornel Schwartz – guitar
- Willie "Saint" Jenkins – drums
