= Topkapi (album) =

Studio album by Jimmy McGriff
- Released: November 1964
- Recorded: 1964
- Studios: New York City, NY
- Genre: Jazz
- Length: 27:38
- Labels: Sue; LP /STLP 1033
- Producers: Joe Lederman, Juggy Murray

Jimmy McGriff chronology
Jimmy McGriff at the Organ (1964)	Topkapi (1964)	Blues for Mister Jimmy (1965)

Topkapi is an album of motion picture and television themes by organist Jimmy McGriff recorded and released by Sue Records in 1964.

== Reception ==
Professional ratings
Review scores
Source	Rating
Allmusic	2.5/5 stars
The Penguin Guide to Jazz Recordings	2/4 stars

The Allmusic review by Michael Erlewine stated "The orchestra sounds like Muzak, but McGriff sounds like McGriff. How the two got together is anyone's guess".

== Track listing ==
1. "The Man with the Golden Arm" (Elmer Bernstein) – 2:24
2. "Mr. Lucky" (Henry Mancini) – 2:30
3. "Topkapi" (Manos Hadjidakis) – 2:28
4. "Rawhide" (Dimitri Tiomkin, Ned Washington) – 2:10
5. "Exodus Main Theme" (Ernest Gold) – 2:00
6. "People" (Jule Styne, Bob Merrill) – 2:26
7. "Woman of Straw" (Norman Percival) – 2:40
8. "From Russia with Love" (Lionel Bart) – 2:30
9. "A Taste of Honey" (Ric Marlow, Bobby Scott) – 2:13
10. "Love Theme from "The World of Suzie Wong"" (George Duning) – 2:13
11. "Medic Theme" (Victor Young) – 2:02
12. "The Pink Panther Theme" (Mancini) – 2:02

== Personnel ==
- Jimmy McGriff – organ
- Unidentified orchestra arranged by Fred Norman
