= Blues for Mister Jimmy =

Studio album by Jimmy McGriff
- Released: 1965
- Recorded: 1965
- Genre: Jazz
- Length: 34:48
- Label: Sue; LP /STLP 1039

Jimmy McGriff chronology
Topkapi (1965)	Blues for Mister Jimmy (1965)	Where the Action's At! (1966)

Blues for Mister Jimmy is an album by organist Jimmy McGriff recorded and released by Sue Records in 1965.

== Reception ==
Professional ratings
Review scores
Source	Rating
Allmusic	3/5 stars
The Penguin Guide to Jazz Recordings	3/4 stars

The Allmusic review by Steve Leggett stated "Blues for Mr. Jimmy was the last album Hammond B-3 ace Jimmy McGriff recorded for Sue Records before moving on to Solid State Records in 1965, and in some ways it is the archetypal McGriff record. Working in a trio format with drummer Jimmie Smith and guitarist Larry Frazier, McGriff is in fine form, bringing his patented blues- and gospel-inflected soul jazz to the edge of funk on a group of mostly original pieces".

== Track listing ==
All compositions by Jimmy McGriff except where noted

1. "Discotheque U.S.A." – 3:21
2. "Cash Box" – 3:39
3. "Blues for Joe" – 3:00
4. "Blues for Mr. Jimmy" – 4:52
5. "The Dog (You Dog)" – 3:25
6. "Bump de Bump" – 3:37
7. "The Party's Over" (Jule Styne, Adolph Green, Betty Comden) – 4:05
8. "Turn Blue" – 4:36
9. "Sho' Nuff" – 3:51

== Personnel ==
- Jimmy McGriff – organ
- Larry Frazier – guitar
- Jimmie Smith – drums
