= Jimmy McGriff at the Apollo =

Live album by Jimmy McGriff
- Released: 1963
- Recorded: 1963
- Venue: Apollo Theater, New York City, NY
- Genre: Jazz
- Length: 37:19
- Label: Sue; LP /STLP 1017
- Producer: Juggy Murray

Jimmy McGriff chronology
One of Mine (1963)	Jimmy McGriff at the Apollo (1963)	Christmas with McGriff (1963)

Jimmy McGriff at the Apollo is a live album by organist Jimmy McGriff recorded at the Apollo Theater and released on Sue Records in 1963.

== Reception ==
Professional ratings
Review scores
Source	Rating
Allmusic	4.5/5 stars
The Penguin Guide to Jazz Recordings	2.5/4 stars

The AllMusic review stated "There's no question; organist Jimmy McGriff and company cook up some steaming blues grooves on this live date. Beyond that, though, there is little that distinguishes this set from countless others in the same mold. McGriff and his band are a dynamo when they unite in churning, bluesy bluster. As individual players, however, no one here generates much in the way of a memorable performance. ... To McGriff's credit, he pulls these talents together so they total something more than the sum of the parts".

== Track listing ==
All compositions by Jimmy McGriff except where noted

1. "There Will Never Be Another You" (Harry Warren, Mack Gordon) – 6:15
2. "We Four" – 5:45
3. "A Thing for Jug" – 5:45
4. "Red Sails in the Sunset" (Hugh Williams, Jimmy Kennedy) – 5:45
5. "Lonely Avenue" (Doc Pomus) – 6:00
6. "Frame for the Blues" (Slide Hampton) – 5:45

== Personnel ==
- Jimmy McGriff – organ
- Rudolph Johnson – tenor saxophone
- Larry Frazier – guitar
- Willie "Saint" Jenkins – drums
