= Jimmy McGriff at the Organ =

Studio album by Jimmy McGriff
- Released: 1964
- Recorded: 1964
- Studio: New York City, NY
- Genre: Jazz
- Length: 37:57
- Label: Sue; LP /STLP 1020
- Producer: Joe Lederman, Juggy Murray

Jimmy McGriff chronology
Christmas with McGriff (1963)	Jimmy McGriff at the Organ (1964)	Topkapi (1965)

Jimmy McGriff at the Organ is an album by organist Jimmy McGriff recorded and released by Sue Records in 1964.

== Reception ==
Professional ratings
Review scores
Source	Rating
Allmusic	3/5 stars
The Penguin Guide to Jazz Recordings	3/4 stars

The Allmusic review by Michael Erlewine stated "This is drum/sax driven McGriff at his best".

== Track listing ==
All compositions by Jimmy McGriff except where noted

1. "Kiko" – 3:28
2. "Jumpin' at the Woodside" (Count Basie) – 3:21
3. "All Day Long" (Billy Strayhorn) – 3:52
4. "That's All" (Thomas Waller) – 5:29
5. "Hello Betty" – 4:58
6. "Close Your Eyes" (Will Collins, Al Lewis) – 5:26
7. "When You're Smiling the Whole World Smiles with You" (Mark Fisher, Joe Goodwin, Larry Shay) – 4:24
8. "Shiny Stockings" (Frank Foster) – 7:20

== Personnel ==
- Jimmy McGriff – organ
- Rudolph Johnson – tenor saxophone, soprano saxophone
- Larry Frazier – guitar
- Jimmie Smith – drums
