= Nadezhda Panayotova =

Bulgarian actress (born 1979)

- Надежда Панайотова
- Born: Nadezhda Plamenova Panayotova; 26 December 1979 (age 46); Shumen, Bulgaria
- Other name: Nadejda Panaiotova
- Occupations: Actress, voice actress, and singer
- Known for: Elsa from Frozen (in Bulgarian)

Nadezhda Plamenova Panayotova (Bulgarian: Надежда Пламенова Панайотова; born 26 December 1979) is a Bulgarian actress, voice actress, and singer, best known for dubbing the voices of Elsa (Frozen), Pepa (Encanto), Rapunzel (Tangled), and Marinette Dupain-Cheng (Miraculous Ladybug) in Bulgarian.

She holds a master's degree in Public Speech, and is a lecturer in law at the Krastyo Sarafov National Theater Academy and at MONTFIZ Schools.
