= I've Got a Woman (album) =

Studio album by Jimmy McGriff
- Released: 1962
- Recorded: 1962
- Studio: New York City, NY
- Genre: Jazz
- Length: 42:31
- Label: Sue; LP /STLP 1012
- Producer: Juggy Murray

Jimmy McGriff chronology
I've Got a Woman (1962)	One of Mine (1963)

I've Got a Woman is an album by organist Jimmy McGriff recorded and released by Sue Records in 1962.

== Reception ==
Professional ratings
Review scores
Source	Rating
Allmusic	4.5/5 stars
Record Mirror	4/5 stars
The Penguin Guide to Jazz Recordings	3/4 stars

The Allmusic review by Michael Erlewine stated "McGriff's first album is great ... Hi-impact early McGriff is the still the best, and this is the album that started it all".

== Track listing ==
All compositions by Jimmy McGriff except where noted

1. "I've Got a Woman" (Ray Charles) – 4:34
2. "On the Street Where You Live" (Frederick Loewe, Alan Jay Lerner) – 3:54
3. "Satin Doll" (Duke Ellington) – 2:20
4. "'Round Midnight" (Thelonious Monk) – 5:43
5. "All About My Girl" – 3:54
6. "M.G. Blues" – 4:56
7. "Thats The Way I Feel" – 2:17
8. "After Hours" (Avery Parrish) – 6:02
9. "Flying Home" (Lionel Hampton) – 4:00
10. "Sermon" (Jimmy Smith) – 5:08

== Personnel ==
- Jimmy McGriff – organ
- Morris Dow – guitar
- Jackie Mills – drums
