= Doni (Bulgarian singer) =

Doni Добрин Димитров Векилов
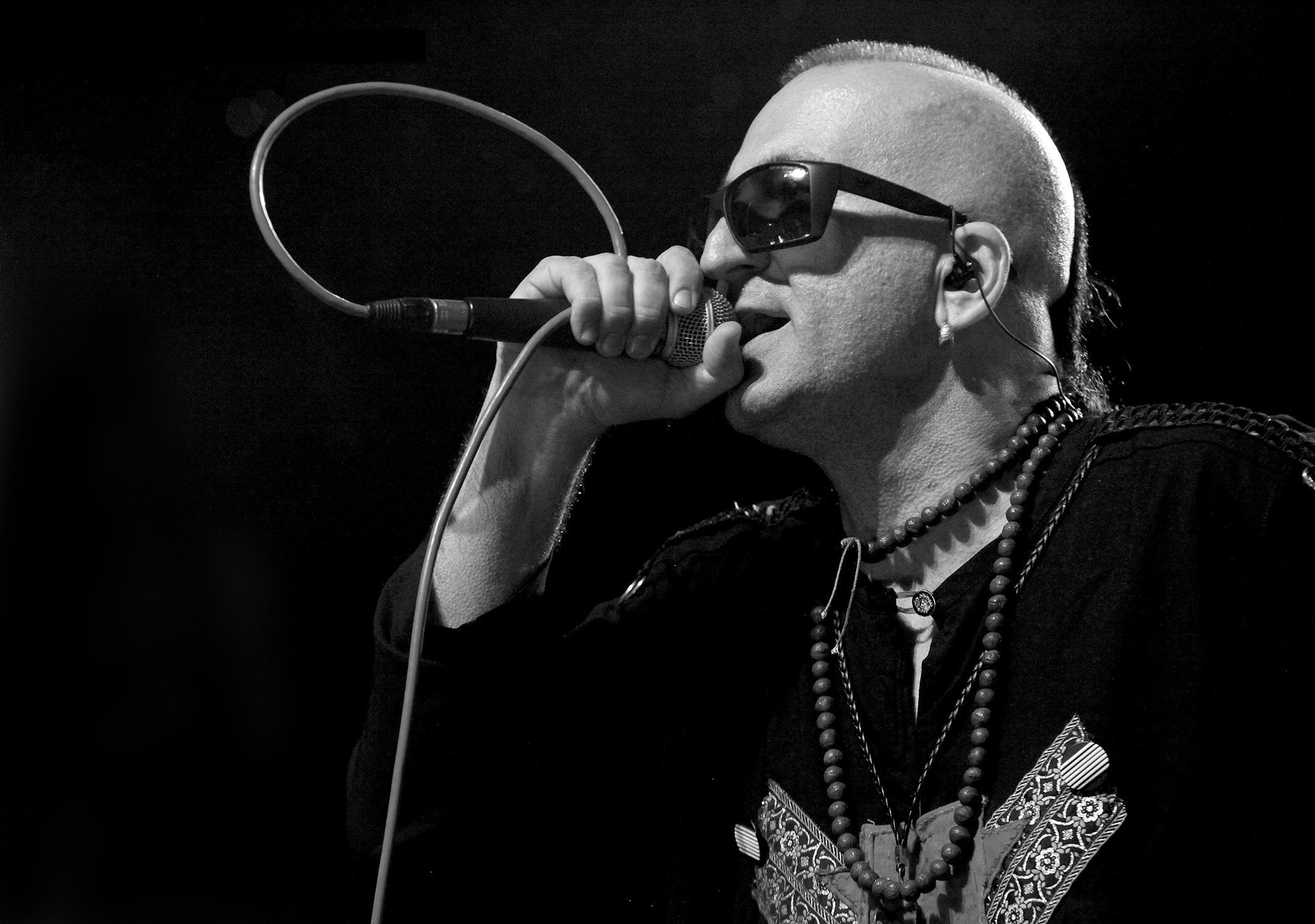

Background information
- Born: Dobrin Dimitrov Vekilov; May 7, 1966 (age 60); Sofia, Bulgaria
- Genres: Pop, pop rock
- Occupations: Singer, composer, actor
- Years active: 1989–present
- Website: www.donineti.com

Dobrin Dimitrov Vekilov (born May 7, 1967) (Bulgarian Cyrillic: Добрин Димитров Векилов), best known by his stage name Doni (Bulgarian Cyrillic: Дони, also spelled Dony), is a Bulgarian pop singer, composer and actor.

== Biography ==
Prior to turning to singing, Doni started his education as a pharmacist but his passion for music prevailed. He began studying music in 1988 and started his professional music career in the 1990s as a member of the bands "Atlas" and "Medikus". Doni subsequently formed one of the most successful musical duos in Bulgaria with Momchil Kolev or simply Momchil.

Vekilov has worked together in a musical capacity with and is married to Antoaneta Dobreva, better known by her stage name Neti, and they have a daughter. Doni and Neti have appeared in various productions, among them with the Sofia Philharmonic, including the Fortissimo Familia concert Children's Film Music, conducted by Nayden Todorov, and Oliver Twist with conductor Maxim Eshkenazy.

In his career so far, Vekilov has made 500 songs, composing more than 250 of them, while the number of those for which he has been the text writer exceeds 300.

He has from time to time been active in Bulgarian politics.
