= Lubo Kirov =

Bulgarian pop singer and music producer (born 1972)

Lubo Kirov Любо Киров
- Born: 26 October 1972 (age 53); Pleven, Bulgaria
- Genres: Pop, Pop Soul, Funk, Dance, Adult Contemporary
- Occupations: Singer, record producer
- Instruments: vocals, piano, drums
- Label: My Sound Universe
- Website: lubokirov.com

Lubomir Tsvetanov Kirov (Bulgarian: Любо Киров) is a Bulgarian pop singer and music producer. He was formerly the lead singer of the band Te and was a member of the jury in the second and third season of music show X Factor.

== Early life ==
Kirov was born in Pleven, Bulgaria and graduated from the National Academy of Arts.

== Career ==
Kirov was a some-time drummer for the Doom Metal group Mortal Remains, and later became part of the group Mr. White, which recorded the single "Something funny."

From 2000 to 2007 he was part of the group TE who released two albums – "Pronouns" and "Different" containing songs including "Are there flowers" "I'll find you", "I", "All Right" ( with Maria Ilieva) "other". TE was awarded the First Prize at the International Media Festival "Albena" in the "Concerts" for the realization of "TE Unplugged" DVD. During the same period, Kirov participated in music events including concerts Simply Red, Incognito, Al McKay's Earth Wind And Fire Experience, Simple Minds. The group took part in various initiatives and campaigns including "Sport against drugs" and "Bulgaria in the EU" in Brussels.

In the spring of 2007 Lubo left the band TE and launched his solo career. His first solo single – "Again, I believe" – won the radio competition "Golden Spring". In 2010 Lubo released his first solo album, "Lubo 2010" which includes songs "I Can", "Govori Mi na Ti" "You and I" (with people from the ghetto), "Na Kraya na Sveta", "Forbidden love" (as the eponymous series of New TV), and "Tonight" (with Italian singer Alessia D'Andrea).

Kirov has participated as guest vocalist in various musical projects. His joint project with Zhivko Petrov, "Life is beautiful" became quite popular with its video reaching over 1 million views.

In 2021 and 2022, Kirov was a judge on The Voice of Bulgaria.

== Filmography ==
- Peesh ili luzhesh (season 1, guest artist)

== Discography ==
- Pronouns (2001) – Pop Different
- Different (2003) – Pop
- Te Unplugged (2005) -Pop, Live
- Lubo 2010 (2010) – Pop, by "Lubo Productions"
- Life Is Beautiful (2011) – by Lubo & JP, Dance/House
- I Can't Get Over (2012) – Mr.Moon & Lubo Kirov, чрез "Stimulated Soul Recordings"

== Awards ==
- 2014– Artist of the Year (БГ радио)
- 2012 – Best Artist (Artist of the Year)(БГ радио)
- 2007 – Best Song (BNR)
- 2005 – Best Group(БГ радио)
- 2004 – Best live performance (BG Radio)
- 2003 – Best Group (Melo TV Mania Music Awards)
- 2003 – Best Music (Melo TV Mania Music Awards)
- 2002 – Super Group Bulgaria (БГ радио)
- 2002 – Best Group (Bulgarian TOP 100 Music Awards)
- 2001 – Best Newcomer (Melo TV Mania Music Awards)
