= FSB (band) =

Bulgarian progressive rock band

- Origin: Sofia, Bulgaria
- Genres: Progressive rock; progressive pop
- Years active: 1975–1996; 2007–present
- Labels: Kontrapunkti
- Members: Konstantin Tsekov; Rumen Boyadzhiev; Ivan Lechev
- Past members: Aleksandar Baharov; Peter Slavov; Ivaylo Kraychovski
- Website: music.fsb.bg

FSB (Bulgarian: ФСБ) (abbreviation for Formation Studio Balkanton) are a Bulgarian progressive rock band formed in 1975 in Sofia as a studio project. FSB achieved great success in the 1980s and performed in numerous countries across Europe. Their collaboration with singer Jose Feliciano resulted in the album I'm Never Gonna Change and a Grammy award in 1990.

== Current members ==
- Rumen Boyadzhiev — vocals, keyboards (1975–present)
- Konstantin Tsekov — keyboards, vocals (1975–present)
- Ivan Lechev — guitar (1979–present)

== Former members ==
- Aleksandar Baharov — bass (1975–1983)
- Peter Slavov — drums (1979–2006, d.2008)
- Ivaylo Kraychovski — bass (1983–2007, d.2018)

== Discography ==
Year	Title
1978	Non-Stop
1979	FSB 2
1980	The Globe
1981	78 RPM
1983	Ten Years Later
1983	FSB VI
1985	FSB na koncert — FSB In Concert
1987	I Love You Up To Here
1989	Niama kak/Visoko EP
1990	FSB
1992	Attempt at flying
1995	Wolfish times
1995	Wind is coming
1995	The last Man
2010	FSB.
