= Glasat na Bulgaria (TV series) =

- Гласът на България
- Genre: Reality television
- Created by: John de Mol Jr. Roel van Velzen
- Presented by: Marten Roberto; Victoria Terziyska; Yana Marinova; Pavell; Venci Venc'; Ivan Tishev; Vladimir Zombori; Boryana Bratoeva
- Judges: Mariana Popova; Kiril Marichkov; Ivana; Miro; Preslava; Yordan Karadjov; Victoria Terziyska; Atanas Penev; Desi Slava; Orlin Goranov; Kamelia; Ivan Lechev; Poli Genova; Grafa; Mihaela Fileva; Dara; Galena; Lubo Kirov; Maria Ilieva; Medi
- Country of origin: Bulgaria
- Original language: Bulgarian
- No. of seasons: 12
- No. of episodes: 204

Production
- Production locations: Seven-Eight Productions (1–3); MediaPro Entertainment (2–3) bTV Studios (4–)
- Running time: 150 minutes
- Production companies: Talpa Media Group (2011–2019); ITV Studios (2020–present)

Original release
- Network: bTV
- Release: 18 July 2011 – present

Glasat na Bulgaria (Bulgarian: Гласът на България) is a Bulgarian reality singing competition and local version of The Voice of Holland. Its first season was held in the summer of 2011 on bTV. One of the show's important premises is the singing talent's quality. Four coaches (popular performing artists) train the talents in their group and occasionally perform with them. Talents are selected in blind auditions, where the coaches cannot see, but only hear the auditioner.

== Format ==
The series consists of the following phases.

=== Blind auditions ===
In this stage, four coaches, all noteworthy recording artists, form a team of artists. Each coach has the length of the auditionee's performance to decide if they want that singer on their team. If more than one coach want the same singer, the singer decides which team they join.

From season 4 onwards, when the contestant fails to turn any chair, the contestant would leave the stage without having a conversation with the coaches.

Starting in season 6, a new element has been added: the block button. Three smaller buttons allow one coach to block any of the other three to prevent them from getting an artist. In season 7, when the blocked coach tried to turn around for the contestant, their chair did not turn around. In season 10, the super-block rule was applied - a coach can be blocked only after they turned around and the audition ended, then their chair will turn to the audience again. In season 11 two coaches could be blocked in the same audition. In season 12 each coach had one block and one super-block.

In season 11 the Super Pass was introduced. Each coach can press this Button once in the Blind Auditions and while the other coaches get blocked, the contestants goes starlight to The Battles.

==== Final selection ====
From season 8 onwards, coaches have the freedom to select an unlimited number of contestants to form their respective teams. However, the number of contestants on the team will be finalized by cutting them down to 12 (14 in season 8).

From season 8 to season 10, the coach had to tell each contestant if they will continue in the show, dirrectly giving them "yes" or "no".

From season 11, the coaches first had to appoint a group of artists who are definetely going to the battles. Then each contestant from the other group had to sing acapella a song of their choice with the best of them taking the final spots on the team.

=== Battles ===
Each team of singers is mentored and developed by its respective coach. In the second stage, called the "battles", coaches pair their team members, who battle against each other directly by singing the same song together.

The coach chooses which artist advances into the next round. Nevertheless, starting in season 2, a new power is added during this phase: the steal. Each coach is given one or two "steals" to save an artist from another team who lost their respective battle. From season 9 to season 11, the non-stop steal was featured. Each artist that is stolen will sit in a designated seat, on the backstage, but if the coach decides to steal another one, the former will be eliminated and replaced by the latter. Season 10 introduced a new rule for only this season, where each coach can save both his artists from only one battle and advance them both to the knockouts.

=== Super battles ===
The "super battles" round was implemented in seasons 4 and 5. The participants who remained after the battles are grouped into trios. Each artist had to sing, a song of their choice, in order to convince their respective coach to pick them for the live shows.

=== Knockouts ===
In season 6, the "knockouts" replaced the "super battles". In this round, three chairs are placed on the stage to be seated by contestants. After the artist performs a song of their choice, the coach will decide if the artist will be going forward to the next round, by giving them a chair, or if the artist will go home, by not giving them a chair. If the three chairs are filled and the coach wants to give a chair to another artist, they are sitting on the given chair and the person previously sitting on the third and last seat is eliminated. At the end of this round, three artists per team will be moved to the live shows.

In season 10 the format of the round was changed. Each coach will divide their 8 singers into 4 pairs. The performers from each pair will compete against each other by performing a song of their choice one after the other on stage. At the end, it's the coach who decides the contestant, continuing to the Live shows.

In season 11 the rules were changed again: after each contestant's solo performance, the respective coach will have to decide either the artist qualify for the next round, is directly eliminated, or is sent to the "Danger Zone" – at risk of elimination. Each coach have one steal to use across the round for the eliminated contestants or in the "Danger Zone". After all members from one team have concluded their performances, the coach will save a number of artists from the "Danger Zone" to move on to the Playoffs. Contestants who are sent to the "Danger Zone" and not chosen by their coach are eliminated, but have a chance to be saved. Also, each coach set a theme for the songs, but each contestant would choose their song.

=== Live shows ===
In the live shows, the surviving acts from each team again perform and the public votes for their favorite, in order to advance to the next episode. Out of the artists that did not receive the most votes, the coach chooses which of them continue on the competition. In the finale, the outcome is solely decided by public vote.

In season eight, a new stage was introduced, the "live cross-battles" (which replaced the knockouts in the ninth season). An artist would be chosen by their coach to compete against an artist from another team. The selection of the artists and their order of appearance were all decided by their respective coaches, and all of them were done without the knowledge of the opposing coach. Therefore, the battle pairings were completely random, and would only be revealed when the coaches appeared with their selected artists on stage. The winner of each battle would be determined via public votes. Due to this round, it would not be guaranteed if a coach would have a remaining contestant to fight for in the final, which happened for the first time in the show with Lubo Kirov's team in the eighth season.

From the ninth season, on the semi-final the public determined the finalists, no matter the team, which ment that not every coach could have a finalist, which happened in the tenth season and the eleventh season with Ivan Lechev's team.

In season 11, the Playoffs were introduced. From each team, two artists advanced to the semi-final from the public vote and one artist advances by the coach's choice with a total of 12 contestants moving to the semi-final.

== Coaches ==
=== Coaches' timeline ===
| Coaches | Seasons | | | | | | | | | | | |
| Coaches | 1 | 2 | 3 | 4 | 5 | 6 | 7 | 8 | 9 | 10 | 11 | 12 |
|---|---|---|---|---|---|---|---|---|---|---|---|---|
| Miro | | | | | | | | | | | | |
| Kiril Marichkov^{†} | | | | | | | | | | | | |
| Ivana | | | | | | | | | | | | |
| Mariana Popova | | | | | | | | | | | | |
| Yordan Karadjov | | | | | | | | | | | | |
| Preslava | | | | | | | | | | | | |
| Victoria Terziyska | | | | | | | | | | | | |
| Orlin Goranov | | | | | | | | | | | | |
| Desi Slava | | | | | | | | | | | | |
| Atanas Penev | | | | | | | | | | | | |
| Ivan Lechev | | | | | | | | | | | | |
| Grafa | | | | | | | | | | | | |
| Kamelia | | | | | | | | | | | | |
| Poli Genova | | | | | | | | | | | | |
| Mihaela Fileva | | | | | | | | | | | | |
| Dara | | | | | | | | | | | | |
| Galena | | | | | | | | | | | | |
| Lubo Kirov | | | | | | | | | | | | |
| Maria Ilieva | | | | | | | | | | | | |
| Medi | | | | | | | | | | | | |

Coaches gallery

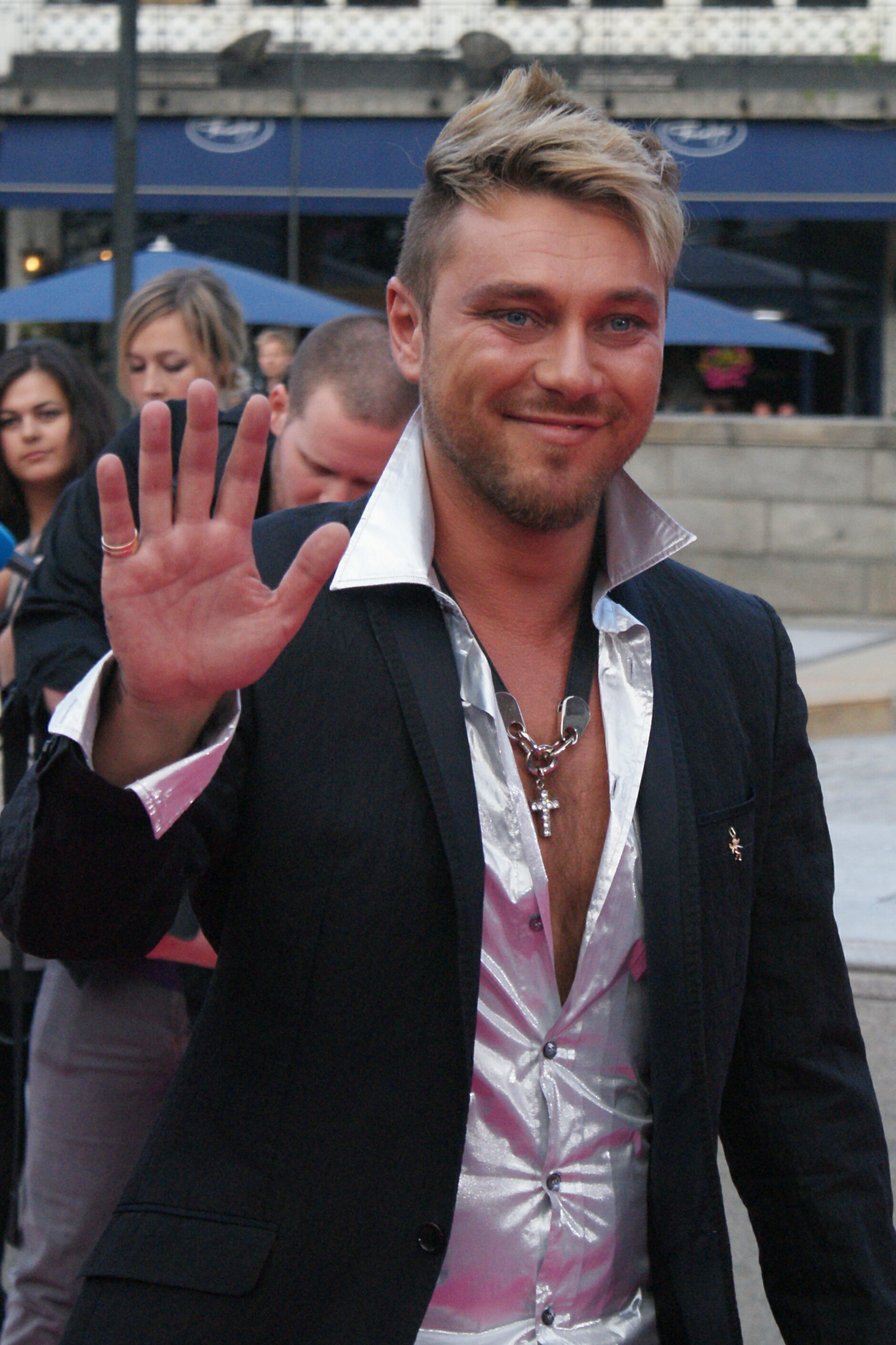
Miro (1–3, 10)

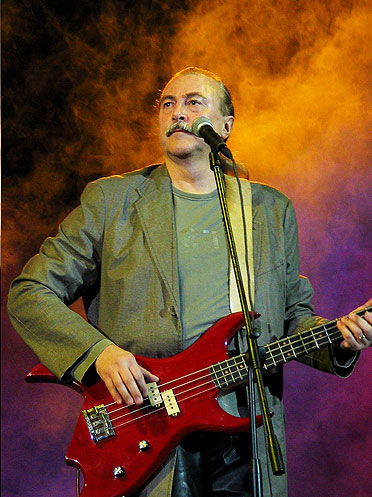
Kiril Marichkov^{†} (1)

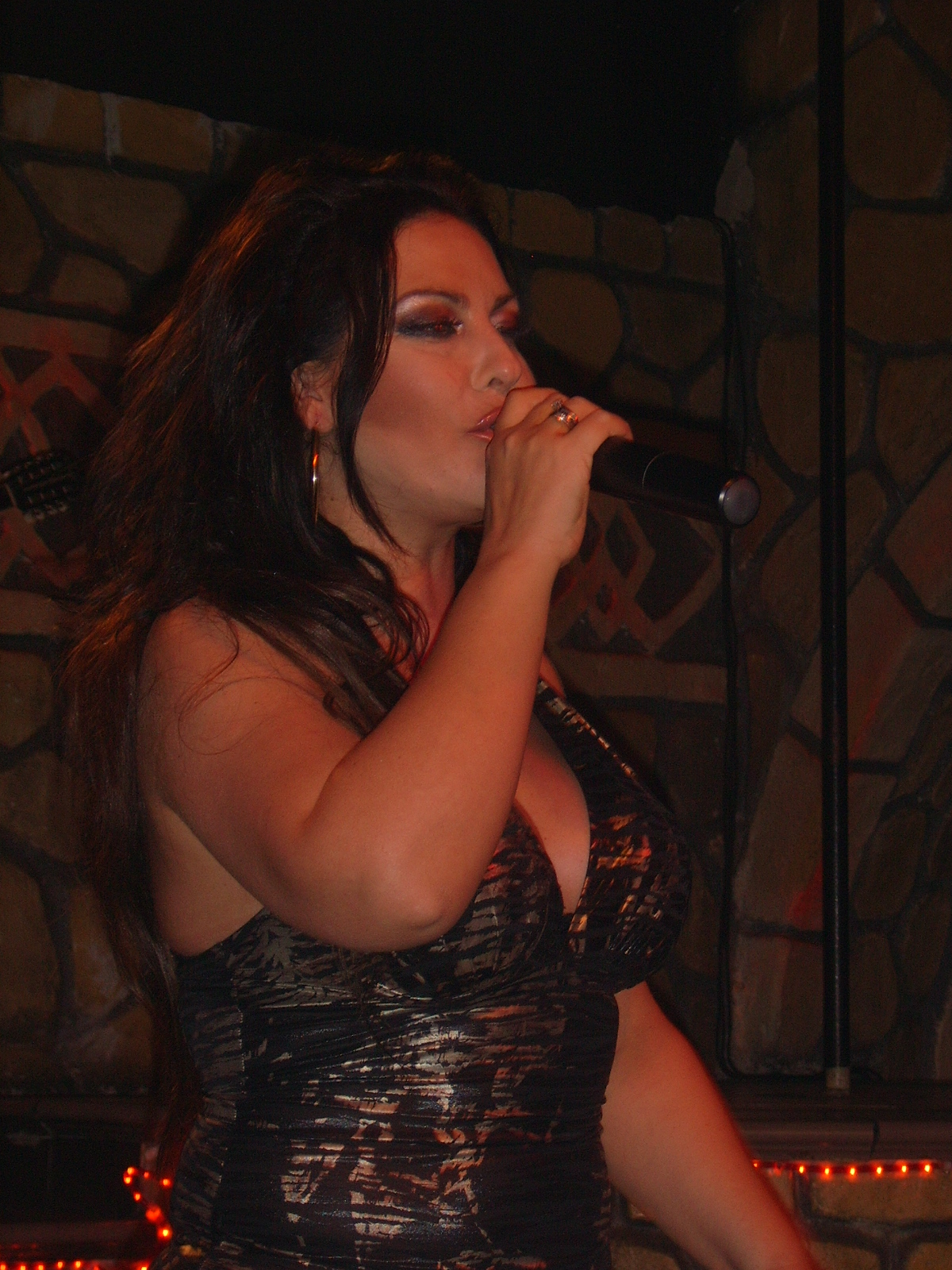
Ivana (1)

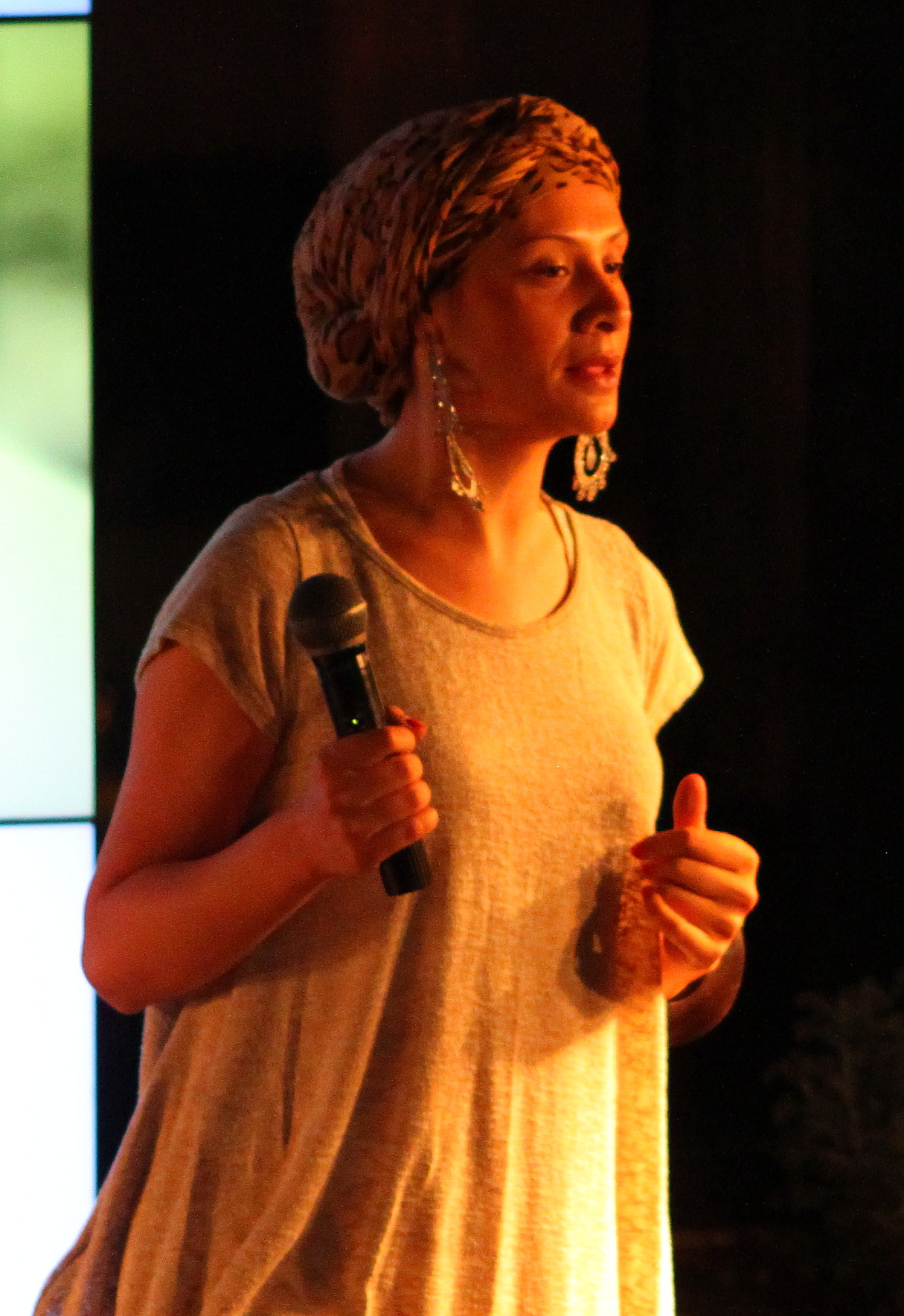
Mariana Popova (1)

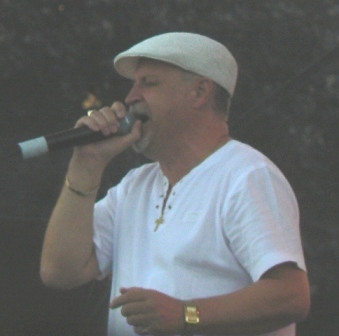
Yordan Karadjov (2)

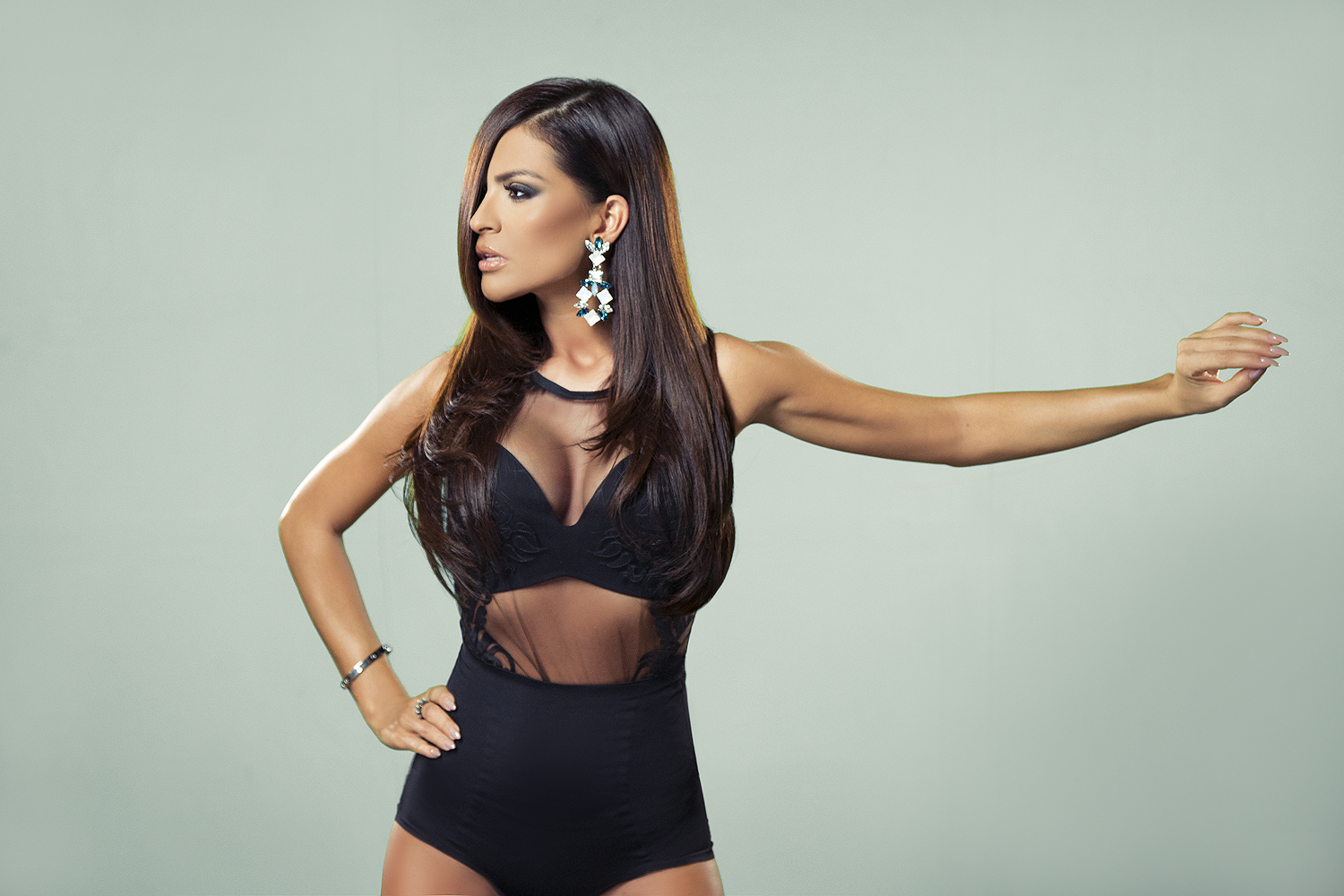
Preslava (2)

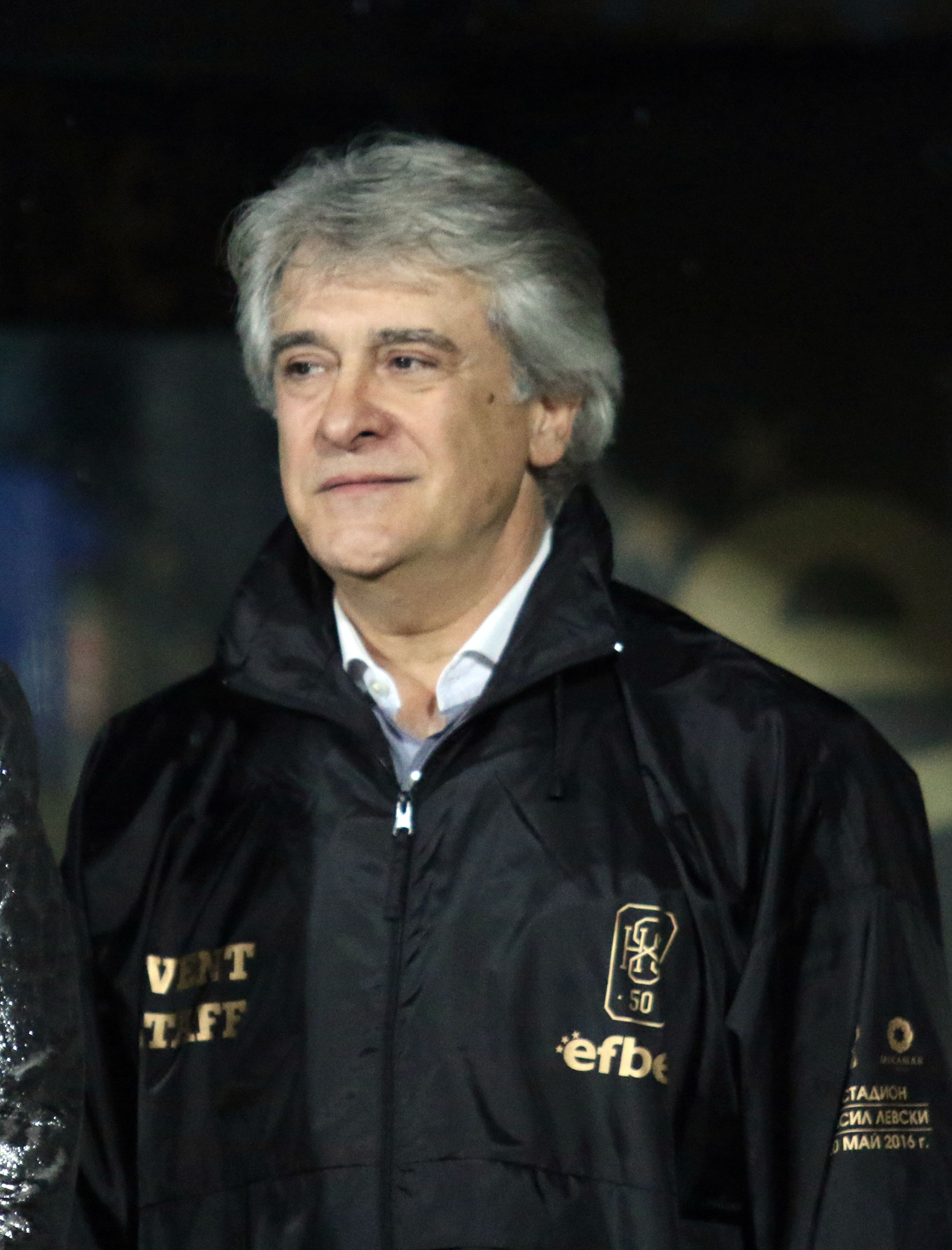
Orlin Goranov (3)

Desi Slava (3)

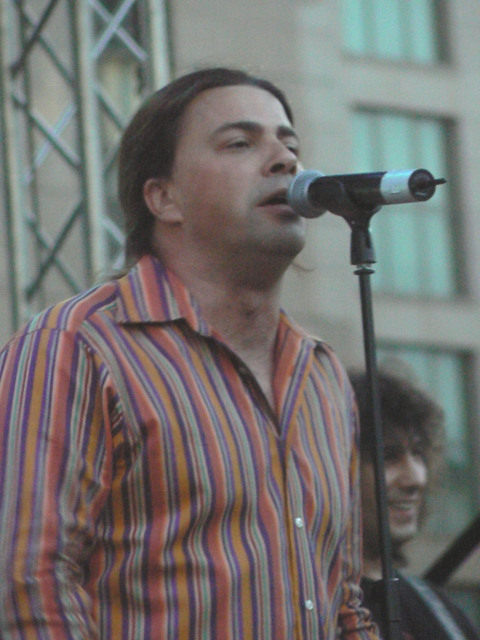
Atanas Penev (3)

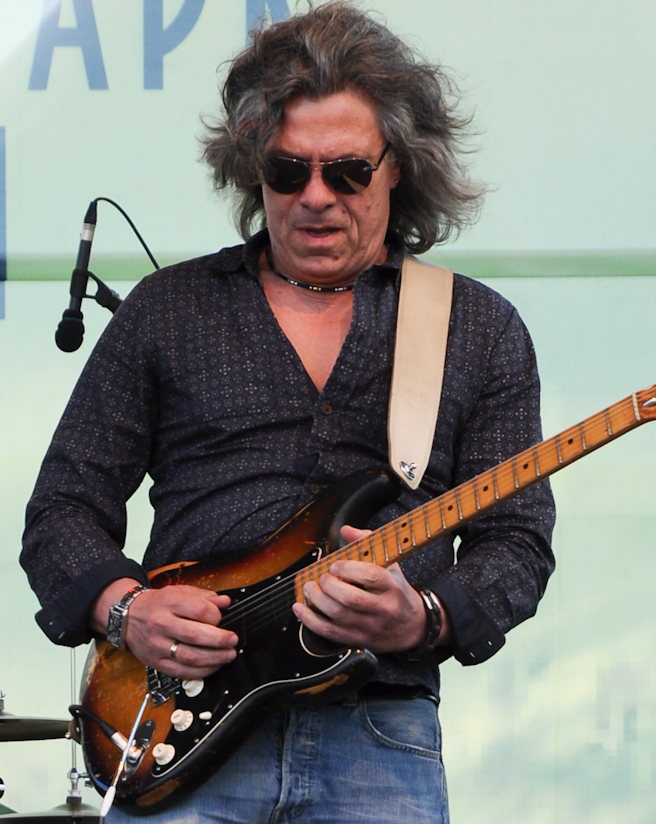
Ivan Lechev (4–)

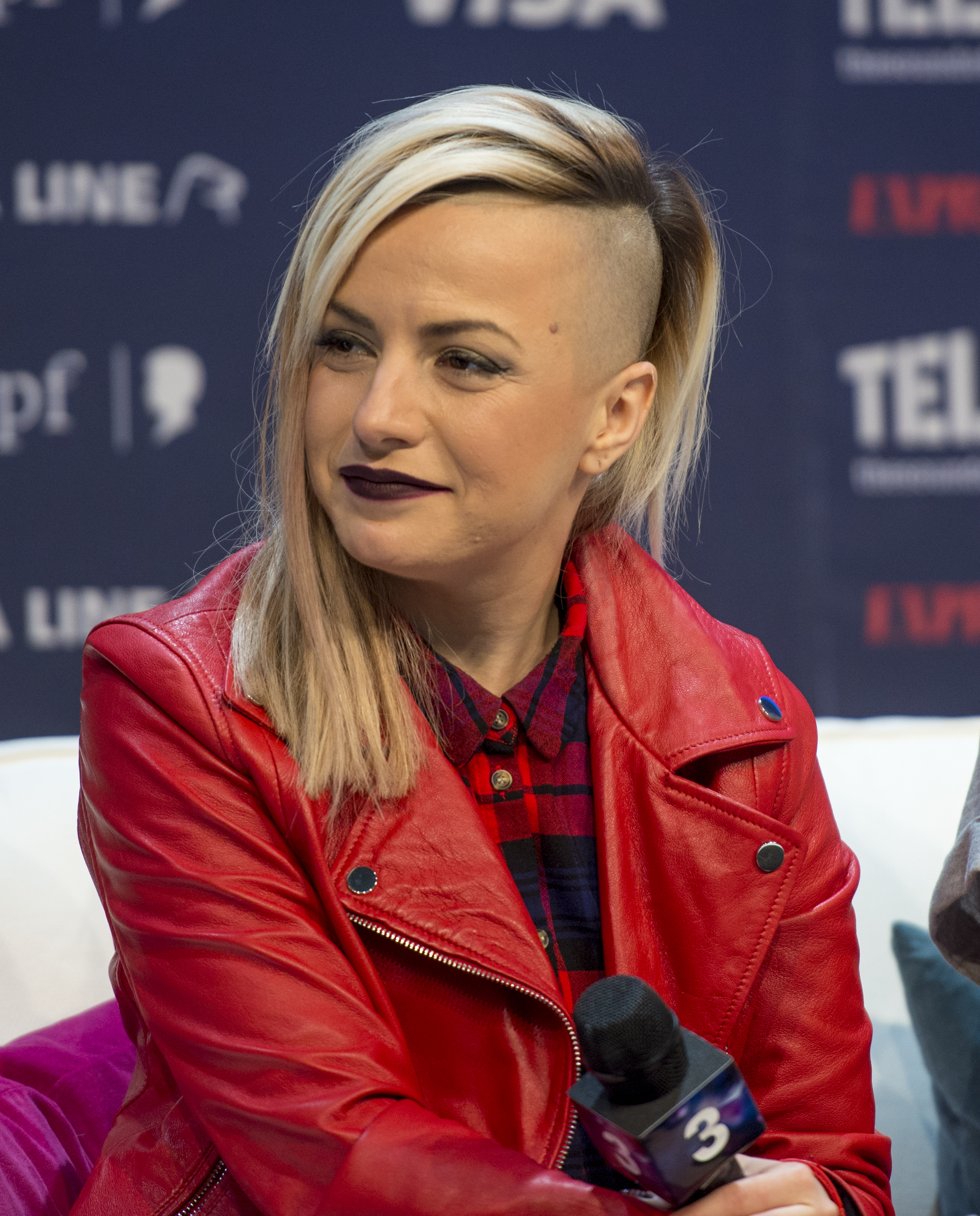
Poli Genova (4–5)

Kamelia (4–7)

Grafa (4–7, 11)

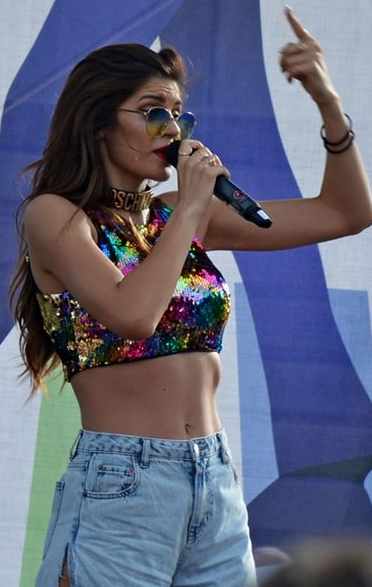
Mihaela Fileva (6–7)

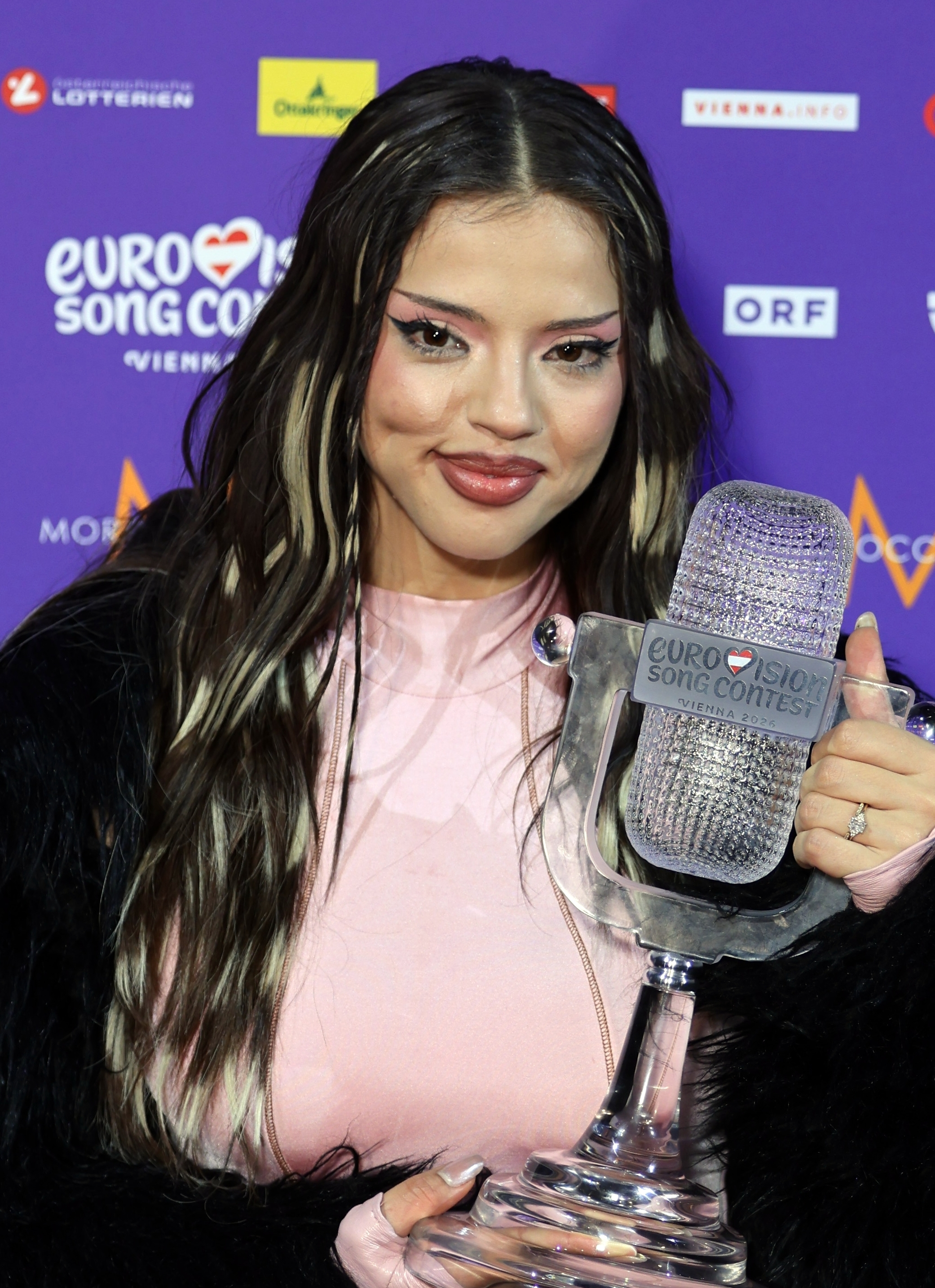
Dara (8–)

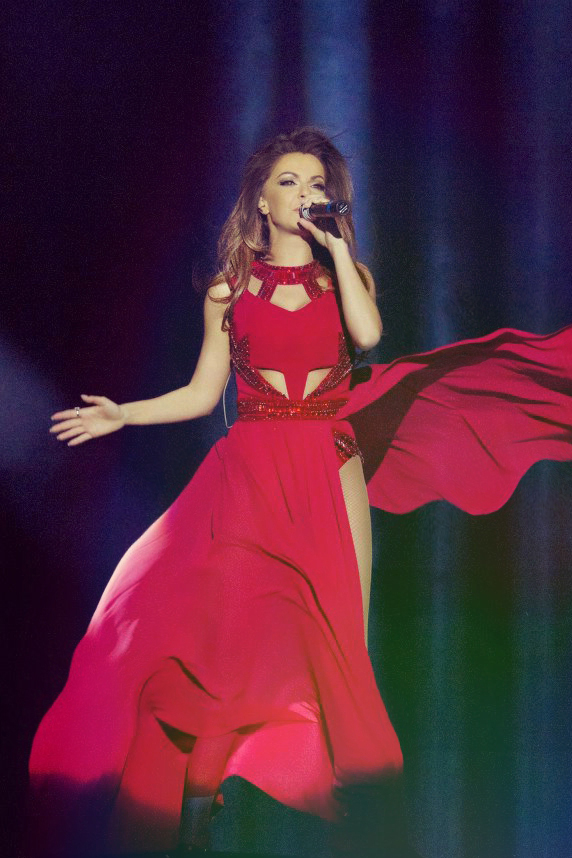
Galena (8–9)

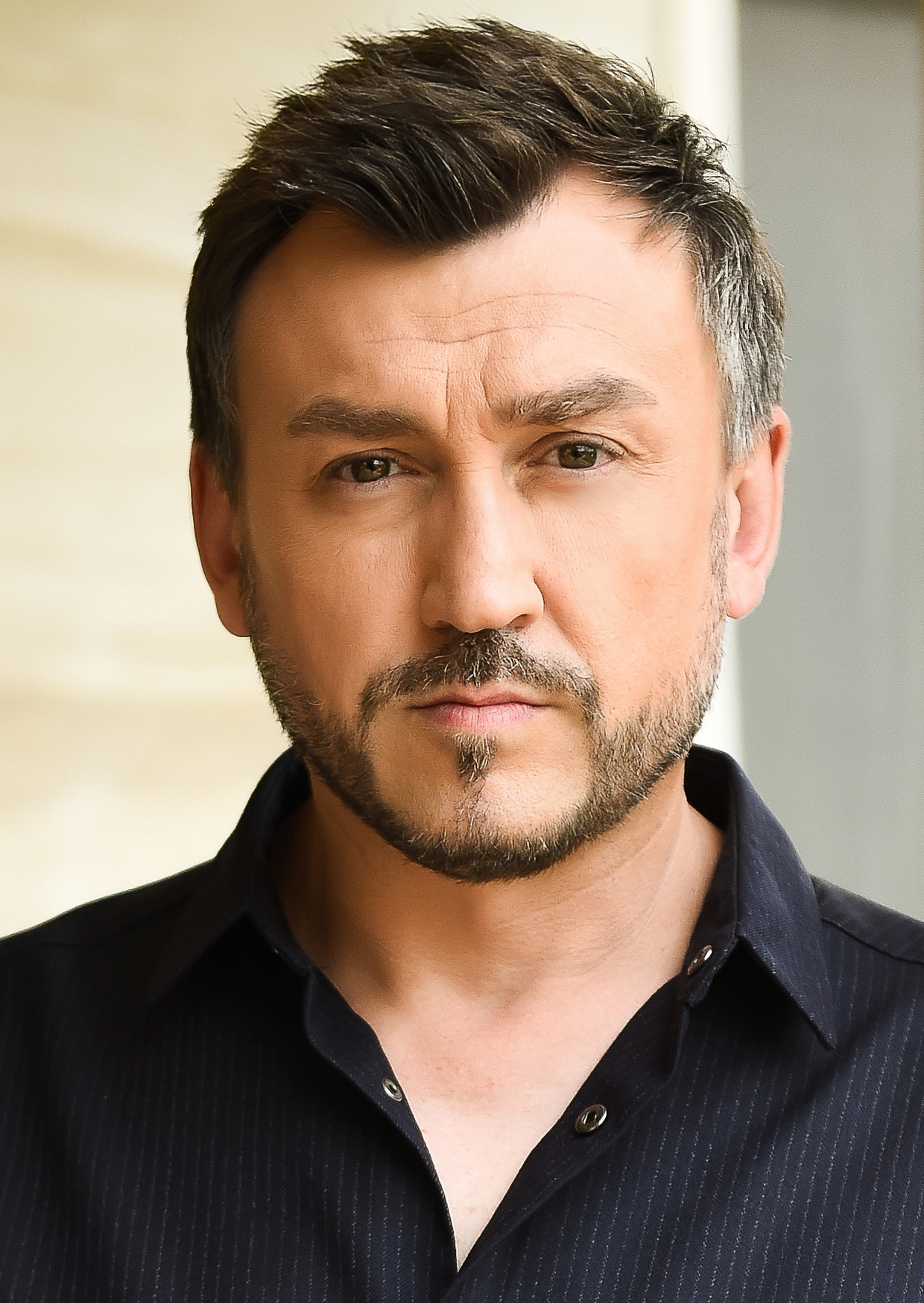
Lubo Kirov (8–9)

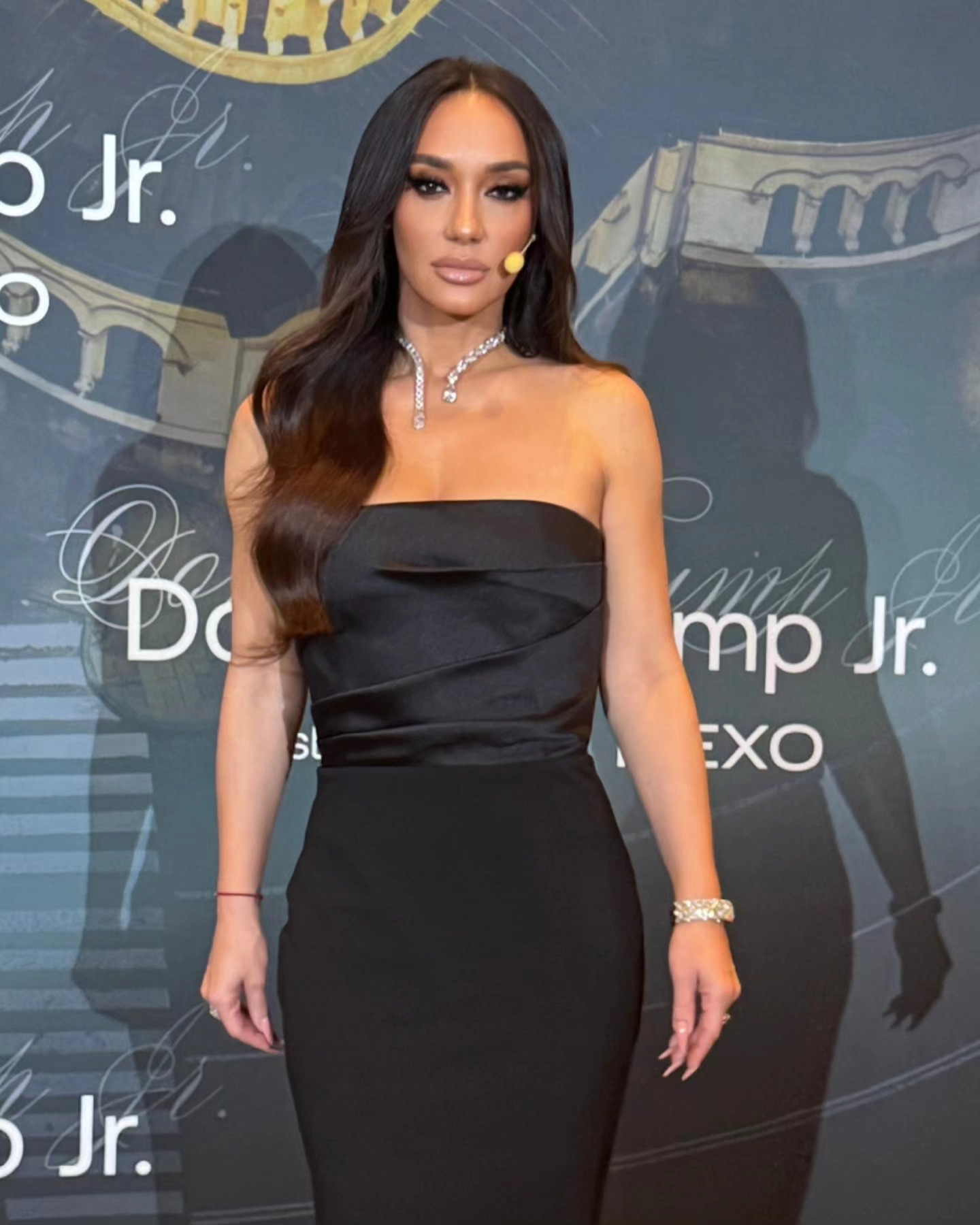
Maria Ilieva (10–)

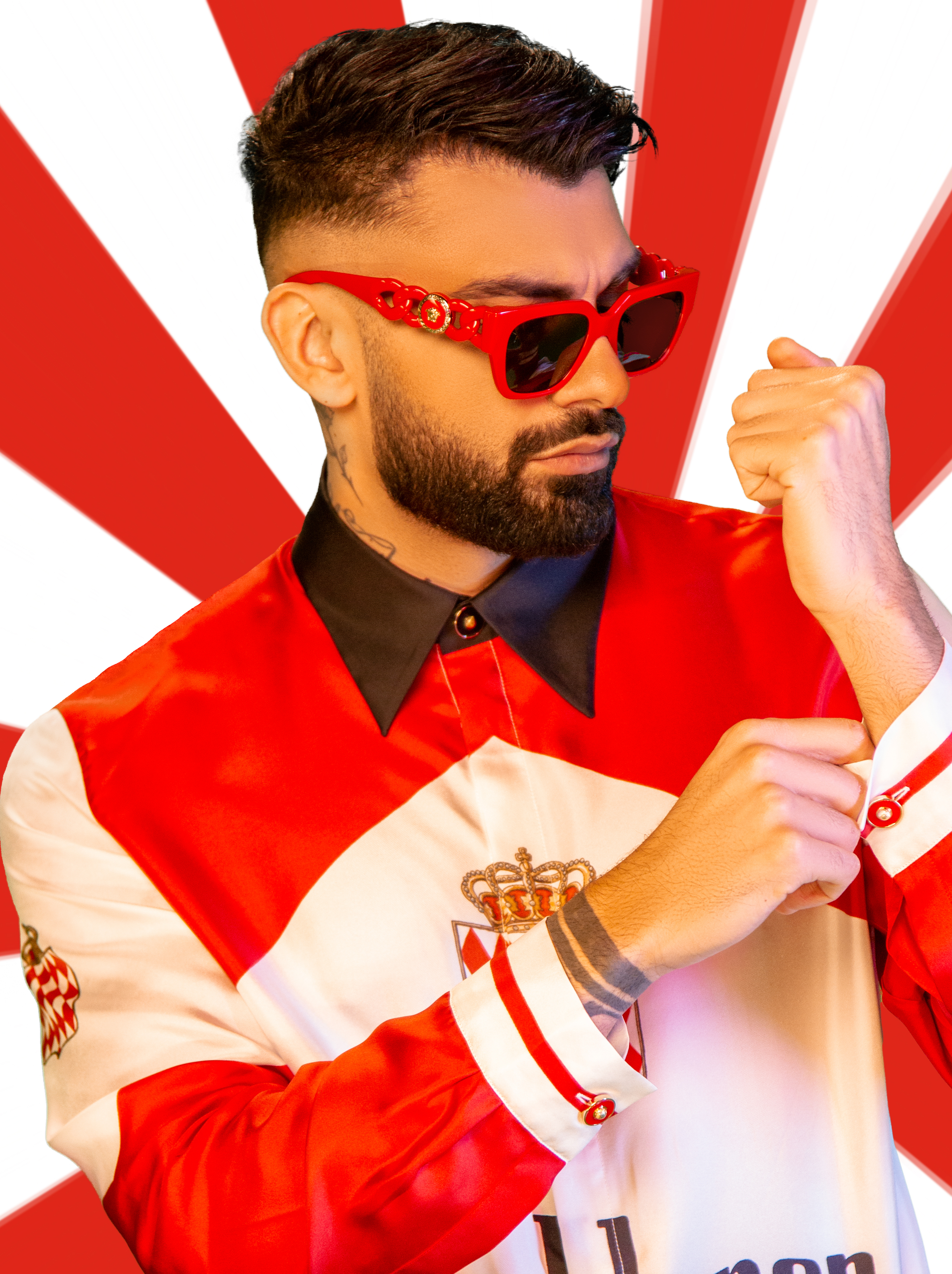
Medi (12–)

=== Line-up of coaches ===
Coaches' line-up by chairs order
| Season | Year | Coaches | | | |
| Season | Year | 1 | 2 | 3 | 4 |
|---|---|---|---|---|---|
| 1 | 2011 | Kiril | Ivana | Miro | Mariana |
| 2 | 2013 | Yordan | Preslava | Victoria | Miro |
| 3 | 2014 | Orlin | Desi | Atanas | Miro |
| 4 | 2017 | Ivan | Poli | Kamelia | Grafa |
| 5 | 2018 | Ivan | Poli | Kamelia | Grafa |
| 6 | 2019 | Ivan | Mihaela | Kamelia | Grafa |
| 7 | 2020 | Ivan | Mihaela | Kamelia | Grafa |
| 8 | 2021 | Ivan | Dara | Galena | Lubo |
| 9 | 2022 | Ivan | Dara | Galena | Lubo |
| 10 | 2023 | Ivan | Dara | Maria | Miro |
| 11 | 2024 | Ivan | Dara | Maria | Grafa |
| 12 | 2026 | Ivan | Dara | Maria | Medi |

=== Coaches' advisors ===
| Season | Battles advisors | | | | Mega mentor |
| Season | Team Kiril | Team Ivana | Team Miro | Team Mariana | All coaches |
|---|---|---|---|---|---|
| 1 | Mitko Shterev | Galya Kurdova | Yordan Karadzhov, Evgeni Dimitrov – Maestroto | Adelina Koleva, Lili Vateva | |
| 2 | Team Yordan | Team Preslava | Team Victoria | Team Miro | |
| 2 | Adelina Koleva, Vladimir Dimov, Evgeni Dimitrov – Maestroto | | | | |
| 3 | Team Orlin | Team Desi | Team Atanas | Team Miro | |
| 3 | Adelina Koleva, Vladimir Dimov | | | | |
| 4 | Team Ivan | Team Poli | Team Kamelia | Team Grafa | |
| 4 | | Lubo Kirov (Super Battles) | | | |
| 5 | | Maria Ilieva | | Mihaela Fileva | |
| 6 | Team Ivan | Team Mihaela | Team Kamelia | Team Grafa | |
| 6 | Stefan Valdobrev | Orlin Pavlov | Desi Slava | Maria Ilieva | |
| 8 | Team Ivan | Team Dara | Team Galena | Team Lubo | All coaches |
| 8 | Atanas Penev | Doni | Medi, Georgi Simeonov | Maria Ilieva | Ishtar (Knockouts) |
| 9 | Alexandrina Pendatchanska | Mihaela Marinova | Desi Slava | Nina Nikolina | |
| 10 | Team Ivan | Team Dara | Team Maria | Team Miro | All coaches |
| 10 | Mihaela Fileva | Molets | Lubo Kirov | Ivana | |
| 11 | Team Ivan | Team Dara | Team Maria | Team Grafa | All coaches |
| 11 | Margarita Hranova | Galena | Jivko Petrov | Tino | Orlin Goranov (Semi-final) |
| 12 | Team Ivan | Team Dara | Team Maria | Team Medi | All coaches |
| 12 | Orlin Goranov | Doni | Papi Hans | Sofi Marinova | |

=== Coaches and their finalists ===
Winner
Runner-up
Third place
Fourth place

| Season | Coaches | | | |
| Season | Kiril Marichkov | Ivana | Miro | Mariana Popova |
|---|---|---|---|---|
| 1 | Igor Shabov; Valentina Dimitrova; Ani Sarandeva; Radoslav Gergov; Rafaela Koseva; Boyan Mihaylov | Antoaneta Linkova; Gergana Koeva; Nevena Peykova; Aleksandar Baychev; Nargiz Saidova; Radina Atanasova | Todor Gadzhalov; Elitsa Naumova; Melinda Hristova; Sevinch Ibrahim; Kristina Avramova; Viktoria Gyurova | Steliyana Hristova; Nevena Koleva; Georgi Dyulgerov; Bogdana Mitova; Gergana Ruseva; Tsvetana Dicheva |
| 2 | Yordan Karadjov | Preslava | Victoria Terziyska | Miro |
| 2 | Krasimira Ivanova; Hristo Mladenov; Miroslav Tsankov; Stanislava Semova; Gita Petkova; Yanitsa Rageva; Nikolina Atanasova; Boryana Boneva | Todor Georgiev; Sashka Aleksandrova; Tsvetelin Nikolov; Petar Rangelov; Kristian Dimitrov; Nyagoleta Zheleva; Elena Katrankyovska; Plamen Borisov | Vasil Chergov; Nina Ilieva; Nikoleta Stanoykova; Nadezhda Dimitrova; Dilyana Yordanova; Madlen Kovacheva; Mariela Gosheva; Teni Omede | Ivaylo Donkov; Vasya Popova; Ventsislav Katov; Nevena Dimitrova; Galina Makaveeva; Emilia Valenti; Hristo Mihaylov; Margarita Incheva |
| 3 | Orlin Goranov | Desi Slava | Atanas Penev | Miro |
| 3 | Anna Pesheva; Petar Rangelov; Tyurkyan Ismail; Sabina Doneva; Dani Chukov; Ivan Chenov; Stanislav Georgiev-Siso; Biserka Mladenova | Kristina Ivanova; Iveta Kostova; Asen Mihaylov; Viktoria Peneva; Selim Mirov; Svetoslav Vladimirov; Tihomir Tsonev; Mila Zheleva | Ati Molova; Stefani Ilieva; Maria Marinova; Yana Kamenova; Krum Filipov; Venetsia Netsova; Marieta Petrakieva; Dilyana Yordanova | Nevena Tsoneva; Zoya Mutisheva; Hristiyana Dankova; Svetlana Cheprazova; Ivelina Dolapchieva; Ogi Georgiev; Lazar Kisyov; Sonya Ivanova |
| 4 | Ivan Lechev | Poli Genova | Kamelia | Grafa |
| 4 | Radko Petkov; Dimitar Atanasov & Hristo Mladenov; Maria Dimova «Mia D» | Sarah Suzette; Simona Zagorova; Dea Maistorska | Kristina Kabadieva; Paulina Goranov; Elena Freymann | Yana Sabanova; Kristian Grancharov; Ivaylo Filipov |
| 5 | Nia Petrova; Nikola Zdravkov; Trio Trinity; Simona Zaharieva | Viktoria Dinkova; Aleksandar Savov; Anna Azatyan; Anastasia Belyavskaya | Olivia Nikolova; Nikola Chochev; Nikol Todorova; Gergana Velikova | Rafael Pasamov; Maria Pashalyska; Yagoda Treneva; Simeon Zhelyazkov |
| 6 | Ivan Lechev | Mihaela Fileva | Kamelia | Grafa |
| 6 | Iva Georgieva; Nikolay Vodenicharov-Niketsa; Simona Simeonova | Nadezhda Aleksandrova; Hristian Nenov; Veniamin Dimitrov | Kiril Hadzhiev-Tino; Maria Velichkova; Todor Simeonov | Atanas Kateliev; Galina Krasimirova; Ivana Mutskova |
| 7 | Georgi Shopov; Plamen Bonev; Kalina Velkovska | Elena Sirakova; Ilin Papazyan; Svetoslav Georgiev | Kerana; Kristina Doncheva; Hristo Vasilev | Joana Sashova; Alexandar Georgiev; Alexandar Slavchev; Ivan Lazarov |
| 8 | Ivan Lechev | Dara | Galena | Lubo Kirov |
| 8 | Boris Hristov; Raya Dimitrova; Ivan Ivanov | Lidiya Ganeva; Daniel Staykov; Hristina Yosifova | Petya Paneva; Georgi Kostadinov; Ekaterina Sava | Ivan Ivanov; Stefan Zdravkovic; Jamie Rashed |
| 9 | Desislava Latinova; Boyan Boev; Nicola Stoyanov; Tsvetelina Petrova | Jacklyn Tarrakci; Silvi Philip | Alexandar Petrov; Sonya Mihailova; Elizabeth Zaharieva; Maxim Panayotov; Misher | Kaloyan Nikolov; Victor Stambolov; Boris Lapshov; Nadezhda Bogoeva |
| 10 | Ivan Lechev | Dara | Maria Ilieva | Miro |
| 10 | Georgi Georgiev; Kaloyan Paunov; Maria Koleva; Zornitsa Petrova | Nikola Yanakiev; Arcangelo D'Angelo; Valeria Voykova; Aleksandra Georgieva | Dimitrina Germanova; Simeon Slavev; Aleksandra Borisova; Marin Rusinov | Nadezhda Kovacheva; Elena Popova; Yanitsa Kaneva; Alexander Kolev |
| 11 | Ivan Lechev | Dara | Maria Ilieva | Grafa |
| 11 | Victoria Blagoeva; Yoana Marinova; Simona Stateva; Raya Yovcheva | Slaveya Ivanova; Yordan Petev; Yana Dimitrova; Nedko Geshev | David Milanov; Jacklyn Kostadinova; Aleksandar Savov; Maria Mironova | Anna Stavreva; Trio Fida; Samuel Manuelyan; Aleksandar Atanasov |
| 12 | Ivan Lechev | Dara | Maria Ilieva | Medi |
| 12 | | | Martina Gospodinova; Trio Deja Vu; Zheni Krincheva | Nikola Popov; Krum Krumov; Diana Dimitrova |

== Presenters ==
Key
Main presenter
Online backstage presenter
TV backstage presenter

Presenters timeline
| Presenter | Seasons | | | | | | | | | | | |
| Presenter | 1 | 2 | 3 | 4 | 5 | 6 | 7 | 8 | 9 | 10 | 11 | 12 |
|---|---|---|---|---|---|---|---|---|---|---|---|---|
| Victoria Terziyska | | Coach | Live shows | | | | | | | | | |
| Marten Roberto | Live shows | | | | | | | | | | | |
| Emanuela Ivanova | | | | | | | | | | | | |
| Gencho Genchev | | | | | | | | | | | | |
| Yana Marinova | | Live shows | | | | | | | | | | |
| Pavell | | | | | | | | | | | | |
| Venci Venc' | | | | | | | | | | | | |
| Todor Georgiev-Toshey | | | | | | | | | | | | |
| Elina Markovska | | | | | | | | | | | | |
| Aleksandra Bogdanska | | | | | | | | | | | | |
| Ivan Tishev | | | | | | | | | | | | |
| Preyah | | | | | | | | | | | | |
| Vladimir Zombori | | | | | | | | | | | | |
| Boryana Bratoeva | | | | | | | | | | | | |
| Petya Dikova | | | | | | | | | | | | |

== Series overview ==
Warning: the following table presents a significant amount of different colors.

Teams color key
| Artist from Team Kiril | Artist from Team Atanas | Artist from Team Mihaela |
| Artist from Team Ivana | Artist from Team Desi | Artist from Team Dara |
| Artist from Team Miro | Artist from Team Orlin | Artist from Team Galena |
| Artist from Team Mariana | Artist from Team Grafa | Artist from Team Lubo |
| Artist from Team Preslava | Artist from Team Ivan | Artist from Team Maria |
| Artist from Team Yordan | Artist from Team Kamelia | Artist from Team Medi |
| Artist from Team Victoria | Artist from Team Poli |

Glasat na Bulgaria series overview
| Season | Aired | Winner | Runner-up | Third place | Fourth place | Fifth place | Sixth place | Winning coach | Presenters |
|---|---|---|---|---|---|---|---|---|---|
| 1 | 2011 | Steliyana Hristova | Igor Shabov | Antoaneta Linkova | Todor Gadzhalov | — | | Mariana Popova | Victoria Terziyska Marten Roberto (Live shows) |
| 2 | 2013 | Ivaylo Donkov | Krasimira Ivanova | Vasil Chergov | Todor Georgiev | — | | Miro | Marten Roberto Yana Marinova (Live shows) |
| 3 | 2014 | Kristina Ivanova | Ati Molova | Anna Pesheva | Nevena Tsoneva | — | | Desi Slava | Marten Roberto Victoria Terziyska (Live shows) |
| 4 | 2017 | Radko Petkov | Sarah Suzette | Yana Sabanova | Kristina Kabadjieva | — | | Ivan Lechev | Pavell & Venci Venc' |
| 5 | 2018 | Nia Petrova | Viktoria Dinkova | Rafael Pasamov | Olivia Nikolova | — | | Ivan Lechev | Pavell & Venci Venc' |
| 6 | 2019 | Atanas Kateliev | Kiril Hadzhiev-Tino | Iva Georgieva | Nadezhda Aleksandrova | — | | Grafa | Pavell & Venci Venc' |
| 7 | 2020 | Georgi Shopov | Joana Sashova | Kerana | Elena Sirakova | — | | Ivan Lechev | Pavell & Venci Venc' |
| 8 | 2021 | Petya Paneva | Georgi Kostadinov | Boris Hristov | Lidiya Ganeva | Raya Dimitrova | Ivan E. Ivanov | Galena | Ivan Tishev |
| 9 | 2022 | Jacklyn Tarrakci | Kaloyan Nikolov | Alexandar Petrov | Sonya Mihailova | Desislava Latinova | Victor Stambolov | Dara | Ivan Tishev |
| 10 | 2023 | Nadezhda Kovacheva | Dimitrina Germanova | Elena Popova | Nikola Yanakiev | Simeon Slavev | Arcangelo D'Angelo | Miro | Ivan Tishev |
| 11 | 2024 | Slaveya Ivanova | David Milanov | Yordan Petev | Anna Stavreva | Trio Fida | — | Dara | Vladimir Zombori; Boryana Bratoeva |
| 12 | 2026 | Current season | | | | | | | Vladimir Zombori; Boryana Bratoeva |

=== Coaches' results ===
Considering the final placement of the contestants who are members of their team (not the final placement of the coaches):

Coaches' results
| Coach | Winner | Runner-up | Third place | Fourth place | Fifth place | Sixth place | No finalists |
|---|---|---|---|---|---|---|---|
| Ivan Lechev | Thrice (4–5, 7) | —N/a | Twice (6, 8) | —N/a | Twice (8–9) | Once (8) | Twice (10–11) |
| Dara | Twice (9, 11) | —N/a | Once (11) | Twice (8, 10) | —N/a | Once (10) | —N/a |
| Miro | Twice (2, 10) | —N/a | Once (10) | Twice (1, 3) | —N/a | —N/a | —N/a |
| Grafa | Once (6) | Once (7) | Twice (4–5) | Once (11) | Once (11) | —N/a | —N/a |
| Galena | Once (8) | Once (8) | Once (9) | Once (9) | —N/a | —N/a | —N/a |
| Mariana Popova | Once (1) | —N/a | —N/a | —N/a | —N/a | —N/a | —N/a |
| Desi Slava | Once (3) | —N/a | —N/a | —N/a | —N/a | —N/a | —N/a |
| Maria Ilieva | —N/a | Twice (10–11) | —N/a | —N/a | Once (10) | —N/a | —N/a |
| Poli Genova | —N/a | Twice (4–5) | —N/a | —N/a | —N/a | —N/a | —N/a |
| Kamelia | —N/a | Once (6) | Once (7) | Twice (4–5) | —N/a | —N/a | —N/a |
| Lubo Kirov | —N/a | Once (9) | —N/a | —N/a | —N/a | Once (9) | Once (8) |
| Kiril Marichkov | —N/a | Once (1) | —N/a | —N/a | —N/a | —N/a | —N/a |
| Yordan Karadjov | —N/a | Once (2) | —N/a | —N/a | —N/a | —N/a | —N/a |
| Atanas Penev | —N/a | Once (3) | —N/a | —N/a | —N/a | —N/a | —N/a |
| Ivana | —N/a | —N/a | Once (1) | —N/a | —N/a | —N/a | —N/a |
| Victoria Terziyska | —N/a | —N/a | Once (2) | —N/a | —N/a | —N/a | —N/a |
| Orlin Goranov | —N/a | —N/a | Once (3) | —N/a | —N/a | —N/a | —N/a |
| Mihaela Fileva | —N/a | —N/a | —N/a | Twice (6–7) | —N/a | —N/a | —N/a |
| Preslava | —N/a | —N/a | —N/a | Once (2) | —N/a | —N/a | —N/a |
| Medi | —N/a | —N/a | —N/a | —N/a | —N/a | —N/a | —N/a |

== See also ==
- The Voice (franchise)
