= Kavarna Rock Fest =

Former Bulgarian rock festival

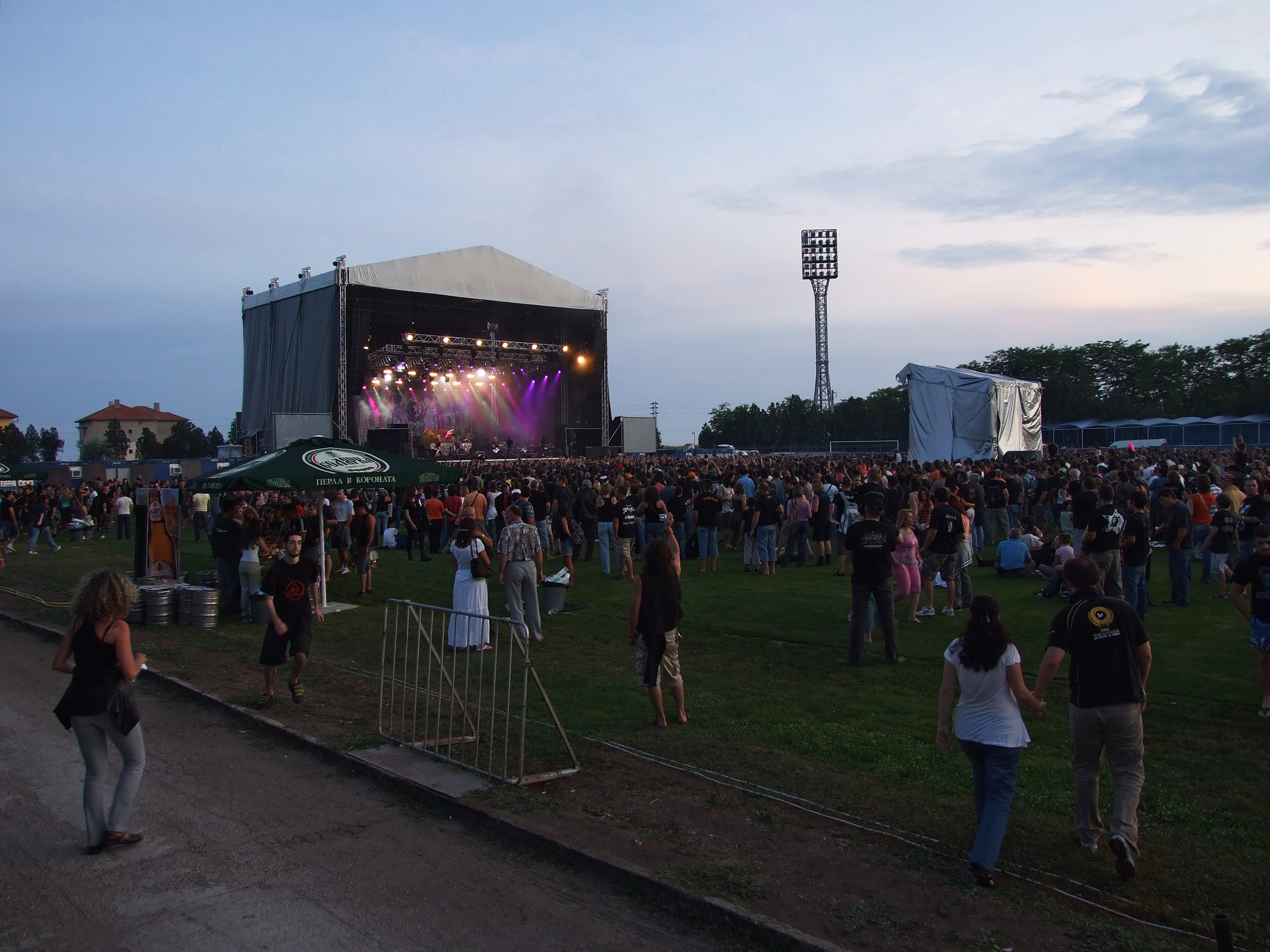
- Genre: Heavy metal, rock
- Dates: June or July
- Locations: Kavarna, Bulgaria
- Years active: 2006–2016

Kavarna Rock Fest was a Bulgarian rock festival that took place every year at the Kavarna Stadium in Kavarna. Until 2010 the festival's name was Kaliakra Rock Fest.

== 2006 ==
The first edition of the festival was on 25 August 2006. The festival was in one day and featured:

Testament,
Helloween and
Twisted Sister.

== 2007 ==
The next edition was in 2007. This edition of the fest continued for three days and featured:

28 June — Heaven and Hell
29 June — Motörhead
30 June — Manowar

The concert of Manowar was filmed for an official DVD released by the band. Furthermore, it was marked by the band singing the Bulgarian national anthem in Bulgarian, much to the delight of the audience.

== 2008 ==
The third edition took place in 2008 and featured:

5 July — Holy Hell and Manowar
6 July — Sixth Sense and Alice Cooper
7 July — Slayer and In Flames

The official calendar of municipality Kavarna was with photos of Manowar. Manowar made their record-long concert on that day featuring 5 hours.

== 2009 ==
The fourth edition of the festival took place in 2009 and the headliners (support) were:

1 July - Mötley Crüe (Lauren Harris)
2 July - Scorpions (Edguy, Blind Guardian)
3 July - Dream Theater, Cynic

== 2010 ==
In 2010 the festival's name was changed to Kavarna Rock Fest. The festival is organised by The municipality of Kavarna and Loud Concerts and here's the lineup:

23 July - Tarja, Doro, Epica, Leaves' Eyes, Atrocity

24 July - Destruction, Sodom, Kreator, Korpiklaani

25 July - Accept, Primal Fear, Annihilator, Voivod

The official festival radio of Kavarna Rock Fest 2010 was radio Tangra.

== 2011 ==
The sixth edition of the festival took place in 2011 and featured:

15 July - Paradise Lost, Sonata Arctica, Katatonia, Dreamshade
16 July - Opeth, Moonspell, Tiamat, Sylosis
17 July - Arch Enemy, Lake of Tears, Suicidal Angels

== 2012 ==
The seventh edition of the festival took place in 2012 and featured:

13 July - Dio Disciples, Glenn Hughes, Michael Schenker Group, B.T.R.
14 July - Stryper, Dokken, Big Noize (feat Sebastian Bach), D2&Dicho
15 July - Lizzy Borden, Kamelot, Rhapsody of Fire, Ahat, Renagat

== 2013 ==
The eighth edition of the festival took place in June 2013 and featured:

1 June - Accept, Thunder, Aria, Cherno Feredzhe
2 June - Deep Purple, Doro Pesch, Alisa, Analgin

== 2014 ==
The ninth edition of the festival took place in June 2014 and featured:

27 June - Signal, Black Sea Battle Of The Bands
28 June - Europe, Krokus, Pretty Maids, Uli Jon Roth
29 June - Helloween, Sabaton, Gotthard, Jorn

== 2015 ==
The tenth edition of the festival took place in June 2015 and featured:

26 June - Jägermeister Battle of the Bands
27 June - Within Temptation, Unisonic, Kamelot, Delain, A winner band from Jägermeister Battle of the Bands
28 June - Twisted Sister, HammerFall, UFO, Candlemass, A winner from Jägermeister Battle of the Bands

== 2016 ==
The eleventh edition of the festival took place in July 2016 and featured:

2 July - Axel Rudi Pell, Therion, Varg, Odd Crew, E-an-na
3 July - Avantasia, Soilwork, Myrath, Last Hope (band), Thiarra
