= Maria Ilieva =

Bulgarian singer, songwriter and a producer (born 1977)

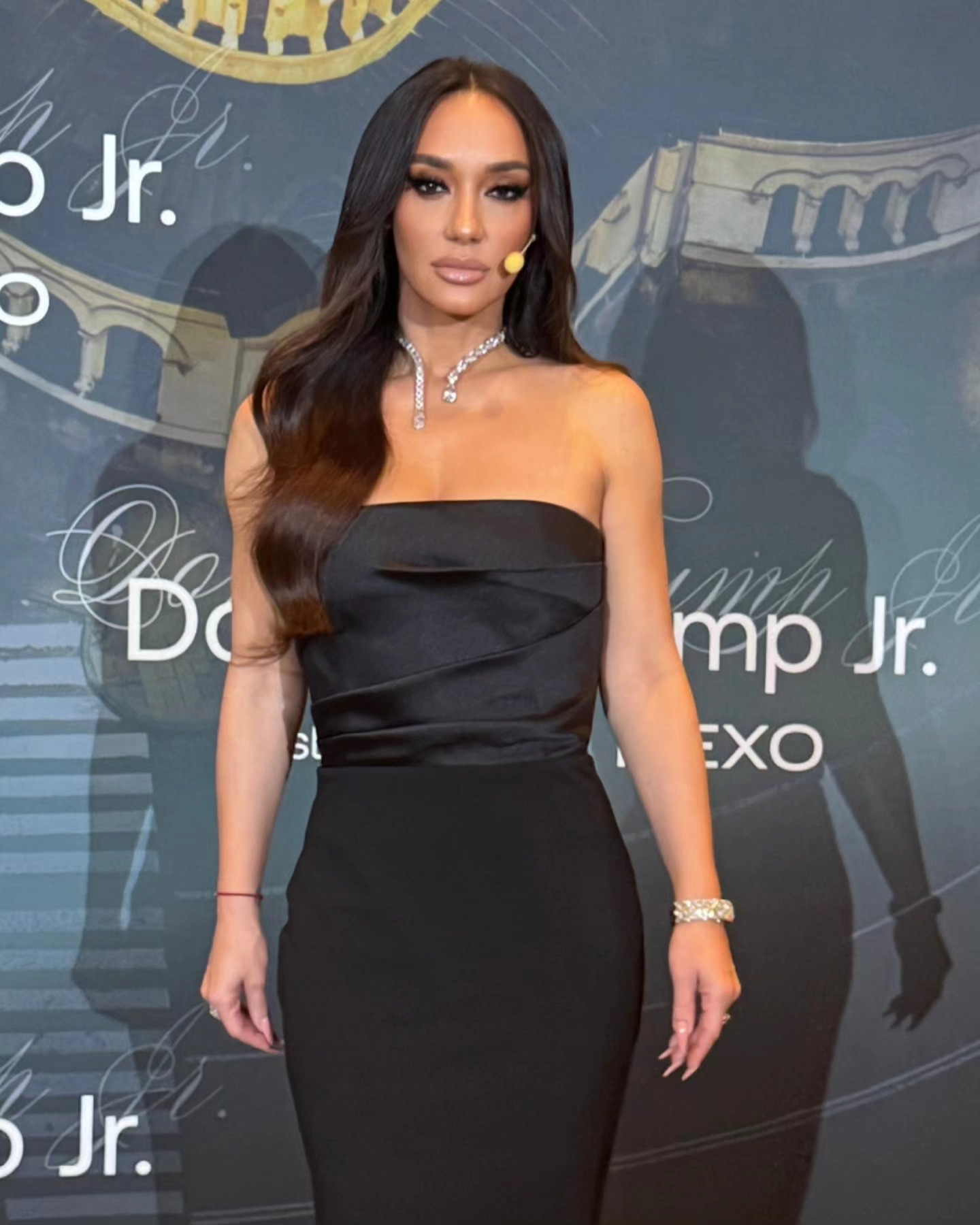
- Ilieva in June 2024

Background information
- Born: Maria Ilieva (Мария Илиева); 1 December 1977 (age 48); Veliko Tarnovo, Bulgaria
- Genres: Pop; Soul; R&B; Adult Contemporary
- Occupations: Singer; producer; songwriter
- Labels: MI Productions; Stereo Room

Maria Ilieva (Bulgarian: Мария Илиева, born 1 December 1977) is a Bulgarian singer, songwriter and producer. She is recognized as one of the most successful female vocal artists of the contemporary Bulgarian music scene. In the last over 20 years of active solo career, she has released over 30 hit singles, two award-winning studio albums, a maxi single and a greatest hits album. She has received over 40 awards for music and style.

Alongside her music career, Ilieva has been a judge on the first, second and third seasons of X Factor Bulgaria, The Masked Singer Bulgaria season 1, and The Voice of Bulgaria seasons 10–12. In 2019 she finished second in the 8th season of the Bulgarian version of Your Face Sounds Familiar. She has appeared in a number of Bulgarian and international films and TV series.

Maria has taken part in a vast number of social and philanthropy activities supporting regional and national causes.

== Early life ==
Maria Ilieva was born in Veliko Tarnovo, Bulgaria, in a family of musicians. Her mother, Vanya Moneva, is the choir-master of the Vanya Moneva female choir and her late father, Krasimir Iliev, was the conductor of Sofia Wind Orchestra. Trained pianist since the age of five, she developed her vocal skills as a member of the “Petko Stainov” Choir Academy.

Ilieva graduated from the Sofia High School of Mathematics. She proceeded to receive a master's degree in Insurance and a master's degree in International Relations. Her career as a performing vocal artist started in the late 1990 as the lead vocalist of the bands Visoko and Kaffe Band – the latter best known abroad for representing Bulgaria at the 2005 Eurovision Song Contest.

== Music career ==
=== Moon Dream (2001 single & album) ===
The launch of Maria Ilieva's solo career is marked by the release of her first single "Moon Dream" in the summer of 2001. The album (also titled Moon Dream) was duly released later on in the year, having been described by a Bulgarian website as a phenomenon in BG pop music. Singles released from the album ("Moon Dream", "Nothing") have gone straight to No.1 in all leading Bulgarian radio and television pop charts, while "Alright" (produced in collaboration with the avant-garde soul-funk band TE), shot to fame by staying on the top of Bulgarian Top 100 chart for an unprecedented 13 successive weeks.

=== Stereo Room (2002 maxi single) ===
Ilieva's next project, Stereo Room, included remixes by Bulgarian DJs. The single "Stereo room" was the first completely animated Bulgarian music video produced.

=== I Come To You (2007 album) ===
After establishing her own record label "MI Productions" in 2003, Maria Ilieva worked in collaboration with Bulgarian and American musicians, songwriters and producers to record her album I Come To You, including the singles:

- "What Does It Take" – first single released in English /video produced in Los Angeles, USA/, went straight to No.1 as a new entry on MM TV's TOP 20;
- "Idvash kam men" (You come to me) – Ilieva's first ballad single;
- "Kradena Lubov" (Born for love) – duet single with Bulgarian male vocalist/composer Graffa, whose video went to No.6 on MTV Europe's World Chart Express;
- "Off the Record" – Ilieva's first collaboration with a hip-hop artist – Knas /Knas&Bacardi/ – 3 weeks at No.1 – Out of 5 chart of Bulgarian national television;
- "Minalo" (Past) – a single that has gone to No.1 on "BG Radio's TOP 20" chart and stayed there for 5 weeks;
- "On My Own" – a single dedicated to the fight against human trafficking and forced prostitution. Official world premiere – 24 March 2007, at The stars of Europe concert, dedicated to the 50th anniversary of EU, broadcast on 56 national TV stations worldwide;
- "Dumi" (Words) – went straight to No.1 on MM TV's TOP 20 three weeks after its release. Premiered on MTV Europe on 24.11.07.

=== "Truly" (2009 single) ===
"Truly", the pilot single from Maria's upcoming album, is a vocal house duet song with the American DJ/songwriter/producer Keith Thompson, best known for his remarkable collaboration "Break 4 Love" with David Vendetta. The Bassmonkeys’ remix of "Truly" topped BG Radio's weekly Top 20 chart and remained at No1 for six consecutive weeks, a precedent in the chart's history, and won the Best Duet Award at the ceremony in 2010. "Truly" also won the Best SEE Pop Song at the SEEME Awards in 2010. A phenomenal success for the single was its reaching the top position at the number 1 Australian dance radio station ZFM's chart. It was also rotated on the most popular online Argentinean radio station SonicFM.

=== "I Like" (2010 single) ===
"I Like", Maria's following hit single, reached the No. 1 positions in all the national music charts. It stayed at No. 1 at Eurochannel's Prime Time Top 10 chart for three consecutive months.

=== O Primeiro Grande Amor – a duet with Tony Carreira ===
In 2012 at the Top of the Top festival in Poland Maria Ilieva met Tony Carreira, a multi platinum Portuguese singer-songwriter who later invited her to record a duet for his upcoming album "Essencial" orchestrated by the London Symphonic Orchestra. "O Primeiro Grande Amor" (The first big love) is recorded in studio Guillaume Tell in Paris, and the album became four times platinum within three months of its release.

=== 2013 singles – "Wanna Be The Best", "Igraya stilno", "Uslovie #1" ===
In 2013 Maria released three singles, two in collaboration and one solo. "Wanna Be The Best" by KNAS and the Swedish hip-hop artist Bacardy featuring Maria Ilieva took over the clubs in Bulgaria and quickly turns into a summer hit. "Igraya stilno", Maria's long anticipated solo single carries the singer's unique vibe and style. A remix by the Bulgarian musician/composer Dexter turned into a massive club hit. Maria's next project, the reggae hit "Uslovie #1" (Rule #1) took Maria's fans to a whole new experience. The song is a duet with Zafayah, part of the best Eastern European reggae band Roots Rocket.

=== "Vidimo dovolni" – a duet with Krisko ===
In 2014 Maria records a duet with the hip-hop artist / beatmaker in the country – Krisko. Their song "Vidimo dovolni" was the most rotated song for 2014 and one of the biggest Bulgarian internet hit of all times back in the days with over 35 million views on YouTube (as of July 2022).

=== "Neka Vali" (2016 single) ===
One of Maria's most distinguished ballads cowritten by her.

=== "Vsichko" and "Ne si gotov (Vsichko p. 2)" (2018 singles) ===
Both songs cowritten by Maria, and the latter features the hottest Bulgarian trap musicians V:RGO & TRF.

=== "Vsichko - nay-dobroto ot Maria Ilieva" (2018 Greatest hits album) ===
Maria's first Greatest hits album features 16 original tracks and four remixes, including 11 unreleased hit singles. It is referred to as the "music gem".

=== "Fuego" and "Contigo" / "Tvoya" (2019 & 2020 singles) ===
Maria's music style got a twist into the dancehall / Latin genres with the two songs she released in Spanish one of which got a Bulgarian language version as well. Both were written by the Romanian producers Global Records.

=== "Ostani Tazi Nosht" (2021 single) ===
Maria starred in and performed the OST of a Bulgarian TV show Portalat (The Portal, 2021 Miramar Films / BNT). "Ostani Tazi Nosht" is written by renowned Bulgarian authors Rafi Zhamakortsyan and Damyan Damyanov.

=== "Lubov" (2022 single) ===
The first song entirely written by Maria Ilieva herself. The power ballad is often considered a peak in Maria's career so far.

=== "Ako Utre Nyama Dnes" - duet with Miro ===
Maria Ilieva and Miro's duet from 2023 "Ako Utre Nyama Dnes" is regarderas a long-awaited event for the Bulgarian music industry.

=== "100 Prichini" (2024 single) ===
A disco-funk tune co-written by Maria Ilieva, Preyah and Martin Kleveland.

== Stereo Room – the record label ==
In 2007 Maria Ilieva founded her new label to promote young Bulgarian talent called "Stereo Room". This record label aims at producing and promoting young talented singers from Bulgaria. Special auditions took place in the beginning of 2008 and the first artist – Krista – was selected. Her debut single, "Tova, koeto iskash", went straight to No. 1 at all the national music charts and reached No. 2 on MTV Europe's World Chart Express. The second artist produced by Stereo Room is B.O.Y.A.N. and his first single's ("It's Over") video premiere is on MAD TV on 9 February 2009. Other of the label's signed artists include "Imam", "Za teb", "Silna lyubov" (feat. Spens) and "Incomplete" – Krista; "Pop Trash", "Teen Life" – MONA; "Komplimenti" – KNAS feat. B.O.Y.A.N.

== Discography ==
Moon Dream / Лунен сън

- Released: 2001
- Label: BMK / БМК
- Tracks: "Haos ot mechti", "Shokolad", "Ne tarsya", "Pa-ra-ra", "Men i teb", "I oshte neshto...", "Lunen san club mix", "Ni6to (club mix re-edit Nishto)"
- Singles: "Moon Dream", "Nothing", "Alright" with TE, "Me and You",

Stereo Room / Стерео стая

- Released: 2002
- Label: BMK / БМК

Idvam kam teb / Идвам към теб

- Released: 2006
- Label: MI Productions
- Tracks: "The Shit", "All That", "Stop", "Il Destino Con Te" (feat. Leo), "Malko vreme", "Stoy tam", "Minalo" (Vibeats club remix)
- Singles: "What Does It Take", "Born For Love" (duet with Graffa), "Off The Record" feat. Knas, "You Come To Me", " Idvash kam men", "On My Own", "Minalo", "Dumi" (feat. YaYa)

Chuvas li me (a duet with Graffa)

- Released: 2008
- Label: Monte Music

Truly

- Released: 2009
- Label: MI Productions / Thompsonic Recordings

I Like

- Released: 2010
- Label: Stereo Room

S teb nauchih kak (a duet with D2)

- Released: 2012
- Label: Musicautor, ProCinema, Stereo Room, Monte Music, TzvetanTzanov.com

O Primeiro Grande Amor

- Released: 2012

Wanna Be The Best – KNAS & Bacardy feat. Maria Ilieva

- Released: 2013
- Label: Stereo Room

Igraya stilno

- Released: 2010
- Label: Stereo Room

Uslovie No. 1

- Released: 2013
- Label: Stereo Room

Vidimo dovolni (a duet with Krisko)

- Released: 2014
- Label: Krisko Beats / Stereo Room

Taka da e (a duet with Atanas Kolev)

- Released: 2015
- Label: Stereo Room

Neka vali

- Released: 2016
- Label: Stereo Room

Cheren Spisak (a duet with Billy Hlapeto)

- Released: 2016
- Label: Monte Music / Stereo Room

Mi Amor

- Released: 2017
- Label: Stereo Room

Vsichko

- Released: 2018
- Label: Stereo Room

Ne Si Gotov (Vsichko p.2)

- Released: 2018
- Label: Stereo Room

Vsichko - Nay-dobroto ot Maria Ilieva

- Released: 2018
- Label: Stereo Room
- Tracks: Lunen sun, Nishto, Alright (with TE band), Stereo Room, Igraya Stilno, Sama, I Like, Minalo, Mi Amor, Kradena Lubov (a duet with Grafa), Chuvash li me (a duet with Grafa), Neka Vali, Truly (a duet with Keith Thompson), Wanna Be The Best (with KNAS & Bacardi), Vidimo Dovolni (with Krisko), Vsichko
- Bonus tracks: Neka Vali (DiMO (BG) Remix), Igraya Stilno (Remix by Dexter), Mi Amor (DJ Doncho Remix), Ne Si Gotov (Vsichko p.2) (with V:RGO & TRF)

Fuego

- Released: 2019
- Label: Stereo Room

Contigo

- Released: 2020
- Label: Stereo Room

Tvoya

- Released: 2020
- Label: Stereo Room

Ostani Tazi Nosht

- Released: 2021
- Label: Stereo Room / BNT

Lubov

- Released: 2022
- Label: Stereo Room

Ako Utre Nyama Dnes (a duet with Miro)

- Released: 2023
- Label: Stereo Room / EMMA Music

100 Prichini

- Released: 2024
- Label: Stereo Room

Forever (with Joe Lynn Turner)

- Released: 2024
- Label: JOLT Productions / Stereo Room

Izberi Sebe Si

- Released: 2025
- Label: Stereo Room

SuperJena

- Released: 2025
- Label: Stereo Room

== Concerts ==
Maria has performed alongside Glenn Hughes (Deep Purple), Simply Red, the Scorpions, Lou Bega, Zucchero, Gipsy Kings, James Arthur, Tony Carreira and others, and has been opening for artists such as George Michael, Simple Minds, Dannii Minogue, Atomic Kitten, Garaj Mahal.

Maria is a headliner at some of the most prestigious music festivals in South-East Europe, such as Apolonia, Bansko Jazz Fest, Music Jam, etc. and has had a number of concert and gig tours across Bulgaria, Austria, Germany, Belgium, Serbia, Romania, Macedonia, UK, USA.

In 2007 she was invited to represent Bulgaria as the only Eastern European artist in the Stars of Europe concert commemorating the 50th anniversary of the European Union in Brussels. The event was broadcast to nearly half a billion viewers all over the world.

Since 2008 Maria has toured the country with symphonic orchestras. This unique collaboration was perceived extremely well among the audience and media.

In 2011 Maria commemorated 10 years since the beginning of her solo career with a national tour. The final concert in Sofia took place on the largest scene ever built in Bulgaria for a Bulgarian music artist and was labelled a performance of highest class.

In August 2012 she was invited to represent Bulgaria at the Top of The Top Festival in Sopot, Poland, which brought together the biggest stars of 16 European countries.

In 2013 Maria is a special guest of Tony Carreira's world tour during his three concerts in the legendary Olympia hall in Paris and two concerts in MEO Arena in Lisbon, Portugal.

In March 2015 Maria performed at the most technologically advanced hall on the Balkans – Sofia Event Center. The concert was highly praised by fans and critics.

A national tour "Vsichko - nay-dobroto ot Maria Ilieva" supporting the Greatest hits album took place in 2019 and visited the summer theaters in Plovdiv, Burgas & Varna, and finished in Hall 1 of the National Palace of Culture in Sofia.

In 2023 Maria Ilieva performed in 14 Bulgarian cities with her LOVE Tour. The final concert was in Hall 1 of the National Palace of Culture in Sofia.

The 2024 "100 Prichini" tour visited the Summer theatres of 5 Bulgarian cities - Stara Zagora, Varna, Plovdiv, Ruse and Pleven.

== Awards ==
Maria Ilieva has been awarded the Woman of the Year award by GRAZIA magazine Bulgaria in 2006, 2009, 2011, 2013, and 2018, and has been ranked as the most influential female celebrity by FORBES magazine Bulgaria for 2013, 2014 and 2015.

Her music and style awards include:

=== 2001–2002 ===
- Best Debut – Melo TV Mania, Bulgarian National Television
- Best Debut – MM TV Awards
- Best Video (Moon Dream) – BG Radio Music Awards
- Best Video (Moon Dream) – Forte Top 100 Awards, Bulgarian National Television
- Best Female Artist – BG Radio Music Awards
- Best Female Artist – Forte Top 100, Bulgarian National Television

=== 2002–2003 ===
- Best Female Artist – BG Radio Music Awards
- Best Female Artist – MM TV Awards
- Best Female Artist – Rhythm Magazine Awards
- Best Video Award (Nishto) – Rhythm Magazine Awards

=== 2004 ===
- Best Female Artist – Melo TV Mania, BNT
- Best website of the year – International Media Festival Albena
- Best Hairstyle – Pantene Beauty Awards

=== 2005 ===
- Best Female Artist Award – BG Radio Music Awards
- Best Style Award – Bravo FM Group

=== 2006 ===
- Best Female Artist – BG Radio Music Awards
- Woman of the Year – Grazia Magazine/Avon Awards

=== 2007 ===
- Best Album ("I Come To You"/M.I.Productions) – MM TV Awards
- Most Stylish Singer as announced by Elle Magazine
- Golden Pen Award – for a Special Contribution to Bulgarian Culture – Classic FM Radio/MAKTA

=== 2008 ===
- Best Female Artist – MM TV Music Awards
- Most Stylish Woman Award – Bravo FM Group

=== 2009 ===
- Woman Of The Year - GRAZIA magazine
- Best collaboration (Chuvash li me with Grafa) - FAN TV Music Awards

=== 2010 ===
- Best South-Eastern Song (Truly with Keith Thompson) - SEEME Music Awards
- Best Duet (with Keith Thompson) - BG Radio Awards

=== 2011 ===
- BG Fashion Idol - Fashion Lifestyle Magazine
- Woman of the Year - Grazia Magazine Awards

=== 2012 ===
- Golden Book Award - for special contrubition towards the development of the Bulgarian culture
- IKAR - Union of the Bulgarian Artists

=== 2013 ===
- Most Stylish Woman – Grazia Magazine Awards

=== 2014 ===
- Best Lyrics (Igraya Stilno) - BG Radio Music Awards

=== 2015 ===
- Best song – "Vidimo dovolni" (with Krisko) – BG Radio Music Awards
- Best song – “Vidimo dovolni” (with Krisko) – 359 Hip-Hop Awards
- Best collaboration – “Vidimo dovolni” (with Krisko) – 359 Hip-Hop Awards
- Most rotated song on The Voice TV channel – “Vidimo dovolni” (with Krisko) – a special award from The Voice TV, 359 Hip-Hop Awards
- Most liked, commented and shared video on Vbox7 – “Vidimo dovolni” (with Krisko) – a special award from Vbox7, 359 Hip-Hop Awards

=== 2016 ===
- Best collaboration – "Taka da e" (with Atanas Kolev) – 359 Hip-Hop Awards

=== 2018 ===
- Woman of the Year - Grazia Magazine Awards

=== 2019 ===
- Best Female Artist - BG Radio Music Awards
- Woman of the Decade - Woman.bg

=== 2022 ===
- Best Female Artist - BG Radio Music Awards

=== 2023 ===
- Lifetime achievement award - the RnB Awards

=== 2024 ===
- Best Collaboration - "Ako Utre Nyama Dnes" with Miro - BG Radio Music Awards
- Women of the Year - Glamour Magazine

=== 2025 ===
- Best Duet (Forever with Joe Lynn Turner) - BNR Top 20

== Filmography ==
Film and television appearances
| Year | Title | Role | Producer |
|---|---|---|---|
| 2002 | Emigrants | Model (unnamed) | Boyana Cinema |
| 2005 | The Mechanik aka The Russian Specialist | Natalya | Millennium Films / Nu Image |
| 2005 | Submerged | Sandrow's Woman | Millennium Films / Nu Image |
| 2006 | Undisputed 2 | Reporter | Millennium Films / Nu Image |
| 2012 | Sutreshen Blok | Maria Ilieva | Old School Productions |
| 2011, 2012, 2014 | X factor (Bulgaria) | Herself / Judge | Global Films |
| 2015 | Sofia Residents in Excess (Bulgarian: Столичани в повече) | Maria Scala | Dream Team |
| 2015 | Inside Out | Joy (Voice) | Disney / Pixar |
| 2018 | Sinners (Bulgarian: Грешници) | Ani | 100 Films / bTV Studios |
| 2019 | Your Face Sounds Familiar / Като 2 капки вода | Herself / Anastacia / Sofi Marinova / Keala Settle / Mariah Carey / Madonna / Veselin Marinov / Steven Tyler (Aerosmith) / Luciano Pavarotti / Keith Flint (The Prodigy) / Verka Siderova / Emil Dimitrov / KariZma / Beyonce | Global Film |
| 2019 | The Masked Singer (Маскираният певец) | Herself / Panelist | Global Films |
| 2021 | Portalat | Yordanka Hristova / Zhana Yaneva (singing voice) | Miramar Films / BNT |
| 2023, 2024 | The Voice of Bulgaria | Herself / Coach | ITV Studios / bTV |
| 2024 | Inside Out 2 | Joy (Voice) | Disney / Pixar |

== Social engagements ==
Apart from her music career, Maria Ilieva has been dedicated to a number of important social engagements and causes, such as:

- 2018 – present – Official Spokesperson and Goodwill Ambassador for UNICEF's campaign “For every child, #EarlyMomentsMatter”
- 2018 – Goodwill ambassador for JAMBA's campaign “Equality means more” aiming to integrate the persons with disabilities into the society
- 2018 – present – Official Spokesperson for the National Cause Movement's campaign “Do it for Bulgaria” aiming at increasing the country's birth-rate
- 2012 – present – Official Spokesperson for Teach For Bulgaria foundation facilitating equal access to education for every Bulgarian child
- 2009 – present – Member of the Managing Board of the Bulgarian Organization for collective management of neighbouring music rights PROPHON
- 2008 – present – Spokesperson for ICanToo foundation's campaign to help us raising funds for the needs of children with disabilities
- 2007 – Ambassador of the European Year of Equal Opportunities for All
- 2006 – 2007 – Official Spokesperson for Face to Face Foundation's Campaign Against Human Trafficking and Forced Prostitution
- 2006 – Official Spokesperson for Standard daily newspaper Fund-raiser Initiative for Talented Children
- 2005 – present – Official Spokesperson for the Avon Cosmetics’ Campaign Against Breast Cancer, a part of the global initiative for breast cancer awareness and prevention

== Brand ambassador / spokesperson ==
- 2024 - Official ambassador for VISA Bulgaria' She's Next campaign
- 2024 - Official Home2u celebrity spokesperson
- 2023 - Influencer campaign for Johnnie Walker Bulgaria's Footseps for Progress campaign
- 2023 - Brand Ambassador and celebrity spokesperson for VIVACOM
- 2023 - Official Belène® Anti-Age Beauty Secret Brand Ambassador and celebrity spokesperson
- 2022 - Influencer campaign for Kaufland Bulgaria
- 2021 - Influencer campaign for Find Me Wines
- 2020 - Influencer campaigns for Lavazza, Nestle Purina ProPlan, Pampers
- 2019 - Influencer campaigns for Captain Cook & Nestlé's Maggi
- 2016–present - Brand ambassador for British American Tobacco Bulgaria
- 2015 - Official Samsung Galaxy Brand Ambassador and celebrity spokesperson
- 2013 – 2014 – Official Mtel Brand Ambassador and celebrity spokesperson
- 2013 – Official Avon Sensuelle Brand Ambassador and celebrity spokesperson
- 2009 – 2010 – Official KitKat Senses Brand Ambassador and celebrity spokesperson
- 2008 – 2009 – Official Société Générale Expressbank Brand Ambassador and celebrity spokesperson
- 2006 – 2007 – Official spokesperson for BMW
- 2005 – 2007 – Official celebrity spokesperson for Haute Couture designer NEVENA
- 2003 – 2005 – Official Pantene Pro-V Brand Ambassador and celebrity Spokesperson
