= Medi (singer) =

Syrian singer-songwriter

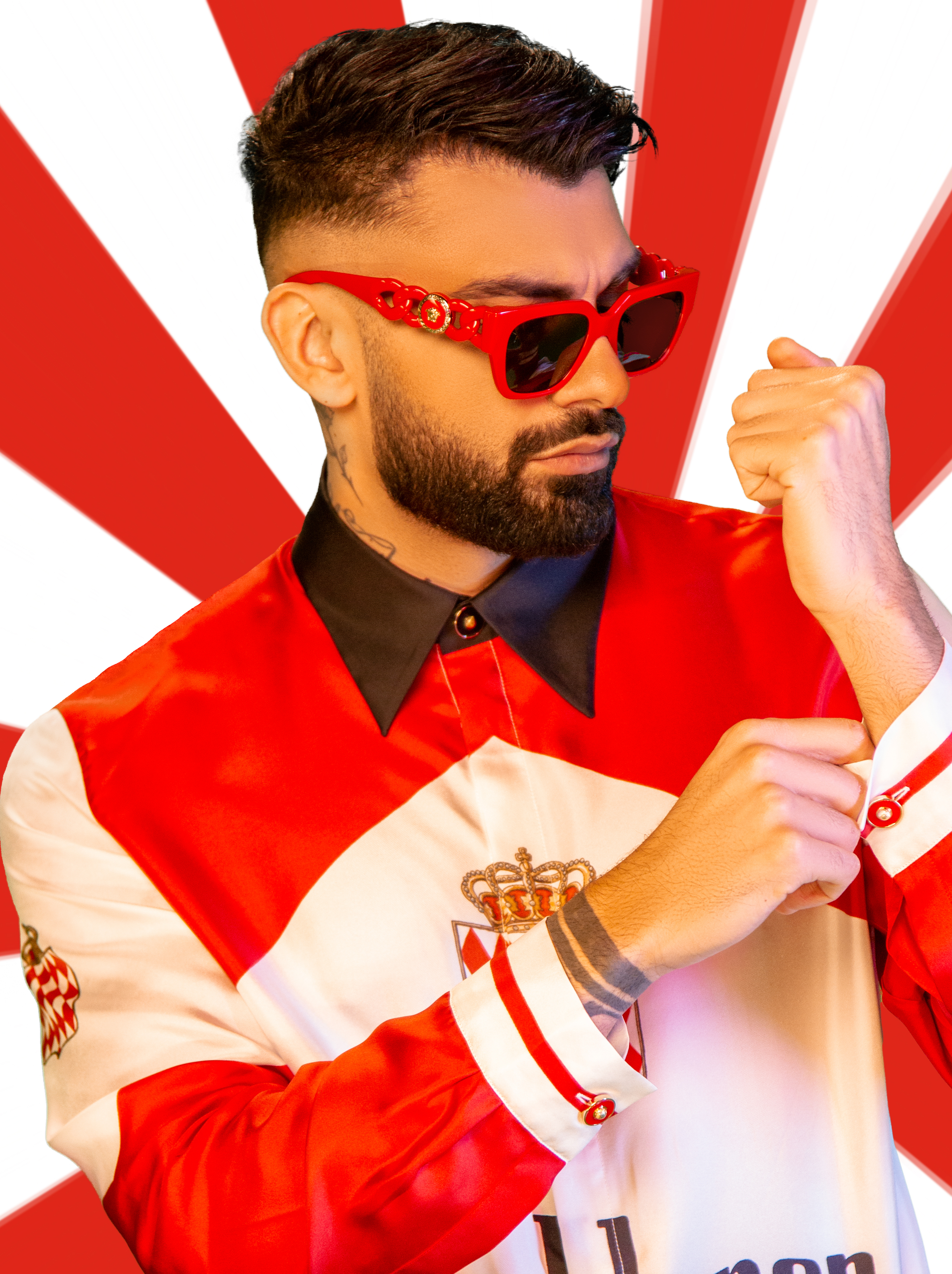
- Medi in 2022

Background information
- Born: Mehmed Ognyanov Gogov; 16 June 1994 (age 32)
- Origin: Sandanski, Bulgaria
- Genres: Pop Folk; Pop; Dance Pop
- Occupations: Singer, producer
- Instruments: Vocals; guitar
- Years active: 2013–present

Mehmed Ognyanov Gogov (Bulgarian: Мехмед Огнянов Гогов; born 16 June 1994), professionally known as Medi (Меди), is a Bulgarian pop-folk singer, musician, and producer. He is predominantly known for his blend of contemporary pop, trap, and traditional chalga elements. He is one of the leading figures in Bulgarian mainstream pop-folk music.

== Early life and education ==
Mehmed Gogov was born on 16 June 1994 in Sandanski, Bulgaria. He began playing musical instruments at a young age and learned to play both the acoustic guitar and the tambura. He pursued a musical education at the National School of Folklore Arts "Shiroka Laka" and graduated with a specialization in traditional Bulgarian folklore and instrumentation.

== Career ==
=== 2013–2018: Career beginnings ===
Gogov first gained public exposure by participating in various television music reality formats in Bulgaria starting in 2013.

Gogov began performing under his stage name "Medi" in 2018 with the release of his first professional singles, including "Huliganka" (Хулиганка) and "Proverka" (Проверка).

=== 2019–present: Mainstream success and Glasat na Bulgaria coach ===
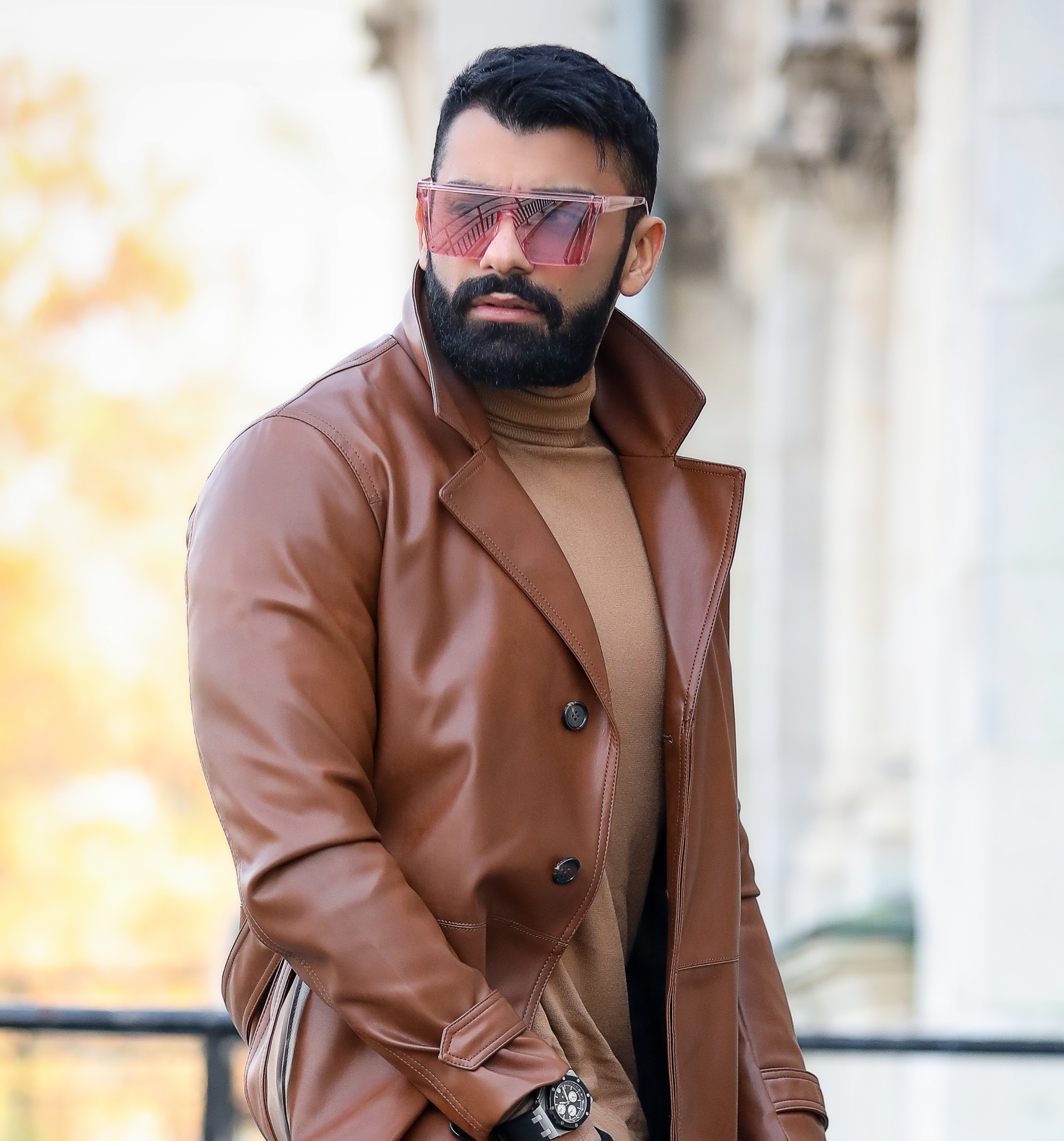
Medi in an outdoor setting

Between 2019 and 2021, Medi experienced a notable surge in popularity, transitioning from a rising talent to a pop-folk star. His breakout success was driven by a string of viral hits characterized by emotional, melancholic lyrics and highly produced music videos.

In 2021, his performance of "Da si tuk" (Да си тук) earned immense critical and commercial acclaim, solidifying his position atop the Bulgarian streaming charts on platforms like Spotify and YouTube. Other major hits from this time period include "Rana" (Рана), "Paranoya" (Параноя), "Zhivei, milo moe" (Живей, мило мое), and "Film za nas" (Филм за нас). Medi later established his own independent music label, Mega Star, through which he releases his own music and produces projects for other emerging artists in the Bulgarian music industry.

In September 2026, Medi debuted as a coach on the twelfth season of Glasat na Bulgaria.

== Artistry ==
Medi's music has been recognised for bridging the gap between traditional Balkan pop-folk (chalga) and modern Western mainstream pop and trap music. Lyrically, his songs heavily explore themes of passionate romance, heartbreak, and personal introspection.

== Discography ==
=== Singles ===
- "Huliganka" (Хулиганка) (2018)
- "Proverka" (Проверка) (2018)
- "Da si tuk" (Да си тук) (2021)
- "Rana" (Рана) (2021)
- "Paranoya" (Параноя) (2022)
- "Zhivei, milo moe" (Живей, мило мое) (2023)
- "Dum Tak" (Дум Так) (2024)
