= Mastilo =

Bulgarian pop rock band

- Origin: Sofia, Bulgaria
- Genres: Rock; pop
- Years active: 1999–present
- Members: Victoria Terziyska; Desislav Danchev; Vladislav Hristov; Kirill Dikov

Mastilo (Bulgarian: Мастило) is a Bulgarian pop rock band from Sofia, formed in 1999. It consists of vocalist Victoria Terziyska, guitarist Desislav Danchev, drummer Vladislav Hristov, and bassist Kirill Dikov. As of 2025, they have released three studio albums and one compilation.

== History ==
Mastilo was formed in 1999 in Sofia. The band consists of Viktoriya "Wiki" Terziyska (Виктория Терзийска), who previously sang with the group Sprint (Спринт) and was also the host of the music program Forte (Форте) on Bulgarian National Television; guitarist Desislav Danchev (Десислав Данчев); drummer Vladislav Khristov (Владислав Христов); and bassist Kirill "Kiredingo" Dikov (Кирил "Кирединго" Диков).

The band released their debut studio album, Iгуана, in 2001, and Репетиция followed in 2003. In 2005, they performed at the Golden Stag Festival in Romania, sharing the stage with Joe Cocker and Natalie Imbruglia, among others.

In January 2006, Mastilo issued their next studio album, titled Ела до мен. They used the single "Next to You" to qualify for the national eliminations for the 51st Eurovision Song Contest. At the end of February, they performed in the semi-final of the selection and advanced to the final, held two weeks later, where they ultimately took second place after winning 4,000 votes from television viewers (20.47% support), losing to Mariana Popova. The same year, Mastilo performed in China as well as at the Kaliakra Rock Fest in Bulgaria, where they supported Russian pop singer Philipp Kirkorov.

In 2007, Mastilo performed in Eilat, Israel, and at the Lovech Rock Festival in Bulgaria. The same year, they again entered the national Eurovision selection, this time with the song "Gettin' Crazy". In early February, they performed in the semi-finals of the selection and advanced to the final, organized three weeks later. They took eighth place out of twelve artists.

In 2010, they released the single "W rycete ti e naj-dobre", the music video for which gained over 400 thousand views on YouTube. In early 2011, their next single came out, titled "Do kraja". Both songs promoted the release of the band's first compilation album, В ръцете ти е най-добре, which came out in February 2012.

== Band members ==
- Victoria Terziyska – vocals
- Desislav Danchev – guitar
- Vladislav Hristov – drums
- Kirill "Kireding" Dikov – bass

== Discography ==
- Iгуана (2001)
- Репетиция (2003)
- Ела до мен (2006)
- В ръцете ти е най-добре (compilation, 2012)

== See also ==
- Bulgarian music
