= Grafa (musician) =

Bulgarian musician (born 1978)

Vladimir Kirilov Ampov (Bulgarian: Владимир Кирилов Ампов) (born July 21, 1978), known by his stage name Grafa (Графа), is a prolific Bulgarian pop singer, composer, and music producer.

For a number of years he was a coach at the Bulgarian reality singing competition Glasat na Bulgaria.

For many years he was a recipient of multiple "Song of the Year"/"Singer of the Year" and the like awards and released many albums.

In 2012 he was number 3 on the celebrities list of the Forbes Bulgaria magazine.

== Personal ==
Grafa is the son of musicians Toni Ampova and Kiril Ampov, best known for the trio "Спешен случай", and has a sister, Nora.
