= Signal (band) =

Bulgarian rock band

Signal (Bulgarian: Сигнал) is a Bulgarian rock band, most popular in the 1980s and 1990s.

== History ==
The band was established in 1978 in Sofia by: Yordan Karadzhov(vocal), Georgi Kokalov – drums, Rumen Spasov – guitar and Hristo Lambrev – piano.

== Members ==
- Yordan Karadzhov (Йордан Караджов) – vocals, bass guitar
- Vladimir Zahariev (Владимир Захариев) – drums
- Alexander Marinovsky (Александър Мариновски) – guitar
- Georgi Yanakiev (Георги Янакиев) – bass guitar

== Discography ==
Year	Title		English translation	Record label
1979	ВЕЧЕН КРЪСТОПЪТ	Vechen Krustoput	Eternal Crossroad	BALKANTON
1980	ПОПЪТЕН ВЯТЪР	Poputen Vyatur	Fair Wind	BALKANTON
1981	КАСКАДЬОРИ	Kaskadyori	Daredevils	BALKANTON
1983	СИГНАЛ 4	Signal 4	Signal 4	BALKANTON
1983	ДЕЧО ТАРАЛЕЖКОВ И СИГНАЛ	Decho Taralezhkov i Signal	Decho Taralezhkov and Signal	BALKANTON
1986	ВУНДЕРКИНД	Vunderkind	Prodigy	BALKANTON
1987	Вкусете Живота	Vkusete Zhivota	Taste the Life	UBP International
1992	ШОУТО ТРЯБВА ДА ПРОДЪЛЖИ	Shouto Tryabva Da Produlzhi	Show Must Go On	Riva Sound
1994	Сигнал, Най-доброто	Signal, Nay-Dobroto	Signal, The best	UBP International
1995	МЕЖДУ АД И РАЙ	Mezhdu Ad i Ray	Between Hell And Heaven	ARA Audio-Video
1998	Цветя	Tsvetya	Flowers	UBP International
1999	Сигналистика	Signalistika	Signalistics	UBP International
2003	На живо	Na Zhivo	Live	StefKos Music
2005	Черно-белият	Cherno-Beliyat	The Black-White album	Varna Sound
2008	Сигнал – Златна колекция	Signal-Zlatna kolektsiya	Signal-Golden Collection	StefKos Music
