= B.T.R. (band) =

Bulgarian heavy metal band

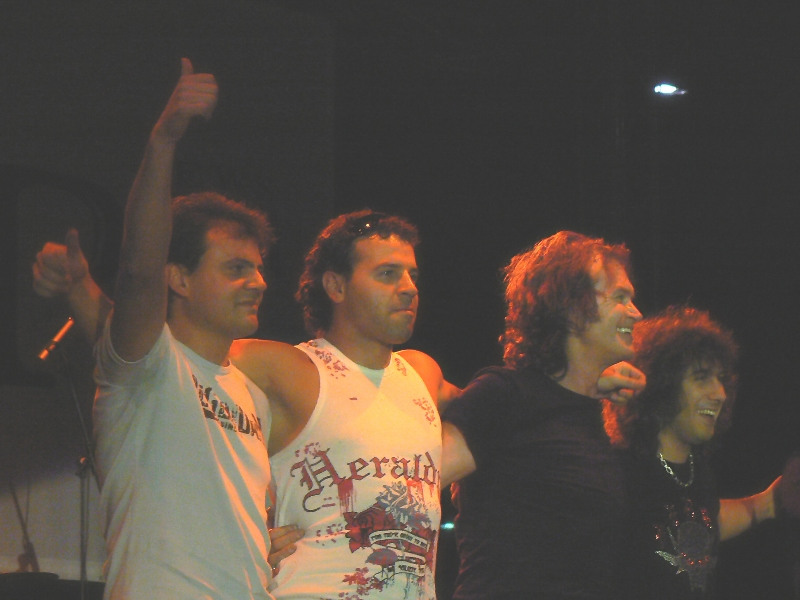
- B.T.R. with special guest Glenn Hughes

Background information
- Origin: Sofia, Bulgaria
- Genres: Heavy Metal, Hard rock
- Years active: 1984–present
- Members: Atanas "Nasko" Penev (vocals) Slavcho Nickolov (vocals & guitars); Ivan Kalfov (vocals & bass guitar); Ilian Dikov (drums) Kiril Bojkov (guitars)

B.T.R. is a Bulgarian heavy metal band founded in 1984.

== History ==
=== Formation and early years (1984–1993) ===
B.T.R. was established in 1984 but broke up in 1986. During its early years, nearly thirty musicians played with the band. B.T.R. played live for the first time at a rock festival in Troyan, Bulgaria in 1990. In their first album, the band consisted of Hristo Angov (vocals), Valentine Guevski (guitar), Kiril Bozhkov (guitar), Ivan Kalfov (bass), and Georgi Milev (drums).

Their first album was released by Riva Sound as a live album, with a performance which took place at the Valentin Andreev Hall on January 29,1992. In 1993 B.T.R. released their first studio album, "Bending the Rules". The album consisted of powerful heavy metal tracks and melodic ballads. It was distributed by Unison - RTM and became one of Bulgaria's best-selling albums in 1993.

=== New members and international success (1993–2004) ===
Since 1993 B.T.R. consisted of Kiril Bojkov (guitar), Ivan Kalfov (vocals, bass guitar), Ilian Dikov (drums), Slavcho Nikolov (guitar, vocals) and Atanas "Nasko" Penev (vocals). Their first album with this lineup was "Feel the Life" and it consisted of traditional heavy metal tracks. Following extensive promotion in small clubs and concert halls, the band made an impression in France and had positive reception amongst the French fans. B.T.R.'s arrival in Nice coincided with the soccer victory of Bulgaria over France, and the band was later invited to play soccer with the semi-professional University of Nice soccer team.

In 1994, the band was invited to play in F.R.A.C.A, a large musical forum in Southern France in which over 20 bands performed. A year later, the band opened for Iron Maiden in Sofia.

=== Mainstream success ===
In 1997, "B.T.R. '97" was released, which was a significant step forward for the band. The album was actually recorded in 1996, but not released until a year after. Amongst the songs was perhaps one of B.T.R.'s most recognized songs, "Elmaz i Staklo" (Diamond and Glass). Following the critical success of "'97", the band was again invited to perform in the French festival "Cosmopoliten", featuring various international acts.

B.T.R.'s 7 Ballads is one of their best-selling albums

1998 marked the release of the hit single Salvation, their most acclaimed song to date. The song became an anthem of the anti-drug movement in Bulgaria and received considerable airtime on radio stations all over the country. December of the same year the album 7 Ballads was released, which includes Salvation and various songs from Feel The Life, but all in Bulgarian. The album was also the first Bulgarian Enhanced Audio CD and features music videos for Salvation and Elmaz i Staklo, as well as interviews from all the band members.

In 1999 the band recorded Dreams. It differs from previous albums in style, and features more complex compositions, as well as a more melodic style, with more developed lyrics. Their first single Flower from the Moon was an instant success. Both the album and the single reached the number one spot in many different billboards across the country. The album followed with extensive touring, different sponsors (over 30 gigs), and many of the venues being sold out.

In the year 2000, the band continued their touring and opened in the Romanian festival Golden Stag with bands INXS and UB40. At the end of the year, the band also made another appearance in China.

In 2002, they released The Game, followed by their most well-known performance, in the National Palace of Culture with a special guest Glenn Hughes, the bass player of Deep Purple. Together they played some of Deep Purple's biggest hits, such as Stormbringer and Mistreated. The concert also featured a symphonic orchestra for two of their songs.

From 2003 onwards, the band has played countless shows in many countries, and has also played in Beijing, recording Meet in Beijing. B.T.R. also visited Vietnam where a recorded show of the band was watched by over 50 million Vietnamese people.

In 2008, the band released Deja Vu, which contains covers of famous Bulgarian rock songs. They were also voted Band Of The Year by Bulgarian audiences.

In 2009, they toured in over 13 cities in Bulgaria.

On March 15, 2014 the band played a concert in Toronto, Canada.

== Discography ==
Year	Title
1992	Live
1993	Bending the Rules
1993	Feel The Life
1997	B.T.R.
1998	Seven Ballads
1999	Dreams
2002	The Game
2004	93-04 1
2006	93-06 2
2008	Deja Vu
2014	Why
2018	Invisible Walls
2021	Puzzle
