= Camelia =

Camelia may refer to:

- Camelia (singer) (born 1974), Malaysian singer and model
- Camelia (actress) (1919–1950), Egyptian actress
- Camelia (name), a list of people with the name
- Camelia, a character in the telenovela Camelia la Texana
- Camelia, the mascot of the Raku programming language
- Camelia (1954 film), a Mexican film
- USS Camelia (1862), an American ship
- 957 Camelia, an asteroid

== See also ==
- Camellia (disambiguation)
- Kamelia
