= Capotillo =

Capotillo may refer to

- Capotillo (FB 101), a Dominican Navy ship which originally was the American lighthouse tender USLHT Camellia
- Ensanche Capotillo, a sector of the city of Santo Domingo in the Dominican Republic
- Capotillo, Dajabón, a municipal district in Loma de Cabrera, Dajabón Province, Dominican Republic
