= Glasat na Bulgaria season 7 =

Seventh series of Glasat na Bulgaria

Glasat na Bulgaria
- Season 7
- Promotional poster featuring coaches Grafa, Kamelia, Mihaela Fileva and Ivan Lechev
- Hosted by: Pavell; Venci Venc'; Alexandra Bogdanska (backstage)
- Coaches: Ivan Lechev; Mihaela Fileva; Kamelia; Grafa
- Winner: Georgi Shopov
- Winning coach: Ivan Lechev
- Runner-up: Joana Sashova

Release
- Original network: bTV
- Original release: 23 February – 14 June 2020

Season chronology
- ← Previous; Season 6 Next → Season 8

The seventh season of the Bulgarian reality singing competition Glasat na Bulgaria premiered on February 23, 2020, and was broadcast every Sunday at 20:00 until June 14, 2020, on bTV. Kamelia, Grafa, Ivan Lechev returned for their fourth season as coaches on the show while Mihaela Fileva returned for her second season.

Georgi Shopov from Team Lechev was crowned the "voice" of Bulgaria. This marked Ivan Lechev's third win as a coach and was also the first time in Glasat na Bulgaria's history that a stolen artist and an artist whose coach was blocked during their blind audition (Fileva blocking Lechev) went on to win the season.

== Coaches ==
Coaches of season 6 of Glasat na Bulgaria

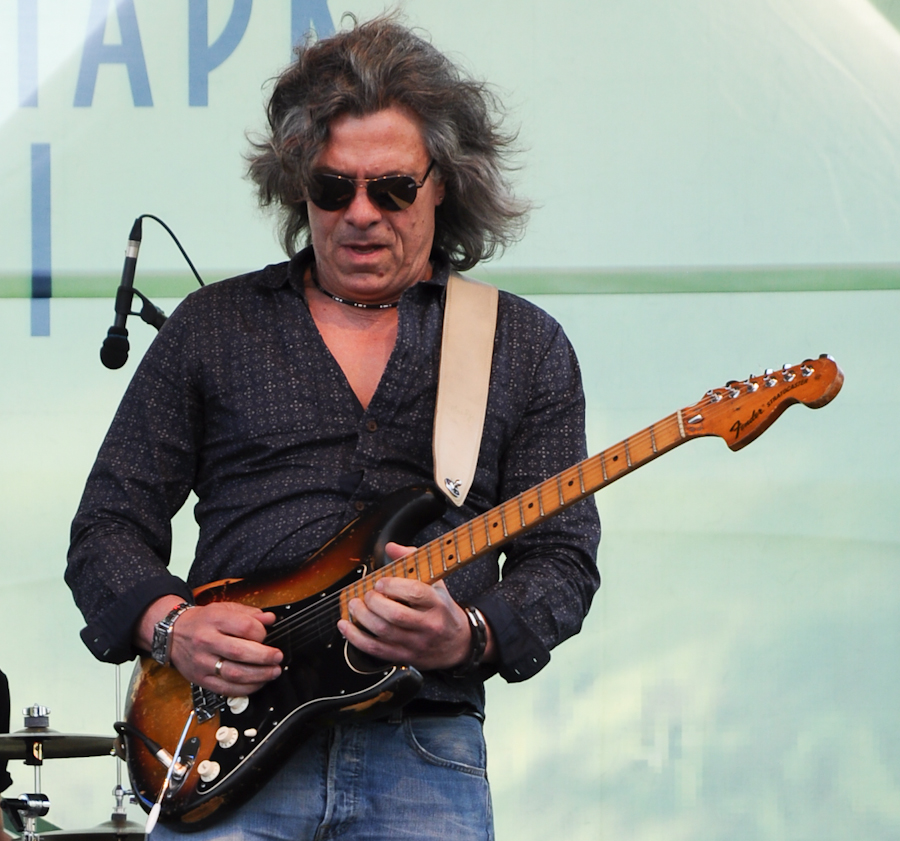
Ivan Lechev

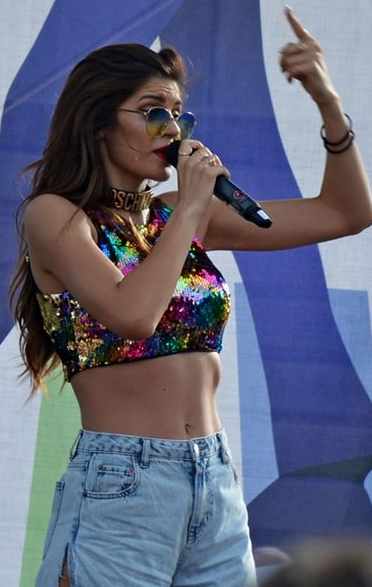
Mihaela Fileva

Kamelia

Grafa

All coaches returned from the last season, with this being second season for Mihaela Fileva and fourth for Kamelia, Grafa and Ivan Lechev.

Pavell & Venci Venc' also returned for their fourth consecutive season as host. This year Aleksandra Bogdanska was introduced as the new V Reporter, who made online backstage episodes for the website of the show.

== Teams ==
- Winner
- Runner-up
- Third place
- Fourth place
- Eliminated in the Live shows
- Eliminated in the Knockouts
- Stolen in the Battles
- Eliminated in the Battles

Coaching teams
Coaches	Top 49 Artists				
Ivan Lechev					
Ivan Lechev	Georgi Shopov	Plamen Bonev	Kalina Velkovska	Almir Ismaili	Rada Ilieva
Ivan Lechev	Maria Minkova	Svet and Hihi	Boil Karaneychev	~~Pavell i Martin~~	Two A
Ivan Lechev	Filip Dimitrov	Arzu & Silvana	Aleyna Alexandrova	Plamena Andreeva	
Mihaela Fileva					
Mihaela Fileva	Elena Sirakova	Ilin Papazyan	Svetoslav Georgiev	Georgi Ishbehov	Kristiana Atanasova
Mihaela Fileva	Nikoleta Doycheva	Kristina Jechkova	Trio Viva	~~Alexander Georgiev~~	~~Gergana Uzunova~~
Mihaela Fileva	Bilyana Dobreva	Angel Prodanov	Ruth-Constance Koynarska	Ognyan Yordanov	
Kamelia					
Kamelia	Kerana	Kristina Doncheva	Hristo Vasilev	Petya Georgieva	Mihail Dimov
Kamelia	Hristina Hristova	Pavel and Martin	Omar Dzaferoski	~~Almir Ismaili~~	Polina Dimitrova
Kamelia	Alexandra Bacheva	Aleksandra Kuzina	Teofania Garavela	Maria Gogusheva	
Grafa					
Grafa	Joana Sashova	Alexander Georgiev	Alexander Slavchev	Ivan Lazarov	Gergana Uzunova
Grafa	Veneta Tsoneva	Julia Cavanyoli	Zlatka Kantardzhieva-Zaria	~~Georgi Shopov~~	~~Omar Dzaferoski~~
Grafa	~~Trio Viva~~	~~Nikoleta Doycheva~~	Stefan Manasievic	Tsevetelina Lazova	Katrin Gacheva
Note: Underlined names are artists who were stolen by other coach in the Battles and advanced to the Knockout Round.

== Blind Auditions ==
For this season, the "Block Button" returned with a slight change. When the coach gets block by another coach, the chair of blocked coach won't turn. Each coach will receive also only one block for the entire blind auditions.

Color Key

✔	Coach pressed "I WANT YOU" button
	Artist defaulted to a coach's team
	Artist elected a coach's team
	Artist was eliminated with no coach pressing their button
✘	Coach pressed "I WANT YOU" button, but was:
	Blocked by Ivan; Blocked by Mihaela; Blocked by Kamelia; Blocked by Grafa

=== Episode 1 (February 23, 2020) ===
Order	Artist	Age	Hometown	Song	Coach's and artist's choices			
Order	Artist	Age	Hometown	Song	Ivan	Mihaela	Kamelia	Grafa
1	Kristina Doncheva	19	Burgas	"Habibi"	✔	✔	✔	✔
2	Valeriya Vasilenko	16	Sofia	"Hearts Ain't Gonna Lie"	—	—	—	—
3	Alexander Georgiev	20	Manchester	"Thinking Out Loud"	✔	✔	✔	✔
4	Pamela Apsi	23	Sofia	"Liar"	—	—	—	—
5	Alexander Slavchev	31	Ruse	"Pony"	✔	✔	✔	✔
6	Hristo Vasilev	25	Varna	"Porotsi"	✔	✔	✔	✔
7	Joana Sashova	17	Kyustendil	"Feeling Good"	✔	—	✔	✔
8	Kalina Velkovska	35	Skopje	"This World"	✔	✔*	✔	✘

- Mihaela's name appeared on the LED floor when she pressed her button for Kalina Velkovska, but her chair did not turn around.

=== Episode 2 (March 1, 2020) ===
Order	Artist	Age	Hometown	Song	Coach's and artist's choices			
Order	Artist	Age	Hometown	Song	Ivan	Mihaela	Kamelia	Grafa
1	Kerana	27	Plovdiv	"Comeback"	✔	✔	✔	✘
2	Leyana Lakroa	19	London	"Issues"	—	—	—	—
3	Ilin Papazyan	20	Sliven	"Redbone"	✔	✔	✔	✔
4	Mellisa Alexandrova	25	Svishtov	"Tryabva da znam"	—	—	—	—
5	Aleyna Alexandrova	17	Svishtov	"Keep the Faith"	✔	—	✔	✔
6	Jay Curley	24	Dominican Republic	"Calma"	—	—	—	—
7	Tsevetelina Lazova	22	Sofia	"I Got You"	✔	✔	✔	✔
8	Pavel & Martin	22	Sofia	"Bodies"	✔	✔	✔	✔
9	Kristina Jechkova	19	Kyiv	"Elmaz I Staklo"	✔	✔	✔	✔

=== Episode 3 (March 8, 2020) ===
Order	Artist	Аge	Hometown	Song	Coach's and artist's choices			
Order	Artist	Аge	Hometown	Song	Ivan	Mihaela	Kamelia	Grafa
1	Petya Georgieva	18	Ruse	"Bulgarka"/"Da"/"Latino Señorita"	✔	✔	✔	✔
2	Cassandra Warnes	23	Stordal	"Release Me"	—	—	—	—
3	Svetoslav Georgiev	25	Varna	"Too Close"	—	✔	—	✔
4	Rumyana Radeva	17	Shumen	"Confident"	—	—	—	—
5	Omar Dzaferoski	18	Skopje	"Gromovi Na Dusa"	✔	✔	✔	✔
6	Ruth-Constance Koynarska	20	Stara Zagora	"O mio babbino caro"	✔	✔	—	—
7	David Angelov	34	Vratsa	"Pitash Za Men"	—	—	—	—
8	Rada Ilieva	17	Sofia	"Po-poleka"	✔	✔	—	✔
9	Georgi Shopov	43	Varna	"Fool for Your Loving"	✘	✔	✔	✔

=== Episode 4 (March 15, 2020) ===
Order	Artist	Age	Hometown	Song	Coach's and artist's choices			
Order	Artist	Age	Hometown	Song	Ivan	Mihaela	Kamelia	Grafa
1	Kristiana Atanasova	16	Shumen	"Mercy On Me"	✔	✔	✔	✔
2	Konstantin Kandev	19	Sofia	"Crawling"	—	—	—	—
3	Nikoleta Doycheva	29	Burgas	"Prituri Se Planinata"	✔	—	—	✔
4	Juan Guzman	29	Ecuador	"Tutu"	—	—	—	—
5	Mariya Gogusheva	20	Petrich	"Dusk Till Dawn"	✔	✔	✔	✔
6	Zheko Zhekov	24	Burgas	"Human"	—	—	—	—
7	Boil Karaneychev	21	Burgas	"I Don't Want to Be"	✔	—	—	✔
8	Almir Ismaili	32	Skopje	"Rehab"	✔	—	✔	✔
9	Elena Sirakova	27	Sofia	"Is It A Crime"	✔	✔	✔	✔

=== Episode 5 (March 22, 2020) ===
During the episode, Grafa performerd his song "Davam vsichko za teb".

Order	Artist	Age	Hometown	Song	Coach's and artist's choices			
Order	Artist	Age	Hometown	Song	Ivan	Mihaela	Kamelia	Grafa
1	Trio Viva	18	Sofia	"Don't Let Go"	✔	✔	✔	✔
2	Angel Prodanov	24	Sofia	"Nyama Rabota Za Hora Kato Men"	—	✔	✔	—
3	Shanti	37	Italy	"Bella Ciao"	—	—	—	—
4	Veneta Tsoneva	26	Plovdiv	"No Roots"	✔	—	—	✔
5	Deivid Milenov	22	Shumen	"Olabilir/"Moyto vsichko"	—	—	—	—
6	Gergana Uzunova	16	Sliven	"idontwannabeyouanymore"	—	✔	—	✔
7	Rosen Emilov	27	Plovdiv	"Completely"	—	—	—	—
8	Hristina Hristova	24	Pleven	"Nevinost"	—	✔	✔	✔
9	Plamen Bonev	41	Chirpan	"Way Down We Go"	✔	✔	✘*	✔

- Despite Kamelia being blocked by Grafa for Plamen Bonev, Kamelia was still able to turn her chair around as they pressed their buttons at the same time.

=== Episode 6 (March 29, 2020) ===
Order	Artist	Age	Hometown	Song	Coach's and artist's choices			
Order	Artist	Age	Hometown	Song	Ivan	Mihaela	Kamelia	Grafa
1	Polina Dimitrova	22	Sofia	"Vezden Rada"	✔	✔	✔	✔
2	Teodor Tsvetkov	25	Vidin	"All The Small Things"	—	—	—	—
3	Ognyan Yordanov	29	Tryavna	"Despacito"	—	✔	—	✔
4	Maria Minkova	16	Stara Zagora	"Smells Like Teen Spirit"	✔	—	—	✔
5	Ivan Ivanov	19	Parvomay	"Shesto Chuvstvo"	—	—	—	—
6	Zlatka Kantardzhieva-Zaria	28	Yambol	"Then"	—	—	✔	✔
7	Stefan Manasievic	25	Skopje	"Don't Stop Me Now"	—	—	—	✔
8	Andrea Nacheva	17	Razgrad	"Nothing Breaks Like a Heart"	—	—	—	—
9	Arzu & Silvana	17 & 18	Kaspichan	"Slyap den"	✔	—	✔	✔
10	Mihail Dimov	33	Odesa	"My Baby You"	✔	—	✔	✔

==== Unaired auditions ====
Only a few seconds from them were aired on television. The whole auditions were published on YouTube.

Artist	Age	Hometown	Song	Coach's and artist's choices			
Artist	Age	Hometown	Song	Ivan	Mihaela	Kamelia	Grafa
Katrin Gacheva	18	Plovdiv	"Toxic"	—	—	✔	✔
Plamena Andreeva	32	Plovdiv	"Ironic"	✔	—	—	—
Svet & Hihi	34 & 30	Sofia	"Dzhalma"	✔	—	—	—
Aleksandra Kuzina	33	Vladivostok	"The Winner Takes It All"	—	—	✔	—
Teofania Garavela	18	Thessaloniki	"Lovely"	—	—	✔	—

=== Episode 7 (April 5, 2020) ===
Order	Artist	Age	Hometown	Song	Coach's and artist's choices			
Order	Artist	Age	Hometown	Song	Ivan	Mihaela	Kamelia	Grafa
1	Bilyana Dobreva	19	Pleven	"Dangerous Woman"	—	✔	✔	✔
2	Traycho Yankov	17	Sofia	"Mazhko priznanie"	—	—	—	—
3	Filip Dimitrov	26	Sofia	"Heart-Shaped Box"	✔	✔	✔	—
4	Alexandra Bacheva	15	Zlatitsa	"Osudeni dushi"	—	—	✔	—
5	Devana Georgievska	25	Skopje	"Perhaps, Perhaps, Perhaps"	—	—	Team full	—
6	Two A	19	Plovdiv	"Da sme tam"	✔	—	Team full	—
7	Julia Cavanyoli	21	Mantua	"Adagio"	Team full	✔	Team full	✔
8	Desislava Nikolova	25	Sofia	"Iskam da bada s teb"	Team full	—	Team full	Team full
9	Georgi Ishbehov	31	Koprivlen	"New York, New York"	Team full	✔	Team full	Team full
10	Ivan Lazarov	25	Dobrich	"Zaedno"	✔	✔	✔	✔

== The Battles ==
The Battles began on April 12, 2020. Back from past seasons, each coaches are given two "Steals" to save losing contestant in their respective battle from other team.

Artist won the Battle and advanced to the Knockouts
Artist lost the Battle but was stolen by another coach and advanced to the Knockouts
Artist lost the Battle and was eliminated

Episode	Order	Coach	Winner	Song	Loser	'Steal' result			
Episode	Order	Coach	Winner	Song	Loser	Ivan	Mihaela	Kamelia	Grafa
Episode 8 (April 12, 2020)	1	Grafa	Ivan Lazarov	"All Right Now"	Georgi Shopov	✔	✔	—	—N/a
Episode 8 (April 12, 2020)	2	Kamelia	Kristina Doncheva	"Mercy"	Maria Gogusheva	—	—	—N/a	—
Episode 8 (April 12, 2020)	3	Ivan Lechev	Kalina Velkovska	"Ex's & Oh's"	Plamena Andreeva	—N/a	—	—	—
Episode 8 (April 12, 2020)	4	Mihaela Fileva	Ilin Papazyan	"Señorita"	Gergana Uzunova	✔	—N/a	—	✔
Episode 8 (April 12, 2020)	5	Ivan Lechev	Maria Minkova	"Head Above Water"	Aleyna Alexandrova	—N/a	—	—	—
Episode 8 (April 12, 2020)	6	Mihaela Fileva	Elena Sirakova	"You Are The Reason"	Alexander Georgiev	✔	—N/a	✔	✔
Episode 9 (April 19, 2020)	1	Kamelia	Kerana	"Blurred Lines"	Almir Ismaili	✔	✔	—N/a	Team Full
Episode 9 (April 19, 2020)	2	Mihaela Fileva	Svetoslav Georgiev	"Lonely Boy"	Ognyan Yordanov	Team Full	—N/a	—	Team Full
Episode 9 (April 19, 2020)	3	Ivan Lechev	Svet & Hihi	"Pezen za chervenata shapchitsa"	Arzu & Silvana	Team Full	—	—	Team Full
Episode 9 (April 19, 2020)	4	Mihaela Fileva	Georgi Ishbehov	"Minavash Prez Men"	Ruth-Constance Koynarska	Team Full	—N/a	—	Team Full
Episode 9 (April 19, 2020)	5	Kamelia	Hristo Vasilev	"Meant To Be"	Teofania Garavela	Team Full	—	—N/a	Team Full
Episode 9 (April 19, 2020)	6	Grafa	Joana Sashova	"Lale li si, Zyumbyul li si"	Nikoleta Doycheva	Team Full	✔	—	Team Full
Episode 10 (April 26, 2020)	1	Grafa	Veneta Tsoneva	"I'm So Excited"	Trio Viva	Team Full	✔	✔	Team Full
Episode 10 (April 26, 2020)	2	Kamelia	Mihail Dimov	"Who Wants To Live Forever"	Alexandra Kuzina	Team Full	Team Full	—N/a	Team Full
Episode 10 (April 26, 2020)	3	Grafa	Alexander Slavchev	"We Don't Talk Anymore"	Tsevetelina Lazova	Team Full	Team Full	—	Team Full
Episode 10 (April 26, 2020)	4	Kamelia	Petya Georgieva	"Parviyat Chovek"	Alexandra Bacheva	Team Full	Team Full	—N/a	Team Full
Episode 10 (April 26, 2020)	5	Mihaela Fileva	Kristina Jechkova	"Perfect"	Angel Prodanov	Team Full	Team Full	—	Team Full
Episode 10 (April 26, 2020)	6	Ivan Lechev	Plamen Bonev	"Faith"	Pavel and Martin	Team Full	Team Full	✔	Team Full
Episode 11 (May 3, 2020)	1	Grafa	Julia Cavanyoli	"Shallow"	Omar Dzaferoski	Team Full	Team Full	✔	Team Full
Episode 11 (May 3, 2020)	2	Ivan Lechev	Boil Karaneychev	"Here Without You"	Filip Dimitrov	Team Full	Team Full	Team Full	Team Full
Episode 11 (May 3, 2020)	3	Mihaela Fileva	Kristiana Atanasova	"Sucker"	Bilyana Dobreva	Team Full	Team Full	Team Full	Team Full
Episode 11 (May 3, 2020)	4	Grafa	Zlatka Kantardzhieva	"I Don't Care"	Stefan Manasievic ^{1}	Team Full	Team Full	Team Full	Team Full
Episode 11 (May 3, 2020)	4	Grafa	Zlatka Kantardzhieva	"I Don't Care"	Katrin Gacheva ^{1}	Team Full	Team Full	Team Full	Team Full
Episode 11 (May 3, 2020)	5	Ivan Lechev	Rada Ilieva	"Malkite Neshta"	Two A	Team Full	Team Full	Team Full	Team Full
Episode 11 (May 3, 2020)	6	Kamelia	Hristina Hristova	"Ah, Kade E Moyto Libe"	Polina Dimitrova	Team Full	Team Full	Team Full	Team Full

=== Notes ===
- ^1 Grafa conducted a three-way battle which is the first time in the Bulgarian version of the franchise.

== Knockouts ==
The Knockout Round take place on May 10, 2020. Every team is composed of six contestant from their team and two contestants whom stolen from other team for the total of eight contestants. Addition to this season, "Spectator Theft" was added. A power given to audience and televiewers to save one losing contestant in the Knockout rounds via online voting.

Color key

Artist given a chair and advanced to the Live Shows
Artist was given a chair but later eliminated in favor of another artist
Artist eliminated on Knockouts but was saved by public audience
Artist was eliminated automatically by not giving chair

Episode	Coach	Order	Artist	Song	Chair given	Artist removed	Final result	Chair #1	Chair #2	Chair #3
Episode 12 (May 10, 2020)	Kamelia	1	Kristina Doncheva	"River"	1	–	Advanced	Kristina Doncheva	—	—
Episode 12 (May 10, 2020)	Kamelia	2	Omar Dzhaferoski	"Someone You Loved"	2	–	Eliminated	Kristina Doncheva	Omar Dzhaferoski	—
Episode 12 (May 10, 2020)	Kamelia	3	Petya Georgieva	"Into You"	2	–	Eliminated	Kristina Doncheva	Petya Georgieva	Omar Dzhaferoski
Episode 12 (May 10, 2020)	Kamelia	4	Mihail Dimov	"Pechat ot moyata dusha"	3	Omar Dzhaferoski	Eliminated	Kristina Doncheva	Petya Georgieva	Mihail Dimov
Episode 12 (May 10, 2020)	Kamelia	5	Pavel i Martin	"In The End"	Not Given	–	Eliminated	Kristina Doncheva	Petya Georgieva	Mihail Dimov
Episode 12 (May 10, 2020)	Kamelia	6	Hristina Hristova	"Sartse"	3	Mihail Dimov	Eliminated	Kristina Doncheva	Petya Georgieva	Hristina Hristova
Episode 12 (May 10, 2020)	Kamelia	7	Hristo Vasilev	"How You Remind Me"	2	Hristina Hristova	Advanced	Kristina Doncheva	Hristo Vasilev	Petya Georgieva
Episode 12 (May 10, 2020)	Kamelia	8	Kerana	"No Diggity"	1	Petya Georgieva	Advanced	Kerana	Kristina Doncheva	Hristo Vasilev
Episode 13 (May 17, 2020)	Grafa	1	Veneta Tsoneva	"Higher Love"	1	–	Eliminated	Veneta Tsoneva	—	—
Episode 13 (May 17, 2020)	Grafa	2	Alexander Slavchev	"Can't Feel My Face"	1	–	Advanced	Alexander Slavchev	Veneta Tsoneva	—
Episode 13 (May 17, 2020)	Grafa	3	Zlatka Kantardzhieva-Zaria	"Lost On You"	2	–	Eliminated	Alexander Slavchev	Zlatka Kantardzhieva-Zaria	Veneta Tsoneva
Episode 13 (May 17, 2020)	Grafa	4	Ivan Lazarov	"Blow"	1	Veneta Tsoneva	Advanced	Ivan Lazarov	Alexander Slavchev	Zlatka Kantardzhieva-Zaria
Episode 13 (May 17, 2020)	Grafa	5	Julia Cavanyoli	"Take Me Home"	Not Given	–	Eliminated	Ivan Lazarov	Alexander Slavchev	Zlatka Kantardzhieva-Zaria
Episode 13 (May 17, 2020)	Grafa	6	Joana Sashova	"Mama Knows Best"	2	Zlatka Kantardzhieva-Zaria	Advanced	Ivan Lazarov	Joana Sashova	Alexander Slavchev
Episode 13 (May 17, 2020)	Grafa	7	Gergana Uzunova	"Don't Start Now"	Not Given	–	Eliminated	Ivan Lazarov	Joana Sashova	Alexander Slavchev
Episode 13 (May 17, 2020)	Grafa	8	Alexander Georgiev	"I'll Be There"	Not Given	–	Saved by Public	Ivan Lazarov	Joana Sashova	Alexander Slavchev
Episode 14 (May 24, 2020)	Ivan Lechev	1	Kalina Velkovska	"Kiss"	1	–	Advanced	Kalina Velkovska	—	—
Episode 14 (May 24, 2020)	Ivan Lechev	2	Boil Karaneychev	"Run To You"	2	–	Eliminated	Kalina Velkovska	Boil Karaneychev	—
Episode 14 (May 24, 2020)	Ivan Lechev	3	Rada Ilieva	"The Scientist"	3	–	Eliminated	Kalina Velkovska	Boil Karaneychev	Rada Ilieva
Episode 14 (May 24, 2020)	Ivan Lechev	4	Georgi Shopov	"The Best"	2	Rada Ilieva	Advanced	Kalina Velkovska	Georgi Shopov	Boil Karaneychev
Episode 14 (May 24, 2020)	Ivan Lechev	5	Svet and Hihi	"A Whole New World"	Not Given	–	Eliminated	Kalina Velkovska	Georgi Shopov	Boil Karaneychev
Episode 14 (May 24, 2020)	Ivan Lechev	6	Almir Ismaili	"Giant"	3	Boil Karaneychev	Eliminated	Kalina Velkovska	Georgi Shopov	Almir Ismaili
Episode 14 (May 24, 2020)	Ivan Lechev	7	Maria Minkova	"Zombie"	Not Given	–	Eliminated	Kalina Velkovska	Georgi Shopov	Almir Ismaili
Episode 14 (May 24, 2020)	Ivan Lechev	8	Plamen Bonev	"Make You Feel My Love"	1	Almir Ismaili	Advanced	Plamen Bonev	Kalina Velkovska	Georgi Shopov
Episode 15 (May 31, 2020)	Mihaela Fileva	1	Trio Viva	"No"	1	–	Eliminated	Trio Viva	—	—
Episode 15 (May 31, 2020)	Mihaela Fileva	2	Ilin Papazyan	"Shape of My Heart"	1	–	Advanced	Ilin Papazyan	Trio Viva	—
Episode 15 (May 31, 2020)	Mihaela Fileva	3	Kristina Jechkova	"History Repeating"	3	–	Eliminated	Ilin Papazyan	Trio Viva	Kristina Jechkova
Episode 15 (May 31, 2020)	Mihaela Fileva	4	Nikoleta Doycheva	"Bela sam, bela yunache"	2	Kristina Jechkova	Eliminated	Ilin Papazyan	Nikoleta Doycheva	Trio Viva
Episode 15 (May 31, 2020)	Mihaela Fileva	5	Svetoslav Georgiev	"Give Me One Reason"	2	Trio Viva	Advanced	Ilin Papazyan	Svetoslav Georgiev	Nikoleta Doycheva
Episode 15 (May 31, 2020)	Mihaela Fileva	6	Kristiana Atanasova	"God Is A Woman"	3	Nikoleta Doycheva	Eliminated	Ilin Papazyan	Svetoslav Georgiev	Kristiana Atanasova
Episode 15 (May 31, 2020)	Mihaela Fileva	7	Georgi Ishbehov	"Waves"	Not Given	–	Eliminated	Ilin Papazyan	Svetoslav Georgiev	Kristiana Atanasova
Episode 15 (May 31, 2020)	Mihaela Fileva	8	Elena Sirakova	"Best Part"	1	Kristiana Atanasova	Advanced	Elena Sirakova	Ilin Papazyan	Svetoslav Georgiev

== Live Shows (Live Concerts) ==
For this season, live concerts is reduced to two episodes from typically three or four shows. Live showdowns was removed in this season thus making only live shows divided to two, which is the semi-finals and the Finals. Also, Live concerts are filmed without audiences due to COVID-19 pandemic.

Color key:

Artist advanced to the finale from the public's vote
Artist was eliminated

=== Week 1: Semi-final (June 7, 2020) ===
==== Episode 16 ====
Order	Coach	Artist	Song	Result
1	Mihaela Fileva	Elena Sirakova	"Crazy in Love"	Advanced
2	Grafa	Ivan Lazarov	"No Good"	Eliminated
3	Ivan Lechev	Plamen Bonev	"Rolling in the Deep"	Advanced
4	Kamelia	Hristo Vasilev	"Hit the Road Jack"	Eliminated
5	Ivan Lechev	Kalina Velkovska	"Here"	Eliminated
6	Grafa	Alexander Georgiev	"I'm Not the Only One"	Advanced
7	Grafa	Alexander Slavchev	"That's What I Like"	Eliminated
8	Kamelia	Kerana	"Az li sam ili ne"	Advanced
9	Mihaela Fileva	Svetoslav Georgiev	"Say Something"	Eliminated
10	Grafa	Joana Sashova	"Tsiganska svatba"	Advanced
11	Ivan Lechev	Georgi Shopov	"Come Together"	Advanced
12	Mihaela Fileva	Ilin Papazyan	"Isn't She Lovely"	Advanced
13	Kamelia	Kristina Doncheva	"Never Enough"	Advanced

=== Week 2: Final (June 14, 2020) ===
==== Episode 17 ====
Round	Order	Coach	Artist	Song	Result
One
One	1	Grafa	Alexander Georgiev	"Señorita"	Eliminated
One	2	Mihaela Fileva	Elena Sirakova	"Lovely"	Advanced
One	3	Ivan Lechev	Georgi Shopov	"Priyateli"	Advanced
One	4	Kamelia	Kristina Doncheva	"Survivor"	Eliminated
One	5	Mihaela Fileva	Ilin Papazyan	"Blinding Lights"	Eliminated
One	6	Grafa	Joana Sashova	"100 zhivota"	Advanced
One	7	Kamelia	Kerana	"Dirty Diana"	Advanced
One	8	Ivan Lechev	Plamen Bonev	"See You Again"	Eliminated
Two	1	Mihaela Fileva	Elena Sirakova	"Fallin'"	Fourth place
Two	2	Grafa	Joana Sashova	"Uteha"	Runner-up
Two	3	Ivan Lechev	Georgi Shopov	"Dust in the Wind"	Winner
Two	4	Kamelia	Kerana	"Praying"	Third place

== Elimination Chart ==
=== Overall ===
Color key
Artist's info

- Artist from Team Lechev
- Artist from Team Mihaela
- Artist from Team Kamelia
- Artist from Team Grafa

Result details

- Winner
- Runner-up
- Third place
- Fourth place
- Saved by the public
- Eliminated

Final Phase Results per week
Artists	Week 1 Semi-final	Week 2 Final	
Artists	Week 1 Semi-final	Round 1	Round 2
Georgi Shopov	Safe	Safe	Winner
Joana Sashova	Safe	Safe	Runner-up
Kerana	Safe	Safe	Third place
Elena Sirakova	Safe	Safe	Fourth place
Plamen Bonev	Safe	Eliminated	Eliminated (Final Round 1)
Alexander Georgiev	Safe	Eliminated	Eliminated (Final Round 1)
Kristina Doncheva	Safe	Eliminated	Eliminated (Final Round 1)
Ilin Papazyan	Safe	Eliminated	Eliminated (Final Round 1)
Kalina Velkovska	Eliminated	Eliminated (Week 1)	
Alexander Slavchev	Eliminated	Eliminated (Week 1)	
Ivan Lazarov	Eliminated	Eliminated (Week 1)	
Hristo Vasilev	Eliminated	Eliminated (Week 1)	
Svetoslav Georgiev	Eliminated	Eliminated (Week 1)	

=== Per team ===
Artists	Week 1 Semi-final	Week 2 Final	
Artists	Week 1 Semi-final	Round 1	Round 2
Georgi Shopov	Safe	Safe	Winner
Plamen Bonev	Safe	Eliminated	
Kalina Velkovska	Eliminated		
Elena Sirakova	Safe	Safe	Fourth place
Ilin Papazyan	Safe	Eliminated	
Svetoslav Georgiev	Eliminated		
Kerana	Safe	Safe	Third place
Kristina Doncheva	Safe	Eliminated	
Hristo Vasilev	Eliminated		
Joana Sashova	Safe	Safe	Runner-up
Alexander Georgiev	Safe	Eliminated	
Alexander Slavchev	Eliminated		
Ivan Lazarov	Eliminated		
