= Camellia (disambiguation) =

Camellia is a genus of flowering plants in the family Theaceae.

Camellia may also refer to:

- Camellia (cipher), a block cipher
- Camellia (poem), a poem by Rabindranath Tagore
- Camellia (company), British-owned group of agricultural companies
- Camellia (musician), a Japanese electronic music composer and producer.
- Camellia, New South Wales, a suburb in Sydney, Australia
- USLHT Camellia, a United States lighthouse tender
- Camellia, a character in Arc the Lad: Twilight of the Spirits
- Camellia, a codename for Redmi Note 10 5G
- Camellia City, a nickname for Sacramento, California
- "Camellia", 1975 single by Hall & Oates from Daryl Hall & John Oates
- "Camellia", 2020 single by Pentagon from Universe: The Black Hall

== See also ==
- Camelia (disambiguation)
- Camilla (disambiguation)
- Tsubaki (disambiguation), the Japanese word for Camellia
