= Glasat na Bulgaria season 6 =

Bulgarian reality singing competition

Glasat na Bulgaria
- Season 6
- Promotional poster featuring coaches Grafa, Mihaela Fileva, Kamelia and Ivan Lechev
- Hosted by: Pavell; Venci Venc'; Elina Markovska (backstage)
- Coaches: Ivan Lechev; Mihaela Fileva; Kamelia; Grafa
- Winner: Atanas Kateliev
- Winning coach: Grafa
- Runner-up: Kiril Hadzhiev-Tino

Release
- Original network: bTV
- Original release: 24 February – 9 June 2019

Season chronology
- Next → Season 7

The sixth season of the Bulgarian reality singing competition Glasat na Bulgaria premiered on February 24, 2019, and was broadcast at 20:00 every Sunday on bTV. Kamelia, Grafa and Ivan Lechev returned for their third consecutive season as the coaches and were joined by new coach Mihaela Fileva.

Atanas Kateliev of team Grafa was announced as the winner for this season, making it Grafa's first win as a coach of the show.

== Coaches and hosts ==
Coaches of season 6 of Glasat na Bulgaria

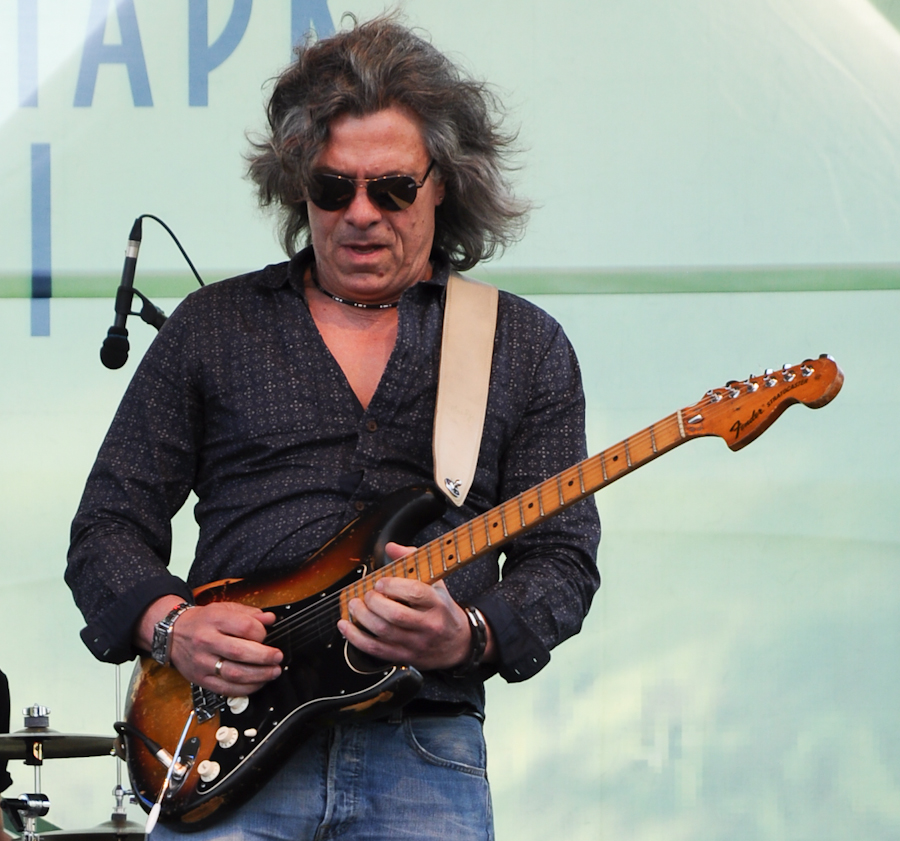
Ivan Lechev

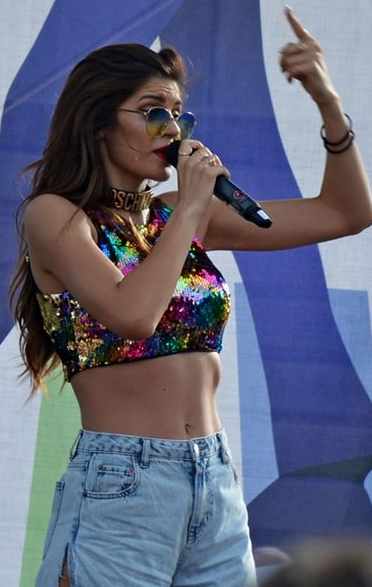
Mihaela Fileva

Kamelia

Grafa

Kamelia, Grafa and Ivan Lechev returned as coaches from the two previous seasons. They were joined by Mihaela Fileva, who replaced Poli Genova, because of her pregnancy.

Pavell & Venci Venc' also returned as hosts from the last two seasons, however there was a new V Reporter - Elina Markovska, who hosted backstage online episodes.

== Teams ==
- Winner
- Runner-up
- Third place
- Fourth place
- Eliminated in the Live shows
- Eliminated in the Knockouts
- Stolen in the Battles
- Eliminated in the Battles

Coaches	Top 48 Artists				
Ivan Lechev					
Ivan Lechev	Iva Georgieva	Nikolay Vodenicharov	Simona Simeonova	Galya Georgieva	Anton Gurov
Ivan Lechev	Todor Kovachev	Vasilena Karamanlieva	~~Sergey Vardevaryan~~	Teodor Burkhardt	Rafaela Makri
Ivan Lechev	Pirina Hristova	Boris Baichev	Trio Viva		
Mihaela Fileva					
Mihaela Fileva	Nadezhda Alexandrova	Hristian Nenov	Veniamin Dimitrov	Gergana Tsakova	Kaloyan Nikolov
Mihaela Fileva	Hristiana Randeva	Didi Reneva	Slavitsa Angelova	Mishel Yordanova	Roberto Nikolov
Mihaela Fileva	Georgi Tersiev	Nevena Aleksandrova	Slaveya Ivanova		
Kamelia					
Kamelia	Kiril Hadzhiev	Todor Simeonov	Maria Velichkova	Yana Ognianova	Georgi Peev
Kamelia	Severina Neikova	Denitsa Petrova	~~Vasilena Karamanlieva~~	Stela Gurtsidilu	Valentina Kuncheva
Kamelia	Chris McArthur	Alexandra Ivanova	Mitko Aleksiev		
Grafa					
Grafa	Atanas Kateliev	Galina Krasimirova	Ivana Mutskova	Sergey Vardevaryan	Monika Petrova
Grafa	Marta Tsvetkova	Vladelina Todorova	~~Denitsa Petrova~~	~~Didi Reneva~~	Daniel Peev
Grafa	Neli Stoinova	Niya Krusheva	Martina Petrova		
Note: Underlined names are artists who were stolen by other coach in the Battles and advanced to the Knockout Round.

== Blind Auditions ==
Each coach had only 12 spots for contestants in their respective teams. Continuing the rule from season four, if the specific contestant was rejected after not turning any of the chairs, the contestant will go out straight from the stage without any conversation by coaches. New feature in this season was the "Block" button from the fourteenth season of American version. Each coache had three new buttons with the other coaches' names which they could press to prevent one of the other coaches on getting the contestant to his team. Each coaches given one block to use.

Color Key

✔	Coach pressed "I WANT YOU" button
	Artist defaulted to a coach's team
	Artist elected a coach's team
	Artist was eliminated with no coach pressing their button
✘	Coach pressed "I WANT YOU" button, but was:
	Blocked by Ivan; Blocked by Mihaela; Blocked by Kamelia; Blocked by Grafa

=== Episode 1 (February 24, 2019) ===
Order	Artist	Song	Coach's and artist's choices			
Order	Artist	Song	Ivan	Mihaela	Kamelia	Grafa
1	Slaveya Ivanova	"Rise Up"	✔	✔	✔	✔
2	Atanas Kateliev	"Master Blaster"	✔	✔	✔	✔
3	Albena Taneva	"Camila Cabello & Trouble So Hard"	—	—	—	—
4	Todor Simeonov	"Nizam Te Ponizio"	✔	✔	✔	✔
5	Galina Krasimirova	"I Can't Stand The Rain"	✔	✔	✔	✔
6	Mihaela Mihailova	"God Is A Woman"	—	—	—	—
7	Darina Zhelyazkhova	"It's All Coming Back to Me Now"	—	—	—	—
8	Sergey Vardevaryan	"Show Me How To Live"	✔	✔	✔	✔
9	Nadezhda Alexandrova	"Wicked Game"	✔	✔	✔	✔

=== Episode 2 (March 3, 2019) ===
Order	Artist	Song	Coach's and artist's choices			
Order	Artist	Song	Ivan	Mihaela	Kamelia	Grafa
1	Daniel Peev	"Zombie"	✔	✔	✔	✔
2	Veniamin Dimitrov	"Chuzdhi Usmivki"	—	✔	✔	✔
3	Simona Simeonova	"Valerie"	✔	✔	✔	—
4	Veronika Stefanova	"Versace On The Floor"	—	—	—	—
5	Todor Kanturski	"Photograph"	—	—	—	—
6	Yana Ognianova	"Million Reasons"	✔	—	✔	—
7	Dzhulia & Magdalena	"Dve Ochi Razplakani"	—	—	—	—
8	Niya Krusheva	"Tell Me 'bout It"	✔	✔	✔	✔
9	Georgi Peev	"Are You Gonna Go My Way"	—	✔	✔	—
10	Iva Georgieva	"How Deep Is Your Love"	✔	✔	✔	✔

=== Episode 3 (March 10, 2019) ===
Order	Artist	Song	Coach's and artist's choices			
Order	Artist	Song	Ivan	Mihaela	Kamelia	Grafa
1	Trio Viva	"Wings"	✔	✘	✔	✔
2	Vadim Bezmenov	"Historia De Un Amor"	—	—	—	—
3	Marta Tsvetkova	"Don't You Remember"	—	—	—	✔
4	Galin Snezhanov	"Walk"	—	—	—	—
5	Gergana Tsakova	"IDGAF"	—	✔	✔	—
6	Nikolay Vodenicharov	"Whole Lotta Love"	✔	✔	✔	✔
7	Boyana Zhelyazkova	"Smile"	—	—	—	—
8	Valentina Kuncheva	"Bring Me To Life"	✔	—	✔	—
9	Hristian Nenov	"I Took A Pill In Ibiza"	✔	✔	✔	✔
10	Maria Velichkova	"I'd Rather Go Blind"	✔	✔	✔	✔

=== Episode 4 (March 17, 2019) ===
Order	Artist	Song	Coach's and artist's choices			
Order	Artist	Song	Ivan	Mihaela	Kamelia	Grafa
1	Neli Stoinova	"Another Love"	—	✔	—	✔
2	Pencho Tsochev	"Walk"	—	—	—	—
3	Rafaela Makri	"Feeling Good"	✔	—	✔	✔
4	Konstantin & Zora	"Tazi Vecher Az Sam Khubava"	—	—	—	—
5	Severina Neikova	"Liberian Girl"	—	—	✔	✔
6	Kaloyan Nikolov	"Castle On The Hill"	✔	✔	✔	✘
7	Vasilena Karamanlieva	"I Put A Spell On You"	—	—	✔	—
8	Vasil Stoyanov	"Blaze of Glory"	—	—	—	—
9	Francesco Febbo	"Let Me Love You"	—	—	—	—
10	Hristian Kanev	"Love Me Now"	—	—	—	—
11	Todor Kovachev	"Desire"	✔	✔	—	—
12	Ivana Mutskova	"Amar Pelos Dois"	✔	✔	✔	✔

=== Episode 5 (March 24, 2019) ===
During the episode, Ivan Lechev and Grafa performed "Fire" by Grafa.

Order	Artist	Song	Coach's and artist's choices			
Order	Artist	Song	Ivan	Mihaela	Kamelia	Grafa
1	Asya Andonova	"Igraya Stilno"	—	—	—	—
2	Mitko Aleksiev	"Thelo Na Me Nioseis"	—	✔	✔	✔
3	Mishel Yordanova	"Ghost"	—	✔	✔	—
4	Alek Kirev	"Chasing Cars"	—	—	—	—
5	Galya Georgieva	"What About Us"	✔	✔	✔	✔
6	Theodor Burkhardt	"Hero"	✔	—	—	—
7	Alexandra Kalicheva	"Nyama Takava Zhena"	—	—	—	—
8	Hristiana Randeva	"Hotline Bling"	✔	✔	✔	✔
9	Chris McArthur	"With A Little Help From My Friends"	✘	✔	✔	✔

=== Episode 6 (March 31, 2019) ===
Order	Artist	Song	Coach's and artist's choices			
Order	Artist	Song	Ivan	Mihaela	Kamelia	Grafa
1	Vladilena Todorova	"Something's Got А Hold On Me"	✔	✔	✔	✔
2	Ivan Pshenichnikov	"All Goes Wrong"	—	—	—	—
3	Denitsa Petrova	"Anywhere"	✔	✔	✔	✔
4	Milena Sitarska	"King"	—	—	—	—
5	Georgi Terziev	"Dori Da Prostish"	—	✔	—	—
6	Donna Ovcharova	"V Tvoite Ochi"	—	—	—	—
7	Stela Gurtsidilu	"People Help The People"	—	✔	✔	—
8	Maya Zafrani	"These Days"	—	—	—	—
9	Kiril Hadzhiev	"Sweet Dreams"	—	✔	✔	✔
10	Pirina Hristova	"Brala Mome Ruzha Tsvete"	✔	—	—	✔

=== Episode 7 (April 7, 2019) ===
At the end of the Blind Auditions, the coaches performed "Do Posleden Duh"

Order	Artist	Song	Coach's and artist's choices			
Order	Artist	Song	Ivan	Mihaela	Kamelia	Grafa
1	Martina Petrova	"A Song For You"	—	✔	✔	✔
2	Roberto Nikolov	"Do I Wanna Know"	—	✔	—	—
3	Gabriela Gaidadzhieva	"F-R-I-E-N-D-S"	—	—	—	—
4	Boris Baichev	"Oshte Ot Teb"	✔	✔	—	—
5	Atanaska Teneva	"Posledni Dumi"	—	—	—	—
6	Anton Gurov	"Dzhelem, Dzhelem"	✔	✔	✔	✔
7	Monika Petrova	"Your Song"	Team Full	✘	✔	✔
8	Zdravko Vasilev	"Breakin' Me"	Team Full	—	—	Team Full
9	Alexandra Ivanova	"7 Years"	Team Full	✔	✔	Team Full
10	Slavitsa Angelova	"What's Up"	Team Full	✔	Team Full	Team Full

== The Battles ==
The Battle round started on April 14, 2019. Battle advisors for the season were Stefan Valdobrev for Team Ivan, Orlin Pavlov for Team Mihaela, season 3 coach Desi Slava for Team Kamelia and Maria Ilieva for Team Grafa. The winners of this round advanced to the Knockouts. For this season, each coach had one "Steal", reducing from two from the previous seasons, to save the losing artist from another team.

Artist won the Battle and advanced to the Knockout Rounds
Artist lost the Battle but was stolen by another coach.
Artist lost the Battle and was eliminated

Episode	Coach	Order	Winner	Song	Loser	'Steal' result			
Episode	Coach	Order	Winner	Song	Loser	Ivan	Mihaela	Kamelia	Grafa
Episode 8 (April 14, 2019)	Ivan Lechev	1	Iva Georgieva	"Show Me Ho To Burlesque"	Trio Viva	—N/a	–	–	–
Episode 8 (April 14, 2019)	Mihaela Fileva	2	Hristian Nenov	"Give Me Love"	Mishel Yordanova	–	—N/a	–	–
Episode 8 (April 14, 2019)	Kamelia	3	Todor Simeonov	"Cherna Roza"	Mitko Aleksiev	–	–	—N/a	–
Episode 8 (April 14, 2019)	Ivan Lechev	4	Galya Georgieva	"This Is Me"	Rafela Makri	—N/a	–	–	–
Episode 8 (April 14, 2019)	Mihaela Fileva	5	Nadezdha Alexandrova	"Natural"	Slavitsa Angelova	-	—N/a	–	–
Episode 8 (April 14, 2019)	Grafa	6	Atanas Kateliev	"Nothing Compares To You"	Denitsa Petrova	–	–	✔	—N/a
Episode 9 (April 21, 2019)	Kamelia	1	Maria Velichkova	"Piece Of My Heart"	Chris McArthur	–	–	Team full	–
Episode 9 (April 21, 2019)	Grafa	2	Monika Petrova	"Nezavurshen Roman"	Martina Petrova	–	–	Team full	—N/a
Episode 9 (April 21, 2019)	Mihaela Fileva	3	Gergana Tsakova	"Don't Go Breaking My Heart"	Georgi Tersiev	–	—N/a	Team full	–
Episode 9 (April 21, 2019)	Grafa	4	Galina Krasimirova	"I'd Do Anything For Love"	Daniel Peev	–	–	Team full	—N/a
Episode 9 (April 21, 2019)	Kamelia	5	Severina Neikova	"Da Ne Spim"	Valentina Kuncheva	–	–	Team full	
Episode 9 (April 21, 2019)	Ivan Lechev	6	Nikolay Vodenicharov	"River"	Sergey Vardevaryan	—N/a		Team full	✔
Episode 10 (April 28, 2019)	Mihaela Fileva	1	Kaloyan Nikolov	"Hall Of Fame"	Roberto Nikolov		–	Team full	Team full
Episode 10 (April 28, 2019)	Grafa	2	Ivana Mutskova	"Forget You"	Didi Reneva	–	✔	Team full	Team full
Episode 10 (April 28, 2019)	Ivan Lechev	3	Simona Simeonova	"Like I'm Gonna Lose You"	Teodor Burkhardt	–	Team full	Team full	Team full
Episode 10 (April 28, 2019)	Kamelia	4	Yana Ognianova	"Sober"	Vasilena Karamanlieva	✔	Team full	Team full	Team full
Episode 10 (April 28, 2019)	Grafa	5	Vladilena Todorova	"Woman Like Me"	Niya Krusheva	Team full	Team full	Team full	Team full
Episode 10 (April 28, 2019)	Mihaela Fileva	6	Veniamin Dimitrov	"Ne Sega	Slaveya Ivanova	Team full	Team full	Team full	Team full
Episode 11 (May 5, 2019)	Kamelia	1	Georgi Peev	"Kids"	Alexandra Ivanova	Team full	Team full	Team full	Team full
Episode 11 (May 5, 2019)	Ivan Lechev	2	Todor Kovachev	"Iris"	Boris Baichev	Team full	Team full	Team full	Team full
Episode 11 (May 5, 2019)	Mihaela Fileva	3	Hristiana Randeva	"No Tears Left to Cry"	Nevena Aleksandrova	Team full	Team full	Team full	Team full
Episode 11 (May 5, 2019)	Grafa	4	Marta Tsvetkova	"I See Fire"	Neli Stoinova	Team full	Team full	Team full	Team full
Episode 11 (May 5, 2019)	Kamelia	5	Kiril Hadzhiev-Tino	"Wonderful Life"	Stela Gurtsilidu	Team full	Team full	Team full	Team full
Episode 11 (May 5, 2019)	Ivan Lechev	6	Anton Gurov	"Zaidi, Zaidi"	Pirina Hristova	Team full	Team full	Team full	Team full

== Knockouts ==
The Knockouts round replaced the "Super Battles" from the two previous seasons. The contestants of each team fight to be seated on one of three red chairs by their coach. After performing the song, the coach will decide either the contestant will go straight forward to the next phase by giving him/her a chair or will be eliminated.

If the coach decided to give a chair to the contestant, the contestants in the next seats would move to the next one and the contestant who moved from the last chair would be eliminated.. Artists who ends up sitting on the chairs at the end of the round will move forward to the Live Shows.

Artist given a chair and advanced to the Live Shows
Artist was given a chair but later eliminated in favor of another artist
Artist was eliminated automatically by not giving chair

Episode	Coach	Order	Artist	Song	Chair given	Artist removed	Final result	Chair #1	Chair #2	Chair #3
Episode 12 (May 12, 2019)	Mihaela Fileva	1	Kaloyan Nikolov	"Vrag"	1	–	Eliminated	Kaloyan Nikolov	—	—
Episode 12 (May 12, 2019)	Mihaela Fileva	2	Hristiana Randeva	"Without Me"	Not Given	–	Eliminated	Kaloyan Nikolov	—	—
Episode 12 (May 12, 2019)	Mihaela Fileva	3	Didi Reneva	"Highway To Hell"	2	–	Eliminated	Kaloyan Nikolov	Didi Reneva	—
Episode 12 (May 12, 2019)	Mihaela Fileva	4	Hristian Nenov	"Be Alright"	1	–	Advanced	Hristian Nenov	Kaloyan Nikolov	Didi Reneva
Episode 12 (May 12, 2019)	Mihaela Fileva	5	Gergana Tsakova	"Torn"	Not Given	–	Eliminated	Hristian Nenov	Kaloyan Nikolov	Didi Reneva
Episode 12 (May 12, 2019)	Mihaela Fileva	6	Veniamin Dimitrov	"In My Blood"	2	Didi Reneva	Advanced	Hristian Nenov	Veniamin Dimitrov	Kaloyan Nikolov
Episode 12 (May 12, 2019)	Mihaela Fileva	7	Nadezhda Alexandrova	"Skyfall"	3	Kaloyan Nikolov	Advanced	Hristian Nenov	Veniamin Dimitrov	Nadezhda Alexandrova
Episode 12 (May 12, 2019)	Ivan Lechev	1	Galya Georgieva	"I Wanna Dance With Somebody"	1	–	Eliminated	Galya Georgieva	—	—
Episode 12 (May 12, 2019)	Ivan Lechev	2	Anton Gurov	"Ne Kazvai Luybe Leka Nosht"	2	–	Eliminated	Galya Georgieva	Anton Gurov	—
Episode 12 (May 12, 2019)	Ivan Lechev	3	Todor Kovachev	"Heathens"	1	–	Eliminated	Todor Kovachev	Galya Georgieva	Anton Gurov
Episode 12 (May 12, 2019)	Ivan Lechev	4	Vasilena Karamanlieva	"Proshepnati Mechti"	Not Given	–	Eliminated	Todor Kovachev	Galya Georgieva	Anton Gurov
Episode 12 (May 12, 2019)	Ivan Lechev	5	Simona Simeonova	"Do It Like A Dude"	1	Anton Gurov	Advanced	Simona Simeonova	Todor Kovachev	Galya Georgieva
Episode 12 (May 12, 2019)	Ivan Lechev	6	Nikolay Vodenicharov	"Born To Be Wild"	1	Galya Georgieva	Advanced	Nikolay Vodenicharov	Simona Simeonova	Todor Kovachev
Episode 12 (May 12, 2019)	Ivan Lechev	7	Iva Georgieva	"Purple Rain"	1	Todor Kovachev	Advanced	Iva Georgieva	Nikolay Vodenicharov	Simona Simeonova
Episode 13 (May 19, 2019)	Grafa	1	Monika Petrova	"The Way You Make Me Feel"	1	–	Eliminated	Monika Petrova	—	—
Episode 13 (May 19, 2019)	Grafa	2	Sergey Vardevaryan	"Man In The Box"	1	–	Eliminated	Sergey Vardevaryan	Monika Petrova	—
Episode 13 (May 19, 2019)	Grafa	3	Marta Tsvetkova	"We Found Love"	3	–	Eliminated	Sergey Vardevaryan	Monika Petrova	Marta Tsvetkova
Episode 13 (May 19, 2019)	Grafa	4	Galina Krasimirova	"At Last"	1	Marta Tsvetkova	Advanced	Galina Krasimirova	Sergey Vardevaryan	Monika Petrova
Episode 13 (May 19, 2019)	Grafa	5	Vladilena Todorova	"Fighter"	Not Given	–	Eliminated	Galina Krasimirova	Sergey Vardevaryan	Monika Petrova
Episode 13 (May 19, 2019)	Grafa	6	Ivana Mutskova	"Bella"	2	Monika Petrova	Advanced	Galina Krasimirova	Ivana Mutskova	Sergey Vardevaryan
Episode 13 (May 19, 2019)	Grafa	7	Atanas Kateliev	"Dance Little Sister"	2	Sergey Vardevaryan	Advanced	Galina Krasimirova	Atanas Kateliev	Ivana Mutskova
Episode 13 (May 19, 2019)	Kamelia	1	Georgi Peev	"Whatever It Takes"	1	–	Eliminated	Georgi Peev	—	—
Episode 13 (May 19, 2019)	Kamelia	2	Yana Ognianova	"Shallow"	2	–	Eliminated	Georgi Peev	Yana Ognianova	—
Episode 13 (May 19, 2019)	Kamelia	3	Todor Simeonov	"Zapisano Je U Vremenu "	1	–	Advanced	Todor Simeonov	Georgi Peev	Yana Ognianova
Episode 13 (May 19, 2019)	Kamelia	4	Maria Velichkova	"Steamy Windows"	1	Yana Ognianova	Advanced	Maria Velichkova	Todor Simeonov	Georgi Peev
Episode 13 (May 19, 2019)	Kamelia	5	Severina Neikova	"One Kiss"	Not Given	–	Eliminated	Maria Velichkova	Todor Simeonov	Georgi Peev
Episode 13 (May 19, 2019)	Kamelia	6	Kiril Hadzhiev-Tino	"Personal Jesus"	3	Georgi Peev	Advanced	Maria Velichkova	Todor Simeonov	Kiril Hadzhiev-Tino
Episode 13 (May 19, 2019)	Kamelia	7	Denitsa Petrova	"Say You Love Me"	Not Given	–	Eliminated	Maria Velichkova	Todor Simeonov	Kiril Hadzhiev-Tino

== Live Shows (Live Concerts) ==
Color key

Artist was saved and advanced to the next live show from the public's vote
Artist was eliminated

=== Week 1: Quarter-final ===
Episode	Coach	Order	Artist	Song	Result
Episode 14 May 25, 2019	Ivan Lechev	1	Iva Georgieva	"Tears"	Advanced
Episode 14 May 25, 2019	Mihaela Fileva	2	Veniamin Dimitrov	"Tvoi"	Eliminated
Episode 14 May 25, 2019	Grafa	3	Galina Krasimirova	"Mercy"	Advanced
Episode 14 May 25, 2019	Kamelia	4	Todor Simeonov	"Svetat E Za Dvama"	Eliminated
Episode 14 May 25, 2019	Ivan Lechev	5	Nikolay Vodenicharov	"Are You Gonna Be My Girl"	Advanced
Episode 14 May 25, 2019	Mihaela Fileva	6	Hristian Nenov	"Let It Go"	Advanced
Episode 14 May 25, 2019	Kamelia	7	Maria Velichkova	"Ironic"	Advanced
Episode 14 May 25, 2019	Grafa	8	Ivana Mutskova	"Always Remember Us This Way"	Eliminated
Episode 14 May 25, 2019	Kamelia	9	Kiril Hadzhiev-Tino	"Luda Po Tebe"	Advanced
Episode 14 May 25, 2019	Grafa	10	Atanas Kateliev	"If I Ain't Got You"	Advanced
Episode 14 May 25, 2019	Ivan Lechev	11	Simona Simeonova	"Moeto Radio"	Eliminated
Episode 14 May 25, 2019	Mihaela Fileva	12	Nadezhda Alexandrova	"Make It Rain"	Advanced

=== Week 2: Semi-final ===
Episode	Coach	Order	Artist	Song	Result
Episode 15 (June 1, 2019)	Kamelia	1	Maria Velichkova	"Think"	Eliminated
Episode 15 (June 1, 2019)	Ivan Lechev	2	Nikolay Vodenicharov	"Sail"	Eliminated
Episode 15 (June 1, 2019)	Grafa	3	Galina Krasimirova	"Skin"	Eliminated
Episode 15 (June 1, 2019)	Mihaela Fileva	4	Hristian Nenov	"Oshte Malko"	Eliminated
Episode 15 (June 1, 2019)	Ivan Lechev	5	Iva Georgieva	"Call Out My Name"	Advanced
Episode 15 (June 1, 2019)	Kamelia	6	Kiril Hadzhiev-Tino	"I Kissed A Girl"	Advanced
Episode 15 (June 1, 2019)	Mihaela Fileva	7	Nadezhda Alexandrova	"Runnin'"	Advanced
Episode 15 (June 1, 2019)	Grafa	8	Atanas Kateliev	"Moy Svyat"	Advanced

==== Duel Performances ====
Order	Coach	Artists	Song
1	Kamelia	Maria Velichkova & Kiril Hadzhiev-Tino	"These Boots Are Made For Walkin'"
2	Ivan Lechev	Nikolay Vodenicharov & Iva Georgieva	"Crazy"
3	Mihaela Fileva	Hristian Nenov & Nadezhda Alexandrova	"Rewrite The Stars"
4	Grafa	Galina Krasimirova & Atanas Kateliev	"Broken Strings"

=== Week 3 : Final (June 9) ===
Color key

Artist proclaimed as the winner
Artist ended as the runner-up
Artist ended as the third placer
Artist ended as the fourth placer
Artist advanced to the second round

==== Round 1 ====
Coach	Artist	Blind Auditions Song		Duet with Coach/Guest		Votes	Result
Coach	Artist	Order	Song	Song	With	Votes	Result
Ivan Lechev	Iva Georgieva	1	"How Deep Is Your Love"	"Chain Of Fools"	Nia Petrova & Ivan Lechev		Third place
Kamelia	Kiril Hadzhiev-Tino	2	"Sweet Dreams"	"Enjoy The Silence"	Viktoria Dinkova	Advanced	N/A
Grafa	Atanas Kateliev	3	"Master Blaster"	"Domino"	Grafa	Advanced	N/A
Mihaela Fileva	Nadezhda Alexandrova	4	"Wicked Game"	"I Az Sam Tuk"	Mihaela Fileva		Fourth place

==== Round 2 ====
The round 2 of the Finals show will determine the winner of the season.

Coach	Artist	Order	Song	Votes	Result
Kamelia	Kiril Hadzhiev-Tino	1	"Can't Help Falling In Love"	32.0%	Runner-up
Grafa	Atanas Kateliev	2	"Impossible"	68.0%	Winner

== Elimination Chart ==
Color key
Artist's info

- Artist from Team Lechev
- Artist from Team Mihaela
- Artist from Team Kamelia
- Artist from Team Grafa

Result details

- Winner
- Runner-up
- Third place
- Fourth place
- Saved by the public
- Eliminated

Artist	Week 1 Quarter-final	Week 2 Semi-final	Week 3 Final
Atanas Kateliev	Safe	Safe	Winner
Kiril Hadzhiev-Tino	Safe	Safe	Runner-up
Iva Georgieva	Safe	Safe	Third place
Nadezhda Alexandrova	Safe	Safe	Fourth place
Maria Velichkova	Safe	Eliminated	Eliminated (Week 2)
Nikolay Vodenicharov	Safe	Eliminated	Eliminated (Week 2)
Galina Krasimirova	Safe	Eliminated	Eliminated (Week 2)
Hristian Nenov	Safe	Eliminated	Eliminated (Week 2)
Veniamin Dimitrov	Eliminated	Eliminated (Week 1)	
Todor Simeonov	Eliminated	Eliminated (Week 1)	
Ivana Mutskova	Eliminated	Eliminated (Week 1)	
Simona Simeonova	Eliminated	Eliminated (Week 1)	

=== Per team ===
Artist	Week 1 Quarter-final	Week 2 Semi-final	Week 3 Final
Iva Georgieva	Safe	Safe	Third place
Nikolay Vodenicharov	Safe	Eliminated	
Simona Simeonova	Eliminated		
Nadezhda Alexandrova	Safe	Safe	Fourth place
Hristian Nenov	Safe	Eliminated	
Veniamin Dimitrov	Eliminated		
Kiril Hadzhiev-Tino	Safe	Safe	Runner-up
Maria Velichkova	Safe	Eliminated	
Todor Simeonov	Eliminated		
Atanas Kateliev	Safe	Safe	Winner
Galina Krasimirova	Safe	Eliminated	
Ivana Mutskova	Eliminated		
