= Camelia (name) =

Camelia is a Romanian feminine given name. Notable persons with that name include:

- Camelia (actress) (1929–1950), Egyptian actress
- Camelia Diaconescu (born 1963), Romanian rower
- Camelia Frieberg (born 1959), Canadian film director and producer
- Camelia Hotea (born 1984), Romanian handballer
- Camelia Macoviciuc-Mihalcea (born 1968), Romanian rower
- Camelia Potec (born 1982), Romanian swimmer
- Camelia Voinea (born 1970), Romanian artistic gymnast
- Camélia Jordana (born 1992), French Singer
- Camelia Malik (born 1955), Indonesian Singer
- Kamelia Petrova (born 2006), Bulgarian rhythmic gymnast
- Camelia Somers (born 1995), American Actress
- Dayang Noor Camelia Abang Khalid (born 1974), known by her stage name Camelia, Malaysian Singer
