= 957 Camelia =

Main-belt asteroid

Discovery
- Discovered by: K. Reinmuth
- Discovery site: Heidelberg Obs.
- Discovery date: 7 September 1921

Designations
- Pronunciation: /kəˈmiːliə/
- Named after: Camellia (genus of flowers)
- Alternative designations: A921 RF · 1932 AG; 1958 BM · 1921 JX
- Minor planet category: main-belt · (outer) background · slow (Note: Revised lightcurve plot of 957 Camelia, Palmer Divide Observatory, B. D. Warner (2000, 2010) rotation period 150±10 hours with a brightness amplitude of 0.30 mag. Quality code of 1+. Summary figures at the LCDB)

Orbital characteristics
- Epoch 31 May 2020 (JD 2459000.5)
- Uncertainty parameter 0
- Observation arc: 97.94 yr (35,773 d)
- Aphelion: 3.1595 AU
- Perihelion: 2.6884 AU
- Semi-major axis: 2.9240 AU
- Eccentricity: 0.0806
- Orbital period (sidereal): 5.00 yr (1,826 d)
- Mean anomaly: 199.16°
- Mean motion: 0° 11^{m} 49.56^{s} / day
- Inclination: 14.761°
- Longitude of ascending node: 232.78°
- Argument of perihelion: 224.57°

Physical characteristics
- Mean diameter: 64.36±1.01 km; 73.73±1.5 km; 91.548±0.450 km
- Mass: (1.29±0.64)×10^{18} kg (Note: Calculated from its standard gravitational parameter GM = 0.086±0.043 km^{3}/s^{2}.)
- Mean density: 3.21 g/cm^{3} (Note: Assuming a diameter of 91.5 km.)
- Synodic rotation period: 150±10 h
- Geometric albedo: 0.025±0.004; 0.0429±0.002; 0.056±0.002
- Spectral type: C (S3OS2-TH); Cb (S3OS2-BB)
- Absolute magnitude (H): 9.9

957 Camelia /kəˈmiːliə/ is a large, carbonaceous background asteroid and slow rotator, approximately 70 kilometers (43 miles) in diameter. It is located in the outer regions of the asteroid belt and was discovered on 7 September 1921, by astronomer Karl Reinmuth at the Heidelberg-Königstuhl State Observatory in Germany and given the provisional designations A921 RF and 1921 JX. The C-type asteroid (Cb) has a long rotation period of at least 150 hours. It was named after the genus of flowering plants, Camellia.

== Orbit and classification ==
Camelia is a non-family asteroid of the main belt's background population when applying the hierarchical clustering method to its proper orbital elements. It orbits the Sun in the outer asteroid belt at a distance of 2.7–3.2 AU once every 5 years (1,826 days; semi-major axis of 2.92 AU). Its orbit has an eccentricity of 0.08 and an inclination of 15° with respect to the ecliptic. The body's observation arc begins at Heidelberg Observatory on 4 October 1926, five years after its official discovery observation.

== Naming ==
This minor planet was named after the genus of Asian shrubs and trees, Petunia. This genus of flowering plants belongs to the Theaceae (tea family). The prominent ornamental greenhouse shrubs show glossy evergreen leaves and roselike flowers. The naming was mentioned in The Names of the Minor Planets by Paul Herget in 1955 (H 92). Only a minority of minor planets are named after plants.

=== Reinmuth's flowers ===
Due to his many discoveries, Karl Reinmuth submitted a large list of 66 newly named asteroids in the early 1930s. The list covered his discoveries with numbers between (1009) and (1200). This list also contained a sequence of 28 asteroids, starting with this asteroid, that were all named after plants, in particular flowering plants (also see list of minor planets named after animals and plants).

== Physical characteristics ==
In the Tholen-like taxonomy of the Small Solar System Objects Spectroscopic Survey (S3OS2), Camelia is a carbonaceous C-type asteroid, while in the SMASS-like taxonomy of the S3OS2, it is a Cb-subtype that transitions from the C-type to the "brighter" B-type asteroids.

=== Rotation period ===
In August 2000, a rotational lightcurve of Camelia was obtained from photometric observations by Brian Warner at the Palmer Divide Observatory (716) in Colorado. The originally published lightcurve analysis gave a wrong rotation period of 5.391±0.02 hours with a brightness variation of 0.32±0.02 magnitude (U=0). In July 2010, and with the availability of improved analysis tools and techniques along with the experience gained over more than a decade, Warner reviewed and recalibrated the original data set and determined a period of at least 150±10 hours with an amplitude of more than 0.30 (U=1+). With such a long period, Camelia is a slow rotator. While the slowest rotators have periods above 1000 hours, the vast majority of asteroids have a much shorter rotation period of 2.2 to 20 hours.

=== Diameter and albedo ===
According to the surveys carried out by the Japanese Akari satellite, the Infrared Astronomical Satellite IRAS, and the NEOWISE mission of NASA's Wide-field Infrared Survey Explorer (WISE), Camelia measures (64.36±1.01), (73.73±1.5) and (91.548±0.450) kilometers in diameter, and its surface has an albedo of (0.056±0.002), (0.0429±0.002) and (0.025±0.004), respectively. The Collaborative Asteroid Lightcurve Link derives an albedo of 0.0357 and a diameter of 73.63 km based on an absolute magnitude of 10.71.

Over the course of a few years, the WISE team has also published several smaller mean-diameters of (57.808±23.443 km), (60.832±20.524 km) and (66.460±0.577 km) with corresponding albedos of (0.044±0.040), (0.043±0.029) and (0.053±0.007).
