= USS Camelia =

Gunboat of the United States Navy

History

United States
- Ordered: as Governor
- Laid down: date unknown
- Launched: 1862 at New York City
- Acquired: 17 September 1863
- Commissioned: 28 November 1863
- Decommissioned: 1865 at New York City
- Stricken: 1865 (est.)
- Fate: Sold, 15 August 1865

General characteristics
- Displacement: 198 tons
- Length: 111 ft (34 m)
- Beam: 19 ft 6 in (5.94 m)
- Draught: 10 ft 6 in (3.20 m)
- Propulsion: steam engine; screw propelled
- Speed: 10 knots
- Complement: 40
- Armament: two 20-pounder rifled guns

USS Camelia was a steamer acquired by the Union Navy during the American Civil War. She was armed as a gunboat by the Navy and assigned to patrol navigable waterways of the Confederacy to prevent the South from trading with other countries.

== Built in New York City in 1862 ==
Camelia, a screw tugboat, was built in 1862 at New York City as Governor; purchased there 17 September 1863; and commissioned 28 November 1863 with Acting Ensign R. W. Parker assuming command the next day.

== Civil War service ==
From 21 January 1864 to 1 July 1865, Camelia served with the South Atlantic Blockading Squadron off Charleston, South Carolina, and at Port Royal, South Carolina.

In addition to playing a part in the blockade which kept critically needed war materials and civilian commodities from entering the Confederacy, Camelia contributed officers and men to the naval brigade which carried out successful operations ashore in the Broad River area of South Carolina in November and December 1864.

== Post-war decommissioning and sale ==
Returning to New York City, the tug was sold there 15 August 1865.

== See also ==
- Confederate States Navy
