= Camelia (singer) =

Malaysian singer and model

Yang Berbahagia Datin Seri Camelia
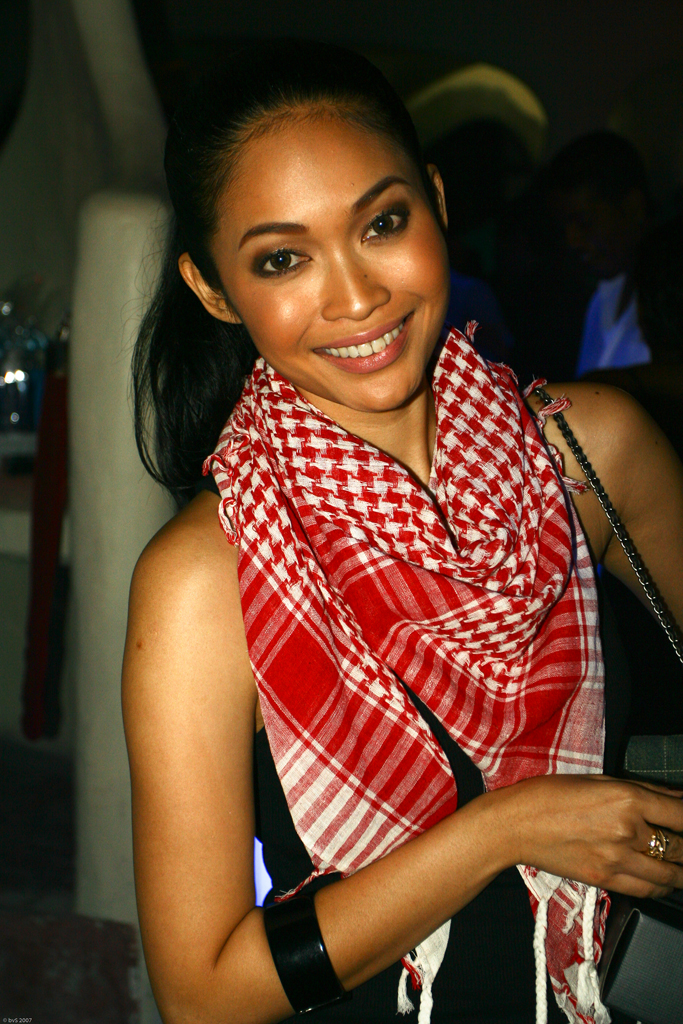

Background information
- Born: Dayang Nur Camelia binti Abang Khalid; 20 June 1974 (age 51); Kuching, Sarawak, Malaysia
- Genres: Pop
- Occupations: Singer, songwriter, model
- Instrument: Vocals
- Years active: 1997–2007
- Spouses: Mohd Ehsan Tun Ahmad Zaidi Adruce (div. 1999) Datuk Seri Akhbar Khan (m. 2010)
- Website: Camelia.com.my

Datin Seri Dayang Nur Camelia binti Tan Sri Abang Khalid (born 20 June 1974) also known as Camelia is a Malaysian singer and model. She was the first Malaysian to be signed to Universal Music. Her first album, Camelia, won the Best New Artist and Best Vocal Performance in an Album awards from Anugerah Industri Muzik (AIM).

From 2003, she was the Malaysian spokesmodel for L'Oréal. She has also been the spokesmodel for TAG Heuer, Wacoal, Epson, Pantene and Omega.

== Discography ==
=== Albums ===
Camelia (1997)
No.	Title	Length
1.	"Dengarlah Kasih"
2.	"Kini Berakhir"
3.	"Kau Teristimewa"
4.	"Erti Kehidupan"
5.	"Menuju Usia"
6.	"Khas Buatmu"
7.	"Bersama"
8.	"Kau Di Hatiku"
9.	"Hari Bahagia"
10.	"Rindu Padanya"

I, II, III (1998)
No.	Title	Length
1.	"Satu Dua Tiga Empat Lima"
2.	"Tanpa Cintamu"
3.	"Permata Hatiku"
4.	"Milikku Jua"
5.	"Hatiku"
6.	"Without you"

Memori (1999)
No.	Title	Length
1.	"Insan Di Kota"
2.	"Akhirnya"
3.	"Memori"
4.	"Hidupku Masih Bererti"
5.	"Suratan Atau Kebetulan"
6.	"Janjiku"
7.	"Di Sisimu"
8.	"Siapakah"
9.	"Pisah"
10.	"Ku Izinkan Kasih"
11.	"Erti Kehidupan (Sho Nuff Mix)"

Mimpi (2001)
No.	Title	Length
1.	"Erti Kehidupan"
2.	"Bawa Cinta"
3.	"Sucikanlah"
4.	"Duniaku"
5.	"Bersamamu"
6.	"Mimpi"
7.	"Bukan Yang Terbaik"
8.	"Angan Dan Harapan"
9.	"Feel Me"
10.	"Terlanjur Sayang"

Untukmu (2003)
No.	Title	Length
1.	"Kini Bebas (duet Anuar Zain)"
2.	"Dugaan Merindu"
3.	"Rindu Padanya"
4.	"Dengarlah Kasih"
5.	"Akhirnya"
6.	"Pisah"
7.	"Bersama"
8.	"Duniaku"
9.	"Hanya Ilusi"
10.	"Memori"
11.	"Terlanjur Sayang"
12.	"Di Sisimu"
13.	"Menuju Usia"
14.	"Bersamamu"
15.	"What You Want"
16.	"Not That Type of Lady"
17.	"Siapakah"

Mysticam (2007)
No.	Title	Length
1.	"Hypnosis"
2.	"Jari Jemari feat Tony"
3.	"Puteri Santubong feat Arafah"
4.	"Du Du Du"
5.	"Kool"
6.	"Seiring Sejalan feat Joe Filizzow"
7.	"Cong"
8.	"Closer"
9.	"Feel Me"
10.	"Jari Jemari Clubmix"
11.	"Seiring Sejalan Clubmix"

== TV program ==
- Casa Impian (Astro Ria; 1998 - 2006)

== Awards ==
- Anugerah Industri Muzik (AIM) 1998
  - Best New Artist
  - Best Vocal Performance in an Album for "Camelia"

== Personal life ==
She was married to Mohd Ehsan Tun Ahmad Zaidi Adruce until their divorce in 1999. She then married prominent local developer Datuk Seri Akhbar Khan and gained a daughter, Aisha Asmara Khan, through her second marriage in 2010.
