= USLHT Camellia =

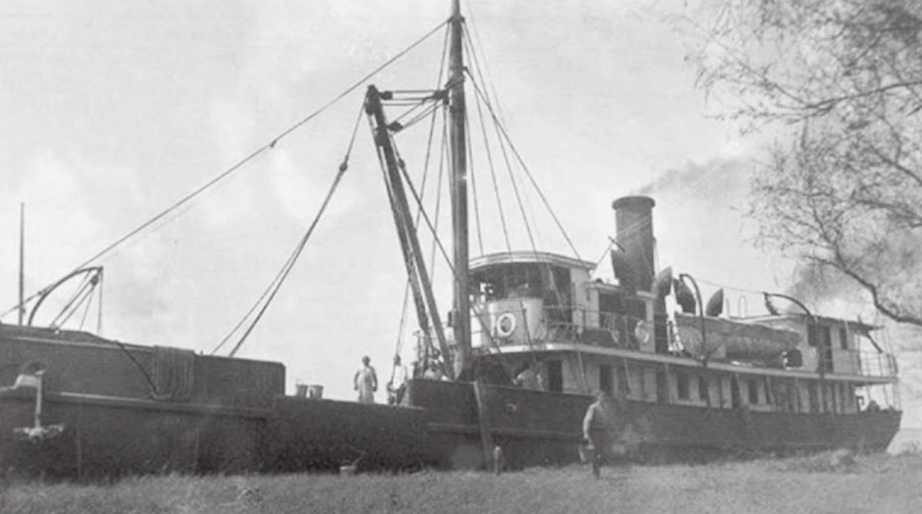
- USLHT Camellia unloading supplies at Cape St. George Light on St. George Island on the Gulf coast of Florida.

History

United States Lighthouse Service
- Name: USLHT Camellia
- Namesake: Camellia, a genus of flowering plants in the family Theaceae
- Builder: Racine Boat Manufacturing Company, Muskegon, Michigan
- Completed: 1911
- Commissioned: 13 July 1911
- Fate: Transferred to U.S. Army 11 April 1917
- Acquired: 1 July 1919 (from U.S. Navy)
- Fate: Transferred to U.S. Coast Guard 1 July 1939

History

United States Army
- Name: Camellia
- Namesake: Previous name retained
- Acquired: 11 April 1917 (from U.S. Lighthouse Service)
- Fate: Transferred to U.S. Navy 1 July 1917

History

United States Navy
- Name: USS Camellia
- Namesake: Previous name retained
- Acquired: 1 July 1917 (from U.S. Army)
- Fate: Transferred to U.S. Lighthouse Service 1 July 1919

History

United States Coast Guard
- Name: USCGC Cedar (WAGL-207)
- Namesake: Previous name retained
- Acquired: 1 July 1939 (from U.S. Lighthouse Service)
- Decommissioned: 18 August 1947
- Reclassified: WAGL-206 in 1942
- Fate: Transferred to the Dominican Republic 1949

History

Dominican Republic
- Name: Capotillo (FB 101)
- Acquired: 1949
- Reclassified: Service Craft No. 1
- Fate: Extant 1980s

General characteristics
- Type: Lighthouse tender
- Displacement: 377 long tons (383 t); 1919: 276 long tons (280 t)
- Length: 116 ft 7 in (35.5 m) (overall); 106 ft (32.3 m) (between perpendiculars)
- Beam: 24 ft 6 in (7.5 m)
- Draft: 10 ft (3.0 m)
- Propulsion: As built: Two Almy-type water-tube boilers, two 280-ihp (237-kW) triple-expansion inverted direct-acting steam engines, one shaft; 1933: Two Atlas-Imperial diesel engines
- Speed: 9 knots
- Complement: 16; 1919: 21

USLHT Camellia was a lighthouse tender in commission in the fleet of the United States Lighthouse Service from 1911 to 1917 and from 1919 to 1939, and – as USCGC Camellia (WAGL-206) – in the fleet of the United States Coast Guard from 1939 to 1947. During World War I she briefly saw war service with the United States Army in 1917 before serving as the United States Navy patrol vessel USS Camellia from 1917 to 1919. She also saw service in World War II under U.S. Navy control while in the Coast Guard fleet. After the conclusion of her United States Government career, she operated for decades in the service of the Dominican Navy as Capotillo (FB 101).

== Construction and commissioning ==
Camellia was constructed in 1911 by the Racine Boat Manufacturing Company in Muskegon, Michigan, for the United States Lighthouse Service. She was commissioned into service in the Lighthouse Service's fleet as USLHT Camellia on 13 July 1911.

== Service history ==
=== 1911–1917 ===
Early in her career, Camellia operated in the Eighth Lighthouse District along the United States Gulf Coast. Her home port was at New Orleans, Louisiana.

=== World War I ===
The United States entered World War I on 6 April 1917, and by executive order Camellia was among a number of lighthouse tenders the Lighthouse Service transferred to the United States Department of War on 11 April 1917 for United States Army service on coastal defense duties. Among other things, the lighthouse tenders deployed submarine nets to defend harbors and those outfitted with mine-planting gear – as Camellia had been even before the declaration of war – also placed controlled minefields to protect harbors from penetration by enemy vessels.

On 1 July 1917, the U.S. Department of War transferred Camellia to the United States Department of the Navy for United States Navy wartime service. Commissioned into Navy service as USS Camellia, she operated as a patrol vessel in the Eighth Naval District along the U.S. Gulf Coast through the end of the war on 11 November 1918 and during its immediate aftermath. The Navy transferred her back to the Lighthouse Service on 1 July 1919.

=== 1919–1941 ===
As USLHT Camellia, the ship returned to lighthouse tender duty. In 1933, her original steam engines were replaced by Atlas-Imperial diesel engines.

On 1 July 1939, the U.S. Lighthouse Service was abolished and the United States Coast Guard took over its responsibilities and assets, and Camellia thus became part of the Coast Guard fleet as USCGC Camellia.

=== World War II ===
On 1 November 1941, with World War II raging in Europe, North Africa, and the Middle East, the U.S. Coast Guard was transferred to the control of the U.S. Navy under Executive Order 8929, and Camellia thus again came under U.S. Navy control only weeks before the United States entered the war on 7 December 1941. She was assigned the hull classification symbol WAGL-206 in 1942.

=== Post-World War II ===
Returned to U.S. Coast Guard control after the conclusion of World War II, Camellia was decommissioned on 29 December 1947.

=== Dominican Republic ===
The United States Government transferred the ship to the Dominican Republic in 1949. In Dominican Navy service, she was renamed Capotillo (FB 101) and reclassified as "Service Craft No. 1." She was still in service in the 1980s, but her subsequent fate is unknown.
