= Kamelia =

Kamelia Камелия
- Born: Kamelia Vladimirova Veskova; 10 January 1971 (age 55); Chiprovtsi, Bulgaria
- Genres: Folk Pop; Dance Pop; Pop
- Instrument: Mezzo-soprano voice
- Years active: 1997–present
- Labels: Payner; Kams Production
- Website: www.kamelia-online.com

Kameliya Vladimirova Veskova (Bulgarian: Камелия Владимирова Вескова; born 10 January 1971), known mononymously as Kamelia, is a Bulgarian singer, actress and TV presenter.

== Early years ==
Kamelia was born on 10 January 1971 in the town of Chiprovtsi. Her musical debut was at the age of eleven, as a soloist in the school choir with which she performed a Russian song. She appeared in public for the first time, becoming the winner of the Miss Chiprovtsi and Miss Montana beauty pageants organized around that time.

At the same time, Kamelia took her first steps as a singer. She started singing at weddings and baptisms in Northwestern Bulgaria as a soloist in a band led by Plamen Velinov. In the spring of 1996, Kamelia was noticed by the conductor of the Vidin Orchestra, Veni Petkov, and became part of the orchestra.

== Musical career ==
=== 1997–1999 ===
Kamelia was seriously involved in singing from the start of 1997. In August of that year, she signed a contract with the music company Payner in Dimitrovgrad. Her popularity was growing significantly, and performances in clubs and discothèques were becoming an integral part of her daily life.

In 1998, preparation for her debut album was completed and, in September, the album Огън момиче was released on the music market. She made videos for the songs "Огън момиче", "Грях ли е това", "Няма да те моля", "Разбери ме, мили", "Само тази нощ" and "Защо повярвах". The hit "Защо повярвах" from the album was a great success. The song was declared #1 by Payner and New Folk magazine in 1999. The album Огън момиче reached a circulation of 90,000 copies. These professional successes motivated Kamelia to make an even better album. On 7 December 1999, the album Златна рибка appeared on the music market. The first song was "Няма шега", better known as "Ya habibi". The song occupied the top places in all charts. The album sold in record numbers.

=== 2000–2004 ===
At the beginning of 2000, videos promoted some of the biggest hits of her career, "Луда по тебе" and "Ти си" (the first black-and-white video in pop-folk). On her birthday, the singer was promoting her latest album, Златна рибка, which took place in the Prikazkite complex near Harmanli. In April 2000, Payner and the Bulgarian Association of Music Producers (BAMP) certified Златна рибка gold for sales. Its total circulation reached 200,000 copies. 30,000 of them are on CD and this makes it the best-selling for the year in the country, and at the end of the year, it even reached platinum circulation.

Kamelia recorded the song "Къде си ти", which appeared on the music market in the summer of 2001 and became a hit. It was also the first music video to be broadcast on Planeta TV. At the end of the year, she also participated in the 3-year-old Mustang festival in Varna. She won three awards for "Къде си ти". The singer also presented herself in the competition for a singer with the first recorded song for her upcoming album: the ballad "Няма те".

On 21 April 2002, Kamelia's third album, Нещо горещо, was massively promoted by Payner. The album has a record speed of sales: in the first week alone more than 10,000 copies sold. The success of the album's first hit was overshadowed by another song; "Залеза и зората" came out as a second song from Нещо горещо. The hit became a folk emblem for 2002, remaining for a long time atop all music charts. Kamelia said, "I'm really proud of 'Залеза и зората' because this song turned out to be the biggest hit of the year." The album's third hit was the duet ballad "Искаш да се върна", in which Kamelia sings in Greek with Greek singer Sakis Coucos. "Искаш да се върна" stayed in first place in the viewers' chart of Planeta TV for six weeks. While filming the video for the song in Thessaloniki, a Greek TV journalist called Kamelia the "Bulgarian Anna Vissi". On 17 November, Kamelia sang in the Oval Hall, London. She turned out to be the most popular singer in a survey conducted among Bulgarian emigrants in the British capital. So many people wanted to see Kamelia live that about 400 people remained outside the hall. 2002 was the most successful in Kamelia's career. In it end, it was clear that Нещо горещо was the best-selling music product in Bulgaria for the year, regardless of style or company.

On 14 February 2004, the album Презареждане appeared on the music market. On 10 February, Kamelia was a guest on a Planeta TV show, where she appeared with her red hair. There, she repeatedly hinted that she had participated in a swimsuit photoshoot for Playboy and thus reinforced rumours that she would appear in the next issue of the magazine. For the first time in Bulgaria, a national tour with the participation of pop-folk performers has been launched.

=== 2005–2012 ===
On 29 June 2005, after a long wait, Kamelia's fourth solo album Има любов was released. It includes the folk song "Три години". Advertising for the album started on the day of its release. Short excerpts from the songs "Като жива рана", "Има любов", "Луд купон да завъртим" and "Ти ела" indicated the potential of the songs on the album. The lead single was "Ти ела". At the beginning of the summer, the video for the song "В сърцето си ми ти" appeared. Following this was a video for "Има любов", which appeared on Planeta TV on 19 January 2006.

In February 2007, Kamelia recorded the song and video "Забранена зона". At the annual awards of Planeta TV in February, she appeared in a dress in the colors of the Bulgarian tricolor. In August, the singer presented the video "Още те обичам" and starred in a TV commercial for Polar Bear vodka. At the end of 2007, she traveled to the United States where she toured for two months, mostly in cities with a large concentration of Bulgarian immigrants.

In the summer of 2008, Kamelia was part of the fifth national tour Planeta Derby 2008, and in September she became the first Bulgarian artist with a virtual album, created by her fans. At the beginning of October, the video for the song "Фалшива кожа" was aired on Planeta TV. She marked the end of 2008 with a music tour in Macedonia, where she made several club appearances.

In February 2009, the video for the song "Orgasm" was shot. Shortly thereafter she received an offer to become the host of fun-humor show Голямата уста, on Nova TV which is similar to the reality TV show Big Brother. On 23 June 2009, Planeta TV promoted Kamelia's video for the song "Черна кръв", and on 30 October promoted the video for the song "Оставяш петна".

In early February 2010, Kamelia made the video for the song "Как да те забравя". In early August 2010, Slava magazine named Kamelia the sexiest Bulgarian star in its poll. There followed a video for the song "Sexy", a sort of sequel to "Orgasm". On 28 September of the same year, the song "Изпий ме цялата" was released. In October, the singer took part in BNT's Christmas campaign in support of the children of the killed police officers, where she is the face of the campaign along with TV presenters Spas Kyosev, Tsvetanka Rizova and Konstantin Lungov, as well as an actor Vladimir Karamazov.

In early 2011 the video for the song "Erotica" was broadcast on Kamelia's birthday. In February 2011, readers of the Блясък magazine described Kamelia as the sexiest blonde in pop-folk. Apart from Payner, the television operator Bulsatcom promoted a separate 50,000th edition of the Project 13 album on its distribution network for two months. After the album there came a video of Kamelia performing song "Манастир".

=== 2012–present ===
In March 2012, at the annual music awards on Planeta Kamelia TV, Kamelia received a special award for 15 years of musical career from the company and presented the song "Лошо действаш ми". In March 2012 she took part in the comedy series Ракия Sunrise, which is part of Шоуто на Слави on bTV. In the same year, she became the host of the Miss Bulgaria contest together with the actor Kiril Efremov. In the autumn of 2013, Kamelia was again in the role of a TV presenter. The show she hosted was called Марс и Венера and was broadcast on Nova TV.

On 31 March 2014, Kamelia's video for the song "Престъпно е" premiered. This was followed by the duet song "Само за минута" by Galin and Kamelia, which premiered on 5 September 2014. On 27 October 2014, the singer left Payner for good. Since then, Kamelia has been presenting herself through her own music company: Kams Production OOD. The first song with a video that she presented in 2015 was "Неповторим". On 17 September, her song "Дай го двойно" appeared. On Christmas Day 2015, Kamelia presented her third song of the year, called "Добре дошла", for which a video had been made.

On 5 August 2016, Kamelia released the song "Минута живот", which became one of the most successful pop-folk songs in the summer of 2016 with over one million views on video-sharing sites. On 23 November 2016, it was announced that Kamelia would be a mentor in the new season of The Voice of Bulgaria in the spring of 2017. Following the success of Голямата уста, Kamelia received an offer from the production company No Frame Media to host her own social talk show on national television TV7.

On 8 February 2017, Kamelia's song titled "Плюшено мече" was released, with Alek. On 18 July 2017, Kamelia's song titled "Дръзни ме" was released, which is a duet with Gamzata and became one of the hits of the year. On 7 December 2017, the song "Куклите" was released. Almost a year later, on 23 September 2018, her duet with Sasho Roman "Името ти" was released, and became a hit that has about 10 million views. Six months later she remixed the song. On 28 September, the sequel to "Името ти" is about to be released, again with Sasho Roman, named "Хотел на греха".

== Advertisements ==
- In September 2005 she appeared in a TV commercial for the diet coffee 'Vita gold'.
- In September 2006, she was in a TV commercial for the energy drink Tantra.

== Discography ==
=== Studio albums ===
- Огън момиче (1998)
- Златна рибка (1999)
- Нещо горещо (2002)
- Има любов (2005)
- Erotica (2010)

=== Compilations ===
- Целувай ме + Best Collection (2006)
- Project 13 (2010)
- Златните хитове на Пайнер 3 – Камелия (2012)

=== Singles ===
- "Къде си ти" (2001)
- "Презареждане" (2004)

=== Video albums ===
- Best Video Selection (2005)
