= Big Brother All Stars 2018 =

Big Brother: Most Wanted 2018
- Season 6
- Presented by: Niki Kanchev; Aleksandra Sarchadjieva; Azis
- No. of days: 36
- No. of housemates: 12
- Winner: Stefan Ivanov - Wosh MC
- Runner-up: Djuliana Gani

Release
- Original network: Nova Television
- Original release: 5 November – 10 December 2018

Series chronology
- ← Previous; Season 5

Big Brother: Most Wanted 2018, also known as Big Brother All Stars 2018, was the sixth season of the All-Star spin-off of Big Brother and the twentieth-second season of the format in Bulgaria overall. It was announced on October 19, 2018. Followed the same air schedule as in previous years, it commenced on Nova Television on 5 November 2018, immediately after the VIP Brother 10 finale and lasted for a month, ending on 10 December 2018. It featured housemates from previous seasons of the show, as well as participants from other reality formats. Stefan "Wosh MC" Ivanov won with Dzhuliana Gani as the runner-up.

== Housemates ==
12 housemates entered the house on Day 1.

=== Albena ===
Albena Vuleva was a contestant from VIP Brother 6 where she finished fifth and The Celebrity Apprentice. She entered the house on Day 1 and was the sixth evicted on Day 33.

=== Djuliana ===
Djuliana Gani was a contestant from VIP Brother 9 where she finished fifth. She entered the house on Day 1 and finished second in the finale on Day 36.

=== Emilia ===
Emilia Tsvetkova "Emanuela" was a contestant from VIP Brother 8 where she finished third and The Mole 1. She entered the house on Day 1 and decided to walk out of the house on Day 22 with Martin.

=== Evgenia ===
Evgenia Kalkandzieva "Jeni" was a contestant from VIP Brother 6 where she finished fourth with her husband Stefan Manov "Tacho" and The Mole 1. She entered the house on Day 1 and was the first evicted on Day 8.

=== Nikita ===
Nikita Jönsson was a contestant from Big Brother 5 where she won. She entered the house on Day 1 and finished third in the finale on Day 36.

=== Stanimir ===
Stanimir Gumov "Gumata" was a contestant from VIP Brother 7 where he finished fourth and Your Face Sounds Familiar 1 where he finished third. He entered the house on Day 1 and finished fourth in the finale on Day 36.

=== Stefan ===
Stefan Ivanov "Wosh MC" was a contestant from VIP Brother 6 where he finished third. He entered the house on Day 1 and became a winner on Day 36.

=== Stoyan ===
Stoyan Royanov "Ya-Ya" was a Eurovision 2008 candidate. He entered the house on Day 1 and was the third evicted on Day 22.

=== Stoyko ===
Stoyko Sakaliev was a contestant from VIP Brother 5. He entered the house on Day 1 and was the fourth evicted on Day 29.

=== Tsvetan ===
Tsvetan Andreev "Tsetso" was a contestant from The Cherry of the Cake. He entered the house on Day 1 and was the fifth evicted on Day 33.

=== Vesela ===
Vesela Neynski was a contestant from VIP Brother 1. She entered the house on Day 1 and was the second evicted on Day 15.

=== Zlatka & Blagoy ===
Zlatka Raykova was a contestant from Temptation Island, Big Brother All Stars 2 where she finished fifth and Your Face Sounds Familiar 6 and Blagoy Georgiev "Dzhizusa" ("The Jesus") was a contestant from The Cherry of the Cake. They entered the house (as individual participants) on Day 1 and finished fifth in the finale on Day 36.

== Houseguests ==
=== Borislav ===
Borislav Borisov was a contestant from Big Brother 3, Big Brother All Stars 1 where he finished third and boyfriend of Nikita. He entered the House on Day 19 and left the House on Day 24.

=== Martin ===
Martin Nikolov "Elvisa" ("The Elvis") is a boyfriend of Emanuela. He entered the House on Day 18 and left the House on Day 22. Five years later participated in another format of NOVA Igri na volyata (Games of the willpower) which is the Bulgarian version of Desafío.

== Nominations table ==
	Week 1	Week 2	Week 3	Week 4	Week 5	Final		Nominations received
Stefan	Vesela, Stanimir	Emilia, Vesela	Stoyan, Nikita	Nikita, Tsvetan	Zlatka & Blagoy, Dzhuliana	Winner (Day 36)		4
Djuliana	Stoyko, Evgenia	Albena, Nikita	Stoyan, Emilia	Nikita, Stefan	Albena, Zlatka & Blagoy	Runner-up (Day 36)		2
Nikita	Stoyko, Evgenia	Tsvetan, Albena	Tsvetan, Stanimir	Tsvetan, Stoyko	Stefan, Zlatka & Blagoy	Third place (Day 36)		20
Stanimir	Vesela, Albena	Vesela, Albena	Zlatka & Blagoy, Nikita	Nikita, Zlatka & Blagoy	Stanimir, Dzhuliana	Fourth place (Day 36)		3
Zlatka & Blagoy	Vesela, Stefan	Emilia, Stoyan	Stanimir, Nikita	Nikita, Albena	Stefan, Tsvetan	Fifth place (Day 36)		3
Albena	Vesela, Evgenia	Nikita, Stoyan	Nikita, Stoyan	Nikita, Stefan	Stanimir, Dzhuliana	Evicted (Day 33)		9
Tsvetan	Vesela, Nikita	Emilia, Stoyan	Stoyan, Nikita	Nikita, Stefan	Zlatka & Blagoy, Stanimir	Evicted (Day 33)		9
Stoyko	Vesela, Nikita	Vesela, Nikita	Stoyan, Nikita	Nikita, Tsvetan	Evicted (Day 29)			3
Stoyan	Exempt	Albena, ~~Emilia~~	Tsvetan, Dzhuliana	Evicted (Day 22)				10
Emilia	Stoyan, Vesela	Vesela, Stoyan	Zlatka & Blagoy, Tsvetan	Walked (Day 22)				5
Vesela	Albena, Tsvetan	Emilia, Albena	Evicted (Day 15)					11
Evgenia	Nikita, Dzhuliana	Evicted (Day 8)						3
Notes	1	2, 3	4	5	6	none		
Against public vote	Albena, Evgenia, Nikita, Stoyko, Vesela	Albena, Emilia, Nikita, Stoyan, Vesela	Nikita, Stoyan, Tsvetan	Albena, Nikita, Stefan, Stoyko, Tsvetan, Zlatka & Blagoy	Albena, Nikita, Tsvetan	All; Housemates		
Walked	none		Emilia	none				
Evicted	Evgenia; Fewest votes to save	Vesela; Fewest votes to save	Stoyan; Fewest votes to save	Stoyko; Fewest votes to save	Tsvetan; Fewest votes (out of 7)	Zlatka & Blagoy; Fewest votes (out of 5)	Stanimir; Fewest votes (out of 4)	
Evicted	Evgenia; Fewest votes to save	Vesela; Fewest votes to save	Stoyan; Fewest votes to save	Stoyko; Fewest votes to save	Albena; Fewest votes (out of 6)	Nikita; Fewest votes (out of 3)	Dzhuliana; 39.6% (out of 2)	
Evicted	Evgenia; Fewest votes to save	Vesela; Fewest votes to save	Stoyan; Fewest votes to save	Stoyko; Fewest votes to save	Albena; Fewest votes (out of 6)	Stefan; 60.4% to win		

=== Notes ===
- ^Note 1: Stoyan failed to nominate two housemates and Big Brother deprive housemates without hot water.
- ^Note 2: After she was evicted, Evgenia gave immunity to Zlatka and Blagoy.
- ^Note 3: Stoyan's nomination to Emilia was voided because he didn't give a reason to nominate her and Big Brother stopped the housemates' electricity.
- ^Note 4: After she was evicted, Vesela gave immunity to Albena.
- ^Note 5: After he was evicted, Stoyan gave immunity to Stanimir.
- ^Note 6: During the fifth and final nominations, the housemates had to vote for out which they wanted to win. The person with the fewest of votes (Albena, Nikita and Tsvetan) were nominated for eviction.
