= Big Brother All-Stars (Bulgarian TV series) =

- Also known as: Big Brother: Most Wanted (5–6)
- Presented by: Niki Kanchev; Aleksandra Sarchadjieva Azis
- No. of seasons: 6

Production
- Running time: 90 minutes (approx.)
- Production companies: Oldschool Productions; Endemol

Original release
- Network: Nova Television
- Release: 19 November 2012 – 10 December 2018

Big Brother All-Stars is a Bulgarian reality television show. The show is a spin-off of the original series of Bulgarian Big Brother. It featured former housemates from previous series of Big Brother, VIP Brother and other reality show such as Survivor, X Factor, VIP Dance, Music Idol, The Mole, Temptation Island, MasterChef and The Farm.

From its inception in 2012, Big Brother All-Stars has been broadcast on Nova Television. The show is presented by Niki Kanchev. Aleksandra Sarchadjieva was a co-host.

For the fifth and sixth seasons, the show used the name Big Brother: Most Wanted.

== Season details ==
Season		Launch date	Final date	Days	Housemates	Winner
1	Big Brother All Stars 2012	19 November 2012	17 December 2012	29	11	Nikola Nasteski – Lester
2	Big Brother All Stars 2013	18 November 2013	16 December 2013	29	12	Zlatka Dimitrova
3	Big Brother All Stars 2014	19 November 2014	15 December 2014	27	10	Todor Slavkov
4	Big Brother All Stars 2015	16 November 2015	14 December 2015	29	8	Desislava
5	Big Brother: Most Wanted 2017	13 November 2017	11 December 2017	29	12	Georgi Tashev – Gino Biancalana
6	Big Brother: Most Wanted 2018	5 November 2018	10 December 2018	36	12	Stefan Ivanov – Wosh MC
