= Big Brother All Stars 2017 =

- Season 5
- Presented by: Niki Kanchev; Aleksandra Sarchadjieva
- No. of days: 29
- No. of housemates: 12
- Winner: Georgi Tashev - Gino Biancalana
- Runner-up: Konstantin Slavchev

Release
- Original network: Nova Television
- Original release: 13 November – 11 December 2017

Series chronology
- ← Previous; Season 4 Next → Season 6

Big Brother: Most Wanted 2017, also known as Big Brother All Stars 2017, was the fifth season of the All-Star spin-off of Big Brother and the twentieth season of the format in Bulgaria overall. It was announced on November 3, 2017. Followed the same air schedule as in 2012, 2013, 2014 and 2015, it commenced on Nova Television on 13 November 2017, immediately after the VIP Brother 9 finale and lasted for a month, ending on 11 December 2017. It featured housemates from previous seasons of the show, as well as participants from other reality formats. Georgi "Gino" Tashev won with Konstantin Slavchev as the runner-up.

== Housemates ==
12 housemates entered the house on Day 1.

=== Debora ===
Debora Ivanova was a Miss Bulgaria 2009 candidate. She entered the house on Day 1 and was ejected on Day 10.

=== Dimitar ===
Dimitar Kovachev "Funky" was a contestant from VIP Brother 4 2012 where he finished second. He entered the house on Day 1 and finished fourth in the finale on Day 29.

=== Georgi ===
Georgi Tashev "Gino Biancalana" - "White wool" was a contestant from VIP Brother 7 2015 where he won. He entered the house on Day 1 and became a winner on Day 29.

=== Gospodin ===
Gospodin Valev "Dinko" was a houseguest from The Farm 2 2016. He entered the house on Day 1 and finished third in the finale on Day 29.

=== Kiril ===
Kiril Simeonov was a contestant from Big Brother 5 2015 where he finished second. He entered the house on Day 1 and was the first evicted on Day 8.

=== Konstantin ===
Konstantin Slavchev was a contestant from VIP Brother 1 where he won. He entered the house on Day 1 and finished second in the finale on Day 29.

=== Luna ===
Luna Yordanova was a contestant from VIP Brother 7. She entered the house on Day 1 and was ejected on Day 24.

=== Lyudmila ===
Lyudmila Zahazhaeva was a houseguest from VIP Brother 6. She entered the house on Day 1 and finished sixth in the finale on Day 29.

=== Mariela ===
Mariela Nordel was a contestant from MasterChef 1. She entered the house on Day 1 and was the third evicted on Day 22.

=== Radomir ===
Radomir Yunakov "Dee" was a contestant from The Farm 2. He entered the house on Day 1 and was the second evicted on Day 15.

=== Svetlana ===
Svetlana Vasileva was a contestant from VIP Brother 7. She entered the house on Day 1 and finished fifth in the finale on Day 29.

=== Zornitsa ===
Zornitsa Lindareva was a contestant from VIP Brother 6. She entered the house on Day 1 and was the fourth evicted on Day 26.

== Nominations table ==
	Week 1	Week 2	Week 3	Week 4	Final		Nominations received
Georgi	Lyudmila	Luna, Mariela	Lyudmila, Dimitar	Svetlana, Lyudmila	Winner (Day 29)		3
Konstantin	Lyudmila	Mariela, Luna	Luna, Mariela	Dimitar, Georgi	Runner-up (Day 29)		1
Gospodin	Lyudmila	Radomir, Mariela	Lyudmila, Zornitsa	Konstantin, Lyudmila	Third place (Day 29)		6
Dimitar	~~Georgi~~	Luna, Georgi	Luna, Mariela	Lyudmila, Himself	Fourth place (Day 29)		5
Svetlana	Mariela	Luna, Mariela	Mariela, Luna	Dimitar, Gospodin	Fifth place (Day 29)		1
Lyudmila	Gospodin	Luna, Mariela	Mariela, Gospodin	Dimitar, Zornitsa	Sixth place (Day 29)		12
Zornitsa	Gospodin	Luna, Mariela	Gospodin, Mariela	Konstantin, Lyudmila	Evicted (Day 26)		2
Luna	Dimitar	Dimitar, Lyudmila	Dimitar, Konstantin	Exempt	Ejected (Day 24)		11
Mariela	Kiril	Radomir, Georgi	Svetlana, Lyudmila	Evicted (Day 22)			13
Radomir	Gospodin	Luna, Mariela	Evicted (Day 15)				2
Debora	Lyudmila	Ejected (Day 10)					0
Kiril	Lyudmila	Evicted (Day 8)					1
Nomination notes	1, 2, 3	none		4, 5	none		
Against public vote	Dimitar, Gospodin, Kiril, Luna, Lyudmila, Mariela	Dimitar, Georgi, Luna, Lyudmila, Mariela, Radomir	Dimitar, Gospodin, Luna, Lyudmila; Mariela	Gospodin, Georgi, Lyudmila, Zornitsa	All; Housemates		
Ejected	none	Debora	none	Luna	none		
Evicted	Kiril; Fewest votes to save	Radomir; Fewest votes to save	Mariela; Fewest votes to save	Zornitsa; Fewest votes (out of 7)	Lyudmila; Fewest votes (out of 6)	Svetlana; Fewest votes (out of 5)	
Evicted	Kiril; Fewest votes to save	Radomir; Fewest votes to save	Mariela; Fewest votes to save	Zornitsa; Fewest votes (out of 7)	Dimitar; Fewest votes (out of 4)	Gospodin; Fewest votes (out of 3)	
Evicted	Kiril; Fewest votes to save	Radomir; Fewest votes to save	Mariela; Fewest votes to save	Zornitsa; Fewest votes (out of 7)	Konstantin; 38% (out of 2)	Georgi; 62% to win	

=== Notes ===
- ^Note 1: Luna was nominated automatically by Big Brother after the policy violations in the weekly mission "Cowboys" and "Indians". However, she was still eligible to nominate.
- ^Note 2: Dimitar's nomination to Georgi was voided because he didn't give a reason to nominate him.
- ^Note 3: The first nominations were face-to-face. The housemates were obliged to nominate only one housemate and everyone who received at least one nomination faced eviction.
- ^Note 4: During the fourth and final nominations, the housemates had to choose the housemate they wanted to win (the name in green) and the housemate who they didn't want to win (the name in black). They were able to vote for themselves.
- ^Note 5: Luna didn't participate and couldn't nominate during the fourth and final nominations after a physical fight with the other housemates.
