= VIP Brother season 1 =

VIP Brother
- Season 1
- Presented by: Niki Kanchev; Evelina Pavlova
- No. of days: 29
- No. of housemates: 12
- Winner: Konstantin Slavchev
- Runner-up: Violeta Zdravkova

Release
- Original network: Nova Television
- Original release: 13 March – 10 April 2006

Season chronology
- Next → Season 2

VIP Brother 1 was the first season of the celebrity version of the Bulgarian reality television show Big Brother. In it, the Housemates are only famous people. The show follows the original Big Brother rules, but with some changes. For example, in VIP Brother, the show's duration is shortened to a month. The nominations and evictions are twice a week.

The show started on 13 March 2006 and ended on 10 April 2006. The hosts were Niki Kanchev and Evelina Pavlova. The show was aired on Nova Television. The winner was the pop-folk singer Konstantin, who was voted by 78% of the audience. He won 50,000 leva.

== Housemates ==
12 Housemates entered the House on Day 1.

Name	Age on entry	Notability	Hometown	Day entered	Day exited	Status
Konstantin Slavchev	29	Pop-folk singer	Sofia	1	29	Winner
Violeta Zdravkova	28	Model; Miss Bulgaria 1999	Sofia	1	29	Runner-up
Dicho Hristov	32	Musician, singer	Sofia	1	29	3rd Place
Dimitar Marinov "Mityo Pishtova"	50	Manager	Batak/Pavlikensko	1	29	4th Place
Damaskin "Dim" Dukov	41	TV host; manager	Sofia	1	29	5th Place
Kiril Valchev "Kiro Skalata"	35	Businessman	Sofia	1	29	6th Place
Lilana Deyanova	20	Singer	Sofia	1	27	Evicted
Galina Kurdova	27	Singer, part of the pop duet KariZma	Sofia	1	19	Walked
Lyubomir Milchev "Dandy"	43	Writer	Pernik/Sofia	1	19	Walked
Rayna Terziyska	24	Pop-folk singer	Sandanski	1	15	Evicted
Galya Litova	26	Model	Sofia	1	10	Walked
Vesela Neynski	34	Opera singer; actress	Sofia	1	10	Walked

=== Damaskin ===
Damaskin Dukov "Dim" is a manager (currently TV host). He entered the house on Day 1 and finished fifth in the finale on Day 29. After his participation in VIP Brother 1, Damaskin became host of the show Big Brother's Big Mouth.

=== Dimitar ===
Dimitar Marinov "Mityo Pishtova" is a showman. He entered the house on Day 1 and finished fourth in the finale on Day 29.

=== Dicho ===
Dicho Hristov is a musician and a pop singer. He entered the house on Day 1 and finished third in the finale on Day 29.

=== Galina ===
Galina Kurdova "Galya" is a pop singer from the famous pop duet KariZma. Currently she lives in Sofia (previously in Yambol). She was born in Sibir. She entered the house on Day 1 and left voluntarily on Day 19.

=== Galya ===
Galya Litova is a model. She entered the house on Day 1 and left voluntarily on Day 10. Her ex-fiancé Dicho was also a participant in the show.

=== Kiril ===
Kiril Valchev "Skalata" is a businessman. He entered the house on Day 1 and finished sixth in the finale on Day 29. 7 years later, he becomes a contestant in Big Brother All Stars 2013, where he is the third to be evicted.

=== Konstantin ===
Konstantin Slavchev is a pop-folk singer. He entered the house on Day 1 and became a winner on Day 29. 11 years late, he becomes a contestant on Big Brother: Most Wanted 2017, where he finishes in second.

=== Lilana ===
Lilana Deyanova is a pop singer. She entered the house on Day 1 and was the second evicted on Day 27, after receiving the fewest viewers' votes during the final week.

=== Lyubomir ===
Lyubomir Milchev "Dandy" is a writer. He entered the house on Day 1 and left voluntarily on Day 19. 7 years later, he becomes a contestant in Big Brother All Stars 2013, where he finishes in third.

=== Rayna ===
Rayna Terziyska is a pop-folk singer. She entered the house on Day 1 and was the first evicted on Day 15. During her 15 days on the show she was the subject of public scrutiny for her actions and behavior. 7 years later, she becomes a contestant in Big Brother All Stars 2013, where she finishes in fourth.

=== Vesela ===
Vesela Neynski is an opera singer and an actress. She entered the house on Day 1 and left voluntarily on Day 8. 12 years later, she becomes a contestant in Big Brother: Most Wanted 2018, where she is the second to be evicted.

=== Violeta ===
Violeta Zdravkova is a model and former Miss Bulgaria 1999. She entered the house on Day 1 with her 3-years daughter Danaya. There was a special room for the child. Danaya left the House on Day 12 to spend the weekend with her father and returned on Day 15. On Day 22, Violeta's mother took the child out of the House. She finished second in the finale on Day 29.

== Weekly summary and highlights ==
Week 1	Tasks	Miss VIP Brother - on Day 2 the housemates had to make a pageant and the men had to choose which one of the female housemates to be crowned. Fast, brave and skilful - for the first week task the housemates had to divide themselves into two teams, which would be competing in daily tasks. They wagered 50% of their week budget.
Week 1	Up for eviction	Rayna and Vesela. The nominations were cancelled after Vesela asked to leave.
Week 2	Tasks	The housemates were separated into two teams again - VIP and Sagapo. They had to record cover versions of the songs "It's Raining Men" and "Epimeno". Later, they were given the task to record music videos to the songs as well.
Week 2	Up for eviction	Damaskin and Rayna
Week 2	Exits	Vesela walked voluntarily on Day 8; Galya walked on Day 10.
Week 3	Up for eviction	Lyubomir and Dimitar. However, these nominations were cancelled, too because of Galina and Lyubomir's leaving.
Week 3	Exits	Rayna was evicted on Day 15; Galina and Lyubomir left voluntarily on Day 19.
Week 4	Tasks	The housemates were given a few day tasks.
Week 4	Exits	Lilana was evicted on Day 27.
Week 4	Final; Day 29	Kiril, Damaskin, Dimitar, Dicho and Violeta left at the final night. Konstantin was chosen as the winner of VIP Brother 1 with 78% positive vote.

== Nominations table ==
	Week 1	Week 2	Week 3	Final		Nominations Received
Konstantin	2-Galya, Lilana	2-Lilana, Galya	2-Lyubomir, Dimitar	Winner (Day 29)		9
Violeta	2-Dimitar, Rayna	2-Damaskin, Rayna	2-Galina, Lyubomir	Runner-up (Day 29)		0
Dicho	2-Dimitar, Vesela	2-Galina, Rayna	2-Galina, Lyubomir	Third place (Day 29)		0
Dimitar	2-Lyubomir, Kiril	2-Damaskin, Galina	2-Galina, Konstantin	Fourth place (Day 29)		20
Damaskin	2-Rayna, Dimitar	2-Kiril, Dimitar	2-Galina, Lyubomir	Fifth place (Day 29)		14
Kiril	2-Rayna, Dimitar	2-Damaskin, Rayna	2-Konstantin, Damaskin	Sixth place (Day 29)		4
Lilana	2-Dimitar, Rayna	2-Rayna, Dimitar	2-Lyubomir, Dimitar	Evicted (Day 27)		5
Galina	2-Dimitar, Lyubomir	2-Dimitar, Lyubomir	2-Damaskin, Lilana	Walked (Day 19)		12
Lyubomir	2-Dimitar, Konstantin	2-Damaskin, Konstantin	2-Konstantin, Damaskin	Walked (Day 19)		11
Rayna	2-Galya, Kiril	2-Damaskin, Lilana	Evicted (Day 15)			15
Galya	2-Rayna, Konstantin	2-Rayna, Konstantin	Walked (Day 10)			5
Vesela	2-Dimitar, Galina	Walked (Day 8)				2
Notes	1, 2, 3	4	5, 6, 7, 8	9		
Against public vote	Rayna, ~~Vesela~~	Damaskin, Rayna, ~~Violeta~~	~~Lyubomir~~, Dimitar	All; Housemates		
Walked	Vesela	Galya	Lyubomir, Galina	none		
Evicted	Eviction; Cancelled	Rayna; 51% to evict	Eviction; Cancelled	Lilana; 4% (out of 7)	Kiril; Fewest votes (out of 6)	
Evicted	Eviction; Cancelled	Rayna; 51% to evict	Eviction; Cancelled	Damaskin; Fewest votes (out of 5)	Dimitar; Fewest votes (out of 4)	
Evicted	Eviction; Cancelled	Rayna; 51% to evict	Eviction; Cancelled	Dicho; Fewest votes (out of 3)	Violeta; 22% (out of 2)	
Evicted	Eviction; Cancelled	Rayna; 51% to evict	Eviction; Cancelled	Konstantin; 78% to win		

=== Notes ===
- ^Note 1: Vesela was automatically nominated by the Secret inquisition.
- ^Note 2: Votes against Vesela were invalid, as she was already nominated by the Secret inquisition.
- ^Note 3: Vesela asked to leave and the nominations were cancelled.
- ^Note 4: Violeta was nominated by the Secret inquisition, but won the Lucky game.
- ^Note 5: Dimitar was automatically nominated by the Secret inquisition.
- ^Note 6: Votes against Dimitar were invalid, as he was already nominated by the Secret inquisition.
- ^Note 7: Galina won the Lucky game; Lyubomir was banned from participating in it for discussing the nominations.
- ^Note 8: The eviction was cancelled as Lyubomir and Galya K. asked to leave.
- ^Note 9: The public was voting for a winner between Lilana, Kiril, Damaskin, Dimitar, Dicho, Violeta and Konstantin. The Housemate with the fewest votes was evicted on Day 27.
