= VIP Brother =

Bulgarian reality television game show

- VIP Brother 10 logo
- Genre: Reality
- Created by: John de Mol Jr.
- Presented by: Current: Niki Kanchev (2006–2018); Aleksandra Sarchadjieva (2012–2018); Azis (2018); Former: Miglena Angelova (2017); Veneta Raykova (2014); Kamelia (2009); Dimitar Rachkov (2009); Maria Ignatova (2009); Evelina Pavlova (2006)
- Country of origin: Bulgaria
- Original language: Bulgarian
- No. of seasons: 10

Original release
- Network: Nova Television
- Release: 13 March 2006 – 2 November 2018

VIP Brother is a Bulgarian reality television game show in which a number of celebrity contestants live in an isolated house trying to avoid being evicted by the public with the aim of winning a large cash prize or collecting money for charity. The first three seasons of the show to date have aired in the spring (started in March) in 2006, 2007 and 2009, and last six seasons (commencing on September) in the autumn.

The show is a spin-off of the original series Big Brother. There are a number of differences between Big Brother and VIP Brother. For example, VIP Brother lasts for a shorter time than Big Brother - seasons 1 and 2 lasted for 4 and 5 weeks, respectively. Due to the show's popularity seasons 3–9 all lasted for two months. Regular editions usually last for three months (12–13 weeks). The celebrities are paid for their participation.

From its inception in 2006, VIP Brother has been broadcast on Nova Television. The show is presented by Niki Kanchev. Evelina Pavlova was a co-host during the first season, and Aleksandra Sarchadjieva in six seasons.

== History ==
VIP Brother first aired in March 2006 after the huge success of Big Brother 1 and Big Brother 2. The celebrity edition turned out to be even more successful and the second season in 2007 was extended to 33 Days. Due to rebuilding the House the Big Brother format in Bulgaria was on hiatus until September 2008 when Big Brother 4 aired, followed by VIP Brother 3 in March 2009. The third celebrity edition introduced a unique conception in which celebrities performed for charity every week and they were even allowed to leave the House collecting money for their causes. This was the first season to air for two months. After the moderate success of Big Brother Family (also known as Big Brother 5) in 2010 the format went on another hiatus for two years. In 2012, it was announced that Nova TV had closed a deal with Endemol for two seasons of the Big Brother format in Bulgaria. In September, VIP Brother 4 aired lasted for 63 Days (the longest celebrity season so far) and immediately followed by an all-star's edition. As VIP Brother proved to be a rating success, the show was renewed for another season in 2013 with VIP Brother 5 commenced on 15 September. In 2014, it was announced for communist rule (1944–1989) in VIP Brother 6. In 2015, VIP Brother 7 (also known as VIP Brother - 100% напудрен) was commenced on 13 September. In 2016, VIP Brother 8 (also known as VIP Brother: Играта загрубява) was commenced on 11 September and marked 10 years of the premiere of VIP Brother.

== Format ==
Like the original Big Brother, VIP Brother is a game show in which a group of celebrities, called the Housemates, live in isolation from the outside world in a house, which includes everyday facilities such as a fully equipped kitchen, garden, bedrooms, bathrooms and living area. The House is also a television studio with cameras and microphones in all rooms to record the activities of the Housemates. The only place where housemates can escape the company of the other contestants is the Diary Room, where they are encouraged to voice their true feelings. Each week (twice a week in VIP Brother 1 and 2), all Housemates nominate two of their fellow contestants for potential eviction (in season one and two they had to give two negative points to one Housemate and one negative point to another). The two, or more, Housemates with the highest number of nominations face a public vote conducted by phone (text messages). In VIP Brother 3, voting was positive and only a few Housemates were eligible to nominate, pointing all contestants who would not face the public vote. Occasionally, more than one housemate may be evicted in a week.

== Season details ==
Season	Launch date	Final date	Days	Housemates	Winner
VIP Brother 1	13 March 2006	10 April 2006	29	12	Konstantin
VIP Brother 2	26 March 2007	27 April 2007	33	13	Hristina Stefanova
VIP Brother 3	16 March 2009	10 May 2009	56	17	Deyan Slavchev
VIP Brother 4	16 September 2012	17 November 2012	63	16	Orlin Pavlov
VIP Brother 5	15 September 2013	17 November 2013	63	17	Stanka Zlateva
VIP Brother 6	15 September 2014	17 November 2014	64	18	Vladislav Karamfilov
VIP Brother 7	13 September 2015	13 November 2015	62	15	Georgi Tashev
VIP Brother 8	11 September 2016	11 November 2016	62	19	Miglena Angelova
VIP Brother 9	11 September 2017	10 November 2017	61	18	Yonislav Yotov
VIP Brother 10	10 September 2018	2 November 2018	54	17	Atanas Kolev
