= VIP Brother season 10 =

VIP Brother
- Season 10
- Presented by: Niki Kanchev; Aleksandra Sarchadjieva; Azis
- No. of days: 54
- No. of housemates: 17
- Winner: Atanas Kolev
- Runner-up: Konstantin

Release
- Original network: Nova Television
- Original release: 10 September – 2 November 2018

Series chronology
- ← Previous season 9

VIP Brother 10, also known as VIP Brother: Женско царство (lit. Women's Kingdom) was the tenth season of the Bulgarian reality television series VIP Brother. The show launched on 10 September 2018 on Nova TV and concluded 54 days later, on 2 November 2018. Atanas Kolev won, while Konstantin Trendafilov "Papi Hans" was the runner-up. Niki Kanchev, Aleksandra Sarchadjieva and Azis were the main presenters.

== Housemates ==
17 housemates entered the house on Day 1.

=== Atanas ===
Atanas Kolev is a rap singer, known for being a contestant on the second season of X Factor where he finished second. He entered the house on Day 1 and became the winner on Day 54.

=== Bozhana ===
Bozhana Katsarova is a cook and the winner of third season of MasterChef. She entered the house on Day 1 and finished fifth in the finale on Day 54.

=== Denislava ===
Denislava Sashova "Diona" is a rap singer. She entered the house on Day 1 and was the second evicted on Day 22.

=== Genoveva ===
Genoveva Naydenova "Eva" is a famous pop singer from famous pop group Tonika. She entered the house on Day 1 and was the third evicted on Day 29.

=== Ivan ===
Ivan Glavchev "Vanko 1" is a rap singer. He entered the house on Day 1 and decided to walk out of the house on Day 16.

=== Konstantin ===
Konstantin Trendafilov "Papi Hans" is a writer and pop singer. He entered the house on Day 1 and finished second in the finale on Day 54.

=== Mira ===
Mira Dobreva is a TV host. Her husband Georgi Tornev entered the VIP Brother 8 in 2016. She entered the house on Day 1 and was the fifth evicted on Day 50.

=== Nora ===
Nora Nedkova is a model and the winner of the title "Miss Playmate 2017". She entered the house on Day 1 and was the first evicted on Day 8.

=== Lora ===
Lora Karadzhova is a R&B singer and daughter of Yordan Karadzhov (the vocalist of the popular rock band Signal). She entered the house on Day 1 and was the sixth evicted on Day 52.

=== Petko ===
Petko Dimitrov is a businessman and husband of Yana. He entered the house on Day 1 and finished fourth in the finale on Day 54.

=== Richard ===
Richard Velichkov is a fitness instructor and model. He entered the house on Day 1 and was the seventh evicted on Day 52.

=== Rosemary ===
Rosemary Tisher is a model. Her father is German and her mother is Bulgarian. She entered the house on Day 1 and was the fourth evicted on Day 43.

=== Stefan ===
Stefan Nikolov is a businessman and husband of popular TV host Gala (who entered the VIP Brother 3 in 2009). He entered the house on Day 1 and finished third in the finale on Day 54.

=== Valentin ===
Valentin Kulagin is a makeup artist. He entered the house on Day 1 and was ejected on Day 36.

=== Vanya ===
Vanya Kostova is a famous pop singer and former member of Tonika. She entered the house on Day 1 and was the eighth evicted on Day 53.

=== Veselin ===
Veselin Plachkov is an actor. His fiancée Mariana Popova entered the VIP Brother 4 in 2012. He entered the house on Day 1 and decided to walk out of the house on Day 18.

=== Yana ===
Yana Akimova-Dimitrova is a dancer, choreograph in Dancing Stars, former girlfriend of Orlin Pavlov, who won VIP Brother 4 in 2012 and the wife of Petko. She entered the house on Day 1 and decided to walk out of the house on Day 10.

== Nominations table ==
	Week 1	Week 2	Week 3	Week 4	Week 5	Week 6	Week 7	Week 8	Final		Nominations received
Atanas	Valentin, Richard	Valentin, Denislava	Genoveva	Valentin, Genoveva	Valentin, Richard	Rosemary, Petko	Richard, Bozhana	No; Nominations	Winner (Day 54)		9
Konstantin	Nora, Valentin	Valentin, Denislava	Rosemary	Valentin, Genoveva	Valentin, Bozhana	Rosemary, Mira	Richard, Bozhana	No; Nominations	Runner-up (Day 54)		5
Stefan	Yana & Petko, Bozhana	Valentin, Denislava	Genoveva	Bozhana, Valentin	Bozhana, Valentin	Petko, Mira	Petko, Bozhana	No; Nominations	Third place (Day 54)		12
Petko	Nora, Rosemary	Valentin, Denislava	Rosemary	Valentin, Rosemary	Valentin, Stefan	Rosemary	Richard, Stefan	No; Nominations	Fourth place (Day 54)		7
Bozhana	Nora, Atanas	Valentin, Denislava	In Juvenile; Center	Genoveva, Stefan	Richard, Stefan	Rosemary, Stefan	Richard, Mira	No; Nominations	Fifth place (Day 54)		17
Vanya	Valentin, Ivan	Valentin, Denislava	Atanas	Bozhana, Lora	Valentin, Richard	Rosemary, Petko	Richard, Mira	No; Nominations	Evicted (Day 53)		4
Richard	Atanas, Genoveva	Atanas, Genoveva	Atanas	Vanya, Rosemary	Atanas, Konstantin	Bozhana, Stefan	Bozhana, Atanas	No; Nominations	Evicted (Day 52)		13
Lora	Valentin, Nora	Valentin, Denislava	Rosemary	Valentin, Vanya	Valentin, Rosemary	Stefan, Rosemary	Richard, Stefan	No; Nominations	Evicted (Day 52)		2
Mira	Valentin, Nora	Valentin, Richard	Rosemary	Genoveva, Valentin	Valentin, Richard	Stefan, Vanya	Richard, Bozhana	Evicted (Day 50)			4
Rosemary	Nora, Konstantin	~~Stefan~~, Genoveva	Petko	Valentin, Bozhana	Valentin, Bozhana	Lora, Bozhana	Evicted (Day 43)				14
Valentin	Nora, Konstantin	Veselin, Atanas	In Juvenile; Center	Petko, Bozhana	Konstantin, Atanas	Ejected (Day 36)					36
Genoveva	Valentin, Nora	Veselin, Stefan	Denislava	Bozhana, Valentin	Evicted (Day 29)						9
Denislava	Valentin, Nora	Valentin, Konstantin	Stefan	Evicted (Day 22)							10
Veselin	Valentin, Nora	Valentin, Denislava	In Juvenile; Center	Walked (Day 18)							2
Ivan	Nora, Vanya	Exempt	Walked (Day 16)								1
Yana	Nora, Rosemary	Valentin, Denislava	Walked (Day 10)								1
Nora	Valentin, Bozhana, Stefan	Evicted (Day 8)									11
Notes	1, 2	3, 4, 5, 6, 7	8, 9	10	11, 12, 13	14	15	16			
Against public vote	Atanas, Bozhana, Denislava, Konstantin, Nora, Valentin	Atanas, Denislava, Genoveva, Richard, Valentin, Veselin	Atanas, Denislava, Genoveva, Petko, Rosemary, Stefan	Bozhana, Genoveva, Valentin	Bozhana, Richard, Valentin	Petko, Rosemary, Stefan	Bozhana, Mira, Richard, Stefan	All; Housemates			
Walked	none	Yana	Ivan, Veselin	none							
Ejected	none				Valentin	none					
Evicted	Nora; Fewest votes to save	Eviction cancelled	Denislava; Fewest votes to save	Genoveva; Fewest votes to save	Eviction cancelled	Rosemary; 32% to save	Mira; Fewest votes to save	Lora; Fewest votes (out of 8)	Vanya; Fewest votes (out of 6)	Bozhana; Fewest votes (out of 5)	
Evicted	Nora; Fewest votes to save	Eviction cancelled	Denislava; Fewest votes to save	Genoveva; Fewest votes to save	Eviction cancelled	Rosemary; 32% to save	Mira; Fewest votes to save	Richard; Fewest votes (out of 7)	Petko; Fewest votes (out of 4)	Stefan; Fewest votes (out of 3)	
Evicted	Nora; Fewest votes to save	Eviction cancelled	Denislava; Fewest votes to save	Genoveva; Fewest votes to save	Eviction cancelled	Rosemary; 32% to save	Mira; Fewest votes to save	Richard; Fewest votes (out of 7)	Konstantin; 39.9 % (out of 2)	Atanas; 60.1 % to win	

=== Notes ===
- ^Note 1: Denislava was nominated automatically by Big Brother after the multiple conspiracies. However, she was still eligible to nominate.
- ^Note 2: Nora had the right to nominate three housemates to the end of the show.
- ^Note 3: After she was evicted, Nora gave immunity to Vanya.
- ^Note 4: Ivan couldn't nominate or be nominated by the other housemates after losing rights as a regular housemate.
- ^Note 5: Rosemary's nomination to Stefan was voided because she didn't give a reason to nominate him and Big Brother cut 10% of the budget for the week because the housemates didn't stand in the sofas during the face-to-face nominations.
- ^Note 6: Richard was nominated after a vote on Facebook.
- ^Note 7: Eviction was cancelled after Ivan's will to leave the house voluntary.
- ^Note 8: Valentin received the most votes during the cancelled second eliminations. Thus, he got the right to give immunity to one of the housemates. Valentin gave immunity to Richard.
- ^Note 9: Originally, Bozhana, Valentin and Veselin were ejected from the house after a huge physical and verbal fight. However, Big Brother gave them a second chance to earn their rights as housemates. They were put in a secret juvenile center in order to improve their relations.
- ^Note 10: After she was evicted, Denislava gave immunity to Richard.
- ^Note 11: After she was evicted, Genoveva gave immunity to Vanya.
- ^Note 12: Eviction was cancelled after clash between Vanya and Valentin. Viewers in Facebook had to determine who should be forcibly removed from the show.
- ^Note 13: After he was ejected, Valentin gave immunity to Richard.
- ^Note 14: Petko failed to nominate a second housemate and Big Brother restrict access to fitness of housemates.
- ^Note 15: After she was evicted, Rosemary gave immunity to Vanya.
- ^Note 16: The public were voting to win rather than to save.
