= Big Brother All Stars 2013 =

- Season 2
- Presented by: Niki Kanchev; Aleksandra Sarchadjieva
- No. of days: 29
- No. of housemates: 12
- Winner: Zlatka Dimitrova
- Runner-up: Leonardo

Release
- Original network: Nova Television
- Original release: 18 November – 16 December 2013

Season chronology
- ← Previous; Season 1 Next → Season 3

Big Brother All Stars 2013 was the second season of the All-Star spin-off of Big Brother and the twelfth season of the format in Bulgaria overall. It was confirmed by Niki Kanchev on October 21 during the fifth live eviction on VIP Brother 5. Followed the same air schedule as in 2012, it commenced on Nova on 18 November 2013, immediately after the VIP Brother 5 finale and lasted for a month, ended on 16 December 2013. It featured housemates from previous seasons of the show, as well as participants from other reality formats such as X Factor, Survivor and The Cherry of the Cake. Zlatka Dimitrova won with Leonardo Bianchi as the runner-up.

== Housemates ==
9 housemates entered the house on Day 1, including Zlatka D. and Zlatka R. and another one on Day 3.

=== Eli ===
Eli Vladkova was a contestant from Big Brother Family. She and her husband Veselin were the winners of the family edition. She entered the house on Day 1 and was the fifth evicted on Day 24.

=== Kiril ===
Kiril Valchev "Skalata" ("The Rock") was a contestant from VIP Brother 1 where he finished sixth. He entered the house on Day 1 and was the third evicted on Day 22.

=== Leonardo ===
Leonardo Bianchi "Leo" was a contestant from Big Brother 2 where he finished second. He entered the house on Day 1 and finished second in the finale on Day 29.

=== Lyubomir ===
Lyubomir Milchev "Dandy" was a contestant from VIP Brother 1. He entered the house on Day 1 and finished third in the finale on Day 29.

=== Lyudmil ===
Lyudmil Avgustinov "Jeason Brad Lewis" was a contestant from X Factor 1. He entered the house on Day 1 and was ejected on Day 12. This is the third ejection in the history of the Bulgarian format - after Nayden and Svetlan being ejected from Big Brother 1 in 2004, and Daniel and Danail from Big Brother 4 in 2008.

=== Magdalena ===
Magdalena Zhelyazkova "Magi" was a contestant from VIP Brother 2 where she finished sixth. She entered the house on Day 1 and was the fourth evicted on Day 22.

=== Nedyalko ===
Nedyalko Lazarov was a contestant from Big Brother 2. He entered the house on Day 1 and was the first evicted on Day 8.

=== Penka ===
Penka Georgieva is a Miss Bulgaria 2013 candidate. She entered the house on Day 1 and was the second evicted on Day 15.

=== Rayna ===
Rayna Terziyska was a contestant from VIP Brother 1 and VIP Dance where she won. She entered the house on Day 3 and finished fourth in the finale on Day 29.

=== Stanislav ===
Stanislav Iliev "Findo" was a contestant from Survivor 2. He entered the house on Day 1 and was the sixth evicted on Day 24.

=== Zlatka D. ===
Zlatka Dimitrova is a former Playmate model in the Bulgarian version of Playboy Playmate. She was the first confirmed housemate on October 21 during the fifth live eviction show of VIP Brother 5. She was a contestant in VIP Brother 4. She entered the VIP Brother 5 house on Day 37 and stayed in the house as a guest until the end of the show on Day 63. She became a winner on Day 29.

=== Zlatka R. ===
Zlatka Raykova is a former Playmate model in the Bulgarian version of Playboy Playmate. She entered the VIP Brother 5 house on Day 44 and stayed in the house as a guest until the end of the show on Day 63. She was a participant in the reality show Temptation Island in 2007. She finished fifth in the finale on Day 29.

== Nominations table ==
	Week 1	Week 2	Week 3	Final		Nominations received
Zlatka D.	Nedyalko, Lyudmil	Penka, Lyudmil	Lyubomir, Kiril	Winner (Day 29)		15
Leonardo	Zlatka R., Nedyalko	Lyudmil, Zlatka R.	Zlatka R., Rayna	Runner-up (Day 29)		2
Lyubomir	Nedyalko, Lyudmil	Zlatka D., Zlatka R.	Zlatka D., Zlatka R.	Third place (Day 29)		6
Rayna	Not in House	Zlatka D.	Kiril; Lyubomir	Fourth place (Day 29)		1
Zlatka R.	Lyudmil, Leonardo	Penka, Lyudmil	Kiril, Lyubomir	Fifth place (Day 29)		9
Stanislav	Zlatka D.	Penka, Lyudmil	Lyubomir, ~~Zlatka R.~~	Evicted (Day 24)		1
Eli	Zlatka D., Lyudmil	Zlatka D., Stanislav	Zlatka D.	Evicted (Day 24)		0
Magdalena	Nedyalko, Lyubomir	Penka, Kiril	Kiril, Lyubomir	Evicted (Day 22)		3
Kiril	Zlatka D., Magdalena	Zlatka D., Zlatka R.	Zlatka D., Zlatka R.	Evicted (Day 22)		6
Penka	Zlatka R., Zlatka D.	Magdalena, Zlatka D.	Evicted (Day 15)			4
Lyudmil	Zlatka D., Zlatka R.	Zlatka D., Zlatka R.	Ejected (Day 12)			9
Nedyalko	Zlatka D. Lyudmil	Evicted (Day 8)				4
Nomination notes	none					
Head of House	Stanislav	Rayna	Eli	none		
Against public vote	Lyudmil, Kiril, Nedyalko, Zlatka R.	~~Lyudmil~~, Leonardo, Penka, Zlatka R.	Kiril; Lyubomir; Magdalena; Zlatka D. Zlatka R.	All; Housemates		
Ejected	none	Lyudmil	none			
Evicted	Nedyalko; Fewest votes to save	Penka; Fewest votes to save	Kiril; Fewest votes to save	Eli; Fewest votes (out of 7)	Stanislav; Fewest votes (out of 6)	
Evicted	Nedyalko; Fewest votes to save	Penka; Fewest votes to save	Kiril; Fewest votes to save	Zlatka R. Fewest votes (out of 5)	Rayna; Fewest votes (out of 4)	
Evicted	Nedyalko; Fewest votes to save	Penka; Fewest votes to save	Magdalena; Fewest votes to save	Lyubomir; Fewest votes (out of 3)	Leonardo; 40.1% (out of 2)	
Evicted	Nedyalko; Fewest votes to save	Penka; Fewest votes to save	Magdalena; Fewest votes to save	Zlatka D. 59.9% to win		
