= Riton (Bulgarian duo) =

Bulgarian pop duo

- Origin: Sofia, Bulgaria
- Genres: Pop
- Years active: 1977–present
- Members: Katya Mihaylova; Zdravko Jelyaskov
- Website: riton.net

Riton (Ритон) is a Bulgarian pop duo from Sofia, consisting of Katya Mihaylova and Zdravko Jelyaskov, active since 1977. They have released 11 studio albums, 1 live record, and 4 compilations.

== History ==
Riton was founded in 1977 by Katya Mihaylova (Катя Михайлова) and Zdravko Jelyaskov (Здравко Желязков), one year after they met at the National Academy of Music in Sofia. Mihaylova sings and plays piano, while Jelyaskov sings. Originally called Studio 2, the duo had been performing in variety shows and at resorts since 1976. After returning from Poland in 1978, the two got married.

Studio 2 were noticed by musician and composer Toncho Rusev in 1976, who in turn introduced them to composer Ivan Kutikov, with whom they recorded their first song, in 1980. In 1981, with the help of Kutikov, the duo, by this point calling themselves Riton, released their debut studio album, Embrace Me (Прегърни ме). Their second album, simply titled Duet Riton (Дует Ритон), came out in 1984. By 1997, the duo had released three further studio albums as well as two hits collections. That year, they celebrated their 20th anniversary as performers and won the Grand Prix at the Golden Orpheus song festival, with their song "Fire and Smoke" ("Огън и дим"). They followed this with the album Pain of Love (Болка от любов) in 1998.

In 2015, Riton took part in the seventh season of the reality television game show VIP Brother.

As of 2026, the duo has released five further studio albums, a live record, and two additional compilations, as well as numerous singles.

== Discography ==
Studio albums

- Embrace Me Прегърни ме (1981)
- Duet Riton Дует Ритон (1984)
- Love-Match Брак по любов (1986)
- Going at Random Накъдето ми видят очите (1987)
- Dzhalma Джалма (1994)
- Pain of Love Болка от любов (1998)
- Buy Our Hearts Купете сърцата ни (2000)
- All Night Цяла Нощ (2001)
- The Way to Your Heart Пътят Към Твоето Сърце (2015)
- In the Rhythm Latino в ритъма латино (2017)
- Something Is Happening Случва се нещо (2024)

Live albums

- Riton Live Ритон – live (2004)

Compilations

- The Hits (1993)
- The Best (1996)
- Two Stars – Golden Collection Две звезди – Златна колекция (2007)
- Golden Riton Златен Ритон (2017)
