= VIP Brother season 6 =

VIP Brother
- Season 6
- Presented by: Niki Kanchev; Aleksandra Sarchadjieva
- No. of days: 64
- No. of housemates: 18
- Winner: Vladi Vargala
- Runner-up: Yordanka Hristova

Release
- Original network: Nova Television
- Original release: 15 September – 17 November 2014

Series chronology
- ← Previous season 5 Next → season 7

VIP Brother 6, also known as VIP Brother: Образцов дом (lit. Model House) was the sixth season of the reality show VIP Brother in Bulgaria and the thirteenth season of the Big Brother format overall. The promo for the new season began airing on Nova Television on July 25, 2014. The show commenced on September 15, 2014. Niki Kanchev and Aleksandra Sarchadjieva returned as main presenters. During the live shows in Monday and Wednesday there were permanent commentators - TV producer Magarditch Halvadjian, TV host and VIP Brother 2 contestant Veneta Raykova, TV host and VIP Brother 4 contestant Nikol Stankulova, Miss Bulgaria 2006 Slavena Vatova (from week 2, replacing buissenesman Aleksandar Naydenov) and PR expert and housemate in the season Evgeni Minchev (from week 6, after his eviction).

This season was reminiscent to the 1944–1989 communist rule in Bulgaria. It marked 70 years since 9 September 1944, 25 years since the fall of communism in Bulgaria on 10 November 1989, 30 years from George Orwell's 1984, on which the Big Brother format was based on, as well as 10 years since the premiere of the Big Brother format in Bulgaria in 2004. Vladi Vargala won with Yordanka Hristova as the runner-up.

== Housemates ==
15 Housemates entered the House on Day 1. They were joined by 3 other Housemates on Day 3.

Name	Age on entry	Notability	Hometown	Day entered	Day exited	Status
Vladi Vargala	47	Actor	Silistra	3	64	Winner
Yordanka Hristova	71	Pop Singer	Sofia	1	64	Runner-up
Wosh MC	30	Rapper	Sofia	3	64	Third Place
Evgenia Kalkandjieva	39	Model, Miss Bulgaria 1995, Businesswoman	Sofia	1	64	Fourth Place
Stefan Manov "Tacho"	29	Evgenia's Husband	Sofia	29	64	Fourth Place
Stefan Manov "Tacho"	29	Evgenia's Husband	Sofia	1	15	Ejected
Albena Vuleva	38	TV Host	Saint Petersburg	1	64	Fifth Place
Elena Kuchkova	25	Model, Miss Playmate 2013	Chernogorovo	1	64	Sixth Place
Kali	38	Pop-folk Singer	Sofia	1	61	Eliminated
Eli Gigova	32	TV Host, Journalist	Sofia	1	59	Eliminated
Kamelia Voche	51	Singer, TV Host	Sofia	1	59	Eliminated
Ivo Arakov	25	Actor	Beloslav	1	57	Eliminated
Atanas Mesechkov	26	Dancer, Professionalist in Dancing Stars	Stara Zagora	1	57	Eliminated
Zornitsa Lindareva	31	Model, Tacho's Lover	Sofia	3	50	Eliminated
Kamelia Todorova	60	Jazz Singer	Sofia	1	43	Eliminated
Iva Ekimova	38	TV Host, PR Expert	Sofia	1	36	Eliminated
Titi Papazov	47	Basketball Coach	Sofia	1	31	Walked
Evgeni Minchev	51	PR Expert	Zlatitsa	1	29	Eliminated
Martin Martinov	27	Model, Mister Bulgaria 2009	Sofia	1	22	Eliminated

=== Albena ===
Albena Vuleva is a Bulgarian TV host who became famous in 2002 when she first started the controversial tabloid TV show Singalno zhalto (Yellow signal in English) on the cable channel Skat, making insulting comments about various celebrities. Her father is Bulgarian and her mother - Lyudmila Zahazhaeva is Russian. She was born in Saint Petersburg, Russia. She entered the House on Day 1 and finished fifth in the finale on Day 64.

=== Atanas ===
Atanas Mesechkov is a dancer and choreograph in Dancing Stars. He entered the House on Day 1 and was the sixth evicted on Day 57.

=== Elena ===
Elena Kuchkova is a former participant of the Bulgarian version of Playboy Playmate, Miss Playmate 2013 Bulgaria. She entered the House on Day 1 and finished sixth in the finale on Day 64.

=== Eli ===
Eleonora "Eli" Gigova is a TV host and daughter of the owner of PFC Lokomotiv Sofia Nikolay Gigov. She entered the House on Day 1 and was the ninth evicted on Day 59.

=== Evgeni ===
Evgeni Minchev is a famous Bulgarian gay man involved in Bulgarian highlife PR. He entered the House on Day 1 and had the power with Yordanka to choose half of the contestants who would live in the misery house. The two were also privileged to sleep in a separate room. He was the second evicted on Day 29.

=== Evgenia ===
Evgenia "Jeni" Kalkandzieva is a model and former Miss Bulgaria 1995. She also finished in sixth place on the Miss World 1995 pageant, which is so far the best result for any Bulgarian participant. She entered the House on Day 1 with her husband Tacho and finished fourth in the finale on Day 64.

=== Iva ===
Iva Ekimova is a TV host. She entered the House on Day 1 and was the third evicted on Day 36.

=== Ivo ===
Ivo Arakov is an actor. He entered the House on Day 1 and was the seventh evicted on Day 57.

=== Kali ===
Kali (born Galina Ivanova) is a pop-folk singer. She entered the House on Day 1 and was the tenth evicted on Day 61.

=== Kamelia T. ===
Kamelia Todorova is a jazz singer. She entered the House on Day 1 and was the fourth evicted on Day 43.

=== Kamelia V. ===
Kamelia Voche (born Kamelia Gesheva) is a TV host and singer. She entered the House on Day 1 and was the eighth evicted on Day 59.

=== Martin ===
Martin Martinov is a male model and former Mister Bulgaria 2009. He entered the House on Day 1 and was the first evicted on Day 22.

=== Tacho ===
Stefan Manov, aka Tacho is Evgenia Kalkandjieva's husband. He entered the House on Day 1 with his wife Evgenia and was ejected on Day 15 for slapping Zornitsa, his former lover, in the face. He was allowed to re-enter the House on Day 29 in order to show that he changed his behavior toward his wife Evgenia, but not as a full-right Housemate and finished fourth in the finale on Day 64.

=== Titi ===
Konstantin "Titi" Papazov is a basketball coach. He entered the House on Day 1 and decided to walk out of the House on Day 31.

=== Vladi ===
Vladislav Karamfilov, aka Vladi Vargala is an actor. He entered the House on Day 3 and became a winner on Day 64.

=== Wosh ===
Wosh MC (born Stefan Ivanov) is a rap singer. He entered the House on Day 3 and finished third in the finale on Day 64.

=== Yordanka ===
Yordanka Hristova is a famous singer. She entered the House on Day 1 and had the power with Evgeni to choose half of the contestants who would live in the misery house. The two were also privileged to sleep in a separate room. She finished second in the finale on Day 64.

=== Zornitsa ===
Zornitsa Lindareva is a model and former lover of Tacho. She entered the House on Day 3 and was the fifth evicted on Day 50.

== Houseguests ==
=== Lyudmila ===
Lyudmila Zahazhaeva is the mother of Albena Vuleva. She is from Saint Petersburg, Russia. She entered the House on Day 31 and left the House on Day 57. 3 years later she participated in Big Brother: Most Wanted 2017, where she took sixth place in the final.

== Nominations table ==
	Week 1	Week 2	Week 3	Week 4	Week 5	Week 6	Week 7	Week 8	Week 9	Final		Nominations received
Vladi	Albena, Elena	~~Kali~~	Elena, Zornitsa	Iva, Kali	Kamelia V., Evgenia & Tacho	Kamelia V., Kali	Kamelia V., Kali	Yordanka, Himself	No; Nominations	Winner (Day 64)		11
Yordanka	Zornitsa, Tacho, ~~Evgeni~~	Martin, Elena, Tacho	Elena, Zornitsa	Albena, Zornitsa	Evgenia & Tacho, Ivo	Albena, Evgenia & Tacho	Albena, Kamelia V.	Herself, Elena	No; Nominations	Runner-up (Day 64)		8
Wosh	Elena, Atanas	Elena, Evgenia	Evgenia, Martin	Evgeni, Elena	Yordanka, Evgenia & Tacho	Evgenia & Tacho, Kamelia V.	Zornitsa, Kamelia V.	Eli, Elena	No; Nominations	Third place (Day 64)		6
Evgenia	Atanas, Ivo	Martin, Wosh	Evgeni, Kali	Kali, Zornitsa	Eli, Wosh	Albena, Zornitsa	Albena, Vladi	Eli, Albena	No; Nominations	Fourth place (Day 64)		23
Tacho	Zornitsa, Kamelia T.	Evgeni, Elena	Ejected (Day 15)		Eli, Wosh	Albena, Zornitsa	Albena, Vladi	Eli, Albena	No; Nominations	Fourth place (Day 64)		21
Albena	Vladi, Titi	Kamelia T., Elena	Kali, Ivo	Kali, Iva	Evgenia & Tacho, Kali	Evgenia & Tacho, Kamelia V.	Kamelia V., Elena	Wosh, Elena	No; Nominations	Fifth place (Day 64)		27
Elena	Zornitsa, Wosh	Albena, Iva	Ivo, Martin	Wosh, Yordanka	Iva, Atanas	~~Kamelia T.~~, Atanas	Albena, Eli	Kali, Albena	No; Nominations	Sixth place (Day 64)		25
Kali	Vladi, Evgeni	Evgeni, Vladi	Atanas, Martin	Albena, Zornitsa	Vladi, Evgenia & Tacho	Albena, Kamelia T.	Albena, Vladi	Yordanka, Albena	No; Nominations	Evicted (Day 61)		16
Eli	Albena, Zornitsa	Albena, Elena	Kali, Wosh	Elena, Zornitsa	Evgenia & Tacho, Iva	Albena, Evgenia & Tacho	Albena, Kali	Yordanka, Herself	No; Nominations	Evicted (Day 59)		6
Kamelia V.	Evgeni, Yordanka	Tacho, Evgenia	Evgenia, Zornitsa	Evgeni, Yordanka	Zornitsa, Elena	Albena, Vladi	Vladi, Albena	Wosh, Albena	No; Nominations	Evicted (Day 59)		14
Ivo	Atanas, Zornitsa	Kali, Elena	Zornitsa, Elena	Albena, Zornitsa	Yordanka, Kamelia V.	Evgenia & Tacho, Kamelia T.	Albena, Zornitsa	Wosh, Albena	Evicted (Day 57)			9
Atanas	Zornitsa, Evgeni	Martin, Evgeni	Evgenia, Kali	Elena, Wosh	Iva, Evgenia & Tacho	Evgenia & Tacho, Vladi	Zornitsa, Kamelia V.	Wosh, Evgenia & Tacho	Evicted (Day 57)			7
Zornitsa	Kamelia T., Kali	Kali, Kamelia T.	Evgenia, Ivo	Kamelia T., Yordanka	Kamelia V., Yordanka	Kamelia T., Atanas	Yordanka, Albena	Evicted (Day 50)				30
Kamelia T.	~~Evgeni~~, Zornitsa	Tacho, Elena	Albena, Zornitsa	Zornitsa, Kamelia V.	Evgenia & Tacho, Iva	Zornitsa, Albena	Evicted (Day 43)					9
Iva	Ivo, Eli	Eli, Elena	Martin, Ivo	Zornitsa, Elena	Ivo, Vladi	Evicted (Day 36)						7
Titi	Evgenia, Evgeni	~~Evgeni,~~; ~~Yordanka~~	Elena, Zornitsa	Elena, Zornitsa	Walked (Day 31)							1
Evgeni	Ivo, Kamelia V., ~~Yordanka~~	Kamelia T., Tacho, Eli	Kamelia V., Zornitsa	Elena, Zornitsa	Evicted (Day 29)							11
Martin	Zornitsa, Kali	Tacho, Evgenia	Kali, Evgeni	Evicted (Day 22)								7
Nomination notes	1	2	3	4	5	6	7	8	none			
Head of House	Evgeni, Yordanka		Kamelia T.	none	Evgenia & Tacho	Elena	Ivo	Kali	none			
Against public vote	Atanas, ~~Evgeni~~, Ivo, Zornitsa	Elena, Evgeni, Evgenia, Kamelia T., Martin, Tacho	Kali, Martin, Yordanka, Zornitsa	Albena, Elena, Evgeni, Kali, Yordanka, Zornitsa	Iva, Ivo, ~~Kamelia V.~~; Vladi, ~~Yordanka~~	Albena, ~~Eli~~, Evgenia & Tacho, Kamelia V., Kamelia T., Zornitsa	Albena, Kamelia V., Wosh, Vladi, Zornitsa	Albena, Atanas, ~~Elena~~, ~~Evgenia & Tacho~~, Ivo, Kamelia V., Vladi	All; Housemates			
Walked	none				Titi	none						
Ejected	none	Tacho	none									
Evicted	No; Eviction	Eviction cancelled	Martin; 17% to save	Evgeni; 15.2% to save	Iva; 9.2% to save	Kamelia T. 7.1% to save	Zornitsa; Fewest votes to save	Atanas; 4.8% to save	Kamelia V. Fewest votes (out of 9)	Kali; Fewest votes (out of 7)	Elena; Fewest votes (out of 6)	
Evicted	No; Eviction	Eviction cancelled	Martin; 17% to save	Evgeni; 15.2% to save	Iva; 9.2% to save	Kamelia T. 7.1% to save	Zornitsa; Fewest votes to save	Atanas; 4.8% to save	Kamelia V. Fewest votes (out of 9)	Albena; Fewest votes (out of 5)	Evgenia & Tacho; Fewest votes (out of 4)	
Evicted	No; Eviction	Eviction cancelled	Martin; 17% to save	Evgeni; 15.2% to save	Iva; 9.2% to save	Kamelia T. 7.1% to save	Zornitsa; Fewest votes to save	Ivo; 6.1% to save	Eli; Fewest votes (out of 8)	Wosh; Fewest votes (out of 3)	Yordanka; Fewest votes (out of 2)	
Evicted	No; Eviction	Eviction cancelled	Martin; 17% to save	Evgeni; 15.2% to save	Iva; 9.2% to save	Kamelia T. 7.1% to save	Zornitsa; Fewest votes to save	Ivo; 6.1% to save	Eli; Fewest votes (out of 8)	Vladi; Most votes to win		

=== Notes ===
- ^Note 1: The Head of Houses were immune without the other housemates knowing, and nominated 3 housemates instead of 2. However, no one was evicted, as it was a fake eviction.
- ^Note 2: This time, the Head of Houses were not immune, as they were the same as last week. However, they nominated 3 housemates like last week. Atanas, Ivo and Zornitsa won immunity as they were fake evicted. Vladi and Titi's nominations were voided because they had a disrespectful behavior towards Big Brother. Eviction was cancelled due to Tacho slapping Zornitsa in the face. He was ejected.
- ^Note 3: Kamelia T. won the challenge and won HoH. Yordanka lost, and was automatically nominated. As HoH, Kamelia T. gave Iva and Titi immunity. The commentators of the show had to nominate one housemate. Magi nominated Elena, Veneta nominated Martin, Slavena nominated Eli and Sasho nominated Martin. As there was a majority, Martin was nominated.
- ^Note 4: There was no HoH this week. The commenters of the show nominated one housemate. Nikol nominated Evgeni, Magi nominated Eli, Veneta nominated Evgeni and Slavena nominated Evgeni. Evgeni was nominated as a result of the majority.
- ^Note 5: Evgenia & Tacho won HoH after completing the mission of being the most nominated housemates. Kamelia V., Yordanka, Iva, Vladi and Ivo were initially nominated. The commenters of the show had to save 2 of the nominees. They chose to save Kamelia V. and Yordanka.
- ^Note 6: Elena won the challenge and won HoH. Eli lost, and was automatically nominated. As HoH, Elena gave immunity to Ivo and Wosh. Elena's nomination to Kamelia T. was voided because she didn't gave a reason to nominate her. Albena, Evgenia & Tacho, Eli, Kamelia T. and Kamelia V. were nominated. However, the public voted on Facebook for the last nominee, which was Zornitsa. However, the home board could save one of the nominees, they decided to save Eli.
- ^Note 7: Ivo won the challenge and won HoH. Wosh lost, and was automatically nominated. As HoH, Ivo gave immunity to Evgenia & Tacho and Atanas.
- ^Note 8: Kali won the challenge and won HoH. No one was automatically nominated this time. In this nominations, housemates had to first vote for who they wanted to win (first name in green, granting +1 point) and second for who they do not wanted to win (second name in black, granting -1 point). They were able to vote for themselves and were able to give positive votes to Kali. Albena, Elena, Evgenia & Tacho, Vladi, Atanas, Ivo and Kamelia V. were initially nominated. As HoH, Kali could save 2 of the nominees. She saved Evgenia & Tacho and Elena.
