= VIP Brother season 5 =

VIP Brother
- Season 5
- Presented by: Niki Kanchev; Aleksandra Sarchadjieva
- No. of days: 63
- No. of housemates: 17
- Winner: Stanka Zlateva
- Runner-up: Marian

Release
- Original network: Nova Television
- Original release: 15 September – 16 November 2013

Series chronology
- ← Previous season 4 Next → season 6

VIP Brother 5, also referred to as VIP Brother 2013 was the fifth season of the reality show VIP Brother in Bulgaria and the eleventh season of the Big Brother format overall. It was confirmed by Nova Television on June 26, 2013, and commenced on September 15, 2013, and lasted for 63 days, ended on November 16, 2013, holding the record for longest VIP season of the Big Brother format in Bulgaria together with the fourth season from 2012. Niki Kanchev and Aleksandra Sarchadjieva returned as main presenters. Stanka Zlateva won with Marian Kyurpanov as the runner-up.

== Pre-season ==
=== Logo ===
As in VIP Brother 4 the logo from the most recent British version of the format was used.

== Housemates ==
9 Housemates entered the House on Day 1. They were joined by Paris Hilton and 8 other celebrities on Day 2.

=== Angel ===
Angel Rashkov is a businessman and son of Roma boss Kiril Rashkov "Tsar Kiro" ("King Kiro"). He entered the House on Day 1 and walked on Day 5.

=== Anna ===
Anna Yanova-Katur is a singer, wife of Jared and daughter of Mira. She entered the House on Day 2 and was the fourth evicted on Day 30.

=== Edelweiss ===
Edelweiss is a Bulgarian pornographic actress of Russian descent. She entered the House on Day 2 and was the first evicted on Day 9.

=== Irina ===
Irina Kostadinova "Florin" is a pop singer. She entered the House on Day 2 and was the eighth evicted on Day 58.

=== Ivaylo ===
Ivaylo Stanchev is a constructor and boyfriend of Mira. He entered the House on Day 1 and was the second evicted on Day 16.

=== Jared ===
Jared Katur is a musician and husband of Anna. He entered the House on Day 2 and was the third evicted on Day 23.

=== Lilyana ===
Lilyana Popova "Liyana" is a pop-folk singer. She entered the House on Day 1 and finished fifth in the finale on Day 63.

=== Marian ===
Marian Kyurpanov is a model. He entered the House on Day 1 and finished second in the finale on Day 63.

=== Mihail ===
Mihail Mihaylov "Misho Shamara" ("Big Sha") is a rap singer. He entered the House on Day 1 and was the seventh evicted on Day 51.

=== Mira ===
Mira Radeva is a sociologist. She entered the House on Day 1 with her boyfriend Ivaylo. Her daughter Anna and her son-in-law entered on Day 2. She was the ninth evicted on Day 58.

=== Pavel ===
Pavel Chernev is an attorney and a politician. He entered the House on Day 1 and was the fifth evicted on Day 37.

=== Plamen ===
Plamen Medarov is a businessman. He is a Housemate with a secret mission and is doing tricks as assigned by Big Brother. He entered the House on Day 1 and finished fourth in the finale on Day 63.

=== Stanka ===
Stanka Zlateva is an Olympic medalist in wrestling. She entered the House on Day 1 and became a winner on Day 63.

=== Stoyko ===
Stoyko Sakaliev is a professional footballer. He entered the House on Day 2 and was the tenth evicted on Day 60.

=== Tervel ===
Tervel Pulev is a professional boxer. He entered the House on Day 2 and was the eleventh evicted on Day 60.

=== Vanya ===
Vanya Chervenkova is a businesswoman. She entered the House on Day 2 and finished third in the finale on Day 63.

=== Yoana ===
Yoana Zaharieva is a pop singer. She entered the House on Day 2 and was the sixth evicted on Day 44.

== Houseguests ==
=== Paris Hilton ===
On September 11 it was officially announced that Paris Hilton would enter the House. She landed on Sofia airport with a flight from Milan on September 16 and entered the House on Day 2 as a special Houseguest for a few days.

=== Zlatka D. ===
Zlatka Dimitrova is a Playmate model in the Bulgarian version of Playboy Playmate and a former Housemate from VIP Brother 4. She entered the House on Day 37 and stayed on the end of the show, and was the first Housemate in the second season of Big Brother All Stars which commenced on November 18.

=== Zlatka R. ===
Zlatka Raykova is a Playmate model in the Bulgarian version of Playboy Playmate. She entered the House on Day 46 and stayed on the end of the show, and was the second Housemate in Big Brother All Stars.

== Nominations table ==
	Week 1	Week 2	Week 3	Week 4	Week 5	Week 6	Week 7	Week 8	Week 9			Nominations received
	Week 1	Week 2	Week 3	Week 4	Week 5	Week 6	Week 7	Week 8	Day 60	Final		Nominations received
Stanka	Vanya, Tervel	Pavel, Ivaylo	Mira, Anna	Anna, Mira	Irina, Plamen	~~Mira~~, Irina	Irina, Mira	Stoyko, Tervel	No; Nominations	Winner (Day 63)		7
Marian	Edelweiss, ~~Plamen~~	Ivaylo, Mira	Vanya, Mira	Plamen, Stanka	Vanya, Yoana	Vanya, Stoyko	Stoyko, Mihail	Stanka, Tervel	No; Nominations	Runner-up (Day 63)		17
Vanya	Edelweiss, ~~Plamen~~	Ivaylo, Pavel	Mira, Jared	Mira, Plamen	Irina, Plamen	~~Mira~~, Marian	Mira, Plamen	Stanka, Tervel	No; Nominations	Third place (Day 63)		17
Plamen	Exempt			Stanka, Pavel	Vanya, Marian	Mira	Vanya, Mihail	Marian, Himself	No; Nominations	Fourth place (Day 63)		21
Lilyana	Ivaylo, Irina	Ivaylo, Irina	Jared, Yoana	Vanya, Marian	Irina, Stoyko	Irina, ~~Mira~~	Irina	Stanka, Marian	No; Nominations	Fifth place (Day 63)		5
Tervel	~~Plamen~~, Marian	Anna, Mira	Anna, Jared	Mira, Anna	Plamen, ~~Yoana~~	Marian, Irina	Plamen, Mira	Stanka, Himself	No; Nominations	Evicted (Day 60)		2
Stoyko	~~Plamen~~, Edelweiss	Lilyana, Pavel	Mira, Marian	Mira, Plamen	Mihail, Marian	~~Mira~~, Marian	Plamen, Mira	Stanka, Tervel	No; Nominations	Evicted (Day 60)		5
Mira	Angel, Marian	Pavel, Vanya	Vanya, Pavel	Stanka, Pavel	Yoana	Stanka, Yoana	Mihail, Vanya	Marian, Plamen	Evicted (Day 58)			25
Irina	Edelweiss, Anna	Pavel, Anna	Stanka, Plamen	Pavel, Anna	Vanya, Yoana	Lilyana, Yoana	Mihail, Marian	Lilyana, Plamen	Evicted (Day 58)			14
Mihail	~~Plamen~~, Ivaylo	Vanya, Mira	Yoana, Marian	Plamen, Yoana	Plamen, Irina	~~Mira~~, Irina	Mira, Marian	Evicted (Day 51)				7
Yoana	Anna, Ivaylo	Pavel, Lilyana	Mihail, Lilyana	Anna, Plamen	Irina, Plamen	Irina, Marian	Evicted (Day 44)					10
Pavel	Edelweiss, ~~Plamen~~	Mira, Ivaylo	Mira, Vanya	Mira, Anna	Plamen, Irina	Evicted (Day 37)						12
Anna	~~Plamen~~, Yoana	Vanya, Marian	Vanya, Marian	Stanka, Plamen	Evicted (Day 30)							10
Jared	~~Plamen~~, Yoana	Vanya, Marian	Vanya, Marian	Evicted (Day 23)								3
Ivaylo	Angel, Marian	Pavel, Vanya	Evicted (Day 16)									9
Edelweiss	Yoana, Marian	Evicted (Day 9)										5
Angel	Plamen, Ivaylo	Walked (Day 5)										2
Nomination notes	1	2	3	4	5	none		6	none			
Head of House	Stanka	Plamen (fake)	Irina	Lilyana	Mira	Plamen	Lilyana	Vanya	none			
Against public vote	Edelweiss, Ivaylo, Marian, Mihail	Ivaylo, Mira, Pavel, Yoana	Jared, Marian, Mira, Stoyko, Vanya	Anna, Mira, Plamen, Stanka, Tervel	Irina, Pavel, Plamen, Vanya, Yoana	Irina, Marian, Mihail, Yoana	Irina, Mira, Mihail, Plamen, Stanka	Irina, Lilyana, Mira, Stoyko, Vanya	All; Housemates			
Walked	none	Angel	none									
Evicted	Edelweiss; 18% to save	Ivaylo; Fewest votes to save	Jared; Fewest votes to save	Anna; Fewest votes to save	Pavel; Fewest votes to save	Yoana; 6.5% to save	Mihail; Fewest votes to save	Irina; Fewest votes (out of 4) to save	Stoyko; 23.8% (out of 3) to save	Lilyana; Fewest votes (out of 5)	Plamen; Fewest votes (out of 4)	
Evicted	Edelweiss; 18% to save	Ivaylo; Fewest votes to save	Jared; Fewest votes to save	Anna; Fewest votes to save	Pavel; Fewest votes to save	Yoana; 6.5% to save	Mihail; Fewest votes to save	Irina; Fewest votes (out of 4) to save	Stoyko; 23.8% (out of 3) to save	Vanya; Fewest votes (out of 3)	Marian; 33.2% (out of 2)	
Evicted	Edelweiss; 18% to save	Ivaylo; Fewest votes to save	Jared; Fewest votes to save	Anna; Fewest votes to save	Pavel; Fewest votes to save	Yoana; 6.5% to save	Mihail; Fewest votes to save	Mira 31.6% (out of 3) to save	Tervel; 20.1% (out of 4) to save	Vanya; Fewest votes (out of 3)	Marian; 33.2% (out of 2)	
Evicted	Edelweiss; 18% to save	Ivaylo; Fewest votes to save	Jared; Fewest votes to save	Anna; Fewest votes to save	Pavel; Fewest votes to save	Yoana; 6.5% to save	Mihail; Fewest votes to save	Mira 31.6% (out of 3) to save	Tervel; 20.1% (out of 4) to save	Stanka; 66.8% to win		

=== Notes ===
- ^Note 1: The housemates were divided in two teams, with Stanka and Misho being the captain of each team. The team of Stanka won the competition, so she's the HoH of the week. Misho was automatically nominated as losing team captain.
- ^Note 2: Stanka could give immunity to two other housemates. She gave immunity to Vanya and Tervel.
- ^Note 3: Ivaylo and Mira, and Anna and Jared nominate together.
- ^Note 4: Plamen is immune as he is doing tricks for Big Brother. It is unknown to the other housemates, so they can still nominate him.
- ^Note 5: Jared is immune as he doesn't speak Bulgarian well.
- ^Note 6: During the eighth and final nominations, the housemates had to vote for out which they wanted to win (the names in green).
