= VIP Brother season 9 =

VIP Brother
- Season 9
- Presented by: Niki Kanchev; Aleksandra Sarchadjieva; Miglena Angelova
- No. of days: 61
- No. of housemates: 18
- Winner: Yonislav Yotov - Toto
- Runner-up: Margarita

Release
- Original network: Nova Television
- Original release: 11 September – 10 November 2017

Season chronology
- ← Previous season 8 Next → season 10

VIP Brother 9, also known as Любовта е във VIP Brother (lit. Love is in the VIP Brother) was ninth season of the Bulgarian reality television series VIP Brother, hosted by Niki Kanchev. The show launched on 11 September 2017 on Nova TV. Niki Kanchev, Aleksandra Sarchadjieva and Miglena Angelova are the main presenters. It concluded 61 days later on 10 November 2017. Yonislav Yotov "Toto" won with Margarita Hranova as the runner-up.

== Housemates ==
16 housemates entered the house on Day 1. They were joined by 2 other housemates on Day 2, who were allowed by Big Brother to participate as a single contestant on Day 11.

=== Aleksandra B. ===
Aleksandra Bogdanska is a model, TV host and the former girlfriend of Daniel P. (the two later married in the house). Seven years later, she is the host of Big Brother 6. She entered the house on Day 1 and finished fourth in the finale on Day 61.

=== Aleksandra D. ===
Aleksandra Dimitrova "Aleks" is a pop singer, known for being a contestant on the second season of X Factor. She and Vladislava are twin sisters. Aleksandra D. entered the house on Day 2. The twin sisters entered the house as single contestants. On Day 8, Vladislava faced a fake eviction. She was offered by Big Brother to return to the house to perform secret missions for him with Aleks. During their secret task, it was Aleks's identity, under which they had to live - Vladi was with the other housemates, pretending to be Aleks, while Aleks was in the secret room of the house. The twins were swapping their places in the house and their task was to trick the others that they were one and the same person. If the girls failed with their assigned task, they would be immediately evicted from the show. Aleksandra D. and Vladislava failed with their secret mission. Despite that, Big Brother let them stay in the house and they were given the opportunity to compete as a single contestant. The twins are the first housemates of the season to be evicted, on Day 15.

=== Alfredo ===
Alfredo Tores is a dancer and choreographеr. He entered the house on Day 1 and was the sixth evicted on Day 50.

=== Angie ===
Angie Kassabie is a nutritionist. She was born in Lebanon. She entered the house on Day 1 and was the tenth evicted on Day 59.

=== Anton ===
Anton Stefanov is a journalist. He entered the house on Day 1 and was the third evicted on Day 29.

=== Boris ===
Boris Petrov is a famous cook. He entered the house on Day 1 and was the eighth evicted on Day 57.

=== Danail ===
Danail Milev "Dani" is a pop singer, musician, composer and lyricist. He entered the house on Day 1 and was the second evicted on Day 22.

=== Daniel P. ===
Daniel Petkanov is a reporter of the Nova TV show "Chasat na Milen Tsvetkov" ("Milen Tsvetkov's Hour") and the former boyfriend of Aleksandra B. (the two later married in the house). He entered the house on Day 1 and was the eleventh evicted on Day 59.

=== Daniel Z. ===
Daniel Zlatkov is a footballer who plays as a defender for Shakhtyor Soligorsk in the Belarusian Premier League. He is also known as the Bulgarian version of Ronaldo, because he looks like the famous footballer. He entered the house on Day 1 and was the seventh evicted on Day 57.

=== Djuliana ===
Djuliana Gani is a model and the winner of the title "Miss Silicone 2013". She entered the house on Day 1 and finished fifth in the finale on Day 61.

=== Margarita ===
Margarita Hranova is a famous pop singer. She entered the house on Day 1 and finished second in the finale on Day 61.

=== Maria ===
Maria Kirova is a pop-folk singer. She entered the house on Day 1 and decided to walk out of the house on Day 22.

=== Miglena ===
Miglena Kakanasheva "Megz" is a fashion designer. She is also known for being a contestant on the reality show The Mole 1. She entered the house on Day 1 and finished third in the finale on Day 61.

=== Sashka ===
Sashka Vaseva is a pop-folk singer. She entered the house on Day 1 and was the ninth evicted on Day 59.

=== Tsvetelin ===
Tsvetelin Marinov "Tsuni" is a businessman. He entered the house on Day 1 and was the fourth evicted on Day 36.

=== Vanya ===
Vanya Shtereva is an actress, singer and writer. She entered the house on Day 1 and was the fifth evicted on Day 43.

=== Vladislava ===
Vladislava Dimitrova "Vladi" is a pop singer, known for being a contestant on the second season of X Factor. She and Aleksandra D. are twin sisters. Vladislava entered the house on Day 2. The twin sisters entered the house as single contestants. On Day 8, Vladi faced a fake eviction. She was offered by Big Brother to return to the house to perform secret missions for him with Aleks. During their secret task, it was Aleks's identity, under which they had to live - Vladi was with the other housemates, pretending to be Aleks, while Aleks was in the secret room of the house. The twins were swapping their places in the house and their task was to trick the others that they were one and the same person. If the girls failed with their assigned task, they would be immediately evicted from the show. Aleksandra D. and Vladislava failed with their secret mission. Despite that, Big Brother let them stay in the house and they were given the opportunity to compete as a single contestant. The twins became the first housemate to be evicted on Day 15.

=== Yonislav ===
Yonislav Yotov "Toto" is a rap and R&B singer and YouTuber. He is also known as the member of the R&B and rap duet Skandau. He entered the house on Day 1 and became the winner on Day 61.

== Nominations table ==
	Week 1	Week 2	Week 3	Week 4	Week 5	Week 6	Week 7	Week 8	Week 9	Final		Nominations received
Yonislav	The Orden of the Heart	Anton, Boris	Angie, Boris	Sashka, Anton	Miglena	Sashka, ~~Boris~~	Boris, ~~Alfredo~~	Daniel P., Boris	No; Nominations	Winner (Day 61)		13
Margarita	Not eligible	Maria, Miglena	Daniel Z., Miglena	~~Daniel Z.,~~; ~~Miglena~~	Miglena	Miglena, ~~Daniel Z.~~	Dzhuliana, Alfredo	Daniel P., Daniel Z.	No; Nominations	Runner-up (Day 61)		5
Miglena	Not eligible	Dzhuliana, Aleksandra D.	Tsvetelin, Maria	Dzhuliana, Sashka	Yonislav	Angie, Yonislav	Exempt	Herself, Daniel P.	No; Nominations	Third place (Day 61)		24
Aleksandra B.	The Orden of the Heart	Sashka, Boris	Tsvetelin, Sashka	Tsvetelin, Sashka	Sashka	Angie, ~~Boris~~	Boris, Alfredo	Dzhuliana, Boris	No; Nominations	Fourth place (Day 61)		2
Dzhuliana	Not eligible	Miglena, Boris	Danail, Sashka	Vanya, ~~Miglena~~	Miglena	~~Daniel Z.~~, Alfredo	Margarita, Boris	Daniel P., Yonislav	No; Nominations	Fifth place (Day 61)		6
Daniel P.	Not eligible	Anton, Danail	Daniel Z., Sashka	~~Daniel Z.~~, Yonislav	Tsvetelin	Yonislav, ~~Daniel Z.~~	Alfredo, Yonislav	Aleksandra B., Yonislav	No; Nominations	Evicted (Day 59)		3
Angie	The Orden of the Heart	Miglena, Aleksandra B.	Boris, Miglena	Vanya, ~~Miglena~~	Miglena	Miglena, Alfredo	Boris, Alfredo	Margarita, Boris	No; Nominations	Evicted (Day 59)		5
Sashka	Nominated	Miglena, Yonislav	Daniel Z., Yonislav	~~Miglena~~, Vanya	Tsvetelin	Margarita, Vanya	Boris, Dzhuliana	Aleksandra B., Yonislav	No; Nominations	Evicted (Day 59)		17
Boris	Not eligible	Anton, Dzhuliana	Vanya, Angie	Exempt	Tsvetelin	Yonislav, ~~Daniel Z.~~	Daniel Z., Yonislav	Daniel P., Daniel Z.	Evicted (Day 57)			25
Daniel Z.	The Orden of the Heart	Sashka, Miglena	Sashka, Boris	Dzhuliana, Margarita	Boris	~~Boris~~, Vanya	Boris, Margarita	Margarita, Boris	Evicted (Day 57)			12
Alfredo	Not eligible	Anton, Aleksandra D.	Vanya, Anton	Tsvetelin, Vanya	~~Daniel P.~~	Angie, Daniel P.	Aleksandra B., Daniel P.	Evicted (Day 50)				10
Vanya	Not eligible	Alfredo, Miglena	Boris, Danail	Sashka, Anton	Boris	~~Boris~~, Alfredo	Evicted (Day 43)					10
Tsvetelin	Not eligible	Miglena, Anton	Miglena, Sashka	~~Miglena~~, Sashka	Miglena	Evicted (Day 36)						7
Anton	Not eligible	Boris, Aleksandra D.	Alfredo, Danail	Yonislav, Alfredo	Evicted (Day 29)							9
Danail	Not eligible	Anton, Vanya	Vanya, Maria	Evicted (Day 22)								4
Maria	Nominated	Miglena, Boris	Margarita, Sashka	Walked (Day 22)								4
Aleksandra D.	Nominated	Sashka, Miglena	Evicted (Day 15)									5
Vladislava	Nominated	Nominated	Evicted (Day 15)									2
Nomination notes	1, 2	2, 3	none	4, 5	6, 7	8	9, 10	11	12			
Against public vote	Aleksandra D., Maria, Sashka, Vladislava	Aleksandra D. & Vladislava, Anton, Boris, Miglena	Boris, Danail, Daniel Z., Miglena, Sashka, Vanya	Anton, Dzhuliana, Sashka, Tsvetelin, Vanya, Yonislav	Boris, Miglena, Tsvetelin	Alfredo, Angie, Miglena, Vanya, Yonislav	Alfredo, Boris, Dzhuliana, Margarita, Yonislav	Boris, Daniel Z., Yonislav	All; Housemates			
Walked	none		Maria	none								
Evicted	Vladislava; Fewest votes to save	Aleksandra D. & Vladislava; Fewest votes to save	Danail; Fewest votes to save	Anton; 1.8% to save	Tsvetelin; Fewest votes to save	Vanya; Fewest votes to save	Alfredo; Fewest votes to save	Daniel Z. Fewest votes to save	Sashka; Fewest votes (out of 8)	Dzhuliana; Fewest votes (out of 5)	Aleksandra B. Fewest votes (out of 4)	
Evicted	Vladislava; Fewest votes to save	Aleksandra D. & Vladislava; Fewest votes to save	Danail; Fewest votes to save	Anton; 1.8% to save	Tsvetelin; Fewest votes to save	Vanya; Fewest votes to save	Alfredo; Fewest votes to save	Boris; Fewest votes to save	Angie; Fewest votes (out of 7)	Miglena; Fewest votes (out of 3)	Margarita; 42.3% (out of 2)	
Evicted	Vladislava; Fewest votes to save	Aleksandra D. & Vladislava; Fewest votes to save	Danail; Fewest votes to save	Anton; 1.8% to save	Tsvetelin; Fewest votes to save	Vanya; Fewest votes to save	Alfredo; Fewest votes to save	Boris; Fewest votes to save	Daniel P. Fewest votes (out of 6)	Yonislav; 57.7% to win		

=== Notes ===
- ^Note 1 : On Day 2, the twin sisters Aleksandra D. and Vladislava entered the house. Aleksandra B. and Yonislav were given a mission by Big Brother to recognize them as the newly welcomed housemates. They completed their task successfully, which meant that the twin sisters were automatically nominated for eviction. Aleksandra B. and Yonislav were part of "The Order of the Heart" along with Angie and Daniel Z. who won the first-week mission. Maria and Sashka were nominated after the decision of "The Order of the Heart".
- ^Note 2 : On Day 8, there was a fake eviction of which the housemates were unaware about. Vladislava received the fewest votes to save and therefore she was invited by Big Brother to return to the house to perform secret missions for him with her twin sister. During their secret task, it was Aleks's identity, under which they had to live - Vladi was with the other housemates, pretending to be Aleks, while Aleks was in the secret room of the house. The twins were swapping their places in the house and their task was to trick the others that they were the same person. Eventually, Vladislava was exempt from the nominations during the second week, while Aleks was eligible to nominate. If the girls failed with their assigned task, they would be immediately evicted from the show.
- ^Note 3 : On Day 11, it was revealed that Aleksandra D. and Vladislava had failed with their secret mission. Despite that, Big Brother let them stay in the house and they were given the opportunity to compete as a single contestant. However, due to the failure in their secret mission, they were directly up for eviction along with Anton, Boris and Miglena.
- ^Note 4 : Boris was immune and he couldn't nominate during the fourth nominations. The other housemates couldn't nominate him as well.
- ^Note 5 : This time, the housemates were eligible to nominate only one housemate instead of two. Originally, 8 out of 14 housemates were nominated and those housemates were Anton, Daniel Z., Dzhuliana, Miglena, Sashka, Tsvetelin and Vanya. Miglena, who had the role of an executive director during the new weekly mission "BBTV", was eligible to save two of the nominated housemates from the possible eviction. She chose to save Daniel Z. and herself.
- ^Note 6 : The fifth nominations were face-to-face. The housemates were obliged to nominate only one housemate and everyone who received at least one nomination faced eviction.
- ^Note 7 : Alfredo's nomination to Daniel P. was voided because he didn't give a reason to nominate him.
- ^Note 8 : Originally, 7 out of 12 housemates were nominated and those housemates were Alfredo, Boris, Daniel Z., Angie, Miglena, Vanya and Yonislav. As Aleksandra B. and Daniel P. were planning a marriage in the house, they were the lucky housemates who had the opportunity to save two of the nominees. A "wheel of luck" was introduced which featured the 7 nominated housemates. The wheel was spun by Aleksandra and Daniel and it revealed Boris and Daniel Z. as the two saved housemates from the sixth eviction.
- ^Note 9 : Miglena was immune and she couldn't nominate during the seventh nominations. The other housemates couldn't nominate her as well.
- ^Note 10 : Yonislav's nomination to Alfredo was voided because he didn't give a reason to nominate him.
- ^Note 11 : During the eighth and final nominations, the housemates had to choose the housemate they wanted to win (the name in green) and the housemate who they didn't want to win (the name in black). They were able to vote for themselves.
- ^Note 12 : The public were voting to win rather than to save.
