= VIP Brother season 8 =

VIP Brother
- Season 8
- Presented by: Niki Kanchev; Aleksandra Sarchadjieva
- No. of days: 62
- No. of housemates: 19
- Winner: Miglena Angelova
- Runner-up: Petar

Release
- Original network: Nova Television
- Original release: 11 September – 11 November 2016

Series chronology
- ← Previous season 7 Next → season 9

VIP Brother 8, also known as VIP Brother: Играта загрубява (lit. The game gets rough), was the eighth season of the Bulgarian reality television series VIP Brother, hosted by Niki Kanchev. The show launched on 11 September 2016 on Nova TV. Niki Kanchev and Aleksandra Sarchadjieva were the main presenters. It concluded 62 days later on 11 November 2016. Miglena Angelova won with Petar Bachvarov "Uti" as the runner-up.

It marked 10 years since the premiere of the VIP Brother format in Bulgaria in 2006.

== Housemates ==
17 Housemates entered the House on Day 1 and another one on Day 13. Hristo entered on Day 30.

=== Aleksandar ===
Aleksandar Nikolov "Alek Sandar" is a music producer and musician. He entered the house on Day 1 and was the first evicted on Day 13.

=== Borislav ===
Borislav Komsiyski is a businessman. He entered the house on Day 1 and finished fourth in the finale on Day 62.

=== Desislava ===
Desislava Tsoneva "Desi" is a TV host and daughter of popular journalist Dimitar Tsonev. She entered the house on Day 1 and was the eighth evicted on Day 55.

=== Emilia ===
Emilia Tsvetkova "Emanuela" is a pop-folk singer. She entered the house on Day 13 and finished third in the finale on Day 62.

=== Georgi S. ===
Georgi Sofkin is an Olympic champion in badminton. He entered the house on Day 1 and decided to walk out of the House on Day 9.

=== Georgi T. ===
Georgi Tornev is a director of popular shows on BNT Ku-ku and Kanaleto. His wife Mira Dobreva entered two years later in VIP Brother 10 in 2018. He entered the house on Day 1 and was the sixth evicted on Day 48.

=== Gloria ===
Gloria Petkova is a model. She entered the house on Day 1 and was the second evicted on Day 34.

=== Hristo ===
Hristo Zhivkov is an actor. He entered the house on Day 30 and finished fifth in the finale on Day 62.

=== Irina ===
Irina Tencheva is a TV host and wife of popular TV host and producer Ivan Hristov. She entered the house on Day 1 and was the ninth evicted on Day 58.

=== Lazara ===
Lazara Zlatareva "Kaka Lara" (Sister Lara) is a TV host of popular childer show "Milion i edno zhelania" ("Million and one wishes") and an actress. She entered the house on Day 1 and was the third evicted on Day 41.

=== Lilia ===
Lilia Vuchkova "Kaka Lili" (Sister Lili) is a TV host of popular childer shows "Sedem dni za vas deca" ("Seven days for your children"), "Muzikalna chudnoteka" ("Music chudnoteka"), "Nedelno mejduchasie" ("Sunday break") and original TV host of "Milion i edno zhelania" ("Million and one wishes") and an actress. She entered the house on Day 1 and was the tenth evicted on Day 58.

=== Miglena ===
Miglena Angelova is a TV host of former popular talk show "Iskreno i lichno" ("Sincerely and personally"). She entered the house on Day 1 and became a winner on Day 62.

=== Nadezhda ===
Nadezhda Ivanova "Nadya" is an actress and TV host of former secular show on BNT "Elit". She entered the house on Day 1 and was the seventh evicted on Day 55.

=== Petar ===
Petar Bachvarov "Uti" is a TV host of first culinary show "Barzo, lesno, vkusno" ("Fast, easy, delicious") started in 1997 and an actor. He entered the house on Day 1 and finished second in the finale on Day 62.

=== Radoslav ===
Radoslav Kavaldzhiev "Roro" is a producer, TV host a defunct music channel MM and son of the popular rock singer Vili Kavaldzhiev. He entered the house on Day 1 and was the fifth evicted on Day 48.

=== Reni ===
Reni Gaytandjieva is a pop-folk singer. She is the only pop-folk singer managed to break into two countries - Bulgaria and Serbia. She entered the house on Day 1 and was the twelfth evicted on Day 61.

=== Valentin ===
Valentin Mihov "Valyo" is a former footballer, football functionary and businessman. He entered the house on Day 1 and was the eleventh evicted on Day 60.

=== Yavor ===
Yavor Baharov is an actor. He entered the house on Day 1 and was ejected on Day 27.

=== Zhana ===
Zhana Brankova-Bergendorff is a pop singer and the winner of second season of X Factor. She entered the house on Day 1 and was the fourth evicted on Day 41.

== Houseguests ==
=== Mike ===
On September 10 it was officially announced that Mike Tyson would enter the House. On September 26, Niki Kanchev announced that it would enter the house. He entered the House on Day 23 as a special Houseguest and left on Day 26.

== Nominations table ==
	Week 1	Week 2	Week 3	Week 4	Week 5	Week 6	Week 7	Week 8	Final		Nominations received
Miglena	Lilia, Reni	Georgi T., Irina	Borislav, Radoslav	Irina	Irina, Petar	Petar, Radoslav	Emilia, Irina	No; Nominations	Winner (Day 62)		34
Petar	Lilia, Radoslav	Lilia, Borislav	Borislav, Emilia	Emilia	Emilia, Zhana	Radoslav, ~~Emilia~~	Irina, Borislav	No; Nominations	Runner-up (Day 62)		7
Emilia	Not in house	Exempt	Petar, Gloria	Lazara	Petar, Lazara	Petar, Irina	Miglena, Hristo	No; Nominations	Third place (Day 62)		19
Borislav	Lilia, Lazara	Lilia, Georgi T.	Zhana, Lazara	~~Zhana~~	Lazara, Zhana	Petar, Valentin	Miglena, Irina	No; Nominations	Fourth place (Day 62)		15
Hristo	Not in House			Exempt	Miglena, Emilia	~~Miglena~~, ~~Emilia~~	Irina, Emilia	No; Nominations	Fifth place (Day 62)		3
Reni	Miglena, Aleksandar	Lilia, Miglena	Lazara, Irina	Nadezhda	Lazara, Georgi T.	Georgi T., Nadezhda	Valentin, Emilia	No; Nominations	Evicted (Day 61)		7
Valentin	Aleksandar, Miglena	Lilia, Miglena	Borislav, Emilia	~~Miglena~~	Miglena, Borislav	~~Miglena~~, Radoslav	Hristo, Borislav	No; Nominations	Evicted (Day 60)		2
Lilia	Miglena, Valentin	Radoslav, Georgi T.	Miglena, Borislav	~~2-Miglena~~	Miglena, Borislav	Borislav, Nadezhda	Irina, Hristo	No; Nominations	Evicted (Day 58)		16
Irina	Miglena, Aleksandar	Miglena, Zhana	Reni, Miglena	~~Miglena~~	Miglena, Zhana	Borislav, ~~Emilia~~	Petar, Emilia	No; Nominations	Evicted (Day 58)		9
Desislava	Lilia, Miglena	Yavor, Zhana	Zhana, Emilia	Georgi T.	Miglena, Zhana	Georgi T., ~~Miglena~~	Petar, Hristo	Evicted (Day 55)			5
Nadezhda	Lilia, Georgi T.	Lilia, Gloria	Zhana, Yavor	Emilia	Zhana, Miglena	Borislav, Georgi T.	Petar, Emilia	Evicted (Day 55)			4
Georgi T.	Lilia, Miglena	Radoslav, Yavor	Reni, Emilia	Emilia	Miglena, Emilia	~~Miglena~~, ~~Emilia~~	Evicted (Day 48)				13
Radoslav	Lilia, Miglena	Georgi T., Miglena	Yavor, Zhana	~~Miglena~~	Miglena, Zhana	Petar, ~~Miglena~~	Evicted (Day 48)				7
Zhana	Gloria, Desislava	Desislava, Gloria	Yavor, Borislav	Gloria	Georgi T., Irina	Evicted (Day 41)					18
Lazara	Reni, Aleksandar	Borislav, Reni	Emilia, Borislav	~~Miglena~~	Miglena, Zhana	Evicted (Day 41)					8
Gloria	Georgi T., Aleksandar	Zhana, Lilia	Zhana, Miglena	~~Zhana~~	Evicted (Day 34)						6
Yavor	Desislava, Lilia	Lilia, Desislava	Zhana, Reni	Ejected (Day 27)							5
Aleksandar	Lilia, Georgi T.	Evicted (Day 13)									5
Georgi S.	Walked (Day 9)										0
Notes	1	2	3	4, 5	none	6	7, 8	none			
Against public vote	Aleksandar, Lilia, Miglena	Georgi T., Lilia, Miglena, Zhana	Borislav, Emilia, Miglena, Reni, ~~Yavor~~, Zhana	Gloria, Emilia, Irina, Lazara	Emilia, Lazara, Miglena, Zhana	Borislav, Georgi T., Petar, Radoslav	Borislav, Desislava, Emilia, Hristo, Nadezhda, Reni	All; Housemates			
Walked	Georgi S.	none									
Ejected	none		Yavor	none							
Evicted	Aleksandar; Fewest votes to save	Miglena; Fewest votes to save	Eviction cancelled	Gloria; Fewest votes to save	Lazara; Fewest votes to save	Radoslav; Fewest votes to save	Nadezhda; Fewest votes to save	Irina; Fewest votes (out of 9)	Valentin; Fewest votes (out of 7)	Reni; Fewest votes (out of 6)	
Evicted	Aleksandar; Fewest votes to save	Lilia; Fewest votes to save	Eviction cancelled	Gloria; Fewest votes to save	Lazara; Fewest votes to save	Radoslav; Fewest votes to save	Nadezhda; Fewest votes to save	Irina; Fewest votes (out of 9)	Hristo; Fewest votes (out of 5)	Borislav; Fewest votes (out of 4)	
Evicted	Aleksandar; Fewest votes to save	Georgi T. Fewest votes to save	Eviction cancelled	Gloria; Fewest votes to save	Zhana; Fewest votes to save	Georgi T. Fewest votes to save	Desislava; Fewest votes to save	Lilia; Fewest votes (out of 8)	Emilia; Fewest votes (out of 3)	Petar; 48.2% (out of 2)	
Evicted	Aleksandar; Fewest votes to save	Georgi T. Fewest votes to save	Eviction cancelled	Gloria; Fewest votes to save	Zhana; Fewest votes to save	Georgi T. Fewest votes to save	Desislava; Fewest votes to save	Lilia; Fewest votes (out of 8)	Miglena; 51.8% to win		

=== Notes ===
- ^Note 1: Initially, Borislav and Yavor were nominated by the mission of Zhana "Secret boss of the house, but after the end, they are immunized from nominations (including Zhana, who cope successfully with the mission).
- ^Note 2: For the first time nominations are held by voting on Facebook.
- ^Note 3: Eviction was cancelled after having Yavor decides to leave the house on his own.
- ^Note 4: For the first time nominations are held a completely new regulation for transmission in which luck plays a major role and housemates in pairs of two or three. Lilia is immune at the end of the show and it makes sure the first finalist. She is the only housemate who gave 2 points between the nominations.
- ^Note 5: Miglena and Zhana were originally nominated, but after the sector fell "save and nominate another" they were saved from the nominations and had to indicate another participant from outside the list of nominees. Emilia stayed in the nomination because it fell on the sector "nominated" and she had to nominate another participant outside the list of the nominees.
- ^Note 6: Initially Emilia and Miglena were nominated, but after voting on Facebook they gathered most like-es of their photos and they were saved.
- ^Note 7: During the seventh and final nominations, the housemates had to first vote for who they wanted to win (the name in green) and second for who they didn't want to win (the name in black). They were not able to vote for themselves.
- ^Note 8: During the last nominations for the season Desislava, Nadezhda and Reni did not receive any support from other participants (or "most worthy" or "most unworthy" to win the show) and were nominated participants who are most unworthy to win.
