= Big Brother All Stars 2012 =

Season of television series

- Season 1
- Presented by: Niki Kanchev; Aleksandra Sarchadjieva
- No. of days: 29
- No. of housemates: 11
- Winner: Nikola Nasteski - Lester
- Runner-up: Nayden

Release
- Original network: Nova Television
- Original release: 19 November – 17 December 2012

Season chronology
- Next → Season 2

Big Brother All-Stars was the first season of the All-Star spin-off of Big Brother and the tenth season of the Big Brother format in Bulgaria overall and featured housemates from previous seasons of the show, as well as from other reality formats such as Music Idol, Survivor and X Factor. The all-star edition commenced on 19 November 2012 on Nova Television right after the fourth-season finale of VIP Brother and lasted for a total of 29 days, ended on 17 December 2012. Together with VIP Brother 1 it holds the record for shortest season of the format in Bulgaria so far. Nikola Nasteski "Lester" won with Nayden Naydenov "Ned" as the runner-up.

As in the first two seasons of VIP Brother, nominations and evictions took place twice a week. The winner, Nikola, received a car.

== Production ==
=== Pre-season ===
On 27 March 2012, Endemol announced that a deal with Nova TV had been finalized for another two seasons of the show to be aired. On 10 June 2012, Nova TV confirmed that VIP Brother 4 would commence in September and that an all-star edition of Big Brother would be aired directly after the finale at the end of 2012.

=== Logo ===
The official logo used was the same as the one for the thirteenth British series. This logo was also used in the previous season, VIP Brother 4.

== Housemates ==
10 housemates entered the house on Day 1, including the triplets.

=== Aleksandra ===
Aleksandra Apostolova "Sanny Alexa" was a contestant from X Factor 1 where she finished third. She entered the house on Day 1 and was the first evicted on Day 8.

=== Borislav ===
Borislav Borisov was a contestant from Big Brother 3. He entered the house on Day 1 and finished third in the finale on Day 29.

=== Cece ===
Cece Oreshkova was a contestant from the Macedonian reality show Fashion Stage. She is from Negotino, Macedonia and entered the house on Day 1 and was the sixth evicted on Day 27.

=== Dimitar ===
Dimitar Kazalov "Dimi" was a contestant from Big Brother 1. He entered the house on Day 1 and walked on Day 20.

=== Lilyana ===
Lilyana Angelova was a contestant from Big Brother 3 where she finished third. She entered the house on Day 1 and was the fifth evicted on Day 24.

=== Miroslav ===
Miroslav Atanasov was a contestant from Big Brother 2 where he won. He entered the house on Day 1 and was the fourth evicted on Day 24.

=== Nayden ===
Nayden Naydenov "Ned" was a contestant from Big Brother 1 and VIP Dance. He entered the house on Day 1 and finished second in the finale on Day 29.

=== Nikola ===
Nikola Nasteski "Lester" was a contestant in the former Yugoslavian regional edition of the format called Veliki Brat 4. He is Model/Stripper from Skopje and entered the house on Day 1 and became a winner on Day 29.

=== Panayot ===
Panayot Kyuchukov "Patso" was a contestant from Big Brother 3. He entered the house on Day 1. He faced a fake eviction on Day 3 when he entered the Secret Room. Panayot returned to the house on Day 8, but was the second evicted on Day 15.

=== Stoyka ===
Stoyka Stefanova was a contestant from Big Brother 1. She entered the house on Day 1 and finished fourth in the finale on Day 29.

=== The Triplets ===
On October 22, 2012 it was announced that the triplets from Big Brother 3 would return to participate in this season. Lyubov is the winner of the third season. Vyara, Nadezhda, and Lyubov (known collectively as 'The Triplets') were the third evicted on Day 22 with 83.5% of the votes to evict; Elena from Big Brother 2 is the only housemate so far in the history of the Big Brother format in Bulgaria to receive a higher percentage of votes to evict.

== Houseguests ==
=== Stoyan ===
Stoyan Dudov was a fan of the show who was chosen by the viewers to enter the house, as announced before the beginning of the season. He entered the house as a houseguest on Day 10 and left on Day 15.

== Nominations table ==
	Day 3	Week 1	Week 2	Week 3	Final		Nominations received
Nikola	Dimitar, Stoyka	Stoyka, Dimitar	Borislav, Dimitar	Dimitar, Stoyka	Winner (Day 29)		6
Nayden	Cece, Aleksandra	Cece, Stoyka	Cece, Stoyka	Lilyana, Stoyka	Runner-up (Day 29)		5
Borislav	Panayot, Cece	Aleksandra, Cece	The Triplets, Panayot	The Triplets, Lilyana	Third place (Day 29)		2
Stoyka	Aleksandra, Panayot	Nikola, Aleksandra	Nikola, Panayot	The Triplets, Lilyana	Fourth place (Day 29)		20
Cece	Nayden, Dimitar	Stoyka, Nayden	Panayot, Nayden	Stoyka, Dimitar	Evicted (Day 27)		6
Lilyana	Panayot, Nikola	Miroslav, Aleksandra	Panayot, Miroslav	Cece, Nayden	Evicted (Day 24)		6
Miroslav	Stoyka, Panayot	Stoyka, Lilyana	Panayot, Stoyka	Dimitar, Stoyka	Evicted (Day 24)		6
The Triplets	Dimitar, Nayden	Stoyka, Aleksandra	Stoyka, Dimitar	Stoyka, Borislav	Evicted (Day 22)		4
Dimitar	Nikola, Panayot	Nikola, Miroslav	Nikola, The Triplets	Miroslav, Lilyana	Walked (Day 20)		9
Panayot	Stoyka, Aleksandra	Stoyka, Miroslav	Stoyka, Miroslav	Evicted (Day 15)			11
Aleksandra	Panayot, Stoyka	Stoyka, Lilyana	Evicted (Day 8)				7
Nomination notes	1	2	none		3		
Against public vote	Aleksandra, Dimitar, Panayot, Stoyka	Aleksandra, Miroslav, Stoyka	Dimitar, Miroslav, Nikola, Panayot, Stoyka, The Triplets	~~Dimitar,~~; Lilyana, Stoyka, The Triplets	All; Housemates		
Walked	none			Dimitar	none		
Evicted	Panayot; 45.2% to fake evict	Aleksandra; Most votes to evict	Panayot; Most votes to evict	The Triplets; 83.5% to evict	Miroslav; 5.7% (out of 7)	Lilyana; 14.8% (out of 6)	
Evicted	Panayot; 45.2% to fake evict	Aleksandra; Most votes to evict	Panayot; Most votes to evict	The Triplets; 83.5% to evict	Cece; Fewest votes (out of 5)	Stoyka; Fewest votes (out of 4)	
Evicted	Panayot; 45.2% to fake evict	Aleksandra; Most votes to evict	Panayot; Most votes to evict	The Triplets; 83.5% to evict	Borislav; Fewest votes (out of 3)	Nayden; Fewest votes (out of 2)	
Evicted	Panayot; 45.2% to fake evict	Aleksandra; Most votes to evict	Panayot; Most votes to evict	The Triplets; 83.5% to evict	Nikola; Most votes to win		

=== Notes ===
- ^Note 1 : This week there was a fake eviction of which the housemates were unaware. Panayot received the most votes to fake evict and therefore he was invited by Big Brother to return to the house to perform secret missions for him whilst living in a Secret Room for the following week, immune from elimination. Panayot accepted the invitation.
- ^Note 2 : The Triplets could nominate but could not be nominated after winning immunity in a previous competition this week. Panayot could also nominate but not be nominated as he was staying in the Secret Room.
- ^Note 3 : From Day 24 through till Day 27, there were no nominations. Instead, each of the remaining housemates faced the public vote to win throughout this period, with the housemate with the fewest votes to win being evicted. On Day 24, a double eviction took place.
