= Skandau =

Bulgarian rap duo

- Origin: Bulgaria
- Genres: Rap
- Years active: 2010 – present
- Members: Lachezar Evtimov (Lacho); Yonislav Yotov (ToTo); Ruslan Ignatov (Ruslan); Orhan Boshnakov (Orhan); Petar Kostov (Bate Pesho); Marin Radulov (DJ Mati); Dulislav Dulev (Duli)
- Website: www.skandau.com

Skandau (stylized as SkandaU) (Bulgarian: СкандаУ) are a Bulgarian rap duo composed of Lachezar Evtimov (Bulgarian: Лъчезар Евтимов) and Yonislav Yotov (ToTo) (Bulgarian: Йонислав Йотов).

== Career ==
The duo was created in 2010 by Lachezar Evtimov and Yonislav Yotov, both ex-footballers who decided to start a music career. Their first single Bread & Salt (Hlyab i Sol) was released in 2011. In 2012 they participated in the second season of Bulgaria's Got Talent where they reached the quarter finals. In 2013, after the success of their single Kush Kush they were the opening act of the Rick Rock concert in Plovdiv.

On 3 December 2016 they released their single Replay. The song currently runs over 10 million views on YouTube (Replay on Youtube). On 30 March 2017 they presented their collaboration song with VenZy - Sixth Sense (Shesto Chuvstvo). On May 10, 2017 they announced their song Mafia along with a month long tour by the same name.

They won the BG Radio Award for Best Bulgarian Band Of The Year in 2017 and 2018.

On 6th of April 2019 they did a concert in Armeets_Arena.

== Members ==
=== Lachezar Evtimov ===
Lachezar Evtimov- (Лъчо) was born on 29 November 1992 in Kyustendil.

=== Yonislav Yotov ===
Yonislav Yotov-Toto was born on 29 June 1991 in Vratsa. He played in the football youth formations of Botev Vratsa and also Levski Sofia. In 2017 Toto entered the 9th season of the VIP Brother TV show. He won VIP Brother in 2017. He was studying in school №44 at the age from 7 to 18.

== Discography ==
Charting singles
Title	Year	Peak chart positions	Album
Title	Year	BUL	Album
Replay	2016	39	Non-album single
"Shesto Chuvstvo" feat. VenZy	2017	8	Non-album single
"Bez da pie"	2018	4	Non-album single
"Hayvera"	2018	18	Non-album single
"No" (with Charlie Tanev)	2018	13	Non-album single
"Spomen Ot Rana"	2019	7	Non-album single
"—" denotes a recording that did not chart or was not released in that territory.

=== Other songs ===
- Hlyab I Sol (2011)
- Act-Wow (2012)
- TV I Radio (2012)
- Kush Kush (2013)
- Ot Iuni Do Avgust (feat. Deo) (2013)
- Ritamu (2013)
- Do Moreto (2014)
- Angeli I Demoni (2015)
- Zhiotno (with Liyubo) (2015)
- Reality (with Svetozar Hristov) (2015)
- Iskam Az (2015)
- Karambol (feat. Deo, Leo & Igrata) (2016)
- Mafia (2017)
- Kokaina (2018)
- Bez da pie (2018)
- Ale, ale (2020)
