= VIP Brother season 7 =

2015 season of television series

VIP Brother
- Season 7
- Presented by: Niki Kanchev; Aleksandra Sarchadjieva
- No. of days: 62
- No. of housemates: 16
- Winner: Gino Biancalana
- Runner-up: Ernestina Shinova

Release
- Original network: Nova Television
- Original release: 13 September – 13 November 2015

Series chronology
- ← Previous season 6 Next → season 8

VIP Brother 7, also known as VIP Brother: 100% напудрен (lit. 100% powdered) was the seventh season of the Bulgarian reality television series VIP Brother, hosted by Niki Kanchev. The show launched on 13 September 2015 on Nova TV. Niki Kanchev and Aleksandra Sarchadjieva were the main presenters. The commentators this season were actor Ivan Laskin, Miss Bulgaria 2009 Antonia Petrova, Miss Bulgaria 1995 and VIP Brother 6 contestant Evgenia Kalkandjieva and PR expert and VIP Brother 6 contestant Evgeni Minchev.

The season concluded 62 days later on 13 November 2015. Gino Biancalana won with Ernestina Shinova as the runner-up.

== Housemates ==
13 Housemates entered the House on Day 1. They were joined by 3 other Housemates on Day 2.

Name	Age on entry	Notability	Hometown	Day entered	Day exited	Status
Gino Biancalana	33	Businessman	Sofia	2	62	Winner
Ernestina Shinova	52	Actress	Sofia	1	62	Runner-up
Kichka Bodurova	59	Pop Singer	Burgas	1	62	Third Place
Stanimir Gumov	41	Actor	Stara Zagora	1	62	Fourth Place
Katya Mihaylova & Zdravko Zhelyazkov "Duet Riton"	57 & 62	Pop Duet	Sofia & Momchilgrad	1	62	Fifth Place
Lyudmil Ilarionov	41	Director, Pop & Pop-folk Singer	Dobrich	1	60	Eliminated
Kristina Dimitrova	55	Pop Singer	Sofia	2	60	Eliminated
Svetlana Vasileva	27	Model	Turgovishte	1	58	Eliminated
Ivo Tanev	49	TV Host, Opera & Pop-folk Singer	Sofia	1	51	Eliminated
Katrin Vacheva	32	Model	Sofia	2	44	Eliminated
Luna Yordanova	44	Pop-folk Singer	Shumen	1	37	Eliminated
Monika Valerieva	25	Model	Dupnitsa	1	30	Eliminated
Deyan Topalski	32	Sportsman, MMA Fighter	Pleven	1	23	Eliminated
Preslava	31	Pop-folk Singer	Dobrich	1	18	Walked
Djordjano	29	Amateur Artist	Stara Zagora	1	16	Eliminated
Plamen Bogdanov	22	Fitness Instructor	Pazardzhik	1	9	Eliminated

=== Deyan ===
Deyan Topalski is a sportsman. He entered the house on Day 1 and was the third evicted on Day 23.

=== Djordjano ===
Djordjano (born Miroslav Stoyanov) is an amateur artist and songwriter, gained considerable popularity on the Internet with unconventional performances posted on YouTube. He entered the house on Day 1 and was the second evicted on Day 16.

=== Ernestina ===
Ernestina Shinova is an actress. Her husband Andrey Slabakov entered the VIP Brother 3 in 2009 as a guest star. She entered the house on Day 1 and finished second in the finale on Day 62.

=== Gino ===
Gino Biancalana (born Georgi Tashev) is a businessman. He entered the house on Day 2 on the village (Old House), where the finalists of the previous Big Brother 5 season stayed. He eventually was allowed to enter the main house (New House), to join the main group of housemates and became a winner on Day 62.

=== Ivo ===
Ivo Tanev is a TV host and operah and pop-folk singer. He entered the house on Day 1 and was the seventh evicted on Day 51.

=== Katrin ===
Katrin Vacheva is a former participant of the Bulgarian version of Playboy Playmate. She entered the house on Day 2 on the village (Old House), where the finalists of the previous Big Brother 5 season stayed. She eventually was allowed to enter the main house (New House), to join the main group of housemates and she was the sixth evicted on Day 44.

=== Kichka ===
Kichka Bodurova is a famous singer. She entered the house on Day 1 and finished third in the finale on Day 62.

=== Kristina ===
Kristina Dimitrova is a famous singer. She entered the house on Day 2 on the village (Old House), where the finalists of the previous Big Brother 5 season stayed. She eventually was allowed to enter the main house (New House), to join the main group of housemates and she was the ninth evicted on Day 60.

=== Luna ===
Luna Yordanova (or simply Luna) is a pop-folk singer. She entered the house on Day 1 and was the fifth evicted on Day 37.

=== Lyudmil ===
Lyudmil "Lyusi" Ilarionov is a director and pop and pop-folk singer. He entered the house on Day 1 and was the tenth evicted on Day 60.

=== Monika ===
Monika Valerieva Krasteva is a former participant of the Bulgarian version of Playboy Playmate, Miss Playmate 2011 Bulgaria, finished third place. She entered the house on Day 1 and was the fourth evicted on Day 30.

=== Plamen ===
Plamen Bogdanov was a housemate in Big Brother 5. He entered the house on Day 1 on the village (Old House), where the finalists of his season stayed. He eventually was allowed to enter the main house (New House), to join the main group of housemates and was the first evicted on Day 9.

=== Preslava ===
Preslava (born Petya Ivanova) is a famous pop-folk singer. She entered the VIP Brother 3 in 2009 as a guest star. She entered the house on Day 1 and decided to walk out of the House on Day 18. She was allowed to re-enter the House on Day 37, but only as a guest star and left in the finale on Day 62.

=== Riton ===
Riton (with members Ekaterina "Katya" Mihaylova and Zdravko Zhelyazkov) are famous pop duet. They entered the house on Day 1 and finished fifth in the finale on Day 62.

=== Stanimir ===
Stanimir Gumov is an actor. He entered the house on Day 1 and finished fourth in the finale on Day 62.

=== Svetlana ===
Svetlana Vasileva is a former participant of the Bulgarian version of Playboy Playmate, Miss Playmate 2009 Bulgaria, finished second place. She entered the house on Day 1 and was the eighth evicted on Day 58.

== Nominations table ==
	Week 1	Week 2	Week 3	Week 4	Week 5	Week 6	Week 7	Week 8	Week 9	Final		Nominations received
Gino	Luna, Djordjano	Luna, Djordjano	Deyan, Svetlana	Monika, Luna	Luna, Kichka	Kichka, Katrin	Kichka, Riton	Stanimir, Kristina	No; Nominations	Winner (Day 62)		5
Ernestina	Plamen, Djordjano	Luna, Djordjano	Lyudmil, Kichka	Luna, Kichka	Luna, Kichka	Kichka, Katrin	Lyudmil, Ivo	Stanimir, Lyudmil	No; Nominations	Runner-up (Day 62)		6
Kichka	Djordjano, Plamen	Djordjano, Luna	Ivo, Riton	Ernestina, Stanimir	Stanimir, Luna	Ivo, Svetlana	Ivo, Svetlana	Kristina, Stanimir	No; Nominations	Third place (Day 62)		33
Stanimir	Plamen, Kichka	Kichka, Djordjano	Kichka, Ivo	Kichka, Luna	Kichka, Luna	Kichka, Katrin	Ivo, Kichka	Gino, Kichka	No; Nominations	Fourth place (Day 62)		4
Riton	Luna, Djordjano	Djordjano, Luna	Gino, Svetlana	Luna, Kichka	Kichka, Luna	Lyudmil, Katrin	Ivo, Lyudmil	Ernestina, Lyudmil	No; Nominations	Fifth place (Day 62)		5
Lyudmil	Luna, Plamen	Luna, Monika	Ivo, Deyan	Luna, Monika	Kichka, Riton	Ivo, Ernestina	Ivo, Ernestina	Gino, Kristina	No; Nominations	Evicted (Day 60)		21
Kristina	Old; House		Exempt	Kichka, Luna	Luna, Kichka	Svetlana, Ernestina	Ivo, Lyudmil	Stanimir, Svetlana	No; Nominations	Evicted (Day 60)		2
Svetlana	Luna, Djordjano	Luna, Lyudmil	Lyudmil, Kichka	Ivo, Kichka	Kichka, Luna	Ivo, Kichka	Kichka, Ivo	Riton, Kichka	Evicted (Day 58)			7
Ivo	Luna, Lyudmil	Luna, Djordjano	Kichka, Deyan	Luna, Kichka	Kichka, Luna	Kichka, Lyudmil	Lyudmil, Kichka	Evicted (Day 51)				16
Katrin	Old; House		Exempt	Monika, Svetlana	Luna, Kichka	Ivo, Ernestina	Evicted (Day 44)					4
Luna	Gino, Lyudmil	Deyan, Kichka	Lyudmil, Ernestina	Lyudmil, Stanimir	Riton, Gino	Evicted (Day 37)						38
Monika	Lyudmil, Luna	Lyudmil, Luna	Lyudmil, Gino	Luna, Lyudmil	Evicted (Day 30)							4
Deyan	Luna, Djordjano	Luna, Djordjano	Gino, Lyudmil	Evicted (Day 23)								4
Preslava	Luna, Djordjano	Luna, Djordjano	Walked (Day 18)			Guest (Day 37–62)						0
Djordjano	Riton, Luna	Luna, Ivo	Evicted (Day 16)									15
Plamen	Lyudmil, Luna	Evicted (Day 9)										4
Nomination notes	1	1, 2	3, 4, 5	6	7	8, 9	10	11, 12	none			
Against public vote	Luna, Lyudmil, Djordjano, Plamen	Kichka, Luna, Lyudmil, Djordjano	Deyan, Gino, Ivo, Kichka, Lyudmil	Kichka, Luna, Monika	Kichka, Luna, Riton	Ernestina, Ivo, Katrin, ~~Kichka~~	Ivo, Kichka, Lyudmil	Kichka, Kristina, Lyudmil, Svetlana	All; Housemates			
Walked	none		Preslava	none								
Evicted	Plamen; Fewest votes to save	Djordjano; Fewest votes to save	Deyan; 13% to save	Monika; Fewest votes to save	Luna; Fewest votes to save	Katrin; 7% to save	Ivo; Fewest votes to save	Svetlana; Fewest votes to save	Kristina; Fewest votes (out of 7)	Riton; Fewest votes (out of 5)	Stanimir; Fewest votes (out of 4)	
Evicted	Plamen; Fewest votes to save	Djordjano; Fewest votes to save	Deyan; 13% to save	Monika; Fewest votes to save	Luna; Fewest votes to save	Katrin; 7% to save	Ivo; Fewest votes to save	Svetlana; Fewest votes to save	Kristina; Fewest votes (out of 7)	Kichka; Fewest votes (out of 3)	Ernestina; Fewest votes (out of 2)	
Evicted	Plamen; Fewest votes to save	Djordjano; Fewest votes to save	Deyan; 13% to save	Monika; Fewest votes to save	Luna; Fewest votes to save	Katrin; 7% to save	Ivo; Fewest votes to save	Svetlana; Fewest votes to save	Lyudmil; Fewest votes (out of 6)	Kichka; Fewest votes (out of 3)	Ernestina; Fewest votes (out of 2)	
Evicted	Plamen; Fewest votes to save	Djordjano; Fewest votes to save	Deyan; 13% to save	Monika; Fewest votes to save	Luna; Fewest votes to save	Katrin; 7% to save	Ivo; Fewest votes to save	Svetlana; Fewest votes to save	Lyudmil; Fewest votes (out of 6)	Gino; Most votes to win		

=== Notes ===
- ^Note 1: As Anita, Ekaterina, Katrin, Kiril and Kristina were in the Old House they were immune.
- ^Note 2: After he was evicted, Plamen gave immunity to Gino.
- ^Note 3: After he was evicted, Djordjano gave immunity to Stanimir.
- ^Note 4: Katrin and Kristina were immune and exempt to nominate since they recently entered the Main House.
- ^Note 5: Monika and Luna were immune because of a conspiracy.
- ^Note 6: After he was evicted, Deyan gave immunity to duet Riton.
- ^Note 7: After she was evicted, Monika gave immunity to Ernestina.
- ^Note 8: After she was evicted, Luna gave immunity to Kristina.
- ^Note 9: At the start of the live show, the nominated housemates - Ernestina, Ivo, Katrin and Kichka played a nomination game. Kichka was the winner and saved herself from possible eviction.
- ^Note 10: After she was evicted, Katrin gave immunity to Kristina.
- ^Note 11: After he was evicted, Ivo gave immunity to Ernestina.
- ^Note 12: During the eighth and final nominations, the housemates had to first vote for who they wanted to win (the name in green) and second for who they didn't want to win (the name in black). They were not able to vote for themselves.
