= Lyubomir Milchev-Dandy =

Bulgarian writer and TV personality (1963–2022)

Lyubomir Milchev
- Born: Lyubomir Iliev Milchev; September 1963; Dupnitsa, Bulgaria
- Died: 27 March 2022 (aged 58); Sofia, Bulgaria
- Education: Sofia University
- Occupations: Journalist, writer, television personality
- Writing career
- Pen name: Dandy
- Genres: short story, journalism

Lyubomir Iliev Milchev (September 1963 – 27 March 2022) was a Bulgarian journalist, television personality and writer. He is known as Dandy, has been called a "secular chronicler" and a "secular lion" in the media in Bulgaria.

== Life ==
Lyubomir Milchev was born in the town of Dupnitsa. His family moved to Pernik (where he grew up), then came to Sofia.

In 1988 he graduated in Bulgarian Cultural Studies and Philology from the Kliment Ohridski University in Sofia. During his doctoral studies he specialized at the Heidelberg University, Germany and at the Ruhr University Bochum, Germany. He was the editor-in-chief of the cultural and information director for Sofia "The City".

He has authored over 15 books. His first book is the "View of the View" story collection. In 1996 he hosted the "Family Album" show on Kodak's BNT. In 2000 he published his second book - "The Dalmatian Marzipan". In 2004 he organized a ball of the Bulgarian National Heritage Foundation.

Leads stories - both fashionable and secular, for Bulgarian publications. Due to his popularity, he participated in a series of shows - "Clash", "Sincerely and personally", "Vote of trust" and others.

In 2006 he participated in the show "Big Brother", re-entered it and ranked 3rd in 2013. He participated in the reality show "Star Interns" in 2015.

== Death ==
After being beaten in February 2022, he was in danger of death and was placed in a medical coma and died on 27 March 2022, in "St. Anna" in Sofia, Bulgaria.
