= VIP Brother season 4 =

VIP Brother
- Season 4
- Presented by: Niki Kanchev; Aleksandra Sarchadjieva
- No. of days: 63
- No. of housemates: 16
- Winner: Orlin Pavlov
- Runner-up: Dimitar

Release
- Original network: Nova Television
- Original release: 16 September – 17 November 2012

Season chronology
- ← Previous season 3 Next → season 5

VIP Brother 4, also referred to as VIP Brother 2012 was the fourth season of the reality show VIP Brother in Bulgaria and the ninth season of the Big Brother format overall. It commenced on Nova Television on September 16, 2012, and lasted for two months, ending on November 17, 2012. It was immediately followed by an All-Stars edition. It was the first season to air more than two years after the family edition and more than three years after the third celebrity edition. Niki Kanchev returned as the show's main presenter for the Live shows on Monday on Wednesday (evictions and nominations, respectively), with Aleksandra Sarchadjieva being the presenter for the daily episodes.

VIP Brother 4 finished on Day 63, making it the longest celebrity edition of the format in Bulgaria so far. It was also the first and so far, the only season with no voluntary exits by any Housemates. Orlin Pavlov won with Dimitar Kovachev "Funky" as the runner-up.

== Production ==
=== Pre-season ===
On March 27, 2012 Endemol announced that a deal with Nova TV had been finalized for another two seasons to be aired.

On June 10, 2012 Nova TV confirmed that VIP Brother 4 would commence in September and that an all-stars edition of Big Brother would be aired after the finale at the end of 2012.

=== Logo ===
The official logo was the same as the one for Big Brother 13 UK. This logo was also used in the first season of Big Brother All Stars in Bulgaria.

== Housemates ==
11 Housemates entered the House on Day 1, and another 5 on Day 2, including Pamela Anderson who was a houseguest for two. Ivan (also houseguest) and Ludmilla entered on Day 9, and Kamelia (as Sofia) on Day 11.

Iren and Vladimir were competing as one contestant.

Each Housemate had a necklace worth 10,000 leva. If evicted, the Housemate had to choose another Housemate to have their necklace.

=== Aksinia ===
Aksinia Chenkova is a pop singer and a former Star Academy participant. She entered the House on Day 2 and was the second evicted on Day 16.

=== Blagoy ===
Blagoy Ivanov "Bagata" is a sportsman and former boyfriend of Zlatka. He entered the House on Day 1 and finished fifth in the finale on Day 63.

=== Bonka ===
Bonka Ilieva "Boni" is a pop-folk singer. She was the first Housemate to enter the House on Day 1. Big Brother gave her a secret mission to make strange comments to the other Housemates, otherwise they would not be given their suitcases. She was the fourth evicted on Day 30.

=== Dimitar ===
Dimitar Kovachev "Funky" is a musician. His father is Bulgarian and his mother is Armenian. He entered the House on Day 2 and finished second in the finale on Day 63.

=== Julian ===
Julian Konstantinov is an operah singer. He entered the House on Day 1 and was the seventh evicted on Day 44.

=== Iren & Vladimir ===
Iren Krivoshieva and Vladimir Danailov are mother and son. Iren is an actress. Vladimir's father of the actor Stefan Danailov. They entered the House on Day 1 and were competing as a single contestant and was the third evicted on Day 23.

=== Kamelia ===
Kamelia Veselinova is Ludmilla's girlfriend. She entered the House on Day 11 with a secret mission to convince the other Housemates that she is Sofia, a girl who had a controversial break-up with a German prince. If she completes her mission successfully, she will be allowed to stay in the House. Kamelia was the tenth evicted on Day 60.

=== Katsi ===
Katsi Vaptsarov is an ex-TV host. He entered the House on Day 1 and finished third in the finale on Day 63.

=== Kristina ===
Kristina Patrashkova is a journalist. She entered the House on Day 1 and was the fifth evicted on Day 37.

=== Ludmilla ===
Ludmilla Diakovska "Lucy" is a pop singer from the girl band No Angels. She entered the House on Day 9 and was the ninth evicted on Day 58.

=== Mariana ===
Mariana Popova is a pop singer. Her fiancé Veselin Plachkov entered six years later in VIP Brother 10 in 2018. She entered the House on Day 1 and was the eighth evicted on Day 51.

=== Nikol ===
Nikol Stankulova is Nova TV's weather girl. She entered the House on Day 1 and finished fourth in the finale on Day 63.

=== Nikolay ===
Nikolay Martinov is the winner of third season of Survivor. He entered the House on Day 1 and was the sixth evicted on Day 37.

=== Orlin ===
Orlin Pavlov is a pop singer and an actor. His former girlfriend Yana Akimova entered six years later in VIP Brother 10 in 2018 with her husband Petko Dimitrov. He entered the House on Day 2 and became a winner on Day 63.

=== Sonya ===
Sonya Koltuklieva is a journalist. She entered the House on Day 2 and was the first evicted on Day 9.

=== Zlatka ===
Zlatka Dimitrova is a model, actress, former Miss Playmate and former girlfriend of Blagoy. She entered the House on Day 1 and was the eleventh evicted on Day 60.

== Houseguests ==
=== Ivan ===
Ivan Laskin is an actor and Aleksandra Sarchadjieva's husband. He entered the House on Day 9 and left on Day 30.

=== Lyuben ===
Lyuben Dilov-son is a journalist and writer. He entered the House on Day 44 and left on Day 51.

=== Pamela ===
On September 9 it was officially announced that Pamela Anderson entered the House on the show's launch night. She entered the House on Day 2 as a special Houseguest and left on Day 4.

=== Vyara, Nadezhda & Lyubov ===
Vyara, Nadezhda and Lyubov Stanchevi are identical triplets. Lyubov was the winner of Big Brother 3. She and her sisters, who were also participants in the third season of Big Brother in 2006, entered the House on Day 37. They were the first Housemates confirmed to participate in Big Brother All-Stars, which commenced after the VIP Brother 4 finale.

== Nominations table ==
	Week 1	Week 2	Week 3	Week 4	Week 5	Week 6	Week 7	Week 8	Final		Nominations received	Necklace count
Orlin	Zlatka, Nikolay	Iren & Vladimir, Dimitar	Iren & Vladimir, Dimitar	Dimitar, Kristina	Kamelia, Nikol	Zlatka, Julian	Mariana	Blagoy, Katsi	Winner (Day 63)		10	2
Dimitar	Sonya	Iren & Vladimir, Katsi	Ludmilla, Iren & Vladimir	Kristina, Orlin	Kristina, Kamelia	Blagoy, Zlatka	Mariana, Zlatka	Orlin, Katsi	Runner-up (Day 63)		22	1
Katsi	Zlatka, Nikolay	Zlatka, Aksinia	Kristina, Nikol	Blagoy, Julian	Kristina, Kamelia	Julian, Zlatka	Zlatka, Kamelia	Zlatka, Blagoy	Third place (Day 63)		30	1
Nikol	Blagoy, Aksinia	Iren & Vladimir, Katsi	Iren & Vladimir, Ludmilla	Bonka	Katsi, Kristina	Zlatka, Julian	Zlatka, Blagoy	Katsi, Zlatka	Fourth place (Day 63)		4	1
Blagoy	Katsi, Nikolay	Dimitar, Orlin	Not eligible	Dimitar, Katsi	Dimitar, Kamelia	Zlatka, Kamelia	Mariana, Kamelia	Katsi, Orlin	Fifth place (Day 63)		16	3
Zlatka	Katsi, Aksinia	Katsi, Aksinia	Iren & Vladimir, Ludmilla	Katsi, Orlin	Katsi, Kamelia	Julian, Blagoy	Mariana, Kamelia	Katsi, Orlin	Evicted (Day 60)		25	1
Kamelia	Not in house		Exempt	Blagoy, Dimitar	Dimitar, Kristina	Blagoy, Zlatka	Mariana, Zlatka	Orlin	Evicted (Day 60)		10	2
Ludmilla	Not in house	Exempt	Kristina, Iren & Vladimir	Dimitar, Katsi	Kristina, Dimitar	Zlatka, Blagoy	Mariana, Zlatka	Katsi, Dimitar	Evicted (Day 58)		6	3
Mariana	Blagoy, Katsi	Dimitar, Iren & Vladimir	Iren & Vladimir, Ludmilla	Dimitar, Katsi	Dimitar, Kristina	Julian	Zlatka, Kamelia	Evicted (Day 51)			6	2
Julian	Aksinia, Katsi	Katsi, Aksinia	Bonka	Katsi, Orlin	Blagoy	Blagoy, Zlatka	Evicted (Day 44)				7	2
Nikolay	Zlatka, Katsi	Zlatka, Aksinia	Dimitar, Ludmilla	Katsi, Blagoy	Katsi, Dimitar	Evicted (Day 37)					7	2
Kristina	Aksinia, Katsi	Aksinia	Nikol, Iren & Vladimir	Katsi, Orlin	Dimitar, Katsi	Evicted (Day 37)					12	1
Bonka	Nikolay, Blagoy	Iren & Vladimir, Katsi	Dimitar, Kristina	Julian, Dimitar	Evicted (Day 30)						5	1
Iren & Vladimir	Zlatka, Nikolay	Dimitar, Zlatka	Dimitar, Kristina	Evicted (Day 23)							13	1
Aksinia	Katsi, Zlatka	Iren & Vladimir, Dimitar	Evicted (Day 16)								9	1
Sonya	Blagoy, Nikolay	Evicted (Day 9)									2	1
Nomination notes	none					1	2	3	none			
Necklace given to	Blagoy	Mariana	Nikolay	Ludmilla	Blagoy; Julian	Ludmilla	Orlin	Kamelia	none			
Head of House	Dimitar	Kristina	Julian	Nikol	Julian	Mariana	Orlin	Kamelia	none			
Against public vote	Katsi, Orlin, Sonya	Aksiniya, Bonka, Iren & Vladimir	Bonka, Iren & Vladimir, Nikolay	Bonka, Katsi, Zlatka	Blagoy, Dimitar, Kristina, Nikolay	Julian, Nikol, Zlatka	Katsi, Mariana, Zlatka	Ludmilla, Katsi, Orlin	All; Housemates			
Evicted	Sonya; Fewest votes (out of 2) to save	Aksinia; 38% (out of 2) to save	Iren & Vladimir; 22.1% to save	Bonka; 16% to save	Kristina; 12.3% (out of 4) to save	Julian; 61.7% to evict	Mariana; Fewest votes to save	Ludmilla; 27.3% to save	Kamelia; Fewest votes (out of 7)	Zlatka; Fewest votes (out of 6)		
Evicted	Sonya; Fewest votes (out of 2) to save	Aksinia; 38% (out of 2) to save	Iren & Vladimir; 22.1% to save	Bonka; 16% to save	Kristina; 12.3% (out of 4) to save	Julian; 61.7% to evict	Mariana; Fewest votes to save	Ludmilla; 27.3% to save	Blagoy; Fewest votes (out of 5)	Nikol; Fewest votes (out of 4)		
Evicted	Sonya; Fewest votes (out of 2) to save	Aksinia; 38% (out of 2) to save	Iren & Vladimir; 22.1% to save	Bonka; 16% to save	Nikolay; 30% (out of 3) to save	Julian; 61.7% to evict	Mariana; Fewest votes to save	Ludmilla; 27.3% to save	Katsi; Fewest votes (out of 3)	Dimitar; 44.2% (out of 2)		
Evicted	Sonya; Fewest votes (out of 2) to save	Aksinia; 38% (out of 2) to save	Iren & Vladimir; 22.1% to save	Bonka; 16% to save	Nikolay; 30% (out of 3) to save	Julian; 61.7% to evict	Mariana; Fewest votes to save	Ludmilla; 27.3% to save	Orlin; 55.8% to win			

=== Notes ===
- ^Note 1 : Mariana had to save two people from her team from nominations. She chose Orlin and Katsi to be immuned.
- ^Note 2 : Orlin had to save two people from his team from nominations. He chose Ludmilla and Dimitar to be immuned.
- ^Note 3 : Kamelia had to save one person from her team from nominations. She chose Nikol to be immuned.
