= Konstantin (singer) =

Konstantin Константин
- Born: Konstantin Ivanov Slavchev; 17 July 1976 (age 50); Sofia, Bulgaria
- Genres: pop-folk, folk
- Occupation: Singer
- Instrument: Vocals
- Years active: 1999–present
- Labels: Orfey, Payner

Konstantin Ivanov Slavchev (Bulgarian: Константин Иванов Славчев) also known as Konstantin (Bulgarian: Константин) is a Bulgarian pop-folk singer. He was the winner of the Bulgarian reality show VIP Brother 1 in 2006.

== Biography ==
Konstantin was born on 17 July 1976 in Sofia, Bulgaria. His mother Maryana is a teacher and his father Ivan works at the Ministry of Interior. Konstantin has a brother named Svetoslav. As a child, he trained and played football. Konstantin was in relationship with the singer Rayna for many years.

== Career ==
His career began at the Bulgarian music company, Orpheus Music in 1999. In 1999, he released his debut song, the pop-folk fan favorite Черна роза(English: Black Rose). The song became a total hit and Konstantin directly became one of the big names in pop folk.

== Personal life ==
In 2010 Konstantin married his girlfriend Nadezhda. The couple has a daughter Maryana (b. 2010) and son Aleksandar (b. 2015).

== Discography ==
=== Albums ===
- Черна роза (Black Rose) (1999)
- Върни се (Come back) (2001)
- Като сън (Like a dream) (2003)
- Червило (Lipstick) (2004)
- Обади ми се (Call me) (2006)
- Константин (Konstantin) (2010)
- Докато сърцето бие (While the heart beats) (2016)
