= Aleksandra Sarchadjieva =

Bulgarian actress

- Александра Сърчаджиева
- Born: May 20, 1983 (age 43); Sofia, Bulgaria
- Occupations: Actress, Television host
- Years active: 2006–present
- Spouse: Ivan Laskin 2006–2019 (his death)

Aleksandra Iosifova Sarchadjieva (Bulgarian: Александра Йосифова Сърчаджиева; born May 20, 1983) is a Bulgarian actress and also television host of Big Brother and Dancing Stars. She has been the main female host of Big Brother in Bulgaria since 2012, having hosted three VIP seasons and two All-Star seasons so far. She also starred in the Bulgarian remake of Married... with Children.

== Personal life ==
Aleksandra is the daughter of two famous Bulgarian actors – the late Pepa Nikolova and Iossif Surchadzhiev.

Aleksandra was married to actor Ivan Laskin, with whom she has a daughter. Ivan was a guest Housemate in VIP Brother 4 in 2012.
