= Niki Kanchev =

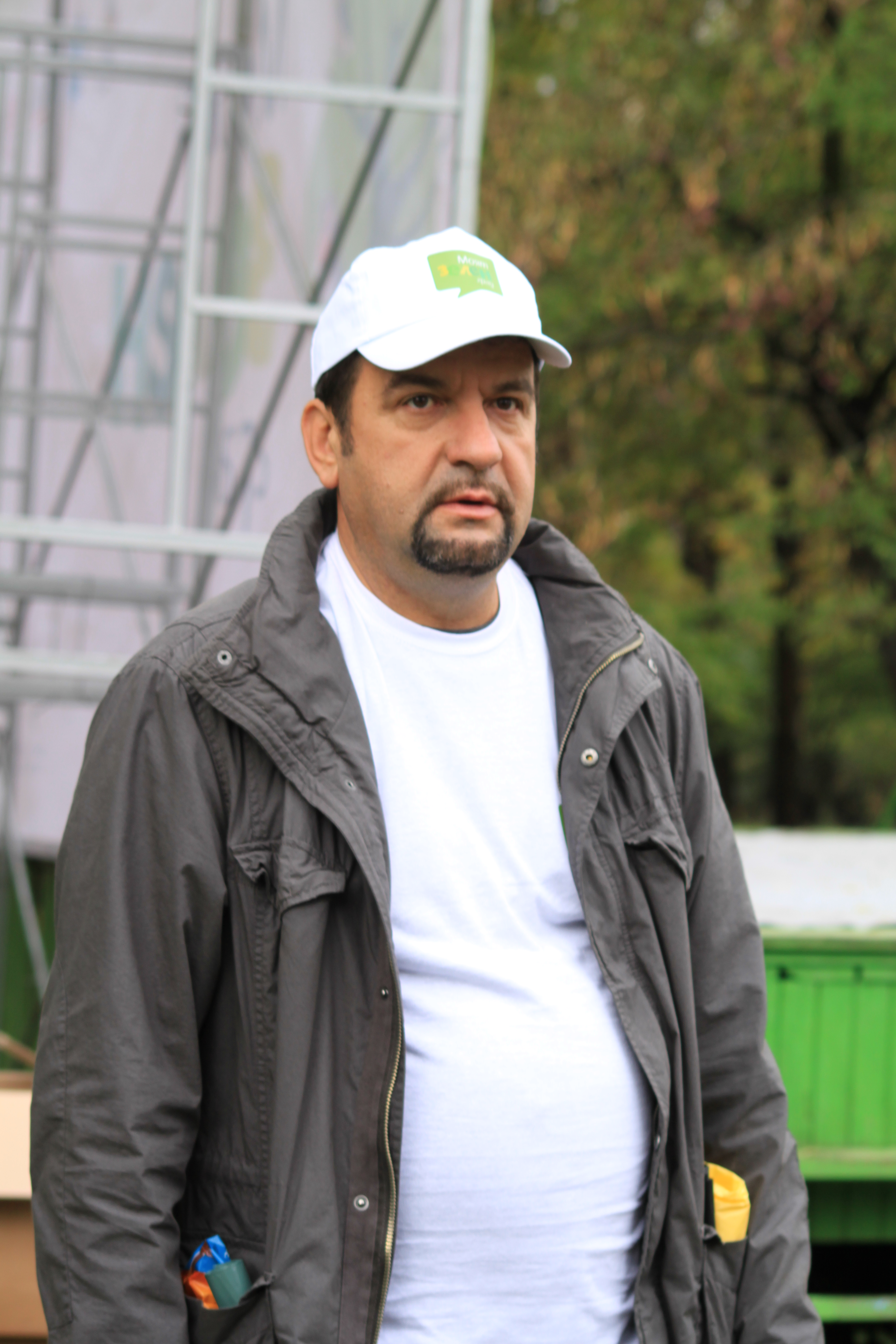
- Born: 26 December 1960 (age 65); Cherven Bryag, Bulgaria
- Occupation: TV Presenter

Nikolay "Niki" Kanchev (Bulgarian: Николай Кънчев, or Ники Кънчев) (born 26 December 1960) is a Bulgarian television presenter, famous for hosting the Bulgarian version of Who Wants to Be a Millionaire? (re-titled to Стани богат (Become Rich), since the award from the start was 100,000 leva, instead of a million) from 2001 to 2014.

He returned again as host of the show 10 years later in 2024. After he became popular with the show, he was selected as a host of Big Brother Bulgaria on the same television channel, Nova Television. Later on, he also hosted the game show 1 vs. 100 (known in Bulgaria as One versus All (Един срещу всички), which made him one of the most frequently appearing hosts on the channel. In late 2008, it was not known whether he would return to host a show on Nova TV, after the producer Nikola Tuparev, a friend of Kanchev, had left SIA Advertising, the company that produced Niki Kanchev's pre-2008 shows together with Nova TV. However, in January 2009 Стани богат returned to Nova TV, but as expected it was produced by Nikola Tuparev's new production company Oldschool Production. In 2019 he was jury in the Bulgarian TV show "The Masked Singer"
