= Kosara =

Kosara may refer to:

== People ==
- Theodora Kosara (fl. ca. 1000), Bulgarian noblewoman married to Prince of Duklja Jovan Vladimir
- Kosara Bokšan (1925–2009), Serbian painter who lived in Paris
- Kosara Cvetković (1868–1953), Serbian writer, correspondent of Milka Grgurova-Aleksić
- Kosara Gavrić, wife of Momčilo Gavrić, Serbian soldier
- Kosara Zdravković, mother of Toma Zdravković, Serbian musician
- Kosara Knez Milojković nee Kostić, mother of Dobrila Glavinić Knez Milojković, Serbian journalist and humanitarian
- Kosara Stefanović, wife of Milovan Glišić, Serbian writer
- Kosara Babić, girlfriend of Velimir Rajić, Serbian poet
- Kosara Koleva, a participant in Big Brother 6 (Bulgarian season)

== Places ==
- Kosara (Lycia), a town of ancient Lycia
- Kosara, Silistra Province, a village in Glavinitsa Municipality, Bulgaria
- Kosara, a peak of Bjelasica, a mountain in Montenegro
- Kosara, a village in Maregaon, Maharashtra, India
- Kosara, a village in Varanasi tehsil, Uttar Pradesh, India

== Other ==
- Kosara, a 1929 opera by Georgi Atanasov, Bulgarian composer

== See also ==
- Vladimir i Kosara, 1829 work by Josif Milovuk, Serbian writer and publisher
- Vladimir i Kosara, 1850 opera libretto by Petar Preradović, Croatian poet
- Kozara
- Kosaras
