= Knez (surname) =

Knez is a South Slavic surname, coming from the title knez. It may refer to:

- Dejan Knez (born 1961), Slovenian artist
- Dobrila Glavinić Knez Milojković (1900–1987), Serbian journalist and humanitarian
- Iván Knez (born 1974), Argentine-Swiss footballer
- Smiljana Knez (born 1962), Slovenian diplomat
- Rudolf Knez (1944–2022), Slovenian ice hockey player
- Tadej Žagar-Knez (born 1991), Slovenian footballer
- Tomislav Knez (born 1938), Bosnian footballer
