= Vanja Džaferović =

Croatian actor, TV personality, and footballer

- Born: 19 March 1983 (age 43); Bosanski Brod, SR Bosnia and Herzegovina, SFR Yugoslavia
- Occupations: Actor, former professional footballer
- Height: 1.83 m (6 ft 0 in)
- Spouse: Evgeniya Džaferović (m. 2012)
- Children: 2
Association football career
- Position: Centre back
Youth career
- Inter Zaprešić
- NK Zagreb
Senior career*
Years	Team	Apps	(Gls)
2002–2005	Segesta		
2005–2007	Beroe Stara Zagora	64	(8)
2008–2010	Lokomotiv Sofia	43	(0)
2010	Ethnikos Achna	0	(0)
2011–2012	Beroe Stara Zagora	22	(5)
Total		129	(13)
- * Club domestic league appearances and goals as of 26 May 2012

Vanja Džaferović (born 19 March 1983) is a Croatian actor, TV personality and former footballer.

== Early life ==
Džaferović was born in Bosanski Brod, Bosnia and Herzegovina, and moved with his family in his childhood to Croatia due to the Bosnian War.

== Career ==
=== Football career ===
Džaferović began his career in the local NK Inter Zaprešić. In June 2002, he transferred to HNK Segesta from Croatian town Sisak.

In July 2005 he signed for Beroe Stara Zagora in the Bulgarian A PFG, for an undisclosed fee. On 7 August 2005, he made his league debut in a 3–1 away loss against Vihren Sandanski. Džaferović scored his first ever goal for Beroe on 18 March 2006 against Litex Lovech; Beroe won 3–1. On 26 October 2006, Beroe manager Ilian Iliev chose Vanja as his club captain.

In 2008 Džaferović signed with Lokomotiv Sofia. He remained at Lokomotiv until July 2010 when he joined Ethnikos Achna after his contract expired, but he never played for the Cyprus team. The following month, he suffered a severe injury and was ruled out for nine months.

Džaferović was out of contract with Ethnikos when he was signed by the Beroe manager Ilian Iliev on 15 December 2010. Džaferović's first appearance back at Beroe was as a substitute against Akademik Sofia on 8 May 2011. Unfortunately, he sustained another injury during his time with Beroe and eventually did not return to football. Džaferović has made 129 appearances in the A PFG, being in the "top 20 club" for foreign players in the top flight of Bulgarian football.

=== TV career ===
In 2014 Džaferović won the 5th season of the Bulgarian version of the popular reality show Survivor. In 2015 he finished as runner-up in the all-star spin-off of Big Brother – Big Brother All Stars. He also joined Your Face Sounds Familiar in 2017 as a contender.

In 2020 he got TV series debut in a main role, joining the Bulgarian TV Series Strawberry Moon, where he plays the role of Alex, a firefighter.

== Personal life ==
Džaferović is married to Evgeniya, a TV personality and participant of Survivor BG: Pearl Islands. In 2012 he completed some paperwork to allow him to stay in Bulgaria.

== Career statistics ==
As of 27 October 2011

Club	Season	League		Cup		Europe		Total	
Club	Season	Apps	Goals	Apps	Goals	Apps	Goals	Apps	Goals
Beroe Stara Zagora	2005–06	24	1	2	0	—		26	1
Beroe Stara Zagora	2006–07	27	5	2	0	—		29	5
Beroe Stara Zagora	2007–08	13	2	1	0	—		14	2
Beroe Stara Zagora	Total	64	8	5	0	0	0	69	8
Lokomotiv Sofia	2007–08	5	0	0	0	0	0	5	0
Lokomotiv Sofia	2008–09	25	0	1	0	2	0	28	0
Lokomotiv Sofia	2009–10	13	0	0	0	—		13	0
Lokomotiv Sofia	Total	43	0	1	0	2	0	46	0
Ethnikos Achna	2010–11	0	0	0	0	—		0	0
Ethnikos Achna	Total	0	0	0	0	0	0	0	0
Beroe Stara Zagora	2010–11	4	0	0	0	—		4	0
Beroe Stara Zagora	2011–12	11	5	0	0	—		11	5
Beroe Stara Zagora	Total	15	5	0	0	0	0	15	5
Career total		121	13	6	0	2	0	129	13

== Filmography ==
Television
Year	Title	Role	Notes
2014	Survivor: Cambodia	Himself – participant	Season 5
2015	Big Brother All Stars	Himself – participant	Season 4
2017	Your Face Sounds Familiar	Himself – performer	Season 5
2018–2019	The Farm: Bulgaria	Guest presenter	
2020	Strawberry Moon	Alex Dragić	Recruiting role: 12 Episodes
