= Big Brother All Stars 2014 =

- Season 3
- Presented by: Niki Kanchev; Aleksandra Sarchadjieva
- No. of days: 27
- No. of housemates: 10
- Winner: Todor Slavkov
- Runner-up: Katerina Evro

Release
- Original network: Nova Television
- Original release: 19 November – 15 December 2014

Season chronology
- ← Previous; Season 2 Next → Season 4

Big Brother All Stars 2014 was the third season of the All-Star spin-off of Big Brother and the fourteenth season of the format in Bulgaria overall. It was announced on 11 November 2014 on the official website of VIP Brother 6. The format the same broadcasting schedule as in 2012 and 2013. It began on Nova Television on 19 November 2014, immediately after the VIP Brother 6 finale and lasted for a month, ending on 15 December. It featured housemates from previous seasons of the show, as well as participants from other reality formats. Todor Slavkov won with Katerina Evro as the runner-up.

Bulgaria was the second country to have three All-Star seasons of the format.

== Housemates ==
10 housemates entered the house on Day 1.

Name	Age	Occupation	Day entered	Day exited	Status
Todor Slavkov VIP Brother 3 X Millionaire Looking for Wife	43	Businessman	1	27	Winner
Katerina Evro VIP Brother 2	58	Actress	1	27	Runner-up
Hristo Trifonov Big Brother Family	43	Businessman	1	27	Third Place
Kalina Paskaleva Temptation Island	28	Writer	1	27	Fourth Place
Niki Kitaetsa VIP Brother 2	30	Fitness instructor	1	27	Fifth Place
Emil Kamenov The Mole 2	34	Security guard	1	24	Evicted
Petya Buyuklieva Musical Academy	55	Pop & rocksinger	1	22	Evicted
Plamena Petrova Music Idol 2	25	Pop & pop-folk singer	1	20	Evicted
Borislav Zahariev "Bobi Turboto" VIP Dance	33	Actor & comedian	1	13	Evicted
Boni The Magnificent Six 2 VIP Brother 4	57	Pop-folk singer	1	8	Evicted

=== Boni ===
Boni (born Bonka Ilieva) was a contestant from VIP Brother 4 and The Magnificent Six 2 where she won. She entered the house on Day 1 and was the first evicted on Day 8.

=== Borislav ===
Borislav Zahariev "Bobi Turboto" was a contestant from VIP Dance where he finished second. He entered the house on Day 1 and was the second evicted on Day 13.

=== Emil ===
Emil Kamenov was a contestant from The Mole 2. He entered the house on Day 1 and was the fifth evicted on Day 24.

=== Hristo ===
Hristo Trifonov was a contestant from Big Brother Family. Twelve years later, his daughter Desislava participated in another format of NOVA Hell's Kitchen. He entered the house on Day 1 and finished third in the finale on Day 27.

=== Kalina ===
Kalina Paskaleva was a contestant from Temptation Island. She entered the house on Day 1 and finished fourth in the finale on Day 27.

=== Katerina ===
Katerina Evro was a contestant from VIP Brother 2 where she finished fourth. She entered the house on Day 1 and finished second in the finale on Day 27.

=== Niki ===
Niki Kitaetsa (born Nikolay Parvanov) was the first officially confirmed Housemate on November 14. He was a contestant from VIP Brother 2 where he entered together with his former husband Azis at that time and finished on third place. He is currently heterosexually married with a child and wants to clear his homosexual past. He entered the house on Day 1 and finished fifth in the finale on Day 27.

=== Petya ===
Petya Buyuklieva was a contestant from Musical Academy. She enterthe house on Day 1 and was the fourth evicted on Day 22.

=== Plamena ===
Plamena Petrova was a contestant from Music Idol 2. She entered the house on Day 1 and was the third evicted on Day 20.

=== Todor ===
Todor Slavkov was a contestant from VIP Brother 3, where he finished third, and X Millionaire Looking for Wife, where he had the role of the millionaire. He entered the house on Day 1 and became a winner on Day 27.

== Nominations table ==
	Week 2	Week 3	Day 15	Final		Nominations received
Todor	Hristo, Boni	Katerina, Petya	Kalina, Plamena	Winner (Day 27)		7
Katerina	Todor, Niki	Petya, Emil	Todor, Niki	Runner-up (Day 27)		1
Hristo	Boni, Kalina	Emil, Todor	Kalina, Petya	Third place (Day 27)		9
Kalina	Hristo, Boni	Petya, Borislav	Petya, Niki	Fourth place (Day 27)		6
Niki	Borislav, Hristo	Borislav, Hristo	Plamena, Petya	Fifth place (Day 27)		5
Emil	Hristo, Todor	Petya, Todor	Todor, Petya	Evicted (Day 24)		2
Petya	Kalina, Hristo	Hristo, Kalina	Kalina, Plamena	Evicted (Day 22)		10
Plamena	Boni, Borislav	Borislav, Petya	Petya, Todor	Evicted (Day 20)		5
Borislav	Hristo, Niki	Plamena, Niki	Evicted (Day 13)			5
Boni	Hristo, Plamena	Evicted (Day 8)				4
Nomination notes	none					
Head of House	Emil	none	Hristo	none		
Against public vote	Boni, Emil, Hristo, Petya	Borislav, Emil, Hristo, ~~Petya~~, Todor	Emil, Kalina, Petya, Plamena, Todor	All; Housemates		
Evicted	Boni; Fewest votes to save	Borislav; Fewest votes to save	Plamena; Fewest votes to save	Petya; Fewest votes (out of 7)	Emil; 10,6% (out of 6)	
Evicted	Boni; Fewest votes to save	Borislav; Fewest votes to save	Plamena; Fewest votes to save	Niki; Fewest votes (out of 5)	Kalina; Fewest votes (out of 4)	
Evicted	Boni; Fewest votes to save	Borislav; Fewest votes to save	Plamena; Fewest votes to save	Hristo; Fewest votes (out of 3)	Katerina; Fewest votes (out of 2)	
Evicted	Boni; Fewest votes to save	Borislav; Fewest votes to save	Plamena; Fewest votes to save	Todor; Most votes to win		
