= Petia (singer) =

- Born: Petia Pavlova
- Genres: Pop, dance, House, Electronica, Jazz
- Occupations: singer, songwriter, actress, producer, celebrity columnist, entrepreneur
- Years active: 1994–present
- Website: www.petiaonline.com

Petia Pavlova (Bulgarian: Петя Павлова), known mononymously as Petia, is a Bulgarian-American singer-songwriter and actress, based in Los Angeles. In 1997 she became the face of Pepe Jeans London. Petia moved to London, UK in 1998 where she studied Commercial Music and Music Business Management at the University of Westminster. She relocated to United States in 2009 and currently resides in Los Angeles, California.

== Music career ==
Petia has released three albums: The Dream (in Bulgarian); Let's Make Love, a jazz album with songs from Broadway shows and film musicals, recorded with the Bulgarian National Radio Orchestra; and Runaway.

Runaway was released in Bulgaria in December 2006 through Max Music and is made available for purchase worldwide via internet distribution by InGrooves in July 2007. Three of the songs from the album—"Going Down", "Obscenely Delicious" and "Runaway"—entered various charts in Bulgaria and Europe.

In September 2007 Petia's CD single "Obscenely Delicious" was released with seven club remixes, some of which produced by DJ Strobe and DJ Lion. The video of "Obscenely Delicious" reached No:5 in the MTV European's World Chart Express; No:5 in the Bulgarian Top 100 and in October 2007 entered also the Top 50 Chart of MAD TV Greece – the first entry of a Bulgarian artist in the Greek charts.

"Going Down", "Obscenely Delicious" and "Runaway" videos of Petia were three of the most requested and played videos in Bulgaria for 2007 and her album Runaway was nominated for Album of the Year by MM TV.

In 2014 Petia released the single "Your Love's Bad For My Health".

== Television and film ==
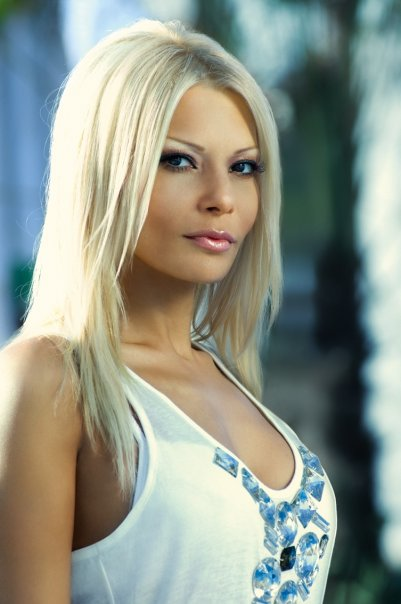
Petia Photo by MEM

As an actress Petia appears with Sacha Baron Cohen in Ali G Indahouse and with Tomas Arana in Spooks.

In March 2007 Petia was invited to take part in Celebrity Big Brother (VIP Brother) reality show in Bulgaria.

Petia has also guest-presented as Star Reporter on the prime time TV News Daily Broadcasting on Nova TV and hosted her own show Petia's Music Show on MSAT TV in 2008.

In September 2008, Petia joined the cast of the TV drama Forbidden Love, taking the role of Sonya. The TV series was aired on Nova TV in Bulgaria.

== Modelling ==
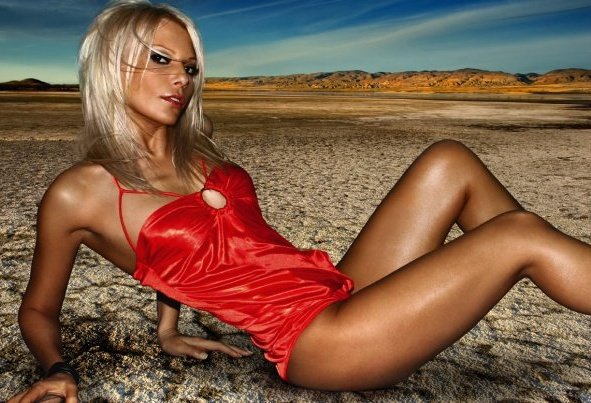
Petia for INTRO Magazine

In 1997, Petia became the face and spokesperson of Pepe Jeans London.

In 2007, Petia signed one year sponsorship deal with Sobieski vodka and they released her 12-page 2007 swimsuit calendar. In 2008, Petia was "The Party Girl" of the cover of June 2008 issue of GO Guide. In 2009, Petia modelled the Spring/Summer collection of DEMOBAZA.

Petia is featured on the cover of magazines such as: INTRO, GO, Grazia, OK!, CLUB M, and MODA.

== Discography ==
=== Singles ===
- "Good Times" (1997)
- "Cry for My Love" (2002)
- "Mirage" (2004)
- "Superwoman" (2005)
- "Obscenely Delicious" (2007)
- "Your Love's Bad For My Health" (2014)

=== Albums ===
- The Dream (1994)
- Let's Make Love (1996)
- Runaway (2006)
