= Big Brother 5 (Bulgarian season) =

- Season 5
- Presented by: Niki Kanchev; Aleksandra Sarchadjieva
- No. of days: 26
- No. of housemates: 13
- Winner: Nikita Jönsson
- Runner-up: Kiril Simeonov

Release
- Original network: Nova Television
- Original release: 17 August – 11 September 2015

Season chronology
- ← Previous; Season 4 Next → Season 6

Big Brother 5, also known as Big Brother: 100% натурален (lit. 100% Natural) was the fifth season of the Bulgarian reality television series Big Brother, and the fifteenth season of the format overall. The series launched on Nova Television on 17 August 2015, seven years after the last regular season of the format since Big Brother 4.

The promo for the new season began airing on Nova Television on 2 June 2015. The show commenced on August 17, 2015. Niki Kanchev and Aleksandra Sarchadjieva returned as main presenters.

Lasted for 26 days, it was the shortest season of the format in Bulgaria (including Celebrity and All-Stars editions), as well as the shortest regular season ever produced as part of the Big Brother franchise around the world. Nikita Jönsson won with Kiril Simeonov as the runner-up.

== Production ==
=== Format ===
The season was confirmed 2 June 2015 when Nova TV announced opening of the auditions for new Housemates.

Although Big Brother Family was initially announced as Big Brother 5 back in 2009, this was considered as the fifth regular season of the series in Bulgaria.

=== Teasers ===
On 25 May 2015 during the season finale of Your Face Sounds Familiar, a short promo with the sound theme and the Big Brother 2 eye aired, hinting that a new season was announced. The teaser was aired through the whole week until 2 June when Nova TV officially announced the return of the show.

== Housemates ==
11 Housemates entered the House on Day 1. They were joined by 2 other Housemates on Day 2.

Name	Age on entry	Occupation	Hometown	Day entered	Day exited	Status
Nikita Jönsson	38	Businesswoman	Sofia	1	26	Winner
Kiril Simeonov	30	Share trading	Sofia	1	26	Runner-up
Plamen Bogdanov	22	Fitness instructor	Pazardzhik	1	26	Third Place
Anita Bolyarova	33	Spa manager	Pleven	1	26	Fourth Place
Ekaterina Balabanova	28	Bracelets and necklaces maker	Sofia	1	26	Fifth Place
Adelina Banakieva-Ivanova	46	Exterior and interior designer	Sofia	2	24	Evicted
Nikolina Markova	29	Lawyer	Varna	2	22	Evicted
Plamen Dimitrov	25	Manager and bartender	Sofia	1	19	Walked
Irena Petrova	30	Teacher	Lukovit	1	17	Ejected
Silvia Yurukova	26	Model	Lovech	1	17	Ejected
Boris Bratuhchev	34	Trader	Burgas	1	15	Evicted
Tsvetelin Nikolov	38	Businessman	Sofia	1	15	Evicted
Kristian Stoykov	21	Model	Pleven	1	8	Evicted

=== Adelina ===
Adelina Banakieva-Ivanova is from Sofia. She entered the House on Day 2. and was the fifth evicted on Day 24.

=== Anita ===
Anita Bolyarova is from Pleven. She entered the House on Day 1 and finished fourth in the finale on Day 26.

=== Boris ===
Boris Bratuhchev is from Burgas. He entered the House on Day 1 and was the third evicted on Day 15.

=== Ekaterina ===
Ekaterina Balabanova is from Sofia. She entered the House on Day 1 and finished fifth in the finale on Day 26.

=== Irena ===
Irena Petrova is from Lukovit. She entered the House on Day 1 and was ejected on Day 17, after a fight with Silvia.

=== Kiril ===
Kiril Simeonov is from Varna. He entered the House on Day 1 and finished second in the finale on Day 26.

=== Kristian ===
Kristian Stoykov is from Pleven. He entered the House on Day 1 and was the first evicted on Day 8.

=== Nikita ===
Nikita Jönsson is from Sofia but lives in Sweden for over 20 years. She entered the House on Day 1 and became a winner on Day 26. At the time of her participation in the show her boyfriend was Borislav from Big Brother 3.

=== Nikolina ===
Nikolina Markova is from Varna. She entered the House on Day 2 and was the fourth evicted on Day 22.

=== Plamen B. ===
Plamen Bogdanov is from Pazardjik. He entered the House on Day 1 and finished third in the finale on Day 26.

=== Plamen D. ===
Plamen Dimitrov is from Sofia. He entered the House on Day 1. From Day 15 to Day 19 he was hospitalized, because he had an injury during a mission in the House. The doctors advised him to have a rest, so Plamen D. walked on Day 19.

=== Silvia ===
Silvia Yurukova is from Gabrovo. She entered the House on Day 1 and was ejected on Day 17, after a fight with Irena.

=== Tsvetelin ===
Tsvetelin Nikolov is from Sofia. He entered the House on Day 1 and was the second evicted on Day 15.

== Nominations table ==
	Week 1	Week 2	Week 3	Week 4 Final		Nominations received
Nikita	Kristian, Silvia	Tsvetelin, Kiril	Kiril, Nikolina	Winner (Day 26)		9
Kiril	Kristian, Nikita	Boris, Nikita	Nikita, Adelina	Runner-up (Day 26)		6
Plamen B.	Kristian, Plamen D.	Plamen D., Irena	Nikita, Anita	Third place (Day 26)		5
Anita	Adelina, Plamen D.	Adelina, Kiril	Kiril, Nikolina	Fourth place (Day 26)		3
Ekaterina	Adelina, Irena	Irena, Nikita	Adelina, Nikita	Fifth place (Day 26)		0
Adelina	Kristian, Anita	Boris, Irena	Nikolina, Kiril	Evicted (Day 24)		6
Nikolina	Kristian, Silvia	Silvia, Nikita	Nikita, Adelina	Evicted (Day 22)		3
Plamen D.	Kristian, Plamen B.	Plamen B., Tsvetelin	Hospitalized (Day 15–19)	Walked (Day 19)		6
Irena	Plamen B., Tsvetelin	Plamen B., Tsvetelin	Ejected (Day 17)			5
Silvia	Irena, Anita	Boris, Plamen D.	Ejected (Day 17)			4
Boris	Kristian, Plamen B.	Nikita, Silvia	Evicted (Day 15)			5
Tsvetelin	Kristian, Plamen D.	Plamen D., Boris	Evicted (Day 15)			4
Kristian	Kiril, Boris	Evicted (Day 8)				8
Nomination notes	1	2	3, 4	5		
Against public vote	Boris, Kiril, Kristian, Plamen B., Plamen D.	Boris, Irena, Nikita, ~~Plamen D.~~, Tsvetelin	Adelina, Kiril, Nikita, Nikolina	All; Housemates		
Walked	none		Plamen D.	none		
Ejected	none		Silvia, Irena	none		
Evicted	Kristian; 49% to evict	Tsvetelin; 55% to evict	Nikolina; Most votes to evict	Adelina; Most votes (out of 6)	Ekaterina; Fewest votes (out of 5)	
Evicted	Kristian; 49% to evict	Boris; 30% to evict	Nikolina; Most votes to evict	Anita; Fewest votes (out of 4)	Plamen B. Fewest votes (out of 3)	
Evicted	Kristian; 49% to evict	Boris; 30% to evict	Nikolina; Most votes to evict	Kiril; 30% (out of 2)	Nikita; 70% to win	

=== Notes ===
- ^Note 1: Kristian was declared the Big Boss of the house, and his nominations (Boris and Kiril) were automatically nominated.
- ^Note 2: During a mission, Plamen D. had a serious injury and he was removed from being evicted.
- ^Note 3: After the second eliminations, Silvia and Irena had a fight in the House. Because of this, Big Brother ejected them on Day 17.
- ^Note 4: Plamen D. wasn't in the house, because he was still in the hospital for a third day. Despite his good condition, Plamen D. had to stay in the hospital for more treatment.
- ^Note 5: On Day 24, the housemates had to choose with a majority which of them to be evicted two days before the final. Nikita and Kiril were immune as they were leaders in the viewers voting. Kiril, Plamen B., Anita and Ekaterina voted for Adelina to be evicted, making them a majority.
