= List of Big Brother (Bulgarian TV series) contestants =

This is an alphabetical list of contestants on the Bulgarian version of Big Brother. More information for each individual housemate can be found on their respective series page.

The list is in alphabetical order of their first name or nickname.

== Big Brother contestants ==
Big Brother
VIP Brother

Name	Series	Age	Nationality	Status	Occupation (before entering)
Alidjan Aliev	BB1	31	Bulgaria	Evicted	Computer specialist
Anelia Ivanova	BB1	31	Bulgaria	Evicted	Housewife
Dimitar Kazalov	BB1	40	Bulgaria	Walked	-
Margarita Grigorova	BB1	38	Bulgaria	Evicted	-
Mariela Kiselkova	BB1	23	Bulgaria	Evicted	Graphic designer
Nayden Naydenov	BB1	24	Bulgaria	Ejected	Internet club
Silvia-Alexandra Docheva	BB1	25	Bulgaria	Evicted	Student
Stoyka Stefanova	BB1	25	Bulgaria	Evicted	Unemployed
Svetlan Shevrov	BB1	32	Bulgaria	Ejected	Carpenter
Svetlozara Trendafilova	BB1	19	Bulgaria	2nd place	Model
Tihomir Georgiev	BB1	31	Bulgaria	Evicted	Businessman
Veneta Mileva-Ilieva	BB1	36	Bulgaria	Walked	Cosmetic
Victor Jechkov	BB1	27	Bulgaria	3rd place	Dentist
Zdravko Vasilev	BB1	27	Bulgaria	Winner	-
Zeyneb Madjurova	BB1	19	Bulgaria	Evicted	-
Daniela Dimitrova	BB2	24	Bulgaria	Evicted	-
Elena Georgieva	BB2	23	Bulgaria	Evicted	Fashion designer
Elena Romele	BB2	39	Bulgaria	Evicted	Translator
Irena Vasileva	BB2	39	Bulgaria	Evicted	Manager
Ivan Naydenov	BB2	35	Bulgaria	Evicted	Software engineer
Leonardo Bianchi	BB2	31	Italy	2nd place	Restaurant owner
Marian Zahariev	BB2	28	Bulgaria	Evicted	Cauffeur
Miglena Kamenova	BB2	29	Bulgaria	Evicted	Economist
Dicho Hristov	VIPB1	32	Bulgaria	3rd place	Musician
Dim Dukov	VIPB1	41	Bulgaria	5th place	Manager
Galina Kurdova	VIPB1	27	Bulgaria	Walked	Singer
Galya Litova	VIPB1	26	Bulgaria	Walked	Model
Kiril Vulchev	VIPB1	35	Bulgaria	6th place	Businessman
Konstantin Slavov	VIPB1	29	Bulgaria	Winner	Singer
LiLana	VIPB1	20	Bulgaria	Evicted	Singer
Liubomir Milchev	VIPB1	43	Bulgaria	Walked	Writer
Mitio Pishtova	VIPB1	50	Bulgaria	4th place	Manager
Raina	VIPB1	24	Bulgaria	Evicted	Singer
Vesela Neynski	VIPB1	-	Bulgaria	Walked	Singer/Actress
Violeta Zdravkova	VIPB1	28	Bulgaria	2nd place	Model
Zvezdelin Minchev	BB2	40	Bulgaria	4th place	Art-director
Miroslav Atanasov	BB2	25	Bulgaria	Winner	Polygraphic
Nedyalko Lazarov	BB2	31	Bulgaria	Evicted	Manager
Petko Vasilev	BB2	27	Bulgaria	Evicted	Salesman
Plamena Nikolaeva	BB2	21	Bulgaria	Evicted	Student
Radomira Kosadjieva	BB2	18	Bulgaria	Evicted	Waitress
Radoslav Stoyanov	BB2	21	Bulgaria	Walked	Fitness instructor
Silva Bratanova	BB2	20	Bulgaria	Walked	Student
Silvia Dragoeva	BB2	23	Bulgaria	Evicted	Fashion designer
Stefan Kemalov	BB2	28	Bulgaria	3rd place	Businessman
Maya Yocova	BB2	19	Bulgaria	Evicted	Unemployed
Borislav Borisov	BB3	25	Bulgaria	Evicted	Sportsman
Azis	VIPB2	29	Bulgaria	Walked	Singer
Veneta Raykova	VIPB2	32	Bulgaria	Evicted	TV presenter
Veselin Danov	VIPB2	53	Bulgaria	Walked	Politician
DesiSlava	VIPB2	28	Bulgaria	2nd place	Singer
Zdravko Vasilev	VIPB2	29	Bulgaria	Evicted	Participated in BB1
Kalin Velyov	VIPB2	33	Bulgaria	Evicted	Musician
Katerina Evro	VIPB2	50	Bulgaria	4th place	Actress
Niki "Kitaeca"	VIPB2	22	Bulgaria	3rd place	Azis's husband
Magdalena Jelyazkova	VIPB2	33	Bulgaria	6th place	TV presenter/Model
Petya Pavlova	VIPB2	-	Bulgaria	Evicted	Actress/Singer
Rosica Noveva	VIPB2	27	Bulgaria	Evicted	Businesswoman
Tihomir Georgiev	VIPB2	33	Bulgaria	5th place	Participated in BB1
Hristina Stefanova	VIPB2	29	Bulgaria	Winner	Zdravko's wife
