= Big Brother 7 (Bulgarian season) =

- Season 7
- Presented by: Bashar Rahal; Aleksandra Bogdanska
- No. of days: 55
- No. of housemates: 16
- Winner: David Bett
- Runner-up: Valentin Kotov

Release
- Original network: Nova Television
- Original release: 21 September – 15 November 2025

Season chronology
- ← Previous; Season 6

Big Brother 7 is the seventh season of the Bulgarian reality television series Big Brother, and the twenty-fourth season of the format overall. The series launched on Nova Television on September 21, 2025.

== Housemates ==
A total of 16 Housemates entered the House.

Name	Age on entry	Occupation	Residence	Day entered	Day exited	Status
David Bett	20	Baker	Sofia	0	55	Winner
Valentin Kotov	25	Lawyer and jurist	Plovdiv	6	55	Runner-up
Siyana Slavova	21	Hostess	Plovdiv	0	55	Third Place
Stefan Stoyanov	22	Military veteran	Plovdiv	0	55	Fourth Place
Mihaela Vasileva	35	Influencer	Varna	48	53	Evicted
Mihaela Vasileva	35	Influencer	Varna	0	20	Walked
Elena Georgieva	33	Finance student and clothing store owner	Sofia	0	52	Evicted
Stefan Nikolov	31	Programmer and content creator	Plovdiv	0	51	Evicted
Lena Kavasian	30	Car repair shop worker	Sofia	0	50	Evicted
Ebru Mustafa	26	Teacher	Nesebar	0	48	Evicted
Kalin Borisov	50	Truck driver	Kozarsko	0	41	Evicted
Ivan Abadzhiev	36	DJ and musician	Sofia	0	41	Ejected
Mina Stoyanova	21	Pharmacy student	Pazardzhik	0	34	Evicted
Tsvetan Georgiev	30	Barista	Sofia	0	34	Walked
Tsvetelina Vladislavova	52	Accountant	Sofia	0	27	Evicted
Stefani Yordanova	21	Tattoo artist	Malorad	0	13	Evicted
Muti Mutiev	31	Musician and prison host	Germany	0	6	Evicted

=== David ===
David Bett is from Trier, but currently lives in Sofia. He entered the House on Day 0 and was announced as the winner on Day 55.

=== Ebru ===
Ebru Mustafa is from Nesebar. She entered the House on Day 0 and was evicted on the last live eviction on Day 48.

=== Elena ===
Elena Georgieva is from Sofia. She entered the House on Day 0 and was evicted on Day 52 via the back door.

=== Ivan ===
Ivan Abadzhiev is from Varna, but currently lives in Sofia. He entered the House on Day 0 and was ejected on Day 41, due to aggressive behaviour towards Stefan S.

=== Kalin ===
Kalin Borisov is from Vidin, but currently lives in Kozarsko. He entered the House on Day 0 and was evicted during the sixth eliminations on Day 41.

=== Lena ===
Lena Kavasian is from Syria, but has lived in Sofia for many years. She entered the House on Day 0 and was the first evicted during the final week on Day 50.

=== Mihaela ===
Mihaela Vasileva is from Gabrovo, but has lived in Varna for many years. She entered the House on Day 0 and walked voluntarily on Day 20. However, she returned to the house on Day 48 after being the only housemate to leave by her own will and was the last to be evicted before the final on Day 53.

=== Mina ===
Mina Stoyanova is from Pazardzhik. She entered the House on Day 0 and was evicted on Day 34.

=== Muti ===
Muti Mutiev is from Pleven but has lived in Germany for many years. He entered the House on Day 0 and became the first evicted on Day 6.

=== Siyana ===
Siyana Slavova is from Plovdiv. She entered the House on Day 0 and finished third on the final on Day 55.

=== Stefan N. ===
Stefan Nikolov is from Plovdiv. He entered the House on Day 0 and left the House on Day 51 via the back door.

=== Stefan S. ===
Stefan Stoyanov is from Plovdiv. He entered the House on Day 0 and finished fourth on the final on Day 55.

=== Stefani ===
Stefani Yordanova is from Malorad. She entered the House on Day 0 and was evicted second on Day 13.

=== Tsvetan ===
Tsvetan Georgiev is from Sofia. He entered the House on Day 0, but after being hospitalized, he had to walk on Day 34.

=== Tsvetelina ===
Tsvetelina Vladislavova is from Sofia. She entered the House on Day 0 and became the fourth housemate to left the house on Day 27.

=== Valentin ===
Valentin Kotov is from Plovdiv. He entered the House on Day 6 and finished as the runner-up on Day 55.

== Weekly summary ==
Week 1	Entrances	On Day 0, Mina, Tsvetan, Kalin, Mihaela, Ivan, Siyana, Tsvetelina, Stefan S., Stefani, David, Ebru, Muti, Elena, Lena and Stefan N. entered the house.; On Day 6, Valentin entered in a secret room with a secret mission.
Week 1	Twists	On Day 0, upon Mina and Tsvetan's enter, they were told they would lead two teams - Mina leading the blue team and the living room and Tsvetan - the red team and the kitchen. They would have to convince the other housemates to join them. At the end of the night the blue team consisted of Mina, Kalin, Mihaela, Ivan, Siyana, Stefani, David, Ebru, Muti, Elena and Stefan N. and the red team consisted of Tsvetan, Tsvetelina, Stefan S. and Lena. At the end of the night it was revealed that the red team would be Housemates and the blue team - Non-Housemates, who were forbidden from entering the house.; On Day 0, a vote was held on the app Nova Play for the favorite housemate based on first impressions. Kalin won with 17%, but it was then revealed he would be the first nominated housemate.; On Day 5, the housemates were called one by one in the Diary Room to choose one superpower card consisting an advantage or a personal privilege that could be used during the whole season. If a housemate told anyone about his/her advantage, that card would be deactivated and would lose its power.; On Day 6, during the live eliminations it was revealed David's reward from the category challenge was that he could save one of the nominated housemates - he chose to save Kalin.
Week 1	Nominations	On Day 3, the first nominations took place. Mina and Muti faced eviction alongside Kalin, who was automatically nominated.
Week 1	Tasks	On Day 1, the Housemates consisting Tsvetan, Tsvetelina, Stefan S. and Lena had to put on janitor uniforms and had to help the Non-Housemates with everything while also giving them a part of their belongings. The next day, the resting Non-Housemates voted whether they were happy with how they were treated. Most of them voted with "yes" and the mission was announced as completed, with the reward being all of the Non-Housemates also becoming Housemates.; On Day 1, the Non-Housemates had to vote for one of them to become a full-fledged housemate. They chose Mina. However, the Housemates had to guess who was the chosen one with them answering Stefani. They were punished with choosing one of them to become part of the Non-Housemates with that contestant being Stefan S.; On Day 1, after Mina's enter in the House, David was proclaimed as the new leader of the Non-Housemates, who had to follow his rules.; On Day 2, a deal was proposed to the Non-Housemates - one of them could sign a contract, including a pass to the house becoming a Housemate, immunity for the week and a change of the name - Vushka (eng: louse). Siyana decided to sign the contract, becoming a Housemate.; On Day 2, Mihaela was asked in the Diary Room about the three biggest problems to the Non-Housemates, as Big Brother told her he could help them with one of these problems. Unknown to her that the Non-Housemates were already at the House, she chose to help them with the hygiene, with condition of also changing her name to Ovtsa (eng: Sheep) and gaining immunity for the week.; On Day 4, the housemates were voting on 15 various categories of positive or negative qualities based on first impressions. At the end, David being the housemate with the most won categories - most funny, naive and prattling, won a secret privilege.
Week 1	Exits	On Day 6, Muti became the first evicted housemate.
Week 2	Twists	On Day 9, after sabotaging his secret mission, Valentin was nominated for doing so and was also given a heavy metal ball for his leg with which he had to walk all the time. Later that day, Stefan S. used his superpower card to save Valentin from the nominations.; On Day 9, at the end of Mina's birthday party she was granted a present - to directly nominate a housemate. She chose Mihaela.
Week 2	Nominations	On Day 10, the second nominations were held. Stefani and Ivan received the most nominations and joined Mihaela and Valentin for facing eviction.
Week 2	Tasks	On Day 8, two days after his entrance, it was announced that Valentin had to chat with the housemates under the name Desislava. He had to make them believe that he is an attractive woman. After declining the mission, Big Brother told him that he could make the task only chatting Ivan. If Valentin convinced him that he is a woman, he would enter the House with immunity. The next day, Big Brother asked Ivan about the new housemate and Ivan wrongly accused him of being an AI, after Valentin tried to ruin his cover, he entered the house.; On Day 8, started the academy mission - the housemates were separated in two teams - boys and girls, who would fight through various intelligence tests, with the winning team gaining control for the budget. After solving a coded message, Tsvetan became the leader of the boys. The girls chose Elena as their leader. The leaders had to be called "professor" and the other housemates - "colleague", while also wearing lab uniforms. Outside, a bowl was placed, where the professors started a fire, that the housemates had to keep it burn. After making a lot of breaches of the rules, Big Brother tested their basic knowlenge in different sciences in order to avoid being fined off the budget. The girls guessed 3 and the boys - 2 questions. On the next day, Stefan S. and Mihaela played a card matching game with Stefan S. winning. On the next day, the mission ended with the result being 10-5 for the boys.; On Day 10, Elena and Tsvetan chose Lena and Valentin to compete in a mission. After they went out the House, they sat on a table with a cake and a button placed between them. After that, the cake exploded and Big Brother told them that an arbiter would come outside. They had to convince him that the other player pressed the button to explode the cake. The housemates inside chose Kalin as the arbiter, who then guessed Valentin pressed the button, therefore Lena was given immunity and Valentin was automatically nominated.; On Day 11, housemates were asked to the garden where they would have to make an electrical circuit - there were sign with statements each concerning two of the housemates. They would have to arrange in the correct order, grabbing the handles on both sides of each sign, to unlock a box with a reward. Guided by Valentin, the housemates won a food delivery.
Week 2	Exits	On Day 13, Stefani was evicted second from the house.
Week 3	Twists	On Day 17, after remaining the only one unshot at the paintbow mission, David won immunity.; On Day 17, after he was not nominated with a majority, Kalin failed to win immunity and was instead automatically nominated.; On Day 17, Lena used her superpower card to save herself from eviction and decided to put Tsvetan in her place instead. Then Mihaela went on to use her superpower card, that cancels the action of the previous card played, meaning Lena was still up for elimination.
Week 3	Nominations	On Day 17, the third nominations occurred. Lena, Mihaela and Mina gathered the most votes. Kalin joined them after not being nominated by the majority of housemates and failing to win immunity.
Week 3	Tasks	On Day 15, the new weekly Barrack mission began. Kalin was chosen as the leader who had to treat the soldiers strictly and had to be called Starshina. If he would be nominated this week, he would get immunity. At the evening, Lena revealed to Kalin about the secret sumggling and got his position as Starshina. winning food for herself.; On Day 15 started Siyana's secret mission. She had to make Stefan N. hug her, kiss her and cry. If she managed to do it without getting caught, she would win luxury budget for the housemates. She completed the task, but the housemates suspected her the next day, so the mission was announced as failed.; On Day 15, David had to bring in secretly some beers and cigarettes that had to be used without Kalin knowing. After completing it, David also got a lukanka to smuggle in the house.; On Day 16, Big Brother forbade arguing and shouting for the next days and made David "Minister of happiness". He had to make sure that everyone is feeling happy in order to return percents to the budget after the many breaches of the rules during the weekly mission.; On Day 17, one by one each of the housemates had to shoot with a paintbow gun a housemate that in their opinion does not deserve to win immunity. The last housemate left unshot was David who won immunity.; On Day 18 the housemates had to guess the mass of various objects. If they guessed higher than the real mass or were the furthest from the right answer, they would lose the game. The winner being Stefan N. won a food privilege to save the housemates in need.
Week 3	Exits	On Day 20, during the live eviction, Mihaela decided to leave voluntarily, cancelling the vote and saving Lena, who was initially voted out the house.
Week 4	Twists	On Day 24, after the face-to-face nominations, it was revealed that the public voted on their favourite housemate and that the two housemates that received the fewest votes would be automatically nominated. These two housemates were Tsvetelina and Lena.
Week 4	Nominations	On Day 24, the fourth nominations were held face-to-face. Tsvetelina, Valentin and Siyana got the most votes. At the end, it was revealed that Lena and Tsvetelina were automatically nominated after receiving the fewest votes from the public to save.
Week 4	Tasks	On Day 22, a trabant was installed in the garden and almost all of the housemates had to enter it. In the same time, Lena, David and Stefan N. had to make 30 tours of the garden, carrying a suitcase over their heads. The other housemates had to stay in the car until the tours were made. They won 30% of their next budget. This marked the beginning of the weekly mission.; On Day 22 started the weekly Hotel mission. Housemates were divided in two teams - the service personnel consisting of Stefan S., Elena, Ebru, Kalin, Tsvetan and Stefan N. and the guests of the hotel being Lena, Mina, Siyana, David, Ivan, Tsvetelina and Valentin. Later that day, David picked Siyana and Elena to switch their roles. The next day the mission ended with the guests voting whether they liked the service and the personnel voted if they liked the guests. Both teams voted with majority with "Yes", however at the end it was revealed that the mission would be complete if 50% of the guests liked the service and if 50% of the personnel disliked the guests, so the task was announced as unsuccessful.; On Day 22, Mina received a secret mission. She and Lena had to get Valentin drunk until the end of the day. Valentin debunked their task and Big Brother took 20% from their budget.; On Day 24, Stefan N. and David had to each disassemble an awning with the faster winning a call with his partner. The winner was David.; On Day 25, Big Brother held an auction, as housemates gave away their personal belongings in exchange for various products.; On Day 25, each of the housemates had to film a video during a party. After the episode was aired, the videos were published in Instagram, where David's video was the most liked, so he won 5000 Brothers (the house's currency for the budget) for personal use.
Week 4	Exits	On Day 27, Tsvetelina was evicted after receiving the fewest votes to be saved.
Week 5	Twists	On Day 29, Kalin used his superpower card which gave him immunity.; On Day 30, after being fake evicted as part of the mission, Tsvetan, Lena, Valentin and Siyana were announced as this week's nominated housemates.; On Day 31, the victims of the fake eviction chose to save Siyana, who returned to the house and chose Mina to replace her in the secret room, while also facing eviction.
Week 5	Nominations	On Day 30, after being sacrificed for the good of the mission, Tsvetan, Lena, Valentin and Siyana were sent one by one to the secret room where it was announced that they would be up for eviction. However, on the next day, the four of them were able to save one of them - they chose to save Siyana, who then returned to the house and had to send one housemate to the secret room and to the eviction - Siyana chose Mina.
Week 5	Tasks	On Day 29, disasters affected the house - after a "hurricane" passed through the house, the furniture, objects and belongings were scattered everywhere around the house and the housemates could not touch them. The second disaster was a "disease" - the housemates had to wear protective clothing and to keep distance between one another. On the next day, the house was befallen by a "flooding". In order to eliminate the consequences of a disaster, the housemates had to choose a few of them to leave the house, beside Kalin who was immune - they chose to sacrifice Tsvetan. After a "solar storm" turned off the electricity, Lena and later Valentin were sacrificed. Then there was a "fire" in the house which led to a lot of the furniture being destroyed and the housemates choosing another victim to leave - Siyana. All of the sacrificed housemates were sent to the secret room, where it was announced that they would be up for eviction.
Week 5	Exits	On Day 34, Tsvetan walked after being hospitalized and Mina was evicted after receiving the fewest votes to save.
Week 6	Twists	On Day 38, after Kalin, Ivan, Stefan N. and David discussed nominations of the girls, they were obligated to only nominate male housemates this week. Also, Stefan N. and Ivan were merged in one player - Stivan. They would nominate and be nominated together until their eviction.; On Day 38, an old phone installed in the living room ringed. Stefan N. and Ivan picked it up, when it was revealed that they would be automatically nominated. The second time it ringed Elena picked it up and was rewarded with immunity. Then, Kalin won a dessert and Valentin won the privilege to stop a housemate for voting - he chose Siyana by her will. Siyana had to choose who would get Tsvetan's superpower card - she chose herself. Ebru won a double vote.; On Day 38, Stefan N. used his superpower card, giving him and Ivan a double nomination. Ivan also used his superpower card to automatically nominate Stefan S..
Week 6	Nominations	On Day 38, the weekly nominations were held. Stefan N. & Ivan, who were automatically nominated from the phone twist were joined by Kalin and Valentin, who got the most votes. At the end. after using his superpower card, Ivan automatically nominated Stefan S..
Week 6	Tasks	On Day 36 started the Family mission - every housemate was assigned a role of a family member and had to follow the rules of each role in order to get the mission complete. Ebru and Kalin were named the grandparents, Ivan and Stefan N. were mother and father respectively, Elena and Stefan S. were aunt and uncle, Siyana and David were teenagers and the babies were Lena and Valentin. Siyana and David had to film a dancing video and to get 10 thousand likes in order to get 30% of their budget. Then Stefan N. had to secretly gather cigarettes in a box each costing plus 100 Brothers to the budget. On the next day, Elena and Ivan had to iron, fold and sort clothes for an hour with each minute off the time costing 1% of the budget, while also eating chocolates for 200 Brothers. At the end it was announced that the housemates won a luxury budget.; On Day 37, Ebru and Kalin were asked five questions. They had to choose a housemate to answer the question and also predicted the answers. If they made more than one error, they would lose 5% of the budget.; On Day 40, the housemates had to scream at a machine until a battery was full. They won a bucket with sausages.
Week 6	Exits	On Day 41, Ivan was ejected after an aggressive behaviour towards Stefan S. two days prior. Then, Kalin was voted out by the viewers vote.
Week 7	Entrances	On Day 48, Mihaela was given a second chance to return to the House after being the only housemate to walk from the show by her own will.
Week 7	Twists	On Day 42, it was revealed that each of the housemates could discuss nominations with another one of them, however the discussion could only be one-sided. Valentin could talk about nominations to Lena, Lena to Ebru, Ebru to Elena, Elena to Stefan N., Stefan N. to David, David to Siyana, Siyana to Stefan S. and Stefan S. to Valentin.; On Day 44, after winning Snakes and ladders, Ebru won immunity, however by using his superpower card, the win was given automatically to David, meaning he stole the immunity from Ebru.; On Day 44, during the nominations, it was revealed that one of the housemates was chosen as a bomb by a viewers vote - every housemate that voted for the bomb would be automatically nominated, but the bomb was not immune and could face eviction if getting the needed votes. The bomb was revealed as Siyana, meaning Elena was automatically nominated (Ebru also voted for her, but was already nominated by the housemates).
Week 7	Nominations	On Day 44, the last nominations took place. Stefan N., Stefan S. and Ebru got the most votes from the housemates. However, Elena was automatically nominated after the bomb twist where she nominated Siyana.
Week 7	Tasks	On Day 42, started the weekly task, with the theme being board games. The house was transformed into a Snakes and ladders board with 50 positions, where in some positions 600 Brothers for personal use could be won or 5% from the budget could be lost. The housemates would take turns to move their pawns with the first to get to the final position (number 50) would get immunity - the winner was Ebru. During this week, Big Brother would also challenge some of the contestants to play tic-tac-toe and if Big Brother won, he would take 5% from the budget or give 5% if he loses. The house would be also visited by unexpected guests - animals and people, however the housemates had to ignore them and not react or else 5% would be taken from the budget. Their luck was also tested with a wheel of fortune (mostly penalties) and boxes with secret reward. After losing more Brothers than they had, Elena and Stefan N. played Hangman and won, with Big Brother forgiving the debts, however the other housemates were electrocuted when a mistake was made. Another chance to get more percents for the next budget was given with Valentin having to remember a note and saying it to the housemates (who had to write it down), while wearing a cheek reactor with the result being 10% given for the budget. After, Valentin had to blow out a candle still having the cheek retractor on in order to return another 5%.; On Day 42, Lena and David played arm wrestling with a reward of 300 Brothers for personal use and a bottle of rum. After two rounds, Lena won the battle.; On Day 44, the housemates had to guess real news titles from the fake ones in order to win a bucket with sausages.; On Day 44, Elena was given a secret mission to gather all of the housemates in the Diary Room the next morning without David in order to hide. After doing so, Big Brother gave them access to the Secret Room as David was called in the Diary Room afterwards. In the same time, the housemates entered the House secretly. The mission was announced as complete with the reward being a party.; On Day 45, the housemates had to solve a tangram. For every minute that it was not solved, they would lose two cigarettes. Valentin did not play as he was the biggest anti-smoker. The result was 72 cigarettes lost because it took them 36 minutes to solve the puzzle.
Week 7	Exits	On Day 48, Ebru became the next evicted housemate.
Week 8	Twists	On Day 49, Big Brother announced that the housemates would directly eliminate one of them with a vote, however Mihaela was granted immunity. The housemates could discuss votes. After a secret auction, Siyana bought an immunity. The next day the nominations took place. Valentin refused to vote and Big Brother took the food, bedsheets and the hot water. Valentin also received the most votes, but it was announced that the nominations were fake.
Week 8	Tasks	On Day 49 started the last weekly mission "Greed and wastefulness" - this week, the housemates could by different thing in the house that would cost them a part of the final reward like food and immunity. After it was announced that there would be nominations, a secret auction was held in the Diary Room for an immunity with the one to take being Siyana who gave up 2200 lv from the reward. Then, Big Brother gave a ticket each for 200 lv for a projection of the first episode of the show - the housemates that watched the Launch Night were Lena, Elena and Siyana. Big Brother then assigned a control authority consisting of Elena, Stefan N. and Valentin - at least two of them had to agree so the housemates could buy anything. The same day, Big Brother had close people to the housemates enter the Diary Room with each housemate having to pay 2000 lv to see them. Big Brother also asked Valentin to kiss Lena on the cheek - he refused and therefore they lost 5000 lv. On the third day an auction was held with the winner getting a video call with a favorite person - Stefan N. won with only 500 lv given, however as he took more than two minutes to talk, other 2000 lv. Another auction was held for immunity with the winner being Stefan S. who gave 800 lv. In order to regain 10 000 lv, the housemates then had to march perfectly. Big Brother called Stefan N. in the Diary Room to offer him to eat a piece of cake for 2000 lv, but he declined it and then Big Brother announced that he got the fewest votes. On the fourth day, Big Brother gave the housemates nasty things to eat, however they could pass one of the food to the person sitting next starting to them for 500 lv with the next passing costing them double. The next task was precise cutting of vegetables and fruits so the totality of the halves would measure the same - Valentin did not manage to do it and lost 8300 lv. Another auction was held for immunity - after no one wanted it, Valentin got it. In the evening, Mihaela and Elena were called to the Diary Room as one of them was going to leave and the other housemates had to bet who will return in order to return 10 000 lv, however they were wrong and lost 5000 lv. On the last day of the mission, Big Brother called each one of the housemates two open two boxes - one with positive comments and one with negative. The first opening was free, but the second costed 500 lv. Then, each of the housemates was called in the Diary Room and was asked three questions about conspiracies in the house - they had to bet a part of the reward and if they got at least two right answers, the bet would be doubled and won, but if not, the money would be taken. After the last eviction, Big Brother announced that the reward would be the initially announced and that the task was fake the entire time.
Week 8	Exits	On Day 50, Lena was evicted after getting the fewest votes to be saved.; On Day 51, Stefan N. was evicted via the back door after getting the fewest votes to be saved.; On Day 52, Elena was evicted via the back door after getting the fewest votes to be saved.; On Day 53, Mihaela was evicted after getting the fewest votes to be saved.; On Day 55, on the final, Stefan S. finished in fourth place and Siyana finished in third place. At the end, Valentin was announced as the runner-up and David was left as the winner.

== Nominations table ==
	Week 1	Week 2	Week 3	Week 4	Week 5	Week 6	Week 7	Week 8	Final	Nominations received
David	Mina, Stefani	Stefani, Siyana	Lena, Mihaela	Tsvetelina, Ebru	Not eligible	Valentin, Stefan S.	Ebru, Stefan N.	No; Nominations	Winner (Day 55)	1
Valentin	Not in House	Stefani, Siyana	Lena, Ivan	Tsvetelina, Ivan	Not eligible	Kalin, Ebru	Stefan N., Elena	No; Nominations	Runner-up (Day 55)	16
Siyana	Muti, Stefani	Ivan, Tsvetan	Tsvetelina, Tsvetan	Tsvetelina, Tsvetan	Mina	Not eligible	Stefan N., Ebru	No; Nominations	Third place (Day 55)	17
Stefan S.	Elena, Tsvetelina	Ivan, Stefan N.	Tsvetelina, Mina	Tsvetelina, Mina	Not eligible	Kalin, Ebru	Stefan N., Ebru	No; Nominations	Fourth place (Day 55)	13
Mihaela	Ivan, Mina	Stefani, Siyana	Lena, Mina	Walked (Day 20)				No; Nominations	Evicted (Day 53)	6
Elena	Tsvetelina, Lena	Tsvetelina, Stefani	Lena, Kalin	Kalin, Valentin	Not eligible	Kalin, Siyana	Siyana, Stefan S.	No; Nominations	Evicted (Day 52)	6
Stefan N.	Mina, Muti	Stefan S., Siyana	Siyana, Mina	Siyana, Valentin	Not eligible	2-Valentin, 2-Stefan S., Stefan S.	Valentin, Stefan S.	No; Nominations	Evicted (Day 51)	6
Lena	Tsvetan, Elena	Elena, Kalin	Mihaela, Kalin	Kalin, Valentin	Not eligible	Siyana, Valentin	Valentin, Stefan S.	No; Nominations	Evicted (Day 50)	9
Ebru	Lena, Ivan	Kalin, Stefani	Kalin, Lena	Tsvetelina, Kalin	Not eligible	2-Kalin, 2-Siyana	Siyana, Stefan S.	Evicted (Day 48)		10
Kalin	Ebru, Muti	Stefan S., Ebru	Mihaela, Lena	Ebru, Stefan S.	Not eligible	Valentin, Stefan S.	Evicted (Day 41)			13
Ivan	Stefani, Mina	Stefan S., Siyana	Mina, Valentin	Valentin, Siyana	Not eligible	2-Valentin, 2-Stefan S., Stefan S.	Ejected (Day 41)			14
Mina	Ivan, Stefan N.	Mihaela, Stefani, Ivan	Mihaela, Siyana	Ivan, Valentin	Not eligible	Evicted (Day 34)				11
Tsvetan	Muti, David	Ivan, Stefani	Valentin, Lena	Siyana, Valentin	Not eligible	Walked (Day 34)				5
Tsvetelina	Ebru, Mina	Ivan, Elena	Ivan, Mihaela	Valentin, Siyana	Evicted (Day 27)					11
Stefani	Ivan, Muti	Ivan, Elena	Evicted (Day 13)							10
Muti	Tsvetan, Tsvetelina	Evicted (Day 6)								5
Notes	1, 2, 3	4, 5	6, 7, 8	9	10	11, 12, 13	14, 15	none		
Against public vote	~~Kalin~~, Mina, Muti	Ivan, Mihaela, Stefani, Valentin	Kalin, Lena, Mihaela, Mina	Lena, Siyana, Tsvetelina, Valentin	Lena, Mina, ~~Siyana~~, ~~Tsvetan~~, Valentin	Kalin, Stefan N. ~~& Ivan~~, ~~Stefan S.~~, Valentin	Ebru, Elena; Stefan N. Stefan S.	All; Housemates		
Walked	none		Mihaela	none	Tsvetan	none				
Ejected	none					Ivan	none			
Evicted	Muti; 26% to save	Stefani; 8% to save	Eviction; Cancelled	Tsvetelina; 5% to save	Mina; 16% to save	Kalin; 12% to save	Ebru; 7% to save	Lena; 0,9% (out of 8)	Stefan N. 1.6% (out of 7)	
Evicted	Muti; 26% to save	Stefani; 8% to save	Eviction; Cancelled	Tsvetelina; 5% to save	Mina; 16% to save	Kalin; 12% to save	Ebru; 7% to save	Elena; 3,3% (out of 6)	Mihaela; 5,1% (out of 5)	
Evicted	Muti; 26% to save	Stefani; 8% to save	Eviction; Cancelled	Tsvetelina; 5% to save	Mina; 16% to save	Kalin; 12% to save	Ebru; 7% to save	Stefan S. 6% (out of 4)	Siyana; 16% (out of 3)	
Evicted	Muti; 26% to save	Stefani; 8% to save	Eviction; Cancelled	Tsvetelina; 5% to save	Mina; 16% to save	Kalin; 12% to save	Ebru; 7% to save	Valentin; 44% (out of 2)	David; 56% to win	

=== Notes ===
- ^Note 1: During the Launch Night a viewers vote was held on the app Nova Play for the favorite housemate based on first impressions. Kalin won with 17%, but it was then revealed he was the first nominated housemate.
- ^Note 2: Siyana and Mihaela gained immunity after signing a contract to change their names in order for Siyana to becoming a Housemate and Mihaela making Big Brother help the Non-Housemates with the hygiene.
- ^Note 3: After winning the most categories in the voting, it was revealed that David's privilege was that he could save one from the nominated housemates on the first nominations. He decided to save Kalin.
- ^Note 4: Mihaela was automatically nominated by Mina due to her birthday present. Valentin was initially nominated after sabotaging his secret mission, but Stefan S. saved him with his superpower card. On the next game, after losing the cake challenge, he was nominated once again.
- ^Note 5: Lena won immunity after winning in the cake challenge.
- ^Note 6: David won immunity after being the only unshot housemate in the paintbow challenge.
- ^Note 7: Kalin had a secret mission to treat badly the housemates as the Starshina in the military task and to be nominated by the majority, so he can get an immnunity. However, as he did not receive the most votes, he was automatically nominated.
- ^Note 8: Despite Lena receiving the fewest votes to be saved, Mihaela had to decide at the end of the live eviction either Lena or she would stay in the house, stating that she would like to leave the house voluntarily earlier that day. Mihaela decided to walk from the show, saving Lena.
- ^Note 9: This week, viewers had the right to determine who the nominees would be, so Lena and Tsvetelina received an automatic nomination.
- ^Note 10: During the weekly mission, Tsvetan, Lena, Valentin and Siyana were sacrificed from the group and were sent to the secret room in order to remove the consequences of the disasters. It was later announced that they would be nominated, but Big Brother gave them the chance to save one of them, who could replace their spot at the eviction - Siyana was saved and she decided to switch with Mina.
- ^Note 11: Due to a breach of the rules made by Kalin, Ivan, Stefan N. and David, they were punished to only nominate the male housemates. Stefan N. and Ivan were also merged in one player, meaning that they would nominate and be nominated together.
- ^Note 12: After the phone twist, Stefan N. & Ivan were automatically nominated, Elena won immunity, Valentin chose to forbid Siyana from voting and Ebru won a double nomination.
- ^Note 13: Stefan N. used his superpower card, giving him and Ivan a double nomination. Ivan used his superpower card to automatically nominate Stefan S. During the live eviction, Siyana used one of her superpower cards to save Stefan S. from elimination.
- ^Note 14: David won the immunity from the Snakes and ladders game after stealing it from Ebru, who initially won the game.
- ^Note 15: Throughout the week, the viewers voted on the app Nova Play to choose a housemate who is going to be the bomb - every housemate who voted for the bomb would be automatically nominated, but in the same place the bomb was not immune and could face the eviction. The bomb was chosen to be Siyana with 23%. Elena and Ebru voted for her, but Ebru was already nominated by the housemates, so only Elena was automatically nominated.
