= VIP Brother season 2 =

VIP Brother
- Season 2
- Presented by: Niki Kanchev
- No. of days: 33
- No. of housemates: 13
- Winner: Hristina Stefanova
- Runner-up: Desislava

Release
- Original network: Nova Television
- Original release: 26 March – 27 April 2007

Season chronology
- ← Previous; Season 1 Next → Season 3

VIP Brother 2 was the second season of the celebrity version of the Bulgarian reality television show Big Brother. It was aired on Nova Television. The show started on 26 March 2007 and ended on 27 April 2007. It lasted for 33 days, 4 days longer than the previous season, because of the high ratings. The show was hosted by Niki Kanchev.

The winner was Hristina, she is the wife of the winner of Big Brother 1 Zdravko, who also participated in this season. She is also the only non-VIP housemate. Hristina won 100,000 leva.

== Housemates ==
For the first time in the history of Big Brother Bulgaria, two former Housemates entered the House again - Tihomir and Zdravko, both from Big Brother 1.

12 Housemates entered the House on Day 1, and another 1 on Day 5.

Name	Age on entry	Notability	Hometown	Day entered	Day exited	Status
Hristina Stefanova	29	Non-celebrity, Zdravko's wife	Sliven	5	33	Winner
Desi Slava	28	Singer	Radnevo	1	33	Runner-up
Niki Kitaetsa	22	Azis's husband	Sliven	1	33	3rd Place
Katerina Evro	50	Actress	Sofia	1	33	4th Place
Tihomir Georgiev	33	Big Brother 1 housemate, Veneta's partner	Sofia	1	33	5th Place
Magi Zhelyazkova	33	Model; Miss Bulgaria 2003	Sofia	1	33	6th Place
Kalin Velyov	33	Drummer	Sofia	1	29	Evicted
Zdravko Vasilev	29	Big Brother 1 winner	Primorsko	1	26	Evicted
Veneta Raykova	32	Journalist & TV host	Popovo	1	22	Evicted
Azis	29	Singer	Sliven	1	19	Walked
Rositsa Noveva	27	Heiress of a large hotel owner	Kyustendil	1	15	Evicted
Petya Pavlova	28	Singer	Sofia	1	12	Evicted
Veselin Danov	53	Municipal Councillor	Sofia	1	8	Walked

=== Azis ===
Azis (born Vasil Boyanov) is one of the most popular pop-folk singers in Bulgaria. He entered the house on Day 1 and left voluntarily on Day 19. He was the only housemate ever to be asked to enter the house again, after walking, but Azis refused. However, two years later he entered the VIP Brother 3 as a guest celebrity housemate on Day 10, where he will spend a week. Azis is the only celebrity to participate in two VIP Brother seasons so far.

=== Desi Slava ===
Desi Slava (born Desislava Doneva) is a famous pop-folk singer. She entered the house on Day 1 and finished second in the finale on Day 33. In 2015 she took part in VIP Brother All Stars 2015, where she was announced as the winner.

=== Hristina ===
Hristina Stefanova is the wife of Zdravko (the winner of Big Brother 1). Before entering the show, Zdravko proposed marriage to her. She accepted and entered the house on Day 5 with their daughter Yanitsa (who was the third child to live in the house). Surprisingly, Hristina became a winner on Day 33.

=== Kalin ===
Kalin Velyov is a musician. He entered the house on Day 1 and was the fifth evicted on Day 29, after receiving the fewest viewers' positive votes.

=== Katerina ===
Katerina Evro is an actress. Her father is Albanian and her mother is Bulgarian. She entered the house on Day 1 and finished fourth in the finale on Day 33. In 2014, she participated in Big Brother All Stars 2014, where she finished as the runner-up.

=== Magi ===
Magdalena "Magi" Zhelyazkova is a model, TV host and Miss Bulgaria 2003. She entered the house on Day 1 and finished sixth in the finale on Day 33. In 2013 ahe participated in Big Brother All Stars 2013.

=== Niki ===
Niki Kitaetsa (born Nikolay Parvanov) is Azis's husband. He entered the house on Day 1 and finished third in the finale on Day 33. He later went on to participate in Big Brother All Stars 2014, finishing fifth in the finale.

=== Petya ===
Petya Pavlova is a pop singer, writer and actress. She is from Sofia, but she lived in London, where she developed her career. She entered the house on Day 1 and was the first evicted on Day 12.

=== Rositsa ===
Rositsa Noveva is a hotel-keeper. Before his death, she was a friend of Ivan Zografski. She entered the house on Day 1 and was the second evicted on Day 15.

=== Tihomir ===
Tihomir Georgiev is a participant from Big Brother 1 and husband of Veneta. He was born in Moscow, but he lives in Sofia. Tihomir celebrated his 34th birthday in the house - on 17 April, one day after his wife's eviction. A few months after the show, he asked for divorce with Veneta. However, they reunited after a while. He entered the house on Day 1 and finished fifth in the finale on Day 33.

=== Veneta ===
Veneta Raykova is a TV host. She was also a member of the secret inquisition during the first season of VIP Brother. She entered the house on Day 1 along with her husband Tihomir (also a participant from Big Brother 1) and was the third evicted on Day 22.

=== Veselin ===
Veselin Danov is an ex-politician. He entered the house on Day 1 and left voluntarily on Day 8.

=== Zdravko ===
Zdravko Vasilev is the winner of Big Brother 1. He entered the house on Day 1, proposing marriage to his girlfriend Hristina (who told him she was pregnant during his stay in Big Brother 1) and was the fourth evicted on Day 26. Later, they both married in the house.

== Weekly summary and highlights ==
Week 1	Tasks	The housemates had to arrange themselves on the steps of fame and to decide which one of them is the most famous.
Week 1	Entrances	Hristina entered the house on Day 5 with her daughter Yanitsa.
Week 1	The wedding	Zdravko and Hristina married on Day 7. There was a big party in the house.
Week 2	Up for eviction	Petya, Zdravko and Kalin (1st nominations on Day 11) Azis, Rositsa, Zdravko, Desi Slava (2nd nominations on Day 12)
Week 2	Exits	Veselin walked on Day 8; Petya was evicted on Day 12.
Week 3	Up for eviction	Azis and Veneta (3rd nominations on Day 15) - cancelled, because Azis asked to leave Desi Slava and Veneta (4th nominations on Day 19)
Week 3	Exits	Rositsa was evicted on Day 15; Azis walked on Day 19
Week 4	Up for eviction	Zdravko, Hristina and Desi Slava (5th nominations on Day 22)
Week 4	Birthdays	Tihomir celebrated his 34th birthday on Day 23. There was a party in the house.
Week 4	Exits	Veneta was evicted on Day 22; Zdravko was evicted on Day 26
Week 5	Exits	Kalin was evicted on Day 29 Day 33 - Magi, Katerina, Tihomir, Niki and Desi Slava left the house; Hristina became a winner

== Nominations table ==
The first housemate in each box was nominated for two points, and the second housemate was nominated for one point.

	Day 11	Day 12	Day 15	Day 19	Day 22	Final		Nominations received
Hristina	Exempt	3-Azis; 2-Desi Slava, 1-Katerina	3-Azis; 1-Desi Slava	Desi Slava; Katerina	Desi Slava; Katerina	Winner (Day 33)		12
Desi Slava	Herself; Azis	3-Veneta, 2-Tihomir, 1-Rositsa	Veneta; Zdravko	Veneta; Zdravko	Zdravko; Hristina	Runner-up (Day 33)		26 (2+)
Niki	Azis, Katerina	3-Zdravko, 2-Hristina, 1-Tihomir	Zdravko, Veneta	Veneta, Zdravko	Zdravko, Hristina	Third place (Day 33)		3 (2+)
Katerina	Azis, Magi	3-Tihomir, 2-Zdravko, 1-Hristina	Veneta, Tihomir	Veneta, Tihomir	Zdravko, Hristina	Fourth place (Day 33)		16 (5+)
Tihomir	Veneta, Himself	3-Azis, 2-Desi Slava, 1-Katerina	Azis, Katerina	Katerina, Desi Slava	Desi Slava, Katerina	Fifth place (Day 33)		9 (4+)
Magi	Katerina, Azis	3-Veneta, 2-Rositsa, 1-Zdravko	Veneta, Tihomir	Veneta, Zdravko	Zdravko, Hristina	Sixth place (Day 33)		5 (3+)
Kalin	Katerina, Tihomir	3-Desi Slava, 2-Niki, 1-Rositsa	Desi Slava, Azis	Zdravko, Hristina	Zdravko, Hristina	Evicted (Day 29)		5 (1+)
Zdravko	Magi, Kalin	3-Magi, 2-Kalin, 1-Rositsa	Azis, Desi Slava	Desi Slava, Katerina	Desi Slava, Hristina	Evicted (Day 26)		33 (1+)
Veneta	Tihomir, Herself	3-Katerina, 2-Desi Slava, 1-Niki	3-Katerina, 1-Magi	Desi Slava, Katerina	Evicted (Day 22)			21 (3+)
Azis	Niki, Himself	3-Zdravko, 2-Rositsa, 1-Hristina	Zdravko, Hristina	Walked (Day 19)				14 (9+)
Rositsa	Herself, Veneta	3-Zdravko, 2-Kalin, 1-Magi	Evicted (Day 15)					7 (2+)
Petya	Azis, Zdravko	Evicted (Day 12)						1
Veselin	Walked (Day 8)							0
Notes	1	2	3, 4	none		5		
Against public vote	Kalin, Petya, Zdravko	Desi Slava, Rositsa, Azis, Zdravko	~~Azis~~, Veneta	Desi Slava, Veneta	Desi Slava, Hristina, Zdravko	All; Housemates		
Walked	Veselin	none	Azis	none				
Evicted	Petya; 48% to evict	Rositsa; 48% to evict	Eviction; Cancelled	Veneta; 73% to evict	Zdravko; 47% to evict	Kalin; Fewest votes (out of 7)	Magi; Fewest votes (out of 6)	
Evicted	Petya; 48% to evict	Rositsa; 48% to evict	Eviction; Cancelled	Veneta; 73% to evict	Zdravko; 47% to evict	Tihomir; 14.1% (out of 6)	Katerina; 15.8% (out of 6)	
Evicted	Petya; 48% to evict	Rositsa; 48% to evict	Eviction; Cancelled	Veneta; 73% to evict	Zdravko; 47% to evict	Niki; 19.2% (out of 6)	Desi Slava; Fewest votes (out of 2)	
Evicted	Petya; 48% to evict	Rositsa; 48% to evict	Eviction; Cancelled	Veneta; 73% to evict	Zdravko; 47% to evict	Hristina; Most votes to win		

=== Notes ===
- ^Note 1: To prevent conspiration, the first nominations were positive. Each housemate was also able to nominate himself/herself.
- ^Note 2: To prevent conspiration, Big Brother asked each housemate to nominate three people - with 3, 2 and 1 point.
- ^Note 3: Hristina and Veneta saved their lucky eggs, won in a daily task. This task allowed them to nominate one housemate with one extra point. Hristina nominated Azis with three points, Veneta - Katerina.
- ^Note 4: The nominations were cancelled, because Azis walked voluntarily.
- ^Note 5: The public was voting for a winner between Desi Slava, Kalin, Katerina, Niki, Magi, Tihomir and Hristina. The Housemate with the fewest votes was evicted on Day 29.
