= Big Brother All Stars 2015 =

- Season 4
- Presented by: Niki Kanchev; Aleksandra Sarchadjieva
- No. of days: 29
- No. of housemates: 8
- Winner: Desi Slava
- Runner-up: Vanja Džaferović

Release
- Original network: Nova Television
- Original release: 16 November – 14 December 2015

Series chronology
- ← Previous; Season 3 Next → Season 5

Big Brother All Stars 2015 was the fourth season of the All-Star spin-off of Big Brother and the seventeenth season of the format in Bulgaria overall. It was announced on November 13, 2015, on the official website. Followed the same air schedule as in 2012, 2013 and 2014, it commenced on Nova Television on 16 November 2015, immediately after the VIP Brother 7 finale and lasted for a month, ended on 14 December 2015. It featured housemates from previous seasons of the show, as well as participants from other reality formats. Desi Slava won with Vanja Džaferović finishing as the runner-up.

== Housemates ==
Eight housemates entered the house on Day 1, making it the season with the fewest Housemates so far.

Name	Age	Occupation	Day entered	Day exited	Status
Desi Slava VIP Brother 2 Sing With Me	36	Pop-folk & folklore singer	1	29	Winner
Vanja Džaferović Survivor 5	32	Footballer	1	29	Runner-up
Evgeni Minchev VIP Brother 6	52	PR expert	1	29	Third Place
Vanya Chervenkova VIP Brother 5	48	Businesswoman	1	29	Fourth Place
Sonya Koltuklieva VIP Brother 4	58	Journalist	1	24	Evicted
Borislav Atanasov The Mole 2	30	Volleyballer	1	22	Evicted
Katsi Vaptsarov VIP Brother 4 Your Face Sounds Familiar 2	52	TV host	1	15	Evicted
Yoana Zaharieva VIP Brother 5	38	Pop singer	1	8	Evicted

=== Borislav ===
Borislav Atanasov was a contestant from The Mole 2. He entered the House on Day 1 and was the third evicted on Day 22.

=== Desi Slava ===
Desi Slava (born Desislava Doneva) was a contestant from VIP Brother 2 where she finished second and Sing with me where she finished third. She entered the House on Day 1 and became a winner on Day 29.

=== Evgeni ===
Evgeni Minchev was a contestant from VIP Brother 6. He entered the House on Day 1 and finished third in the finale on Day 29.

=== Katsi ===
Katsi Vaptsarov was a contestant from VIP Brother 4 where he finished third and Your Face Sounds Familiar 2 where he finished second. He entered the House on Day 1 and was the second evicted on Day 15.

=== Sonya ===
Sonya Koltuklieva was a contestant from VIP Brother 4. She entered the House on Day 1 and was the fourth evicted on Day 24.

=== Vanja ===
Vanja Džaferović was a contestant from Survivor 5 where he won. He entered the House on Day 1 and finished second in the finale on Day 29.

=== Vanya ===
Vanya Chervenkova was a contestant from VIP Brother 5 where she finished third. She entered the House on Day 1 and finished fourth in the finale on Day 29.

=== Yoana ===
Yoana "Yoko" Zaharieva was a contestant from VIP Brother 5. She entered the House on Day 1 and was the first evicted on Day 8.

== Houseguests ==
=== Svetlozar ===
Svetlozar Savov "Zarko" is a MMA fighter and former boyfriend of Desi Slava. He entered the House on Day 15 and left in the finale on Day 29.

== Nominations table ==
	Week 1	Week 2	Week 3	Final		Nominations received
Desi Slava	Katsi, Evgeni	Katsi, Borislav	Vanja, Sonya	Winner (Day 29)		1
Vanja	Katsi, Evgeni	Evgeni, Katsi	Desi Slava, Sonya	Runner-up (Day 29)		2
Evgeni	Borislav, Desi Slava	Katsi, Borislav	Himself, Borislav	Third place (Day 29)		7
Vanya	Borislav, Katsi	Borislav, Katsi	Evgeni, Sonya	Fourth place (Day 29)		4
Sonya	2-Katsi, 1-Evgeni	1-Katsi, 2-Vanya	Borislav; Vanya	Evicted (Day 24)		3
Borislav	Katsi, Evgeni	Katsi, Evgeni	Vanja, Vanya	Evicted (Day 22)		8
Katsi	Borislav, Vanja	Borislav, Vanja	Evicted (Day 15)			13
Yoana	Evgeni, Katsi	Evicted (Day 8)				0
Nomination notes	1	1, 2, 3	4, 5	none		
Against public vote	Evgeni, Katsi, Yoana	Borislav, Evgeni, Katsi, Vanya	Borislav, Sonya, Vanya	All; Housemates		
Evicted	Yoana; Fewest votes to save	Katsi; Fewest votes to save	Borislav; Fewest votes to save	Sonya; Fewest votes (out of 5)	Vanya; Fewest votes (out of 4)	
Evicted	Yoana; Fewest votes to save	Katsi; Fewest votes to save	Borislav; Fewest votes to save	Evgeni; Fewest votes (out of 3)	Vanja; 35% (out of 2)	
Evicted	Yoana; Fewest votes to save	Katsi; Fewest votes to save	Borislav; Fewest votes to save	Desi Slava; 65% to win		

=== Notes ===
- ^Note 1: Because of the twist "The spheres of fortune", Borislav would be immune for the first 2 weeks in which there are nominations, but on Day 3 after being fake evicted Sonya stole the immunity for herself. She could nominate 3 people or distribute the three nomination points between two housemates. Katsi had to nominate face-to-face for each week he is in the house and Yoana had an automatic nomination for the first 2 weeks.
- ^Note 2: After she was evicted, Yoana gave immunity to Vanya.
- ^Note 3: Vanya lost immunity after her team lost the game against Sonya's team (who remained immune).
- ^Note 4: After he was evicted, Katsi gave immunity to Evgeni.
- ^Note 5: During the third and final nominations, the housemates had to first vote for who they wanted to win (the name in green) and second for who they didn't want to win (the name in black). They were not able to vote for themselves.
