= Cosara =

Town of ancient Lycia

Cosara or Kosara was a town of ancient Lycia, that appears on the Stadiasmus Patarensis.

Its site is unlocated, but it is likely in eastern Lycia north of Kitanaura.
