= Big Brother 6 (Bulgarian season) =

- Season 6
- Presented by: Bashar Rahal; Aleksandra Bogdanska
- No. of days: 54
- No. of housemates: 16
- Winner: Mario Todorov
- Runner-up: Georgi Markov
- No. of episodes: 43

Release
- Original network: Nova Television
- Original release: 8 October – 30 November 2024

Season chronology
- ← Previous; Season 5 Next → Season 7

Big Brother 6 is the sixth season of the Bulgarian reality television series Big Brother, and the twenty-third season of the format overall. The series launch on Nova Television on 8 October 2024, nine years after the last regular season of the format since Big Brother 5 and six years after Big Brother: Most Wanted 2018.

== Background ==
The promo for the new season began airing on Nova Television on January 27, 2024. Bashar Rahal and Aleksandra Bogdanska (who was a housemate in VIP Brother 9) are the main presenters.

== Housemates ==
16 Housemates entered the House.

Name	Age on entry	Occupation	Residence	Day entered	Day exited	Status
Mario Todorov	34	Hairdresser and former priest	Sofia	0	54	Winner
Georgi Markov	38	Pop-folk singer	Karlukovo	0	54	Runner-up
Georgi Trifonov	22	Businessman	Montana	0	54	Third Place
Vanessa Georgieva	29	Businessowner and law student	Pleven	0	54	Fourth Place
Radostin Tsonev	49	Businessman and restaurant owner	Sofia	0	52	Evicted
Atija Barzev	29	Waitress	Stroudsburg, PA	0	51	Evicted
Yvonne Tihina	50	Actress	Monaco City	0	50	Evicted
Plamen Gardev	58	DJ	Chicago	0	49	Evicted
Veselka Marinova	24	Plus sized model and cashier	Botevgrad	0	48	Evicted
Viktor Angelov	29	Fitness trainer	Burgas	0	47	Evicted
Teodora Yaneva "Beba"	25	Makeup artist and former gymnast	Sofia	0	40	Evicted
Petar Grishev "Agent Enigma"	35	Bartender	Vratsa	0	33	Evicted
Kosara Koleva	29	Tattoo artist and rapper	Sofia	0	19	Evicted
Kristie Kirilova	25	Actress and model	Sofia	0	12	Evicted
Andjela Tasheva	24	Erotic model	Varna	0	8	Walked
Nikolay Kunev	23	Food delivery man	Sofia	0	5	Evicted

=== Andjela ===
Andjela Tasheva is from Varna. She entered the House on Day 0 and had to walk out of the house on Day 8 due to health issues.

=== Atija ===
Atija Barzev is from Stroudsburg, PA. She entered the House on Day 0 and was evicted on Day 51.

=== Georgi M. ===
Georgi Markov is from Karlukovo. He entered the House on Day 0 and finished second at the final on Day 54.

=== Georgi T. ===
Georgi Trifonov is from Montana but lived in Milan for many years. He was chosen by the public to enter the House on Day 0 and finished third at the final on Day 54.

=== Kosara ===
Kosara Koleva is from Sofia. She entered the House on Day 0 and became the third evicted housemate on Day 19.

=== Kristie ===
Kristie Kirilova is from Sofia. She entered the House on Day 0 and became the second evicted on Day 12.

=== Mario ===
Mario Todorov is from Sofia. He entered the House on Day 0 and became the winner at the final on Day 54.

=== Nikolay ===
Nikolay Kunev is from Sofia. He entered the House on Day 0 and was the first evicted on Day 5.

=== Petar ===
Petar Grishev is from Vratsa but lives in Tenerife. He entered the House on Day 0 as the people's housemate, dubbed "Agent Enigma" and was fake evicted on Day 26, but after the housemates voted, he was brought back to the house and was later evicted again on Day 33. The public was asked to control his decisions online in Nova Play.

=== Plamen ===
Plamen Gardev is from Chicago. He is the father of reality star Aleksandra Gardeva. He entered the House on Day 0 and was evicted on Day 49.

=== Radostin ===
Radostin Tsonev is from Sofia. He entered the House on Day 0 and was evicted on Day 52.

=== Teodora ===
Teodora Yaneva "Beba" is from Sofia. She entered the House on Day 0 and became the fifth evicted housemate on Day 40.

=== Vanessa ===
Vanessa Georgieva is from Pleven but has lived in Sofia for ten years. She entered the House on Day 0 and finished fourth at the final on Day 54.

=== Veselka ===
Veselka Marinova is from Botevgrad. She entered the House on Day 0 and was evicted on Day 48 via the backdoor.

=== Viktor ===
Viktor Angelov is from Burgas. He entered the House on Day 0 and was evicted on Day 47.

=== Yvonne ===
Yvonne Tihina is from Monaco City. She entered the House on Day 0 and was evicted on Day 50.

== Weekly summary ==
The main events in the Big Brother 6 house are summarised in the table below.

Week 1	Entrances	On Day 0, Atija, Andjela, Nikolay, Viktor, Teodora, Georgi M., Yvonne, Plamen, Vanessa, Radostin, Veselka, Mario, Petar, Kristie, Kosara and Georgi T. entered the house.
Week 1	Twists	On Day 0, Petar entered the show as "Agent Enigma" - the public would control his decisions during his stay.; On Day 0, Atija was announced as the first nominated due to her losing in "Hide and Seek". Georgi M. was later automatically nominated by Kosara. Petar gained immunity and was announced as the only housemate, who could nominate this week.; On Day 1, after Georgi M. was automatically nominated to face the first eviction by Kosara, Big Brother revealed that he would have the chance to save himself if he was not ranked least entertaining in the next task. He ultimately was not ranked least entertaining in the task and was saved from eviction.; On Day 3, Atija was saved as she lasted the longest in the bed task.
Week 1	Nominations	On Day 3 the first nominations took place, but this week only Petar could nominate. It was face to face nominations. As only one person nominated, Nikolay and Veselka faced the eviction with Andjela, who was automatically nominated.
Week 1	Punishements	On Day 1, Andjela told Petar, that the whole house watched him in the Diary Room, where it was revealed that only he would nominate this week. As that was supposed to be hidden from him, Andjela was automatically nominated.
Week 1	Tasks	On Day 0, housemates played various party games. First, they played "Hide and Seek," where Georgi M. found Atija first, making her the first nominated. Next was "Musical Statues," where Vanessa was named the house pet after moving first. Afterward, they played "Pass the Parcel," revealing prizes and questions. Radostin won a trip to Dubai for two. Yvonne chose Nikolay as the worst dressed, causing him to lose his suitcase. Kosara picked Georgi M. as the most boring, making him the second to face public voting. Petar gained immunity and chose his suitcase over the others. Mario selected Georgi T. as the housemate he'd least want to share a bed with, forcing Georgi T. to sleep on the floor.; On Day 1, Vanessa's task as the house's dog started. She couldn't talk and for every breach several percents will be taken from the weekly budget.; On Day 1, housemates took part in a task where they would rank each other based on various characteristics. However, Georgi M. was given a secret mission to save himself if he wasn't ranked in the bottom three for least entertaining. His task was accomplished.; On Day 2 started the weekly budget task. Housemates had to wear gloves which prevents them from using their hands. For each breach several percents from the budget will be taken. If a housemate report a breach, the informator will be rewarded.; On Day 3, housemates took part in a task where they had to last the longest laying on an oversized bed. As Atija lasted the longest, she was saved from eviction.
Week 1	Exits	On Day 5, Nikolay became the first evicted housemate.
Week 2	Nominations	On Day 9, the second nominations were held. Georgi M., Kristie, Petar and Vanessa received the most nominations and faced eviction this week.
Week 2	Punishements	On Day 6, Kosara told some of the housemates to nominate her. As this is a breach of the rules, the next day it was announced that Kosara couldn't be nominated for this week.
Week 2	Tasks	On Day 7, the weekly task started and the housemates were split in two teams - the men were named team Yunatsi and the women were named team Samodivi. Aside from that, Georgi M., Teodora and Veselka were named the Zmei and were connected by a belt, forcing them to move together. Team Yunatsi had to fulfill all the wishes of team Samodivi, who had to protect their wreaths from team Yunatsi. The male team also had to pick golden apples falling from a tree and hide them, while the Zmei had to stop team Yunatsi to get all apples. Team Yunatsi had to collect three or more apples, so the task would be accomplished. The next day, team Yunatsi had five apples and the mission was announced as successfully completed.; On Day 7, Radostin had a secret mission - he had to choose one of the girls to cut the belt, connecting the Zmei together. He choose Atija. This task was also completed and the housemates won a luxury budget.; On Day 9, before the nominations was held a game. There were big ice cubes with a coin in each and the housemate who gets the coin out without breaking the ice would win immunity. The winner was Viktor, who was safe from eviction.; On Day 10, Big Brother installed a "Venting Machine" in which the housemates had to vent their frustrations and had to scream in order to win either a food or a drink.
Week 2	Exits	On Day 8, due to bad medical condition, Andjela had to leave the house to recover.; On Day 12, Kristie became the second evicted housemate.
Week 3	Twists	On Day 16, as Mario wasn't picked in any team for the daily task, he was announced as the first nominated.; On Day 17, after winning the question game for the nominated housemates, Petar was safe from this week's eviction.
Week 3	Nominations	On Day 16, the third nominations took place. Georgi M., Kosara, Mario and Petar received the most votes and therefore faced the public vote.
Week 3	Punishements	On Day 16, Georgi M. told some housemates that he thinks Petar will nominate him. This being a breach of the rules, Georgi M. had a round shot tied up his leg.
Week 3	Tasks	On Day 14, the new weekly task started - the housemates should not have gained more weight. Petar was given a secret mission - he would have to gain weight as the public voted in the Nova Play app. As Veselka, Radostin, Atija and Viktor weighed the most, they had to complete a race, where they were wrapped up in stretch foil and had to move like worms. At the start of the mission, the total weight of the housemates was 1020 kg and at the edn of the mission - 1005 kg, making the housemates winning a luxury budget. At the final, after losing the most weight, Yvonne was granted immunity.; On Day 14, as Viktor and Atija lost at the worm race, they had to walk 100 km in total on the treadmill. If they failed, Big Brother would take 50% from the budget, whether a luxury or economy. Viktor and Atija completed the task successfully.; On Day 14, Viktor was given a secret mission - he had to ignore Teodora and not say a word to her until the day of nominations. As a reward, he would get her immunity. However, as some of the housemates figured out that he had a mission, the mission was announced as unsuccessfully.; On Day 15, Mario, Teodorsa, Yvonne, Georgi T. and Radostin had to put on sport short without using their hands. If not everyone had put their shorts on for 10 minutes, 20% would be taken from the budget. For every touch with hands on the shorts, 20% would be taken. The mission was announced as completed without any penalties.; On Day 15, Teodora was given an opposite secret mission to the one Viktor had - she had to convince Viktor to talk to her. If she managed to do so, she would win him immunity. Her mission was also unsuccessfully.; On Day 16, Viktor and Atija had to make two teams. The housemate, who was unpicked would be the first nominated. Viktor choose Teodora, Petar, Plamen, Georgi T. and Vanessa and Atija choose Radostin, Yvonne, Kosara, Georgi M. and Veselka, making Mario the first nominated for this week. Each team had ten oranges, that they had to carry with their legs. The winning team would control the budget. If neither of the teams won, 20% from the budget would've been taken. Apparently, team Atija won the game with 8-7 oranges.; On Day 17, Atija had a secret mission. She was given the answers to a question game, happening later that day and she needed to hand the answers to Petar, so he can win the game and save himself from possible eviction.; On Day 17, a question game was held for the nominated housemates, who had to get a coin first in order to answer a question. The housemate with the most right answers would save himself from this week's eviction. The winner was Petar, who was safe this week.
Week 3	Exits	On Day 19, Kosara became the third evicted housemate.
Week 4	Twists	On Day 21, Atija and Yvonne were announced as the only nominating housemates this week, due to them being "Queen Ants". They choose to nominate Georgi T. and Georgi M. respectfully.; On Day 21, after Georgi M.'s successful coup and due to him dethroning Yvonne, he won immunity and Yvonne was automatically nominated.
Week 4	Nominations	On Day 21, Atija and Yvonne as Queen Ants had to nominate one housemate from their teams face to face. Atija nominated Georgi T. and Yvonne nominated Georgi M. After Georgi M.'s coup on Yvonne, the former became immune and the later was automatically nominated.; On Day 22, the nominations continued. As the new Queen Ant, Georgi M. nominated Petar.; On Day 23, after winning in the puzzle task, Atija won the right to nominate another housemate, no matter from which colony. She nominated Teodora face to face.
Week 4	Punishements	On Day 23, Georgi M. told Viktor and Teodora that if he nominated, the last housemate to face the eviction would be Vanessa. As this is a breach of the rules, he was sent to sit in a little cage in the garden.
Week 4	Tasks	On Day 21, housemates took part in their next shopping task, in which the Big Brother house was transformed into an ant kingdom. Housemates were split into two colonies: The blue colony consisting of Mario, Yvonne, Petar, Viktor, Teodora and Georgi M., and the red colony consisting of Radostin, Veselka, Georgi T., Atija, Plamen and Vanessa. Each team had to appoint a "Queen Ant" to lead their colony, and chose Yvonne and Atija respectively. The ants had to walk on certain paths and had to call the queens "your highness". For each breach 5% of the budget would be taken. Only the queens could nominate this week. The teams had to collect eggs. The colony with more eggs would make the shopping list for the week. There was a mini game where the queens had their eyes covered and had to hit with a toy hammer the ants from the other team in a little circle and the two queens managed to win each one egg. At the final of the task, the red teams had 10 eggs and the blue had 2, making the red colony winners. The ants from the blue colony had to fast except for water the next day. They would also take cold water showers in an interval chosen by Big Brother. Also smoking was prohibited for two days.; On Day 21, Georgi M. had to dethrone Yvonne as the Queen Ant. If he managed to do so, he would be immune for this week, Yvonne would be automatically nominated and 40% of the budget would be restored after the many breaches of the weekly task. His mission was announced as completed.; On Day 22, Atija and Georgi M. choose from their colonies Radostin, Veselka and Georgi T. for the red colony and Petar, Viktor and Mario for the blue colony to participate in a game, where they had to hold big mockups of food with outstretched arms. When someone got tired, he could give his mockup to other player from his team. As the last one standing, Georgi T. won for the red colony.; On Day 23, both colonies had to solve a puzzle in the least time possible. Each Queen Ant, behind a glass wall and the ant colonies wearing headphones, were unable hear each other. But the Queens could see the finished puzzle designed. The colony that solved it first their Queen would solely control the budgets and she would also nominate another housemate regardless the colony. Also if both colonies solved the puzzle summarily under 15 minutes, they would win a middle budget, due to the many breaches in the task. The red colony again won and Atija had the right to nominate. The mission was announced as successfully completed, as the summarily time for both teams was 14 and half minutes.; On Day 24, Plamen had to forego an hour without saying "no" in order for Petar, Mario, Teodora or Viktor to have lifted the smoking ban. The other housemates had a mission to have Plamen say "no". He chooses Petar. If secondary plan succeeded, all the bans would be lifted and they would receive fresh fish. Neither of the missions were successful.; On Day 24, Teodora had to quit smoking for a week, so the housemates could get some fish for dinner.; On Day 24, housemates were asked much discussed questions in society. They had to choose whether they are for or against the theories.; On Day 24, housemates played word association.
Week 4	Exits	On Day 26, Petar was fake evicted. However, the housemates were told about his "Agent Enigma" mission and had to decide whether to return him in the house or not. If he returned, his "Agent Enigma" mission would be over.
Week 5	Twists	On Day 28, Big Brother told the housemates about Petar's fake eviction and his "Agent Enigma" mission. Petar returned to the house and the housemates had to vote whether they want him to stay or to leave the house. Petar had 12 hours to convince them to stay in the house. Ultimately, after a 7 to 4 votes, he stayed in the house.
Week 5	Nominations	On Day 30, the fifth nominations took place. However, housemates nominated face to face. At the end, Petar, Mario and Vanessa received the most nominations faced the eviction for this week.
Week 5	Punishements	On Day 33, after Viktor and Teodora discussed how they gave Atija enough airtime and that they are going to "shoot" at her, which would be understood as nomination discussion, they had to suffer a punishment - Viktor had to shave his beard and Teodora had to gave out all her makeup and hair extensions. If they hadn't do it, they would get automatic nominations for the next week. As Teodora declined to follow the instructions, she was automatically nominated for the next week and also the hot water was turned off.
Week 5	Tasks	On Day 28, Petar was brought back to the house after staying for two days in the secret room. He had to carry a massive wooden cross until the final of the weekly task.; On Day 28, the housemates played a dice game. Everyone passed in a row, throwing a dice once at a turn. The first housemate to throw all the numbers from 1 to 6 would win a big advantage for the weekly task. The winner was Mario.; On Day 28, the new weekly task started. Each housemate had 24 hours, which played the role of exchange currency. Only Mario started with 18 hours, as he won in the dice game. They had to waste all of their time, while also trading hours with other housemates. The housemates also couldn't sleep until their time ended. Vanessa was chosen as the only one, who won't participate - she could sleep whenever she wanted and also could order special food, that she couldn't share with other housemates. Big Brother offered various products for which he added time to the person who took them. In the living room there was also a spinning wheel, which everyone would be called to turn, with different additions and withdrawals from each housemate's time.; On Day 29, Petar and Teodora had to stay in a box and had to leave in exactly one hour. They would measure the time only by counting. If they left the box with maximum 5 minutes difference from the set time, 2 hours would be taken from each housemate's timer, if not two hours would be added to each timer. They stayed for 1 hour and 34 minutes, making the task incompleted.; On Day 30, the housemates had to hold a huge round clock with one handle for each housemate. The last one to stay holding it would win immunity. Georgi M. was announces as the winner.; On Day 30, Georgi M., had to recitate different poems for half an hour, so he can restore 5% from the budget, which were taken from him, because he fell asleep during the day.; On Day 31, Radostin and Veselka were picked by the housemates as the most responsible. For 1 hour, they had to count money. At the end, if the counting result was correct, they would win a basket of sausages. However, if they answer is off by even 1 dime, they would have to return 10 packs of flour. However, they were off by 1 lev at the end, making the mission unsuccessful.
Week 5	Exits	On Day 33, Petar became the fourth evicted housemate.
Week 6	Twists	On Day 36, Teodora had to nominate two housemates and she choose Vanessa and Atija. The hackers told them to back their bags and leave the house, however it was fake nomination and fake eviction and the two girls were sent to the secret room where they could watch what happens in the house. The next day, they returned to the house.
Week 6	Nominations	On Day 37, the sixth nominations were held. Mario and Viktor received the most nominations and joined the automatically nominated Teodora for facing this week's eviction.
Week 6	Punishements	On Day 36, after Viktor kicked a stool during the last live eviction, he had to carry it everywhere and had to show it love.; On Day 36, Plamen had to wear a candle costume, after the men wore dresses to show solidarity to him wearing one, without asking leader Teodora.
Week 6	Tasks	On Day 34, the new weekly task started in which a haker group took over Big Brother. All the furniture, dishes and food were taken and the power was turned off in the kitchen. The housemates had to follow all requests of the hackers, like giving out something personal or wearing a type of dress, so they can return some of their stuff. Viktor was named the leader of the house and after a signal, he had to gather all the housemates in the garden and arrange them in the shape shown on the TV and had to make them say "I obey you", but if that didn't happen something would be taken from the house. A phone was installed in the living room and when it called, a housemate had to answer it immediately, but a different one each time. The contestants had to search for a 4 digit code through a game of bulls and cows. Later, Viktor choose Teodora as his helper, with the latter becoming the new leader two days later. The hackers would create big messes and the housemates had to clean them as fast as possible. Three days after the start of the mission, the code was guessed and Big Brother regained control to the house and rewarded housemates with full budget.; On Day 36, housemates celebrated Plamen's birthday, but each one had installed bracelets, delivering a weak electric shock. In the secret room, Atija and Vanessa were asked couple times to choose whether they or another housemate would receive a shock.; On Day 37, Atija and Vanessa had to sneak in the house and steal a bucket full of sausages and the toothbrushes from the house without anyone seeing them. If the mission was successful, they would return to the house with immunity.; On Day 38, Big Brother told 10 statements about the housemates. Some of theme were true, some of theme - false. Housemates had to hold up a yes or no sign. The majority's answer was taken. At the end, if the housemates managed to guess at least 4 statements, they would win a prise. They guessed correctly 9 of them.; On Day 38, housemates discussed stereotypes about the men and the women and whether they agree with them or not.
Week 6	Exits	On Day 40, Teodora became the fifth evicted housemate.
Week 7	Nominations	On Day 44, the last nominations, which were face to face, took place. Housemates had to kiss their nominees. Georgi M., Mario, Vanessa and Viktor received the most nominations and faced this week eviction.
Week 7	Tasks	On Day 41, the new weekly tas started. After a signal, all the housemates had to gather immediately on a little dancefloor placed on part of the house, shown on the TV and had to dance until the music stopped. They had to wear crazy costumes.; On Day 42, Georgi M. had to convince all housemates without Plamen to ignore the next dance signal so Plamen goes alone on the shown place. If doing so, the lost percents from the budget would be restored and the housemates would receive a bucket full of sausages. Unfortunately, his mission was unsuccessful.; On Day 42, housemates had to demonstrate their best kiss on a perspex screen in the diary room. Then the housemates had to vote for the two best kissers. Yvonne and Plamen were chosen.; On Day 42, after being chosen as the best kissers, Yvonne and Plamen were taken to the secret room, where they had to dance for many hours, until next notice. The budget depended on them and no matter how the other housemates dealt with the task, the two couldn't sit nor lie on the floor, because the mission would be unsuccessful. The total time was 6 hours and at the final, they won a luxury budget.; On Day 43, each housemate was assigned a big balloon, which had to be protected so they can't be popped, in order to receive ice cream. The mission would be announced as successful if at the end of they 6 or more balloons were not popped.; On Day 43, Georgi T. had a secret mission. He had to pop 5 balloons and would get ice cream for the housemates. He had to choose a helper and he picked Radostin. Their balloons had to stay unpopped. Georgi T. popped his balloon, however he got second chance. The mission was not complete with 6 unpopped balloons after the sunset.; On Day 44, housemates had to rank each other based on finances, with them comparing themself with the previous contestant. At the end, Georgi T., Radostin and Plamen were named the most rich and won ice cream that they couldn't share.; On Day 45, housemates had to put different labels, matching the housemates. Each housemate picked 2 etiquettes and had to put them on a housemate that they think is fitting these words.
Week 7	Exits	On Day 47, Viktor became the sixth evicted housemate.
Week 8	Tasks	On Day 48, the fear week started. Housemates had 10 minutes in total for video calls with everyone's family. Big Brother would scare and provoke the housemates and if they passed the tests, they would receive bonus time for online meetings with their families. Veselka started as she had to find three keys, buried in aquairums, filled with gross things, to add 2 bonus minutes and to unlock a box with a letter from her parents, in which was also written that she received the fewest public votes and had to leave the house. The next day, Mario had 5 minutes to shoot 12 balloons, each worth 15 bonus seconds, with an automatic rifle, however between them Atija had to stay without moving. Later, Plamen was informed that a clown was gonna enter the house, however the housemates would wear eye masks and would have to keep them on their eyes, and Plamen would have to make terrified sounds, so at least one housemate removes his mask, but at the task time he didn't manage to do so and after revealing that the housemates won a party, Plamen was announced as the housemate with the least votes and had to leave the house. On the third day of the task, Georgi M. and Radostin had to carry glasses wine with wine like waiters to fill a tube, with 5 markers, each being equal to 1 bonus minute, while wearing bracelets with a weak electric shock. Later that day a quiz about the season was held and each housemate answered a question, but for each false answer something from the budget of the house was cut, meanwhile with the last question it was revealed that Yvonne was leaving the house after receiving the least votes to save. On the fourth day, Vanessa and Georgi T. had the same task as Veselka, but this time with six aquariums, filled with gross things, with each right answer being worth 10 bonus seconds. After this mission, Georgi M. was called in the Diary Room and was told that Atija was going to be evicted and he had to hide it from her, while everything was shown to the housemates, who were informed that Georgi M. was going to be evicted and had to hide it from her, which was for confusing Atija, as every other housemate was then informed in the diary room one by one that Atija would be evicted. At the end of the day, during a special ritual, Atija left the house after receiving the least votes. On the fifth day, housemates had to make a horror movie with Georgi T. as producer and Georgi M. as director and screenwriter. Later, the smokers in the house had to eat gross food, with each eaten plate worth a cigarette. That evening, the housemates had to enter each in a coffin and after they were told to escape, they discovered Radostin has left the house after receiving the least votes.
Week 8	Exits	On Day 48, Veselka became the seventh housemate to be evicted, via the back door, after receiving the fewest votes to save.; On Day 49, Plamen became the eighth housemate to be evicted, after receiving the fewest votes to save.; On Day 50, Yvonne became the ninth housemate to be evicted, after receiving the fewest votes to save.; On Day 51, Atija became the tenth housemate to be evicted, after receiving the fewest votes to save.; On Day 52, Radostin became the eleventh housemate to be evicted, after receiving the fewest votes to save.; On Day 54, at the final, Vanessa finished in fourth place. Georgi T. finished in third place. Mario was announced as the winner, leaving Georgi M. as the runner-up.

== Nominations table ==
	Week 1	Week 2	Week 3	Week 4	Week 5	Week 6	Week 7	Week 8	Final	Nominations received
Mario	Not eligible	Petar, Veselka	Petar, Plamen	Not eligible	Viktor, Plamen	Atija, Veselka	Georgi M., Plamen	No; Nominations	Winner (Day 54)	17
Georgi M.	Not eligible	Plamen, Teodora	Petar, Viktor	Petar	Petar, Vanessa	Viktor, Mario	Plamen, Viktor	No; Nominations	Runner-up (Day 54)	22
Georgi T.	Not eligible	Georgi M., Kristie	Kosara, Georgi M.	Not eligible	Teodora, Mario	Viktor, Georgi M.	Georgi M., Mario	No; Nominations	Third place (Day 54)	2
Vanessa	Not eligible	Mario, Kristie	Kosara, Radostin	Not eligible	Teodora, Viktor	Viktor, Mario	Yvonne, Viktor	No; Nominations	Fourth place (Day 54)	14
Radostin	Not eligible	Kristie, Georgi M.	Georgi M., Petar	Not eligible	Petar, Vanessa	Georgi M., Atija	Georgi M., Atija	No; Nominations	Evicted (Day 52)	3
Atija	Not eligible	Kristie, Vanessa	Plamen, Vanessa	Georgi T., Teodora	Mario, Veselka	Viktor, Mario	Viktor, Vanessa	No; Nominations	Evicted (Day 51)	4
Yvonne	Not eligible	Kristie, Vanessa	Georgi M., Petar	~~Georgi M.~~	Petar, Mario	Mario, Viktor	Vanessa, Mario	No; Nominations	Evicted (Day 50)	2
Plamen	Not eligible	Kristie, Georgi M.	Georgi M., Petar	Not eligible	Petar, Mario	Georgi M., Mario	Georgi M., Mario	No; Nominations	Evicted (Day 49)	6
Veselka	Not eligible	Kristie, Petar	Kosara, Petar	Not eligible	Petar, Mario	Viktor, Mario	Georgi M., Yvonne	No; Nominations	Evicted (Day 48)	6
Viktor	Not eligible	Georgi M., Kristie	Georgi M., Kosara	Not eligible	Mario, Vanessa	Vanessa, Georgi M.	Georgi M., Vanessa	Evicted (Day 47)		12
Teodora	Not eligible	Georgi M., Kristie	Georgi M., Kosara	Not eligible	Vanessa, Georgi T.	Vanessa, Atija	Evicted (Day 40)			5
Petar Agent Enigma	Nikolay, Veselka	Kristie, Mario	Kosara, Georgi M.	Not eligible	Veselka, Radostin	Evicted (Day 33)				15
Kosara	~~Georgi M.~~	Teodora, Vanessa	Vanessa, Veselka	Evicted (Day 19)						6
Kristie	Not eligible	Radostin, Petar	Evicted (Day 12)							10
Andjela	Not eligible	Walked (Day 8)								0
Nikolay	Not eligible	Evicted (Day 5)								1
Notes	1, 2	2, 3	2, 4, 5	6	7, 8	9	none			
Against public vote	~~Atija~~, ~~Georgi M.~~, Andjela, Nikolay, Veselka	Georgi M., Kristie, Petar, Vanessa	Georgi M., Kosara, Mario, ~~Petar~~	~~Georgi M.~~, Georgi T., Petar, Teodora, Yvonne	Mario, Petar, Vanessa	Mario, Teodora, Viktor	Georgi M., Mario, Vanessa, Viktor	All; Housemates		
Walked	none	Andjela	none							
Evicted	Nikolay; 22% to save	Kristie; 15% to save	Kosara; 13% to save	No eviction	Petar; 22% to save	Teodora; 10% to save	Viktor; 9% to save	Veselka; 0.3% (out of 9)	Plamen; 1% (out of 8)	
Evicted	Nikolay; 22% to save	Kristie; 15% to save	Kosara; 13% to save	No eviction	Petar; 22% to save	Teodora; 10% to save	Viktor; 9% to save	Yvonne; 3% (out of 7)	Atija; 6% (out of 6)	
Evicted	Nikolay; 22% to save	Kristie; 15% to save	Kosara; 13% to save	No eviction	Petar; 22% to save	Teodora; 10% to save	Viktor; 9% to save	Radostin; 7% (out of 5)	Vanessa; 9% (out of 4)	
Evicted	Nikolay; 22% to save	Kristie; 15% to save	Kosara; 13% to save	No eviction	Petar; 22% to save	Teodora; 10% to save	Viktor; 9% to save	Georgi T. 17% (out of 3)	Georgi M. 44% (out of 2)	
Evicted	Nikolay; 22% to save	Kristie; 15% to save	Kosara; 13% to save	No eviction	Petar; 22% to save	Teodora; 10% to save	Viktor; 9% to save	Mario; 56% to win		

=== Notes ===
- ^Note 1: Atija was nominated, because she lost in "Hide and Seek" at the Launch Night, but was later saved after the bed task. Georgi M. was nominated after being chosen as the most boring housemate by Kosara, but was saved after the ranking task. Petar gained immunity and the power to be the only housemate to nominate the first week from one of the presents in "Pass the Parcel" at the Launch Night. Andjela was nominated for revealing to Petar that all the housemates watched him in the Diary Room, where he was announced as the only housemate to nominate this week.
- ^Note 2: As a part of his Agent Enigma mission, Petar's votes were decided by a public vote held on the NOVA Play app.
- ^Note 3: Kosara gained immunity due to her convincing other housemates to nominate her. Viktor was rewarded immunity as he won the task with the ice cubes.
- ^Note 4: Yvonne was granted immunity after losing the most weight in the weekly task. Mario was nominated, after not being chosen in neither of the teams in the game with the oranges.
- ^Note 5: As they were nominated, Georgi M., Kosara, Mario and Petar played a question game. Petar was the winner and saved himself from possible eviction.
- ^Note 6: Atija and Yvonne were the only nominating housemates due to them being "Queen Ants", but after Georgi M. got nominated, he had a mission to dethrone Yvonne as the Queen. He did it and gained immunity, while Yvonne was automaticcaly nominated. However, no one was evicted as it was fake eviction and Petar was sent to a secret room.
- ^Note 7: After being fake evicted, Petar returned to the house two days later. The housemates were told about his "Agent Enigma" mission and had to decide whether they wanted him to stay or leave the house. With 7 to 4 votes, Petar remained in the game.
- ^Note 8: Georgi M. received immunity after winning in the huge clock task.
- ^Note 9: Teodora was automatically nominated, due to her not facing the punishment after discussing with Viktor to nominate Atija.
