= Smiljana Knez =

Slovenian diplomat (born 1962)

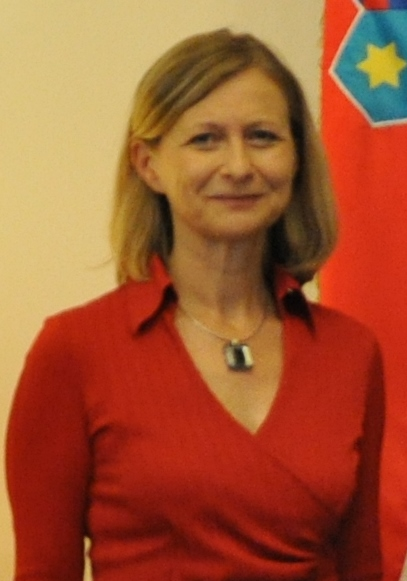
Smiljana Knez in 2016

Smiljana Knez (born 2 January 1962) is a Slovenian diplomat and Ambassador-at-Large for Climate Diplomacy. From August 2019 to December 2022 she served as a Foreign Policy Advisor of the President of the Republic of Slovenia. She was posted as Slovenia's Ambassador to Croatia (Feb 2016 - July 2019) and to the Czech Republic (Feb 2011 - Feb 2015). Before that (from 2006 - 2011 and again in 2015), she was a Human Rights Director in the Ministry of Foreign Affairs in Slovenia. In 2008, during Slovenia's Presidency to the Council of the European Union, she chaired the EU Working Group on Human Rights (COHOM). In 2010 she led the Slovenian delegation at the presentation of the Periodic report of Slovenia on the implementation of the Convention on Elimination of Racial Discrimination.

She joined Slovenia's Ministry of Foreign Affairs in 1992 and since then held a number of different roles: among others she served as deputy Ambassador to the Czech Republic (1996 - 2000) and the United Kingdom (2002 - 2006).

Smiljana Knez graduated from Sociology at Ljubljana University in 1985, obtained her MA at King's College London in 2006, and PhD at Ljubljana University in 2013.

In 2022, she was awarded “Grande Ufficiale dell’Ordine al Merito de la Republica Italiana” (2nd class / Grand Officer Order of Merit of the Italian Republic).
