= Dobrila Glavinić Knez Milojković =

Serbian journalist

Dobrila Glavinić Knez Milojković

Dobrila Glavinić Knez Milojković (1900–1987) was a Serbian journalist and humanitarian worker.

== Biography ==
Milojković was born in Belgrade. Her father, Dobroslav Knez Milojković, was the first Serbian state chemist, a writer of the Serbian Pharmacopoeia, a long-term manager of the state chemical laboratory in Belgrade, a prominent public worker and journalist. Her mother, Kosara, was born in Belgrade, the daughter of Živana and Mihajlo Kostić's "Albanese", whose ancestor ran the Albania tavern in Terazije. Her mother died young and Milojković grew up with her paternal aunt and her husband Jovan Nestorović, a state counsellor. She also had a close relationship with her paternal aunt, Serbian writer Jelena Dimitrijević.

She finished elementary school in Belgrade and high school in Switzerland. She attended classes in German, French and Italian. She studied at the Social Women's School in Lucerne and she also studied music and painting.

After finishing school abroad, Milojković returned to Serbia. She soon met Milan Glavinić, with whom she eloped and married in 1923. Glavinić was the son of Konstantin "Kosta" Glavinić, an engineer and professor at the Velika škola in Belgrade.

=== Humanitarian work ===
During her working life, Milojković was the secretary of the "Princess Ljubica" society. She performed this duty very conscientiously and devotedly, especially helping them work on the restoration of Serbian shrines. Thus, it was noted that Dobrila worked on the construction of the "House of Mercy" and the church in Stimlje. At the same time, he became a great benefactor of the society "Princess Ljubica", and he was the founder of the society "Princess Ljubica" in Aleksinac and an associate in the completion of the Autocratic Church in Kosovo and the church in Ferizaj. In 1923 she organized an exhibition of her artistic works, and donated money from purchased paintings to a student shelter in Stimlje in Kosovo.

She was also: president of the Board of Miss "Serbian Sisters' Circle", secretary and vice president of the section of the "Yugoslav Women's Union" for Belgrade, vice president of the Board of "Girls for Education and Protection of Children", member of the Board of Education, then "Secondary school mothers of warrior orphans","Yugoslav Matica","Mother's Association","League of Women for Peace and Freedom","Unity of All-Slavic Women", secretary and board member of the House of Students, board member of the Sokol Association MATICA Belgrade, Association "Housewife and Mother", Women's Movement, Society for the Protection of Animals Cvijeta Zuzorić, member of the French Club, member of the Polish and Czechoslovak League.

The Historical Archive of Belgrade holds a collection of photographs taken by Milojković at various social events.

=== Recognition ===
Milojković received the Order of St. Sava and the honorary diploma of the Association of Offices of the Corps of the Russian Imperial Army and Navy in the Kingdom of Yugoslavia.
