= Big Brother Family =

- Presented by: Niki Kanchev
- No. of days: 81
- No. of housemates: 15 families (30 housemates)
- Winners: Kuzmovi family (Eli Plamenova Vladkova & Veselin Ivanov Kuzmov)
- Runners-up: Kolevi family (Sofia Dimitrova Koleva & Tsoncho Stoyanov Kolev)

Release
- Original network: Nova Television
- Original release: 22 March – 10 June 2010

Big Brother Family was the first family edition of the reality show Big Brother in Bulgaria, it was initially referred to as Big Brother 5. It was also the first family season all over the world. The show launched on Nova Television on 22 March 2010 and continued for 3 months (12 weeks), ended on 10 June. This was the shortest regular Big Brother season in Bulgaria so far, lasted for 81 Days.

Big Brother Family was produced by Niko Tuparev (Old School Productions). For the very first time the Housemates consisted of families - married couples or ones with a child. The winning family was Kouzmovi, who won 200,000 leva, an apartment and a car. Also, for the first time the Housemates had salary. This was the first regular season to be held in the spring, instead of a VIP-season.

== Pre-series ==
A new season of Big Brother was confirmed by Niki Kanchev on the "Man of the year 2009" awards. The first promo for Big Brother Family was aired on Nova Television on 24 December 2009. It featured the actor Nikolay Urumov.

== Broadcast ==
The show was aired on Nova Television. Live shows (nominations and evictions) aired on Mondays and Thursdays at 8:00 PM. Daily shows were aired on Tuesdays, Wednesdays and Fridays at 9:00 PM. Diema Family was broadcasting live every day at 9:30 AM.

== Housemates ==
From 16 January until 7 February auditions were held in the four biggest cities in Bulgaria - Bourgas, Plovdiv, Varna and Sofia. Bulgarian families who live abroad also auditioned after completing a survey on the official website of Big Brother Family. Ani Vladimirova is again the show's psychologist.

10 families entered the House on Day 1. Another 5 new families entered the show on Day 32, which made Big Brother Family the season with the most contestants so far in Bulgaria - 30.

Family	Name	Age on entry	Occupation	Hometown	Relatives (in the house)	Day entered	Day exited	Status
Kuzmovi	Veselin Ivanov Kuzmov	32	Funeral agent	Plovdiv	Christian - son (6 years old); Elia - daughter (2.5 years old)	1	81	Winner
Kuzmovi	Eli Plamenova Vladkova	34	Unemployed	Plovdiv	Christian - son (6 years old); Elia - daughter (2.5 years old)	1	81	Winner
Kolevi	Sofia Dimitrova Koleva	59	Store manager	Stara Zagora		32	81	Runner-up
Kolevi	Tsoncho Stoyanov Kolev	59	Coach	Straldzha		32	81	Runner-up
Chipevi	Sashka Stamenova Chipeva	30	Waitress	Etropole		1	81	Third Place
Chipevi	Pavlin Ivanov Chipev	32	Unemployed	Sofia		1	81	Third Place
Stefanovi	Diana Dimitrova Stefanova	28	Stewardess and yoga instructor	Burgas	Karina - daughter (1 years old)	32	81	Fourth Place
Stefanovi	Dobrin Stefanov Stefanov	30	Lawyer	Varna	Karina - daughter (1 years old)	32	81	Fourth Place
Trifonovi	Hristo Dimitrov Trifonov	38	Businessman	Pomorie		1	78	Evicted
Trifonovi	Kornelia Hristova Bairaktarova	34	Businesswoman	Stara Zagora		1	78	Evicted
Genchevi	Antoni Mitkov Genchev	40	Construction businessman	Varna		32	71	Evicted
Genchevi	Tsanka Slavova Stoyanova	39	Housewife	Varna		32	71	Evicted
Kachanovi	David Tsankov Kachanov	26	Cook	Velingrad		1	64	Evicted
Kachanovi	Eleonora Teodorova Palaveyska	19	Waiter	Plovdiv		1	64	Evicted
Ivanovi	Plamen Ivanov Petrov	34	Musician	Montana		32	57	Evicted
Ivanovi	Borislava Svetlozarova Petrova	32	Unemployed	Sofia		32	57	Evicted
Gospodinovi	Magdalena Yankova Mihailova - Gospodinova	24	Hairdressing salon owner	Targovishte		32	50	Evicted
Gospodinovi	Dinko Marchev Gospodinov	26	Businessman	Burgas		32	50	Evicted
Petrovi	Angelika Petrova	29	Model	Belarus		1	43	Evicted
Petrovi	Radoslav Petrov	29	Manager	Sofia		1	43	Evicted
Kamenarovi	Radka Bozhkova Kamenarova	62	Physician	Plovdiv		1	32	Evicted
Kamenarovi	Chavdar Nikolov Kamenarov	63	Engineer	Plovdiv		1	32	Evicted
Tsvetanovi	Tsvetelin Hristov Tsvetanov	31	Salesman	Sofia		1	25	Evicted
Tsvetanovi	Vanessa Tihomirova Saykova	17	Student	Botevgrad		1	25	Evicted
Shopovi	Maria Petrova Shopova	26	Unemployed	Ruse		1	25	Evicted
Shopovi	Stoyan Emilov Shopov	24	DJ	Ruse		1	25	Evicted
Milevi	Boryana Ilcheva Mileva	37	Unemployed	Sofia	Martin - son (7 years old); Kalina - daughter (4 years old)	1	18	Evicted
Milevi	Boyan Milev Milev	37	Restaurateur and businessman	Primorsko	Martin - son (7 years old); Kalina - daughter (4 years old)	1	18	Evicted
Leomani	Massimo Leomanni	39	Businessman	Lecce, Italy	Vivien - daughter (4 years old)	1	5	Walked
Leomani	Kristiana Raicheva Andreeva - Leomanni	32	Former model	Varna	Vivien - daughter (4 years old)	1	5	Walked

=== Chipevi ===
Sashka is from Etropole and Pavlin is from Sofia. They entered the House and Day 1 and were supposed to help the two fake families with their secret task. They finished third in the finale on Day 81.

=== Genchevi ===
Tsanka and Antony are from Varna. They entered the House on Day 32 and were the ninth evicted on Day 71. Antony is a brother of Ivayla and Bozhidara from VIP Brother 3.

=== Gospodinovi ===
Dinko is from Burgas and Magdalena is from Turgovishte. They entered the House on Day 32 and were the sixth evicted on Day 50.

=== Ivanovi ===
Borislava is from Sofia and Plamen is from Montana. They entered the House on Day 32 with a secret mission. Plamen has to seduce Kornelia and Borislava has to seduce Radoslav. They were the seventh evicted on Day 57. Plamen is a keyboard player in the famous orchestra Kristali.

=== Kachanovi ===
Eleonora is from Plovdiv and David is from Velingrad. They entered the House on Day 1 and were the eighth evicted on Day 64.

=== Kamenarovi ===
Radka and Chavdar are from Plovdiv. They are the oldest couple in the House (62 years old respectively), and also the oldest Housemates in the history of Big Brother Bulgaria. They entered the House on Day 1 and were the fourth evicted on Day 32.

=== Kolevi ===
Tsoncho is from Straldja and Sofia is from Stara Zagora. They entered the House on Day 32 and finished second in the finale on Day 81. They lived in the United States for 18 years before entering the House. Sofia worked with a close partner of Donald Trump.

=== Kuzmovi ===
Eli is from Plovdiv and Veselin is from Dimitrovgrad. They entered the House on Day 1 with their two children and two dogs and became a winners on Day 81.

=== Leomani ===
Massimo is from Lecce, Italy and Kristiana is from Varna. They entered the House with their daughter on Day 1 and walked on Day 5. Together with Danail and Daniel from Big Brother 4, they are holding the record for the shortest stay in the House in Big Brother Bulgaria - 4 Days.

=== Milevi ===
Boryana is from Sofia and Boyan is from Primorsko. They entered the House on Day 1 with their two children and were the first evicted on Day 18.

=== Petrovi ===
Andzhelika was born in Belarus and Radoslav is from Sofia. They entered the House on Day 1 and were the fifth evicted on Day 43.

=== Shopovi ===
Maria and Stoyan are both from Ruse. They entered the House on Day 1 and were the second evicted on Day 25.

=== Stefanovi ===
Dobrin is from Varna and Diyana is from Burgas. They entered the House on Day 32 with their one-year daughter Karina and finished fourth in the finale on Day 81. Dobrin was a candidate for Big Brother 2 and Big Brother 3.

=== Trifonovi ===
Kornelia is from Stara Zagora and Hristo is from Pomorie. Sixteen years later, their daughter Desislava participated in another format of NOVA Hell's Kitchen. They entered the House on Day 1 and were the tenth evicted on Day 78.

=== Tsvetanovi ===
Vanesa is from Botevgrad and Tsvetelin is from Sofia. Vanessa is 17 years old, making her the youngest Housemate in the history of Big Brother Bulgaria. They entered the House on Day 1 with a secret task. Tsvetelin entered with Iva, the mother of his first child, pretending that they were married. Vanessa entered with her ex-boyfriend Svetlin. They were also pretending to be a family and entered the House via the secret room, where they stayed for one week. On Day 8 they entered the main House. The four Housemates had to keep their secret task for 10 Days. However, it was unsuccessful.

Iva and Svetlin left the House on Day 15. Tsvetanovi were the third evicted on Day 25.

== House ==
Big Brother Family was shot in the House in Novi khan, where the Housemates from Big Brother 4 and VIP Brother 3 lived. It was redecorated for the new season.

For the new family format there was a supermarket, restaurant, beauty salon and ATM. As there were families with children, private teachers were teaching them during their stay in the House.

== Nominations table ==
Each Monday every family nominates two Housemate with two and one points. The first name listed is the one nominated with two points, and the second - with one. The three families with the most negative votes are nominated for eviction on Thursday.

	Week 3	Week 4	Week 5	Week 6	Week 7	Week 8	Week 9	Week 10	Week 11	Final		Nominations received
Kuzmovi	Boryana, Vanesa	Radka, Vanesa	Radka, Eleonora	Borislava, Antony	Diyana, Dobrin	Ivanovi, Trifonovi (Eli only)	Dorbin, Diyana	Nominated	Kolevi, Stefanovi	Winner (Day 81)		8
Kolevi	Not in House			David, Andzhelika	David, Eleonora	Kachanovi, Chipevi (Sofia only)	Eleonora, Veselin	No; Nominations	Stefanovi, Chipevi	Runner-up (Day 81)		14
Cipevi	Tsvetelin, Radka	Chavdar, Radka	David, Eleonora	Sofia, Tsoncho	Antony, Tsanka	Ivanovi, Genchevi (Sashka only)	Tsoncho, Tsanka	No; Nominations	Trifonovi, Stefanovi	Third place (Day 81)		5
Stefanovi	Not in House			Andzhelika, Radoslav	Veselin, David	Kachanovi, Kuzmovi (Diyana only)	Tsanka, David	No; Nominations	Trifonovi, Chipevi	Fourth place (Day 81)		5
Trifonovi	Tsvetelin, Radka	Radka, Tsvetelin	Radka, Chavdar	Borislava, Plamen	Antony, Tsanka	Ivanovi, Kachanovi (Kornelia only)	Tsanka, Tsoncho	Nominated	Chipevi, Stefanovi	Evicted (Day 78)		17
Genchevi	Not in House			Veselin, Hristo	David, Veselin	Kachanovi, Trifonovi (Tsanka only)	Hristo, Eleonora	Nominated	Evicted (Day 71)			16
Kachanovi	Tsvetelin, Maria	In Secret; Suite	Andzhelika, Radoslav	Tsoncho, Tsanka	Dinko, Magdalena	Kolevi, Genchevi (Eleonora only)	Tsoncho, Sofia	Evicted (Day 64)				33
Ivanovi	Not in House			Andzhelika, Radoslav	Eleonora, Hristo	Kachanovi, Trifonovi (Borislava only)	Evicted (Day 57)					11
Gospodinovi	Not in House			Hristo, Kornelia	David, Eleonora	Evicted (Day 50)						3
Petrovi	Boryana, Tsvetelin	Tsvetelin, Radka	David, Eleonora	Hristo, Kornelia	Evicted (Day 43)							12
Kamenarovi	Tsvetelin, Boyan	Tsvetelin, Stoyan	Andzhelika, Veselin	Evicted (Day 32)								16
Tsvetanovi	Pavlin, Sashka	Maria, Stoyan	Evicted (Day 25)									20
Shopovi	Tsvetelin, David	Tsvetelin, Radka	Evicted (Day 25)									5
Milevi	Hristo, Kornelia	Evicted (Day 18)										5
Leomani	Walked (Day 5)											0
Nomination notes	1	2	3	4, 5	6	7	8, 9	10	11, 12	none		
Against public vote	Chipevi, ~~Tsvetanovi~~, Milevi, ~~Trifonovi~~	Tsvetanovi, Kamenarovi, Shopovi	~~Kachanovi~~, Kamenarovi, Petrovi	Ivanovi, Petrovi, ~~Trifonovi~~	~~Genchevi~~, Gospodinovi, Kachanovi, ~~Kuzomvi~~, ~~Stefanovi~~	Ivanovi, ~~Kachanovi~~, Trifonovi	Genchevi, ~~Kolevi~~, Kachanovi	Genchevi, ~~Kuzomvi~~, Trifonovi	Chipevi, ~~Kolevi~~, ~~Kuzomvi~~, Trifonovi	All; Families		
Walked	Leomani	none										
Evicted	Milevi; 67.2% to evict	Shopovi; 69.1% to evict	Kamenarovi; 40.4% to save	Petrovi; 48.7% to save	Gospodinovi; 57.4% to evict	Ivanovi; 55.5% to evict	Kachanovi; 58.3% to evict	Genchevi; 51.4% to evict	Trifonovi; 64.3% to evict	Stefanovi; 11.5% (out of 4)	Chipevi; 21.9% (out of 3)	
Evicted	Milevi; 67.2% to evict	Tsvetanovi; 22.8% to evict	Kamenarovi; 40.4% to save	Petrovi; 48.7% to save	Gospodinovi; 57.4% to evict	Ivanovi; 55.5% to evict	Kachanovi; 58.3% to evict	Genchevi; 51.4% to evict	Trifonovi; 64.3% to evict	Kolevi; 32% (out of 2)	Kuzmovi; 68% to win	

=== Notes ===
- ^Note 1 : Following the first round of nominations, the public was asked to vote for their two favorite families out of the four nominated. The two who received the most votes were then saved from eviction.
- ^Note 2 : Following the argument between David and Eleonora, Big Brother decided to send them to a secret suite for a 'Honey Moon', so they could work on their relationship. As they were still in the suite at the time of nominations, they were both immune in the second round of nominations.
- ^Note 3 : Following the third round of nominations, the public was asked to vote for their favorite family out of the three nominated. The family who received the most votes was then saved from eviction.
- ^Note 4 : On Day 36 Big Brother divided the Housemates into two teams - old Housemates and Intruders. After three special tasks, the old Housemates won the game and had to divide 3 nomination points between the Intruders. They chose to nominate Antony, Dinko and Plamen with one point each.
- ^Note 5 : Following the fourth round of nominations, the public was asked to vote for their favorite family out of the three nominated. The family who received the most votes was then saved from eviction.
- ^Note 6 : Following the fifth round of nominations, the public was asked to vote for their three favorite families out of the five nominated. The families who received the most votes were then saved from eviction.
- ^Note 7 : During the sixth round of nominations, only the female Housemates were allowed to nominate. They nominated with two points one of the other families (not just a single Housemate), and another one with one point. One of the nominated families was then saved by the public with a positive vote.
- ^Note 8 : In honor of Mothers Day, for the seventh round of nominations the mothers of one member of each couple nominated.
- ^Note 9 : Following the seventh round of nominations, the public was asked to vote for their favorite family out of the three nominated. The family who received the most votes was then saved from eviction.
- ^Note 10 : Following the eighth round of nominations, the public was asked to vote for their favorite family out of the three nominated. The family who received the most votes was then saved from eviction.
- ^Note 11 : For the final round of nominations, each couple awarded points to the two couples they wanted to see in the final.
- ^Note 12 : Following the final round of nominations, the public was asked to vote for their favorite families out of the four nominated. The two families who received the most votes were then saved from eviction.
