= Big Brother (Bulgarian TV series) =

- Genre: Reality competition
- Based on: Big Brother by John de Mol Jr.
- Presented by: Bashar Rahal; Aleksandra Bogdanska; Elena Sergova; Niki Kanchev; Aleksandra Sarchadjieva; Azis; Miglena Angelova; Kamelia; Milen Tsvetkov; Veneta Raykova; Dim Dukov; Evelina Pavlova
- Country of origin: Bulgaria
- Original language: Bulgarian
- No. of seasons: 7

Original release
- Network: Nova Television
- Release: 18 October 2004

Related
- VIP Brother; Big Brother Family; Big Brother All-Stars

Big Brother is a reality show based on the Big Brother series by Endemol. The show originates from the Netherlands, where in 1999 the first season was aired.

At present, the format is spread in a number of countries around the world. A group of people (called the Housemates) live together in an isolated house. 24 hours a day their life is recorded by hidden cameras in all the rooms in the House. They do not have TV, Internet, newspapers, even watches on their wrists. The Housemates are completely isolated from the outside world. Every week, each one of them must enter the Diary room and nominate two of the other people for public eviction. The two or more housemates with most negative votes become nominated. For almost a week the TV viewers have to decide which of them to be evicted, voting via SMS or phone calls. Every week the Housemates have a week task. Depending on whether they perform their task successfully or unsuccessfully, their week budget is increased or decreased. During the final week, the viewers vote which one of the remaining people in the House to be the winner, who receives a large cash prize.

The show's name comes from George Orwell's 1948 novel Nineteen Eighty-Four, a dystopia in which Big Brother is the all-seeing, omnipotent leader of Oceania.

In Bulgaria, the first season of Big Brother was aired in 2004 on Nova Television, and quickly became one of the most successful TV formats in the country. Niki Kanchev was the main presenter in all editions, except for Big Brother 4, where he was replaced by Milen Tsvetkov. Evelina Pavlova was a co-host in the period 2004–2006. Seven main seasons, ten Celebrity seasons, four All-Stars seasons, two Most Wanted seasons, and a Family season have been produced so far. The seventh main season premiered on 21 September 2025.

== Seasons ==
=== Big Brother ===
Season	Launch date	Final date	Hosts		Days	Housemates	Winner
Big Brother 1	18 October 2004	17 January 2005	Niki Kunchev	Evelina Pavlova	92	15	Zdravko Vasilev
Big Brother 2	19 September 2005	19 December 2005	Niki Kunchev	Evelina Pavlova	92	19	† Miroslav Atanasov
Big Brother 3	18 September 2006	11 December 2006	Niki Kunchev		85	18	Lyubov Stancheva
Big Brother 4	22 September 2008	14 December 2008	Milen Tsvetkov	Rumen Lukanov	84	26	Georgi Alurkov
Big Brother 5	17 August 2015	11 September 2015	Niki Kunchev	Aleksandra Sarchadjieva	26	13	Nikita Jönsson
Big Brother 6	8 October 2024	30 November 2024	Aleksandra Bogdanska	Bashar Rahal	54	16	Mario Todorov
Big Brother 7	21 September 2025	15 November 2025	Aleksandra Bogdanska	Bashar Rahal	55	16	David Bett

=== VIP Brother ===
Season	Launch date	Final date	Hosts			Days	Housemates	Winner
VIP Brother 1	13 March 2006	10 April 2006	Niki Kunchev	Evelina Pavlova		29	12	Konstantin Slavchev
VIP Brother 2	26 March 2007	27 April 2007	Niki Kunchev			33	13	Hristina Stefanova
VIP Brother 3	16 March 2009	10 May 2009	Niki Kunchev	Dimitar Rachkov	Maria Ignatova	56	17	Deyan Slavchev - Deo
VIP Brother 4	16 September 2012	17 November 2012	Niki Kunchev	Aleksandra Sarchadjieva		63	16	Orlin Pavlov
VIP Brother 5	15 September 2013	16 November 2013	Niki Kunchev	Aleksandra Sarchadjieva		63	17	Stanka Zlateva
VIP Brother 6	15 September 2014	17 November 2014	Niki Kunchev	Aleksandra Sarchadjieva		64	18	Vladislav Karamfilov - Vladi Vargala
VIP Brother 7	13 September 2015	13 November 2015	Niki Kunchev	Aleksandra Sarchadjieva		62	15	Georgi Tashev - Gino Biancalana
VIP Brother 8	11 September 2016	11 November 2016	Niki Kunchev	Aleksandra Sarchadjieva		62	19	Miglena Angelova
VIP Brother 9	11 September 2017	10 November 2017	Niki Kunchev	Aleksandra Sarchadjieva	Miglena Angelova	61	18	Yonislav Yotov - Toto
VIP Brother 10	10 September 2018	2 November 2018	Niki Kunchev	Aleksandra Sarchadjieva	Azis	54	17	Atanas Kolev

=== Big Brother Family ===
Season	Launch date	Final date	Host	Days	Families	Winner
Big Brother Family	22 March 2010	10 June 2010	Niki Kunchev	81	15	Eli & Veselin Kuzmovi

=== Big Brother All Stars & Most Wanted ===
Season	Launch date	Final date	Hosts			Days	Housemates	Winner
Big Brother All Stars 2012	19 November 2012	17 December 2012	Niki Kunchev	Aleksandra Sarchadjieva		29	11	Nikola Nasteski - Lester
Big Brother All Stars 2013	18 November 2013	16 December 2013	Niki Kunchev	Aleksandra Sarchadjieva		29	12	Zlatka Dimitrova
Big Brother All Stars 2014	19 November 2014	15 December 2014	Niki Kunchev	Aleksandra Sarchadjieva		27	10	† Todor Slavkov
Big Brother All Stars 2015	16 November 2015	14 December 2015	Niki Kunchev	Aleksandra Sarchadjieva		29	8	Desislava
Big Brother: Most Wanted 2017	13 November 2017	11 December 2017	Niki Kunchev	Aleksandra Sarchadjieva		29	12	Georgi Tashev - Gino Biancalana
Big Brother: Most Wanted 2018	5 November 2018	10 December 2018	Niki Kunchev	Aleksandra Sarchadjieva	Azis	36	12	Stefan Ivanov - Wosh MC

== Big Brother: The Housemates Strike Back ==
On 7 June 2007, Big Brother brought former housemates from Big Brother and VIP Brother seasons together and gave them their last task — to destroy the House. Here are the housemates, who participated in the special edition of the show:

From	Housemates
Big Brother 1	Mariela "Mel" Kiselkova; Nayden Kiselkova; Stoyka Stefanova; Tihomir Georgiev (Also participated in VIP Brother 2); Veneta Mileva-Ilieva; Zdravko Vasilev (Winner of Big Brother 1 and also participated in VIP Brother 2); Zeyneb Madzhurova
Big Brother 2	Elena Georgieva; Ivan Hristov Naydenov; Leonardo "Leo" Bianchi; Miroslav Atanasov (Winner of Big Brother 2); Nedyalko Petkov Lazarov; Silvia Dragoeva; Stefan Angelov Kemalov "Bat Sali"; Zvezdelin Kochev Minchev "Vego"
Big Brother 2	Stefan and Leonardo made a performance as a part of the concert in the House by some of the singer stars from VIP Brother.
VIP Brother 1	Damaskin "Dim" Stoyanov Dukov; Dimitar Vasilev Marinov "Mityo Pishtova"; Konstantin Ivanov Slavov (Winner of VIP Brother 1); Rayna Terziyska
VIP Brother 1	Rayna and Konstantin also made a performance. Damaskin also sang with Konstantin.
Big Brother 3	Borislav Nikolov Borisov; Eva Ivanova Miteva; Garo Edi Papazyan; Lilyana Yurieva Angelova; Panayot Aleksandrov Kyuchukov "Patso"; Penyo Todorov Daskalov; Svetlana Nikolaeva Stoycheva; The Triplets: Vyara, Nadezhda and Lyubov Ilieva Stancheva (Winners of Big Brother 3); Violeta Tsvetanova Kondova "Vili"
Big Brother 3	Penyo participated in the concert.
VIP Brother 2	Desislava; Hristina Stefnova (Winner of VIP Brother 2. Zdravko's wife.); Kalin Lubenov Velyov; Magdalena "Magi" Zhelyazkova; Petya Pavlova; Tihomir Georgiev; Zdravko Vasilev
VIP Brother 2	Desislava and Petya participated in the concert. Kalin sang with his friend Nina Nikolina.

== Trivia ==
- General
  - Winners: 15 males, 7 females and 1 family
  - Youngest Big Brother winner: David Bett (Big Brother 7) – 20
  - Big Brother winner with the highest percentage: 78%, Konstantin, VIP Brother 1
  - Highest eviction percentage: Elena Georgieva, 86%, Big Brother 2
  - Least eviction difference: Lilana, 4%, VIP Brother 1
  - Oldest Big Brother housemate: Radka and Chavdar Kamenarovi – 62 years old, Big Brother Family
  - Season with most contestants: Big Brother 4, 26 housemates
  - Season with fewest contestants: Big Brother All Stars 4, 8 housemates
  - Shortest gap between 2 Big Brother seasons: 2 days, BB5 – VIP Brother 7
  - Shortest Big Brother: Big Brother 5 – 26 days
  - Longest Big Brother: Big Brother 1 and Big Brother 2 – 92 days
  - Shortest stay in the House: Danail Panchev and Daniel Delchev, Big Brother 4, 4 days
  - Big Brother with highest money-prize: Big Brother 4, 300 000 leva
  - Most housemates to leave the house voluntarily: 4, VIP Brother 1
  - Most housemates left on the final night: 7, VIP Brother 3
  - Youngest Big Brother housemate: Vanesa Tsvetanova (Big Brother Family) – 17 years old
  - VIP Brother with highest money-prize: VIP Brother 2, 100 000 leva (in the first season it was 50 000)
  - Longest time spent in the House: 118 days, Zdravko Vasilev – Big Brother 1 and VIP Brother 2
  - Most nominated housemate during a season: 38 nominations, Luna – VIP Brother 7
  - Contestant won twice: Georgi Tashev "Gino Biancalana" – VIP Brother 7 and Big Brother Most Wanted 1
- 2004–2005 /Big Brother 1/
  - First set of nominees: Anelia and Dimitar
  - First contestant to be evicted: Anelia Ivanova
  - First contestant to voluntarily leave: Dimitar Kazalov
  - First replacement housemate: Tihomir Georgiev
  - First Big Brother Winner: Zdravko Vassilev /200 000 leva/
  - First contestants to be expelled by Big Brother: Nayden Naydenov and Svetlan Shevrov “Groshi”
  - First sex in the House: Tihomir Georgiev and Mariela Kiselkova
  - First lesbian sex: Mariela Kiselkova and Svetlozara Trendafilova
  - Longest time spent in the house without being nominated: 70 days, Svetlozara Trendafilova
  - First housemate not to be nominated during the whole season: Viktor
- 2005 /Big Brother 2/
  - First "evil" Big Brother
  - First Big Brother with a couple competing: Elena and Miroslav
  - First contestant to be voted into the house by the public: Elena Romele
  - First foreigner housemate: Leonardo Bianchi (from Italy)
  - Longest time spent in the house by a replacement housemate: Elena Romele
- 2006 /VIP Brother 1/
  - First set of nominees: Rayna, Mityo Pishtova and Vesela Neynska
  - First VIP housemate to be evicted: Raina
  - First VIP housemate to voluntarily leave: Vesela Neynska
  - First VIP Brother Winner: Konstantin /50 000 levas/
  - First child to enter and live in the House: Danaya (3 years old)
  - First blood related housemates: Violeta and Danaya, mother and daughter
  - Fewest housemates to be evicted: 2
  - First Big Brother with secret inquisition: VIP Brother 1
- 2006 /Big Brother 3/
  - First season with a talk show: Big Brother's Big Mouth
  - First triplets competing: Vyara, Nadezhda and Lyubov
  - First pregnant housemate: Svetlana
  - First Big Brother baby: Amber
  - First faked eviction: Panayot and Mariola
  - Longest time before the first eviction takes place: 29 days
  - First nominations with 5 nominated housemates (Vyara, Nadezhda, Lilyana, Svetlana, Penyo): the sixth nominations
  - First double eviction: Penyo and Nadezhda
  - First non-secret nominations: the eighth nominations
  - First nominations with positive votes: the ninth nominations
  - First final with two people in fourth place: Lilyana and Paloma (they had equal votes)
  - First woman to win: Lyubov
- 2007 /VIP Brother 2/
  - First housemates to compete in two Big Brother seasons: Zdravko and Tihomir, previously from Big Brother 1
  - First TV show shot in the House during Big Brother: Hot with host Veneta Raykova (one of the Housemates)
  - First family in the House: Zdravko, Hristina and Yanitsa
  - First wedding in the House: Zdravko and Hristina
  - First non-VIP on VIP Brother: Hristina
  - First nominations when the Housemates can nominate themselves positively: the first nominations
  - First nominations when the Housemates had to nominate three people: the second nominations
  - First non-VIP to win VIP Brother: Hristina
  - First intruder to win: Hristina
- 2008 /Big Brother 4/
  - First season to be shot in the new House
  - First season without Niki Kanchev as a host
- 2009 /VIP Brother 3/
  - The longest VIP season of the show in Bulgaria – 56 Days.
