= Nova (disambiguation) =

A nova is an exploding star.

Nova or NOVA may also refer to:

== Arts, entertainment and media ==
=== Fictional entities ===
- Nova (fairy), in the American TV series Once Upon a Time
- Nova (Planet of the Apes), a character in Planet of the Apes
- Nova (StarCraft), a character in the StarCraft series and Heroes of the Storm
- Nova (Frankie Raye), a Marvel Comics superhero and a Herald of Galactus
- Nova (Richard Rider), a Marvel Comics superhero, the original Nova and leader of the Nova Corps
- Nova (Sam Alexander), a Marvel Comics superhero, the teenage member of the Nova Corps
- Nova Bright, a character from the movie Zombies 4: Dawn of the Vampires
- Nova Forrester, a character in Star Blazers
- Nova (Ultra monster)
- Nova 6, a biochemical weapon in Call of Duty: Black Ops
- NOVA, in Kirby Super Star
- Nova, a Magic Knight Rayearth character
- Nova, a Super Robot Monkey Team Hyperforce Go! character
- Nova Terron, a supporting character in Mysticons
- NOVA Laboratories, fictional company that developed the S.A.I.N.T. robots in Short Circuit (1986 film)
- Mira Nova, a character in Buzz Lightyear of Star Command

=== Gaming ===
- N.O.V.A. Near Orbit Vanguard Alliance, a 2009 video game

=== Literature ===
- Nova (novel), by Samuel R. Delany
- Nova 1 through Nova 4, anthologies of original science fiction edited by Harry Harrison
- Nova Awards, UK science fiction award
- The Nova Trilogy, a series of novels by William S. Burroughs
- Nova (Brazilian magazine), a monthly women's magazine
- Nova (UK magazine), a British magazine (1965–75)
- Nova Science Fiction, a Swedish magazine for science fiction
- Nova (tabloid), a weekly Indonesian tabloid

=== Music ===
==== Artists ====
- Nova (Bangladeshi band), a psychedelic, progressive and hard rock band, formed in 1986
- Nova (Dutch band), an electronic music band featuring Rob Papen, also known as Peru
- Nova (Italian band), a progressive rock/jazz fusion band, formed in 1975
- Nova (Swedish band), a pop music band that participated in the Eurovision Song Contest 1973

==== Albums and songs ====
- Nova (Atargatis album), 2007
- Nova (RL Grime album), 2018
- "Nova" (The Sound of Arrows song), by The Sound of Arrows

=== Film ===
- Nova (film), a 2023 Israeli documentary

=== Radio ===
- Deutschlandfunk Nova, a German radio station
- Nova (radio network), a group of Australian radio stations
- Nova M Radio, an American radio network
- Radio Nova (disambiguation), the name of several radio stations

=== Television ===
- Nova TV (disambiguation), the name of several television channels
- Nova (Dutch TV program), a current-events program
- Nova (American TV program), a science documentary series

== Businesses and organizations ==
=== Companies ===
- Nova (Greece), a media and telecommunications company
- Nova (Iceland), a telecommunications company
- Nova Bus, a Canadian bus manufacturer
- Nova Measuring Instruments, a provider of semiconductor manufacturing equipment
- Nova Chemicals, a Canadian petrochemical company
- Nova Energy, a division of Todd Corporation
- Nova Entertainment, an Australian company
- Nova Performance Paragliders, an Austrian aircraft manufacturer
- Nova Press, a French media company
- Nova Studios, gay pornographic film studio
- Nova Systems, who run the Nova Systems Space Precinct in Peterborough, South Australia
- Elavon Inc., formerly NOVA, a processor of card transactions and a subsidiary of U.S. Bancorp

=== Political parties ===
- New Majority (Slovakia)
- New Serb Democracy, Montenegro
- New Party (Serbia)
- Nova–New Future, a Spanish party associated with Sobiranistes

=== Schools ===
- Northern Virginia Community College, Virginia, U.S., also known as NoVa
- Nova High School (Redding, California), U.S., a public high school from 1967 to 1991
- Nova High School, Florida, U.S.
- Nova Southeastern University, Florida, U.S.
- The Nova Project, an alternative high school in Washington, U.S.
- Nova (eikaiwa), an English language conversation school in Japan
- NOVA University Lisbon, Portugal
- Villanova University, Pennsylvania, U.S., informally known as Nova
  - Villanova Wildcats, the school's athletic program also known by the informal nickname

=== Other organisations ===
- Nova – Center for Social Innovation, Spain
- Nova Group (metros), multinational collection of metro systems focusing on international benchmarking, based in London, UK
- NOVA-MBA Association, the global association of Italian MBAs
- Nova Institution for Women, a Canadian federal women's prison
- National Organization for Victim Advocacy, American victims' rights group

== Computing ==
- Data General Nova, a minicomputer first built in 1969
- NOVA (filesystem), a Linux filesystem
- Nova (operating system), a Cuban state-sponsored Linux distribution
- OpenStack Nova, a distributed computing component
- Nova, a web development application made by Panic Inc.
- Nova Launcher, an Android launcher
- Huawei Nova, smartphone model by Huawei

== People ==
=== Given name and mononym ===
- Nova (given name), including a list of people with the name
- Nova (singer), a Puerto Rican reggaeton and hip hop singer, part of duo Nova & Jory
- Nova (wrestler), ring name of American pro wrestler Mike Bucci
- Nova (activist), twentieth-century gay liberation activist
- Shaheeda Sinckler, winner of the 2020 Scottish Album of the Year Award, known by the stage name "Nova"

=== Surname ===
- Aldo Nova (born 1956), Canadian musician
- Debi Nova, stage name of Costa Rican singer-songwriter Deborah Nowalski Kader (born 1980)
- Erika Nõva (1905–1987), Estonian architect
- Heather Nova (born 1967), Bermudan singer, songwriter and poet
- Iván Nova (born 1987), Dominican baseball player
- Stella Nova (1960–2010), British guitarist

== Places ==
- Nova, Hungary
- Nova, East Azerbaijan, Iran
- Nova, Semnan, Iran
- Nova, Cherepovetsky District, Vologda Oblast, Russia
- Nova, Ohio, U.S.
- Northern Virginia, U.S.
- Nova, Africa, former Ancient city and Roman bishopric, now in Tunisia and a Latin Catholic titular see
- Nõva (disambiguation), several places in Estonia
- Nova Mine, in Western Australia

== Science ==
- Nova, a sudden appearance of a bright, apparently "new" star
- Nova classification, a taxonomy of foodstuffs
- Nova (laser), built at the Lawrence Livermore National Laboratory in 1984
- NOvA, a particle physics neutrino experiment in Fermilab

== Transportation and vehicles ==
=== Automotive ===
==== Cars ====
- Nova (kit car), a kit car developed by Automotive Design and Development
- Dacia Nova, a Romanian supermini liftback
- Lada Nova, a Russian compact car sold in Germany
- Various automobiles marketed by General Motors:
  - Chevrolet Nova, an American passenger car
  - Holden Nova, an Australian compact car based on the Toyota Corolla
  - Vauxhall Nova, a British supermini

==== Other uses in automotive ====
- Nova Bus, a Canadian bus manufacturer

=== Spaceflight ===
- Intuitive Machines Nova-series of lunar landers; see Intuitive Machines Nova-C
- Stoke Space Nova, a fully reusable medium-lift launch vehicle by Stoke Space
- Nova (NASA rocket), a series of proposed NASA rocket designs in the 1960s

=== Aviation ===
- Air Nova, a Canadian airline
- Nova Air, an airline based in Mexico City, Mexico
- Nova Airways, a passenger airline based in Khartoum, Sudan
- Nova Airlines AB, operating as Novair, a former Swedish airline
- Nova, a high-altitude ballooning project by CU Spaceflight

=== Other uses in transportation ===
- SS Nova, a Cypriot cargo ship
- Nova, a brand of train cars used by TransPennine Express

== Other uses ==
- Benelli Nova, a pump-action shotgun
- Huawei Nova, smartphone model by Huawei
- Nova, a person lookup tool created by Flock Safety
- Nova music festival massacre
- Nova Scotia salmon or Nova lox, a variant of lox

== See also ==
- Novum (plural Nova), scientifically plausible innovations used by science fiction narratives
- Novak, a surname and a given name
- Novae (disambiguation)
- Novas (disambiguation)
- Nõva (disambiguation)
- Nove (disambiguation)
- Novi (disambiguation)
- Novo (disambiguation)
- Novus (disambiguation)
- Novy (disambiguation)
