= Novo =

Novo may refer to:

== Businesses and organizations ==
- Novo (company) (formerly Novo Nordisk), a Danish multinational pharmaceutical company
- Novo Cinemas, a Middle East chain of movie theatres
- Novo Holdings, the holding company for Novo (formerly Novo Nordisk) and Novonesis (formerly Novozymes)
- Novo Industriel Corporation, the owner of Delta Electric Company in Marion, Indiana, U.S.
- Novo Nordisk Foundation, a Danish enterprise foundation
- NOVO Shoes, a retailer in New Zealand
- New Party (Brazil), a political party
- The Novo, an indoor club in downtown Los Angeles, California, U.S.

== Other uses ==
- Novo (car), a 1922 Czech automobile prototype
- Novo (film), 2002 film by Jean-Pierre Limosin
- "Novo" (song), by Laura Pausini, 2018
- Novo (surname), including a list of people with the name
- Novo Futebol Clube, a Brazilian football club
- Novo Nordisk Foundation Lecture Prize, an annual scientific award
- Novo Nordisk Prize, an annual scientific award
- Novo River (disambiguation), several rivers
- Novo, Russia, several rural localities in Russia
- "Novo", a song by Millencolin from the 2005 album Kingwood
- Novo, 1970s–1980s Soviet reissue of some Frog model kits
- Short for Novolazarevskaya Station

== See also ==
- De novo (disambiguation), a Latin expression meaning 'from the beginning'
- Ex novo, a Latin expression meaning "from new"
- Nova (disambiguation)
- Nove (disambiguation)
- Novi (disambiguation)
- Novus (disambiguation)
- Novy (disambiguation)
- Porto Novo (disambiguation)
