= Novy =

Novy or Novaya or Novoye may refer to:

Novy (surname), Slavic surname literally meaning "new"

== Places ==
- Novy (inhabited locality), Novaya, Novoye, the name of several places in Russia
- Novy Port, on the Ob River, Russia
- Novaya (river), a tributary of the Khatanga in Russia
- Novoye, Kaliningrad Oblast, abandoned village in Russia

== Other uses ==
- Novy, nickname of Marcin Nowak (musician) (born 1975)
- Novy, a homeware and appliances store, later Otto Simon

== See also ==
- Nova (disambiguation)
- Nove (disambiguation)
- Novi (disambiguation)
- Novo (disambiguation)
- Novus (disambiguation)
