= Novas (disambiguation) =

Novas are cataclysmic nuclear explosions in white dwarf stars.

Novas or NOVAS may also refer to:

- Novas (surname)
- Naval Observatory Vector Astrometry Subroutines, an astronomy software library
- Novas Software, a defunct American circuit design company
- The Novas, a 1960s Texas garage rock band

== See also ==
- Nova (disambiguation)
- Novae (disambiguation)
