= Novo, Russia =

Novo is the name of several rural localities in Russia:

- Novo, Tver Oblast
- Novo, Vladimir Oblast
- Novo, Sheksninsky District, Vologda Oblast

== See also ==
- Novo (disambiguation)
