= Nova TV =

Nova TV may refer to the following television channels:

- Nova BH, Bosnia and Herzegovina
- Nova (Bulgarian TV channel)
  - Nova Sport (Bulgaria)
- Nova+, Bulgaria (defunct)
- Nova Televisión, Colombia
- Nova TV (Croatia)
- TV Nova Pula (Croatia)
- TV Nova (Czech Republic)
  - Nova Cinema (Czech Republic)
  - Nova Sport (Czech Republic and Slovakia)
- Nova (Greece)
  - Nova Cinema (Greece)
  - Novasports
- Nova TV (Iceland)
- Nova M, Montenegro
- TV Nova (North Macedonia) (defunct)
  - TV Nova (Kumanovo) (defunct)
- Nova TV (Romania)
- Nova (Serbia), Serbia
  - Nova.rs
- Nova (Spanish TV channel)

== See also ==
- Nova (disambiguation) § Television
