= Nova+ =

Bulgarian reality TV channel

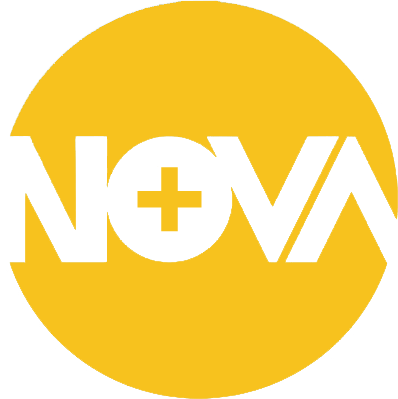
- Proposed logo of Nova+ in 2013
- Country: Bulgaria
- Network: Nova Broadcasting Group
- Headquarters: Sofia, Bulgaria

Programming
- Language: Bulgarian
- Picture format: 16:9 576i (DVB)

Ownership
- Owner: Modern Times Group
- Sister channels: Nova Television; Nova Sport; Kino Nova; Diema; Diema Family; Diema Sport

History
- Launched: 18 October 2004
- Closed: 31 December 2008

Links
- Website: www.novaplus.bg

Nova+ was a Bulgarian reality TV channel. The channel launched with the start of the first season of Big Brother (Bulgaria) in 2004, which was also the first reality show in Bulgaria. During Big Brother 1 the name of the channel was simply Big Brother Live, but its name was changed into Nova+ after the start of the first season of Star Academy Bulgaria on 11 April 2005. The channel aired only during the Big Brother seasons from season 1 to 4.

On 12 May 2008 Nova+ began airing full reality TV programme with popular reality formats. The channel was closed down on 31 December 2008, when Modern Times Group bought the Nova television and Diema groups from ANT1 Group and Balkan Media Group Limited.

== Broadcasting ==
- Big Brother 1 - 18 October 2004 - 17 January 2005
- Star Academy - 11 April 2005 - 18 July 2005
- Big Brother 2 - 19 September 2005 - 19 December 2005
- VIP Brother 1 - 13 March 2006 - 10 April 2006
- Big Brother 3 - 18 September 2006 - 11 December 2006
- VIP Brother 2 - 26 March 2007 - 27 April 2007
- Big Brother 4 - 22 September 2008 - 14 December 2008

== Logos ==
Nova+ logo used until the closedown 2008
