= Nove (disambiguation) =

Nove is a town and commune in Veneto, Italy.

Nove, Noves, Nové, and Novés may also refer to:

== People ==
- Alexander Nove (1915–1994), Russian professor
- Charles Nove (born 1960), BBC voiceover announcer
- Perry Nove, Commissioner of the City of London Police 1998–2002
- Guy Novès (born 1954), former footballer and coach
- Laura de Noves (1310–1348), wife of Count Hugues de Sade and influenced poet Francesco Petrarch

== Places ==
- Nove, Kirovohrad Oblast, Ukraine
- Noves, France
- Novés, Spain

== Other ==
- Nove (TV channel), an Italian TV channel
- Nove Ware, a type of Italian earthenware
- Nove Nakajima, a fictional character in the TV series Magical Girl Lyrical Nanoha

== See also ==
- 9, "novo" in Portuguese
- New (disambiguation), "novo" in Czech, Slovak, and other languages
- Noveschi
- Nova (disambiguation)
- Novi (disambiguation)
- Novo (disambiguation)
- Novus (disambiguation)
