= RNI =

RNI may refer to:

== Radio ==
- Radio Newyork International, a 1980s pirate radio station which broadcast from a ship anchored just off New York city
- Radio Norway International, a former division of the Norwegian Broadcasting Corporation
- Radio Noordzee, 1960s Dutch-language broadcaster from the artificial REM Island
- Radio Noordzee Internationaal or Radio North Sea International, 1970s Dutch-language and English-language broadcaster from the radio ship Mebo II
- Radio Nova (disambiguation), name of numerous radio stations
- Radio Nova International, name of numerous radio stations

== Other uses ==
- A now discontinued alternative of Java Native Interface (a Java programming framework), one offered by Microsoft
- Corn Island Airport (IATA Code: RNI) on Corn Island, Nicaragua
- Rajawali Nasional Indonesia, an Indonesian company
- Rate of natural increase, a demographic measurement
- National Rally of Independents, a political party in Morocco
- "Reference Nutrient Intake", statistical measure of nutrient deficiency in the UK population
- The Office of the Registrar of Newspapers for India
- Rob Navarro Invitational, an annual golf tournament in South Carolina
- "Rolf Nevanlinna Institute" of the University of Helsinki
- Relative Nest Intensity, a measure of how efficiently a CPU and its cache memory are being used, in IBM terminology

== See also ==
- R&I (disambiguation)
