= Big Brother 3 (Bulgarian season) =

- Season 3
- Presented by: Niki Kanchev
- No. of days: 85
- No. of housemates: 18
- Winner: Lyubov Stancheva
- Runner-up: Violeta Kondova

Release
- Original network: Nova Television
- Original release: 18 September – 11 December 2006

Season chronology
- ← Previous; Season 2 Next → Season 4

Big Brother 3 was the third season of the reality show Big Brother in Bulgaria. It was aired on Nova Television and Nova+. The show launched on 18 September 2006 and ended on 11 December 2006. Originally, the season was planned to air for 11 weeks (78 days), 2 weeks shorter than the previous two seasons. However, the season was extended by 7 days and aired for 85 days in total. For the first time, the show was only hosted by Niki Kanchev.

This season, the prize was 500,000 leva. However, the Housemates were being punished with 5,000 leva for each break of the rules (not wearing microphones, discussing the nominations, etc.), the prize dropped to 200,000 leva, the same as in Big Brother 1 and Big Brother 2.

Big Brother 3 also introduced the first Big Brother talk show in Bulgaria - Big Brother's Big Mouth, hosted by former VIP Brother 1 housemate Dim Dukov. It was aired four (initially three) times a week.

This season was also known as "the season of the secrets" - there were many secret tasks during its run.

Big Brother 3 was the first season of the show in Bulgaria, the winner is a female - Lyubov Stancheva, who is one of the Stancheva triplets.

== Housemates ==
18 Housemates entered the House on Day 1.

Name	Age	Occupation	Residence	Day entered	Day exited	Status
Lyubov Ilieva Stancheva	21	Technologist	Blagoevgrad	1	85	Winner
Violeta Tsvetanova Kondova "Vili"	57	Chef	Brusartsi	1	85	Runner-up
Lilyana Yurieva Angelova	25	Businesswoman	Plovdiv	1	85	Third Place
Paloma Okonor Santana	18	Unknown	Pleven	1	85	Fourth Place
Boyan Bogomilov Angelov	23	Bartender	Sofia	1	85	Fifth Place
Todor Kolev Karagiozov	34	Theologian	Sliven	1	80	Evicted
Vyara Ilieva Stancheva	21	Technologist	Blagoevgrad	1	78	Evicted
Pavel Georgiev Takov	24	Security guard	Burgas	1	71	Evicted
Nadezhda Ilieva Stancheva	21	Technologist	Blagoevgrad	1	64	Evicted
Penyo Todorov Daskalov	20	Student	Galabovo	1	64	Evicted
Svetlana Nikolaeva Stoycheva	28	Hairdresser	Popovo	1	57	Evicted
Borislav Nikolov Borisov	25	Athlete	Sofia	1	50	Evicted
Eva Ivanova Miteva	29	Unemployed	Pleven	1	47	Walked
Garo Edi Papazyan	37	Coffee master and hairdresser	Plovdiv	1	43	Evicted
Diyana Anastasova Nikolova "Diya"	21	Space designer	Sofia	1	37	Evicted
Panayot Aleksandrov Kyuchukov "Patso"	23	Student	Galabovo	1	29	Evicted
Mariola Ivanova Indzhova	26	Hairdresser and makeup artist	Sliven	1	16	Walked
Plamen Vrabchev Varbanov	44	Retailer	Varna	1	8	Walked

=== Borislav ===
Borislav Borisov is from Sofia. He entered the house on Day 1 and was the fourth evicted on Day 50. During the show he started romantic relationships with one of the other housemates - Lilyana. They are not together any more.

=== Boyan ===
Boyan Angelov is from Sofia. He entered the house on Day 1 - he was shocked to see his ex-girlfriend Diyana entering the show immediately after him. Boyan remained the last male housemate in the house - he finished fifth in the finale on Day 85.

=== Diyana ===
Diyana Nikolova is from Sofia. She entered the house on Day 1 and was the second evicted on Day 37. She is the ex-girlfriend of Boyan.

=== Eva ===
Eva Miteva is from Pleven. She entered the house on Day 1 and left voluntarily on Day 47. Eva is the ex-girlfriend of Marian from Big Brother 2. They have a daughter - Evana.

=== Garo ===
Garo Papazyan is from Plovdiv. He entered the house on Day 1 and was the third evicted on Day 43. Before entering the house, Garo was given the secret task to help Penyo with his task - pretending to be a woman.

=== Lilyana ===
Lilyana Angelova is from Plovdiv. She entered the house on Day 1 and finished third in the finale on Day 85. In the house, she started relationships with Borislav. However, they are not together any more. It was announced that Hugh Hefner personally asked her photos from the Bulgarian edition of Playboy to be published in the American one.

=== Lyubov ===
Lyubov Stancheva is from Blagoevgrad. She entered the house on Day 1 with her sisters. She is one of the triplets. She became a winner on Day 85.

=== Mariola ===
Mariola Indzhova is from Sliven. She entered the house on Day 1 and walked on Day 16. On the first nominations Big Brother announced that the two housemates with most negative votes will be automatically evicted. These two were Mariola and Panayot. In the studio, they were told that it was a fake eviction and the two were given a secret task - to stay in the two secret rooms in the house for a week. They had to steal clothes and food from their housemates without their notice. Initially, both Mariola and Panayot agreed to return in the secret rooms, but later the same evening Mariola decided to leave voluntarily.

=== Nadezhda ===
Nadezhda Stancheva is from Blagoevgrad. She entered the house on Day 1 with her sisters. She was the first one of the triplets to leave the house - she was the seventh evicted on Day 64.

=== Paloma ===
Paloma Santana is from Pleven. She entered the house on Day 1 and finished fourth in the finale on Day 85. Paloma and Radomira from Big Brother 2 are the youngest housemates in the history of Big Brother Bulgaria. During their stay in the house, they were both 18 years old.

=== Panayot ===
Panayot Kyuchukov "Patso" is from Galabovo. He entered the house on Day 1 and was the first evicted on Day 29.

=== Pavel ===
Pavel Takov is from Burgas. He entered the house on Day 1 and was the eighth evicted on Day 71.

=== Penyo ===
Penyo Daskalov is from Chirpan (born in Stara Zagora). He entered the house on Day 1 and was the sixth evicted on Day 64. Before entering the show, Penyo was given the secret task to pretend for a week that he was a woman. He was told that if his task was successful, he would be given a plastic surgery on his nose. Garo was given the task to help him with the task. However, it was unsuccessful, but later in the show he had the surgery on his nose.

=== Plamen ===
Plamen Varbanov is from Varna. He entered the house on Day 1 and walked on Day 8. On the first days in the house, when Plamen asked to leave, Big Brother offered him 5 000 leva to stay in the house for at least 14 more days. However, Plamen broke his promise and he returned the money.

=== Svetlana ===
Svetlana Stoycheva is from Popovo. She entered the house on Day 1 and was the fifth evicted on Day 57. Svetlana was pregnant when she entered the show. On the sixth week of Big Brother 3, she gave birth to her daughter Amber. They both returned in the House on Day 40 and lived in it until Svetlana's eviction.

=== Todor ===
Todor Karagiozov is from Sliven. He entered the house on Day 1 and was the tenth evicted on Day 80.

=== Violeta ===
Violeta Kondova "Vili" is from Brusartsi. She entered the house on Day 1 and finished second in the finale on Day 85. She is one of the oldest contestants in the history of Big Brother Bulgaria. During her stay in the show, she was 57 years old.

=== Vyara ===
Vyara Stancheva is from Blagoevgrad. She is one of the triplets. She entered the house on Day 1. During her and her sisters' secret task it was Vyara's identity, under which they had to live - during one of them was with the other housemates, pretending to be Vyara, the other two were in the secret rooms in the house. Their task was to trick the others that they were one and the same person. The mission of the triplets was successful, and they were allowed to stay in the house. She was the ninth evicted on Day 78.

== Nominations table ==
The first housemate in each box was nominated for two points, and the second housemate was nominated for one point. The triplets - Lyubov, Nadezhda and Vyara were nominate together, but be nominated separately by their fellow housemates.

	Week 3	Week 4	Week 5	Week 6	Week 7	Week 8	Week 9	Week 10	Week 11	Final		Nominations received
Lyubov	Mariola, Borislav	Diyana, Garo	Borislav, Lilyana	Lilyana, Paloma	Borislav, Lilyana	Svetlana, Lilyana	Lilyana, Paloma	Pavel, Boyan	Todor, Violeta	Winner (Day 85)		34
Violeta	Mariola, Pavel	Panayot, Lyubov	Diyana, Pavel	Borislav, Eva	Borislav, Eva	Lilyana, Paloma	Lilyana, Paloma	Pavel, Lilyana	Vyara, Todor	Runner-up (Day 85)		11
Lilyana	Mariola, Lyubov	Panayot, Lyubov	Garo, Vyara	Garo, Vyara	Lyubov, Nadezhda	Lyubov, Vyara	Vyara, Lyubov	Lyubov, Vyara	Boyan, Paloma	Third place (Day 85)		26
Paloma	Mariola, Panayot	Panayot, Lyubov	Lyubov, Todor	Vyara, Nadezhda	Vyara, Nadezhda	Vyara, Lyubov	Vyara, Lyubov	Lyubov, Vyara	Lilyana, Boyan	Fourth place (Day 85)		12
Boyan	Panayot, Penyo	Panayot, Paloma	Paloma, Penyo	Paloma, Lyubov	Lyubov, Paloma	Penyo, Paloma	Penyo, Nadezhda	Vyara, Lyubov	Lilyana, Todor	Fifth place (Day 85)		7
Todor	Nadezhda, Boyan	Svetlana, Eva	Violeta, Svetlana	Svetlana, Violeta	Vyara, Violeta	Nadezhda, Violeta	Lilyana, Paloma	Boyan, Violeta	Lyubov, Boyan	Evicted (Day 80)		9
Vyara	Mariola, Borislav	Diyana, Garo	Borislav, Lilyana	Lilyana, Paloma	Borislav, Lilyana	Svetlana, Lilyana	Lilyana, Paloma	Pavel, Lilyana	Lyubov, Violeta	Evicted (Day 78)		24
Pavel	Eva, Borislav	Todor, Borislav	Garo, Violeta	Violeta, Nadezhda	Eva, Boyan	Nadezhda, Vyara	Nadezhda, Penyo	Lyubov, Vyara	Evicted (Day 71)			12
Nadezhda	Mariola, Borislav	Diyana, Garo	Borislav, Lilyana	Lilyana, Paloma	Borislav, Lilyana	Svetlana, Lilyana	Lilyana, Paloma	Evicted (Day 64)				16
Penyo	Panayot, Mariola	Panayot, Pavel	Lilyana, Borislav	Borlsiav, Lilyana	Borislav, Lyubov	Svetlana, Lilyana	Lilyana, Paloma	Evicted (Day 64)				15
Svetlana	Diyana, Mariola	Diyana, Violeta	Diyana, Borislav	Garo, Borislav	Penyo, Todor	Penyo, Todor	Evicted (Day 57)					9
Borislav	Pavel, Paloma	Lyubov, Garo	Lyubov, Garo	Vyara, Lyubov	Lyubov, Nadezhda	Evicted (Day 50)						21
Eva	Panayot, Pavel	Diyana, Panayot	Diyana, Penyo	Garo, Penyo	Pavel, Penyo	Walked (Day 47)						8
Garo	Mariola, Panayot	Diyana, Panayot	Borislav, Eva	Eva, Borislav	Evicted (Day 43)							17
Diyana	Mariola, Penyo	Lyubov, Nadezhda	Garo, Lyubov	Evicted (Day 37)								16
Panayot	Mariola, Penyo	Garo, Penyo	Evicted (Day 29)									22
Mariola	Panayot, Nadezhda	Walked (Day 16)										16
Plamen	Walked (Day 8)											N/A
Notes	1, 2	1	1, 3	1, 4	1		5, 6	7	8	9		
Against public vote	Mariola, Panayot	Diyana, Panayot	~~Borislav~~, Diyana, Garo	Borislav, Garo	Borislav, Lyubov	Lilyana, Nadezhda, Penyo, Svetlana, Vyara	Lilyana & Paloma, Lyubov & Vyara, Nadezhda & Penyo	Lyubov, Pavel	Paloma, Violeta, Vyara	All; Housemates		
Walked	Plamen	Mariola	none			Eva	none					
Evicted	Mariola; 16 of 45 points to fake evict	Panayot; 76% to evict	Diyana; 51% to evict	Garo; 51% to evict	Borislav; 65% to evict	Svetlana; 52% to evict	Nadezhda & Penyo; 45% to evict	Pavel; 68% to evict	Vyara; 54% to evict	Todor; 9% (out of 6)	Lilyana; 16% (out of 4)	
Evicted	Mariola; 16 of 45 points to fake evict	Panayot; 76% to evict	Diyana; 51% to evict	Garo; 51% to evict	Borislav; 65% to evict	Svetlana; 52% to evict	Nadezhda & Penyo; 45% to evict	Pavel; 68% to evict	Vyara; 54% to evict	Boyan; 11% (out of 5)	Lilyana; 16% (out of 4)	
Evicted	Mariola; 16 of 45 points to fake evict	Panayot; 76% to evict	Diyana; 51% to evict	Garo; 51% to evict	Borislav; 65% to evict	Svetlana; 52% to evict	Nadezhda & Penyo; 45% to evict	Pavel; 68% to evict	Vyara; 54% to evict	Boyan; 11% (out of 5)	Violeta; 44% (out of 2)	
Evicted	Panayot; 16 of 45 points to fake evict	Panayot; 76% to evict	Diyana; 51% to evict	Garo; 51% to evict	Borislav; 65% to evict	Svetlana; 52% to evict	Nadezhda & Penyo; 45% to evict	Pavel; 68% to evict	Vyara; 54% to evict	Paloma; 16% (out of 4)	Violeta; 44% (out of 2)	
Evicted	Panayot; 16 of 45 points to fake evict	Panayot; 76% to evict	Diyana; 51% to evict	Garo; 51% to evict	Borislav; 65% to evict	Svetlana; 52% to evict	Nadezhda & Penyo; 45% to evict	Pavel; 68% to evict	Vyara; 54% to evict	Lyubov; 56% to win		

=== Notes ===
- ^Note 1 : The triplets nominate jointly but are nominated separately by the other housemates.
- ^Note 2 : The two nominated Housemates were sent into the two secret rooms in the House.
- ^Note 3 : Todor was elected the House President and he was given the power to save one of the nominees. He chose to save Borislav from eviction. This means that nominated for eviction this week are Diyana and Garo.
- ^Note 4 : Todor was immune as he is House President.
- ^Note 5 : Housemates were put into pairs of "Best Friends": these were Boyan and Pavel; Lilyana and Paloma; Lyubov and Vyara; Nadezhda and Penyo and Todor and Violeta. Each pair nominated had to nominate one of the other pairs for eviction.
- ^Note 6 : Vyara and Lyubov nominated together this week.
- ^Note 7 : The triplets were allowed to be nominated separately.
- ^Note 8 : This week the Housemates nominated the people they wanted to stay and not to be evicted. Therefore, the two or more Housemates with the fewest points would be automatically facing eviction.
- ^Note 9 : The public were voting for a winner between Boyan, Lilyana, Lubov, Paloma, Todor and Violeta. The Housemate with the fewest votes would be evicted on Day 80.
