= R&I =

R&I may refer to:

- Race and intelligence
- Remove and install, an operation in auto repair
- Research & Innovation, as in the name of the European Commission Directorate for Research and Innovation
- Restaurants & Institutions
- Rizzoli & Isles
- Risk & issues, commonly used in project risk management
- Restructuring & insolvency, used in the legal context

== See also ==
- RI (disambiguation)
- RNI (disambiguation)
