= Nõva =

Nõva may refer:

== Places in Estonia ==
- Nõva, Lääne County, village in Lääne-Nigula Parish, Lääne County
- Nõva, Tartu County, village in Peipsiääre Parish, Tartu County
- Nõva Parish, former municipality in Lääne County

== People ==
- Erika Nõva (1905–1987), Estonian architect

== See also ==
- Nova (disambiguation)
