= Big Brother 4 (Bulgarian season) =

- Season 4
- Presented by: Milen Tsvetkov; Rumen Lukanov
- No. of days: 84
- No. of housemates: 25
- Winner: Georgi Alurkov
- Runner-up: Natalia

Release
- Original network: Nova Television
- Original release: 22 September – 14 December 2008

Season chronology
- ← Previous; Season 3 Next → Season 5

Big Brother 4 was the fourth season of the reality show Big Brother in Bulgaria. It was aired on Nova Television and Nova+. The show launched on 22 September 2008 and continued for 3 months (12 weeks), ended on 14 December 2008, lasted for total of 84 days which is the shortest regular Big Brother season so far in Bulgaria.

The prize was 300,000 leva, which was the highest in the history of Big Brother Bulgaria. Milen Tsvetkov was the host of the show.

Former VIP Brother 2 housemate Veneta Raykova was the host of a new late-night talk-show called Little Sister. Rumen Lukanov was the host of the interactive part of the show.

The show was aired at 20:00 from Monday to Saturday. Weekly live shows are on Monday and Thursday. And after 22:30 on Sunday. Nova+ aired short live stream from the house at 10:00, 13:00, 16:00, 19:00 and 22:30. Replay episodes aired on Nova Television were broadcast at 18:00 the next day. The talk show Little Sister was aired on Monday and Thursday at 23:45.

Georgi Alurkov is the winner of this season.

== Housemates ==
From 22 June 2008 until 22 July 2008, auditions were held in the ten biggest cities in Bulgaria – Pleven, Veliko Tarnovo, Rousse, Shumen, Varna, Bourgas, Stara Zagora, Plovdiv, Blagoevgrad and Sofia. 13,955 candidates in total showed, 2,700 of which were in Sofia. The third and final round of the auditions was held in Sofia from 20 July 208 to 10 August 2008, with 415 candidates.

On 15 September 2008, ten of the selected housemates were isolated in separate secret places. Ten women entered the house on 22 September 2008. Originally, an eleventh housemate – Neli was expected to enter the house. However, she lost consciousness before entering the show and was decided not to take part. Instead, Violeta entered the show the next day.

Eleven men entered the house on Day 4. On Day 10, one of them – Tsvetan, was sent into the women's part of the house, and one of the women – Irena, into the men's.

Two new housemates – Ventsislav and Denislav, entered the house on Day 53. Denislav was chosen by the viewers, and Ventsislav – by the female housemates in the house.

| Name | Age | Occupation | Residence | Day entered | Day exited | Status |
|---|---|---|---|---|---|---|
| Georgi Georgiev Alurkov | 28 | Gardener | Sofia | 4 | 84 | Winner |
| Natalia Atanasova Mihaylova | 30 | Shop manager | Shumen | 1 | 84 | Runner-up |
| Daniela Georgieva Kostova | 28 | | Sofia | 1 | 84 | Third Place |
| Denislav Minev | 23 | Businessman | Shumen | 53 | 84 | Fourth Place |
| Tanya Kirilova Velkova | 21 | Unemployed | Altimir | 1 | 81 | Evicted |
| Samie Khyuseinova Dzheferova | 56 | Nurse and supermarket cashier | Ruse | 1 | 78 | Evicted |
| Ventsislav Nikolov Daskalov | 27 | Merchant | Plovdiv | 53 | 74 | Evicted |
| Ivanina Plamenova Koleva | 21 | Student | Haskovo | 1 | 71 | Evicted |
| Martin Rusev Ivanov | 24 | Tailor | Harmanli | 4 | 67 | Evicted |
| Filip Shterev Ralev | 31 | SSM mechanic | Sozopol | 4 | 64 | Evicted |
| Violeta Peneva Peneva | 28 | Croupier | Plovdiv | 2 | 60 | Evicted |
| Konstantin Antonov Mihaylov | 32 | Dry construction worker | Varna | 12 | 57 | Evicted |
| Umberto Nave Dasilva | 27 | Commercial | Paris, France | 4 | 50 | Evicted |
| Jeni Kraycheva Chervenkova | 47 | Sales manager | Shumen | 1 | 50 | Evicted |
| Tsvetan Dimitrov Hristov | 40 | Bodyguard, actor | Varna | 4 | 43 | Evicted |
| Ivan Iliev Gyumishev | 58 | Trader and tourist | Lom | 4 | 39 | Evicted |
| Vladimir Stanislavov Ivanov | 28 | Bank employee | Dobrich | 4 | 38 | Evicted |
| Kamen Nikolaev Tonov | 22 | Peacekeeper | Pleven | 4 | 37 | Evicted |
| Mila Zdravkova Petrova | 35 | | Shumen | 1 | 36 | Evicted |
| Emilia Alexieva Arabadzhieva | 29 | Psychologist and sales coordinator | Veliko Turnovo | 1 | 29 | Evicted |
| Irena Vasileva Ivanova | 24 | Fashion agency owner | Burgas | 1 | 22 | Evicted |
| Petar Ivanov Georgiev | 23 | Assistant printer | Plovdiv | 4 | 22 | Evicted |
| Angelina Antonova Angelova | 18 | Student | Plovdiv | 1 | 15 | Walked |
| Danail Kirilov Panchev | 37 | Comedian | Sofia | 4 | 8 | Ejected |
| Daniel Ankov Delchev | 25 | Builder | Sliven | 4 | 8 | Ejected |
| Neli Nikolaeva Hristova | 25 | Unemployed | Plovdiv | Reserved; Guest on Day 81 | | |

=== Angelina ===
Angelina Angelova is from Plovdiv. She entered the house on Day 1 and left voluntarily on Day 15, just a few minutes after moving into the house.

=== Danail ===
Danail Panchev is from Sofia. He entered the house on Day 4 and was ejected on Day 8, after a fight with Daniel.

=== Daniel ===
Daniel Delchev is from Sliven. He entered the house on Day 4 and was ejected on Day 8, after a fight with Danail.

=== Daniela ===
Daniela Kostova is from Sofia. She entered the house on Day 1 and finished third in the finale on Day 84.

=== Denislav ===
Denislav Minev is from Shumen. He entered the house on Day 53, after being chosen by the viewers. His girlfriend is the Bulgarian pop-folk singer Sonya Nemska, who was in the house for a few minutes during one of the housemates' week task. He finished fourth in the finale on Day 84.

=== Emilia ===
Emilia Arabadzhieva is from Ruse. She entered the house on Day 1 and was the third evicted on Day 29.

=== Filip ===
Filip Ralev from Sozopol entered the show on Day 4, posing as the mentally disabled man Toshko from Grudovo. When he entered the studio, the viewers and audience were not told about this, and they only learned the truth about Toshko when Big Brother called him in the Diary Room to confirm his secret mission: to fool all housemates into thinking he really has mental disabilities. He was the thirteenth evicted on Day 64.

=== Georgi ===
Georgi Alurkov is from Sofia. He entered the house on Day 4 and became a winner on Day 84.

=== Irena ===
Irena Ivanova is from Burgas. She entered the house on Day 1 and was the second evicted on Day 22.

=== Ivan ===
Ivan Gyumishev is from Lom. He entered the house on Day 4 and was the seventh evicted on Day 39.

=== Ivanina ===
Ivanina Koleva is from Haskovo. She entered the house on Day 1 and was the fifteenth evicted on Day 71.

=== Jeni ===
Jeni Chervenkova is from Shumen. She entered the house on Day 1 and was the ninth evicted on Day 50.

=== Kamen ===
Kamen Tonov is from Pleven. He entered the house on Day 4 and was the fifth evicted on Day 37.

=== Konstantin ===
Konstantin Mihaylov is from Varna. He entered the show on Day 12 and was the first housemate to live in the new house. He was the eleventh evicted on Day 57.

=== Martin ===
Martin Ivanov is from Harmanli. He entered the house on Day 4 and was the fourteenth evicted on Day 67.

=== Mila ===
Mila Petrova is from Shumen. She entered the house on Day 1 and was the fourth evicted on Day 36. She was the first blind housemate in the history of Big Brother Bulgaria.

=== Natalia ===
Natalia Mihaylova is from Shumen. She entered the house on Day 1 and finished second in the finale on Day 84.

=== Neli ===
Neli Hristova is from Plovdiv. She was supposed to enter the house on Day 1, but she lost consciousness just before entering the show. The producers and the medical team decided that it was better not to take part in the show, and became a reserve. However, she entered the house on Day 81 for one night with all ex-housemates from the season.

=== Petar ===
Petar Georgiev is from Plovdiv. He entered the house on Day 4 and was the first evicted on Day 22.

=== Samie ===
Samie Dzheferova is from Ruse. She entered the house on Day 1 and was the seventeenth evicted on Day 78.

=== Tanya ===
Tanya Velkova is from Altimir. She entered the house on Day 1 and was the eighteenth evicted on Day 81 after receiving the fewest positive votes from the viewers.

=== Tsvetan ===
Tsvetan Hristov is from Varna. He entered the house on Day 4 and was the eighth evicted on Day 43.

=== Umberto ===
Umberto Dasilva is from Paris. He entered the house on Day 4 and was the tenth evicted on Day 50.

=== Ventsislav ===
Ventsislav Daskalov is from Plovdiv. He entered the house on Day 53, after he was chosen by the female housemates in the house. He was the sixteen evicted on Day 74.

=== Violeta ===
Violeta Peneva is from Plovdiv. She entered the house on Day 2, replaced Neli. She was the twelfth evicted on Day 60.

=== Vladimir ===
Vladimir Ivanov is from Dobrich. He entered the house on Day 4 and was the sixth evicted on Day 38.

== Weekly summary and highlights ==
| Week 1 | Twists | Day 1 – 10 women entered the house. They were sent into the garden to live among an airplane's wrackage. |
| Week 1 | Entrances | Angelina, Daniela, Emilia, Irena, Ivanina, Jeni, Mila, Natalia, Samie and Tanya entered the house on Day 1. Violeta entered the house on Day 2. 11 men entered the house on Day 4 – Danail, Daniel, Filip, Georgi, Ivan, Kamen, Martin, Petar, Tsvetan, Umberto and Vladimir. The men and the women lived separated into two different airplane wrackages. |
| Week 1 | Up for eviction | The women nominated Irena and Jeni. They didn't know that viewers were voting which one of them to move into the men's place. |
| Week 2 | Up for eviction | The men nominated Umberto and Kamen, Tsvetan was nominated by Big Brother. Viewers were voting which one of them to live with the women. |
| Week 2 | Entrances | Konstantin entered the house on Day 12. |
| Week 2 | Exits | Danail and Daniel were ejected on Day 8. |
| Week 3 | Up for eviction | Irena, Umberto, Petar and Tsvetan |
| Week 3 | Birthdays | On 11 October Jeni celebrated her 48th birthday. There was a party in the house. |
| Week 3 | Exits | Angelina walked on Day 15, just a few minutes after moving into the house. |

== Nominations table ==
The first housemate listed is nominated for two points, while the second housemate is nominated for one point. The two or more housemates with the most nomination points face the public vote to evict.

On Day 81 all ex-housemates from this season entered the house for one night, including Neli, who was supposed to enter the show on Day 1. Meanwhile, the current housemates moved to the airplane wreckage again.

| | Week 2 | | Week 3 | Week 4 | Week 5 | Week 6 | Week 7 | Week 8 | Week 9 | | Week 10 | | Week 11 | | Final | | Nominations Received |
| | Day 8 | Day 9 | Week 3 | Week 4 | Week 5 | Week 6 | Week 7 | Week 8 | Day 57 | Day 60 | Day 64 | Day 67 | Day 71 | Day 74 | Final | | Nominations Received |
|---|---|---|---|---|---|---|---|---|---|---|---|---|---|---|---|---|---|
| Georgi | Exempt | Umberto, Kamen | Umberto, Kamen | Umberto, Konstantin | Nominated | Konstantin, Umberto | Umberto, Konstantin | Konstantin, Violeta | Filip, Violeta | Martin, Tanya | Martin, Natalia | Samie, Denislav | Denislav, Ventsislav | No; Nominations | Winner (Day 84) | | 7 |
| Natalia | Irena, Ivanina | Exempt | Irena, Tsvetan | Ivan, Tsvetan | Nominated | Konstantin, Tsvetan | Filip, Ivanina | Filip, Konstantin | Filip, Tanya | Denislav, Martin | Denislav, Martin | Ivanina, Denislav | Tanya, Denislav | No; Nominations | Runner-up (Day 84) | | 34 |
| Daniela | Tanya, Ivanina | Exempt | Irena, Tsvetan | Konstantin, Tsvetan | Nominated | Konstantin, Tsvetan | Konstantin, Filip | Konstantin, Filip | Filip, Martin | Martin, Denislav | Martin, Denislav | Denislav, Tanya | Denislav, Tanya | No; Nominations | Third place (Day 84) | | 11 |
| Denislav | Not in House | | | | | | | | Exempt | Natalia, Daniela | Natalia, Daniela | Natalia, Daniela | Ventsislav, Georgi | No; Nominations | Fourth place (Day 84) | | 17 |
| Tanya | Emilia, Natalia | Exempt | Petar, Kamen | Emilia, Violeta | Nominated | Filip, Konstantin | Konstantin, Umberto | Konstantin, Filip | Filip, Samie | Samie, Ventsislav | Natalia, Samie | Natalia, Ivanina | Ventsislav, Natalia | Nominated | Evicted (Day 81) | | 13 |
| Samie | Violeta, Angelina | Exempt | Jeni, Violeta | Jeni, Violeta | Nominated | Jeni, Violeta | Violeta, Konstantin | Violeta, Konstantin | Violeta, Daniela | Daniela, Ivanina | Ivanina, Daniela | Ivanina, Daniela | Ventsislav, Denislav | Nominated | Evicted (Day 78) | | 20 |
| Ventsislav | Not in House | | | | | | | | Exempt | Martin, Ivanina | Martin, Ivanina | Natalia, Ivanina | Tanya, Denislav | Evicted (Day 74) | | | 8 |
| Ivanina | Jeni; Natalia | Exempt | Tsvetan, Kamen | Tsvetan, Filip | Nominated | Konstantin, Tsvetan | Umberto, Konstantin | Konstantin, Filip | Filip, Samie | Samie, Georgi | Natalia, Georgi | Georgi, Natalia | Evicted (Day 71) | | | | 25 |
| Martin | Exempt | Kamen, Petar | Kamen, Petar | Tsvetan, Kamen | Nominated | Tsvetan, Konstantin | Konstantin, Ivanina | Konstantin, Violeta | Violeta, Filip | Natalia, Ivanina | Natalia, Daniela | Evicted (Day 67) | | | | | 23 |
| Filip | Exempt | Kamen, Petar | Petar, Irena | Kamen, Ivanina | Nominated | Umberto, Konstantin | Umberto, Konstantin | Violeta, Konstantin | Violeta, Ivanina | Ivanina, Martin | Evicted (Day 64) | | | | | | 34 |
| Violeta | Irena, Samie | Exempt | Irena, Samie | Ivan, Tsvetan | Exempt | Tsvetan, Konstantin | Konstantin, Umberto | Filip, Konstantin | Natalia, Ivanina | Evicted (Day 60) | | | | | | | 26 |
| Konstantin | Not in House | | Exempt | Mila, Samie | Nominated | Filip, Samie | Violeta, Filip | Filip, Violeta | Evicted (Day 57) | | | | | | | | 51 |
| Umberto | Exempt | Kamen, Ivan | Filip, Petar | Vladimir, Martin | Nominated | Konstantin, Tsvetan | Ivanina, Daniela | Evicted (Day 50) | | | | | | | | | 33 |
| Jeni | Irena, Natalia | Exempt | Irena, Tsvetan | Tsvetan, Konstantin | Nominated | Konstantin, Samie | Konstantin, Umberto | Evicted (Day 50) | | | | | | | | | 12 |
| Tsvetan | Exempt | Umberto, Georgi | Natalia, Umberto | Emilia, Natalia | Nominated | Violeta, Konstantin | Evicted (Day 43) | | | | | | | | | | 30 |
| Ivan | Exempt | Umberto, Petar | Umberto, Natalia | Natalia, Emilia | Nominated | Evicted (Day 39) | | | | | | | | | | | 7 |
| Vladimir | Exempt | Umberto, Tsvetan | Umberto, Jeni | Umberto, Emilia | Nominated | Evicted (Day 38) | | | | | | | | | | | 3 |
| Kamen | Exempt | Martin, Filip | Mila, Umberto | Emilia, Mila | Nominated | Evicted (Day 37) | | | | | | | | | | | 16 |
| Mila | Irena, Samie | Exempt | Irena, Tsvetan | Tsvetan, Konstantin | Nominated | Evicted (Day 36) | | | | | | | | | | | 8 |
| Emilia | Mila, Samie | Exempt | Irena, Tsvetan | Tsvetan, Ivan | Evicted (Day 29) | | | | | | | | | | | | 12 |
| Irena | Jeni, Natalia | Exempt | Emilia, Natalia | Evicted (Day 22) | | | | | | | | | | | | | 23 |
| Petar | Exempt | Martin, Filip | Samie, Martin | Evicted (Day 22) | | | | | | | | | | | | | 9 |
| Angelina | Irena, Tanya | Exempt | Walked (Day 15) | | | | | | | | | | | | | | 1 |
| Danail | Exempt | Ejected (Day 8) | | | | | | | | | | | | | | | 0 |
| Daniel | Exempt | Ejected (Day 8) | | | | | | | | | | | | | | | 0 |
| Notes | 1 | 2 | 3 | none | 4 | none | 5 | none | | 6 | none | | | 7 | none | | |
| Against public vote | Irena, Jeni | Kamen, Tsvetan, Umberto | Irena, Petar, Tsvetan, Umberto | Emilia, Tsvetan | Georgi, Mila, Tsvetan, Umberto | Konstantin, Tsvetan | Georgi, Jeni, Konstantin, Umberto | Filip, Konstantin | Filip, Violeta | Filip, Ivanina, Martin | Martin, Natalia | Ivanina, Natalia | Denislav, Ventsislav | Samie, Tanya | All; Housemates | | |
| Against public vote | Irena, Jeni | Kamen, Tsvetan, Umberto | Irena, Petar, Tsvetan, Umberto | Emilia, Tsvetan | Filip, Kamen, Konstantin, Samie | Konstantin, Tsvetan | Georgi, Jeni, Konstantin, Umberto | Filip, Konstantin | Filip, Violeta | Filip, Ivanina, Martin | Martin, Natalia | Ivanina, Natalia | Denislav, Ventsislav | Samie, Tanya | All; Housemates | | |
| Against public vote | Irena, Jeni | Kamen, Tsvetan, Umberto | Irena, Petar, Tsvetan, Umberto | Emilia, Tsvetan | Daniela, Martin, Tanya, Vladimir | Konstantin, Tsvetan | Georgi, Jeni, Konstantin, Umberto | Filip, Konstantin | Filip, Violeta | Filip, Ivanina, Martin | Martin, Natalia | Ivanina, Natalia | Denislav, Ventsislav | Samie, Tanya | All; Housemates | | |
| Against public vote | Irena, Jeni | Kamen, Tsvetan, Umberto | Irena, Petar, Tsvetan, Umberto | Emilia, Tsvetan | Ivan, Ivanina, Jeni, Natalia | Konstantin, Tsvetan | Georgi, Jeni, Konstantin, Umberto | Filip, Konstantin | Filip, Violeta | Filip, Ivanina, Martin | Martin, Natalia | Ivanina, Natalia | Denislav, Ventsislav | Samie, Tanya | All; Housemates | | |
| Walked | none | | Angelina | none | | | | | | | | | | | | | |
| Ejected | none | Daniel, Danail | none | | | | | | | | | | | | | | |
| Evicted | Irena; Most votes to move | Tsvetan; Most votes to move | Petar; Most votes to evict | Emilia; Most votes to evict | Mila; Fewest votes to save | Tsvetan; Most votes to evict | Jeni; 36% to evict | Konstantin; 51.4% to evict | Violeta; 52.9% to evict | Filip; 46.1% to evict | Martin; 50.5% to evict | Ivanina; 57.3% to evict | Ventsislav; 52.6% to evict | Samie; Most votes to evict | Tanya; Fewest votes (out of 5) | Denislav; Fewest votes (out of 4) | |
| Evicted | Irena; Most votes to move | Tsvetan; Most votes to move | Petar; Most votes to evict | Emilia; Most votes to evict | Kamen; 21% to save | Tsvetan; Most votes to evict | Jeni; 36% to evict | Konstantin; 51.4% to evict | Violeta; 52.9% to evict | Filip; 46.1% to evict | Martin; 50.5% to evict | Ivanina; 57.3% to evict | Ventsislav; 52.6% to evict | Samie; Most votes to evict | Daniela; Fewest votes (out of 3) | Natalia; Fewest votes (out of 2) | |
| Evicted | Irena; Most votes to move | Tsvetan; Most votes to move | Irena; Most votes to evict | Emilia; Most votes to evict | Vladimir; 17.3% to save | Tsvetan; Most votes to evict | Umberto; 31.9% to evict | Konstantin; 51.4% to evict | Violeta; 52.9% to evict | Filip; 46.1% to evict | Martin; 50.5% to evict | Ivanina; 57.3% to evict | Ventsislav; 52.6% to evict | Samie; Most votes to evict | Daniela; Fewest votes (out of 3) | Natalia; Fewest votes (out of 2) | |
| Evicted | Irena; Most votes to move | Tsvetan; Most votes to move | Irena; Most votes to evict | Emilia; Most votes to evict | Ivan; 13.7% to save | Tsvetan; Most votes to evict | Umberto; 31.9% to evict | Konstantin; 51.4% to evict | Violeta; 52.9% to evict | Filip; 46.1% to evict | Martin; 50.5% to evict | Ivanina; 57.3% to evict | Ventsislav; 52.6% to evict | Samie; Most votes to evict | Georgi; Most votes to win | | |

=== Notes ===
- ^Note 1 : Only the women nominated and were able to get nominated in the first week.
- ^Note 2 : Only the men nominated and were able to get nominated in the second week.
- ^Note 3 : Big Brother decided that four people will be nominated, and two of them will be evicted.
- ^Note 4 : Big Brother divided all the Housemates into 4 groups – green, yellow, red and blue. One member of each group was evicted – on Day 36, Day 37, Day 38 and Day 39. The 17th Housemate – Violeta, took the black ball and was immune from eviction.
- ^Note 5 : Georgi and Jeni were nominated by Big Brother for discussing the nominations.
- ^Note 6 : Filip was nominated by Big Brother for discussing the nominations.
- ^Note 7 : Tanya and Samie were nominated by the viewers.

== The house ==
Originally, it was planned either Big Brother 4 or VIP Brother 3 to air in the beginning of 2008. However, the start of a new season has been delayed due to the competition for the building company. Big Brother 4 was recorded in a new house near Sofia in the village of Novi Khan, as the old one has been destroyed.

There was a secret room, two bathrooms and a shop. The total area of the house is 3000 km^{2}. There was a fireplace at the middle of the garden. There was the airplane wrackage, where the housemates lived.

A total of 70 cameras was following the new housemates' every move.
