= Milen Tsvetkov =

Bulgarian journalist and television host (1966–2020)

- Born: 30 July 1966; Sofia, Bulgaria
- Died: 19 April 2020 (aged 53); Sofia, Bulgaria

Milen Tsvetkov (Bulgarian: Милен Цветков; 30 July 1966 – 19 April 2020) was a Bulgarian journalist and television host.

== Biography ==
Tsvetkov was born in Sofia. From March 2011 to July 2018, he was the host of his own talk show on Nova Television, titled Milen Tsvetkov's Hour. In 2008, it was announced that he would be the new host of the fourth season of Big Brother (airing on the same channel), replacing former host Niki Kunchev for only one season.

Tsvetkov died at age 53 in a car accident in Sofia which was caused by a driver under the influence of drugs.
