= Nova Televisión =

Colombian television channel

Nova Televisión is a Colombian local television channel based in Bogotá. Its broadcasting licence was granted by the National Television Commission on 15 September 2004. It is owned by Corporación Nova Comunicazioni, an Italian-Colombian non-profit company.
