= Novo (surname) =

Novo is a Portuguese and Galician surname. Notable people with the surname include:

- Álvaro Novo (born 1978), Spanish footballer
- Emanuel Novo (born 1992), Portuguese footballer
- Ferruccio Novo (1897–1974), Italian footballer
- Honório Novo (born 1950), Portuguese politician
- Ignacio Novo Sampol, Cuban exile and militant
- Luís Novo (born 1970), Portuguese long-distance runner
- Nacho Novo (born 1979), Spanish footballer
- Nancho Novo (born 1958), Spanish actor
- Pelayo Novo (born 1990), Spanish footballer
- Salvador Novo (1904–1974), Mexican writer and poet
