= Novy (surname) =

Novy or Nový (Czech feminine: Nová) is Czech surname meaning 'new'. Notable people with the surname include:

- Frederick George Novy (1864–1957), American pioneer bacteriologist
- Jeremy Novy (fl. 2006), American street artist
- Lili Novy (1885–1958), Slovene poet
- Tom Novy (born 1970), German DJ and producer
- Milan Nový (born 1951), Czech ice hockey player
- Miroslav Nový, Czech ice hockey player
- Oldřich Nový (1899–1983), Czech actor
- Richard Nový (born 1937), Czech rower
