= NOVA-MBA Association =

American nonprofit organization

- Formation: 2001
- Type: Alumni association, Research institute, Think tank
- Headquarters: New York City, United States
- Location: Global
- Members: ~1,500
- Official language: Italian, English
- Budget: $88,946 (2010)
- Staff: 25 officers
- Website: nova-mba.org

NOVA-MBA Association is a nonprofit organization established in 2001 by students from Ivy-League schools with the support of top Italians abroad including Nobel Prize Franco Modigliani and other prominent academic and business leaders. The association is focused on promoting higher education, meritocracy, management culture as well as actively organizing ways to engage both MBA students as well as alumni into a cohesive and engaged network.

The organization's mission is to "Facilitate the participation of Italian Talents to top MBA programs, contribute to the success of Italy and Italian Companies by promoting Italian MBA students and alumni recruiting, and create a strong, lasting and highly valuable network of successful executives, entrepreneurs and professionals among Italian MBA students and alumni".

Since 2022 it's part of NOVA Foundation together with Mentors4u, the largest european mentoring program.

== Membership ==
=== Member schools ===
NOVA membership has historically been restricted to Italian MBA graduates of the seventeen US institutions included in the list below. As of 2024, prestigious European institutions, such as INSEAD and London Business School, have been included as members.

Business School	University
Booth School of Business	University of Chicago
Columbia Business School	Columbia University
Daniels College of Business	University of Denver
Fuqua School of Business	Duke University
Haas School of Business	University of California, Berkeley
Harvard Business School	Harvard University
Kelley School of Business	Indiana University
Kellogg School of Management	Northwestern University
McCombs School of Business	University of Texas at Austin
MIT Sloan School of Management	Massachusetts Institute of Technology
New York University Stern School of Business	New York University
Samuel Curtis Johnson Graduate School of Management	Cornell University
Stanford Graduate School of Business	Stanford University
Tepper School of Business	Carnegie Mellon University
Tuck School of Business	Dartmouth College
UCLA Anderson School of Management	University of California, Los Angeles
Wharton School of the University of Pennsylvania	University of Pennsylvania
London Business School	University of London
INSEAD	INSEAD

However, graduates of other programs figuring in the list of United States graduate business school rankings, and most notably the Yale School of Management, the Ross School of Business, and the Darden Graduate School of Business Administration are generally accepted as well.

Note that all six Ivy League business schools are included (Wharton, Tuck, HBS, CBS, Cornell, Yale). Brown University and Princeton University do not have business schools (although Brown offers a joint Executive MBA program with Spain's Instituto de Empresa Business School).

As of 2012, the association is in the process of evaluating extending membership to graduates of Top European MBAs as well (such as INSEAD, IMD and others).

=== Student clubs in US MBA Programs ===
As of 2012, an Italian student club formally affiliated with NOVA exists only at Columbia Business School.

In other MBA programs, the number of Italian students is typically less than 3-4 per year, which usually implies that Italian clubs do not formally exist, and students are typically part of broader European groups, such as, for example, Harvard Business School's European Club.

=== Size of membership base ===
It is estimated that a total of ~2,000 Italians have obtained MBA degrees from top US universities from 1950 to 2012, or roughly 30 students per year. The number of graduating Italian students in top MBA programs varies significantly on a year by year basis and peaked at 86 for the class of 2010.

As of 2012, NOVA had a total of ~1,500 registered members in its website database. Given the general preference of Italian students for Northeast US business school, New York City- and Boston-based schools (Columbia, NYU, Harvard, MIT) have the largest number of alumni in the association.

=== Notable members ===
Notable NOVA members include ENI CEO Paolo Scaroni, Telecom Italia and Assicurazioni Generali chairman Gabriele Galateri di Genola, Vodafone Group CEO Vittorio Colao, and former Italian Minister of Economic Development Corrado Passera.

== Yearly conference ==
Arguably, the most notable event hosted by the association is its yearly conference. Since 1999, the association has hosted a conference each year in the US. In 2011 two conferences were hosted - one in Italy for the 10th anniversary of the association and the regular conference in the US.

The NOVA conference typically attracts between 100-300 individuals among current students, MBA alumni, corporate recruiters, and guests. The format is generally a 2-day weekend event, with a gala dinner on the Saturday evening. The conference is held in Autumn, typically in October or November.

=== Location and theme ===
- 2023: Milan, IBM Studios: "Breaking Barriers, Building Bridges: Leadership responsabile per un futuro sostenibile"
- 2012: Boston: "WAKE UP ITALY!": "Strategies, opportunities and challenges to re-launch the growth of Italy"
- 10th Year Anniversary Event [2011]: "Milan, Italy / Una cultura della crescita e delle regole per salvare il Paese dalla catastrofe"
- 2011: New York, Columbia Business School / NYU, "Italian citizenship, European passport, Global competition"
- 2010: New York, Columbia Business School / NYU, "Italy 2020: Inspiring Our Future"
- 2009: Boston, MIT / Harvard Business School: "Relentless InNOVAtion - International perspectives at the crossroads of business, technology, and public policy" (in collaboration with the European Student Club Conference at HBS on 'Financing Innovation: VC/PE in Europe')
- 2008: New York, Columbia Business School / NYU : "Accelerating the Development of Italian Productivity: The Key Engines of Growth"
- 2007: New York, Columbia Business School / NYU: "Positive aspects of polarization: the Italian advantage"
- 2006: Stanford
- 2005: Boston, Harvard Business School / MIT
- 2004: New York, Columbia Business School / NYU
- 2003: Chicago/Kellogg/Wharton
- 2002: Boston, Harvard Business School / MIT
- 2001: New York, Columbia Business School / NYU

== Other activities and initiatives ==
=== Press Relations ===
NOVA officers and members regularly engage with the national and international press. Articles quoting NOVA officers and members have appeared in The Wall Street Journal, Time Magazine, Radio 24 (Italy), YouDem Tv.

NOVA historically had a partnership with leading Italian newspaper Corriere della Sera, with regular articles appearing until 2002.

=== Policy Affairs ===
NOVA officers publicly engage with Italian members of parliament on matters relevant to members of the association. Occasionally, this dialog happens through the press.

NOVA has been among the non-governmental associations contributing to the improvement and ongoing dialogue relative to the "Controesodo" bipartisan law, passed by the Italian Parliament in 2010 to incentivize the return of talented Italians to the country.

As of 2012, four officers were part of the Policy Affairs group.

=== Think Tank ===
As of 2012, the association is seeking funding to create a Think Tank centered on the study of managerial and entrepreneurial professions in Italy.

=== Other Activities ===
Besides the yearly conferences, NOVA-MBA also:

- Supports formal and informal alumni gatherings, mainly in the USA, Italy and the UK.
- Engages in initiatives to facilitate scholarships and access to credit for MBA candidates.

== Corporate governance ==
NOVA is a 501(c)(3) not-for-profit corporation, incorporated in New York State in 2002. NOVA is further recognized as a public charity by the IRS.

The association has five members currently serving a two-year term on its board and two honorary chairmen.

NOVA officers are nominated by the board for a two-year period, following an online poll among the entire membership base. The number and roles of officers varies from time to time; there are currently 25 officers volunteering for the association.
