= Nova, Cherepovetsky District, Vologda Oblast =

Nova Нова
- Village
- Location within Vologda Oblast Location within Russia
- Coordinates: 59°05′N 38°10′E
- Country: Russia
- Region: Vologda Oblast
- District: Cherepovetsky District
- Time zone: UTC+3:00

Nova (Russian: Нова) is a rural locality (a village) in Irdomatskoye Rural Settlement, Cherepovetsky District, Vologda Oblast, Russia. The population was 60 as of 2002. There are 30 streets.

== Geography ==
Nova is located 19 km (12 mi) southeast of Cherepovets (the district's administrative centre) by road. Irdomatka is the nearest rural locality.
