= Nova (given name) =

- Gender: Unisex

Origin
- Origin: Latin
- Meaning: new

Other names
- See also: Noova, Novah, Novalee, Novaleigh, Novalynn

Nova is a unisex given name of Latin origin meaning "new".

It is in regular use for both males and females. In the United States, the name has been in use since the 1800s. It first ranked among the top 1,000 names for newborn girls in the United States in 2011 and has been among the top 50 most used names for newborn American girls since 2017. Novah, a variant spelling, has ranked among the top 1,000 names given to girls recently as well. Elaborations of the name such as Novalee, Novalynn, and Novarae, all with many spelling variants, are also well used for American girls. It is one of several names currently in fashion for American girls that all contain the letter v. Nova was among the five most popular names for Black newborn girls in the American state of Virginia in 2022 and 2023. Noova is a Finnish variant.

It has also increased in usage for girls in European countries in recent years. It is among the top 100 names in The Netherlands and Sweden and among the top 200 names in Norway in recent years and is also increasing in use in the United Kingdom.

== Women ==
- Nova, stage name of Shaheeda Sinckler, winner of the 2020 Scottish Album of the Year Award
- Nova Kienast (born 2007), German hammer throw
- Nova Meierhenrich (born 1973), German television presenter
- Nova Miller (born 2001), Swedish singer, dancer, actress, and multi-instrumentalist
- Nova Paul (born 1973), New Zealand filmmaker
- Nova Peris (born 1971), Aboriginal Australian athlete and former politician
- Nova Pilbeam (1919-2015), British actress
- Nova Ren Suma (born 1975), American #1 New York Times best selling author of young adult novels
- Nova Rockafeller, stage name of Nova Leigh Paholek (born 1988), an independent Canadian rapper, singer, songwriter, and music video director
- Nova Stevens (born 1992), Canadian model and activist
- Nova Villa (born 1946), Filipino actress
- Nova Riyanti Yusuf (born 1977), Indonesian politician, psychiatrist, and writer

=== Fictional character ===
- Nova Clark, a character from the Sharknado film series.

== Men ==
- Nova (singer), a Puerto Rican reggaeton and hip hop singer, part of duo Nova & Jory
- Nova (wrestler) (born 1972), ring name of American pro wrestler Mike Bucci
- Nova Arianto (born 1978), Indonesian professional footballer of Chinese descent
- Nova Iriansyah (born 1963), Indonesian architect and politician
- Nova Spivack, American entrepreneur and author
- Nova Widianto (born 1977), Indonesian badminton player
