= Novas (surname) =

Novas is a surname. Notable people with the surname include:

- Fernando Novas (born 1960), Argentine paleontologist
- Himilce Novas (born 1944), Cuban-American writer
- Manuel de Novas (1938–2009), Cape Verdean poet and composer
- Yndys Novas (born 1977), Dominican volleyball player
