= Novo, Vladimir Oblast =

Novo Ново
- Village
- Location within Vladimir Oblast Location within Russia
- Coordinates: 56°17′N 42°18′E
- Country: Russia
- Region: Vladimir Oblast
- District: Vyaznikovsky District
- Time zone: UTC+3:00

Novo (Russian: Ново) is a rural locality (a village) in Gorod Vyazniki, Vyaznikovsky District, Vladimir Oblast, Russia. The population was 8 as of 2010.

== Geography ==
Novo is located near the Velikoye Lake, 17 km northeast of Vyazniki (the district's administrative centre) by road. Luzhki is the nearest rural locality.
