= Porto Novo (disambiguation) =

Porto Novo may refer to:

- Porto-Novo, the capital of Benin
- Porto Novo, Cape Verde, a city on the island of Santo Antão, Cape Verde
- Portonovo, a village in Sanxenxo, Galicia, Spain
- Porto Novo, the former name of Parangipettai, a town in Tamil Nadu, India
- Porto Novo do Cunha, the former name of Além Paraíba in the state of Minas Gerais, Brazil
- Porto Novo (album), a 1967 album by Marion Brown
