= NOVI University Of Applied Sciences =

University in The Netherlands

Coordinates: 52°05′26″N 5°08′52″E

NOVI University of Applied Sciences
- NOVI Hogeschool
- Motto: Dé hogeschool voor ICT
- Established: 1958
- General director: George Vlug
- Location: Utrecht, Netherlands
- Campus: Newtonlaan 247, 3584 BH Utrecht
- Website: www.novi.nl www.novi-education.de

NOVI University Of Applied Sciences, Dutch: NOVI (Nederlands Opleidingsinstituut Voor Informatica), is a private Dutch HBO (vocational higher education) university of applied science (Hogeschool) located in Utrecht with a branch in Maastricht. NOVI is the oldest Dutch educational institution for research in Information technology. Its roots go back to 1958 when the nonprofit foundation (stichting) Studiecentrum Administratieve Automatisering (SSAA) was established by several Dutch academics affiliated with the faculty of economics of the University of Amsterdam. The goal was to facilitate the automation of industry in the Netherlands. The SSAA created the first Dutch examination program in the field of administrative information management, the AMBI, in 1964. At the time of its creation, AMBI was the highest qualification possible in the field and the only one on HBO level. The SSAA adopted the name Studicentrum NOVI in 1971.

Due to financial problems in the early 1980s the stichting was dissolved and its education department was sold to private investors, continuing to function as a private teaching institution, achieving the statue of a Hogeschool (university of applied sciences) in 1997. The university offers bachelors in several IT fields including business informatics, software development and cyber security.

== History ==
In the 1950s, several Dutch academics sought to address the issue of scarce number of Dutch professionals knowledgeable in automation at a time when computers were being increasingly used for administrative applications. The roots of NOVI goes back to early 1958, when the American consulting agency John Diebold & Associates held a meeting at the Grand Hotel Krasnapolsky under the title "Course on Management for Automatic Data Processing". During the meeting, three Dutch economics, Hendrik Reinoud, Remmer Willem Starreveld, and the dean of the economics faculty of the University of Amsterdam Henri Johan van der Schroeff discussed the establishment of a study and documentation center to support the automation process in the Netherlands.

=== SSAA ===
During its general meeting on July 5, 1958, the economics faculty of the University of Amsterdam decided to establish the aforementioned center. Ten days later the Stichting Studiecentrum Administratieve Automatisering (SSAA) was officially established as a stichting (nonprofit foundation). The SSAA was financed by different benefactors, companies and institutions that were already dealing with automation or planning to start it. The importance of benefactors was reflected in the composition of the administrating bodies that ran the SSAA:

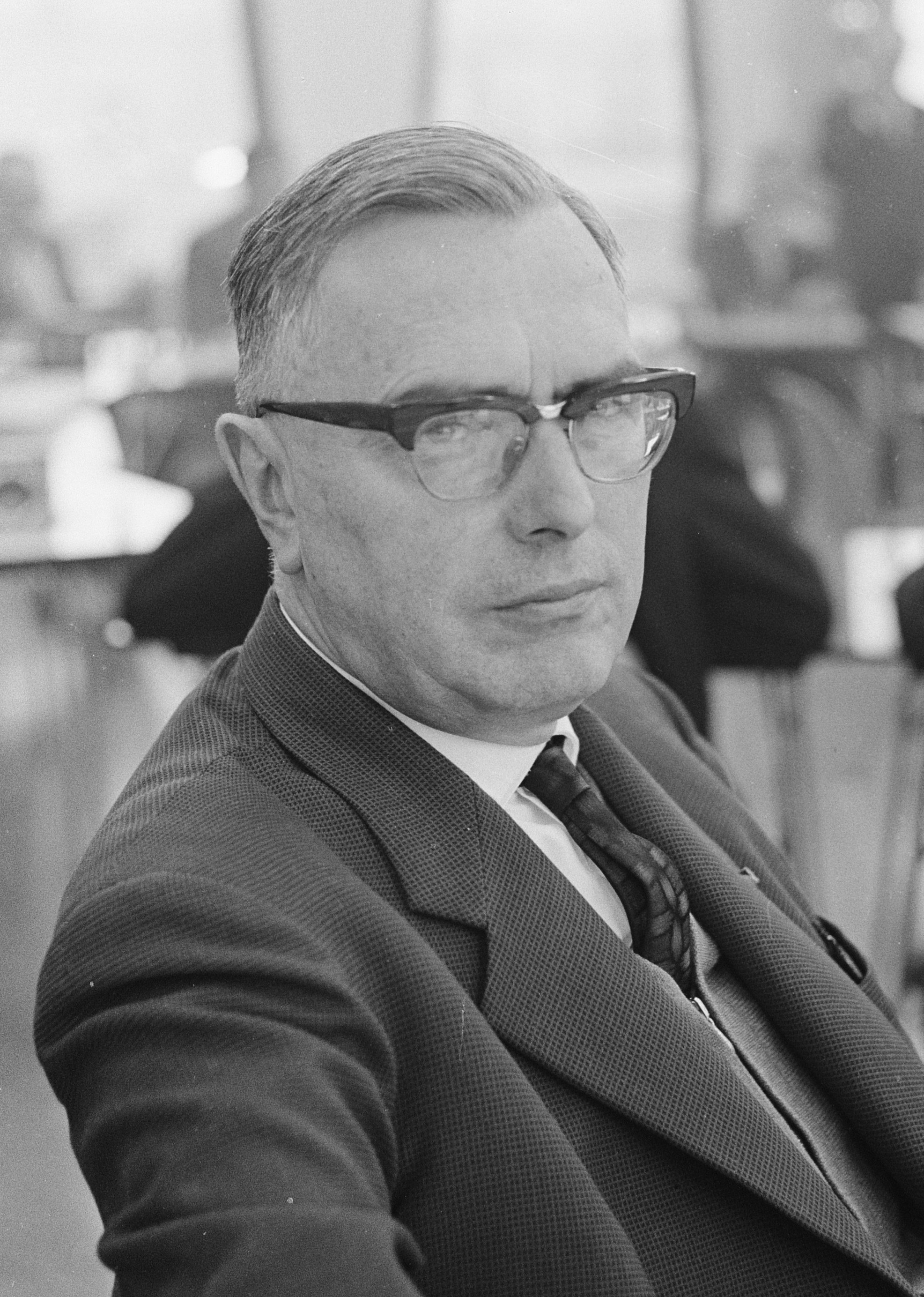
The Dutch mathematician and chess grandmaster Max Euwe became a director of the SSAA in 1959

-The general board (algemeen bestuur), which consisted of the representatives of the faculty of economics of the University of Amsterdam, benefactors and other comparable institutions that collaborated with the SSAA. (Note: Members of the first General Board included several academics such as Antoon Marius van Rietschoten and Abraham Goudeket in addition to the secretary of the Association of Importers and Manufacturers of Office Equipment (Vereniging van Importeurs en Fabrikanten van Kantoormachines - Vifka).)
-The executive board (dagelijks bestuur), which was elected by the general board and consisted of five members with van der Schroeff as chairman and Reinoud as vice chairman. Van der Schroeff understood that the success of the SSAA depended on the support of the Dutch industries and two seats of the executive board were given to representatives of different Dutch economic giants. (Note: The remaining three seats of the executive board were filled by Petrus Cornelis Breek, board member of Philips; Albert Thomas de Lange, the chairman of the Netherlands Institute for Accountancy (Nederlands Instituut voor Accountancy - NIVA); Coenraad Reenalda, administrator of the Nederlandsche Heidemaatschappij (today Arcadis).)
-The directorate (directorium) which consisted initially of Starreveld and Abraham Barend Frielink, then a third director, the Dutch chess grandmaster and academic Max Euwe, joined in 1959.

The SSAA initially invested itself with two primary tasks:

- Documentation: the SSAA established a library and documentation center on automation and was able to build up an initial collection and develop it into one of the best collections in Europe which was sold and spread through SSAA own journal "Informatie", established in 1959.
- Research: the SSAA conducted research at companies that had already gained experience with automation and all findings were regularly published.

==== Education activities of the SSAA ====
The SSAA focused on teaching professionals in various functions, from programmers to senior management. In 1963, the SSAA received the authority to conduct and certify exams (examenbevoegdheid) from the Ministerie van Economische Zaken (ministry of economic affairs) with the associated officially recognized diplomas, becoming the only Dutch private institute with such authority. The following year, in 1964, the SSAA started the training course AMBI - Automatisering en Mechanisering van de Bestuurlijke Informatievoorziening (Automation and Mechanization of Management Information Processing) to train middle and senior management in automation. The training consisted of a number of compulsory subjects. After successfully the aforementioned courses a student could take the exam. This was the highest possible qualification in the field at the time of its creation and was considered the only Dutch automation training at HBO level.

The former Dutch director-general of defense Sybrandus Dirk Duyverman became the general director of the SSAA in 1964 and the focus of the SSAA steadily went to education, which consisted, besides the AMBI, of different courses. This led to discontent amongst several academics involved with the organization, such as van der Schroeff and Frielink, because it came at the cost of research. In 1968, however, it became clear that financial considerations were becoming a serious problem due to inadequate governmental funding. In 1969, under the auspices of the SSAA the report "Opleiding Informatica", compiled by representatives of the entire computer science community in the Netherlands, was published. This report carried the message that education in computer sciences on HBO level (vocational higher education) was a necessity which led eventually to the establishment of HBO programs in computer sciences. (Note: The report was compiled by the Frielink Commission (named after the former director of the SSAA). In addition to major Dutch economic giants, several ministries were represented. The Dutch Minister of Education and Science Hans Grosheide opened the first meeting of the commission, stating that the commission would report to the board of the SSAA and not to the government. Nevertheless, the recommendations of the commission led to the government setting up its own commission for Wiskunde en Informatica in het Hoger Beroepsonderwijs (Mathematics and Computer Science in Higher Vocational Education) in 1970. Finally, in 1971, the Ministry of Education gave permission to two HBO universities in Eindhoven and Enschede to set up HBO programs in computer science.)

==== The establishment of NOVI as a subsidiary of the SSI ====
In 1970 the SSAA changed its name to Stichting het Nederlands Studiecentrum voor Informatica (SSI) which, in 1971, established the Nederlands Opleidingsinstituut voor Informatica (NOVI) as the department specialized in education within the SSI but working autonomously under direction of Bert van 't Klooster. This meant that Duyverman remained the general director of SSI but did not interfere with the educational activities anymore and SSI could focus on research.

In 1971 the SSI was on the brink of bankruptcy. The Ministerie van Binnenlandse Zaken (ministry of internal affairs) interfered and appointed Frans Kordes to investigate the situation. Out the investigation it became clear that, in addition to the number of benefactors not increasing since the sixties, the financial problems were also exacerbated by Duyverman's ambitions of expanding the SSAA internationally which led to increased costs and no profits. Duyverman's had to relinquish his authority and retired in 1972 and van 't Klooster stepped down while Groothof was appointed as a general director. The research department was abolished and all international activities were stopped. In return, the SSI received subsidies from the government. Due to the publicity NOVI received in short time, the SSI used the name Studiecentrum NOVI as its name and the stichting became mainly an educational institute. The reorganization saved the SSI and the AMBI program became a great success with the number of students at NOVI averaging 4000 students between 1975-1980.

=== NOVI as an independent institution (1982) and university of applied sciences (1997) ===
In 1982 the stichting Studiecentrum NOVI (SSI) went bankrupt. The education department (as NOVI Opleidingen) and the journal of the stichting (Informatie) were sold to Kluwer. The AMBI examination was taken over by a specially established stichting (known as the EXIN). NOVI continued as a private educational institution dedicated for the study of automation and IT. In 1997 NOVI was bought by Markus Verbeek Groep and in the same year, the board of NOVI Opleidingen established the NOVI Hogeschool as a university of applied science after receiving that status from the Dutch ministry of education. In 2013 a reorganization took place where the Hogeschool as an institute was separated from the courses (NOVI Opleidingen). Under this arrangement, accreditations for the courses would be held by the board of Hoger Onderwijs NOVI, which is the owner of the hogeschool that in returen functions as an executive organization for the teaching of the courses.
