= De novo =

De novo (Latin, lit. 'of new', used in English to mean 'from the beginning', 'anew') may refer to:

== Science and computers ==
- De novo mutation, a new germline mutation not inherited from either parent
- De novo protein design, the creation of a protein sequence that is not based on existing, natural sequences
- De novo protein structure prediction, the prediction of a protein's 3D structure, based only on its sequence
- De novo synthesis of complex molecules from simple molecules in chemistry
- De novo transcriptome assembly, the method of creating a transcriptome without a reference genome, using de novo sequence assembly
- De novo gene birth, the emergence of genes from non-coding sequence
- De novo domestication, the domestication of new species for human use
- De novo assembly in genomics
- De Novo classification, a pathway to classify new medical devices provided by the US Federal Food, Drug, and Cosmetic Act
- Denovo, a supercomputer project that simulates nuclear reactions; see Titan (supercomputer) § Projects

== Other ==
- De novo review, an appellate standard of review for legal issues
- Trial de novo, or a new trial in the legal system
- De novo bank, a state bank that has been in operation for five years or less
- De Novo, a public housing estate in Kai Tak, Hong Kong
- Denovo (band), a 1980s Italian new wave group
