= Big Brother 2 (Bulgarian season) =

- Season 2
- Presented by: Niki Kanchev; Evelina Pavlova
- No. of days: 92
- No. of housemates: 19
- Winner: Miroslav Atanasov
- Runner-up: Leonardo Bianchi

Release
- Original network: Nova Television
- Original release: 19 September – 19 December 2005

Season chronology
- ← Previous; Season 1 Next → Season 3

Big Brother 2 was the second season of the reality show Big Brother in Bulgaria. aired on Nova Television.

The show started on 19 September 2005 and ended on 19 December 2005. It was hosted by Niki Kanchev and Evelina Pavlova. The chief editor was Nikolay Nikolov, the director was Petko Spasov. The winner was Miroslav Atanasov who won 200 000 leva.

== Housemates ==
15 Housemates entered the House on Day 1, and another 1 on Day 8. Daniela, Leonardo and Maya entered on Day 51.

Name	Age	Occupation	Residence	Day entered	Day exited	Status
Miroslav Atanasov	25	Printer	Sofia	1	92	Winner
Leonardo "Leo" Bianchi	31	Restaurant owner	Ancona, Italy	51	92	Runner-up
Stefan Angelov Kemalov "Bat Sali"	28	Businessman	Kazanlak	1	92	Third Place
Zvezdelin Kochev Minchev "Vego"	40	Art director	Plovdiv	1	92	Fourth Place
Ivan Hristov Naydenov	35	Software engineer	Sofia/Bristol, UK	1	89	Evicted
Irena Vasileva	39	Manager	Sofia	1	87	Evicted
Daniela Petrova Dimitrova	24	Unknown	Blagoevgrad	51	85	Evicted
Elena Romele	39	Translator	Sofia	8	78	Evicted
Maya Yolianova Yotsova	19	Unemployed	Sofia	51	71	Evicted
Marian Zahariev	28	Hairdresser	Sofia	1	64	Evicted
Radomira Kosadzhieva	18	Waitress	Lom	1	57	Evicted
Miglena Stoyanova Kamenova	29	Economist / Unemployed	Gomotarci	1	50	Evicted
Plamena Georgieva Nikolaeva	21	Student	Ruse	1	43	Evicted
Elena Georgieva	23	Fashion designer	Sofia	1	38	Evicted
Silvia Dobreva Dragoeva	23	Unknown	Varna/Sofia	1	29	Evicted
Nedyalko Petkov Lazarov	31	Manager	Yambol	1	22	Evicted
Petko Ivanov Vasilev	27	Car dealer	Sofia	1	15	Evicted
Radoslav Stoyanov "Rado"	21	Fitness instructor	Petrich	1	8	Walked
Silva Lyubomirova Bratanova	20	Student	Sofia	1	8	Walked

=== Daniela ===
Daniela Dimitrova is from Blagoevgrad. She entered the house on Day 51 and was eleventh evicted on Day 85. Daniela celebrated her 25th birthday during her stay in the house. There was going to be a party with her favourite pop-folk singer Anelia. However, the party was cancelled as a punishment, because Ivan broke a major rule in the house - he covered the camera in the toilet in order to masturbate. Before entering the house, Daniela was given a secret task - to seduce one of the men in the house. The same mission was given to Maya. Daniela chose Miroslav. The jury, which had to decide whether their tasks were successful was Miroslav's wife - Elena. She recognized her task as successful, so Daniela was not nominated.

=== Elena G. ===
Elena Georgieva is from Sofia. She entered the house on Day 1 and was the fourth evicted on Day 37 (left on Day 38). She entered the house with her husband Miroslav. They were given a secret task by Big Brother - for a week not to tell anyone that they were married, even to pretend that they had never met before. Their task was successful. However, their marriage collapsed - Elena fell in love with another housemate - Marian. At the end, Miroslav won the money. However, they didn't cut their relationships and some people think they played a role in order to take the big prize.

=== Elena R. ===
Elena Romele is from Sofia. She entered the house on Day 8 - she was chosen by the viewers to enter the show. Before that, Elena was given a secret mission - to help the married couple save their secret. She was the tenth evicted on Day 78.

=== Irena ===
Irena Vasileva is from Sofia. She entered the house on Day 1 and was the twelfth evicted on Day 87.

=== Ivan ===
Ivan Naydenov is from Sofia (lives in Bristol). He entered the house on Day 1 and was the thirteenth evicted on Day 89, receiving the fewest positive votes.

=== Leonardo ===
Leonardo Bianchi "Leo" is from Ancona (Italy). He entered the house on Day 51 and finished second in the finale on Day 92. Leonardo was given a secret task - to make the other housemates nominate him with most negative points. This would immune him from being nominated. However, he failed the mission and was automatically nominated by Big Brother.

=== Marian ===
Marian Zahariev is from Sofia. He entered the house on Day 1 and was the eighth evicted on Day 64. He was involved in romantic relationships with two of his housemates - Elena and Maya. The mother of his daughter - Eva, was a contestant in Big Brother 3.

=== Maya ===
Maya Yotsova is from Sofia. She entered the house on Day 51 and was the ninth evicted on Day 71. Before entering the house, she was given the same task as Daniela - to seduce one of the male housemates. She chose Marian and her task was successful.

=== Miglena ===
Miglena Kamenova is from Gomotarci (near Vidin). She entered the house on Day 1 and was the sixth evicted on Day 50.

=== Miroslav ===
Miroslav Atanasov is from Sofia. He entered the house on Day 1 and became a winner on Day 92. He entered the house with his wife - Elena. They were given a secret mission.

=== Nedyalko ===
Nedyalko Lazarov is from Yambol. He entered the house on Day 1 and was the second evicted on Day 22.

=== Petko ===
Petko Vasilev is from Sofia. He entered the house on Day 1 and was the first evicted on Day 15.

=== Plamena ===
Plamena Nikolaeva is from Ruse. She entered the house on Day 1 and was the fifth evicted on Day 43.

=== Radomira ===
Radomira Kosadzhieva is from Lom. She entered the house on Day 1 and was the seventh evicted on Day 57.

=== Radoslav ===
Radoslav Stoyanov "Rado" is from Petrich. He entered the house on Day 1. On the very first night in the house, the housemates were given the task to decide which one of them not to receive his luggage during his/her whole stay in the house. Rado entered the show wearing underwear only, so he received the most votes. Rado left the house voluntarily on Day 8.

=== Silva B. ===
Silva Bratanova is from Sofia. She entered the house on Day 1 and walked on Day 8.

=== Silvia D. ===
Silvia Dragoeva is from Varna (lives in Sofia). She entered the house on Day 1 and was the third evicted on Day 29.

=== Stefan ===
Stefan Kemalov "Bat Sali" is from Kazanlak. He entered the house on Day 1 and finished third in the finale on Day 92. He is the first housemate of Gypsy origin.

=== Zvezdelin ===
Zvezdelin Minchev "Vego" is from Plovdiv. He entered the house on Day 1 and finished fourth in the finale on Day 92.

== Weekly summary and highlights ==
Week 1	Twists	Day 1 - 15 housemates entered the house and they were shocked to see it was empty, without any food and furniture in it. The housemates were told they had to choose which one of them not to receive his/her luggage during his/her stay. Elena G. and Miroslav were given the secret task to hide the fact they were married.
Week 2	Up for eviction	Petko, Nedyalko and Miglena (originally Petko, Plamena and Miglena, but Nedyalko was punished for discussing the nominations)
Week 2	Tasks	Karaoke
Week 2	Entrances	Elena R. entered the House on Day 8
Week 2	Birthdays	On 26 September, Stefan celebrated his 29th birthday. There was a party in the house.
Week 2	Exits	Silva B. and Radoslav walked on Day 8
Week 3	Up for eviction	Nedyalko and Silvia D.
Week 3	Major events	Big Brother told the housemates that Elena G. and Miroslav were married
Week 3	Exits	Petko was evicted on Day 15
Week 4	Up for eviction	Zvezdelin and Silvia
Week 4	Exits	Nedyalko was evicted on Day 22
Week 5	Up for eviction	Elena G., Miroslav and Miglena
Week 5	Exits	Silvia D. was evicted on Day 29
Week 6	Up for eviction	Miroslav, Zvezdelin and Plamena
Week 6	Exits	Elena G. was evicted on Day 37 (left on Day 38)
Week 7	Up for eviction	Miroslav and Miglena
Week 7	Exits	Plamena was evicted on Day 43
Week 8	Up for eviction	Miroslav and Radomira
Week 8	Entrances	Maya, Daniela and Leonardo entered the house
Week 8	Twists	Maya and Daniela were given secret tasks - to seduce one male housemate. Maya chose Maryan, Daniela - Miroslav.
Week 8	Task	The men had to dress like their female housemates and the women had to dress like their male housemates
Week 8	Exits	Miglena was evicted on Day 50
Week 9	Up for eviction	Marian, Leonardo, Irena and Zvezdelin (Maryan was automatically nominated, because he refused to nominate other housemates)
Week 9	Twists	Leonardo was given the secret task to force the other housemates to nominate him with most negative points. His tasks was unsuccessful and Leo was automatically nominated by BB.
Week 9	Tasks	Blind granma
Week 9	Birthdays	Daniela celebrated her 25th birthday on 18 November. There was going to be a party with her favourite pop-folk singer Anelia. However, the party was cancelled as a punishment, because Ivan broke a major rule in the house - he covered the camera in the toilet in order to masturbate.
Week 9	Exits	Radomira was evicted on Day 57
Week 10	Up for eviction	Maya and Daniela
Week 10	Tasks	Soap opera

== Nominations table ==
The first housemate in each box was nominated for two points, and the second housemate was nominated for one point.

	Week 1	Week 2	Week 3	Week 4	Week 5	Week 6	Week 7	Week 8	Week 9	Week 10	Week 11	Week 12	Final		Nominations received
Miroslav	No; Nominations	Miglena, Plamena	Radomira, Miglena	Zvezdelin, Miglena	Miglena, Irena	Plamena, Miglena	Miglena, Radomira	Radomira, Marian	Marian, Elena R.	Elena R., Maya	Elena R., Daniela	Leonardo, Daniela	Winner (Day 92)		34
Leonardo	Not in House							Exempt	Elena R., Irena	Maya, Daniela	Miroslav, Elena R.	Irena, Zvezdelin	Runner-up (Day 92)		10
Stefan	No; Nominations	Silvia D., Zvezdelin	Silvia D., Marian	Ivan, Silvia D.	Elena G., Miroslav	Marian, Miroslav	Irena, Miroslav	Marian, Miroslav	Marian, Irena	Maya, Daniela	Daniela, Elena R.	Daniela, Leonardo	Third place (Day 92)		2
Zvezdelin	No; Nominations	Plamena, Ivan	Ivan, Silvia D.	Ivan, Silvia D.	Ivan, Elena G.	Miroslav, Ivan	Ivan, Miroslav	Miroslav, Elena R.	Elena R., Irena	Daniela, Elena R.	Elena R. Daniela	Daniela, Leonardo	Fourth place (Day 92)		37
Ivan	No; Nominations	Miglena, Zvezdelin	Miglena, Elena R.	Zvezdelin, Miglena	Miglena, Zvezdelin	Miglena, Zvezdelin	Zvezdelin, Miglena	Radomira, Zvezdelin	Elena R., Leonardo	Maya, Daniela	Leonardo, Elena R.	Leonardo, Daniela	Evicted (Day 89)		23
Irena	No; Nominations	Nedyalko, Ivan	Nedyalko, Ivan	Silvia D., Ivan	Miroslav, Elena G.	Miroslav, Ivan	Miroslav, Elena R.	Miroslav, Elena R.	Elena R., Miroslav	Daniela, Elena R.	Elena R., Daniela	Daniela, Leonardo	Evicted (Day 87)		21
Daniela	Not in House							Exempt	Marian, Elena R.	Zvezdelin, Irena	Elena R., Irena	Irena, Zvezdelin	Evicted (Day 85)		24
Elena R.	Not in House	Exempt	Nedyalko, Irena	Ivan, Irena	Irena, Ivan	Zvezdelin, Ivan	Zvezdelin, Stefan	Radomira, Zvezdelin	Zvezdelin, Stefan	Daniela, Zvezdelin	Daniela, Zvezdelin	Evicted (Day 78)			35
Maya	Not in House							Exempt	Elena R., Ivan	Ivan, Elena R.	Evicted (Day 71)				7
Marian	No; Nominations	Petko, Miglena	Nedyalko, Miglena	Zvezdelin, Miglena	Miroslav, Elena G.	Miroslav, Plamena	Miroslav	Miroslav, Radomira	Refused	Evicted (Day 64)					15
Radomira	No; Nominations	Miglena, Petko	Plamena, Miglena	Plamena, Miglena	Plamena, Miglena	Plamena, Miglena	Miglena, Elena R.	Elena R., Miroslav	Evicted (Day 57)						24
Miglena	No; Nominations	Petko, Irena	Irena, Plamena	Silvia D., Irena	Marian, Zvezdelin	Zvezdelin, Marian	Radomira, Miroslav	Evicted (Day 50)							34
Plamena	No; Nominations	Silvia D., Elena G.	Silvia D., Radomira	Silvia D., Radomira	Miroslav, Elena G.	Miroslav, Elena R.	Evicted (Day 43)								19
Elena G.	No; Nominations	Plamena, Miglena	Nedyalko, Zvezdelin	Zvezdelin, Miglena	Zvezdelin, Irena	Evicted (Day 37)									9
Silvia D.	No; Nominations	Petko, Plamena	Nedyalko, Zvezdelin	Miglena, Zvezdelin	Evicted (Day 29)										21
Nedyalko	No; Nominations	~~Silvia D.,~~; ~~Plamena~~	Silvia D., Elena R.	Evicted (Day 22)											12
Petko	No; Nominations	Miroslav, Zvezdelin	Evicted (Day 15)												7
Radoslav	No; Nominations	Walked (Day 8)													N/A
Silva B.	No; Nominations	Walked (Day 8)													N/A
Notes	none	1	none						2, 3	none			4		
Against public vote	none	Miglena, Nedyalko, Petko	Nedyalko, Silvia D.	Silvia D., Zvezdelin	Elena G., Miglena, Miroslav	Miroslav, Plamena, Zvezdelin	Miglena, Miroslav	Miroslav, Radomira	Irena, Leonardo, Marian, Zvezdelin	Daniela, Maya	Daniela, Elena R.	Daniela, Leonardo	All remaining housemates		
Walked	Silva B., Radoslav	none													
Evicted	none	Petko; 62% to evict	Nedyalko; 65% to evict	Silvia D. 74% to evict	Elena G. 86% to evict	Plamena; 53% to evict	Miglena; 52% to evict	Radomira; 68% to evict	Marian; 85% to evict	Maya; 51% to evict	Elena R. 76% to evict	Daniela; 71% to evict	Irena; Fewest votes (out of 6)	Ivan; Fewest votes (out of 5)	
Evicted	none	Petko; 62% to evict	Nedyalko; 65% to evict	Silvia D. 74% to evict	Elena G. 86% to evict	Plamena; 53% to evict	Miglena; 52% to evict	Radomira; 68% to evict	Marian; 85% to evict	Maya; 51% to evict	Elena R. 76% to evict	Daniela; 71% to evict	Zvezdelin; Fewest votes (out of 4)	Stefan; Fewest votes (out of 3)	
Evicted	none	Petko; 62% to evict	Nedyalko; 65% to evict	Silvia D. 74% to evict	Elena G. 86% to evict	Plamena; 53% to evict	Miglena; 52% to evict	Radomira; 68% to evict	Marian; 85% to evict	Maya; 51% to evict	Elena R. 76% to evict	Daniela; 71% to evict	Leonardo; 48% (out of 2)	Miroslav; 52% to win	

=== Notes ===
- ^Note 1: Nedyalko's nominations were declared void as he had been discussing nominations. As punishment Nedyalko was nominated by Big Brother.
- ^Note 2: Marian was nominated by Big Brother because he refused to nominate two of his housemates.
- ^Note 3: Big Brother had previously told Leonardo that he would automatically be up for eviction unless he received the most nominations, as the person with the highest number of nomination points would be immune from eviction. Leonardo failed his secret mission.
^Note 4 There were no nominations in the final week. The public voted for who they want to win, rather than evict. On Day 87, Irena was evicted with the fewest votes to win at that point. On Day 89, Ivan was evicted with the fewest votes to win at that point.
