= Nova – Center for Social Innovation =

Progressive think tank

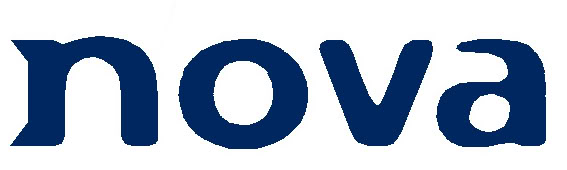

The Nova Center for Social Innovation is an organization that aims to promote social innovation to help generate alternative socioeconomic models to globalization. The center's objectives also include creating a culture of peace and a more sustainable and participatory society.

Nova works with organizations and institutions interested in starting projects that promote social innovation, and provides services that help citizens become actively involved in these processes.

The Nova association was founded in 2000. Prior to then, the team behind the center took part in the Centre d'Estudis Joan Bardina (1983–1991) and EcoConcern (1992–1999), where it organized the Catalan Forum for Rethinking Society (1996–2001) within the framework of the Alliance for a responsible, plural and united world (1995–2001). Since 2003, Nova has been a member of Nonviolent Peaceforce, and through its 'NoViolenciaActiva' Team (known as "Forces de Pau Noviolentes" until 2006) it promotes activities on the culture of peace and nonviolence, attempting to implement systems of nonviolent intervention and civilian resistance in conflict areas.

Since 2008, Nova has worked on the project Barcelona Consensus: Intercultural Alternatives to Neo-liberal Globalization.
