= Radio Nova =

Radio Nova may refer to:

- Radio Nova (Sofia), 101.7 FM Sofia, Bulgaria
- Radio Nova (Finland)
- Radio Nova (France)
- Radio Nova (Ireland), a pirate radio station operated in 80s
- Radio Nova 100FM (Ireland), a classic rock and roll station licensed for 100.3 FM in Dublin
- Radio Nova (Norway), 99.3 FM Oslo
- Rádio Nova (Portugal), a radio station where Luís Miguel Loureiro started his career

== See also ==
- Nova (radio network), a network of radio stations in Australia
  - Nova 96.9 (2SYD), Sydney
  - Nova 100 (3MEL), Melbourne
  - Nova 106.9 (4BNE), Brisbane
  - Nova 91.9 (5ADL), Adelaide
  - Nova 93.7 (6PER), Perth
- Nova M Radio, an American radio network
- NovaSport FM, a Greek sports radio station featuring music by Christos Dantis
- Radio (disambiguation)
- Nova (disambiguation)
