= Big Brother 1 (Bulgarian season) =

- Season 1
- Presented by: Niki Kanchev; Evelina Pavlova
- No. of days: 92
- No. of housemates: 15
- Winner: Zdravko Vasilev
- Runner-up: Svetlozara Trendafilova

Release
- Original network: Nova Television
- Original release: 18 October 2004 – 17 January 2005

Season chronology
- Next → Season 2

Big Brother 1 was the first season of the Bulgarian version of Big Brother and the first reality show in Bulgaria. The show was aired on Nova Television. The show started on 18 October 2004 and ended on 17 January 2005, and it was hosted by Niki Kanchev and Evelina Pavlova. The winner was Zdravko, who won 200,000 leva. He also participated in the second season of VIP Brother - the season was won by his wife.

== Housemates ==
12 Housemates entered the House on Day 1, and another 1 on Day 18. Veneta and Zeyneb entered on Day 50.

Name	Age	Occupation	Residence	Day entered	Day exited	Status
Zdravko Vasilev	27	Unknown	Primorsko	1	92	Winner
Svetlozara Trendafilova "Zara"	19	Model	Varna	1	92	Runner-up
Viktor Zhechkov	27	Dentist	Sliven	1	92	Third Place
Alidzhan Aliev	31	Computer specialist	Sofia	1	85	Evicted
Zeyneb Madzhurova	19	Student	Burgas	50	78	Evicted
Tihomir Georgiev	31	Businessman	Sofia	18	71	Evicted
Veneta Mileva-Ilieva	36	Beautician	Kostinbrod	50	58	Evicted
Mariela Kiselkova "Mel"	23	Graphic designer	Sofia/Veliko Tarnovo	1	57	Evicted
Nayden Naydenov	24	Computer club operator	Sofia	1	48	Ejected
Svetlan Shevrov "Groshi"	32	Carpenter	Kostandovo	1	48	Ejected
Stoyka Stefanova	25	Unemployed	Plovdiv	1	43	Evicted
Margarita Grigorova	38	Undergraduate	Kyustendil	1	36	Evicted
Silvia-Aleksandra Docheva	25	Student	Lovech	1	29	Evicted
Anelia Ivanova	31	Housewife	Sofia/Ruse	1	22	Evicted
Dimitar Kazalov	40	Unknown	Sofia/London	1	17	Evicted

=== Alidzhan ===
Alidzhan Aliev is from Sofia. He entered the house on Day 1 and was the eighth evicted on Day 85.

=== Anelia ===
Anelia Ivanova is from Sofia (born in Ruse). She entered the house on Day 1 and was the first evicted on Day 22. Disappointed with her participation, Anelia returned to Italy, where she lived before the show.

=== Dimitar ===
Dimitar Kazalov is from Sofia (lives in London). He entered the house on Day 1 and left voluntarily on Day 17.

=== Margarita ===
Margarita Grigorova is from Kyustendil. She entered the house on Day 1 and was the third evicted on Day 36.

=== Mariela ===
Mariela Kiselkova "Mel" is from Sofia (born in Veliko Tarnovo). She entered the house on Day 1 and was the fifth evicted on Day 57. She had a brief lesbian romance with her roommate Svetlozara and had sex with her.

=== Nayden ===
Nayden Naydenov is from Sofia. He entered the house on Day 1, but was ejected on Day 48 along with Svetlan for aggressive behavior. After an incident in which they both started vandalism (breaking things in the house), the nominations were cancelled and there were open special telephone lines - the viewers had to decide whether they should be punished. They had four choices - to eject Nayden, to eject Svetlan, to eject both of them, or both of them simply to stay in the house. Nayden celebrated his 25th birthday in the house - there was a party in which Zara came out of a big cake. They had sex the same night.

=== Silvia-Aleksandra ===
Silvia-Aleksandra Docheva is from Lovech. She entered the house on Day 1 and was the second evicted on Day 29.

=== Stoyka ===
Stoyka Stefanova is from Plovdiv. She entered the house on Day 1 and was the fourth evicted on Day 43.

=== Svetlan ===
Svetlan Shevrov "Groshi" is from Kostandovo. He entered the house on Day 1, but was ejected along with Nayden on Day 48.

=== Svetlozara ===
Svetlozara Trendafilova "Zara" is from Varna. She entered the house on Day 1 and finished second in the finale on Day 92. She had a brief lesbian romance and sexual encounter with her roommate Mariela.

=== Tihomir ===
Tihomir Georgiev is from Sofia. He entered the house on Day 18, after Dimitar's voluntary leave. He was the sixth evicted on Day 71. After he left the house, he met and later married the famous TV host Veneta Raykova. On 26 March 2007 they both entered the house as participants in VIP Brother 2.

=== Veneta ===
Veneta Mileva-Ilieva is from Kostinbrod. She entered the house on Day 50, along with Zeyneb. Veneta left the house voluntarily on Day 58. After her participation in the show, she gave birth to her third child.

=== Viktor ===
Viktor Zhechkov is from Sliven. He entered the house on Day 1 and finished third in the finale on Day 92. Viktor was the only housemate not to be nominated for eviction (never faced the public vote) during the whole season.

=== Zdravko ===
Zdravko Vasilev is from Primorsko. He entered the house on Day 1 and became a winner on Day 92. An interesting fact is that his girlfriend Hristina contacted him during his stay in the house to tell him she was pregnant. On 26 March 2007 Zdravko entered the house again, this time as a participant in VIP Brother 2. Before entering, he proposed marriage to Hristina. On Day 5, she entered the house, too with their daughter. The couple married in the house. Surprisingly, Hristina was the winner of VIP Brother 2.

=== Zeyneb ===
Zeyneb Madzhurova is from Burgas. She entered the house on Day 50 along with Veneta, after Nayden and Svetlan's ejections. She was the seventh evicted on Day 78.

== Weekly summary and highlights ==
Week 1	Tasks	Save the fire - the housemates had to save the fire in the garden for 72 hours. The task was successful.
Week 2	Tasks	In the army - the housemates were put into military conditions - to wear army clothes, to separate into two armies... The task was unsuccessful
Week 3	Up for eviction	Dimitar and Anelia (after Dimitar walked the nominees became four - Anelia, Silvia-Aleksandra, Stoyka, Mariela)
Week 3	Entrances	Tihomir entered the house on Day 18
Week 3	Tasks	Get to know your buddy - the housemates had to gather as much information about the other as they could.
Week 3	Exits	Dimitar walked on Day 17
Week 4	Up for eviction	Silvia-Aleksandra and Zdravko
Week 4	Tasks	Diet - the housemates were divided into two groups - the first one had to lose weight, the second - to raise
Week 4	Exits	Anelia was evicted on Day 22
Week 5	Up for eviction	Margarita, Stoyka and Zdravko
Week 5	Tasks	Stageplay - the housemates had to make up their own play. The special jury - the three housemates outside the house (Dimitar, Anelia and Silvia-Aleksandra) decided it was unsuccessful. The housemates lost 100% of their budget for the next week.
Week 5	Exits	Silvia-Aleksandra was evicted on Day 29
Week 6	Up for eviction	Stoyka and Zdravko
Week 6	Tasks	A pet - the housemates were given the dog Rufus. They had to take care of him and teach him different tricks.
Week 6	Exits	Margarita was evicted on Day 36
Week 7	Up for eviction	Alidzhan and Zdravko (the nominations were cancelled after Svetlan and Nayden's ejection)
Week 7	Tasks	In chains - the housemates were in chains with each other (in couples). They had to be together everywhere and all the time. The task was unsuccessful - Nayden and Svetlan broke the rules.
Week 7	Birthdays	Nayden celebrated his 25th birthday on 30 November. There was a party in the house in which Svetlozara came out of a big cake. They had sex the same night.
Week 7	Exits	Stoyka was evicted on Day 43; Svetlan and Nayden were ejected on Day 48 for breaking the rules
Week 8	Up for eviction	Alidjan, Zdravko, Mariela and Tihomir
Week 8	Entrances	Veneta and Zeyneb entered the house on Day 50
Week 8	Tasks	Rich, poor - the housemates were divided into rich and poor
Week 9	Up for eviction	There were no nominations because of Veneta's leaving
Week 9	Tasks	Good parents - the housemates were divided into couples, and they were given baby dolls. They had to look after them as their own children.
Week 9	Exits	Mariela was evicted on Day 57; Veneta walked on Day 58
Week 10	Up for eviction	Tihomir and Zeyneb
Week 10	Tasks	Help Santa Claus - the housemates had to run 1208 miles (the distance between Lapland and Helsinki) on a running path in order their relatives to be given Christmas presents. The task was successful.
Week 11	Up for eviction	Svetlozara and Zeyneb
Week 11	Tasks	Dirty trick - the housemates had to do bad tricks to each other.
Week 11	Exits	Tihomir was evicted on Day 71
Week 12	Up for eviction	Svetlozara and Alidzhan
Week 12	Tasks	Skaters
Week 12	Exits	Zeyneb was evicted on Day 78
Week 13	Up for eviction	No nominations. The positive voting started
Week 13	Tasks	This week there were only day tasks in order to entertain the housemates during their final days in the house
Week 13	Exits	Alidzhan was evicted on Day 85
Week 13	Final; Day 92	Viktor finished in third place, Svetlozara - second and Zdravko left the house as the winner of Big Brother 1

== Nominations table ==
	Week 3	Week 4	Week 5	Week 6	Week 7	Week 8	Week 9	Week 10	Week 11	Week 12	Final		Nominations received
Zdravko	Mariela, Dimitar	Stoyka, Mariela	Tihomir, Stoyka	Nayden, Stoyka	Nayden, Mariela	Mariela, Tihomir	No; Nominations	Tihomir, Zeyneb	Svetlozara, Zeyneb	Svetlozara, Alidzhan	Winner (Day 92)		27
Svetlozara	Dimiar, Silvia-Aleksandra	Zdravko, Silvia-Aleksandra	Zdravko, Margarita	Zdravko, Alidzhan	Alidzhan, Zdravko	Alidzhan, Zdravko	No; Nominations	Zeyneb, Viktor	Zdravko, Zeyneb	Alidzhan, Zdravko	Runner-up (Day 92)		9
Viktor	Dimitar, Anelia	Svetlozara, Zdravko	Svetlan, Alidzhan	Nayden, Stoyka	Nayden, Tihomir	Tihomir, Mariela	No; Nominations	Tihomir, Zeyneb	Svetlozara, Zeyneb	Alidzhan, Svetlozara	Third place (Day 92)		5
Alidzhan	Dimitar, Anelia	Silvia-Aleksandra, Zdravko	Tihomir, Mariela	Nayden, Stoyka	Mariela, Nayden	Tihomir, Mariela	No; Nominations	Tihomir, Zeyneb	Svetlozara, Zeyneb	Svetlozara, Zdravko	Evicted (Day 85)		20
Zeyneb	Not in House					Exempt	No; Nominations	Alidzhan, Tihomir	Alidzhan, Svetlozara	Evicted (Day 78)			8
Tihomir	Not in House	Exempt	Margarita, Stoyka	Zdravko, Viktor	Zdravko, Alidzhan	Zdravko, Alidzhan	No; Nominations	Alidzhan, Zdravko	Evicted (Day 71)				10
Veneta	Not in House					Exempt	Walked (Day 58)						0
Mariela	Zdravko, Anelia	Zdravko, Silvia-Aleksandra	Margarita, Zdravko	Zdravko, Alidzhan	Zdravko, Alidzhan	Alidzhan, Zdravko	Evicted (Day 57)						13
Nayden	Anelia, Dimitar	Silvia-Aleksandra, Mariela	Mariela, Stoyka	Stoyka, Viktor	Viktor, Mariela	Ejected (Day 48)							8
Svetlan	Dimitar, Stoyka	Zdravko, Stoyka	Zdravko, Stoyka	Zdravko, Stoyka	Alidzhan, Zdravko	Ejected (Day 48)							2
Stoyka	Anelia, Silvia-Aleksandra	Silvia-Aleksandra, Zdravko	Zdravko, Margarita	Alidzhan, Zdravko	Evicted (Day 43)								15
Margarita	Viktor, Stoyka	Stoyka, Alidzhan	Mariela, Stoyka	Evicted (Day 36)									4
Silvia-Aleksandra	Svetlozara, Mariela	Alidzhan, Svetlan	Evicted (Day 29)										7
Anelia	Dimitar, Nayden	Evicted (Day 22)											5
Dimitar	~~Alidzhan,~~; ~~Nayden~~	Walked (Day 17)											7
Nomination notes	1	2	none		3	4	5	none			6		
Against public vote	Anelia, Mariela, Silvia-Aleksandra, Stoyka	Silvia-Aleksandra, Zdravko	Margarita, Stoyka, Zdravko	Stoyka, Zdravko	Alidzhan, Zdravko	Alidzhan, Mariela, Tihomir, Zdravko	none	Tihomir, Zeyneb	Svetlozara, Zeyneb	Alidzhan, Svetlozara	All; Housemates		
Walked	Dimitar	none					Veneta	none					
Ejected	none				Svetlan, Nayden	none							
Evicted	Anelia; Most votes to evict	Silvia-Aleksandra; Most votes to evict	Margarita; Most votes to evict	Stoyka; Most votes to evict	Eviction; Cancelled	Mariela; Most votes to evict	Eviction; Cancelled	Tihomir; Most votes to evict	Zeyneb; Most votes to evict	Alidzhan; Most votes to evict	Viktor; 10% (out of 3)	Svetlozara; 46% (out of 2)	
Evicted	Anelia; Most votes to evict	Silvia-Aleksandra; Most votes to evict	Margarita; Most votes to evict	Stoyka; Most votes to evict	Eviction; Cancelled	Mariela; Most votes to evict	Eviction; Cancelled	Tihomir; Most votes to evict	Zeyneb; Most votes to evict	Alidzhan; Most votes to evict	Zdravko; 54% to win		

=== Notes ===
- ^Note 1: Initially, Dimitar and Anelia faced the public vote. However, after Dimitar walked, his nominations were voided meaning Mariela, Silvia-Aleksandra and Stoyka would also face the public vote with Anelia.
- ^Note 2: As a new Housemate, Tihomir was exempt from the nominations process this week.
- ^Note 3: Week 7's eviction was cancelled after the public voted to allow Big Brother to eject both Nayden & Svetlan as punishment for aggressive behavior and vandalizing the house.
- ^Note 4: As new Housemates, Veneta and Zeyneb were exempt from the nominations process this week.
- ^Note 5: As Veneta walked prior to nominations, nominations and the planned eviction for Week 9 were cancelled.
- ^Note 6: For the final week, the public were voting for a winner.
