= Novae (disambiguation) =

Novae are cataclysmic nuclear explosions in white dwarf stars.

Novae may also refer to:

- Novae (fortress), Bulgaria
- Novae Group, insurance underwriting company
- "Novae", from drone metal band Sunn O's album Life Metal
