= Novi =

Novi may refer to:

== Places and jurisdictions ==
=== Balkans ===
- Novi Grad, Bosnia and Herzegovina
- Novi (medieval Herceg Novi), original name for Herceg Novi, Montenegro
- Diocese of Novi, a Catholic see at medieval Herceg Novi, now titular
- Novi Vinodolski, a town in Croatia
- Lički Novi, a village near Gospić, Croatia

=== Italy ===
- Novi di Modena, a comune in the province of Modena
- Novi Ligure, a town north of Genoa
- Novi Velia, a comune in the province of Salerno

=== United States ===
- Novi, Michigan, a city in Oakland County
- Novi Township, Michigan, the remnant of the unincorporated township now entirely within the city of Novi

== Other uses ==
- Novi engine, American auto racing engine named after Novi, Michigan
- Novi wallet, a digital wallet for Diem, a digital currency
- NOVI Hogeschool, a Dutch university of applied sciences
