= Novus =

Novus (Latin, 'new') may refer to:

== Businesses and organizations ==
- Novus Biologicals, later Bio-Techne, an American biotech company
- Novus Entertainment, a Canadian telecommunications company
- Novus International, an animal health and nutrition company
- Novus Group International, a Swedish polling company
- Novus Leisure, a British company owning bars and nightclubs
- Novus Records, an American jazz record label
- Novus, a credit card transaction clearance system used by Discover Card
- Novus, an IT company

== Other uses ==
- Tata Novus, a truck
- Novus, a fictional planet in Stargate Universe season 2
- Novus, a fictional race in the video game Universe at War: Earth Assault
- "Novus", a song by Santana from the 2002 album Shaman
- Novus (Durham), a skyscraper in Durham, North Carolina

== See also ==
- Novuss, a game of physical skill
