= Miss Grand Bulgaria =

Beauty pageant in Bulgaria

- Formation: 2015
- Type: Beauty pageant
- Headquarters: Sofia
- Location: Bulgaria
- Members: Miss Grand International
- Official language: Bulgarian
- National director: Veneta Krasteva
- Parent organization: Bok Star Models (2015, 2017 – 2020)

Miss Grand Bulgaria is a national beauty pageant title awarded to Bulgarian representatives competing at the Miss Grand International pageant. It was first introduced in 2013 when Miss Universe Bulgaria 2013, Veneta Krasteva, was invited to represent the country in the 2015 edition of Miss Grand International in Thailand. In 2017, Krasteva, as the manager of Bok Star Models, purchased the Miss Grand Bulgaria license; however, the license was later terminated in 2021.

Under the direction of Bok Star Models, the Bulgarian representatives were selected through their affiliated pageants, such as Miss World Bulgaria and Miss Sofia, except for 2020, when the titleholder was chosen via online processes.

== History ==
Bulgaria debuted in the Miss Grand International pageant in 2015, when Veneta Krasteva was invited to compete in such an edition, but she was unplaced. After no Bulgarian license holder in 2016, Krasteva as the chairperson of a Sofia-based modeling agency, Bok Star Models, bought the franchise the following year, and the 2017 Miss Grand Bulgaria titleholder was elected through the Miss Sofia contest, the regional contest of the Miss World Bulgaria, which the mentioned organizer also managed.

In 2018 and 2019, Miss Grand Bulgaria was awarded as the supplementary title in the Miss World Bulgaria contest, while the 2020 titleholders were elected through the online selection. Later in 2021, Bok Star Models ended its partnership with the Miss Grand International pageant, and, hitherto, the license of Miss Grand Bulgaria was not purchased by any other agents.

== International competition ==
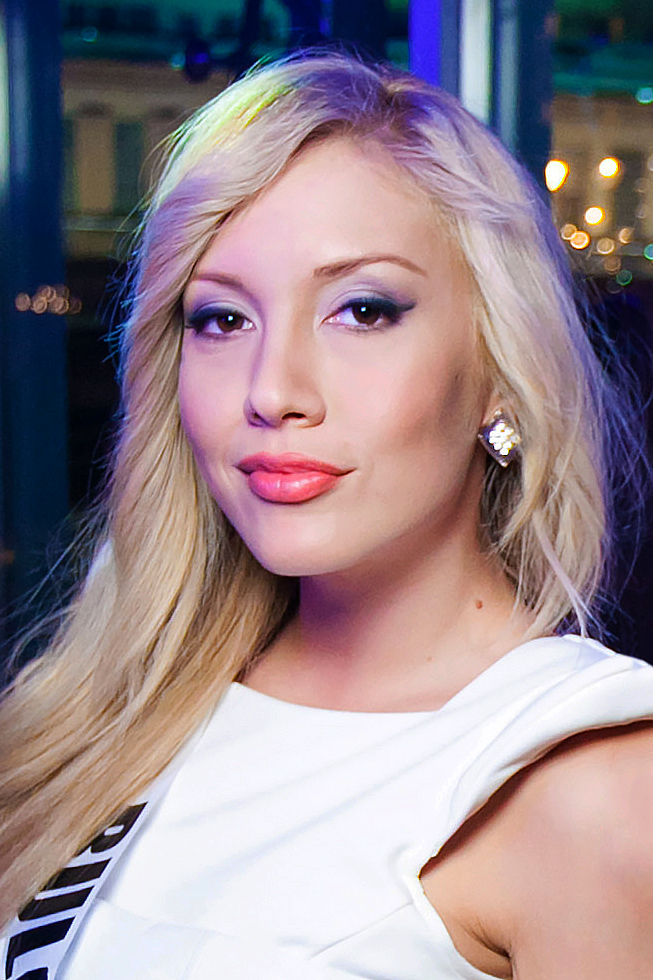
Veneta Krasteva, Miss Grand Bulgaria 2015

The following is a list of Bulgarian representatives at the Miss Grand International contest.

Year	Representative		Original national title	International result	
Year	English name	Bulgarian name	Original national title	Placement	Other awards
2013	Mirela Petrova	Мирела Петрова		Unable to compete	
2015	Veneta Krasteva	Венета Кръстева	Miss Universe Bulgaria 2013	Unplaced	—N/a
2017	Ralitsa Kandova	Ралица Кандова	Miss Grand Bulgaria 2017	Unplaced	
2018	Beloslava Yordanova	Белослава Йорданова	Miss Grand Bulgaria 2018	Unplaced	—N/a
2019	Victoria Vaseva	Виктория Васева	Miss Grand Bulgaria 2019	Unplaced	—N/a
2020	Viktoria Lazarova	Виктория Лазарова	Miss Sofia 2020	Unplaced	—N/a
No representatives since 2021
