= VIP Brother season 3 =

Third season of Bulgarian reality television show

VIP Brother
- Season 3
- Presented by: Niki Kanchev; Dimitar Rachkov; Maria Ignatova
- No. of days: 56
- No. of housemates: 17
- Winner: Deyan Slavchev "Deo"
- Runner-up: Maria Grozdeva

Release
- Original network: Nova Television
- Original release: 16 March – 10 May 2009

Season chronology
- ← Previous; Season 2 Next → Season 4

VIP Brother 3 was the third season of the celebrity version of the Bulgarian reality television show Big Brother. It was launched on Nova Television on 16 March 2009, and ended on 10 May 2009 with an eleven-hour season finale starting at 3:00 pm and finishing after 1:00 am.

This season was confirmed on 31 December 2008 by Niki Kanchev, who returned as a host. He announced that the season would start in March 2009. Later on the same day, Nova Television aired the first promo with the slogan Celebrities change destinies. The show is produced by Niko Tuparev (Old School Productions) again. All the money from SMS votes were donated to charity, and there was no cash prize for the winner. Also, this season was longer than the previous two. It lasted for 56 days (8 weeks), making it the longest VIP Brother season in Bulgaria so far.

Deyan Slavchev "Deo" was the winner.

== Production ==
=== Broadcast ===
The show was aired on Nova Television and Diema 2.

=== The new charity format ===
Unlike the previous two seasons, VIP Brother 3 featured 17 celebrity Housemates, who were not competing for a cash prize, but for charity causes. Each one of the 8 weeks was dedicated to a different cause, making the causes eight. During their stay in the House the Housemates had special tasks. Sometimes they were also gathering money outside the House. 13 Housemates entered the House on Day 1 and 4 more on Day 2.

=== The house ===
VIP Brother 3 was shot in the House in Novi khan, where the Housemates from Big Brother 4 lived. However, it was entirely redecorated. As in the previous two seasons, there were some similarities with Celebrity Big Brother UK – there were no cameras in the bathrooms and there was a big ashtray in the garden. For the first time, there was a washing machine in the House.

=== Big Brother's Big Mouth ===
The companion talk show Big Brother's Big Mouth returned during VIP Brother 3, and was hosted by the pop-folk singer Kamelia. The concept of the show this season was different. There were not "evil tongues". Kamelia was often entering the House, asking the Housemates different questions. The show was aired three times a week – on Mondays, Thursdays and Fridays. Previously the show was aired during Big Brother 3 and was hosted by Dim Dukov, contestant in VIP Brother 1.

== Housemates ==
The new VIP-Housemates were 17. All of them were competing for charity causes during their stay in the House. They were collecting money through the tasks given to them by Big Brother. A new guest celebrity Housemate was entering the House every week. He/she stayed in the House for one week, which made the celebrity Housemates in this season 25 in total.

13 Housemates entered the House on Day 1. They were joined by 4 other Housemates on Day 2.

Name	Age on entry	Notability	Hometown	Day entered	Day exited	Status
Deyan Slavchev "Deo"	33	TV presenter	Sofia	1	56	Winner
Maria Grozdeva	36	Athlete	Sofia	2	56	Runner-up
Todor Slavkov	38	Businessman	Sofia	1	56	3rd Place
Sofi Marinova	33	Singer	Etropole	1	56	4th Place
Itso Hazarta	29	Musician	Sofia	1	56	5th Place
Petya Dikova	24	Journalist	Sofia	1	56	6th Place
Ivayla Bakalova	27	Real estate	Varna	1	56	7th Place
Sasha Antunovich	34	Football player	Pristina	2	54	Evicted
Bozhidara Bakalova	27	Designer	Varna	1	46	Evicted
Milko Kalaidjiev	57	Singer	Svilengrad	1	39	Evicted
Anya Pencheva	51	Actress	Smolyan	1	38	Walked
Gala Peneva-Budeva	42	TV presenter	Pleven	1	32	Evicted
Emil Koshlukov	43	Political scientist; journalist	Pazardzhik	1	25	Walked
Ivan Dinev "Ustata"	31	Singer	Stara Zagora	2	25	Evicted
Kristiana Valcheva	50	Nurse	Sofia	1	18	Evicted
Antonia Petrova	24	Student; Miss Bulgaria 2009	Pazardzhik	2	16	Walked
Danail Ignatov "Dacho"	24	Driver	Altimir	1	11	Evicted

=== Antonia ===
Antonia Petrova is a Miss Bulgaria 2009. She entered the house on Day 2 and walked on Day 16.

=== Anya ===
Anya Pencheva is a famous actress and mother of Petya. She entered the house on Day 1. Anya got sick and she was hospitalized on Day 21. She returned to the house on Day 25. After the conflict with her fellow housemate Ivayla, Anya walked on Day 38.

=== Bozhidara ===
Bozhidara Bakalova is a fashion designer and twin-sister of Ivayla. She entered the house on Day 1 and was the sixth evicted on Day 47. Her brother Antony entered a year later in Big Brother Family with his wife Tsanka.

=== Dacho ===
Danail Ignatov "Dacho" is Sofia's boyfriend. He entered the house on Day 1 and was the first evicted on Day 11 after receiving the fewest positive votes. For the first time in the history of Big Brother Bulgaria, no one left the house voluntarily before the first eviction.

=== Deo ===
Deyan Slavchev "Deo" is a TV host and hip-hop singer. He entered the house on Day 1 and became a winner on Day 56.

=== Emil ===
Emil Koshlukov is a politician. He entered the house on Day 1, although he had some hesitations on the final moment because of Todor Slavkov's presence in the show. Emil walked on Day 25.

=== Gala ===
Gala Peneva-Budeva is one of the most famous female TV hosts. On 15 January 2009, it was officially announced that she will be the first housemate in VIP Brother 3. Gala announced that she had been invited to enter the house before, but she agreed now because of the new charity concept. During her participation, she hosted her daily talk show Na kafe. Her husband Stefan Nikolov entered nine years later in VIP Brother 10 in 2018. She entered the house on Day 1 and was the fourth evicted on Day 32.

=== Itso ===
Itso Hazarta (born Hristo Petrov) is best known as a rap singer in the band Upsurt. On 20 February it was revealed that he will be the second housemate to participate in VIP Brother 3. He entered the house on Day 1 and finished fifth in the finale on Day 56.

=== Ivayla ===
Ivayla Bakalova is a former Miss Bulgaria 2001 and twin-sister of Bozhidara. She entered the house on Day 1 and finished seventh in the finale on Day 56. Her brother Antony entered a year later in Big Brother Family with his wife Tsanka.

=== Kristiana ===
Kristiana Valcheva is one of the five Bulgarian nurses, who were given death sentences in the HIV Trial in Libya. She entered the house on Day 1 and was the second evicted on Day 18.

=== Maria ===
Maria Grozdeva is an Olympic shooting champion. She entered the house on Day 2 and finished second in the finale on Day 56.

=== Milko ===
Mihail "Milko" Kalaidjiev is a pop-folk singer. He entered the house on Day 1 and was the fifth evicted on Day 39.

=== Petya ===
Petya Dikova is an actress, TV host and daughter of Anya. She entered the house on Day 1 and finished sixth in the finale on Day 56.

=== Sasha ===
Sasha Antunovich (Serbian – Saša Antunović) is a Serbian football player, ex-Lokomotiv Sofia striker. He has scored 38 goals in Bulgarian A PFG, which is the second-best result for a foreign player. He entered the house on Day 2 and was the seventh evicted on Day 54.

=== Sofi ===
Sofi Marinova is a famous pop-folk singer. She entered the house on Day 1 and finished fourth in the finale on Day 56.

=== Todor ===
Todor Slavkov is a controversial personality and a businessman, apart from being related to two of the most prominent Bulgarian personalities. Todor is the grandson of Todor Zhivkov – the most famous Bulgarian communist, who was the leader of the People's Republic of Bulgaria from 4 March 1954 until 10 November 1989. Todor's father is Ivan Slavkov – a Bulgarian sports boss linked to the communist-era nomenklatura. He entered the house on Day 1 and finished third in the finale on Day 56.

=== Ustata ===
Ivan Dinev, aka Ustata is a rap singer. He entered the house on Day 2 and was the third evicted on Day 25.

== Houseguests ==
=== Andrey ===
Andrey Slabakov is a film director. He was one of the evil tongues in the show Big Brother's Big Mouth during Big Brother 3. His wife Ernestina Shinova entered six years later in VIP Brother 7 in 2015. He entered the house on Day 17 and left on Day 31.

=== Azis ===
Azis (born Vasil Boyanov) is one of the most popular pop-folk singers in Bulgaria. He was a participant in VIP Brother 2, where he spent 18 Days. He entered the VIP Brother 3 house on Day 10, where he spent five days. He is the only contestant to participate in two VIP Brother seasons so far.

=== Diana ===
Diana Lyubenova is an actress. She is best known for her role as Anastasiya Konstantinova in Nova Television's TV series Zabranena Lyubov (Forbidden Love). She entered the house on Day 38 and was supposed to stay for a week, but decided to leave 5 days later – on Day 50.

=== Georgi ===
Georgi Mamalev is an actor. He was supposed to enter the house on Day 2. However, due to his engagements in the theatre, he didn't participate in the show.

=== Kamelia ===
Kamelia Veskova is a famous pop-folk singer and the host of Big Brother's Big Mouth. She entered the house on Day 11 and left on Day 15.

=== Lyubomir ===
Lyubomir Ganev is a volleyball player. He entered the house on Day 31 and stayed for a week.

=== Preslava ===
Preslava (born Petya Ivanova) is a famous pop-folk singer. She entered the house on Day 45 and she was the last celebrity guest housemate in VIP Brother 3. It was announced that she did not receive any money for her stay in the show. Six years later in 2015 entered as a participant (later as a guest participant) in VIP Brother 7. She left the House on Day 52.

=== Rumen ===
Rumen Lukanov is the host of Deal or No Deal. He entered the house on Day 2 and left on Day 10.

=== Teodora ===
Teodora Stefanova is Silvio Berlusconi's personal astrologist. She entered the house on Day 24 and stayed for a week. She left the house on Day 31.

== Nominations table ==
This season the nominations and the viewers' votes were both positive.

	Week 2	Week 3	Week 4	Week 5	Week 6	Week 7	Week 8	Final		Nominations received
Deo	Sasha	Not eligible	Anya, Gala, Itso, Maria, Sofi, Ustata	Not eligible	Nominated	Nominated	Nominated	Winner (Day 56)		5
Maria	Not eligible	Nominated	Nominated	Not eligible	Nominated	Not eligible	Nominated	Runner-up (Day 56)		6
Todor	Milko	Not eligible	Not eligible	Nominated	Not eligible	Nominated	Nominated	Third place (Day 56)		4
Sofi	Emil, Sasha, Todor	Nominated	Nominated	Nominated	Nominated	Nominated	Nominated	Fourth place (Day 56)		9
Itso	Emil	Not eligible	Nominated	Nominated	Nominated	Nominated	Nominated	Fifth place (Day 56)		8
Petya	Not eligible	Nominated	Not eligible	Not eligible	Not eligible	Nominated	Nominated	Sixth place (Day 56)		5
Ivayla	Not eligible	Not eligible	Not eligible	Nominated	Nominated	Bozhidara, Deo, Itso, Petya, Sofi	Exempt	Seventh place (Day 56)		4
Sasha	Dacho	Anya, Gala, Kristiana, Petya	Not eligible	Not eligible	Nominated	Not eligible	Nominated	Evicted (Day 54)		6
Bozhidara	Not eligible	Not eligible	Not eligible	Anya, Gala, Itso, Ivayla, Milko	Not eligible	Nominated	Evicted (Day 46)			2
Milko	Dacho	Not eligible	Not eligible	Nominated	Nominated	Evicted (Day 39)				5
Anya	Not eligible	Nominated	Nominated	Nominated	Deo, Ivayla, Maria, Milko, Sasha, Sofi	Walked (Day 38)				6
Gala	Not eligible	Nominated	Nominated	Nominated	Evicted (Day 32)					6
Emil	Dacho	Not eligible	Nominated	Walked (Day 25)						4
Ustata	Emil	Not eligible	Nominated	Evicted (Day 25)						2
Kristiana	Nominated	Nominated	Evicted (Day 18)							3
Antonia	Not eligible	Walked (Day 16)								0
Dacho	Sasha	Evicted (Day 11)								3
Houseguests
Rumen	Kristiana	Left (Day 10)								N/A
Azis	Not in House	Sofi	Left (Day 15)							N/A
Kamelia	Not in House	Maria	Left (Day 15)							N/A
Andrey	Not in House		Emil	Todor	Left (Day 31)					N/A
Teodora	Not in House			Sofi	Left (Day 31)					N/A
Lyubomir	Not in House				Itso	Left (Day 38)				N/A
Diana	Not in House					Todor	Not eligible	Left (Day 50)		N/A
Preslava	Not in House						Not eligible	Left (Day 52)		N/A
Notes	1	2	3	4	5	6	7	none		
Against public vote	Dacho, Emil, Kristiana, Sasha, Todor	Anya, Gala, Kristiana, Maria, Petya, Sofi	Anya, ~~Emil~~, Gala, Itso, Ustata, Maria, Sofi	Anya, Gala, Itso, Ivayla, Milko, Sofi, Todor	Deo, Itso, Maria, Milko, Sasha, Sofi	Bozhidara, Deo, Itso, Petya, Sofi, Todor	Deo, Itso, Maria, Petya, Sasha, Sofi, Todor	All; Housemates		
Walked	none	Antonia	Emil	none	Anya	none				
Evicted	Dacho; Fewest votes to save	Kristiana; Fewest votes to save	Ustata; Fewest votes to save	Gala; 22.17% to save	Milko; 22.68% to save	Bozhidara; 6.93% to save	Sasha; Fewest votes to save	Ivayla; Fewest votes (out of 7)	Petya; Fewest votes (out of 6)	
Evicted	Dacho; Fewest votes to save	Kristiana; Fewest votes to save	Ustata; Fewest votes to save	Gala; 22.17% to save	Milko; 22.68% to save	Bozhidara; 6.93% to save	Sasha; Fewest votes to save	Itso; Fewest votes (out of 5)	Sofi; Fewest votes (out of 4)	
Evicted	Dacho; Fewest votes to save	Kristiana; Fewest votes to save	Ustata; Fewest votes to save	Gala; 22.17% to save	Milko; 22.68% to save	Bozhidara; 6.93% to save	Sasha; Fewest votes to save	Todor; Fewest votes (out of 3)	Maria; Fewest votes (out of 2)	
Evicted	Dacho; Fewest votes to save	Kristiana; Fewest votes to save	Ustata; Fewest votes to save	Gala; 22.17% to save	Milko; 22.68% to save	Bozhidara; 6.93% to save	Sasha; Fewest votes to save	Deo; Most votes to win		

=== Notes ===
- ^Note 1: Male Housemates nominated Dacho. Emil, Sasha and Todor were not saved from nominations by Sofi. Kristiana was nominated by the celebrity guest Housemate Rumen. Dacho, Emil, Kristiana, Sasha and Todor faced the public vote. On Wednesday, Sasha and Todor received the most votes and they were saved. On Thursday Dacho, Emil and Kristiana faced the public vote. Dacho received the fewest positive votes and he was evicted.
- ^Note 2: Sofi was nominated by the celebrity guest Housemate Azis, and Maria was nominated by the other guest Kamelia. Anya, Gala, Kristiana and Petya were not saved from nominations by Sasha, who won the special battle games between the Housemates. Gala, Maria and Petya were saved on Wednesday and Anya, Kristiana and Sofi faced the public vote on Thursday.
- ^Note 3: Emil was nominated by the celebrity guest Housemate Andrey. Anya, Gala, Itso, Maria, Sofi and Ustata were not saved from nominations by Deo, who won the special battle games between the Housemates. Anya, Deo and Sofi had to choose which nominee to be saved from nominations, and they saved Anya. On Day 24 Emil, Itso and Sofi were saved. On Day 25 Gala, Maria and Ustata faced the public vote.
- ^Note 4: Bozhidara won the week battle. She didn't save from nominations Anya, Gala, Itso, Ivayla and Milko. Andrey and Ivayla saved Itso from nominations. Sofi was nominated by the celebrity guest Housemate Teodora, and Todor was nominated by Andrey. Anya, Sofi and Todor were saved on Wednesday. Gala, Ivayla and Milko faced the public vote on Thursday.
- ^Note 5: Itso was nominated by the celebrity guest Housemate Lyubomir. Anya won the week battle and she didn't save from nominations Deo, Ivayla, Maria, Milko, Sasha and Sofi. Deo, Itso and Sasha saved Sofi from nominations. Ivayla faced the public vote on Wednesday when competing with Anya. Ivayla was no longer nominated with the other 5 Housemates. Anya walked voluntarily.
- ^Note 6: Ivayla won the week games. Bozhidara, Deo, Itso, Petya and Sofi were not saved from her. Todor was nominated by the celebrity guest Housemate Diana.
- ^Note 7: Ivayla won the week games again. She was immune from nominations and is the first finalist for the VIP Brother 3 finale on 10 May. The other seven Housemates – Deo, Itso, Maria, Petya, Sasha, Sofi and Todor were up for eviction. Deo was saved on Monday and is the second finalist. Maria, Sasha and Todor received the fewest SMS votes, and one of them will be evicted on Thursday.

== Relationship between Anya and Ivayla ==
During the show, the relationship between Anya and Ivayla fell apart. Anya asked to leave the House voluntarily on Day 36. However, she asked the producers to open two phone lines – one for her and one for Ivayla, and the viewers had to decide which one of them to be evicted on Day 38. During the special eviction night the two reconciled and asked Big Brother to close the phone lines. The two returned into the House together. However, only a few minutes later they had a new disagreement over the voting results, announced by the producers – 51.7% for Ivayla and 48.3% for Anya. Anya walked out voluntarily the same night. All the money from viewers' SMS votes were given for the week's charity cause.

== Ratings ==
The launch of VIP Brother 3 was watched by nearly 1 600 000 viewers, beating bTV's Music Idol.
