= Miss Bulgaria =

Beauty contest

Miss Bulgaria Мис България
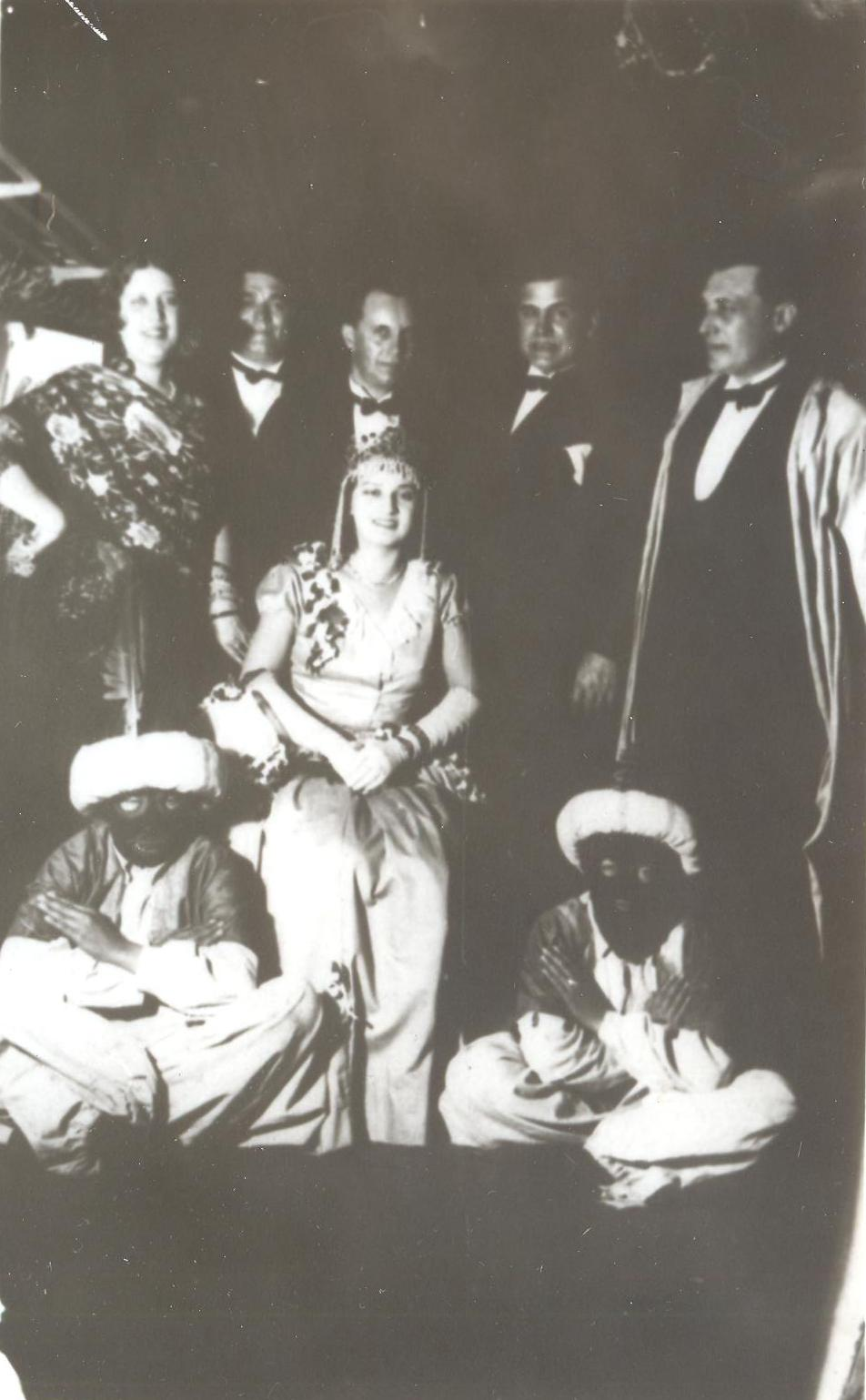
- Miss Bulgaria 1929 ceremony
- Formation: 1990
- Type: Beauty pageant
- Headquarters: Sofia
- Location: Bulgaria
- Official language: Bulgarian
- Agency: Intersound
- Website: Official site

Miss Bulgaria (Bulgarian: Мис България, Mis Balgariya) is a national beauty pageant in Bulgaria.

== History ==
Miss Bulgaria is national beauty contest re-established in 1990. At the moment the license for the contest is property of Fashion and Model Agency "Intersound".

== Titleholders ==
- 1990: Violeta Galabova
- 1991: Lyubomira Slavcheva
- 1992: Elena Draganova
- 1992: Neli Nenova (Neli Peycheva, Agency „Miss, Mrs & Mr“)
- 1993: Vyara Rusinova
- 1994: Stela Ognyanova
- 1995: Evgenia Kalkandzhieva - Top 10 Semi-Finalist Miss World 1995
- 1996: Vyara Kamenova (SOFIA)
- 1997: Elka Ivanova Traikova (SLIVNITSA)
- 1998: Nataliya Gurkova (BANSKO)
- 1999: Elena Angelova (SOFIA)
- 2001: Таня Карабелова
- 2002: Teodora Burgazlieva
- 2003: Iva Titova
- 2004: Gergana Guncheva
- 2005: Rositsa Ivanova
- 2006: Slavena Vatova
- 2007: Julia Yurevich
- 2009: Antonia Petrova
- 2010: Romina Andonova
- 2011: Vanya Peneva
- 2012: Gabriela Vasileva
- 2013: Nansi Karaboycheva (Pazardzhik)
- 2014: Simona Evgenieva (Montana)
- 2015: Marina Voykova (Elin Pelin)
- 2016: Gabriela Kirova (Varna)
- 2017: Tamara Georgieva (Sofia)
- 2018: Teodora Mudeva (Burgas)
- 2019: Radinela Chusheva (Plovdiv)
- 2020: Ventsislava Tafkova
- 2021: Sara Mladenova (Sofia)
- 2022: Alexandra Krasteva (Sofia)
- 2023: Elizabeth Kravets (Varna)

== Bulgarian representatives at Miss International ==
Year	Province	Miss International Bulgaria	Bulgarian Name	Placement at Miss International	Special Award(s)
Did not compete since 2025
2024	Provadia	Kristiyana Yordanova	Кристияна Йорданова	Unplaced	
Did not compete between 1970 and 2023
1970	Sofia	Branimira Antonova	Бранимира Антонова	Unplaced	

== See also ==
- Miss World Bulgaria
- Miss Universe Bulgaria
