= Todor Slavkov =

Bulgarian businessman (1971–2025)

- Undated photo of Slavkov
- Born: May 18, 1971; Sofia, People's Republic of Bulgaria
- Died: July 21, 2025 (aged 54); Stara Zagora, Bulgaria
- Occupation: Businessman
- Known for: Rape trail and subsequent acquittal and winner of reality tv show Big Brother (Bulgarian TV series)
- Parent(s): Ivan Slavkov and Lyudmila Zhivkova
- Relatives: Todor Zhivkov (Grandfather)

Todor Ivanov Slavkov (Bulgarian: Тодор Иванов Славков; 18 May 1971 – 21 July 2025) was a Bulgarian businessman.

== Early life ==
Slakov was born on 18 May 1971 in Sofia to sportsman Ivan Slavkov and politician Lyudmila Zhivkova. His mother was the daughter of former Prime Minister and first lady Todor Zhivkov and Mara Maleeva-Zhivkova. He graduated from the First English Language School in 1989 and was then sent to Switzerland, where he went on to graduate in business management at the University of St. Gallen.

== Celebrity ==
In the spring of 2009, he took part in the charity edition of the reality show Big Brother. He finished in third place after the viewers' vote. In 2012, Slavkov was the main character in the TV7 reality show "X Millionaire Looking for a Wife". In the fall of 2014, he again participated for the second time in Big Brother, this time winning.

== Rape case ==
From an early age, Slavkov imitated his father's dissolute lifestyle – he was drunk, gambled with significant stakes, and drove without documents. In 1988, model Mila Gesheva filed a complaint that on July 9–10 she was raped by Slavkov, the son of a Hungarian diplomat Zsolt Hajdu, who was studying in Bulgaria, and Orlin Nozharov in Hajdu's apartment.

Todor Zhivkov was personally informed about the case, after which the prosecutor's office terminated the investigation due to lack of evidence of a crime, and Slavkov himself was not interrogated. After this case, Slavkov was placed under the constant supervision of an employee of the Department of Safety and Security of the State Security. The following summer, at the insistence of Todor Zhivkov and his sister Evgenia Zhivkova, he was sent to study management in Switzerland at state expense.

While in Switzerland, he learned that the Zhivkov regime had fallen. On 18 December 1989, a month after his grandfather was overthrown, the investigation into the rape complaint against Slavkov was resumed. At the request of the Bulgarian authorities, the Swiss detained Todor Slavkov in 1994 and extradited him to Bulgaria on 15 February 1995 after eight months of arrest. In Sofia, Todor Slavkov spent another 13 months in prison and was released on bail in March 1996.

The trial for the rape of Gesheva started on 18 March 1996 in the district court. The Sofia District Court sentenced him to a year in prison for participating in the gang rape. Hajdu and Nozharov received three years in prison each. The court deducted the time during which Slavkov was in custody, and so it turned out that he had already served his sentence. The three convicts must pay the court costs in the amount of BGN 298,160, as well as BGN 10,000 to the plaintiff Mila Gesheva. The medical examination stated that at the time of the rape, Slavkov had a plaster cast and therefore could not have raped the girl. The second instance court – the Sofia City Court – acquitted all three in 2000.

== Death ==
On 21 July 2025, exactly 44 years after the death of his mother, Lyudmila Zhivkova, Todor Slavkov was found dead in a guest house in the Stara Zagora village of Asen. He was 54. According to the conclusion of the forensic medical examination, announced by the Regional Prosecutor's Office, the cause of death was suicide. It was revealed that he shot himself with a .22-caliber revolver that he owned.
