= Yaneva =

Yaneva is a surname. Notable people with the surname include:

- Eva Yaneva (born 1985), Bulgarian volleyball player
- Galina Yaneva (born 1959), Bulgarian gymnast
- Yuliana Yaneva, Bulgarian wrestler
- Zhana Yaneva (born 1990), Bulgarian model and beauty pageant titleholder
