= Lyudmila Zhivkova =

Bulgarian politician (1942–1981)

Lyudmila Todorova Zhivkova
- Людмила Тодорова Живкова
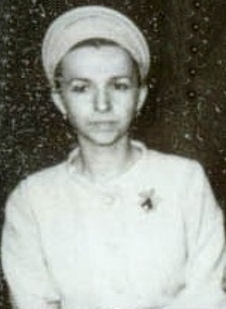

President of the Committee for Art and Culture
- In office 3 July 1975 – 21 July 1981
- Preceded by: Pavel Matev
- Succeeded by: Georgi Yordanov

Personal details
- Born: 26 July 1942 Govedartsi, Bulgaria
- Died: 21 July 1981 (aged 38) Sofia, Bulgaria
- Party: Bulgarian Communist Party
- Spouse(s): Lyubomir Stoychev (divorced); Ivan Slavkov
- Education: Sofia University; Moscow State University; St Antony's College, Oxford
- Committees: Committee for Art and Culture
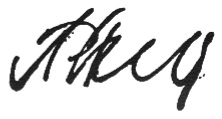
- Signature

Lyudmila Todorova Zhivkova (Bulgarian: Людмила Тодорова Живкова; 26 July 1942 – 21 July 1981) was a senior Bulgarian Communist Party functionary and Politburo member. She was the daughter of Bulgarian Communist leader Todor Zhivkov, and primarily known for her interest in preserving and promoting Bulgarian arts and culture on the international stage. Zhivkova was also a controversial figure within the former Soviet Bloc because of her interests in esoteric Eastern religion and spirituality.

== Biography ==
Zhivkova was born in Sofia to Zhivkov and Mara Maleeva-Zhivkova. She studied history at Sofia University (1965) and history of art at Moscow State University (1970), before researching a book on British-Turkish relations at St Antony's College, Oxford. Her mother, who had encouraged her scholarly work and did not want her to turn towards politics, died in 1971; this paved the way for her father to start fast-tracking her on a political career. She then became assistant president of the Committee for Art and Culture (1972–1973), its first vice president (1973–1975) and its president (with the rank of a minister) between 1975 and her death in 1981. Zhivkova was a deputy in the 7th (1976–1981) and 8th (1981) National Assembly of Bulgaria. In her lifetime, Zhivkova published a volume of "collected works" (mostly edited speeches) which was translated into major world languages; her trademark ideas about the need to bring up and educate "rounded personalities" and "imbue public life with beauty" sat awkwardly alongside militant Marxism–Leninism.

== Public office ==
Lyudmila Zhivkova's office as the de facto head of Bulgarian culture brought the nation's artistic community increased freedom at a time when, after the crushing of the Prague Spring, Soviet-bloc Communist orthodoxy was otherwise stricter than ever. Moreover, as daughter of the head of Party and state, Zhivkova was often seen as "heir apparent" and enjoyed powers beyond her official purview. Thus, Zhivkova and her second husband Ivan Slavkov held renowned Friday soirées at their central Sofia apartment, offering opportunities for those with a cause to lobby her father indirectly.

== Roerich year ==
In connection with her esoteric interests, she designated 1978 "Roerich Year", having encountered like-minded scion of Russian émigrés Svetoslav Roerich in India in 1975. Besides their artistic work as painters, the Roerichs were founders and proponents of Agni Yoga, an idiosyncratic spiritual teaching based on Indian mysticism, so celebrating them so intensively appeared a somewhat eccentric gesture for a Marxist government (admittedly, at the time the Roerichs were respected as artists, patriots and explorers in the USSR as well). A postage stamp with a portrait of Nicholas Roerich by his son Svetoslav was issued in that year.

== Death ==
Lyudmila died from a “brief illness” at the age of 38 on 21 July 1981, five days before her 39th birthday. As the daughter of the communist leader, she was accorded a very large public funeral in Bulgaria.

== Heritage ==
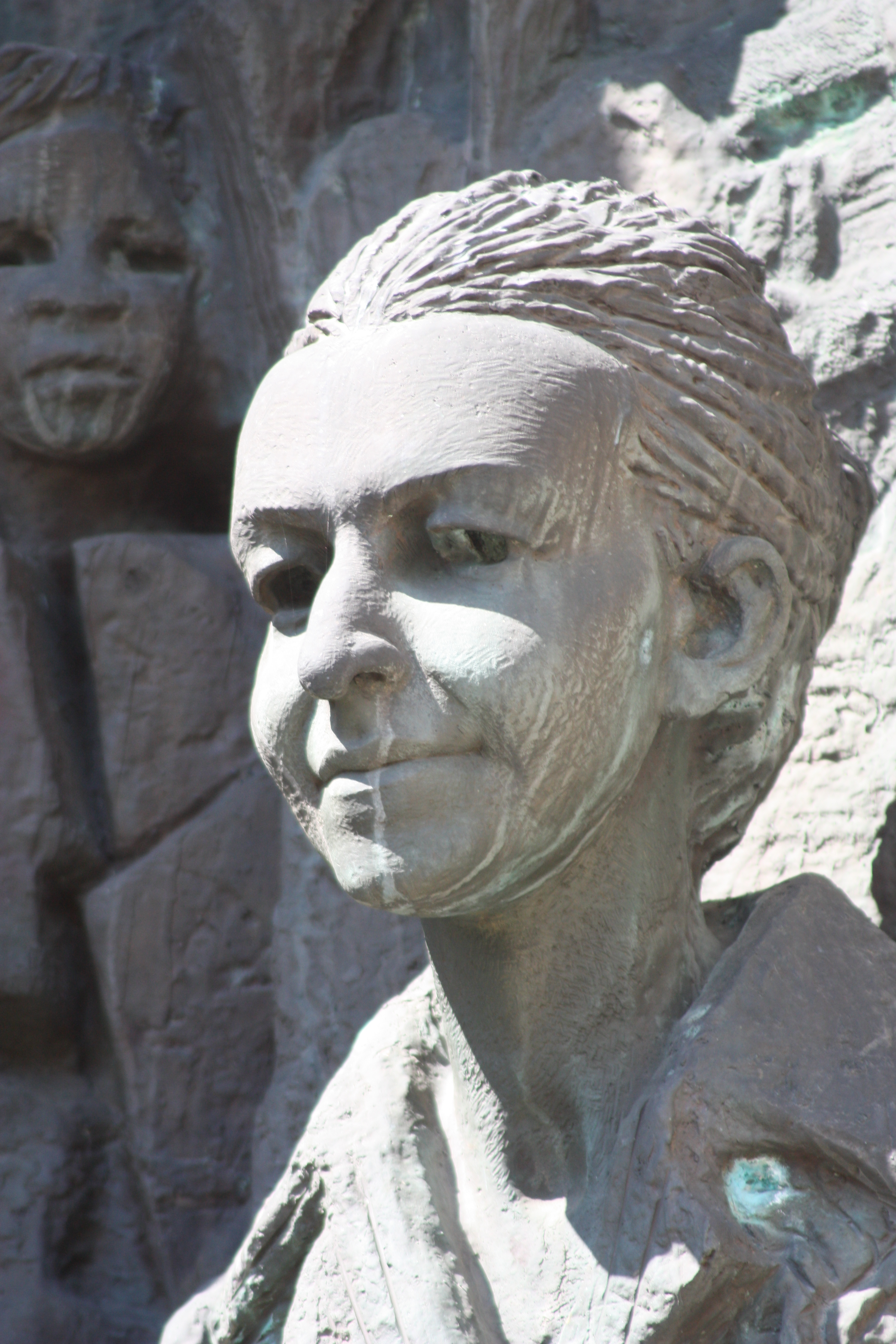
A sculpture of Zhivkova in Sofia.

Lyudmila Zhivkova's heritage remains disputed in Bulgaria. Some claim that she was the harbinger of alternative ideas, freedom and spirituality, not least through being a woman on Bulgaria's heavily male-dominated public scene. Others see her as the archetypal dissolute, spoilt, confused, imperious, and eternally unfulfilled child of the "Red Bourgeoisie." While her zeal was disturbingly notable on the glacial and ultra-conservative Soviet Bloc scene of the 1970s, today it appears to have brought nothing but minor (and moreover transient) advances, and to have prompted many to "raise their heads above the parapet" only to expose themselves to later persecution.

A point of view which emerged in the 1990s cites Zhivkova's marriage to earthy, hard-nosed, hard-drinking, bon-viveur Ivan Slavkov and her association with the widely compromised 1300 Years of Bulgaria Foundation, ascribing to her features of the post-Communist embezzlers, fraudsters and "kleptocrats" who shared out the spoils of Communist rule in the privatisation campaigns after the 1989 fall of Todor Zhivkov. This minority view reflects the overwhelmingly negative assessments of Zhivkova's father.

Zhivkova left a daughter, Evgeniya (Zheni), from her first marriage to Lybomir Stoychev, and a son, Todor, from her second marriage to Ivan Slavkov, one-time Bulgarian National Television chairman, Bulgarian Olympic Committee president and IOC member. After being adopted by her grandfather, Zheni Zhivkova became a fashion designer and a Coalition for Bulgaria National Assembly deputy.

== Sources ==
- Ташев, Ташо [Tashev, Tasho], „Министрите на България 1879–1999", ["Bulgarian Ministers of State, 1897 to 1999"] Sofia, Професор Марин Дринов/Издателство на Министерството на отбраната [Professor Marin Drinov and Izdatelstvo na ministerstvoto na otbranata], 1999
- Данаилов, Георги [Danailov, Georgi], „Доколкото си спомням" ["Inasmuch as I can recall"] Абагар [Abagar], 2002
- Георгиев, Никола [Georgiev, Nikola], „Нова книга за българския народ" ["A New Book about the Bulgarian Nation"], LiterNet, 2003
- Райнов, Богомил [Raynov, Bogomil], „Людмила — мечти и дела" ["Lyudmila: Dreams and Deeds"], Продуцентска къща 2 1/2 [Produtsentska kushta 2 1/2], 2003.
- Ivanka Nedeva Atanasova "Lyudmila Zhivkova and the Paradox of Ideology and Identity in Communist Bulgaria." East European Politics & Societies. Spring 2004, Vol. 18 Issue 2: 278–315.
- Clive Leviev-Sawyer, 'Think of me as fire' The Sofia Echo, 4 February 2011.
- Ana Luleva, "The Debate on the Communist Past and the Memory of Lyudmila Zhivkova in Bulgaria," Cultures of History Forum.
- "Lyudmila Zhivkova, Bulgaria Culture Aide" New York Times, Obituaries, 22 July 1981
