= Borislav Mihaylov =

Bulgarian football player and official (1963–2026)

- Борислав Михайлов
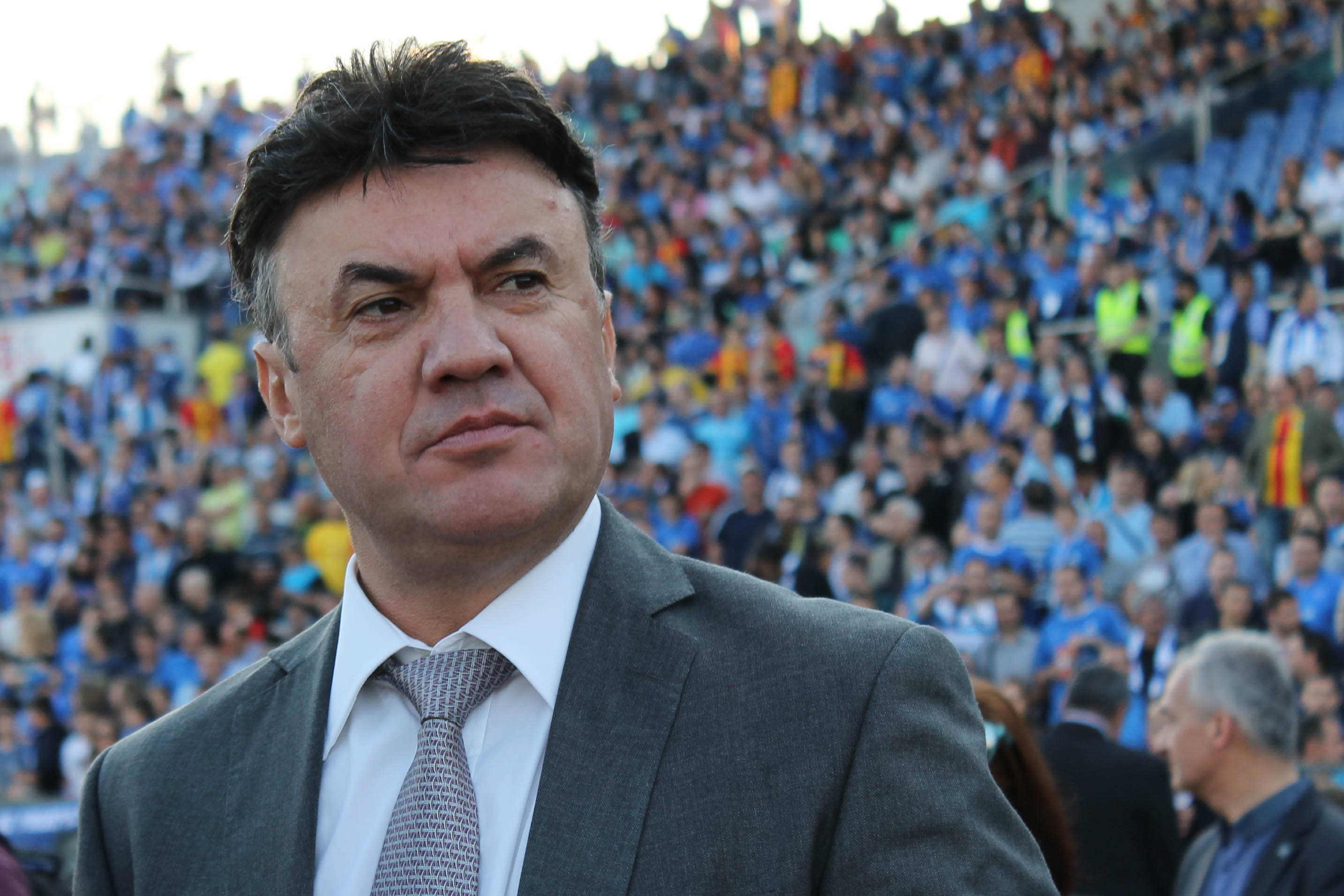
- Mihaylov in 2014

President of the Bulgarian Football Union
- In office 12 October 2021 – 27 November 2023
- Preceded by: Ivan Slavkov
- Succeeded by: Mihail Kasabov (interim)
- In office 21 October 2005 – 18 October 2019
- Preceded by: Mihail Kasabov (interim)
- Succeeded by: Emil Kostadinov (interim)

Personal details
- Born: Borislav Biserov Mihaylov; 12 February 1963 Sofia, PR Bulgaria
- Died: 31 March 2026 (aged 63) Sofia, Bulgaria
- Height: 6 ft 1 in (1.85 m)
- Occupation: Footballer; football administrator
Association football career
- Position: Goalkeeper
Senior career*
Years	Team	Apps	(Gls)
1981–1989	Levski Sofia	180	(0)
1989–1991	Belenenses	29	(0)
1992–1994	Mulhouse	65	(0)
1994–1995	Botev Plovdiv	20	(0)
1995–1997	Reading	24	(0)
1997–1998	Slavia Sofia	14	(0)
1998	FC Zürich	1	(0)
Total		333	(0)
International career
1983–1998	Bulgaria	102	(0)
- * Club domestic league appearances and goals

Borislav Biserov Mihaylov (Bulgarian: Борислав Бисеров Михайлов; 12 February 1963 – 31 March 2026) was a Bulgarian professional footballer who played as a goalkeeper and was twice president of the Bulgarian Football Union (2005–2019; 2021–2023). He was the longest-serving president of the Bulgarian Football Union, having been at the head of the organization for a total of 16 years. He was also a member of the executive committee of UEFA.

Mihaylov was captain of the Bulgaria national team during their major fourth-place run at the 1994 FIFA World Cup, as well as during their participation in the UEFA Euro 1996. He also played at the 1986 and 1998 FIFA World Cups and still is the second most-capped player of the Bulgaria national football team with 102 appearances, and the footballer with the most matches played (60) as captain.

== Club career ==
In 1995, Mihaylov joined English First Division team Reading for a then club record of £800,000, replacing the departed Shaka Hislop.

== Administrative roles ==
After retiring from active sports he started a career in football administration. He was vice-president of the Bulgarian Football Union from 2001 until 2005, when he replaced Ivan Slavkov as president of the Bulgarian Football Union.

On 22 March 2011, he was elected to the executive committee of UEFA.

On 15 October 2019, Mihaylov resigned as President of BFU after being asked to step down for ignoring racist behaviour during games.

On 28 April 2021, after a meeting with BFU, Mihaylov became the president again.

On 27 November 2023, he resigned again as President of BFU after a lot of pressure from football fans and being asked by a lot of famous people and politicians from Bulgaria, to step down from the position.

== Personal life and death ==
In 1998, he married Maria Petrova, a former prominent rhythmic gymnast. Borislav is the son of former goalkeeper Biser Mihaylov and the father of also former goalkeeper Nikolay Mihaylov, while his younger daughter is a tennis player.

On 24 November 2025, Mihaylov was admitted to hospital, with Bulgarian news agency BGNES reporting that he had suffered a stroke and was "in a moderate injured state". He died at a hospital in Sofia, on 31 March 2026, aged 63.

== Honours ==
Levski Sofia

- Bulgarian League (3): 1983–84, 1984–85, 1987–88
- Bulgarian Cup (3): 1982, 1984, 1986
- Cup of the Soviet Army (3): 1984, 1987, 1988

Individual

- Bulgarian Footballer of the Year: 1986

== See also ==
- List of men's footballers with 100 or more international caps
