= Bulgarian Football Union =

Association football governing body in Bulgaria

Български футболен съюз
UEFA
- Founded: 1923; 103 years ago
- Headquarters: Sofia
- FIFA affiliation: 1924
- UEFA affiliation: 15 June 1954; 72 years ago
- President: Georgi Ivanov
- Website: bfunion.bg

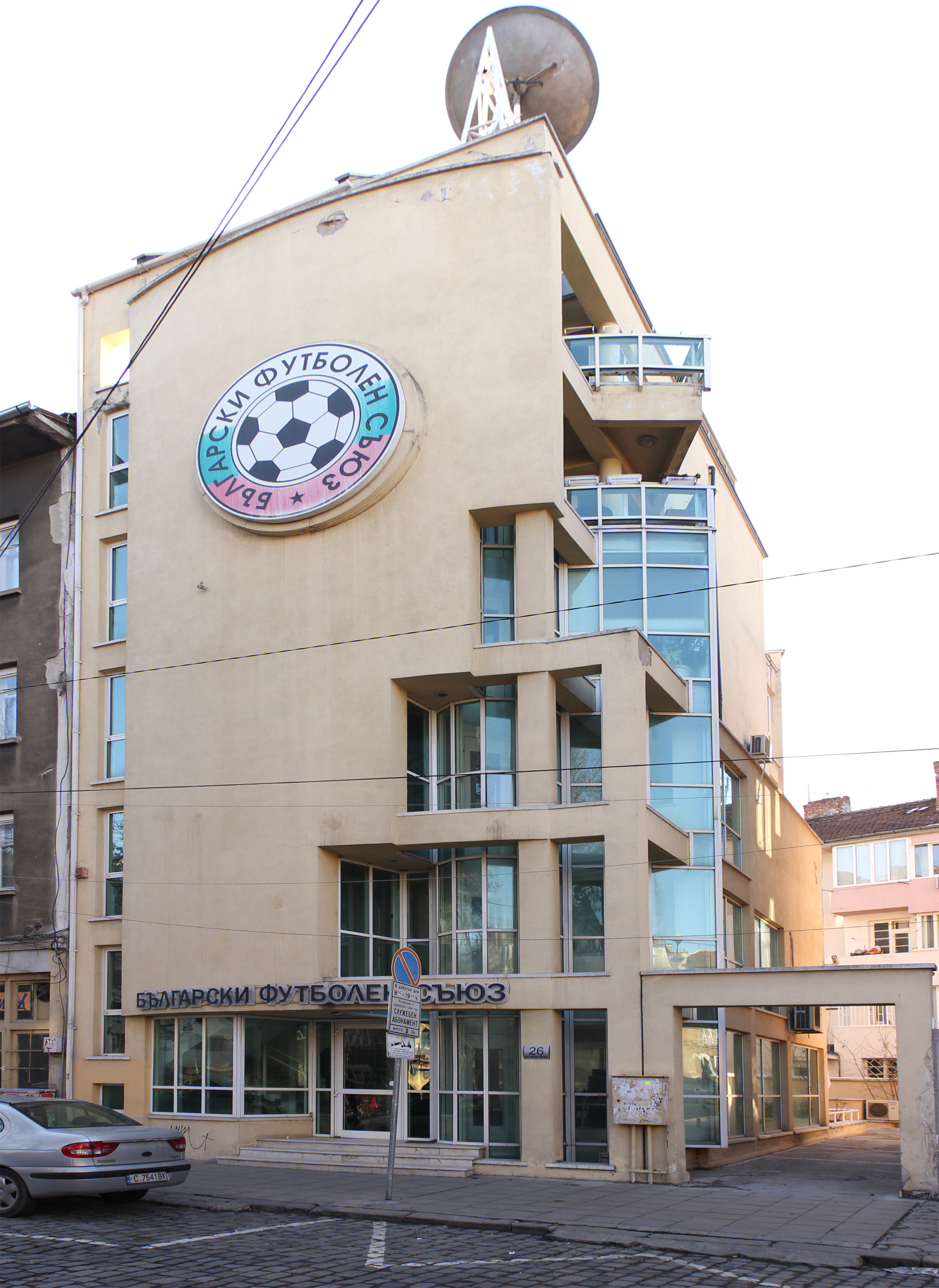
The old BFU headquarters in Sofia

Bulgarian Football Union (Bulgarian: Български футболен съюз, romanized: Bǎlgarski futbolen sǎyuz; BFS) is the governing body of association football in Bulgaria, and a member of UEFA since 1954. It organizes a football league, Bulgarian Parva Liga, and fields its Bulgaria national football team in UEFA and FIFA-authorised competitions.

== History ==
A legal entity that it claims descent from was founded in 1923 as the football department of the Bulgarian National Sports Federation, which existed until the Soviet invasion of 1944. The football governing body was then known as the Central Football Committee until 1948, the Republican Section for Football from 1948 until 1962 and the Bulgarian Football Federation from 1962 until 1985. On 27 June 1985, the organization was renamed the Bulgarian Football Union, the name that it carries today.

=== Resentment against Mihaylov (2015–2024) ===
Borislav Mihaylov became president of the union in 2004. The results of the national team and leading clubs in the country gradually started to decline in the following years, particularly after UEFA Euro 2004 and fans wanted Mihaylov to leave. On 15 October 2019, after long resentments because of the bad results of the national team and lowering of club level football, coupled with a scandal with the national team in the match against England, which involved racist chants from a group of Bulgarian fans aimed at English players. Following this incident, the sports minister announced that they will not work with the BFU until Mihaylov is in charge. After the England game, Mihaylov resigned. Mihail Kasabov become an interim president, but due to the Covid 19 pandemic, there was not a regular vote for Mihaylov to resign.

In 2021, to the surprise of many, Mihaylov announced he withdraws his resignation and will be joining the elections for a 5th mandate in 2021. At this point Dimitar Berbatov become a huge opposition of Mihaylov and also joined the elections. On 12 October 2021, Mihaylov won the elections despite the fact few voting violations were noted. In March 2023 the city count dropped lawsuits against Congressional decisions and Mihaylov was confirmed as the president, despite the fact that a few football clubs were kicked out from the vote, because they showed support for Berbatov.

In October 2023, football fans started a stronger resentment, having banners against Mihaylov on every match. As an answer, BFU started to punish clubs almost every match. The football fans announced they will have a big resentment, uniting ultras from every big football club in the country for the match against Hungary on 16 November 2023. In response to that, BFU and UEFA announced on 6 November that the match will be moved from National stadium to Hristo Botev Stadium in Plovdiv and will be behind closed doors. This decision was taken even harder, as for the first time, a football union didn't want their own fans on the stadium. The resentment was foreseen to move in Plovdiv outside the stadium. The Hungarians were also not happy with the decision for playing under closed doors and the fans announced they will still go for the match and join the protest against BFU.

On March 17th 2024 Georgi Ivanov was elected president. The election was held amid a lot of controversy in regards to the legitimacy of the outcome.

== Presidents ==
| President | Years in power |
|---|---|
| Pavel Grozdanov | 1923–1933 |
| Tsvetan Genov | 1933–1934 |
| Ivan Batandzhiev | 1934–1939 |
| Lyubomir Sokerov | 1940–1942 |
| Docho Hristov | 1942–1944 |
| Georgi Stoyanov | 1946–1948 |
| Isaac Catalan | 1948 |
| Ivan Nikolov | 1948–1949 |
| Mladen Nikolov | 1949–1951 |
| Petar Kolarov | 1951–1952 |
| Stefan Petrov | 1952–1959 |
| Lachezar Avramov | 1959–1961 |
| Kiril Nesterov | 1961–1962 |
| Nedyalko Donski | 1962–1970 |
| Danail Nikolov | 1970–1975 |
| Ivan Nikolov | 1975–1979 |
| Krum Vasilchev | 1979–1982 |
| Dimitar Nikolov | 1982–1984 |
| Ivan Shpatov | 1984–1986 |
| Andon Traykov | 1986–1990 |
| Slavcho Tapavicharov | 1990–1991 |
| Dimitar Largov | 1991–1993 |
| Valentin Mihov | 1993–1994 |
| Hristo Danov | 1994–1995 |
| Ivan Slavkov | 1995–2005 |
| Borislav Mihaylov | 2005–2019 |
| Mihail Kasabov (interim) | 2019–2021 |
| Borislav Mihaylov | 2021–2023 |
| Mihail Kasabov (interim) | 2023–2024 |
| Emil Kostadinov (interim) | 2024 |
| Georgi Ivanov | 2024– |

== Competitions ==
It organizes the following competitions:

Men's football

- First League, 1st level
- Second League, 2nd level
- Third League (4 divisions), 3rd level
- Regional Groups, 4th and 5th level
- Bulgarian Cup
- Bulgarian Supercup
- Cup of AFL (amateur cup)

Youth football

- Elite League; First league for academy sides, with three age categories, Under 17s, Under 16s and Under 15s sides

Women's football

- Bulgarian Women's League (or Swiss Capital League); First Women's Division
- Bulgarian Women's Cup

== National teams ==
The Bulgarian Football Union also organizes national football teams representing Bulgaria at all age levels:

| Position | Name | Nationality |
Men's
| Bulgaria national football team | Aleksandar Dimitrov | (Bulgaria) |
| Bulgaria U21 national football team | Todor Yanchev | (Bulgaria) |
| Bulgaria U19 national football team | Atanas Ribarski | (Bulgaria) |
| Bulgaria U18 national football team | N/A | (Bulgaria) |
| Bulgaria U17 national football team | Svetoslav Petrov | (Bulgaria) |
| Bulgaria U16 national football team | Petar Karachorov | (Bulgaria) |
| Bulgaria U15 national football team | Petar Karachorov | (Bulgaria) |
Women's
| Bulgaria women's national football team | Silvia Radoyska | (Bulgaria) |
| Bulgaria women's U17 national football team | Trayan Radulov | (Bulgaria) |
Futsal
| Bulgaria national futsal team | Bogomil Marev | (Bulgaria) |

== Current sponsorships ==
- Efbet
- Hörmann
- Volkswagen
- Vivacom
- Macron
