= Radostina Todorova =

Bulgarian model and beauty pageant titleholder

- Born: Radostina Todorova; 14 April 1995 (age 31); Vratsa, Bulgaria
- Height: 5 ft 9 in (1.75 m)
- Beauty pageant titleholder
- Title: Miss National Team Bulgaria 2014; Miss Universe Bulgaria 2015
- Hair color: Brown
- Eye color: Brown
- Major competitions: Miss National Team Bulgaria 2014 (Winner); Miss Universe Bulgaria 2015 (Appointed); Miss Universe 2015 (Unplaced)

Radostina Todorova (Bulgarian: Радостина Тодорова, born 14 April 1995) is a Bulgarian model and beauty pageant titleholder who was appointed as Miss Universe Bulgaria 2015 and represented Bulgaria at the Miss Universe 2015 pageant.

== Personal life ==
Todorova is an athlete and model in Sofia. In 2014, she was crowned Miss National Team Bulgaria, representing Vratsa.

=== Appointment ===
On 28 October 2015 Todorova was appointed as Miss Universe Bulgaria 2015 by Mega Talent Group, the franchise holders for Miss Universe in Bulgaria. The pageant was not held due to lack of time in organizing the pageant.

On 20 December 2015 Todorova competed in the Miss Universe 2015 pageant. She failed to place in the semi-finals.

Awards and achievements
Preceded by Kristina Georgieva	Miss Universe Bulgaria; 2015	Succeeded by Gabriella Kirova
