= Gaby Guha =

French-Bulgarian model (born 1999)

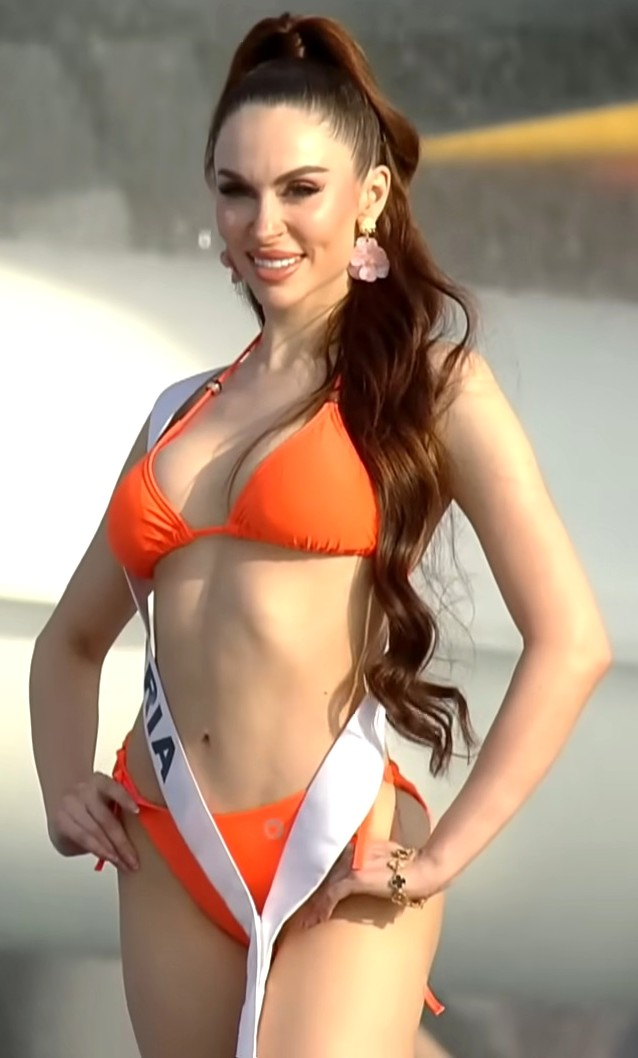
- Guha at Miss Universe 2025
- Born: Morgane Gaby Guha; October 1, 1999 (age 27); France
- Occupation: Model
- Height: 1.74 m (5 ft 8.5 in)
- Beauty pageant titleholder
- Title: Miss Universe Bulgaria 2025
- Hair color: Brown
- Eye color: Hazel
- Major competitions: Miss Universe Bulgaria 2025 (Appointed); Miss Universe 2025 (Unplaced)

Morgane Gaby Guha (born October 1, 1999) is a French-Bulgarian model and beauty pageant titleholder. She was appointed Miss Universe Bulgaria 2025, she represented Bulgaria at the 74th Miss Universe competition in Thailand.

== Personal life ==
Guha was born in France and is a French, and Bulgarian descent. She began her modeling career at the age of 17 after signing with VIP models agency in south of France.

Guha is multilingual and is represented by modeling agencies in Europe, Asia, the United States, and the Middle East. As of 2025, she resides in Dubai.

== Career ==
Guha began modeling professionally in Paris in 2014 and expanded to work in various Asian markets by 2015. She has participated in campaigns and runway shows for brands including Chaumet, Elie Saab, Jean Louis David, Gap, Bossini, Triumph Lingerie, and Robert Abi Nader. Her work has appeared on the covers of fashion and lifestyle publications such as Prestige, ICON, Playboy, Garo, Gezno, Le Désir, and L'Officiel. She has also made appearances on television networks including Fashion TV, MTV, Canal+, and M6.

== Pageantry ==
In May 2019, Guha represented France at the Miss Supermodel Worldwide competition in New Delhi, India, and finished as second runner-up.

On March 10, 2020, she represented France at Miss Europe 2020 (Lebanon-based; formerly Miss Europe World), held in Beirut, Lebanon. She was selected as the winner among 46 contestants.

On April 21, 2025, Guha was appointed Miss Universe Bulgaria 2025. She represented Bulgaria at Miss Universe 2025, held on November 21, 2025, at the Impact Arena in Nonthaburi, Thailand.

== Business ==
In 2022, Gaby Guha founded Gaby Beauty in the United Arab Emirates, which was sold in 2024.

== Appearances ==
Guha has attended fashion industry events including London Fashion Week and the Cannes Film Festival. In 2023, she appeared on the red carpet at the 76th Cannes Film Festival wearing a custom gown by designer Nikhita Tandon.

Awards and achievements
Preceded by Elena Vian	Miss Universe Bulgaria; 2025	Succeeded by Anna Babau
