= Saša Antunović =

Serbian footballer

Personal information
- Full name: Saša Antunović
- Date of birth: 4 November 1974 (age 51)
- Place of birth: Pristina, SR Serbia, SFR Yugoslavia
- Height: 1.88 m (6 ft 2 in)
- Position: Centre forward

Senior career*
Years	Team	Apps	(Gls)
1995–1996	Priština		
1996–1997	Čukarički	5	(0)
1997–1998	Priština	20	(3)
1998–2002	Sartid Smederevo	87	(19)
2002–2003	Spartak Varna	27	(5)
2004	Sartid Smederevo	15	(2)
2005–2008	Lokomotiv Sofia	78	(30)
2009	Kom-Minyor	2	(0)
2010	Seljak Mihajlovac		
2011	Hajduk Beograd	9	(2)
Total		243	(61)
- * Club domestic league appearances and goals

Saša Antunović (Serbian Cyrillic: Саша Антуновић; born 4 November 1974) is a Serbian former professional footballer who played as a centre forward.

== Career ==
Antunović started out with his hometown club Priština and played in the Second League of FR Yugoslavia. He subsequently moved to Čukarički and managed to score once in the 1996 UEFA Intertoto Cup. Later on, Antunović returned to his parent club Priština for one season, before joining newly promoted First League of FR Yugoslavia side Sartid Smederevo in 1998. He spent the next four years with the Oklopnici.

In 2002, Antunović moved abroad to Bulgarian club Spartak Varna. He then returned to Sartid Smederevo in early 2004. During the 2004–05 season, Antunović moved back to Bulgaria and signed with Lokomotiv Sofia. He made 78 appearances and scored 30 goals for the side in the top flight.

== Personal life ==
In 2009, Antunović was a contestant on the third season of the Bulgarian reality show VIP Brother.
