= Veneta Krasteva =

Bulgarian model and beauty queen, Miss Universe Bulgaria winner

- Венета Кръстева
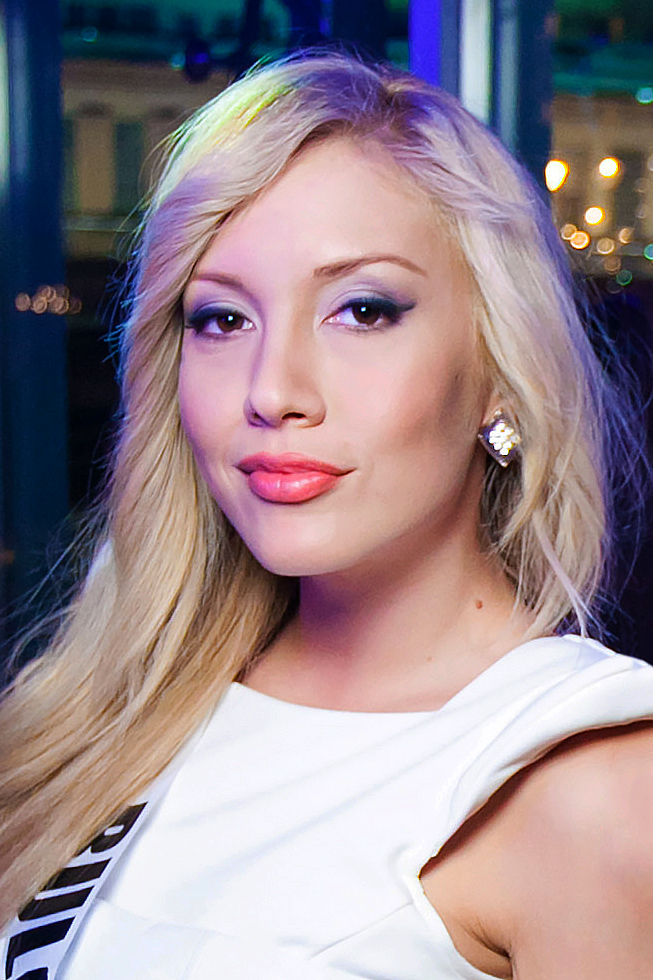
- Krasteva in 2013
- Born: Veneta Krasimirova Krasteva; 23 December 1991 (age 34); Sofia, Bulgaria
- Other name: Veneta Krasteva
- Occupations: Beauty Expert, Beauty pageant entrepreneur, National director of the Miss Universe Bulgaria and Miss World Bulgaria pageant
- Height: 1.75 m (5 ft 9 in)
- Beauty pageant titleholder
- Title: Miss Universe Bulgaria 2013; Miss Tourism Bulgaria 2014; Miss Grand Bulgaria 2015; Miss World Bulgaria 2015
- Hair color: Blond
- Eye color: Brown
- Major competitions: Miss Universe; Miss Tourism International; Miss Grand International; Miss World

Veneta Krasimirova Krasteva (Bulgarian: Венета Красимирова Кръстева; born 23 December 1991) is a Bulgarian model and beauty pageant titleholder who was crowned Miss Universe Bulgaria 2013 and Miss World Bulgaria 2015 and the president of the Miss World Bulgaria Organization. She represented Bulgaria at Miss Universe 2013 and Miss World 2015 and had the distinction of being the first and only Bulgarian to represent Bulgaria at two of the largest and oldest international pageants in the world Miss World and Miss Universe. Veneta is currently the president of the Miss World, Mr. World and Miss Universe Bulgaria Organization.

== Early life ==
Veneta was born in Sofia, Bulgaria. She attended 127th High School "Ivan N. Denkoglu" and later studied Tourism at Sofia University.

== Pageantry ==
=== Miss Universe Bulgaria 2013 ===
Veneta bested other 29 contestants to be crowned Miss Bulgaria Universe 2013 at the conclusion of the pageant held on 22 September 2013 at the Sofia Event Center.

=== Miss Universe 2013 ===
Veneta represented Bulgaria at the 62nd annual Miss Universe 2013 at the Crocus City Hall, Krasnogorsk, a suburb of Moscow, Russia.

=== Miss World Bulgaria 2015 ===
Veneta was appointed as Miss World Bulgaria and competed at Miss World 2015 pageant.

=== Miss World 2015 ===
Veneta represented Bulgaria at the 65th edition of the Miss World pageant held on 19 December 2015 at the Crown of Beauty Theatre in Sanya, China PR.

== Personal life ==
Since 2016, she became the Official Executive Director of the leading fashion and model agency Bok Star Models based in Sofia licensee of Miss World and Mister World, Miss Universe and Miss Grand International for Bulgaria. Veneta gave birth to her first child - a son named Maximilian Oustabassidis in Haselt, Belgia on 16 April 2018.

Veneta serves as an ambassador for the Beauty with a Purpose Program.

Awards and achievements
Preceded by Zhana Yaneva	Miss Universe Bulgaria; 2013	Succeeded by Kristina Georgieva

Awards and achievements	Miss World Bulgaria; 2015	Succeeded by Galina Mihaylova
