= Mara Maleeva-Zhivkova =

Bulgarian physician, and the First Lady of Bulgaria (1954–1971)

Mara Hristova Maleeva-Zhivkova (born July 12, 1911, Plovdiv; died October 23, 1971, Sofia, People's Republic of Bulgaria) was a Bulgarian physician, and the First Lady of Bulgaria (1954–1971) as the wife of Todor Zhivkov, who was the General Secretary of the Central Committee of the Bulgarian Communist Party (1954–1989).

== Early life ==
Mara Maleeva was born in 1911 into a family of primary school teachers Hristo Maleev and Nedelya Altunova.

In 1928, the whole family moved to Sofia, where Maleeva graduated from the First Sofia Women's Gymnasium in 1930 and entered Sofia University (she studied with the medical faculty until 1938). As a student, she became a member of the Communist Organizations of the Workers' Youth Union and the Bulgarian National Student Union, and joined the Bulgarian Communist Party (BCP) in 1933, working as a technical assistant on its Central Committee. In 1936, she met the communist activist Todor Zhivkov (1911–1998). After graduating from university she worked as a village doctor.

== Medical activity ==
In 1938, Mara Maleeva got a job as a district doctor in the Pavlytsia village of Daskot, Veliko Tarnovo Province, where her friend and peer Todor Zhivkov later came. In the following months, he lived there without a job but supported Maleev by participating in amateur theatrical productions. As their cohabitation by civil marriage caused dissatisfaction in the village, in April 1939 they married in Pavlikeni. Mara was more intellectually and culturally developed compared to the village boy T. Zhivkov and he had to try to keep up with her in the area of education.

At the end of the year, Maleev was assigned to the village of Lesichovo in Pazardzhik, where the family spent several months. In February 1940, Zhivkova and Maleeva left Lesichovo and, after a short stay in Pravets and the Chirpan village of Orizovo, settled in August in Govedarka near Samokov. In the following years Maleeva was a district physician there.

== First Lady of Bulgaria ==
From June 1943, Todor Zhivkov was a member of the staff of the First Revolutionary Working Zone and a prosecutor of the "Chavdar" partisan detachment. Mara Maleeva helped him, treated sick and wounded partisans, and illegally provided medicines and bandages. On September 9, 1944, Todor Zhivkov began working for the People's Militia in Sofia and moved his family there. Mara Maleeva became an employee of the first internal clinic of the Higher Medical Institute, where she laid the foundations of free medical care in Bulgaria.

Later, Mara Maleeva left her medical career and worked in the party apparatus, for some time she was a municipal councilor. Although she did not hold official positions, according to Todor Zhivkov, she was one of his closest associates since his election as secretary of the Central Committee in 1950.

During the reign of Todor Zhivkov, both brothers of Mara Maleeva had a quick career: Atanas Maleyev was a longtime head of the Medical Academy and Deputy Minister of Health, and Naiden Maleyev - a judge in the Supreme Court.

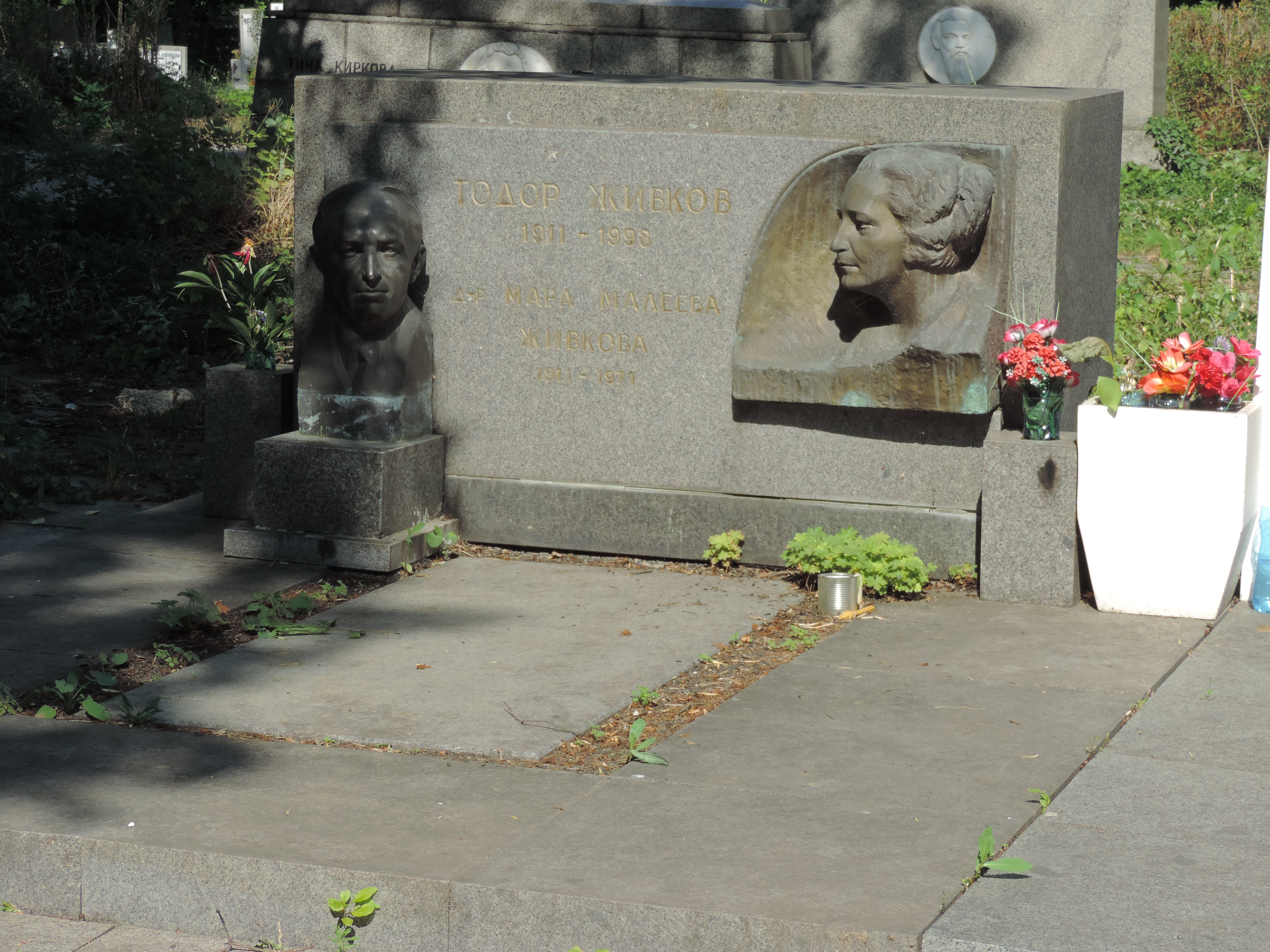
Tomb of Mara Maleeva-Zhivkova and Todor Zhivkov at the Central Sofia Cemetery

Maleeva Zhivkova devoted herself to her family and helping her husbands political career. Partly because of this, her husband made a quick career in the party and the state, taking the post of First Secretary of the Central Committee of the Bulgarian Communist Party, Prime Minister and Deputy Head of State as President of the State Council of the Bulgarian People's Republic.

Mara became the wife of the communist leader of Bulgaria, whose name and photos regularly appeared in Bulgarian newspapers. Unlike the first ladies of Western countries, she did not wear jewelry and jewels, she did not lead a secular life, but entered the history of Bulgaria as one of the most intelligent, erudite, and cultured wives of the rulers of Bulgaria. She often accompanied Zhivkov on trips abroad, prepared for the peculiarities and culture of the country, and actively participated in the meetings and negotiations of the Bulgarian leader. She was fluent in French, which at the time was considered the language of diplomacy.

She took on the solution of many issues and problems instead of her husband. She responded not only to hundreds of daily letters from people who had fallen victim to any injustice, but also to much of Zhivkov's correspondence. She kept her husband from many controversial decisions with her advice.

Mara Maleeva encouraged the scholarly work of her and Zhivkov's daughter Lyudmila and did not want the latter to turn towards politics. Maleeva's death in 1971 paved the way for her husband to start fast-tracking Lyudmila on a political career.

The tomb of Mara Maleeva-Zhivkova and Todor Zhivkov is in the Central Cemetery in Sofia.
