= Zhana Yaneva =

Bulgarian model and beauty pageant titleholder

Joan Yaneva
- Born: Zhana Yaneva; 1990 (age 35–36); Sofia, Bulgaria
- Height: 1.78 m (5 ft 10 in)
- Beauty pageant titleholder
- Title: Miss Universe Bulgaria 2012
- Major competitions: Miss Universe Bulgaria 2012 (winner); Miss Universe 2012 (unplaced)

Zhana Yaneva (Bulgarian: Жана Янева; born 1990) is a Bulgarian model and beauty pageant titleholder who was crowned Miss Universe Bulgaria 2012 and represented Bulgaria in the 2012 Miss Universe pageant.

== Miss Universe Bulgaria 2012 & Miss Universe 2012 ==
Zhana Yaneva was crowned Miss Universe Bulgaria 2012 during a new competition held at the Big Apple club in the Sin City of Sofia, on September 29. Standing 178 cm in height, Vaneva represented Bulgaria in the 2012 Miss Universe pageant held on 19 December 2012 in Las Vegas. This marks the return of Bulgaria to international competition after a two-year absence. Their last participation took place in 2009. She represented Bulgaria in Miss Universe 2012.

She has previous experience in pageants prior to becoming Miss Universe Bulgaria, including as "Miss Blagoevgrad 2008", first runner-up at "Miss Sofia Autumn 2010", and winning "Miss Marilyn Blagoevgrad 2010".

Awards and achievements
Preceded by	Miss Universe Bulgaria; 2012	Succeeded by Veneta Kristeva
