= Antonia Petrova =

Bulgarian lawyer (born 1984)

- Born: Antonia Petrova; 1984 (age 41–42); Pazardjik, Bulgaria
- Beauty pageant titleholder
- Title: Miss Bulgaria 2009

Antonia Petrova (Bulgarian: Антония Петрова, born 1984) is a Bulgarian lawyer, actress and beauty pageant titleholder who was the winner of Miss Bulgaria 2009. She represented the country at Miss World 2009 which took place in December 2009. She crowned her successor Miss Bulgaria, Romina Andonova, in April 2010.

Almost immediately after winning her crown, Petrova became a contestant in the third season of VIP Brother (the celebrity edition of the reality show Big Brother) in Bulgaria. She spent 14 days in the house, and then voluntarily walked.

Petrova has Studied Law at UNSS.

There's an Austrian model who is also named "Antonia Petrova" (born in the Bulgarian capital Sofia in 1991).
