= Miss World Bulgaria =

Beauty pageant

- Formation: 1988
- Founder: Strahil Ganovski
- Type: beauty pageant
- Headquarters: Sofia
- Location: Bulgaria
- Members: Miss World
- Official language: Bulgarian
- President: Veneta Krasteva
- Key people: Julia Morley
- Website: missworldbulgaria.org/en/

Miss World Bulgaria (Bulgarian: Мис Свят България) is a national beauty pageant in Bulgaria that selects the Bulgarian’s representatives to compete in four of the Big Four international beauty pageants: Miss World and Miss Universe. Additionally, it selects semifinalist titleholders to participate in the Miss Grand International and Miss Earth pageants.

== Owners ==
Miss World Bulgaria was established in 1988. Strahil Ganovski founded and organized the first beauty contest in Bulgaria with international participation and named it "Miss Rodina" in 1988. That was the first time in the history of Bulgaria that the country sent a representative to the Miss World contest. Additionally, the first and only Bulgarian at two of the largest and oldest international pageants in the world Miss World and Miss Universe – Miss World Bulgaria 2015 and Miss Universe Bulgaria 2013 Veneta Krasteva is the exclusive licensee and national director of Miss World Bulgaria, Mister World Bulgaria, Miss Universe Bulgaria and Miss Grand Bulgaria a national pageants that searches for Bulgarian' representative to the Miss World, Mister World, Miss Universe and Miss Grand International contest respectively.

Over the years, Bulgarian representatives to the international Miss World pageants were chosen from candidates at the Miss World Bulgaria and Miss Bulgaria pageants.

== Bulgarian representatives at Miss World ==
Color key

- Ended as one of the finalists or semifinalists

Year	Miss World Bulgaria	Placement at Miss World
1988	Sonia Vassilieva	
1989	No pageant in 1989	
1990	Violeta Galabova	
1991	Liubomira Slavcheva	
1992	Elena Draganova	
1993	Vera Roussinova	
1994	Stella Ognianova	
1995	Evgenia Kalkandzhieva	Top 10
1996	Viara Kamenova	
1997	Simona Velitchkova	
1998	Polina Petkova	
1999	Violeta Zdravkova	
2000	Ivanka Peytcheva	
2001	Stanislava Karabelova	
2002	Desislava Antoniya Guleva	
2003	Rajna Naldzhieva	
2004	Gergana Guncheva	
2005	Rositsa Ivanova	
2006	No pageant in 2006	
2007	Paolina Racheva	
2008	Julia Yurevich	
2009	Antonia Petrova	
2010	Romina Andonova	
2011	Vanya Peneva	
2012	Gabriela Vasileva	
2013	Nansi Karaboycheva	
2014	No pageant in 2014	
2015	Veneta Krasteva	
2016	Galina Mihaylova	
2017	Veronika Stefanova	
2018	Kalina Miteva	
2019	Margo Cooper	
2020	Due to the impact of COVID-19 pandemic, no world pageant in 2020	
2021	Eva Dobreva	
2022	Kristiyana Yordanova	No world pageant in 2022
2023	Ivana Subeva	
2024	Elvira Yordanova	No world pageant in 2024
2025	Teodora Miltenova	
2026	Tsevetelina Lozanova	TBA
