= Miss Universe Bulgaria =

National beauty pageant competition in Bulgaria

Miss Universe Bulgaria Organization Мис България Вселена
- Formation: 1991; 35 years ago
- Type: Beauty pageant
- Headquarters: Sofia
- Location: Bulgaria
- Members: Miss Universe
- Agency: Bok Star Models
- Key people: Veneta Krasteva (President)
- Website: bokstarmodels.com/en/

Miss Universe Bulgaria (‘‘Bulgarian: Мис Вселена България’’; ‘‘English: Miss Universe Bulgaria’’) is a national title, part of the national beauty pageant Miss World Bulgaria in the Bulgaria that selects Bulgarian representatives to compete in two of the Big Four international beauty pageants: Miss World and Miss Universe and selects five other titleholders to participate in minor international pageants such as Miss Grand International, Miss Asia Pacific, Top Model of the World, Miss Tourism International and Miss Model of the World.

The Miss Universe Bulgaria title, is part of the Miss World Bulgaria an annual pageant to identify young Bulgarian women who exemplify beauty, talent, intelligence and compassion.

== Owners ==
The license for the Miss Universe Bulgaria is property of Fashion Agency “BokStarModels”.

== National franchise holders ==
- 1991 Vassil Papazov (Intersound)
- 1998 (Intersound)
- 2000 Strahil Ganovski (Megatalant)(Bok Smart Models)
- 2001 Strahil Ganovski (Bok Star Models)
- 2002 Strahil Ganovski (Bok Star Models)
- 2003 Iliana Ivanova - Mincheva (Visages)
- 2012 Strahil Ganovski (Bok Star Models)
- 2015 Magdalina Georgieva (Rara Avis Ltd.)
- 2017 Vaneta Krasteva (Bok Star Models)

== Titleholders ==
- Declared as Winner
- Ended as runner-up or top 5/6 qualification
- Ended as one of the finalists or semifinalists
- Ended as special awards winner

Year	Province	Miss Universe Bulgaria	Bulgarian Name	Placement at Miss Universe	Special Award(s)
Vaneta Krasteva (Bok Star Models) directorship – a franchise holder to Miss Universe from 2017
2026	Sofia	Anna Babau	Анна Бабау	Did not compete	
2025	Paris	Gaby Guha	Габи Гуха	Unplaced	
2024	Haskovo	Elena Vian	Елена Виан	Unplaced	
2023	Kerch	Yuliia Pavlikova	Юлия Павликова	Unplaced	
2022	Vratsa	Kristina Plamenova	Кристина Пламенова	Unplaced	
2021	Plòvdiv	Elena Danova	Елена Данова	Unplaced	
2020	Sofia	Radinela Chusheva	Радинела Чушева	Unplaced	
2019	Vratsa	Lora Asenova	Лора Асенова	Unplaced	
2018	Plòvdiv	Gabriela Topalova	Габриела Топалова	Unplaced	
2017	Sofia	Nikoleta Todorova	Николета Тодорова	Unplaced	
Magdalina Georgieva (Rara Avis Ltd.) – a franchise holder to Miss Universe in 2015–2016
2016	Sofia	Violina Ancheva	Виолина Анчева	Unplaced	
2015	Vratsa	Radostina Todorova	Радостина Тодорова	Unplaced	
Strahil Ganovski (Bok Star Models) directorship – a franchise holder to Miss Universe in 2012–2014
2014	Sofia	Kristina Georgieva	Кристина Георгиева	Unplaced	
2013	Sofia	Veneta Krasimirova Krasteva	Венета Красимирова Кръстева	Unplaced	
2012	Blagoevgrad	Zhana Yaneva	Жана Янева	Unplaced	
Iliana Ivanova -Mincheva (Visages) directorship – a franchise holder to Miss Universe in 2003–2009
Did not compete in 2010–2011
2009	Ruse	Elitsa Lubenova	Елица Любенова	Unplaced	
Did not compete in 2008
2007	Sofia	Gergana Kochanova	Гергана Кочанова	Unplaced	
2006	Stara Zagora	Galena Dimova	Галена Димова	Unplaced	
2005	Sofia	Galina Gancheva	Галина Ганчева	Unplaced	
2004	Sofia	Ivelina Petrova	Ивелина Петрова	Unplaced	
2003	Sofia	Elena Tihomirova	Елена Тихомирова	Unplaced	
Strahil Ganovski (Bok Star Models) directorship – a franchise holder to Miss Universe in 2002
2002	Sofia	Elina Georgieva	Елина Георгиева	Unplaced	
Strahil Ganovski (Bok Star Models) directorship – a franchise holder to Miss Universe in 2001
2001	Varna	Ivayla Bakalova	Ивайла Бакалова	Unplaced	
Strahil Ganovski (Megatalant)(Bok Smart Models) directorship – a franchise holder to Miss Universe in 2000
2000	Vratsa	Magdalina Valchanova	Магдалина Вълчанова	Unplaced	
Did not compete in 1999
(Intersound) directorship – a franchise holder to Miss Universe in 1998
1998	Sofia	Natalia Gurkova	Наталия Гуркова	Unplaced	
Vassil Papazov (Intersound) directorship – a franchise holder to Miss Universe in 1991–1997
1997	Varna	Krasimira Todorova	Красимира Тодорова	Unplaced	
1996	Sofia	Maria Sinigerova	Мария Синигерова	Unplaced	
1995	Sofia	Boiana Dimitrova	Бояна Димитрова	Unplaced	
1994	Sofia	Nevena Marinova	Невена Маринова	Unplaced	
1993	Sofia	Lilia Koeva	Лилия Коева	Unplaced	
1992	Sofia	Mihaela Nikolova	Михаела Николова	Unplaced	
1991	Sofia	Kristina Drumeva	Кристина Друмева	Unplaced	

== Notes ==
- Miss Universe Bulgaria 2023: In 2024, Yuliia was selected by Miss Universe Organization as a National director of Miss Universe Estonia & Armenia Organization.
- Miss Universe Bulgaria 2017: Nikoleta Todorova replaced the original winner of Miss Universe Bulgaria 2017, Mira Simeonova of Sofia as a result of Mira not meeting the minimum age requirements; Nikoleta was a runner-up during the Miss Universe Bulgaria 2017 pageant.
- Miss Universe Bulgaria 2013: Since 2017 Veneta started as the national director of Miss Universe Bulgaria Organization.

== See also ==
- Miss World Bulgaria
