= Nansi Karaboycheva =

Bulgarian model

Nansi Karaboycheva-Dimitrova
- Born: Nansi Nikolaeva Karaboycheva; 3 April 1993 (age 33); Pazardzhik, Bulgaria
- Occupation: Model
- Height: 1.70 m (5 ft 7 in)
- Beauty pageant titleholder
- Title: Miss Bulgaria 2013
- Hair color: Blond
- Eye color: Light blue
- Major competitions: Miss World Bulgaria 2013; Miss World 2013

Nancy Karaboycheva-Dimitrova (Bulgarian: Нанси Карабойчева-Димитрова, born 1993) is a Bulgarian model who won the title of Miss Bulgaria in 2013. She represented her country at Miss World 2013 which took place in Indonesia in September 2013. Karaboycheva reached the semi-finals and was also placed in the top 10 based on the audience's vote.

== Personal life ==
Karaboycheva graduated from a language high school (Bertolt Brecht in Pazardzhik) with German, but her specialty in the University is informatics and statistics. She was a student in UNSS, where she also studied Master in Marketing. Karaboycheva is in a long-term relationship with Bulgarian national volleyball player Dobromir Dimitrov. They married on 27 of July 2018.

They have 2 kids - firstborn child Matey Dimitrov (28.07.2020) and second one - Yoan Dimitrov (17.07.2021).

Awards and achievements
Preceded by Gabriela Vasileva	Miss Bulgaria; 2013	Succeeded by Simona Evgenieva
