= Ivan Slavkov =

Bulgarian sports executive (1940–2011)

Ivan Slavkov (Bulgarian: Иван Славков) (11 May 1940, Sofia – 1 May 2011, Sofia) was a Bulgarian sports boss linked to the Communist-era nomenklatura. He served as the President of the Bulgarian Olympic Committee (BOC) between 1982 and 2005 and was a member of the International Olympic Committee (IOC) between 1987 and 2005.

During the Communist regime in Bulgaria, Slavkov married Lyudmila Zhivkova, daughter of Bulgaria's Communist leader Todor Zhivkov. Despite his unclear qualifications, he was appointed head of the state-controlled Bulgarian Television in 1972.

In 1982 Slavkov left Bulgarian television and became the President of the Bulgarian Olympic Committee.

== Controversy and scandals ==
After the collapse of Communism in Bulgaria, Slavkov (also known as "Bateto", meaning "the elder brother" in Bulgarian) was accused, but subsequently acquitted of several crimes including gross embezzlement of public funds from Sofia's unsuccessful bid for the 1994 Winter Olympics.

In 2000 Slavkov was investigated by the IOC after it was alleged he offered support to a businessman who went on to try and solicit bribes from Cape Town when they were bidding to stage the 2004 Games. According to Chris Ball, who led the Cape Town bid, the businessman had a letter signed by Slavkov in his capacity as President of the Bulgarian NOC and this man then went on to suggest that he could deliver IOC votes in return for money. Cape Town refused to pay bribes and reported the incident to the IOC. In 2000 the IOC Ethics Commission decided "after an exhaustive examination of the facts and elements, not to pursue the examination of the Slavkov affair."

In 2004 undercover reporters from BBC's programme Panorama secretly filmed Slavkov in a meeting during which he and an associate, Goran Takač, suggested that Slavkov is willing to vote for London's 2012 Olympic bid and solicit votes from other IOC members in exchange for bribes. The programme was broadcast on BBC on 4 August 2004. The IOC Ethics Commission immediately recommended that Ivan Slavkov is provisionally deprived "of all the rights, prerogatives and functions deriving from his membership of the IOC" throughout their investigation and that the accreditations of Goran Takač, Gabor Komyathy, Mahmood El Farnawani and Muttaleb Ahmad are immediately withdrawn for the duration of the Olympic Games in Athens.

The IOC Ethics Commission produced a full report on the incident on October 25, 2004, in which it concluded that Mr Slavkov's actions were "contrary to the ethical principles derived from the Olympic Charter and the IOC code of ethics and of an extremely serious nature", and recommended his expulsion from IOC.

On Thursday 7 July 2005 at the IOC session in Singapore Slavkov was charged with bringing the IOC into disrepute. 82 members voted in favour of expelling him, with only 12 voting against despite Slavkov making a 20-minute plea to the committee. Slavkov was also barred from being chairman of the Bulgarian national Olympic committee, a post he held even after being suspended from the IOC.

After public outcry in Bulgaria, Slavkov was replaced as President of the Bulgarian Olympic Committee by retired Bulgarian olympic high jumper Stefka Kostadinova, and as President of the Bulgarian Football Union by Borislav Mihaylov, the former captain of the Bulgaria national football team.

In 2001 he established a political party named Forward Bulgaria (modeled after Silvio Berlusconi's Forza Italia) which failed to clear the 4% barrier in order to enter Parliament.

On 1 May 2011 Slavkov died in a government hospital following lung complications at age 70, 10 days shy of his 71st birthday.
