= 72nd Venice International Film Festival =

2015 Italian film festival

- Festival poster
- Opening film: Everest
- Closing film: Mr. Six
- Location: Venice, Italy
- Founded: 1932
- Awards: Golden Lion: From Afar
- Hosted by: Elisa Sednaoui
- Artistic director: Alberto Barbera
- Festival date: 2 – 12 September 2015
- Website: Website

Venice Film Festival chronology
- 73rd 71st

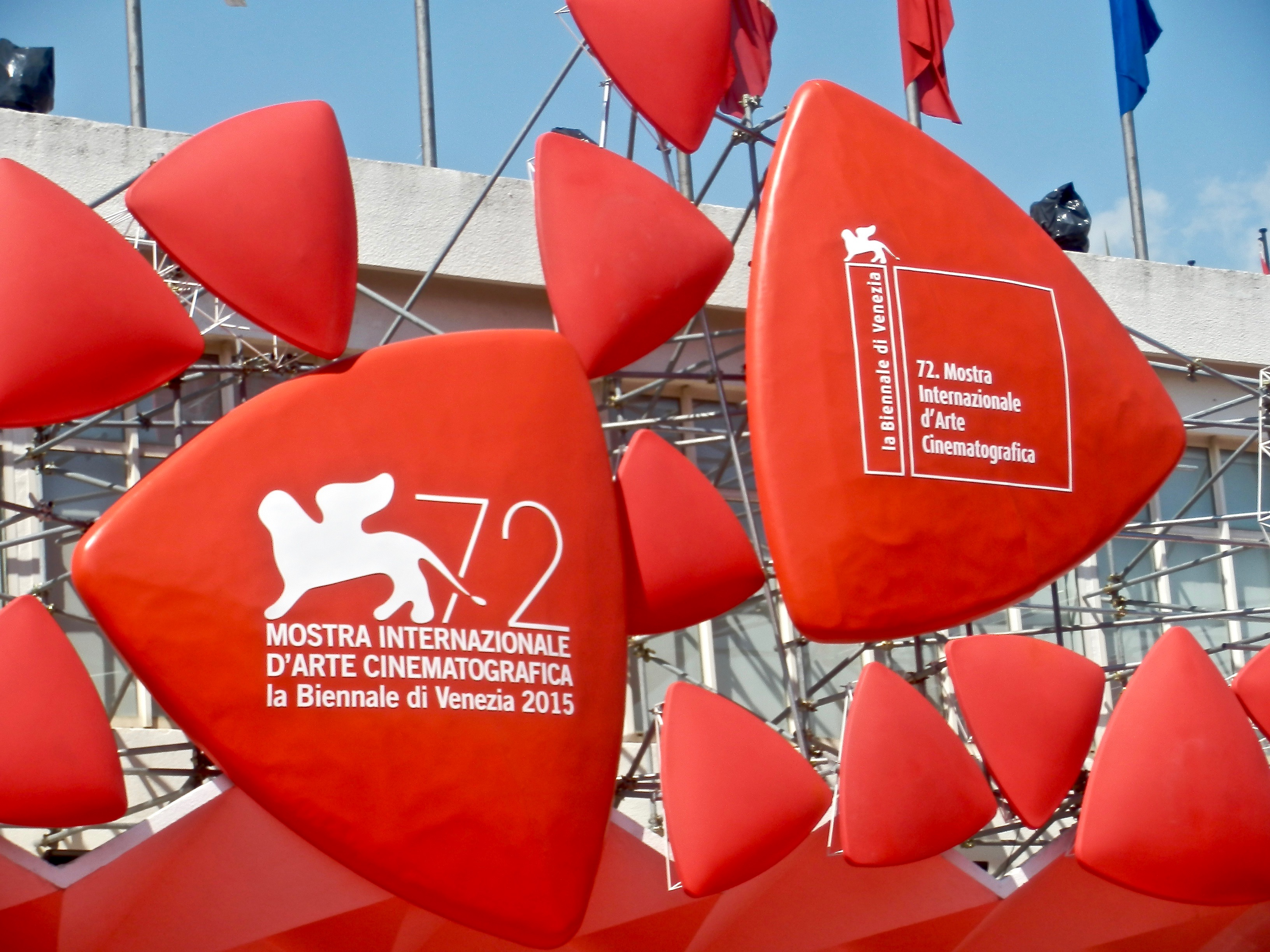
72nd Venice International Film Festival

The 72nd annual Venice International Film Festival, was held from 2 to 12 September 2015, at Venice Lido in Italy.

Mexican filmmaker Alfonso Cuarón was the jury president for the main competition. French-Italian actress Elisa Sednaoui hosted the opening and closing ceremonies of the festival. The Golden Lion was awarded to From Afar by Lorenzo Vigas.

The festival poster featured Nastassja Kinski in front as reminiscent of Wim Wenders's Faraway, So Close!, while in the background it featured the character of Antoine Doinel portrayed by Jean-Pierre Léaud from François Truffaut's 1959 drama film The 400 Blows, which also appeared on the 71st Venice International Film Festival poster.

The festival opened with Everest by Baltasar Kormákur, and closed with Mr. Six by Guan Hu.

== Juries ==
=== Main competition (Venezia 72) ===
- Alfonso Cuarón, Mexican filmmaker - Jury President
- Elizabeth Banks, American actress and director
- Emmanuel Carrère, French author, screenwriter and director
- Nuri Bilge Ceylan, Turkish director
- Hou Hsiao-hsien, Taiwanese filmmaker
- Diane Kruger, German actress
- Francesco Munzi, Italian director
- Paweł Pawlikowski, Polish filmmaker
- Lynne Ramsay, Scottish filmmaker

=== Horizons (Orizzonti) ===
- Jonathan Demme, American director - Jury President
- Alix Delaporte, French director and screenwriter
- Fruit Chan, Hong Kong director
- Anita Caprioli, Italian actress
- Paz Vega, Spanish actress

=== Opera Prima (Venice Award for a Debut Film) ===
- Saverio Costanzo, Italian director - Jury President
- Charles Burnett, American director
- Roger Garcia, Hong Kong producer
- Natacha Laurent, French film critic and historian
- Daniela Michel, Mexican journalist

== Official Sections ==
=== In Competition ===
The following films were selected for the main competition:

English title	Original title	Director(s)	Production country
11 Minutes	11 minut	Jerzy Skolimowski	Poland, Ireland
Anomalisa		Charlie Kaufman and Duke Johnson	United States
Beasts of No Nation		Cary Joji Fukunaga	United States
Behemoth	悲兮魔兽	Zhao Liang	China
A Bigger Splash		Luca Guadagnino	Italy, France
Blood of My Blood	Sangue del mio sangue	Marco Bellocchio	Italy
The Clan	El Clan	Pablo Trapero	Argentina, Spain
Courted	L'Hermine	Christian Vincent	France
The Danish Girl		Tom Hooper	United Kingdom, United States
The Endless River		Oliver Hermanus	South Africa, France
Equals		Drake Doremus	United States
Per amor vostro		Giuseppe M. Gaudino	Italy, France
Francofonia		Alexander Sokurov	France, Germany, Netherlands
Frenzy	Abluka	Emin Alper	Turkey, France, Qatar
From Afar	Desde allá	Lorenzo Vigas	Venezuela
Heart of a Dog		Laurie Anderson	United States
Looking for Grace		Sue Brooks	Australia
Marguerite		Xavier Giannoli	France, Czech Republic, Belgium
Rabin, the Last Day		Amos Gitai	Israel, France
Remember		Atom Egoyan	Canada, Germany
The Wait	L'attesa	Piero Messina	Italy, France

=== Out of Competition ===
The following films were selected to be screened out of competition:

English title	Original title	Director(s)	Production country
Fiction
Afternoon	那日下午	Tsai Ming-liang	Taiwan
Black Mass		Scott Cooper	United States
Bleak Street	La calle de la Amargura	Arturo Ripstein	Mexico, Spain
Don't Be Bad	Non essere cattivo	Claudio Caligari	Italy
Everest (opening film)		Baltasar Kormákur	United Kingdom, United States, Iceland
Blackway	Go with Me	Daniel Alfredson	Canada, United States, Sweden
Mr. Six (closing film)	老炮儿	Guan Hu	China
Spotlight		Tom McCarthy	United States
Non Fiction
De Palma		Noah Baumbach and Jake Paltrow	United States
L'esercito piu piccolo del mondo		Gianfranco Pannone	Vatican, Italy
The Event	Событие	Sergei Loznitsa	Netherlands, Belgium
I ricordi del fiume		Gianluca De Serio, Massimiliano De Serio	Italy
In Jackson Heights		Frederick Wiseman	United States, France
Janis: Little Girl Blue		Amy J. Berg	United States
Gli uomini di questa città io non li conosco		Franco Maresco	Italy
Winter on Fire: Ukraine's Fight for Freedom	Зима у вогні: Боротьба України за свободу	Evgeny Afineevsky	Ukraine, United States, United Kingdom
Special Screening
Human		Yann Arthus-Bertrand	France

=== Orizzonti ===
The following feature films were selected for the Horizons (Orizzonti) section:

English title	Original title	Director(s)	Production country
In Competition
Burning Love	Pecore In Erba	Alberto Caviglia	Italy
The Childhood of a Leader		Brady Corbet	United States, United Kingdom, Hungary, Sweden, France, Canada, Belgium
A Copy of My Mind		Joko Anwar	Indonesia, South Korea
A War	Krigen	Tobias Lindholm	Denmark
Neon Bull	Boi Neon	Gabriel Mascaro	Brazil, Uruguay, Netherlands
Wednesday, May 9	چهارشنبه ۱۹ اردیبهشت	Vahid Jalilvand	Iran
Free in Deed		Jake Mahaffy	United States, New Zealand
Visaranai	விசாரணை	Vetrimaaran	India
Interruption		Yorgos Zois	Greece, France, Croatia
Italian Gangsters		Renato De Maria	Italy
Kill Me Please	Mate-Me Por Favor	Anita Rocha da Silveira	Brazil, Argentina
Land Legs	Tempête	Samuel Collardey	France
Madame Courage		Merzak Allouache	Algeria, France, United Arab Emirates
Man Down		Dito Montiel	United States
A Monster with a Thousand Heads	Un monstruo de mil cabezas	Rodrigo Plá	Mexico
Mountain	Ha'har	Yaelle Kayam	Israel
Taj Mahal		Nicolas Saada	France, Belgium
Tharlo	塔洛	Pema Tseden	China
Why Hast Thou Forsaken Me	Lama Azavtani	Hadar Morag	Israel, France
Short Films - Competition
55 Pills	55 Pastillas	Sebastián Muro	Argentina
Backyards	Dvorišta	Ivan Salatic	Montenegro
Chatting		Lonce Marlonce	Singapore
Champ des possibles		Cristina Picchi	Canada
En defensa Propia		Mariana Arriaga	Mexico
E.T.E.R.N.I.T.		Giovanni Aloi	France
It Seems to Hang on		Kevin Jerome Everson	United States
Monkey	Hou	Jie Shen	China
New Eyes		Hiwot Admasu Getaneh	France, Germany, United Kingdom
Oh Gallow Lay		Julian Wayser	United States
Tarântula		Aly Muritiba, Marja Calafanje	Brazil
Violences en Réunion		Karim Boukercha	France
The Young Man Who Came from the Chee River	Jer gun muer rao jer gun	Wichanon Somunjarn	Thailand
Short Films - Out of Competition
Zero		David Victori	United States, United Kingdom, Spain, Mexico

=== Venice Classics ===
The following selection of restored classic films and documentaries on cinema were screened for this section:

English title	Original title	Director(s)	Production country
Restored Films
Alexander Nevsky (1938)	Александр Невский	Sergei Eisenstein	Soviet Union
Amarcord (1973)		Federico Fellini	Italy
Le Beau Serge (1958)		Claude Chabrol	France
The Boys from Fengkuei (1983)	風櫃來的人	Hou Hsiao-hsien	Taiwan
Hardly a Criminal (1949)	Apenas un delincuente	Hugo Fregonese	Argentina
Heaven Can Wait (1943)		Ernst Lubitsch	United States
Léon Morin, Priest (1961)	Léon Morin, prêtre	Jean-Pierre Melville	France
La lupa (1953)		Alberto Lattuada	Italy
A Matter of Life and Death (1946)		Michael Powell & Emeric Pressburger	United Kingdom
The Merchant of Venice (1969)		Orson Welles	United States
I Mostri (aka Opiate '67, 1963)		Dino Risi	Italy
Othello (1951)	The Tragedy of Othello: The Moor of Venice	Orson Welles	Italy, France, United States
The Power and the Glory (1933)		William K. Howard	United States
Ray of Sunshine (1933)	Sonnenstrahl	Paul Fejos	Germany, Austria
Red Beard (1965)	赤ひげ	Akira Kurosawa	Japan
Salò, or the 120 Days of Sodom (1975)	Salò o le 120 giornate di Sodoma	Pier Paolo Pasolini	Italy
The Thirsty One (1957)	प्यासा / Pyaasa	Guru Dutt	India
To Sleep with Anger (1990)		Charles Burnett	United States
The Trial of Vivienne Ware (1932)		William K. Howard	United States
Umut (1970)		Yilmaz Güney	Turkey
We Want the Colonels (1973)	Vogliamo i colonnelli	Mario Monicelli	Italy
White Paws (1949)	Pattes blanches	Jean Grémillon	France
Documentaries about cinema
The 1000 Eyes of Dr. Maddin		Yves Montmayeur	France
Alfredo Bini, the Unexpected Guest	Alfredo Bini, ospite inatteso	Simone Isola	Italy
Behind the White Glasses	Dietro gli occhiali bianchi	Valerio Ruiz	Italy
A Flickering Truth		Pietra Brettkelly	New Zealand, Afghanistan
For the Love of a Man		Rinku Kalsy	India
Helmut Berger, Actor		Andreas Horvath	Austria
Jacques Tourneur le médium: filmer l'invisible		Alain Mazars	France
Mifune: The Last Samurai		Steven Okazaki	Japan
Venise (1912)		(Unknown)	France

=== Biennale College - Cinema ===
The following films were screened for the "Biennale College - Cinema" section, a higher education training workshop for micro-budget feature films:

English title	Original title	Director(s)	Production country
Baby Bump		Kuba Czekaj	Poland
Blanka		Kohki Hasei	Japan, Italy
The Fits		Anna Rose Holmer	United States

=== Final Cut in Venice ===
The following films were screened for the "Final Cut in Venice" section, a workshop to support the post-production of films from Africa:

English title	Original title	Director(s)	Production country
Ali, the Goat, and Ibrahim	Ali Mea'za We Ibrahim	Sherif Elbendary	Egypt
House in the Fields	Tigmi Nigren	Tala Hadid	Morocco
Path of Paradise	Tarik Al-Jenah	Atia Al-Daradji	Iraq
Rooster of Beirut	Deek Beirut	Ziad Kalthoum	Syria
Separation	Havibon	Hakar Abdulqadir	Iraq
Zaineb Hates the Snow	Zaineb Takrahou Ethelj	Kaouther Ben Hania	Tunisia

=== Il Cinema nel Giardino ===
The following feature films were selected for the Il Cinema nel Giardino section:

Screening	Title	Director(s)	Production country
3 Sep	Carlo Lizzani, Il mio cinema	Roberto Torelli, Cristina Torelli, Paolo Luciani	Italy
6 Sep	Al centro del cinema	Gianandrea Caruso, Chiara Dainese, Davide Minotti, Bernardo Pellegrini, Maria Tilli	Italy
8 Sep	ZAC - I Fiori del MALE	Massimo Denaro	Italy
9 Sep	Torn (Torn - Strappati)	Alessandro Gassmann	Italy
10 Sep	Where is the Goldfish? (Il pesce rosso dov'è?)	Elisabetta Sgarbi	Italy
11 Sep	Il decalogo di Vasco	Fabio Masi	Italy

== Independent Sections ==
=== International Critics’ Week ===
The following films were selected for the 29th Venice International Film Critics' Week:

English title	Original title	Director(s)	Production country
In competition
Banat (The Journey)	Banat	Adriano Valerio	Italy, Romania, Bulgaria, Macedonia
Kalo Pothi: The Black Hen	Kalo Pothi	Min Bahadur Bham	Nepal, France, Germany
Light Years		Esther May Campbell	United Kingdom
Mountain	Montanha	João Salaviza	Portugal, France
Motherland	Ana Yurdu	Senem Tüzen	Turkey, Greece
The Return		Green Zeng	Singapore
Tanna		Martin Butler	Australia
Special Events - Out of competition
The Family (Pre-Opening)	Jia	Shumin Liu	China, Australia
Orphans (Opening Film)		Peter Mullan	United Kingdom
Bagnoli Jungle (Closing Film)		Antonio Capuano	Italy

=== Venice Days ===
The following films were selected for the 12th edition of the Venice Days (Giornate degli Autori) section:

English title	Original title	Director(s)	Production country
In Competition
Arianna		Carlo Lavagna	Italy
As I Open My Eyes	À peine j'ouvre les yeux	Leyla Bouzid	France, Tunisia, Belgium, United Arab Emirates
The Daughter		Simon Stone	Australia
Early Winter		Michael Rowe	Australia, Canada
First Light	La prima luce	Vincenzo Marra	Italy
Island City		Ruchika Oberoi	India
Klezmer		Piotr Chrzan	Poland
Lolo		Julie Delpy	France
Long Live the Bride	Viva la sposa	Ascanio Celestini	Italy, France, Belgium
The Memory of Water	La memoria del agua	Matías Bize	Chile, Spain, Argentina, Germany
Retribution	El desconocido	Dani de la Torre	Spain
Underground Fragrance		Pengfei	France, China
Special events
Argentina	Zonda, folclore argentino	Carlos Saura	Argentina, Spain, France
Harry's Bar		Carlotta Cerquetti	Italy
Innocence of Memories - Orhan Pamuk's Museum and Istanbul		Grant Gee	United Kingdom, Ireland, Italy
Ma		Celia Rowlson-Hall	United States
Milano 2015		Elio, Roberto Bolle, Silvio Soldini, Walter Veltroni, Cristiana Capotondi, Giorgio Diritti	Italy
Viva Ingrid!		Alessandro Rossellini	Italy
Miu Miu Women's Tales
Les 3 Boutons		Agnès Varda	France, Italy
De Djess		Alice Rohrwacher	Italy
Special projects
Bangland		Lorenzo Berghella	Italy
The Country Where Trees Fly. Eugenio Barba and the Days of Odin	Il paese dove gli alberi volano. Eugenio Barba e i giorni dell'Odin	Davide Barletti, Jacopo Quadri	Italy
Dreams of the Salt Lake	I sogni del lago salato	Andrea Segre	Italy
Lux Prize
Mediterranea		Jonas Carpignano	Italy, United States, Germany, France, Qatar
Mustang		Deniz Gamze Ergüven	France, Germany, Turkey, Qatar
The Lesson	Urok	Kristina Grozeva, Petar Valchanov	Bulgaria, Greece

== Official Awards ==
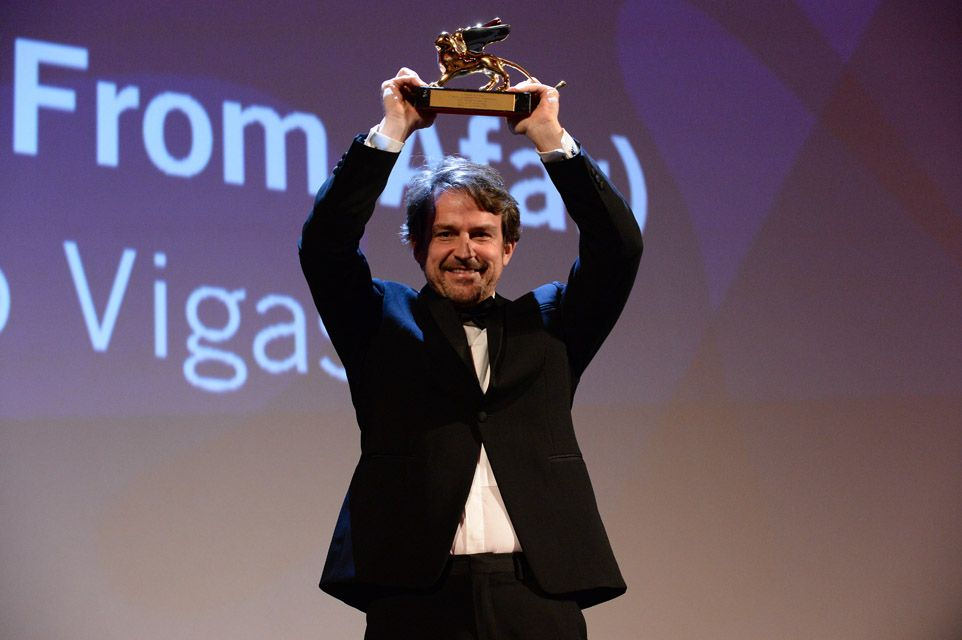
Lorenzo Vigas with the Golden Lion for From Afar

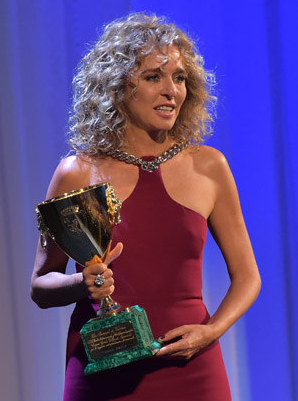
Valeria Golino, winner of the Coppa Volpi

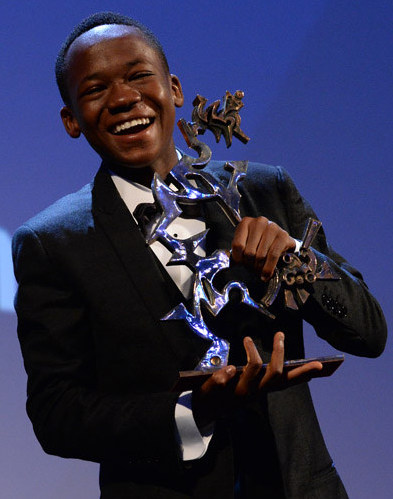
Abraham Attah, winner of the Marcello Mastroianni Award

=== In Competition (Venezia 72) ===
- Golden Lion: From Afar by Lorenzo Vigas
- Silver Lion for Best Director: Pablo Trapero for The Clan
- Grand Jury Prize: Anomalisa by Charlie Kaufman and Duke Johnson
- Volpi Cup for Best Actor: Fabrice Luchini for Courted
- Volpi Cup for Best Actress: Valeria Golino for Per amor vostro
- Marcello Mastroianni Award: Abraham Attah for Beasts of No Nation
- Best Screenplay: Christian Vincent for Courted
- Special Jury Prize: Frenzy by Emin Alper

=== Golden Lion for Lifetime Achievement ===
- Bertrand Tavernier

=== Orizzonti ===
- Best Film: Free in Deed by Jake Mahaffy
- Best Director: Brady Corbet for The Childhood of a Leader
- Special Jury Prize: Neon Bull by Gabriel Mascaro
- Special Prize For Best Actor or Actress: Dominique Leborne for Tempête
- Horizons Prize for Best Short: Belladonna by Dubravka Turic

=== Luigi De Laurentis Award for a Debut Film ===
- The Childhood of a Leader by Brady Corbet

=== Venice Classics Awards ===
- Best Documentary on Cinema: The 1000 Eyes of Dr. Maddin by Yves Montmayeur
- Best Restored Film: Salò, or the 120 Days of Sodom by Pier Paolo Pasolini

=== Special awards ===
- Jaeger-LeCoultre Glory to the Filmmaker Award: Brian De Palma
- Persol Tribute To Visionary Talent Award: Jonathan Demme
- L'Oréal Paris per il Cinema Award: Valentina Corti

== Independent Sections Awards ==
The following official and collateral awards were conferred to films of the autonomous sections:

=== 30th Venice International Critics' Week ===
- Audience Award Pietro Barzisa: Tanna by Bentley Dean and Martin Butler

=== Venice Days ===
- Venice Days Award: Early Winter by Michael Rowe
- BNL People's Choice Award: As I Open My Eyes by Leyla Bouzid
- Europa Cinemas Label Award for Best European Film: As I Open My Eyes by Leyla Bouzid
- Laguna Sud Award
  - Best Film: Lolo by Jullie Delpy
  - Best Italian Discovery: Arianna by Carlo Lavagna

=== Francesco Pasinetti (SNGCI) Award - Special mentions ===
- First Light by Vincenzo Marra
- Vincenzo Marra (director) and Riccardo Scamarcio (leading actor) for First Light

== Independent Awards ==
The following collateral awards were conferred to films of the official selection:

=== FIPRESCI Awards ===
- Best Film (Main competition): Blood of My Blood by Marco Bellocchio
- Best Film (Horizons): Wednesday, 9 May by Vahid Jalilvand
  - Special mention: The Childhood of a Leader by Brady Corbet

=== SIGNIS Award ===
- Behemoth by Zhao Liang
  - Special mention: The Wait by Piero Messina

=== Francesco Pasinetti (SNGCI) Award ===
- Best Film: Don't Be Bad by Claudio Caligari
- Best Actor: Luca Marinelli for Don't Be Bad
- Best Actress: Valeria Golino for For Your Love

=== Leoncino d'Oro Agiscuola Award ===
- The Wait by Piero Messina

=== Brian Award ===
- Spotlight by Tom McCarthy

=== Queer Lion ===
- The Danish Girl by Tom Hooper
  - Special mention: Baby Bump by Kuba Czekaj

=== Arca CinemaGiovani Award ===
- Best Film of Venezia 72: Frenzy by Emin Alper
- Best Italian Film: Burning Love by Albert Caviglia

=== FEDIC Award ===
- Don't Be Bad directed by Claudio Caligari
  - Special mention: The Wait by Piero Messina

=== Fedeora Awards ===
- Best Film (Critics' Week): The Black Hen by Min Bahadur Bham
- Best Cinematography (Critics' Week): Bentley Dean for Tanna
- Best Film (Venice Days): Underground Fragrance by Pengfei
- Best Director of a Debut Film (Venice Days): Ruchika Oberoi for Island City
- Best Actress in a Debut Film (Venice Days): Ondina Quadri for Arianna
- Best Euro-Mediterranean film: Francofonia by Alexander Sokurov

=== Fondazione Mimmo Rotella Award ===
- Alexander Sokurov for Francofonia
  - Special Award: Johnny Depp and Terry Gilliam

=== 2nd Starlight Cinema Awards ===
- Career Award: Lina Wertmuller
- International Award: Paz Vega
- Best Film: Matteo Garrone's Tale of Tales
- Best breakthrough actress of the year: Silvia D’Amico
- Best breakthrough actor of the year: Giovanni Anzaldo
- Humanitarian Award: Myriam Catania
- Special Mention: Lucana Film Commission
- Best breakthrough production: Buena Onda by Riccardo Scamarcio
- Intercultural Award: Reynaldo Gianecchini

=== Green Drop Award ===
- Behemoth by Zhao Liang

=== Vittorio Veneto Film Festival Young Jury award ===
- Remember by Atom Egoyan
  - Special mention: 11 Minutes by Jerzy Skolimowski

=== Gold Mouse ===
- Rabin, the Last Day by Amos Gitai
- Silver Mouse: Spotlight by Tom McCarthy

=== Future Film Festival Digital Award ===
- Anomalisa by Charlie Kaufman and Duke Johnson
  - Special mention: Heart of a Dog by Laurie Anderson

=== P. Nazareno Taddei Award ===
- Marguèrite by Xavier Giannoli

=== Lanterna Magica (CGS) Award ===
- Blanka by Kohki Hasei

=== Open Award ===
- Carlotta Cerquetti for Harry’s Bar

=== Lina Mangiacapre Award ===
- Laurie Anderson for Heart of a Dog

=== Gillo Pontecorvo - Arcobaleno Latino Award ===
- Don't Be Bad by Claudio Caligari

=== INTERFILM Award ===
- Wednesday, 9 May by Vahid Jalilvand

=== "Civitas Vitae prossima" Award ===
- Alberto Caviglia for Pecore in erba

=== Soundtrack Stars Award ===
- A Bigger Splash by Luca Guadagnino
- Equals by Drake Doremus
- Award for Lifetime Achievement: Nicola Piovani

=== Schermi di Qualità – Carlo Mazzacurati Award ===
- Don't Be Bad by Claudio Caligari

=== Human Rights Nights Award ===
- Rabin, the Last Day by Amos Gitai

=== AssoMusica "Ho visto una Canzone" Award ===
- The song "A cuor leggero" by Riccardo Sinigallia, from the film Don't Be Bad

=== Sorriso diverso Venezia 2015 Award ===
- Best Italian film: Don't Be Bad by Claudio Caligari
- Best Film in a Foreign Language: Blanka by Kohki Hasei

=== Amnesty International Italia "Il cinema per i diritti umani" Award ===
- Visaranai by Vetrimaaran

=== CITC – UNESCO 2015 Award ===
- Beasts of No Nation by Cary Fukunaga

=== NuovoImaie Talent Award ===
- Best Actress in a Debut Film: Ondina Quadri for Arianna
- Best Italian actor in a Debut Film: Alessandro Borghi for Don't Be Bad

=== Best Innovative Budget Award ===
- A Bigger Splash by Luca Guadagnino
