= Together (2010 film) =

- Film poster
- Chinese: 在一起
- Directed by: Zhao Liang
- Starring: Aaron Kwok, Ziyi Zhang
- Production company: Hing Lung World Wide Group
- Release date: December 1, 2010
- Running time: 83 minutes
- Country: China

Together (Chinese: 在一起) is a 2010 Chinese film directed by Zhao Liang. It was filmed beside the Chinese film Love for Life, and chronicles the everyday lives of a variety of different people living in China with HIV/AIDS. The film depicts the living conditions of those living with HIV in China, as well as their own personal thoughts on their disease. Together, like the film Love for Life, was commissioned by the Ministry of Health and backed by the Chinese government. Zhao Liang has been seen as a rebel director, producing documentaries that expose the Chinese government of wrongdoing. For instance, his documentary Petition focused on mistreatment of Chinese by local authorities and government officials. Unlike his previous works, Together was made with the Chinese government and was censored, without mention of the mishandling of the HIV/AIDS epidemic in the 1990s and the cover-up by the government. Instead, the documentary focuses more on the actual lives of individuals with HIV/AIDS instead of touching on the past blood-sharing scandal in villages.

== Plot ==
The documentary Together begins on the set of the film, with Zhao Liang asking cast members and crew about their opinions on HIV/AIDS. Liang also reveals to cast members and those working on the film that there are cast members who have HIV/AIDS. This revelation receives mixed reactions from the crew, demonstrating a lasting stigma around the disease despite working on a film to promote awareness on HIV/AIDS. Liang also follows actors from the film and extras who have the diagnosis and uses the documentary to let these individuals both share their stories and offer insight to the disease and the effect on their lives and relationships with others. For instance, it is revealed in the documentary that Hu Zetao, who plays the narrator in the film Love for Life, has HIV/AIDS. The documentary looks closely at Zetao's life and relationships with family members; The Lancet noted in 2011 that of the participants in the film, Zetao, who contracted the virus from his mother, was the least isolated by his diagnosis. In fact, most of the participants asked that their identities remain secret.

== Themes ==
The documentary Together showcases the stories of individuals living with HIV in a modern-day society, whereas the film Love for Life is based on a fictional story about the 1990s blood-selling practice in rural villages. While Love for Life showcases an emotional story between two HIV positive individuals, Together focuses on the burden and stigma within present society and desire to be seen as normal individuals. Together provides information about the government and also details modes of transmission through the stories, focusing on mother-to-child transmission and blood transfusion than through more scandalous methods such as through sex work or sharing needles for drug use. Overall, Together is a documentary that looks at the stigma that still exists within China while also promoting the efforts of the government to reduce stigma and control the continuation of the HIV/AIDS epidemic.

Within the documentary, the stigma within Zetao's own family is shown. Specifically, he is unable to dip his chopsticks into the communal hotpot and is given his own utensils and bowls that he must wash separately. His family fears contracting the disease from Zetao, leading to isolation from his family. In addition to following actors and extras from the film Love for Life, Liang also reaches out to many people within China through chat rooms. Liang joins an online chat room specifically for individuals with HIV and AIDS and asks about their stories and willingness to be filmed for the documentary. While many are hesitant to film, the few who do agree have their identities protected and share how they contracted the disease, who knows of their status among family and friends, and the stigma that the diagnosis has in the modern day. From the interviews and minimal response, it is clear that there is still a fear of being open about such a diagnosis. “A big reason we don't stand up," explained one participant known only as Invisible Angel, "is because people don't identify with us. People think that only drug users or promiscuous and morally depraved people get AIDS.” Additionally, within the interviews a common theme is fear of telling family members out of fear of isolation, rejection or shame. One individual details how she had planned to kill both herself and her son due to their HIV positive statuses and lack of desire to live in a society where their status is seen as a burden and impeding relationships with others.

== Reception ==
=== Critical response ===
Together was filmed beside Love for Life, marking the first time the blood selling scandal of the 1990s had been featured in mainstream Chinese media. More still, the Chinese government backed the film, and used it as a way to advocate public health information on HIV/AIDS, and the living condition and social impact it has on those who contract it.

=== Selections ===
2010

- 61st Berlin International Film Festival, Germany
- 35th Hong Kong International Film Festival, Hong Kong
