= Petition (disambiguation) =

A petition is a written request to the government for action.

Petition may also refer to:

- Petition (film), a 2009 Chinese documentary by Zhao Liang
- Petition (horse) (1944–1964), a British Thoroughbred racehorse

== See also ==
- Category:Petitions
- Petitioner, a legal party who pleads through use of a petition
- Supplication or petitioning, a form of prayer
