= Libiszewski =

Libiszewski, known femininely as Libiszewska, is a surname. Notable people with the surname include:

- Fabien Libiszewski (born 1984), French chess grandmaster and actor
- Herbert Libiszewski (1897–1985), Swiss graphic artist, illustrator, embroidery designer, poster artist and painter
