= Oswaldo Vigas =

Venezuelan painter and muralist (1923–2014)

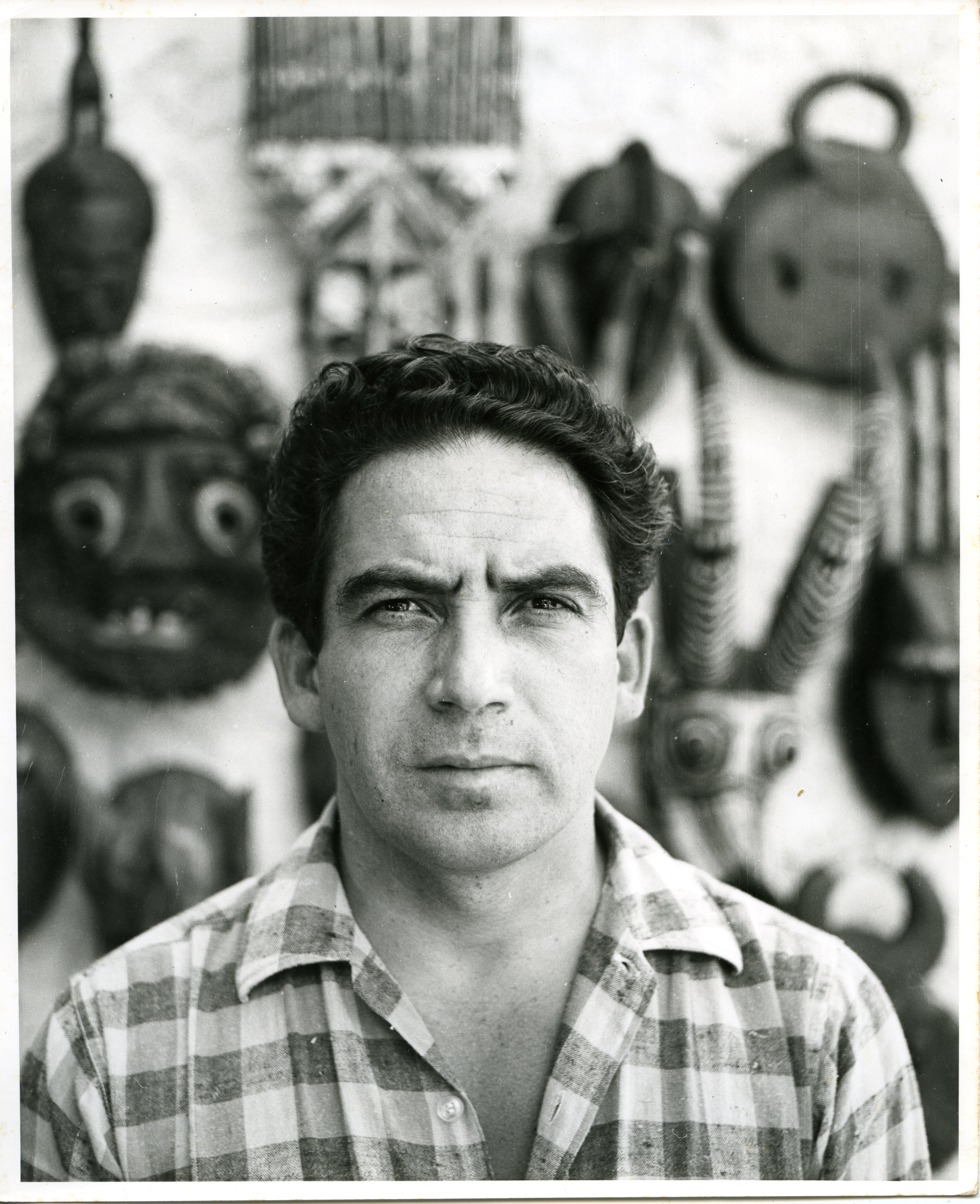
- Oswaldo Vigas. Mérida, Venezuela, 1966
- Born: August 4, 1923; Valencia, Carabobo, Venezuela
- Died: April 22, 2014 (aged 90); Caracas, Capital District, Venezuela
- Education: Universidad de los Andes; École des Beaux-Arts, Sorbonne
- Alma mater: Universidad Central de Venezuela
- Movement: Late Modernism

Oswaldo Vigas (August 4, 1923 – April 22, 2014) was a Venezuelan artist who worked as a painter, muralist, and sculptor. His body of work encompassed paintings, prints, drawings, ceramics, and tapestries. He integrated pre-Columbian with modernist and contemporary artistic currents. He lived and worked in France and Venezuela.

== Early life and education ==
Oswaldo Vigas was born on August 4, 1923 in Valencia, Carabobo, Venezuela. He identified as mestizo, reflecting mixed Indigenous and Spanish ancestry. After the death of his father, Vigas started painting and learned how to paint the human body at the age of 12.

He studied medicine at the University of the Andes (Spanish: Universidad de los Andes) in Mérida, Venezuela and the Central University of Venezuela (Spanish: Universidad Central de Venezuela) in Caracas. He earned his medical degree in 1951. While studying, he took art classes at the Taller Libre de Artes and the Escuela de Artes Plásticas Cristóbal Rojas. During this time, Vigas became acquainted with painters including Manuel Cabré and Pedro Ángel González.

Vigas enrolled at the École des Beaux-Arts in 1953, where he studied etching under Marcel Jaudon and lithography under Stanley William Hayter.

== Work ==
Vigas' early paintings focused on the female form, and he often returned to the theme of witches (brujas) throughout his career. He also became interested in pre-Columbian culture and pottery, specifically Venus de Tacarigua figurines.

Vigas's witch paintings were awarded three art prizes in Venezuela. He won the National Visual Arts Award in 1952 for his painting La gran bruja (1951) and had a solo exhibition at the Museo de Bellas Artes in Caracas. Following this recognition, Vigas moved to Paris in 1952.

=== Paris ===
Vigas lived in Paris for twelve years, where he met his wife Janine and was associated with Fernand Léger, Max Ernst, and Wifredo Lam.

During most of the 1950s, his work shifted away from the human figure and toward constructivism and abstraction. Between 1953 and 1958, Vigas exhibited regularly in France and Venezuela.

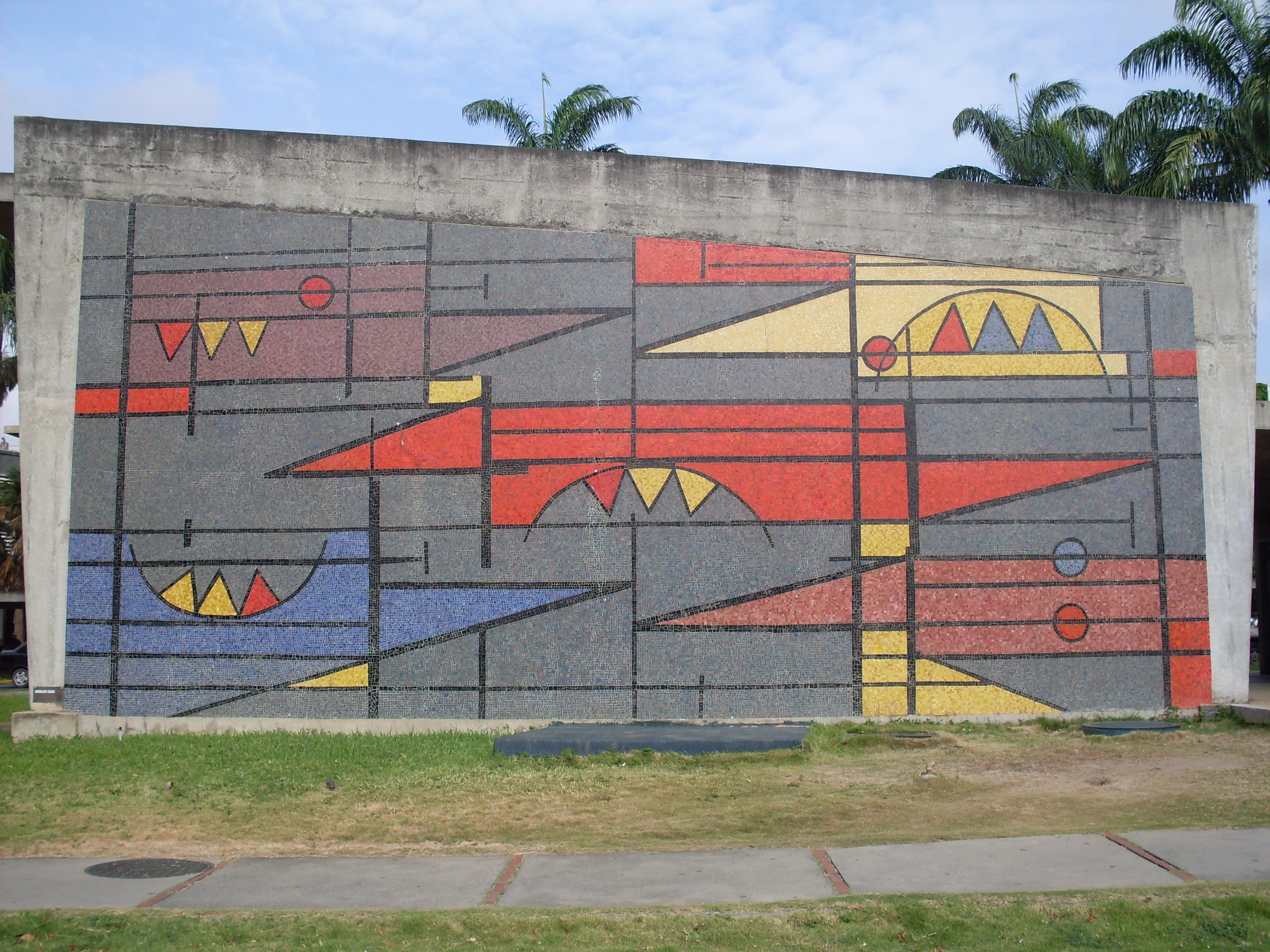
Title: Un elemento-personaje vertical en evolución horizontal. One of 5 murals completed by Oswaldo Vigas in 1954 at the Universidad Central de Venezuela.

In 1953, he participated in the São Paulo Biennial and in a group show at the Musée d’Art Moderne de la Ville de Paris, among other exhibitions. He also received a commission for five mosaic murals at the Universidad Central de Venezuela, which was designated a World Heritage Site by UNESCO in 2000.

In 1954, he was the first artist to represent Venezuela at the XXVII Venice Biennale. In the same year, he was part of the Painters of Venezuela traveling exhibition at the Pan-American Union, organised by the Museo de Bellas Artes.

During the late 1950s to mid-1960s, while still in France, Vigas was invited to participate in a survey of Latin American art in which he received first prize: the Gulf-Caribbean Art Exhibition, curated by Lee Malone at the Museum of Fine Arts, Houston.

Vigas also had exhibitions at the Slater Memorial Museum of Norwich, Connecticut and the University of Nebraska Art Gallery, and participated in the Contemporary Drawings from Latin America exhibition at the Pan-American Union in Washington, D.C. He was included in another large survey exhibition, South American Art Today, curated by José Gómez Sicre at the Dallas Museum of Fine Art.

After visiting Pablo Picasso in 1955, features commonly found in pre-Columbian art, particularly stylized faces, began to appear in Vigas’s paintings.

During the 1950s, Vigas became interested in anthropology and the early cultures of the Americas. He developed a personal approach that combined gestural, geometric and figurative work. He later looked to early cultures as a way to explore personal identity, using symbols and imagery drawn from nature and myth, which is shown in his work from the 1960s onward.

In 1964, he moved back to Valencia, Venezuela and continued to exhibit his work throughout the country. In 1967, his son Lorenzo was born, and in 1970, he relocated to Caracas.

=== Venezuela ===
During the early 1960s, Vigas explored informalism, using thick black lines to portray the figure through abstract volumes and shapes. Upon his return to Venezuela, he was named Cultural Director of the Universidad de Los Andes (ULA) in Mérida and simultaneously appointed Artistic Director of the Instituto Nacional de Cultura y Bellas Artes (INCIBA) in Caracas. In his roles as Cultural Director and Artistic Director, Vigas promoted the creation of national salons and awards to help Venezuelan artists. He held both positions until 1972.

From the mid-1960s onwards, Vigas' work progressively shifted from informalism to a new figurative phase.

During the 1980s, Vigas produced a series of tapestries and ceramic works, as well as his first bronze-cast sculptures.

In 1990, the Museo de Arte Contemporáneo de Caracas Sofía Imber organised a major retrospective of his works, showcasing paintings, sculptures, tapestries, ceramics and jewellery.

In 1992, the city of Monte Carlo honoured him with the Prince Rainier Grand Prize, and the Monnaie de Paris organised a retrospective from 1952 to 1993 showcasing one hundred and thirty-two works comprising paintings, ceramics and sculptures.

In 2008, he was designated Commandeur de l’Ordre des Arts et des Lettres de France.

During his later years, Vigas continued to work and exhibit worldwide. In 2012, he was invited to participate in the ''Un Coeur, un Monde'' group show that travelled through France, the United States, Vietnam, Australia, Brazil and Japan. He was also invited to exhibit at the ''Latin American & Caribbean Contemporary Art Today'' survey at the Miura Museum of Art, Tokyo.

== Death and legacy ==
Vigas died on April 22, 2014, in Caracas, at the age of 90. He was survived by his wife, Janine Vigas, and their son filmmaker Lorenzo. His son, the filmmaker Lorenzo Vigas, won the Golden Lion for best film of the 2015 Venice Film Festival with his first feature film, From Afar.

Lagoven, the oil company and subsidiary of PDVSA, produced a documentary film about his work in 2016.

The Oswaldo Vigas Foundation (Fundación Oswaldo Vigas) was created to expand his art legacy worldwide. A retrospective Oswaldo Vigas Antológica: 1943–2013 premiered at the Museum of Contemporary Art, Lima, before traveling to the National Museum of Fine Arts, Santiago, and subsequently to Museo de Arte Moderno, Bogotá in July 2015.

== Awards and honors ==
Vigas received a Doctor Honoris Causa degree from the Universidad de Los Andes in 1999, and from the Universidad Gran Mariscal de Ayacucho (UGMA), in Barcelona, Venezuela.

Vigas received the International Association of Art Critics Award twice, in 2008 and 2014. In 2004, he received the Latin Union Award in Washington, DC.

== Exhibitions ==
=== Solo exhibitions ===
A major retrospective of Vigas' work travelled throughout the Americas. The first instalment of Oswaldo Vigas Anthological: 1943- 2013 was held at the Museum of Contemporary Art in Lima, Peru; the show then travelled to the National Museum of Fine Arts in Santiago, Chile, and it will open in Bogotá, Colombia, in July 2015.

This is a listing of select exhibitions of Vigas.

Year	Title	Location	Notes
2019	Oswaldo Vigas: Transformations	Tampa Museum of Art, Tampa, Florida, United States	
2018	Oswaldo Vigas: Transformations	Grand Rapids Art Museum, Grand Rapids, Michigan, United States	
2016	Oswaldo Vigas Antológica 1943–2013	Museum of Contemporary Art at the University of São Paulo (Museu de Arte Contemporânea), São Paulo, Brazil	
2015	Oswaldo Vigas Antológica 1943–2013	Museo Nacional de Bellas Artes, Santiago, Chile	
2015	Donación Oswaldo Vigas	Museo Jean Lurçat et de la Tapisserie Contemporaine (Jean-Lurçat Museum and Contemporary Tapestry), Angers, France	
2014	Oswaldo Vigas: transfigurations	Dillon Gallery, New York, New York, United States	
2014	Homenaje a Oswaldo Vigas	Galería de Arte Nacional, Caracas, Venezuela	
2014	Oswaldo Vigas Antológica 1943–2013	Museum of Contemporary Art, Lima, Peru	
2014	Oswaldo Vigas Antológica 1943–2013	Museo de Arte Moderno, Bogotá, Colombia	This was the first location of the traveling exhibition.
2012	El dibujo en la obra de Oswaldo Vigas, 1940-2012	Gabinete del Dibujo y la Estampa de Valencia, Venezuela.	Retrospective exhibition that included 100 works.
2012	Feria Iberoamericana de Arte de Caracas, FIA 2012	Galería de Arte Ascaso, Galería Medicci and 700 Arte of Maracaibo.	
2012	Exposición de arte iberoamericano	Madrid, Spain	Exhibition to mark of the celebration of the two hundred years of the establishment of the Supreme Court of Spain.
2011	Oswaldo Vigas. Mérida, Paris, Caracas. Peintures	Centre d´Art Villa Tamaris, La Seyne-sur-mer, France	Retrospective exhibition that included 170 works.
2011	Feria Iberoamericana de Arte de Caracas, FIA 2011	Galería de Arte Ascaso and Galería Medicci	
2010	Oswaldo Vigas. De brujas a curanderas	Parque Fernando Peñalver, Valencia, Carabobo, Venezuela	
2009	Mujeres, mujeres y mujeres, Alianza Francesa based in La Castellana	Caracas, Venezuela	
2009	Oswaldo Vigas en InterValores	InterValores, Chacao, Caracas, Venezuela	
2007	Oswaldo Vigas: pasión por la creación, (March)	Galería Corporación Andina de Fomento (CAF), Caracas, Venezuela	
2007	Tierra y fuego	Fundación Banco Provincial, Caracas, Venezuela	
2005	Oswaldo Vigas: grabados recientes	French Alliance (Alianza Francesa), Caracas, Venezuela	
2005	Oswaldo Vigas: sortilèges des tropiques	Museo Jean Lurçat et de la Tapisserie Contemporaine, Angers, France	
2004	Ideografías de Paris, 1952–1957, Oswaldo Vigas	Museo de Arte Contemporáneo del Zulia, Maracaibo, Venezuela	
2003	Oswaldo Vigas, recuerdos del presente	Galería de Arte Ascaso, Caracas, Venezuela	
2002	Ideografías de Paris, 1952–1957, Oswaldo Vigas	Tenji Gallery, Tokyo, Japan	
2002	Ideografías de Paris, 1952–1957, Oswaldo Vigas	Museo de Arte Contemporáneo de Caracas Sofía Imber, Caracas, Venezuela	
1998	Oswaldo Vigas, painting and sculpture	Aldo Castillo Gallery, Chicago, USA	
1997	Vigas en Maracaibo	Galería 700 Arte, Maracaibo, Venezuela	
1997	Oswaldo Vigas. Obras clave de 1952 a 1997	Comandancia General de la Aviación, Caracas, Venezuela	tribute of the Venezuelan Air Force to Oswaldo Vigas
1996	Oswaldo Vigas, un hombre americano	Casa de Las Américas, Havana, Cuba	
1995	Oswaldo Vigas. Mutants, pélélés, contorsionnistes et autres zigotos	Galerie La Tour des Cardinaux, L’Isle-sur-la-Sorgue, France	
1995	Oswaldo Vigas. La obra reciente	Grupo Li-Centro de Arte, Caracas, Venezuela	
1993	Vigas, de 1952 a 1993	Museum Monnaie de Paris, Paris, France	
1993	Oswaldo Vigas, la obra reciente	Grupo Li-Centro de Arte, Caracas, Venezuela	
1990	Retrospectiva Vigas: lo figurativo y lo telúrico	Museo de Arte Contemporáneo de Caracas Sofía Imber, Caracas, Venezuela	
1989	Ceremoniales	Centro Armitano Arte, Caracas, Venezuela	
1987	Paisajes andinos, with Marius Sznajderman	Galería Los Espacios Cálidos, Ateneo de Caracas, Venezuela	
1981	Tapicería de Oswaldo Vigas	Museo de Bellas Artes, Caracas, Venezuela	
1979	Antológica Ritos elementales, dioses oscuros	Instituto de Arte Panameño, Panama	
1979	Antológica Ritos elementales, dioses oscuros	Galería de Arte Nacional, Caracas Venezuela	
1977	Oswaldo Vigas, imagen de una identidad expresiva	Galería del Instituto Nacional de Cultura, Museo de Arte Italiano, Lima, Peru	
1973	Retrospectiva Oswaldo Vigas: 1943–1973,	Museo de Arte Contemporáneo de Bogotá, Bogotá, Colombia	
1970	Mitificaciones	Fundación Eugenio Mendoza, Caracas, Venezuela	
1970	Tapicerías	Galería Antañona, Caracas, Venezuela	
1967	Venezuelan witches	Galería del Banco Interamericano de Desarrollo, Washington, DC, United States	
1967	Vigas: pinturas 1965-1967	Fundación Eugenio Mendoza, Caracas, Venezuela	
1966	Retrospectiva Las brujas, árbol genealógico: 1941-1952	Galería 22, Caracas, Venezuela	
1964	Oswaldo Vigas: pinturas de los años 1960-1964	Fundación Eugenio Mendoza, Caracas, Venezuela	
1964	Vigas: grabados, dibujos, gouaches	Ateneo de Caracas, Caracas, Venezuela	
1964	Oswaldo Vigas: retrospectiva: 1941-1964	Ateneo de Valencia, Valencia, Venezuela	
1963	Vigas	Galería Neufville, Paris, France	
1961	Vigas, peintures récentes	Galerie La Roue, Paris, France	
1958	Oswaldo Vigas of Venezuela	Pan American Union, Washington, DC, United States	
1958	Blancos y negros	Fundación Eugenio Mendoza, Caracas, Venezuela	
1957		Museo de Arte Contemporáneo, Madrid, Spain	
1957	Oswaldo Vigas: 1953-1957	Fundación Eugenio Mendoza, Caracas, Venezuela	
1956	Blanc et noir	Galería La Roue, Paris, France	large-format drawings were on display
1952	Retrospectiva Oswaldo Vigas: 1946-1952	Museo de Bellas Artes, Caracas, Venezuela	
1942	Ateneo de Valencia	Valencia, Venezuela	first painting exhibition.

=== Group exhibitions ===
1953, 1954, 1955, 1956, 1957, 1961, 1963, 1978, 1980	Salon de Mai	Musée d’Art Moderne de la Ville de Paris, France

== Publications ==
- Oswaldo Vigas: antológica 1943 - 2013 (Exhibition catalog). Venezuela: Museo Nacional de Bellas Artes. 2015. ISBN 9789807690003.
- Oswaldo Vigas, Sortilèges des Tropiques: peintures, tapisseries, sculptures, céramiques 1950-2005 [Oswaldo Vigas, Charm of the Tropics: paintings, tapestries, sculptures, ceramics 1950 – 2005] (Exhibition catalog). Angers, France: Musée Jean Lurçat et de la Tapisserie Contemporaine. 2005. ISBN 9782901287902.
- Oswaldo Vigas: ideografías de París, 1952-1957 (Exhibition catalog). Caracas, Venezuela: Embajada de Francia in Venezuela, Museo de Arte Contemporáneo de Caracas, Museo de Arte Contemporáneo de Caracas Sofía Imber. 2002. ISBN 9789802722266.
