= Coup de Chance =

2023 film by Woody Allen

- French theatrical release poster
- Directed by: Woody Allen
- Written by: Woody Allen
- Produced by: Letty Aronson; Erika Aronson
- Starring: Lou de Laâge; Valérie Lemercier; Melvil Poupaud; Niels Schneider
- Cinematography: Vittorio Storaro
- Edited by: Alisa Lepselter
- Production companies: Gravier Productions; Dippermouth; Perdido Productions; Petite Fleur Productions
- Distributed by: Metropolitan Filmexport (France)
- Release dates: 4 September 2023 (Venice); 27 September 2023 (France); 5 April 2024 (United States)
- Running time: 93 minutes
- Countries: France; United Kingdom
- Language: French
- Budget: $12 million
- Box office: $7.8 million

Coup de Chance (lit. 'Stroke of Luck') is a 2023 French-language comedy drama thriller film written and directed by Woody Allen, in his French-language debut. Starring Lou de Laâge, Valérie Lemercier, Melvil Poupaud and Niels Schneider, it follows a young woman bumping into an old high school friend who confesses that he has always had a crush on her; their subsequent lunch meetings, in secret from her possessive businessman husband, lead slowly to a beginning of an affair.

The film had its world premiere out of competition at the 80th Venice International Film Festival on 4 September 2023, it received positive reviews from critics. It was theatrically released in France on 27 September 2023 by Metropolitan Filmexport. Coup de Chance was subsequently released in theaters in the United States on 5 April 2024 by MPI Media Group.

== Plot ==
Fanny and Jean have everything an ideal couple could want, except children. Fulfilled in their professional life, they live in a magnificent apartment in Paris and seem to be in love. But when Fanny bumps into former high school friend Alain, the situation becomes complicated. Seeing each other again seems to ignite old feelings. Alain, now a writer, makes no secret of the fact that he has always been in love with her. At the same time, during the social evenings of her husband, who in his profession "makes already rich people richer", she begins to question his profit motives.

Fanny and Alain abruptly launch themselves into an intense extramarital affair, to the point that she seems determined to leave her husband. Her husband becomes suspicious of subtle changes in her personality and contacts private investigators to find out if his wife has a lover. His fears confirmed, he decides to hire two hitmen to get rid of Alain.

After his murder, Fanny, no longer in touch with him and finding his apartment empty, becomes convinced that Alain has abandoned her due to her desire to leave her husband for him. She gets closer to her husband, with whom she plans to have a child.

Camille, Fanny's mother, however, learns of a former colleague of Jean who was found dead in mysterious circumstances. Although the matter had been dismissed as suicide, she remains suspicious. Even though her daughter doesn't believe her, Camille tries to convince her. Jean becomes aware of this and decides to have Fanny's mother murdered in order to protect himself. He then organizes with one of the hitmen for an "accident" to occur during a hunting outing in the countryside on which he takes his mother-in-law.

While Camille and Jean go into the woods, Fanny has to return to Paris to bring some medicine to her mother. She stops at her ex-lover's apartment and discovers in a drawer a manuscript of a novel he was writing. She knows that Alain would never have left without the only copy of his still unfinished book. In the woods, now in an isolated place, Jean takes up his rifle and points it at Camille, but he is suddenly shot down by another hunter, who has mistaken him for an animal.

== Cast ==
- Lou de Laâge as Fanny Fournier
- Valérie Lemercier as Camille Moreau
- Melvil Poupaud as Jean Fournier
- Niels Schneider as Alain Aubert
- Guillaume de Tonquédec as Marcel Blanc
- Elsa Zylberstein as Caroline Blanc
- Grégory Gadebois as Henri Delany
- Sara Martins as Julia
- Anna Laik as Marie
- Yannick Choirat as Marc
- William Nadylam as Charles
- Arnaud Viard as Pierre
- Jeanne Bournaud as Linda
- Anne Loiret as Delphine
- Samantha Fuller as Chloé
- Emilie Incerti-Formentini as Suzanne
- Constance Dollé as Pauline
- Isabelle de Hertogh as Charlotte
- Bruno Gouery as Gilles

== Production ==
In July 2022, Woody Allen announced he would be directing a French-language thriller film. In September, Valérie Lemercier, Niels Schneider, Lou de Laâge and Melvil Poupaud joined the cast of the film. In February 2023, it was announced the film was titled Coup de Chance. In an interview posted on October 29th 2025 with producer Julian Schlossberg, Allen said that the budget for Coup de Chance was $15 million, but he ended up only using $12 million.

=== Filming ===
Principal photography began in October 2022 in Paris, France.

=== Soundtrack ===
Owen Gleiberman praised the film's soundtrack, noting: "The film has a jaunty tone of deadpan glee, abetted by its soundtrack of '60s jazz nuggets, notably Herbie Hancock's 'Cantaloupe Island.'"

== Release ==
In April 2023, Metropolitan Filmexport acquired French distribution rights to the film. The film premiered out of competition at the 80th Venice International Film Festival on 4 September 2023, followed by its theatrical release in France on 27 September 2023. Coup de Chance was released in the United States by MPI Media Group in theaters on 5 April 2024, and on digital and VOD platforms on 12 April.

== Reception ==
On the review aggregator website Rotten Tomatoes, the film holds an approval rating of 83% based on 89 reviews, with an average rating of 7/10. The website's critics consensus reads, "Woody Allen's 50th film, Coup de Chance adds yet another creative rebound to the writer-director's oeuvre with a charming thriller that makes up in wit what it lacks in surprises." Metacritic, which uses a weighted average, assigned the film a score of 64 out of 100, based on 17 critics, indicating "generally favorable" reviews. Coup de Chance received an average rating of 2.7 out of 5 stars on the French website AlloCiné, based on 23 reviews.

Xan Brooks of The Guardian gave the film three stars out of five, stating, "The strong, credible performances oil the wheels during these clattering shifts of gear and serve to distract from its occasional moments of implausibility. Implicitly, they also invite us to turn a blind eye to some minor continuity errors." Chris Vognar of the Rolling Stone commented, "Coup de Chance moves briskly, which means two things: the film is well-paced, rendered in mostly short, crisp scenes; and it tends to skim over the surface, using its characters to make philosophical points within a larger scheme." Glenn Kenny, writing for RogerEbert.com, called it "a tight and effective French-language thriller that is also, among other things, the world's longest mother-in-law joke."

A positive review from Leonard Maltin singled out Vittorio Storaro's cinematography, and further stated: "Would anyone pay particular attention to a French import about love and deception without well-known stars if Woody Allen's name weren't attached to it? Perhaps not, but since this is his work—recognizably so—and it shows a sure hand guiding the proceedings, it is worth seeing, and marking as his fiftieth film. I, for one, am looking forward to his next." Rex Reed gave the film three and a half out of four stars, calling it Allen's "best film in years... restoring the masterful filmmaker to his deserved position as one of the screen's most profound storytellers." He additionally singled out the cast: "Superb performances by a sterling cast are an enormous help, too. Especially Lou de Laâge, whose Fanny is endlessly fascinating in a quirky but realistic way, full of unique revelations and traces of Diane Keaton." Peter Travers was also positive, writing "Coup de Chance is no dead shark. It's no career landmark either. But it is Allen moving forward, creating the kind of film he made his name on, the kind that makes you laugh till it hurts. And that's a stroke of luck indeed." He additionally singled out the "exceptional cast", describing de Laâge as "captivating" and praised Storaro's cinematography.

Leslie Felprin of The Hollywood Reporter wrote that "this mostly competent but largely uninteresting, bordering-on-silly work upholds the Allen tradition of just carrying on as usual — doing the same old thing, more or less, with tiny innovations around the edges and some actors in the cast who haven't worked with Allen before." Owen Gleiberman of Variety noted that the film "is rooted in a jaded Continental knowingness about matters of love, marriage, adultery... and getting rid of the people who are gumming up your life... It's not a comedy, but as you watch it you can almost see Woody Allen standing off to the side, chuckling at the human folly he's showing you." The Wall Street Journal called it "Woody Allen's best work in many years."
