= The Tournament (2015 film) =

- Film poster
- Directed by: Élodie Namer
- Written by: Élodie Namer
- Produced by: Lola Gans
- Starring: Michelangelo Passaniti; Lou de Laâge
- Cinematography: Julien Poupard
- Edited by: Nicolas Desmaison; Julien Ouvrard
- Music by: Dombrance
- Production companies: 24 Mai Productions; France 2 Cinéma
- Distributed by: Diaphana Films
- Release dates: 21 April 2015 (COLCOA); 29 April 2015 (France)
- Running time: 83 minutes
- Country: France
- Languages: French; English; Hungarian

The Tournament (French: Le Tournoi) is a 2015 French drama film written and directed by Élodie Namer and starring Michelangelo Passaniti and Lou de Laâge.

== Cast ==
- Michelangelo Passaniti as Cal
- Lou de Laâge as Lou
- Magne-Håvard Brekke as Viktor
- Adam Corbier as Max
- Fabien Libiszewski as Aurélien
- Thomas Solivéres as Mathieu
- Aliocha Schneider as Anthony
- Viktoria Kozlova as Andrea
- Ana Neborac as Natacha
- Magdalena Korpas as Irina
- Victoire Gonin-Labat as Eleanor
