= First Light (2015 film) =

- Directed by: Vincenzo Marra
- Written by: Vincenzo Marra; Angelo Carbone
- Story by: Vincenzo Marra
- Produced by: Arturo Paglia; Isabella Cocuzza
- Starring: Riccardo Scamarcio; Daniela Ramirez
- Cinematography: Maura Morales Bergmann
- Music by: Camila Moreno
- Release date: September 10, 2015 (Venice Film Festival)
- Country: Italy

First Light (Italian: La prima luce [la ˈpriːma ˈluːtʃe]), also known as The First Light, is a 2015 drama film written and directed by Vincenzo Marra and starring Riccardo Scamarcio. It was screened in the Venice Days section at the 72nd Venice International Film Festival, in which it won the Pasinetti Award for Venice Days' Best film.

== Plot ==
Marco is a young and cynical lawyer from Bari. He lives with his partner Martina and their 7-year-old son Mateo. The love story between Marco and Martina, who is Chilean, is about to end. Martina wants to go back to Chile with little Mateo, but Marco doesn't agree as he doesn't want to be separated from his son. However, Martina decides to run away with Mateo, going to Chile and losing her tracks. Marco has no news of his son, and after a period of anguish and confusion he decides to go look for him. He finds himself in a South American metropolis of 6 million people, a reality that makes his research difficult. After an agonizing and inconclusive search, Martina and Mateo seem to have vanished into thin air.

== Cast ==
- Riccardo Scamarcio as Marco
- Daniela Ramirez as Martina
- Gianfabio Pezzolla as Mateo
- Luis Gnecco as Ramos, the Lawyer
- Alejandro Goic as Carlos, the Detective
- Paulina Urrutia as the Judge
- Maria Eugenia Barrenechea as Martina's Aunt

== See also ==
- List of Italian films of 2015
