= Élise Larnicol =

French actress (born 1968)

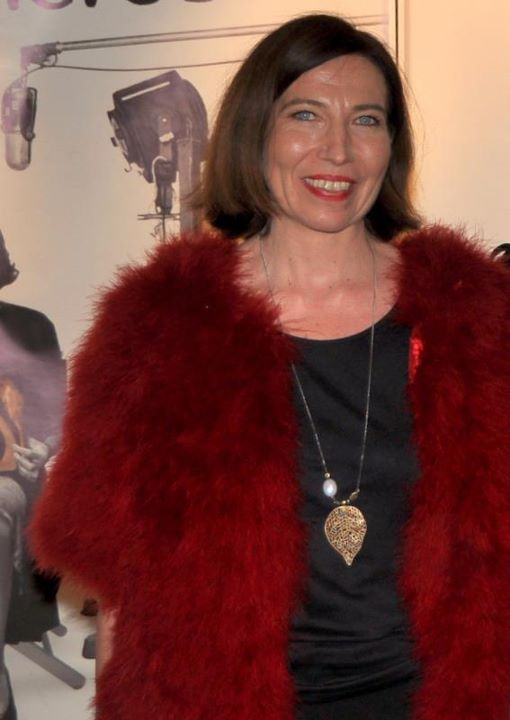
- Larnicol at the 2012 Lumière Awards
- Born: 11 April 1968 (age 57); Cenon, France
- Occupation: Actress
- Years active: 1988–present

Élise Larnicol (born 11 April 1968) is a French film, television and theatre actress.

She is a founding member of the Les Robins des Bois (The Robinhoods, originally The Royal Imperial Green Rabbit Company) comedy troupe, formed in 1996 with fellow former Cours Florent students Pierre-François Martin-Laval, Jean-Paul Rouve, Marina Foïs, Maurice Barthélemy and Pascal Vincent.

== Theatre ==
Year	Title	Author	Director
1988	L'impromptu de Versailles	Molière	Guillaume Destrem
1991	Le Bébé de Monsieur Laurent	Roland Topor	Jean-Christophe Bergeon
1992	Jazz Bass	Patrick Bonnel	Patrick Bonnel
1996–1997	Robin des bois d'à peu près Alexandre Dumas	Les Robins des Bois	Isabelle Nanty & Pierre-François Martin-Laval

== Television ==
Year	TV show	Channel	Notes
1997–1999	La Grosse Émission	Comédie+	with Les Robins des Bois
1999–2001	Nulle part ailleurs	Canal+	with Les Robins des Bois

== Filmography ==
Year	Title	Role	Director	Notes
1998	Serial Lover	Hakim's girlfriend	James Huth	
1999	Trafic d'influence	Françoise Borel	Dominique Farrugia	
2000	Uppercut	The hairdresser	Patrice Jourdan & Sören Prévost	Short
2000–2001	La Cape et l'Épée	Dame Pachole	Jean-Jacques Amsellem, Bernard Faroux, ...	TV series (24 episodes)
2002	Raisons économiques	The Mother	Patrice Jourdan & Sören Prévost	Short
2003	The Car Keys	Herself	Laurent Baffie	
2003	Rien que du bonheur	Françoise	Denis Parent	
2004	RRRrrrr!!!	Pierre (Chief's Wife)	Alain Chabat	
2004	Casablanca Driver	Madame d'Orvier	Maurice Barthélémy	
2004	Le plus beau jour de ma vie	Claire	Julie Lipinski	
2005	Vive la vie	Richard's secretary	Yves Fajnberg	
2005	Le cactus	The programme officer	Gérard Bitton & Michel Munz	
2005	Zooloo	Mayor's neighbor	Nicolas Bazz	Short
2006	Essaye-moi	Couple's women	Pierre-François Martin-Laval	
2006	Bataille natale	Madame Lasage	Anne Deluz	TV movie
2008	15 ans et demi	Sylvie	François Desagnat & Thomas Sorriaux	
2008	Fool Moon	Gaëlle	Jérôme L'hotsky	
2008	Le bal des finissantes	The daughter of ...	Sören Prévost	Short
2010	Henry	Christiane Colo	Kafka & Pascal Rémy	
2010	Cendrillon du pied gauche	The sellor	Benjamin Lehrer	Short
2010	Les Briques de Sang		Jean-Baptiste Pouilloux	Short
2011	Une pure affaire	The cop	Alexandre Coffre	
2011	Une folle envie	Gwenaëlle	Bernard Jeanjean	
2011	I Love Périgord	The mayor	Charles Nemes	TV movie
2012	Bocuse	Béatrice	Stéphanie Pillonca & Géraldine Renault	Short
2012	Monsieur Leroi	Madame Grabin	Simon Masnay	Short
2012	Le naufragé	Adrien's mother	Pierre Folliot	Short
2013	Moroccan Gigolos	Sylvie	Ismaël Saidi	
2013	La vie sans truc	Voice	Anne-Laure Daffis & Léo Marchand	Short
2014	Boulevard du Palais	Sonia	Bruno Garcia	TV series (1 episode)
2015	Lolo	Élisabeth	Julie Delpy	
2015	Une mère en trop	Hélène	Thierry Petit	TV movie
2015	Cherif	Eliane Camara	Pierric Gantelmi D'Ille	TV series (1 episode)
2016	La Dream Team	Bar owner	Thomas Sorriaux	
2016	Le tour du Bagel	Martine	Ludoc	TV series (1 episode)
2016	Commissariat Central	Jocelyne Perrin	Nath Dumont & Varante Soudjian	TV series (16 episodes)
2017	Les ex	Laurence Repp	Maurice Barthélémy	
2017	Studio Movie	The psy	Félix Guimard	TV series (1 episode)
2018	Taxi 5	Minister of Ecology	Franck Gastambide	
2018	La finale	The dog owner	Robin Sykes	
2019	Dark Stories		François Descraques & Guillaume Lubrano	TV movie
2019	Sam	Josie / Estelle	Stéphanie Murat & Arnaud Sélignac	TV series (4 episodes)
2021	Grand ciel	Colette	Noël Alpi	95 Min.
