= The Wait (2015 film) =

2015 film

- Film poster
- Directed by: Piero Messina
- Screenplay by: Giacomo Bendotti; Ilaria Macchia; Andrea Paolo Massara; Piero Messina
- Based on: the play La vita che ti diedi by Luigi Pirandello
- Produced by: Carlotta Calori; Francesca Cima; Nicola Giuliano
- Starring: Juliette Binoche; Lou de Laâge; Giorgio Colangeli
- Cinematography: Francesco Di Giacomo
- Edited by: Paola Freddi
- Music by: Piero Messina; Alma Napolitano; Marco Mangani
- Distributed by: Medusa Film (Italy); Bellissima Films (France)
- Release dates: 5 September 2015 (Venice); 17 September 2015 (Italy); 16 December 2015 (France)
- Running time: 100 minutes
- Countries: Italy; France
- Languages: Italian; French

The Wait (Italian: L'attesa) is a 2015 Italian drama film directed by Piero Messina and starring Juliette Binoche. The film is loosely based on two works by Luigi Pirandello. It was screened in the main competition section of the 72nd Venice International Film Festival.

== Plot ==
A Sicilian mother's son dies unexpectedly, just before his girlfriend comes to visit for the Easter holiday. The grief-stricken mother cannot bring herself to tell the young woman, and the film is about their interaction over a few days.

== Cast ==
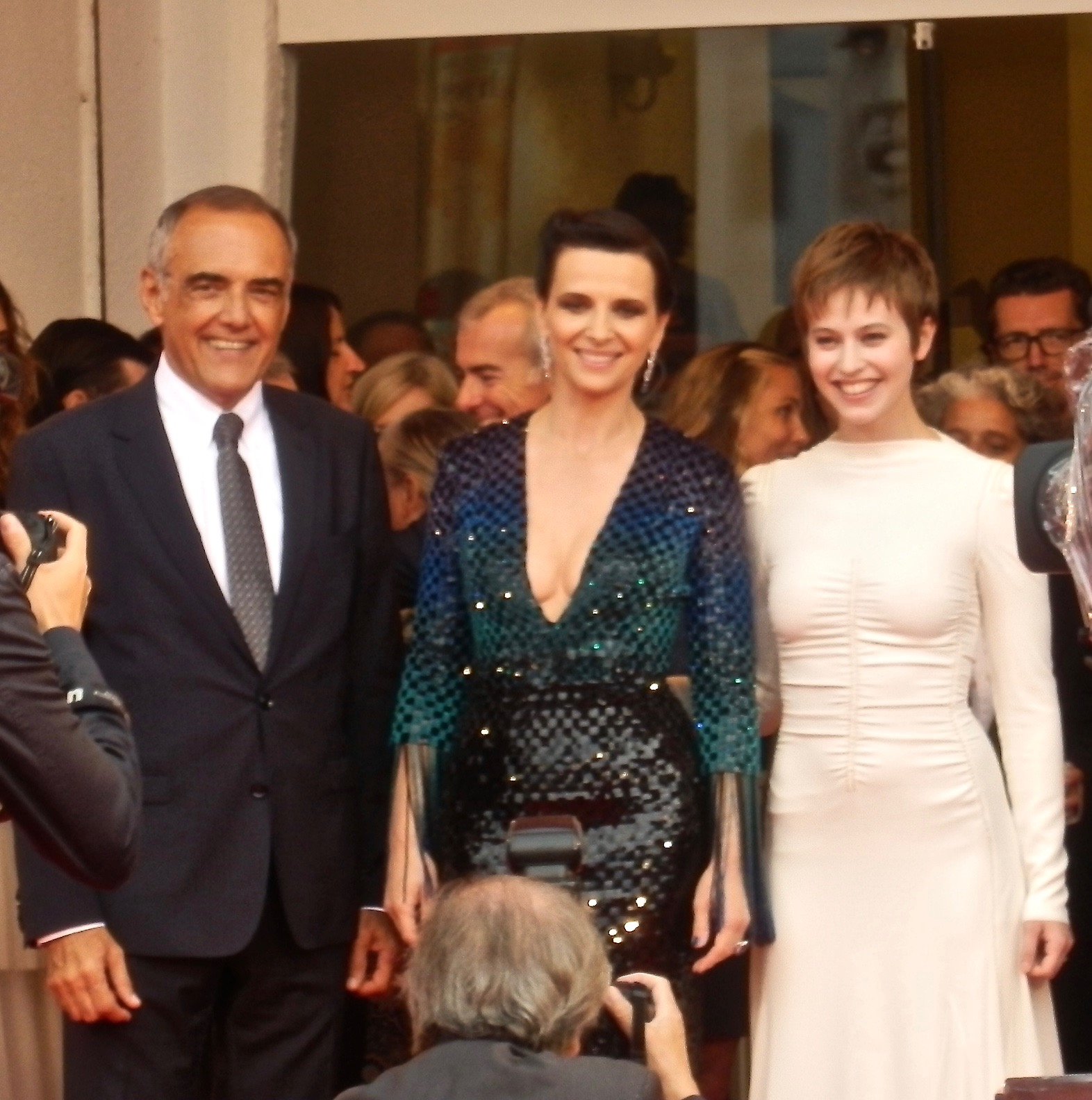
Juliette Binoche, Lou de Laâge and Festival director Alberto Barbera at the film première during the 72nd Venice International Film Festival in 2015

- Juliette Binoche as Anna
- Lou de Laâge as Jeanne
- Giorgio Colangeli as Pietro
- Domenico Diele as Giorgio
- Giovanni Anzaldo as Giuseppe
- Antonio Folletto as Paolo
- Corinna Locastro as Rosa

== Production ==
The film was inspired by a story Piero Messina heard from a friend, about a father who had lost his son, and when the father refused to talk about it, people around him began to act as if it had never happened. While writing the screenplay, Messina was recommended two works by Luigi Pirandello, the tragedy The Life I Gave You (La vita che ti diedi) and the short story "La camera in attesa", and used those to tie the story together. Production was led by Indigo Film in collaboration with Barbary Films and Pathé. Juliette Binoche was cast early on, while Lou de Laâge was found late in the casting process through an audition.

== Reception ==
The Wait has an approval rating of 73% on review aggregator website Rotten Tomatoes, based on 40 reviews, and an average rating of 6.5/10. Metacritic assigned the film a weighted average score of 58 out of 100, based on 16 critics, indicating "mixed or average reviews".

Peter Debruge of Variety wrote:

A clear disciple of Italian master Paolo Sorrentino, the film-school-trained Messina served as assistant director on The Great Beauty, and he adopts many of his mentor's stylistic predilections on his first feature.

Debruge continued:

Watching The Wait, there can be little doubt that this first-time helmer has the potential to become one of Italy's most prominent new voices (the signs were there as early as his Cannes-selected 2011 student film, Terra, another abstractly stylized exercise in psychological identification featuring Colangeli). From Sorrentino, Messina has further developed his ability to deliver a stunning sensory experience, though the treatment feels inadequate for such lean material. If anything, his aesthetic choices are too impressive, calling attention to themselves, rather than discreetly enabling the appropriate emotional reaction.

Mick LaSalle (San Francisco Chronicle) praised the 2 leads, saying of Juliette Binoche, "If you want to see great acting — or more to the point, if you want to see an illustration of the human soul’s complexity — watch Juliette Binoche in this film" and adding of Lou de Laâge, she "has the poise, intelligence and precision to match Binoche." A. O. Scott of The New York Times commented, "It's a pleasure to watch Ms. Binoche and Ms. de Laâge onscreen together. And there are scenes of each of them alone that are piercing and lovely."
