= Burning Love (film) =

2015 Italian mockumentary film

- Directed by: Alberto Caviglia
- Written by: Alberto Caviglia; Benedetta Grasso
- Produced by: Luigi Musini; Olivia Musini
- Starring: Davide Giordano; Omero Antonutti
- Cinematography: Andrea Locatelli
- Music by: Pasquale Catalano
- Release date: September 6, 2015 (Venice Film Festival)
- Running time: 86 minutes
- Country: Italy
- Language: Italian

Burning Love (Italian: Pecore in erba) is a 2015 mockumentary comedy film written and directed by Alberto Caviglia. It premiered in the Horizons section at the 72nd Venice International Film Festival.

== Plot ==
In July 2006, the major television news channels reported the death of Leonardo Zuliani. In Rome, a large group of followers gathers in front of the young activist's birthplace in Trastevere. The mother is desperate, the neighborhood paralyzed and all the authorities express their solidarity with the family while a large demonstration is held in her honor.

An important detail is that what makes Leonardo a national hero is his being anti-Semitic.

== Cast ==
- Davide Giordano as Leonardo
- Anna Ferruzzo as Leonardo's Mother
- Omero Antonutti as Leonardo's Grandfather
- Francesco Pannofino as Leonardo's Father
- Bianca Nappi as Leonardo's Sister
- Mimosa Campironi as Sofia
- Alberto Di Stasio as Psychiatrist
- Lorenza Indovina as Leonardo's Teacher
- Francesco Russo as Guglielmo
- Niccolò Senni as Mario
- Paola Minaccioni as President of AILA
- Marco Ripoldi as Antonio Persica
- Massimiliano Gallo as Don Ciro
- Vinicio Marchioni as Fictional Leonardo in the Movie
- Carolina Crescentini as Fictional Sofia in the Movie
- Margherita Buy as Fictional Leonardo's Mother in the Movie
- Tommaso Mercuri as Leonardo as a Child

== See also ==
- List of Italian films of 2015
