= The Mad Women's Ball =

- Official poster
- French: Le bal des folles
- Directed by: Mélanie Laurent
- Screenplay by: Mélanie Laurent; Christophe Deslandes
- Based on: Le bal des folles by Victoria Mas
- Produced by: Alain Goldman; Axelle Boucaï
- Starring: Mélanie Laurent; Lou de Laâge; Emmanuelle Bercot; Benjamin Voisin; Cédric Kahn; Grégoire Bonnet
- Cinematography: Nicolas Karakatsanis
- Edited by: Anny Danché
- Music by: Asaf Avidan
- Production company: Légende Films
- Distributed by: Amazon Studios
- Release dates: 12 September 2021 (TIFF); 17 September 2021
- Running time: 121 minutes
- Country: France
- Language: French

The Mad Women's Ball (French: Le bal des folles) is a 2021 French supernatural thriller film directed by Mélanie Laurent from a screenplay by Laurent and Christophe Deslandes. It is based upon the novel Le bal des folles by Victoria Mas, and stars Laurent, Lou de Laâge, Emmanuelle Bercot, Benjamin Voisin, Cédric Kahn and Grégoire Bonnet.

It had its world premiere at the 2021 Toronto International Film Festival on 12 September 2021 and was released for streaming on 17 September 2021 by Amazon Studios.

== Plot ==
Eugénie, a radiant and passionate young woman from a wealthy bourgeois family in the 1880s, possessed a unique and extraordinary gift: the ability to perceive the dead through auditory and visual experiences, which caused her to enter into uncontrollable trance states. Upon discovery of her condition, her family involuntarily committed her to the neurological clinic at La Pitié Salpêtrière in Paris. There, the renowned professor Jean-Martin Charcot oversaw the "hysterics department." Eugénie found herself unable to escape, enduring both mistreatment and the misogynistic disdain of the medical staff, many of whom were incompetent.

== Cast ==
- Lou de Laâge as Eugénie Cléry
- Mélanie Laurent as Geneviève Gleizes
- Emmanuelle Bercot as Jeanne
- Martine Chevallier as Grand-mère Cléry
- Benjamin Voisin as Théophile Cléry
- Cédric Kahn as François Cléry
- Lomane de Dietrich as Louise
- Christophe Montenez as Jules
- Coralie Russier as Henriette
- Lauréna Thellier as Marguerite
- Martine Schambacher as Thérèse
- Valérie Stroh as Mère Cléry
- André Marcon as Dr. Gleizes
- Grégoire Bonnet as Dr. Jean-Martin Charcot

== Production ==
In January 2020, it was announced that Mélanie Laurent would write and direct a film based upon the novel Le bal des folles by Victoria Mas, with Alain Goldman serving as a producer under his Légende Films banner. In June 2020, it was announced that Laurent and Lou de Laâge had joined the cast of the film, with Gaumont set to distribute the film in France. In November 2020, it was further announced that Emmanuelle Bercot, Benjamin Voisin, Cédric Khan and Grégoire Bonnet had joined the cast of the film, with Amazon Studios distributing worldwide and with Gaumont no longer distributing.

Principal photography began in November 2020.

The soundtrack was composed by Asaf Avidan and performed by Avidan (Piano and Keyboards) and Coleman Itzkoff (Cello).

== Release ==
The Mad Woman's Ball had its world premiere at the 2021 Toronto International Film Festival on 12 September 2021. It was released on Amazon Prime on 17 September 2021.

== Reception ==
On Rotten Tomatoes the film has an 85% approval rating based on 54 reviews, with an average rating of 7/10. The site's critical consensus reads, "Its themes are occasionally undercut by its storytelling, but outstanding performances give The Mad Women's Ball a poignant, disturbing power." On Metacritic, the film has a rating of 72 out of 100, based on reviews from 14 critics, indicating "generally favorable reviews".

Peter Bradshaw of The Guardian wrote: "Contrived and possibly overheated though the film might be at times, there is real storytelling gusto to it, and Laurent punches it across with relish."
