= Klezmer (film) =

- Directed by: Piotr Chrzan
- Written by: Piotr Chrzan
- Produced by: Aleksandra Zakrzewska
- Starring: Lesław Żurek
- Cinematography: Sylwester Kazmierczak
- Edited by: Cezary Kowalczuk
- Release date: 2015
- Country: Poland
- Language: Polish

Klezmer is a 2015 Polish war-drama film written and directed by Piotr Chrzan. It was screened in the Venice Days section at the 72nd edition of the Venice Film Festival.

== Plot ==
During the Nazi occupation of Poland during World War II, some young people find a wounded Jewish man in the forest and must decide his fate.

== Cast ==
- Lesław Żurek as Michal
- Szymon Nowak as Marek
- Weronika Lewon as Maryska
- Dorota Kuduk as Hanka
- Kamil Przystal as Witus
- Ewa Jakubowicz as Rozalka
- Rafal Mackowiak as Pazyniak
