= Lorenzo Vigas =

Venezuelan film director

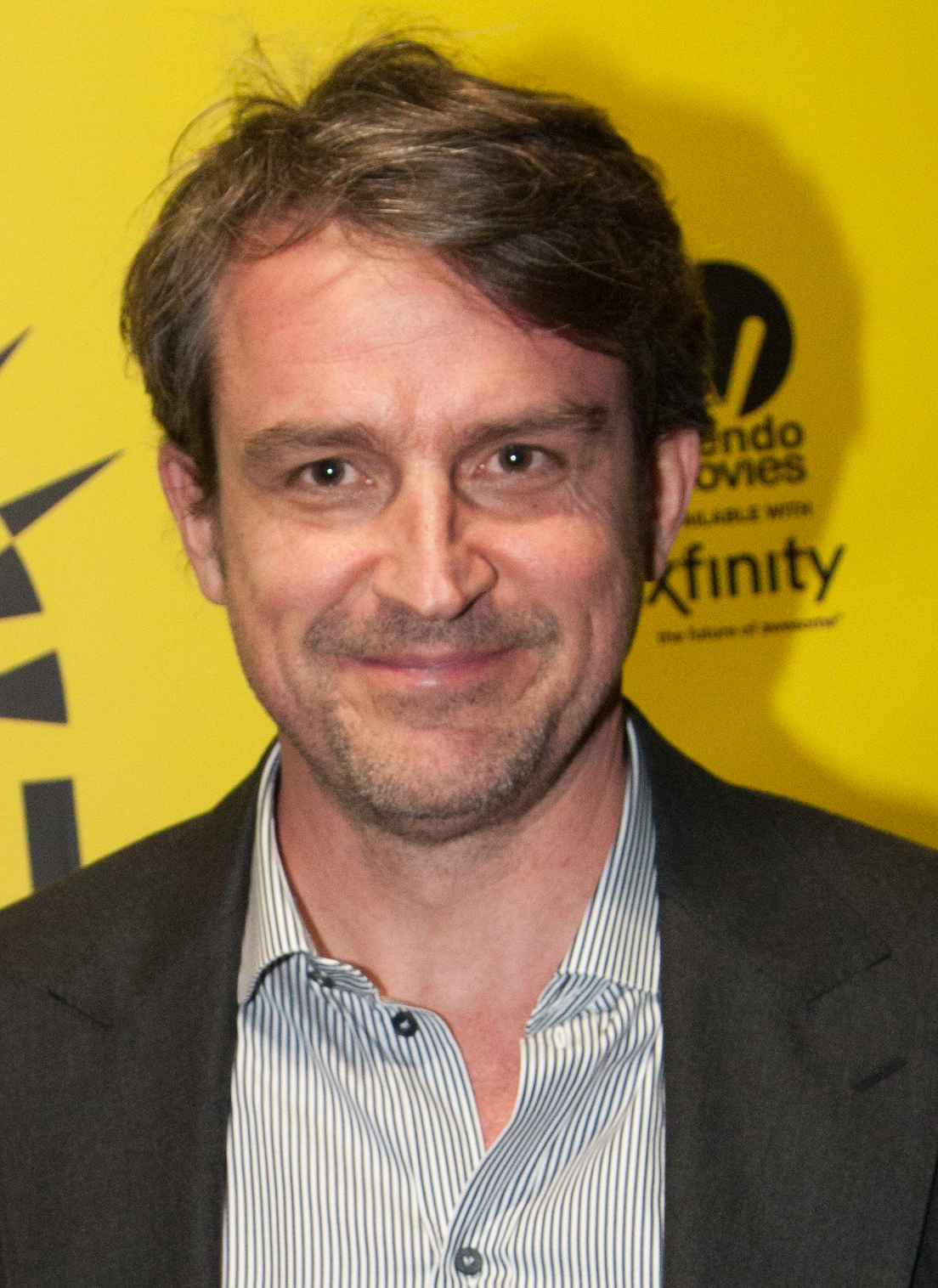
- Vigas at the Miami Film Festival presentation of From Afar
- Born: Lorenzo Vigas Castes; 1967 (age 58–59); Mérida, Venezuela
- Education: University of Tampa
- Occupations: director, screenwriter and film producer
- Awards: Golden Lion

Lorenzo Vigas Castes (born 1967) is a Venezuelan director, screenwriter and film producer.

== Biography ==
=== Education ===
Born in Mérida, the son of the painter Oswaldo Vigas, Vigas graduated in molecular biology at the University of Tampa.

In 1995 he studied cinema at New York University and started directing several experimental films.

=== Career ===
Back in Venezuela in 1998, he directed the RCTV documentary series Expedición and various documentaries and commercials. Located in Mexico, in 2003 he directed the short film Los elefantes nunca olvidan (Elephants Never Forget), produced by Guillermo Arriaga and presented at the Cannes Film Festival.

With his first feature film From Afar, Vigas won the Golden Lion for best film of the 72nd edition of the Venice Film Festival. In July 2016 he was named as a member of the main competition jury for the 73rd Venice International Film Festival where he premiered a documentary on his father titled "The Orchid Seller".

== Filmography ==
- The Box (2021)
- The Orchid Seller (El vendedor de orquídeas), 2016 (Documentary)
- From Afar (Desde allá), 2015
- Los elefantes nunca olvidan, 2004 (Short film)
