= Marius Sznajderman =

Painter, printmaker, and scenic designer (1926–2018)

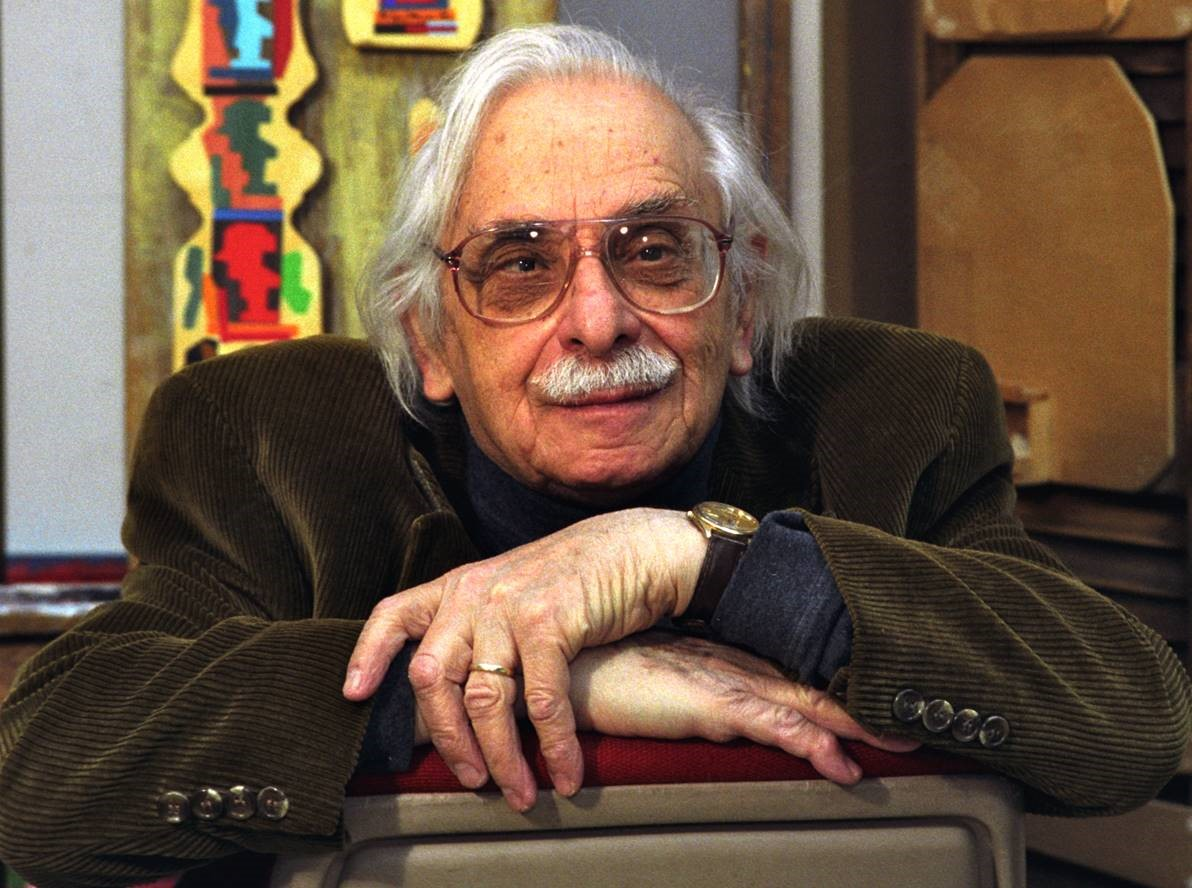
- Marius Sznajderman
- Born: July 18, 1926
- Died: February 24, 2018 (aged 91)
- Occupations: Painter and artist
- Website: mariussznajderman.com

Marius Sznajderman (July 18, 1926 in Paris, France – February 24, 2018 in Amherst, Massachusetts) was a painter, printmaker and scenic designer who lived and worked in the United States.

Born in Paris, Marius escaped to Spain and then Venezuela in 1942 with his parents. He attended the School of Fine Arts in Caracas and immigrated to the United States in 1949, where he received a Bachelor of Fine Arts and Master of Fine Arts from Columbia University in New York. He settled in Hackensack, New Jersey, where he lived and had a studio for more than 50 years before moving to Amherst, Massachusetts in 2015. His work, which includes painting, prints and collages, as well as set designs, is in more than 45 museum and public institution collections in the United States, Latin America and Israel. He held more than 40 solo exhibitions at galleries and museums and participated in more than 75 group shows around the globe.

== Biography ==
Born in Paris in 1926, Sznajderman's Jewish parents had migrated to France from Poland in 1923. In November 1942 the family fled Nazi-occupied France for Spain before settling in Caracas, Venezuela. Sznajderman briefly studied medicine at the Universidad Central de Venezuela in Caracas but did not complete a medical degree. More interested in art than medicine, he attended the School of Fine Arts in Caracas where he studied painting, printmaking and scenic design. His teachers included illustrator Ramon Martin Durban, scenic designer Charles Ventrillon-Horber and painter Rafael Monasterios.

He helped found the Taller Libre de Arte, an experimental workshop for the visual arts, sponsored by the Ministry of Education. The Taller Libre de Arte was a center for young artists to work and to meet with critics and intellectuals to discuss avant-garde ideas and artistic trends from Europe and Latin America. Among the notable artists who participated in the Taller Libre de Arte were Ramón Vásquez Brito, Carlos González Bogen, Luis Guevara Moreno, Mateo Manaure, Virgilio Trómpiz, Alirio Oramas, Dora Hersen, Alejandro Otero, Jesús Rafael Soto, Pascual Navarro, Aimée Battistini, José Fernández Díaz, Narciso Debourg, Oswaldo Vigas and Perán Erminy.

Sznajderman’s early works as a student and young artist showed the influence of Cubism and Expressionism with subject matter ranging from figures to still life to Venezuelan landscapes. His work often explored Latin American themes, art and architecture.

In 1948 Sznajderman was awarded the art student’s prize for a watercolor in the annual National Gallery exhibit. In 1949 Sznajderman had a solo exhibition at the Taller Libre de Arte. The exhibit catalogue was written by Sergio Antillano, a prominent Venezuelan writer and critic.

That same year, Sznajderman immigrated to the United States to attend Columbia University, where he studied with scenic designer J. Woodman Thompson and printmaker Hans Alexander Mueller. He received a Bachelor of Science degree with a major in scenic design in 1953, after which he was drafted into the U.S. Army. In the military he worked as an artist-illustrator, completing his service in 1955. He returned to Columbia on the G.I Bill to attend Teachers College, where he received a Master of Fine Arts in art education.

During the 1950s Sznajderman created set designs for Circle in the Square Theatre, the French Art Theatre and the Felix Fibish Dance Company, all in New York. By the late 1950s, however, his focus was shifting to fine arts and teaching.

In 1956 he married journalist Suzanne Messing. They settled in Hackensack, New Jersey, where the couple reared three children.

In 1960 Sznajderman was among the three founders, along with painters Sam Weinik and Ben Wilson, of the Modern Artists Guild (MAG), an association of modern artists working in northern New Jersey. MAG remained active in the New York metropolitan area into the mid-1980s, with members exhibiting individually and as a group. Among the artists who were early members of MAG were Esther Rosen, Alexandra Merker, Erna Weill, Jerry Goldman, Lillian Marzell and Evelyn Wilson.

In the 1950s, 1960s and 1970s, in addition to painting and printmaking, Sznajderman taught art, art history and design at a number of institutions, including New York University, the School of Visual Arts, Fairleigh Dickinson University and the Ridgewood (N.J.) School of Art. He also taught art in New Jersey public schools under federal and state grants. During this period, Sznajderman’s work ranged from drawings, woodcuts and lithographs to watercolor and acrylic paintings and collages. He produced still life, figures, landscapes and seascapes. Inspirations included Venezuelan remembrances, culture and folklore; Mexican art and pre-Columbian imagery; as well as architecture and theater. Other works have been inspired by Greek mythology and the Commedia dell’arte. Contemporary events, such as the Vietnam War and the assassination of the Rev. Martin Luther King Jr., also inspired some works.

From 1974 to 1983 Sznajderman served as director of Galeria Venezuela in New York City for the National Council of Culture and Fine Arts of Venezuela (CONAC) while continuing to paint and exhibit. From 1980 to 1986 he oversaw the selection and coordination of the international editions of prints for AGPA (Actualidad Grafica – Panamericana), a project of the Latin American Container Corporation of America (later Smurfit Carton de Venezuela).

Throughout his career, Sznajderman has also explored Jewish themes, including works in remembrance of the Holocaust. In 1988 he produced a limited-edition print, in collaboration with his uncle, the Yiddish journalist and author S.L. Shneiderman, on the occasion of Shneiderman’s 80th birthday. The print featured a 1938 poem by Shneiderman, "Elegy for My Shtetl," written in Yiddish. The Yiddish text for the print was typeset using the last linotype machine used to print the New York-based Yiddish newspaper, The Forward. In 1989 he designed and supervised the production of a Holocaust memorial monument for Temple Beth El in Hackensack, New Jersey. The brass monument is now housed at the Alabama Holocaust Education Center in Birmingham. Other works have explored Nazi concentration and extermination camps, the Vichy government and the Holocaust in France.

For many years Sznajderman had a deep friendship and intimate creative relationship with Venezuelan painter Oswaldo Vigas. In 1987, following a trip of the two families to the Venezuelan Andes, a two-person show of landscapes by Sznajderman and Vigas was held at the venerable Ateneo de Caracas, Galeria los Espacios Calidos.

In 1991 the Contemporary Art Museum of Caracas produced a retrospective exhibit of Sznajderman’s work.

In 2001 Sznajderman began a collages and collage constructions series using Yiddish as a leitmotif. A selection of the works were exhibited at the Yiddish Book Center, Amherst, Massachusetts in 2005-2006.

In 2005, Venezuelan poet Hugo Brett Figueroa published the book "Scargot" with illustrations by Sznajderman. Sznajderman also illustrated the 1993 book "Who Were the Pre-Columbians?" by Bernard Barken Kaufman and "Magicismos," a book of poems by the Venezuelan poet Enrique Hernandez D’Jesus, published in 1989.

In 2007, Warsaw Ghetto Revolt mural project and a Nazi concentration camp woodcut series created in 1958 and 1959, was exhibited at the Puffin Cultural Forum in Teaneck, New Jersey. In 2011 and 2012 he produced the "Yanaka" series of collages on paper and a large collage construction using Chiyogami - traditional Japanese printed paper - purchased in 1990 in Tokyo.

In 2011 Sznajderman created seven collages using unauthorized lithographs by Salvador Dali as material. The collages were reproduced in a limited-edition booklet titled "Dali, Dumas and Me." The booklet described a series of events involving the late painter and printmaker Jorge Dumas, who had printed the Dali lithographs. The booklet was presented in 2013 during a solo exhibit by Sznajderman in New York City at Chashama Exhibit Space. Proceeds from the exhibit benefited the World Lung Foundation.

More recently, Sznajderman created a series of print-collages composed from early serigraphs produced in the 1960s. He continued to work and exhibit until the final weeks of his life.

== Permanent collections and exhibitions ==
Sznajderman's work is represented in the permanent collections of more than 45 museums and institutions, primarily in the United States but also in Europe, Latin America and Israel. They include the Smithsonian Institution, the Library of Congress, Instituto Nacional de Bellas Artes y Literatura in Mexico City, Museo de Bellas Artes (Caracas), the Museum of Jewish Heritage in New York, the Cincinnati Art Museum, the Simon Wiesenthal Center, the Birmingham Civil Rights Institute, the Irish Museum of Modern Art in Dublin and Yad Vashem in Jerusalem.

He exhibited widely in the United States and South America over the past 60 years. More recent solo and group exhibitions include the Jewish Community of Amherst, Massachusetts in 2017; the Puffin Cultural Forum in New Jersey, 2007 and 2009; the Yiddish Book Center in Amherst in 2005-06; El Museo del Barrio in New York, 2001; Institute of Puerto Rican Culture in San Juan, 1997; Universidad Metropolitana in Caracas, Venezuela, 1993; and the Contemporary Arts Museum of Caracas, founded by Venezuelan journalist Sofia Imber, in 1991.

== Bibliography ==
- Who’s Who in American Art
- Printworld Directory of Contemporary Prints and Prices
- AGPA, Catalogue of Prints, 1970-1978, Mexico, 1980
- Texts About Art (Venezuela 1682-1982) by Francisco Da Antonio, Monte Avila, 1982, Caracas, Venezuela
- Visual Summary of Plastic Arts in Venezuela, by Juan Calzadilla, MICA Arts Edition, Caracas, Venezuela, 1982
- The Dictionary of Plastic Arts in Venezuela, INCIBA, Caracas, Venezuela, 1972
- The History of Painting in Venezuela, Volume III, by Alfredo Boulton, Caracas, Venezuela, 1972
- Printmaking (Artes Gravicas) in Venezuela, By Juan Calzadilla, Caracas, Venezuela, 1978
- Abstract Painting in Venezuela, 1945–65, By Belgica Rodriguez, Caracas, Venezuela, 1980
- Dictionary of Visual Arts in Venezuela, Monte Avila, Caracas, Venezuela, 1985
- History of Painting in Venezuela, by Carlos Silva, Caracas, Venezuela, 1989
- Oswaldo Vigas, by Gaston Diehl, Caracas, Venezuela, 1993
