= Mountain (2015 film) =

2015 film

- Film poster
- Directed by: Yaelle Kayam
- Written by: Yaelle Kayam
- Starring: Shani Klein
- Release date: 4 September 2015 (Venice)
- Running time: 83 minutes
- Countries: Israel; Denmark
- Language: Hebrew

Mountain is a 2015 drama film directed by Yaelle Kayam. The world premiere took place as part of the "New Horizons" competition at the Venice Film Festival, and the film was also screened at the 2015 Toronto International Film Festival. Additionally, it was featured at the "New Directors, New Films" festival at the Museum of Modern Art (MoMA) in New York. The film won the Jury Prize at the San Francisco Film Festival and First Prize at the Fribourg Film Festival in Switzerland. At Fribourg, Kayam also received the Don Quixote Prize for Breakthrough Female Directors. She was nominated for the Best Director award by the European Union.

== Plot ==
The film's protagonist (Shani Klein) is a religious woman living with her husband (Avshalom Pollak) and their four children in a home located within the Jewish cemetery compound on the Mount of Olives. Her days are spent on household chores and caring for the children. When her husband returns home late in the evening, he pays her little attention, leaving her feeling lonely and frustrated.

One night, in a moment of despair, she storms out of the house and encounters a group of prostitutes and pimps on the outskirts of the cemetery. This encounter stirs a mix of intrigue and revulsion within her, setting off a series of actions both inside and outside the home, culminating in an unforgivable act.

== Interpretation ==
Mountain is a symbolic and allegorical film, not a realist depiction of modern society. The main character represents a religious woman striving to do good according to her values but struggling to find fulfillment or happiness.

In an interview with Haaretz, Kayam elaborated: "There are so many roles a woman is expected to play that we often don’t know how to behave. I was drawn to the idea of a woman trying with all her might to be a 'woman of valor' but failing—doing everything expected of her yet still unloved and undesired by her husband. Such physical rejection is a profound punishment. In films and TV, women are always desired, but in reality, when they are not, the sense of failure is immense. While men may also feel this way, women are especially affected because society constantly tells us we must be beautiful and desirable."

The film was influenced by a Talmudic story about Rabbi Chiyya and his wife, where her husband’s sexual abstention causes her great sorrow. Kayam noted that in this story, the wife is the central figure but remains nameless. Reflecting this, the protagonist in Mountain is also unnamed. The children call her "Mom," the Palestinian laborer calls her "Ma’am," and her husband does not address her directly. Only a prostitute asks her name, to which she hesitantly replies "Tzvia," though it’s unclear whether this is her real name.

== Production ==
Director Yaelle Kayam drew inspiration for Mountain from the Mount of Olives: "For many years, I wanted to make a film about the Mount of Olives. The site exudes tremendous power and spoke to me deeply. It holds countless stories, hopes, dreams, and narratives. It’s the oldest active Jewish cemetery in the world."

During one visit, while standing by the grave of poet Zelda overlooking the Temple Mount, Kayam imagined a woman in her kitchen, staring at a pile of dishes in the sink while gazing out the window at the Temple Mount—viewing it as a promise of redemption. This image deeply moved her and inspired her to begin writing the script.

To prepare for the film, Kayam visited the Mount of Olives repeatedly, sometimes dressed in secular clothing and at other times in religious attire, immersing herself in the environment and observing its visitors. She also explored biblical, Talmudic, and Christian texts related to the site and attended Talmud study classes to deepen her understanding of redemption themes.

The film is the first Israeli-Danish co-production, created by Israeli production company July August Productions and Danish production company Windeløv/Lassen. Vibeke Windeløv, one of the Danish producers, previously collaborated with Lars von Trier on films like Dancer in the Dark and Dogville. Post-production was completed in Copenhagen, Denmark. Filming took 22 nights in March 2014, primarily on the Mount of Olives, with interior house scenes shot in Jerusalem. The film was screened at Tel Aviv’s Lev Cinema and in cinematheques across Israel.

=== Design ===
Kayam drew visual inspiration from the paintings of Artemisia Gentileschi, particularly her depictions of strong women like Judith beheading Holofernes. These influences are evident in the protagonist’s drastic actions at the film’s conclusion and in the interior compositions of the home, crafted with the cinematographer Itai Marom, art designer Neta Dror, and costume designer Hila Galik. Reflecting the ancient setting of the Mount of Olives, the team aimed to give the house an appearance of an ancient cave while maintaining a contemporary feel.

=== Casting ===
Kayam worked together with the casting director Michal Koren. The lead actress and actor (Shani Klein) and actor (Avshalom Pollak) are secular, but the two eldest daughters of the couple (Noga Yaakobovitch and Carmel Levinson) come from religious families. She was looking for religious girls because she thought it would be too difficult for children to learn the Jewish rituals and prayers. She found them with the help of a Facebook group called "I’m a Feminist Religious - And I Have No Sense of Humor."

=== Soundtrack ===
Most of the film is made up of a soundtrack with many sounds of wind. Kayam wanted to create the feeling that the wind is calling to the main character. The soundtrack was designed by Itzik Cohen from Israel and Peter Albertson from Denmark. Ophir Leibovitz composed music for a short part of Shabbat.

== Cast ==
- Shani Klein as Zvia
- Avshalom Pollak as Reuven
