= Lou de Laâge =

French actress (born 1990)

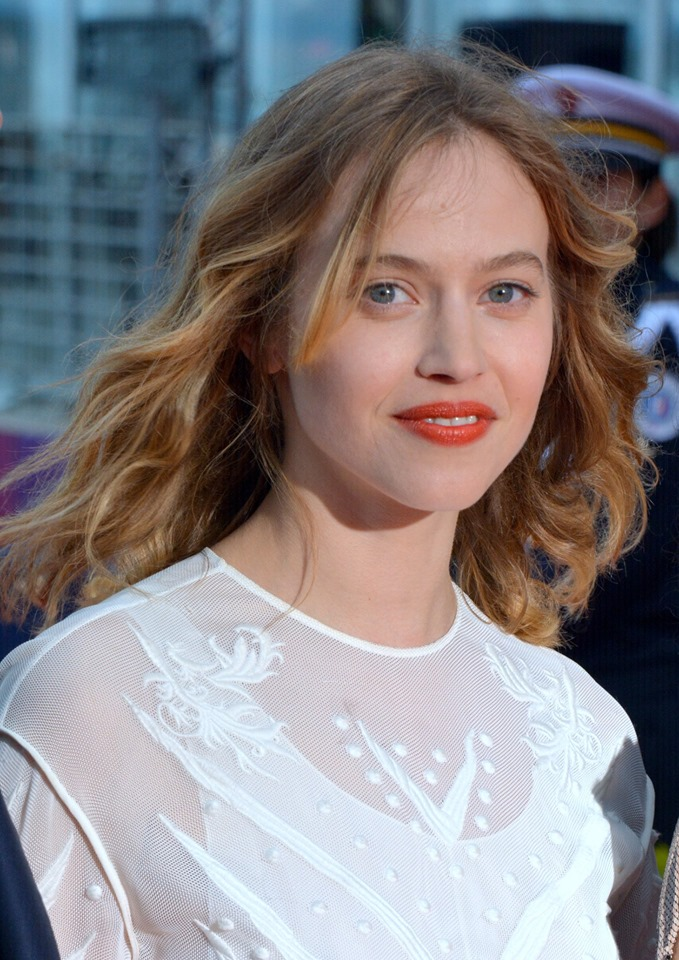
- de Laâge in 2019
- Born: 27 April 1990 (age 35); Bordeaux, France
- Occupation: Actress
- Years active: 2008–present

Lou de Laâge (French pronunciation: [lu.də.lɑːʒ], born 27 April 1990) is a French actress. She has been nominated for two César Awards for her performances in the independent film Jappeloup (2013) and the drama film Respire (2014).

== Life and career ==
She was born in Bordeaux. After receiving her baccalauréat, she moved to Paris and attended the École Claude Mathieu for three years.

She started her career as a model, appearing in a commercial campaign for the cosmetics brand Bourjois in 2009. Shortly after, she started acting in television productions, followed by films and plays.

She was awarded the Prix Romy Schneider in 2016.

== Filmography ==
Year	Title	Role	Notes
2010	Les Petits Meurtres d'Agatha Christie	Clémence Mouson	Episode: "Je ne suis pas coupable"
2010	1788... et demi	Pauline de Saint-Azur	Miniseries, supporting cast
2011	Nino (une adolescence imaginaire de Nino Ferrer)	Natacha	
2011	18 Years Old and Rising	Gabrielle	
2011	La Nouvelle Blanche-Neige	Blanche	TV movie
2013	It Happened in Saint-Tropez	Noga Melkowich	
2013	Jappeloup	Raphaëlle Dalio	Nominated—César Award for Most Promising Actress
2013	Alias Caracalla, au cœur de la Résistance	Suzette	Miniseries, main cast
2013	Anna Karénina	Kitty Scerbatskaya	Miniseries, recurring role
2014	Le Ballon de rouge	Elle	Short film
2014	Respire	Sarah	Nominated—César Award for Most Promising Actress; Nominated—Lumière Award for Best Female Revelation
2014	Notre Faust	Marina	Short film
2015	The Tournament	Lou	
2015	The Wait	Jeanne	Shooting Stars Award
2016	The Innocents	Mathilde Beaulieu	Nominated—Golden Space Needle Award for Best Actress
2018	The Black Book	Laura / Lelia	
2019	Pure as Snow	Claire	
2021	Black Box	Noémie Vasseur	
2021	The Mad Women's Ball	Eugénie Cléry	International Emmy Award for Best Actress
2022	Julia(s)	Julia	
2023	Coup de chance	Fanny	
2025	Étoile	Cheyenne Toussant	Main cast

== Theatre ==
- Il était une fois... le Petit Poucet (Gérard Gelas, 2013)
- Entrez et fermez la porte (Raphaële Billetdoux, Théâtre Essaïon, 2013)
- Ni Dieu, ni Diable (Augustin Billetdoux, Théâtre 13, 2014)
