= Julia(s) =

2022 French film by Olivier Treiner

- Directed by: Olivier Treiner
- Screenplay by: Olivier Treiner
- Produced by: Olivier Treiner; Camille Treiner
- Starring: Lou de Laâge; Dylan Raffin; Esther Garrel
- Cinematography: Laurent Tangy
- Edited by: Valérie Deseine; Camille Delprat
- Music by: Raphaël Treiner
- Production companies: WY Productions; SND Films
- Distributed by: SND Films
- Release date: December 21, 2022
- Running time: 120 minutes
- Country: France
- Language: French
- Box office: $1.5 million

Julia(s) (French: Le Tourbillon de la vie) is a 2022 French romantic drama film written and directed by Olivier Treiner. The film stars Lou de Laâge and Dylan Raffin.

== Plot ==
In the year 2052, a woman named Julia reflects on her life, the decisions she made, and the possibilities they could've led to. Starting at age 17, she wanders through hypothetical choices, relationships, triumphs, and tragedies.

== Cast ==
- Lou de Laâge as Julia Feynman / Julia Sorel / Julia Schönberg
- Raphaël Personnaz as Paul Sorel
- Isabelle Carré as Anna Feynman
- Grégory Gadebois as Pierre Feynman
- Esther Garrel as Emilie
- Sébastien Pouderoux as Gabriel Trauner
- Denis Podalydès as Victor Massenet
- Aliocha Schneider as Nathan Giraud

== Production ==
The film began principal photography on March 1, 2021, and was expected to conclude on May 1, 2021, in Paris, France.
