= Fabien Libiszewski =

French chess grandmaster (born 1984)

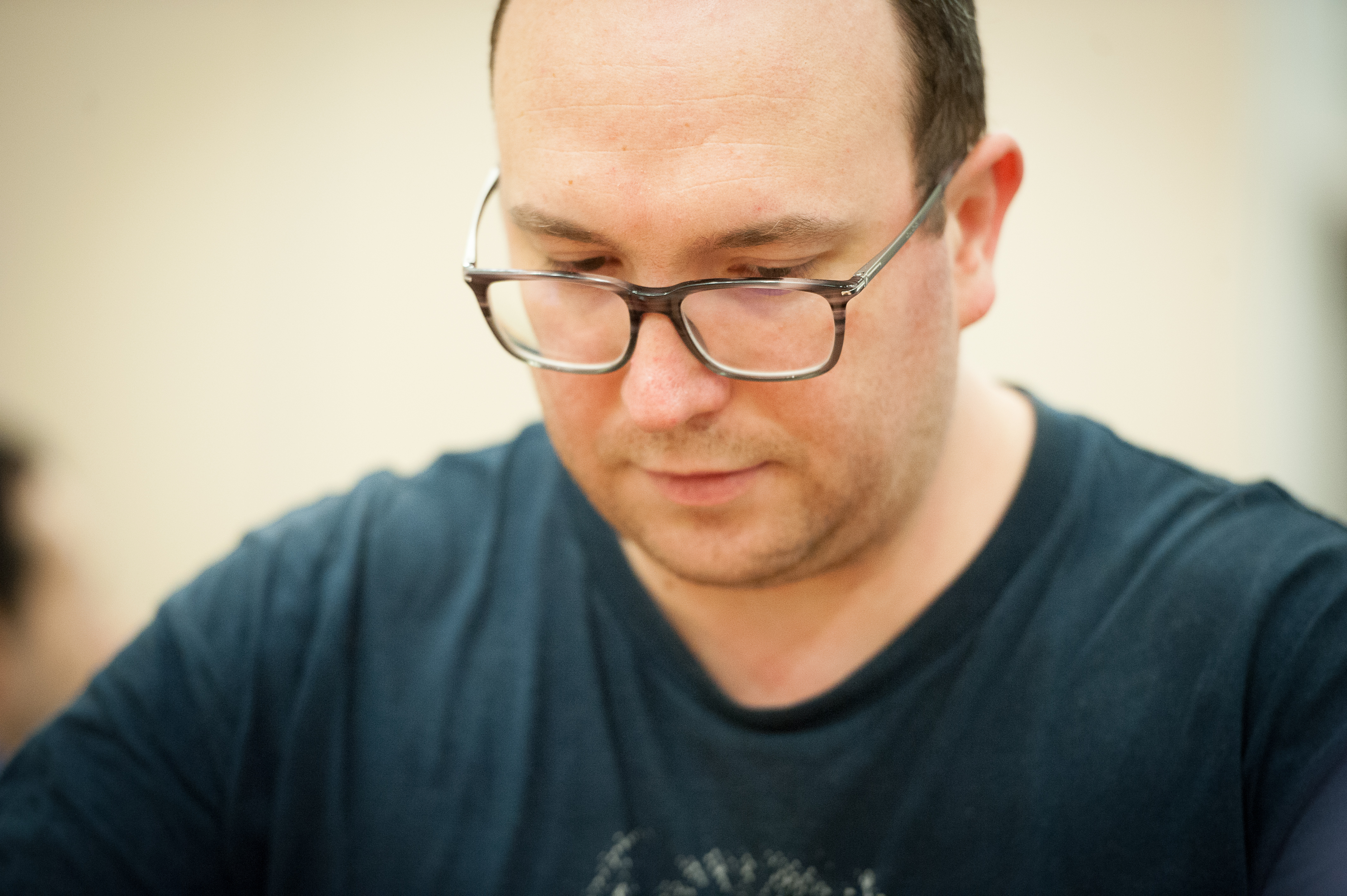
- Libiszewski in 2016

Personal information
- Born: January 5, 1984 (age 42) Saint-Étienne, France

Chess career
- Country: France
- Title: Grandmaster (2009)
- FIDE rating: 2487 (July 2026)
- Peak rating: 2547 (December 2016)

Fabien Libiszewski is a French chess grandmaster and actor.

== Chess career ==
In March 2015, he finished in third place at the Reykjavik Open.

In April 2015, he gave a 24-hour blitz/bullet simul marathon to honor the release of the chess-themed film Le Tournoi, a film in which he also starred and served as chess consultant.

He has given courses on the Janowski Variation of the Queen's Gambit Declined, the Kalashnikov Variation of the Sicilian, and the Caro-Kann.
