= Zhao Liang (director) =

Chinese film director

- Born: 1971 (age 54–55); Liaoning; China
- Education: Lu Xun Academy of Fine Arts
- Occupation: film director
- Website: zhaoliangstudio.com

Zhao Liang (simplified Chinese: 赵亮; traditional Chinese: 趙亮; pinyin: Zhào Liàng; born 1971) is a Chinese documentary film director and artist.

== Life and career ==
Zhao was born in Liaoning, and graduated from Lu Xun Academy of Fine Arts in 1992. He supported himself as a photographer while working on his early documentaries. Zhao's 2009 documentary Petition: The Court of the Complainants premiered at the Cannes Film Festival and is about aspects of the legal system in China. The film was shot over twelve years and details the plight of Chinese citizens traveling to Beijing to file complaints with the central government about local officials. His work focuses on global social and ecological issues.

== Filmography ==
- Return to the Border (2005)
- Crime and Punishment (2007)
- Petition (2009)
- Together (2010)
- Behemoth (2015)
- I'm So Sorry (2021)
