= Yaelle Kayam =

Israeli filmmaker and journalist

- יעל קיים
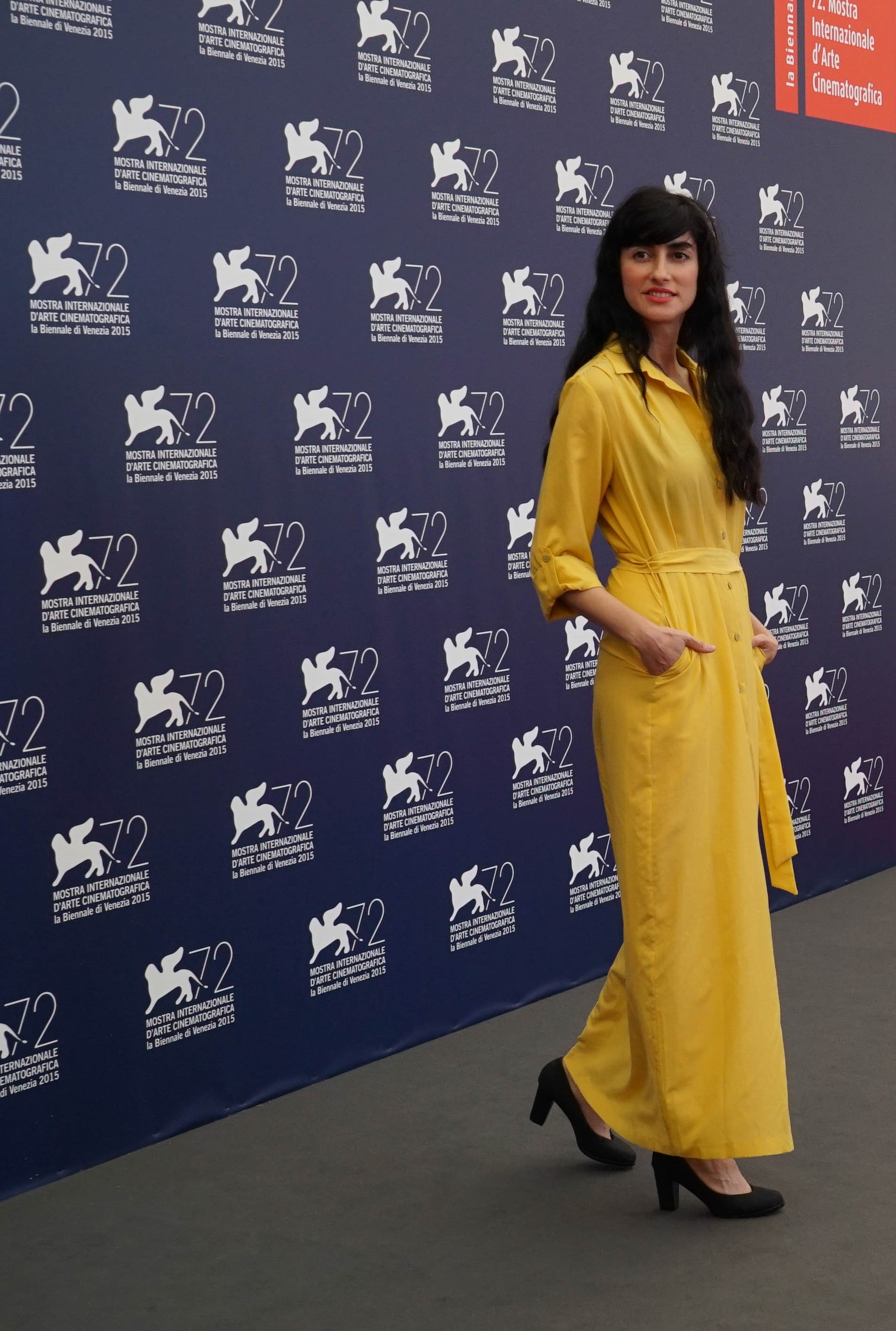
- Yaelle Kayam in 2015
- Born: 1979 (age 46–47); Tel-Aviv, Israel
- Education: Tel-Aviv University Victorian College of the Arts, Melbourne, Australia Sam Spiegel Film and Television School, Jerusalem, Israel
- Occupation: Filmmaker

Yaelle Kayam (Hebrew: יעל קיים), also Yael Kayam is an Israeli filmmaker and journalist.

She is known for her most recent film, Mountain, released in 2015. It was featured at the Toronto International Film Festival. Her other notable works include Providence and Diploma. Diploma was regarded at festivals across the world, including the Cannes Film Festival and the Munich International Student Film Festival. Diploma was later bought by the television production company, Canal+. Her films also have a heavy influence of geography and location. Yaelle Kayam is known for posing strong political questions in her films, and they mostly revolve around the religion of Judaism.

== Biography ==
Yale Kayam was born in 1979 in Tel-Aviv, Israel. Before entering the film world, Yaelle Kayam studied anthropology and acting at the Tel-Aviv University. Yaelle Kayam then moved on to study film and cinema at the Victorian College of the Arts in Melbourne from 2004 to 2006. She lived in a notorious squat on Smith St, Collingwood, hosting musicians, filmmakers, writers and beatniks to her "Factory" style happenings. This is where she obtained her bachelor's degree. Following this, she returned to Israel and finished her studies at the Sam Spiegel Film and Television School in Jerusalem, Israel from 2006 to 2008. During her time there she was highly active in human rights organizations along the West Bank.

== Influences in film ==
Not only is human rights an inspiration for her films but Yaelle Kayam states that "landscapes and especially cultural landscapes – not just geographical places, but also places that have historical and architectural meanings and are still relevant in our lives today" have a heavy impact on her life which she tells through the art of film. Yaelle Kayam calls herself a method director. She spends time analyzing her surroundings and immersing herself into her vision. This is seen in her film Mountain, where in preparation for the film, she visited a cemetery, and due to it being a religious place, she began dressing as a religious person. By spending her time doing such things, she prepares and becomes inspired for her films.

Yaelle Kayam is also known for her films being politically motivated, and having a central theme revolving around a political question. This is shown in her films Diploma and Mountain through emotional and personal portrayals of overcoming of obstacles that create barriers on people, whether through religion or war. Not only has Yaelle Kayam directed documentary films of her own, but she took part in the Adam Mickiewicz Institute documentary project, called New Gaze, which took place in Portland.

== Film career ==
Yaelle Kayam has done a few films since finishing school. Her first film, was her graduate film, Diploma. It was shown at the Cinefondation's Cannes Film Festival in 2009 and won third place. Diploma was a short film shown in more than seventy festivals worldwide. Diploma won fourteen other international awards as well, such as the Best Screenplay Award and the Intercultural Award at the Munich International Student Film Festival. Diploma was then bought for screening by the French television company Canal+ and was shown at the Museum of Modern Art in New York.

Yaelle Kayam's first feature film was Providence. Providence is a dark comedy which takes place in a small village in the middle of lawless territories along the West Bank. Yaelle Kayam's latest feature film is Mountain, which came out in 2015, and premiered at the Venice Film Festival. Mountain stars new coming actress Shani Klein. Yaelle Kayam wrote the screenplay for this film, and developed it through the TorinoFilmLab Script&Pitch programme in 2012. She's also participated in the Framework programme in 2013. The script follows the traditional lifestyle of an Orthodox family. The Orthodox family lives in a cemetery on the Mount of Olives. Yaelle Kayam began writing the script for Mountain by starting from the geographical region, which then led to a mixture of reality and imagination, she ended up finishing the script within three weeks. She also spent six months going back to the location focused on in the film, the Jewish cemetery. She also chose to set it in an Orthodox Jewish community because it was very natural to the place, and because Yaelle Kayam herself is Jewish, which made it easy for her to relate and write the script. This is because she knows about Judaism in terms of culture and religion more than Christianity or Islam. Mountain is also one of the films featured at the Toronto International Film Festival.
