= Piero Messina =

Italian film director (born 1981)

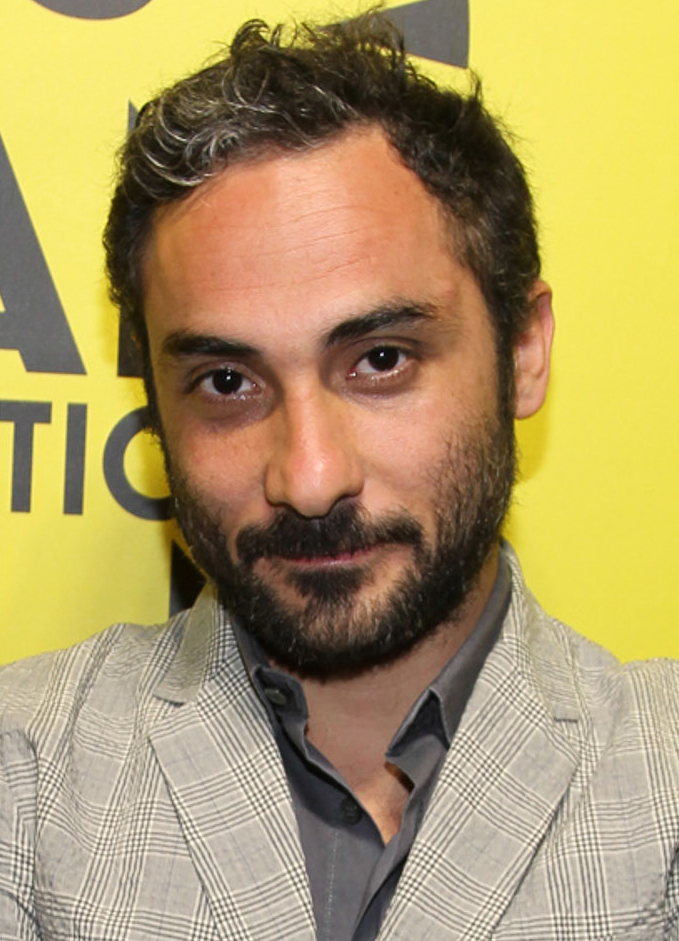
- Piero Messina at the Miami Film Festival
- Born: 30 April 1981 (age 43); Caltagirone, Italy
- Occupation: Film director

Piero Messina (born 30 April 1981) is an Italian film director. He is best known for directing the 2015 film The Wait.

Peter Debruge of Variety wrote about the film:

A clear disciple of Italian master Paolo Sorrentino, the film-school-trained Messina served as assistant director on The Great Beauty, and he adopts many of his mentor's stylistic predilections on his first feature.

Debruge continued:

Watching The Wait, there can be little doubt that this first-time helmer has the potential to become one of Italy's most prominent new voices (the signs were there as early as his Cannes-selected 2011 student film, Terra, another abstractly stylized exercise in psychological identification featuring Colangeli). From Sorrentino, Messina has further developed his ability to deliver a stunning sensory experience, though the treatment feels inadequate for such lean material. If anything, his aesthetic choices are too impressive, calling attention to themselves, rather than discreetly enabling the appropriate emotional reaction.
