= Rinku Kalsy =

Indian/Dutch documentary film director

- Born: Mumbai, Maharashtra, India
- Occupation(s): Film Editor, Film Director

Rinku Kalsy is an Indian/Dutch documentary film director. She graduated in economics in Mumbai. And studied filmmaking in Amsterdam. Her debut as a director for the documentary film For the Love of a Man, about the fan clubs of Indian film star Rajinikanth, premiered at the 71st Venice International Film Festival. She lives between Mumbai and Amsterdam.
