= For the Love of a Man =

- Poster
- Directed by: Rinku Kalsy
- Produced by: Joyojeet Pal
- Starring: G.Mani; Kamal Anand; K. Hariharan; N.Ravi; Hoseyn Qadir
- Cinematography: P.S. Sandeep, Udit Khurana
- Edited by: Rinku Kalsy
- Music by: Anuraag Dhoundeyal
- Release date: 2015
- Running time: 82 minutes
- Country: India
- Language: English

For the Love of a Man is a 2015 Indian documentary film directed by Rinku Kalsy. The film explores the fan following of film actor Rajinikanth.

== Synopsis ==
For the Love of a Man begins with coverage of fan activities during the releases of Rajinikanth's blockbuster films. It then proceeds to explain the historical and political context of fandom in Tamil Nadu through the stories of four fans: Kamal Anand, a mimicry artist, G. Mani, a gangster turned peanut-seller, and Murugan and Ravi, two sweetshop owners from Sholinghur.

== Reception ==
The film premiered at the 71st Venice International Film Festival. The Venice review expressed mixed feelings about the absence of Rajinikanth in the film. The Hollywood Reporter review likewise critiqued the film for the absence of the star from the film, but praised the film for providing a "jaw-dropping, intro to the extremes of actor-worship." The film was also shown at the Dubai International Film Festival and at the Mumbai International Film Festival, where it was cited as among the top documentaries of 2015.
