= From Afar (film) =

2015 film

- Promotional release poster
- Directed by: Lorenzo Vigas
- Written by: Lorenzo Vigas
- Story by: Lorenzo Vigas; Guillermo Arriaga
- Starring: Alfredo Castro; Luis Silva
- Cinematography: Sergio Armstrong
- Release date: 10 September 2015 (Venice)
- Running time: 94 minutes
- Countries: Venezuela; Mexico
- Language: Spanish
- Box office: $148,594

From Afar (Spanish: Desde allá) is a 2015 Venezuelan-Mexican psychological drama film written and directed by Lorenzo Vigas in his directorial debut. It won the Golden Lion at the 72nd Venice International Film Festival. It was selected as the Venezuelan entry for the Best Foreign Language Film at the 89th Academy Awards but it was not nominated.

The film is about Armando, a wealthy middle-aged man who gets involved with Élder, a young man from a street gang.

== Cast ==
- Alfredo Castro as Armando
- Luis Silva as Élder
- Jericó Montilla as Amelia
- Catherina Cardozo as María
- Jorge Luis Bosque as Fernando
- Greymer Acosta as Palma
- Auffer Camacho as Mermelada

== Accolades ==
Award / Film Festival	Category	Recipient(s)	Result
AFI Fest	Audience Award New Auteurs	Lorenzo Vigas	Nominated
Apolo Awards	Best Film	From Afar	Nominated
Apolo Awards	Best New Director	Lorenzo Vigas	Won
Apolo Awards	Best Adapted Screenplay	Lorenzo Vigas	Nominated
Apolo Awards	Best Actor	Alfredo Castro	Nominated
Apolo Awards	Best New Actor	Luis Silva	Won
Biarritz Film Festival	Best Actor	Luis Silva	Won
Glasgow Film Festival	Audience Award	Lorenzo Vigas	Nominated
Goya Awards	Best Spanish Language Foreign Film	Lorenzo Vigas	Nominated
Havana Film Festival	Grand Coral - First Work	Lorenzo Vigas	Won
Viña del Mar International Film Festival	Paoa Prize - Best Picture	Lorenzo Vigas	Won
Viña del Mar International Film Festival	Best Director	Lorenzo Vigas	Won
Miami International Film Festival	Best Screenplay	Lorenzo Vigas	Won
Montclair Film Festival	Narrative Feature Competition	Lorenzo Vigas	Nominated
Munich Film Festival	Best Film By An Emerging Director	Lorenzo Vigas	Nominated
San Francisco International Film Festival	New Director	Lorenzo Vigas	Nominated
San Sebastián International Film Festival	Horizons Award - Special Mention	Luis Silva	Won
San Sebastián International Film Festival	Horizons Award	Lorenzo Vigas	Nominated
Thessaloniki International Film Festival	Golden Alexander	Lorenzo Vigas	Nominated
Thessaloniki International Film Festival	Best Screenplay	Lorenzo Vigas	Won
Thessaloniki International Film Festival	Best Actor	Alfredo Castro	Won
Venice Film Festival	Golden Lion	Lorenzo Vigas	Won
Venice Film Festival	Green Drop Award	Lorenzo Vigas	Nominated
Zagreb Film Festival	The Golden Pram	Lorenzo Vigas	Nominated

== See also ==
- List of lesbian, gay, bisexual or transgender-related films of 2015
- List of submissions to the 89th Academy Awards for Best Foreign Language Film
- List of Venezuelan submissions for the Academy Award for Best Foreign Language Film
