= Petition (film) =

2009 film by Zhao Liang

Petition (Chinese: 上访; pinyin: shàngfǎng) is a documentary released in 2009 by Chinese independent filmmaker Zhao Liang. The film was screened as a Special Screening of the official selection of the 2009 Cannes Film Festival.

Over the course of 12 years (1996-2008), director Zhao Liang follows the "petitioners", who travel from all over China to the nation's capital, Beijing, to make complaints about injustices committed by authorities in their home towns and villages. Most petitioners wait for months or years for their grievances to be heard, while they live in makeshift shelters around the southern railway station of Beijing. All types of cases are represented: mothers of abused young soldiers, farmers thrown off their land, workers from demolished factories, and more. The documentary explores the Sisyphean lives of the petitioners as they contend with the authorities and their own families in their struggle for restitution and survival. At times it was filmed with hidden cameras smuggled into government offices.

== Awards ==
2012

- Open City Docs Fest, London, U.K.

2011

- The Marek Nowicki Prize, the XI International Film Festival WATCH DOCS. Human Rights in Film, Warsaw, Poland

2010

- Golden Reel Award, 9th Tiburon International Film Festival, California, U.S.A.
- Jury Award, Festival International du Film des Droits de I’Homme à Paris, France
- Humanitarian Awards for Documentaries, 34th Hong Kong International Film Festival, Hong Kong
- Documentary Edge Best Director, DOCNZ 2010, Auckland, New Zealand

2009

- 62nd Cannes film festival, France
- Award for Best Feature Documentary, 7th Doc Lisboa, City of Lisbon, Portugal
- Halekulani Golden Orchid Award for Best Documentary Film, 29th Hawaii International Film Festival, U.S.A.
- BIG STAMP Award in International Competition (Best Film), ZagrebDox, Czech
- Movies That Matter: Award Best Promotes Human Rights, The Hague, Holland

2008

- 61st Locarno film festival, Switzerland
