= Hummingbird (film) =

2013 British film by Steven Knight

- UK theatrical release poster
- Directed by: Steven Knight
- Written by: Steven Knight
- Produced by: Guy Heeley; Paul Webster
- Starring: Jason Statham; Agata Buzek
- Cinematography: Chris Menges
- Edited by: Valerio Bonelli
- Music by: Dario Marianelli
- Production companies: IM Global; Shoebox Films; Shine Pictures
- Distributed by: Lionsgate (United Kingdom); Roadside Attractions (United States)
- Release date: 17 May 2013
- Running time: 100 minutes
- Countries: United Kingdom; United States
- Language: English
- Budget: $20 million
- Box office: $12.6 million

Hummingbird (released as Redemption in the United States) is a 2013 action thriller film written and directed by Steven Knight in his directorial debut. It stars Jason Statham as a haunted, alcoholic veteran who befriends a Catholic nun, becomes involved in organized crime, and exacts vengeance on a man who beats and kills prostitutes.

== Plot ==
Joseph Smith, a fugitive ex-Special Forces soldier and a homeless drunk in London, is attacked by a group of thugs one night, and breaks into a luxurious apartment to escape them. Learning that the owner, a successful photographer named Damon, is away for the next 8 months until October, Joseph starts squatting there and assumes a new identity, calling himself Joey Jones and using Damon's resources while looking for his homeless friend Isabel, who has been coerced into becoming a prostitute by the gang that attacked him. He suffers from PTSD from his time in serving overseas and often has hallucinations of hanged men and of "hummingbirds", the aerial drones in Afghanistan.

Joseph is friends with Sister Cristina, a Polish nun who runs the local soup kitchen. To deflect the suspicion of Damon's neighbors, he tells them that he is Damon's boyfriend and starts working at a Chinese restaurant. One night at work, Joseph fights off some rowdy diners, impressing senior manager Mr. Choy, who is affiliated with a Chinese organised crime syndicate. He hires Joseph as a driver and enforcer.

Joseph uses the money he earns to buy food for the homeless at the soup kitchen and gifts for Cristina. He also encounters Dawn, his ex-lover and mother of his nine-year-old daughter, who is angry at him, as they are struggling financially. Joseph gives her a large amount of money.

Joseph learns from Cristina that Isabel was murdered; enraged, he confronts the thugs who attacked him earlier, and acquires a rough description of the killer. In order to pass the information on to Cristina, he invites her to an art gallery, where she gets drunk and reveals that she used the money he gave her to buy tickets for a ballet set to happen on the same date as Damon's return. While driving her home, Joseph learns that she wanted to be a ballet dancer and was sexually abused by her gymnastics instructor as a child; she eventually murdered him, but due to her age at the time, she was sentenced to a convent instead of a prison. Feeling distracted due to her relationship with Joseph, she asks for a transfer to Africa.

Mr. Choy's boss, Madame Choy, helps Joseph identify Isabel's killer in exchange for driving a truck containing people being smuggled into the UK. The killer is Max Forrester, a man who assaults prostitutes. Joseph is given an invitation to a rooftop cocktail party Max will attend.

Cristina tells Joseph that she will leave for Africa the next day and wants to end her journey here with him, and the two of them sleep together. As Damon returns home, the two flee through the fire escape. Cristina invites Joseph to join her at the ballet that night. Joseph instead delivers a bag full of the money he saved to Dawn along with photos of him well-dressed so that his daughter will remember him that way. He then goes to the rooftop cocktail party, where he kills Max by throwing him off the building. Joseph flees and Cristina finds him drunk and passed out on the curb. Upon waking, Joseph reveals that he is on the run from a court martial for five revenge killings he carried out on random civilians in Afghanistan for the deaths of five of his men.

The next day, Cristina receives a note from Joseph, revealing he has paid his debts to everyone, including Damon, has informed the police about Mr. Choy's human trafficking operation, and will now disappear into the streets once again. As a drunk Joseph walks into the streets, he is pursued by the police with the help of drones similar to the "hummingbirds".

== Cast ==
- Jason Statham as Joseph Smith / Joey Jones, an ex-special forces soldier
- Agata Buzek as Sister Cristina, a young nun
- Christian Brassington as Max Forrester, a murderous city boy
- Vicky McClure as Dawn
- Benedict Wong as Mr. Choy
- Ger Ryan as Mother Superior
- Victoria Bewick as Isabel
- Sang Lui as Tony
- Lillie Buttery as young Cristina
- Youssef Kerkour as Bouzanis
- Danny Webb as Damon Caulfield
- Dai Bradley as Billy
- Bruce Wang as Tim
- Siobhan Hewlett as Tracey
- Steven Beard as Karl

== Production ==
Hummingbird was almost entirely filmed at night. Filming sites included popular streets for homeless people, some of whom were involved in the shoot. Statham stated that before filming started some research was undertaken into the mental health issues of his character, including ex-servicemen asked about their experiences.

The Dartford Crossing is featured in Hummingbird twice – when Joey drives a van across the bridge and when a lorry approaches the toll. The area around the Covent Garden Market was featured in several scenes. Among the buildings used was St Paul's and Royal Opera House.

The sound track features "Malka Moma", a Bulgarian folk style song, with lyrics and music by Neli Andreeva and Georgi Genov. The song is performed by the Bulgarian National Folk Ensemble "Philip Koutev". Neli Andreeva, choirmaster with the ensemble, is the soloist.

== Release ==
Hummingbird was released in the United Kingdom, the United States (as Redemption), France (as Crazy Joe) and in Germany (as Redemption - Stunde der Vergeltung) on 28 June 2013.

== Reception ==
=== Critical response ===
Based on 50 reviews, Rotten Tomatoes gives a score of 50% with an average rating of 5.3/10. The site's critical consensus reads, "While it certainly has more on its mind than the average Jason Statham action thriller, Redemption doesn't quite capitalize on its premise – or on its star's strong, committed performance." On Metacritic, the film has a weighted average score of 43 out of 100 based on 14 critics, indicating "mixed or average reviews".

== See also ==
- List of films featuring drones
