= Glasat na Bulgaria season 12 =

Glasat na Bulgaria
- Season 12
- Promotional poster featuring coaches Medi, Maria Ilieva, Dara, and Ivan Lechev
- Hosted by: Vladimir Zombori; Boryana Bratoeva
- Coaches: Ivan Lechev; Dara; Maria Ilieva; Medi

Release
- Original network: bTV
- Original release: 6 September 2026 – present

Season chronology
- ← Previous; Season 11

The twelfth season of Bulgarian singing reality competition Glasat na Bulgaria premiered on 6 September 2026. Ivan Lechev, Dara and Maria Ilieva returned as coaches from the previous season. In the meantime, debuting coach Medi replaced Grafa as a coach this season.

== Coaches and hosts ==
Coaches of Glasat na Bulgaria season twelve

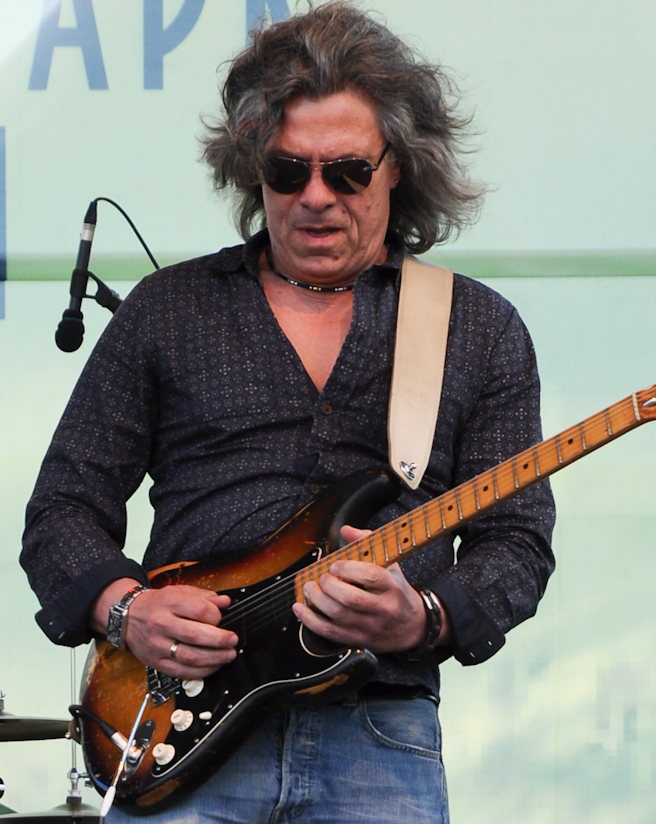
Ivan Lechev

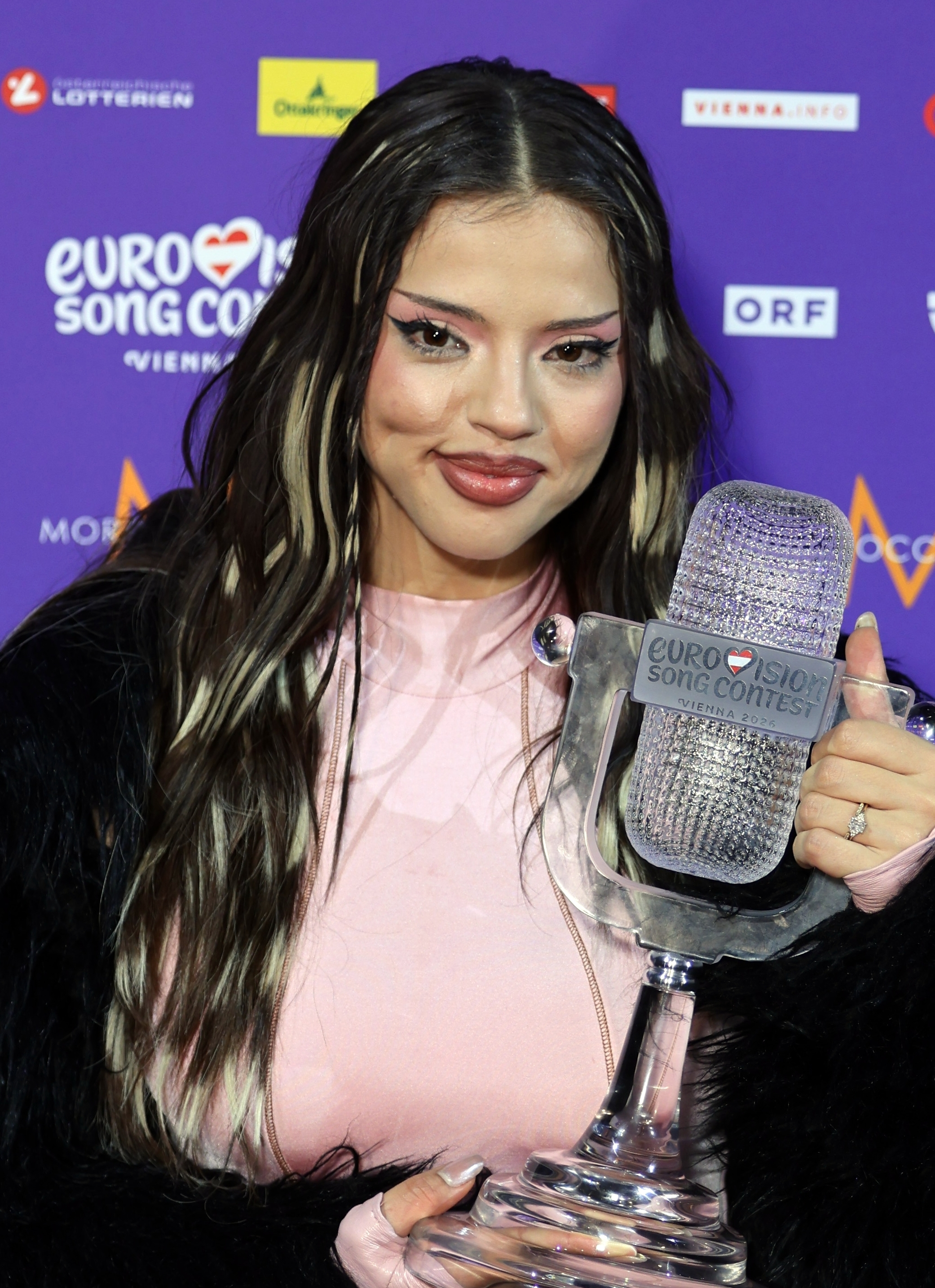
Dara

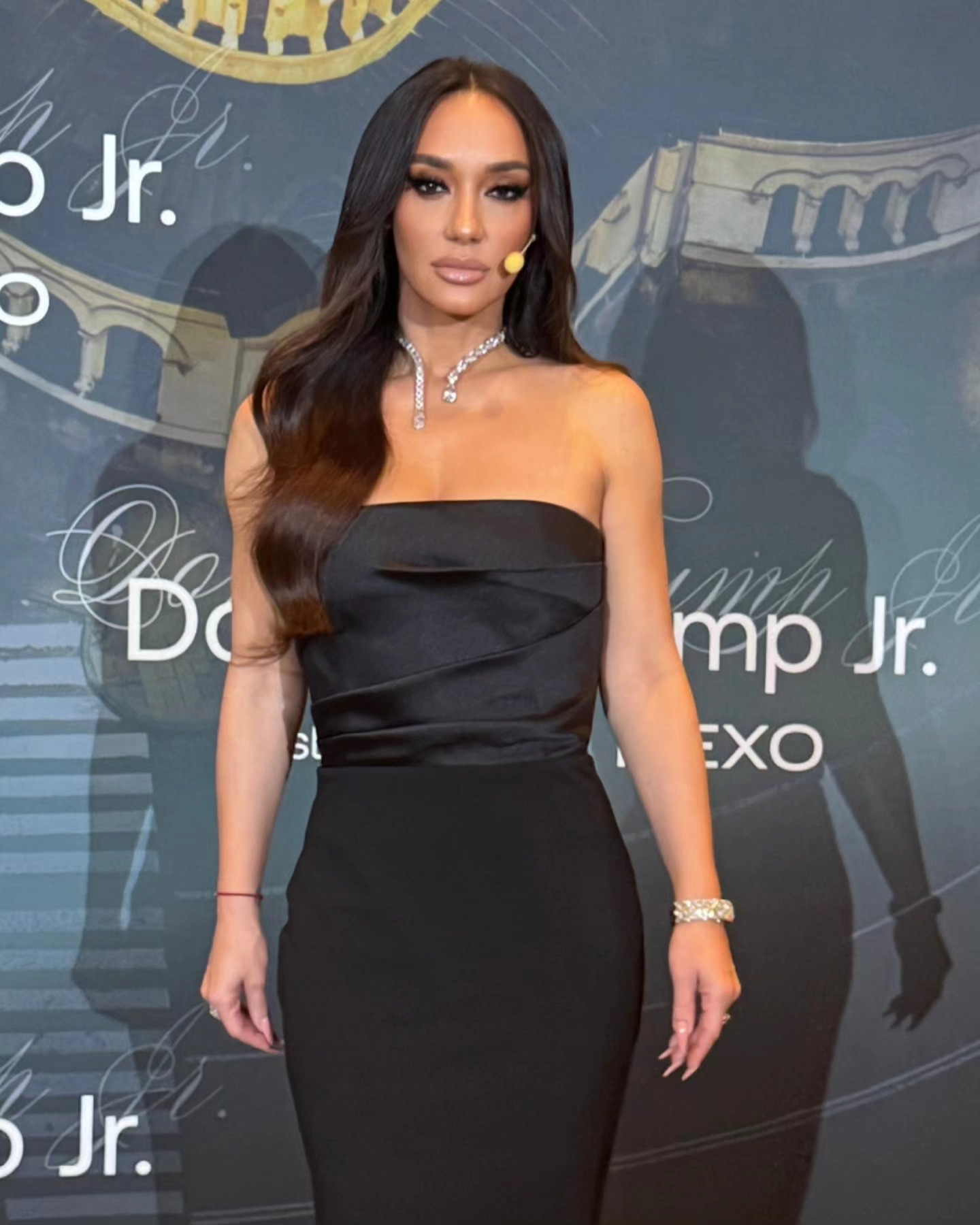
Maria Ilieva

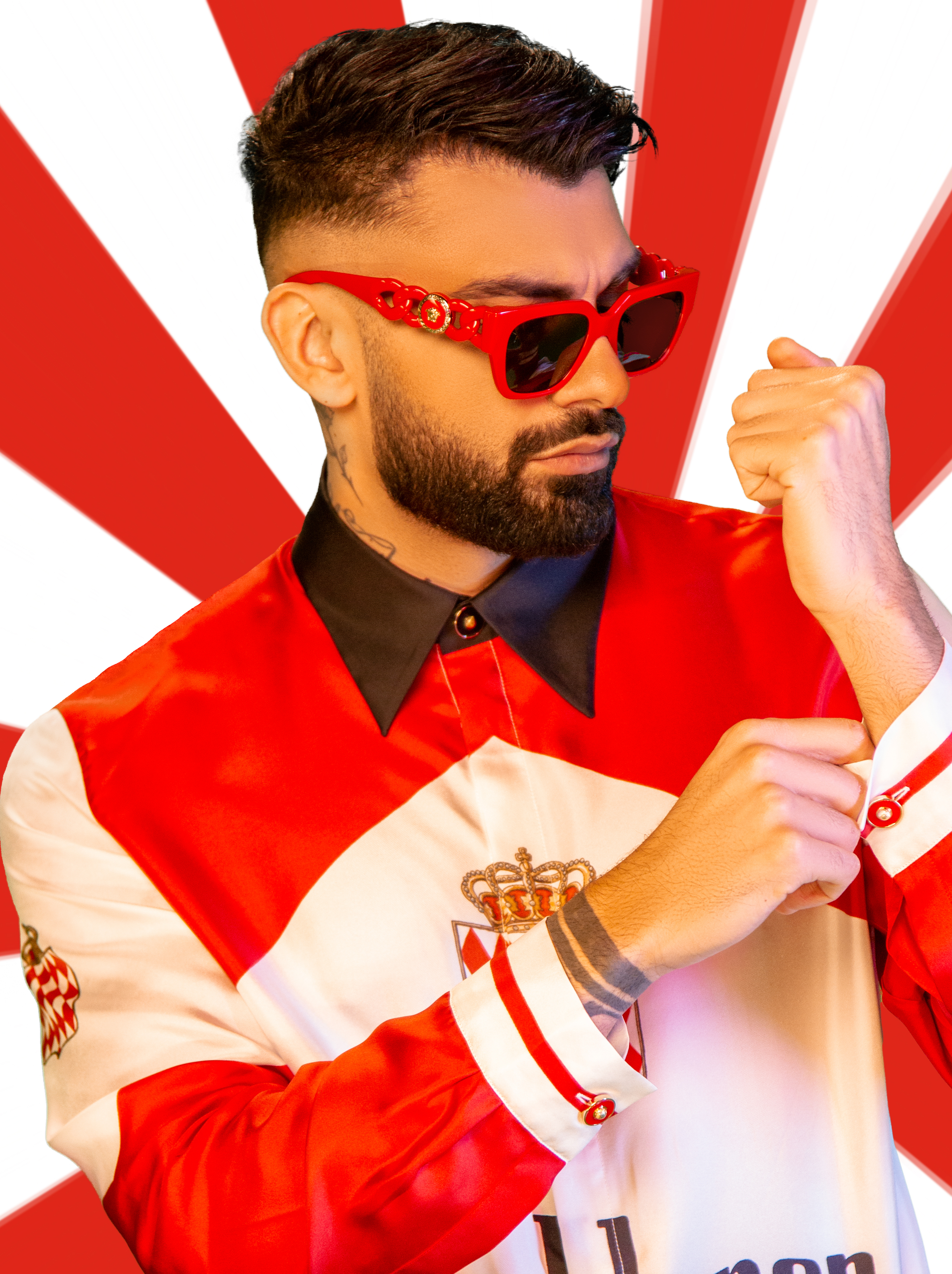
Medi

Ivan Lechev, Dara and Maria Ilieva returned for their ninth, fifth and third consecutive season as coaches. They were joined by new coach Medi.

Vladimir Zombori and Boryana Bratoeva returned as hosts from the last season.

== Teams ==
- Winner
- Runner-up
- Third place
- Fourth place
- Fifth place
- Eliminated in the Live shows
- Eliminated in the Knockouts
- Stolen in the Battles
- Eliminated in the Battles
- Eliminated in the Final selection

Coaching teams
Coaches	Top 72 Artists				
Ivan Lechev					
Ivan Lechev	Emil Bonev	Marieta Dragieva	Georgi Dachev	Mariana Dobreva	Yoana Tasheva
Ivan Lechev	Albena Kalcheva	Elitsa Uzunova	Bozhidara Georgieva	~~Nikola Nikolov~~	~~Andrey Manov~~
Ivan Lechev	Petar Marinov	Yanitsa Stancheva	Angelina Sekulova	Viktoria Litvinenko	Evelina & Svetlana
Ivan Lechev	Borislav Pavlov	Greta Bakalova	Marina Baleva	Emilian Bardarski	
Dara					
Dara	Vasil Zhelev	Anna-Maria Ivanova	Vyara Vasileva	Dobromir Vasilev	Darya Doychinova
Dara	Stanislav Iliev	Nikola Nikolov	Kalina Despodska	~~Fransis Karshaliyska~~	~~Elitsa Uzunova~~
Dara	Milena Zaharieva	Viktoria Ivanova	Kristina Gocheva	Katerina Vasileva	Georgi Hristov
Dara	Martina Peycheva	Rumen Kolev	Tsvetozar Zahariev	Rosen Metev	Bozhana Mitova
Maria Ilieva					
Maria Ilieva	Zheni Krincheva	Martina Gospodinova	Trio Deja Vu	Yoanna Yovcheva	Ruslan Kumanov
Maria Ilieva	Fransis Karshaliyska	Andrey Manov	Dona Todorova	~~Yasen Korabov~~	~~Kalina Despodska~~
Maria Ilieva	~~Teofil Shabanov~~	Lyudmil Donchev	Denislav Karaivanov	Elitsa Stancheva	Emili Marinova
Maria Ilieva	Estelle Peycheva	Gergana Kochkova	Dobromira Hristova		
Medi					
Medi	Nikola Popov	Krum Krumov	Diana Dimitrova	Angel Nedelchev	Yanitsa Ruseva
Medi	Victoria Asenova	Teofil Shabanov	Yasen Korabov	~~Bozhidara Georgieva~~	Kalina Stanitsvetova
Medi	Emilio Filipov	Rosen Usev	Dona Mosto	Mario Krastev	Lilyana Kaftandzhieva
Medi	Sofia Glavopoulou	Silvena Kostova	Dancho Metodiev	Gergana Nedelcheva	Galina Genova
Medi	Eva Dzhevizova-Mishi	Dean Gogov	Karine Aslanyan		
Note: Italicized names are stolen artists (names struck through within former teams).

== Blind auditions ==
Each coach had one block and one superblock to use throughout the auditions.

Blind auditions color key
✔	Coach pressed "I WANT YOU" button
	Artist joined this coach's team
	Artist selected to join this coach's team
	Artist was eliminated as no coach pressed their button
	Artist was, initially, part of the team but was eliminated on the cut round
✘	Coach pressed "I WANT YOU" button, but was blocked by another coach from getting the artist
✘	Coach pressed "I WANT YOU" button, but was superblocked by another coach from getting the artist
	Blocked by Ivan; Blocked by Dara; Blocked by Maria; Blocked by Medi

=== Episode 1 (6 September) ===
The coaches performed "Dve sledi" together at the start of the episode to kick off the season.

Order	Artist	Age	Hometown	Song	Coach's and artist's choices			
Order	Artist	Age	Hometown	Song	Ivan	Dara	Maria	Medi
1	Nikola Popov	29	Sofia	"Bésame Mucho"	✘	✔	✔	✔
2	Fransis Karshaliyska	26	Smolyan	"I Believe to My Soul"	✔	✔	✔	✔
3	Desislava Radeva	18	Burgas	"Mon amour"	—	—	—	—
4	Emil Bonev	19	Ruse	"Figure.09"	✔	✔	✔	✔
5	Zheni Krincheva	16	Sofia	"Happier Than Ever"	✔	✔	✔	—
6	Lilyana Kaftandzhieva	27	Velingrad	"Bez teb"	—	✔	—	✔
7	Atanas Panev	18	Plovdiv	"Hijo de la Luna"	—	—	—	—
8	Angelina Sekulova	55	Montana	"I'll Be There"	✔	—	—	✔
9	Emili Marinova	26	Pernik	"Vision of Love"	✔	✘	✔	✔
10	Ethan Schaber	31	New York City	"Kolelo"	—	—	—	—
11	Viktoria Ivanova	18	Sevlievo	"Beautiful Things"	—	✔	—	✔
12	Krum Krumov	18	Petrich	"Writing's on the Wall"	✔	✔	✔	✔

=== Episode 2 (13 September) ===
Order	Artist	Age	Hometown	Song	Coach's and artist's choices			
Order	Artist	Age	Hometown	Song	Ivan	Dara	Maria	Medi
1	Ruslan Kumanov	17	Sofia	"Hard to Handle"	✔	✔	✔	✔
2	Bozhidara Georgieva	22	Plovdiv	"Defying Gravity"	✔	—	✔	✔
3	Vasil Zhelev	16	Varna	"Confident"	✔	✔	—	✔
4	Ema Komitova	20	Sofia	"Nothing Breaks Like a Heart"	—	—	—	—
5	Evelina & Svetlana	15 & 46	Burgas	"Thank You for the Music"	✔	—	✔	✔
6	Martin Yanakiev	24	Varna	"Naley"	—	—	—	—
7	Elitsa Stancheva	21	Sofia	"Dive"	✔	✔	✔	✔
8	Viktoria Litvinenko	16	Ukraine	"Show"	✔	—	—	✔
9	Angel Nedelchev	17	Razlog	"Gubia te Bavno"	—	✔	—	✔
10	Anna-Maria Ivanova	26	Sofia	"Cuz I Love You"	✔	✔	✔	✔
11	Borislav Pavlov	27	Vidin	"Man in the Box"	✔	—	—	✔
12	Vyara Vasileva	17	Sopot	"Anyone"	✔	✔	✔	✔

=== Episode 3 (20 September) ===
Order	Artist	Age	Hometown	Song	Coach's and artist's choices			
Order	Artist	Age	Hometown	Song	Ivan	Dara	Maria	Medi
1	Andrey Manov	15	Sofia	"Ostani Tazi Nosht"	✔	✔	✔	✔
2	Katerina Vasileva	20	Pernik	"Decode"	✔	✔	—	✔
3	Mario Krastev	21	Velingrad	"Human"	✔	—	—	✔
4	Lyudmil Donchev	58	Varna	"Pochti zabravena lyubov"	✔	✔	✔	✔
5	Dana Takhor	23	Sofia	"From the Start"	—	—	—	—
6	Nikola Nikolov	17	Pozharevo	"Hallelujah I Love Her So"	✔	✔	✔	✔
7	Diana Komitova	45	Plovdiv	"Ordinary"	—	—	—	—
8	Yoanna Yovcheva	21	Plovdiv	"Disease"	✔	—	✔	✔
9	Dobromir Vasilev	27	Yambol	"Nedey da me Budish"	✔^{1}	✔	—	✔
10	Nikolina Terzieva	28	Varna	"Anxiety"	—	—	—	—
11	Yanitsa Ruseva	40	Veliko Tarnovo	"I Put a Spell on You"	✔	✔	—	✔
12	Martina Gospodinova	17	Varna	"Ain't No Way"	✔	✘	✔	✔

- ^1 Medi used his super-block on Lechev during the performance, but it was invalid because the block can only be used before turning, and the super-block after the performance.

=== Episode 4 (27 September) ===
Order	Artist	Age	Hometown	Song	Coach's and artist's choices			
Order	Artist	Age	Hometown	Song	Ivan	Dara	Maria	Medi
1	Elitsa Uzunova	16	Sofia	"Die on This Hill"	✔	✔	✔	✔
2	Sofia Glavopoulou	29	Serres	"Ela Pou... Fovame"	—	—	✔	✔
3	Alex Ivanov	31	Sofia	"Relax, Take It Easy"	—	—	—	—
4	Kristina Gocheva	18	Panagyurishte	"Oscar Winning Tears"	✔	✔	—	—
5	Denislav Karaivanov	29	Varna	"I Can't Make You Love Me"	✔	—	✔	✔
6	Marieta Dragieva	22	Sofia	"You Oughta Know"	✔	✔	✔	—
7	Richie Tien	18	Sofia	"Za tebe byah"	—	—	—	—
8	Georgi Dachev	37	Kavarna	"Yellow"	✔	✔	—	—
9	Petar Marinov	37	Kavarna	"Moy svyat"	✔	✔	✘	✔
10	Kaia Titeva	21	Sofia	"If You Let Me"	—	—	—	—
11	Dona Mosto	22	Nova Zagora	"I Got You (I Feel Good)"	✔	—	✘	✔
12	Silvena Kostova	27	Shumen	"Callin' U (Tamally Maak)"	—	✔	—	✔
13	Trio Deja Vu	—	Burgas	"Il mondo"	✔	✔	✔	✔

=== Episode 5 (4 October) ===
Order	Artist	Age	Hometown	Song	Coach's and artist's choices			
Order	Artist	Age	Hometown	Song	Ivan	Dara	Maria	Medi
1	Kalina Despodska	20	Velingrad	"I Am Changing"	✔	✔	✔	✔
2	Greta Bakalova	19	Varna	"Abracadabra"	✔	✔	✔	✔
3	Dancho Metodiev	44	Sofia	"Tsvete moe"	—	—	✔	✔
4	Yasen Korabov	25	Varna	"Halo"	—	—	✔	✔
5	Aset Fleming	17	Sofia	"Wait a Minute!"	—	—	—	—
6	Milena Zaharieva	48	Varna	"Come As You Are"	✘	✔	✔	✔
7	Gergana Nedelcheva	21	Varna	"Malka Moma"	✔	—	—	✔
8	Stanislav Iliev	22	Sliven	"Bruises"	✔	✔	✔	✔
9	Nikolay Nikolov	41	Sofia	"Balada"	—	—	—	—
10	Rosen Usev	21	Bozhurishte	"Bubamara"	—	—	✔	✔
11	Marina Baleva	32	Varna	"Expectations"	✔	—	✔	—
12	Kalina Stanitsvetova	31	Varna	"Leden dujd"	✔	✔	✔	✔

=== Episode 6 (11 October) ===
Order	Artist	Age	Hometown	Song	Coach's and artist's choices			
Order	Artist	Age	Hometown	Song	Ivan	Dara	Maria	Medi
1	Victoria Asenova	16	Sofia	"Oops!… I Did It Again	✔	✘	✔	✔
2	Mariana Dobreva	45	Burgas	"Shallow"	✔	✔	✔	✔
3	Sevar Milev	18	Sofia	"The Man Who Sold the World"	—	—	—	—
4	Estelle Peycheva	22	Sofia	"Lyubov"	✔	—	✔	✔
5	Emilian Bardarski	16	Sofia	"Johnny B. Goode"	✔	—	—	✔
6	Galina Genova	47	Manastirishte	"Sama i Nervozna"	—	—	✔	✔
7	Raya Varbanova	19	Ruse	"Love On Top"	—	—	—	—
8	Yanitsa Stancheva	28	Varna	"Exactly Like You"	✔	✔	✔	✔
9	Georgi Hristov	24	Cherven Bryag	"The Loneliest"	—	✔	✔	—
10	Eva Dzhevizova-Mishi	22	Sliven	"Zhiva"	—	—	✔	✔
11	Martina Peycheva	23	Dobrich	"What About Us"	—	✔	—	—
12	Teofil Shabanov	27	Sandanski	"Da Si Tuk"	—	—	✔	✔
13	Yoana Tasheva	16	Stara Zagora	"A Song for You"	✔	✔	✔	✔
14	Rumen Kolev	54	Haskovo	"Nezhno postoyanstvo"	✔	✔	—	—

=== Episode 7 (18 October) ===
Jonathan Roy made a guest appearance with his song "Keeping Me Alive" at the end of the episode.

Order	Artist	Age	Hometown	Song	Coach's and artist's choices			
Order	Artist	Age	Hometown	Song	Ivan	Dara	Maria	Medi
1	Diana Dimitrova	24	Sofia	"My Immortal"	✔	✔	✔	✔
2	Gospodin Ivanov	35	Gabrovitsa	"Sine"	—	—	—	—
3	Dona Todorova	21	Sofia	"How Come U Don't Call Me Anymore?"	—	—	✔	—
4	Tsvetozar Zahariev	23	Sevlievo	"No Time to Die"	✔	✔	✔	—
5	Gergana Kochkova	19	Sofia	"Sunny"	–	✔	✔	–
6	Dean Gogov	20	Blagoevgrad	"Surtseto mi"	—	—	✔	✔
7	Karine Aslanyan	22	Burgas	"Comeback"	—	—	✔	✔
8	Rosen Metev	17	Gabrovo	"Recovery"	✔	✔	—	—
9	Veronika Savova	24	Sofia	"Prazen kadur"	—	—	—	—
10	Albena Kalcheva	20	Veliko Tarnovo	"Best Part"	✔	—	✘	—
11	Anna-Maria Vurtovska	31	Sofia	"Oh! Darling"	—	—	—	—

=== Episode 8 (24 October) ===
Order	Artist	Age	Hometown	Song	Coach's and artist's choices			
Order	Artist	Age	Hometown	Song	Ivan	Dara	Maria	Medi
1	Darya Doychinova	17	Sofia	"Ti si surtse"	—	✔	✔	✔
2	Tomislav Komov	26	Blagoevgrad	"Give Me All Your Love"	—	—	—	—
3	Emilio Filipov	18	Kirchevo	"Zoro le, Zoro"	—	—	✔	✔
4	Bozhana Mitova	17	Blagoevgrad	"Don't Rain on My Parade"	—	✔	—	—
5	Stoyan Mindov	17	Plovdiv	"Bosi vremena"	—	—	—	—
6	Dobromira Hristova	37	Kyustendil	"Freed from Desire"	✔	✔	✔	✔

== Battles ==
The Battles started airing on October 31. The non-stop steal from the last three seasons was abandoned as now each coach had two steals during the whole round.

This year's battle advisors were season 3 coach and season 11 semi-final super coach Orlin Goranov for Team Ivan, Doni for Team Dara (who was also her advisor in season 8), Papi Hans for Team Maria and Sofi Marinova for Team Medi.

Battles color key
Artist won the battle
Artist lost the battle but was stolen by another coach
Artist lost the battle and was eliminated

Battles results
Episode	Order	Coach	Winner	Song	Loser	'Steal' result			
Episode	Order	Coach	Winner	Song	Loser	Ivan	Dara	Maria	Medi
Episode 9 (October 31)	1	Dara	Dobromir Vasilev	"E.T."	Katerina Vasileva	—	—N/a	—	—
Episode 9 (October 31)	2	Ivan	Yoana Tasheva	"Moga"	Andrey Manov	—N/a	—	✔	—
Episode 9 (October 31)	3	Medi	Yanitsa Ruseva	"Something's Got a Hold on Me"	Mario Krastev	—	—	—	—N/a
Episode 9 (October 31)	4	Maria	Dona Todorova	"A Thousand Years"	Elitsa Stancheva	—	—	—N/a	—
Episode 9 (October 31)	5	Ivan	Marieta Dragieva	"Are You Gonna Be My Girl"	Nikola Nikolov	—N/a	✔	—	✔
Episode 9 (October 31)	6	Medi	Krum Krumov	"Daylight"	Dona Mosto	—	—	—	—N/a
Episode 9 (October 31)	7	Maria	Ruslan Kumanov	"Ako utre me gubish"	Teofil Shabanov	✔	—	—N/a	✔
Episode 9 (October 31)	8	Dara	Vyara Vasileva	"Fall in Line"	Elitsa Uzunova	✔^{1}	—N/a	—	—
Episode 10 (November 8)	1	Maria	Martina Gospodinova	"Alone"	Kalina Despodska	✔	✔	—N/a	✔
Episode 10 (November 8)	2	Ivan	Emil Bonev	"Animals"	Viktoria Litvinenko	—N/a	Team full	—	—
Episode 10 (November 8)	3	Medi	Diana Dimitrova	"Ederlezi"	Rosen Usev	—	Team full	—	—N/a
Episode 10 (November 8)	4	Dara	Anna-Maria Ivanova	"Born Again"	Kristina Gocheva	—	Team full	—	—
Episode 10 (November 8)	5	Maria	Yoanna Yovcheva	"Every Breath You Take"	Denislav Karaivanov	—	Team full	—N/a	—
Episode 10 (November 8)	6	Dara	Vasil Zhelev	"Señorita"	Viktoria Ivanova	—	Team full	—	—
Episode 10 (November 8)	7	Ivan	Mariana Dobreva	"Zvezda"	Angelina Sekulova	—N/a	Team full	—	—
Episode 10 (November 8)	8	Medi	Nikola Popov	"Time to Say Goodbye"	Bozhidara Georgieva	✔	Team full	✔	—N/a
Episode 11 (November 15)	1	Dara	Darya Doychinova	"Fallin'"	Fransis Karshaliyska	Team Full	Team Full	✔	✔
Episode 11 (November 15)	2	Medi	Angel Nedelchev	"Prikazka"	Emilio Filipov	Team Full	Team Full	Team Full	—N/a
Episode 11 (November 15)	3	Ivan	Albena Kalcheva	"So Easy (To Fall in Love)"	Yanitsa Stancheva	Team Full	Team Full	Team Full	—
Episode 11 (November 15)	4	Maria	Zheni Krincheva	"Don't Speak"	Yasen Korabov	Team Full	Team Full	Team Full	✔
Episode 11 (November 15)	5	Dara	Stanislav Iliev	"Up Where We Belong"	Milena Zaharieva	Team Full	Team Full	Team Full	Team Full
Episode 11 (November 15)	6	Medi	Victoria Asenova	"You Got the Love"	Kalina Stanitsvetova	Team Full	Team Full	Team Full	Team Full
Episode 11 (November 15)	7	Ivan	Georgi Dachev	"The Reason"	Petar Marinov	Team Full	Team Full	Team Full	Team Full
Episode 11 (November 15)	8	Maria	Trio Deja Vu	"You Raise Me Up"	Lyudmil Donchev	Team Full	Team Full	Team Full	Team Full

- ^1 Lechev used his steal before the winner of the battle was announced as he liked both artists and wanted to steal whoever loses the duel.

== Knockouts ==
The Knockouts started on November 22. The original format used in seasons 6 through 8 returned where the three artists left on the three chairs at the end of the round advanced to the Live shows.

Artist was given a chair and advanced to the Live Shows
Artist was given a chair but was later eliminated in favor of another artist
Artist was eliminated automatically

Knockouts results
Episode	Coach	Order	Artist	Song	Chair given	Artist removed	Final result
Episode 12 (November 22)	Maria	1	Dona Todorova	"Bulgarka"	1	—	Eliminated
Episode 12 (November 22)	Maria	2	Ruslan Kumanov	"Bound To You"	1	—	Eliminated
Episode 12 (November 22)	Maria	3	Martina Gospodinova	"Why Don't You Love Me"	1	—	Advanced
Episode 12 (November 22)	Maria	4	Fransis Karshaliyska	"This World"	3	Dona Todorova	Eliminated
Episode 12 (November 22)	Maria	5	Andrey Manov	"Ledena kralitsa"	Not given	—	Eliminated
Episode 12 (November 22)	Maria	6	Zheni Krincheva	"You Stole the Show"	1	Fransis Karshaliyska	Advanced
Episode 12 (November 22)	Maria	7	Yoanna Yovcheva	"Beat It"	3	Ruslan Kumanov	Eliminated
Episode 12 (November 22)	Maria	8	Trio Deja Vu	"Iskam te"	3	Yoanna Yovcheva	Advanced
Episode 12 (November 22)	Medi	1	Victoria Asenova	"Ain't Nobody"	1	—	Eliminated
Episode 12 (November 22)	Medi	2	Teofil Shabanov	"Mako moya"	2	—	Eliminated
Episode 12 (November 22)	Medi	3	Yasen Korabov	"Tuyo"	3	—	Eliminated
Episode 12 (November 22)	Medi	4	Diana Dimitrova	"Povey vetre"	1	Yasen Korabov	Advanced
Episode 12 (November 22)	Medi	5	Nikola Popov	"You Make Me Feel (Mighty Real)"	1	Teofil Shabanov	Advanced
Episode 12 (November 22)	Medi	6	Angel Nedelchev	"Zaidi, zaidi"	3	Victoria Asenova	Eliminated
Episode 12 (November 22)	Medi	7	Yanitsa Ruseva	"Zabranjeni grad"	Not given	—	Eliminated
Episode 12 (November 22)	Medi	8	Krum Krumov	"Rise Like a Phoenix"	3	Angel Nedelchev	Advanced
Episode 13 (November 29)		1		"[[]]"			
Episode 13 (November 29)		2		"[[]]"			
Episode 13 (November 29)		3		"[[]]"			
Episode 13 (November 29)		4		"[[]]"			
Episode 13 (November 29)		5		"[[]]"			
Episode 13 (November 29)		6		"[[]]"			
Episode 13 (November 29)		7		"[[]]"			
Episode 13 (November 29)		8		"[[]]"			
Episode 13 (November 29)		1		"[[]]"			
Episode 13 (November 29)		2		"[[]]"			
Episode 13 (November 29)		3		"[[]]"			
Episode 13 (November 29)		4		"[[]]"			
Episode 13 (November 29)		5		"[[]]"			
Episode 13 (November 29)		6		"[[]]"			
Episode 13 (November 29)		7		"[[]]"			
Episode 13 (November 29)		8		"[[]]"			

Detailed chairs' changes – Moved to another chair – Eliminated
Coach	Order	Chair 1	Chair 2	Chair 3
Maria	3	Martina Gospodinova	Ruslan Kumanov	Dona Todorova
Maria	4	Martina Gospodinova	Ruslan Kumanov	Fransis Karshaliyska
Maria	6	Zheni Krincheva	Martina Gospodinova	Ruslan Kumanov
Maria	7	Zheni Krincheva	Martina Gospodinova	Yoanna Yovcheva
Maria	8	Zheni Krincheva	Martina Gospodinova	Trio Deja Vu
Medi	3	Victoria Asenova	Teofil Shabanov	Yasen Korabov
Medi	4	Diana Dimitrova	Victoria Asenova	Teofil Shabanov
Medi	5	Nikola Popov	Diana Dimitrova	Victoria Asenova
Medi	6	Nikola Popov	Diana Dimitrova	Angel Nedelchev
Medi	8	Nikola Popov	Diana Dimitrova	Krum Krumov
	3			
	4			
	5			
	6			
	7			
	8			
	3			
	4			
	5			
	6			
	7			
	8			
