= 11 Minutes (film) =

- Theatrical release poster
- Polish: 11 minut
- Directed by: Jerzy Skolimowski
- Written by: Jerzy Skolimowski
- Produced by: Ewa Piaskowska; Jerzy Skolimowski
- Starring: Richard Dormer; Paulina Chapko; Wojciech Mecwaldowski; Andrzej Chyra; Dawid Ogrodnik; Agata Buzek; Piotr Glowacki; Mateusz Kościukiewicz; Ifi Ude; Jan Nowicki; Anna Maria Buczek; Lukasz Sikora
- Cinematography: Mikołaj Łebkowski
- Edited by: Agnieszka Glińska
- Music by: Paweł Mykietyn
- Production companies: Skopia Film; Element Pictures
- Distributed by: Kino Świat (Poland)
- Release dates: 9 September 2015 (Venice); 23 October 2015 (Poland)
- Running time: 81 minutes
- Countries: Poland; Ireland
- Languages: Polish; English
- Box office: $571,697

11 Minutes (

Polish: 11 minut) is a 2015 thriller film written and directed by Jerzy Skolimowski. It stars Richard Dormer, Paulina Chapko, Wojciech Mecwaldowski, Andrzej Chyra, Dawid Ogrodnik, Agata Buzek, Piotr Glowacki, Mateusz Kościukiewicz, Ifi Ude, Jan Nowicki, Anna Maria Buczek, and Lukasz Sikora. Set in Warsaw, it tells the story of multiple people's lives over the course of eleven minutes in a single day. The film had its world premiere in the Competition section at the 72nd Venice International Film Festival on 9 September 2015. It was selected as the Polish entry for the Best Foreign Language Oscar at the 88th Academy Awards, but it was not nominated.

== Plot ==
A contemporary big city and a group of its inhabitants, whose lives are intertwined with each other. The same 11 minutes from the lives of different characters presented in parallel stories: an obsessively jealous husband, his wife-actress, a sneaky Hollywood director, a drug courier, a hot dog vendor with an obscure past, a girl with a beloved dog, a frustrated student on a risky mission, a mountaineer cleaning hotel windows, an ambulance crew, a group of nuns and an old painter. Before the last second of the eleventh minute, their fate is linked by an event that will definitely affect their lives.

== Cast ==
- Richard Dormer as Director Richard Martin
- Paulina Chapko as Anna Hellman
- Wojciech Mecwaldowski as Anna's husband
- Andrzej Chyra as Hot-dog vendor
- Dawid Ogrodnik as Courier
- Agata Buzek as Climber
- Piotr Głowacki as Climber
- Mateusz Kościukiewicz as Ex-boyfriend
- Ifi Ude as Girl with a dog
- Jan Nowicki as Painter
- Anna Maria Buczek as Doctor Ewa Król
- Lukasz Sikora as Boy
- Grażyna Błęcka-Kolska as Pregnant woman
- Janusz Chabior as Dying man

== Production ==
Jerzy Skolimowski described the film as "an answer to the Hollywood action movies." The film was primarily shot in Warsaw. Additional filming took place in Dublin, as well as the Alvernia Studios near Kraków.

== Release ==
The film had its world premiere in the Competition section at the 72nd Venice International Film Festival on 9 September 2015. It was also screened at the Toronto International Film Festival, the BFI London Film Festival, the Gdynia Film Festival, the Geneva International Film Festival, the Lisbon & Estoril Film Festival, the Cork Film Festival, the Camerimage, and the Trieste Film Festival. It was released in Poland on 23 October 2015.

== Reception ==
=== Critical reception ===
On review aggregator website Rotten Tomatoes, the film has an approval rating of 76% based on 21 reviews, and a weighted average rating of 6.2/10. On Metacritic, the film has a score 51 out of 100, based on 12 critics, indicating "mixed or average reviews".

Chuck Bowen of Slant Magazine gave the film 3 out of 4 stars, writing, "The directorial ingenuity of 11 Minutes is so evident and flamboyant that it's tempting to overlook the accomplishments of Skolimowski’s script, which abounds in shorthand and overheated implication." He added, "The film's final Rube Goldberg-ian flourish refutes the banal humanity of many multiple-character studies, convincingly insisting that only death shall bring us together, unifying our vastly differing gulfs of emotional experience." David Rooney of The Hollywood Reporter described the film as "an empty feat of technical virtuosity driven by a bleakly obvious vision of the murky morality of the post-9/11 world."

== Accolades ==
Award	Year of ceremony	Category	Recipient(s)	Result	Ref(s)
Venice Film Festival	2015	Special Mention: Young Jury Members of the Vittorio Veneto Film Festival	11 Minutes	Won	
Lisbon & Estoril Film Festival	2015	Best Film	11 Minutes	Won	
Polish Film Awards	2016	Best Editing	Agnieszka Glińska	Won	
CinEast	2016	Critics Prize	11 Minutes	Won	
European Film Awards	2016	Best Sound Designer	Radosław Ochnio	Won	

== See also ==
- List of submissions to the 88th Academy Awards for Best Foreign Language Film
- List of Polish submissions for the Academy Award for Best Foreign Language Film
