= Glasat na Bulgaria season 11 =

Glasat na Bulgaria
- Season 11
- Promotional poster featuring coaches Ivan Lechev, Dara, Maria Ilieva and Grafa
- Hosted by: Vladimir Zombori; Boryana Bratoeva; Petya Dikova (backstage)
- Coaches: Ivan Lechev; Dara; Maria Ilieva; Grafa
- Winner: Slaveya Ivanova
- Winning coach: Dara
- Runner-up: David Milanov

Release
- Original network: bTV
- Original release: 14 September – 15 December 2024

Season chronology
- ← Previous; Season 10 Next → Season 12

The eleventh season of Bulgarian singing reality competition Glasat na Bulgaria premiered on 14 September 2024. The coaching panel consists of Ivan Lechev, Dara and Maria Ilieva, who returned for their eighth, fourth and second season respectively. Former coach Grafa, who coached between seasons 4 to 7, returned for his fifth season, replacing Miro.

Slaveya Ivanova was crowned as the "voice", marking Dara's second win as a coach. With Ivanova's win, Dara became the third overall and first female coach to win multiple times. Ivanova was the second stolen artist (Ivanova was originally from Maria Ilieva's team before she joined Team Dara) to win the show following Georgi Shopov in the seventh season.

== Coaches and hosts ==
Coaches of Glasat na Bulgaria season eleven

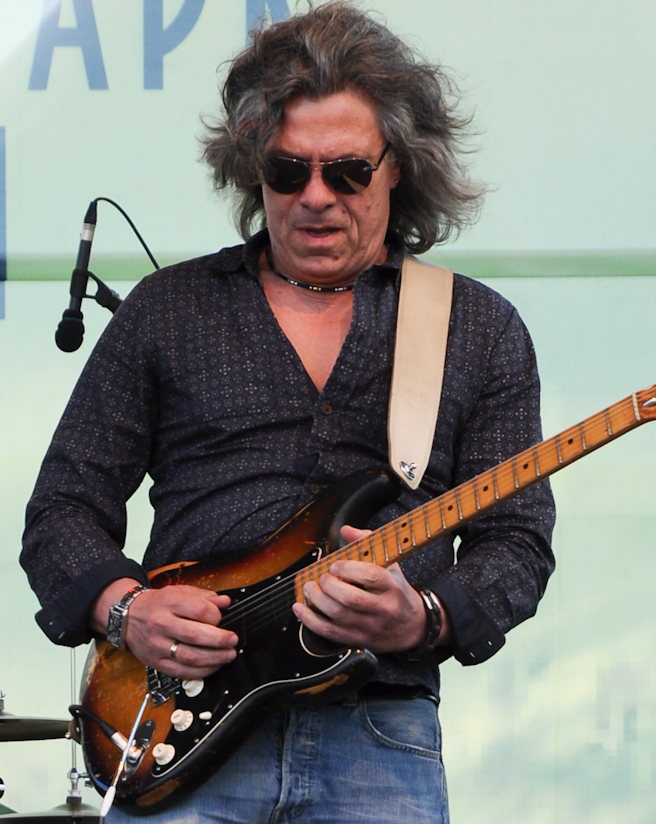
Ivan Lechev

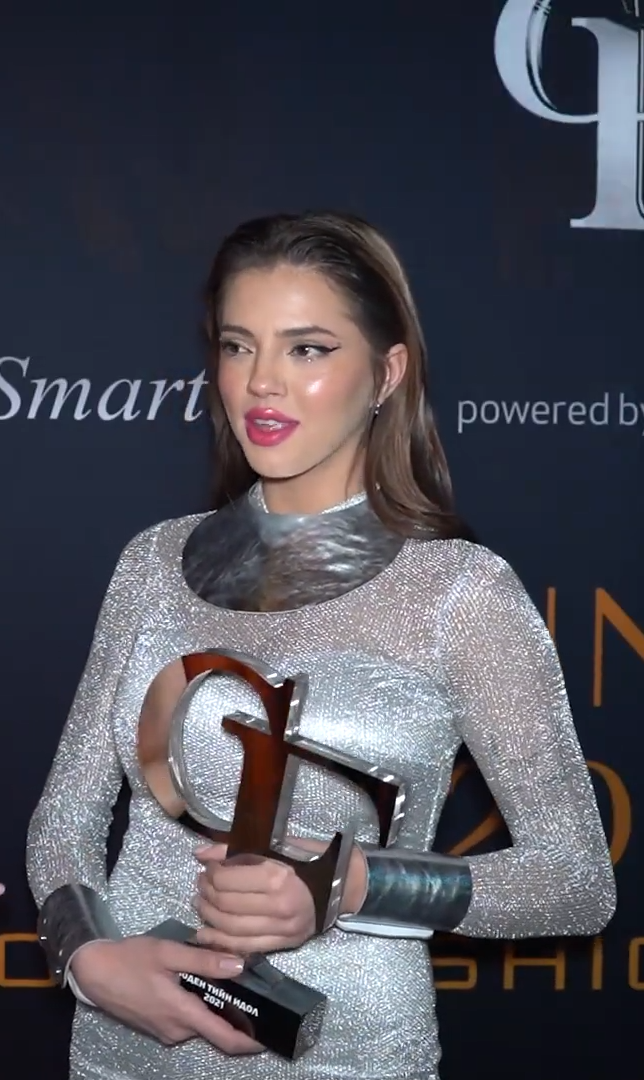
Dara

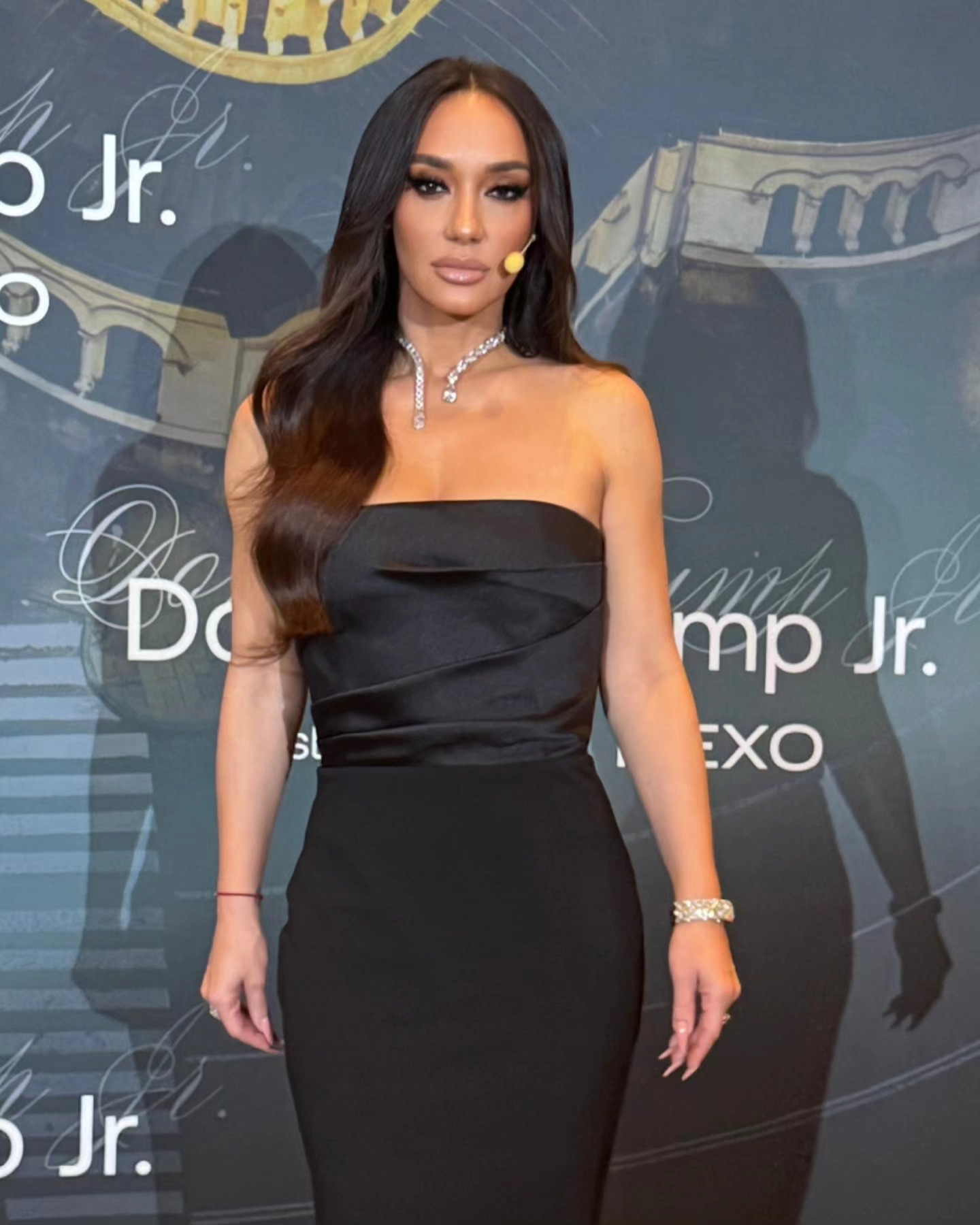
Maria Ilieva

Grafa

The coaches remain the same from the previous season, except Miro was replaced by former coach Grafa. He joins Ivan Lechev, Dara and Maria Ilieva who return from the previous season.

This season introduced new hosts, replacing former host Ivan Tishev. Vladimir Zombori and Boryana Bratoeva were announced to be the hosts for the season. The "V Reporter" returned, as Petya Dikova hosted backstage podcast episodes.

== Teams ==
- Winner
- Runner-up
- Third place
- Fourth place
- Fifth place
- Eliminated in the Live shows
- Stolen in the Knockouts
- Eliminated in the Knockouts
- Stolen in the Battles
- Artist was eliminated after being switched with another stolen artist
- Eliminated in the Battles
- Eliminated in the Final selection

Coaching teams
Coaches	Top 65 Artists				
Ivan Lechev					
Ivan Lechev	Simona Stateva	Yoana Marinova	Victoria Blagoeva	Raya Yovcheva	~~Samuel Manuelyan~~
Ivan Lechev	Nikolina Savova	Antonio Simeonov	Asen Trenchev	Lachezar Katsarski	Diana Vasileva
Ivan Lechev	Angela Crompton	Martina Di Marco	Rosen Petrov	Vladinella Katsarska	Lyudmil Harizanov
Ivan Lechev	Denitsa Kineva	Anastasia Tucheva	Megan Piller	Alek Kirev	Pavel Tetevenski
Dara					
Dara	Slaveya Ivanova	Yordan Petev	Yana Dimitrova	Nedko Geshev	~~Victoria Blagoeva~~
Dara	Ralitsa Haiderska	Kristina Topalova	Dimitar Dragiev	~~Anna Stavreva~~	~~Nikolina Savova~~
Dara	Daniel Georgiev	Konstantin Kandev	Antonia Kundakova	Ivet Yanichkova	Natali Atanasova
Dara	Goran Vasev	Kiril Markov	Filip Filchev	Aneta Danailova	
Maria Ilieva					
Maria Ilieva	David Milanov	Aleksandar Savov	Jacqueline Kostadinova	Maria Mironova	Maria-Stefani Cholakova
Maria Ilieva	Rozalia Zhelyazkova	Bozhidar Mihailov	Sesil Sabri	~~Slaveya Ivanova~~	Yuliana Mur
Maria Ilieva	Margarita Zareva	Georgi Ivanov	Viktoria Stefanova	Ismeralda Elenkova	Khristina Trifonova
Maria Ilieva	Nikolay Ivanov	Videlina Mircheva			
Grafa					
Grafa	Anna Stavreva	Trio Fida	Samuel Manuelyan	Aleksandar Atanasov	~~Jacqueline Kostadinova~~
Grafa	~~Yana Dimitrova~~	Vasko Bozadzhiyn	Anton Kotas	~~Maria-Stefani Cholakova~~	Veselin Karsheliyski
Grafa	Gabriela Galorieva	Aleksandar Aleksandrov	Ivan Kubakov	Emily Dimitrova	Emin Al-Junaid
Grafa	Viki & Entso	Preslava Kalincheva			
Note: Italicized names are stolen artists (names struck through within former teams).

== Blind auditions ==
The rules from the previous season are used again, as coaches could have an unlimited number of contestants on their team and finalize them at the end of the auditions. The blocking system returned from last season where coaches can block another coach only after the audition ended, and their chair will turn to the audience backwards. Each coach is given two super-blocks to use. In this season the Super Pass was introduced. Each coach can press this Button once in the Blind Auditions and while the other coaches get blocked, the contestants goes straight to The Battles.

Blind auditions color key
✔	Coach pressed "I WANT YOU" button
	Artist joined this coach's team
	Artist selected to join this coach's team
	Artist was eliminated as no coach pressed their button
	Artist was, initially, part of the team but was eliminated on the cut round
✘	Coach lost the chance to pitch for this artist after another coach's 'super pass'
✘	Coach pressed "I WANT YOU" button, but was:
	Blocked by Ivan; Blocked by Dara; Blocked by Maria; Blocked by Grafa

=== Episode 1 (14 September) ===
The coaches performed "Mezhduchasie" at the start of the show.

Order	Artist	Song	Coach's and artist's choices			
Order	Artist	Song	Ivan	Dara	Maria	Grafa
1	Simona Stateva	"Po, po, po"	✔	✘	✘	✘
2	Anton Kotas	"Heartbreak Hotel"	—	✔	—	✔
3	Anastasia Andreeva	"You've Got the Love"	—	—	—	—
4	Nedko Geshev	"Beautiful Things"	✔	✔	✔	✔
5	Hristian Uzunov	"Heal the World"	—	—	—	—
6	Sesil Sabri	"Lubov"	—	✔	✔	✔
7	Vladinella Katsarska	"Grozna"	✔	—	—	✔
8	Trayan Kostov	"Creepin'" / "7 DNI" / "Beli noshti"	—	—	—	—
9	Yuliana Mur	"What Was I Made For?"	✔	✔	✔	✔
10	Ivet Yanichkova	"Ne vizhdam"	—	✔	—	—
11	Donna Bangyozova	"Run to You"	—	—	—	—
12	Aleksandar Atanasov	"Back in Black"	✔	✔	✔	✔
13	Trio Fida	"Ayde slushay, slushay"	✘	✘	✘	✔

=== Episode 2 (15 September) ===
Order	Artist	Song	Coach's and artist's choices			
Order	Artist	Song	Ivan	Dara	Maria	Grafa
1	Daniel Georgiev	"Supermodel" / "Smells Like Teen Spirit"	✔	✔	✔	✔
2	Ismeralda Elenkova	"Milo moje, sto te nema"	—	✔	✔	✔
3	Hristian Kanev	"Valerie"	—	—	—	—
4	Maria-Stefani Cholakova	"Jealous"	✔	✘	✘	✔
5	Gotse Markovski	"Lose Yourself"	—	—	—	—
6	Dimitar Dragiev	"Dusha"	—	✔	—	—
7	Raya Yovcheva	"Unstoppable"	✔	✔	—	—
8	Vasko Bozadzhiyn	"Oshte vednazh"	✔	✔	—	✔
9	Antoaneta Kuik	"Heart-Shaped Box"	—	—	—	—
10	Nikolina Savova	"Kalino, kalinche"	✔	✔	✔	✔
11	Viki & Entso	"Let It Go"	—	✔	—	✔
12	Lyaysan Usmanova	"Son Sazynny Uynadyn" / "Lyulyakovi noshti"	—	—	—	—
13	Aleksandar Savov	"Lose Control"	✘	✘	✔	✘

=== Episode 3 (22 September) ===
Order	Artist	Song	Coach's and artist's choices			
Order	Artist	Song	Ivan	Dara	Maria	Grafa
1	Anna Stavreva	"Don't You Worry 'bout a Thing"	✔	✔	✘	✔
2	Georgi Ivanov	"Hello"	✔	✔	✔	✔
3	Maria Aleksandrova	"Nashe lyato"	—	—	—	—
4	Aleksandar Aleksandrov	"Dzhelem, dzhelem"	✔	✔	✔	✔
5	Bozhidara Tsoneva	"Holding Out for a Hero"	—	—	—	—
6	Lachezar Katsarski	"Faith"	✔	—	—	—
7	Kristina Topalova	"It's Oh So Quiet"	✔	✔	✔	✔
8	Nikolay Horozov	"Doktor Ivanov"	—	—	—	—
9	Megan Piller	"Feels Like Home"	✔	—	—	—
10	Viktoria Stefanova	"Vlyubeniyat dzhaz"	—	—	✔	✔
11	Yoana Marinova	"Nobody's Wife"	✔	✔	✔	✔
12	Radoslav Vladimirov	"100 godini"	—	—	—	—
13	Jacqueline Kostadinova	"Ain't No Way"	✔	✘	✘	✔

=== Episode 4 (29 September) ===
Order	Artist	Song	Coach's and artist's choices			
Order	Artist	Song	Ivan	Dara	Maria	Grafa
1	Slaveya Ivanova	"I See Red"	✔	✔	✔	✔
2	Veselin Karsheliyski	"Poison"	✔	✔	✔	✔
3	Natali Atanasova	"Russian Roulette"	—	✔	✔	—
4	Martin Dimitrievski	"God's Country"	—	—	—	—
5	Asen Trenchev	"Skin"	✔	—	—	—
6	Emily Dimitrova	"Neka sme razlichni"	✔	—	—	✔
7	Boris Goranov	"Mercy"	—	—	—	—
8	Maria Mironova	"Beli ruzhi"	—	✔	✔	✔
9	Yordan Petev	"Tough Lover"	✔	✔	—	✔
10	Kalinka Bozhinova	"Flowers"	—	—	—	—
11	Veronika Veleva	"Number of the Beast"	—	—	—	—
12	Samuel Manuelyan	"Walking in Memphis"	✔	—	—	✔
13	Ralitsa Haiderska	"Solamente Tú"	✘	✔	✘	✘

Evgenia Lecheva, Ivan Lechev's wife, made a guest appearance, singing "Tomorrow", and received a four chair turn.

=== Episode 5 (6 October) ===
Order	Artist	Song	Coach's and artist's choices			
Order	Artist	Song	Ivan	Dara	Maria	Grafa
1	Konstantin Kandev	"The Show Must Go On"	✘	✔	✔	✔
2	Margarita Zareva	"Zhena na vsichki vremena"	✔	✔	✔	—
3	Chavdar Ivanov	"Ako si zvezda"	—	—	—	—
4	Angela Crompton	"Dancing On My Own"	✔	✔	✔	✔
5	Antonia Kundakova	"Bad Guy"	—	✔	—	✔
6	Bozhidar Mihailov	"Moga"	✔	—	✔	—
7	Yana Dimitrova	"Lay Me Down"	✔	✔	✘	✔
8	Pavel Tetevenski	"Edna pochti zabravena lyubov"	✔	—	—	—
9	Velizara Tiholova	"Call Out My Name"	—	—	—	—
10	Kiril Markov	"O Sole Mio"	—	✔	—	✔
11	Khristina Trifonova	"Speechless"	✔	✔	✔	—
12	Bilyana Todorova	"What's Up?"	—	—	—	—
13	Rosen Petrov	"Nije ljubav stvar"	✔	—	✘	—
14	Gabriela Galorieva	"Avram Zornitsa dumashe"	✔	✔	—	✔

=== Episode 6 (13 October) ===
Order	Artist	Song	Coach's and artist's choices			
Order	Artist	Song	Ivan	Dara	Maria	Grafa
1	Martina Di Marco	"Halo"	✔	✔	✔	✔
2	Nikolay Ivanov	"Somebody to Love"	✔	—	✔	✔
3	Emin Al-Junaid	"Bruises"	—	—	✔	✔
4	Vyara Atanasova	"Ako utre nyama dnes"	—	—	—	—
5	Goran Vasev	"Smoke on the Water"	—	✔	—	✔
6	Sonya Zlatkova	"Shturche"	—	—	—	—
7	Antonio Simeonov	"Zaydi, zaydi"	✔	—	—	✔
8	Sergio Avakian	"I Need a Dollar"	—	—	—	—
9	Videlina Mircheva	"Dream On"	✔	—	✔	—
10	Ivan Kubakov	"Leftovers"	✔	✔	—	✔
11	Katerina Shilova	"El Talisman"	—	—	—	—
12	Denitsa Kineva	"Ne ti li stiga"	✔	—	—	—
13	David Milanov	"Nadezhda"	—	✔	✔	—
14	Victoria Blagoeva	"Voilà"	✔	✔	✔	✔

Grafa performed "Idvash kam men" during the episode.

=== Episode 7 (20 October) ===
Order	Artist	Song	Coach's and artist's choices			
Order	Artist	Song	Ivan	Dara	Maria	Grafa
1	Rozalia Zhelyazkova	"I'm Every Woman"	✔	✔	✔	✔
2	Adelina Radeva	"Samuray"	—	—	—	—
3	Filip Filchev	"Moy svyat"	✔	✔	—	—
4	Aneta Danailova	"Mako moya"	—	✔	—	—
5	Yordan Marinov	"I See Fire"	—	—	—	—
6	Diana Vasileva	"Svatba prava mali kalkashane"	✔	—	—	—
7	Maria Vidolova	"7 dni"	—	—	—	—
8	Anastasia Tucheva	"Another Love"	✔	✔	—	✔
9	Lyudmil Harizanov	"Gubya te bavno"	✔	—	✔	✔
10	Preslava Kalincheva	"You Are the Reason"	—	—	—	✔
11	Alek Kirev	"Don't Look Back in Anger"	✔	—	—	✔

== Battles ==
The battles begin airing on October 26. The battle advisors for each coach this season were the following: Margarita Hranova for Team Ivan, season 8 and 9 coach Galena for Team Dara, Jivko Petrov for Team Maria, and season 6 runner-up Tino for Team Grafa. The rule about the non-stop steal from the last two seasons was implied.

Battles color key
Artist won the battle
Artist lost the battle but was stolen by another coach
Artist lost the battle and was stolen by another coach, but was later switched with another artist
Artist lost the battle and was eliminated

Battles results
Episode	Order	Coach	Winner	Song	Loser	'Steal' result			
Episode	Order	Coach	Winner	Song	Loser	Ivan	Dara	Maria	Grafa
Episode 8 (26 October)	1	Dara	Nedko Geshev	"Careless Whisper"	Konstantin Kandev	✔	—N/a	—	—
Episode 8 (26 October)	2	Ivan	Simona Stateva	"Unholy"	Vladinella Katsarska	—N/a	—	—	—
Episode 8 (26 October)	3	Maria	Bozhidar Mihailov	"Poveche"	Yuliana Mur	—	—	—N/a	✔
Episode 8 (26 October)	4	Grafa	Jacqueline Kostadinova	"Blaze of Glory"	Emily Dimitrova	—	—	—	—N/a
Episode 8 (26 October)	5	Ivan	Asen Trenchev	"Like a Virgin"	Lachezar Katsarski	—N/a	✔	✔	—
Episode 8 (26 October)	6	Maria	Maria Mironova	"Placheshto surce"	Ismeralda Elenkova	—	—	—N/a	—
Episode 8 (26 October)	7	Dara	Victoria Blagoeva	"Kids"	Daniel Georgiev	—	—N/a	✔	—
Episode 8 (26 October)	8	Grafa	Trio Fida	"Vecherai Rado"	Gabriela Galorieva	✔	—	—	—N/a
Episode 9 (3 November)	1	Grafa	Aleksandar Atanasov	"Fighter"	Veselin Karsheliyski	✔	—	—	—N/a
Episode 9 (3 November)	2	Ivan	Yoana Marinova	"Ako utre nyama dnes"	Rosen Petrov	—N/a	—	—	—
Episode 9 (3 November)	3	Maria	Rozalia Zhelyazkova	"Sisters Are Doin' It for Themselves"	Viktoria Stefanova	—	—	—N/a	—
Episode 9 (3 November)	4	Dara	Ralitsa Haiderska	"Last Kiss"	Ivet Yanichkova	—	—N/a	—	—
Episode 9 (3 November)	5	Grafa	Vasko Bozadzhiyn	"Feel Good Inc."	Ivan Kubakov	—	—	—	—N/a
Episode 9 (3 November)	6	Maria	Aleksandar Savov	"Cryin'"	Margarita Zareva	✔	—	—N/a	—
Episode 9 (3 November)	7	Ivan	Raya Yovcheva	"The Door"	Martina Di Marco	—N/a	—	—	—
Episode 9 (3 November)	8	Dara	Dimitar Dragiev	"Devoiko mari hubava"	Nikolina Savova	✔	—N/a	—	—
Episode 10 (10 November)	1	Dara	Yordan Petev	"It's a Man's Man's Man's World"	Anna Stavreva	✔	—N/a	—	✔
Episode 10 (10 November)	2	Ivan	Antonio Simeonov	"Ludo mlado"	Diana Vasileva	—N/a	—	—	—
Episode 10 (10 November)	3	Maria	David Milanov	"Set Fire to the Rain"	Georgi Ivanov	—	—	—N/a	—
Episode 10 (10 November)	4	Grafa	Yana Dimitrova	"Chui me"	Aleksandar Aleksandrov	—	—	—	—N/a
Episode 10 (10 November)	5	Dara	Kristina Topalova	"All That Jazz"	Antonia Kundakova	—	—N/a	—	—
Episode 10 (10 November)	6	Ivan	Samuel Manuelyan	"Knockin' on Heaven's Door"	Angela Crompton	—N/a	—	—	—
Episode 10 (10 November)	7	Grafa	Anton Kotas	"Photograph"	Maria-Stefani Cholakova	✔	—	✔	—N/a
Episode 10 (10 November)	8	Maria	Sesil Sabri	"Vampire"	Slaveya Ivanova	—	✔	—N/a	✔

Grafa and Maria performed their duet song "Chuvash li me" and the latter's song "Minalo" in episode 8.

== Knockouts ==
The rules for this round were changed again: after each contestant's solo performance, the respective coach will have to decide either the artist qualify for the next round, is directly eliminated, or is sent to the "Danger Zone" – at risk of elimination. Each coach advances three of their own artists, but also have one steal to use across the round for the eliminated contestants or in the "Danger Zone". After all members from one team have concluded their performances, the coach will save a number of artists from the "Danger Zone" to move on to the Playoffs. Contestants who are sent to the "Danger Zone" and not chosen by their coach are eliminated, but have a chance to be saved. Also, each coach set a theme for the songs, but each contestant would choose their song. Grafa's theme was "my dream first single", Dara's theme was "complete surprise", Ivan's theme was "the eternal hits - evergreens from the last 60 plus years of music history" and Maria's theme was "the greatest Bulgarian hits of the 21st century".

Knockouts color key
Artist directly advanced to the Playoffs
Artist was initially eliminated or put in the Danger Zone but was stolen by another coach
Artist was put in the Danger Zone and later advanced to the Playoffs
Artist was put in the Danger Zone and was later eliminated
Artist was dirrectly eliminated

Episode	Coach	Order	Artist	Song	Final Result	'Steal' result			
Episode	Coach	Order	Artist	Song	Final Result	Ivan	Dara	Maria	Grafa
Episode 11 (17 November)	Grafa	1	Anna Stavreva	"Think"	Advanced	—N/a	—N/a	—N/a	—N/a
Episode 11 (17 November)	Grafa	2	Anton Kotas	"Back to Black"	Eliminated	—	—	—	—N/a
Episode 11 (17 November)	Grafa	3	Yana Dimitrova	"Je t'aime"	Stolen by Dara	—	✔	—	—N/a
Episode 11 (17 November)	Grafa	4	Aleksandar Atanasov	"Wanted Dead or Alive"	Advanced	—N/a	Team full	—N/a	—N/a
Episode 11 (17 November)	Grafa	5	Jacqueline Kostadinova	"Ostani tazi nosht"	Stolen by Maria	—	Team full	✔	—N/a
Episode 11 (17 November)	Grafa	6	Vasko Bozadzhiyn	"Shte mi budesh li zhena"	Eliminated	—	Team full	Team full	—N/a
Episode 11 (17 November)	Grafa	7	Trio Fida	"Libe da mi doydesh"	Advanced	—N/a	Team full	Team full	—N/a
Episode 11 (17 November)	Dara	1	Slaveya Ivanova	"Emotions"	Advanced	—N/a	Team full	Team full	—N/a
Episode 11 (17 November)	Dara	2	Dimitar Dragiev	"Zhivey milo moe"	Eliminated	—	Team full	Team full	—
Episode 11 (17 November)	Dara	3	Kristina Topalova	"Onzi"	Eliminated	—	Team full	Team full	—
Episode 11 (17 November)	Dara	4	Nedko Geshev	"Umbrella"	Advanced	—N/a	Team full	Team full	—N/a
Episode 11 (17 November)	Dara	5	Ralitsa Haiderska	"Pray for Me"	Eliminated	—	Team full	Team full	—
Episode 11 (17 November)	Dara	6	Yordan Petev	"Sex on Fire"	Advanced	—	Team full	Team full	—
Episode 11 (17 November)	Dara	7	Victoria Blagoeva	"Zombie"	Stolen by Ivan	✔	Team full	Team full	—
Episode 12 (24 November)	Ivan	1	Yoana Marinova	"Bring Me to Life"	Advanced	Team full	Team full	Team full	—N/a
Episode 12 (24 November)	Ivan	2	Asen Trenchev	"I Got You (I Feel Good)"	Eliminated	Team full	Team full	Team full	—
Episode 12 (24 November)	Ivan	3	Raya Yovcheva	"Sweet Child o' Mine"	Advanced	Team full	Team full	Team full	—N/a
Episode 12 (24 November)	Ivan	4	Antonio Simeonov	"Da se sabudish do men"	Eliminated	Team full	Team full	Team full	—
Episode 12 (24 November)	Ivan	5	Nikolina Savova	"Chernata ovca"	Eliminated	Team full	Team full	Team full	—
Episode 12 (24 November)	Ivan	6	Samuel Manuelyan	"Layla"	Stolen by Grafa	Team full	Team full	Team full	✔
Episode 12 (24 November)	Ivan	7	Simona Stateva	"Take Me to Church"	Advanced	Team full	Team full	Team full	Team full
Episode 12 (24 November)	Maria	1	Aleksandar Savov	"Domino"	Advanced	Team full	Team full	Team full	Team full
Episode 12 (24 November)	Maria	2	Maria Mironova	"Greshnica"	Advanced	Team full	Team full	Team full	Team full
Episode 12 (24 November)	Maria	3	Maria-Stefani Cholakova	"Beautiful Mess"	Eliminated	Team full	Team full	Team full	Team full
Episode 12 (24 November)	Maria	4	David Milanov	"Ubivame s lyubov"	Advanced	Team full	Team full	Team full	Team full
Episode 12 (24 November)	Maria	5	Rozalia Zhelyazkova	"100 prichini"	Eliminated	Team full	Team full	Team full	Team full
Episode 12 (24 November)	Maria	6	Bozhidar Mihailov	"Ne moga da spra da te obicham"	Eliminated	Team full	Team full	Team full	Team full
Episode 12 (24 November)	Maria	7	Sesil Sabri	"Strah ot samota"	Eliminated	Team full	Team full	Team full	Team full

== Live shows ==
=== Playoffs ===
The playoffs aired on 1 December. A total of 16 contestants who advanced from the knockout round performed in this round. From each team, two artists advance to the semi-final from the public vote and one artist advances by the coach's choice with a total of 12 contestants moving to the semi-final.

Playoffs color key
Artist advanced to the semi-final from the public's vote
Artist was chosen by their coach to advance to the semi-final
Artist was eliminated

Playoffs results
Order	Coach	Artist	Song	Result
1	Dara	Yordan Petev	"Crazy in Love"	Dara's choice
2	Grafa	Anna Stavreva	"A Song for You"	Advanced
3	Maria	Aleksandar Savov	"Livin' on a Prayer"	Maria's choice
4	Ivan	Victoria Blagoeva	"Euphoria"	Advanced
5	Maria	Maria Mironova	"Skitnitsa"	Eliminated
6	Grafa	Aleksandar Atanasov	"Bohemian Rhapsody"	Eliminated
7	Dara	Slaveya Ivanova	"Heart Attack"	Advanced
8	Ivan	Raya Yovcheva	"Dancing Queen"	Eliminated
9	Maria	David Milanov	"Dusk Till Dawn"	Advanced
10	Dara	Yana Dimitrova	"I Believe I Can Fly"	Advanced
11	Ivan	Yoana Marinova	"Queen of the Night"	Ivan's choice
12	Grafa	Samuel Manuelyan	"Moy svyat"	Advanced
13	Maria	Jacqueline Kostadinova	"Man in the Mirror"	Advanced
14	Ivan	Simona Stateva	"Chandelier"	Advanced
15	Grafa	Trio Fida	"More trŭgnal yunak"	Grafa's choice
16	Dara	Nedko Geshev	"Da te zhaduvam"	Eliminated

=== Semi-final ===
The semi-final aired on 8 December. A total of 12 contestants who advanced from the playoff round performed in this round. Former coach Orlin Goranov returned as a "super coach" for this round. The five artists with the most public votes advanced to the final.

Due to the results being solely for the artists, it was not guaranteed that each coach would be represented in the final. With the elimination of Marinova, Stateva, and Blagoeva, Ivan Lechev no longer has any artists remaining on his team for the second consecutive season. For the third time in the show's history, a coach's team does not have any artists in the grand finale. With the advancements of Petev and Ivanova, Dara became the second coach in the history of the show to bring two artists to the final for two consecutive seasons, after Galena in season 9, making only the female coaches have this distinction.

Semi-final color key
Artist advanced to the final from the public's vote
Artist was eliminated

Semi-final results
Order	Coach	Artist	Song	Result
1	Grafa	Anna Stavreva	"Born This Way"	Advanced
2	Maria	David Milanov	"Za tebe byah"	Advanced
3	Ivan	Yoana Marinova	"Left Outside Alone"	Eliminated
4	Dara	Yordan Petev	"Purple Rain"	Advanced
5	Ivan	Simona Stateva	"Kakto predi"	Eliminated
6	Maria	Aleksandar Savov	"Sineva"	Eliminated
7	Dara	Yana Dimitrova	"Billie Jean"	Eliminated
8	Grafa	Trio Fida	"Lale li si, zyumbyul li si"	Advanced
9	Grafa	Samuel Manuelyan	"Run to You"	Eliminated
10	Ivan	Victoria Blagoeva	"Un-Break My Heart"	Eliminated
11	Maria	Jacqueline Kostadinova	"Piece of My Heart"	Eliminated
12	Dara	Slaveya Ivanova	"She's Gone"	Advanced

=== Final ===
The final aired on 15 December and was divided into three rounds. First, the five finalists performed with a guest, and then the fifth place was announced. In the second round, the four finalists remaining performed alone and the fourth place was then revealed. Finally, the Top 3 performed alone again, followed by the winner announcement.

During the episode, the show paid tribute to former coach Kiril Marichkov who died as a result of a fall two months earlier.

Final results
Round	Order	Coach	Artist	Song	Result
One (Duet with guest)	1	Dara	Yordan Petev (with Mihaela Marinova)	"Die with a Smile"	Top 4
One (Duet with guest)	2	Grafa	Anna Stavreva (with Dicho)	"One"	Top 4
One (Duet with guest)	3	Dara	Slaveya Ivanova (with Toma Zdravkov)	"Enjoy the Silence"	Top 4
One (Duet with guest)	4	Maria	David Milanov (with Santra)	"Bez teb"	Top 4
One (Duet with guest)	5	Grafa	Trio Fida (with Mihaela Fileva)	"Prilivi i otlivi"	Fifth place
Two (Song by the contestant's choice)	1	Grafa	Anna Stavreva	"Ustrem"	Fourth place
Two (Song by the contestant's choice)	2	Dara	Yordan Petev	"We Can't Be Friends (Wait for Your Love)"	Top 3
Two (Song by the contestant's choice)	3	Maria	David Milanov	"Hallelujah"	Top 3
Two (Song by the contestant's choice)	4	Dara	Slaveya Ivanova	"Never Enough"	Top 3
Three (Song by the public's choice)	1	Dara	Yordan Petev	"Earth Song"	Third place
Three (Song by the public's choice)	2	Maria	David Milanov	"Galabo"	Runner-up
Three (Song by the public's choice)	3	Dara	Slaveya Ivanova	"Adagio"	Winner

== Elimination chart ==
Artist's info

- Team Ivan
- Team Dara
- Team Maria
- Team Grafa

Result details

- Winner
- Runner-up
- Third place
- Fourth place
- Fifth place
- Saved by the public
- Saved by their coach
- Eliminated

Results per week
Artists	Week 1 Playoffs	Week 2 Semi-final	Week 3 Final
Slaveya Ivanova	Safe	Safe	Winner
David Milanov	Safe	Safe	Runner-up
Yordan Petev	Safe	Safe	Third place
Anna Stavreva	Safe	Safe	Fourth place
Trio Fida	Safe	Safe	Fifth place
Yoana Marinova	Safe	Eliminated	Eliminated (Week 2)
Simona Stateva	Safe	Eliminated	Eliminated (Week 2)
Aleksandar Savov	Safe	Eliminated	Eliminated (Week 2)
Yana Dimitrova	Safe	Eliminated	Eliminated (Week 2)
Samuel Manuelyan	Safe	Eliminated	Eliminated (Week 2)
Victoria Blagoeva	Safe	Eliminated	Eliminated (Week 2)
Jacqueline Kostadinova	Safe	Eliminated	Eliminated (Week 2)
Maria Mironova	Eliminated	Eliminated (Week 1)	
Aleksandar Atanasov	Eliminated	Eliminated (Week 1)	
Raya Yovcheva	Eliminated	Eliminated (Week 1)	
Nedko Geshev	Eliminated	Eliminated (Week 1)	

=== Per team ===
Artists	Week 1 Playoffs	Week 2 Semi-final	Week 3 Final
Yoana Marinova	Safe	Eliminated	
Simona Stateva	Safe	Eliminated	
Victoria Blagoeva	Safe	Eliminated	
Raya Yovcheva	Eliminated		
Slaveya Ivanova	Safe	Safe	Winner
Yordan Petev	Safe	Safe	Third place
Yana Dimitrova	Safe	Eliminated	
Nedko Geshev	Eliminated		
David Milanov	Safe	Safe	Runner-up
Aleksandar Savov	Safe	Eliminated	
Jacqueline Kostadinova	Safe	Eliminated	
Maria Mironova	Eliminated		
Anna Stavreva	Safe	Safe	Fourth place
Trio Fida	Safe	Safe	Fifth place
Samuel Manuelyan	Safe	Eliminated	
Aleksandar Atanasov	Eliminated		
