= Agata Buzek =

Polish actress and model (born 1976)

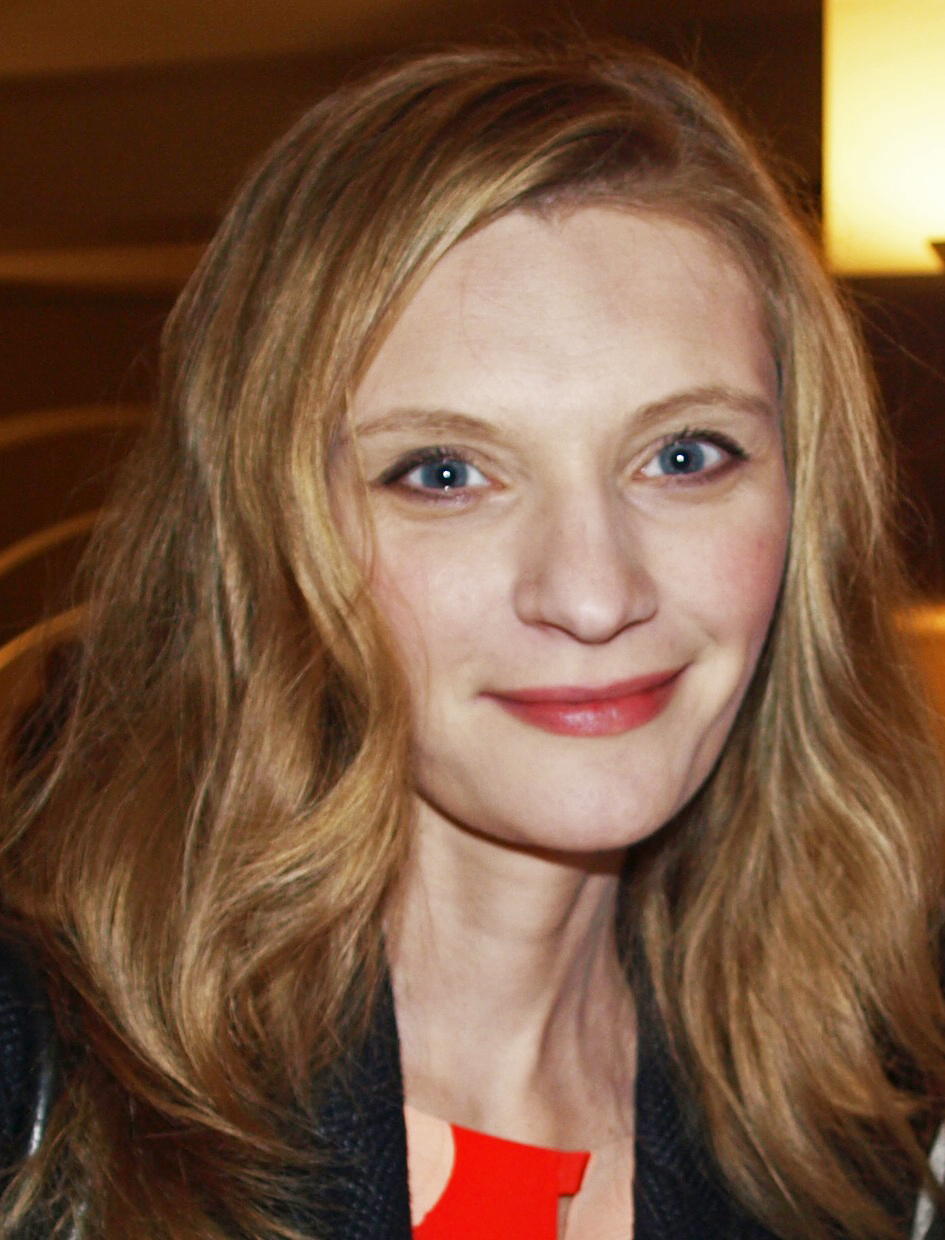
- Buzek in 2018
- Born: Agata Bronisława Buzek; 20 September 1976 (age 49); Pyskowice, Poland
- Occupations: Actress, model
- Years active: 1998–present
- Spouse: Adam Mazan (m. 2006)
- Parent(s): Jerzy Buzek; Ludgarda Buzek

Agata Bronisława Buzek (born 20 September 1976) is a Polish actress and model. She began her career appearing in films The Ballad of the Windshield Washers (1998), The Gateway of Europe (1999), The Hexer (2001) and The Revenge (2002), receiving Polish Academy Award for Best Supporting Actress nomination for latter.

Buzek received Polish Academy Award for Best Actress and Shooting Stars Award for her role in the 2009 comedy-drama film, Reverse. She won her second Polish Academy Award for Best Actress for performance in the 2021 comedy-drama film, My Wonderful Life. Buzek starred in a various internationally-produced films, such as Nightwatching (2007), Hummingbird (2013), The Innocents (2016), High Life (2018), After Blue (2021) and Dovbush (2023).

== Early life ==
Buzek, the daughter of Polish politician, former Prime Minister of Poland and President of the European Parliament Jerzy Buzek, was born in Pyskowice in Gliwice County, Poland. At an early age she had poliomyelitis and was treated in Germany. After studying at a theatre academy in Warsaw, she went to Paris where she worked as a model.

== Career ==
Buzek made her screen debut appearing in the 1998 Italian drama film The Ballad of the Windshield Washers and the following year co-starred opposite Kinga Preis and Alicja Bachleda-Curuś in the historical drama film, The Gateway of Europe. She appeared in the 2001 fantasy film The Hexer and reprised her role in the television series the following year. In 2002 she appeared in the comedy film The Revenge, directed by Andrzej Wajda. She guest-starred in the German television series Tatort and Polizeiruf 110, and co-starred in the drama film, Within the Whirlwind (2009).

In 2009, Buzek received Shooting Stars Award at the 60th Berlin International Film Festival for her performance in the comedy-drama film, Reverse. The film and her performance was well-received by international critics. She also received Polish Film Festival Award for Best Actress, and the Polish Academy Award for Best Actress. In 2013 she made her American film debut starring opposite Jason Statham in the action crime drama Hummingbird. She starred in Polish films Fotograf (2014), Performer (2015) and 11 Minutes (2015).

In 2016, Buzek starred alongside Lou de Laâge and Agata Kulesza in the drama film The Innocents receiving Polish Academy Award nomination for Best Supporting Actress. She received another Best Supporting Actress nomination for performance in A Coach's Daughter (2018). In 2018 she co-starred in the science fiction horror film High Life directed by Claire Denis. She later appeared in the Polish crime drama Dark, Almost Night (2019), a French romantic comedy White as Snow (2019), the German thriller Sleep (2020), the Latvian drama The Pit (2020), the Polish Netflix drama Erotica 2022 (2020), and the French drama Dune Dreams (2021). In 2021 she won her second Polish Academy Award for Best Actress for performance in the comedy-drama film, My Wonderful Life. In 2022 she starred in the psychological drama film Illusion for Netflix. In 2023 she starred in the action fantasy film She Is Conann and the historical adventure film, Dovbush.

== Filmography ==
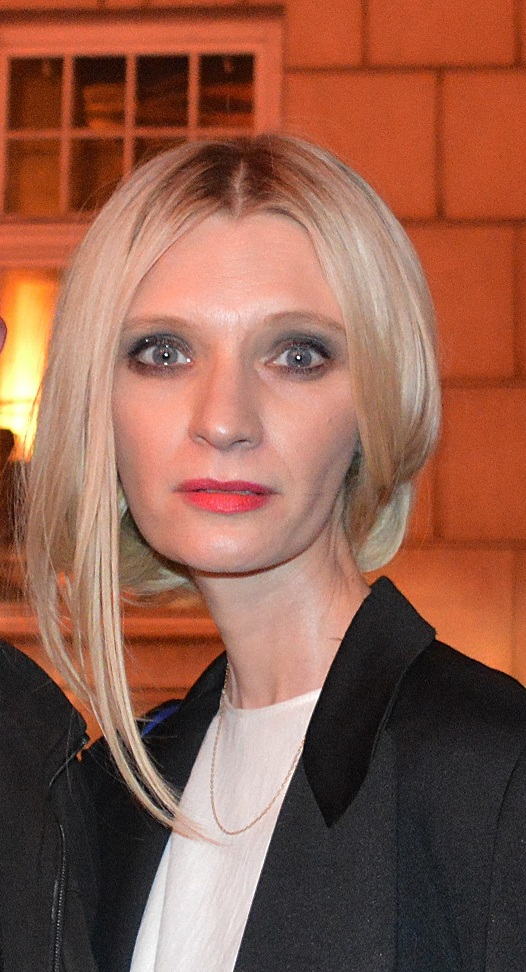
Buzek (2018)

Year	Title	Role	Notes
1998	Love Me and Do Whatever You Want	Larysa Kwitkowska	
1998	The Ballad of the Windshield Washers	Justyna	
1999	The Gateway of Europe	Henrietta	
2001	The Hexer	Pavetta	
2002	The Supplement	fashion model	
2002	The Revenge	Klara Raptusiewiczówna	Nominated — Polish Academy Award for Best Supporting Actress
2006	Valerie	Valerie Adamczyk	
2007	Rys	Rybik	
2007	Nightwatching	Titia Uylenburgh	
2009	Within the Whirlwind	Lena	
2009	Reverse	Sabina Jankowska	Polish Academy Award for Best Actress; Shooting Stars Award at the 60th Berlin International Film Festival; Polish Film Festival Award for Best Actress; Złota Kaczka Award for Best Actress
2011	Father, Son & Holy Cow	Anna	
2011	Lena	Danka	
2012	In a Bedroom	Klaudia	
2013	Hummingbird	Sister Cristina	
2014	Foreign Body	Katarzyna	
2014	Fotograf	Kasia Przybylska	
2014	Jeziorak	Wilhelmina	
2015	11 Minutes	Climber	
2015	Performer	Owner	
2016	The Innocents	Sister Maria	Nominated — Polish Academy Award for Best Supporting Actress
2017	The Man with the Magic Box	Doctor	
2018	A Coach's Daughter	Kamila	Nominated — Polish Academy Award for Best Supporting Actress
2018	Pearl	Serena	
2018	High Life	Nansen	
2019	Dark, Almost Night	Anna Lipiec	
2019	White as Snow	La femme slave	
2019	I Am Lying Now	Kai	
2020	Sleep	Trude	
2020	The Pit	Smaida	
2020	Erotica 2022	Mrs B	
2021	Dune Dreams	Claudia	
2021	After Blue	Kate Bush	
2021	My Wonderful Life	Joanna Lisiecka	Polish Academy Award for Best Actress
2022	Illusion	Hanna	
2023	Dovbush	Yablonowska	
2023	She Is Conann	Conann 45	
TBA	Leaving Eden	Nadi	Post-production
