= Madeleine Pauliac =

French medical doctor and Resistance member

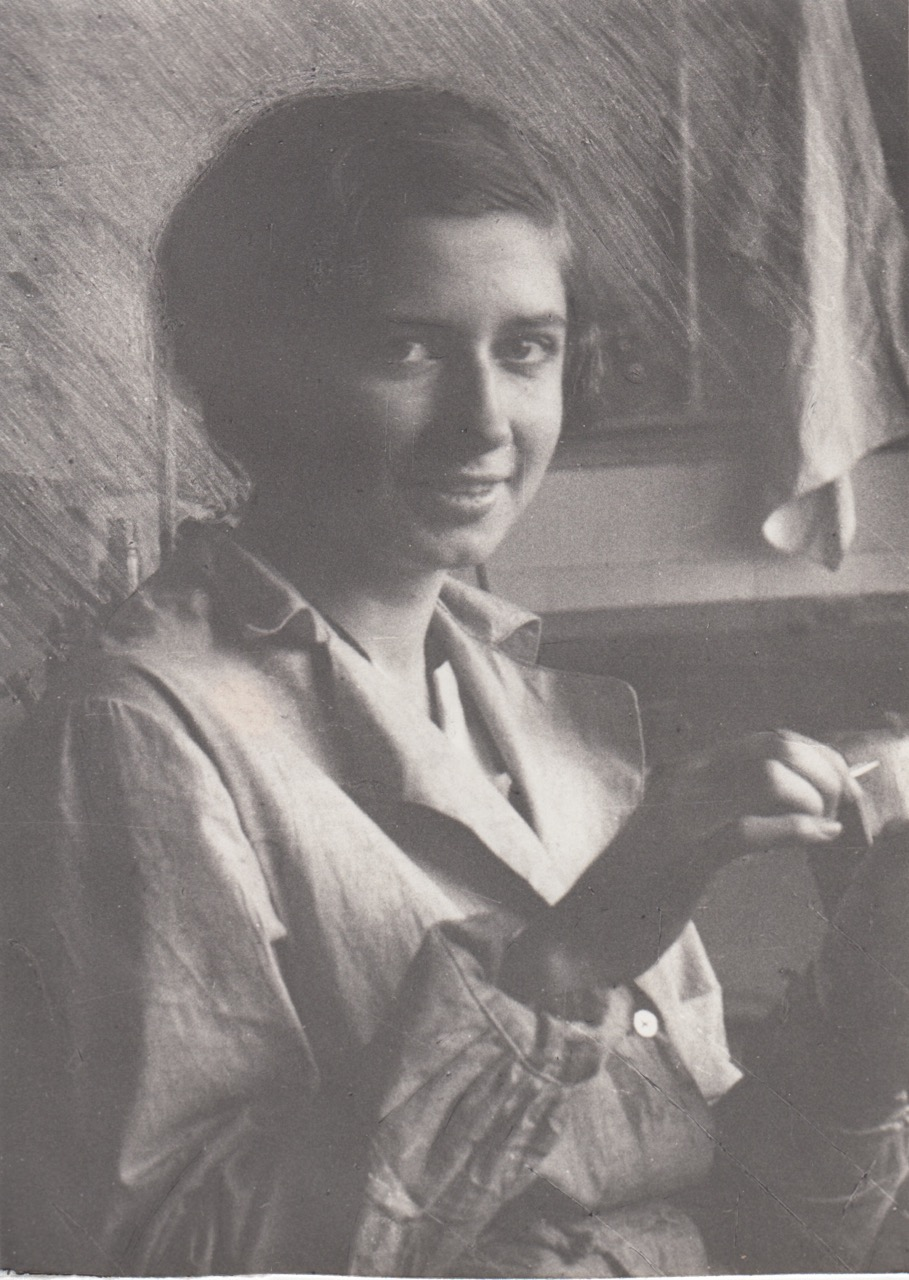
- Pauliac in 1931
- Born: 17 September 1912; Villeneuve-sur-Lot, France
- Died: 13 February 1946 (aged 33); Sochaczew, Poland

Madeleine Jeanne Marie Pauliac (17 September 1912 – 13 February 1946) was a French medical doctor and a member of the French Resistance. Her experience in post-World War II Poland formed the basis for the movie Les Innocentes.

== Life ==
Pauliac was born in Villeneuve-sur-Lot. Pauliac's father, Roger Pauliac, died in 1916 in the Battle of Verdun. She wrote her thesis on the action of sulfamide derivatives in the treatment of cerebrospinal meningitis. At age 27, Pauliac was a hospital doctor in Paris. She became involved in the Résistance by supplying the French underground organization. She then took part in the Liberation of Paris and the campaign of the Vosges and Alsace.

In early 1945, as a medical lieutenant in the French military, Pauliac left for Moscow under the authority of General Catroux, Ambassador of France to Russia. On April 19, Pauliac was appointed chief doctor of the hospital of Warsaw, which was in ruins. She became responsible for the repatriation mission at the head of the French Red Cross. She performed more than 200 missions throughout Poland and the Soviet Union with the Blue Squadron, a unit of women ambulance volunteers of the French Red Cross (Croix Rouge), whose role was to search for, care for and repatriate the French who remained in Poland. On June 19, 1945, Pauliac wrote and sent a report on her trip to Danzig to Étienne Burin des Roziers, chief of staff to Général de Gaulle, to which the recipient responded on August 25, 1945.

Pauliac died in an automobile accident on 13 February 1946 in Sochaczew near Warsaw. She is buried in the Saint-Étienne cemetery of Villeneuve-sur-Lot, France. Pauliac was posthumously awarded the National Order of the Legion d'Honneur with the rank of knight of the Croix de guerre 1939–1945 (France).

== Feature film ==
The feature film Les Innocentes, directed by Anne Fontaine, from an original idea by Philippe Maynial (Pauliac's nephew), is based on Pauliac's experiences during her mission in Poland. The film was part of the official selection of the Sundance Film Festival in January 2016. The French national release was scheduled in theaters on February 10, 2016.
