= The Innocents (2016 film) =

- Theatrical release poster
- Directed by: Anne Fontaine
- Written by: Sabrina B. Karine; Pascal Bonitzer; Anne Fontaine; Alice Vial
- Based on: an original concept by Philippe Maynial
- Produced by: Éric Altmayer; Nicolas Altmayer; Philippe Carcassonne
- Starring: Lou de Laâge; Agata Kulesza; Agata Buzek; Vincent Macaigne
- Cinematography: Caroline Champetier
- Edited by: Annette Dutertre
- Music by: Grégoire Hetzel
- Production companies: Aeroplan Film; France 2 Cinéma; Mandarin Cinéma; Mars Films; Scope Pictures
- Distributed by: Mars Distribution (France)
- Release dates: 26 January 2016 (Sundance); 10 February 2016 (France)
- Running time: 115 minutes
- Countries: France; Poland; Belgium
- Languages: French; Polish; Dutch; Russian
- Budget: $6.4 million
- Box office: $7.4 million

The Innocents (French: Les Innocentes), also known as Agnus Dei, is a 2016 drama film directed by Anne Fontaine that features Lou de Laâge, Agata Kulesza, Agata Buzek and Vincent Macaigne. The script is by Sabrina B. Karine, Pascal Bonitzer, Fontaine and Alice Vial, after an original idea by Philippe Maynial. Maynial took inspiration from the experiences of his aunt, Madeleine Pauliac, a French Red Cross doctor who worked in Poland after World War II.

== Plot ==
In Warsaw, December 1945, a nun known as Sister Teresa approaches a young French female student doctor, Mathilde Beaulieu, serving with an army unit. She says there are sick women in need and is not satisfied with a referral to the Polish Red Cross.

Beaulieu decides to go at night to the nun's convent, where one woman has given birth. The Mother Superior (Abbess) tells her that the nun was thrown out by her family and was taken in out of charity. Beaulieu tells the Mother Superior that she works for the French Red Cross. A novice nun at the convent is grieving the death of another nun. Confined to her cell, she engages in morning prayer.

Later the Abbess discloses to Beaulieu that several nuns at the convent were raped first by German soldiers and later also by Soviet soldiers, relating that the experience was nightmarish, and they wish to keep this a secret to save the convent's reputation. Seven of the nuns are pregnant. Some of the pregnant nuns are reluctant to be examined intimately by the doctor, believing this will violate their vow of chastity. One of the nuns confesses to Mother Superior that her faith has been deeply shaken by these events.

Soldiers come to the convent believing the nuns are harboring an enemy soldier. However, Beaulieu convinces them she is there to deal with an emergency outbreak of typhus. The Mother Superior is badly shaken by the threat of the soldiers, and thanks the doctor for her presence of mind. Beaulieu realizes that she too was raped. The Mistress of Novices, Sister Maria, tells the doctor that every day she is reminded of these harsh events. She relates how faith has become more difficult for her, but it is the cross she bears. When Beaulieu returns to headquarters, her boss chastises her for having been away without leave. He says that the military is a place of order and discipline.

During a later visit to the convent, Beaulieu is present when another novice nun gives birth unexpectedly. This nun had not realized she was pregnant and does not seem to know she has given birth. The Abbess had given orders that she be notified of all births, but Beaulieu requests that she not be notified immediately. The doctor needs to focus on care for the newborn. A different nun, Sister Zofia, takes responsibility for the child.

Beaulieu asks the Mistress of Novices if she ever regrets her life as a nun. The novice replies, "Faith is 24 hours of doubt with one minute of hope", going on to describe her difficulties with the practice. Beaulieu returns to the army medical unit, and discovers the unit is going to be transferred out of the area.

Several nuns are about to give birth at once. Beaulieu returns to the convent with a male Jewish colleague. She assures the nuns that he will keep their secret. The doctor visits the baby whose existence has been kept secret from the Abbess. The Mistress of Novices plans to take the baby to Zofia's family, but the baby is discovered by the Abbess. The Abbess is upset that she was lied to and tells the Mistress of Novices that she has been corrupted by "that French woman", who has brought scandal and disorder to the convent. The Mistress of Novices replies, "Forgive me, but scandal and disorder were already here".

The Mother Superior has been telling everyone that she takes the babies to families who have agreed to adopt, but she abandons this baby in front of a crucifix on a country walking path, after baptizing it. Zofia is distraught, knowing the child is missing. The Mother Superior privately prays for the courage to continue on the path she has chosen. Meanwhile, Zofia commits suicide by jumping from an upper ledge, dying shortly after her wounded body is discovered.

When the Mistress of Novices goes to Zofia's family to report her death, she discovers that Zofia's aunt never knew Zofia had a child, nor that she had been caring for another baby. The Mistress of Novices decides to not tell the aunt the truth. This is the Mistress of Novices' first realization that the Abbess has been dishonest about the fate of the babies. She confronts the Abbess demanding the truth. She says she entrusted the child to God, saying "Don't you believe in Providence?".

At the medical base, Beaulieu is getting ready to finally leave the area. The Mistress of Novices brings three babies to the base to protect them from the Abbess. Beaulieu notices that many orphans living on the street have been helping personnel at the base from time to time. It occurs to her that the nuns could start raising many of these children and open an orphanage, thus avoiding questions about where the babies are coming from. One of the nuns decides to leave the convent and raise her own child, and another decides to leave, but allow her baby to be raised by the nuns.

The final scene is three months later, with a photographer at the convent taking pictures of the nuns and happy orphans.

== Cast ==
- Lou de Laâge as Mathilde Beaulieu
- Agata Buzek as Sister Maria
- Agata Kulesza as Mother Superior
- Vincent Macaigne as Samuel
- Joanna Kulig as Sister Irena
- Katarzyna Dąbrowska as Sister Anna
- Thomas Coumans as Gaspard
- Eliza Rycembel as Teresa
- Anna Próchniak as Zofia
- Pascal Elso as The colonel

== Production ==
The film is a French-Polish-Belgian co-production that was supported by the Polish Film Institute and the Film Commission Poland. The film received approximately €436,000 / zł1.8 m from the PFI. Principal photography began on 13 January 2015 in the Warmia region in Poland, and lasted for seven weeks. The film premiered at the Sundance Film Festival in January 2016. In some countries the film is titled Agnus Dei (Latin for "God's lamb", or "lamb of God", from the Mass liturgy). At the time of its release in France, the film had been sold to around twenty countries with this title.

The screenplay is based on the true story of Madeleine Pauliac, a Resistance fighter and chief physician at the French Hospital in Warsaw: "The young French Red Cross doctor who discovered the state of this convent left a private diary, and it was through her nephew, Philippe Maynial—who lives in France—that these events came to light," revealed Anne Fontaine. Pauliac died the following year in a car accident at the age of 33, and the film is dedicated to her memory. To prepare for the film, the director—a believer but not a practicing Catholic, with aunts who had joined religious orders—undertook two retreats at Benedictine convents.

== Reception ==
=== Box office ===
In France, the film had 702,040 admissions. Outside of France, it had 675,229 admissions. The film made $7.4 million in total.

=== Critical response ===
On review aggregator Rotten Tomatoes, the film has a rating of 95%, based on 114 reviews, with an average rating of 7.6/10. The site's critical consensus reads, "The Innocents isn't always easy to watch, but its nuanced exploration of complex themes -- and its refreshing perspective -- are well worth the effort." Metacritic, which assigns a weighted average score from 1 to 100 with respect to reviews from mainstream critics, reports a score of 78 out of 100, based on 23 critics, indicating "generally favorable reviews ".

=== Accolades ===
Award / Film Festival	Category	Recipients and nominees	Result
Australian Film Critics Association	Best International Film (Foreign Language)	The Innocents	Nominated
César Awards	Best Film		Nominated
César Awards	Best Director	Anne Fontaine	Nominated
César Awards	Best Original Screenplay	Sabrina B. Karine, Alice Vial, Pascal Bonitzer and Anne Fontaine	Nominated
César Awards	Best Cinematography	Caroline Champetier	Nominated
Norwegian International Film Festival	Andreas Award		Won
Provincetown International Film Festival	Audience Award		Won
Valladolid International Film Festival	FIPRESCI Prize		Won
AusCritic Awards	Best Foreign Language Film		Nominated
Chlotrudis Society for Independent Films	Best Cinematography	Caroline Champetier	Nominated
Polish Film Awards	Best Supporting Actress	Agata Buzek	Nominated
Polish Film Awards	Best Set Design	Joanna Macha	Nominated
Seattle International Film Festival	Golden Space Needle for Best Director	Anne Fontaine	Nominated
Seattle International Film Festival	Golden Space Needle for Best Actress	Lou de Laâge	Nominated
Seattle Film Critics Society	Best Film Not in the English Language		Nominated
Jerusalem Film Festival	"In Spirit for Freedom" Award – Best Film		Nominated
