= The Pit (2020 film) =

2020 film

- Film poster
- Directed by: Dace Pūce
- Starring: Damir Onackis
- Release date: 4 November 2020
- Running time: 90 minutes
- Country: Latvia
- Language: Latvian

The Pit (Latvian: Bedre) is a 2020 Latvian drama film directed by Dace Pūce. It was selected as the Latvian entry for the Best International Feature Film at the 94th Academy Awards.

== Plot ==
After she makes disparaging remarks about his father, a ten-year-old boy tricks a girl into falling into a pit.

== Cast ==
- Damir Onackis as Markuss
- Luize Birkenberga as Emilija
- Indra Burkovska as Sailor
- Agata Buzek as Smaida
- Egons Dombrovskis as Roberts

== See also ==
- List of submissions to the 94th Academy Awards for Best International Feature Film
- List of Latvian submissions for the Academy Award for Best International Feature Film
