= Villeneuve-sur-Lot =

- Subprefecture and commune
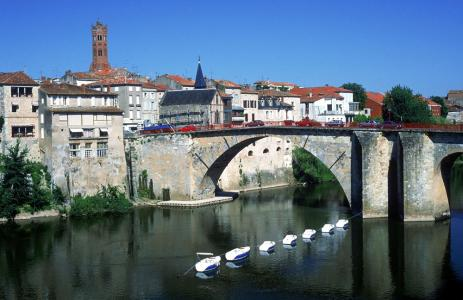
- Bridge over the river Lot

- Coat of arms
- Location of Villeneuve-sur-Lot
- Location within France Location within Nouvelle-Aquitaine
- Coordinates: 44°24′29″N 0°42′18″E
- Country: France
- Region: Nouvelle-Aquitaine
- Department: Lot-et-Garonne
- Arrondissement: Villeneuve-sur-Lot
- Canton: Villeneuve-sur-Lot-1 and 2
- Intercommunality: CA Grand Villeneuvois

Government
  - Mayor (2024–2026): Gérard Régnier
- Area^{1}: 81.32 km^{2} (31.40 sq mi)
- Elevation: 55 m (180 ft)
- Highest elevation: 209 m (686 ft)
- Lowest elevation: 42 m (138 ft)
- Population (2023): 22,350
  - Density: 274.8/km^{2} (711.8/sq mi)
- Time zone: UTC+01:00 (CET)
  - Summer (DST): UTC+02:00 (CEST)
- INSEE/Postal code: 47323 /47300
- ^{1} French Land Register data, which excludes lakes, ponds, glaciers > 1 km^{2} (0.386 sq mi or 247 acres) and river estuaries.

Villeneuve-sur-Lot (French pronunciation: [vilnœv syʁ lɔt]; in the Languedocien dialect of Occitan language: Vilanuèva d'Òlt [bilaˈnwɛβɔ ˈðult]) is a town and commune in the southwestern French department of Lot-et-Garonne. The commune was formerly named Villeneuve-d'Agen.

Villeneuve-sur-Lot is located 22 km northeast of the commune of Agen and straddles the river Lot.

== History ==
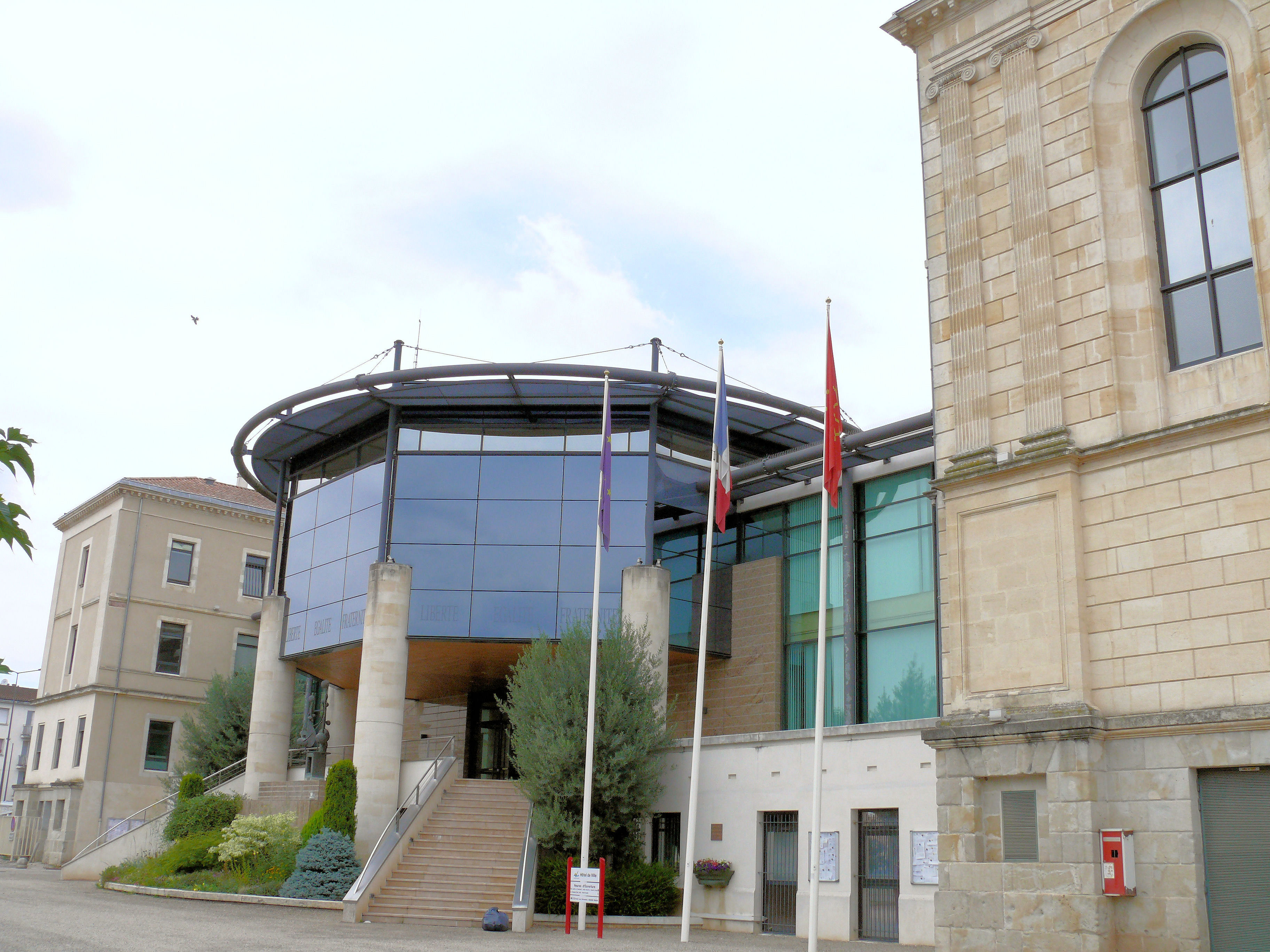
The Hôtel de Ville

Villeneuve was founded in 1254 by Alphonse, Count of Poitiers, brother of Louis IX, on the site of the town of Gajac, which had been deserted during the Albigensian Crusade.

The Hôtel de Ville was completed in 1847.

By the early 20th century, Villeneuve-sur-Lot was an important agricultural centre and had a large trade in plums (prunes d'ente); the preparation of preserved plums and the tinning of peas and beans were major industries. The important mill of Gajac stood on the bank of the Lot a little above the town.

== Population ==
Historical population

Year	Pop.	±% p.a.
1793	10,125	—
1800	9,600	−0.76%
1806	10,727	+1.87%
1821	9,211	−1.01%
1831	10,652	+1.46%
1836	11,222	+1.05%
1841	12,337	+1.91%
1846	13,088	+1.19%
1851	13,212	+0.19%
1856	13,834	+0.92%
1861	13,830	−0.01%
1866	13,114	−1.06%
1872	13,681	+0.71%
1876	14,448	+1.37%
1881	14,560	+0.15%
1886	14,693	+0.18%
1891	13,798	−1.25%
1896	13,561	−0.35%
1901	13,594	+0.05%

Year	Pop.	±% p.a.
1906	13,540	−0.08%
1911	13,181	−0.54%
1921	11,350	−1.48%
1926	12,047	+1.20%
1931	12,197	+0.25%
1936	12,655	+0.74%
1946	17,055	+3.03%
1954	15,784	−0.96%
1962	17,295	+1.15%
1968	21,682	+3.84%
1975	22,307	+0.41%
1982	23,045	+0.47%
1990	22,782	−0.14%
1999	22,782	+0.00%
2007	23,436	+0.35%
2012	23,377	−0.05%
2017	22,064	−1.15%
2023	22,350	+0.21%

Source: EHESS and INSEE (1968–2023)

== Sights ==
The main quarter of the town is located on the right bank of the Lot River and is linked to the quarter on the left bank by a bridge from the 13th century, the principal arch of which, constructed during the reign of Louis XIII in place of two older arches, has a span of 36 metres (118 ft) and a height of 18 metres (59 ft). On the left bank, portions of the 13th century ramparts, altered and surmounted by machicolations of the 15th century, remain, and high square towers rise above the gates to the north-east and southwest, known respectively as the Porte de Paris and Porte de Pujols.

On the right bank, boulevards have for the most part taken the place of the ramparts. Arcades of the 13th century surround the Place La Fayette, and monumental houses of the 13th, 14th and 15th centuries are to be seen in various parts of the town. The church of St Etienne is late Gothic style. On the left bank of the Lot, 3 km S.S.W. of Villeneuve, are the 13th-century walls of Pujols located.

The buildings of the former abbey of Eysses, about 2 km to the N.E., are mainly from the 17th century and serve as a departmental prison and penitentiary settlement. The principal hospital, the hospice St Cyr, is a building surrounded by gardens.

The Pont De La Liberation, which spans the Lot river, is a 96.2-metre (316 ft) arch bridge built between 1910 and 1919. When it was completed it was the largest single span concrete arch in the world. It was designed by Eugène Freyssinet, one of the pioneers in using reinforced concrete.

== Representations in popular culture ==
The principal action of the feature film Wild Reeds (1994) directed by André Téchiné is set in Villeneuve-sur-Lot in 1962.

== Notable people ==
- Mikaël Brageot (born 1987), pilot, Red Bull Air Race competitor
- Benoît Broutchoux (1879–1944), anarchist
- Nicolas Cazalé (born 1977), actor
- Charles Derennes (1882–1930), writer, winner of the 1924 edition of the Prix Femina
- Georges Leygues (1857–1933), politician of the Third Republic
- Madeleine Pauliac (1912-1946), medical doctor and member French Resistance
- Caroline Paulus (born 1959), actress, fashion model and singer
- Ousmane Dieng (born 2003), NBA basketball player

== Twin towns – sister cities ==
Villeneuve-sur-Lot is twinned with:

- Ávila, Spain
- Bouaké, Ivory Coast
- Neustadt bei Coburg, Germany
- San Donà di Piave, Italy
- Troon, Scotland

== See also ==
- US Villeneuve, a rugby league club from Villeneuve-sur-Lot
- In Villeneuve-sur-Lot's town hall there is a bust of Marianne by Georges Saupique
