= The Ballad of the Windshield Washers =

1998 film

- Directed by: Peter Del Monte
- Cinematography: Pasquale Mari
- Music by: Dario Lucantoni
- Release date: 1998
- Country: Italy
- Language: Italian

The Ballad of the Windshield Washers (Italian: La ballata dei lavavetri) is a 1998 Italian drama film directed by Peter Del Monte. It is based on a novel by Edoardo Albinati. It was screened out of competition at the 59th Venice International Film Festival.

== Cast ==
- Olek Mincer: Zygmunt
- Kim Rossi Stuart: Rafal
- Agata Buzek: Justyna
- Andrzej Grabowski: Pawel
- Grażyna Wolszczak: Helena
- Elzhana Popova: Irina
- Victor Cavallo: Driver
- Maxime Kone: Ambulante

== See also ==
- Movies about immigration to Italy
