= Hôtel de Ville, Villeneuve-sur-Lot =

Town hall in Villeneuve-sur-Lot, France

Hôtel de Ville
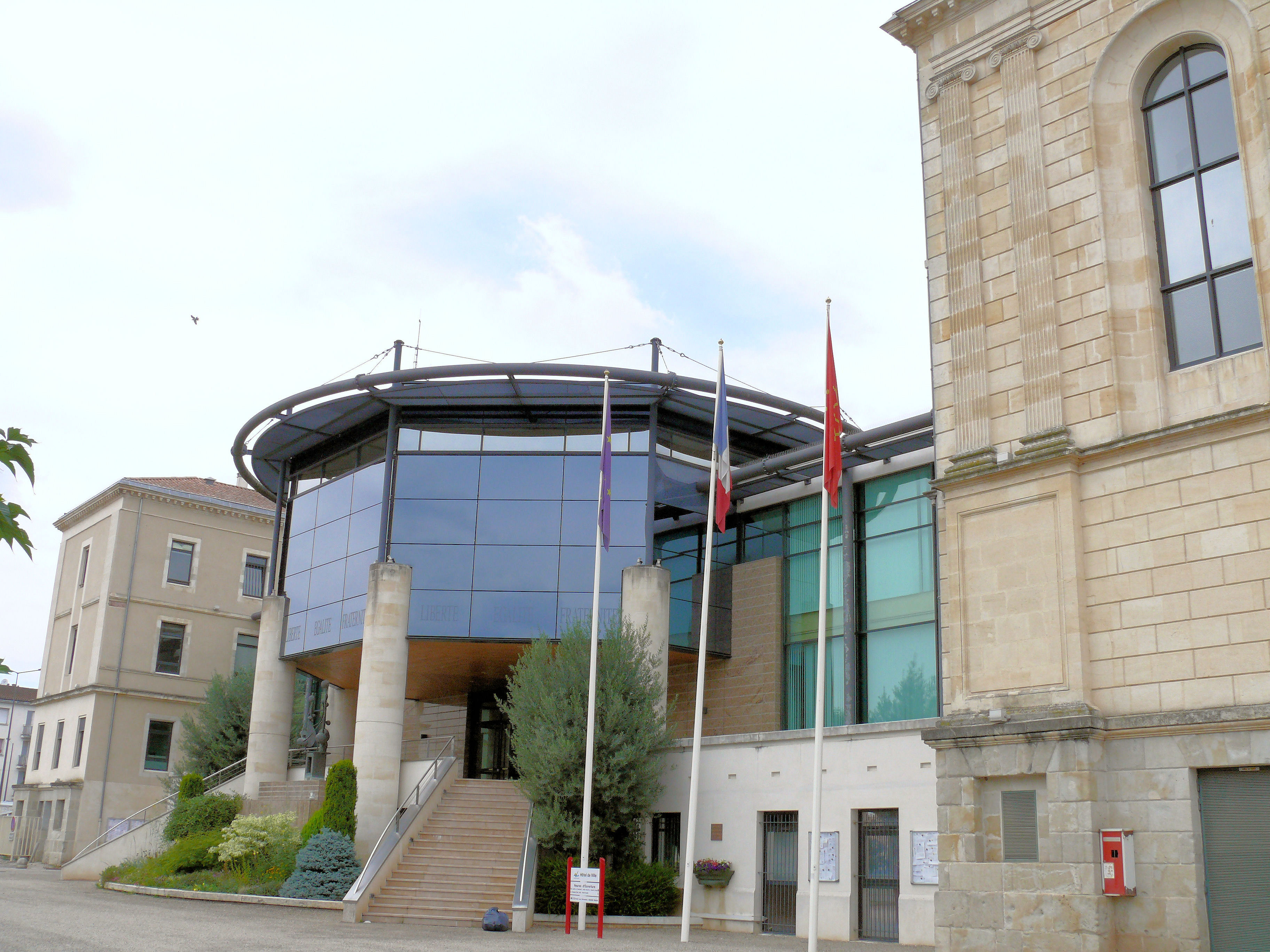
- The main frontage of the Hôtel de Ville in July 2011
- Interactive map of the Hôtel de Ville area

General information
- Type: City hall
- Architectural style: Neoclassical style
- Location: Villeneuve-sur-Lot, France
- Coordinates: 44.4103°N 0.7060°E
- Completed: 1847

The Hôtel de Ville (French pronunciation: [otɛl də vil], City Hall) is a municipal building in Villeneuve-sur-Lot, Lot-et-Garonne, in southwestern France, standing on Boulevard de la République. It has been included on the Inventaire général des monuments by the French Ministry of Culture since 1999.

== History ==
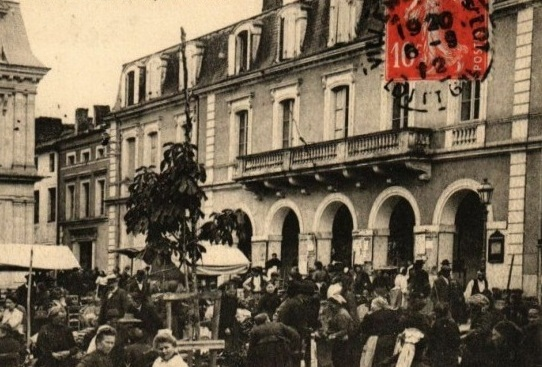
The old town hall

In the 19th century, the town council was accommodated in the former Couvent des Capucins (Convent of the Capucins) on the right bank of the River Lot. Founded in 1619, it was seized by the state during the French Revolution and then, after serving as the town hall, it was demolished in 1889.

In 1906, the council moved to the former Couvent de Notre-Dame (Convent of Notre-Dame) which was also on the right bank of the river. Founded by Charles, Comte de Fumel in 1642, it was also seized by the state during the French Revolution and then accommodated the gendarmerie before becoming the town hall. It was designed in the neoclassical style and built in ashlar stone. The design involved a main frontage of 11 bays facing onto what is now Place du 18 Juin 1940. The central section of five bays was arcaded on the ground floor and the building was fenestrated by segmental headed windows on the ground floor and by segmental-headed windows with cornices and balustrades on the first floor. After it was no longer required for municipal use, it was sold to a developer, "France Demeures", for conversion into luxury flats, in January 1999.

In 1998, following a significant increase in population, the council led by the mayor, Michel Gonelle, decided to acquire a more substantial building. The building they selected was the former Couvent des Religieuses de la Croix (Convent of the Sisters of the Holy Cross) on the north side of Boulevard de la République. The sisters, who had previously been accommodated at the Hôtel Bellecombe acquired the site in 1842. The new building was designed in the neoclassical style, built in ashlar stone and completed in 1847. It was formed by three blocks laid out around a courtyard. After the convent was dissolved in 1901, the building served as a girls' school and later as the Anatole-France school. After the school closed in 1967, it became a community centre.

A major programme of works was instigated in the late 1990s, to convert it into a municipal building. As part of these works a new octagonal structure was erected which was projected forward from the courtyard and accommodated the Salle du Conseil (council chamber). A monument to commemorate the life of the former prime minister of France, Georges Leygues, which had been installed on a site adjacent to the old town hall in 1953, was relocated to the garden in front of the new town hall in February 2021.
