= Ifi Ude =

Polish singer (born 1986)

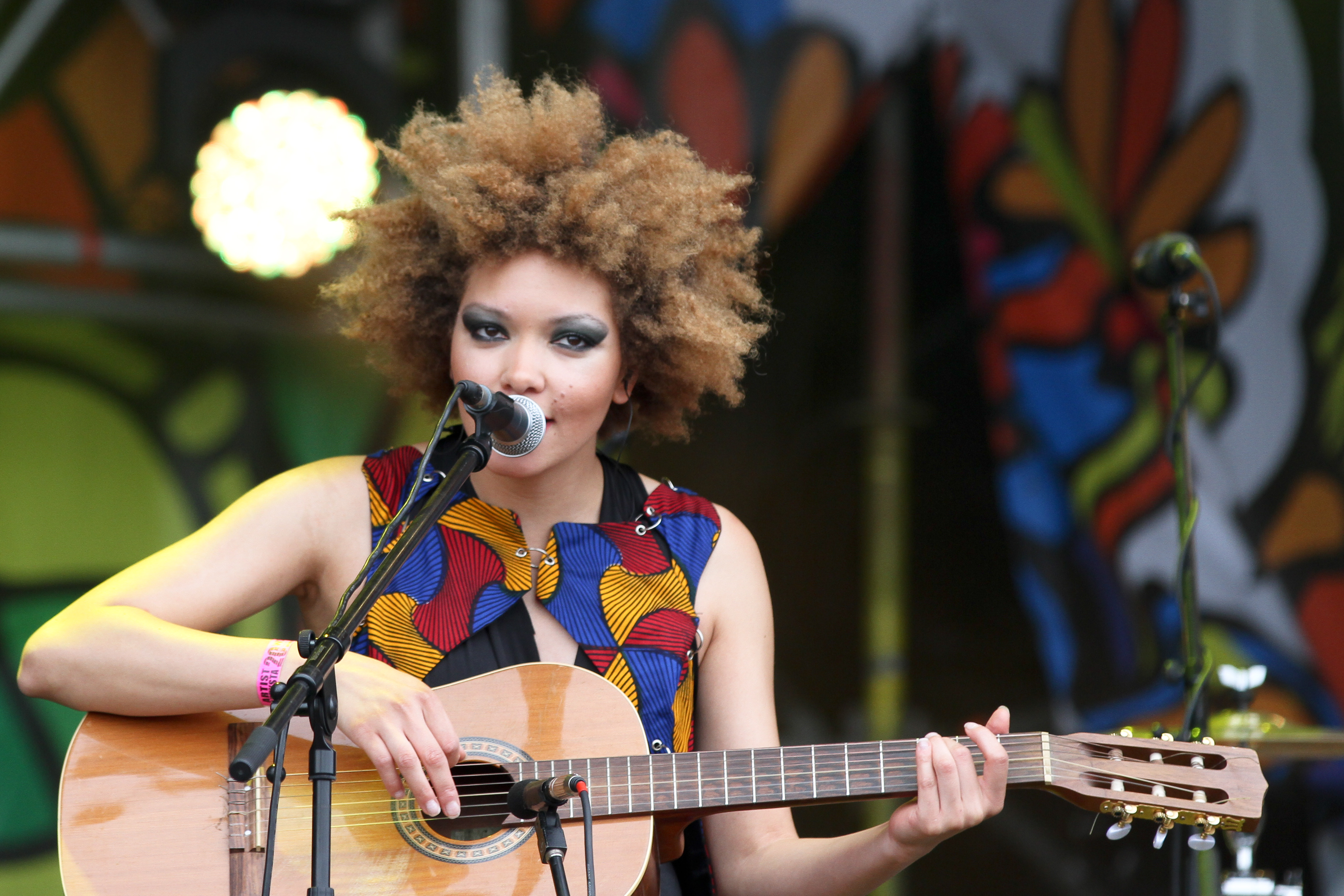
- Ifi Ude in 2014

Background information
- Born: Diana Ifeoma Ude; 15 February 1986 (age 40); Enugu, Nigeria
- Origin: Opole, Poland
- Genres: Pop
- Occupations: singer; songwriter; novelist
- Years active: 2005–present

Diana Ifeoma Ude (born 15 February 1986) is a Nigerian and Polish singer. She is the daughter of a Polish mother and a Nigerian father of the Igbo tribe. She came to Poland at the age of three, where she lived with her maternal grandmother in Opole. She has studied culture at the University of Warsaw.

She was one of the ten participants in the Polish national final for the Eurovision Song Contest 2018, performing the song "Love is Stronger". With 16 points, she came in the fourth place.

== Discography ==
=== Albums ===
- 2013: Ifi Ude

=== Singles ===
- 2013: "ArkTika"
- 2012: "My Baby Gone"
- 2017: "Love is Stronger"
