= Malka Moma =

Bulgarian folk song

"Malka moma" (Bulgarian: Малка мома, lit. 'A Young Girl') is a Bulgarian song written in folk style. The words were written by Neli Andreeva, who is originally from the Rodopi region of Bulgaria; and the music was written by Neli Andreeva and Georgi Genov.

== Lyrics ==
Lyrics of Malka Moma, transliterated and translated
Малка Мома (Bulgarian Cyrillic)	Malka Moma (Transliteration)	A Young Girl (English translation)
Малка мома си са Богу моли: —Дай ми, Боже, очи голубови, Дай ми, Боже, очи голубови; Дай ми, Боже, крилца соколови, Дай ми, Боже, крилца соколови; Да си форкнам отвъд бели Дунав, Да си форкнам отвъд бели Дунав, Да си найда момче според мене. Чу я Господ. Стори очи голубови И крилца соколови Та й даде крилца соколови Та си найде момче според нея, Та си найде момче според нея, Боже.	Malka moma si sa Bogu moli: —Dai mi, Bozhe, ochi golubovi, Dai mi, Bozhe, ochi golubovi; Dai mi, Bozhe, kriltsa sokolovi, Dai mi, Bozhe, kriltsa sokolovi, Da si forknam otvuhd beli Dunav, Da si forknam otvuhd beli Dunav, Da si naida momche spored mene. Chu ya Gospod. Stori ochi golubovi, I kriltsa sokolovi, Ta i dade kriltsa sokolovi Ta si naide momche spored neya, Ta si naide momche spored neya, Bozhe.	A young maiden prays to God: Give me, God, eyes of a dove, Give me, God, eyes of a dove; Give me, God, wings of a falcon, Give me, God, wings of a falcon. So I may fly beyond the white Danube, So I may fly beyond the white Danube, And find a boy for myself. The Lord heard her. Gave her eyes of a dove, And wings of a falcon, So, he gave her falcon's wings And she found a boy for herself, And she found a boy for herself, God.

== See also ==
Music of Bulgaria
