= Krushari Municipality =

Krushari Municipality Община Крушари
- Municipality
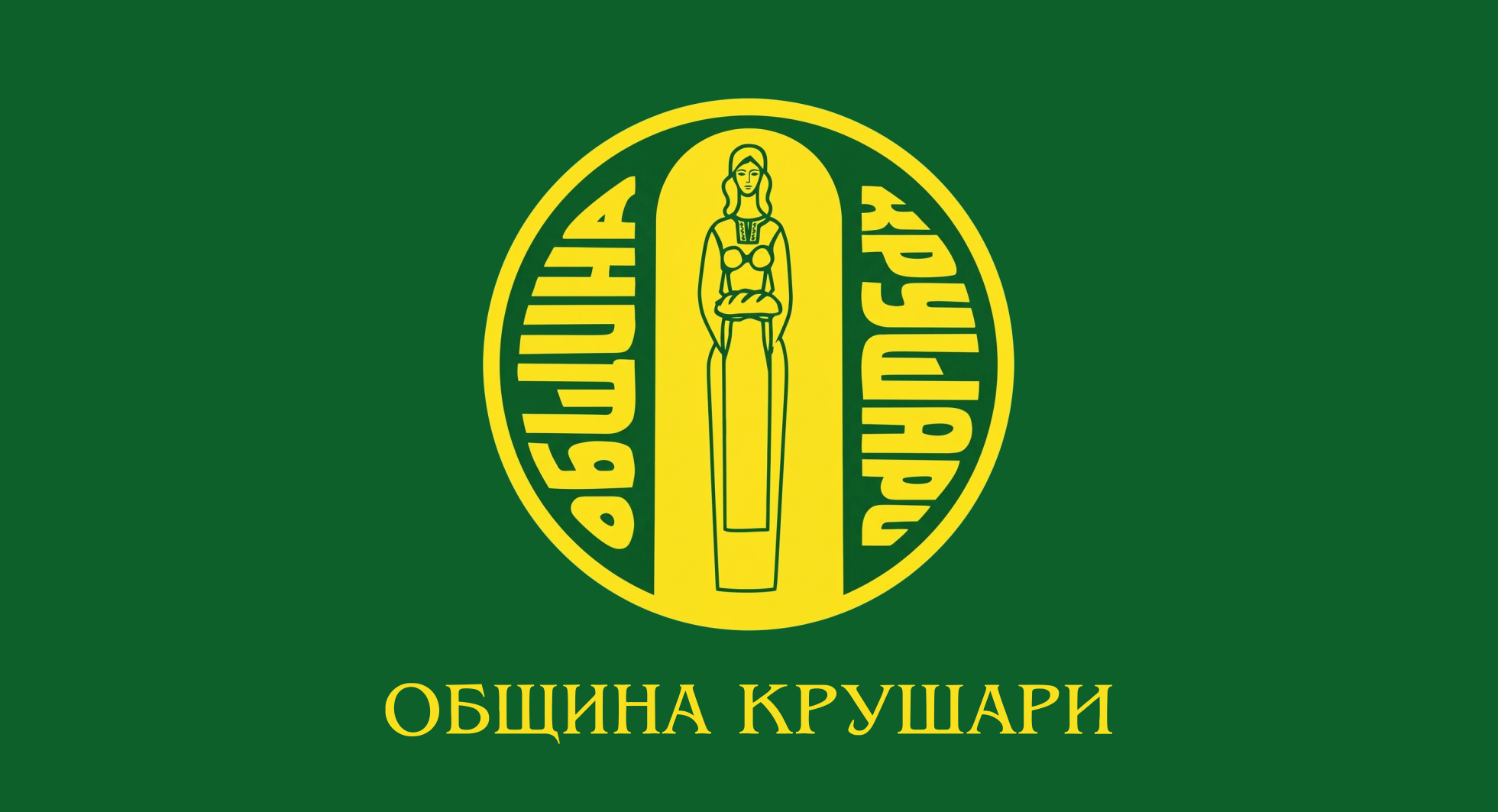
- Flag

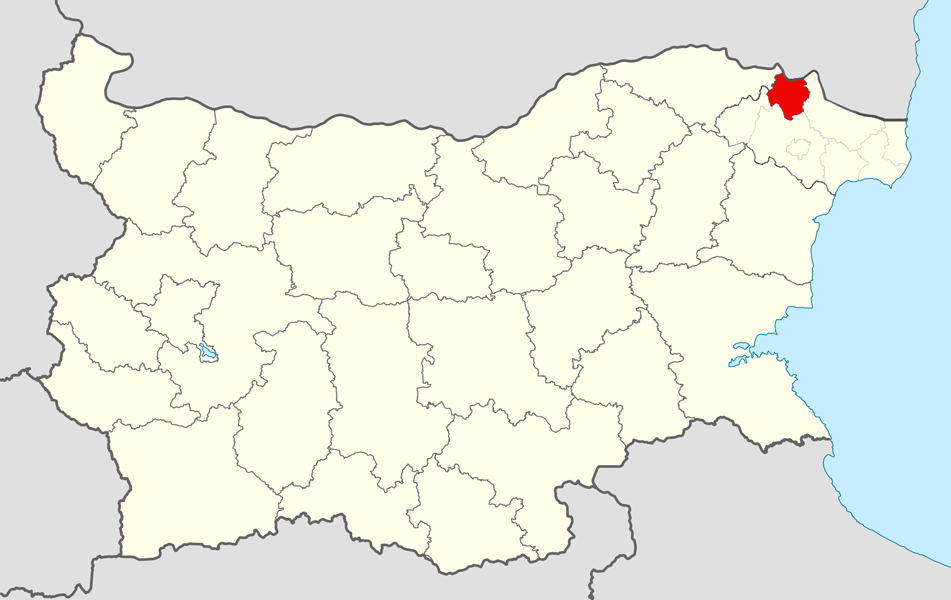
- Krushari Municipality within Bulgaria and Dobrich Province.
- Coordinates: 43°51′N 27°45′E
- Country: Bulgaria
- Province (Oblast): Dobrich
- Admin. centre (Obshtinski tsentar): Krushari

Area
  - Total: 417.5 km^{2} (161.2 sq mi)

Population (December 2009)
  - Total: 5,296
  - Density: 12.69/km^{2} (32.85/sq mi)
- Time zone: UTC+2 (EET)
  - Summer (DST): UTC+3 (EEST)

Krushari Municipality (Bulgarian: Община Крушари) is a municipality (obshtina) in Dobrich Province, Northeastern Bulgaria, located in Southern Dobruja geographical region, bounded by Romania to the north. It is named after its administrative centre - the village of Krushari.

The municipality embraces a territory of 417.5 km^{2} (161.2 sq mi) with a population of 5,296 inhabitants, as of December 2009.

== Settlements ==
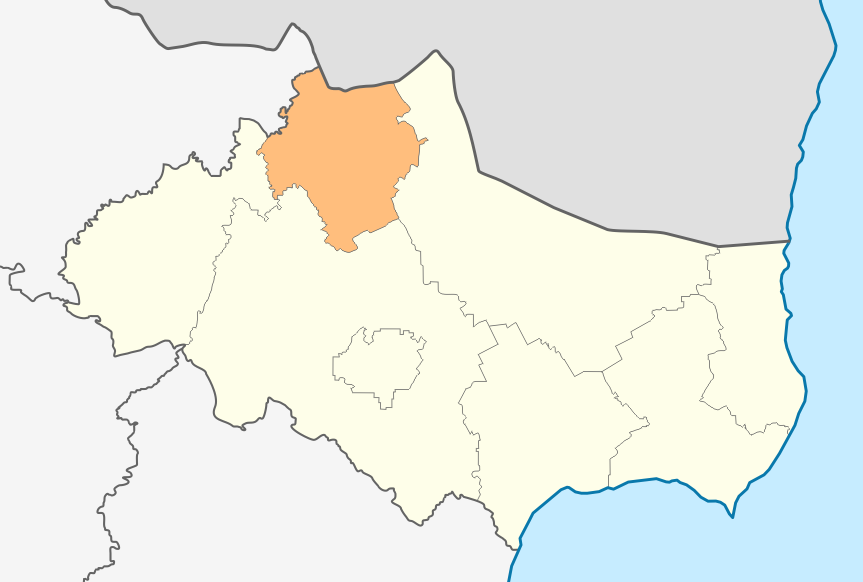
Krushari Municipality within Dobrich Province

Krushari Municipality includes the following 19 places, all of them are villages:

Town/Village	Cyrillic	Population (December 2009)
Krushari	Крушари	1592
Abrit	Абрит	285
Aleksandria	Александрия	147
Bistrets	Бистрец	112
Dobrin	Добрин	185
Efreytor Bakalovo	Ефрейтор Бакалово	292
Gaber	Габер	123
Kapitan Dimitrovo	Капитан Димитрово	134
Koriten	Коритен	326
Lozenets	Лозенец	607
Ognyanovo	Огняново	34
Polkovnik Dyakovo	Полковник Дяково	304
Poruchik Kurdjievo	Поручик Кърджиево	54
Severnyak	Северняк	178
Severtsi	Северци	203
Telerig	Телериг	514
Zagortsi	Загорци	156
Zementsi	Земенци	29
Zimnitsa	Зимница	21
Total		5,296

== Demography ==
The following table shows the change of the population during the last four decades.

Krushari Municipality
Year	1975	1985	1992	2001	2005	2007	2009	2011
Population	10,657	8,594	7,243	5,924	5,852	5,617	5,296	...
Sources: Census 2001, Census 2011, „pop-stat.mashke.org“,

=== Religion ===
According to the latest Bulgarian census of 2011, the religious composition, among those who answered the optional question on religious identification, was the following:

Religious composition of Krushari Municipality
Orthodox Christianity	43.3%
Catholicism	0.8%
Protestantism	0.0%
Islam	36.5%
No religion	5.7%
Prefer not to answer, others and indefinable	13.7%

== See also ==
- Provinces of Bulgaria
- Municipalities of Bulgaria
- List of cities and towns in Bulgaria
