= Dimitrovo =

Dimitrovo may refer to:

- Dimitrovo, Russia, name of several rural localities in Russia
- Dimitrovo, former name of Pernik, a city in Bulgaria
- Dimitrovo, after 1945, name of Ponarth, a suburb/quarter of Königsberg (Kaliningrad)
- Former name of Oleksandriiske, Ukraine

== See also ==
- Kapitan Dimitrovo, a village in Bulgaria
- Dimitrov (disambiguation)
