= Access to public information in North Macedonia =

Access to public information and freedom of information (FOI) refer to the right of access to information held by public bodies also known as "right to know". Access to public information is considered of fundamental importance for the effective functioning of democratic systems, as it enhances governments' and public officials' accountability, boosting people participation and allowing their informed participation into public life. The fundamental premise of the right of access to public information is that the information held by governmental institutions is in principle public and may be concealed only on the basis of legitimate reasons which should be detailed in the law.

Access to public information is guaranteed by the Constitution of North Macedonia (Article 16). To implement this constitutional right, the Parliament of the Republic of Macedonia in January 2006 adopted the Law on Free Access to Public Information defining the procedures for exercising this right. The Law has been significantly amended at the beginning of 2010. According to a research carried out by the Centre for Law and Democracy, Macedonia is in the high 14th place on the world ranking list of states having the most functional law on free access to public information, despite the fact that this right has been introduced into Macedonian legal system in a relatively recent period. However, according to the European Commission, the implementation of the Law on Free Access to Public Information remains ineffective.

== FOI provisions under the law ==
The Law on Free Access to Information stresses the obligation of the institutions to provide information with precise deadlines: it allows individuals and legal entities to exercise their right of access to public information and obliges the holders of information to provide information to the public.

The public authorities subject to the law are governmental institutions and other bodies and institutions set by law, municipal bodies, public institutions and services, public enterprises and natural persons and legal entities performing a public service. In general, all information available to the public authorities holding the information is public. Access to them may be refused in exceptional cases determined by law.

The holders of information are obliged to keep records and to update the list of information in their disposal and to publish them in a manner available to the public. Also, they are obliged to provide premises for inspection of the requested information.

All institutions subject to the law are required to appoint officials for handling access to information requests. They are the reference point for the citizens willing to exercise their right to access public information. The holder of the information is obliged to inform the public on the official person responsible for mediating information. The appointed person for mediating information shall provide the necessary information, help the applicant and keep special records for receipt of the applications for information.

Applicants can submit the requests in writing or orally. Reviewing the documents at the institution's building is free of charge. Costs of photocopying, transcribing, translating or delivering the documents can be charged to the applicant. A decision on the request should be made within 30 days. Access to information can be refused if it threatens national or public security; the economy; the environment; commercial or private legitimate interests; monetary and exchange policies; or if interferes with the prevention of criminal offences.

The Commission for Protection of the Right to Free Access to Public Information (KOMSPI) is in charge for providing information to the citizens regarding access to information, monitoring the implementation of the law and delivering regular annual reports on the application of the Law to the Parliament. Also, the Commission conducts seminars and trainings aiming at educating public officials in their duties to implement the access to public information law. According to the 2015 European Commission Progress Report 2015 the Commission does not have sufficient capacity to monitor compliance with proactive disclosure of information, and has not the power to impose sanctions to better enforce the legislation.

The applicant has the right to appeal against a refusal. The first complaint is to the Commission for Protection of the Right to Free Access to Public Information; in case the applicant is not satisfied with the decision, he/she can launch a judicial review.

== Access to public information in practice ==
Despite the good legal framework, the implementation of the Law on Free Access to Public Information remains ineffective. Penalties are not imposed for failure to comply. Political parties are excluded from the list of holders of information, thus they are outside the scope of the law.

According to journalists, there is a tendency by public authorities to over-use the "classification" of documents to prevent public access to information. According to Freedom House, the law is unevenly and selectively enforced, with official denying responses and shunning independent or critical media outlets.

To monitor and test the implementation of the law, in 2012 the Macedonian Young Lawyers Association (MYLA) submitted 145 requests for free access to information of public interest to a number of state institutions. More than two thirds of the information holders responded within the legal time limit and delivered the requested information. However, some problems of implementation and difficulties emerged, such as the practice of redirecting the requests towards other state institutions, instead of delivering it.

According to a survey conducted in 2013 by the Foundation Open Society - Macedonia, a significant share of Macedonian citizens does not believe they are entitled to have the right of access to public information and request informations of public interest. According to the survey, more than half of citizens had never heard and were unaware of the Law on Free Access to Public Information; only 13% of them were well knowledgeable about the Law.

== See also ==
- Access to public information in Europe
- Freedom of information
- Freedom of information laws by country
- Transparency of media ownership in Europe
- Media of the Republic of Macedonia
- Transparency of media ownership in the Republic of Macedonia
