= Mass media in North Macedonia =

The mass media in North Macedonia refers to mass media outlets based in North Macedonia. Television, magazines, and newspapers are all operated by both state-owned and for-profit corporations which depend on advertising, subscription, and other sales-related revenues. The Constitution of North Macedonia guarantees freedom of the press and of expression, yet they are not upheld impartially by the authorities. As a country in transition, North Macedonia's media system is under transformation.

== Legislative framework ==
The Constitution of North Macedonia guarantees the freedom of expression, freedom of speech, the right to access to information and the establishment of institutions for public information. It also guarantees the freedom of reception and transmission of information, and bans censorship. Finally, the Constitution guarantees to national minorities the right to cultural expression and information in their own languages.

The Law on Broadcasting Activity foresees restrictions to the broadcast of contents aimed at the violent overthrow of the constitutional order, military aggression, or incitement of national, racial, gender or religious hatred and intolerance, as well as programs liable to damage the physical, mental or development of children and youth.

Libel and defamation are decriminalised since 2012's Law on Civil Liability for Defamation and Insult, though fines remain extremely high.

A new law on the media is being drafted, to harmonise it with the EU AVMS directive. Yet, early drafts raised concerns in terms of possible restrictions to media freedoms.

The law on access to information, adopted in 2006, is harmonised with international and EU standards. The Commission for Free Access to Public Information is still not independent as it should and lacks capacities. The law remains not fully implemented, and access to public information is uneven and selectively enforced.

Radio and TV broadcasting during electoral campaign is regulated by the Election Code. Press coverage of election time is only self-regulated; an independent study in 2013 found large imbalances and lack of professional standards, so that "some media news was used to directly manipulate the opinion of the electorate".

The independent regulatory authority is the Broadcasting Council, whose tasks and powers are aligned with Council of Europe recommendations, but which remains strongly influenced by the political parties, the government, and the media industry. Although members of the Council are selected by "authorised nominators" (the Inter-University Conference, the Macedonian Academy of Arts and Sciences, the Association of Journalists, and the Parliamentary Committee on Elections and Nominations), the majority of appointees are deemed close to the ruling party, thus bringing partisanship in the regulatory body.

Online content is not specifically regulated, besides the general restrictions against hate speech, and intermediaries (ISP) are not liable for distributed contents.

=== Status and self-regulation of journalists ===
Journalists in North Macedonia face "low salaries, poor job security and working conditions, and editorial pressure from owners".

Most journalists in North Macedonia have rather low socio-economic status, and their labour and social rights are limited; many work without contracts or signing blank resignation in advance. The average wage in the sector is of €250 per month (national average: €350/m).

There is yet no self-regulatory body for journalists in the country. A Council of Ethics in Media was established in 2010 as tripartite body of journalists, editors, and media owners. The Independent Union of Journalists is a weak body, lacking resources and a strong membership base. Unionisation is often deemed unacceptable by media owners, leading journalists to pursue secret membership. In 2011 more than 20 union members, including its President, were fired. Pressure on journalists are various and widespread, from marginalisation of critical journalists to reallocation across the media.

The Code of Ethics of the Journalists of North Macedonia is set as the professional guideline; yet, violations of basic standards are widespread, e.g. in the use of judgemental labels, vague references, biased sources, and evaluatory framing. Journalism is still mainly seen as aimed at providing public exposure for political elites, particularly government members. Investigative and analytic journalism is almost absent.

Journalists are protected from being compelled to testify about confidential information or sources by both the Constitution (art. 16) and the 2005 Broadcasting Law.

Bloggers and citizen journalists are not recognised or protected by the legislation of North Macedonia.

== Media outlets ==
Commercial media are mainly funded through advertising revenues, coupled with state budget funds for "public campaigns". The government has grown to among the five top advertisers in the country, affecting market competition and editorial independence. Moreover, the ruling party benefits from big discounts on airtime prices from friendly media during electoral periods. The large use of advertisement funding by the ruling party is deemed to increase the media's financial dependence and foster pro-governmental alignment. Public campaigns are aired for free on MRTV.

Pro-governmental media are deemed to hold a dominant position in the market. Telma TV, Sloboden Pecat, 24 Vesti and Fokus are deemed as having a balanced or critical coverage.

The market features a high number of media, with a shrinking advertising revenue, and a fragmentation due to technological development and digitalisation. Most advertising revenue goes to the television industry, particularly the national terrestrial channels. Media ownership is often opaque due to the use of proxies. Foreign investments in the Macedonian media are limited to Serbian companies – one of which is a monopolist in newspapers' printing and distribution, with ties to high-level security officials.

=== News agencies ===
The public news agency is the Media Information Agency (MIA), established in 1992 and working in Macedonian, English and Albanian. Private news agencies include the Macedonian Information Centre (MIC, est. 1992), Makfax (1993), and online-based Net Press (2007).

=== Print media ===
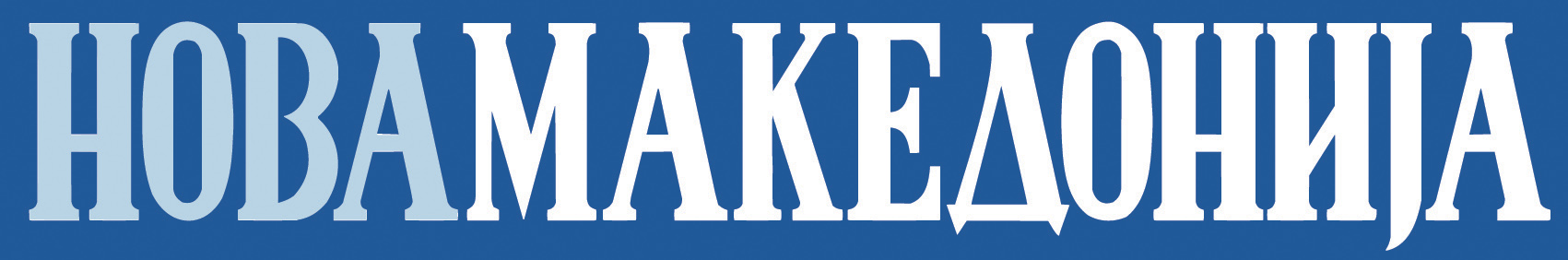
Nova Makedonija

The oldest newspaper in the country is Nova Makedonija, founded in 1944. Its first edition is from 29 October 1944. The unsuccessful privatisation of Nova Makedonija in 1994-96 led to the disappearance of all its print outlets from the market, and the later entry of WAZ as the main foreign investor, with a resulting strong concentration in the print media sector (90% in 2003). WAZ withdrew in 2012, selling its publications to local investors.

Other well known daily newspaper are Utrinski Vesnik (est. 1999), Dnevnik (1996),Večer (1963), Vest, Makedonski Sport , FAKTI (1998 in Albanian) and Koha (in Albanian). Weeklies include Republika, financial Kapital, Fokus, women's Tea Moderna and Makedonsko Sonce (est. 1994).

Hidden ownership of the print media remains a concern, and hinders media pluralism and independence, since actual owners are deemed to be affiliated to political interests.

=== Publishing ===
NIP Nova Makedonija

=== Radio broadcasting ===
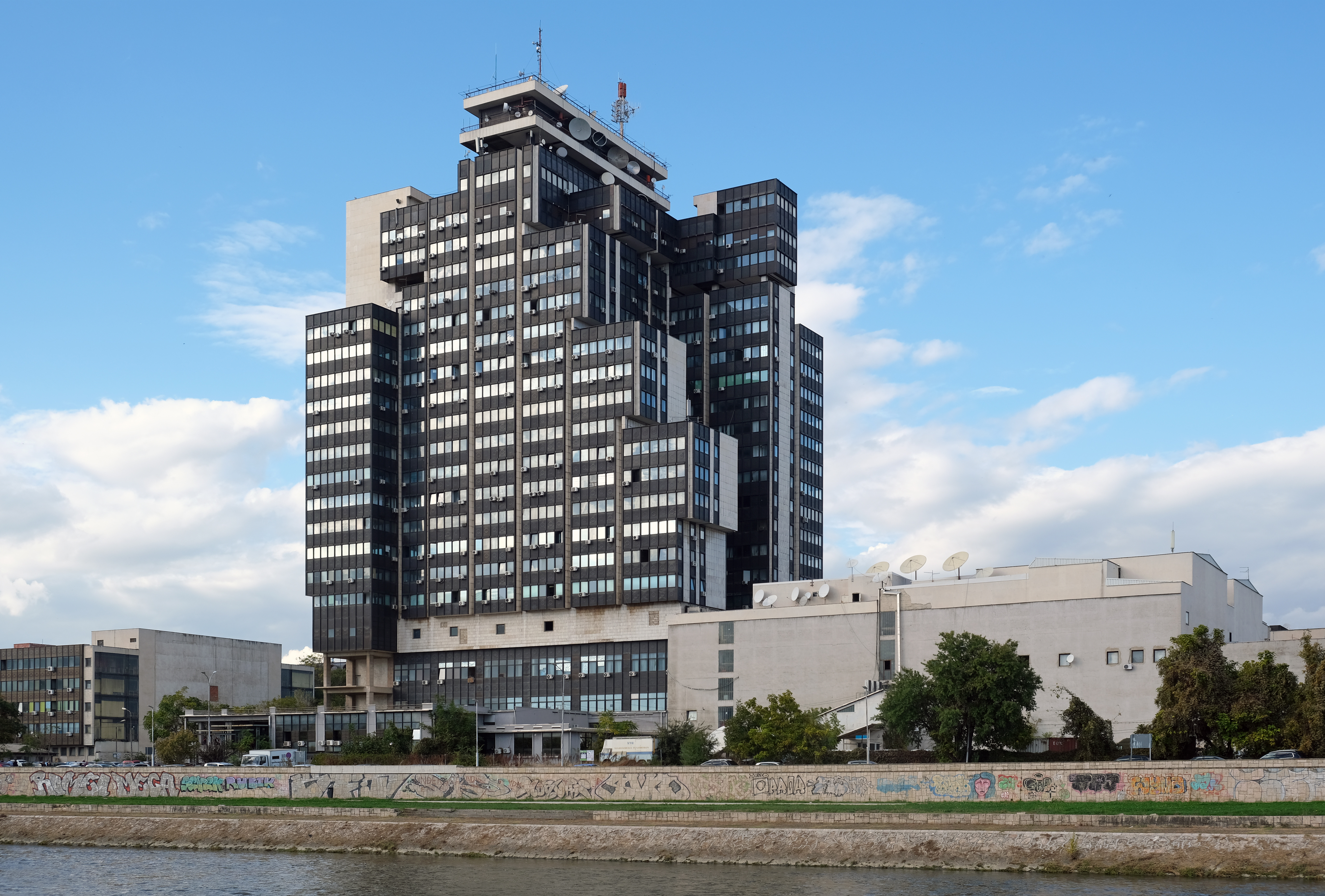
Macedonian Radio Television building in Skopje

The public radio broadcaster Macedonian Radio Television operates over multiple stations, including three national channels, a satellite channel and a non-profit regional channel. It broadcasts 86.5 hours of programmes daily on its national and satellite channels. The First channel, Radio Skopje, broadcasts a continuous 24-hour programme and mainly functions as a talk radio. The Second channel, Radio 2, broadcasts a continuous 24-hour programme, focused on popular music and entertainment. The Third channel broadcasts programmes in all the languages of the national minorities in North Macedonia, including Albanian (since 1948); Turkish (since 1945) 5 hours; Vlach (since 1991); Romany (since 1991); Serbian (since 2003) and Bosnian (since 2003) all 30 minutes each per day. The satellite channel, Radio Macedonia, commenced in July 2003, and broadcasts a 24-hour continual programme, which is a selection of programmes from Macedonian Radio and its original programme "Radio Macedonia" with a duration of 6 hours and 30 minutes. Kanal 103 provides FM broadcasting only for the region of Skopje with the mission of promoting avantgarde music and culture. Macedonian Radio also broadcasts its programme over the Internet.

Three privately owned radio stations broadcast nationally in North Macedonia. They are Antenna 5 FM (founded in 1994 as a contemporary hits radio station and soon part of the MTV Radio Network), Kanal 77 (based in Štip), and Metropolis radio. There are about 70 local commercial radio stations (2012), including Radio Bravo, City FM 97.9 and Alfa Radio. There used to be counted up to 410,000 Radio receivers in use in 2008.

=== Television broadcasting ===
Television was first introduced in 1964 in Yugoslav Macedonia; it remains the most popular news medium. The public broadcaster is the Macedonian Radio Television (MKRTV), founded in 1993. TEKO TV (1989) from Štip is the first private television channel in the country. Other popular private channels are: Sitel, Kanal 5, Telma, Alfa TV, and Alsat-M. Most private media are tied to political or business interests and state media tend to support the government. Public broadcast networks face stiff competition from commercial stations, which dominate the ratings. A European Union sponsored report says that with scores of TV and radio networks, the market is overcrowded and many local broadcasters are struggling to survive financially.

The process of transformation of MRTV in a public service broadcaster is not yet completed; it entailed the 1997 Law on Broadcasting Activities and the 2005 Broadcast Law. Editorial independence of MRTV is guaranteed by law but de facto lacking due to lack of independent funding and lack of independence of MRTV managerial bodies. MRTV executive directors in the last ten years remained close to the party in power. The network is funded by a license fee as well as by public budget contributions and advertising revenues (limited to 10% of airtime). Budgetary needs, and the practice of ad hoc state budgetary funding, has created a "culture of dependence" in MRTV.

MRTV is supervised by the MRTV Council, whose members are appointed by the Parliament upon proposal by "authorised nominators" from civil society. The Council then elects the members of MRTV Management Board. Although formally only accountable to the legislature through its annual report and budget plan, MRTV remains informally accountable to the executive, undermining institutional autonomy. MRTV also risks neglecting cultural pluralism obligations, in terms of programmes for minorities, as well as lacking impartiality and distance from government/majority politicians.

DVB-T was introduced in Macedonia in November 2009 as a pay TV platform known as BoomTV by ONE. The platform includes local channels with national frequency and the most popular world channels. Boom TV is using 3 multiplexes (MUX 1, MUX 2 and MUX 3). The DVB-T switch off in the country was completed on 1 June 2013. MRD (North Macedonia Broadcasting Council) operates and maintains the DVB-T network in North Macedonia and the public Macedonian Radio Television using MUX 4 and MUX 5 while ONE operates the private national and local TV stations using MUX 6 and MUX 7.

Cable television is highly developed, with cable television penetration in Skopje at 67% of all households. There are 49 cable TV providers with the two majors Blizoo and Telekabel holding 80% of the market. The two majors offer cable television in both analogue and digital, and they have also introduced triple play at the beginning of 2007. On 17 November 2008, IPTV was first officially launched started in the country when the country's first IPTV service, MaxTV, was launched by Makedonski Telekom.

- Television stations:
  - the public TV broadcaster operates 3 national channels and a satellite network; 5 privately owned TV channels broadcast nationally using terrestrial transmitters and about 15 broadcast nationally via satellite; there are roughly 75 local commercial TV stations; and a large number of cable operators offering domestic and international programming (2012);
  - 136 stations (1997).
- Television sets: 1.9 million sets in use (2008).

=== Cinema ===
The history of film making in the republic dates back over 110 years. The first film to be produced on the territory of the present-day the country was made in 1895 by Janaki and Milton Manaki in Bitola. Throughout the past century, the medium of film has depicted the history, culture and everyday life of the Macedonian people. Over the years many Macedonian films have been presented at film festivals around the world and several of these films have won prestigious awards. The first Macedonian feature film was Frosina, released in 1952. The first feature film in colour was Miss Stone, a movie about a Protestant missionary in Ottoman Macedonia. It was released in 1958. The highest grossing feature film in the country was Bal-Can-Can, having been seen by over 500,000 people in its first year alone.

In 1994 Milco Manchevski's film Before the Rain was nominated as Best Foreign Film. Manchevski continues to be the most prominent modern filmmaker in the country having subsequently written and directed Dust and Shadows.

=== Telecommunications ===
- Calling code: +389
- International call prefix: 00
- Main lines:
  - 407,900 lines in use, 103rd in the world (2012);
  - 550,000 lines in use (2005).
- Mobile cellular:
  - 2.2 million lines, 142nd in the world;
  - 2.1 million lines (2008).

The combined fixed-line and mobile-cellular telephone subscribership was about 130 per 100 persons in 2012. Competition from mobile-cellular phones has led to a drop in fixed-line telephone subscriptions.

=== Internet ===
Around 68% of the population had access to internet in 2015. Legislation was aligned with EU standards with the February 2014 Law on Electronic Communications, to improve competition and consumers' rights.

- Top-level domains: .mk and .мкд (Cyrillic).
- Internet users:
  - 1.3 million users, 109th in the world; 63.1% of the population, 58th in the world (2012);
  - 1.1 million users, 97th in the world, 52% of the population (2009).
- Fixed broadband: 304,547 subscriptions, 79th in the world; 14.6% of the population, 58th in the world (2012).
- Wireless broadband: 449,646 subscriptions, 93rd in the world; 21.6% of the population, 68th in the world (2012).
- Internet hosts: 62,826 hosts, 92nd in the world (2012).
- IPv4: 657,664 addresses allocated, less than 0.05% of the world total, 315.8 addresses per 1000 people (2012).
- Internet service providers: 20 ISPs (2005).
- Wi-Fi coverage: 95% of the population (2006).

The United States Agency for International Development sponsored a project called "Macedonia Connects" which in 2006 helped to make North Macedonia the first all-broadband wireless country in the world, where Internet access is available to virtually anyone with a wireless-enabled computer. Wireless access is available to about 95 percent of Macedonians, even those living in remote sheepherding mountain villages where people don't have phones. The Ministry of Education and Sciences reported that all 461 primary and secondary schools were connected to the Internet. An Internet Service Provider (On.net), created a MESH Network to provide WIFI services in the 11 largest cities/towns in the country.

==== Internet censorship and surveillance ====
There are no government restrictions on access to the Internet or credible reports that the government monitors e-mail or Internet chat rooms without judicial oversight. Individuals and groups engage in the peaceful expression of views via the Internet, including by e-mail.

The constitution provides for freedom of speech and press; however, the government does not always respect these rights in practice. The law prohibits speech that incites national, religious, or ethnic hatred, and provides penalties for violations. In November 2012 the defamation, libel and slander laws were decriminalized. Editors and media owners expressed concerns that steep fines under the revised law would cause self-censorship. The law prohibits arbitrary interference with privacy, family, home, or correspondence, and the government generally respects these prohibitions in practice.

== Media organisations ==
=== Trade unions ===
The government has taken a biased approach to media unions. It has promoted the Macedonian Association of Journalists (MAN) while putting pressure on the traditional Journalists' Association of Macedonia (ZNM) and Trade Union of Macedonian Journalists and Media Workers (SSNM).

In July 2014, an amendment to the Law on Audiovisual Services forced ZNM to give up one of its two seats in the board of the public service broadcaster to MAN.

=== Regulatory authorities ===
A new government-dominated media regulator was set up by the December 2013 Law on Media and Law on Audiovisual Media Services, replacing the previous Broadcasting Council. The agency is now empowered to impose harsh fines and revoke licenses if it detects contents that harm vaguely defined "public order" and "health or morals". Amelioratory amendments were passed in January 2014, exempting online media and minimizing obligations for print media, but the overall framework remains deemed inadequate.

== Media freedom ==
=== Transparency of media ownership ===
For a long time specific provisions on media ownership transparency in North Macedonia have only concerned the broadcast sector (television and radio), while the other sectors, i.e. print and online media, were only included in the scope of the general corporate law which is applicable to all registered companies. Only in December 2013 a new Media Law was adopted to cover also transparency requirements for the print sector which was assimilated to the broadcast sector in terms of transparency obligations.

As for the broadcast media, the public in North Macedonia is able to identify who actually owns this kind of media outlets thanks to the ownership reporting obligations set forth in the Law on Broadcasting Activity. Under this law, all the essential ownership information, including beneficial ownership and source of funding, must be disclosed to the regulator, namely the Broadcasting Council and made public via its website. Specifically, under Art. 20 of this law, broadcasters are obliged to publish their ownership data three times a year. The Broadcast Council is also tasked to oversee and enforce these obligations.

Despite the existing legislative requirements, the implementation of the rules on media ownership transparency has been a persistent problem in North Macedonia so that at times even authorities claimed not to be aware of informal ownership structures in the country. In other cases, authorities have stated to be aware of opaque interests in media ownership structures, but they have not taken any action because the information provided on the ownership regime were formally correct and indicated no breach of the rules. There are cases that are “public secrets” in North Macedonia, such as that of the covert cross-ownership between A1 TV and the daily newspapers Vreme, Spic and Koha e re, but the regulatory authorities do not take action and an investigation into it has never been initiated.

As for print media, their obligations in terms of media ownership transparency are covered by the new Media Law entered into force in 2013. The law requires for print media outlets the same disclosures rules applicable to the broadcast sector. Some of the print media used to publish their ownership data, such as the details on the legal entity owning the newspaper or information on the company providing printing and distribution, even before the adoption of the new law. However, with the new Media Law, the action of the audiovisual regulator has been broadened to the print media outlets as well and to undertake measures against the print media which do not comply with media transparency rules.

The online media sector in the least transparent in terms ownership transparency. This sector is not covered by media-specific provisions and is therefore regulated only through corporate laws, in particular the Law on Trade Activity. The electronic media outlets are not obliged to disclose data on their ownership structure, thus almost no online news make public its ownership structure. Also, the Law on Trade Activity permits secret ownership or ownership by proxy and does not require this information to be made public via the Trade Register. The lack of transparency of media ownership has created additional problem in the sector of online media, and especially for the biggest news site which do not declare who are their owners. The issue has gained momentum with the growth of digital sector to which outdated legislation cannot be applied to. To address the issue of lack of media ownership transparency in the field of online media outlets, a group of Macedonian journalists started a project called MediaPedia aiming at investigating, clarify and make public the ownership structures behind Macedonian web portals and to create a public database containing such information. The journalists working to the project found out several cases of offshore companies, non-existing companies and a wide network of actors committed to hide the real owners of Macedonian web informative portals. For instance, MediaPedia's team investigated the ownership structure of one of the biggest pro-governmental media in North Macedonia, i.e. the web portal Kurir.mk whose stories are widely disseminated through the main TV stations in Macedonia, especially those close to the government. According to MediaPedia's investigation there were two companies behind Kurir.mk website, namely Em Media Dooel and Iia Doo, that are part of a network of linked portals quoting each other and following a pro-governmental editorial policy. Also, the group discovered that the director of Em Media was the brother of Vlado Misajilovski, state secretary of the Ministry for foreign affairs of the ruling party VMRO-DPMNE. In addition, from the investigation in the financial flows resulted that these two companies received funds directly from the government, as well as from other public institutions, such as the Municipality of Skopje, the Ministry of culture, etc. Another case concerned the web portal Netpress.mk whose registration address matched with that of a company which helped other companies to open off shore affiliates. Moreover, the name of first director of the company owing the portal Netpress.mk was linked to another Macedonian company, namely NVSP which was in turn owner of the pro-governmental radio Radio Free Macedonia, and also among the owner of SGS, a security agency connected with the secret police.

=== Concentration of media ownership ===
In North Macedonia, the problem of media concentration and its influence over the content and pluralism of the media scene were not a major issue during the first years of the new media system. In that period the main focus was on the creation and consolidation of the pluralistic media space, which was conceived as an antipode to the previous media system, dominated by the Makedonska Radiotelevizija (state broadcaster) and the state-run newspaper publishing company Nova Makedonija. The new democratic political environment established in 1991 was not complemented with new legislation in the field of media, thus the creation of the new media environment occurred in the absence of a legislative framework. Broadcast media, in particular radio stations, proliferated spontaneously across the country. These media outlets were formally legalized in 1997 with the adoption on the Law on Broadcasting Activity.

Overall, the process of media democratisation and liberalisation occurred during the 1990s resulted in a situation characterised by some distinctive features: the fragmentation of the media market with a great number of media, affiliation of the most influential media with powerful local businesses and political parties.

Media ownership is regulated by national laws in line with international standards and with clear limitations in terms of shares of ownership that a person can hold in different media outlets. Ownership of broadcast media is strictly regulated. The law aims at preventing unwanted media concentration and prohibits public officials from holding shares of ownership in media outlets. A broadcast regulatory body keeps an official registry which lists the names of the nominal owners. However, this is not able to preventing hidden ownership through proxies and the real owners of many broadcasting media are unknown by the public. One the main problem affecting the Macedonian media system in terms of ownership is that companies and business people having a very diverse portfolios own most of the influential national television networks and cable television stations, but broadcast is not their main activity. Indeed, owners use their broadcast media primarily to support their other business activities and often influence the editorial policies in accordance with their business interests. Also, especially for traditional media which are nominally transparent, in many cases nominal owners only act as proxies for de facto owners that are often high-ranking officials of political parties.

Ownership of online media is totally unregulated. Some pro-government web portals are established in tax havens countries throughout the world. The investigative project Mediapedia has tried to disclose the ownership structures of several pro-government websites connected to bank accounts in Belize belonging to people having strong ties with the ruling party.

Concentration of ownership is strong in the print media sector: out of six Macedonian-language daily newspapers, a single publishing company owns three.

A 2011 international media freedom mission to North Macedonia carried out by the International Partnership Group of freedom of expression organisations, found out that many media outlets were owned by persons affiliated with political parties and that in two cases family members of those owners occupied managerial positions in the media outlets. Also, the Mission warned that there were clear examples of conflict of interest.

=== Censorship, soft censorship and self-censorship ===
In North Macedonia, public financial incentive have led to the "capture" of the media by the state, resulting in a reduction of the media's professionalism and credibility and its role in fostering democratic development. According to the World Association of Newspapers and News Publishers (WAN IFRA), one of the major challenges to independent and quality journalism is the symbiotic relationship between the ruling party and many media outlets and their owners. This is true at both national and local levels. Government-friendly media outlets are favoured through different means, including, for instance, non-transparent allocation of advertising and other funds. This generates an environment where political and business interests can influence media agendas.

According to a 2015 WAN IFRA report, a variety of soft censorship mechanisms are used to silence or pressure journalists in North Macedonia. Soft censorship, or indirect censorship, is defined as “an array of official actions intended to influence media output, short of legal or extra-legal bans, direct censorship of specific content, or physical attacks on media outlets or media practitioners.” Soft censorship is made possible by the opaqueness and poor regulation of the mechanisms for the allocation of state advertising, self-censorship, repressive legislation, lack of transparency of media ownership and of ownership connected to political parties.

Moreover, the financial environment and the market concerning the media system force many media outlets to depend on state advertising to remain financially viable. In such an environment media market which are critical of government policies are denied access to state advertising and support.

Soft censorship provides politicians and high-ranking officials simple tools to pressure journalists in often subtle ways. This has consequences both on content and the way media report. For instance, this results in the lack of unbiased reporting on government's and state institutions' activities, corruption, issues concerning the ties between politics, business and media.

Soft-censorship is also exerted through ownership structures. In North Macedonia, there are several connections between politicians and media owners; this is particularly visible in the work of the state-owned public broadcaster which is strongly influenced by the ruling party. Other problematic aspects affecting the quality of journalism in North Macedonia and the conditions of journalists and media professionales are the low wages and a chaotic labour market for media practitioners. Many journalists can barely survive with their monthly salaries; some media outlets operate in the black economy, often journalists are only partially regularly paid, meaning that have taxes and social security paid and recorded.

Macedonian journalists also face verbal threats and physical assaults which have increased since 2015 along with political and inter-ethnic violence. There are unsolved cases of physical attacks which are highly problematic for media freedom since such intimidations have a chilling effect on freedom of expression and cause self-censorship and soft censorship.

In addition, many journalists have to face criminal or civil cases filed against them. Others have been accused by media outlets connected with governmental structures to have behaved as intelligence services informants. In the course of 2015 the unauthorized surveillance of journalists by the secret police has caused both political crisis and media controversy in the country, contributing to a growing atmosphere of caution and self-censorship among Macedonian journalists.

=== Political interferences ===
The dominance of the government over the media landscape through the channel of advertisement was evident in the 2014 Macedonian general election, when most private and public media expressed a pro-governmental bias.

- In February 2014, the chief editor of Sitel TV called upon voters to support the government on ethnic nationalist grounds.

Criminal laws have been reported as being used by the authorities to restrict press freedom.

- In May 2013, Nova Makedonija's journalist Tomislav Kezarovski was arrested and charged with revealing the identity of a protected witness. In October 2013, he was sentenced to 4.5 years prison. Kezarovski had written in Reporter 92 magazine on how the police had pushed the witness to give false testimony. The witness confirmed it in court and said it was only given protection in 2010, two years after Kezarovski's reports. Kezarovski was moved under house arrest, pending his appeal.

The journalist argued for a public interest defence clause, since the police had presented a false protected witness against him. International protests had followed the sentence against him.

=== Civil defamation lawsuits ===
Although decriminalised, defamation is published by large fines in North Macedonia. Dozens of civil defamation cases had been issued against journalists in 2012/14, although many of them are settled out of court.

- In September 2014, the weekly Fokus had an adverse ruling confirmed in appeal. The media was condemned to pay 12,000 US$ and legal expenses for a 2013 article deemed defamatory against the then secret service chief Saso Mijalkov.
