= Alternative Social-Liberal Party =

Alternative Social-Liberal Party (Bulgarian: Алтернативна социаллиберална партия), was founded on February 11, 1990, as the Alternative Socialist Party (Алтернативна социалистическа партия). The party was formed previously by a minority fraction of the Bulgarian Communist Party.

The party was registered on March 7, 1990, with first president Nikolay Vasilev. The party participated independently in the 1990 parliamentary elections, and got 0.36% of the votes.

The second congress of the party, held on June 1, 1991, decided to change the name of the party to the current denomination. The new name was registered on August 28.

From 1990 to 1992 the party was a member of the Union of Democratic Forces. In the October 1991 parliamentary elections, the party won six seats on the lists of UDF.

In 1994 it was one of the four parties that founded the Democratic Alternative for the Republic.

In 2001 the president of the party, Vasil Velinov, launched a new party, the Alliance for Social-Liberal Progress. The remainder of ASP is now led by Alexander Dimitrov and Raicho Radev.

In the 2001 elections ASP got 4267 votes (0.09%).
