= Večer =

Večer means "Evening" or "The Evening" in several Slavic languages. It may refer to:

- Večer (North Macedonia) (Macedonian: Вечер), a Macedonian daily newspaper based in Skopje
- Večer (Slovenia), a Slovenian daily newspaper based in Maribor
