= Lozenets =

Lozenets (Bulgarian: Лозенец; also Lozenec or Lozenetz) may refer to:

- Lozenets, Burgas Province, a village in Bulgaria
- Lozenets, Dobrich Province, a village in Bulgaria
- Lozenets, Yambol Province, a village in Bulgaria
- Lozenets, Sofia, a municipality of Sofia, Bulgaria
