= Zagortsi =

Zagortsi may refer to:

- Zagortsi, Burgas Province
- Zagortsi, Dobrich Province
