= Dimitroff =

Dimitroff may refer to

- Tom Dimitroff, Sr. -- Gridiron football player and coach
- Thomas Dimitroff -- Gridiron football scout and general manager of the Atlanta Falcons
- Dimitrov (surname)
