= A1 Bulgaria =

Bulgarian telecommunications company

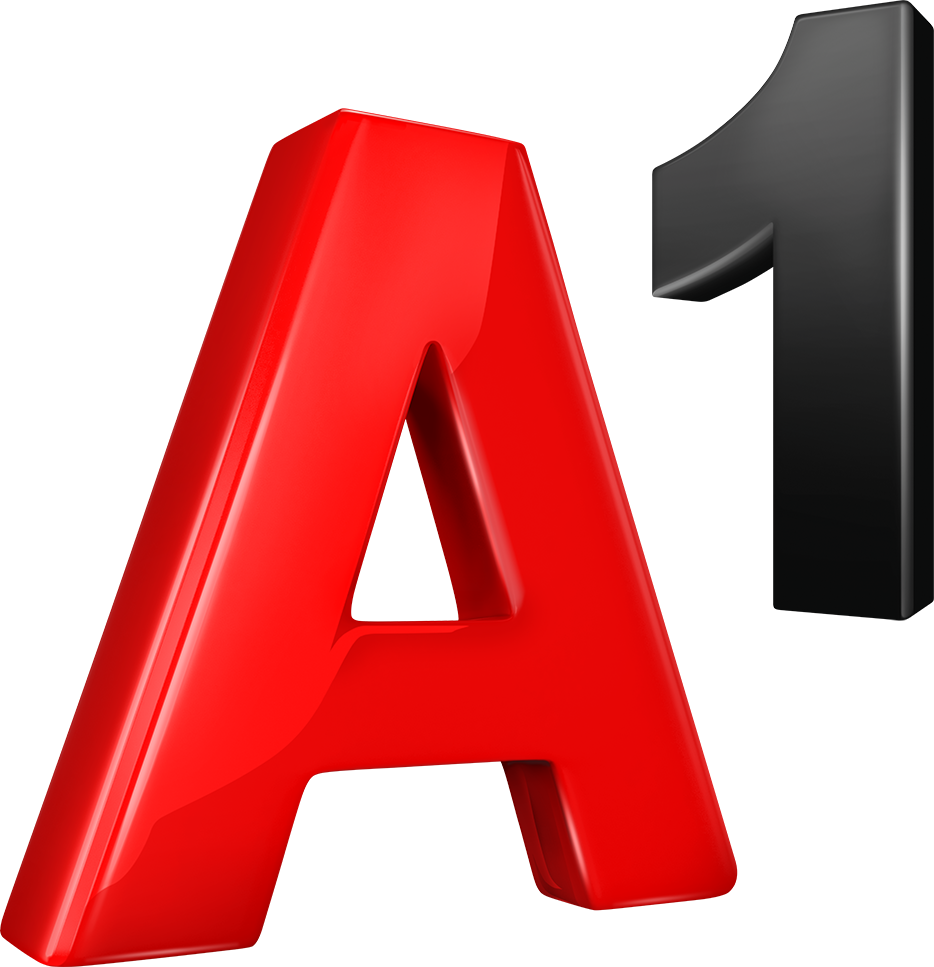
- Native name: А1 България
- Formerly: Mtel, Mobiltel
- Type: Subsidiary
- Industry: Telecommunications
- Founded: 1994; 32 years ago
- Headquarters: Sofia, Bulgaria
- Key people: Alexander Dimitrov, CEO
- Services: Fixed-line telephones; Mobile telephones; Cable television; Satellite television; IPTV
- Revenue: ▲€574.1 million (2021)
- Operating income: ▲€104.1 million (2021)
- Number of employees: 3,291 (2021)
- Parent: A1 Telekom Austria Group
- Website: www.a1.bg

A1 Bulgaria (previously known as Mtel or Mobiltel) is a telecommunications company in Bulgaria owned by A1 Telekom Austria Group.

== History ==
A1 Bulgaria was founded in March 1994 but was not launched commercially until September 1995 (as Citron).

In 2001, M-Tel (the brand then) launched its prepayment sim cards, which allowed customers to purchase credits prior to calling friends. This proved to be a great success and saw the number of customers using their network increase dramatically.

The company had a market share of about 58% and 3,000,000 clients in September 2004. On 14 September 2006 M-Tel reached 4,000,000 clients. As of May 2006 the company has 4,400,000 subscribers and its market share fell to 51.1%. Its contract customers increased to 1.7 mln, while the profit per customer dropped to 9.9 euros for Q1 2007.

The operator has been owned by Telekom Austria Group since July 2005, when it was acquired for up to €1.6 billion in one of Central and Eastern Europe's largest deals and one of the largest foreign investments in Austria. Mobiltel was the first Bulgarian operator to offer EDGE, UMTS, HSDPA, HSPA+ and second to offer LTE services to its clients, with video telephony services being available since 6 March 2006 in the capital Sofia and since mid-July 2006 throughout the Bulgarian Black Sea resorts.

The company was the official sponsor of Bulgarian football club PFC Levski Sofia. Since 2005, the company also organizes the strong annual M-Tel Masters chess tournament, which is attended by six of the world's best International Grandmasters.

Despite the difficult economic environment affecting the entire IT and Telco industry in Bulgaria, Mobiltel's performance remains stable with a customer base of 5.3 million. The postpaid subscribers increased from 61% to roughly 66%. Mobiltel's market share by end Q1/2011 stays at 49.3%.

The Mtel network uses the access code 88. Until 2003, it also used the codes 89 and 87, which had been added as the network had expanded. In mid-2003, however, mobile numbers in Bulgaria increased by one digit and the M-Тel network code returned to being 88 only.

Mobiltel owns Loop, the largest virtual mobile operator operating in Bulgaria, specially designed for young customers. In 2011 Mtel created a pre-paid service for cheap telephone calls, SMS and mobile Internet Bob, which is also available in Austria and Slovenia.

In 2012 M-tel was rebranded with a new logo, and the dash in the name was removed leaving Mtel (Мтел) as shown in the new logo.

On 28 July 2015, Mtel and Max signed a contract for national roaming. This is the first agreement for sharing networks in the Bulgarian telecom market.

On 29 July 2015, Mobiltel said it has agreed to buy cable TV and internet service provider Blizoo. On 18 September 2015, CPC gave green light of the deal and the merger was done by the end of the year.

On 15 September 2016, Mtel became the official sponsor of the most successful Bulgarian football club CSKA Sofia. From 2016 to 2017 season, Mtel became the team's principal shirt sponsor.

On 14 January 2017 Mtel launched its own pay television sports pack – MAX Sport (then under the brand Mtel Sport), consisting of two TV channels.

As of 22 May 2018, the company is operating under the A1 brand.

== Network ==
A1 has currently deployed a few different mobile networks. The company was first to launch GSM, GPRS, HSPA, HSPA+ and test LTE in Bulgaria. They also have fiber optic internet offered in most large cities (thanks to recent acquisition of former blizoo). In 2012 A1 (Formerly Mtel) announced DTH. As of 2016 depending on a viewer's location A1 can offer to IPTV (marketed as interactive television), CATV (former blizoo), HSPA, HSPA+, LTE and fiber internet (up to 1 Gbit/s).

=== Mobile Network ===
A1 currently operates 2G, 3G, 4G, and limited amounts of 5G to their wireless subscribers. They offer both prepaid and postpaid plans, with different data, calling, and messaging allotments. As per Opensignal's 2021 report, A1 ties with Vivacom in both download and upload speed, with Yettel Bulgaria in third place regarding download and upload speed. Meanwhile, Vivacom beats A1 in 4G availability, leaving both A1 and Telenor in 2nd and 3rd place.

=== Television ===
A1 offers satellite television, and cable television as part of select packages to their customers.

==== IPTV ====
A1's IPTV is marketed as interactive television.

==== CATV ====
A1 acquired blizoo in June 2015 as a result the company now has access to up to 1.5 million people thanks to blizoo's DVB-C network. Most of the network is FTTB.

==== DTH ====
In 2012, after big commercials, A1 announced DTH.

==== A1 Xplore TV (formerly A1 Now, Mtel Now) ====
After many unsuccessful tries with mobile IPTV, A1 finally made a breakthrough with its latest new service called A1 Xplore TV. As of June 2016 it has been free for current television users (including blizoo's). A1 Xplore TV offers up to 74 channels (as of April 2018), some in HD on all type of devices. The app is available in Google Play Store and AppStore.

=== Broadband Internet ===
A1's first major investment was in Megalan Networks.

== See also ==
- List of mobile network operators in Europe
