= Access Info Europe =

Madrid-based advocacy group

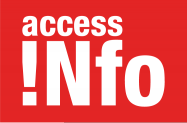
- Formation: 2006
- Type: Non profit organisation
- Headquarters: Madrid, Spain
- Vice President and Executive Director: Helen Darbishire
- Website: www.access-info.org

Access Info Europe is a Madrid-based group that campaigns for access to information in Europe.

It was formed in June 2006 by experts in access to information, with the aim of promoting the right of access to information in Europe. Access Info is a not-for-profit, non-governmental organization.

The core of Access-Info Europe raison d'être is the belief that access to information is a basic human right, and the idea that this is critical for participatory government decision-making and accountability.

== Issues ==
Primary issues include transparency in the European Union; civil liberties; leak handling; right to information; open government; and commercial transparency.

EU transparency involves reform of access to EU documents, transparency in the EU legislative process, citizen participation in decision-making, and commercial transparency.

Civil liberties includes the implications of anti-terror laws.

Leaks involves training for investigative journalists and legal support over controversies.

Commercial transparency opens access to commercial information and transparency of media ownership

== Access Info Europe v. Council of the European Union ==
On December 3, 2008, Access Info Europe applied to the Council to request access to documents on a policy proposal concerning a regulation of the European Parliament and other documents in the European Union. Access Info applied under Regulation No 1049/2001. The Council responded by making public only part of the requested document and withheld portions that disclosed the positions expressed by Member States. The Council invoked Article 4(3) of the Regulation that governs disclosure exceptions. It explained that such disclosures would have undermined the Council's decision-making process.

On February 26, 2009, the Council sent Access Info an unregistered letter stating additional reasons for its response. Access Info said that it did not receive the letter until April 3, via email. Access Info then applied to the European Court of Justice on June 3, within the 2 month time limit allowed by the Regulation. The appeal came within 2 months of the email notification, but more than 2 months after the February date.

The Court decided that the time limit had not expired. The Court further decided that the exceptions provided in Article 4 of the Regulation must be applied in a restrictive way.

The Court stated that the public has the right to know how decisions are taken in this field and that this should be subject to public oversight.

According to Global Freedom of Expression, the Court decision established a binding/persuasive precedent within its jurisdiction. The Court reasoned that any exceptions to the public's right of access to European Parliament, Council and Commission documents must be strictly applied, to protect the public right of access. It further ruled that the purpose of Regulation No 1049/2001 is to give the public the widest possible right of access to information.

== See also ==
- Access to public information in Europe
- Freedom of information
- Freedom of information laws by country
- International Right to Know Day
- Transparency of media ownership in Europe
