= Ognyanovo =

Ognyanovo may refer to the following places in Bulgaria:

- Ognyanovo, Blagoevgrad Province
- Ognyanovo, Dobrich Province
- Ognyanovo, Pazardzhik Province
- Ognyanovo, Sofia Province
