= Joint Declaration =

- Sino-British Joint Declaration
- Sino-Portuguese Joint Declaration
- Joint Declaration on the Doctrine of Justification
- Joint Declaration by Members of the United Nations, in 1942 by the American and British governments on behalf of the Allied Powers, relating to the Holocaust
- June 15th North–South Joint Declaration
- Joint Declaration: Challenges to Freedom of Expression in the next decade
