= Bistrets =

Bistrets may refer to the following places in Bulgaria:

- Bistrets, Burgas Province
- Bistrets, Dobrich Province
