= Max Telecom =

Bulgarian telecommunications company

- Type: joint stock company
- Industry: mobile telecommunications
- Founded: 2005
- Fate: Insolvency (2018)
- Headquarters: Sofia, Bulgaria
- Key people: Neycho Velichkov, CEO; Daniel Kupsin, Chairmen of board
- Products: Internet services
- Website: maxtelecom.bg

Max Telecom was a mobile telecommunications company and internet service provider (ISP) in Bulgaria. It was launched in October 2007 by Krasimir Stoychev, the founder of Bulgaria's first GSM operator MobilTel (in 1994), as Max Telecom. Max Telecom has license for operating the telecommunication services through a network of "point-to-multipoint" with national coverage, the service is also known as WiMAX. This type of network allows fixed and mobile services, including Internet access, virtual private networks (VPN), voice services, video services and IPTV. The company is the first to launch commercial LTE network in Bulgaria. In May the company rebranded with new logo and began promoting itself simply as "Max".

The company was begun in 2005 after a WiMAX licence was secured. The company is thus Bulgaria's fourth mobile and first 4G network. As of September 2008, coverage included most of the country's larger cities. Telephone numbers in the network begin with the code 0999.

In March 2014 the company announced that it has switched to LTE due to economic reasons and that it will be ready to launch its LTE Summer 2014 for the customers. In the conference it was also mentioned for the first time that Netflix will be available in Bulgaria again Summer the same year. This, however, was never confirmed by any official from Netflix, but the official page was created on 17 March 2014, confirming that the company planned to start its service soon.

On May 21, 2014 in official press-conference Max Telecom unveiled brand new logo, and changed its name, dropping the Telecom and leaving the simple Max. It also announced the launch of the first LTE network in Bulgaria. Currently only 6 cities are covered, Sofia, Stara Zagora, Sliven, Bansko, Ruse and Pleven.

Max Telecom is launched its VoLTE service based on the open-source SIP-Server Kamailio. With this approach, were one of the first mobile operators in the world, who will rely on open-source technology.

On July 28, 2015 Mtel and Max have signed a contract for national roaming. This is the first agreement for sharing networks in the Bulgarian telecom market.

The Sofia city court declared on Monday local telecommunications operator Max Telecom insolvent in a case instituted at the request of local M Sat Cable over a 116.2 million levs ($67.3 million/59.4 million euro) debt, documents filed with the commercial register showed.

== Coverage ==
As of May 2014 WiMAX network has full coverage in the following cities: Sofia, Plovdiv, Pazardjik, Burgas, Varna, Sliven, Blagoevgrad, Veliko Turnovo, Asenovgrad, Dupnica, Pernik, Sandanski, Kyustendil, Petrich, Bankia, Nesebur, Kostinbrod, in the resorts Bansko, Pamporovo, Golden Sands, Sunny beach and the villages near Sofia – Vladaya, Bistrica, Dragalevci and Boyana. Since July 2015, the newest towns to join the Max network include Kavarna, Balchik, Obzor, Sunny Beach, Nesebar, Pomorie, Chernomorets, Sozopol, Primorsko, Lozenetz, Ahtopol and Tzarevo. Along with its existing network in “Golden Sands”, “St. Konstantin and Elena” and last year's Varna and Burgas, Max now offers 4G LTE in the most visited seaside resorts on the Bulgarian Black Sea Coast. In addition, Elin Pelin and Bojurishte, located near Sofia, also become part of Max’ coverage.

== Insolvency ==
The Sofia city court declared on Dec, 17th 2018 local telecommunications operator Max Telecom insolvent in a case instituted at the request of local M Sat Cable over a 116.2 million levs ($67.3 million/59.4 million euro) debt, documents filed with the commercial register showed. In January 2017 the two companies reached an agreement that Max Telecom would repay its outstanding liabilities to M Sat Cable, which totalled 67.6 million levs at the time, in two installments over the next two months, data from the court ruling showed. However, Max Telecom failed to make the two payments and subsequently accumulated further debt, according to the court. The court also considered a claim by Nokia Solutions and Networks and confirmed that Max Telecom has an unpaid debt to the company amounting to 2.3 million levs, dating from 2016.
