= Access to public information in Europe =

Public access to information maintained by government agencies in Europe

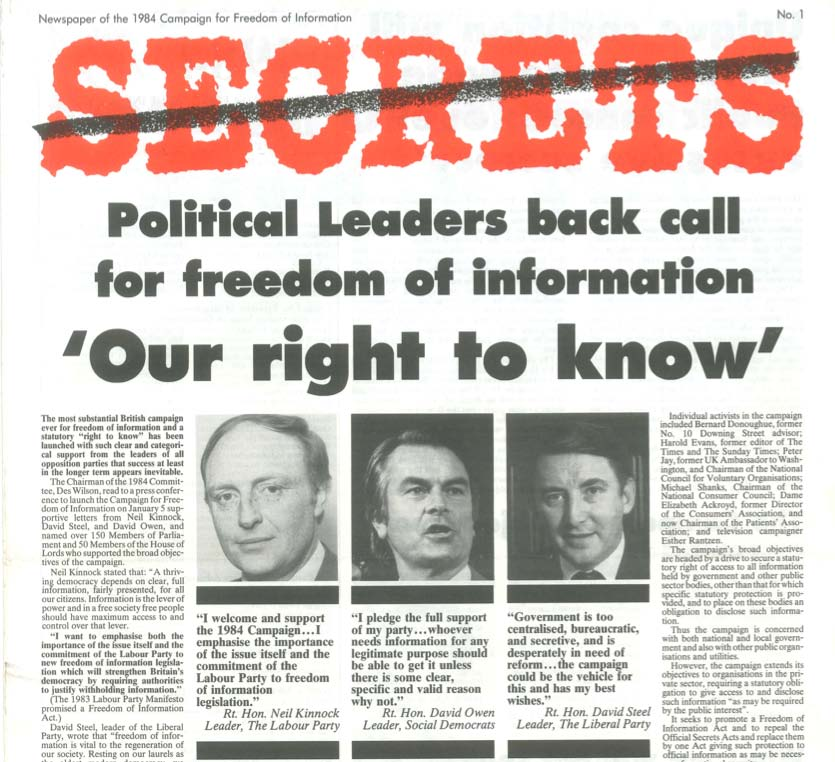
First edition of CFOI journal 'Secrets'

Access to public information and freedom of information (FOI) refer to the right to access information held by public bodies also known as "right to know". Access to public information is considered of fundamental importance for the effective functioning of democratic systems, as it enhances governments' and public officials' accountability, boosting people's participation and allowing their informed participation into public life. The fundamental premise of the right to access public information is that the information held by governmental institutions is in principle public and may be concealed only on the basis of legitimate reasons which should be detailed in the law. Access to public information builds on the principle that in a democratic system people should be in the condition of accessing a wide range of information in order to effectively participate in public life as well as on matters affecting them.

The right of access to public information is a component of the fundamental right of freedom of expression set forth by Article 19 of the Universal Declaration of Human Rights (1948) which states that the fundamental right of freedom of expression encompasses the freedom "to seek, receive and impart information and ideas through any media and regardless of frontiers". Access to public information and freedom of information are recognised as human rights in the three main regional systems of human rights, namely within the Americas, Europe and Africa, as well as in major international instruments.

The right to access information places two obligations on public bodies. First, the proactive duty to make public key information on the activities of authorities and governments; second, the reactive obligation to respond to people's requests for information, either by releasing public original documents or copies of the documents held.

Over the past 10 years, the right to information and access to public information has been recognised in an increasing number of countries and several FOI laws have been adopted all over the world, including in the developing countries. If in 1990 only 13 countries had a national freedom of information law, today there are 100 such laws across the world.

In 2015, The UNESCO General Conference voted to designate Sept. 28 as "International Day for the Universal Access to Information" or, as it is more commonly known, Access to Information Day. The date had previously been celebrated as "Right to Know Day" since 2002. The UNESCO resolution recommends approval by the UN General Assembly.

== Overview ==
The right to access information builds on the principle that the public has a right to know how power is exercised and public money is spent, given that public bodies are elected by people and sustained by taxpayers. The access to public information is a precondition for governments' and public officials' accountability and it enables the adoption of informed decisions by citizens, hence representing a fundamental element for the proper functioning of democratic systems. International standards and evolving jurisprudence have confirmed that information held by public bodies belong to the public. The Council of Europe Convention on Access to Official Documents (2009) states that "all official documents are in principle public and can be withheld subject only to the protection of other rights and legitimate interests".

More than 100 countries around the world have now adopted national access to information laws to make the right to know effective. The first law on access to public information was adopted in Sweden in 1766, but after that it took almost two centuries to have the second law approved in Finland in 1951 and then in the United States in 1966. During the 1970s and 1980s there has been a small but constant growth in FOI's laws, with a real expansion after 1989 due to the activism of civil society groups in Central and Eastern Europe during the post-Communist transitions to democracy. Indeed, the big push forward in the field of access to information leading to the broadening of the definition and of the scope of the right of access to information came together with a coordinated civil society reaction to contrast the control over the information exercised by Communist regimes in the Soviet bloc. It was this movement which fuelled the development of 'access to information' as a right in the sense of a human right. A 1992 decision of the Hungary's Constitutional Court established that access to information is a "fundamental right" that enable citizens to have an oversight on the lawfulness and efficiency of the government. Moreover, environmentalist groups and consumer associations also contributed to the affirmation of the right to know.

All the eight former communists countries which joined the European Union in 2004 had a freedom of information law; also Romania and Bulgaria had their own law when joined the EU in 2007 and Croatia had already had an access to information law in force for ten years when it joined the EU in 2013.

Nowadays, in the OSCE region 48 of the 56 member states have specific access to information laws.

The right to access information places two obligations on governments and public bodies. First, the duty to make public key information on the activities implemented by public bodies; second, the obligation to respond to people's requests of accessing documents, either by making available the original documents or by sharing copies of documents and information held.

Access to information is a right which comprises two parts. The first is a proactive component, namely the positive obligation of public bodies to provide, make public and disseminate information about their activities, budgets and policies so that citizens can understand what public bodies are doing, can participate in public life and can monitor the behaviour of public authorities. The second component is a reactive one, entailing the right of all persons to requests information and documents to public bodies, along with the right to receive an answer. In principle, all the main information held by public bodies should be available, while exceptions to disclosure should be grounded on the protection of other values, such as privacy, national security or commercial interests.

On the occasion of the first officially recognised Access to Information Day celebrated on 28 September 2016, European civil society groups working to enhance the right of access to public information raised some concerns as, despite significant progress, there are still far-reaching shortcomings especially with regard to transparency of decision-making. According to such organisations, among the main obstacles to government openness there is the inadequate record keeping of public bodies’ information: minutes of public officials’ meetings are not recorded, exchange with lobbyists are not available, public decisions are adopted without proper justification or documented evidence available to the public. An additional problem concerns the over-application of exceptions with particular regard to the use of the privacy reasons, applied to not disclose the activities of public officials when performing public functions. Moreover, European civil society organisations are particularly concerned for the lack of transparency around the decision-making process at both national and EU level, as in the case of the refusal by the EU to disclose documents on the EU-Turkey refugee deal.

== Access to information as a human right ==
A big push forward the advancement of the right to access information as a fundamental right was due to the activism of civil society movements which contrasted the regimes' control over information in the Communist countries in the Soviet bloc. A fundamental document in this sense is a 1992's decision of the Hungarian Constitutional Court which established that access to information is a "fundamental right" essential for citizen oversight on the lawfulness and efficiency of the government.

Progressively, several national and international courts decisions have been treating access to information as a basic human right, thus providing a strong legal case for citizens resorting to courts to defend any refusals by authorities to provide access to public information. Such decisions are grounded on a series of international declarations, human rights covenants and conventions at international, regional and EU levels. In the first place, the right to access public information is recognised as a fundamental right and as a component of the right of freedom of expression in the Article 19 of the Universal Declaration of Human Rights; in the Article 19 of the International Covenant of Civil and Political Rights; and in the Article 13 of the American Convention on Human Rights. At regional level, all the three main regional systems of human rights, namely within the Americas, Europe and Africa, have recognised freedom of information as a universal human right. In July 2011, the United Nations Human Rights Committee confirmed that the right to freedom of expression enshrined in Article 19 of the International Covenant on Civil and Political Rights includes the right of access public information.

At the European Union level, Article 42 of the European Charter of Fundamental Rights establishes the right of access to EU institutions documents, as recognised also by Article 15 of the Treaty on the Functioning of the EU ("Treaty of Lisbon"). In 2009, the European Court of Human Rights on the basis of Article 10 of the European Convention on Human Rights, which is the article on freedom of expression, acknowledged the fundamental right of access to information held by public bodies. Specifically, the Court established that the right to information is protected in particular in case of "information monopoly", namely when the public bodies are the only ones owning the requested information, and when the information is needed by media or civil society organisations for public accountability purposes. The decision of the European Court embraced a 2006 decision by the Inter-American Court of Human Rights which endorsed Article 13 of the American Human Rights convention stating that individuals have the right to request information to public authorities and public authorities have the positive obligation to provide such information.

Finally, many countries across the world recognise the right to information or access to documents in their Constitutions, either within the frame of the right to freedom of expression or separately and specifically as the right of access to information or documents. At least 50 countries all over the world, including 29 OSCE countries, have Constitutions including such provisions.

== Societal benefits of access to public information: accountability, participation, efficiency ==
Transparency enhanced through the right to access public information entails a series of core benefits for democratic societies, in particular accountability, participation and efficiency. First, access to public information enhances public accountability as it contributes to make governments and public officials more accountable for their actions and decisions. Second, the right to know boosts public participation by making information available information that can help citizens to make more effective decisions on matters that directly affect their lives and to participate with informed opinions in public debates and in the decision-making process. Third, access to public information contributes to the efficiency of decision-making as disclosure encourages public institutions to better manage and organise information and may help to improve communication between public bodies. Access to information serve some other social goals. For instance, access to medical records can help individuals to improve personal decision-making and make better decisions about medical treatment, financial planning and the like. Finally, access to information can facilitate effective business practices as some of the information held by public bodies related to economic issues can be very useful for enterprises and can therefore contribute to increasing the effectiveness of the business sector.

== International standards and laws ==
At national level access to public information is regulated by freedom of information laws. In addition to national legislation, principles and standards for access to public information are set forth into several international declarations and treaties that have authoritatively recognised the fundamental and legal nature of the right to freedom of information along with the need for effective legislations that should guarantee the respect of that right in practice. Such international laws and standards include:

- Civil society standards and declarations: these include the Ten Principles on the Right to Know by the Justice Initiative (2005); the Public's Right to Know - Principles on Freedom of Information Legislation by Article 19 (1999); the Atlanta Declaration and Plan of Action for the Advancement of the Right of Access to Information (2008); the Budapest Declaration on Right of Access to Information (2008); the Transparency Charter for International Financial Institutions: Claiming our Right to Know by the Global Transparency Initiative (2006); the Declaration on Parliamentary Openness (2012);
- International treaties: these include the Council of Europe Convention on Access to Official Documents (2009) and the Aarhus Convention on Access to Information, Public Participation and Access to Justice in Environmental Matters (1999);
- Inter-governmental Principles and Recommendations: these include the Principles on the Right of Access to Information by the Organisation of American States (2000); the Council of Europe Recommendation 2002(2) on access to official documents (2002); the Declaration of Principles on Freedom of Expression in Africa by the African Commission on Human and Peoples’ Rights (2002); the UNESCO's Maputo Declaration on Fostering Freedom of Expression, Access to Information and Empowerment of People (2008); the UNESCO's Brisbane Declaration on Freedom of Information; the Dakar Declaration on Media and Good Governance (2005);
- Annual reports of the United Nations Special Rapporteur on Freedom of Opinion and Expression: the UN Special Rapporteur has addressed the issue of freedom of information in its annual reports since 1997. After that, the Commission on Human Rights endorsed the commentaries of the Special Rapporteur and asked him to elaborate further on the right to seek and receive information. As a consequence, the UN Special Rapporteur expanded significantly his commentary on freedom of information in his 2000 annual Reports.

== Access to public information: guiding principles ==
The non-governmental organisation ARTICLE 19 has published a set of principles called "The Public's Right To Know: Principles on Freedom of Information Legislation" which describes the best practices and standards on freedom of information legislation based on international and regional laws as well as on evolving national practices and legislations. Such principles, which are designed mainly for national laws, are also applicable to inter-governmental bodies such as the United Nations and the European Union.

=== Principle 1: Maximum disclosure ===
The principle of maximum disclosure sets a presumption that all information held by public bodies should be covered by the scope of access to information laws. This presumption accepts only limited circumstances for exceptions. This principle incorporates the very basic rationale underpinning the concept of freedom of information. It entails that public authorities seeking to deny access to public information have the obligation to justifying their refusal. The principle of maximum disclosure provides for a broad definition of "public bodies" which are subject to the duty of releasing information. Such a broad interpretation includes all branches of government, e.g. local governments, elected bodies, nationalised industries and public corporations, judicial bodies and also private bodies carrying out public functions. Principle 1 requires the law to establish minimum standards regarding the maintenance and preservation of documents by public bodies.

=== Principle 2: Obligation to publish ===
This principle implies the obligation for public bodies to respond to access to information requests and to publish and disseminate documents of public interest. Few reasonable limits based, for instance, on resources and capacity can be accepted. As a minimum, public authorities should make public the following types of information:

- operational information on the functioning of public bodies, including objectives, results and costs;
- information on any requests or complaints that people may take in relation of a given public body;
- information on how members of the public may provide their contribution to the policy-making process;
- the types and formats of information held by public bodies;
- information on decisions and policies affecting the public, along with background information on those decisions and the evidence that led to their formulation.

=== Principle 3: Promotion of open government ===
This principle calls governments to actively promote a culture of openness in order to enhance the respect of the right to know. This is important as experiences in different countries have shown that recalcitrant public authorities can undermine the application of even the most progressive legislations. National laws should therefore allocate adequate resources to the promotion of an open government culture and the goals of FOI laws, including by means of internal codes on access and openness, educational programmes, media coverage and communications campaigns. Such activities should also be aimed at contrasting the culture of official secrecy within government for example through trainings for public officials. An important step in this direction has been adopted in 2011 with the establishment of a new global alliance of democratic countries committed to the promotion of transparency, accountability and participation under the label Open Government Partnership

=== Principle 4: Limited scope of exceptions ===
Exceptions to disclosure should be grounded on clearly and narrowly defined exceptions. Public authorities should show that a refusal to provide the required information has passed a test through which to assess if the disclosure of a given information threaten to cause substantial harm to a legitimate aim and if the harm is greater than the public interest in having the information. Non-disclosure decisions should be taken on a case-by-case basis. National laws should provide an exhaustive list of the legitimate reasons that may justify non-disclosure. Such a list should be narrowly defined and include only highly relevant interests to be protected, such as law enforcement, privacy, national security, commercial and other confidentiality, public or individual safety and the integrity of the decision-making process. However, even if can be demonstrated that disclosure would cause substantial harm to a legitimate interest, the information should be released when the benefits of disclosure prevail over the harm. In other words, the harm to the legitimate interest must be weighed against the public interest in having a given information publicly available.

=== Principle 5: Processes to facilitate access ===
According to this principle requests for public information should be processed quickly and fairly and an independent review of any refusals should be made available to the applicant. Also, public bodies are called to set up open, accessible systems for implementing freedom of information laws and thus ensuring the public's right to receive the required information. Furthermore, the law should establish an individual right to appeal to an independent body for any refusal by a public body to release information. All members of the public should be in the condition of accessing to appeal procedures without incurring in undue costs and complicated procedures.

=== Principle 6: Costs ===
This principle states that costs for accessing public information should not be so high as to deter applicants from making the request. Around the world there are different cost regimes, including, for instance, flat fees systems for each request and graduated fees depending on the actual cost of retrieving and reproducing the information and / or the documents requested.

=== Principle 7: Open meetings ===
Freedom of information comprises the public's right to know how the government behaves on behalf of people and to participate to decision-making. Freedom of information law should thus incorporates the presumption that all relevant meetings of governing bodies, i.e. those involved in decision-making, should be open to the public. Meetings may be closed, but only when sound reasons for closure exist. Such reasons have to be clearly explained and closure have to comply to established procedures.

=== Principle 8: Disclosure takes precedence ===
Other laws dealing with publicly held information should be consistent with the principle of maximum disclosure and the other principles underpinning freedom of information. In particular, the regime of exceptions should be clearly defined in the freedom of information legislation; extensions of the exceptions regime should not be allowed by other laws.

=== Principle 9: Protection for whistleblowers ===
Whistleblowers, i.e. individuals who make publicly available information on government's wrongdoings - including for instance corruption, dishonesty, maladministration, serious threat to health, safety or the environment, etc. - should be protected from any legal, administrative or other kind of sanctions. In this context the public interest refers to situations where the benefit of disclosure prevails over the harm, no matter how the disclosure has been conducted. This applies in particular when there are exceptionally serious reasons for releasing a certain information, such as a serious threat to public health or safety, or when there is a strong evidence that wrongdoing will be concealed or destroyed.

== Access to public information: main features ==
=== Universal access ===
Being a fundamental and universal right, in principle access to information is a right to everyone: almost all national freedom of information laws recognise this by establishing that "anyone" may make a request to access public information. One noteworthy exception among the world's democracies is Canada where only citizens and residents are entitled to submit access to information requests. Despite this, a major practical obstacle to the universal exercise of the right to access information is due to the obligation to submit the requests in the official language of the country which may hamper the exercise of the right to know for people that does not have a command of a country's official language.

In the EU, according to the treaties the right to access documents and the right to appeal to the European Ombudsman applies only to EU citizens, residents and companies registered inside the EU. While in general anyone whose right has been violated can appeal to the European Court of Justice, in the case of the right to access information the Court is obliged to accept cases made by EU citizens, residents and businesses.

=== Kind of information and documents to be made available under access to information laws ===
In principle, all information held by public bodies can be accessed upon a FOI's request, unless some exceptions can be applied (e.g. on the ground of protecting state interests; private interests or human rights, or to ensure effective governments). Some national laws refer to "access to information" while others to "access to documents": even if these definitions actually overlap, it can be useful for the applicant to be aware of the exact phrasing used by the law in order to formulate properly the access to information request, and thus, having more chance of success. Usually "documents" and "information" should be made available whatever its medium, e.g. written on paper or in electronic format, or as a sound, visual or audiovisual. The EU Regulation 1049/2001 specifies that documents subject to access to information are those concerning "policies, activities and decisions falling within the institutions’ sphere of responsibility" and this applies to all documents held by the EU institutions "in all areas of activity of the European Union".

=== Public bodies concerned by access to information ===
In general in Europe the right of access to information applies to all administrative bodies, at any level of government, from central government to local authorities. Some rare exceptions to this can be found, as in the case of Ireland where police forces are exempted. In addition to administrative bodies, in national legislations which have been progressively approved the obligation to disclose information has been extended also to legislative and judicial bodies. Moreover, in many countries also some private bodies performing public functions or receiving public funds are obliged to respond to access to information requests. For instance, in Macedonia which adopted an access to information law in 2006, the right to access applies to local and national governments, legislative bodies and judicial authorities, and encompasses also private bodies with public functions.

==== Inter-governmental organisations ====
Many inter-governmental bodies hold information about policies and decisions affecting people's lives. While the EU has defined a set of rules regulating access to information held by EU institutions, the debate is still open about whether the right of access information applies to inter-governmental organisations which are outside the scope of national laws and have not signed international human rights conventions. Campaigning organisations have worked for the adoption of internal rules - called "disclosure policies" or "access to information policies" - so that inter-governmental organisations could apply rules similar to national access to information laws. The World Bank adopted its Access to Information Policy in July 2010.

== Standard exceptions to the right to information ==
Although in principles the right of access to information applies to all information held by public bodies, it is not an absolute right as there can be some exceptions not allowing the disclosure of certain kind of information. If released this information can violate some "legitimate interests", disturb public life or undermine other societal values. To justify the withhold of public information, authorities have the burden of the proof, thus have to demonstrate that disclosure would cause harm to a legitimate interest as specified by the law.

International laws and standards in the field of access to public information provide for three categories of standard exceptions. Specifically,

Exceptions to protect state interests or international relations, such as:

- National security and defence of the state;
- International relations;
- Public safety or public order;
- Economic, monetary and exchange rate policies of the state;

Exceptions aimed at ensuring effective government:

- Protection of internal public bodies’ deliberations prior to decision-making (known as "space to think" exception);
- Protection of criminal enquiries;

Exceptions to protect private interests and human rights, such as:

- Privacy and other legitimate private interests;
- Commercial and other economic interests like, for instance, trade secrets;
- The environment;
- Guaranteeing the effective administration of justice and equality of parties before the courts.

However, even if the requested information or documents are sensitive and exceptions apply, some part of it could be released by public bodies on the ground of two factors. The first is the right of partial access according to which authorities have the duty of removing sensitive information and release the rest of the document. The second "exception to exceptions" applies when transparency overrides secrecy, thus even if the information is sensitive the public interest in knowing it is stronger. In this particular case public officials have to apply the so-called "public interest test", meaning that they have to scrutinize and ponder both the exceptions for not releasing information and the reasons of public interest in knowing the information required. Many national access to information laws foresees this kind of test.

== Right to appeal ==
Applicant have the right to appeal in case of "administrative silence" (i.e. the request is not answered), when public authorities reject the disclosure request or when their reply is not satisfying and does not meaningfully answer the question. Rules regulating the right to appeal depends on national legislations and vary from country to country. Generally, there are four main appeals mechanisms:

- Internal or Administrative Appeal: internal review is addressed to the same authority that issued the denial or made a non-satisfying disclosure or to the administrative body which is immediately superior;
- Administrative or Higher Court Appeal: appeal to administrative court is usually the step following internal review. This is regulated by administrative law and the competent authority entitled to examine the appeal are regional or national administrative courts. A further appeal to a higher court, including the European Court of Human Rights, is also possible.
- Information Commission/er Appeal: in this case the appeal is scrutinised by a dedicated body whose specific role is to protect the right to access information. Such bodies can issue binding decisions as well as non-binding recommendations, depending on national laws. The decisions of the Information Commissioner can always go to appeal. In the OSCE region, Information Commissions exist in 16 countries.
- Ombudsman Appeal: in some countries, the Ombudsman - which is the institution whose role is to protect the rights of citizens vis à vis public authorities - has also the function to examine complains related to access to information. In many cases the Ombudsman's decision is only a recommendation, i.e. a non-binding measure, although usually his/her opinion is taken in due consideration by public authorities. At the EU level, the European Ombudsman is responsible for processing complaints concerning access to documents.

== Access to public information in practice ==
=== Request's contents ===
Requests for accessing public information to the public authorities covered by the scope of national laws should be as clear and specific as possible about the information or documents required. A well-formulated request will facilitate the work of public officials and will more likely result in a positive answer or at least reducing the reasons for rejecting the request. Usually the name and address of the person filing the request have to be provided. Giving also the e-mail address as well as a phone number might facilitate the exchange with public officials. In some countries requests made by resorting to pseudonyms or anonymously are permitted.

=== Procedure ===
In general, the procedure for requesting public information under national laws is simple and does not foresee many formalities. Usually requests can be filed in writing, either by post or hand-delivered to the concerned public authority. In most countries, submission is allowed also by e-mail. Moreover, some access to information laws permit oral requests, made, for instance, by phone or in person. However, in some cases, such as in Slovenia, oral request are not considered to be a formal basis for going to appeal. In some countries, such as in Armenia or Romania, rules and timeframes for written requests and oral requests are different.

=== Fees ===
Filing a request for accessing public information should always be free of charge, as confirmed by the Council of Europe Convention on Access to Official Documents which allows only costs for copying and delivering the documents, such as photocopying, postage costs, or costs of reproduction into other formats or materials in case of DVDs or CDs. As a rule, electronic delivery is free of charge. The majority of countries in the Council of Europe region comply with this rule, even if there are notable exceptions, such as Ireland and Germany where, however, the required fees can be significantly reduced on the ground of public interest.

=== Modalities of getting the information ===
In reply of a formal request of accessing public information, the examination of the required information can be allowed in different ways, including the inspection of original documents; photocopies sent by post or e-mails; copies in DVDs or CDs.

=== Timeframes for getting a reply ===
There is a great variability across Europe on the timeframes for public authorities to answer requests as well as for notifying the extension of the timeframe for justified reasons or for issuing a refusal. However, the average time is about 15 working days. In Europe, the countries with the shortest timeframe for response are Norway and Sweden (1–3 days). On the contrary, the Albanian and Austrian access to information laws give the authorities a period of respectively 40 and 60 days to respond to people's requests. Most national laws allow the extension of the timeframe in case of requests which are particularly complex. For instance, according to the Act on the Openness of Government Activities, when a request is made to a Finnish authority, access must be granted within two weeks of the request being received, or within one month if the request necessitates more work by the authority than is typically required.^{: §14} In all cases such extension should be notified to the applicant, along with an explanation of the reasons that led to it. At the EU level, the Regulation 1049/2001 establishes 15 working days for issuing a response; an extension of up 15 additional working days may be applied in exceptional cases, for instance when the request relates to long documents or a large number of documents.

== See also ==
- Freedom of information
- Freedom of information laws by country
- International Right to Know Day
- Transparency of media ownership in Europe
- Directorate-General for Information Society and Media (European Commission)
- Citizen oversight
- Transparency
