= Joint Declaration: Challenges to Freedom of Expression in the next decade =

2019 joint declaration about free speech

The Twentieth Anniversary Joint Declaration: Challenges to Freedom of Expression in the next decade (TAJD: CFEnd) was published in 2019 by representatives of intergovernmental bodies to protect free media and expression. Jointly and annually, the United Nations (UN), the Organization for Security and Co-operation in Europe (OSCE), the Organization of American States (OAS) and the African Commission on Human and Peoples' Rights (ACHPR) publish the results of their discussions about a topic. During these discussions, each organization is a representative (or rapporteur) of a specific human right.

During their 2019 discussion of freedom of expression, the UN was the special rapporteur on freedom of opinion and expression. The OSCE was the representative on freedom of the media, the OAS was the special rapporteur on freedom of expression, and the ACHPR was the special rapporteur on freedom of expression and access to information. They aimed to provide guidance to governments, civil society organizations, legal professionals, journalists and media outlets, academics, and the business sector.

== Protocol ==
The first part of the declaration consists of a protocol of achievements, apprehensions, and aspirations. The representatives believed that the 20 previous declarations have contributed to the establishment of authoritative standards which address a wide range of issues and challenges, including the importance of freedom of expression to democracy, sustainable development, protecting other rights, and efforts to counter terrorism, propaganda, and incitement to violence.

All parties have expressed concern about increasing violence against, and prosecution of, reporters, activists, and journalists exercising their right to freedom of expression. Although significant contributions from new digital technologies have made expanding global communication easier, leading to the possibility of people everywhere accessing information and ideas and expressing themselves, the representatives acknowledged that there is room for improvement. Not everyone has access to the Internet; disinformation and propaganda spread quickly, enabling arbitrary and unlawful surveillance. The representatives expressed concern about deepening threats to media diversity and independence, including an increased concentration of media ownership and political control and censorship of public media. They stressed that all states must respect the obligations set out in Article 19 of the International Covenant on Civil and Political Rights, primarily by ensuring that any restrictions are necessary and appropriate and enabling independent judicial oversight of conditions. The representatives said that these obligations should be mandatory for private companies, with the same standards regarding human rights.

== Challenges to address ==
=== Freedom of expression ===
The authors of the declaration state that immediate action should be guaranteed to protect the safety of journalists and others who are attacked for exercising their right to freedom of expression and impunity for such attacks should be ended. States should provide media diversity and a voice to marginalized groups. The state should also explore more seriously the economic challenges faced by independent journalists and media outlets, supporting local media and mitigating the negative impacts of online advertising.

=== Free, open and inclusive Internet ===
Freedom of expression requires a digital infrastructure allowing all stakeholders to participate equally. The state should expand initiatives to provide universal, affordable Internet access and recognise Internet use as a human right, respecting and reinforcing network neutrality and avoiding fragmentation.

=== Private control as a threat ===
The declaration urges development, particularly because some companies have too much power over their users and online activities. More oversight, transparency, and accountability mechanisms to address private content rules, however, may be inconsistent with international human rights and interfere with individual of freedom of expression. Human-rights-sensitive solutions for online disinformation and effective rules and systems which prevent concentration of ownership and practices which abuse a dominant market position are suggested.

== Comments ==
According to David Kaye, former special rapporteur on the promotion and protection of the right to freedom of opinion and expression, "The importance and relevance of these joint declarations have been highlighted by their use in international court decisions relating to freedom of expression." Center for Law and Democracy (CLD) executive director Toby Mendel said, "The fact that Joint Declarations have been issued continuously for 20 years is a tremendous achievement. This Declaration is special inasmuch as it provides a framework to guide monitoring of future threats to freedom of expression."

== Public opinion ==
According to Article 10 of the Human Rights Act 1998, freedom of expression is a human right which includes the freedom to hold opinions and to receive and impart information and ideas without interference from public authority. The freedoms of speech and expression are not absolute, however; not all expression is protected or equally protected. Article 10 states that to protect the health of the state and its members, a government can act against freedom of expression if it is justified in the eyes of society. What constitutes freedom of expression tends to be over-determined in the United States and under-determined elsewhere. This reflects whether concrete sociopolitical needs are relevant to addressing contemporary concerns in understanding the limits of digital-age rights, and states must develop criteria which balance expressive freedoms and other values when they are in conflict.

== The Internet ==
The joint commission noted that some governments have taken measures to unduly restrict freedom of expression. On 1 June 2011, the following declaration on freedom of expression was drawn up:

General Principles
The right to freedom of expression applies to the Internet and all other media. Restrictions are only accepted if they comply with recognized international standards. Awareness-raising and education activities for individuals' responsible use of the Internet will also be promoted.
Liability of Intermediaries
Intermediaries providing technical Internet services or the search or transmission of information should not be liable for the content generated by others unless there is an order to do so.
Filtering and Blocking
Obligatory blocking of an entire website or IP address is a very strong measure and only justified if international standards prove it, for example, for the protection of children.
Criminal and Civil Liability
Jurisdiction in disputes relating to Internet content should be limited to the countries with which the cases are actually and factually related, usually because the author was resident there and the content Upload there and/or the content is specific to that country. Individuals may only refer cases to certain courts.
Network Neutrality
In the handling of Internet data and traffic there should be no discrimination based on device, content, author, service or application.
Access to the Internet
Universal access to the Internet should be promoted, as it promotes the realisation of the right to freedom of expression and other rights such as the right to education and health care. There is no justification whatsoever for banning Internet access for whole sections of the population. Universal Internet access for states is therefore mandatory. In this respect, States should establish regulatory mechanisms, which may include, for example, price regulations or licensing agreements. States should also promote awareness of Internet use and its benefits, especially among the poor, children and older people and remote rural populations. Inclusion is also important. Support should therefore be given to introducing specific measures to ensure equal access to the Internet for disabled and disadvantaged persons.
