= Daniel Kupsin =

Russian businessman (born 1977)

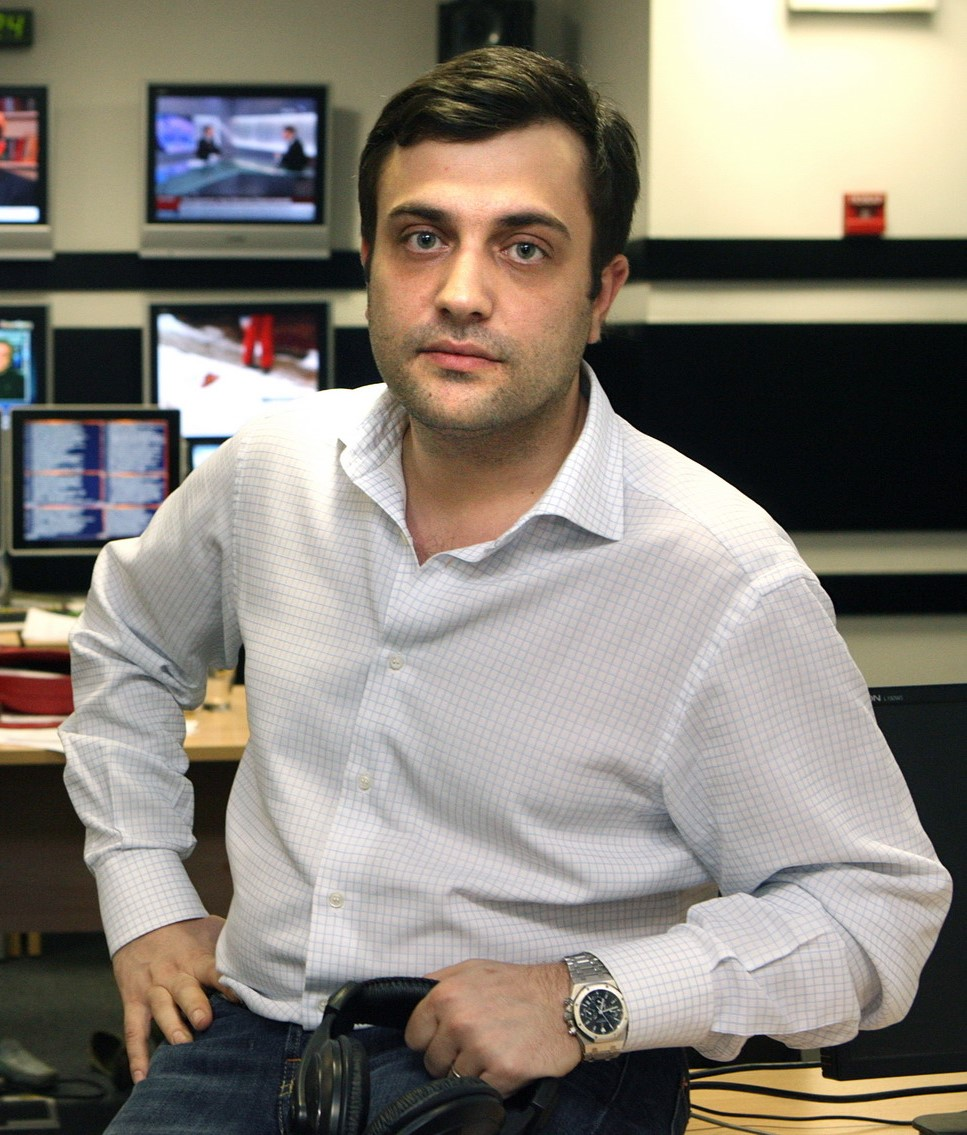
- Born: July 23, 1977 (age 48); Leningrad, Russia
- Education: Juris Doctor, State of New York

Daniel Kupsin is а financier, businessman, former general director of United Media, and creator of Business FM radio.

== Early life and education ==
Daniel Kupsin was born in Leningrad, Russia to businessman Evgeniy Veniaminovich Kupsin and his wife, Bella Kupsina, a producer.

At an early age, Kupsin moved to Switzerland, where he attended boarding school. Later he moved to the United States, where he received higher education and a degree.

In 2004, Kupsin moved from New York City to Moscow.

== Education ==
Kupsin was educated in the US, at American University (Washington). He graduated in finance and corporate finance, and then he graduated the legal magistracy at Touro College (New York). He holds a Juris Doctor in the State of New York (member of New York State Bar in 2004).

== Career ==
In 1999, while studying, Kupsin founded Neva telephone company.

In 2004 he was appointed a vice president of Corporate Finance Investment Antanta Capital.

In 2005, Kupsin led the publishing house Moscow News.

In 2006, he became CEO of his creation of the management company United Media (newspaper business & financial markets, radio stations Business FM and Cinema FM, the magazine Popular Finance).

In 2009, he took over as chairman of the board of directors of Laboratory ANVI (formerly Antiviral) from his father Evgeniy Kupsin.

== Lab ANVI ==
The NGO Antiviral was created by Evgeniy Kupsin in 1994. The biggest brands of the company are Antigrippin and Maximum Antigrippin. In 2011, the company was sold to AnviLabGroup ProtekGroup.

== Business FM ==
Business FM, the first business talk radio in Russia, discusses global economic trends. This was the first time that news in Russia was broadcast live immediately after its appearance on news agencies or events in the world. It is the first example of a continuous news flow in the business media in Russia.

Business FM began on March 1, 2007 in Moscow. Daily audiences reached more 400 thousand listeners. In the summer of 2009, United Media was sold to a group affiliated with NLMK main shareholders.

Business FM radio station has been recognized as one of the most successful projects in the domestic media market. In 2011, RSPP called Business FM the best Russian media in the field of business journalism.

== Max Telecom ==
In 2007, Max Telecom was the first company in Europe to create a mobile network of the fourth generation. The network covers about 70% of the Bulgarian population and offers a complete package of mobile Internet services.

Following the acquisition in 2013, Max Telecom acquired a license to communicate in standard LTE. In May 2014 the company began to operate the network in major cities in Bulgaria. In May, the LTE network was officially open to the public in six cities, covering 20% of the population.

Former employees of Max Telecom have been waiting for money for 6 months. Nearly 200 employees are waiting for money, and the accumulated debts are at least BGN 3,000 per person.

About 20,000 customers who signed contracts with Max Telecom also suffered. Although the mobile service has not been stopped yet, all the operator's stores are already closed.

== Corona Resort and Casino ==
In 2019, Kupsin, in partnership with Vin Group Corporation, participated in the Corona Resort & Casino project with an investment attraction of more than $2 billion. Together, they created hotels in Vietnam and several four- and five-star hotels, including Radisson Blue and Phu Quoc.

== Awards and recognition ==
In 2007, Kupsin was named "Media Manager of Russia".

In 2008 Kupsin entered the section "Media Business" in the "Top 1000 Russian Managers" organized by the publishing house Kommersant and the Russian Managers Association.

In 2012, Kupsin, Yegor Altman, and Dmitry Solopov, were the focus of the book Hooligans in business: a success story of Business FM by Yuri Voskresensky. The book, published by Alpina Publisher, became the first Russian business case for creating media business in Russia, regarding the radio station Business FM. In 2013, the book was nominated for the annual Headings Book Award.

== Family ==
Kupsin is married with four children.
