= Poruchik Kurdjievo =

- Village
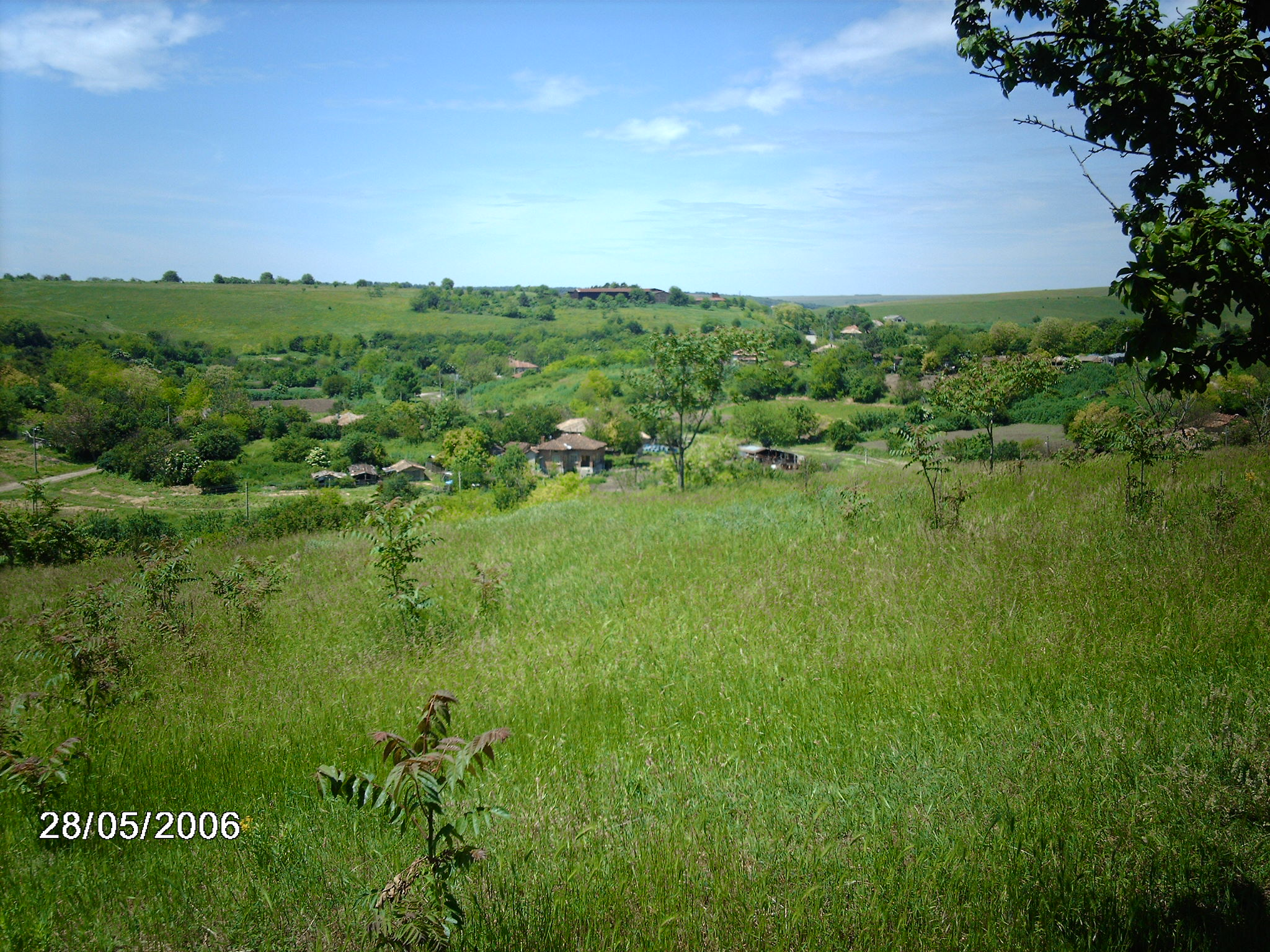
- The village in 2006

- Location in Bulgaria
- Coordinates: 43°56′35″N 27°48′00″E
- Country: Bulgaria
- Province: Dobrich Province
- Municipality: Krushari
- Time zone: UTC+2 (EET)
  - Summer (DST): UTC+3 (EEST)

Poruchik Kurdjievo is a village in the municipality of Krushari, in Dobrich Province, in northeastern Bulgaria.
