= Abrit =

- Village
- Location within Bulgaria
- Coordinates: 43°54′N 27°48′E
- Country: Bulgaria
- Province: Dobrich Province
- Municipality: Krushari
- Time zone: UTC+2 (EET)
  - Summer (DST): UTC+3 (EEST)

Abrit (historical name: Aptaat) is a village in Krushari Municipality, Dobrich Province, northeastern Bulgaria.

Abrit Nunatak on Trinity Peninsula in Antarctica is named after the village.

The village has a population of 205 inhabitants, out of which 144 (70.2%) are Bulgarian Turks, 35 (17.1%) Roma and 26 (12.7%) Bulgarians, according to the 2011 census.

Near Abrit is located the medieval fortress Zaldapa, which lies next to the lake Zaldapa.
