= Nova Makedonija =

Daily newspaper in North Macedonia

Нова Македонија Nova Makedonija
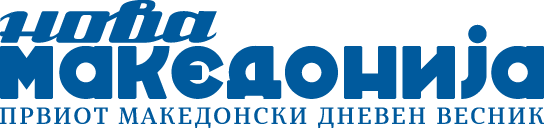
- The issue from December 27, 1944.
- Type: Daily newspaper
- Format: Berliner
- Founder: Communist Party of Yugoslavia
- Publisher: Retro Print DOOEL Skopje
- Editor-in-chief: Aleksandar Dimkovski
- Founded: October 29, 1944; 81 years ago
- Language: Macedonian
- Headquarters: ul. Jurij Gagarin br. 15, Skopje
- Country: North Macedonia
- Circulation: 7000 (as of 2019)
- Website: www.novamakedonija.com.mk

Nova Makedonija (Macedonian: Нова Македонија, "New Macedonia") is the oldest daily newspaper in the Republic of North Macedonia. It was established with decision of the presidium of ASNOM and published by NIP Nova Makedonija.

== History ==
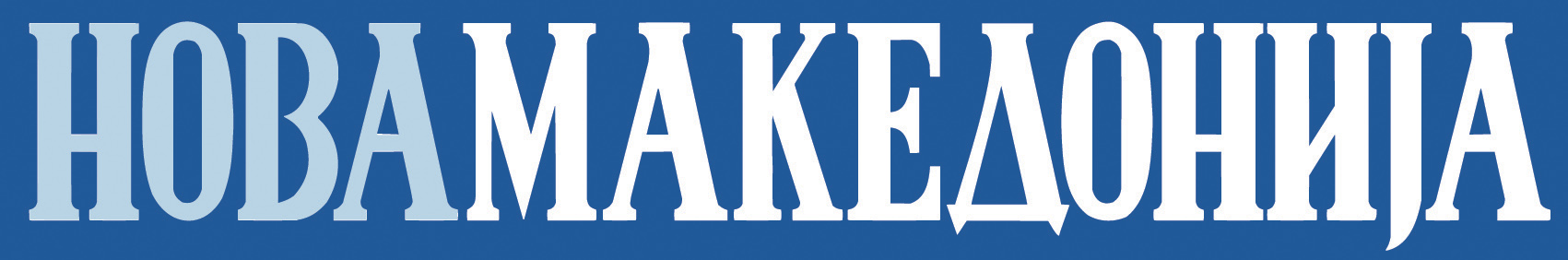
Old logo of the Nova Makedonija

The first edition of Nova Makedonija came out during World War II in Yugoslav Macedonia on 29 October 1944, in Gorno Vranovci, and was written in unstandardized Macedonian language. The newspaper was published by the Agitation and Propaganda Commission at the Central Committee of the Macedonian Communist Party. Vasil Ivanovski was the first editor-in-chief of the newspaper.

The unsuccessful privatisation of Nova Makedonija in 1994-1996 led to the disappearance of all its print outlets from the market, and the later entry of WAZ as the main foreign investor, with a resulting strong concentration in the print media sector (90% in 2003). WAZ withdrew in 2012, selling its publications to local investors.

== Ekran ==
Ekran (Macedonian: Екран) translated means "Screen" was a weekly magazine that was published by "NIP Nova Makedonija" and ceased to exist when the publishing company was closed in 1997. The magazine first started as an attachment to the daily newspaper Nova Makedonija.

== See also ==
- Media of North Macedonia
