= Dimitrovo, Russia =

Dimitrovo (Russian: Димитрово) is the name of several rural localities in Russia:

- Dimitrovo, Jewish Autonomous Oblast, a selo in Birobidzhansky District of the Jewish Autonomous Oblast
- Dimitrovo, Kemerovo Oblast, a settlement in Ulanovskaya Rural Territory of Yaysky District of Kemerovo Oblast
