= Dobromir, Constanța =

Dobromir
- Commune
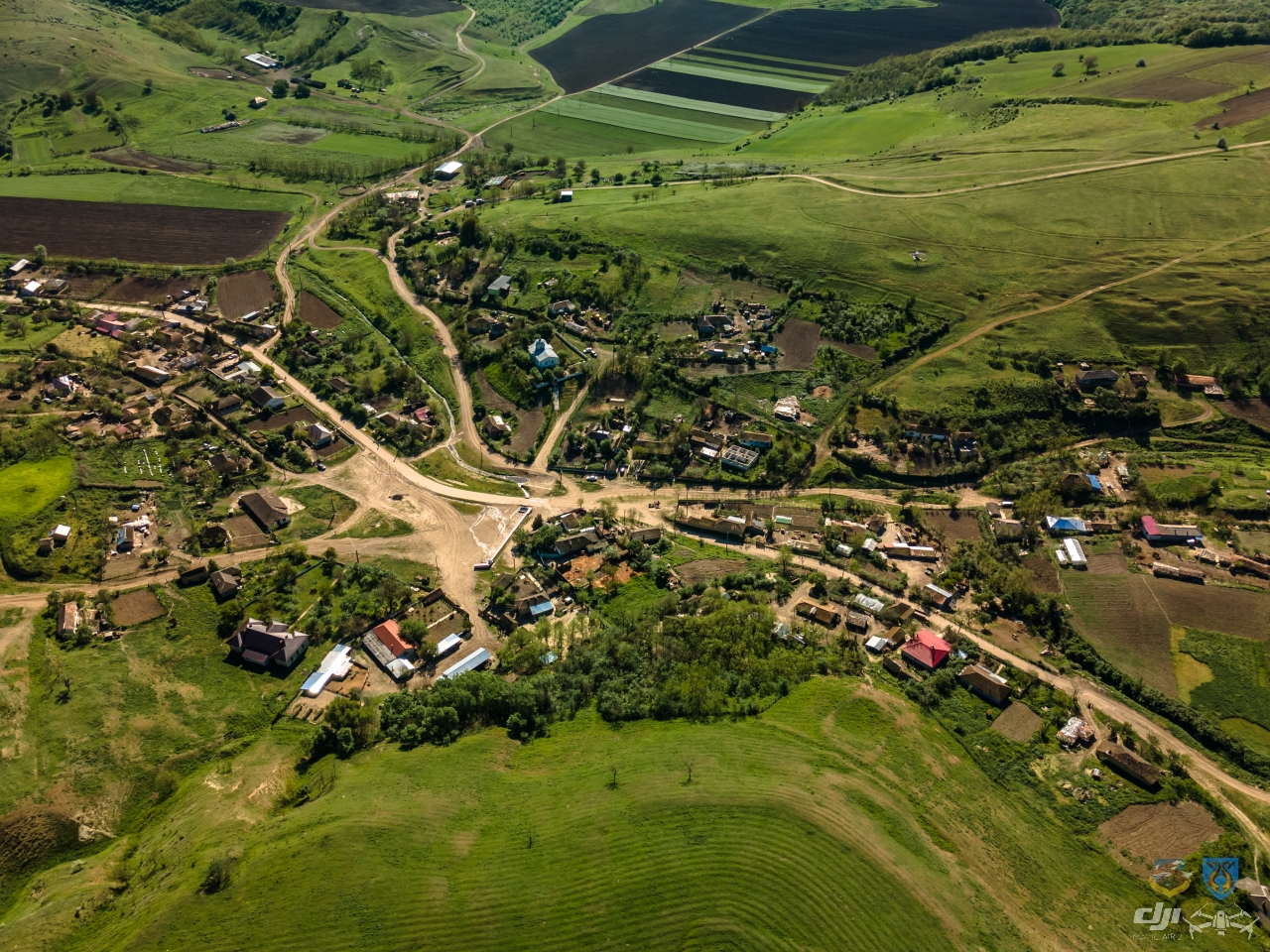
- Aerial view of Cetatea village

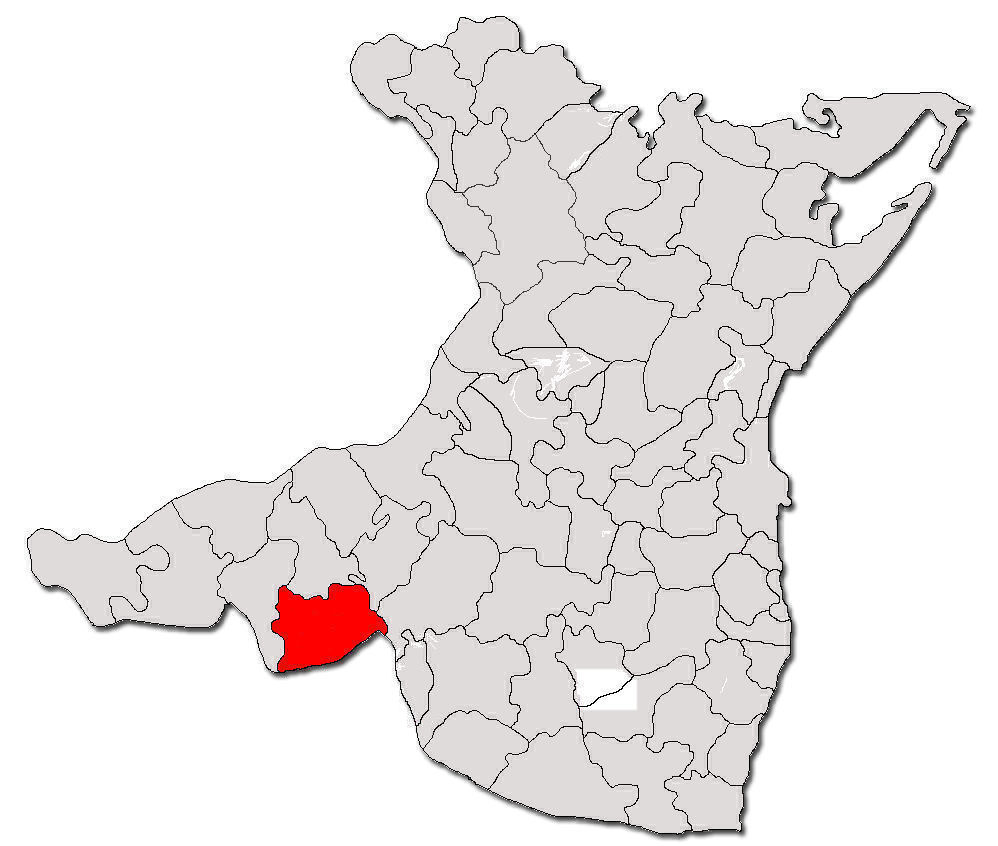
- Location in Constanța County

- Location in Romania
- Coordinates: 44°1′N 27°47′E
- Country: Romania
- County: Constanța
- Subdivisions: Dobromir, Cetatea, Dobromiru din Deal, Lespezi, Pădureni, Văleni

Government
  - Mayor (2020–2024): Visel Iusein (PSD)
- Area: 139.72 km^{2} (53.95 sq mi)
- Elevation: 60 m (200 ft)
- Population (2021-12-01): 3,317
  - Density: 23.74/km^{2} (61.49/sq mi)
- Time zone: UTC+02:00 (EET)
  - Summer (DST): UTC+03:00 (EEST)
- Postal code: 907115
- Area code: +40 x41
- Vehicle reg.: CT
- Website: primariadobromir.ro

Dobromir (Romanian pronunciation: [dobroˈmir]) is a commune in Constanța County, Northern Dobruja, Romania. It includes six villages:

- Dobromir (historical names: Dobromir-Vale, Dobromiru din Vale until 1968)
- Cetatea (historical names: Asârlâc, Turkish: Asırlık)
- Dobromiru din Deal
- Lespezi (historical names: Techechioi, Turkish: Tekeköy)
- Pădureni (historical name: Nastradin until 1968)
- Văleni (historical names: Enisenlia, Enişelia, Eniselia, Valea Rea until 1964, Turkish: Yenişenli)

Since December 2018 Dobromir has been linked with the neighbouring commune of Krushari in Bulgaria via the Krushari–Dobromir border crossing.

== Demographics ==
At the 2002 census, 50.3% of inhabitants were Turks and 49.7% Romanians. 50.3% were Muslim and 49.6% Romanian Orthodox. At the 2011 census, Dobromir had 1,084 Romanians (38.00%), 1,767 Turks (61.93%), 2 others (0.07%). It is the only Romanian commune with a Turkish and Muslim majority.
