= Aleksandria, Dobrich Province =

Aleksandria (village)
- Village
- Location within Bulgaria
- Coordinates: 43°53′12″N 27°45′0″E
- Country: Bulgaria
- Province: Dobrich Province
- Municipality: Krushari
- Time zone: UTC+2 (EET)
  - Summer (DST): UTC+3 (EEST)

Aleksandria (Bulgarian: Александрия [alɛksɐnˈdrijɐ]) is a village in Krushari Municipality, Dobrich Province, northeastern Bulgaria.
