= Zimnitsa, Dobrich Province =

Zimnitsa
- Village
- Location in Bulgaria
- Coordinates: 43°51′55″N 27°37′20″E
- Country: Bulgaria
- Province: Dobrich Province
- Municipality: Krushari
- Time zone: UTC+2 (EET)
  - Summer (DST): UTC+3 (EEST)

Zimnitsa is a village in the municipality of Krushari, in Dobrich Province, in northeastern Bulgaria.
