= Alliance for Social-Liberal Progress =

Political party in Bulgaria

Alliance for Social-Liberal Progress (in Bulgarian: Алианс за социаллиберален прогрес) is a political party in Bulgaria.

== History ==
The party was founded on February 18, 2001, and registered on March 28. The party is led by Vasil Velinov, formerly the president of the Alternative Social-Liberal Party. Other leading figures include Alei Mishkovski, Atanas Direkov and Jurij Aslanov.

The highest organ of the party is the congress. The congress elects a Political Council.

The party backed journalist Petyo Blaskov in his campaign for mayor of Sofia.
