= Dimitrov =

Dimitrov may refer to:

- Dimitrov (surname)
- Dimitrov, Armenia, a town in Armenia
- Dimitrov Cove, a cove in Antarctica
- Dimitrov, Russia, a rural locality (a settlement) in Tambov Oblast, Russia
- Myrnohrad, Ukraine, formerly Dymytrov (Dimitrov), a city in Donetsk Oblast, Ukraine
