= Dimitrov (surname) =

Dimitrov (Bulgarian: Димитров) or female version Dimitrova (Bulgarian: Димитрова) is a Bulgarian surname also popular in the Republic of North Macedonia meaning literally "son of Dimitar" or "Dimitar's", and may refer to:

- Alexander Dimitrov, Bulgarian historian and politician
- Anton Dimitrov, Bulgarian footballer
- Anton Dimitrov, Bulgarian footballer
- Atanas Dimitrov, Bulgarian footballer
- Boyan Dimitrov, Bulgarian mathematician
- Bozhidar Dimitrov, Bulgarian historian
- Detelin Dimitrov, Bulgarian footballer
- Darko Dimitrov, Macedonian composer and music producer
- Emil Dimitrov, Bulgarian singer
- Filip Dimitrov, Bulgarian politician
- Georgi Dimitrov, Bulgarian Communist leader
- G. M. Dimitrov, Bulgarian Agrarian politician
- Georgi Dimitrov Dimitrov, Bulgarian sociologist
- Georgi Dimitrov (1959–2021), Bulgarian footballer
- Grigor Dimitrov (1991–) Bulgarian tennis player
- Ivaylo Dimitrov (1987–) Bulgarian footballer
- Ivaylo Dimitrov (1989–) Bulgarian footballer
- Krasimir Dimitrov, Bulgarian footballer
- Kristian Dimitrov, Bulgarian footballer
- Martin Dimitrov, Bulgarian footballer
- Nikolay Dimitrov (1987–) Bulgarian footballer
- Nikolay Dimitrov (1990–) Bulgarian footballer
- Petar Dimitrov, Bulgarian footballer
- Radoslav Dimitrov, Bulgarian footballer
- Rostislav Dimitrov, Bulgarian triple jumper
- Srđan Dimitrov, Serbian footballer
- Stanke Dimitrov, Bulgarian communist and anti-fascist
- Stefan Dimitrov, Bulgarian footballer
- Svetlin Dimitrov, Bulgarian handballer
- Tsvetan Dimitrov, Bulgarian footballer
- Velizar Dimitrov, Bulgarian footballer
- Vladimir Dimitrov (1882–1960), Bulgarian painter and draughtsman
- Vladimir Dimitrov (1968–), Bulgarian chess grandmaster
- Yancho Dimitrov, Bulgarian combat samboist, kickboxer and mixed martial artist in the heavyweight division.
- Yancho Dimitrov, Bulgarian footballer
