= Bistrets, Dobrich Province =

Bistrets
- Village
- Location in Bulgaria
- Coordinates: 43.833°N 27.729°E
- Country: Bulgaria
- Province: Dobrich Province
- Municipality: Krushari
- Time zone: UTC+2 (EET)
  - Summer (DST): UTC+3 (EEST)

Bistrets is a village in Krushari Municipality, Dobrich Province, northeastern Bulgaria.
