= Ognyanovo, Dobrich Province =

Ognyanovo
- Village
- Location in Bulgaria
- Coordinates: 43.905°N 27.661°E
- Country: Bulgaria
- Province: Dobrich Province
- Municipality: Krushari
- Time zone: UTC+2 (EET)
  - Summer (DST): UTC+3 (EEST)

Ognyanovo is a village in the municipality of Krushari, in Dobrich Province, in northeastern Bulgaria.
