= Mobile IPTV =

Mobile IPTV is a technology that enables users to transmit and receive multimedia traffic including video, audio, text and graphic services through IP-based wired and wireless networks, with support for quality of service, quality of experience, security, mobility, and interactive functions. Through Mobile IPTV, users can view IPTV services using a mobile device.

== Technical approaches ==
=== Mobile TV plus IP ===
This approach uses the traditional digital broadcast networks to deliver IP-based audio, video, graphics and other broadband data services to mobile users. Wide area wireless networks such as cellular networks are integrated to support interactivity. Activities in this approach include Digital Video Broadcast (DVB)-CBMS (Convergence of Broadcasting and Mobile Services) and the WorldDMB. In addition, DVB-IPI (IPI: IP Infrastructure) is an open DVB standard that enables audio/video services to be delivered to and through the mobile device via IP networking. DVB-CBMS is developing bi-directional mobile IP based broadcasting protocol specifications over DVB-H. DVB-CBMS already finished Phase I and currently is working in Phase II. WorldDAB Forum is enhancing and extending Eureka 147 to support IP based services.

Eureka 147 was originally developed for digital radio applications and extended to support video services. Even though this approach is classified as Mobile IPTV technically, the usage of broadcasting networks may incur the loss of individuality of IP.

=== IPTV plus Mobile ===
IPTV services were originally targeted to fixed terminals such as set-top boxes, however, issues on the requirements for mobility support were raised as an out-growth under the auspices of the Fixed-Mobile Convergence (FMC) trend. The outstanding activities are ATIS in the US, Open IPTV Forum, and ITU-T FG IPTV internationally. The development of Mobile IPTV specification is at an early stage. Currently, ITU-T FG IPTV is collecting requirements regarding mobility and wireless characteristics. ATIS has not shown any interest in mobility support yet. In Open IPTV Forum, mobility service entirely based on IMS (IP Multimedia Subsystem) which is a set of specification from 3GPP for delivering IP multimedia to mobile users will be forthcoming.

=== Cellular ===
Open Mobile Alliance (OMA) BCAST is working for IP based mobile broadcasting networks. Its goals are to define an end-to-end framework for mobile broadcast and compile the set of necessary enablers. Its features are bearer agnostic, which means any Broadcast Distribution Network can be adopted as its transport means. OMA BCAST, however, is only applicable to mobile terminals up to now and showing interest in expanding its specification to cover fixed terminals in Phase II.

=== Internet ===
Internet video services are usually termed as Internet TV or Web TV. This approach is open for anybody to be a content provider, a service provider, or a consumer. Quality of service is not guaranteed since it is based on a best-effort service model.

== Technical obstacles ==
Mobile IPTV has at least one wireless interface per device. A minimum of 2–3 Mbit/s of bandwidth needs to be provided, due to the characteristics of the IPTV service, and until 4G wireless network services are widely deployed, wireless link bandwidth is usually not yet broad enough to accommodate high-definition and ultra-high-definition television quality video services.

Since Mobile IPTV assumes at least one wireless link between the source (e.g. a streaming media server) and the destination (e.g. a mobile terminal), there are technical obstacles related to the usage of the wireless link.

Most mobile terminals have small displays, low power processors, and limited storage, compared to desktop PCs.

Even if mobile terminals are stationary, obstacles around the mobile terminals can affect the received signal and cause packet loss. Packets delivered through the wireless link are exposed to a variety of signal degradation such as shadowing, fast/slow fading, etc.

Because it is currently not possible to deploy wireless networks to cover all geographical areas with no "dead spots", services are restricted in some areas. However, by adopting vertical handovers (hand-overs between different networks), the coverage issue can be mitigated.

The characteristics of the wireless link can vary due to a variety of causes, and the rate of change can be very abrupt. For example, vertical handover can quickly change the path between the source and sink, bandwidth, physical MAC address, IP address. Therefore, some solutions devised for the relatively static wired computer network environment may not work properly.

== Middleware ==
By deploying middleware, a service provider can control the usage of IPTV services remotely. Also, middleware acts as a transparent way to adapt IPTV services to different platforms. So far, there are several well-known middleware applications for set-top boxes, but which are too large to be implemented on a mobile device.
