= Macedonian Information Centre =

Independent News Agency in North Macedonia

Macedonian Information Centre Македонски информативен центар
- Company type: Private
- Industry: News agency
- Founded: 1992
- Headquarters: Skopje, North Macedonia
- Key people: Dragan Antonov (manager)
- Website: www.micnews.com.mk

Macedonian Information Centre (MIC; Macedonian: Македонски информативен центар МИЦ, Makedonski informativen centar) is an independent news agency in the Republic of North Macedonia. MIC's primary task is providing news, information and analyses to the international community, mainly to foreign governments, foreign embassies, governmental organizations, institutes, international businesses, libraries, various research organizations, news agencies and media abroad about Macedonian politics, economy, society, religion, culture, etc.
