= NIP Nova Makedonija =

Yugoslavian/Macedonian publishing company (1944-2012)

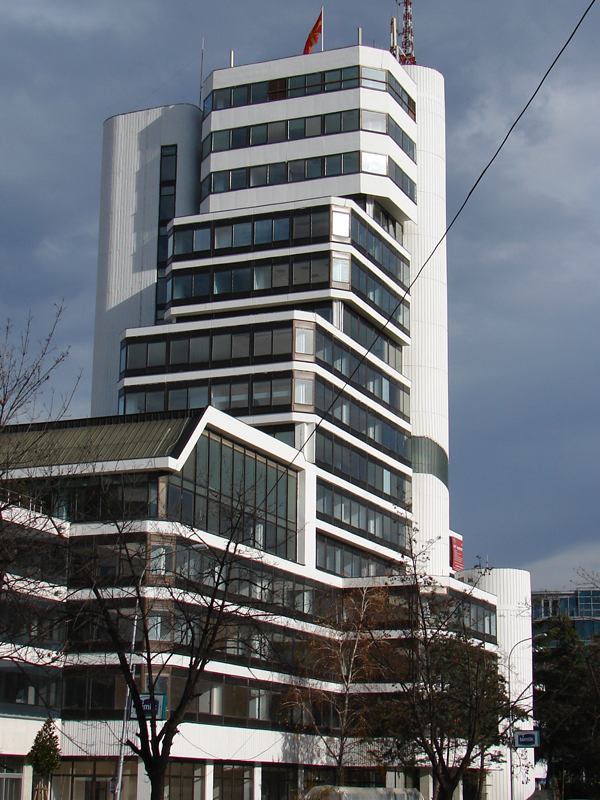
- Former building of the Nova Makedonija
- Founded: 1944
- Founder: ASNOM
- Defunct: 2012
- Country of origin: SFRY
- Headquarters location: Skopje
- Imprints: Nova Makedonija, Vecer, Puls, Ekran, Kotelec, Flaka, Birlik, Detska Radost, Rosica, Drugarche, Nash Svet, Radio NO-MA

NIP Nova Makedonija was a publishing and media company located in Yugoslavia, and later in Macedonia, present-day North Macedonia. It was established in 1944 and ceased to exist in 2012.
