= Blizoo =

Telecommunications company

blizoo
- Native name: Близу
- Company type: Joint Stock Company
- Industry: telecommunications
- Founded: 17 May 2010
- Defunct: 12 April 2017
- Headquarters: Sofia, Bulgaria
- Products: Cable television; Telephony; Internet services
- Revenue: €47 million (2014)
- Website: www.blizoo.bg; www.blizoo.mk

Blizoo was a Bulgarian telecommunications operator in Macedonia and Bulgaria. In Bulgaria it was formed by merging two of the biggest television operators in the country — Eurocom Cable and CableTel, in 2010. It was acquired by Mtel on 29 July 2015. The two operators merged their TV offerings on 1 June 2016, and then merged completely on 12 April 2017. In Macedonia Blizoo acquired CableTel on 11 November 2011 and later merged to one.VIP operator on 11 May 2016.

== Services ==
- Analog television
- Broadband Internet
- DVB-C
- Fixed line telephony

== History ==
It was founded in 1992 as "Unicoms Trading" in Sofia, and after 1995, in Pleven, Lom and Oryahovo.

In 1999, it built an optic-coaxial network in Sofia providing fast access to Internet using DOCSIS protocol.

In 2001 it was rebranded as Eurocom Cable which unifies all subsidiaries part of "Eurocom" from Sofia and the country. Activity is the delivery of cable TV, high speed Internet and conventional Internet.

In 2002 the SEEF fund invests more than 10 million dollars.

In 2005 it was bought by the Dutch company "FN Cable Holdings B.V." from the group Warburg Pincus (1 of the 3 funds, participated in the bought of Vivacom, then BTC (Bulgarian Telecommunications Company)).

In 2006 "Eurocom" begins to operate its own build metro-coaxial-optical network in Bulgaria, it also begins to offer LAN Internet through its subsidiary "InterBGCom".

In 2007 "Eurocom" announced triple service (triple play) - transferring voice (Phone), video (Television) and data (Internet), which is still in use today.

In 2009 the Swedish investment fund EQT V acquires for 120 million EUR "Eurocom Cable" completely, and 70% from the then opponent "CableTel". Additional 90 million EUR were invested.

On 17 May 2010 the two companies are officially merged into one under the "blizoo" brand, phasing out the longstanding "Eurocom" and "CableTel" brands.. After the merging, "blizoo" is officially the largest telecommunication operator in Bulgaria. Later that year, "blizoo" buys the Montana's cable operator (Mont7) and Dobrich's internet provider, "Link BG".

On July 29, 2015, mobile operator Mobiltel agreed to acquire "blizoo", after previously acquiring rival companies Megalan Network and Spectrum Net. The Bulgarian "Commission for Protection of Competition" (CPC) approved the deal and the merger of the two companies in late 2015.

On 1 June 2016 the two operators finally merged their TV and internet offerings into one single. "blizoo" still operates separately the customers that have still unexpired contracts with it.

On 12 April 2017 "blizoo" was finally flooded intro Mobiltel, with the latter taking officially care of the contracts and services of its customers.
