= Council of Europe Convention on Access to Official Documents =

Binding legal agreement in Norway

The Council of Europe Convention on Access to Official Documents, usually known as the Tromsø Convention, was signed on 18 June 2009 in the Norwegian city of Tromsø. It entered into force on 1 December 2020 after it had been ratified by the Verkhovna Rada of Ukraine on 20 May 2020. As of January 2025, 17 states have ratified the Convention (Albania, Armenia, Bosnia and Herzegovina, Croatia, Estonia, Finland, Hungary, Iceland, Latvia, Lithuania, Moldova, Montenegro, North Macedonia, Norway, Spain, Sweden and Ukraine) and 4 additional states have signed it.

The Tromsø Convention is the first binding international legal instrument to recognize a general right of access to official documents held by public authorities. It is a multilateral agreement through which the opportunities for citizens to access public information are increased. It lays down a right of access to official documents. Limitations on this right are only permitted in order to protect certain interests like national security, defense or privacy.

== See also ==
- Freedom of information legislation
