= Dimitrovo, Jewish Autonomous Oblast =

Dimitrovo Димитрово
- Selo
- Location within Jewish Autonomous Oblast Location within Russia
- Coordinates: 48°23′N 132°34′E
- Country: Russia
- Region: Jewish Autonomous Oblast
- District: Birobidzhansky District
- Time zone: UTC+10:00

Dimitrovo (Russian: Димитрово) is a rural locality (a selo) in Birobidzhansky District, Jewish Autonomous Oblast, Russia. Population: 16 (2010 census); 31 (2002 census); There are 2 streets in this selo.

== Geography ==
This rural locality is located 51 km from Birobidzhan (the district's administrative centre and capital of Jewish Autonomous Oblast) and 7,059 km from Moscow. Opytnoye Pole is the nearest rural locality.
