= Centre for Law and Democracy =

Canadian non-profit organisation

- Nickname: CLD
- Formation: 2010
- Founder: Toby Mendel, Executive Director
- Type: Not-for-profit organization
- Headquarters: Halifax, Nova Scotia
- Website: www.law-democracy.org

The Centre for Law and Democracy (CLD) is a non-profit organisation based in Halifax, Nova Scotia, Canada. The CLD works worldwide to promote, protect, and develop those human rights that underpin democracy, including the right to information (RTI), freedom of expression, freedom of the press, freedom of association, and freedom of assembly. The CLD regularly drafts and consults on legislation, conducts field research, publishes assessments and guidelines, assists with litigation, and provides training.

The CLD is a not-for-profit organization funded primarily by governments and international institutions. The bulk of the CLD's work is done in collaboration with one or more local organizations and peer global institutions. Past collaborators include Columbia Global Freedom of Expression, the International Federation of Journalists, UNESCO, International Media Support, Eurasian Digital Media Foundation, the Judicial Institute of Jordan, Red de Transparencia, Espacios Abiertos, Transparency International, Transparency Maroc, The Institute for Research, Advocacy, and Development, the Palestinian Center for Development and Media Freedoms, the Maharat Foundation, Deutsche Gesellschaft für Internationale Zusammenarbeit, the FOJO Media Institute, Media Defence, the Myanmar Media Lawyers Network, the Arabic Network for Human Rights Information, the Centre for Internet and Society, the Centro de Estudios en Libertad de Expresión y Acceso a la Información, OpenNet Korea, the Canadian Internet Policy & Public Interest Clinic, the Nepal International Media Partnership.

An example of CLD projects is its ongoing work in Myanmar. Prior to 2021, the CLD supported the country's democratic transition, including by fostering the development of a robust and independent media sector and drafting new laws governing broadcasting, digital speech and the press. When the military Junta conducted a coup in January 2021, the CLD pivoted, analyzing executive orders crushing media independence, access to information, freedom of expression and human rights more broadly.

The CLD regularly makes submissions to the United Nations, including to the UN Special Rapporteur on Freedom of Expression and the UN Office of the High Commissioner for Human Rights, on contemporary global issues. These submissions are substantive documents, drawing on the CLD's past and ongoing work. Past examples of submissions to the UN Special Rapporteur on Freedom of Expression consider disinformation (2020) and freedom of expression in armed conflicts (2022), and a 2021 submission to the UN Office of the High Commissioner for Human Rights considered the right to information.

== Examples of CLD's Projects ==
=== Assessing the Right to Information ===
CLD is best known for publishing the Global Right to Information Rating, a comparative analysis of right to information laws around the world, which it developed in collaboration with Access Info Europe, along with a network of global transparency experts. The rating provides a reliable tool for advocates, critics, legislators and journalists to measure their country's right to information laws against their neighbours, and against international standards. Its rankings have been cited widely in international media.

The RTI Rating assesses legislation based on 61 indicators of a strong right to information law, and is divided into seven categories: Right of Access, Scope, Requesting Procedures, Exceptions and Refusals, Appeals, Sanctions and Protection and Promotional Measures.

CLD has also developed a separate methodology for assessing the implementation and performance of the right to information in practice (the Right to Information Implementation Assessment: Comprehensive Methodology).

=== Trainings on International Human Rights Law ===
One CLD area of focus is the provision of trainings on international standards on freedom of expression and the right to information. Examples include the development, in partnership with UNESCO, of the Massive Open Online Course (MOOC) on Access to Information Laws and Policies and their Implementation, an online course launched in 2022 and the Training Manual for Judges on International Standards on Freedom of Opinion and Expression, a guide to international standards on freedom of expression published in 2022 in collaboration with International Media Support, UNESCO and the Judicial Institute of Jordan. CLD also prepared, in partnership with the Inter-Parliamentary Union and UNESCO a Massive Open Online Course on Freedom of Expression for Parliaments and their Members.

=== Litigation ===
CLD reports that it has been involved in litigation in different capacities, including as an amicus curiae before Constitutional Court of Colombia in a case concerning net neutrality and as the representative of a petitioner in a complaint to the UN Human Rights Committee concerning the German state of Bavaria's absence of a right to information law. CLD's Executive Director, Toby Mendel, has also appeared as an expert witness on international standards relating to defamation before the Inter-American Court of Human Rights in the case of Palacio Urrutia and Others v. Ecuador.

=== Media Lawyers' Networks ===
CLD, supported by the Global Media Defence Fund managed by UNESCO, has supported the development of networks of media lawyers in various countries with a goal of bringing together legal professionals with an interest in protecting media freedom and freedom of expression and fostering professional development and collaboration. CLD has offered technical support to the development of these networks, including through providing model training materials on freedom of expression.

=== Myanmar's Democratic Transition ===
CLD was prominently engaged in supporting Myanmar's democratic transition, including by helping to found the Myanmar Media Lawyers' Network, and through direct engagement with the government, political parties and civil society to promote understanding of human rights. In 2015, CLD, alongside David Kaye, the UN Special Rapporteur on the promotion and protection of the right to freedom of opinion and expression, and Myanmar's Information Minister U Ye Htut, appeared at the International Press Institute's 2015 World Congress and General Assembly to advise on the importance of expanding free expression rights in the country.

=== Newfoundland and Labrador's Legislative Reform ===
CLD has been prominently involved in processes to improve right to information recommendations on improving Newfoundland and Labrador's right to information legislation. This began in 2012 with the controversial adoption of Bill 29, an act which substantially weakened transparency in the province. CLD was highly critical of the moves, which led then-Attorney General Felix Collins to refer to them as a "cheap, amateurish" "two-bit outfit" on the floor of the House of Assembly. In response, CLD noted that they had worked in many difficult environments, including Kazakhstan, Myanmar and Somalia, but that this was the first time their integrity and professionalism had been attacked by a political leader. Two years later, the government of Newfoundland and Labrador backed down from the Bill 29 changes and initiated a review process, in which CLD was a prominent participant, and which resulted in strong improvements to the provincial right to information legislation.

=== Human Rights in Indonesia ===
CLD has been actively involved in advocating for the strengthening of right to information laws in Indonesia. CLD's work here has included intervening as an amicus curiae at the Indonesian Constitutional Court, and publishing a report detailing barriers to implementation of Indonesia's access to information legislation cited by the University College of London's Constitution Unit.

CLD also participated in an International Partnership Mission to Indonesia with the aim of protecting media institutions by strengthening press freedoms and freedom of expression legislation. Following consultations with high-level government stakeholders, civil society, and the media, the mission ultimately identified several important areas for improvement including impunity for violent acts committed against journalists, monopolist ownership of media outlets, harsh criminal sanctions for certain types of online speech, and restrictions on physical access to certain sensitive regions of the country.
