= Večer (North Macedonia) =

Daily newspaper in North Macedonia

Вечер Vecher
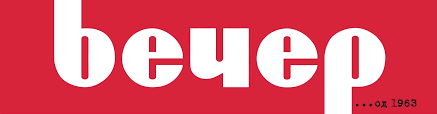
- Type: Daily newspaper
- Owner(s): Vecher Pres DOOEL
- Editor: Boban Bogdanovski - Andreski
- Headquarters: Mito Hadzivasilev - Jasmin; Skopje, North Macedonia
- Website: vecer.press

Večer (Macedonian: Вечер, lit. 'Evening') is a daily newspaper in North Macedonia. The first issue of Večer was published on 11 November 1963 by NIP Nova Makedonija. Its current managing editor is Vesna Mikik Bozinovska and deputy manager is Elizabeta Arsoska. It is published every day, except Sunday.
