= International Day for Universal Access to Information =

United Nations observance

Access To Information Day
- Flag of United Nations
- Official name: International Day for Universal Access to Information
- Observed by: UN
- Celebrations: UN
- Begins: 2015
- Date: 28 September
- Next time: 28 September 2026
- Frequency: annual

The International Day for Universal Access to Information (IDUAI) was proclaimed on 15 October 2019 at the 74th UN General Assembly to be held on 28 September.

Initially the day (commonly called the Access to Information Day) was designated by the UNESCO General Conference. It was inaugurated in November 2015 and was first held on 28 September 2016.

The day had been recognised as International Right to Know Day since 2002 and was developed by international civil society advocates beginning in 2012. The UNESCO resolution creating the day was pushed by African civil society groups seeking greater information transparency.

Currently only 17 African Union member states have adopted national right to information laws, and groups like Open Government Partnership hope that the recognition of the right to information will "provide an important platform for all stakeholders at national level to discuss the adoption and effective implementation of national right to information laws in line with continental and international standards and obligations."

However, African civil society groups like MISA Zimbabwe have noted that states like Zimbabwe which do have Right to Information laws still have a long way to go to ensure they improve governance. In 2016, MISA Zimbabwe used Access to Information Day to criticise Zimbabwe's poor information transparency provisions, noting that, "While Zimbabwe was one of the first African countries to adopt an access to information law in the form of the Access to Information and Protection of Privacy Act (AIPPA), the law in question is a far cry from its purported import and impact."

== See also ==
- Right to know
