= Alexander Dimitrov =

Bulgarian business executive

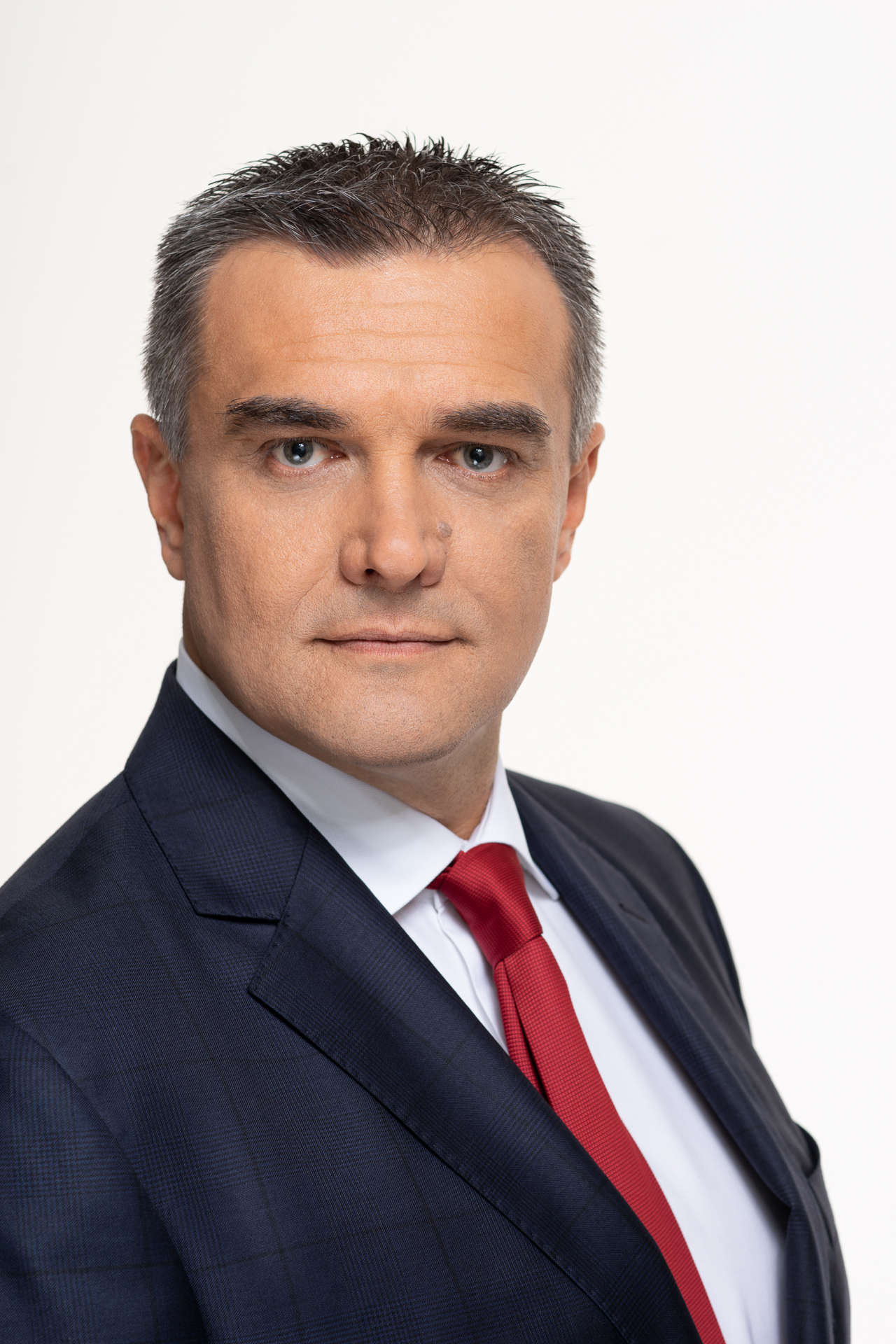
- Born: 20 April 1973 (age 53); Sofia, Bulgaria
- Education: Technical University, Sofia; University of National and World Economy
- Years active: 2001–present
- Known for: CEO of A1 Bulgaria

Alexander Dimitrov (Bulgarian: Александър Димитров) was born in 1973 in Sofia.

== Life and career ==
He holds a master's degree in Electrical Machinery from the Technical University - Sofia and a master's degree in Marketing and Management from the University of National and World Economy in Sofia.

Alexander Dimitrov started his career in the cosmetic industry taking various leadership positions in Sarantis Bulgaria (1996 – 1999), Sarantis Czech Republic (1999 – 2000), and Intercosmetics (2000 – 2001).

Alexander Dimitrov is chief executive officer of A1 Bulgaria, formerly known as Mtel, before its rebranding in 2018. He has over 15 years of experience in the telecommunication industry.

Alexander Dimitrov joined Mtel’s team from Vivacom, another Bulgarian telecom, where he was chief commercial officer since 2008. Previously, from 2001 till 2006, he was Commercial Director of Germanos Telecom Bulgaria, a mobile products and services dealers’ chain, and from 2006 till 2008 – a chief executive officer of the company.

He was named Manager of the Year 2018 in the most prestigious competition for leadership achievements in the Bulgaria. The award was given to him by the President of the Republic of Bulgaria Rumen Radev, after months-long process of evaluation and selection of candidates carried out by Deloitte Bulgaria. Alexander Dimitrov took with him two other prizes - the “Viewers’ choice” award by bTV, which was decided by a poll on the media's website and the special “Mission in favor of the society” award, which was given by the “24 Chasa” daily.

Alexander Dimitrov is also a member of the Confederation of Employers and Industrialists in Bulgaria's management board as of March 2017.

== See also ==
- A1 Bulgaria
