= Krushari =

Krushari Крушари
- Location of Krushari
- Coordinates: 43°49′N 27°45′E
- Country: Bulgaria
- Province (Oblast): Dobrich

Government
  - Mayor: Dobri Stefanov
- Elevation: 208 m (682 ft)

Population (2009)
  - Total: 1,592
- Time zone: UTC+2 (EET)
  - Summer (DST): UTC+3 (EEST)
- Postal Code: 9410
- Area code: 05771

Krushari (Bulgarian: Крушари, pronounced [kruˈʃari]) is a village in northeastern Bulgaria, part of Dobrich Province. It is the administrative centre of Krushari Municipality, which lies in the northwestern part of the province. Krushari is located 32 kilometres from the provincial capital of Dobrich, 85 kilometres (53 mi) from Varna and around 70 kilometres (43 mi) from Balchik and Silistra.

The old name of the village was Armutlii (also Armutli, Armutlu, Armutlia), which has an Ottoman Turkish etymology and shares the same meaning as the current Bulgarian name: "pear growers" or "pear vendors". The modern name was introduced in 1942, after Southern Dobruja was returned to Bulgaria following a Romanian rule between the 1913 Treaty of Bucharest and the 1940 Treaty of Craiova.

Since December 2018 Krushari has been linked with the neighbouring commune of Dobromir in Romania via the Krushari–Dobromir border crossing.
