= Transparency of media ownership in Bulgaria =

Transparency of media ownership refers to the public availability of accurate, comprehensive and up-to-date information about media ownership structures to make possible for media authorities and the wider public to ascertain who effectively owns and controls the media. According to the expert Nelly Ognyanova, lack of transparency in media ownership is one of the major problem in the media system in Bulgaria. In Bulgaria there are specific provisions concerning print, electronic media and broadcast media. The relevant law, in particular the Law on Radio and Television and the Law on Mandatory Deposition of Press and Other Works, requires the submission of data identifying the actual owners of electronic and print media and online registers are available to the public. Also, a law imposing restrictions on offshore companies to acquire shares and assets in different fields including the media sector, entered into force in 2014. In addition, under Bulgarian law, media are obliged to provide information about ownership upon request in conformity with the provisions set forth in the Law on Access to Public Information. Despite the existence of these legal transparency obligations, there are several problems concerning, on one side the application of the rules, on the other, the requirements themselves, which are not enough effective in ensuring the disclosure of the actual owners. Also, legal requirements are constantly circumvented and sanctions usually not applied. Moreover, according to experts, the law should not be limited to obligations concerning the ownership, but expand its scope to examine the origin of funding of media outlets as well. Overall, despite recent legislative changes, some loopholes remain, allowing non-transparency in media ownership and funding and making it possible to circumvent the law and conceal who the true owners of the media are. According to expert Ognyanova, there are several ways of circumventing the legal requirements: one example is the case of Krasikir Gergov, a former agent of the Communist-era State Security services and owner of advertising agencies that, while acting in the guise of a “consultant”, actually had a share of the ownership and a contract allowing him to exercise control over the newsroom of a media outlet in Bulgaria. According to Professor Georgi Lozanov, a former member of the Council for Electronic Media, the introduction of the Access to Information Law could help in making more transparent the media sector, in particular media ownership and sources of funds which are largely opaque in Bulgaria. "There is no transparency of media capital whatsoever and one never knows what the real situation is [...]. The introduction of the Access to Information Act [...] represented an attempt at bringing the media to supply information about the sources and funds. Because, if you set up a media outlet and sell a product which is directly related to freedom of speech, it is normal to be able to track the business from the very beginning, thai is, to track the genealogy of the message in the business sense", remarked Professor Lozanov.

== Media-specific disclosure requirements for print media ==
In Bulgaria media organisations are required to report ownership information to a media authority under the Mandatory Deposition of Print and Other Materials Act (MDPOMA), in force since January 2001 and amended in 2010. The law covers only the print media and provides that information on ownership should be reported to the Ministry of Culture which has the responsibility to collect and publish online data on ownership submitted by print media. The law does not require the disclosure of the size of shareholding but includes the disclosure of the names of people holding shares on behalf of another (beneficial ownership) through brokerage and provides a definition of "ultimate owner"

Also, under the MDPOMA law, newspapers and magazines are obliged to disclose their ownership data directly to the public through the publication of this information on the first issue of each newspaper each calendar year and every time there is a change in ownership or control of the media organisation.

Overall, existing obligations under MDPOMA does not, on its own, allow to know the legal or natural persons who effectively own and ultimately control the media operating in Bulgaria because the size of shareholding is not made public. This information can only be obtained by cross-referencing the data provided under MDPOMA with those available in the Company Register, a public register containing ownership information on all the registered companies in the country.

Another weakness in the transparency system of print media concerns the lack of guarantees for disclosing equity that secure media financially and by which ownership is acquired. Besides criticism regarding legal provisions themselves, the implementation is another matter. Indeed, a further critical point concerns the effectiveness of the disclosure regime, with particular regard with the functioning of the sanctions system required by the law. As a matter of fact, according to public records consulted by Access-Info Europe, in the past few years there have not been cases of sanctions applied despite the fact that there have been evidence of cases of non-disclosure. This situation led to an article in the magazine Capital Weekly in January 2012 that revealed that many authorities in Bulgaria are not familiar with their obligations under the law. A study conducted in 2014 shows that a series of important ownership changes in the Bulgarian media system that occurred in that year had not been recorded as it should have been done. There are also journalistic investigations corroborating the fact that publishers of print media fail to comply with their duty to submit the required data and no fine have been imposed to sanction this.

== Media-specific disclosure requirements for broadcast media ==
The broadcast media are covered by the Radio and Television Act (RTA), adopted in 2008 and amended in 2010 and 2012. The law provides that broadcast media should present ownership data to the Electronic Media Council which has the responsibility to maintain public registers containing, among others, the data on ownership collected by the council. In particular, the law provides the disclosure of data on natural or legal persons exerting control over the management structure of the media concerned. The law defines "control over the media services provider" when a person controls, also by means of connected persons, more than 50% of the voters, or could directly or indirectly appoint more than 50% of the managing body of the media services provider, or could exert a significant influence on the decision-making process. Also, according to the RTA, interests held by owners (for instance, as shareholder or partner) in other media organisations have to be made public. Ownership information collected in the Register can be accessed online.

The major weak point of the disclosure regime for broadcast media concerns the fact that the obligation to make public the size of beneficial owners through brokerage is non-existent, even if, at the moment, brokerage is not a common practice in ownership media patterns in Bulgaria.

== Non Media-Specific Transparency Requirements ==
The law regulates the disclosure of ownership information for media organisations regularly registered as companies is the Company Register Act adopted in 2006 and in force since January 2008. As not all media are registered companies, as a matter of fact this law does not cover all media outlets operating in Bulgaria. For the media companies covered by the scope of this law, information have to be made to the Company Register, which is a public register. Information to be disclosed under this law includes: names of directors, names of shareholders (comprising beneficial shareholders through brokerage), members of management and supervisory boards, size of shareholdings, management details, the outcome of the company decision-making process, financial reports, constitutive acts, etc. Information on those with indirect control is also made public. This information is recorded electronically and available to the public online via the company register website maintained by the Registry Agency. Even if not all media operating in Bulgaria are covered by the scope of this provisions, overall, the information to be disclosed in the Company Register is quite comprehensive and is usually sufficient to ascertain the owners of the media registered as companies.

== Transparency requirements regarding Access to Public Information ==
The Bulgarian law on Access to Public Information sets forth some general requirements concerning transparency regarding management and ownership of the media. According to the law, citizens and legal persons are entitled to access information regarding:

- persons taking part in the management of exercise effective control over the management or operations;
- economically associated persons who take part in the management of other mass media and that exercise control in the media;
- information about the financial results of the media owner.

== See also ==
- Transparency of media ownership in Europe
- Media of Bulgaria
- Transparency of media ownership in Croatia
- Transparency of media ownership in Greece
- Transparency of media ownership in Romania
- Transparency of media ownership in Serbia
- Media freedom in the European Union
- Concentration of media ownership
- Media transparency
