= Transparency of media ownership in Romania =

Transparency of media ownership refers to the public availability of accurate, comprehensive and up-to-date information about media ownership structures, to make it possible for media authorities and the wider public to ascertain who effectively owns and controls the media. In Romania, transparency of media ownership is addressed directly in the Constitution and is regulated by a media-specific law, namely the Audiovisual Law no. 504, and by national company law. As for constitutional provisions, even if Romania is among the few European countries that addresses the issue of media transparency directly in the Constitution, the focus is on transparency of financial sources and not on ownership. Nonetheless, despite the constitutional provisions on the right to impose an obligation on the media to make public their sources of finance, the Parliament has never enacted the applicable legislation. The Romanian media-specific law requiring the disclosure of media ownership information applies only to the broadcast sector and provides the disclosure to both a public authority, namely the National Audiovisual Council (CNA) and directly to the public. Finally, the national company law contains provisions regulating transparency of media ownership. It applies to all media which are registered companies and foresees the obligation to publish all the most relevant information on companies' ownership in the Trade Register Company. Overall, even though the Romanian legislation in the field of media ownership transparency is fully aligned with the European standards, in practice sufficient information to assess who effectively owns and ultimately controls the media is not always available.

== Legal framework ==
=== Media-specific law: disclosure to a public authority ===
Romanian law on media ownership transparency only covers the broadcast sector and has no similar provision for print media, but, in practice, many Romanian newspapers make public their publishers and owners. The situation is more complicated for online media and blogs where anonymity is very common.

The relevant law, named Audiovisual Law no. 504, requires the disclosure of all the information necessary to identify the owners of media companies, e.g. name and contact details of the media organization; name and contact detail of owners; country of domicile of company with an interest; citizenship / residence status of individual with an interest beyond a given threshold. However, the disclosure requirement does not apply to beneficial ownership, which refers to shares of a media company hold on behalf of another person. According to the law, the information must be reported to the National Audiovisual Council, a public regulatory authority under the control of the Parliament. The CNA is the guarantor of the public interest in the audiovisual field.

One of the main problem of the law concerns indirect interest: threshold for disclosing indirect interest, which is 20%, looks too high to provide proper information for assessing media ownership and guaranteeing transparency. Furthermore, getting information on individuals or companies with indirect control or significant interests in a given media company is quite time-consuming and complex as it requires in practice a step-by-step process of checking and cross-referencing of a large number of different records.

With regard to constraints or costs for public access to the information held by the National Audiovisual Council there are not particularly high costs or time-consuming procedures, even if, in general terms, accessing information held by public institutions often entails several barriers, such as the reluctance of public officials to reveal sensitive information and their resort to broad interpretations of the exceptions to public disclosure of information.

Overall, the legal framework provides the disclosure of nearly all the information needed to identify ownership of the broadcast media in Romania. However, the threshold for reporting indirect interest (20%), the difficulties in obtaining information on entities or persons with indirect control and significant interest, abuses and poor implementation, the lack of co-operation between the CNA and other authorities leave room to abuses and insufficient disclosure.

=== Media-specific law: disclosure directly to the public ===
According to Article. 48 of Law 504 of 2002, media companies from the audiovisual field must also disclose the information on media ownership directly to the public through their websites. The requirement applies to all kind of information to be disclosed in accordance with the law. In particular, financial information must be updated and disclosed on an annual basis, while the other information must be always available to the public (requirement of the “permanent access” by the public, according to Article 48).

=== Non-media specific transparency requirements: company law ===
In addition to the Audiovisual Law, another source of regulation for transparency of media ownership in Romania is company law which contains non-media specific transparency requirements. The relevant law, which is the Law 31 / 1990 on Trading Companies is applicable to all registered media company owning a license and forbids owners' anonymity: companies are therefore obliged to publish all the main information on ownership in the Trade Register Office (TRO) and to communicate changes. All the constitutive deeds and the modifications are registered in the Trade Registry and published in the Official Journal. The specific information to be disclosed depends on the legal type of the company and might be different for each type of business organizations. However, the mandatory information for all companies are: names, the date and the place of birth, the address and the citizenship of the partners / shareholders (in case of natural persons); the name, the headquarter address and the nationality of the associates (in case of legal persons); the type, name, headquarters address and the company logo; the company's field of activity; the registered capital, including the contribution of each partner in cash or in kind; the number and the face value of the shares and the number of shares given to each partners; the managers of the company and their rights; the share given to each associate in case of profit and loss; secondary headquarters.

The public can directly access this data by requesting information from the Trade Registry. Also, since the constitutive documents are also published in the Official Journal, the public can consult this information through the institutional website of the Journal.

Even if the law requires the disclosure of all necessary information on ownership, in fact this data have to be reported to various agencies. This might imply, for instance, a complicated step-by-step check process involving request for information from different agencies for each company in the cases of chains of ownership, such as companies owning other companies and the like. Moreover, as there are minimal financial sanctions for failure to report in time, in practice few companies comply with the obligation to update ownership information.

According to some critics, the Trade Register Office shows insufficient information since the real owner of the media and who effectively controls them remain hidden. In addition, although public, the access to information collected in the Register is not free of charge and can even be prohibitive. Despite these limits, the TRO remains the main source of data on media ownership in Romania and even if the learning process might be time-consuming, especially in the most complex cases of unclear ownership, all in all it is feasible given sufficient time and resources to collect all the needed information, including beneficial ownership.

== Transparency of media ownership in practice ==
Despite the fact that Romanian legislation in the field of media ownership transparency is formally aligned with the European standards (both the European Commission and the Council of Europe standards are incorporated in the national legal framework), in practice, there are some major problems. Among the main shortcomings there is the absence of the requirement to disclose all the necessary data to establish which are the owners in case of indirect control or having significant interests in the media company. Moreover, at the practical level, the implementation of the law leaves room for abuses and inadequate disclosure. In sum, a set of factors, including the difficulty in ascertain indirect control and significant interest, implementation problems as well as the challenges in accessing public information result in a significant difficulty for the general public in accessing all the key information to establish who effectively owns and ultimately controls a media outlet.

== See also ==
- Transparency of media ownership in Europe
- Media of Romania
- Transparency of media ownership in Croatia
- Transparency of media ownership in Bulgaria
- Media freedom in the European Union
- Concentration of media ownership
- Media transparency
