= Mass media in Bulgaria =

Television, magazines, and newspapers in Bulgaria are all operated by both state-owned and for-profit corporations which depend on advertising, subscription, and other sales-related revenues. The Constitution of Bulgaria guarantees freedom of speech. As a country in transition, Bulgaria's media system is under transformation.

Bulgaria's mass media are generally deemed unbiased, although the state still dominates the field through the Bulgarian National Television (BNT), the Bulgarian National Radio (BNR), and the Bulgarian Telegraph Agency. Bulgarian media have a record of unbiased reporting, although they are deemed potentially at risk of political influence due to the lack of legislation to protect them. The written media have no legal restrictions and newspaper publishing is entirely liberal. The extensive freedom of the press means that no exact number of publications can be established, although some research put an estimate of around 900 print media outlets for 2006. The largest-circulation daily newspapers include Dneven Trud and 24 Chasa.

Non-printed media sources, such as television and radio, are overseen by the Council for Electronic Media (CEM), an independent body with the authority to issue broadcasting licenses. Apart from a state-operated national television channel, radio station and the Bulgarian News Agency, a large number of private television and radio stations exist. However, most Bulgarian media experience a number of negative trends, such as general degradation of media products, self-censorship and economic or political pressure.

Internet media are growing in popularity due to the wide range of available opinions and viewpoints, lack of censorship and diverse content.

== Legislative framework ==
The main legislative base is the 1998 Radio and Television Act, amended several times since. Many issues still persist in the field The EU 2007 Audiovisual Media Services Directive was transposed in Bulgarian law in 2010, including the requirements for cultural diversity.

Defamation in Bulgaria is decriminalised but punishable with large fines. Government officials have filed suits against journalists in the past, though courts tend to favour the latter and preserve press freedom. Legislation on access to information is fairly robust, although institutions may still improperly deny access and courts may act inconsistently on the issue.

Media concentration is an issue and ownership transparency is lacking. A law was adopted in 2014 to restrict media ownership from offshore tax haven-based companies.

=== Status and self-regulation of journalists ===
Journalists in Bulgaria work on decreasing salaries and face job insecurity, making work conditions more and more conducive to self-censorship and unethical practices.

Violation of ethical and professional standards is often reported, particularly in the print press. Codes of Conduct for journalists have been drafted by several media and professional organizations after 1989, including the Union of Bulgarian Journalists, the Free Speech Forum and the Centre for Independent Journalism. In 2004, an Ethical Code of Bulgarian Media was drafted with support from EU experts, though it was rejected by part of the Bulgarian journalist scene.

The Ethics Committee for the Print Media and the Ethics Committee for the Electronic Media were established in late 2005 after long debate, institutionalising mechanisms of self-regulation in the Bulgarian media sector.

The New Bulgarian Media Group (NBMG), owned by Irina Krasteva and controlled by her son and MP Delyan Peevski has a long history of cross-partisan pro-governmental bias. In June 2014, a spat between Peevski and a bank owner spurred negative report on NBMG media that caused a bank run and forced the financial institute to temporarily close down.

The 2014 European elections and parliamentary elections were closely followed by the media, but a large portion of the coverage consisted in unlabelled paid partisan content. Right-wing-affiliated print and broadcast media often carry hate speech against minorities and migrants.

== Media outlets ==
The Bulgarian media panorama is pluralistic, although media outlets remain influenced by the political and economic interests of their owners and main advertisers. The shrinking advertising market has made the media more and more dependent on state advertising and other subsidies, in particular for small local media outlets.

=== Print media ===
Freedom of expression and free competition in the media market were introduced in Bulgaria after 1989. Newspaper publishing is not regulated by law, and no audit office or official record of the number of publications exist. Over 900 print media titles were estimated in 2007, but their number is today greatly reduced after the effects of the economic crisis. The nationally distributed dailies were 14 in 2009; circulation per capita is very low. Peevski's New Bulgarian Media Group (NBMG) and the competitor Media Group Bulgaria Holding own most of the private newspapers.

The dominant form on the market is that of "hybrid tabloids", combining both quality press and tabloid features, including scandalous reporting, such as the dailies Trud and 24 Chasa, published by the German WAZ-Mediengruppe). The convergence is due to the failure in establishing quality broadsheets newspapers, leading instead popular dailies to extend their reach and occupy their niche. Other widely distributed newspapers include Standart, Novinar, Express, Monitor, and Telegraph - the latter being the only one to increase its circulation during the crisis, due to a lower price. Dnevnik is deemed the most trustworthy on business and economy, but has a low circulation, together with Pari, edited by the Swedish Bonnier Group. Political newspapers include Douma, of the Bulgarian Socialist Party, and Ataka (lit. "Attack"), of the homonymous nationalist party.

To complement revenues from sales and advertisement, which most often do not arrive at covering production costs, Bulgarian newspapers rely on contributions from business circles and political parties, hence opening up to avenues for political and commercial influences.

The regional print press include 10 dailies in the main towns of the country, as well as local publications coming out from once to three times per week.

Weeklies include the business-oriented Kapital and Banker, and the popular 168 Chassa and Politika, together with the specialised Kultura. Yellow weeklies (Show, Weekend, Galeria) have recently entered the market. Magazines included around 100 titled in late 2009, including Tema and Praven Svyat.

The Bulgarian print press market was totally dominated by the German WAZ group from 1996 onwards, both at national and local level. In December 2010 WAZ Mediagroup sold all its assets in Bulgaria to a joint venture between Austrian investors and local tycoons. Until then the company had owned the two largest daily newspapers Trud and 24 hours, the weekly newspaper 168 hours, and a large portfolio of magazines.

The New Bulgarian Media Group, deemed close to the Turkish-minority Movement for Rights and Freedoms party emerged in 2007 and got own Monitor, Express, Telegraph (dailies), Politika, Weekend, Meridian Match (weeklies), the Borba newspaper and a publishing house (in the city of Veliko Turnovo).

=== Radio broadcasting ===
From 1935 to 1989 there was a state monopoly on radio broadcasts in Bulgaria. After liberalization, the market now features a high number of private, national and local radio stations.

The sector is mainly controlled by four foreign groups: the Irish Communicorp Group, SBS Broadcasting Group (since 2007 part of ProSiebenSat.1 Media AG), US Emmis Communications, and News Corporation Group (owned by Rupert Murdoch). A Bulgarian owner, Focus, joined them in late 2009. They overall control over 20 radio stations.

The two national-coverage radio stations are the Bulgarian National Radio (BNR), with two channels (Horizont and Hristo Botev), and the private Darik radio. BNP's Radio Bulgaria broadcasts abroad, as well as in 7 regional centres in the country.

=== Television broadcasting ===
Television in Bulgaria was introduced in 1959. Although the Bulgarian media market is small, it is one of the most vibrant and highly competitive in Central and Eastern Europe. At the turn of the century, global players such as News Corporation, Modern Times Group, Central European Media Enterprises and Fox Broadcasting Company briefly entered and subsequently exited the Bulgarian TV market due to shrinking revenues, political pressure and the effect of the global recession of 2008.

Two of the leading TV stations, bTV and Nova TV, are foreign-owned. The third is the national public service broadcaster, Bulgarian National Television; BNT is deemed nonpartisan, but remains vulnerable to political interference from the government. The fourth free-to-air TV network is Bulgaria On Air, owned by Investor.BG (part of the controversial TIM Group of Varna).

Privately owned television channels started to appear immediately after the regime change. Most were associated with a cable television (CATV) network run by the same parent company. Around 1994-1995 private over-the-air broadcasters also appeared, but they usually only operated within a single area. Nova Television and 7 Dni TV (7 дни, meaning 7 days) were two of the first such channels, available only in Sofia. After bTV took over Efir 2's frequencies, another competition selected Nova Television, already popular in cable networks around the country, as the second privately owned national channel in Bulgaria. The authorities currently refuse to license further analogue terrestrial channels (including local ones), until DVB-T broadcasting is started.

Switch off to Digital terrestrial television (DVB-T) was completed on 30 September 2013, after a 7-month simulcast period, with 96,2% of the population under DVB-T broadcasting coverage.

=== Cinema ===
Public funds for the Bulgarian cinema have dried up after the socialist period. Bulgaria has produced three films and two documentaries per year with state subsidies, afforded under tender procedures. Sponsorships also support the Bulgarian film production.

=== Telecommunications ===
The Bulgarian telecommunication market, now privatised, is shared mainly among three actors: A1 Bulgaria (owned by A1 Austria Austria Group), Telenor (owned by Czech PPF), and Vivacom (controlled by Russia's VTB). A1 Bulgaria and Telenor Bulgaria dominate the mobile market, while Vivacom retains dominance on the 2.3 million landlines. Mobile phones in 2007 amounted to 9.87 million lines, with 110% penetration rate.

The telephony system features an extensive but antiquated telecommunications network inherited from the Soviet era; quality has improved; the Bulgaria Telecommunications Company's fixed-line monopoly terminated in 2005 when alternative fixed-line operators were given access to its network; a drop in fixed-line connections in recent years has been more than offset by a sharp increase in mobile-cellular telephone use fostered by multiple service providers; the number of cellular telephone subscriptions now exceeds the population.

=== Internet ===
Internet access reached 55% of the population in 2014. Online media are more and more used as means of information, and social media have often used as a mobilisation tool.

- Top-level domains: .bg and .бг. (proposed, Cyrillic)
- Internet users:
  - 3.9 million users, 72nd in the world; 55.1% of the population, 74th in the world (2012);
  - 3.4 million users, 63rd in the world (2009);
  - 1.9 million users (2007).
- Fixed broadband: 1.2 million subscriptions, 52nd in the world; 17.6% of population, 53rd in the world (2012).
- Wireless broadband: 2.8 million, 55th in the world; 40.3% of the population, 41st in the world (2012).
- Internet hosts:
  - 976,277 hosts, 47th in the world (2012);
  - 513,470 (2008).
- IPv4: 4.2 million addresses allocated, 0.1% of the world total, 589.7 addresses per 1000 people, 51st in the world (2012).

== Media Organisations ==
=== Media agencies ===
The public media agency in Bulgaria is the Bulgarian News Agency (BTA), established in 1898 and regulated by a 1994 Statute. it serves all media in the country.

Private web-based news agencies include Focus (now also a player on the radio market).

=== Trade unions ===
The Union of Publishers in Bulgaria (UPB) represents many owners of newspapers, magazines and books, though not all of them.

The Association of the Bulgarian Broadcasters (ABBRO) represents the interests of the radio and television industry, and includes 60 companies representing 160 licensed radio and TV stations (2007 data).

The Union of Bulgarian Journalists, stemming from its socialist roots, did not manage to establish itself as a professional organisation to protect journalists' interests.

NGOs in the media sector, dealing with media freedom and professionalisation of journalism, include Access to Information Program, Media Development Centre, Centre for Independent Journalism.

=== Regulatory authorities ===
In lack of any specific law on the printed media, there is not any specific regulatory or supervisory body either.

The Council for Electronic Media (CEM), established by the 1998 Radio and Television Act, checks compliance with regulations about advertising, sponsorship, copyright, protection of youth and minors, and considers violation complaints brought by experts and citizens. Five of its members are elected by Parliament, four are named by the President. Its independence from political and corporate pressures remains a matter of debate, and several of its actions have been controversial. The CEM is deemed as subject to multiple political and economic pressures.

== Censorship, self-censorship, soft-censorship and media freedom ==
Bulgaria scores as "free" in Freedom House' 2025 report, scoring 70 points. In Reporters Without Borders' World Press Freedom Index, Bulgaria is ranked 70th in 2025

According to a 2016 report of the World Association of Newspapers and News Publishers (WAN IFRA), prepared by the South East Europe Media Organisation (SEEMO), the independence and pluralism of Bulgaria's media has eroded steadily over the past decade. In Bulgaria, media freedom and freedom of expression are increasingly constrained despite constitutional guarantees and right to access public information protected by the Law on Access to Public Information.

According to WAN IFRA, Bulgarian authorities are increasingly employing tools of "soft censorship" to dominate and influence the country's media and limiting access to information and informed policy debate. Soft censorship, or indirect censorship, is defined as any official actions aiming at influencing media output, short of legal or extralegal bans, direct censorship, or physical attacks on media outlets and media professionals. These forms of indirect censorship include selective and partisan allocation of funds and advertising, as well as biased application of regulations and allocation of licenses, which can influence editorial content but also affect media outlets' sustainability.

One of the main tool leading to official soft censorship in Bulgaria is, according to WAN IFRA, biased state funding for media. Allocation of advertising and subsidies are opaque and non transparent. The situation has deteriorated due to the financial crisis which resulted in an increased dependency on government funding and in media content which avoid any criticism against government and official actions.

Many journalists cannot report in an impartial way and many are unwilling to openly speak about soft censorship as they fear of losing their jobs.

Most media which are not controlled by the state, are in the hands of businesses with close ties to the governmental structures. Transparency of media ownership is poor, but media ownership can be connected to a handful of leading political and business interests. Media owners and journalists know that in such a context critical coverage of people in government and public institutions the control or influence the allocation of funds may lead to the denial or withdrawal of such support, thus putting in danger their financial viability. Self-censorship may be necessary for economic survival.

According to the 2016 WAN IFRA's report, there are fewer physical attacks on journalists, although different threats are still reported. Much more common is use of libel and defamation lawsuits to intimidate and influence journalists or media outlets that not self-censor. Even though imprisonment for liberal and defamation was abolished in 1999, still they remain criminal offenses under Bulgarian criminal code. Convictions grounded in such cases are few, but the concrete possibility of prosecution entails a chilling effect on active, open and critical reporting.

Pressures and intimidations on journalists are widespread, giving rise to self-censorship. Police also sometime questions media professionals about their activities. High-level politicians often display intolerance towards media criticism. Impunity for crimes against journalists remains the norm. A June 2013 survey of 150 Bulgarian journalists by the Bulgarian affiliate of the Association of European Journalists remarked that 80% of them reported the existence of undue pressures and 60% said that internal pressures had distorted editorial contents.

- In July 2012 in Varna a journalist for Dnevnik and Capital received threats by mail against his investigatives reports on corruption in local building projects.
- In 2013, an investigative journalist reported several threats to his life and safety to the police, linked to his investigations on the files and crimes of the former communist State Security Agency.
- In April 2014 the car of a TV host was set on fire for the second time in a year.
- In June 2014 two journalists who were taking pictures were threatened and attacked by politician Kiril Rashkov and two of his aides.

== Concentration of media ownership and media pluralism ==
=== Overview ===
Concentration of media, both in terms of ownership and audience, is very high in Bulgaria. Except for the Public Service Media, no media-specific legislation regulates media ownership concentration and the issue falls within the scope of the general competition law. The Law on Radio and Television establishes only a general principle that a media licensing application must comply with the competition protection legislation. However, according to experts, this general provision proves to be inadequate. The Constitutional Court recognised media pluralism as an intrinsic part of media freedom, however “the principle of media pluralism is not respected in practice”.

According to the Media Pluralism Monitor one of the major problems is the lack of effective legal remedies against media concentrations. Concern over concentration of media ownership in Bulgaria have also been raised by the European Commission in the first EU Anti-Corruption report which found out that media ownership in Bulgaria is increasingly concentrated, thus compromising editorial independence.

In a nutshell, there are two main obstacles for the effective reduction of media concentrations in Bulgaria: non-transparent media ownership and the lack of media-specific legislation regulating media concentration. These obstacles cannot be removed without political will for this.

=== Legal framework ===
Unlike a number of European states, in Bulgaria there are not special rules concerning the supervision of mergers and acquisitions in the media sector. This supervision aims at ruling out the possibility that a media business or person has an excessive interest in one or more media sectors.

There are no provisions on media concentration in the Radio and Television Act applying to this media sector. As for print media, the sector is not regulated by law so there are no rules related to competition either. Issues related to concentration of ownership in the sector of digital media have not been discussed yet (2016).

Media fall under the regulation of the Commission for the Protection of Competition (CPC) which is in charge of overseeing concentration among undertakings, prohibiting anti-competitive agreements, decisions and practices, as well as abuse of dominant position. The Commission defines market concentration and the exemptions from it. Businesses are obliged by law to report to the Commission in case their income exceeds a certain threshold. In such cases the Commission allows concentration if it does not lead to the establishment or increasing of a dominant position, which would significantly prevent competition in the relevant market. In case of failure to report, or of concentration prohibited by the commission, it may impose sanctions.

In 2010, a new draft law on electronic media was discussed and the Commission for the Protection of Competition issued an opinion assessing the compliance of the proposal with the Protection of Competition Act. The Commission stated that in evaluating the risk of concentration it relies solely on an economic analysis, checking only the market share of the respective media, as well as audience share and advertising market share. The Commission does not take into consideration factors like the potential impact of the concentration on media content and the public significance of such impact. It thus observed that specific regulatory considerations regarding the media market, such as the need to guarantee pluralism and freedom of expression, are not taken into account by the Commission itself when overseeing concentrations.

The case law of the regulatory authority regarding media concentration in Bulgaria clearly shows that further regulation and supervision are needed in order to guarantee that non-market principles, such as media pluralism, are taken into consideration in assessing transactions falling under competitive law. According to experts, effective measures for ensuring media pluralism should not be limited to self-regulation measures, but include the introduction of a body in charge of conducting non-economic analysis to assess the influence of media outlets. However, such measures are not endorsed on political level.

=== Broadcast sector ===
In Bulgaria, the only legal explicit restrictions on media ownership is enshrined in the Law on Radio and Television, adopted in 1998 and amended several times since then. The Law was elaborated with the aim of regulating the market of broadcast media. Although the Law was not conceived specifically to address the issue of concentration, it includes restrictions on cross-ownership, pertaining only to national broadcasters. According to the law, licenses cannot be awarded to legal persons (or persons related to legal persons) which already possess licenses for local radio or television stations. This amendment was introduced after discovering cases of local operators acquiring licenses for national broadcasting. The Law also stipulates that national operators cannot become owners of local and regional stations. It also requires applicants to declare that they do not hold stakes, shares or other rights of participation in radio and television broadcasters above the threshold set by anti-trust legislation.

The law regulates the operation of Bulgarian broadcasters and contains some provisions restricting broadcast licenses and regulates the registration of cable programmes. Several provisions aim at protecting the media environment from the entry of dubious capital. For instance, the Law establishes that businesses connected with insurance services are ineligible for applying for a broadcast license. This provision is the result of a specific feature of the Bulgarian economy, where certain insurance companies born out of structures related to the previous regime's security services sector. However, in practice, due to the weakness of the Bulgarian media market which is unable to sustain the broadcast and print media, the opportunities for the entry of suspicious capitale into the media sphere have recently increased. Also, the law excludes from holding a license of a broadcast media telecommunications operators placed in a monopoly situation on the market (i.e. the state telecommunications company Bulgarian Telecommunications Company) and advertising agencies or companies including partners or shareholders having interests in the advertisement market.

When applying for a license in the broadcasting sector, the applicant is required to submit a declaration showing who the owners are and what their shares are, including document showing the origin of the capital for the last three years. Also, the application should include a list of media enterprises in which the persons are shareholders or partners.

=== Press distribution ===
Tendencies towards concentration characterise the area of press distribution as well. Some of the factors contributing to this concern the possibility for a publisher to be a distributor at the same time; the aggregation of ownership in non-transparent way; and political connections and dependencies influencing the sector. A dominant position in this sector impedes the fair distribution of small publishers' works. In 2011, the Commission for the Protection of Competition carried out an analysis on the press distribution sector. It found out that in the period from 2009 to 2011 there was a pooling of the distributors on the market aiming at optimising costs exploit the advantages of economies of scale and scope. Such integration impeded the entry of new actors on the market and led to market concentration.

=== The case of the New Media Group ===
Media concentration has been widely debated in Bulgaria since the 1990s. After the change from Communism to the market economy, the country faced the issue of concentration: the monopoly positions of the state media were replaced by the domination of several private media groups. In the 1990s the problem affected in particular the print sector: two most influential newspapers at that time - Trud and 24 hours - were purchased by the WAZ Group. The group dominated the Bulgarian media market until the late 2000s. In the late 2000s, the creation and rapid grow of the New Media Group were seen again as a case of media ownership concentration in the sector of print and online media. At stakes there was the group's links with politics and a bank. The group purchased local media, thus acquiring a dominant position in the local media market and in print media distribution. According to some estimates, the company gained a 70-80% share in the print media distribution market. The case of the New Media Group lead to public debate in 2001 that forced the Commission on the Protection of Competition to make a sectoral analysis of the concentration in the print media distribution market. The study found that the concentration in 2009-2011 constituted an obstacle to new competitors wishing to enter the market . The commission also concluded that there was a lack of transparent rules in the field. However, it issued a permission for such concentration on the basis that it would not establish or increase a dominant position in the distribution market.

=== Concentration of media ownership in practice ===
According to the Media Pluralism Monitor, "concentration of media ownership is very high". The top 4 major owners in the broadcasting sector have an aggregated market share (based on advertising revenue only) of 93.35%. The top 4 major owners of daily newspapers reach an aggregated market share of 79.7%. As for Internet Service Providers (ISPs), they have an estimated market share which is above 50%. Concentration trends are also present in terms of audience and readership whose concentration is "very high" according to the Media Pluralism Monitor. In television, the top 4 major owners have an audience share that is above 70%; as for the radio sector, the aggregated share of the top 4 major owners is 83.16%. The top 4 major newspaper owners have an estimated readership share between 25 and 49%, and the subscription share of the top 4 ISPs is estimated to be above 50%.

=== Political and economic influence on media owners ===
In Bulgaria, there are significant links between media owners and other actors operating in the economic landscape. According to expert Nelly Ognyanova, there are unregulated links between media, money and power. This fact became publicly known following a joint access to information request submitted by 11 biggest newspapers in 2010, which revealed that a media group owning newspapers, internet outlets and a TV station borrowed large amounts of money from a big bank, the Corporate Trade Bank. Also, the information disclosed showed that the same bank hosted a considerable amount of budget money of several ministers as well as bank accounts of relevant state-owned companies operating in the field of energy, public transport, defence and information service. The owner of such media group, Delyan Peevsky, also runs businesses in other sectors, such as construction, tobacco and newspapers distribution. Moreover, his businesses are allegedly involved in big public procurements. The group is also connected with the political party, the Movement for Rights and Freedoms (DPS) which has been influential for many years. Mr. Peevsky is the son of Irena Krasteva, the owner of many of the print media outlets within the New Media Group. Bulgarian press revealed the existence of connections between the New Media Group and political parties and other businesses. This is not the only case of political influence over the media in Bulgaria. For instance, there are some media which are officially owned by political figures or parties, a case that is not prohibited by law in Bulgaria.

== State Funding ==
The communication campaigns on EU funds turned out to be one of the funding sources for the Bulgarian media. The budget on advertising for the period 2007-2014 was 84.3 mln. EUR (165 mln. BGN). A detailed distribution of the funds between outlets isn't available as the contracts between ministries and media were conducted by advertising agencies and other intermediaries.

== See also ==
- Transparency of media ownership in Bulgaria
- Access to public information in Bulgaria
