= List of newspapers in Bulgaria =

Below is a list of newspapers published in Bulgaria.

== 0-9 ==
- 168 Chasa
- 24 Chasa (daily) (left-wing)
- 7 Dni Sport

== A ==
- ABV
- Agrovestnik
- Arh i Art borsa
- Ataka
- Avto Moto Svyat
- Avto trud

== B ==
- Balgarsko voynstvo
- Bilka
- Biznes kontakti
- Biznes vesti
- Bojie slovo
- Byudjeten konsultant
- Byuletin Voenen glas
- Bulgaria Today
- Bulgaria Today/Bulgaria Dnes
- Bulgarian army
- Bulgarian farmer
- Bulgarian transport newspaper
- Bulgarian writer

== C ==
- Capital (weekly) (liberal conservative, pro-business)

== D ==
- Dar
- Darjaven vestnik
- Democratsiya
- Detonatsia
- Dneven Trud
- Dnevnik (daily)
- Duma

== G ==
- Gimnazist
- Glaven schetovoditel

== I ==
- Idealen dom
- Ikonomicheski jivot
- Imoti
- Impuls
- Iskrenno i lichno

== J ==
- Jena
- Jenski svyat
- Jensko charstvo
- Jensko zdrave

== K ==
- Krisse-basse
- KESH
- Kultura
- Kuraj

== L ==
- Levski
- Lichna drama
- Literaturen vestnik

== M ==
- Makedonia
- Maja Lugter
- Media svyat
- Meditsinski magazin
- Mejduchasie
- Meridian Match
- Misterii na tsilivizatsyata
- Mobilen svyat
- Monitor (daily)
- Moyata sadba
- Morski vestnik
- Moto spravochnik

== N ==
- Natsionalen kurier 5
- Natsionalen podem
- Natsionalna biznes poshta
- Nad 55
- Naroden lechitel
- Nasluka
- Nie jenite
- NLO

== O ==
- Osteoporoza

== P ==
- Pchela i kosher
- Pensioneri
- Politika
- Praktichna domakinya
- Prelom

== R ==
- Rabotnichesko delo
- Retsepti za zdrave
- Revyu
- Ribar
- Ribolov
- Rikcho
- Riki kandidat-gimnazist
- Rusia dnes

== S ==
- Sega (daily)
- Semeen advokat
- Semeen globus
- Slavia
- Smyah
- Standart (daily)
- Stomatologichen svyat
- Strogo sektretno
- Svetat v mrejata
- Svobodna misal

== T ==
- Taber Sofia
- Telegraf (daily)
- Trud (daily)

== V ==
- Vestnikat
- Vkusen svyat
- Vsichko za vseki

== Z ==
- Za jenata
- Zastrahovatel
- Zemedelska tehnika
- Zemedelsko zname
- Zemia
- Zlatna vazrast
- Zora Nova
- Zornitsa

== See also ==
- List of magazines in Bulgaria
