= Access to public information in Bulgaria =

Access to public information and freedom of information (FOI) refer to the right of access to information held by public bodies also known as "right to know". Access to public information is considered of fundamental importance for the effective functioning of democratic systems, as it enhances governments' and public officials' accountability, boosting people participation and allowing their informed participation into public life. The fundamental premise of the right of access to public information is that the information held by governmental institutions is in principle public and may be concealed only on the basis of legitimate reasons which should be detailed in the law.

Access to Public Information in Bulgaria is a right guaranteed by the 1991 Constitution. It is regulated by the Access to Public Information Act first introduced in 2000 and amended in December 2015. The amendments enhanced proactive disclosure, encouraged electronic requests and facilitate re-use of information, in line with Directive 2013/37/EU on the Re-Use of Public Sector Information.

== Background ==
In 2014, a public consultation on the amendments to be introduced in the access to information legislation was initiated. In the Summer of 2014, a working group was set up at the Ministry of Transport Information Technologies and Communications with the mandate of drafting amendments to the Bulgarian legislation regarding the introduction of the revised Directive 2013/37/EU on the Re-use of Public Sector Information of the European Parliament and the Council of 26 June 2013. The amended Directive enlarged the scope of the re-use of public sector information by including archives, libraries and museums.

The initiative of amending the Bulgarian law on access to public information was also prepared in the framework of drafting and discussing the National Plan under the Open Government Partnership initiative.

In November 2015, the Bulgarian National Assembly adopted amendments to the Access to Public Information Act to enhance proactive disclosure, encourage electronic requests and facilitate re-use of information.

According to Professor Georgi Lozanov, a former member of the Council for Electronic Media, the introduction of the Access to Information Law could help in making more transparent the media sector, in particular media ownership and sources of funds which are largely opaque in Bulgaria.

== Legal Framework ==
=== Constitution ===
Article 41 of the Bulgarian Constitution of 1991 states that everyone shall be entitled to seek, receive and impart information, provided that this right shall not be exercised to the detriment of national security, public order, public health and morality. Article 41 entitles citizens to obtain information from state bodies and agencies on any matter of legitimate public interest which is not a state or other secret prescribed by law and does not affect the rights of other.

=== Access to Public Information Act ===
In Bulgaria access to public information is regulated by the Access to Public Information Act enacted in 2000, and amended in 2008 and 2015. The Law entitles any person or legal entity to the right of access to public information in any form held by state institutions and other entities financed by state budget and exercising public functions.

=== 2015 amendments to the law regulating access to public information ===
The amended legal framework on access to public information introduced an extended the list of categories of information which are subject to proactive disclosure. Also, amendments introduced an explicit duty to publish any information that have been provided on requests more than three times, along with a broader obligation to publish online information of public interest.

The amendments also aimed at encouraging the submission of electronic requests, which can be sent with no need of electronic signature.

Another novelty concerns the presumption of third-party consent, meaning that if a public authority asks for a third-party consent for the disclosure of requested information affecting it, the lack of response within 14 days will be presumed as consent and the information should be completely provided, Thanks to the amendment, thus, the requested information is not considered, as it was before the amendment, a dissent by the third party which obliged the public body to provide only partial access.

The amendments also introduced the Directive 2013/37/UE, revising the first Directive on the Re-Use of Public Sector Information (2003) which was transposed in 2007 in the access to Public Information Act. In line with the revised directive, the amended law extended the re-use regime by prohibiting any exclusive clauses in giving rights to use whole databases coherently with the Directive provision that obliges any public body in the EU to provide equal availability of such databases on equal conditions and with costs for accessing calculated in transparent way.

The new legal framework adopts a broader definition of the "public law organizations" that are subject to both access to information requests and information re-use. Libraries, museums and archives have been included among the institutions that have to disclose information for re-use. According to the amended law, public sector bodies are obliged to make their documents available in a user-friendly manner and in open and machine-readable format, together with their metadata in a government Open Data Portal.

== Main provisions under the Access to Information Law ==
Under the Bulgarian law on Access to Public Information, all state bodies, including their directorates/regional/local offices/territorial units, etc. are subject to access to information. Also, the law applies to local government authorities, including mayors and municipal councils. Moreover, other entities are subject to the access to information law, in particular all authorities which perform public functions prescribed by the law, named "public law entities", for instance the Electronic Media Council, the National Health Insurance Fund and the like, and individuals and legal entities financed with funds from the state budget or the European Union (both subsidies and EU projects and programmes).

The law applies to any information generated or held by state authorities, local authorities and other entities obliged under the law. The right of access to public information is restricted in case of information:

- which are classified as state or official secrete;
- which relates to negotiations and to the preparatory work of an act;
- which affects third party's interests (trade secret and personal data);
- which access has been granted to the requester within the preceding six months.

However, according to the law, even if there is a reason for refusal, information shall be disclosed if there is an overriding public interest which disclosure contributes to enhance.

Information requests may be submitted either orally or in written form. According to the law, each authority is obliged to appoint for its office an official with the responsibility of handling the requests.

In line with international best practices, access to information in Bulgaria is free of charge. Paying a fee can only be required to cover the actual costs of reproducing the document (copies, prints, etc.)

Under the Bulgarian law, in case requesters do not receive the information sought they may appeal to the court. The law does not establish an institution in charge of overseeing the implementation of the law in access to public information.

== Access to public information in practice ==
According to a study conducted by the NGO Access to Information Program (AIP) in 2015, every third institution in Bulgaria does not make public its regulatory acts and half of them do not do this with regard to the general administrative acts. Among the institutions which fail to publish their regulatory acts there are the Ministry of Foreign Affairs and many municipalities.

The study also finds out there is a bit more transparency in relation to the publication of databases and registers. The same holds good for the publication of programs and strategic documents, such as development strategies, and the like.

As for financial transparency, the report acknowledges an improvement since 2013, but still about half of the institutions do not publish their budgets on the Internet as required by the law. A good level of transparency has been registered on disclosure of information for public procurement tenders: 94% of institutions scrutinized by the AIP has a dedicated section on their websites.

The report found out that Bulgarian institutions do not comply with the new requirements of the Access to Public Information Act when it establishes that they are obliged to publish the information that they have provided to citizens more than three times on the grounds of freedom of information applications. According to the AIP survey, only 4% out of 565 institutions scrutinized had complied with this requirement at the time the survey was conducted during 2015. However, almost all institutions, around 97%, complied with the new requirement that introduced electronic applications for freedom of information requests.

The 2015 AIP survey revealed that the Ministry of Education and Science is the most transparent ministry in Bulgaria, while the Ministry of Foreign Affairs is the least transparent.

== See also ==
- Access to public information in Europe
- Freedom of information
- Freedom of information laws by country
- List of libraries in Bulgaria
- Transparency of media ownership in Europe
- Media of Bulgaria
- Transparency of media ownership in Bulgaria
