= List of magazines in Bulgaria =

During the second half of 2009 there were nearly 100 magazine titles in Bulgaria. There are also editions of international magazines such as Glamour and Grazia in addition to national magazines. The Bulgarian edition of Grazia, an Italian magazine, is the first international spin-off of the magazine.

The following is an incomplete list of current and defunct magazines published in Bulgaria. They may be published in Bulgarian or in other languages.

== Numerical titles ==
- 4x4

== A ==
- Avtoklasika

== B ==
- Bliasak

== C ==
- Cosmopolitan Bulgaria

== D ==
- Da znaem poveche
- Domashno Konservirane

== E ==
- Egoist

== F ==
- Fakel

== G ==
- Glamour Bulgaria

== K ==
- Kamioni

== L ==
- LIK
- Literary Club

== M ==
- Moeto dete
- Moto Club

== N ==
- Nash Dom

== O ==
- Odysseus

== P ==
- PC Mania
- Pricheska
- Praven Svyat

== R ==
- Regal

== S ==
- Starshel

== T ==
- Tema

== V ==
- Vagabond

== See also ==
- List of newspapers in Bulgaria
