= Transparency of media ownership in Croatia =

Transparency of media ownership refers to the public availability of accurate, comprehensive and up-to-date information about media ownership structures to make possible for media authority and the wider public to ascertain who effectively owns and controls the media. Between 2011 and 2012, following some concerns on opaque activities which accompanied the process of privatisation of the media in Croatia, the government initiated the reform of the law on transparency of media ownership with the aim to avoid the concealment of information on media ownership structure.

The Croatian law provides the disclosure of information that are sufficient to establish who formally holds shares in the media organisations operating in Croatia. However, in practice, some obstacles have been observed. There are also some unclear aspects in the new legal framework which is the result of uncoordinated legal developments needed to complement the original Media Act with provisions to be applied to electronic media, which emerged several years later and that are now covered by a dedicated law, namely the Electronic Media Law. In general terms, the information disclosed can be accessed by the public at large, but, as a matter of fact, this is quite uncommon. In Croatia, the public debate on media ownership transparency developed only recently, in connection with the amendments to the Media Act and Electronic Media Act.

== General overview ==
Transparency of media ownership refers to the public availability of accurate, comprehensive and up-to-date information about media ownership structures. It is an essential component of any democratic media system and its crucial for media pluralism and democracy. A legal regime guaranteeing transparency of media ownership makes available all the information needed for finding out who effectively owns, controls and influences the media as well as media influence on political parties or state bodies. The importance of transparency of media ownership for any democratic and pluralist society has been broadly recognised by the European Parliament, the European Commission's High-Level Group on Media Freedom and Pluralism and the Council of Europe.

To ensure that the public knows who effectively owns and influences the media, national legal frameworks should ensure the disclosure of at least the following basic information:

- name and contact details of the media outlets;
- constitutional documents; size of shareholdings over a given threshold;
- name and contact details of direct owners with a given percentage of shareholding;
- identity of the persons with indirect control or have a significant interest in a given media company;
- citizenship/residence status of individuals with at least a certain shareholding percentage;
- country of domicile of company with at least a given shareholding percentage.

Importantly, to understand who really owns and controls a specific media outlet it is necessary to check who is beyond the official shareholdings and scrutinise indirect, controlling and beneficial ownership which refers on shares of a media company hold on behalf of another person. To be meaningful and easily accessible by the citizens and national media authorities, this information should be updated, searchable, free and reusable.

== Background ==
In 2011, concerns about opaque media financial flows led to changes to the laws regulating media ownership transparency to make possible the identification of media owners beyond a company back to individuals. Indeed, the relevant laws have been updated to ensure better ownership transparency of media publishers, in particular to avoid the concealment of the real media ownership structure. The process of privatisation of the print media in Croatia, which began in 2000, had been accompanied by corruption scandals and rumours of money laundering and the involvement of criminal groups in the sales of the biggest Croatian newspapers, i.e. Jutarnji list, Večerni List and Slobodna Dalmacija. The names of the real owners of these media was hidden behind secret contracts and informal agreements involving politicians, police and other high-profile individuals. Changes to the Media Act and the Electronic Media Act were very quick and passed with limited consultation by the Parliament in July 2011 for the Media Act and in June 2012 for the Electronic Media Act.

== Legal framework ==
Transparency of media ownership in Croatia is regulated by the Media Law (2011) and the Electronic Media Law (2012). These rules apply to all the media sectors, i.e. print, broadcast and online media which are required to regularly provide and update information on their shareholders. These laws contain provisions for disclosing ownership information to: the relevant media authorities, i.e. the Electronic Media Council in the case on online media (Electronic Media Act); to independent professional and business organisations such as the Croatian Chamber of Economy and other corporate and trade registers (Media Act); or directly to the public. In general terms, the Croatian legal framework requires media to reveal enough information to make possible the identification of their owners, be it an individual or a company. This includes data on all shareholdings over 1%, disclosure of beneficial ownership and of people with indirect interests and control as well as a prohibition on "secret" ownership. The information disclosed are provided directly to the public via the web and Official Gazette.

Upon request, the Croatian Chamber of Economy, which is responsible for collecting ownership data, must guarantee public access to the information submitted to it. This is in compliance with the recognised right of access to information under the Act on the Right to Access Information.

The amendments have had little impact on the ownership structure of Croatian media, which remain questionable. This is because most of the privatisation, which in many cases was reported to be suspicious or controversial, were completed before the amended laws entered into force.

== Transparency of media ownership in practice ==
Despite the good provisions enshrined in the reformed legal framework which built upon existing obligations, the lack of consultation that led to the amendments to the Media Act and the Electronic Media Act resulted in a series of shortcomings especially with regard to monitoring and enforcement of the laws. For instance, in practice, media companies in Croatia do not always comply with their obligation to publish information on indirect ownership and the law doesn't foresee a mechanism for monitoring, checking compliance and apply sanctions. Indeed, the Media act does not provide for effective mechanism enabling the Croatian Chamber of Economy to check that the information received are updated and correct. Given the scarcity of resources assigned to it, the Chamber has to rely on the assistance of other authorities such as the Croatian Competition Agency and the Company Register. Another critical point of the Croatian system regulating transparency of media ownership is that it does not guarantee the full disclosure of information on individuals holding shares of a media company. Indeed, often the name of a company is not enough for providing information on the individuals behind it. For example, on the basis of the information provided under the law regulating transparency of media ownership the media companies Europa digital d.o.o., Slobodna Dalmacija, EPH Media and Gloria Groupa apparently don't have anything in common, but they are all subsidiary companies within the EPH group, owned by WAZ and the businessman Ninoslav Pavić. Additionally, in practice, media outlets do not always disclose information on indirect ownership as required by the law. For example, the only shareholder listed for the media company Vecernji list d.d., which issues the daily paper Vecernji list is Styria Media International AG from Graz. Other relevant ownership information are not disclosed, for instance information regarding the important shareholders of Styra Media International AG or whether that company holds some shares for another person or a company. Furthermore, the publication of data in the Official Gazette is not monitored and since there is not a special issue of the Official Gazette listing the updates occurred during the year the search is complex and time-consuming.

In sum, despite the fact that the laws on transparency of media ownership are well defined, in practice is quite difficult to assess the actual ownership structures and reconstruct the networks of ownership and connected persons. The problem is exacerbated by the fact that, according to the Croatian law, different agencies are in charge of collecting data on ownership – the Council for Electronic media is responsible for online media and the Croatian Chamber of Commerce for print media – without a unique centralised monitoring system working across print, radio, television and online media.

In October 2014, the European Commission organised a consultative conference on transparency of media ownership and Croatia was mentioned as "a good practice" in this context. However, many panellists participating at the conference highlighted that it is important to insist on the improvement of the legal framework but that is not enough as, according to experts, it is more important to know who effectively controls the owners than who nominally owns the media.

== See also ==
- Transparency of media ownership in Europe
- Media of Croatia
- Media freedom in the European Union
- Concentration of media ownership
- Media transparency
