= Media relations =

Public relations with media outlets

Media relations involves working with media for the purpose of informing the public of an organization's mission, policies and practices in a positive, consistent and credible manner. It can also entail developing symbiotic relationships with media outlets, journalists, bloggers, and influencers to garner publicity for an organization. Typically, this means coordinating directly with the people responsible for producing the news and features in the mass media. The goal of media relations is to maximize positive coverage in the mass media without paying for it directly through advertising.

Many people use the terms public relations and media relations interchangeably. However, media relations as a practice is part of the overall set of public relations skills and techniques used to disseminate information. "Media relations" refers to the relationship that a company or organization develops with journalists, whereas "public relations" extends that relationship beyond the media to the general public. There is also integrated marketing that is related but not the same, integrated marketing attempts to unify all aspects of marketing communication. This can include advertising, sales promotion, public relations, direct marketing, and social media to create consistent, customer-focused messaging.

It is possible for communication between the media and the organization to be initiated by either side. However, dealing with the media presents unique challenges in that the news media cannot be controlled — they have ultimate control over whether stories pitched to them are of interest to their audiences. Because of this fact, ongoing relationships between an organization and the news media are vital. One way to ensure a positive working relationship with media personnel is to become deeply familiar with their "beats" and areas of interest. Media relations and public relations practitioners read magazines, journals, newspapers, and blogs to improve and relate to one's practice.

Organizations often compile what is known as a media list, or a list of possible media outlets who may be interested in an organization's information. The media can consist of thousands of magazine publications, newspapers, and TV and radio stations. Therefore, when a "newsworthy" event occurs in an organization, a media list can assist in determining which media outlet may be the most interested in a particular story.

Working with the media on behalf of an organization allows for awareness of the entity to be raised as well as the ability to create an impact with a chosen audience. It allows access to both large and small target audiences and helps in building public support and mobilizing public opinion for an organization. This is all done through a wide range of media and can be used to encourage two-way communication.

Possible reasons an organization may reach out to the media are:

- Launch of a new product/service
- Initiation of new factories/offices
- Financial results
- Organization sponsored events or awards
- Launch of organization promotional campaigns
- Recent disasters, strikes or organizational closures
- Awards/accolades for the company
- Visits from company dignitaries/celebrities
- Involvement in local/community activities
- Community engagement
- Providing a point of view on a negative news

== Media relations and information subsidy ==
Information subsidy consists of information that is provided to the press as supplemental material to help present their reporting. This includes information such as press releases, advertisements, and videos of related news events. An advantage of using information subsidies is that they can decrease or eliminate the need for completing additional research on the part of the media. Subsidies can be a good source of information for the media, however, it is important that the media vet the source for accuracy and bias.

By presenting ready-to-publish data, information subsidies can save journalists time and money. A study completed in 1999 estimated that nearly half of the information reported in newspapers came from information subsidies. Yet another survey suggested that most of the information received by journalists is never published. Trust in the source and content of the data are the criteria journalists use when determining whether or not they will use the material provided.

== Media relations and public relations practitioners ==
Practitioners of media relations (including publicist) are typically either public relations professionals or are part of an overall public relations function and strategy. This information is intended to benefit the public by educating them on news and other events. In October 2019, the International Public Relations Association (IPRA) announced its new definition of public relations as: "a decision-making management practice tasked with building relationships and interests between organizations and their public's based on the delivery of information through trusted and ethical communication methods". This definition is reflective of not only the relationships between organizations and their publics but also of the relevance of social media and shifting technologies and the importance of ethical communication.

Public relations practitioners expand their client's media coverage by staying up to date on news and current events that are relevant to their client. Because PR practitioners are usually focused on a client, some would argue that they are biased or attempt to sway public opinion. The media is often looking for a new story. PR practitioners are a place for the media to go to for newsworthy events. They often provide newsworthy or public service data, which can save the media the time required to complete their own research and sourcing.

The fact that PR specialists have been providing the news mass media with information for years will not change the trust level that the media has for the sources. Trust is a critical component between the media and PR practitioners and it must be present for their to be a successful working relationship. Part of the problem between journalists and PR practitioners is the perception that PR specialists have not been good at providing journalists with newsworthy material. Journalists express their thoughts and concerns to these PR specialists to allow for better communication and improvement of the type and quality of news data. As with any relationship, both parties must be committed to working together to achieve success.

== Ethical pitfalls ==
The phrase 'fake news' frequents current news outlets. the propagation of this phrase has driven a need for public relations practitioners to provide transparent and accurate information to the media. Responsibility also belongs to journalists themselves to authenticate information that they have been given. public relations practitioners may feel a requirement to embellish the truth for their clients but PR practitioners could help the communication process by providing more detail about specific news.

One way a PR practitioner can avoid ethical issues is to be upfront with their clients and the media regarding any potential ethical issues. The pressure for a PR practitioner can be great because of the need to work with multiple entities in order to produce their information. Having a basis for their personal and professional ethics will go a long way in helping a PR practitioner. This basis should include considering the interests of themselves, the media, and the entity they are representing. Respect for those involved and social responsibility should also be an inherent part of ethics. Another approach to ethics is based on virtue. This includes learning from others, being prepared to take risks, and practicing complete honesty in their reporting.

== See also ==
- Advertising
- Advertising management
- Consumer behaviour
- Brand management
- Integrated marketing communications
- List of marketing terms
- Marketing
- Marketing communications
- Public relations
