= Literary Club =

Literary Club may refer to:

- Literary Club of Cincinnati
- Literary Club (magazine), a Bulgarian literary e-magazine
- Literary Club, an alternate name for The Club (dining club)

== See also ==
- Book club (disambiguation)
