= Book club =

Book club may refer to:

== Organisations relating to books ==
=== Discussion ===
- Book discussion club, a group of people who meet to discuss a book or books that they have read
- Literature circle, a group of students who meet in a classroom to discuss a book or books that they have read

=== Sales ===
- Book sales club, a subscription-based method of selling and purchasing books
- Text publication society, also known as a book club, a subscription-based learned society dedicated to the publication and sale of scholarly editions of texts

== Film ==
- Book Club (film), a 2018 American comedy film
- Book Club: The Next Chapter, the 2023 sequel

== Television ==
- The Book Club, a former Australian television show that discussed books (2006–2017)
- The Richard & Judy Book Club, a regular chat show segment in the UK

== Other uses ==
- Bookclub (radio programme), a BBC Radio 4 programme
- The original name of Siam Commercial Bank, established 1904

== See also ==
- The Book Group, a 2002 British television sitcom
- Literary Club (disambiguation)
