= Media transparency =

Aspect of journalism and communications

Media transparency, also referred to as transparent media or media opacity, is a concept that explores how and why information subsidies are being produced, distributed and handled by media professionals, including journalists, editors, public relations practitioners, government officials, public affairs specialists, and spokespeople. In short, media transparency reflects the relationship between civilization and journalists, news sources and government. According to a textual analysis of "Information Subsidies and Agenda Building: A Study of Local Radio News", an information subsidy is defined as "any item provided to the media in order to gain time or space".

== Overview ==
Media transparency deals with the openness and accountability of the mass media and can be defined as a transparent exchange of information subsidies based on the ideas of newsworthiness. Media transparency is one of the biggest challenges of contemporary everyday media practices around the world as media outlets and journalists constantly experience pressure from advertisers, information sources, publishers, and other influential groups.

News sources may influence what information is published or not published. Sometimes, published information can also be paid for by news sources, but the end media product (an article, a program, a blog post) does not clearly indicate that the message has been paid or influenced in any way. Such media opacity, or media non-transparency, ruins the trust and transparency between the media and the public and have implications for transparency of new forms of advertising and public relations (such as native advertising and brand journalism).

Media transparency is defined to be a normative concept and is achieved when:

1. there are many competing sources of information;
2. the method of information delivery is known; and
3. funding of media production is disclosed and publicly available.

An important note concerning Media Transparency is the use of ICTs (Information and Communication Technology)".

== The background of ICTs and transparency (Heidegger and McLuhan) ==
Internet transparency has held a considerable fascination of social scientists. The basis to understanding transparency and technology is emphasized by Yoni Van Den Eede to be the work of Martin Heidegger and Marshall McLuhan. Eede claims, "In recent years several approaches – philosophical, sociological, psychological – have been developed to come to grips with our profoundly technologically mediated world" (Eede, 2011). Yet continues to explain that these recent discoveries would have not been made without the work first accomplished concerning media and technology by Heidegger and McLuhan.

Martin Heidegger began the studies without using the word transparency, but its relevance is clear within his "Tool Analysis". The "Tool Analysis" argues that one is never aware of the tools they use in their every life until it no longer functions as it should, or as Eede concludes, "the tool is 'transparent' in the sense that we don't notice it "as-tool". The tool in this context is media, and as the study argues we do not notice media and the presence it holds in our life. Eede expands on the Tool Analysis curated by Heidegger as she states there are two ways in which humans use tools, readiness to hand and presence at hand. This separation of readiness and presence is explained further by G. Harman as he argues that the theory proposed by Heidegger can be understood through what we consciously view as helpful versus what is unconsciously helping us (humankind). Harman claims, "If I observe a table and try to describe its appearance, I silently rely on a vast armada of invisible things that recede into a tacit background. The table that hovers visibly before my mind is outnumbered by all the invisible items that sustain my current reality: floor, oxygen, air conditioning, bodily organs" (Harman, 2010). Through understanding this 'table' analogy, one can conclude that the table in this sense is technology, and its use to create transparency and understanding within society concerning social and economic doings of government and the greater power of which governs each nation and entity is the vast background of which is overlooked, just as the surroundings of the table are. Through this understanding of theory, transparency can then be further explored for its major importance in creating ones environment consciously and unconsciously.

Another important theory to consider is Marshall McLuhan's "the medium is the message". McLuhan conducted his work in the 1960s, with the introduction of the global village and age of technology use in communications. The concept of transparency is heavily explored within McLuhan's media theory which examines the media as the channels of medium in which media is presented (television, radio, etc.) which are then defined to be the real messages of the media themselves, and emphasis is placed upon understanding the means of medium rather than content itself as they "manifest themselves first and foremost in the way we perceive, process and interpret sense data" (Eede, 2011). Through understanding the actual medium to be the message, and as the medium itself creates a greater understanding and transparent view of the world around us, one can conclude that McLuhan's work is essential to then looking to understand why ICTs and a sense of transparency concerning day to day life, government work, and national/ global work is of importance. McLuhan, to summarize, concluded that society must be more involved, and that its participates are actively looking to be more involved as they navigate their social understanding and surrounding.

== Propaganda and media transparency ==
Within the study conducted by the Government Information Quarterly, Media Transparency is understood through means of its ability to aid societies with openness and anti-corruption. This unbiased approach at understanding media transparency specifically deals with how media transparency is an important aspect of social and economic development. The article cited explores the four main channels of transparency at the governmental level; proactive dissemination by the government; release of requested materials by the government; public meetings; and leaks from whistleblowers. These four means of communication help to deter any type of negative propaganda posed by governments and officials and work towards complete transparency of which is arguably necessary to create a thriving social and economic system. Propaganda stands to be a threat to accurate distribution and intake of information, of which disrupts all that transparency works to accomplish. The following sections open on greater aspects of Propaganda, and different ways in which transparency is disrupted as well.

== Media bribery and corruption ==
Corruption and media bribery are of interest when considering Media Transparency. The concept of media bribery emerged in response to claims of bias within the media. This lack of media transparency can be perceived as a form of corruption. Media transparency is a means to diminish unethical and illegal practices in the relationships between news sources and the media. Within a study conducted by the Government Information Quarterly it is stated that, "The focus on corruption as an economic issue has been part of an overall rise in global interest in transparency. Internationally, corruption has received great attention since 1990 due to fears of increasing opportunities for illicit activity due to globalization (Brown & Cloke, 2005)". There are many areas of concern when it comes to bribery and corruption, specifically law enforcement and government regulation. Corruption of the media and barriers to transparency can be captured through means of propaganda and misinformation. These can be actively be worked against through means of administrative reform, stricter watch and regulation of law enforcement, and through means of social change.

== Media transparency and power (George Gerbner and Cultivation Theory) ==
Academics at the University of Oxford and Warwick Business School, conducting empirical research on the operation and effects of transparent forms of clinical regulation in practice, describe a form of 'spectacular transparency'. The social scientists suggest that government policy tends to react to high-profile media 'spectacles', leading to regulatory policy decisions that appear to respond to problems exposed in the media have new perverse effects in practice, which are unseen by regulators or the media.

The degree to which state agents work to influence video production contradicts the use of those images by news organizations as indexical, objective representations. Because people tend to strongly equate seeing with knowing, video cultivates an inaccurate impression that they are getting the "full picture". It has been said that "what is on the news depends on what can be shown". The case studies (include case studies) for this project demonstrate that what can be shown is often decided in concern with political agents. Essentially, the way the media presents its information can creates an illusion of transparency. The presentation of media is further explored for its interest in the human experience through work done by George Gerbner and his Cultivation Theory. As explained by analyst W. James Potter, Gerbner was "concerned with the influence that a much broader scope of messages gradually exerted on the public as people were exposed to media messages in their everyday lives" (Potter, 2014). Gerbner quenstioned previous theorists attempts to understand media and power over civilization by means of television programs and direct intake. Gerbner asserted that in order to understand the impact of the media, research must be done concerning the environment in which people are living, and studying the world as presented by medium channels. Potter argues that "while Gerbner recognized that there were individual differences in interpretations of messages, cultivation was not concerned about those variations in interpretations; instead, cultivation focused on the dominant meanings that the media presented to the public" (Potter, 2014). Through Gerbner's Cultural Indicators Research Project, power is explored through its presentation in the media, and George argues that to create a transparent environment in which cultural and social norms are unbiased, one must look to understand whether transparency is being held by media sources or if it is being manipulated in order to control civilization and keep power. The work of analyst John A. Lent uncovers Gerbner's understanding of power structure through the control of media and medium channels as he states," viewers came to consider the world as rightly belonging to the power and money elite depicted on television – young, white males, idealized as heroic doctors and other professionals. He warned that women, minorities and the elderly seeing these role models repeatedly were apt to accept their own inferior positions and opportunities as inevitable and deserved, which he said was an indictment of their civil rights" (Lent 2006 p.88). Power, then can be understood with those who control the media outlets, and the level of transparency concerning worldly events, biased opinions, and representation that are conveyed to the citizens who live within the media controlled environment. Power is not within the eye of the beholder, yet within those who project to the greater population.

== Electronic government ==
Electronic government and its use of the internet along with social media is a new way to get information concerning government work and service to citizens. The use of media in all electronic forms is argued to be an "influential factor in the restoration of trust in government because it has the potential to improve government performance and transparency" within the study published by the Public Performance and Management Review (Song and Lee, 2016). The study continues to argue that many studies have reported that through information and transaction services available on government websites, citizens feel a sense of effectiveness, accessibility, responsiveness, and satisfaction, all of which constitute an overall sense of trust in government. These information and transaction services are more specifically categorized as social media sites that connect citizens to their government. Song and Lee conclude that, "social media can be defined as a group of Web 2.0 technologies that facilitate interactions between users [...] By their nature, social media afford easy access to information through convenient devices like cell phones and tablets, enable user-created content, and provide visible social connections" (Song and Lee, 2016). From a citizens perspective, transparency is attained through understanding their local governments actions and movements, along with creating open lines of communication; all of which can be done through social media and other means of online communication. Song and Lee conclude following their experiment concerning media use in relation to government that " social media in government enable citizens to gain easier access to government and be more informed about current events, policies, or programs, heightening their perception of transparency in government" (Song and Lee, 2016). This conclusion argues for social media presence in governmental action and role in order to create transparency; media transparency is needed for a cohesive and close-knit society.

== Trust in government and transparency (Coleman) ==
The ability to curate trust is essential within the means of transparency and communication. Within the article published by Changsoo Song and Jooho Lee, the two explain trust though work compiled by social theorist J. S Coleman as he looks to simply trust through equivocal explanation. The study states that, "Three essential elements" are used in explaining what leads a potential trustor (e.g., the citizen) to vest trust in a trustee (e.g., the government):

p = chance of receiving gain (i.e., the probability that the trustee is trustworthy),
L = potential loss (if the trustee is untrustworthy), and
G =potential gain (if the trustee is trustworthy)

Song and Lee then apply this framework to governmental context and conclude that role of information is necessary in trust-building as governments must perform or take in action in their citizens interest (and visibly show this action or performance via social media), in order to gain trust in and respect for their work.

== See also ==
- Astroturfing
- Freedom of the press
- Front organization
- Journalism
- Journalism ethics and standards
- Media accountability
- Media bias
- Media manipulation
- Prior restraint
- Propaganda
- State media
- Transparency International
- Transparency (market)
- Transparency of media ownership in Europe
- Transparency of media ownership in Croatia
- Transparency of media ownership in Romania

== Further reading and videos ==
- Sakr, Naomi (2010). "News, Transparency and the Effectiveness of Reporting from Inside Arab Dictatorships". International Communication Gazette. 72: 35–50. doi:10.1177/1748048509350337. S2CID 145010412.
- Crow, Deserai Anderson (2010). "Local Media and Experts: Sources of Environmental Policy Initiation?". Policy Studies Journal. 38: 143–164. doi:10.1111/j.1541-0072.2009.00348.x.
- - YouTube (McLuhan Hot and Cold Theory)
