= List of libraries in Bulgaria =

This is a list of libraries in Bulgaria.

== National library ==
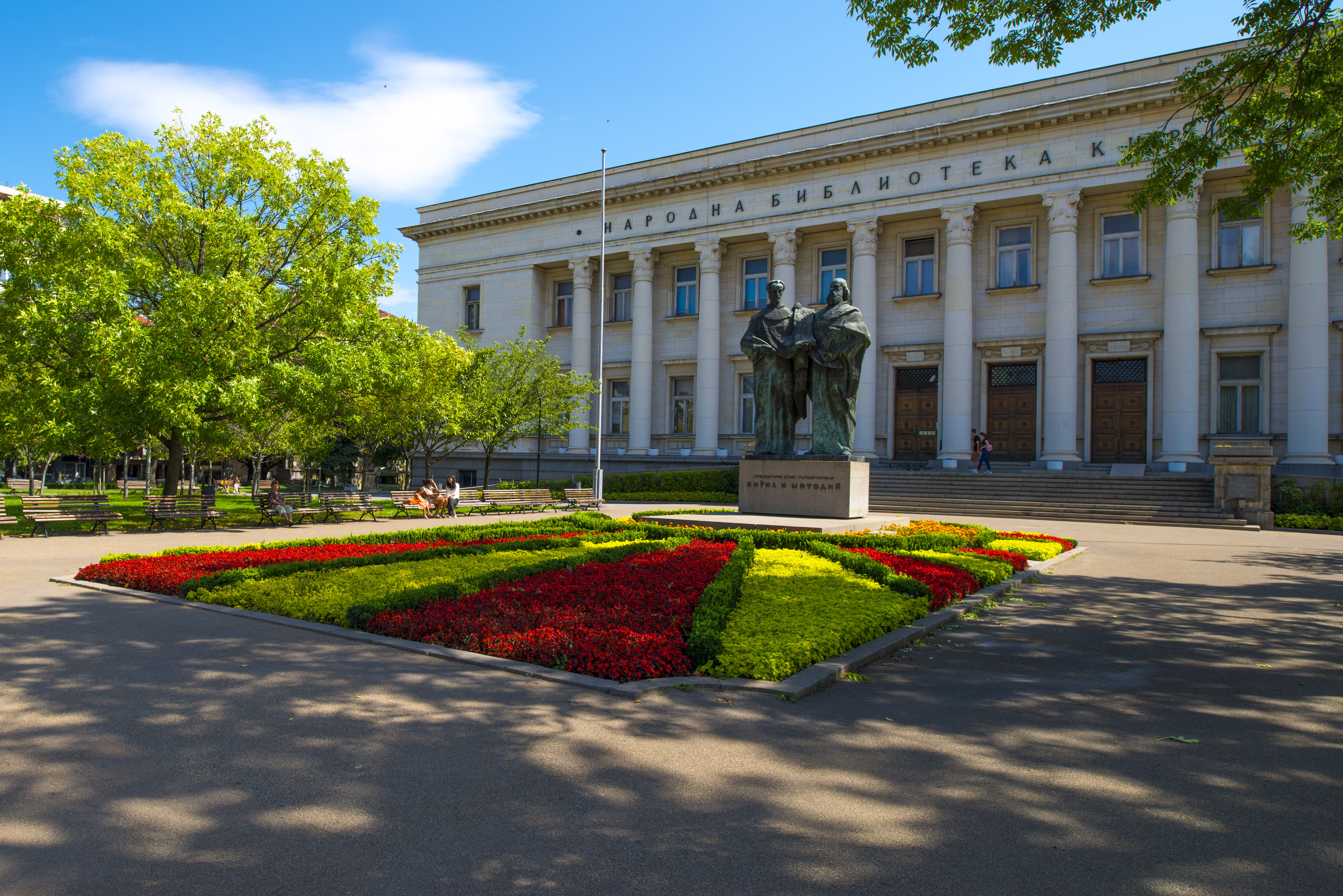
SS. Cyril and Methodius National Library

- SS. Cyril and Methodius National Library

== Research Libraries ==
- Central Library of the Bulgarian Academy of Sciences
- Central Research and Technical Library
- Central Medical Library

== Regional libraries ==
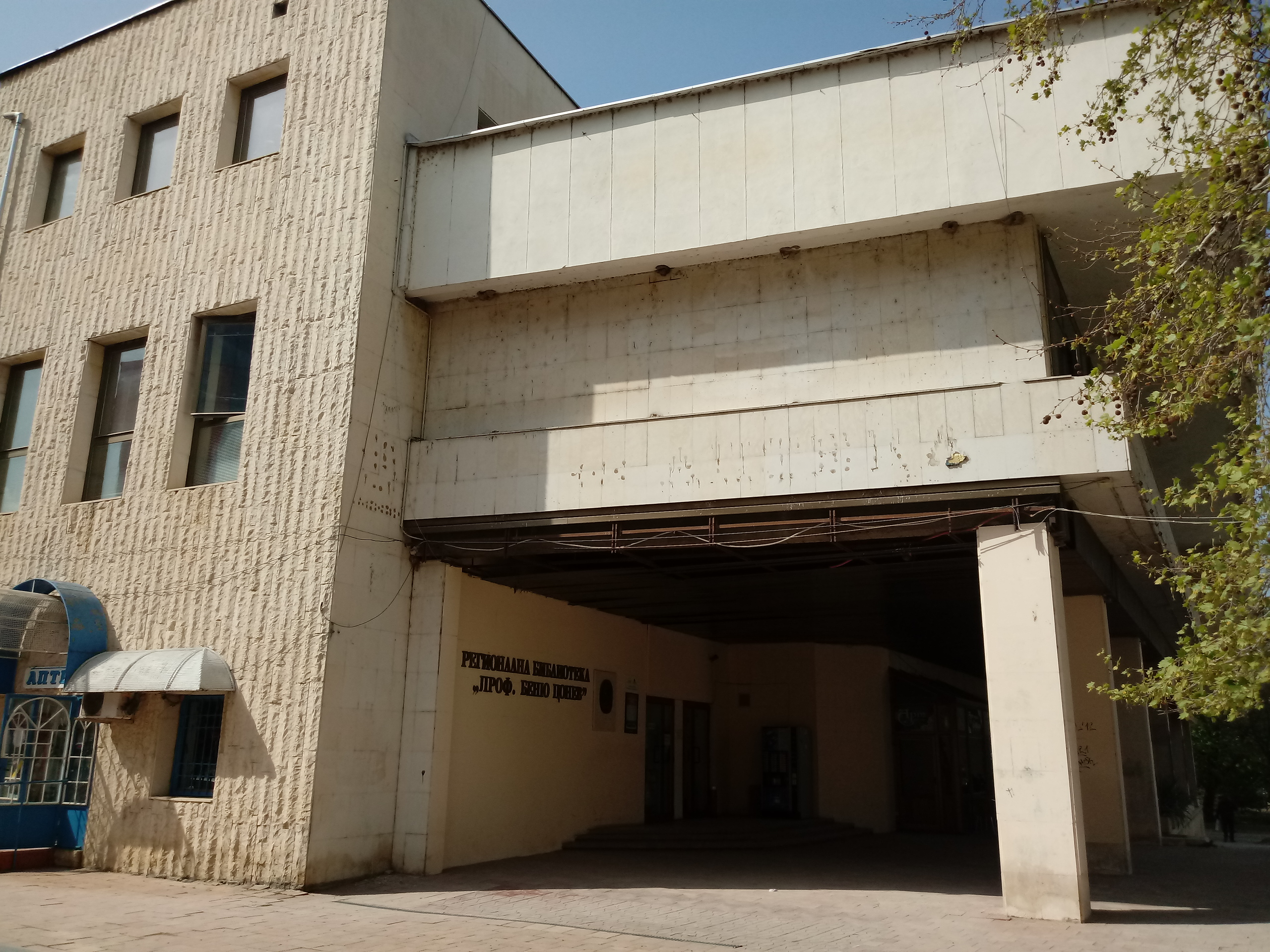
Lovech regional library exterior

- Sofia City Library
- Regional Library "Dimitar Talev" (Blagoevgrad)
- Regional Library "P. K. Yavorov" (Burgas)
- Regional Library "Dora Gabe" (Dobrich)
- Regional Library "Aprilov-Palauzov" (Gabrovo)
- Regional Library "Hristo Smirnenski" (Haskovo)
- Regional Library "Nikola Y. Vaptsarov" (Kardzhali)
- Regional Library "Emanuil Popdimitrov" (Kyustendil)
- Regional Library "Prof. Benyu Tsonev" (Lovech)*
- Regional Library "Geo Milev" (Montana)
- Regional Library "Nikola Furnadzhiev" (Pazardzhik)
- Regional Library "Ivan Vazov" (Plovdiv)
- Regional Library "Prof. Boyan Penev" (Razgrad)
- Regional Library "Lyuben Karavelov" (Rousse)
- Regional Library "Partenii Pavlovich" (Silistra)
- Regional Library "Nikolai Vranchev" (Smolyan)
- Regional Library "Zaharii Kniazheski" (Stara Zagora)
- Regional Library "Petar Stapov"(Targovishte)
- Regional Library "Stiliyan Chilingirov" (Shumen)
- Regional Library "Pencho Slaveykov" (Varna)
- Regional Library "Petko Rachev Slaveykov" (Veliko Tarnovo)
- Regional Library "Hristo Botev" (Vratsa)

== University Libraries ==
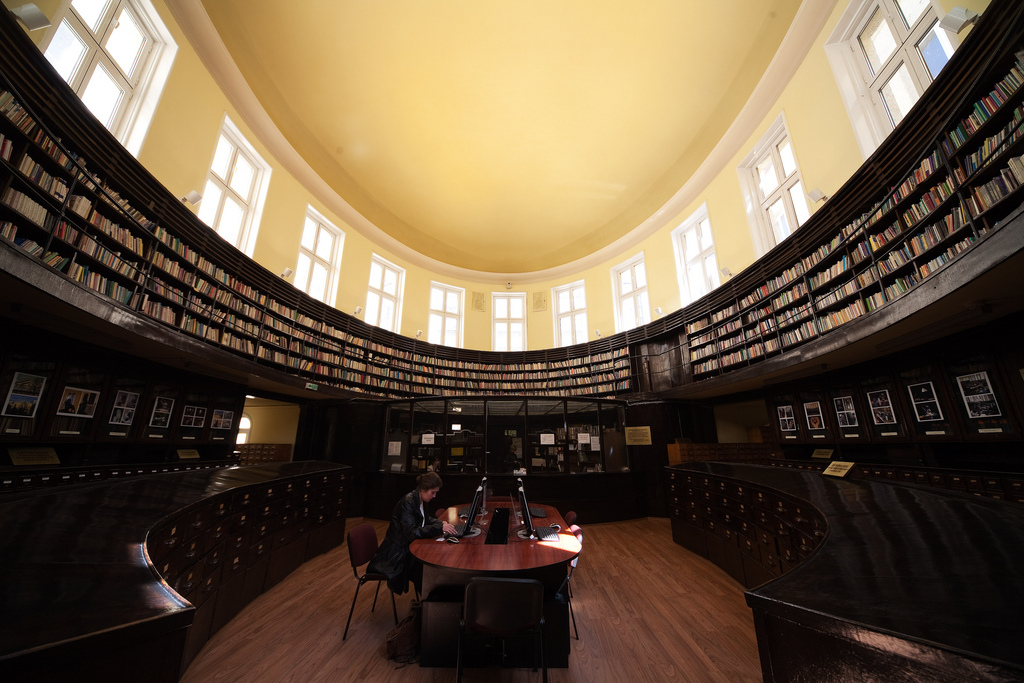
Sofia university library

- Library of American University in Bulgaria
- Library of South-West University “Neofit Rilski”
- Library of International High Business School
- Library of Burgas Free University
- Library of Varna University of Management
- Library of Technical University
- Library of Agricultural University
- Library of University of Rousse "Angel Kanchev"
- Library of the Diplomatic institute
- Library of National Academy for Theatre and Film Arts
- Library of New Bulgarian University
- Library of Sofia University "St. Kliment Ohridski"
- Library of Technical University – Sofia
- Library of University of architecture, civil engineering and geodesy
- Library of University of chemical technology and metallurgy
- Library of University of library science and information technologies
- Central Medical Library of Medical University
- Library of Shumen University "Episkop Konstantin Preslavski"
- Library of Trakia University
- Library of Academy of Economics
- Library of Varna Free University "Chernorizets Hrabar"
- Library of University of Economics
- Library of Medical University – Varna "Prof. Dr. Paraskev Stoyanov"
- Library of Veliko Tarnovo University "St. St. Cyril and Methodius"

== Chitalishte Public Libraries ==
- City Library "Paisii Hilendarski"
- Library of Chitalishte "Paisii Hilendarski – 1870"
- Library of Chitalishte "Nikola Vaptsarov"
- Library "Ivan Vazov" of Chitalishte "Hristo Botev – 1884"
- Public library "Penyo Penev"
- Library of Chitalishte
- Library of Chitalishte "Svetlina – 1896"
- Library of Chitalishte "Prosveta"
- City Library "Petia Iordanova"
- City Library "Iskra"
- Library of Chitalishte "Postoyanstvo"
- Library of Chitalishte "Dinjo Sivkov – 1870"
- City Library "Stoian Drinov"
- Library of Chitalishte "Razvitie"
- Library of Chitalishte "Georgi Tarnev"
- Library of Chitalishte "Sv. sv. Kiril i Metodii"
- Library "Tzoncho Rodev" of Chitalishte "Aleko Konstantinov – 1884"
- Library of Chitalishte "Otec Paisii – 1919"
- City Library (Sevlievo, Gabrovo Region)
- City Library (Svishtov, Veliko Tarnovo Region)
- Library of Chitalishte "Elenka i Kiril Avramovi – 1856"
- Library of Chitalishte "Gradishte – 1907"
- Library of Chitalishte "Zora"
- Library of Chitalishte "Tzar Boris III – 1928"
- National Library for the Blind "Lui Brail"
- Library of Chitalishte "Rodina"
- Library of Chitalishte "Saglasie – 1869"
- Library of Chitalishte "Prosveta – 1927"

== See also ==
- Access to public information in Bulgaria
- COBISS
