= Standart (newspaper) =

Standart (Стандарт)
- Publisher: ECRIT MEDIA Ltd
- Editor: Slavka Bozukova
- Founded: 1992
- Website: https://www.standartnews.com/

Standart (Стандарт) is a Bulgarian newspaper founded in 1992. Chairman of the board of editors is Slavka Bozukova. The online edition has an English language section.

== See also ==
- List of newspapers in Bulgaria
