= Proactive disclosure =

Proactive disclosure is the act of releasing information by a government on its own initiative without the specific data having been requested by any person, or such act by a non-government entity in compliance with a requirement imposed by a government. It is an aspect of transparency requirements toward creation of open government.

Proactive disclosure is related to but differs from reactive disclosure. Reactive disclosure, usually mandated by freedom of information law, occurs only when a request is made, while proactive disclosure occurs as a routine without the information being requested. Proactive disclosure has also been referred to as stealing thunder, active disclosure in the United States and suo moto disclosure in Latin which means upon its own initiative.

Proactive disclosure generally refers to one of two related open government practices: open data (broadly speaking) or mandatory proactive disclosure (narrower scope, mandated by sunshine law). Open data refers to a government's default practice or general policy to broadly make machine readable data within its control (subject to certain exemptions) openly available, simple to access, and convenient to reuse, and to do so as a routine business practice on an ongoing basis. In recent years this is most often carried out via an online data portal or repository operated by the government or a credible NGO like the Internet Archive. Such policies may mandate the release of a wide range of data and records generally of various subject matters or interests (including data that may be of no relevance to accountability, such as historical weather records) and may do so with or without legally requiring the release of specific data set (including those highly relevant to holding the government accountable). It may also more narrowly refer to mandatory release by law of specific data within a narrower scope by government entities and certain private entities (such as publicly traded companies). The data subject to so such mandatory proactive disclosure are usually records that would enable the public to hold the entities accountable and often of some degree of political sensitivities.

Proactive disclosure, like freedom of information, is an aspect of transparency efforts pursued in most cases by governments of liberal democracies. Unlikely freedom of information however, proactive disclosure is not the exclusive domain of liberal democracies. Some governments of illiberal and authoritarian societies also mandate proactive release of specific data that supports its policy objectives or enhances its governance authority. Depending on the scope of the mandatory release, it may form a crucial aspect of its propaganda.

== History ==
The earliest way information was disclosed was seen in ancient Greece through criers or bellmen. Criers were hired in medieval times to walk the streets and call for attention, then read out important news such as royal proclamations or local bylaws. They would also play a role in passing the information across villages. This role changed when newspapers, radios, television and the internet became innovative parts of society.

== Canada ==
Since the 1990s, open government as a general concept has gradually become a norm expected by Canadians. While the specific scope of information subject to freedom of information laws and proactive disclosure is open to continual debate, Canadians increasing take for granted that certain data would be make available to civil society, even if few Canadians actually seek access to those data themselves. Proactive disclosure is meant to provide the public information that enables them to hold the government accountable. This is especially true for governments who collect a wide range of information, some without which it would be impossible for citizens to meaningfully hold the government accountable.

In Canada, the federal (national) government and provincial governments each through legislations mandate the proactive disclosure of certain information by the government itself and entities under its jurisdiction. Provincial governments also mandate proactive disclosure of certain government by municipalities within their borders. Many larger and more robust municipal governments also have policy mandating addition disclosure. Information subject to proactive disclosure is released routinely through electronic means with the exception of information that the government is required to protect due to privacy risks. This could refer to information regarding citizens' social insurance numbers or military operations. Information that risks putting private or public good in harm's way are also exempted.

=== Federal government ===
the government has specific measures under the Treasury Board of Canada that they proactively disclose data in order to highlight transparency and allow for the board to oversee public resources in the federal government. The Canadian government has also made promises to be open by default with proactive disclosure in their Open Government Partnership (OGP) Third Action Plan. However, all information released under proactive disclosure must be held under the Access to Information Act or the Privacy Act, with any information that is normally withheld under those acts not being disclosed on the website.

Prescriptive proactive disclosure came into Canada in 2004 when it came to disclosing information on contracts over $10,000 and position reclassification, with grants and contributions being under the proactive disclosure policy since 2005. Data subject to proactive disclosure, generally financial data relating to how government officials spend money and receive money, includes

- travel and hospitality expenses by government employees,
- government procurement contracts
- civil service human resources position reclassification
- financial contribution received by political parties and candidates
- Government lobbying activities by non-governmental entities

=== Provincial governments ===
All Canadian provinces now operate online portals to make available a wide range of data on an ongoing basis. Datasets were made available as early as 2009 in Quebec and 2011 in British Columbia.

Proactive disclosure of certain data directly relevant to government financial accountability are legislatively mandated in some provinces. Ontario for example, releases the compensation data for all civil servant earning more than $100,000 annually as early as 1996, with four other provinces following in recent years (Alberta in 2014, Nova Scotia in 2016, Newfoundland and Labrador in 2022, Manitoba in 2023) (Note: British Columbia notionally requires disclosure of public sector executive compensation, but only the compensation of the five highest paid employee of each "public sector employer". Since the entire BC Public Service (with 35,000 civil servants in dozens of ministries) is considered a single employer, it faces the same disclosure requirements as a small local school board with few hundred employees or a small crown agency with a handful of employees, rendering the disclosure system mostly meaningless.). Such data includes:

- Compensation for government employees above specific threshold (usually $100,000 Canadian) or of certain ranks
- Procurement contracts
- Travel and hospitality expenses by government employees
- Gifts received by government employees above certain value
- Financial contribution to political parties (and affiliated entities), candidates for public offices or party nomination/leadership, third party engage in political advertising, candidate for municipal offices
- Certain records held by municipal governments
- Government lobbying activities by non-governmental entities

=== Municipal governments ===
Many larger municipalities with more robust local government operate data portals and made great strides toward open data. Cities from Vancouver to Toronto began introducing open data portals in 2010. While most of these initiatives focus primarily on providing raw data relating to the municipal planning and development process, some cities have made a broad range of data of public interest along the way.

== China ==
Proactive disclosure in China is largely governed by the Regulations of the People’s Republic of China on Open Government Information, which is complemented by the Interpretation on Several Issues Regarding the Application of Law in Administrative Open Government Information Cases issued by the Supreme People’s Court on 20 May 2025. According to the interpretation, people’s courts may hear administrative cases where agencies refuse to disclose government information. In such proceedings the administrative body refusing disclosure must bear the burden of proving that the refusal is lawful.

== India ==
In India, the Right to Information Act, has a clause seeking that governments and public institutions should suo moto or pro-actively share information with the public. The act visions that this pro-active disclosure clause should be implemented fully, such that citizens do not have a need to seek information by filing requests under this act. The use of internet, through the institution's web-sites for disseminating information is seen as a method of fulfilling this requirement.

== Large organizations and private companies ==
For large organizations or private companies, transparency and proactive data are often linked as this term indicates the way in which they must be proactive rather than reactive in the spreading of information. Proactive disclosure is also seen as when an organization such as a transnational corporation releases information before it is released by a third party such as the media, which takes away some of the third party's power. This practice has also often been linked to transparency within an organization. In some cases, organizations have been seen as avoiding disclosing information in this way due to negative coverage or to cover up information.

Private companies and large organizations are often held accountable through audits.
