= Meridian Match =

Sports newspaper in Bulgaria

Meridian Match is a Bulgarian daily sports newspaper, concentrating particularly on football. Meridian Match and Darik Radio are the predominant sources of sports news in Bulgaria.
