= Tema (magazine) =

Political magazine in Bulgaria (2001–2015)

- Categories: Political magazine
- Frequency: Weekly
- Publisher: United Free Media
- Founded: 2001
- First issue: September 2001
- Final issue: 31 July 2015
- Country: Bulgaria
- Language: Bulgarian

Tema (Bulgarian: Theme) was a weekly social and political magazine based in Bulgaria. It was one of the influential magazines in the country and was in circulation from 2001 to 2015.

== History and profile ==
Tema was first published in September 2001. Modeled on Time and Newsweek the magazine covered news, current affairs and investigative journalism work. The publisher was United Free Media. Its sister publication was the daily paper Преса (Bulgarian: Presa). In 2011 the Bulgarian Ministry of Transport, Information Technology and Communications issued a stamp for Tema's tenth anniversary.

Tema was closed down on 31 July 2015 due to financial problems.
