= Trulioo =

Canadian web services company

- Type: Private
- Industry: Identity and Business Verification
- Founded: 2011; Vancouver, British Columbia, Canada
- Founder: Stephen Ufford; Tanis Jorge
- Headquarters: Vancouver, British Columbia, Canada
- Area served: Worldwide
- Key people: Vicky Bindra (Chief Executive Officer); Hal Lonas (Chief Technology Officer); Zac Cohen (Chief Product Officer); Craig McDonald (Chief Revenue Officer); Jana Hill (Chief People Officer); Uri Zelmanovich (Chief Financial Officer); Chad Gerhardstein (Chief Risk and Strategy Officer); Danielle Holbrook Dunn (Chief Transformation Officer)
- Products: Global Identity Verification Platform
- Services: Business Verification, Person Match, Identity Document Verification, Watchlist Screening, Fraud Intelligence
- Website: https://www.trulioo.com/

Trulioo is a Canadian-based company that provides identity verification, fraud prevention and credit decisioning capabilities for both people and businesses.

== History ==
Stephen Ufford and Tanis Jorge founded Trulioo in 2011. The company raised $6 million in series A funding in 2014, led by Tenfore Holdings and with participation from BDC Capital and Blumberg Capital. That same year, Trulioo launched a platform for international identity verification.

In 2015, Trulioo raised $15 million from American Express Ventures, BDC Capital, Blumberg Capital and Tenfore Holdings. The company continued expanding globally, opening a satellite office in Dublin in 2018.

In 2019, Trulioo secured $70 million in funding, including a $60 million series C led by Goldman Sachs Growth Equity and with participation from Citi Ventures, Santander InnoVentures and earlier investors.

Trulioo reached unicorn status in 2021 following a $394 million series D funding round led by TCV, which valued the company at $1.75 billion.

In 2022, the company acquired HelloFlow, a Denmark-based no-code onboarding platform, and expanded its operations to Singapore and San Diego. In 2023, Trulioo rebranded and launched a new global identity verification platform for person and business verification.

In 2025, Vicky Bindra was appointed Chief Executive Officer.

== Customers ==
Trulioo provides identity verification services to a wide range of global enterprises across industries such as banking, payment services, online marketplaces, trading platforms, cryptocurrency, foreign exchange and wealth management.

Notable customers include J.P. Morgan Payments, EQ Bank, Nium, Mastercard, Capital.com, Airwallex, Google, WEX and Worldpay.
