= Zemia (Bulgarian newspaper) =

Zemia is a Bulgarian newspaper published by Euromedia which covers agriculture and news. The newspaper is produced Monday to Friday, with added sections on Thursday and Friday.

== History ==
The first edition of the newspaper was launched on 1951 when the newspaper was called "Za kooperativno zemedelie" (Cooperative agriculture). The first director was Kosta Andreev. From 1958 to 1990 the newspaper was called "Cooperativno selo" (Cooperative village) and since 1990 it has been called Zemia.

== Sections ==
- News in Bulgaria
- News at The World
- Economy
- Culture
- Farming
- Sport
- Interview
- Music
- View
- Directory
- Humor
- Internet

== Additional sections ==
The following additional sections appear in the Thursday and Friday editions of the newspaper.

- Trakia (Region in Bulgaria)
- Kooperacia (Farming)
- Stadion (Stadium)
- Goliamata politica (The big politics)
- Za gradinata (For the garden)

Articles about plants and flowers in your garden, pictures with gardens from all over the world.

- Kitai dnes (China today)

In this Additional it writes about the politics, the news, the new projects, the foreign relationships of China
