= Literary Club (magazine) =

- Main editor: Emilian Nikolov
- Categories: Bulgarian literature
- Circulation: Monthly
- Publisher: Society Literary Club
- Founder: Emilian Nikolov
- Founded: 1998
- Country: Bulgaria
- Language: Bulgarian
- Website: https://www.litclub.bg (Bulgarian)
- ISSN: 1313-4124

Literary Club (Bulgarian: "Литературен клуб") is a Bulgarian literary e-magazine, established in 1998. The magazine publishes literature news and criticism. Throughout the years, the magazine has presented numerous competitions, such as:

- 2000 - Short story competition dedicated to the 120th anniversary of Bulgarian writer Yordan Yovkov's birth.
- 2001 - Short story competition dedicated to the 121st anniversary of Yordan Yovkov's birth.
- 2004 - Literary criticism competition, dedicated to the 120th anniversary of Dimo Kyorchev's birth.
- 2007 - Short story competition dedicated to the 70th anniversary of Yordan Yovkov's death.

In 2009, the Literary Club won the national prize Hristo G. Danov for contributions to Bulgarian literary culture in the category Electronic Publishing and New Technologies.
