= Nelly Ognyanova =

Bulgarian legal scholar

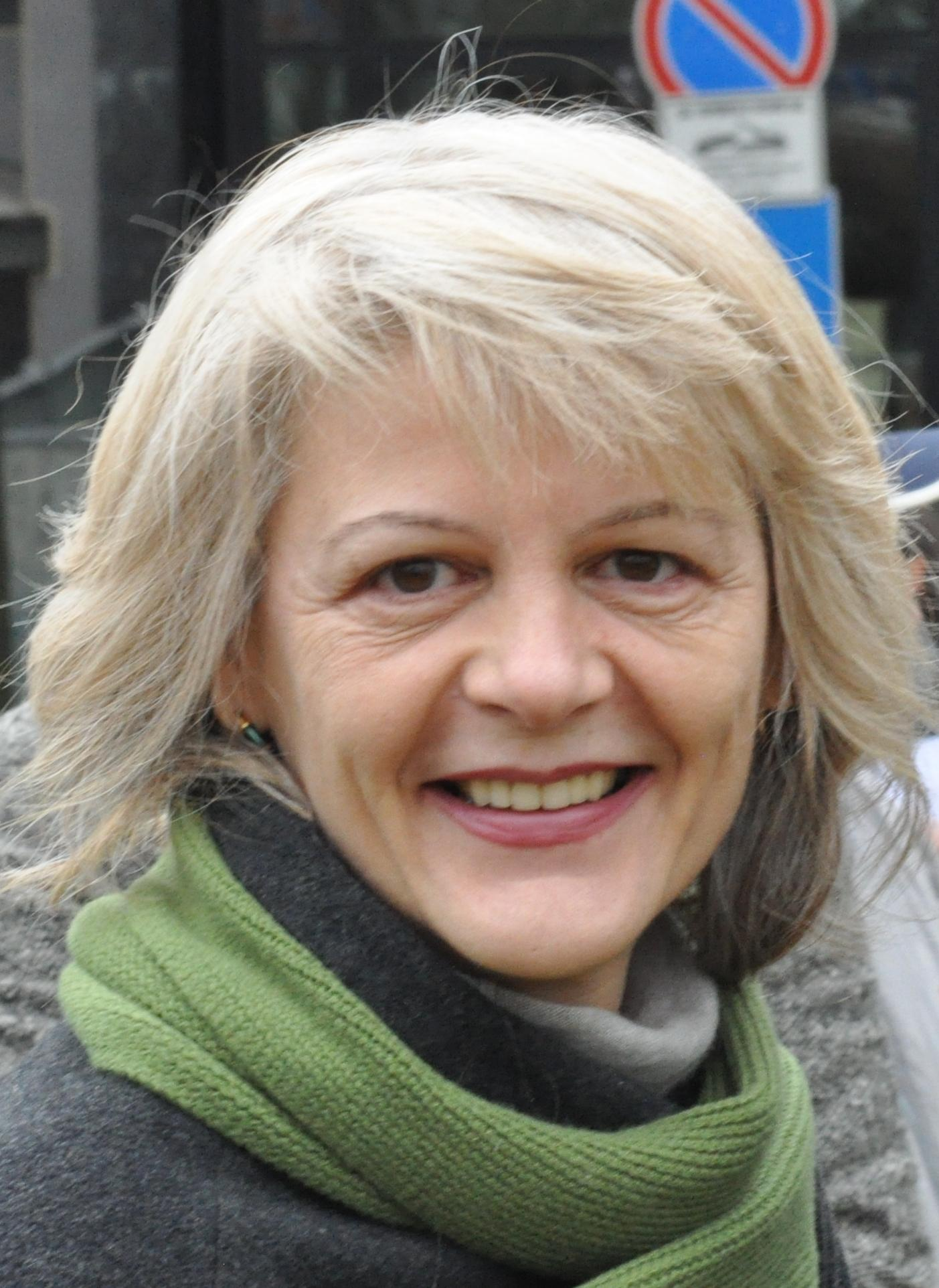
Nelly Ognyanova in 2010

Nelly Ognyanova (Bulgarian: Нели Огнянова) (born 1956) is a prominent Bulgarian media law expert, member of the Bulgarian electronic media and telecommunications regulators between 1998 and 2001. In the academic sphere, Ognyanova is Doctor in Law, Doctor Habilitatus in Political Science, Professor at Sofia University. She was head of the European Studies chair at Sofia University from its creation in 1999 till 2007.

Ognyanova founded the Bulgarian Institute for Legal Development in 1996 and headed the working group that drafted Bulgaria's National Information Society Development Strategy, adopted in 1999.
