= Information subsidy =

Provision of newsworthy information to the media

An information subsidy is the provision of ready-to-use newsworthy information to the news media by various sources interested in gaining access to media time and space. Typical forms of information subsidies include press releases, as well as press seminars and conferences.

This information represents a subsidy to the media, since it lowers the cost of news-gathering. Out of the various alternatives available to the media to collect information —investigative work, informal channels and routine sources—, the latter channel is the cheapest to monitor and maintain. Relying on information provided by external sources can thus relieve the economic burden and shorten the time to publication, especially when the information is presented in a format (such as an inverted pyramid) and style that can be easily incorporated in news.

On the other hand, critics argue that subsidies have the potential to skew the process of news selection by leading journalists to pick stories based on criteria other than their inherent importance and newsworthiness. The content of the coverage, critics contend, is also likely to be influenced, since the subsidised materials are usually biased in favour of the source organisation. From the source's point of view, the ideal goal is to have the news media view reflect as closely as possible their own.
