= Trud (Bulgarian newspaper) =

Bulgarian newspaper

Trud (Bulgarian: Труд, English: Labor), is a Bulgarian tabloid daily newspaper. The newspaper's first issue came out on 1 March 1936, making it one of the oldest Bulgarian newspapers still in existence. From 3 January 1994 to 31 December 2008 it was known as Dneven Trud (Дневен Труд, Daily Labor).

== History ==
The first issue of the newspaper came on 1 March 1936 and it was the first weekly newspaper in Bulgaria. It was delivered only to the big towns Sofia, Plovdiv, Varna in the first year. From 20 October 1944, the name of the newspaper was changed to "Flag of the Labor". On 15 September 1946, the newspaper took back its name. From 3 January 1994, it became an independent Bulgarian newspaper. Trud was a syndicate organ until 1992 when it became a private-owned daily. Its editor-in-chief is Tosho Toshev. The owner of Trud which is published in tabloid format is WAZ.

In 2001, Trud had a circulation of 300,000 copies, making it the largest-circulation newspaper in Bulgaria at the time.
