= Beneficial ownership =

Legal term

In domestic and international commercial law, a beneficial owner is a natural person (or persons) who ultimately owns or controls an interest in a legal entity or arrangement, such as a company, trust, or foundation. Legal owners (i.e. owners of record), commonly described as registered owners, may hold those interests as beneficial owners or for the benefit of someone else, in which case they may be described as nominees.

Beneficial owners hold specific property rights (use and title) in equity that belong to them, even though legal title to the property belongs to another person. A beneficial owner is subject to a state's statutory laws regulating interest or title transfers. This situation commonly occurs when the person who holds the legal title to a property or asset is considered to have inherent responsibilities, similar to those of a trustee, toward the individual who benefits from the property. A common example of a beneficial owner is the true owner of funds held by a nominee bank.

== Definition ==
In March 2019, an Inter-American Development Bank (IADB) report defined beneficial owners as "always natural persons who ultimately own or control a legal entity or arrangement, such as a company, a trust, a foundation, etc." According to the United States' Securities Exchange Act, a beneficial owner of a security includes any person who, directly or indirectly, has or shares voting or investment power.

The terms 'ultimately owns or controls' and 'ultimate effective control' refer to situations in which ownership or control is exercised through a chain of ownership or by means of control other than direct control. The Financial Action Task Force (FATF) recommendations are recognized as the global anti-money laundering (AML) and counter-terrorism financing (CTF) standard.

According to the identity verification service Trulioo, the process of identifying ultimate beneficial owners (UBOs) includes: acquiring and verifying accurate company information; determining ownership structures and percentages; identifying beneficial owners to determine if they meet the criteria for UBO reporting; and performing AML and know your customer (KYC) checks for all individuals determined to be a UBO.

A trustee or executor is not normally a beneficial owner of the assets of a trust or estate.

== International standards ==
Determining beneficial ownership information is a requirement of the 4th AML Directive in Europe and was required to be implemented by EU member states by June 2017. In the US, similar beneficial ownership disclosures are a part of the FinCEN Customer Due Diligence Final Rule beginning May 2018.

The Beneficial Ownership Data Standard (BODS) has been developed to serve as a conceptual and practical framework for collecting and publishing beneficial ownership data, and enabling the resulting data to be interoperable, more easily reused, and higher quality. A beneficial owner of a Company must be an individual at all times. BODS provides a specification for modelling and publishing information on the beneficial ownership and control of companies. It was created by OpenOwnership, and is provided under an open license for re-use. OpenOwnership is supporting the development of the standard; however, the standard retains its own independent governance through the working group of international experts.

=== Financial Action Task Force on Money Laundering ===
The Financial Action Task Force on Money Laundering (FATF), an independent inter-governmental body that develops and promotes policies to protect the global financial system against money laundering and terrorist financing, was established in 1989, and sets international standards related to beneficial ownership, including the definition of beneficial ownership, which it defines as the natural person(s) who ultimately owns or controls a legal entity and/or the natural person on whose behalf a transaction is being conducted. It also includes those persons who exercise ultimate effective control over a legal person or arrangement.

Since 2000, FATF has compiled and maintained a "blacklist" of non-cooperative countries or territories.

== OECD's "Ownership and Control of Ships" ==
According to a December 2003 report from the Organisation for Economic Co-operation and Development (OECD), entitled "Ownership and Control of Ships," corporate structures are often multi-layered, spread across numerous jurisdictions, and make the beneficial owner "almost impenetrable" to law enforcement officials and taxation. The OECD's Maritime Transport Committee Secretariat initiated an investigation at its January 2003 meeting. The report concludes that "regardless of the reasons why the cloak of anonymity is made available, if it is provided it will also assist those who may wish to remain hidden because they engage in illegal or criminal activities, including terrorists." The OECD report concludes that the use of bearer shares is "perhaps the single most important (and perhaps the most widely used) mechanism" to protect the anonymity of a ship's beneficial owner. Physically possessing a bearer share accords ownership of the corporation. There is no requirement for reporting the transfer of bearer shares, and not every jurisdiction requires that their serial numbers even be recorded.

Two similar techniques to provide anonymity for a ship's beneficial owner are "nominee shareholders" and "nominee directors".

The 2003 OECD report said that, in some jurisdictions that require shareholder identities to be reported, a loophole may exist where the beneficial owner may appoint a nominee to be the shareholder, and that nominee cannot legally be compelled to reveal the identity of the beneficial owner.

The 2009 OECD report said that, all corporations are required to have at least one director, but many jurisdictions allow this to be a nominee director. A nominee director's name would appear on all corporate paperwork in place of the beneficial owners, and like nominee shareholders, few jurisdictions can compel a nominee director to divulge the identity of beneficial owners. A further hurdle is that some jurisdictions allow a corporation to be named as a director.

The 2003 report clarified that a ship's beneficial owner is legally and financially responsible for the ship and its activities. For any of a number of reasons, some justifiable and some suspicious, shipowners who wish to conceal their ownership may use a number of strategies to achieve that goal.

The OECD's 2011 "Board Practices: Incentives and Governing Risks" report cited both the Financial Reporting Council's (FRC) 2009 review and the Walker review of the "governance of banks and other financial institutions" which had "found that there were significant concerns about the quantity and effectiveness of engagement between institutional investors and boards of listed companies" and that there was a "need for better engagement between fund managers acting on behalf of their clients as beneficial owners, and the boards of investee companies". At that time these reports had "recommended that the FRC ratify a 'Stewardship Code' based on the Code on the Responsibilities of Institutional Investors, prepared by the Institutional Shareholders' Committee."

== Major violations ==
According to a 23 February 2018 article in The Diplomat, in the Ablyazov Affair, involving the ex-Kazakh minister Mukhtar Ablyazov, beneficial ownership was used to fraudulently move $6 billion from Kazakhstan's BTA Bank in what is the largest case of financial fraud in history.

== By country ==
=== Azerbaijan ===
Azerbaijan introduced the concept of beneficial ownership and filing requirements via amending the Law on the Registration of Legal Entities on 15 May 2025. Under this law, a Beneficial owner is defined as a natural person (or persons) who ultimately exercises control over a legal entity or a foreign legal entity, or who is the actual owner of a legal entity or foreign legal entity and/or on whose behalf transactions are carried out and/or contracts are concluded, and who ultimately exercises effective control over a legal entity or a foreign legal entity.

The identification of their beneficial owners by legal entities that have passed state registration by 15 May 2025, as well as the beneficial owners of a foreign legal entity by a representative office and branch of a foreign legal entity and the submission of information and documents to the state register of legal entities in accordance with the Law of the Republic of Azerbaijan "On State Registration and State Register of Legal Entities", is ensured by the following stages:

- for large business entities until 31 December 2025;
- for medium-sized business entities until 30 June 2026;
- for small business entities until 31 December 2026;
- for micro-business entities until 31 December 2027;
- for non-governmental organizations and religious institutions until 30 June 2026.

=== Canada ===
The Canadian federal Department of Finance—Finance Canada (FC)—February 2018 discussion paper, "Reviewing Canada's Anti-Money Laundering and Anti-Terrorist Financing Regime", was prepared in preparation for the FC's legislative Parliamentary Review of the Proceeds of Crime (Money Laundering) and Terrorist Financing Act (PCMLTFA), which is the federal legal framework for regulating AML/ATF. The February paper called for stakeholders' views on how to improve the Canadian Anti-Money Laundering (AML) and Anti-Terrorist Financing regime. FC requested input on "corporate ownership transparency and mechanisms" that would "improve timely access to beneficial ownership information by authorities while maintaining the ease of doing business in Canada." The resulting November 2018 Standing Committee on Finance report recommended the creation of a "pan-Canadian beneficial ownership registry for all legal persons and entities, including trusts, who have significant control which is defined as those having at least 25% of total share ownership or voting rights" that would "include details such as names, addresses, dates of birth and nationalities of individuals with significant control". While the registry "should not be publicly accessible", it could be "accessed by certain law enforcement authorities", the Canada Revenue Agency, Canadian Border Services Agency, FINTRAC, "authorized reporting entities and other public authorities".

The Innovation, Science and Economic Development Canada report of 13 February 2020, entitled "Strengthening Corporate Beneficial Ownership Transparency in Canada", said that the 2016 Panama Papers and Bahamas Leaks and the 2017 Paradise Papers highlighted the "scale and ease of use of corporations and other legal entities to evade or avoid taxes and facilitate criminal activities such as money laundering, terrorist financing, and corruption".

The Canada Business Corporations Act (CBCA) requires that certain corporations collect information on "individuals with significant control". The CBCA says that individuals with significant control refer to "anyone with direct or indirect ownership or control over a significant number of shares of a corporation (i.e., 25% of the voting rights or fair market value of the outstanding shares), or who has any direct or indirect influence that, if exercised, would result in control in fact of the corporation, among other circumstances". This is in line with "international standards governing the definition of beneficial ownership, including those set out by the Financial Action Task Force (FATF)".

=== Poland ===
In Poland, the definition of a beneficial owner (UBO) is defined in accordance with the Act of 1 March 2018, on counteracting money laundering and terrorist financing (the so-called AML Act). The Act defines a beneficial owner as any natural person who directly or indirectly controls an entity through powers resulting from legal or factual circumstances that enable them to exercise decisive influence over the activities or actions of the client, or any natural person on whose behalf business relations are established or an occasional transaction is carried out. In addition, the AML Act introduces a definition of UBO covering both general criteria (actual or legal control) and specific criteria (capital share, voting rights, domination by other entities). Under this Act, a publicly accessible, free Central Register of Beneficial Owners (Centralny Rejestr Beneficjentów Rzeczywistych) was established, operating since 13 October 2019, to which the data of beneficial owners of commercial companies must be reported.

=== United Arab Emirates ===
After international pressure to practice financial transparency increased, the UAE government announced the introduction of the Ultimate Beneficial Ownership or UBO law. Under the law, the UBO holding 25% of the company's ownership and voting rights at the firm with the permission to appoint or dismiss directors is reported in case of violation of rules. Since then the emirates' lack of a central register for all its financial activities and a weak regulation has, according to critics, made the Gulf nation turn into a safe haven for illicit financial activities. The UAE has been named in several investigative reports such as FinCEN Files and Luanda Leaks by ICIJ or the International Consortium of Investigative Journalists.

Advocates question the success of introducing the new rule of reporting a company's UBO, as they do not consider it to be enough a parameter to monitor and curb money laundering in the UAE. However, not complying with the law, enacted from 1 July 2021, could charge the responsible company with a penalty and a fine worth 100,000 UAE dirhams.

=== United Kingdom ===
The United Kingdom defines a beneficial owner (known as a 'person with significant control') as someone who holds more than 25 per cent shares or voting rights in a company. There are several company registers of beneficial ownership. The persons with significant control (PSC) register contains the beneficial owners of UK companies and is held by Companies House. This register contains information about beneficial owners' full names, date of birth, nationality, country of birth, service address, residential address, the original date of beneficial ownership and the nature of control over the company. This is a free and open register. There is also a register of trusts, which is held by His Majesty's Revenue and Customs (HMRC) and is concerned only with trustees liable to pay UK tax. It does not feature overseas trusts and is not freely open. The UK is due to implement a register for overseas companies that own property in the UK. In October 2025, the UK Government announced that the digital filing fee for annual confirmation statements will rise from £34 to £50, from February 2026. With a view to generating extra resources to improve the quality of information contained on the UK company register and to allow for the better combatting of fraud and financial wrongdoing.

Until the electoral reforms of the late 19th century, a common electoral abuse involved so-called faggot voters, nominal owners of property who were not the beneficial owners.

=== United States ===
The United States defines beneficial ownership as the individuals who directly or indirectly own or control a legal entity, such as a corporation or LLC, and who benefit from its assets or income. The Corporate Transparency Act (CTA), enacted in January 2021, introduced new requirements for filing a Beneficial Ownership Information Report (BOIR) to enhance transparency and combat financial crimes such as money laundering and terrorism financing. Under the CTA, certain corporations, LLCs, and similar entities are required to report information about their beneficial owners to the Financial Crimes Enforcement Network (FinCEN). This information includes the full legal name, date of birth, address, and unique identification number of each beneficial owner. The CTA aims to prevent the misuse of anonymous shell companies for illicit activities by providing law enforcement and regulatory agencies with access to accurate and up-to-date beneficial ownership information. On March 2, 2025, the United States Department of the Treasury announced that it would not enforce the law in regards to domestic entities.

=== South Africa ===
South Africa defines beneficial ownership as the individuals (warm body) who, directly or indirectly, ultimately own or exercise effective control over a legal entity, such as a company or close corporation. In April 2023, the Companies and Intellectual Property Commission (CIPC) introduced new requirements for filing Beneficial Ownership (BO) information as part of annual returns, in line with amendments to the Companies Act 71 of 2008, which was introduced by the General Laws (Anti-Money Laundering and Combatting Terrorism Financing) Amendment Act, 22 of 2022 and to comply with international standards set by the Financial Action Task Force (FATF). In July 2024, the CIPC introduced a "hard stop functionality" making it mandatory to submit the Beneficial Ownership Declarations alongside their Annual Returns within 30 business days of the entities anniversary date of incorporation. A Beneficial Ownership submission requires the following supporting documentation:

- Mandate of the filer
- Securities Register
- Beneficial Interest Register (as applicable)
- Certified ID copies of the BOs and filer;
- Certified passport copies of the BOs (as applicable)
- Any other supporting document the Commission may demand.

== See also ==
- Real party in interest
