= Transparency of media ownership in Europe =

Transparency of media ownership refers to the public availability of accurate, comprehensive and up-to-date information about media ownership structures. A legal regime guaranteeing transparency of media ownership makes possible for the public as well as for media authorities to find out who effectively owns, controls and influences the media as well as media influence on political parties or state bodies.

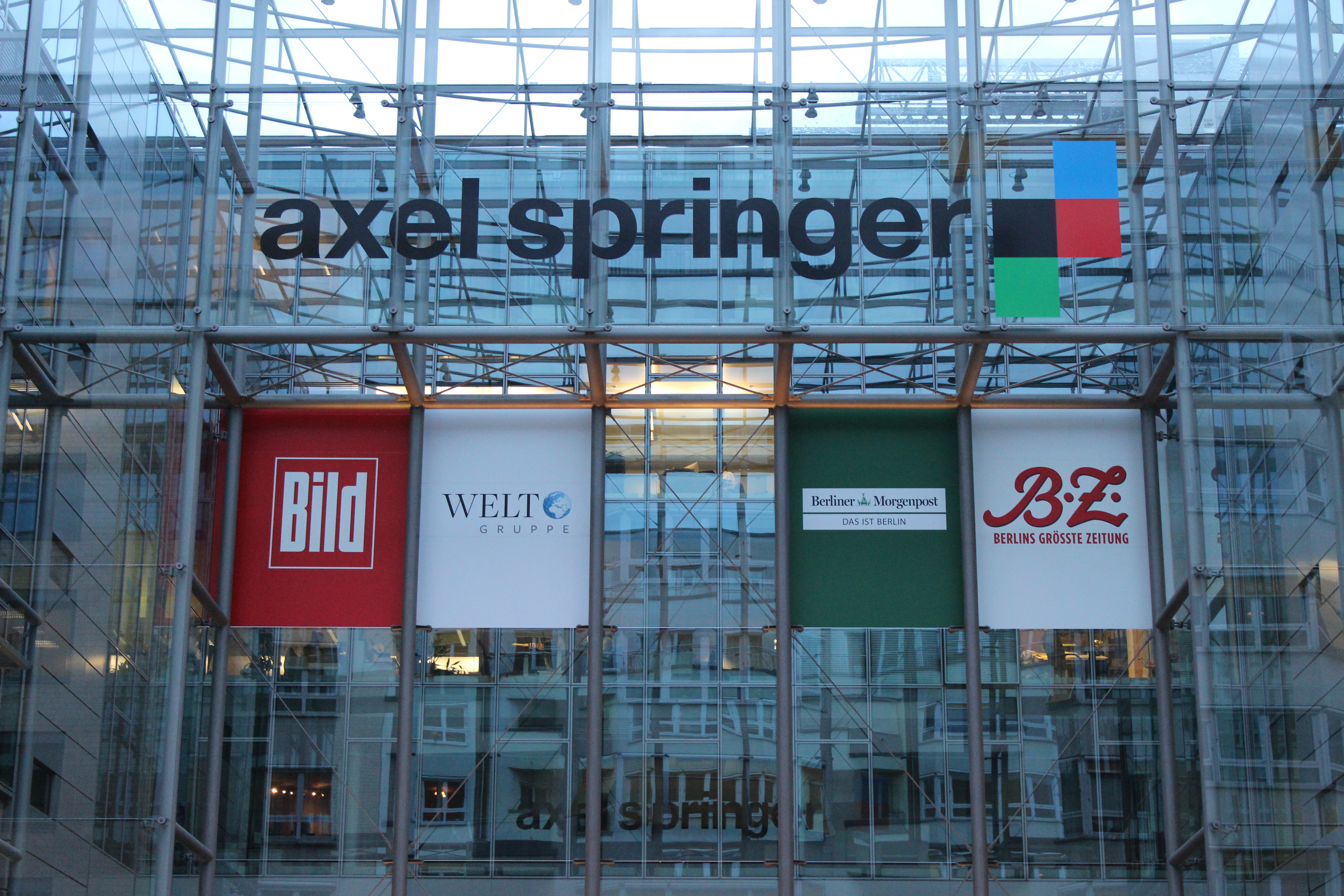
Axel Springer logo

Transparency of media ownership is an essential component of any democratic media system. Experts, European organisations and NGOs agree that transparency of media ownership is crucial for media pluralism and democracy as, for instance, it provides the knowledge to take steps to address media concentration and conflict of interests. Moreover, public knowledge of media owners' identities can prevent abuses of media power, such as corruption in the media system, opaque media privatisation, undue influences over the media, etc., and makes possible that such abuses are recognised, assessed, publicised, debated and prevented. Transparency also ensures that ordinary citizens can be informed about the identity, interests and influences behind contents and news they consume, and that media market can function on a fair basis, especially, for instance, for new entrants in the market. Moreover, transparency of media ownership facilitates the public knowledge on the media environment; makes possible a critical assessment of the contents produced and strengthens debate on the way the media system operates. The importance of transparency of media ownership for any democratic and pluralist society has been broadly recognised by the European Parliament, the European Commission's High-Level Group on Media Freedom and Pluralism and the Council of Europe. In the last years, there has been an unprecedented debate at the global level around company ownership transparency which has been addressed, for example, by the Open Government Partnership and by the G8 governments in a 2014 statement setting the principles on media ownership transparency. In 2016, following the so-called "Panama Papers" scandal, the lack of records held by the Panama-based legal firm Mossack Fonseca, transparency of company ownership gained momentum in the public debate.

To ensure that the public knows who effectively owns and influences the media, national legal frameworks should ensure the disclosure of at least the following essential basic information: name and contact details of the media outlets; constitutional documents; size of shareholdings over a given threshold; name and contact details of direct owners with a given percentage of shareholding; identity of the persons with indirect control or have a significant interest in a given media company; citizenship/residence status of individuals with at least a certain shareholding percentage; country of domicile of company with at least a given shareholding percentage. Importantly, to understand who really owns and controls a specific media outlet it is necessary to check who is beyond the official shareholdings and scrutinise indirect, controlling and beneficial ownership which refers to shares of a media company hold on behalf of another person.

To be meaningful and easily accessible by the citizens and national media authorities, this information should be updated, searchable, free and reusable.

Transparency of media ownership remains difficult to fulfill in most of European countries. While some EU member States have legislation ensuring transparency of media ownership in compliance to the best international standards, such legislation is still lacking in many member States and in some cases national legislation allows for hidden or indirect media ownership. A recent 2015 resolution by the Parliamentary Assembly of the Council of Europe, notes with concern that media outlets are frequently owned and controlled in an opaque-manner. This is due either to the lack of national transparency provisions or to non-transparent indirect or hidden ownership schemes, often linked to political, economic or religious interests and affiliations.

== Overview ==
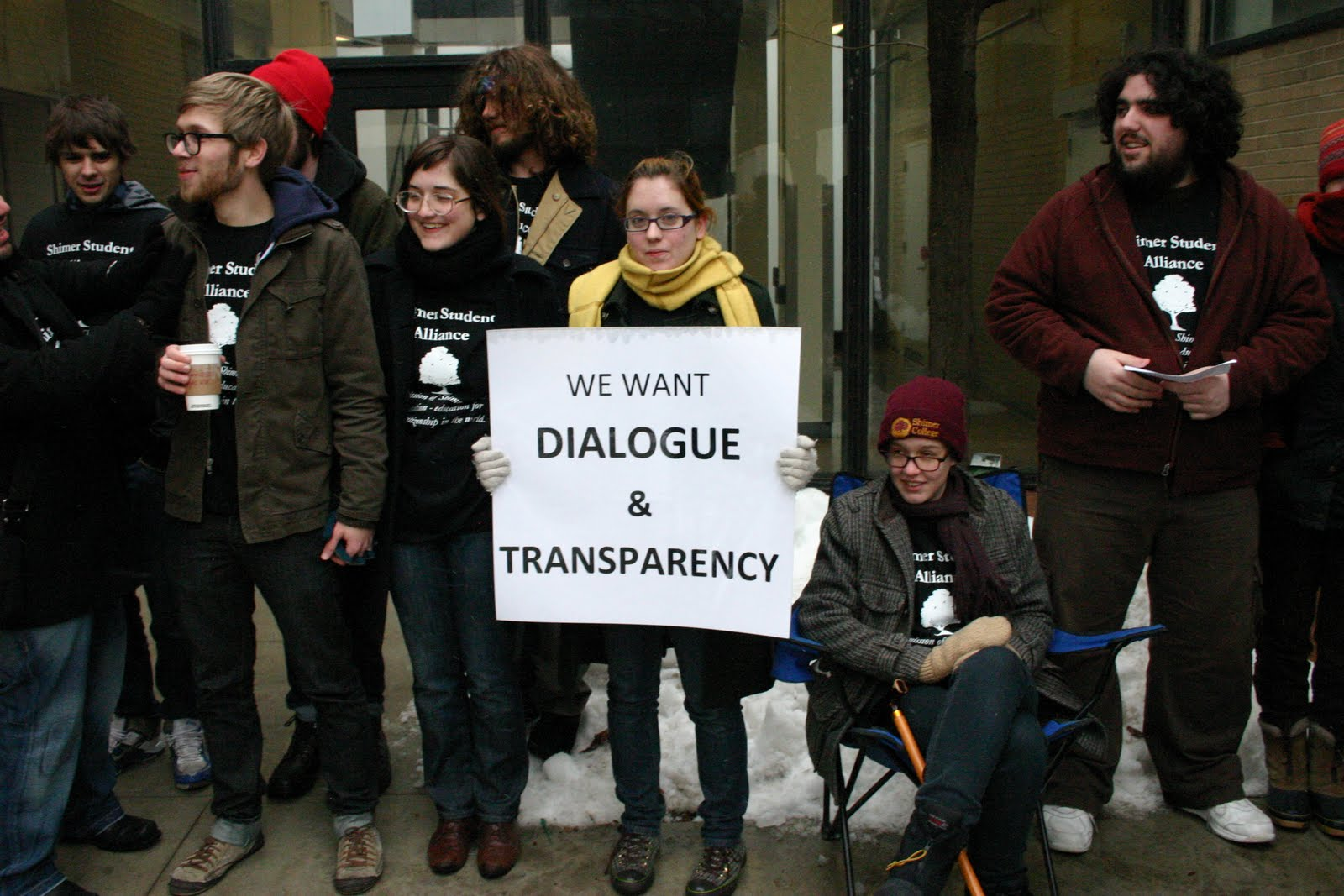
Shimer College students demonstrate in favour of transparency in school administration, 2010

Transparency of media ownership corroborates some constitutional guarantees and individual rights which are strictly related to the inclusiveness and openness of the democratic process, in particular media pluralism and Freedom of Expression. Even if media ownership transparency is not directly addressed in key international human rights charters, transparency is a basic precondition for the effective exercise of freedom of expression and the right to obtain information enshrined in Article 19 of the International Covenant on Civil and Political Rights, Article 10 of the European Convention on Human Rights (ECHR), and Article 11.1 of the EU Charter of Fundamental Rights. Indeed, access to information is crucial for the good functioning of democratic societies as it enables citizens to make informed decisions and choices on social, political, economic issues affecting personal and collective life. Specifically, transparency of media ownership contributes to make the public to establish who provides the information on which to shape personal and collective choices as, for instance, knowledge of the identity and interests of the messenger can help individuals in appraising the information spread through the media.

Guidelines and milestones on what media ownership transparency might entails can be found in non-binding Council of Europe documents, in particular on the Committee of Ministers' Recommendation R(94) 13 on Measures to Promote Media Transparency and Recommendation (2007)2 on Media Pluralism and Diversity of Media Content. According to this recommendations, to understand who and how effectively owns or control the media the public should be in the condition of accessing the following information:

- data concerning the persons or bodies participating in the structure of the media; the nature and share of such participation and, where possible, the ultimate beneficiaries of such participation;
- information on the nature and extent of the interests held by persons and bodies participating in a media structure in other media and in other economic sectors;
- information on the persons and bodies in the position to exercise a meaningful influence on the editorial policy of a given media;
- information regarding the support measures benefiting media organisations.

Another non-binding document on media ownership transparency is a 2008 Resolution from the European Parliament which encourages the "disclosure of ownership of all media outlets to help achieve greater transparency regarding the aims and background of the broadcasters and publishers".

According to experts and organisation advocating for media ownership transparency, such as Access-Info Europe, a human rights NGO dedicated to promoting the right to access to information in Europe, to understand who and how effectively owns or control the media, it is crucial that information provided to comprehend and assess media ownership structures are regularly updated, consistent and searchable. Also, citizens should be able to get information on all types of media actors in a given countries, whether print, broadcast, or online, foreign or domestic.

In Europe, transparency of media ownership is infrequently addressed directly in domestic constitutions, and even when this happens, as in the case of Italy, Romania or Turkey, constitutional provisions do not impose a specific positive obligation on the state to ensure that citizens have access to information on media ownership. The lack of ad hoc legal provisions on media ownership transparency is partially explained with the fact that often the existing laws have been established with the aim of fulfilling other regulatory objectives, such as providing information to media regulators or for company law purposes. In many European countries, freedom of information legislation provides the basis for requesting information from competent agencies and public bodies. As a consequence, often media ownership transparency aimed at fulfilling the objective of primarily informing the public on media ownership structure is therefore often a byproduct of other measures.

When assessing the state of media ownership transparency, five dimensions should be taken into account to establish who and how controls the media in a given country:

- Constitutional provisions relating to media ownership transparency;
- Media-related provisions regulating the disclosure of ownership information to public authorities;
- Media-related provisions regulating the disclosure of ownership information directly to the citizens;
- General non-media specific transparency requirements regulating disclosure rules for company ownership, such as conflict of interest rules;
- Other sources providing media ownership information.

Operationally many options are possible to guarantee the disclosure of information on media ownership. A simple approach is to call upon media outlets to publish relevant ownership information on an accessible website displayed or linked in the organisation's publications, transmissions or website. Alternatively, or in addition, an accessible, easy-to-navigate and searchable online database on transparency of media ownership can be developed by an independent body. In both cases, to be effective and functional, databases should be regularly updated. Also, to make possible comparisons across countries, a systematic approach to collect, record and share information should be set up, connections and interoperability among national databases should be pursued and shared standards for exchanging data on transparency of media ownership should be developed.

== Transparency of media ownership, media pluralism and media concentration ==
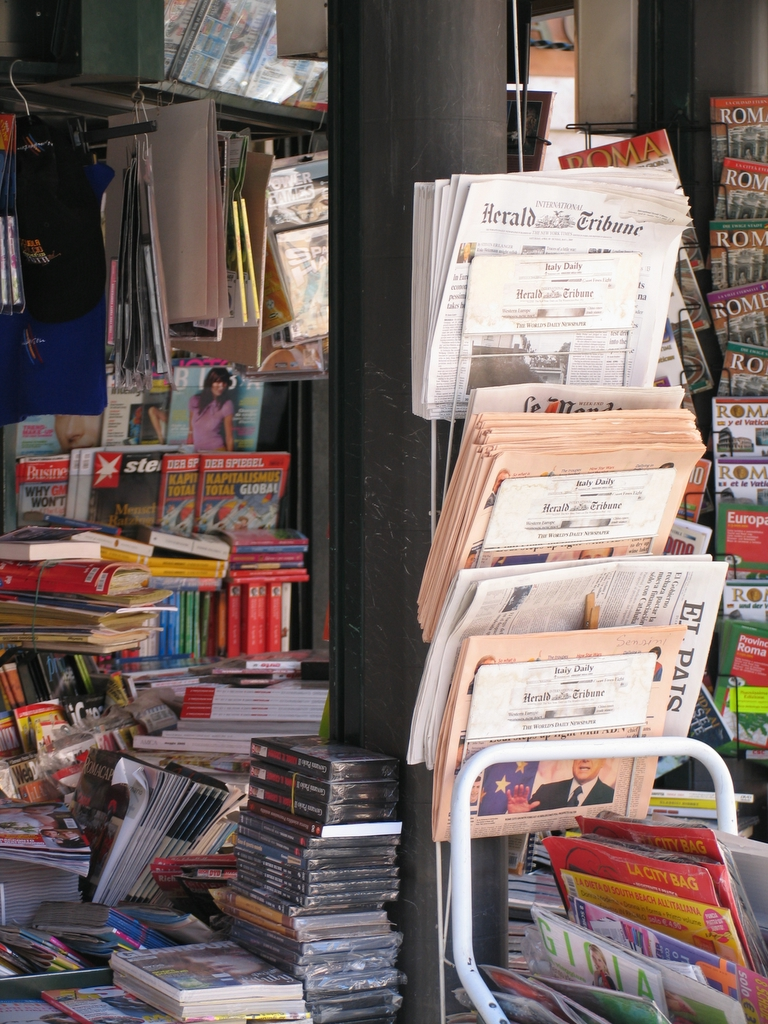
International newspapers

Transparency of media ownership is deeply interrelated with the concepts of media pluralism and media concentration and is an essential component of government obligations to guarantee a diverse and plural media environment.

Specifically, media ownership transparency is crucial for promoting media pluralism, a principle set forth in the European Convention on Human Rights (ECHR) which entails a positive obligation for the state to "put in place an appropriate legislative and administrative framework to guarantee effective pluralism". One of the way for guaranteeing media pluralism is to ensure a wide diversity of media ownership, which is a necessary but not sufficient condition for pluralism. Media ownership is also important in terms of pluralism as it might affects media outputs and contents while transparency empowers readers to detect and appraise owners influences on the media and its contents. The European Commission's study on Indicators for Media Pluralism (2009) recognises transparency of media ownership and/or control as a key indicators of media pluralism. Also, media ownership transparency is essential for preventing concentration of media power which can unduly influence public opinion and the political debate. Precisely, transparency of media ownership is a precondition for assessing levels of concentration or other dimensions of diversity in a given media system. Indeed, if readers don't know who the real owners of media companies are, it is difficult to envisage measures to address media concentrations as well as conflict of interests.

== Transparency of media ownership and beneficial ownership ==
The need to collect and make available to the public crucial information on media ownership, in particular beneficial ownership which in this context refers on shares of a media company held on behalf of another person, is frequently debated in Europe, but there are no agreed standards or binding commitments. In June 2013, governments of the G8 Group adopted the "Lough Erne Declaration" which included a commitment to make transparent the beneficial ownership of companies recognising the need to make this information available to relevant authorities to prevent misuse of companies. The declaration was followed by a November 2014 statement by G20 leaders setting the principles on media ownership transparency. In April 2016, following the lack of records held by the Panama-based legal firm Mossack Fonseca (the "Panama Papers"), the UK, Germany, France, Italy and Spain reached an agreement for easing the automatic exchange of information of beneficial ownership of companies and trusts. The five countries concerned also urged the remaining G20 countries calling for progress towards a global system for exchanging such information, to be developed, for instance, by the OECD. Even if these commitments are not specifically related to the media sector, they are important steps towards the disclosure of beneficial owners of companies, including the media ones. At the European Union level, the European Commission is working to improve the beneficial ownership provisions included in the 4th Anti-Money Laundering Directive, adopted in 2015 and currently in the process of being transposed by EU Member States into national law.

== Sources of regulation for transparency of media ownership in Europe ==
=== Transparency of media ownership and domestic constitutions ===
There is a group of three constitutional provisions that are relevant when it comes to transparency of media ownership:

- provisions which directly address media ownership transparency;
- provisions which are related to freedom of speech, and
- provisions concerning access to public information.

Constitutional provisions recognising freedom of speech and access to information are widely included in national constitutions across Europe, and, even if they are general in nature and scope, they potentially lay the ground for media ownership transparency legislation. For instance, this is the case of Norway that shaped the Norwegian Media Ownership Act on the basis of the obligations enshrined in the constitution. In addition, constitutional provisions, which vary from country to country, do not ensure transparency of media ownership as this depends on how broadly they are construed and then implemented. This is particular relevant when the constitution does not impose a positive obligation upon the state, but simply provides the option of disclosing media ownership transparency data. Constitutions, in some cases, are more focused on disclosure of information to the government or other public body than disclosure directly to the citizens. In this case, the right to access information becomes highly relevant as it is the ground for accessing media ownership data.

=== Media-related provisions regulating the disclosure of media ownership information to public authorities ===
There is a noticeable variation across Europe concerning the extent and the type of the media sectors involved (i.e. the broadcasting sector; print and online sectors) in the provisions regulating media ownership disclosure to public bodies, which in many cases is a dedicated media authority. A crucial issue for media ownership transparency is whether and how the information provided to public authorities is comprehensive, meaningful, updated and easily accessible to the wider public.

Given the variability of such provisions in Europe, and given the fact that in many countries the required data disclosure is not conceived for directly addressing media transparency, the information provided are in many cases inadequate and does not serve the objective of effectively assessing whether domestic ownership limits or prohibitions are being respected. More specifically, there are at least five reasons explaining why effective media ownership transparency is limited despite the existence of specific legislation.

First, European countries legislation is not homogeneous in requiring disclosure from all three media sectors (i.e. broadcasting; print and online). This, also, creates a patchwork of databases containing different type of information, making data comparison complicated.

Second, in Europe disclosure is often made to public media authorities, but in some cases disclosure is required to a specific ministry (such as the Ministry of Culture in Bulgaria, or the Ministry of Justice in Azerbaijan). This can be problematic because public bodies can have discretion in authorising media services, so any links between media authorities and executive branches should be carefully reviewed to ensure their independence from political power.

Third, disclosure legislation varies extensively across Europe also in terms of the type of information required to be released (e.g. details of shareholders and size of their holdings; interests of affiliated individuals; indirect interests; interests in other media companies; sources of revenues; etc.), including different thresholds and application to different media sectors.

Forth, even if media ownership transparency information released to public authorities can in principle be accessed also by the public through freedom of information legislation, in practice, however, in many cases freedom of information is not fully implemented or reliance on it may be perceived by citizens to be excessively complex and even confrontational.

Checks on the data provided and on its regular updating and accuracy, as well as sanctions for failure in reporting or updating it, can help improve the quality of recorded data, which are crucial for assessing media ownership transparency. There is great variability on these sanctions across Europe, but what is common is that sanctions are rarely implemented for a series of reasons: lack of sufficient resources; lack of expertise in the authorities that should check; an unwillingness to check organisations that might have powerful political or commercial influences, etc.

Also in terms of public accessibility there are considerable variations across Europe: for instance, countries like Norway and Germany developed good practices in terms of online, updated searchable databases. In particular, in Germany the competent media authorities release annual lists with data on national media outlets, including the participating interests, and publish such information on the website of the KEK, the independent Commission on Concentration of the Media. The KEK also publishes reports that are distributed to media, politicians, universities, libraries, etc. In turn, the public use of available databases depends not only on their effective accessibility, but also on factors such as public awareness and confidence in starting and handling requests.

In 2021, the Polish legislature attempted to pass a law that would ban companies in countries that are not EEA members from owning a piece of any Polish media company large enough for them to control the company. However, following US pressure, the bill was vetoed by President Andrej Duda. Critics have accused the Polish government of using such legislation to target an opposition outlet and to restrict free speech in the country. If it would pass, the law would allow the government to exercise a high level of control over media ownership. However, the ruling party in Poland has explained that the intention behind the law was to stop foreign autocratic influence on Polish media. Another piece of proposed legislation with a similar rationale sparked protests in Georgia in 2023. If passed, nongovernmental organizations and media outlets receiving over a fifth of their funding from without Georgia would be required to register as "agents of foreign influence". These two are examples of conflict between government regulation regarding the transparency of media ownership and funding on the one hand, and the prospect of media outlets being intimidated by the government and thereby possibly silenced, harming free speech on the other.

=== Media-related provisions regulating the disclosure of ownership information directly to the citizens ===
Disclosure of media ownership transparency information directly to the public can be implemented through public registers or by posting data on a media organisation's website. In Europe, disclosure directly to the citizens is often determined not for the sake of controlling or avoiding media concentration, but rather for consumer protection purposes, resulting in the disclosure of information that are badly suited for revealing the true state of media ownership. In addition, as in the case of disclosure to public authorities, some problems impede the full implementation of the existing rules, in particular, lack of enforcement, inadequate oversight and minimal requirements.

Overall, the different national regimes in place in Europe, do not properly perform the function of making clear to the citizens relevant data for meeting citizens' interests in media ownership transparency.

=== Non-media specific transparency requirements ===
Non media-related specific transparency rules can be found in other legislative acts, such as domestic and EU competition rules, that can indirectly strengthen media ownership transparency, or company laws that require the disclosure of shareholdings interests in private companies. However, while these rules can provide useful insights into company ownership, usually they do not provide real information on who actually owns and controls a media company, in particular beneficial ownership). This is because the primary objective of rules that are not media-specific is not media ownership transparency.

Generally, these kind of provisions require to disclose data on the name and nationality of the owner's; address; shareholdings; founding capital, etc., but the exact rules, percentages and thresholds vary from country to country. Failure to provide the requested information generally leads to fines and sanctions, and invalidation of the company registration.

Disclosure rules vary remarkably from country to country, and within each country for different types of companies. Consequently, the available data is both fragmented and incoherent, often technical in nature, thus making difficult for the public to understand and for experts to compare data across countries.

=== Other sources of information on media ownership transparency ===
Several organisations provide valuable information on media ownership to the public. For example, in Italy, the Communications Regulatory Authority (AGCOM) publishes annual reports, which are presented to the parliament, explaining market shares and the main stakeholders in the media market. In the Netherlands, the Commissariat for the Media (CvdM) publishes online an annual report with information on trends and developments in the media market, including data on ownership, market shares, media pluralism.

At the European Union level, the MAVISE database powered by the European Audiovisual Observatory provides information on television companies operating in Europe with the aim of enhancing transparency in the television sector.

In many European countries, academics, NGOs and civil society carry out research and mapping of media ownership, and publish ad hoc publications on the topic. For instance, in Spain the platform Portal de la Comunicación run by the University of Barcelona effectively monitors the media providing data and statistics to the public. Similarly, in Romania the Mediaindex, managed by the Centre for Independent Journalism, provides useful information on media ownership.

There are also cases of media company voluntarily providing information on their financial sources and ownership structure directly to the public through their websites. This is the case, for instance, of Il Fatto Quotidiano newspaper in Italy, the Guardian in the UK, and DV in Iceland.

Finally, professional and trade organisations, such as the Norwegian Press Organisations or the Swiss Press Council, establish self-regulation provisions, codes of ethics and guidelines calling for ownership transparency. However, they usually do not provide sufficient stimulus to reveal information that can be politically and commercially sensitive.

Overall, the information provided through these kind of sources and organisations, is not enough systematic or detailed for providing an adequate account of media ownership transparency.

== The European Union and media ownership transparency ==
At the EU level, the legislative competence concerning media ownership transparency is controversial. However, the European Commission has promoted a number of initiatives to improve citizens' awareness of media pluralism, such as the Media Pluralism Monitor, a monitoring tool for assessing risks and threats for media pluralism in the EU member states on the basis of a set of legal, economic and socio-cultural indicators. According to the Media Pluralism Monitor the lack of media ownership transparency is identified as a risk for media plurality. The European Commission's High Level Group on media freedom and pluralism identified “the lack of media ownership transparency” as a key recommendation in its 2013 report. Then a 2014 European Council meeting stated "transparency of media ownership and of funding sources (be) essential with a view to guaranteeing media freedom and pluralism" in guidelines issued in a 2014 Foreign Affairs Council meeting. Under the section on actions, the guidelines state that “d) Support actions by third countries to improve transparency of media ownership, the adoption of measures against media concentration and fair and transparent licensing allocation as the associated risks have grown more acute in the digital age”.

In December 2020, the European Commission adopted the European Democracy Action Plan 2, at the core of which are "media freedom and pluralism." In order to "improve the understanding and public availability of media ownership information", the Commission announced it would help finance a Media Ownership Monitoring System, setting out to create a publicly available database containing information on media ownership. The project was started in September 2021, with pilot results for the Euromedia Ownership Monitor expected in September 2022.

== See also ==
- Media freedom in the European Union
- Access to public information
- Concentration of media ownership
- Media transparency
