= List of newspapers in North Macedonia =

Below is a list of newspapers and magazines published in North Macedonia:

== Daily newspapers ==
Name	HQ	Format	Circulation	Political alignment	Ownership	Founded	Website
Nova Makedonija	Skopje	N/A	N/A	centrist	Repro Print DOOEL Skopje.	1944	novamakedonija.com.mk
Večer	Skopje	N/A	N/A	centrist	Vecer Press DOO	1963	vecer.mk
Sloboden Pečat	Skopje	N/A	N/A	centre-left, left-wing	Adria Media Balkan	2013	slobodenpecat.mk
Nezavisen Vesnik	Skopje	N/A	N/A	centre-left, left-wing	IBNA	2017	nezavisen.mk

== Weekly magazines ==
- Fokus (1995–present) politics, populism, sensationalism
- Kapital (1999–present) financial
- Makedonsko Sonce (1994–present)

== Monthly magazines ==
- Avto Plus (1993-present) automotive, motorcycling, motosport
- Ekonomija i Biznis (1998-present) financial
- Leona
- Libi (2017–present)
- Mini Libi (2017–present)
- Porta 3 (2004-present) construction, architecture, ecology
- Portret
- Premin (2001–present)
- Ubavina i Zdravje

== Quarterly ==
- Koreni (2002–present)
- Tavor (2013–present)

== Regional newspapers ==
- Bitolski Vesnik, (1964-present) (region of Bitola)
- Shtipski Glas, (region of Shtip)
- Skopsko Eho, (2016-present) (region of Skopje) (weekly free newspaper)
- Zenit, (2008–present) (region of Prilep)

== Minority language newspapers ==
- Fakti - in Albanian
- Koha - in Albanian
- Lobi - weekly in Albanian
- Nacional - weekly in Albanian

== Former ==
Daily

- Den (2012-2012)
- Dnevnik (1996-2017)
- Fokus (2011-2013)
- Kapital (????-2012)
- Makedonija Denes (1998-2007)
- Makedonski Sport (1998-2018)
- Republika (1991-1991)
- Shpic (2006-2011)
- Sport Press (2009-????)
- Utrinski Vesnik (1999-2017)
- Vest (2000-2017)
- Vreme (2003-2011)

Weekly

- Aktuel (2001-2007)
- Aktuelnosti (2002-2012) (region of Kočani)
- Delo (1993-2005)
- Denes (1997-2007)
- Ekran (1970-2008)
- Emiter (1995-2017)
- Ezerski glas (1973-1989) (region of Ohrid)
- Forum (1997-2011)
- Gragjanski (2012-2013)
- Globus (2007-2009)
- Kotelec (1979-2004)
- Kumanovski Vesnik (2001-2004)
- Kumanovski Bulevar (2002-2003) (2004) (region of Kumanovo)
- Mlad Borec (1944-1996)
- Nacional (2002-2003)
- Naroden Glas (region of Prilep)
- Nash Vesnik, (1961-2004) (region of Kumanovo)
- Nedelno Vreme
- Osten (1945-2004)
- Polog (region of Tetovo)
- Ploshtad, (2013-????) (region of Kumanovo)
- Puls (1991-2004)
- Republika (2012-2017)
- Sega
- Skok (1991-2006)
- Studentski Zbor
- Start (1999-2004)
- Vardarski Glas (region of Veles)
- Zum (2000-2004)

Twice a month

- Nash Svet (1960-1993)

Monthly

- Zhena (1990-2005)

Quarterly

- Beseda (1972-1989) (region of Kumanovo)

== See also ==
- List of newspapers
- PressOnline - online news service published in Macedonian, Albanian, and English
