= List of magazines in North Macedonia =

Magazine and Newspaper List

This is a list of magazines and newspapers published in North Macedonia.

- Avto Plus
- Den
- Dnevnik
- Doggozila Magazine
- Ekran
- Emiter
- Fokus
- Forum
- Kapital
- Makedonski Sport
- Makedonsko Sonce
- Mlad Borec
- Nash Vesnik
- Nezavisen Vesnik
- Nova Makedonija
- Osten
- Ploshtad
- Republika
- Shpic
- Sloboden Pechat
- Tea Moderna
- Utrinski vesnik
- Večer
- Vest
- Vreme
