= Capital =

Capital and its variations may refer to:

== Common uses ==
- Capital city, a municipality of primary status
  - Capital region, a metropolitan region containing the capital
  - List of national capitals
- Capital letter, an upper-case letter

== Economics and social sciences ==
- Capital (economics), the durable produced goods used for further production
- Capital (Marxism), a central concept in Marxian critique of political economy
- Economic capital
- Financial capital, an economic resource measured in terms of money
- Capital good
- Human capital
- Natural capital
- Public capital
- Social capital

== Architecture and buildings ==
- Capital (architecture), the topmost member of a column or pilaster
- The Capital (building), a commercial building in Mumbai, India
- Capital (fortification), a proportion of a bastion

== Arts, entertainment and media ==
=== Literature ===
==== Books ====
- Capital (novel), by John Lanchester, 2012
- Das Kapital ('Capital: Critique of Political Economy'), a foundational theoretical text by Karl Marx
- Capital in the Twenty-First Century by Thomas Piketty, 2013
- Capital: The Eruption of Delhi, 2014, by Rana Dasgupta

==== Periodicals ====
- Capital (French magazine), a French-language magazine
- Capital (German magazine), a German-language magazine
- Kapital (magazine), in Norway
- Capital (Bulgarian newspaper), in Bulgaria
- Kapital (newspaper), in North Macedonia
- Capital (Romanian newspaper)
- Capital (Ukrainian newspaper)
- Capital (Ethiopia), a newspaper
- A Capital, a defunct daily newspaper in Lisbon, Portugal
- Capital New York, an online news site owned by Politico
- The Capital, a daily newspaper based in Annapolis, Maryland, U.S.
- La Capital, a daily newspaper based in Rosario, Argentina
- La Capital (Mar del Plata), a daily newspaper based in Mar del Plata, Argentina
- La Capitale, a daily newspaper based in Brussels, Belgium

=== Film and television shows ===
- Capital (film) (French: Le Capital), a 2012 French drama film directed by Costa-Gavras
- Capital (British TV series), a 2015 adaptation of Lanchester's novel
- Capital (Iranian TV series), 2011–2020

=== Music ===
- Capital (album), by Mick Softley, 1976
- Capital (band), a British band
- "Capital (It Fails Us Now)", a song by Gang of Four from the 1982 album Another Day/Another Dollar

=== Television and radio stations ===
- Capital (radio network), a group of radio stations operating across the UK
  - Capital TV, a former British rolling-music TV channel
- Canal Capital, a television channel in Bogotá, Colombia
- Capital TV (Belarus), a TV channel
- Capital TV (Cardiff), a former TV channel in Wales
- CTC (TV station), formerly called Capital Television, Ten Capital and Capital 7, in Canberra, Australia
- Capital Television (New Zealand), a former television channel in Wellington, New Zealand, operated by TVNZ
- Capital TV (Nigeria), a Nigerian news channel
- Capital TV (Malaysia), a defunct Malaysian television channel
- Capital FM 88.9, a defunct Malaysian radio station
- YLE Capital FM, a defunct Finnish radio station
- DWFT, an FM radio station in Metro Manila, Philippines known as 104.3 The Capital
- Radio Capital FM 94.8, a radio station in Dhaka, Bangladesh
- Rádio Capital, a defunct Portuguese radio station

== Education ==
- Capital College (disambiguation), the name of several institutions
- Capital Community College, in Hartford, Connecticut, U.S.
- Capital University, in Bexley, Ohio, U.S.
- Capital University, Jharkhand, in India

== Places ==
- La Capital Department, Santa Fe, Argentina
- La Capital Department, San Luis, Argentina
- City of Capitals, Moscow, Russia; an office complex

== Sports ==
- Capital CF, a Brazilian football club
- Albany Capitals, an American soccer team
- Atlanta Capitals, an American ice hockey team
- Baton Rouge Capitals, an American soccer team
- Bonn Capitals, a German baseball/softball team
- Brampton Capitals, a Canadian Junior-A ice hockey team
- Bratislava Capitals, a Slovak ice hockey team
- Brisbane Capitals, an Australian basketball team
- Central Penn Capitals, an American indoor American gridiron football team based in Harrisburg, Pennsylvania
- Columbus Capitals, an American indoor soccer team
- Cowichan Valley Capitals, a Canadian junior ice hockey team
- Delhi Capitals, an Indian cricket team
- Delhi Capitals (basketball), an Indian basketball team, affiliated with the Delhi Capitals
- Delhi Capitals (WPL), an Indian women's cricket team, affiliated with the Delhi Capitals
- Dubai Capitals, an Emirati cricket team, affiliated with the Delhi Capitals
- Edinburgh Capitals, a Scottish ice hockey team
- Edmonton Capitals, a Canadian baseball team
- Indianapolis Capitals, an American ice hockey team
- Indianapolis Capitals, former name of the Cincinnati Wings, an American ice hockey team
- Ottawa Capitals, a Canadian multi-sport team sports club
- Québec Capitales, a Canadian baseball team based in Quebec City, nicknamed "The Caps"
- Quezon City Capitals, a Philippine basketball team
- Pretoria Capitals, a South African cricket team, affiliated with the Delhi Capitals
- Puerto Rico Capitals, an American women's soccer team
- Raleigh Capitals, an American minor-league baseball team
- Regina Capitals, a Canadian ice hockey team
- Rouyn-Noranda Capitales, a Canadian Junior-A ice hockey team
- Sacramento Capitals, an American tennis team
- Salem Capitals, an American basketball team
- St. John's Capitals, a Canadian senior ice hockey team
- Springfield Capitals, an American independent baseball team
- Summerside Western Capitals, a Canadian Junior-A ice hockey team
- Tallahassee Capitals, an American minor league baseball team
- Topeka Capitals (disambiguation)
- University of Canberra Capitals, an Australian women's basketball team
- Victoria Capitals, a Canadian baseball team
- Vienna Capitals, an Austrian ice-hockey team
- Walkerton Capitals, a Canadian senior ice hockey team
- Walkerton Capitals (PJHL), a Canadian junior ice hockey team
- Washington Capitals, an American ice hockey team

== Transportation and vehicular ==
- Capital (sidewheeler), a 19th-century American steamboat
- Capital Airlines (disambiguation), several uses
- Capitals Limited, a British passenger train
- Capital ship, a classification of a naval vessel

== Other uses ==
- Capitals (typeface), a serif font composed entirely of capital letters
- Gaisano Capital, a shopping mall based in the Philippines
- La Capitale (company), a financial company based in Quebec
- Studio Capitale, a post-production studio owned by Stéphane Meer
- Capital punishment, another word for "death penalty"

== See also ==
- Cap (disambiguation)
- Capitalism (disambiguation)
- Capitalization (disambiguation)
- Capital City (disambiguation)
- Capital Radio (disambiguation)
- Capital region (disambiguation)
- Old capital (disambiguation)
- Captal, a medieval feudal title in Gascony
- Category:Capital (economics)
