= Old capital =

Old Capital may refer to:

- The Old Capital (Japanese: 古都, romanized: Koto, lit. 'Ancient Capital'), 1962 Japanese novel by Yasunari Kawabata
- Ancient City (film) (Japanese: 古都, romanized: Koto, lit. 'Ancient Capital'), 1980 Japanese drama film directed by Kon Ichikawa; also known as "The Old Capital"
- The Old Capital (short stories) (Chinese: 古都, romanized: Gǔdū, lit. 'Ancient Capital'), 1996 Chinese-language Taiwanese anthology by Chu Tien-hsin

== See also ==
- Capital City (disambiguation)
- Old Capitol (disambiguation)
- Old money (disambiguation)
- Capital (disambiguation)
- Old (disambiguation)
- Old City (disambiguation)
- Ancient city (disambiguation)
