= Capital FM =

Capital FM may refer to:

== Radio stations ==
=== Europe ===
- Capital (radio network), a network of twelve UK-based music radio stations
- YLE Capital FM, a Finnish radio station

=== North America ===
- CIBX-FM, a Fredericton, New Brunswick radio station that used the "Capital FM" brand name in the 2000s and 2010s
- CKGC-FM, an Iqaluit, Nunavut radio station that uses Capital FM as a brand name
- CKRA-FM, "96.3 Capital FM", an Edmonton, Alberta radio station

=== Africa ===
- 98.4 Capital FM, a Kenyan radio station owned by Capital Group LTD
- Capital Radio 604, a former South African radio station

=== Asia ===
- Capital FM 88.9, a former radio station in Kuala Lumpur, Malaysia
- Radio Capital (Dhaka), a radio station based in Dhaka, Bangladesh
- Capital 95.8FM, a Mandarin-language radio station in Singapore
- DWFT, broadcasting as 104.3 Capital FM2, a radio station in Metro Manila, Philippines.

== See also ==
- Capital Radio (disambiguation)
