= Topeka Capitals =

Topeka Capitals may refer to:

- Topeka Capitals (baseball), a minor league baseball team in Topeka, Kansas, USA, for 1886 and 1893
- Topeka Capitals (hockey), a Tier III ice hockey team in Topeka, Kansas, USA, from 2013 to 2015

== See also ==
- The Topeka Capital-Journal, a newspaper based in Topeka, Kansas, USA
- Capital (disambiguation)
- Topeka (disambiguation)
