= Media Print Makedonija =

- Parent company: ORKA
- Status: Closed
- Founded: 2004
- Founders: WAZ Media Group
- Country of origin: Macedonia (present-day North Macedonia)
- Headquarters location: Skopje
- Key people: Srgjan Kerim
- Publication types: newspapers, magazines

MPM Media Print Makedonija was a publishing company in Macedonia that closed in 2017.

== Imprints ==
- Dnevnik
- Utrinski vesnik
- Vest
- Makedonski Sport
- Tea Moderna
- Tea Kids
- GTA
- Sport Box
