= Beseda (disambiguation) =

Beseda was a clandestine discussion circle in the Russian Empire.

Beseda may also refer to:

- Beseda (Macedonian magazine)
- Beseda (Russian magazine)
- Beseda (surname)
  - Sergey Beseda (born 1954), Russian politician
