= Fokus (disambiguation) =

Fokus is a Danish political party.

Fokus may also refer to:

- Fokus (Luxembourg), a Luxembourgish political party
- Fokus (magazine), a Swedish-language weekly news and current affairs magazine
- Fokus (newspaper), a weekly newspaper from North Macedonia
- Fokus TV, a Polish television channel
- Fokus, a Croatian political party
- Focus (Ukrainian magazine)

== See also ==
- Focus (disambiguation)
