= Emission =

Emission may refer to:

== Chemical products ==
- Emission of air pollutants, notably:
  - Flue gas, gas exiting to the atmosphere via a flue
  - Exhaust gas, flue gas generated by fuel combustion
  - Emission of greenhouse gases, which absorb and emit radiant energy within the thermal infrared range
- Emission standards, limits on pollutants that can be released into the environment
- Emissions trading, a market-based approach to pollution control

== Electromagnetic radiation ==
- Emission spectrum, the spectrum of frequencies of electromagnetic radiation generated by molecular electrons making transitions to lower energy states
- Thermal emission, electromagnetic radiation generated by the thermal motion of particles in matter
- List of light sources, including both natural and artificial processes that emit light
- Emission (radiocommunications), a radio signal (usually modulated) emitted from a radio transmitter
- Emission coefficient, a coefficient in the power output per unit time of an electromagnetic source
- Emission line, or "spectral line", a dark or bright line in an otherwise uniform and continuous spectrum
- Emission nebula, a cloud of ionized gas emitting light of various colors
- Emission theory (relativity), a competing theory for the special theory of relativity, explaining the results of the Michelson-Morley experiment
- Emission theory (vision), the proposal that visual perception is accomplished by rays of light emitted by the eyes

== Other uses ==
- Thermionic emission, the flow of charged particles from a charged metal or a charged metal oxide surface, archaically known as the Edison effect
- Field emission, the releasing of electrons from a material due to effects of a strong electrostatic field
- Ejaculation, the ejection of semen from the penis; also, specifically:
  - Nocturnal emission, ejaculation experienced during sleep
- Noise, emission
- Exhalation of air, especially in the context of musical instruments

== See also ==
- Emissions control (disambiguation)
- Emitter (disambiguation)
- Emit (disambiguation)
