= NBAS =

NBAS may refer to:

- New Balance Athletic Shoe footwear manufacturer
- Neonatal Behavioral Assessment Scale
