= Geroski =

Geroski is a surname. Notable people with the surname include:

- Branko Geroski (born 1962), Macedonian journalist and chief editor
- Paul Geroski (1952–2005), UK economist

== See also ==
- Geroskipou, a coastal village east of Paphos, Cyprus
