= Old money (disambiguation) =

Old money is "the inherited wealth of established upper-class families (i.e. gentry, patriciate)" or "a person, family, or lineage possessing inherited wealth."

- It can also refer to the pre-decimal coinage of the British Empire and also pre-euro currencies of some European Union countries.

Old Money may also refer to:

== Film and TV ==
- "Old Money" (The Simpsons), a second season episode of The Simpsons
- "Old Money" (El Tigre), an episode of the Nickelodeon animated television series El Tigre
- Old Money (play), a play by Wendy Wasserstein
- Altes Geld, an Austrian TV series whose title translates as "Old Money"

== Music ==
- Old Money (album), a 2008 record by guitarist Omar Rodríguez-López of The Mars Volta
  - "Old Money", song from above album by guitarist Omar Rodríguez-López
- "Old Money" (Lana Del Rey song) from the 2014 album Ultraviolence
- "Old Money", a song by rapper Playboi Carti from the 2018 album Die Lit

== See also ==
- New money (nouveau riche)
- New Money (disambiguation)
- Old capital (disambiguation)
