= Emit =

Emit may refer to:

- Emit, North Carolina, an unincorporated community
- Em:t Records, a British record label that specializes in ambient music
- Emmet (Cornish), Cornish derogatory slang for a tourist or newcomer
- EMIT or Enzyme multiplied immunoassay technique, a common drug test
- Emit (video game)

== See also ==
- Emitter (disambiguation)
- Emission (disambiguation)
