= Historic district =

Section of a city

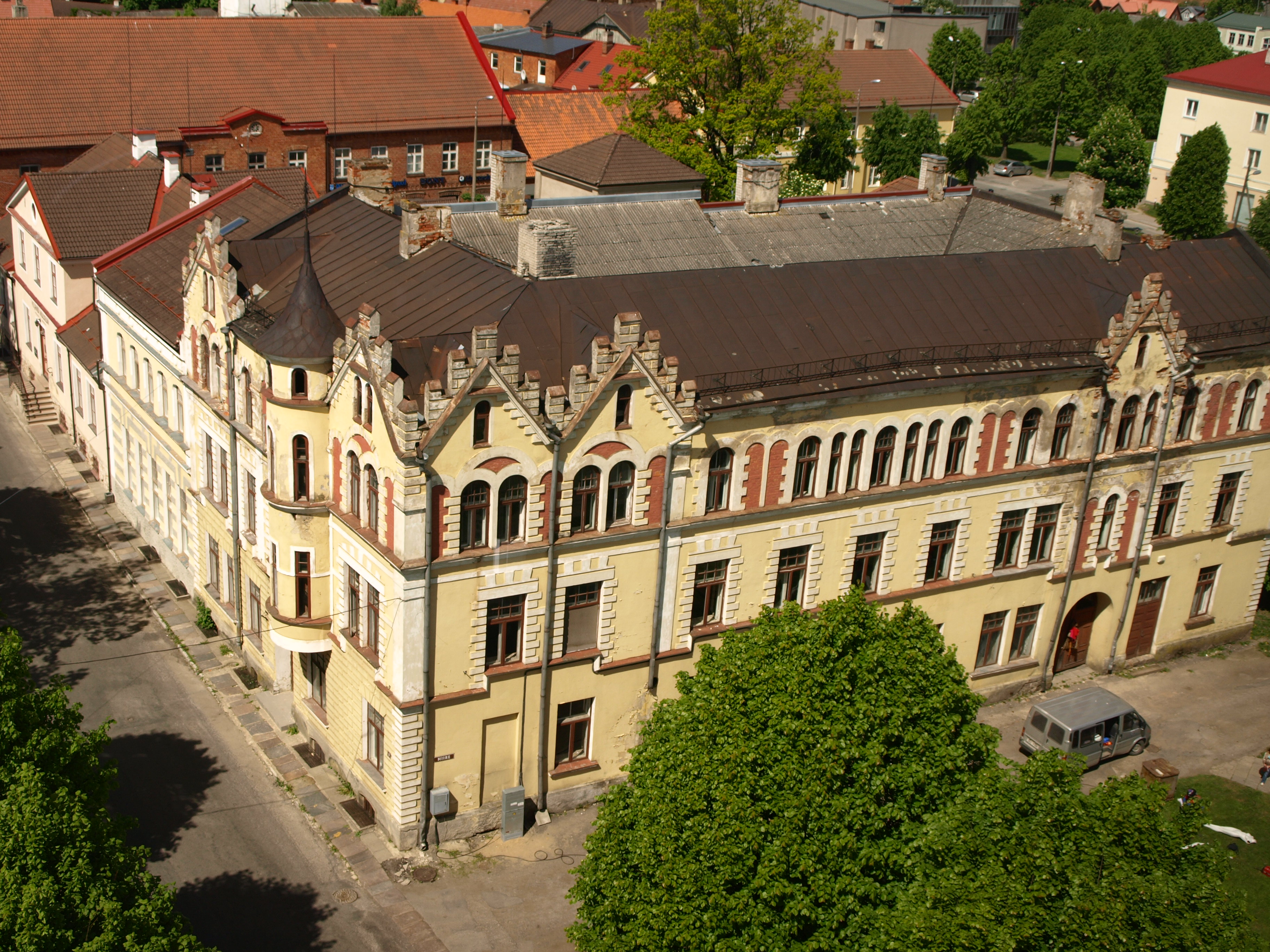
Historic district area in Viljandi, Estonia

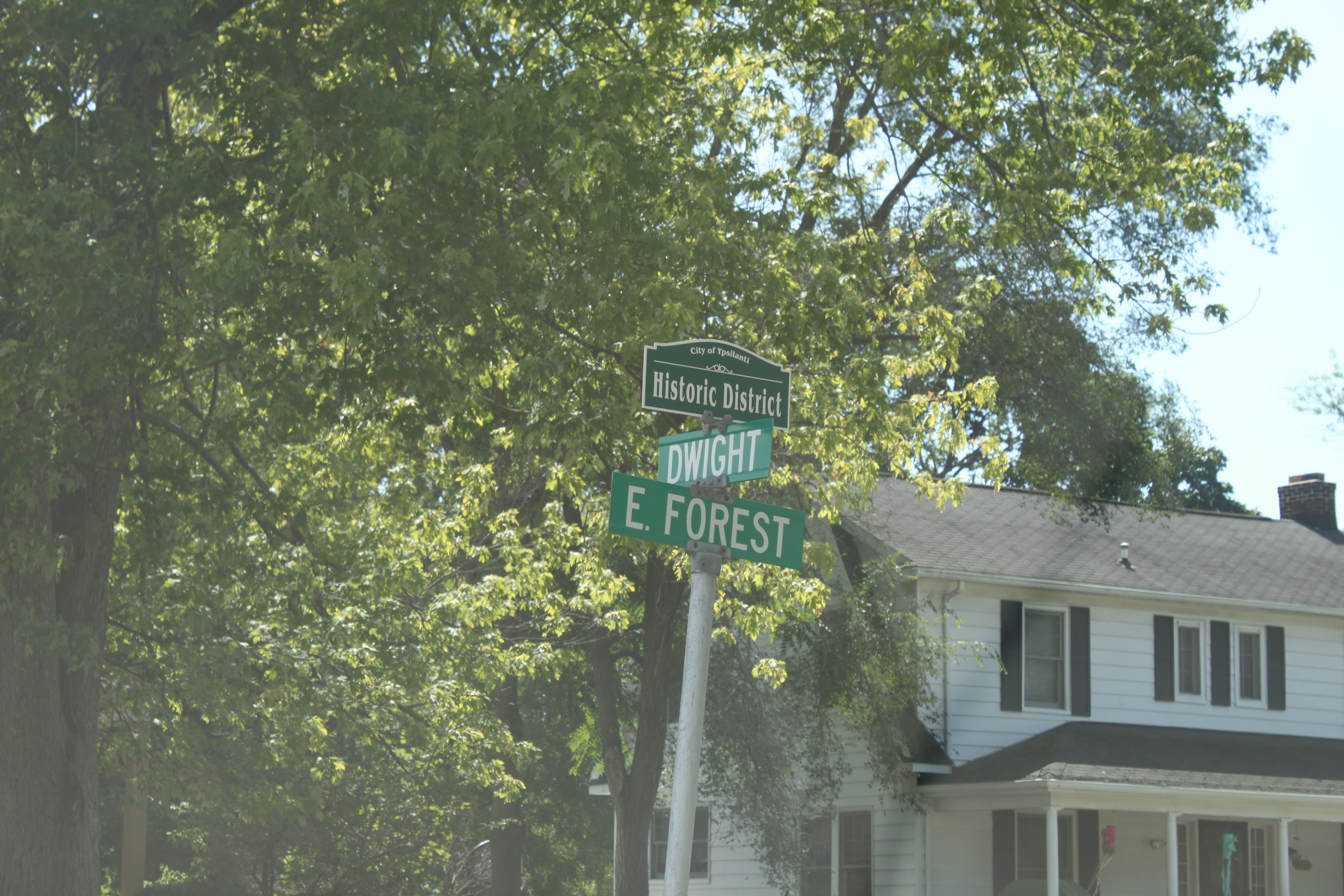
Historic district street sign in Ypsilanti, Michigan

A historic district or heritage district is a section of a city which contains older buildings considered valuable for historical or architectural reasons. In some countries or jurisdictions, historic districts receive legal protection from certain types of development.

Historic districts may or may not also be the center of the city. They may be coterminous with the commercial district, administrative district, or arts district, or separate from all of these. Historical districts are often parts of a larger urban setting, but they can also be parts or all of small towns, or a rural areas with historic agriculture-related properties, or even a physically disconnected series of related structures throughout the region.

Much criticism has arisen of historic districts and the effect protective zoning and historic designation status laws have on the housing supply. When an area of a city is designated as part of a 'historic district', new housing development is artificially restricted and the supply of new housing permanently capped in area so designated as 'historic'. Critics of historic districts argue that while these districts may offer an aesthetic or visually pleasing benefit, they increase inequality by restricting access to new and affordable housing for lower and middle class tenants and potential home owners.

== Canada ==
In Canada, such districts are called "heritage conservation districts" or "heritage conservation areas" (known as "arrondissements historiques", "secteurs de conservation du patrimoine" or "districts de conservation du patrimoine" in French) and are governed by provincial legislation.

== Taiwan ==
In Taiwan, the Cultural Heritage Preservation Act protects certain historic districts under the "groups of buildings" category. Districts are overseen by their respective municipality, city, or county governments, but can also be promoted to a "significant" status and overseen by the Ministry of Culture directly. As of July 2021, there are twenty protected districts, one of which is deemed "significant".

The term "old street" refers to a neighborhood with historic buildings. Many of these are tourist attractions and filled with hawkers catering to visitors.

== United States ==
Many jurisdictions within the United States have specific legislation identifying and giving protection to designated historic districts.

Criticism of historic districts in Chicago and elsewhere in the United States is primarily based on arguments that such laws creating such districts restrict the supply of affordable housing, and thus the result of such districts is that of enforcing caste structures and class divisions by region and segments of urban areas. Several historic districts have been proposed not for a true preservation purpose but to prevent development.

== United Kingdom ==
The term "Historic District" is not used in the United Kingdom. The equivalent urban areas are known as conservation areas.

== Iran ==
Iranian Heritage and Tourism organization has nominated and selected several cities for their valuable historical monuments and districts. Baft-e Tarikhi (In Persian: بافت تاریخی or historical texture) is the name such areas are labelled with. Naein, Isfahan and Yazd are examples of Iranian cities with historic districts.

== See also ==
- Central Business District
- Crony capitalism
- Downtown
- Historic districts in the United States
- Historic overlay district
- Historic preservation
- National Register of Historic Places
- NIMBY
- Old City (disambiguation)
- Old town
- United States Department of the Interior
