= Old Capitol =

Old Capitol may refer to:

== State and federal capitol buildings ==
- Old Capitol (Indiana)
- Old Capitol (Iowa), also known at Iowa Old Capitol Building
- Old Capitol Building (Olympia, Washington), in Olympia, Washington
- Old Brick Capitol, the temporary Capitol of the United States from 1815 to 1819 in Washington, D.C.

== Other uses ==
- Springfield Old Capitol Art Fair, Springfield, Illinois
- Old Capitol Mall, Iowa City, Iowa
- Old Capitol City Roller Derby, Iowa City, Iowa

== See also ==
- Capitol City (disambiguation)
- Old State Capitol (disambiguation)
- Old capital (disambiguation)
- Capitol (disambiguation)
- Old (disambiguation)
