= Frank Schaub =

American lawyer

Frank Layton Schaub (June 22, 1921 – February 23, 1995) was a state prosecutor in Florida. He was involved in high profile cases and was investigated for impropriety in multiple cases including that of an African American man, James Joseph Richardson, who was eventually exonerated after being convicted of killing his children in 1967 and being given a death sentence. Richardson spent more than 20 years in jail before being freed.

Schaub won a conviction against Dr. Carl Cappolino for killing his wife in 1967. F. Lee Bailey was the defense attorney.

Richardson was tried in 1968. Before a 1989 hearing, Schaub defended the prosecution of Richardson and insisted he was guilty. He attacked Richardson's character and made allegations against those assisting him. A documentary film was made about Richardson who has also been the subject of a book. He has received settlements.

In the prosecution of Frederick Charles Nowitzke, Schaub used perjured testimony and suppressed evidence. There were similar problems with the prosecution of Richardson who spent 21 years incarcerated before being exonerated. In 1993, Schaub was suspended for 30 days for prosecutorial misconduct in the Nowitzke case. He died in 1995.

Nowitzke was the step-son of pitcher Clay Carroll. He and Richardson had been convicted by juries and sentenced to death before having the rulings overturned. Nowitzke was retried, convicted, and sentenced to life in prison.
