= Rumena Bužarovska =

Macedonian writer

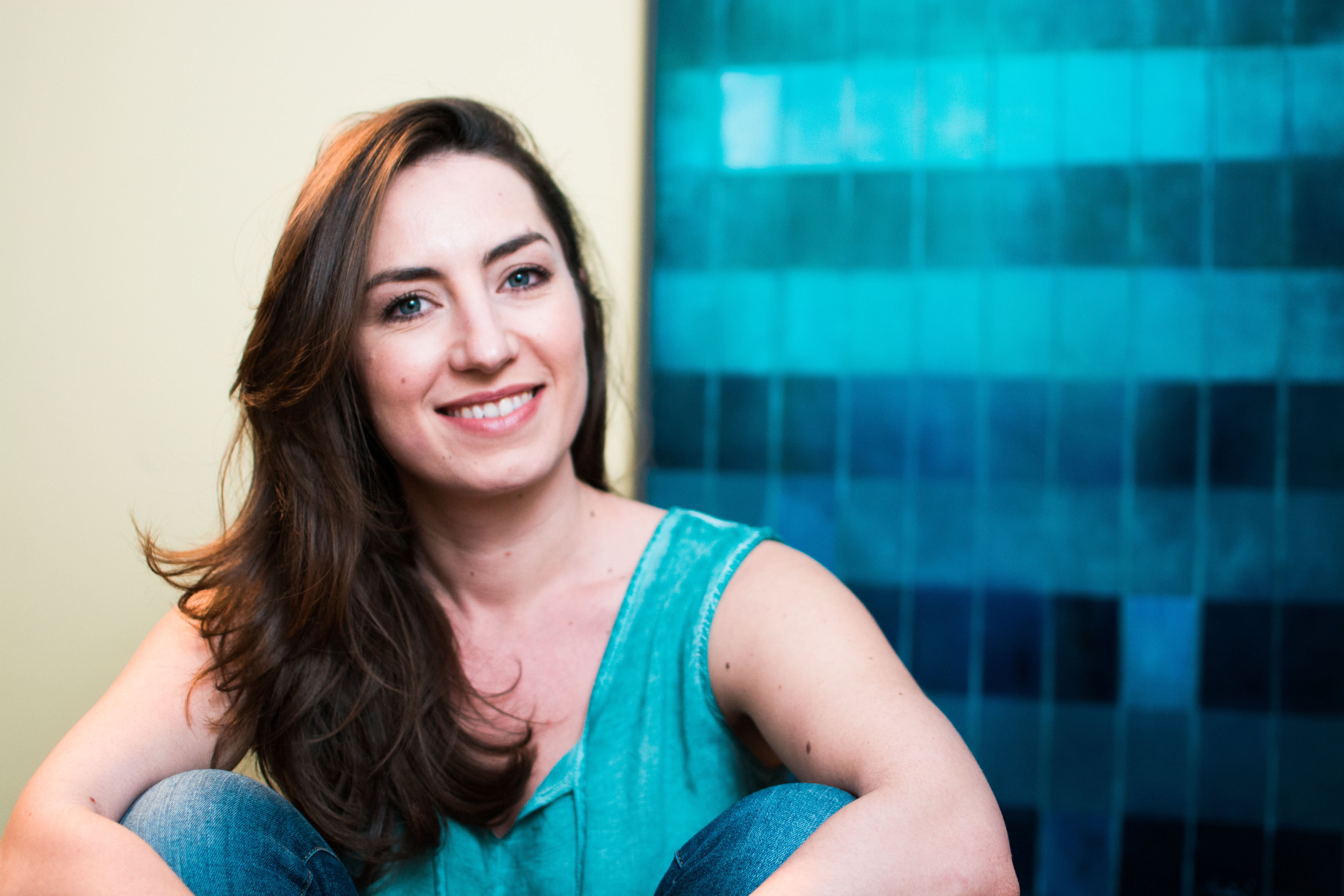
- Born: 1981 (age 44–45)
- Education: Ss. Cyril and Methodius University of Skopje
- Occupation: Writer
- Writing career
- Notable works: My Husband; I’m Not Going Anywhere; Wisdom Tooth; Scribbles

Rumena Bužarovska (Macedonian: Румена Бужаровска) is a fiction writer, literary translator, and social commentator born in 1981 in Skopje, Yugoslavia. Her book My Husband (Dalkey Archive Press) has received critical acclaim in Europe and has been adapted into several stage productions. She is a professor at Skopje University and co-runs the women's storytelling initiative PeachPreach.

== Career ==
Bužarovska has authored the short story collections Scribbles (Чкртки, Ili-ili, 2007), Wisdom Tooth (Осмица, Blesok, 2010), My Husband (Мојот маж, Ili-ili, 2014) and I’m Not Going Anywhere (Не одам никаде, Ili-ili, 2018).

She has published a study on humor in short stories (За смешното: теориите на хуморот низ призмата на расказот, Blesok, 2012) and is part of the project Journal 2020, a non-fiction book written by six authors from former Yugoslavia born after 1980, documenting the year 2020 (Dnevnik 2020, Fraktura, 2021). In 2021 she published the children's book illustrated by Jana Jakimovska What the Ladybug Saw (Што виде бубамарата?, Čudna šuma, 2021).

Bužarovska is the author of the screenplay for the short film Tina’s Problem, directed by Radovan Petrović and produced by Kino Oko in 2021.

She is the author of the radio play Nebenan for German radio WDR.

Bužarovska's books have been published and translated into English, German, French, Italian, Spanish, Greek, Serbian, Bosnian, Croatian, Slovenian, Montenegrin, Albanian and Hungarian.

Her book My Husband has been staged in the national theaters in Skopje (Dramski Teatar, dir. Nela Vitosevic), Ljubljana (SNG Drama, dir. Ivana Đilas), and Belgrade (JDP, dir. Jovana Tomić) and has been dramatized in Budapest (produced and directed by Esztella Levko and Zsuzsanna Száger).

She is a columnist for the Serbian weekly Vreme and the Macedonian newspaper Nezavisen Vesnik and has published social commentary in a selection of magazines, journals and books.

=== MeToo movement ===
Beginning with My Husband, Bužarovska's books have been involved in the creation and continuation of the Macedonian MeToo movement. The movement in North Macedonia, beginning in 2017, was spearheaded by Bužarovska and six female friends inviting 100 women to speak about their experiences of sexual harassment using the hashtag SegaKažuvam ('I speak now'; Macedonian: #СегаКажувам).

== Translations ==
Bužarovska is also a literary translator from English into Macedonian. She has translated works by Flannery O'Connor, J. M. Coetzee, Lewis Carroll, Truman Capote, Iain Reid and Richard Gwyn. She is also the co-translator (together with Steve Bradbury) of her own short story collection into English I’m Not Going Anywhere (Dalkey Archive Press, 2023).

== Awards ==
In 2016 she was named one of the New Voices from Europe by Literary Europe Live and received the regional award Edo Budiša in Croatia. She is a 2018 fellow of the International Writing Program in Iowa and a 2022 fellow of the Landys and Gyr Stiftung in Switzerland.
