= Capitalization (disambiguation) =

Capitalization is writing a word with its first letter in upper case and the remaining letters in lower case.

Capitalization may also refer to:

== Economics and finance ==
- Market capitalization, the market value of a publicly traded company's outstanding shares
- Capital (economics), durable produced goods that are in turn used as productive inputs for further production
- Capital expenditure, the money spent to buy, maintain, or improve fixed assets
- Financial capital, any economic resource measured in terms of money
- Capitalization rate

== Other uses ==
- Capitalization in caring in intimate relationships

== See also ==
- Capital (disambiguation)
- Capital requirement, the amount of capital a bank is required to have by its financial regulator
  - Capital adequacy ratio
- Capitalization table
- Capitalism
- Letter case#Capitalisation
- Rights issue
- Undercapitalization
