= James Joseph Richardson =

African-American man wrongfully convicted of mass murder (1935–2023)

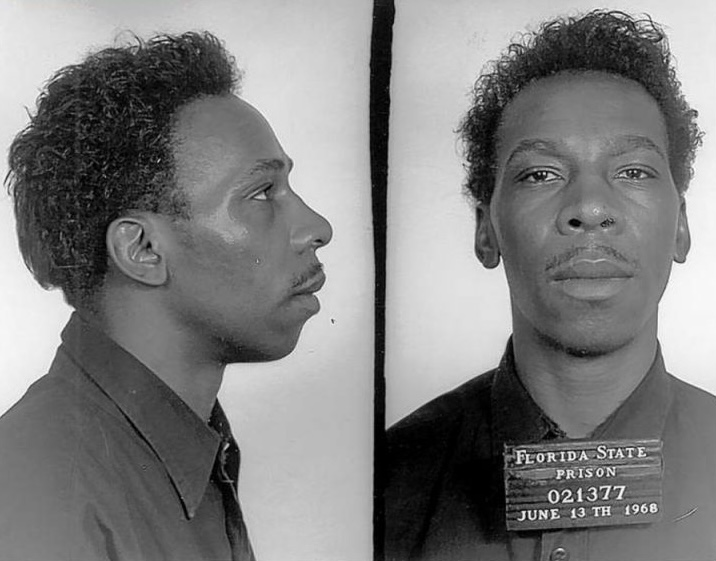
- Mugshot of Richardson after being wrongfully convicted and sentenced to death for mass murder in 1968
- Born: December 26, 1935; Jacksonville, Florida, U.S.
- Died: September 16, 2023 (aged 87); Wichita, Kansas, U.S.
- Known for: Being wrongfully convicted of mass murder
- Criminal information
- Status: Exonerated (1989); Compensation settled for $1.2 million (2016)
- Conviction: First-degree murder (overturned)
- Penalty: Death (1968); Commuted to life imprisonment without the possibility of parole for 25 years (1972)
- Spouses: Teresa Rivers; Annie Richardson (divorced)

James Joseph Richardson (December 26, 1935 – September 16, 2023) was an African-American man who was wrongfully convicted and sentenced to death in 1968 for the October 1967 mass murder of his seven children. They died after eating a poisoned breakfast containing the organic phosphate pesticide parathion. At the time of the murders, Richardson was a migrant farm worker in Arcadia, Florida living with his wife Annie Mae Richardson and their children. At a trial in Fort Myers, Florida, the jury found him guilty of murdering the children and sentenced him to death. As a result of the United States Supreme Court's 1972 Furman v. Georgia decision finding the death penalty unconstitutional, his sentence was commuted to life imprisonment. He was then exonerated in 1989 after 21 years, when his case was revisited by appointed Miami-Dade County prosecutor Janet Reno. Following Richardson's exoneration, the babysitter of the Richardson children, Bessie Reece, has been named as the key suspect. Reece died in 1992. In 2016, Richardson began receiving compensation under a state law narrowly tailored to his case.

== Deaths ==
Murders of the Richardson children
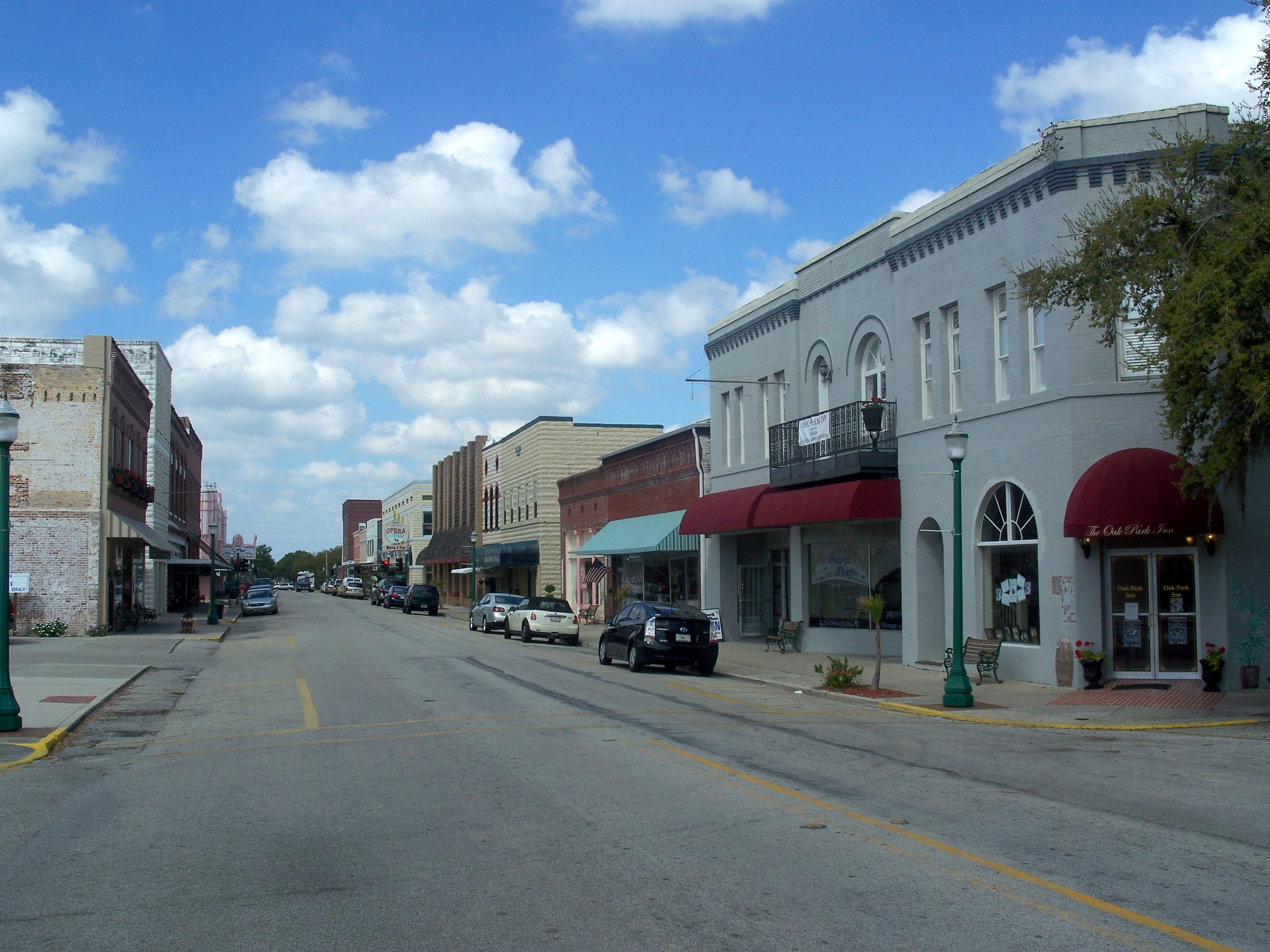
- Arcadia, Florida in 2011
- Location: Arcadia, Florida, U.S.
- Date: October 25, 1967; 59 years ago
- Target: Children of James and Annie Richardson
- Attack type: Mass murder, child murder
- Weapon: Parathion poisoning
- Deaths: 7 (Betty, aged 8 Alice, aged 7 Susie, aged 6 Dorreen, aged 5 Vanessa, aged 4 Dianne, aged 3 James Jr., aged 2)
- Perpetrator: Unknown
- Accused: Bessie Reece (died 1992)
- Convictions: James Joseph Richardson: First-degree murder (1968; overturned in 1989)
- Litigation: Compensation from the state of Florida settled for $1.2 million to James Joseph Richardson for falsely accusing him of the mass murder (2016)

On October 25, 1967, the seven Richardson children, ranging in age from two to eight, consumed food poisoned with parathion. Six of the children died that day: Betty, age 8; Alice, age 7; Susie, age 6; Dorreen, age 5; Vanessa, age 4; and James Jr., age 2. The seventh child, Dianne, age 3, died the next day. Betty and Alice were from Annie Richardson's previous marriage while James was the father of the five youngest.

The night before, Annie Mae Richardson, James' wife, had prepared a lunch of beans, rice, and grits for the children. The meal was placed in a locked refrigerator overnight. In the morning the Richardsons left to work at the orange groves 16 miles away. A neighbor, Bessie Reece, was delegated to take care of the children while their parents were at work. The oldest four were enrolled in school; they went home to eat lunch. After they returned to school that afternoon, their teachers noticed they were showing strange symptoms, and the principal immediately took them to hospital. One of the teachers went to check on the three children at home, found them to be sick as well, and they were also taken to the hospital. Word was sent to the parents that just one of their children was ill and that a parent needed to come to the hospital. Both left the groves to go to the hospital, unaware that six of their children were already dead by that time.

== Investigation and accusation ==
Joseph H. Minoughan of the Arcadia Police Department was the first officer to arrive at the hospital. Determining that all of the sick children were from the same family, he promptly went to their apartment building to search for and quarantine any potential poison. He found nothing in the apartment indicative of a poison except an insect spray, and did not believe that it could have been the cause of the children's poisoning, so he rushed back to the hospital. Arcadia Police Chief Richard Barnard and DeSoto County Sheriff Frank Cline were among the next law enforcement officers to examine the apartment. Minoughan came back from the hospital for a second examination of the apartment and found them there. Barnard and Cline went into the unlocked apartment and noticed a very strong smell, but no sign of any poison.

Cline believed that the poison might be a pesticide and went to the shed behind the apartment building to search it; he found no poison there, either. Reporters started flocking to Arcadia to cover the breaking news. Richardson and the law enforcement officers were repeatedly questioned, but did not make any preliminary statements. Frank Shaub, a prosecuting attorney in the area, did respond to reporters and gave them accounts of his investigation of the house.

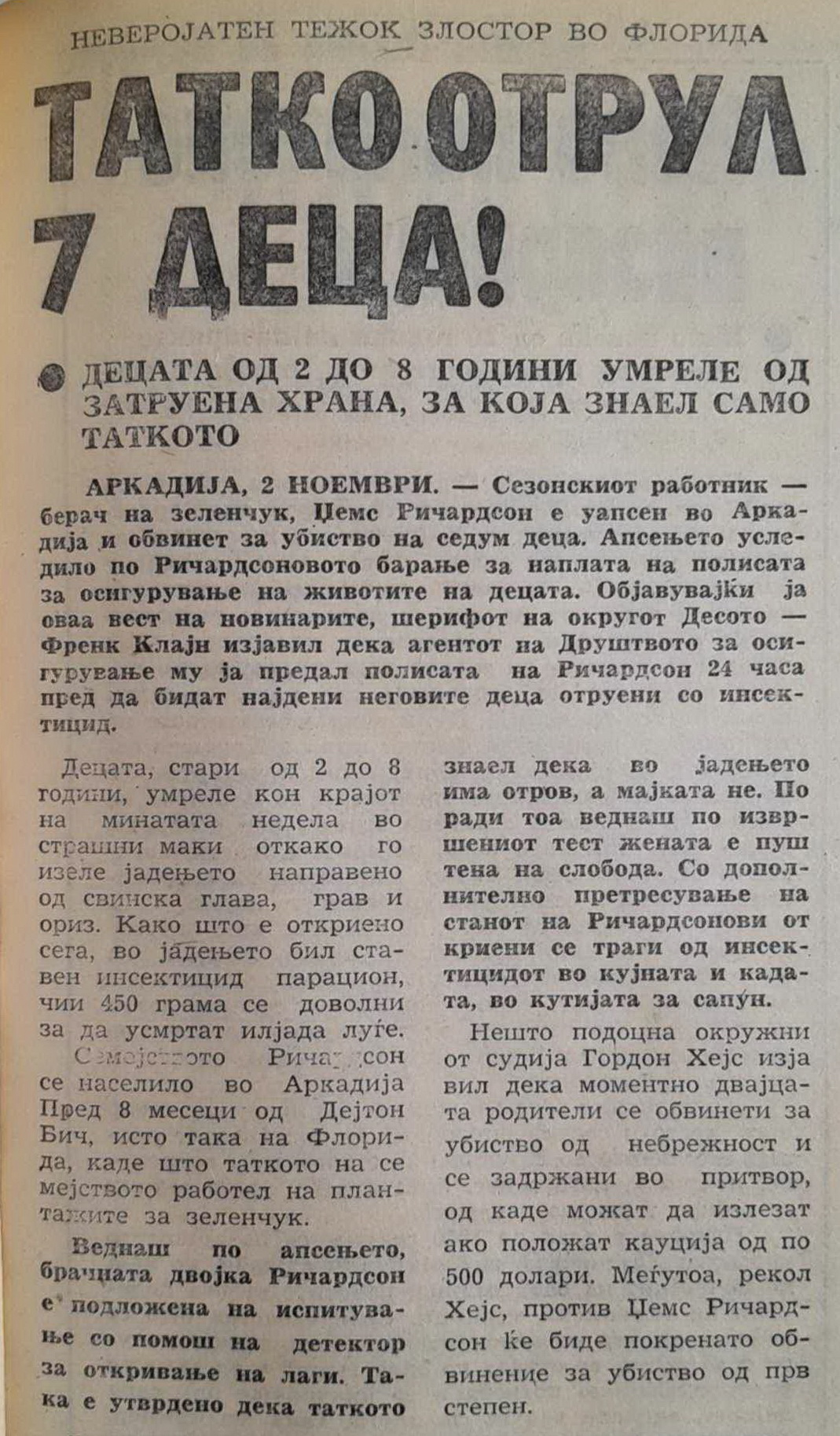
„Father poisoned 7 children" – Article in Macedonian newspaper „Вечер" (Night) from 1967

The next morning, after the death of the last child, Dianne, a two-pound sack of parathion was discovered in the shed. Cline, Barnard, their staffs, and Shaub all agreed that the bag of parathion had not been there the day before, when the premises had been searched five times. They thought that whoever had placed the parathion sack was also probably the person who had poisoned the children. Conflicting reports on how the parathion sack was found were given to law enforcement officers. Minoughan was the first officer to arrive and was told by Bessie Reece, the babysitter, that Charlie Smith, a black resident of Arcadia's Quarters, had discovered the parathion. When Minoughan asked Barnard who called in the discovery to the police station, he was informed that it was an anonymous male caller.

The next day Cline and Shaub's local assistant, John Treadwell, III, told reporters that Richardson had "discussed insurance policies for the children the night before their deaths". It was determined that the insurance salesman, George Purvis, talked to Richardson just hours before the children were poisoned. According to authorities, Richardson and Purvis gave conflicting stories on the insurance policies. No additional evidence was found for two days.

The children's funeral was held on Sunday. Both Richardson and his wife collapsed in sorrow at the service. National news magazines, television, and radio networks covered the funeral. This put Sheriff Cline at the center of nationwide attention. Barnard later told attorney Mark Lane: "Cline saw the chance to make a big name for himself. He needed to make an arrest real bad."

Two days after the funeral Cline charged Richardson with murder in the first degree. However, Police Chief Barnard said, "There just is no case against that man." Treadwell, charged with prosecuting the case if it came to trial, agreed with Barnard. The murder warrants were dropped, but both Richardsons were formally charged with child neglect. Hayes agreed with Cline and summoned a coroner's inquest "to substantiate evidence already on hand". At the press conference the next day Cline announced that Richardson had five other children who had died under mysterious circumstances in another Florida city and that his motive for this crime was to collect the insurance money on the children, which would total almost $14,000. Judge Hayes said that both Richardson and his wife had taken lie-detector tests and that the results showed that Richardson had knowledge of the poisoning, which indicated he was guilty.

The coroner's jury held a hearing on November 2, 1967, at which Judge Hayes said: "We will meet today to instruct Frank Cline to file murder charges against Richardson." This statement carried considerable weight in Arcadia, including with the hand-picked jury, because of Hayes' prominent standing in the county and the fact he had been a judge in Arcadia for more than 31 years.

== Defense ==
John S. Robinson, a 30-year-old white lawyer, became concerned over the media coverage of the Arcadia murders. He believed the case was being handled unfairly as the judge constantly claimed that Richardson was guilty. He contacted people who knew Richardson and they told him he had a reputation as a family man and they could not believe he would kill his children. Robinson then called the president of the NAACP in Florida, Joel Atkins, and convinced him that the NAACP chapter in Arcadia should ask Richardson whether he wanted to be represented by them and should give him a list of potential lawyers. Richardson decided to let the NAACP represent him and chose Robinson as his attorney.

Robinson went to talk to Richardson while he was being held in the county jail before the trial took place. Richardson was adamant that he had not killed his children, because he loved them very much. Richardson said Sheriff Cline was pushing him around, calling him a nigger, and questioning him "in a very mean way" every day. Cline had told Richardson that he would be let off easy if he confessed to the crime, but he denied that he had ever harmed any of his children. Through Ernell Washington, another prisoner, Robinson also discovered that Cline placed an eavesdropping device in Richardson's cell whenever Robinson was going in there to talk to Richardson. Robinson later found the microphone and removed it, letting Sheriff Cline know that he had found it.

Robinson filed for a writ of Habeas Corpus after examining the available evidence and finding nothing substantial that could indicate Richardson was guilty. He then contested the high bond that had been set, which started at $100,000. After negotiations, the bail was reduced to $7,500, and Robinson was able to have Richardson released on bail.

== Trial ==
Ernell Washington, James Weaver, and James Cunningham, who had all been cellmates with Richardson in the Arcadia jail, said that Richardson had admitted to them that he had killed the children. Judge Justice revoked the bail, ordered Richardson to be jailed again, and asked for a change in venue, to Fort Myers, in the next county. Attempts by Robinson to move the trial to a potentially fairer county were denied.

The trial began on Monday morning, May 27, 1968, at the Lee County Courthouse. All of the chosen jurors were white; despite numerous challenges, Robinson was unable to secure a different jury.

During the trial, the most sensational development was when Cline claimed that there was evidence that at least three of Richardson's children had been killed in another county and a further three who had become ill but had not died. Bessie Reece gave evidence that she divided up the meal into seven equal parts once the children came home from school at five minutes to twelve. Treadwell, who was conducting the examination of Reece, established that she was on parole at the time but did not ask what charge she had been convicted on; Treadwell did not want the jury to find out that she was on parole for killing her husband. No other questions about her involvement in the preparation of the food were asked. When asked about finding the sack of parathion, Reece became more specific, claiming that Charlie Smith wanted to look for the sack and went straight to the shed, pulling a board off the window and discovering the sack, implying that Charlie Smith had prior knowledge of the location of the parathion. Then an unknown woman saw them retrieving the sack and called authorities. Charlie Smith was in the courtroom but was not asked to testify at that time.

The next witness was Gerald Purvis, the insurance salesman. He claimed that he called at the Richardson household on the 24th. It was not determined whether he was invited or was soliciting from door to door. Purvis testified that he talked about family plans with Mr. Richardson, but Richardson could not pay the necessary premiums; Purvis decided that he would come back in a week. Treadwell insisted that Purvis left with the impression that a policy was in place, but Purvis adamantly denied this.

A pathologist and a chemist concluded that the children had in fact died from the organic phosphate parathion, which was found in their stomachs and on utensils in the Richardson apartment. Several law enforcement officers, including Barnard, Cline, and Minoughan, testified that they had searched the shed and had not seen the bag of parathion there on October 25. Charlie Smith testified about finding the bag of parathion in the shed. His story agreed with Reece's, and he was quickly excused. The jury then retired to consider the evidence, and a half-hour later, on May 31, 1968, returned with a unanimous verdict: "Death with premeditation at the hands of James Richardson and party or parties unknown". Jurors recommended the death penalty for Richardson. Judge Hayes had Charlie Smith arrested as a material witness and set bond for him at $2,000; no other witness was jailed.

After the hearing, Chief of Police Barnard still believed that there was no case against Richardson.

== Incarceration and exoneration ==
Richardson was sentenced to die by the Court and was on death row for nearly five years. He was saved by the U.S. Supreme Court ruling in 1972 that the death penalties in the U.S. at the time were unconstitutional. His sentence was commuted to life in prison, with eligibility for parole in 1993.

Many clues had been overlooked or hidden that would have pointed to Richardson's innocence. Mark Lane, an internationally known trial attorney and author, had visited Richardson on death row. Richardson asked Lane to represent him. Lane began an exhaustive investigation and in 1970 published his findings in the book Arcadia, in which he revealed that the baby sitter, Bessie Reece, was a convicted murderer, and indicated that Richardson and his wife were innocent. At the time of the children's murders, Reece was on parole for manslaughter for shooting and killing her husband. The prosecution had worked hard to keep this fact from coming up at trial. Little had been done to pursue her involvement with the children's deaths at all, including the facts that she had given them the food and that she had initially lied, saying that she had not gone into the apartment.

As of 1988 Reece, suffering from Alzheimer's disease and in a nursing home in Arcadia, had reportedly confessed to the murders more than 100 times, but her confessions were not taken seriously because of her condition. She died of Alzheimer's in 1992. Also, the last surviving witness to Richardson's alleged jail-cell confession recanted his testimony to state legislators, saying that he had been offered a lighter sentence in return for the testimony.

Further, the investigation into the children's deaths had been inadequate: leads were never pursued, critical questions were not answered, and inconsistencies were never resolved. Remus Griffin, a man who had been dating the secretary of one of State Attorney Frank Schaub's deputies, "Red" Treadwell, met Lane and his wife at a town meeting called "End the Silence: Free James Richardson", and then took one of the three copies of the complete original file on the case and gave it to Lane. Lane then met with the Governor's counsel and turned the entire file over to the Governor, asking for a full investigation and a hearing on the Richardson case. The Governor, Robert Martinez, appointed the State's Attorney from Miami-Dade County, Janet Reno, to be the special prosecutor on the investigation. A number of months thereafter, on October 25, 1989, a hearing was held in Arcadia, in the same courthouse where Richardson had been convicted more than 21 years earlier. Lane appeared on behalf of Richardson and Reno appeared on behalf of the State of Florida. Lane argued and Reno agreed that a grievous injustice had been done and the wrong person had been convicted of the crimes. Reno cited the withholding of Brady material from the defense: six separate exculpatory elements of evidence. There was evidence of a cover-up by Sheriff Frank Cline, State Attorney Frank Schaub and his deputy, Treadwell, as well as the local judge.

On April 25, 1989, after looking at all of the evidence presented by both sides and noting the inconsistencies and the injustice that had been done in Arcadia over two decades ago, retired Circuit Judge Clifton Kelly said that Richardson had not received a fair trial, and released him into the custody of his attorneys, Lane and the local counsel.

After his release Richardson went to work for comedian and activist Dick Gregory at Gregory's health resort in Fort Walton Beach; Gregory had previously spoken out for Richardson, amid a groundswell of celebrities including famed Miami attorney Ellis Rubin. He filed a lawsuit against DeSoto County for his wrongful prosecution, and settled for $150,000. On August 25, 2008, after his legal claims had been rejected based upon the precedent of "prosecutorial immunity", Richardson filed a claim under Florida's wrongful conviction compensation law, which provides compensation for wrongful imprisonment of $50,000 a year.

Richardson had meanwhile suffered a series of setbacks after being released from jail. The job at the health resort ended. He suffered from severe heart problems, which he attributed to prison food, poor medical care, and constant stress; he had had open-heart surgery in prison. He and his wife, who had remained loyal to him for part of the time he was in jail, eventually divorced. The settlement by the county went to pay the costs of his local lawyers, while Richardson had been in prison for so long that he became eligible for Social Security. In August 1995, he had a heart attack at his home in Jacksonville. He was flown with a long-time friend, media expert Steve Jaffe, to Wichita, Kansas, for emergency treatment by cardiologist Dr. Joseph Galichia, a friend of Jaffe's. Galichia performed an angioplasty and offered Richardson a job as a caretaker on his ranch. As of 2013, he was living in Wichita. He died in Wichita on September 16, 2023, at the age of 87.

== Compensation ==
In 2014, Florida Governor Rick Scott signed into law House Bill 227, which provides compensation to a wrongfully incarcerated person who was convicted and sentenced prior to December 31, 1979, and who is otherwise exempt from other state provisions for compensation because the case may have been reversed by a special prosecutor's review and nolle prosequi rather than being overturned by a court. The law is so narrowly circumscribed that it is likely that Richardson will be the only individual eligible for compensation under it. He was expected to be awarded $1.2 million. In 2016 he received his first check toward compensation, totalling $50,000 for each year of his wrongful imprisonment.

== Documentary ==
In 2015, a documentary film about Richardson was produced called Time Simply Passes. It tells the story of his life until the vote to grant him compensation.

== See also ==
- List of wrongful convictions in the United States
