= Rádio Capital =

Portuguese radio station (1993–2011)

Rádio Capital was a Portuguese radio station. Founded in 1993, it was acquired by Luís Montez (LusoCanal, now Música no Coração) in 2004. It shut down in 2011 and specialized in music and traffic bulletins.

== History ==
Rádio Capital was set up in 1993 and was owned by António Reis; the company was based in Almada. Capital in its early years set up a network of stations with which it networked under agreements. Three of these stations, Rádio Mortágua (Viseu), Rádio Douro Norte (Murça) and Antena Jovem (Vila Nova da Barquinha) were fined for not relaying the Capital output from Lisbon for six hours a day. The sanctions against these three stations were the first since an amendment to the Broadcasting Law in 1996.

On 20 December 2001, its staff went on strike all day. Having already endured delayed wages especially in overnight shifts, 70% of the staff of 40 protested the delays in their Christmas subsidies, causing the station to only broadcast music and advertising. These problems endured throughout 2002. On 4 October 2002, seven of its staff were dismissed—an administrator, a presenter and five journalists—due to supposed reorganization.

It was acquired by LusoCanal (owned by Luís Montez) in 2004. Under its ownership, on 15 March 2006, the station was added to TV Cabo's digital service on cable and satellite, alongside its sister stations Rádio Europa Lisboa, Radar, Oxigénio and Marginal.

In March 2011, it was announced that the station would shut down and replaced by Rádio Sudoeste TMN. The switchover took place on 25 March.
