= Time Simply Passes =

2015 documentary film by Ty Flowers

- Directed by: Ty Flowers
- Produced by: Ty Flowers, Charles Flowers
- Cinematography: Ty Flowers, Connor Kammerer
- Edited by: Ty Flowers
- Music by: Ty Flowers, Phil Nicolazzo
- Production company: Tanman Films
- Distributed by: Indie Rights (USA)
- Release dates: September 27, 2015 (U.S. Film Festival); January 9, 2018
- Running time: 54 minutes
- Country: United States
- Language: English

Time Simply Passes is a 2015 US documentary film chronicling the life and wrongful conviction of James Joseph Richardson. It details the circumstances leading to his 1967 arrest for the poisoning deaths of his seven children in Arcadia, Florida, his twenty-one years spent in prison, his miraculous release in 1989 upon the discovery of hidden evidence, and the twenty-five years he spent following his release attempting to obtain compensation from the State of Florida. It features exclusive interviews with Barry Scheck, Don Horn, Peter Gallagher, Geraldine Thompson, Tim Edman, and James Joseph Richardson. The film is directed and produced by Ty Flowers, who worked with his father, Charles Flowers, a journalist who helped free James through his work on the case in the 1980s. It was acquired by Indie Rights and released on digital platforms in January 2018.

== Synopsis ==
On October 25, 1967, the seven Richardson children, ranging in age from two to eight, consumed food poisoned with parathion in Arcadia, Florida. The night before, Annie Mae Richardson, James' wife, had prepared a lunch of beans, rice, and grits for the children. The meal was placed in a locked refrigerator overnight. In the morning the Richardsons left to work at the orange groves 16 miles away. A neighbor, Betsy Reece, was delegated to take care of the children while their parents were at work. James was tried and convicted of the murder on May 27, 1968 and sentenced to death.

In 1988 Reese, suffering from Alzheimer's disease and in a nursing home in Arcadia, had reportedly confessed to the murders more than 100 times, but her confessions were not taken seriously because of her condition. Also, the last surviving witness to Richardson’s alleged jail-cell confession recanted his testimony to state legislators, saying that he had been offered a lighter sentence in return for the testimony. James was released from prison on October 25, 1989 after a new hearing was held. James fought the State of Florida in court for compensation until a new bill was passed to award him $1.2 million in 2014.

== Awards ==
- 2015: Full Bloom Film Festival, Official Selection. Award for Best Feature Documentary.
- 2015: Fort Lauderdale International Film Festival, Official Selection
- 2015: Tampa Bay Underground Film Festival, Award for Best Feature Documentary
- 2016: Thessaloniki Documentary Festival, Official Selection
- 2016: Tallgrass Film Festival, Official Selection. Audience Award for Best Documentary Film
- 2016: Black Harvest Film Festival, Official Selection
- 2017: Jaipur International Film Festival Golden Camel Award for Best Director.
- 2016: Verzio International Human Rights Film Festival, Official Selection
- 2016: Docuwest Film Festival, Award for Best Mid-Length Film

== Release ==
Following a festival run with screenings and awards around the world, the film was acquired by Indie Rights and distributed digitally in 2018 via Amazon and other platforms.

In February 2018 the film was shown several times in Arcadia, FL as part of a 50th anniversary remembrance ceremony honoring the victims of the poisoning that led to the imprisonment of James Richardson, and was received warmly by the town.

== Critical reception ==
The film received positive reviews.

"Sometimes a documentary can tell such compelling story that from the first minute you can’t help but jump onboard and root for the underdog... It's a lesson we shouldn’t forget, and one whose timing couldn’t be better. 9/10" -Paul Percellin, Filmthreat

"The few glimmers of hope here come from those who have aided him over the years, but in the end we're left with the image of an 80-year-old man in failing health whose life was ruined for no good reason." -Dmitry Samarov, Chicago Reader

"And through its own history, the American legal system is revealed in all its weakness. An exciting story that has not yet reached its finale, even though we probably know how it will end. The way has not been found institutionally, but even the effort has not begun." - Leda Galanou, flix

== See also ==
- James Joseph Richardson
