= Capitalism (disambiguation) =

Capitalism is an economic and social system in which the means of production (the capital) are privately controlled.

Related meanings of the word:

- Economic liberalism, a system in which economic decisions are made by individuals or households rather than by collective institutions or organizations
- Capitalist mode of production (Marxist theory), the socio-economic base of a capitalist society

Capitalism may also refer to:

- Capitalism (card game) (AKA President, Asshole, Scum, P's & A's), a shedding card game
- Capitalism (sculpture), a 1991 outdoor marble and concrete sculpture and fountain by Larry Kirkland, in northeast Portland, Oregon, United States
- Capitalism (video game), a 1995 business simulation and economic strategy computer game, published by Interactive Magic, developed by Enlight, and designed by Trevor Chan
- Capitalism: A Journal of History and Economics, a semiannual peer-reviewed academic journal published by the University of Pennsylvania Press
- Capitalism: A Love Story, a 2009 documentary film by Michael Moore
- Capitalism: The Unknown Ideal, a 1966 collection of essays by Ayn Rand and her associates

== See also ==
- Category:Capitalism
- Capitalist (disambiguation)
