= Capitalist (disambiguation) =

A capitalist can refer to the owner and manager of economic capital, or a supporter of the economic system of capitalism.

Capitalist may also refer to:

== Business ==
- Business magnate or capitalist, a person who has achieved great success through capital investments
- Venture capitalist or capitalist, a person that makes capital investments for an equity stake in a company

== Other uses ==
- Capitalist, a member of the Norwegian Capitalist Party
- Capitalist, a member of the Capitalist Party of South Africa
- Capitalist (horse), a retired thoroughbred racehorse

== See also ==
- Business oligarch
- Capitalism (disambiguation)
