= Business oligarch =

Rich industrialists / capitalists of great political influence

A business oligarch is generally a business magnate who controls sufficient resources to influence national politics. A business leader can be considered an oligarch if one or more of the following conditions is met:

1. the use of monopolistic tactics to dominate an industry;
2. the possession of sufficient political power to promote their own interests, often exacerbating income inequality and corruption, particularly through policies that benefit the elite at the expense of the majority;
3. control of multiple businesses that coordinate their activities to a significant degree.

More generally, an oligarch (from Ancient Greek ὀλίγος (oligos) 'few' and ἄρχειν (archein) 'rule') is a "member of an oligarchy; a person who is part of a small group holding power in a state".

== Criticism ==
Western media are often criticised for using the term "oligarch" selectively to describe Russian and other former Eastern Bloc tycoons, whilst treating their Western counterparts—such as David Koch, Robert Mercer, Rupert Murdoch, Elon Musk, Peter Thiel and Mark Zuckerberg—in a more neutral and deferential manner, describing them merely as "billionaires" or "businessmen". A review of coverage between 2019 and 2021 conducted by FAIR found that the term "oligarch" was used over 1,200 times in reference to Russian tycoons, whilst it was applied to Western billionaires on fewer than 50 occasions, despite the fact that both groups were in a position to influence their respective national politics. Varoufakis and Winters emphasise the geopolitical context: post-2014 Crimea/Ukraine coverage amplified the term for propaganda value, sparing Western elites.

Anne Applebaum has observed that Western media fixate on oligarchs from the former Eastern Bloc, such as the post-Soviet privatisers, as symbols of corruption, yet overlook the manner in which Western moguls such as Murdoch or Thiel acquire wealth legally through "friends in high places" and erode democracy through media control and lobbying. She argues that this selective labelling reflects a failure to acknowledge the existence of "hybrid" oligarchies in the West, where figures such as Poland's Daniel Obajtek mirror patterns found in the United States but are spared being described in negative terms.

== See also ==
- Billionaire
- Capitalist (disambiguation)
- Chaebol
- Gilded Age
- Oligarchy
- Plutocracy
- Russian oligarchs
- Taipan (corporate title)
- Ukrainian oligarchs
- Rupert Murdoch
- George Soros
- Zaibatsu
