= Neonatal Behavioral Assessment Scale =

Test to assess a newborn's abilities

- Synonyms: Brazelton Neonatal Assessment Scale

The Neonatal Behavioral Assessment Scale (NBAS), also known as the Brazelton Neonatal Assessment Scale (BNAS), was developed in 1973 by T. Berry Brazelton and his colleagues. This test purports to provide an index of a newborn's abilities, and is usually given to an infant somewhere between the age of 3 days to 4 weeks old. The test is designed to describe the neonate's response to the environment after being born. This approach was innovative for recognizing that a baby is a highly developed organism, even when just newly born. The profile describes the baby's strengths, adaptive responses and possible vulnerabilities. This knowledge may help parents develop appropriate strategies for caring in intimate relationships to enhance their earliest relationship with the child.

== Test procedure ==
The Brazelton scale produces a total of 47 scores, of which 27 are behavioral related and 20 are elicited responses. These scores measure a variety of areas including the "neurological, social, and behavioral aspects of a newborn's functioning." Additionally, "factors such as reflexes, responses to stress, startle reactions, cuddliness, motor maturity, ability to habituate to sensory stimuli, and hand-mouth coordination are all assessed."

Validity evidence is strong for the Brazelton scale, providing a considerable research base. This scale has been used widely as a research tool as well as a diagnostic tool for special purposes. Following is a list of various research projects that have implemented the Brazelton scale:

- "Used to evaluate the effects of low birth weight on premature infants"
- "Used it to study the effects of cocaine use in pregnancy"
- "Prenatal alcohol exposure"
- "Prenatal Iron deficiency"
- "Prenatal maternal mood"
- "Prenatal maternal dopamine levels"
- "Environmental agents"
- "Parent-infant attachment"
- "Gender differences in newborns"
- "High-risk neonates"

Despite the influence of the Brazelton scale, it has some drawbacks. The biggest is that no norms are available. Therefore, as examiners and researchers say that one infant scored higher than another one, there is no standard sample with which to compare. NBAS examiners are trained to encourage neonates to demonstrate a full range of their behavioral capabilities in an attempt to mitigate this potential drawback.

Further, the scores are not completely understood; further testing is required. As for validity, it has "poorly documented predictive and construct validity." It also does not do a good job at predicting later intelligence, although the scale is supposed to assess the "infant's role in the mother-infant social relationship" from which high scores are supposed to presume "high levels of intelligence.".

A 2018 systematic review of the NBAS on its relationship to supporting caregivers and improving outcomes for caregivers and infants found only very low-quality evidence for improving parent-infant interaction for mostly low-risk, first time caregivers and their infants.

Therefore, the primary value of the test is as a research tool and a supplement test to other medical testing procedures.

Training is necessary for effective and reliable administration of the NBAS.
