= Emitter =

Emitter may refer to:

== Devices which emit charged particles ==
- Cathode, or negative electrode, in a vacuum tube or diode
- Anode, or positive electrode, in certain applications based on the emission of ions from a solid surface
- One of the three terminals of a bipolar transistor

== Devices which emit electromagnetic radiation ==
- Lambertian emitter, a light source whose radiance varies with angle according to Lambert's cosine law
- An infrared LED used to emulate a remote control

== Other uses ==
- A device used in drip irrigation
- A compiler's code generator

== See also ==
- Emission (disambiguation)
- Emiter
