= Oldtown =

Oldtown can refer to:

== Places ==
England

- Oldtown, Barnsley, South Yorkshire

Northern Ireland

- Oldtown, County Antrim, a townland in County Antrim

Republic of Ireland

- Oldtown, Castlelost, a townland in the civil parish of Castlelost, barony of Fartullagh, County Westmeath
- Oldtown, County Dublin
- Oldtown, Letterkenny

Note: There are over 30 more townlands named Oldtown in the Republic of Ireland.

United States

- Oldtown, Idaho
- Oldtown, Kentucky
- Oldtown, Maryland
- Oldtown, Ohio, an unincorporated community
- Oldtown Creek, a stream in Ohio
- Harrodsburg, Kentucky, in the United States (formerly known as Oldtown)

== Other ==
- Oldtown (A Song of Ice and Fire), fictional city in the novel series A Song of Ice and Fire by George R. R. Martin

== See also ==
- Old Town (disambiguation)
- Old City (disambiguation)
