= Nikola Mladenov =

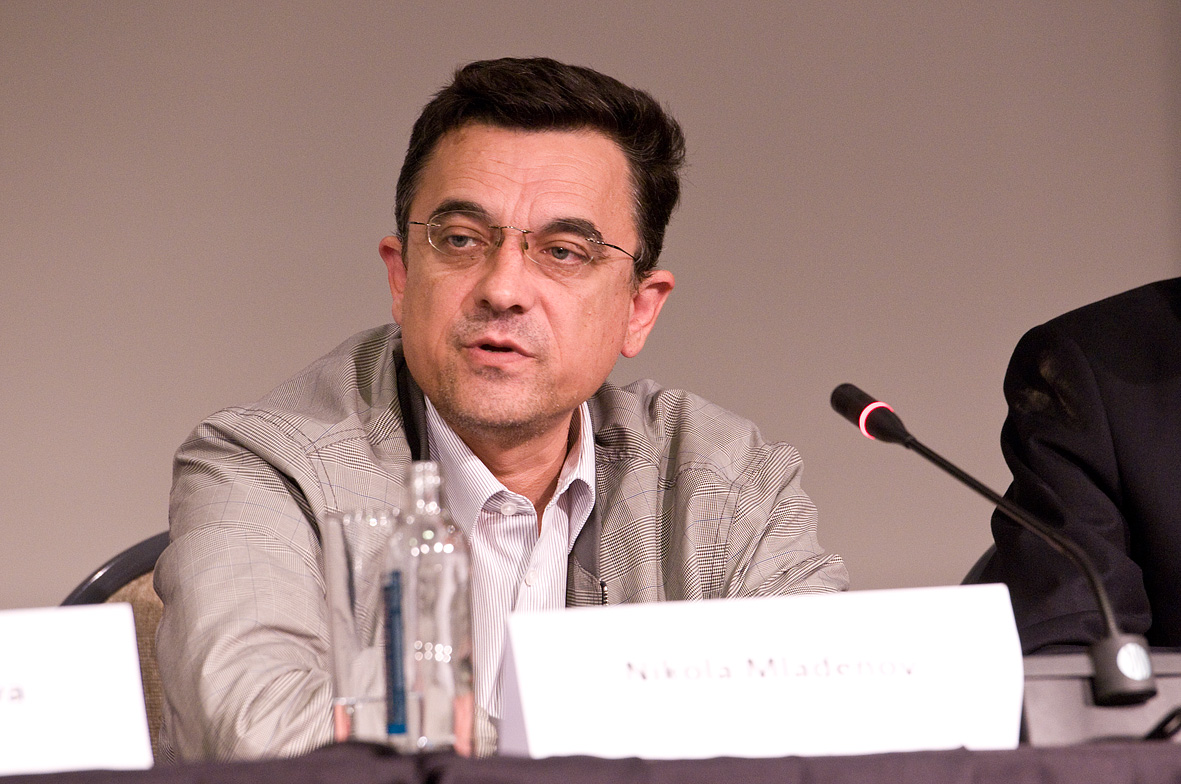
- Nikola Mladenov during a conference in 2012
- Born: Nikola Mladenov; 10 March 1964; Skopje, Yugoslavia (today Macedonia)
- Died: 26 March 2013 (aged 49); Skopje, Macedonia
- Occupation: journalist
- Known for: founder and managing editor of Fokus, Swiss accounts affair

Nikola Mladenov (Macedonian: Никола Младенов; 10 March 1964 – 26 March 2013) was a Macedonian journalist, actor, founder and managing editor of the weekly newspaper Fokus, widely regarded as one of the most reputable journalists in Macedonia, who along with his colleagues from the newspaper Mlad borec is considered to have laid the basis for the pluralistic principles in the Macedonian journalism. The "Award for best research story of the year – Nikola Mladenov", which is awarded by the Macedonian Institute for Media, is named after him.

== Biography ==
=== Early years ===
Nikola Mladenov was born in Skopje on 10 March 1964. His career began as an actor but in the middle of the 1980s he joined the newspaper Mlad Borec as a journalist, where he gained reputation and affirmation as a pioneer in the democratic processes in SR Macedonia. The newspaper was published by the Union of Socialist Youth of Macedonia and predominantly dealt with the autocensorship and addressing critics for the sins of the communist nomenclature. While working for this newspaper, Mladenov also disclosed information concerning the people listed on the so-called "blacklists" in the Macedonian journalism. After leaving the job at Mlad borec, Mladenov founded a radio station named Libertas, and in 1995 he founded the weekly newspaper Fokus, which is considered to have been the first independent and free weekly newspaper in Macedonia. Fokus has eventually become a medium for freedom of speech, and its main motto was "Weekly newspaper of the inner, and honestly the outer enemy".

=== Swiss accounts affair ===
In December 2005, articles deliberating information that the president of Macedonia at the time Branko Crvenkovski and the former prime minister of Macedonia Hari Kostov hold secret accounts in Swiss banks appeared in several editions of Fokus. These articles subsequently lead to several lawsuits relating the affair, in which Mladenov was found guilty and fined to pay penalties to the opposite parties in the trials.

Namely, Mladenov was charged with an indictment from the former prime minister of Macedonia Hari Kostov, for whom it was announced in Fokus that he holds accounts in Swiss banks which were not disclosed in the questionnaire during his terms as prime minister and Minister for Internal Affairs. The verdict was in favour of the prosecutor and the accused was fined to pay a penalty totalling 155,158 denars. Furthermore, the court has partially approved the amends made by the prosecutor and Mladenov had to pay Kostov 950,000 denars personally for inflicting heartache and evoking bad reputation. During the judgement neither Mladenov nor his lawyer were present at the court, and the lawyer stated that the judgement was passed upon under political pressure.

=== Death and reactions ===
Mladenov died in a road accident in the night of 26 March 2013 on the entrance of Skopje. The accident occurred near the interchange of Skopje's suburb Hipodrom, where Mladenov crashed at the last curve while driving his car of the brand Mercedes-Benz and died after the car overturned several times off the road ending in a ditch.

As later reported, Mladenov was driving alone on the way back from Veles to Skopje, and few hours before the accident had a phone call with his relatives. But after 22:00 (CET) no more contacts could have been made with him anymore. His wife called the police next morning to report that her husband was missing and after two hours of investigation the police found the car with the aid of the signal that was emitted by his mobile phone. According to some sources, the overturned car in the ditch off the road was seen as early as the night by a passer who evidenced that lights of a car are gleaming in his proximity. Following the autopsy of the body, it was announced that the cause of death was internal bleeding as result of the bash that the killed has had in the steering wheel.

Reactions with condolences to the death of Mladenov were sent by the Society of Journalists of Macedonia, the Embassy of the United States in Skopje, and many of his colleagues. On 28 March 2013, a session commemorating the life and work of Nikola Mladenov was held in Skopje and attended by members of his family, journalists, collaborators, public life personalities, and foreign diplomats. Nikola Mladenov was buried later in the day at the Butel cemetery in Skopje.

== Posthumous recognition ==
The Macedonian Institute for Media decided to name the "Award for best research story of the year" in honour of Nikola Mladenov and thus the award is now known as "Award for best research story of the year – Nikola Mladenov".

== See also ==
- Fokus
- Mlad borec
- Swiss accounts affair
