= Joel Atkins =

US church and Florida NAACP leader

Joel Elvin Atkins (d. October 5 1997) was the Senior Pastor of Zion Hill Missionary Baptist Church for 42 years until his death in 1997. He was a church leader and local president of the Winter Haven, Florida chapter of the NAACP before becoming the NAACP's statewide leader. He was an organizer on integration and civil rights efforts in the state.

== Personal life ==
Theodosia Sarah Owens Atkins was his wife of 50 years. His longtime friendship with Jack Young led to his involvement in advocating on behalf of James Joseph Richardson.

He died in Miami on Sunday, October 5, 1997, at the age of 75. He left behind his wife and four children.

== Activism ==
Joel Elvin Atkins was president of a local chapter of the NAACP in Winter Haven, Florida. He became president of the state chapter and challenged Florida governor Claude Kirk's obstruction and delay attempts of school busing. He advocated for social action over confrontations at rallies as the solution to ongoing troubles in 1967. In 1970, he highlighted concerns that for most instances of death by law enforcement officers the victims were black.

He was photographed with Tal Rutledge and Rev. Omega F. Neaman at an NAACP convention.
