= Osten (Macedonian magazine) =

Osten Остен
- Former editors: Darko Markovich (1966–1975)
- Categories: Humor, satire, caricature
- Publisher: Makform
- Founder: Galerija Osten
- Founded: January 1, 1945
- First issue: January 1, 1945; 81 years ago
- Country: North Macedonia
- Based in: Skopje
- Language: Macedonian
- Website: www.osten.mk

Osten (Macedonian Cyrillic: Остен, meaning goad) was a weekly magazine in the SR Macedonia, the predecessor state of modern North Macedonia. In 2010, Osten was published as part of the daily newspaper Vreme. The magazine has received financial aid from the government of Macedonia.
