= Shpic (Macedonian newspaper) =

Shpic Шпиц
- Editor: Branko Geroski
- Founded: 2006
- Ceased publication: September 1, 2011
- City: Skopje
- Country: North Macedonia
- Website: www.spic.com.mk
- Free online archives: No

Shpic (Macedonian Cyrillic: "Шпиц") translated: "Pinnacle", was a daily newspaper in North Macedonia. The newspaper was free until 2010, after which date it cost 15 MKD.
