= Capital Airlines =

Capital Airlines may refer to:

- Beijing Capital Airlines, an airline based in China formerly named Deer Air
- Capital Airlines (United States), a now-defunct 20th-century American airline
- Capital Airlines (Nigeria), a now-defunct airline based in Nigeria
- Capital Airlines (UK), a now-defunct airline based in the United Kingdom
- Capital Cargo International Airlines, an American cargo airline

Capitol

- Capitol International Airways, a now-defunct American airline
- Capitol Air Express, an international charter airline which belonged to John Catsimatidis
