= Sloboden Pečat =

Newspaper in North Macedonia

Слободен Печат Sloboden Pečat
- Type: Daily newspaper
- Founder(s): Vlatko Kosevaliski; Gradimir Jovanovic
- Publisher: Adria Media Balkan
- Editor: Zlate Lozanovski
- Founded: 2013
- Headquarters: Kej 13 Noemvri 3/1-238; Skopje, North Macedonia
- Circulation: 50 000
- Website: slobodenpecat.mk

Sloboden Pečat (Macedonian: Слободен печат, lit. 'Free Press') is a Macedonian daily newspaper founded in 2013. Its first issue was published 19 October of that year.

In October 2016, the company became a part of the Adria Media Group from Serbia.

== History and profile ==
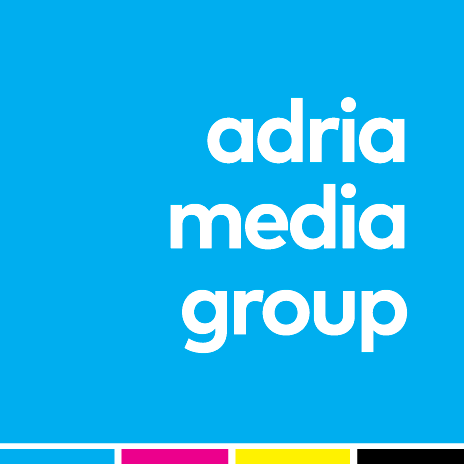
Adria Media Group owner of Adria Media Balkan

The founders were a group of journalists with open minded and democratic tradition, like Branko Geroski (in 90s founder of the most popular daily newspaper Dnevnik, later sold to WAZ) and Gradimir Jovanovic (Radio Skopje brand journalist, chief editor and commentator, retired), with significant technical and logistic help of the advertising agency Media House from Skopje.

Capital founders of the newspaper were Vlatko Kosevaliski, at the time also a General manager, and Gradimir Jovanovic. Branko Geroski was appointed as Editor in Chief.

After taking over the share in "Sloboden Pečat doo", "Adria Media Group DOO" from Belgrade gives full support to the newspaper. As a result of that support, Sloboden Pečat grew to become the largest print media and distribution house in the part of printed media, with a largest daily print run in North Macedonia.

The timing of the beginning of the newspaper was a result of the actual social and political situation in North Macedonia. The motto of Sloboden Pečat is "Always on the side of people".

The printing started on a leased printing machine in own printing plant, with personal distribution, because the existing printing and distribution houses refused to print and distribute it. Hence, with few used vehicles, old PCs and outdated software, together with few courageous professionals, Sloboden Pečat grew up to be the leading daily newspaper, with largest circulation in the market, with a distribution fleet of 13 vehicles. As of July 2018, Sloboden Pečat DOO had around 50 employees, 19 in the newsroom (chief editor, deputies, journalists, reporters, photo reporters, technical editors, web designers, lectors etc.), 5 in Marketing department, 5 in Printing house, 13 in Distribution department, 4 in Finance and Administration department. The company has contracts with free-lance journalists, reporters from other cities in North Macedonia and abroad, columnists, internet portals, as well as cooperation with the State Information Agency MIA and foreign news services.

The digital edition of Sloboden Pečat launched in January 2017. The portal has been modernized and redesigned in order to offer new level of communication of the bestselling daily newspaper.
