= Kumanovski Vesnik =

Macedonian newspaper

- Type: weekly
- Format: 40 cm
- Publisher: Rosa
- Editor: Slagjana Stojanova
- Launched: 2001
- Ceased publication: 2004
- Language: Macedonian
- City: Kumanovo
- Country: Macedonia (present-day North Macedonia)
- ISSN: 1409-9799
- Website: None
- Free online archives: No

Kumanovski Vesnik (Macedonian Cyrillic: Кумановски весник) was a local weekly newspaper in Macedonia.
