= Skopsko Eho =

Skopsko Eho Скопско ехо
- Type: Weekly (every Thursday)
- Publisher: Marmaks Step
- Editor-in-chief: Antonio Spasev
- Launched: October 26, 2016; 9 years ago
- Language: Macedonian
- Headquarters: Kosta Novakovic br. 14/16
- City: Skopje
- Country: North Macedonia
- Circulation: 45.000 (as of 2017)
- Website: None
- Free online archives: No

Skopsko Eho (Macedonian Cyrillic: Скопско ехо) translated: Skopje Echo is a weekly free local newspaper in North Macedonia and has 40 pages. Newspaper was published in 50.000 copies in November 2017. Newspaper has two attachments: "Podobro Zdravje" and "Avto Berza".
