= Capitalism: A Journal of History and Economics =

- Discipline: History of economics
- Language: English
- Edited by: C.N. Biltoft, Marc Flandreau, Julia Ott, Francesca Trivellato

Publication details
- History: 2020–present
- Publisher: University of Pennsylvania Press (United States)
- Frequency: Semiannual

Standard abbreviations
- ISO 4: Capitalism

Indexing
- ISSN: 2576-6392 (print); 2576-6406 (web)
- OCLC no.: 1020492997

Links
- Journal homepage; Online access at Project MUSE

Capitalism: A Journal of History and Economics is a semiannual peer-reviewed academic journal covering the history of economics and examining the development of capitalism and economic thought. Its focus is on how economic questions relate to environmentalism and power relations such as race, class, and gender.

The journal was established in 2020 and is published by the University of Pennsylvania Press. It is available online through Project MUSE. The editors-in-chief are C. N. Biltoft (Graduate Institute of International and Development Studies), Marc Flandreau (University of Pennsylvania), Francesca Trivellato (Institute for Advanced Study), and Julia Ott (Eugene Lang College of Liberal Arts).
