= New Money =

New Money may refer to:

== Finance ==
- Nouveau riche, a term for rich people who acquired their wealth within their own generations
- Money creation, money introduced into the economy

== Film and television ==
- New Money (2017 film), an American film
- New Money (2018 film), a Nigerian film
- New Money (TV series), a 2015 American reality series
- "New Money" (Deadwood), a 2005 TV episode

== Music ==
- New Money (album), a 2023 album by Walker Hayes
- New Money, a 2022 album by Logan Lynn
- "New Money", a song by Calvin Harris from Funk Wav Bounces Vol. 2, 2022
- "New Money", a song by Lil Twist, 2011
- "New Money", a song by Royce da 5'9" from Street Hop, 2009
- "New Money", a song by Trippie Redd from Trip at Knight, 2021
- "New Money", a song performed by Jordan from The Great Gatsby (musical)
