= Zenit (newspaper) =

Local weekly newspaper in North Macedonia

Zenit Зенит
- Type: Weekly (every Friday)
- Owner(s): Ljupcho Murgovski; Svetlana Risteska
- Publisher: Zenit Pres Plus DOO
- Editor: Ljupcho Murgovski; Svetlana Risteska
- Launched: May 2, 2008; 17 years ago
- Political alignment: Liberal
- Language: Macedonian
- Headquarters: Marshal Tito 15
- City: Prilep
- Country: North Macedonia
- Website: zenitprilep.com.mk
- Free online archives: No

Zenit (Macedonian Cyrillic: Зенит) is a local weekly newspaper in North Macedonia. Newspaper organizes the manifestations "Selection of business of the year" and "Selection of the best sportsman of the year of Prilep". When the newspaper started publication in 2008 it cost 5 Macedonian denari, was printed in black and white and had 12 pages.
