= City Cemetery =

City Cemetery or Old City Cemetery may refer to:

- City Cemetery (Raleigh, North Carolina), NRHP-listed
- City Cemetery (San Francisco, California), defunct cemetery active from 1870 to 1909
- City Cemetery (Sandersville, Georgia), NRHP-listed
- Der Stadt Friedhof, a.k.a. City Cemetery (Fredericksburg, Texas)
- Oakwood Cemetery (Austin, Texas), a.k.a. City Cemetery, listed on the NRHP in Texas
- Old City Cemetery (Tallahassee, Florida)
- Old City Cemetery (Columbus, Georgia), listed on the National Register of Historic Places (NRHP)
- Old City Cemetery (Lynchburg, Virginia), listed on the NRHP in Virginia
- Old City Cemetery (Macon, Georgia), a historic district contributing property
- Sacramento Historic City Cemetery, a.k.a. Old City Cemetery, listed on the NRHP in California
