= Capital College =

Capital College may refer to:

- Penn State Harrisburg, U.S., also called The Capital College
- Capital Community College, Hartford, Connecticut, U.S.
- Lancaster Bible College Capital Seminary and Graduate School, in Lancaster, Pennsylvania, U.S.
- Capital University, in Bexley, Ohio, U.S.
- Capital University, Jharkhand, India

== See also ==
- Capitol University, in Cagayan de Oro City, Philippines
- Capitol Technology University, in South Laurel, Maryland, U.S.
