= Bitolski Vesnik =

Regional weekly newspaper

Bitolskis Vesnik Битолски Весник
- Type: Weekly newspaper
- Publisher: Bitolski Vesnik DOO
- Editor: Vlado Laskovski (former); Pece Cvetanovski (former)
- General manager: Mande Mladenovski
- Launched: April 29, 1964; 61 years ago
- Language: Macedonian
- City: Bitola
- Country: North Macedonia
- Website: bitolskivesnik.mk
- Free online archives: No

Bitolski Vesnik (Macedonian: Bitola Newspaper) is a regional weekly newspaper in North Macedonia. First the newspaper had only 8 pages. Since 1998 the newspaper organizes a manifestation "We select the most successful people from Bitola".
