= Stéphane Meer =

French composer of film scores (born 1951)

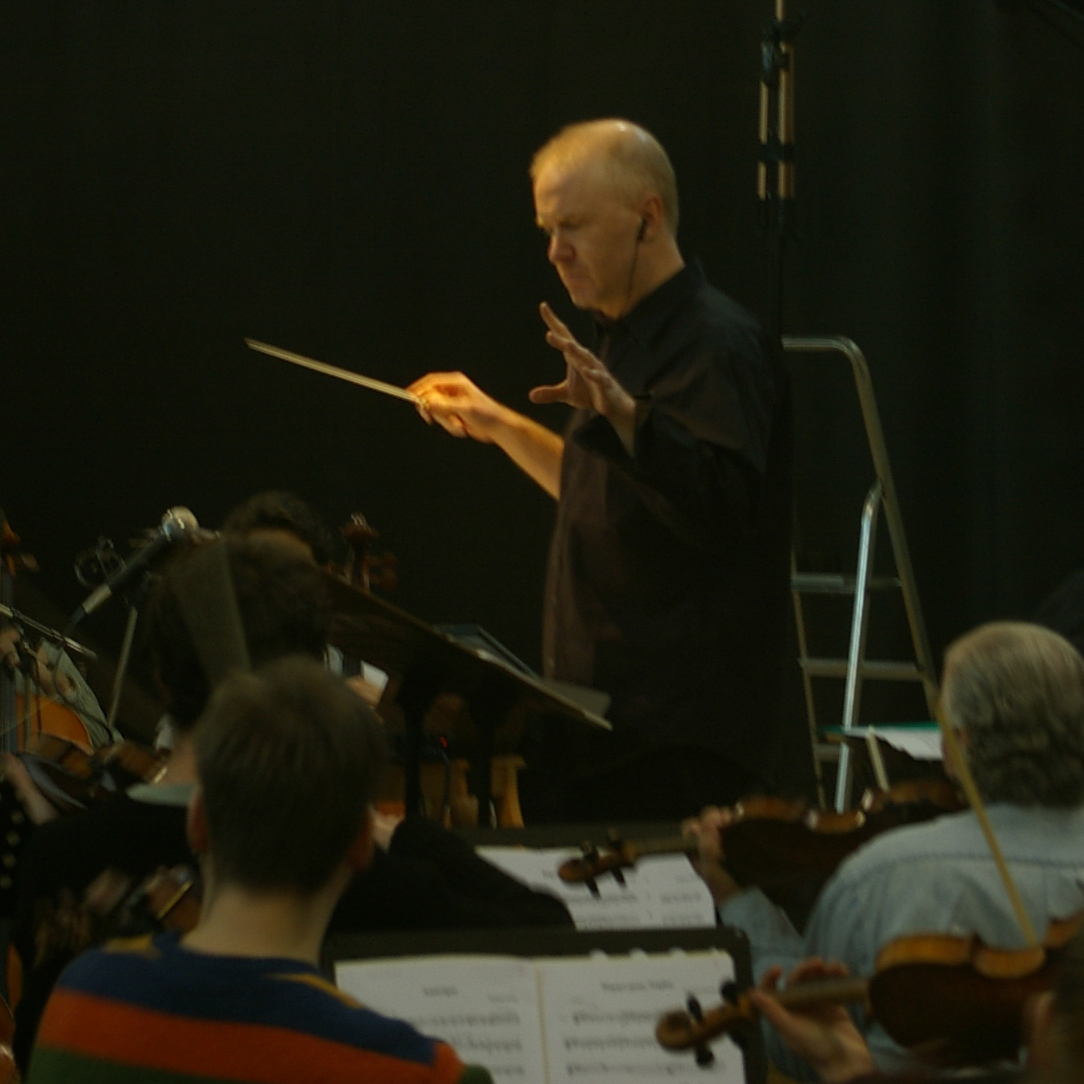
Meer conducting Brussels Philharmonic recording for Mark Logan

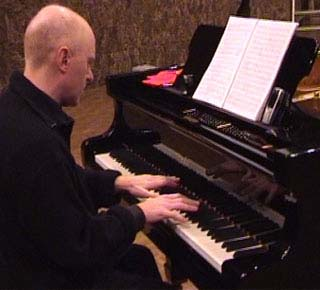
Meer in Studio Davout during Vice-Versa session

Stéphane Meer (born October 5, 1951 in Paris) is a French composer of film scores. He wrote music for TV series and feature films such as Pondichéry, dernier comptoir des Indes, L'ami du jardin, Too Pure and Tristan et Iseult.

== Musical education and career ==
Meer first studied guitar and piano, and later drums and violin. After studying classical, contemporary and jazz harmony, he began working in 1986 with Bruno Gaumetou. After several albums as a music producer (Indochine's L'Aventurier and Sentiment Clou for EMI), he returned to composition for animation series such as Lupo Alberto, SOS bout du monde, The Last Reservation, Shtoing Circus and Four Eyes!.

Meer wrote an orchestral piece, "On a marché sous la mer", for the Cherbourg Sea City park and "The Battle of Normandie" for the Caen memorial museum before U.S. President George W. Bush's official visit. Meer worked on the Disney "Magic Music" project and, with Alix Arbert, composed music for the France 2 Vice-Versa series in 2005. In 2010, he conducted the Brussels Philharmonic Orchestra in a recording for the animated feature Mark Logan.

== Studio Capitale ==
Meer has owned the audio post-production company Studio Capitale since 1994.
