= Capital Radio (disambiguation) =

Capital Radio is a London-based radio station that launched in 1973, now part of the Capital radio network.

Capital Radio or Radio Capital may also refer to:

== Radio stations ==
=== Europe ===
- Capital (radio network), a group of radio stations operating across the United Kingdom
- Capital Radio (pirate), a pirate radio station operating off the Dutch coast in 1970
- Radio Capital, an Italian national radio station
- Capital Radio, a radio station broadcasting in Spain
- Capital Radio, the original name of Dublin commercial station FM104
- Capital Radio Malta, a defunct radio station that broadcast from the Republic of Malta

=== Other places ===
- Capital Radio Network, an Australian network of radio stations
- Capital Radio 93.8, a radio station broadcasting in Cyprus on 93.8 MHz
- Capital Radio Malawi, a national radio station broadcasting in Malawi
- Capital Radio Sierra Leone, a radio station broadcasting in Sierra Leone on 104.9 MHz
- Capital Radio 604, a radio station broadcasting in South Africa on 604 kHz
- XEITE-AM, in Mexico City, known as Radio Capital
- Radio Capital (Dhaka), Bangladesh

== Other uses ==
- Capital Radio One, or Capital Radio, a song and EP by The Clash
- "Radio Capital", a song by La Vida Bohème from the 2010 album Nuestra

== See also ==
- Capital FM (disambiguation)
