= Capital (fortification) =

In fortification, the capital of a bastion is a line drawn either from the angle of the polygon to the point of the bastion, or from the point of the bastion to the middle of the gorge. The capitals are from 35 to 40 fathoms long, from the point of the bastion to the point where the two demigorges meet.
