= The Old Capital (short stories) =

Taiwanese short story collection

The Old Capital is a 1966 collection of short stories by Taiwanese author Chu Tʻien-hsin (Traditional Chinese: 朱天心). Comprising four short stories and one novella, the book revolves around themes such as mainland Chinese immigrants’ national identity, personal identity, and the relocation of military dependents' villages in Taiwan's capital, Taipei. The title of the book is borrowed from Japanese writer Yasunari Kawabata's novel The Old Capital, drawing parallels between late 20th-century Taipei and the quiet, ancient, and timeless aspects of Kyoto, highlighting the disappearance of historical sites and the continuous silencing and rewriting of history in the wake of urbanization. An English version of this collection was translated by literary translator Howard Goldblatt and published in 2007 by Columbia University Press.

Through the different focuses of each story and carefully arranged intertextuality, The Old Capital blends Eastern and Western references from titles to content, and is closely related to three stories from In Remembrance of My Buddies from the Military Compound (想我眷村的兄弟們), another of Chu's story collections. Breakfast at Tiffany’s (第凡內早餐) borrows its title from the story of the same name by Truman Capote; the title Death in Venice (威尼斯之死) is the same as the iconic novel by Thomas Mann and its story content is related to “My Friend Alisa” (我的朋友阿里薩); Man of La Mancha (拉曼查志士) is not unlike a sequel to Chronicle of a Death Foretold (預知死亡紀事); and Hungarian Water (匈牙利之水) is related to In Remembrance of My Buddies from the Military Compound (想我眷村的兄弟們), allowing readers to connect personal memories and imagination while reading. These concepts are expressed by the author Chu with the statement, "Is it possible that none of your memories count?" and signifies her reluctance to accept the constant passing and changing of things that once existed.

While analyzing the book The Old Capital, scholar Kenichiro Shimizu (Chinese/Japanese: 清水賢一郎) states that Chu's literary work centers on the frustration within memory and self-identity. He also comments that Chu's seemingly chaotic and disordered narrative of memory is based on historical context. Scholar Liou Liang-ya (Chinese: 劉亮雅) comments that Chu’s novel starts from a sense of loss felt by the military-dependent village community as they gradually lost their advantages after the lifting of martial law in Taiwan. Compared to her previous work In Remembrance of My Buddies from the Military Compound (想我眷村的兄弟們), Chu actively attempts to break through cognitive closures, hoping to engage in dialogue with other communities and positioning her work in continuous debate between the memories of two different communities.
