= Ekonomija i Biznis =

Ekonomija i Biznis Еконимија и Бизнис
- Editor-in-chief: Biljana Radevska Grujovska (2016–present)
- Categories: Economy, Business
- Frequency: Monthly
- Publisher: Propoint
- Founder: Tihomir Jovanovski
- Founded: 1998
- First issue: January 1998
- Company: EURO-MAK-KOMPANI DOO Skopje
- Country: North Macedonia
- Based in: Skopje
- Language: Macedonian

Ekonomija i Biznis (Macedonian Cyrillic: Економија и Бизнис), translated Economy and Business is a magazine published in North Macedonia.

== Activity ==
In November 2016, the magazine Economics and Business held its first independent conference titled "25 Years Independent Republic of Macedonia, what we learned about the Macedonian economy and how to do it?", attended by NBRM Governor Dimitar Bogov, chief executive officer of Sparkasse Macedonia, Gligor Bishev, General Director of "Ferroinvest", Koco Angjushev, President of the Economic Chamber of Macedonia, Branko Azeski, chairman of the board of Tikves Winery, Svetozar Janevski, Chief CEO of MSE Ivan Steriev.
