= Old City =

Old City often refers to old town, the historic or original core of a city or town.

Old City may refer to several places:

== Historical cities or regions of cities ==
=== Africa ===
- Old City (Cairo), Egypt

=== Asia ===
- Old City (Baku), Azerbaijan
- Old City (Dhaka), Bangladesh, also called Old Dhaka
- Old City (Shanghai), China
- Old City (Hyderabad, India)
- Old City (Jaffa), Israel
- Old City, Delhi, India
- Old City (Jerusalem)
- Old City (Hyderabad, Sindh), Pakistan
- Old City, Lahore, Pakistan
- Old City of Gaza, Palestine
- Old City of Zuoying, Taiwan
- Eskişehir (Old City), Turkey
- Old City District, a district of the Amanat Al Asimah Governorate, Yemen

=== Europe ===
- Old City, Bristol, England
- Old City of Freiburg, Germany
- Old Town, Oslo, Norway
- Old City (Zamość), Poland
- Old town, Stockholm, Sweden
- Old City (Bern), Switzerland

=== North America ===
- Old Montreal, Canada
- Old Quebec, Canada, also called Old City
- Old Toronto, Canada
- Near Northeast, Washington, D.C., United States, historically called Old City
- Old City, Knoxville, Tennessee, United States
- Old City, Philadelphia, Pennsylvania, United States

== Other ==
- Old City Cemetery (disambiguation)
- Old City Gaol, Bristol, England
- Old City Hall (disambiguation)
- Old City Waterworks, Tallahassee, Florida, United States

== See also ==
- Old Town (disambiguation)
- Oldtown (disambiguation)
- New City (disambiguation)
- Ancient city (disambiguation)
- City (disambiguation)
- Old (disambiguation)
