= Emissions control =

Emissions control may refer to:

- EMCON, military state of minimal radio emissions
- Technology involved in vehicle emissions control
- Regulation of air pollution via emission standards
