= Rádio Europa Lisboa =

Radio station in Portugal

Rádio Europa Lisboa, known until 2006 as Rádio Paris-Lisboa, was a Portuguese radio station which was a longtime partner of Radio France Internationale. The station was known in its later years for being among the few in Portugal to air jazz music.

== History ==
Rádio Paris Lisboa received its license on March 6, 1989, the licensee was Sociedade Franco-Portuguesa de Comunicação, S.A.; broadcasts began in September of that year. In 1996, RFI became its major shareholder. In November 2004, it announced its intent to cease all news operation in French, firing all relevant staff. It also planned a new, more commercial, programming line, countering the French Government's plan, in order to increase its ratings.

On March 7, 2006, Rádio Paris-Lisboa was renamed Rádio Europa Lisboa and started airing commercial advertising. The station was acquired by Rede A, owned by Luís Montez, also owner of Rádio Capital. In February 2008, it joined a European radio network of sixteen stations in thirteen countries, representing Portugal.

The station closed in 2011. The initial plan involved former SIC strongman Emídio Rangel acquiring the frequency, turning it into a competitor to TSF. The plan fell and in June, Montez acquired the station again. Later that year, the frequency was occupied by Rádio Nostalgia.
