= Ancient city (disambiguation) =

Ancient city or the ancient city may refer to:

- City § Ancient times
- List of oldest continuously inhabited cities
- Ancient Siam (Thai: เมืองโบราณ, romanized: Mueang Boran, lit. 'Ancient City'), Bangpoo, Samut Prakan, Thailand; a museum park also called "Ancient City"
- The Ancient City (French: La Cité antique), 1864 book by French historian Numa Denis Fustel de Coulanges
- King's Field: The Ancient City, 2001 action role-playing game by FromSoftware for the PlayStation 2
- SimCity Graphics Set 1: Ancient Cities, expansion pack to the original SimCity 1989 videogame
- Ancient City (film) (Japanese: 古都, romanized: Koto, lit. 'Old Capital'), 1980 Japanese drama film directed by Kon Ichikawa

== See also ==
- Old City (disambiguation)
- Ancient (disambiguation)
- City (disambiguation)
