= Topeka (disambiguation) =

Topeka is the capital city of the U.S. state of Kansas.

Topeka may also refer to:

== Places ==
United States

- Topeka, Illinois
- Topeka, Indiana
- Topeka, Mississippi

== Libraries ==
- Topeka & Shawnee County Public Library, in Topeka, Kansas

== Schools ==
- Topeka High School, in Topeka, Kansas

== Ships ==
- USS Topeka, one of three United States Navy ships
- MS Topeka or German night fighter direction vessel Togo, a merchant vessel
- SS City of Topeka, passenger/cargo steamship

== Other ==
- Topeka (store), a chain of stores in Puerto Rico
- Topeka Zoo, in Topeka, Kansas
- Topeka (film), a 1953 American Western
- Topeka (Google hoax), the 2010 April Fool's Day version of Google
