= Sport Press =

Sport Pres
- Type: daily
- Format: B2
- Owner: Sport Press doo Skopje
- Editor: Robert Aleksoski
- Staff writers: 15 (2010)
- Launched: November 18, 2009
- Ceased publication: April 20, 2010
- Language: Macedonian
- Headquarters: Vladimir Komarov br. 18a/1
- City: Skopje
- Country: Macedonia
- Circulation: 7,000 (January 2010)
- Price: 15 denars
- Website: No

Sport Press (Macedonian: Спорт Прес) was a daily sports newspaper in Macedonia, now known as North Macedonia. The first issue of Sport Press was published on November 18, 2009. The main editor was Robert Aleksoski. It was published every day except Sunday. Its price was 15 denari.

The newspaper ceased publication with its last issue on April 20, 2010 due to financial problems. A total of 125 issues were published.

== Editorial staff ==
=== Editor in chief ===
- Robert Aleksoski - main editor
- Emil Kitanoski - editor
- Laste Dimitrievski - assistant editor

=== Journalists ===
- Vojislav Mojsovski - domestic football
- Samoil Petreski - domestic and foreign basketball
- Dragan Jovanov - domestic and foreign basketball
- Dragan Vidinikj - other domestic sports
- Ljubisha Vladimirov - international football (La Liga), F1, other international sports
- Filip Zdraveski - international football (Serie A, Bundesliga), ice hockey (NHL), other international sports
- Milosh Denkovski - international football (Premier League, Ligue 1), other international sports
- Fidan Kominovski - handball

=== Proofreading ===
- Svetlana Arsovska
