= Adria Media Balkan =

Publishing company from North Macedonia

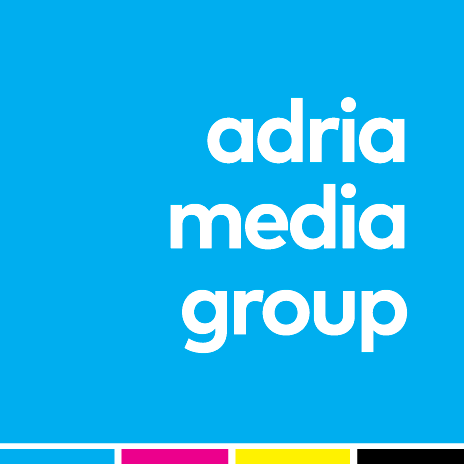
- Native name: Адриа Медиа Балкан
- Headquarters: Kej 13 Noemvri No. 3/1-238, Skopje, North Macedonia
- Key people: Dejan Volf
- Brands: Sloboden Pečat
- Parent: Adria Media Group

Adria Media Balkan (Macedonian: Адриа Медиа Балкан) is a publishing company stationed in Skopje, North Macedonia. They publish the daily newspaper Sloboden Pečat.

Adria Media Balkan is owned by Adria Media Group from Serbia that is owned by Gruner + Jahr from Germany. Gruner + Jahr is a subsidiary of the biggest conglomerate in Germany, Bertelsmann.
