= Makedonski Sport =

Daily newspaper from Macedonia

Makedonski Sport Македонски Спорт
- Type: Daily newspaper
- Publisher: MPM
- Editor: Boban Radulovikj
- Launched: May 11, 1998; 27 years ago
- Ceased publication: May 1. 2018
- Language: Macedonian
- Headquarters: Vasil Gjorgov 16
- City: Skopje
- Country: North Macedonia
- Circulation: 7000
- Website: www.sport.mk
- Free online archives: No

Makedonski Sport was a daily newspaper from North Macedonia.
