= Avto Plus =

Macedonian motorsports magazine

- Editor: Tomislav Biljarac (1993-2017)
- Categories: automotive, motorcycling, motosport
- Frequency: Monthly
- Founder: Tomislav Biljarac
- Founded: 1993
- First issue: 1 November 1993; 32 years ago
- Company: Avto Plus
- Country: North Macedonia
- Based in: Skopje
- Language: Macedonian

Avto Plus (Macedonian Cyrillic: Авто Плус) is a monthly magazine for automotive industry, motorcycling and motorsport published in North Macedonia. It is the first privately published magazine after Macedonia's independence from Yugoslavia in 1991. Avto Plus is cooperating with Italian magazine Quattroruote.
