= Dnevnik (Skopje) =

Periodical literature

Dnevnik Дневник
- Type: Daily newspaper
- Owner: Krug DOO (1996–1999); WAZ-Mediengruppe (2004–2012); Media Print Makedonija DOOEL (2012–2017); Media Print DOOEL (2017)
- Founder: Branko Geroski; Aleksandar Damovski; Mile Jovanovski
- President: Aleksandar Dinev
- Editor: Branko Geroski (1996–2004); Katerina Blazhevska (2004–2012); Darko Janevski (2012–2017)
- General manager: Srgjan Kerim; Jana Stanisavljeva
- Staff writers: 60 (2017)
- Launched: March 20, 1996; 29 years ago
- Ceased publication: June 13, 2017
- Language: Macedonian
- Headquarters: Skupi bb
- City: Skopje
- Country: North Macedonia
- Circulation: 60.000 (as of 2004)
- Sister newspapers: Utrinski vesnik, Vest, Tea Moderna
- Website: www.dnevnik.mk
- Free online archives: No

Dnevnik (Macedonian: Дневник, "Journal") was the first private daily newspaper in Macedonia, now known as North Macedonia.

== History and profile ==
Dnevnik was first published on 20 March 1996. The founders were Mile Jovanovski, Branislav Gjeroski and Aleksandar Damovski. It is published every day except Sunday. Its last editor was Darko Janevski.

On Friday, a supplement called Antena is also published with the newspaper. On Saturday, Vikend is also published with Dnevnik.

Dnevnik ceased circulating on June 13, 2017.
