= Capital City =

Capital City or Capitol City or variants, may refer to:

== Capital city ==
- Capital city, the area of a country, province, region, or state regarded as enjoying primary status
- Capital City (sternwheeler), a steamboat of the Puget Sound Mosquito Fleet, in the state of Washington, U.S.
- Capital City (TV series), a television show produced by Euston Films and set in London
- Capital City Bombers, a former Minor League Baseball team based in Columbia, South Carolina
- Capital City Distribution, a company that distributed comic books from 1980 to 1996
- Capital City (The Simpsons), a fictional place in a television cartoon series

== Capital cities ==
- Capital Cities Communications, US media company
- Capital Cities (band), American pop duo

== Capitol city ==
- Capitol City, Kentucky was a plan for a new capital of the United States, along with the Western District of Columbia, across the Ohio River from Metropolis, Illinois
- Capitol City, Colorado is a ghost town founded in 1877

== See also ==
- Capital (disambiguation)
- Capitol (disambiguation)
- City (disambiguation)
