= YLE Capital FM =

Defunct Finnish radio station

YLE Capital FM was a Finnish radio station owned by Yle. It broadcast foreign language programming. Capital FM also aired Yle broadcasts about Finland in English, Russian, French and German. Capital FM could be listened to in Greater Helsinki (97.5 MHz), Tampere (88.3 MHz), Turku (96.7 MHz), Lahti (90.3 MHz) and Kuopio (88.1 MHz). In August 2005, the name of the station was changed to Yle Mondo. The FM frequencies outside Helsinki were unavailable for use by the Yle Mondo, but services continued in Helsinki. The channel is also available throughout Finland as one of the audio channels of the Yle Digital Television.

== History ==
Capital FM had started in 1978 as a relay of Yle External Service (Yle Radio Finland) programming for the capital metroplex area. With the gradual expansion of foreign language output on YLE Radio Finland, the station was on the air almost 12 hours per day, but there were blank hours between segments. For some special occasions, a full-service schedule was produced, such as the tenth anniversary of the CSCE 1975 Summit arranged in 1985 and Summit between George Bush and Michail Gorbachov in September 1990.

During an international broadcasting meeting (hosted by the CBC) in Hamilton, Ontario, in the spring of 1990, the head of external broadcasting at Yle, Juhani Niinisto, had talked with various international broadcasters about the possibility of a launching a relay-based service. The response had been positive, but final corporate go ahead was not given in Finland until the summer of 1991.

The first programme lineup included the Voice of America in its light VOA Europe version, BBC World Service and Deutsche Welle in German. Radio France Internationale in French joined shortly. By the mid-1990s, the station had added ABC Radio Australia (via WRN, London), National Public Radio (US) and the Spanish domestic news network RNE Todo Noticias in Spanish. For some two years, the station also carried the C-SPAN Weekly Radio Journal from the US.

Spanish was important as tens of thousands of Finnish nationals spent part of winters in Spain. It was also better to relay a domestic channel than the external broadcaster from that country. In the early 2000s, China Radio International in English, domestic services from Norway and Denmark, in Norwegian and Danish, South African Broadcasting Corporation SABC in English (via WRN) and the Vatican Radio in Italian had been added. The Vatican Radio was taken as efforts to get RAI in Italian had failed.

In 1998, the Yle international foreign language production was changed to be produced primarily for the Capital FM, with secondary use as an international service. That meant early morning production for the domestic prime time. With the closing of the Yle external service foreign language production in English, German and French in October 2002, the Yle News unit established within Yle News kept producing morning newscasts on the previous schedule.

In the mid-1990s, the service was expanded, part-time, to five other Finnish cities where additional Yle frequencies were available.

For several years, the Capital FM offered separate DAB versions on two DAB channels in Southern Finland, one of them was in English only, the other in non-English foreign languages. The service was closed with the end of DAB services in the mid-2000s.
