= Capital FM 88.9 =

Capital FM
- Kuala Lumpur; Malaysia
- Broadcast area: West Malaysia
- Frequency: Varies depending on its region

Programming
- Language: English
- Format: Talk radio

Ownership
- Owner: Star Media Group Berhad
- Sister stations: Red FM; 988 FM; Suria FM

History
- First air date: 1 February 2008; 18 years ago
- Last air date: 30 September 2015; 10 years ago

Links
- Webcast: capitalfm/streaming
- Website: www.capitalfm.com.my

Capital FM was a Malaysian radio station which began broadcasting in 2008. Throughout the station's lifetime, it went through two phases, as an urban radio station and as a women-oriented radio station.

== History ==
Capital FM began broadcasting on 1 February 2008 at 12:01 am, coinciding with the Federal Territory Day. Broadcasting in 50% Malay and 50% English, the radio station in its first phase broadcast from a studio in Concorde Hotel at Jalan Sultan Ismail and was operated by Capital FM Sdn Bhd, consisting of Tan Sri Syed Yusof Syed Nasir and Jamal Hashim. The station earned its two firsts: the first radio station to be broadcast from a hotel and the first boutique radio station of its kind. Capital FM also planned to expand nationwide within one or two years, specifically major cities with each city having their own programming and "a system of exchanging information from different cities".

Targeted at professionals aged 25 to 45, Capital FM's first phase played various genres of music: hot adult contemporary of the 2000s, soft adult contemporary from the 1980s, acid jazz, R&B, club house, and rock. One of its shows during the first phase was Turn It Up, touted as "Malaysia’s first dance music radio show", with its main purpose to develop Malaysia’s image of dance music, "create opportunities for DJs and producers exposing their music and sets within South East Asia". The show was hosted by DJ Gabriel Chong and Joey G.

Its charity programme, Kempen Amal Capital FM 2008 was held between May and July 2008, with its advertising proceeds donated to four children charity houses.

As of September 2008, the station had reached the 100,000 listeners per day mark.

After the station was acquired by Star Media Group, Capital FM became a women-centric radio station on 1 December 2011 targeting women aged 25 to 35, with its announcers being mostly women "coming from different stages of life". It also became an "unformatted radio station", mainly playing urban adult contemporary music.

On 1 October 2015, Capital FM stopped airing regular radio shows, preferring instead to air public service announcements, news, and traffic reports using the Content Applications Service Provider Individual (CASP) licence which Capital FM holds which enabled it and its sister radio station Red FM to broadcast without any DJs. This lasted until being acquired by Astro Radio.

On 9 September 2016, Astro announced plans to acquire Capital FM and Red FM from Star Radio for RM42 million. Astro intends to rebrand and broadcast the two radio stations via on-air and online platforms after acquisition. The acquisition was completed on 30 December 2016. From 1 February 2017 to 1 October 2017, the stations began broadcasting test transmissions for the upcoming rebrand.

On 2 October 2017, Capital FM was replaced with GoXuan.

== Frequency ==
| Frequencies | Broadcast area | Transmitter site |
|---|---|---|
| 88.9 MHz | Klang Valley, South Perak, West Pahang and North Negeri Sembilan | Gunung Ulu Kali |
| 107.6 MHz | Penang, South Kedah and North Perak | Bukit Penara |

The radio station can be accessed in South Perak (Bidor, Slim River, Sungkai, Tanjung Malim, Tapah, and Teluk Intan), West Pahang (Bentong, Genting Highlands, Karak, Mentakab, Raub, and Temerloh), and North Negeri Sembilan (Mantin, Nilai and parts of Seremban) on the Klang Valley frequency 88.9 FM, while South Kedah (Bandar Baharu, Kulim, and Sungai Petani), and North Perak (Bagan Serai, Bukit Merah, Kamunting, Parit Buntar, and parts of Taiping) can be accessed on the Penang frequency 107.6 FM.

Astro's GoXuan (radio station) has been occupying the frequencies.
