= Beseda (Macedonian magazine) =

1972–1989 magazine

- Editor: Ratko Damjanovski (1981–1989)
- Former editors: Metodi Petrovski (1971–1975); Blagoja Ignjatovski (1975–1981)
- Categories: magazine on culture and art
- Format: 21 cm
- Publisher: Kulturno Prosvetna Zaednica Kumanovo
- Founded: 1972
- First issue: 1972
- Final issue Number: 1989; 46
- Country: Yugoslavia
- Based in: Kumanovo
- Language: Macedonian
- Website: None
- ISSN: 0351-3521

Beseda (Macedonian: Беседа, lit. 'Speech') was a periodical magazine in former Yugoslavia for Art and Culture.
