= Caring in intimate relationships =

Caring in intimate relationships is the practice of providing care and support to an intimate relationship partner. Caregiving behaviours are aimed at reducing the partner's distress and supporting their coping efforts in situations of either threat or challenge. Caregiving may include emotional support (expressions of care, affection, sympathy, and encouragement) and/or instrumental support (provision of information, advice, and tangible resources).

Effective caregiving behaviour enhances the care-recipient's psychological well-being, as well as the quality of the relationship between the caregiver and the care-recipient. However, certain suboptimal caregiving strategies may be either ineffective or even detrimental to coping.

== The caregiving behavioural system ==
=== Evolutionary origins ===
Attachment theory, an influential theoretical framework for the study of intimate relationships and personality development, argues that all humans are born with the capacity and motivation to engage in caregiving behaviours aimed at providing protection and support to close others. These behaviours are organized by an innate behavioural system, called the caregiving system, which is believed to have emerged over the course of primate evolution to ensure the survival of vulnerable offspring. That is, because infants in many primate species, including humans, are highly altricial (i.e., developmentally immature and helpless at birth), they cannot survive without caregiver support and protection. Attachment theory proposes that this evolutionary pressure favoured the emergence of the caregiving behavioural system, which functions to safeguard the vulnerable dependent from harm by providing them with protection, comfort, and help during times of threat or need. Although this system was first conceptualized in child–parent bonds, its operation has since been established in adult intimate relationships, where both partners may occasionally take on the role of caregiver.

=== Functions of the caregiving system ===
According to attachment theory, the two goals of the caregiving behavioural system are to protect close others from harm and decrease their suffering during times of threat, and to promote close others’ personal growth and exploratory behaviour. Attachment theorists call the former aspect of caregiving behaviour “providing a safe haven”, and the latter “providing a secure base”. The caregiving system is therefore likely to be activated when an individual perceives that a close relationship partner is experiencing danger or distress, or when the partner has an opportunity for exploration, learning, or mastery of a new skill, and could benefit from help in pursuing the opportunity or from celebration of their accomplishments and goal strivings.

=== Interrelation with attachment system ===
Attachment theory also postulates that all humans possess an innate attachment behavioural system that motivates them to seek proximity to a caregiver (also called an attachment figure) during times of threat or need. Caregiving behaviour is therefore complementary to attachment behaviour. Furthermore, attachment theory argues that the effectiveness of the caregiving behaviour enacted determines the quality of the attachment bond between the caregiver and care-recipient, as well as shapes the care-recipient's general expectations of social support. In this model, a history of receiving effective care from intimate others (whether parents in childhood or romantic partners in adulthood) promotes a sense of attachment security – an interpersonal orientation characterized by the expectation that other people may be relied on for support, and subsequent comfort with intimacy and emotional closeness. In contrast, a history of interactions with cold or rejecting caregivers promotes attachment avoidance – an interpersonal orientation marked by discomfort with intimacy, a reluctance to rely on others for support, and the tendency to suppress emotional distress. Care that is inconsistent or intrusive is believed to foster attachment anxiety, which is characterized by excessive preoccupation with intimate relationships and inability to effectively regulate one's own emotional distress.

== Effective caregiving ==
=== Key concepts ===
The central component of effective caregiving is the taking on of what Batson (1991) called an empathic stance toward another person's suffering or needs. This means adopting the perspective, or "putting oneself in the shoes," of the partner in order to help lessen their distress in a stressful situation, or to help them pursue personal growth and development goals in challenging contexts. The empathic stance is characterized by two key, related components: sensitivity and responsiveness (although note that these terms are sometimes used interchangeably in the caregiving and social support literatures). Sensitivity refers to the ability to effectively detect and interpret the partner's cues of distress, worry, or need, and to provide the type and amount of support that is well matched to the partner's wants and needs. This tailoring of caregiving efforts to the particular characteristics of the specific situation is essential for effective care. Responsiveness is the ability to provide support in a way that makes the partner feel understood (i.e., the caregiver has accurately captured the speaker's problem, needs, and emotions), validated (i.e., the caregiver confirms that the care recipient is a valued individual and that the recipient's feelings and responses in the situation are reasonable), and cared for (i.e., caregiver should communicate affection and concern). Caregiving that lacks these two components may be ineffective or even detrimental to the care-recipient's well-being. For example, a study investigating the adjustment of breast cancer patients found that these women varied in the types of the support they desired, and mismatches between the type of support wanted and the type of support received (i.e., low sensitivity to the partner's unique support needs) predicted worse adjustment. Unhelpful attempts at social support include: minimization (e.g., downplaying or denying the problem), maximization (e.g., catastrophizing, making the problem seem unwieldy or unresolvable), blaming or criticizing the partner for their misfortune, inducing feelings of guilt or indebtedness, and overinvolvement (e.g., being overly protective, making the care-recipient feel incompetent, inserting oneself into the problem when the partner wishes to solve it independently).

=== Invisible support ===
Even well-intentioned support can negatively impact the care recipient's psychological adjustment to stressful events if it is inappropriate or excessive, or inadvertently highlights the fact that the care recipient does not have sufficient skills or resources to handle the stressor by themself. Consequently, Niall Bolger and colleagues have put forward the idea that support is most effective when it is invisible, or operates outside of the care-recipient's direct awareness. To investigate this proposition, the researchers recruited couples in which one member was a law student preparing to undergo a highly stressful event, the New York State Bar Examination, and had both members of the couple complete daily diary entries about given and received emotional support. They found that the law students exhibited heightened levels of depression on days they reported receiving support, but lowered levels of depression on the days when their partners reported providing more support than the law students reported receiving. That is, participants in this study gained most psychological benefits from support they were not explicitly aware of having received. However, other researchers have argued that the responsiveness of enacted support is a more important factor than the visibility of the support. One study examining the effects of visible and invisible support on emotional and relationship well-being showed that visible support was linked to neutral or positive outcomes when it was high in responsiveness, and invisible support was linked to negative outcomes when it was low in responsiveness. That is, visible support is not always negative and invisible support is not always positive, but the effectiveness of both types of support hinges on responsiveness.

== Secure base function of caregiving ==
=== Definition and functions ===
In addition to giving support and reassurance during distress, another important function of caregiving within intimate relationships is the provision of support for a relationship partner's personal growth, exploration, and goal strivings. In attachment theory, this type of support is called providing a secure base and is postulated to encourage the relationship partner's confident, autonomous exploration of the environment outside of the attachment relationship. This phenomenon was originally observed in young children; children whose parents showed more intrusiveness were less likely to engage in play and exploration in a novel environment.

=== Components of the secure base ===
Feeney and Thrush (2010) have identified three main functional components of secure base caregiving. First, individuals can support their relationship partner's exploratory, autonomous behaviour by being available in case support is needed. This can include actions such as removing obstacles to the partner's goal pursuit (for example, taking over some household chores to free up time for the partner to engage in a new activity), being sensitive and responsive to the partner's communications of distress, and communicating readiness to help in the event that support becomes needed. Second, effective caregiving does not unnecessarily interfere with exploration. That is, effective caregivers do not provide support when it is neither needed nor desired, attempt to take over or control the activity, or disrupt the partner's goal strivings. Third, partners should communicate encouragement and acceptance of exploration (i.e., convey enthusiasm about the pursuit rather than suggest that it is not worthwhile or will somehow detract from the relationship). Individuals who perceive their partners to be available to help are more persistent in the performance of challenging activities, whereas individuals whose partners show more interference during an activity show less persistence at the task, poorer performance, less enthusiasm for the challenge, greater negativity/hostility toward their partner, and decreases in self-esteem. Partners' communications of enthusiasm are related to better performance, heightened enthusiasm, better mood, increases in state self-esteem, enhanced self-perceptions, greater enjoyment, and more positive feelings toward the partner.

=== Dependency paradox ===
All humans have a fundamental, evolutionarily-rooted need to feel socially connected to other people (i.e., to achieve "belongingness" or "relatedness"). Simultaneously, people also hold a need for "autonomy", or the desire to maintain a sense of independence and self-sufficiency. While these two psychological needs may initially appear to be contradictory (that is, it is not readily apparent how people may reconcile their need for social connection with their need for independence), psychological research shows that individuals who are more dependent on their intimate partners for support actually experience more autonomy, rather than less (a phenomenon that has been labelled the "dependency paradox"). For example, Feeney (2007) showed that individuals whose romantic partners were more comfortable with having their partner depend on them were more likely to independently pursue and achieve their personal goals over a period of 6 months (without their partner's direct assistance). Such research is consistent with the idea that the most effective type of support for promoting personal growth (e.g., accepting challenges, trying new things, exploring) is support that involves simply communicating availability, and that individuals who feel confident in the availability of a secure base to fall back on in case their goal pursuits go wrong are less likely to actually over-rely on their secure base.

== Capitalization ==
In psychology, capitalization refers to the process of drawing additional benefits (e.g., increases in good mood) from a positive event by sharing it with other people. Research shows that individuals who share news of a positive event (such as, for example, acceptance to graduate school or a promotion at work) with a close other and receive a supportive response from that person, show increases in positive emotions and personal well-being above and beyond the boost given by the positive event itself. Furthermore, support for positive event sharing has positive implications for relationship well-being. Specifically, receipt of such support increases feelings of trust and the endorsement of a more prosocial orientation (i.e., the willingness to respond positively in an unpleasant or conflict situation involving one's relationship partner). Additionally, support for positive event sharing is more strongly linked to higher levels of relationship quality and lower likelihood of break-ups in the future than support extended during discussion of negative events.

Gable and colleagues have delineated four basic types of responses individuals may exhibit when a relationship partner shares a positive event with them. Active-constructive responses clearly communicate enthusiasm for the positive event, passive-constructive responses express support in a quiet, understated way, active-destructive responses squash the event and the partner's enthusiasm (e.g., by pointing out potential down sides of the positive event), and passive-destructive responses ignore and/or communicate disinterest in the event. Only active-constructive responses are associated with emotional and relationship well-being.

== Variability in caregiving ==
Although the tendency to care for intimate others is universal, there is wide variability in the quality and amount of caregiving that individuals enact. This variability is determined by a multitude of factors, including characteristics of the caregiver, the care recipient, and the relationship.

=== Caregiver characteristics ===
==== Motivation ====
As effective caregiving involves a great amount of responsibility, as well as the expenditure of cognitive, emotional, and/or tangible resources, caregivers must be sufficiently motivated in order to provide responsive support to their relationship partner. That is, people who do not possess enough motivation to help will be less effective at providing care that is appropriate for their partner's needs. Furthermore, individuals may differ in the degree to which they hold altruistic versus egoistic motivations for helping. Altruistic motivations are centred on the desire to advance the significant other's welfare, whereas egoistic motivations are centred on the desire to gain benefits for oneself, or to avoid sanctions for not helping and/or other negative consequences to the self. More altruistic and less egoistic motivations for caregiving are linked to better outcomes for the care recipient and enhanced relationship quality.

Another relevant line of research inquiry has demonstrated that individuals in romantic relationships may hold either approach or avoidance motivations for making sacrifices for their partner, and the particular type of motivation endorsed influences personal well-being and relationship quality. Approach motivations are oriented toward gaining positive outcomes, such as increases in intimacy or the partner's happiness. Avoidance motivations are oriented toward avoiding negative outcomes, such as conflict or the partner's loss of interest in the relationship. Sacrifice for approach motives is associated with more positive emotions and greater life and relationship satisfaction for both partners, as well as less relationship conflict. In contrast, sacrifice for avoidance motives is linked to less life and relationship satisfaction for both partners, more negative emotions and conflict for the person making the sacrifice, less positive emotions for the sacrifice recipient, as well as greater likelihood of breaking up.

==== Skills, abilities, and resources ====
Effective caregiving requires knowledge about how to support others, as well as sufficient cognitive and self-regulatory resources. For example, caregivers must be able to regulate the negative emotions aroused by witnessing another person in distress. Failure of this emotional regulation may lead the caregiver to become overcome by their personal distress, adopt the role of a needy person rather than the caregiver, or to distance themself from the partner as a way of regulating that distress. Research shows that particularly severe or chronic stressors may overwhelm the caregiver and decrease their ability to provide support to the partner. For example, Bolger, Foster, Vinokur, and Ng (1996) found that breast cancer patients who experienced the highest levels of distress in the month immediately following their diagnosis were less likely to receive support from their husbands over the following six months.

Another relevant skill is called empathic accuracy, which is defined as the “ability to accurately infer the specific content of another person's thoughts and feelings (Ickes, 1993, p. 588). For example, caregivers higher on empathic accuracy tend to provide more instrumental support and less negative support (e.g., accusing or criticizing) to their spouse.

==== Attachment style ====
Attachment theory postulates that the quality of caregiving an individual receives shapes many of the skills and motivations necessary for that individual to enact caregiving themself. Indeed, research shows that personal attachment style (i.e., level of attachment security versus attachment avoidance or anxiety) is tightly linked to beliefs about, and strategies in, providing care to dependent others. Attachment avoidance, which is characterized by discomfort with intimacy, is related to less support giving and with keeping distance from a partner in need, particularly when the partner is experiencing higher levels of distress. When avoidant individuals do provide support, they tend to be more controlling. Attachment anxiety is related to controlling, overinvolved, intrusive, and compulsive caregiving (e.g., preoccupation with the fear that the partner will leave them if they do not provide adequate care). For example, anxiously attached individuals provide higher levels of support to partners who are about to engage in a stressful laboratory task, and this support is not matched to the level of need expressed by their partner. Anxiously attached individuals also display more negative support behaviours, such as blaming. Secure attachment is associated with more effective forms of caregiving (i.e., care that is responsive and not overinvolved).

=== Care recipient characteristics ===
Because care-seeking and caregiving are highly interdependent, complementary processes, individuals are more likely to receive caregiving efforts from their partner when they experience and express higher levels of distress or need. More generally, psychology research on helping suggests that one of the strongest determinants of helping behaviour is the structure of the situation – more specifically, the degree to which potential helpers are able to notice that the need for help exists. In the context of romantic relationships, researchers have similarly argued that in order to enact caregiving, individuals must first realize that their partner requires care. Therefore, one potential obstacle to caregiving behaviour is that the person in need of help may not actively seek support from the caregiver, or may communicate their need for support through indirect strategies (e.g., hinting, sulking, sighing) that are overly ambiguous. However, while greater communications of need can effectively elicit support, behaviours such as excessive reassurance seeking (a behavioural pattern in which individuals continue to seek support and reassurance even after such reassurance has already been provided) can strain the relationship and undermine helping.

=== Qualities of the relationship ===
Researchers have argued that individuals in high quality relationships, in which partners feel attached and committed to each other, should evidence more motivation to provide responsive support to their partner. Indeed, one's own sense of relationship satisfaction and relationship interdependence (the degree to which the caregiver feels close and committed to the partner) are positively related to the amount of support one provides. For example, daily diary studies of caregiving have observed that individuals tend to provide more support to their partners on days they feel more satisfied with their relationships (however, a reverse interpretation – that caregiving increases relationship satisfaction – is also possible). In addition, caregivers who are more satisfied with their relationships report more altruistic motives for providing support.

== Benefits of caregiving ==
Receipt of social support, or the perception that social support will be readily available when needed, is linked to a multitude of benefits, including improvements in mood and self-esteem. Provision of effective care can also benefit the caregiver because it is likely to foster feelings of self-worth and efficacy, build confidence in one's interpersonal skills, promote the self-view that one is a moral person, and increase feelings of love and social connectedness. Research has also linked the provision of social support within intimate relationships to enhanced relationship satisfaction for the care recipient and caregiver. For example, higher levels of support in newlywed couples predicted higher relationship satisfaction two years later. Responsive care is especially important for relationship satisfaction.

== See also ==
- Care work
