= Den (daily newspaper) =

Daily newspaper in North Macedonia

Ден Den
- Type: Daily newspaper
- Founder: Zhivko Serafimovski
- Editor-in-chief: Kole Chashule
- Editor: Jovan Jovchevski
- Founded: March 14, 2012; 14 years ago
- Ceased publication: January 31, 2013
- City: Skopje
- Country: North Macedonia
- Website: den.mk
- Free online archives: No

Den (Macedonian: Ден, lit. 'Day') was a short-lived national daily newspaper in North Macedonia with its headquarters in Skopje. It was founded in March 2012, and ceased to exist in 2013. 2017 onwards, Den exists online, at the website den.mk.
