= Mlad Borec =

Mlad Borec Млад Борец
- Former editors: Liljana Chalovska, Krste Crvenkovski, Aco Shopov, Boris Milovski, Ivan Mazov
- Categories: Politics
- Founder: ASNOM
- Founded: December 22, 1943
- First issue: March 22, 1944; 81 years ago
- Final issue: March 22, 1996
- Country: Macedonia
- Based in: Skopje
- Language: Macedonian
- Website: None

Mlad Borec (Macedonian: Млад Борец, lit. 'Young Fighter') was a weekly magazine in Socialist Republic of Macedonia and later Macedonia (now North Macedonia). The motto of the magazine was "with youth - for the youth". In the late 1980s, under the editorial leadership of Nikola Mladenov and with the backing of reformists in the Republic's youth organizations including Risto Ivanov, Mlad Borec was a leader in media pluralism as it offered alternative, critical perspectives.
