= Branko Geroski =

Macedonian journalist

- Education: Skopje University
- Occupation: Journalist
- Employer: Adria Media Balcan
- Known for: Founder of newspaper Dnevnik
- Website: plusinfo.mk

Branko Geroski (Macedonian Cyrillic: Бранко Героски-Фрфљо) is chief editor of daily newspaper Sloboden Pechat in North Macedonia.

== Controversy ==
Geroski is known to express his opinion through social media, like Facebook and this has led to accusations of attacks on fellow citizens. Journalist Sashe Ivanovski has claimed that most of the funds from the Foundation for open Society end up at Geroski's newspaper Sloboden Pechat.

== Bibliography ==
Geroski has written three books:

- Be a Journalist
- Journalistic Sentence
- Learn to write

== See also ==
- Sloboden Pechat
- Dnevnik
