= Fokus (newspaper) =

Macedonian weekly newspaper

Фокус Fokus
- Type: Weekly newspaper
- Owner(s): Media Plus Fokus DOOEL
- Editor: Jadranka Kostova (2003); Mladen Chadikovski
- Headquarters: Sveti Kliment Ohridski 54-2/1; Skopje, North Macedonia
- Website: fokus.mk

Fokus is a weekly newspaper from North Macedonia.
