= Emiter =

- Categories: Popular science magazine
- Founded: 1995
- Country: North Macedonia
- Language: Macedonian
- Website: emiter.com.mk

Emitter (мак. Емитер) is a Macedonian magazine for the popularization of science. The website of the magazine was launched in 2009.
