= Vest (newspaper) =

Newspaper from North Macedonia

- Type: Daily newspaper
- Owner(s): Media Print Makedonija DOOEL
- Director: Srgjan Kerim Jana Stanisavljeva
- Founded: July 5, 2000; 25 years ago
- Headquarters: Skopje, North Macedonia
- Website: www.vest.mk

Vest (Macedonian: Вест, lit. 'News') is a daily newspaper from North Macedonia. The paper was established in 2000.
