= Vreme (Macedonian newspaper) =

Vreme Време
- Type: Daily newspaper
- Owner: Velija Ramkovski
- Editor: Georgi Berbarovski
- General manager: Slobodan Pejovski
- Ceased publication: 2011
- Language: macedonian
- City: Skopje
- Country: Macedonia (present-day North Macedonia)
- Website: None
- Free online archives: No

Vreme (Macedonian: Време), translated: Time, was a Macedonian daily newspaper.
