= Kapital (newspaper) =

Weekly newspaper from North Macedonia

Капитал Kapital
- Type: Weekly newspaper
- Owner: Kapital Media Group Dooel Skopje
- Editor: Ljupcho Zikov
- Headquarters: Partizanski Odredi 17-1/6; Skopje, North Macedonia
- Website: kapital.mk

Kapital is a weekly newspaper from North Macedonia.
