= Utrinski vesnik =

Daily newspaper in North Macedonia

Утрински Весник Utrinski Vesnik
- Type: Daily newspaper
- Owner: Media Print Makedonija DOOEL
- Publisher: MPM
- Founded: June 23, 1999
- Ceased publication: 2017
- Headquarters: Skopje, North Macedonia

Utrinski vesnik (Macedonian: Утрински весник, lit. 'Morning Newspaper') was a newspaper published every day except Sunday in the Republic of North Macedonia from 1999 to 2017. On Fridays, an addition called Magazin+ was included.
