= Nezavisen Vesnik =

Независен Весник Nezavisen Vesnik
- Read the Truth, be Independent! Читај Вистина, биди Независен!
- Type: Daily newspaper (5 days a week)
- Owner: IBNA
- Founder: Spirodon Sideris
- Publisher: Independent Balkan News Agency DOO Skopje
- President: Nikos Fragopulos
- Editor-in-chief: Slobodanka Jovanovska
- Editor: Aleksandra Micoska Mitevska; Lejla Sabit
- Founded: November 27, 2017; 8 years ago
- Language: Macedonian, English
- Headquarters: Vasil Gjorgov 16
- City: Skopje
- Country: North Macedonia
- Sister newspapers: Albanian Free Press
- Website: www.nezavisen.mk
- Free online archives: No

Nezavisen Vesnik is a daily newspaper in North Macedonia. Newspaper was free at the beginning but from 7 May 2018 price will be 10 MKD.
