= Capitol Theater =

Capitol Theater, Capitol Theatre, or Capitol Cinema may refer to:

== Australia ==
- Capitol Theatre (Melbourne), Victoria
- Capitol Theatre, Perth, Western Australia
- Capitol Theatre, Sydney, New South Wales

== Canada ==
- Capitol Cinema (Ottawa), Ottawa, Ontario
- Capitol Theatre (Moncton), Moncton, New Brunswick
- Capitol Theatre (Port Hope), Port Hope, Ontario
- Capitol Theatre (Windsor, Ontario), Windsor, Ontario
- Capitol Theatre (Woodstock, Ontario), Woodstock, Ontario
- Capitole de Québec, Quebec City, Quebec

== Germany ==
- Capitol Theater (Düsseldorf)
- The Capitol, a cinema from 1929 to 2003, in the Petershof, Petersstrasse, Leipzig

== India ==
- Capitol Cinema (Mumbai), Maharashtra

== Ireland ==
- Capitol Theatre (Dublin)

== Philippines ==
- Capitol Theater (Manila)

== Romania ==
- Capitol Cinema (Timișoara)

== Singapore ==
- Capitol Theatre, Singapore, a cinema from 1931 to 1998, reopened 2015.

== Switzerland ==
- Cinéma Capitole, cinema in Lausanne, built in 1928.

== United Kingdom ==
- Capitol Theatre, Manchester
- Capitol Theatre, Aberdeen
- Capitol Theatre, Cardiff
- Capitol Cinema, Southgate, London (demolished 1982)
- Capitol Theatre, Scarborough, (1929–1977)

== United States ==
- Capitol Theater (Clearwater, Florida)
- Capitol Theater (Burlington, Iowa), Burlington, Iowa, listed on the National Register of Historic Places (NRHP) in Iowa
- Capitol Theatre in the NRHP-listed Kahl Building, Davenport, Iowa
- Capitol Theater Building, Arlington, Massachusetts, NRHP-listed
- Capitol Theatre Building (Flint, Michigan), listed on the NRHP in Michigan
- Capitol Center for the Arts, formerly the Capitol Theatre, Concord, New Hampshire
- Capitol Theatre (Passaic), New Jersey
- Capitol Theatre (New York City)
- Capitol Theatre (Port Chester, New York), NRHP-listed
- Capitol Theatre (Rome, New York)
- Capitol Theatre in Bismarck, North Dakota, now the Dakota Stage Playhouse
- Capitol Theater (Columbus, Ohio), operated by the Columbus Association for the Performing Arts
- Capitol Theater (Salem, Oregon)
- Capitol Theatre Center, Chambersburg, Pennsylvania
- Capitol Theatre (Union City, Tennessee), listed on the NRHP in Tennessee
- Capitol Theatre (Salt Lake City), Utah, see buildings and sites of Salt Lake City
- Capitol Theater (Olympia), Washington
- Capitol Theatre (Yakima, Washington), NRHP-listed
- Capitol Theatre (Wheeling, West Virginia)
- Capitol Theater (Madison, Wisconsin)
- Capitol Theatre, the name of the Cort Theatre (San Francisco) from 1923-1941
- Hargray Capitol Theatre, Macon, Georgia

== See also ==
- Capital theater (disambiguation)
- Capitol
