= Capitol =

Capitol, capitols or The Capitol may refer to:

== Places and buildings ==
=== Legislative building ===
- United States Capitol, in Washington, D.C.
- National Capitol of Colombia, in Bogotá
- Palacio Federal Legislativo, in Caracas, Venezuela
- National Capitol of Cuba, in Havana, Cuba
- Capitol of Palau, in Ngerulmud
- List of legislative buildings
- List of state and territorial capitols in the United States

=== United States ===
- Capitol Technology University, formerly Capitol College, Laurel, Maryland
- Capitol Butte, a mountain in Arizona
- Capitol Reef National Park, a National Park in Utah
- The Capitol (Fayetteville, North Carolina), a department store
- Capitol (Williamsburg, Virginia), a historic building that housed the House of Burgesses of the Colony of Virginia 1705–1779

=== Elsewhere ===
- Capitoline Hill, a hill in Rome, Italy
- Capitole de Toulouse, a historic building in Toulouse, France
- The Capitol (Hong Kong), a private housing estate in Hong Kong
- Capitol, Scarborough, a former theatre and cinema in England

== Arts, entertainment and media ==
- Capitol (board game), a Roman-themed board game
- Capitol (play-by-mail game), created and moderated by Adventures by Mail beginning in 1983
- Capitol (The Hunger Games trilogy), a fictional city in The Hunger Games novels
- Capitol (TV series), a US soap opera
- Capitol (short story collection), a book by Orson Scott Card
- The Capitol, a theatre in Melbourne, Victoria, Australia
- Capitol Broadcasting Center, Philippine broadcasting company
- Capitol Broadcasting Company, American media company
- Capitol Records, a US record label
- The Capitols, a soul trio based in Detroit, Michigan, US

== Sport ==
=== United States ===
- Capitol Wrestling Corporation, a predecessor organization to World Wrestling Entertainment
- Bismarck Capitols, a sem-pro ice hockey team in Bismarck, North Dakota, in the Southwest Hockey League
- Des Moines Capitols, a minor league professional ice hockey team from Des Moines, Iowa, in the International Hockey League
- Harlingen Capitols, a minor league professional baseball team from Harlingen, Texas
- Harrisburg Capitols, a minor league American football team from Harrisburg, Pennsylvania, in the Atlantic Coast Football League
- Harrisburg Capitols, a professional basketball team from Harrisburg, Pennsylvania, in the Eastern Professional Basketball League; the successor of the Harrisburg Senators
- Hartford Capitols, a professional basketball team from Hartford, Connecticut, in the Eastern Professional Basketball League
- Indianapolis Capitols, a professional American football team from Indianapolis, Indiana, in the Continental Football League
- Lincoln Capitols, an indoor arena football (American gridiron) team from Lincoln, Nebraska, in the Indoor Football League
- Madison Capitols, a top-tier junior ice hockey team in Middleton, Wisconsin, in the United States Hockey League
- Sacramento Capitols, a professional American football team from Sacramento, California, in the Continental Football League
- Springfield Capitols, an ice hockey team from Springfield, Illinois, in the All-American Hockey League
- Washington Capitols, a professional ice hockey team from District of Columbia, in the National Hockey League
- Wisconsin Capitols, a junior ice hockey team in Madison, Wisconsin, in the United States Hockey League

== Transportation ==
- Capitol Air, originally Capitol International Airways, a 1946–1984 American airline
- Capitol Corridor, a passenger train route in California, US, former name Capitols
- Chevrolet Series AA Capitol, an American automobile

== Other uses ==
- Capitouls or capitols, historic chief magistrates of Toulouse, France

== See also ==
- Capitol Hill, a neighborhood in Washington, D.C.
- Le Capitole (train), a former express train between Paris and Toulouse, France
- Capitolium, the temple for the Capitoline Triad in many cities of the Roman Empire
- Capital (disambiguation)
- Capitol Center (disambiguation)
- Capitol City (disambiguation)
- Capitol Hill (disambiguation), a number of districts in the United States and Canada
- Capitol station (disambiguation)
- Capitol Theater (disambiguation), a number of former and current cinemas or theatres located throughout the world
- Old Capitol (disambiguation)
