= Juan Zariñena =

Spanish painter (1545–1634)

Juan Zariñena (1545–1634) was a Spanish painter.

Zariñena was born in Valencia. He studied under his father Francis and alongside his brother Christopher, both of whom were also painters. He primarily painted religious themed works and frescoes. One of Zariñena's frescoes can be seen at the Hall of Parliament in Valencia. He died in Valencia in 1634.

== Gallery ==
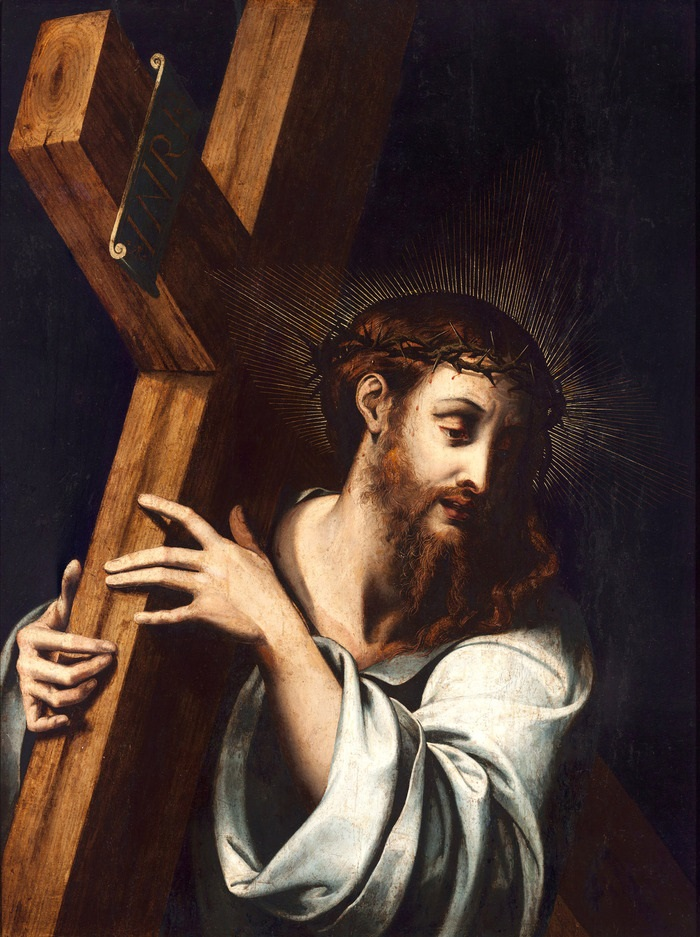
Christ Carrying the Cross

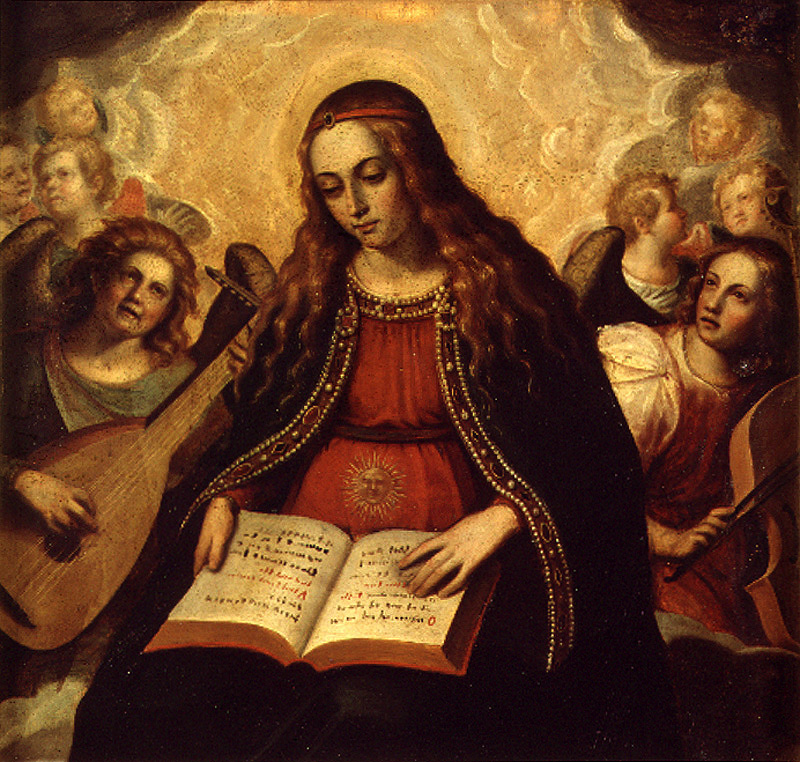
Virgin of Hope with Musical Angels (1610)

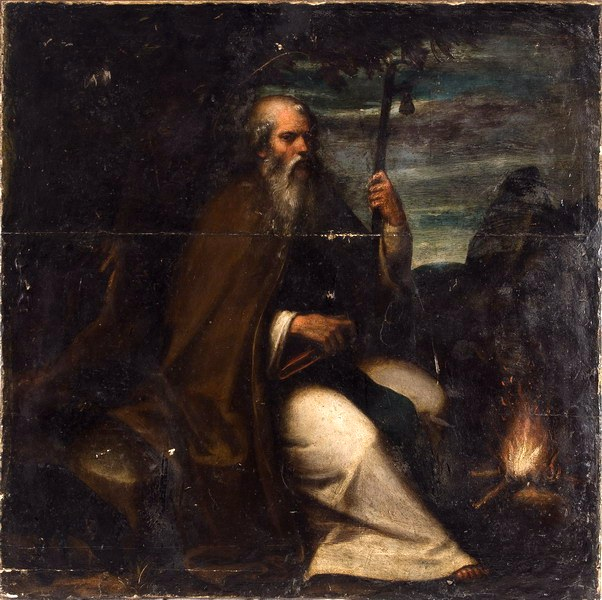
Anthony the Great

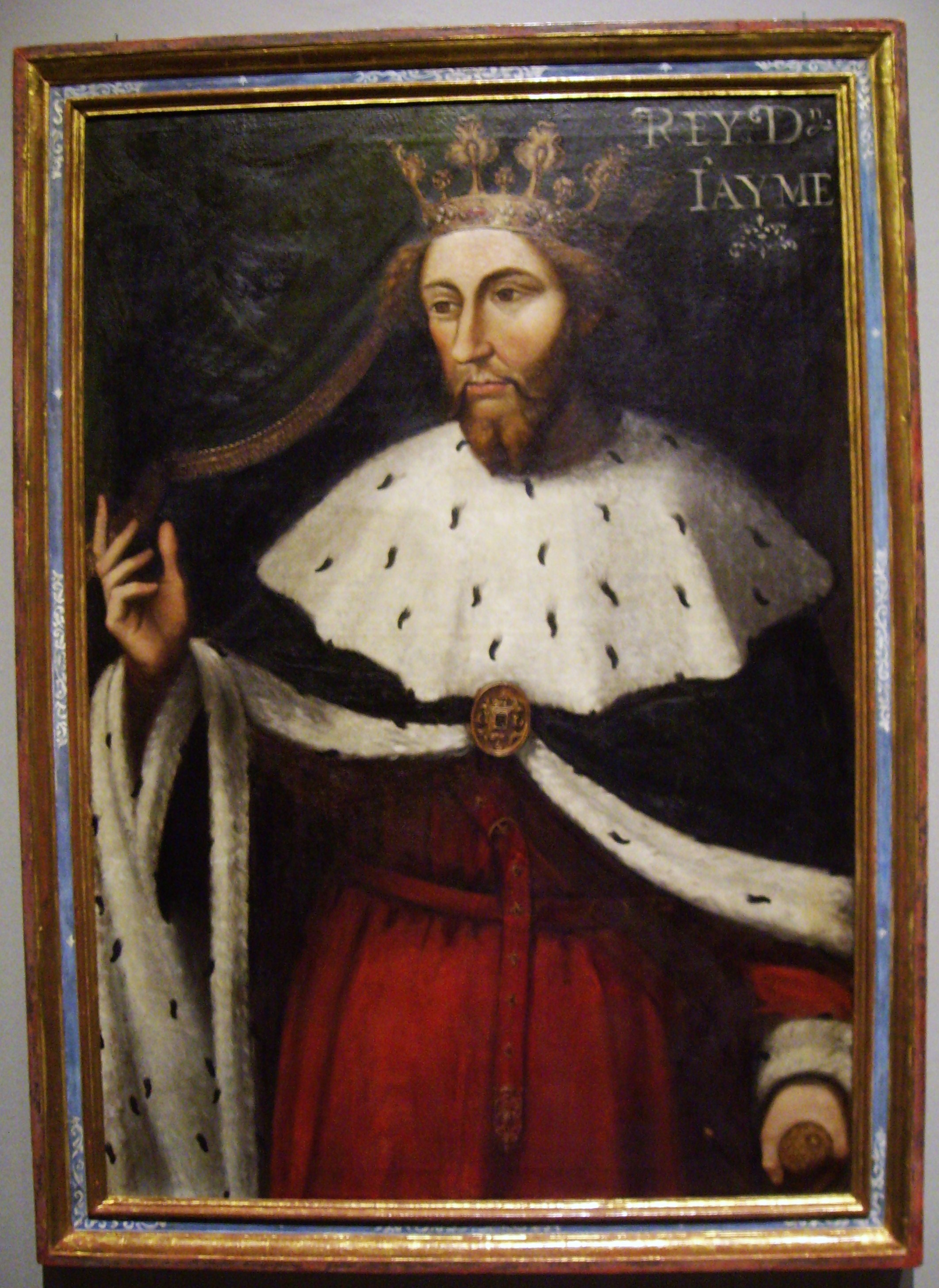
Portrait of James I
