= Eugenio Rayneri Piedra =

Cuban architect (1883–1960)

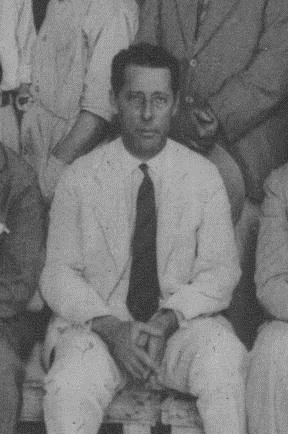
- Born: 1883; Havana, Captaincy General of Cuba, Spanish Empire
- Died: 1960 (aged 76–77); Havana, Cuba
- Education: University of Notre Dame
- Occupation: Architect
- Buildings: El Capitolio, Colón Cemetery

Eugenio Rayneri Piedra (1883–1960) was a Cuban architect, he was the designer of numerous buildings in Havana.

Eugenio Rayneri Piedra was the son of Eugenio Rayneri Sorrentino a noted architect and designer of the entrance of the Colón Cemetery, the Palace of the Marquise of Villalba, and the Mercado de Tacón. Notably, Rayneri Piedra was one of the architects of the Cuban National Capitol Building (Capitolio Nacional), completed in 1929 during the administration of President Gerardo Machado Morales together with architects Govantes & Cabarrocas, Raul Otero and Bens Arrarte among others. Both Rayneri Piedra and his father won the International Contest for the Capitolio with their entry named "The Republic". Rayneri Piedra was the Artistic and Technical Director during the construction of the building, built by American construction company Purdy & Henderson. The first graduate of the University of Notre Dame School of Architecture (Indiana, USA) in 1904, returned to Havana to enter into private practice with his father. He won an international competition for Cuba's Presidential Palace, and was founder and first president of the Cuban Society of Architects. He was also professor at the University of Havana, brother of pianist Laura Rayneri Piedra, and uncle of ballet master Fernando Alonso (dancer).

== El Capitolio ==
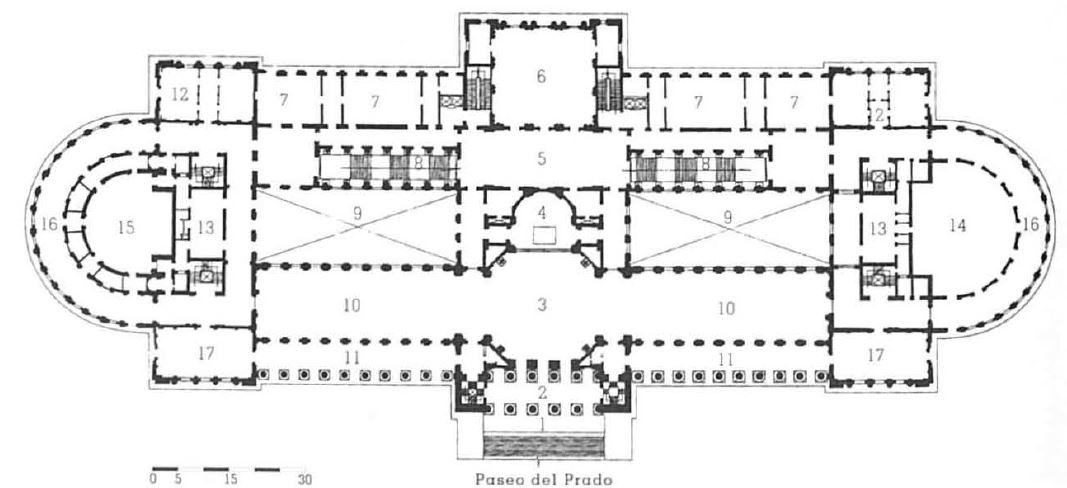
Capitolio floor plan. Havana, Cuba. 2-Entrance Portico, 3-Rotunda, 4-Apse, 5-Salon de Marti, 6-Library, 7-Committee room, 8-Stair of Honor, 9-Patio-garden, 10-Salon (pasos perdidos), 12-Secretary, 14-Senate, 15-Cámara, 16-Gallery.

According to its architect, Eugenio Rayneri Piedra, the inspiration for the cupola came from the Panthéon in Paris by way of Bramante's Tempietto in San Pietro in Montorio.

The cupola, which is stone clad around a steel frame that was constructed in the United States, is set planimetrically forward on the building to allow for the apse that contains La Republica, the "Statue of the Republic". At almost 92 m (302 ft) high, the dome was the highest point in the city of Havana until 1956 when the FOCSA Building was built reaching a height of 121 meters (397 ft). The Capitolio had the third highest dome in the world at the time of its construction.

== Gallery ==
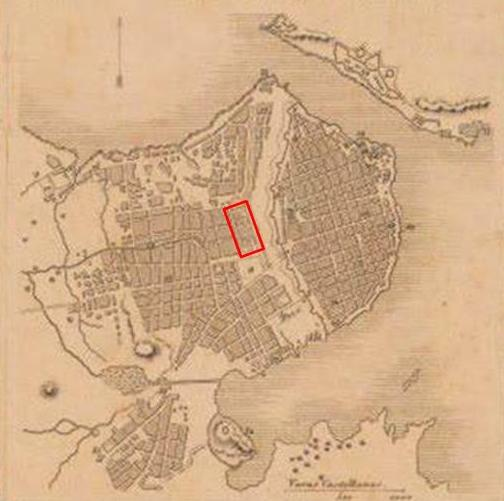
Map of Havana, 1850. The land currently occupied by the Capitol, then belonging to the railway station of Villanueva, is framed in red. Opposite the Capitol are the city walls demolished in 1863.

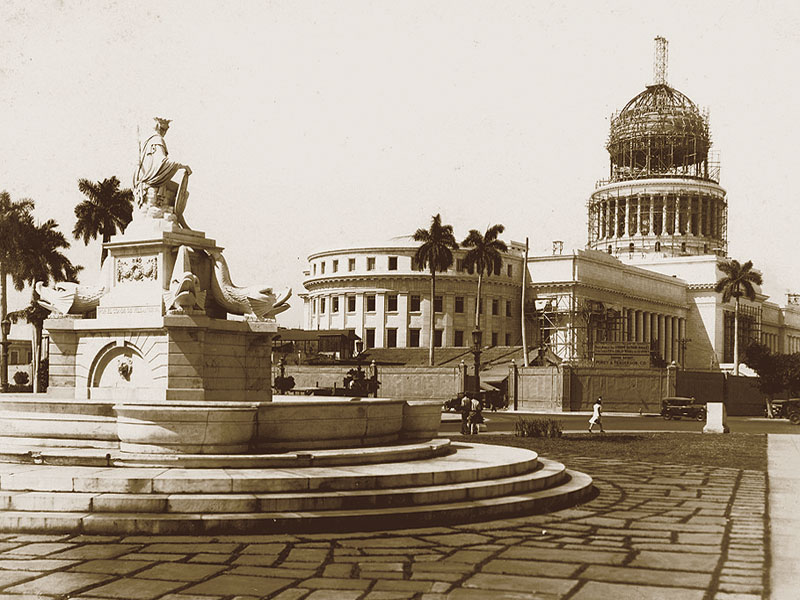
Image of the construction of the upper dome, taken c. 1928

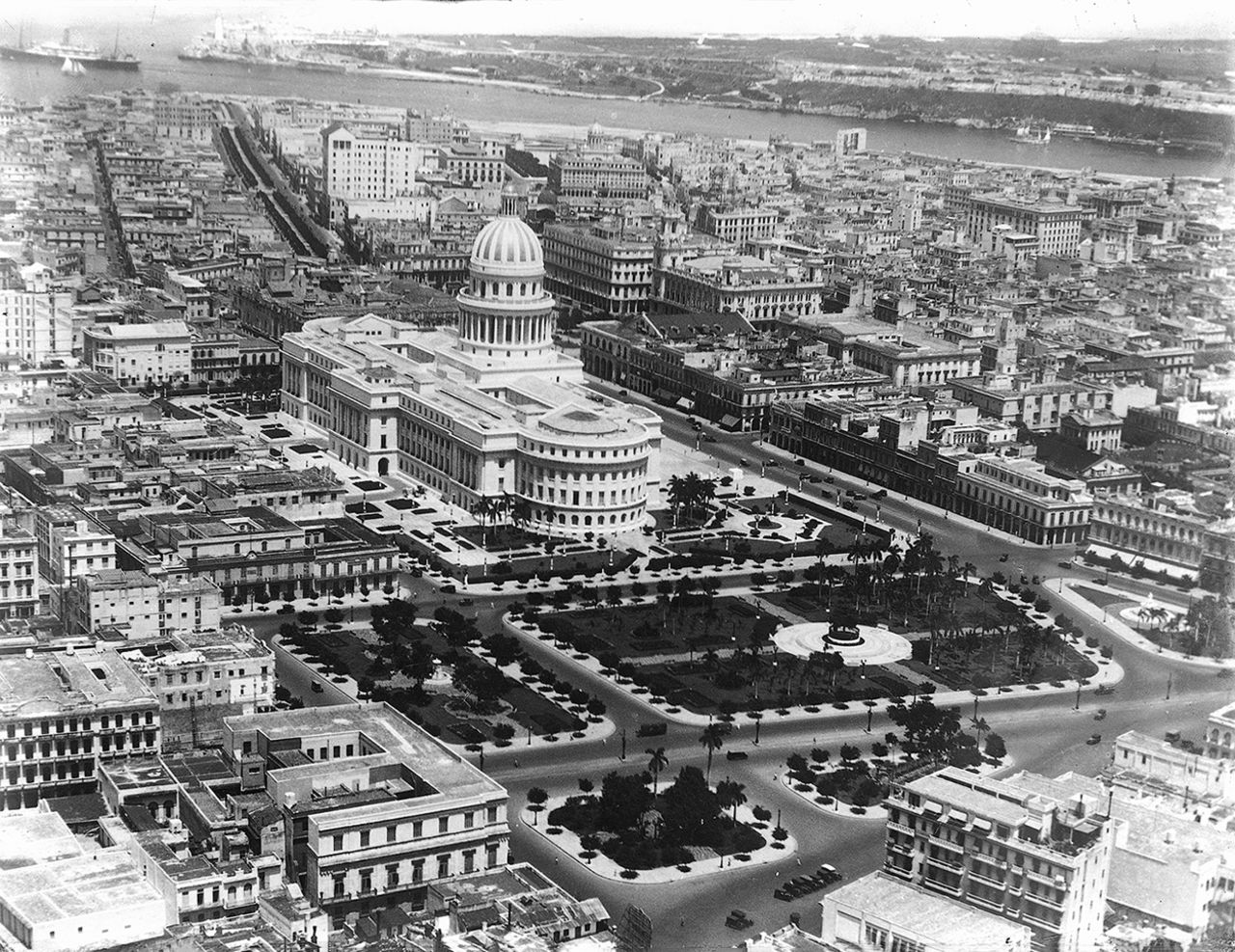
Aerial view of the Capitolio (1931)
