= National Capitol of Cuba =

Former seat of the Congress of Cuba

- Capitolio Nacional de Cuba
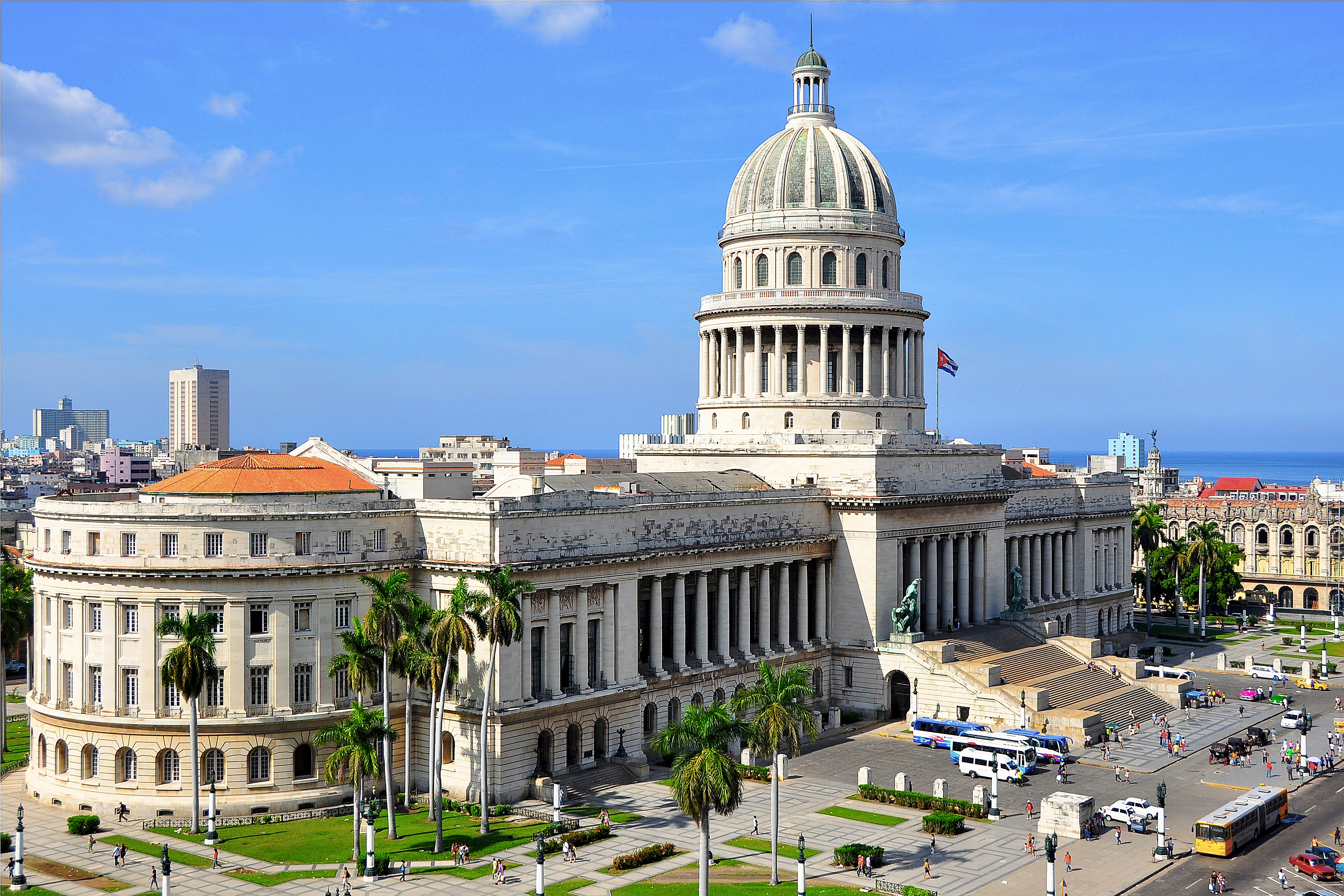
- The National Capitol of Cuba from a rooftop to the southeast

General information
- Location: Centro Habana, Havana, Cuba
- Coordinates: 23°08′07″N 82°21′34″W
- Current tenants: National Assembly of People's Power
- Construction started: 1 April 1926
- Completed: 20 May 1929

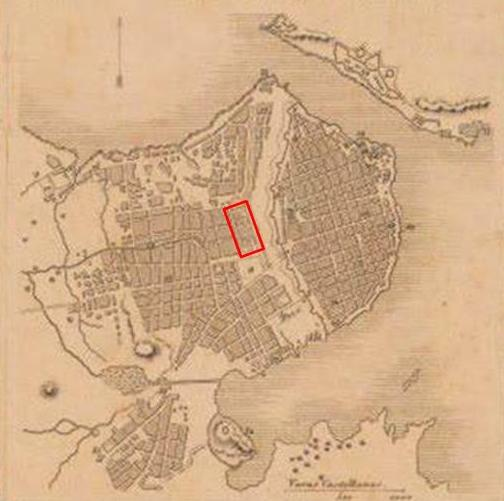
Map of Havana, 1850. The land currently occupied by the Capitol, then belonging to the railway station of Villanueva, is framed in red. Opposite the site are the city walls demolished in 1863.

The National Capitol of Cuba, also known as Capitolio Nacional de La Habana (National Capitol of La Habana), and often simply referred to as El Capitolio (The Capitol), is a public edifice in Havana, the capital of Cuba. The building was commissioned by Cuban president Gerardo Machado and built from 1926 to 1929 under the direction of Eugenio Rayneri Piedra.

== History ==
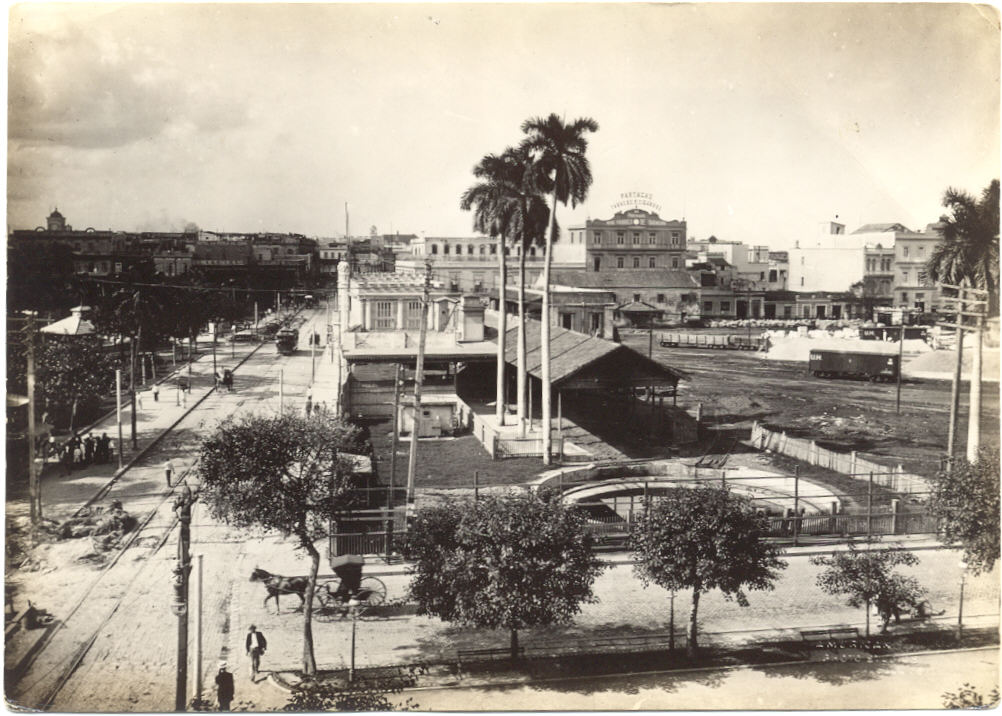
The railway station of Villanueva, c. 1900

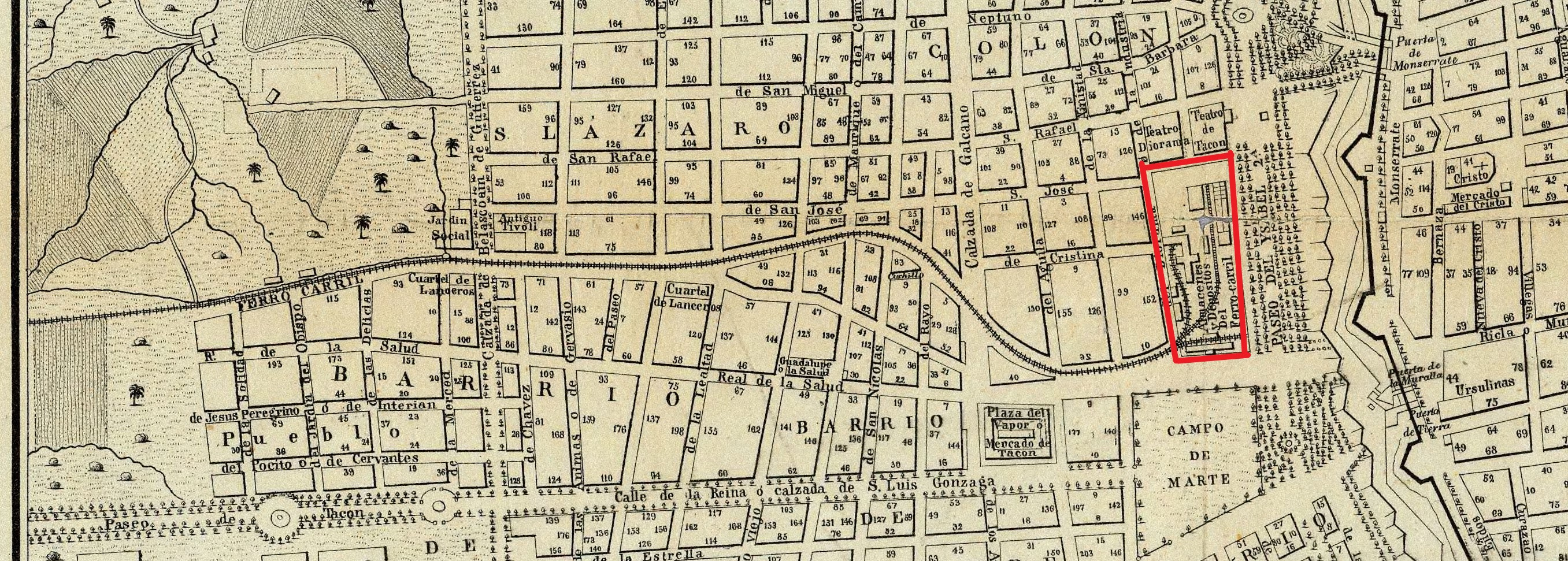
Villanueva Railway. Map shows train path down present day Avenida Zanja.

The Havana Capitol building was built on land that was a railroad terminal and used to belong to the Villanueva Railway. The project began in April 1926, during the Gerardo Machado administration. Construction was overseen by the U.S. firm of Purdy and Henderson.

"El Capitolio" is 207 meters long and 91 meters wide. Although its design is often compared to the United States Capitol, it is not a replica. To finish its construction they needed more than 5000 workers, 3 years, 3 months and 20 days; as well as approximately 17 million American dollars". Completed in 1929, it was the tallest building in Havana until the 1950s. It houses the world's third largest indoor statue.

On August 30, 2019, the historian of the city Eusebio Leal proclaimed the end of the renovation with the unveiling of the dome.

== Building ==
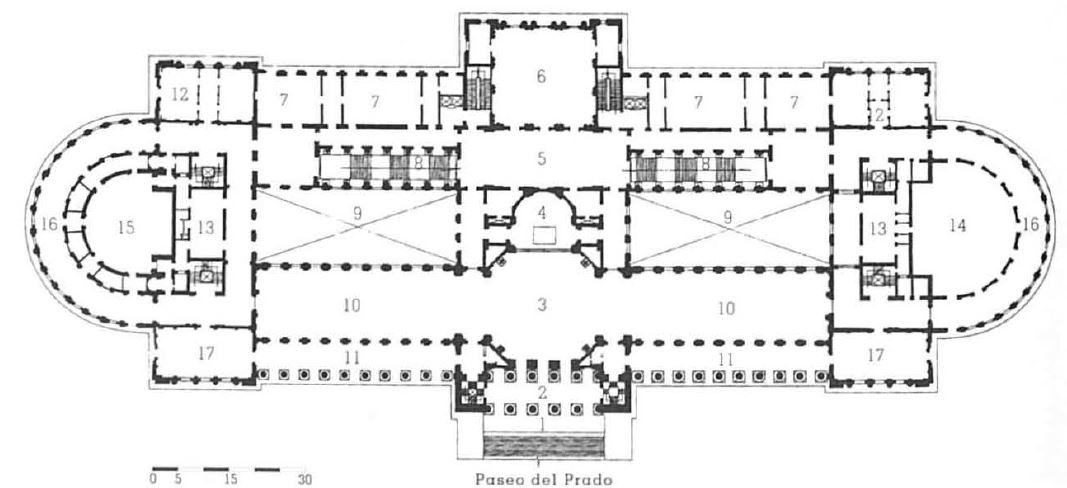
Capitolio floor plan. Havana, Cuba. 2: Entrance Portico, 3: Rotunda, 4: Apse, 5: Salon de Marti, 6: Library, 7: Committee room, 8: Stair of Honor, 9: Patio-garden, 10: Salon (pasos perdidos), 12: Secretary, 14: Senate, 15: Cámara, 16: Gallery.

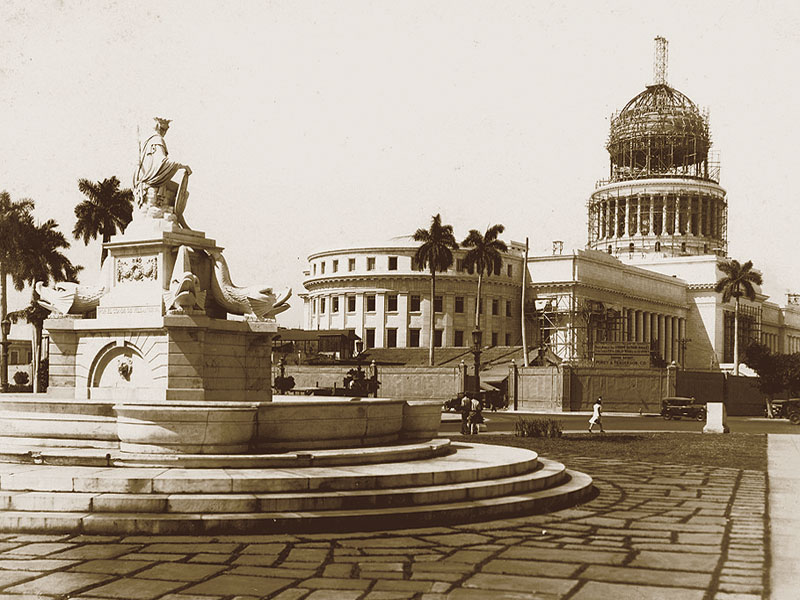
Image of the construction of the upper dome, taken c. 1928.

The cupola, which is stone-clad around a steel frame that was constructed in the United States, is set planimetrically forward on the building to allow for the apse that contains La Republica, the "Statue of the Republic". At almost 92 m (302 ft) high, the dome was the highest point in the city of Havana until 1956 when the FOCSA Building was built reaching a height of 121 meters (397 ft). The Capitolio had the third-highest dome in the world at the time of its construction. According to Eugenio Rayneri Piedra, the inspiration for the cupola came from the Panthéon in Paris by way of Bramante's Tempietto in San Pietro in Montorio.

The 55 steps leading to the main entrance, La Escalinata, is flanked by 6.5 m (21 ft) statues by the Italian artist Angelo Zanelli. To the left is Work (El Trabajo) and to the right The Tutelary Virtue (La Virtud Tutelar). The steps lead up to the central portico, which is 36 m (118 ft) wide and more than 16 m (52 1/2 ft) tall. There are 12 granite columns in the ionic order arranged in two rows and each over 14 m (46 ft) tall.

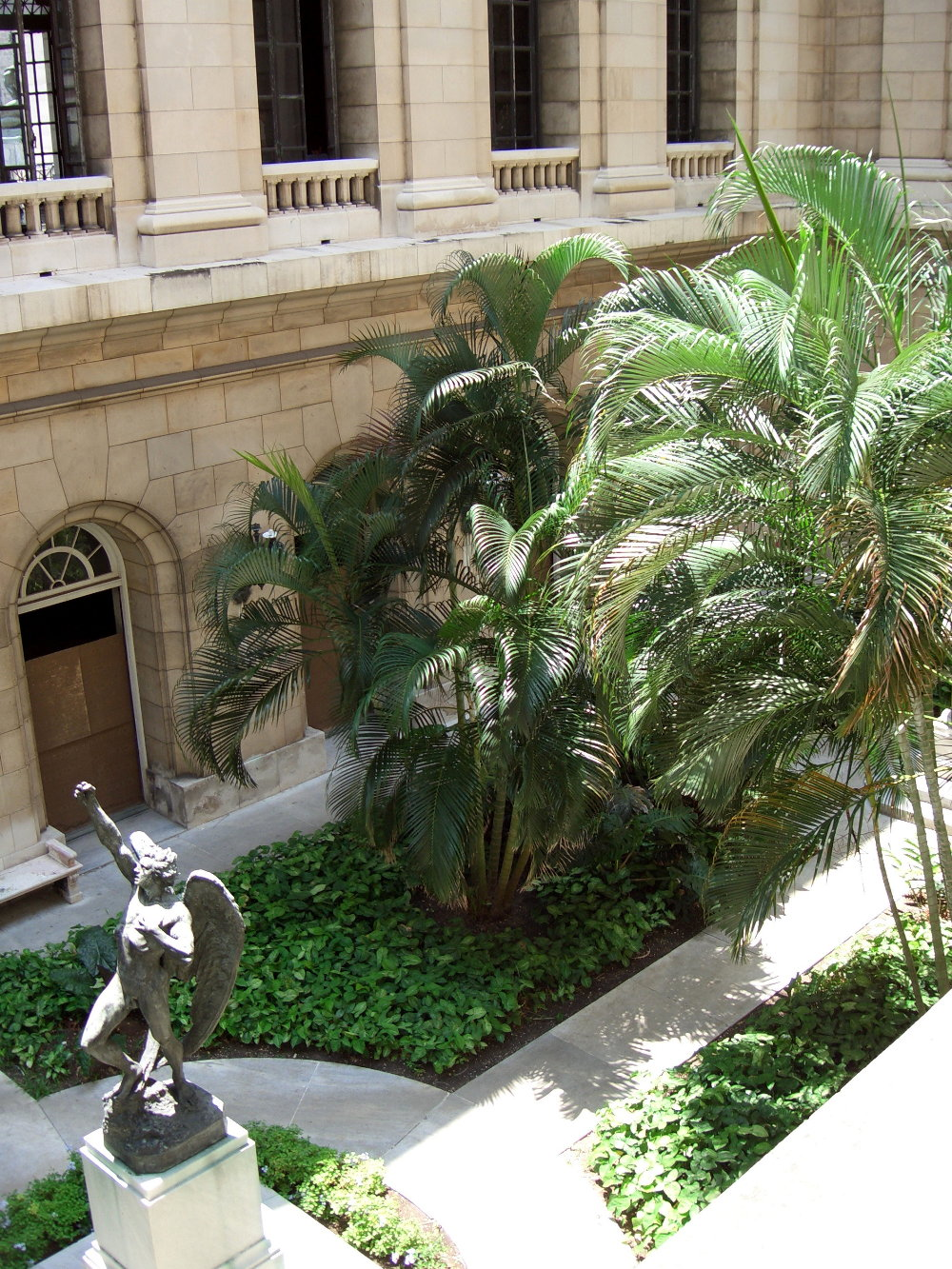
Inner courtyard at the north section of the Havana Capitol (Cuba). At the left, The Rebel Angel, a work by Italian sculptor Salvatore Buemi (1860–1916).

The inside of the main hall under the cupola is the Statue of the Republic (La Estatua de la República).

The statue, also by Zanelli, was cast in bronze in Rome in three pieces and assembled inside the building after its arrival in Cuba. It is covered with 22 carat (92%) gold leaf and weighs 49 tons. At 15 m (49 1/4 ft) tall, it was the second highest statue under cover in the world at the time, with only the Great Buddha of Nara being taller. The statue stands on a plinth 2.5 m (8 1/4 ft) high bringing the total height to 17.54 m (57 1/2 ft).

El Senado

Embedded in the floor in the center of the main hall is a replica 25 carat (5 g) diamond, which marks Kilometre Zero for Cuba. The original diamond, said to have belonged to Tsar Nicholas II of Russia and have been sold to the Cuban state by a Turkish merchant, was stolen on 25 March 1946 and mysteriously returned to the President, Ramón Grau San Martín, on 2 June 1947. To either side of the main hall is the Salón de Pasos Perdidos (Hall of Lost Steps), named for its acoustic properties. These halls, with inlaid marble floors and gilded lamps, lead to the two semicircular chambers that formerly housed the Parliament and Chamber of Deputies. A range of different lamps is seen throughout the building.

In the center of the building are two patios which provide light and ventilation for the offices on the first (ground), third and fourth floors. The north patio features another statue The Rebellious Angel (El Ángel Rebelde) which was donated to the building after the inauguration.

A wide granite staircase of 56 steps, 36 meters wide and 16 meters high, leads to the portico of the building. There are two rows of six columns of the Ionic order. The pillars stand out with a diameter of 1.55 meters and a height of 14.10 meters.

=== Statue of the Republic ===
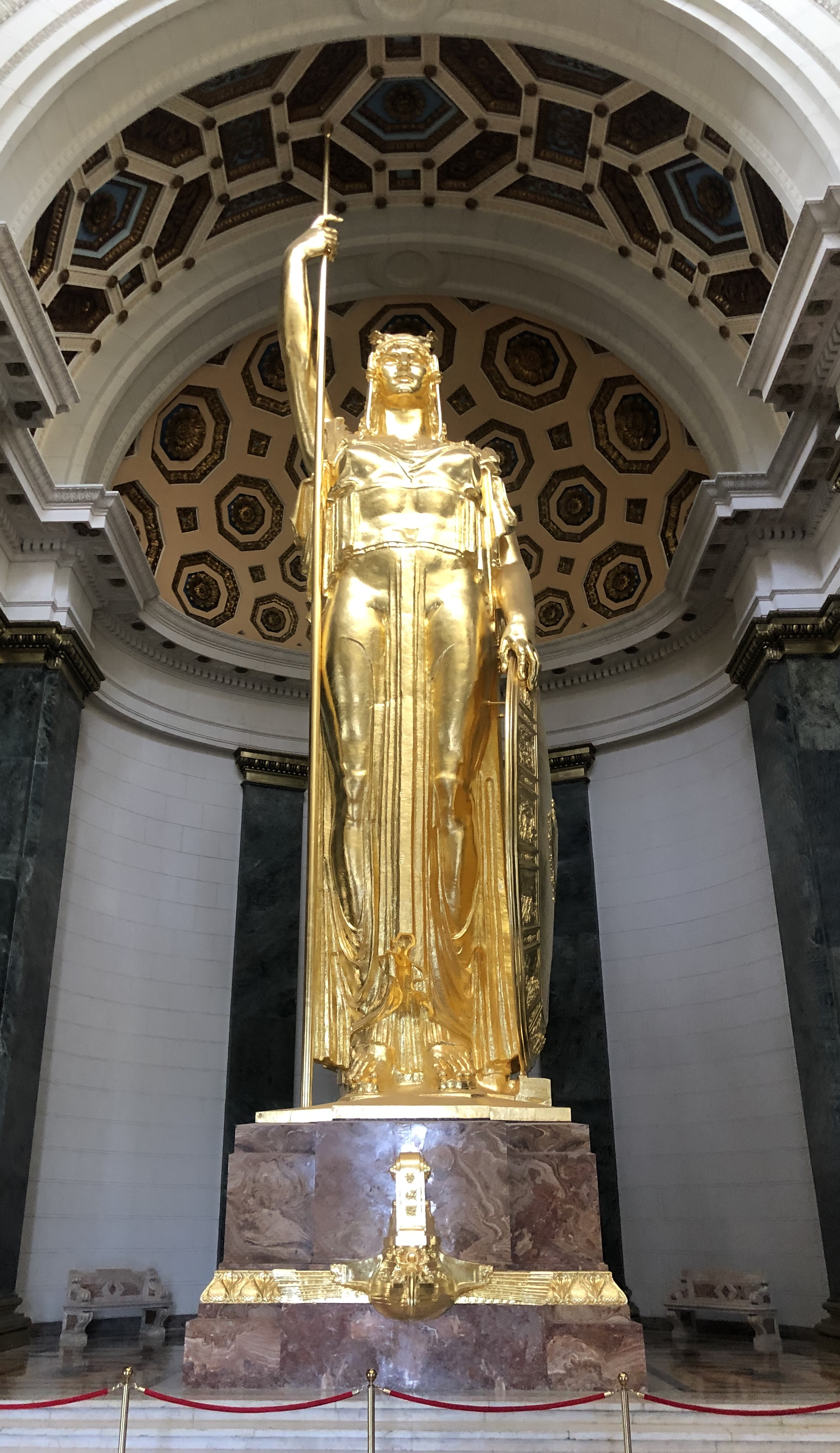
Statue of the Republic

Located in the apse, the Statue of the Republic is the figure of a young woman standing, dressed in a tunic, with a helmet, shield and lance; it weighs 30 tons, is 14.60 meters high, and rests on a marble pedestal of 2.50 meters. It was sculpted by Angelo Zanelli, author of the Altare della Patria, part of the monument to King Victor Emmanuel II, in Rome. It is the third largest indoor statue in the world, surpassed only by the Buddha of Nara, Japan and the Abraham Lincoln statue in the Lincoln Memorial in Washington. D.C.

== Gallery ==
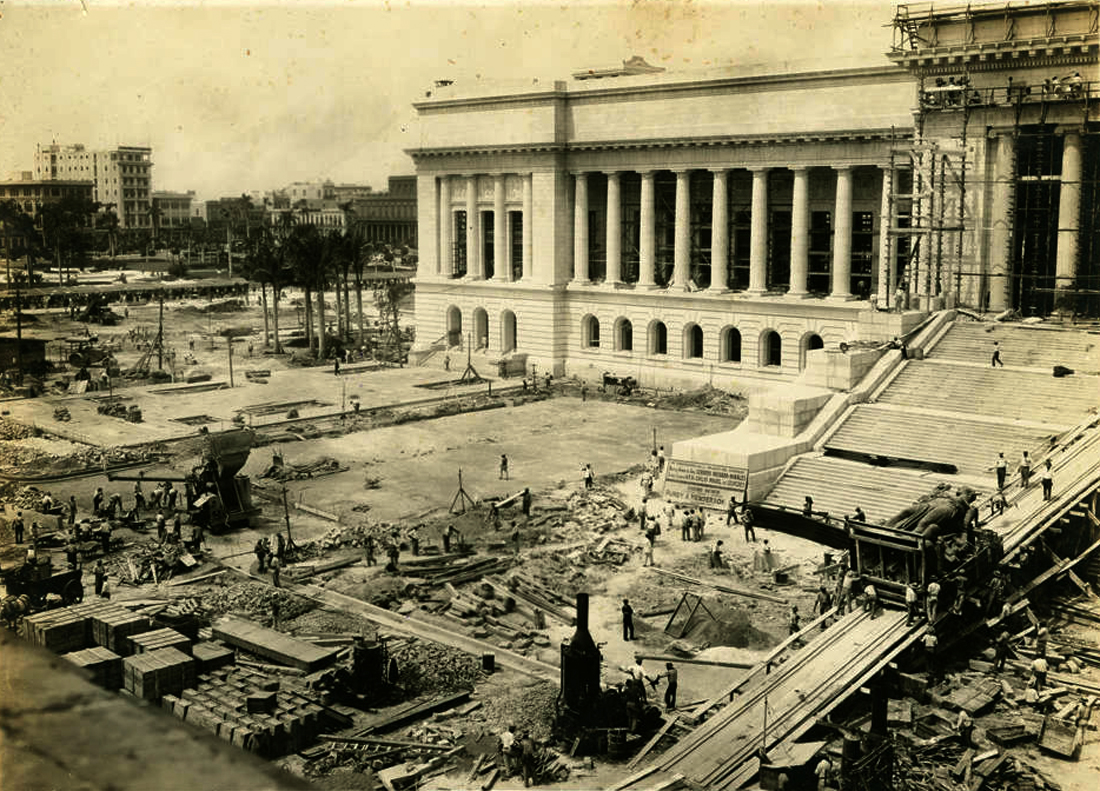
El Capitolio under construction in May 1929

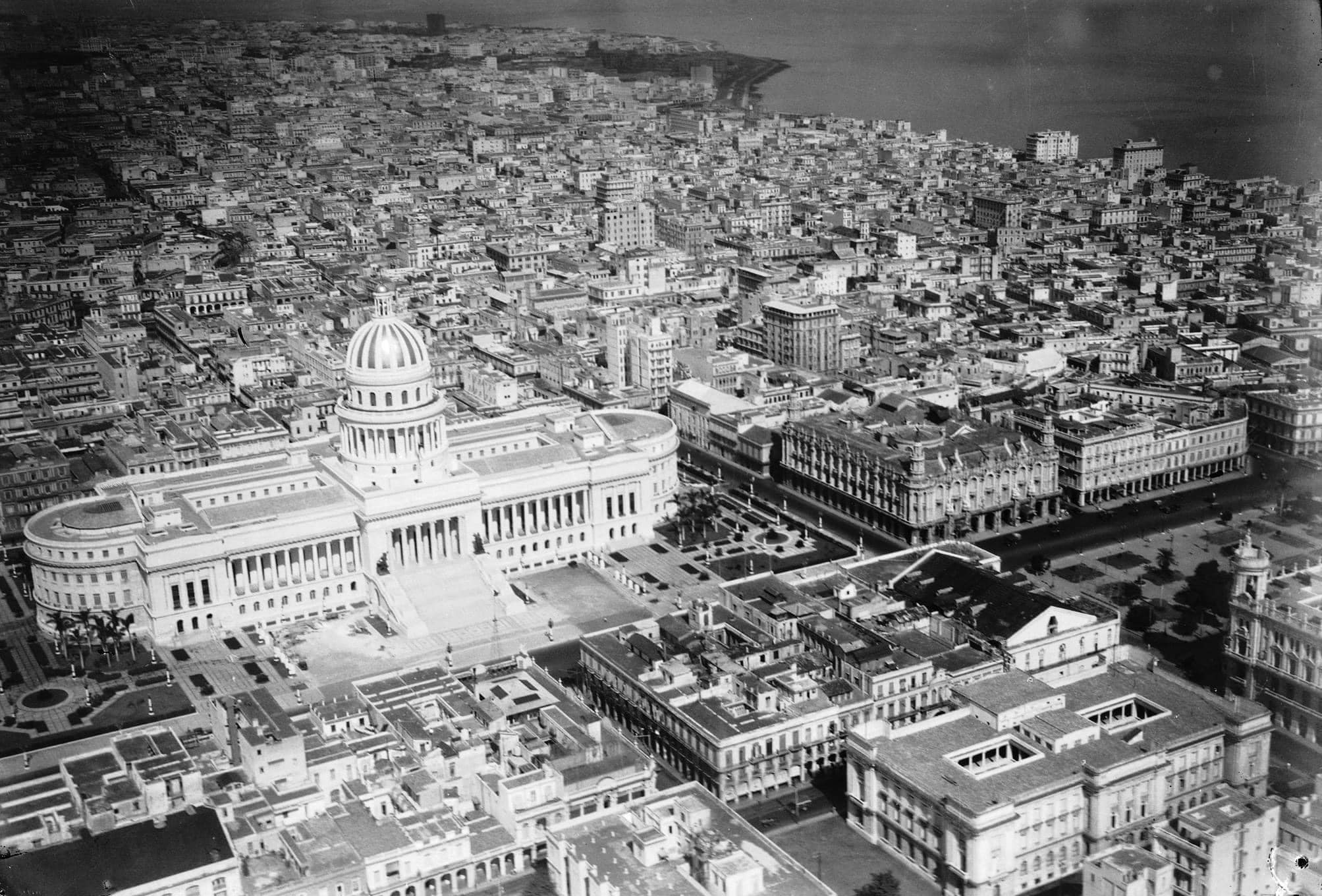
Aerial view (1940s)

La Cámara

The library

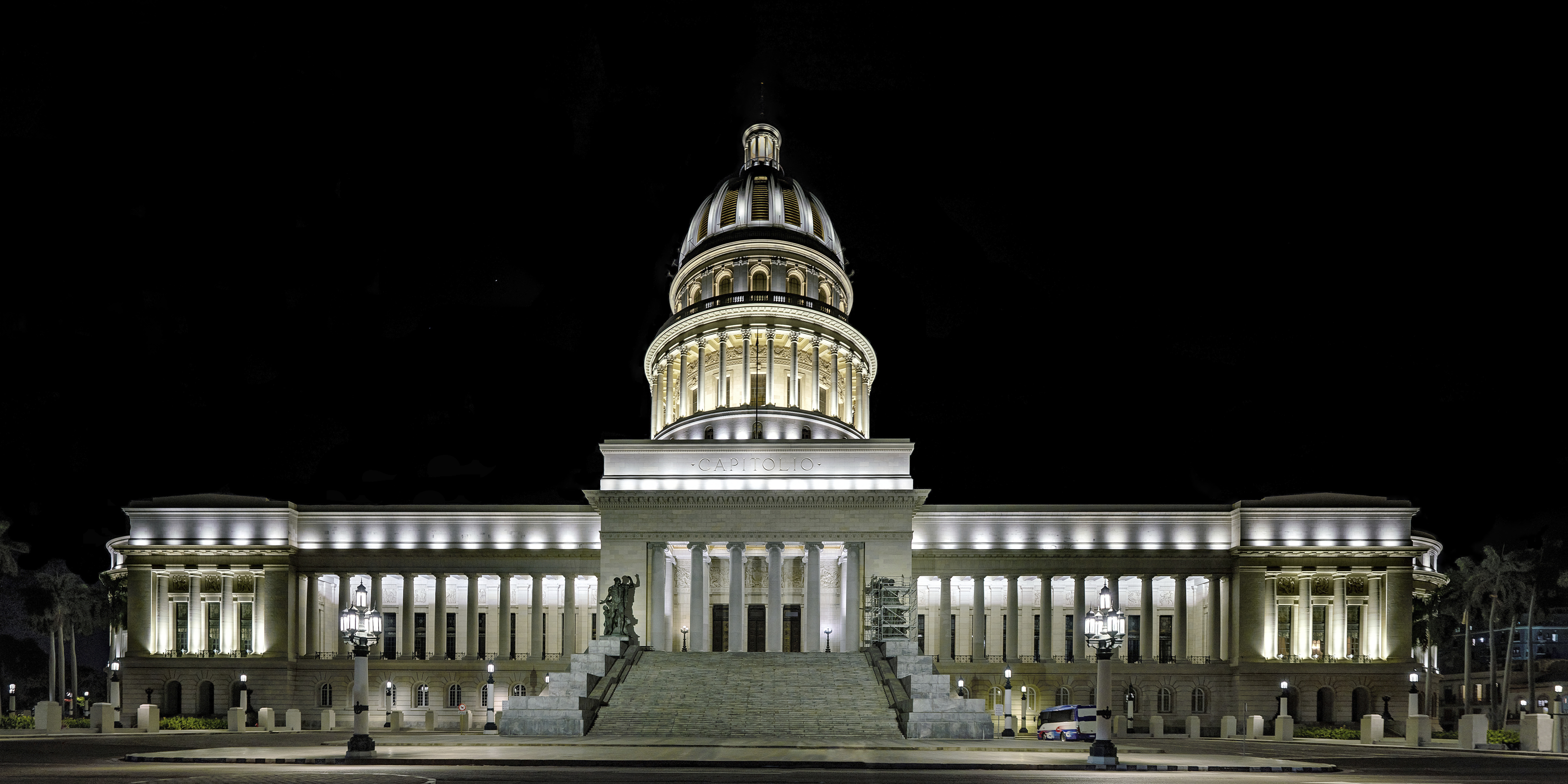
Eastern facade by night
