= Capitol station =

Capitol station may refer to:

- Broad and Capitol station, San Francisco, California
- Capitol station (Caltrain), San Jose, California
- Capitol station (VTA), San Jose, California
- Capitol Heights station, Capitol Heights, Maryland
- Capitol/Rice Street station, St Paul, Minnesota
- Robert Street station, St Paul, Minnesota, formerly known as Capitol East
- Capitol Hill station, Seattle, Washington
- Capitol South station, Washington, D.C.

== See also ==
- Capitol
