= Parliament Hill (disambiguation) =

Parliament Hill is a hill in Ottawa, Canada

Parliament Hill may also refer to:

- Parliament Hill (Quebec City), a hill in Quebec City, Canada
- Parliament Hill, London, a hill in north London, United Kingdom
  - Parliament Hill Fields, a park area in London
  - Parliament Hill Lido, a lido in London
  - Parliament Hill School, a school in London

== See also ==
- Capitol Hill (disambiguation)
- Capital Hill (disambiguation)
