= Capitol Hill (disambiguation) =

Capitol Hill is a neighborhood of Washington, D.C., adjacent to the United States Capitol.

Capitol Hill may also refer to:

== Australia ==
- Capital Hill, Australian Capital Territory, the location of Parliament House in Canberra

== Canada ==
- Capitol Hill, Burnaby, a hill and neighborhood in Burnaby, British Columbia
- Capitol Hill, Calgary, a neighborhood in Calgary, Alberta
- Capitol Hill Music, a Canadian record label

== Northern Mariana Islands ==
- Capitol Hill, Saipan, the location of the seat of government of the Northern Mariana Islands

== United States ==
- A metonym for the United States Capitol or the United States Congress
- Capitol Hill, Denver, a neighborhood of Denver, Colorado
- Capitol Hill, New Jersey, a neighborhood of Edgewater Park, New Jersey
- Capitol Hill, Oklahoma City, a neighborhood in Oklahoma City, Oklahoma
- Capitol Hill, an area of the West Portland Park neighborhood in Portland, Oregon
- Capitol Hill, Salt Lake City, a hill and neighborhood in Salt Lake City, Utah
- Capitol Hill, Seattle, a neighborhood of Seattle, Washington
  - Capitol Hill Autonomous Zone, a self-declared autonomous zone in Capitol Hill, Seattle
  - Capitol Hill station, a train station serving the neighborhood

== See also ==
- Capitol
- Capital Hill (disambiguation)
- Capitoline Hill, the original Capitol Hill in Rome, Italy
- Parliament Hill (disambiguation)
