= Capital theater =

Capitol theater (or theatre) may refer to:

== Theaters ==
- Capital Theatre (Bendigo), Australia
- Beijing Capital Theatre, China
- Capital Repertory Theatre, Albany, New York, US
- Capital Theater (Ely, Nevada), US

== Other uses ==
- Capital Theatre (band), a New Zealand rock band

== See also ==
- Capitol Theater (disambiguation)
