= Capital Center =

Capital Center or Capital Centre may refer to:

- Capital Centre (Abu Dhabi)
- Capital Centre (Landover, Maryland), a former sports arena in the United States
- Capital Center South Tower, Indianapolis, Indiana, United States

== See also ==
- Capitol Center (disambiguation)
