= Capitol Center =

Capitol Center or Capitol Centre may refer to:

- Capitol Centre, Singapore
- Capitol Centre, Cardiff, a shopping mall
- Capitol Center (Salem, Oregon), United States
- Capitol Center (Columbia, South Carolina), United States
- Hilton Baton Rouge Capitol Center, a hotel in Baton Rouge, Louisiana, United States
- Capitol Center for the Arts, Concord, New Hampshire, United States

== See also ==
- Capital Center (disambiguation)
- Capitol
