= Capital Hill =

Capital Hill may refer to:

- Capital Hill, Australian Capital Territory, the location of Australia's Parliament
- Capital Hill, Saipan (or Capitol Hill), the capital of the Northern Mariana Islands
- Capital Hill, Lilongwe, campus of Government Ministries of Malawi in Lilongwe, Malawi
- Capital Hill Residence, private home designed by Zaha Hadid and owned by Vladislav Doronin
- Capital Hill (album), a 1990 album by jazz saxophonist Buck Hill

== See also ==
- Capitol Hill (disambiguation)
- Capitoline Hill, the original Capitol Hill in Rome, Italy
