= Capitol, Scarborough =

Building in Scarborough, North Yorkshire, England

Coordinates: 54.2816°N 0.4036°W

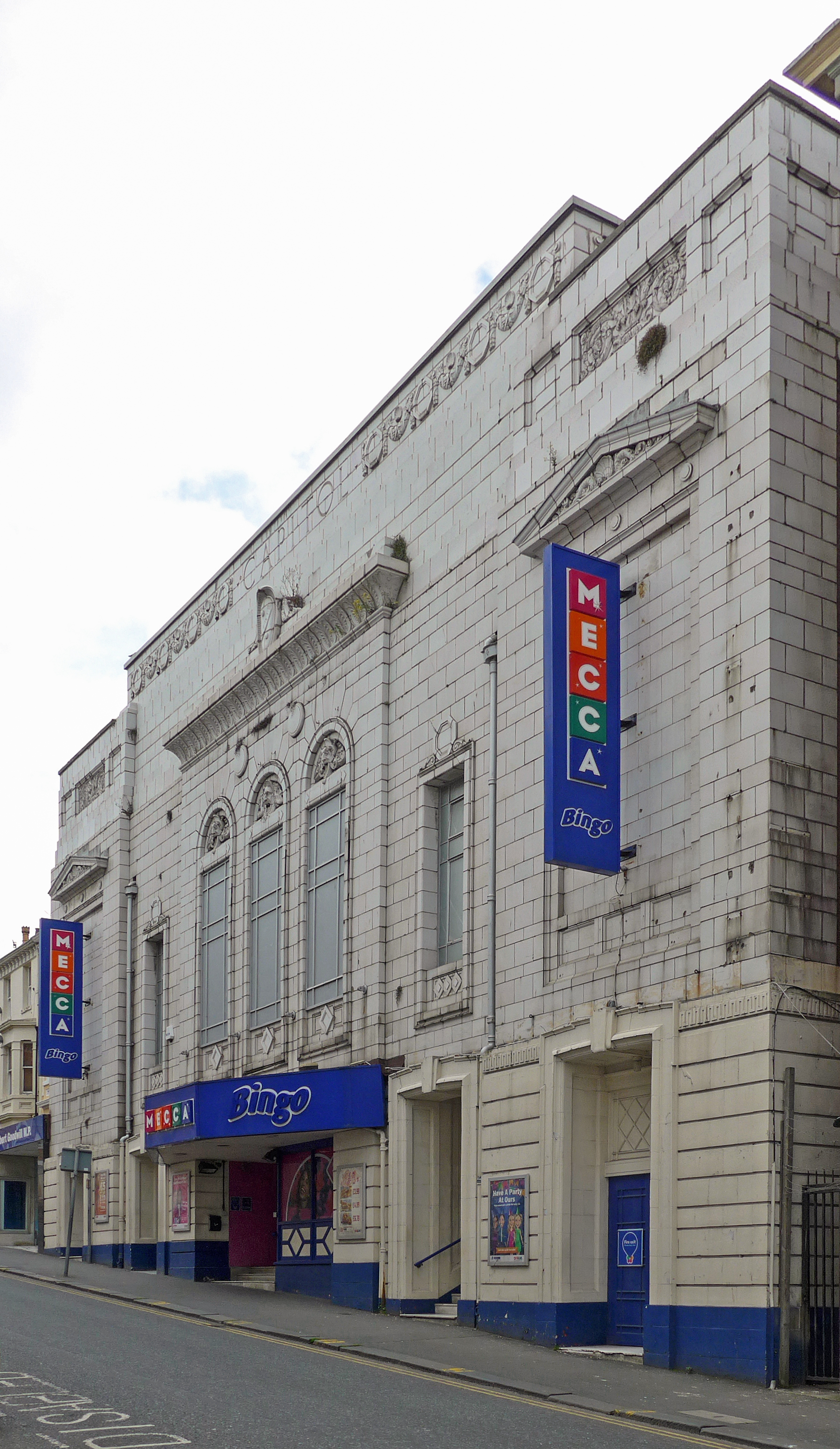
The building, in 2016

The Capitol is a historic building in Scarborough, North Yorkshire, a town in England.

The building was designed by Edwin Sheridan Evans and constructed between 1928 and 1929. It opened as a variety theatre with a fly tower, orchestra pit, dressing rooms and 2,100 seats, but was principally used as a cinema. In the 1970s, it was renamed as the "Classic Cinema", but this closed in 1977, and it was converted into a Mecca Bingo hall. The building was grade II listed in 2000. Closure of the club was announced in November 2025.

The building has a steel frame, the front is in white faience, on a plinth, and the other walls are in brick. Above the central entrance is a canopy and there are four more entrances with moulded surrounds and keystones. Above the main entrance are three tall round-headed windows, over which is a pediment with a coved cornice and a cartouche. At the top is a decorated frieze with central lettering. The interior retains much of its original decoration, including the proscenium arch with ornamental ironwork either side and a Classical frieze above. There is a barrel-vaulted ceiling. The original organ has been removed, and the former cafe at balcony level has been converted into an additional foyer.

== See also ==
- Listed buildings in Scarborough (Castle Ward)
