= Capitol Theatre (Woodstock, Ontario) =

Theatre in Woodstock, Ontario, Canada

Coordinates: 43.12969°N 80.76091°W

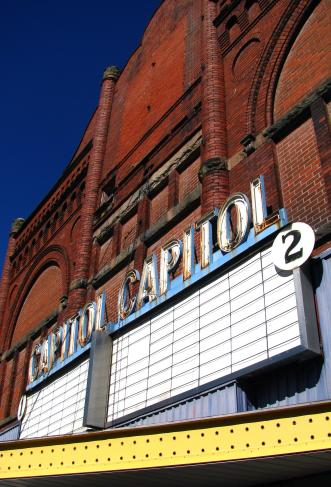
- Interactive map of Capitol Theatre
- Address: 385 Dundas Street; Woodstock, Ontario; Canada
- Capacity: 1400
- Current use: demolished

Construction
- Opened: 1893
- Closed: 1999

The Capitol Theatre was located at 385 Dundas St., Woodstock, Ontario, Canada. It was a popular theatre in its day which met its demise after sitting abandoned for many years.

== History ==
The Capitol Theatre, formerly known as the Woodstock Opera House, was built in 1893 at 391–395 Dundas Street, Woodstock. Owned and operated by John Griffin's Griffin Amusement Company of Toronto, it opened in 1908 as a 1,480-seat theatre that included a balcony and balcony boxes, and could mount stage as well as silent movie shows. In the early 1900s, it had the largest stage (23 × 60 feet)[CONVERSION NEEDED] between Windsor and Hamilton. Although silent films were shown regularly, with a six-piece orchestra in a pit before the stage to provide accompaniment, touring stage shows also made routine and popular visits. Every summer a stock company would visit for several weeks, putting on a different play each night. The local YMCA also had a singing group, Y Beaver Minstrels, that performed there to packed houses. During the intervals, 11- and 12-year-old YMCA members would be drafted to walk up and down the aisles selling Cracker Jack as a fundraiser.

The same building had earlier housed the 1,075-seat Opera House, owned by a local businessman, Thomas Carter, and built in 1893.

Former Canadian prime minister Sir Wilfrid Laurier and opposition leader Sir Robert Borden each presented their views in the early 1900s at the theatre.

=== Renaming ===
In 1927, Famous Players Ltd. bought the Woodstock Opera House, renamed it the Capitol Theatre and soon began showing the first talkies. In 1940, The Capitol was sold to another local businessman, Tom Naylor, who made extensive upgrades, including adding an up-to-date sound system and fireproofing the projection booth: the nitrate-based film then used was very flammable, unlike the safety film in use today. However, live stage performances were still popular and vaudeville was a part of every Saturday evening show until 1956.

=== Modern Movie Era ===
The balcony was converted into a second and separate theatre, called the Capitol 2, in 1975.

== Closing and demolition ==
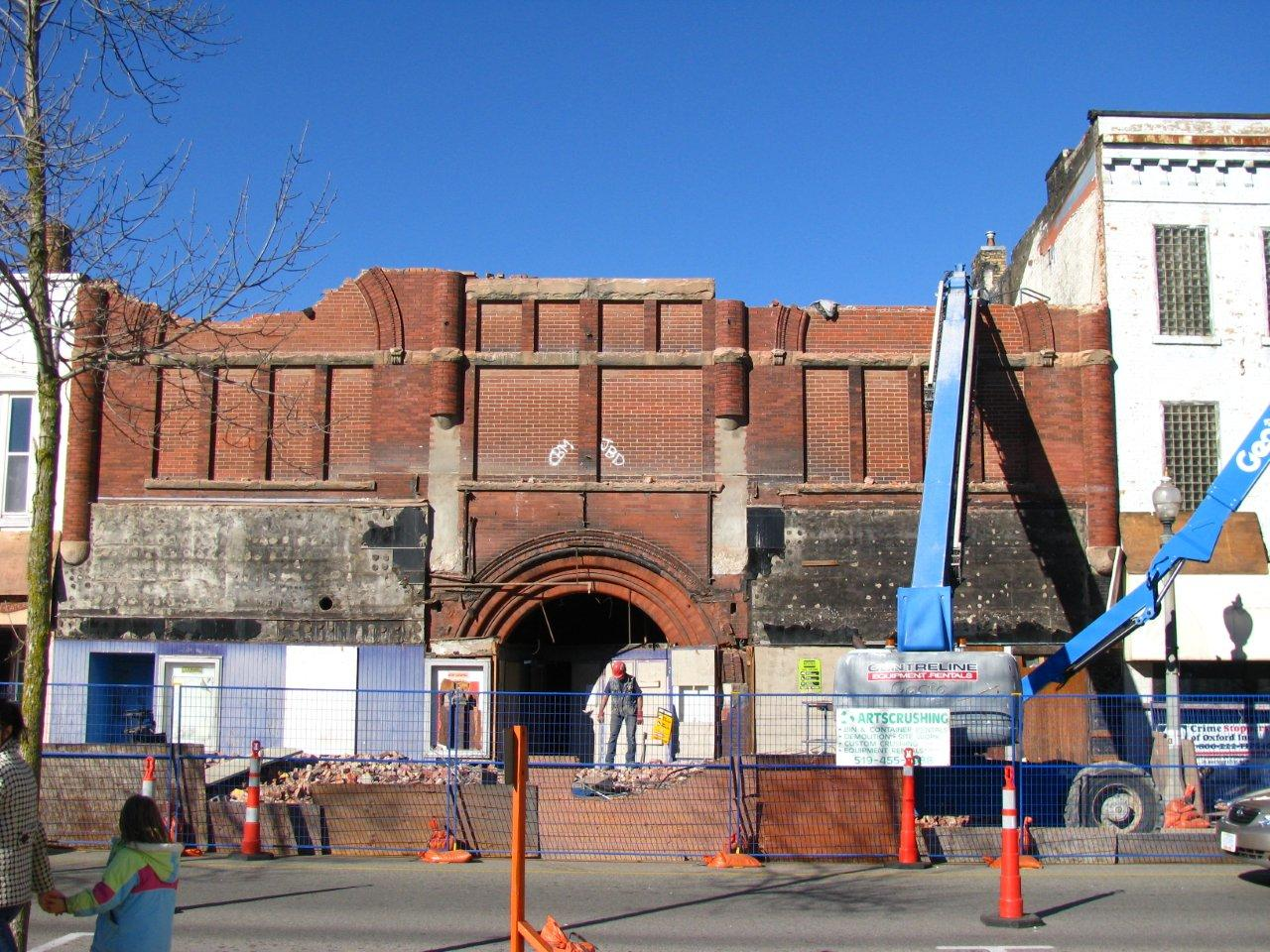
The Capitol Theatre meeting its ultimate demise.

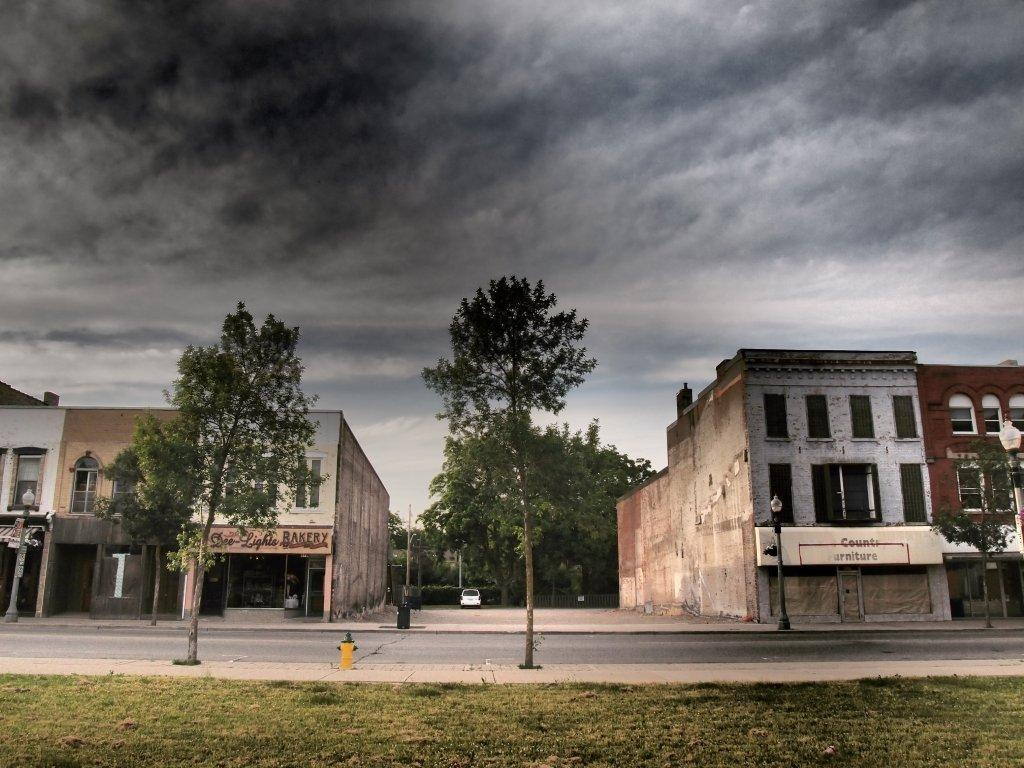
The former Capitol Theatre site in 2011.

The Capitol closed in 1999, after which it sat abandoned and in disrepair. The concern for maintaining the historic theatre came to the attention of the Woodstock city council. Resident Bert Taylor spoke to council about the concern, saying the building had seen historical events and famous people within its walls but faced an absentee landowner with little interest for celebrating that history. Taylor wanted council to designate the building as a heritage property.

Taylor also mentioned the former opera house and movie theatre was the site of an election debate in 1911 between Sir Wilfrid Laurier and Sir Robert Borden—a precursor to the election Borden subsequently won.

The Sentinel-Review published an article in 2004 where Terry DeCosta said he intended to convert the property to a dinner theatre. However, the property was only stripped of its internal elements of value and was left idle.

The City of Woodstock issued a demolition order to the owners of the Capitol Theatre in June 2010. According to the city the building had experienced a "major roof collapse in the middle of the building" and "the last exterior walls remain standing and unstable." The theatre was demolished later that year.

== Notes and references ==
1. https://jimbenderoxford.blogspot.com/2010/06/woodstock-capitol-theatre-to-be.html
2. http://cinematreasures.org/theater/23378/
3. https://web.archive.org/web/20120311034916/http://www.woodstocksentinelreview.com/ArticleDisplay.aspx?e=1772407
4. http://www.uer.ca/locations/show.asp?locid=26946
