= The Capitol (Fayetteville, North Carolina) =

- U.S. National Register of Historic Places
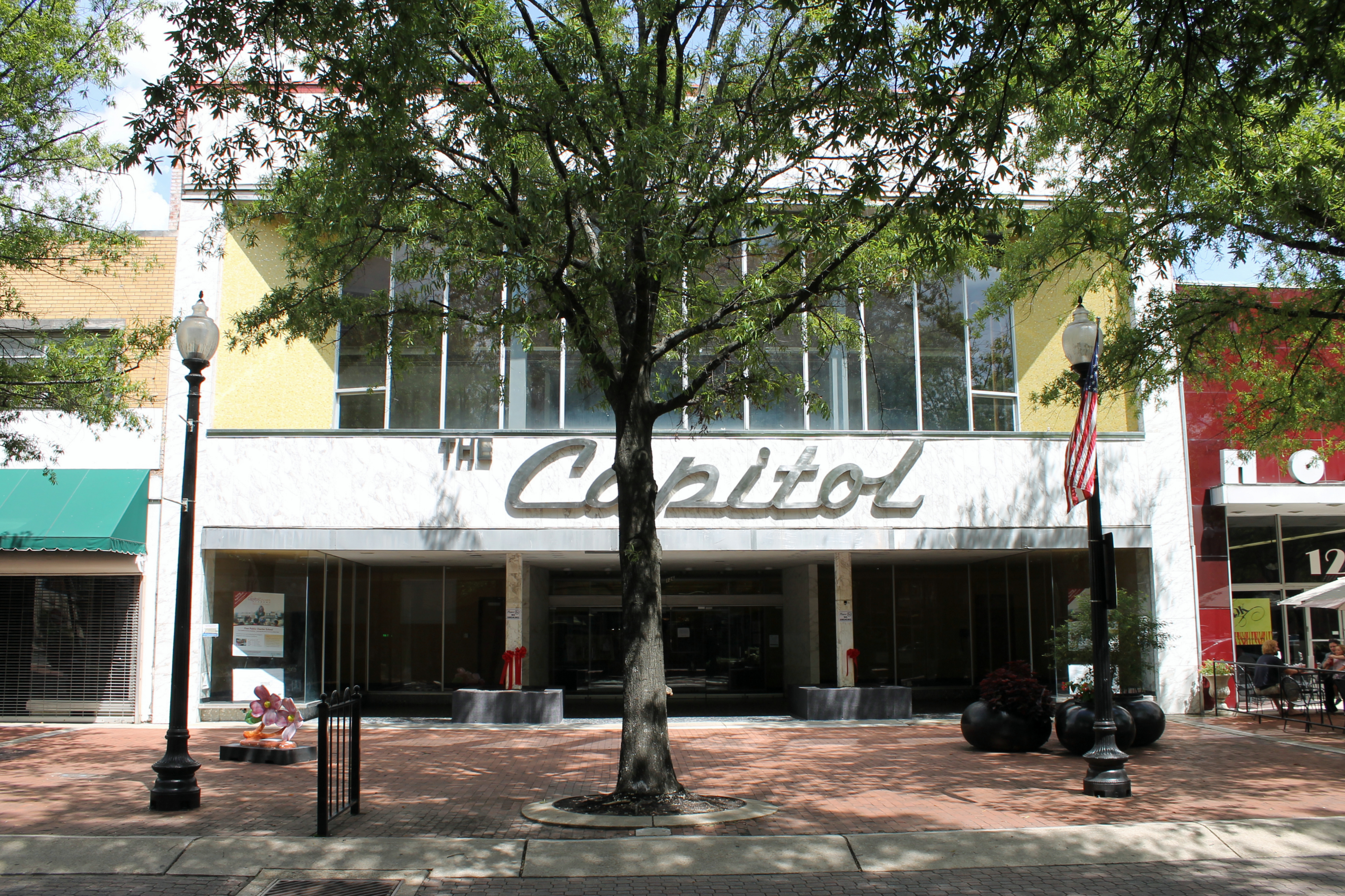
- The Capitol, September 2014

- Location within North Carolina Location within the United States
- Location: 126 Hay St., Fayetteville, North Carolina
- Coordinates: 35°3′18″N 78°52′45″W
- Area: less than one acre
- Built: 1949, 1955
- Built by: Rieneke, E.W.
- Architect: Litwack, Herman C.
- Architectural style: Modern Movement
- NRHP reference No.: 05000376
- Added to NRHP: May 4, 2005

The Capitol, also known as The Capitol Department Store, is a historic department store building located at Fayetteville, Cumberland County, North Carolina. The original store was established at this site in 1921, with an existing two-story building incorporated into it in 1936. In 1949, the existing building was doubled in size by a large rear addition. The most notable feature is the 60-foot (18 m) wide Modern Movement storefront added in 1955. It features marble facing, a recessed storefront, a large convex full-height window in the second story, and large aluminum script lettering for The Capitol. The Capitol, the last department store remaining in downtown Fayetteville, closed in March 1990.

It was listed on the National Register of Historic Places in 2005.
