= Hargray Capitol Theatre =

Theatre in Macon, Georgia, US

Coordinates: 32°50′12″N 83°37′43″W

The Capitol Theatre, is located in downtown Macon, Georgia, United States, on 382 Second Street. The Capitol Theatre serves as a live entertainment venue.

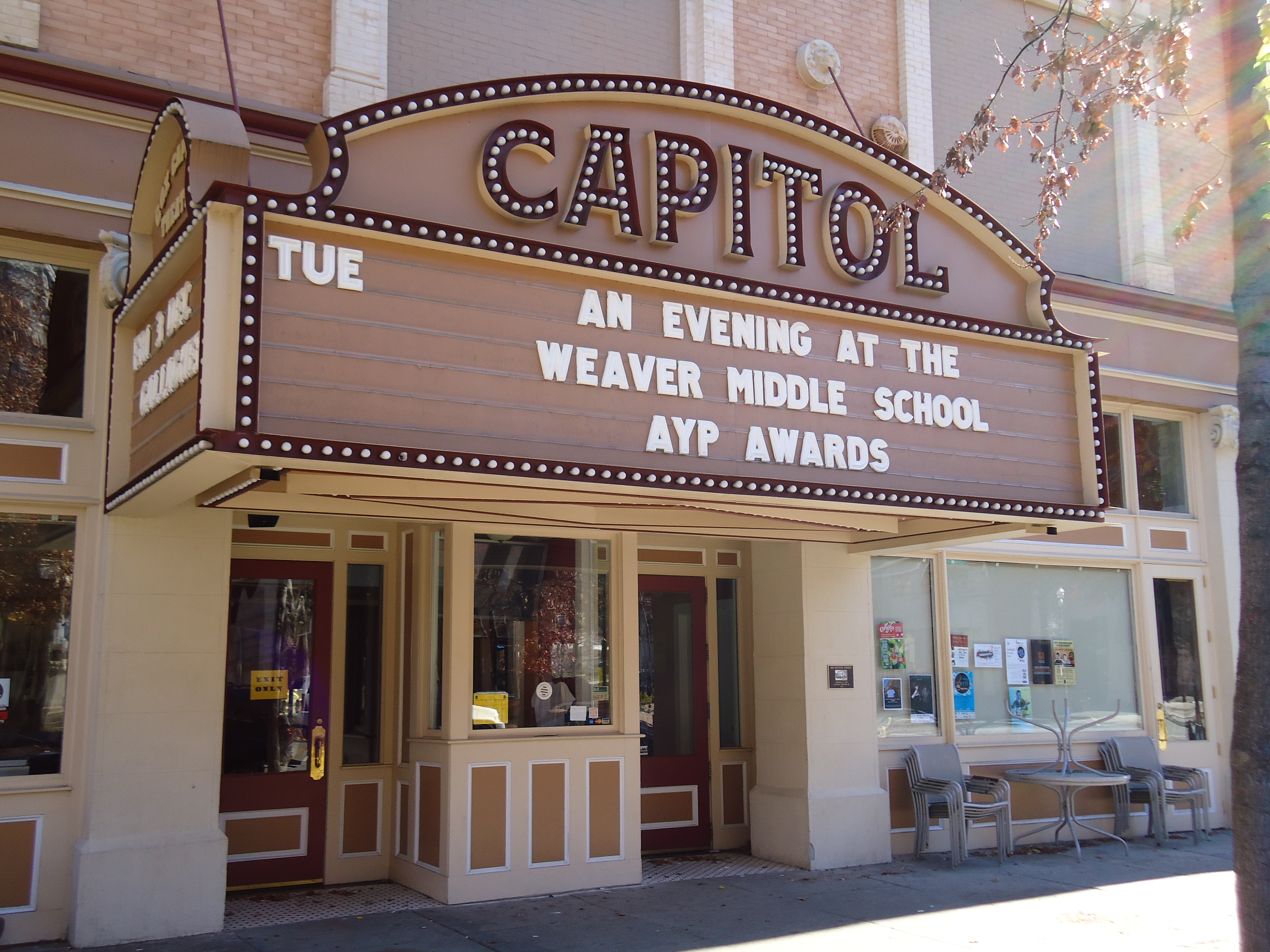

== History ==
Commercial Savings and Loan was the first building located at 382 Second Street. It was built in 1897, but closed shortly after. In 1900, Strong Shoe Company purchased the building and resided there for 15 years. According to the Macon Daily Telegraph, the Cox was converted into a movie theater in 1917 and was officially opened to the public." In 1917, The Capitol Theatre became the first public venue to offer air conditioning. After 58 years, the Capitol Theatre closed in 1975. The venue reopened in 2006 as a movie house and concert venue. In 2013, The Moonhanger Group – owners of downtown dining favorite The Rookery, beloved H&H Restaurant, and acclaimed farm-to-table restaurant Dovetail – entered a long-term management agreement with the Theatre.

== Today ==
A man named Tony Long had a vision for downtown Macon, Georgia. He led a group of people and launched a $1.2 million renovation to restore the Cox Theatre. According to Kap Stann's book called "Moon Georgia," the Capitol Theatre reopened in 2006 as the Cox Capitol Theatre as a live entertainment venue.

The Theatre serves as Macon's venue for: concerts, from rock bands to first-class musical tours; second-run movies, such as vintage and independent films; and film festivals.

Today the theatre works hard to support events that will continue the rock n roll music legacy of Macon, Ga. One of the largest events sponsored and held at the Capitol Theatre is the Bragg Jam Music Festival. This late summer festival brings in bands from all over the country on top of supporting local artists.

== Rentals ==
The Capitol Theatre serves as a rental space for events such as receptions, parties and fundraisers.

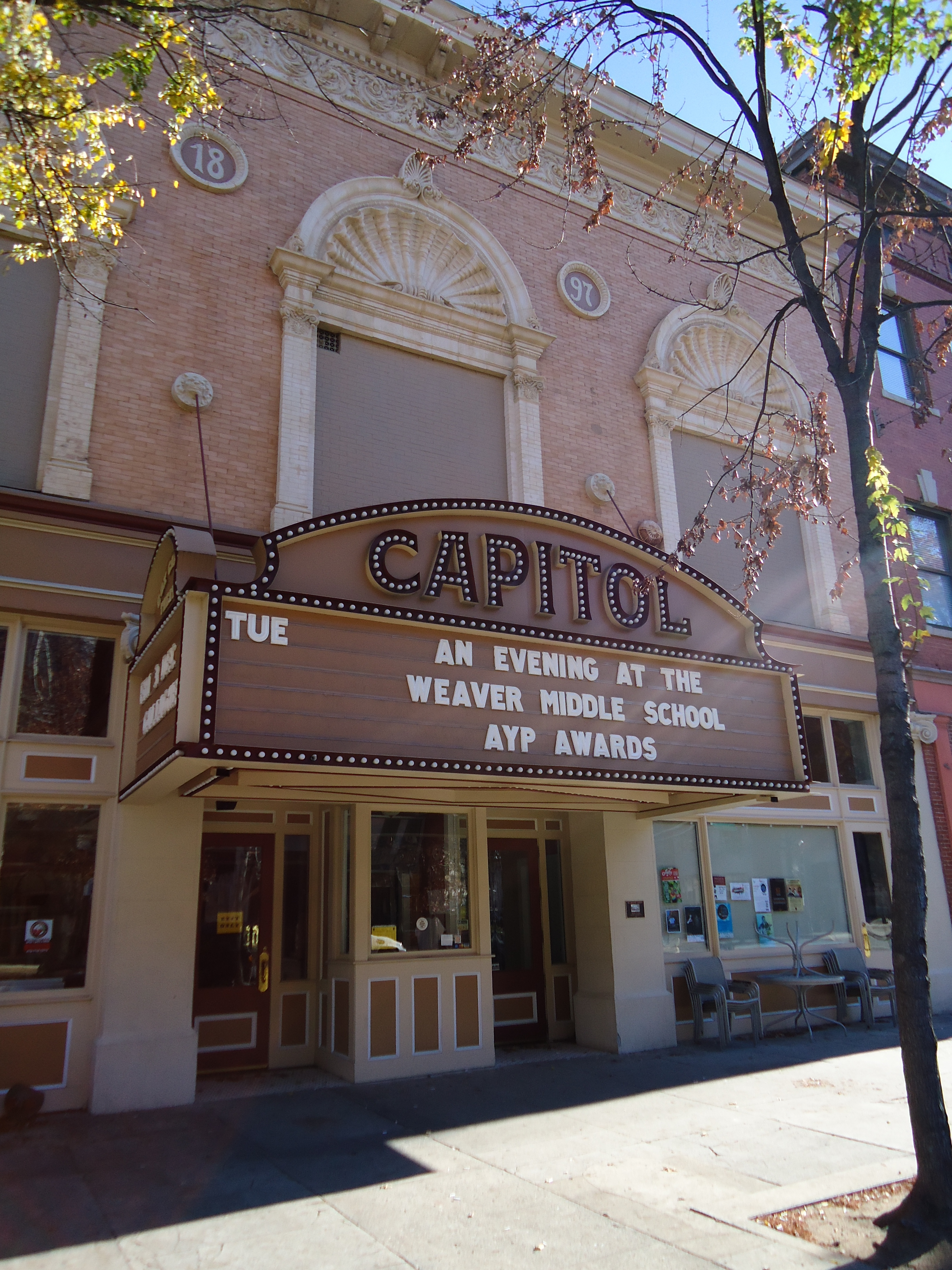

The Capitol Theatre has an open floor plan on the bottom level. Their second level features a balcony with seating for 297. This gives the theatre an overall capacity of 650.

== Timeline ==
- August 1927: $8,000 permit issued for Capitol repairs
- October 1930: due to the closing of the Rialto, the Capitol becomes the number one theatre in Macon for first-run movies.
- May 1946: the Capitol gets renovations which include air conditioning and candy and popcorn bars.
- April 2006: Cox Communications donated $300,000 to sponsor a lighted theatre marquee that replicates the one that was on the building when it first opened in 1916.
- 2013: The Moonhanger Group took over operations of the theatre.
