= Capitol Theatre Center =

Theater in Chambersburg, Pennsylvania

Coordinates: 39.9349°N 77.6621°W

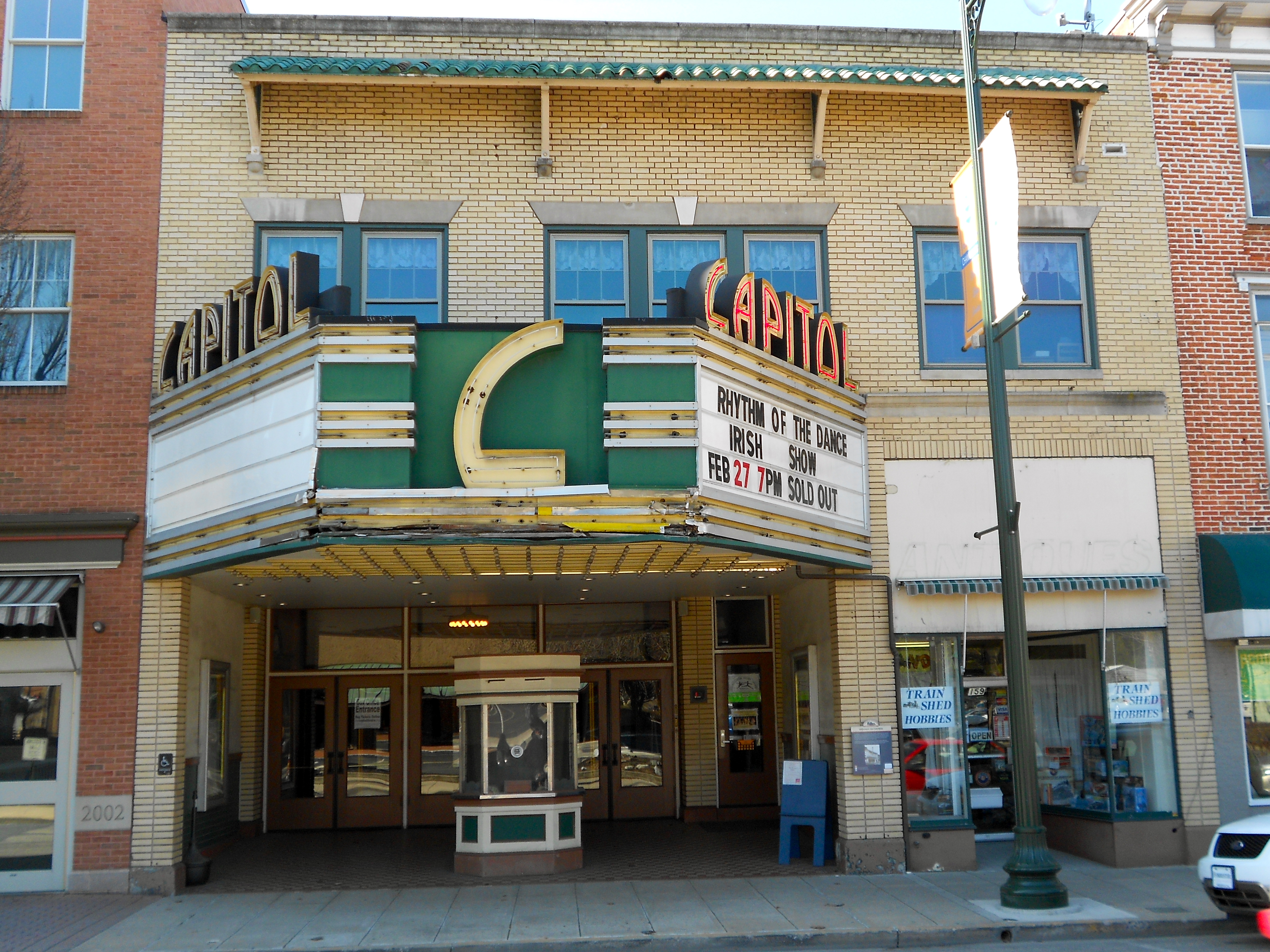
- Main theater entrance
- Interactive map of Capitol Theatre Center
- Address: 159 South Main Street; Chambersburg; U.S.A.
- Owner: The Capitol Theatre Foundation
- Capacity: 805 plus 4 wheelchair spots

Construction
- Opened: 1927
- Years active: Since 1927

Website
- www.thecapitoltheatre.org

The Capitol Theatre Center is a theater located at 159 South Main Street in downtown Chambersburg, Pennsylvania, located midway between Gettysburg, Pennsylvania and Hagerstown, Maryland. The Capitol Theatre Center opened as a movie theater on February 3, 1927. Following renovations in 1996 the Capitol now operates as a community arts center. It is funded through the Capitol Theatre Center Foundation. The Capitol Theatre Center is one of the few theaters in the United States to still have its original organ, a Möller theater pipe organ. The Capitol Theatre Center is the home of all performances done by the Chambersburg Community Theatre.

== History ==
The Capitol was developed in 1926 by the Pottstown, PA Theatre Company. The PA Theatre Company wanted to add to the rapidly growing number of movie theaters. The Quigly Hafer construction company was hired to build the theatre. It was completed in only nine months and opened on February 3, 1927. At the time, the Capitol Theatre Center was the most technically advanced theatre in the area. In 1948, the Capitol Theatre Center went through a thorough renovations that included the addition of air conditioning. The major goal of the renovations was to transform the theatre from a movie theatre to a performing arts center, which would allow them to target a more diverse cultural audience.

=== Restoration ===
In 1996, the Capitol Theatre Center underwent a seven-year restoration that was completed in 2003. The name of the theatre was changed to Capitol Theatre Center and was envisioned to be the main theater in Chambersburg. The Capitol Theatre Center now featured an improved stage and a completely renovated auditorium. The main floor was leveled and resurfaced; the stage was enlarged and extended, and the dressing rooms were redecorated. A hydraulic lift was added for the organ console, lighting boxes were installed in the auditorium, and 524 new seats were installed, including 8 wheelchair spaces. In the balcony of the theatre, walls were repainted and the seating platforms were reconstructed. On the first floor, wheelchair accessible bathrooms were built and offices were added for the Capitol Theatre Center management.

Along with the renovations came the introduction of the Chambersburg Council for the Arts, Caledonia Theatre Company, Chambersburg Ballet Theatre School, the Wood Center Stage Theatre, and the Chambersburg Community Theatre. Today, the Capitol Theatre Center hosts performances by these groups as well as concerts and fundraising events.

== Building Tenants ==
- Chambersburg Ballet Theatre School & Company

The Chambersburg Ballet Theatre Company presents professional quality ballet performances by its dancers and guest artists at the Capitol Theatre. The Chambersburg Ballet Theatre School provides 14 levels of classical ballet classes for those ages four to 60. The Chambersburg Ballet Theatre School offers fun and challenging classes for men, boys, women, children, and the elderly. Not limiting themselves to ballet classes, the Chambersburg Ballet Theatre School has summer camps, contemporary modern and jazz styles, character dances, and a Saturday Adult “Stretch and Relax” mat class.

- Chambersburg Council for the Arts

The Chambersburg Council for the Arts' gallery hosts local and national artists, and art classes for students age six through adult. The Council also presents Missoula Children's Theatre and is a community partner in Chambersburg's annual IceFest.

- Chambersburg Community Theatre

It all started in 1954 when a group of actors put on a production of "The Male Animal." In 1974, the Chambersburg Community Theatre gained nonprofit status. The Chambersburg Community Theatre performed drama's such as The Wizard of Oz and The Glass Menageire. The Chambersburg Community Theatre has not always been a part of the Capitol Theatre. First, the theatre was located at Central Jr. High School, then at the Rosedale Theatre, then Faust Jr. High School and soon back to Central Jr. High School, then to the Capitol Theatre, and then to Wilson College. Now the Community Theatre is back at the Capitol Theatre and has been for the last 20 years.

== Events ==
Each year, The Capitol Theatre performs multiple shows. The 2013 through 2014 events include Mommie and Me morning classes on Wednesdays from 10-11am @ the Capitol, American Boy Choir, The Tamburitzans from Duquesne University, Rhythm of the Dance Show from Ireland, Bo Bice, California Dreaming, III Tyme Out with Russell Moore. Plays included; And Then There Were None, Annie, You Can't Take It With You, Peter Pan. Ballets Included Swan Lake, Romance of the Dance, Little Mermaid, Dickens Christmas Musical.

== Facilities ==
=== Wood Center Stage Theatre ===
The Wood Center Stage Theatre is a multipurpose room located on the second floor of The Capitol Theatre Center. The Wood Center Stage Theatre can be rented for corporate or social events including, receptions, business meetings, or theatrical events.

=== Organ ===
The Capitol's Möller Theatre Organ was installed in 1927 when the theater first opened. The Capitol Theatre Center was the first theater in the area to have a pipe organ. It was played by Wilford Binder until 1952. The organ is Möller's Opus 4800, which contains 14 ranks of pipes, played on a three manual console. In 1989, a fourth manual was added. After being donated by former Capitol Theatre Center owners Gordon and Marlene Madison, the organ is now regularly used for community events.

== Donations ==
The Capitol Theatre Center is a non-profit organization that survives mainly off of donations.< To keep the Center up and running, the Capitol Theatre Center created the Capitol Theatre Center Foundation.
