= FOCSA Building =

Skyscraper in Havana, Cuba

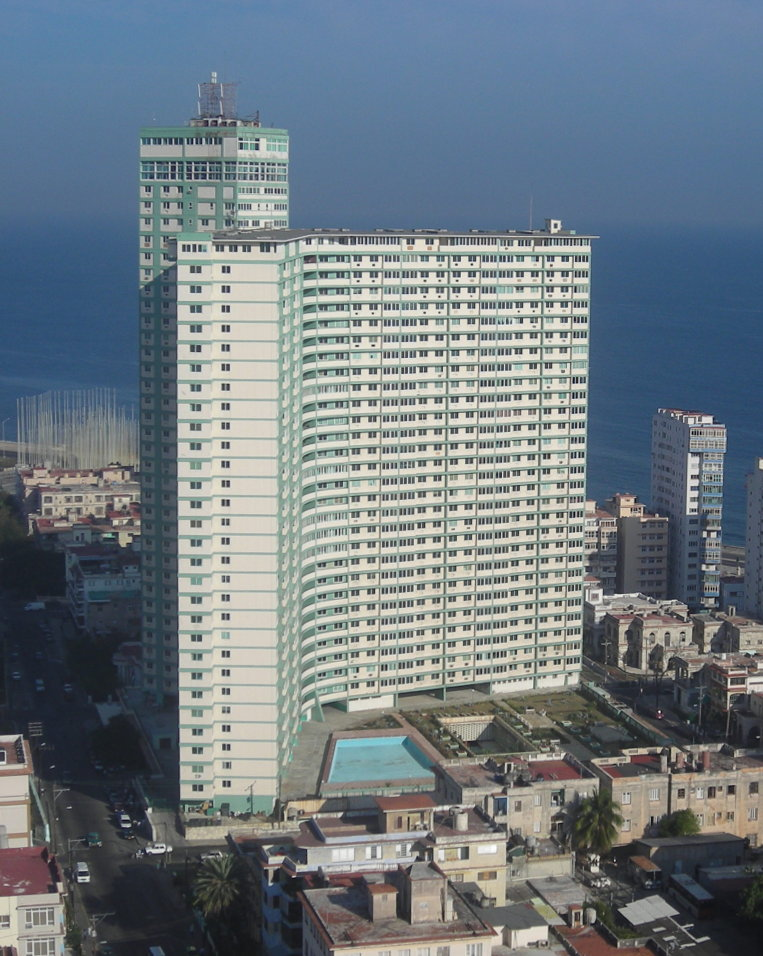

General information
- Status: Completed
- Type: Residential
- Architectural style: Modern
- Location: El Vedado, 17 y M, Havana, Cuba
- Coordinates: 23°08′34.4″N 82°23′02.7″W
- Construction started: February 1954
- Completed: June 1956
- Cost: 7,000,000 pesos
- Owner: Revolutionary government

Height
- Height: 121 meters (397 ft)

Technical details
- Structural system: Wall and slab
- Material: 48,000 kPa (7,000 psi) concrete
- Size: 280 mm (11 in) wall, 171 mm (6.7 in) slab
- Floor count: 39
- Floor area: 77,000 m^{2} (830,000 sq ft) (res)
- Lifts/elevators: 4 tenant + 2 service
- Grounds: 10,000 m^{2} (110,000 sq ft)

Design and construction
- Architects: Martín Domínguez Esteban, Ernesto Gómez Sampera
- Developer: Fomento de Obras y Construcciones, Sociedad Anónima; FOCSA
- Engineer: Sáenz, Cancio & Martín
- Structural engineer: Luis Sáenz Duplace
- Services engineer: Gustavo Becquer, mechanical Fernando H.Meneses, electrical
- Civil engineer: Bartolome Bestard and Manuel Padron

Other information
- Number of rooms: 374 apartments
- Parking: 500 cars

The FOCSA (Note: Acronym for Fomento de Obras y Construcciones, Sociedad Anónima, the name of the developer.) Building is a residential and commercial skyscraper in the Vedado neighborhood of Havana, Cuba. At 121 meters (397 ft), it was the tallest building in Cuba for nearly 7 decades until the construction of the Torre K (or Torre López-Callejas) in 2025. It was named after the contracting company Fomento de Obras y Construcciones, Sociedad Anónima, and the architects were Ernesto Gómez Sampera (1921–2004), Mercedes Diaz (his wife), and Martín Domínguez Esteban (1897-1970), who was the architect of the Radiocentro CMQ Building. The structural engineer was Luis Sáenz Duplace, of the firm Sáenz, Cancio & Martín, and professor of engineering at the University of Havana. (Note: Ernesto Gomez Apera and Martin Dominguez later collaborated on the Workers' District of the Commercial Employees' Pension Fund in Guanabacoa, completed in 1959.) The civil engineers were Bartolome Bestard and Manuel Padron. Gustavo Becquer and Fernando H.Meneses were the mechanical and electrical engineers, respectively. It is located on a site bordered by Calles 17 and M and Calles 19 and N in the Vedado.

== History ==
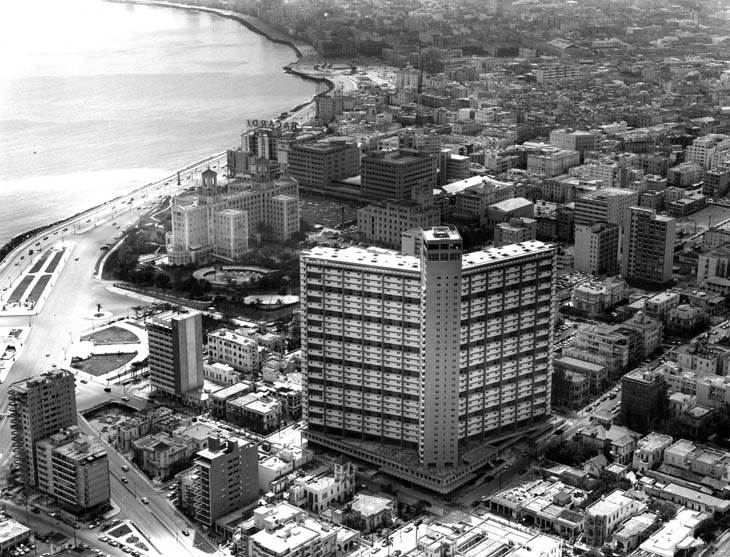
Aerial view of the FOCSA Building seen from the west showing the floating corridors, circa 1958.

The building was built between 1954 and 1956, is 121 metres (394 feet), and located in the Vedado section of Havana. In 1952 the CMQ Radio and TV Network located at Calle Rampa and M in el Vedado planned to provide administrative offices, a radio station and housing for employees. CMQ selected a 10,000-square-metre (110,000 sq ft) plot of land costing approximately (Note: "In the year 1952 those plots of land were purchased by the radio and television chain CMQ at a cost of 700.000 pesos aiming at building houses for artists and employees.") 700,000 pesos. The company Fomento de Hipotecas Aseguradas (FHA) financed 80% of the cost of the residences and 60% of the commercial shops. El Banco Continental Cubano granted a credit of 6 million pesos.

Work began in February 1954 and finished in June 1956. At the time of construction it was the second-largest residential concrete building in the world, second only to the Martinelli Building in São Paulo, Brazil. It surpassed the López Serrano Building in height, which had been Cuba's tallest building.

In the early 1960s, middle-class owners of residential floor units in the building had their properties nationalized by the current government. In the 1970-1980s the building housed Soviet and Eastern bloc specialists and advisors and the ground store supermarket was for non-Cubans only. In 2000 an elevator cable snapped killing one person. In the 2000s the building was repainted and renovated and much of the building was given over to temporary housing of foreign guest workers, primarily from Venezuela.

== Construction ==
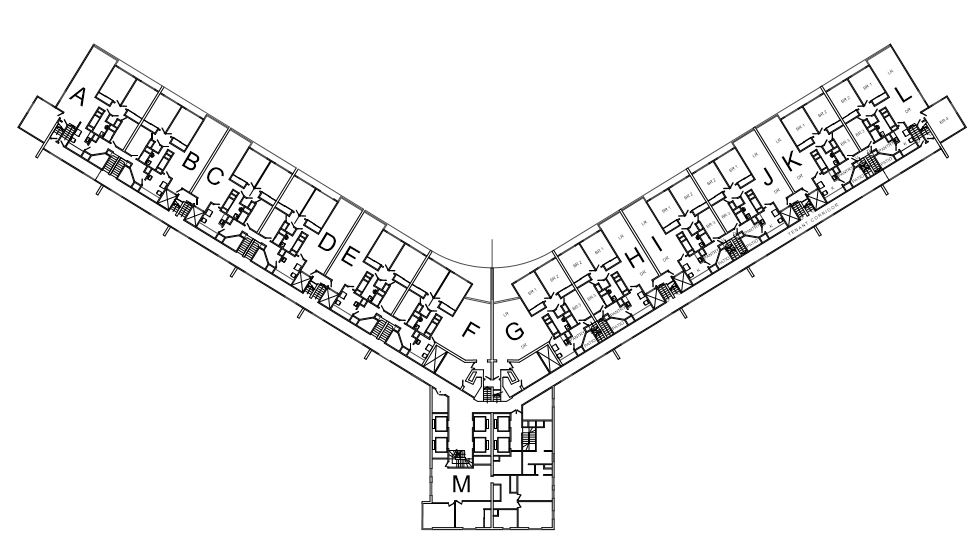
FOCSA Building Typical Floor Plan.

The building rises to a height of 121 m (397 ft) above its footings; 280 mm (11 in) bearing walls separate the apartments and in turn support the 171 mm (6.7 in) reinforced concrete slabs at each level. The bearing walls are solid and have no openings except at the basement and lobby floors to facilitate access between rooms. There is an additional concrete mass at the center of the Y, (apartments F and G), to increase resistance to lateral forces. The walls extend through the rear wall to support the corridors. The wall and slab structural system form a three-dimensional lattice resisting horizontal forces. A high strength concrete mix from 21,000 kPa (3,000 psi) to 48,000 kPa (7,000 psi). was used. The tower and corridors show prefabricated panels on the exterior. Reinforced concrete columns support the podium and the stories below. The residential block, the 'Y,' is supported by 13 280 mm (11 in) walls. There are coral tiles on the ground floor. (Note: Many buildings in Havana are constructed out of coral stone including the Colegio Nacional de Arquitectos de Cuba, the promenade of El Prado, and the San Carlos and San Ambrosio Seminary.)

The building was chosen in February 1997 by the Unión Nacional de Arquitectos e Ingenieros de la Construcción de Cuba (UNAICC) as one of the seven wonders of Cuban civil engineering.

== Area distribution ==
The FOCSA has 39 floors 4 of which are dedicated to commercial use; two floors are for parking. 28 floors have 13 residences each. The 34th floor has six penthouses on a plinth made possible by the structural walls which stop below this floor. Each penthouse is the size of two apartments (A+B, C+D, E+F, etc.). The penthouses have a dedicated elevator and patio-courtyards open to the sky. All apartment floors are terrazzo on cinders.

The site is divided into three parts:

1. A shallow, mixed-use “wall and slab” Y of 35 floors above a base.
2. The podium of outdoor amenities including two swimming pools and a club for guests and tenants. The podium covers the entire site.
3. Four floors of building services, commercial spaces, and parking for 500 cars located below the podium.

Apartments are a one-half level up or down from the service and tenant corridors. A typical floor contains 13 apartments; five have two bedrooms and a maid's room. The cost of the apartments was $21,500 for the larger units in the center and $17,500 for the smaller ones. An additional $30 per floor was charged the higher up in the building the unit was located; the highest apartments were the first to be sold.

Located in the tower are the building's four tenant and two service elevators and two sets of stairs. One of the service elevators is dedicated to the restaurant and the observation floor. The other service elevator is for the apartments and is linked to the service corridors. The tower also contains offices on the 37th floor for the restaurant, “La Torre,” on the 38th floor and an observation room on the 39th floor.

The podium contains a clubhouse, and offices and swimming pools for adults and children. It has gardens, lighted paths, and benches. There is a ramp to the street located at the corner of 19th and M; the podium was used as a staging area during the construction of the project. Below the podium at the fourth level are building offices.

=== Porte-cochere ===
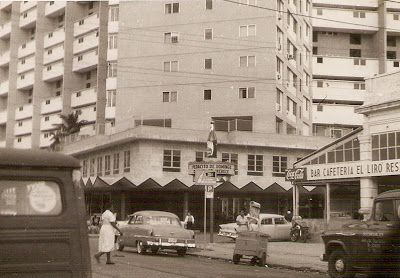
Calles M and 17, FOCSA building entrance.

Marked by a two-lane covered porte-cochѐre at street level is the building's entrance. Inside is the building desk, a large waiting area, and the tenant elevator lobby. The restaurant “El Emperador,” and a supermarket, a bank, a post office, theaters, and two radio stations are also located on the ground floor. (COCO and Radio Metropolitana) There are various cafés situated around the perimeter of the site and along a double-loaded corridor traversing the site from Calle M to N. Light filters to the interior corridor from openings in the podium. On the second floor are the administrative offices for the building.

=== Corridors ===
The wall of the apartments extends through the rear wall to form the support of the corridors on the exterior. The corridors are separated vertically from each other by approximately twenty inches to provide for apartment ventilation and view to the west. There are three sets of service and tenant corridors every other floor. The center corridor is for service to the building; the other two corridors are for tenants. The service and tenant corridors are undifferentiated on the exterior, except that the service corridors are shorter in length; this reflects the location of the service stairs of the end units, A and L. Service and tenant corridors are located at different heights. From each apartment, the exit stair goes up to the tenant corridor and down to the service corridor. There was a private elevator in the initial design to each apartment (X on the plan), however it was never installed.

== Ventilation ==
The 510 mm (20 in) separation of the floating corridors allows for cross ventilation of the apartments and views to the west. The dropped ceiling over the bathrooms and maid's room allow for natural ventilation to flow through the apartments. (Note: all closet and bathroom doors have ventilation grilles at the top and bottoms for air circulation; originally, there was no air conditioning in the FOCSA building thus relying on a system of natural ventilation) Closet doors have vent grilles on their tops and bottoms to allow for air circulation.

== Penthouses ==
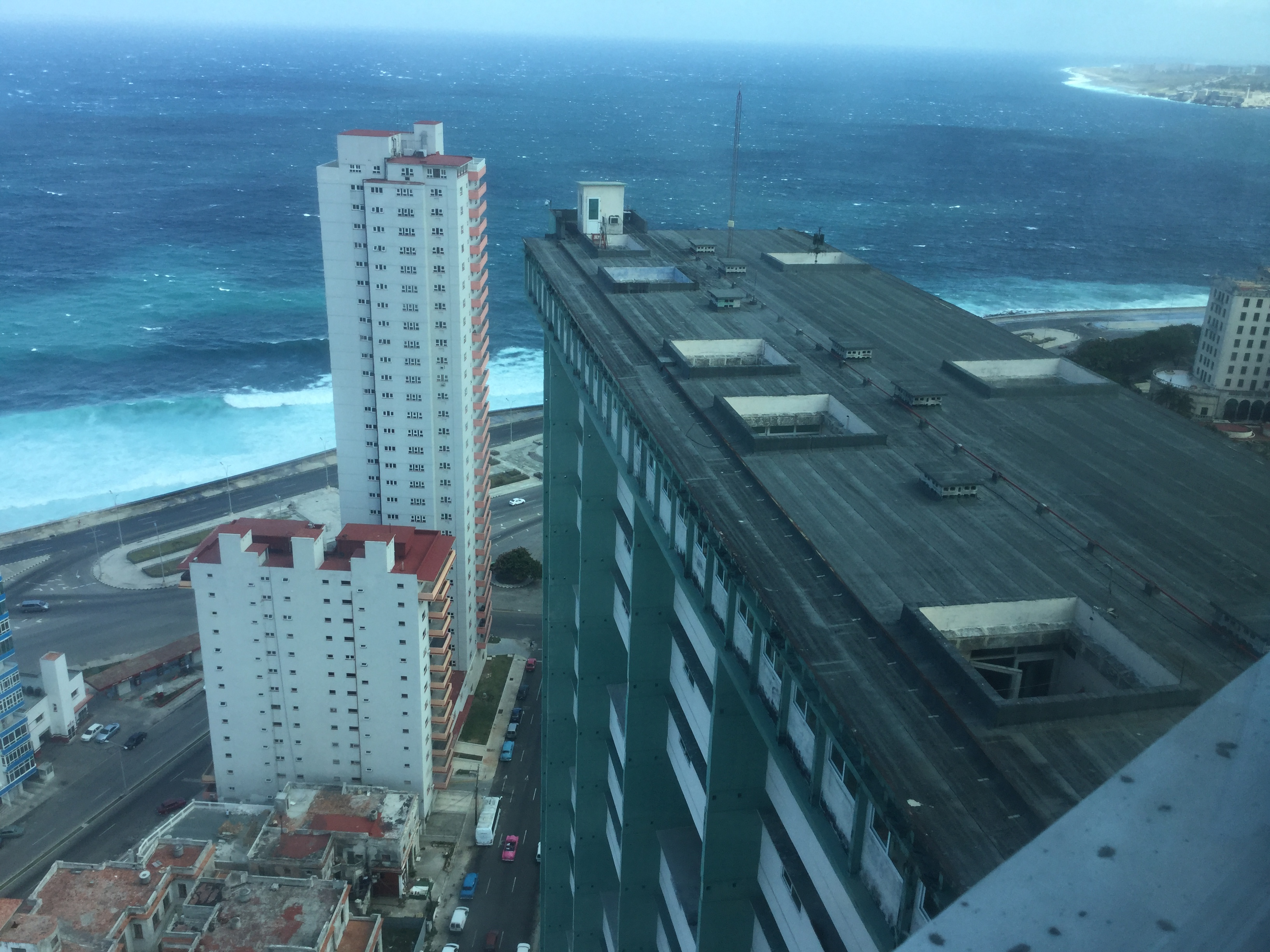
Roof showing penthouse courtyard openings

Penthouse apartments have a "patio" that is open to the sky with access to water that is located next to the kitchen.

One penthouse on the south side of the FOCSA Building appears in the 1968 film Memories of Underdevelopment, written and directed by Tomás Gutiérrez Alea. It features as the apartment of the protagonist Sergio Carmona Mendoyo, played by Sergio Corrieri.

== Gallery ==
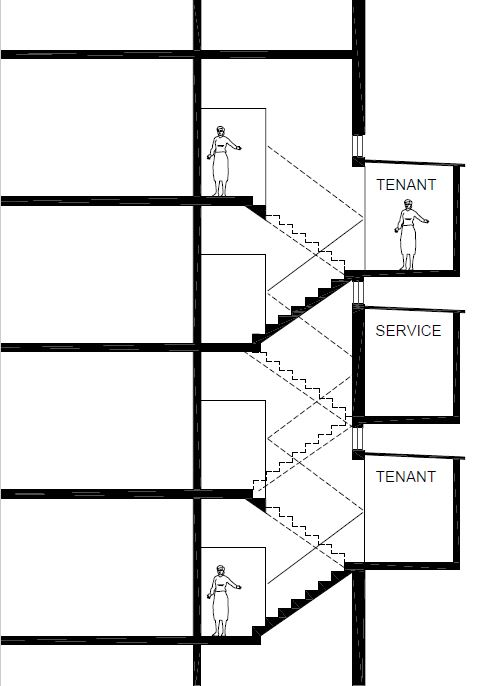
Service corridor, the section at tenant stairs.

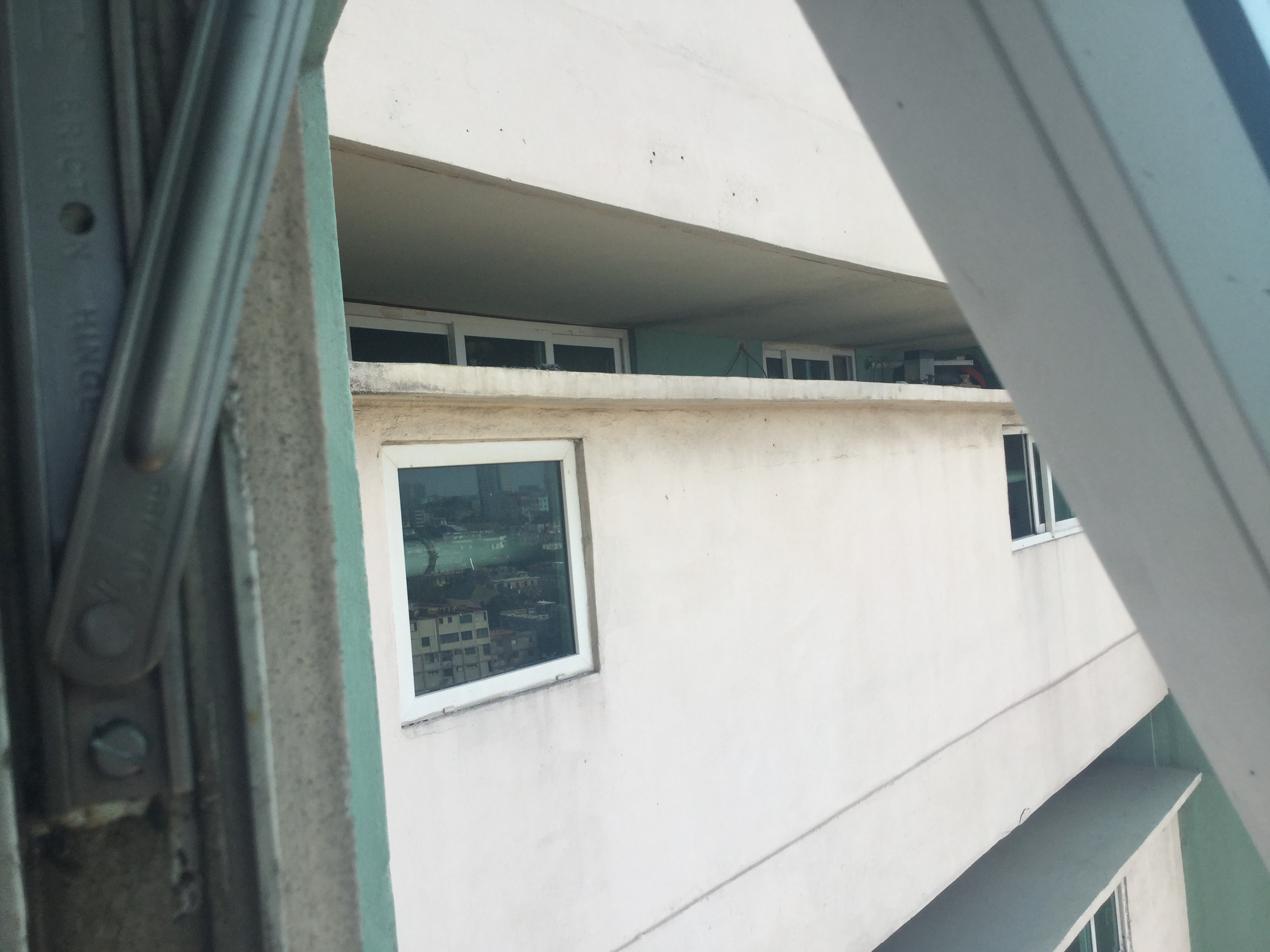
20 in (510 mm) separation between corridors showing apartment windows.

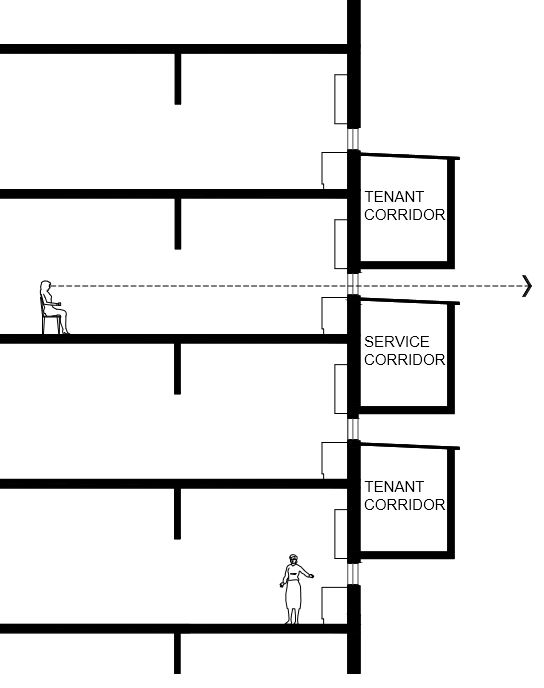
20 in (510 mm) separation of corridors for ventilation and views.

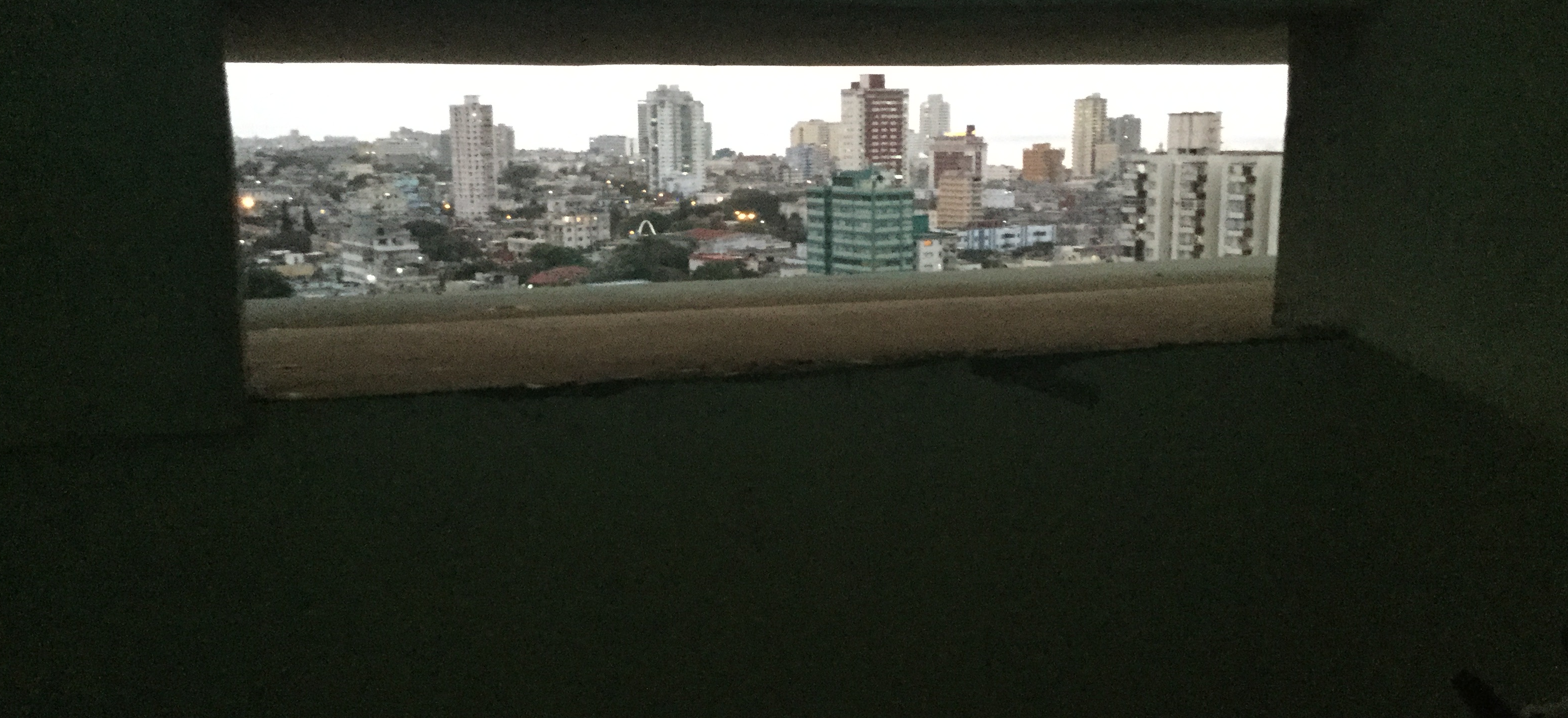
20 in (510 mm) separation between service and tenant corridors.

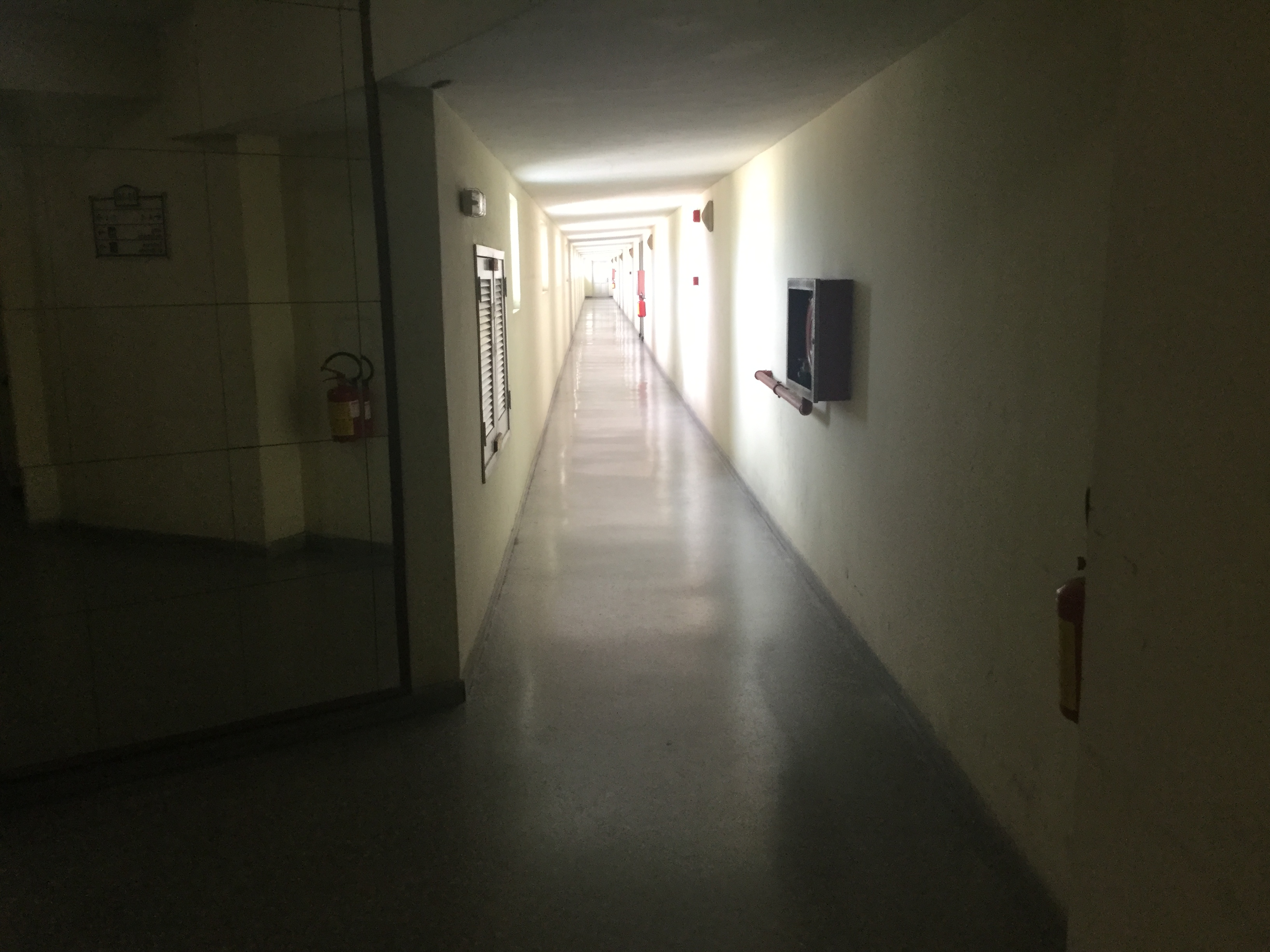
Tenant corridor, looking north. Alternates in section with service corridors.

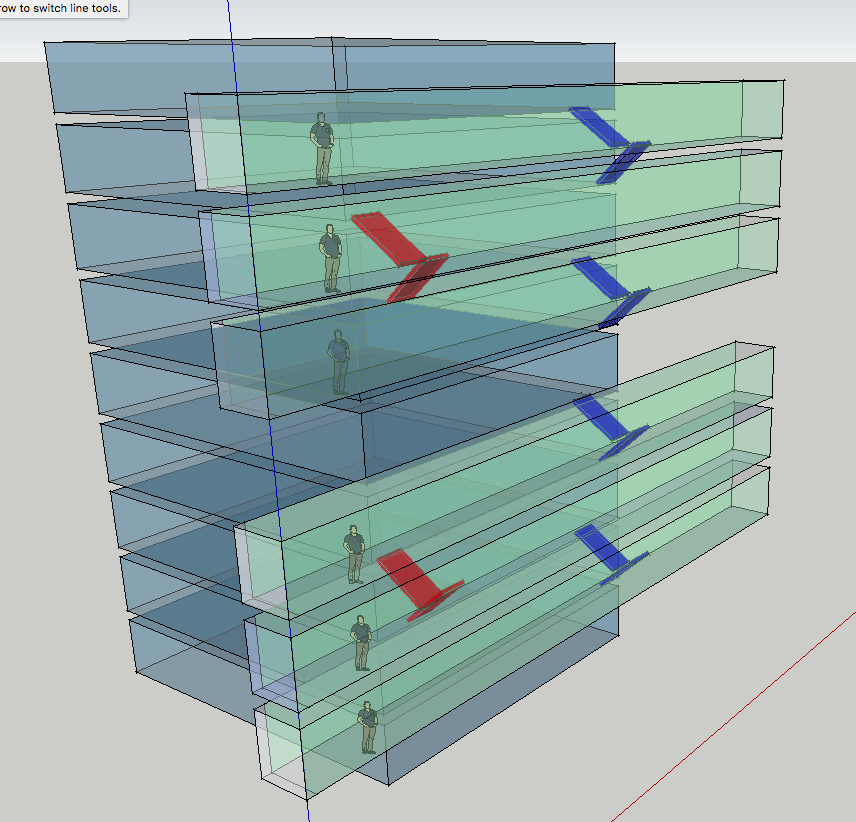
Tenant (blue) & service (red) stairs from apartments to corridors.

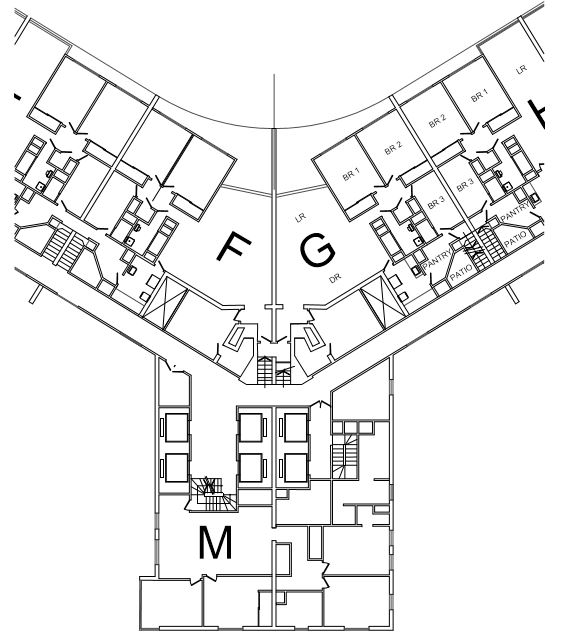
Tower Apartments.

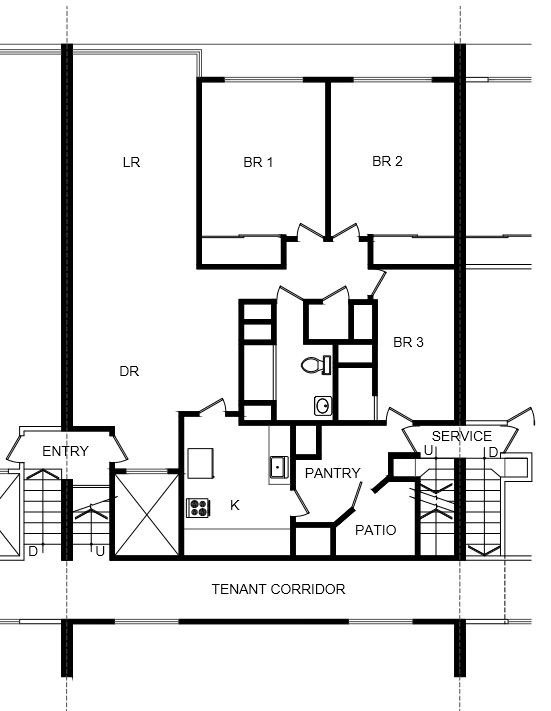
Typical apartment showing tenant stairs. (Note: a stair is located near the front door leading to the tenant corridor, a second set of stairs is located at the rear exit of the apartment and leading to the service corridor at a different level.)

== See also ==
- Martín Domínguez Esteban
- Edificio del Seguro Médico, Havana
- López Serrano Building
- Radiocentro CMQ Building
