= Television in Bulgaria =

Television in Bulgaria was introduced in 1959. Global players such as News Corporation, Modern Times Group, Central European Media Enterprises, Fox Broadcasting Company and others operate the biggest and most popular media outlets in the country.

== Terrestrial ==
In 1954, a team at the Machine and Electrotechnics Institute in Sofia (today called the Technical University of Sofia) started experimental television broadcasting with two antennas (one for sound and one for image) on the roof of a building near the Vasil Levski monument in the city, after having previously conducted successful cable test transmissions. These experimental broadcasts aroused the interest of the Ministry of Communications, which decided to build a broadcasting tower in Sofia, with a state-controlled channel to air from it. The new channel started with an unofficial broadcast on 1 November 1959, and made its first official broadcast several days later with the live coverage of the 7 November manifestation, commemorating the Russian Revolution of 1917. The experimental channel of the MEI did not air anything but a test chart on that day, although it did show a greeting to the new Sofia Television Station three times after 19:05. The MEI channel continued to operate until late 1960, when the team started working on the future introduction of color television.

The new channel, later referred to as "Bulgarian Television" (BT) used the OIRT standard of 625 lines and 25 frames per second. It also used the D/K audio system, which was generally done to prevent reception of Western European stations in Eastern Bloc countries. Public attention was quickly caught by the new medium, and the number of bought and registered television sets increased gradually. In 1960, a powerful 20 kilowatt transmitter was installed at Botev Peak, covering a large area of the country. BNT, from 1964, began broadcasting news, programmes and movies in monochrome to serve the rising number of viewers in Bulgaria. Later, more transmitters and retranslators were placed in various cities, towns and villages around the country.

Programming was controlled and influenced by the Bulgarian Communist Party-run government in this time, as was usual in the Eastern Bloc. The first popular program were the news, which were titled "Around the World and at Home" ("По света и у нас", with "at home" meaning in this case "in our country"), a name which is used to this day. The news' trademark "spinning globe" opening, first animated in 1961, is also still used (albeit highly modified). Other popular shows started around this time were the children's block "Good Night, Children" ("Лека нощ, деца", still in use), television theatre programs, the various sport events which were broadcast live from around the world, and music programs like the regular New Year celebration shows. Foreign programming in the early years was limited to mostly Soviet Union productions, as well as some direct rebroadcasts of Soviet television programming.

In 1972, the first color broadcast was made, again of a manifestation. The SECAM color system was used, because PAL was used in most western countries (except for France, where SECAM was invented). After several years, the entire programming was broadcast in color.

In 1974, the second channel of the Bulgarian Television was launched, with the original channel being called simply "first channel". Later, they were given on-screen logos and were named "BT1" ("БТ 1") and "BT2" ("БТ 2"). In the late 1980s, some western programming was allowed, including Pink Panther cartoons and the television series La piovra (Октопод) and Escrava Isaura (Робинята Изаура). Ivan Garelov's Panorama and Kevork Kevorkyan's Vsyaka nedelya talk shows/news magazines were among BT's most popular programs. With the fall of the communist rule in 1989, the two channels changed dramatically. They started airing a lot of US films and TV series, one of the first being The Flintstones (Семейство Флинтстоун). Their names were also changed, BT 1 became Kanal 1 (Channel1) (Канал 1) and BT 2 became Efir 2. The television organisation's name was changed to Bulgarian National Television. In the 1990s, BNT changed the color television system to PAL, while keeping compatibility with older TV sets by using the DK audio standard (on such sets, only black-and-white picture is seen). Efir 2's frequencies were sold in 2000 to News Corporation for the country's first over-the-air national channel: bTV. In 2008, Channel 1 was again renamed to BNT 1. The second programme started again in 2011 under the name BNT 2. It merged the regional BNT programmes.

Privately owned television channels started to appear immediately after the regime change. Most were associated with a cable television (CATV) network run by the same parent company. Around 1994–1995 private over-the-air broadcasters also appeared, but they usually only operated within a single area. Nova Television and 7 Dni TV (7 дни, meaning 7 days) were two of the first such channels, available only in Sofia. After bTV took over Efir 2's frequencies, another competition selected Nova Television, already popular in cable networks around the country, as the second privately owned national channel in Bulgaria. The authorities currently refuse to license further analogue terrestrial channels (including local ones), until DVB-T broadcasting is started.

=== Digital terrestrial television in Bulgaria ===
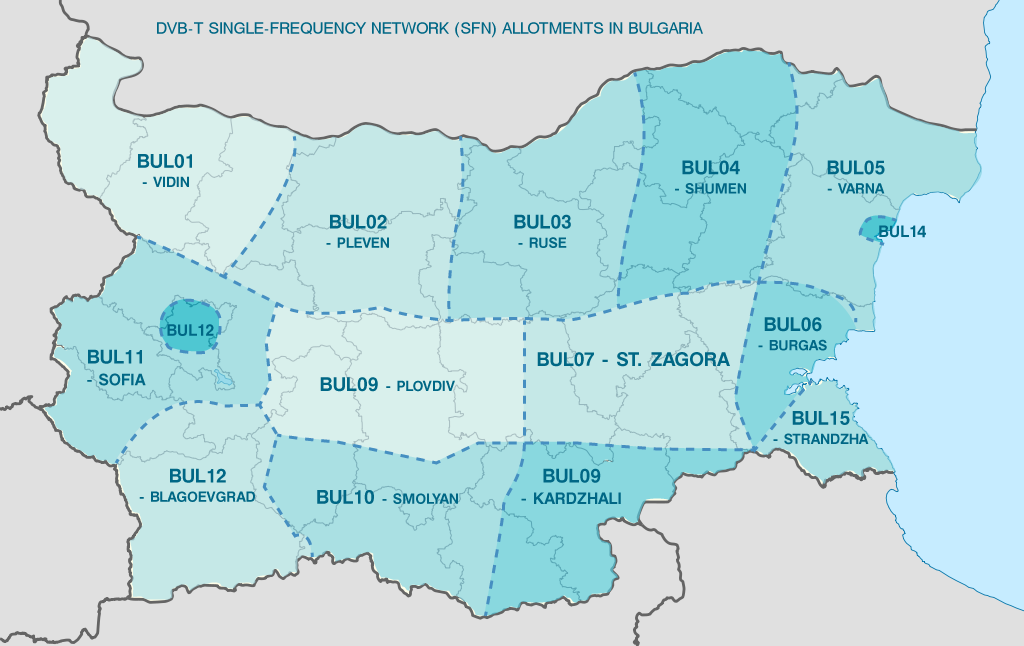
DVB-T single-frequency network (SFN) Allotments in Bulgaria

The Bulgarian Telecommunications Company provided one experimental DVB-T transponder in Sofia since 2004. First regular digital broadcast started on 1 March 2013, with a plan to terminate analog broadcasting on 1 September 2013. The Simulcast period (time between digital broadcast switch-on and analog broadcast switch-off) allowed people time to buy new integrated Digital TVs or set-top boxes. Standards chosen are DVB-T and MPEG4 AVC/H.264 compression format, while DVB-T2 would not be used for now. On 30 September 2013, the analog broadcasting was officially terminated, leaving the country with 96,2% of the population DVB-T broadcasting coverage.

== Cable ==
Cable television (CATV) in Bulgaria appeared in the early 1990s, with some of the earliest networks starting operation in 1991 and 1992. Satellite channels from other countries were one of the main features of cable television at the time and in the following years channels like Cartoon Network Europe, MTV European and Discovery Channel became very popular, as more people subscribed to the (relatively cheap) cable TV operators. Many (if not all) cable companies created their own television channels, which were available only to their subscribers. Due to technical limitations, it was initially difficult for such channels to be distributed to other populated places in the country, but in the late 90s several channels started to appear in the entire country using Bulgarian Telecommunications Company cables as the distribution method. In 1998, M SAT (then known as Mustang Sat) became the first Bulgarian channel available via satellite. The local terrestrial channel Nova Television from Sofia became available all over the country in 1999 using cable transmission. Around 2000–2001, some foreign broadcasters such as Discovery Channel and the Hallmark Channel (now DIVA Universal) started Bulgarian translations of their channels using DVB subtitles. Currently, most cable networks carry a large selection of local and foreign channels, both translated and untranslated. Translation of foreign networks has since expanded from subtitles to voice dubbing, with channels like AXN and Jetix (formerly Fox Kids) (now Disney Channel) having a Bulgarian audio track.

Analogue broadcasting is still used by operators, and it was the only method used before 2004–2005. Since then, many of them started lowering the number of analogue channels in order to launch DVB-C transponders. However, because the monthly fee for the digital packages is higher, some subscribers choose to continue using the analogue service, although with less channels than before. Currently, the biggest cable operators provide DVB-C channels in the major cities and towns. As of 2009, analogue channels are usually the only service available in villages.

== Satellite ==
Satellite channels from Bulgaria appeared prior to the existence of a DTH operator. The first channel to start broadcasting via satellite was MSAT (then known as Mustang Sat, after parent company Mustang) in 1998, operating from Varna. Before this, the Mustang channel was distributed through cable lines, maintained by the Bulgarian Telecommunications Company. The following year, the Bulgarian National Television launched a special channel, TV Bulgaria (now known as BNT World), dedicated to Bulgarians living abroad. Several other channels followed, including the musical channel MM.

Then, in 2003, Bulsatcom became the first Bulgarian DTH operator, offering initially a limited amount of channels on Hellas Sat 2. The next year, ITV Partner (now Satellite BG) was launched as a DTH service by Interactive Technologies PLC, broadcasting on Eutelsat W2. Both supply DVB-S satellite television in Bulgaria and most European countries, with some of the TV channels using the two DTH operators as their main distribution medium (so that the channels are easily available to cable operators without the use of long-distance wires). The second half of 2010 saw the long anticipated launch of the third Bulgarian DTH provider, operated by Bulgaria's Vivacom. There is also a small package operated by Telenor on Thor 3, which has for a long time distributed certain Bulgarian TV and radio channels.

Generally, Bulgarian television companies do not require a high fee for their channels' availability to viewers (some have no fee at all), but because of licensing restrictions of foreign programming, most satellite channels are encrypted, so that distribution outside Bulgaria can be limited. Free-to-view channels carry less (or none at all) such programming, airing for example music or locally produced programs only. Currently, most channels that broadcast nationally are available via satellite.

== List of television channels ==
List of television channels in Bulgaria
Name	Logo	Type	Launched	Former names	Sister channels	Website	Owner	Headquarters	Picture format	Audio lang.	Online	Terrestrial	Satellite	Cable	IPTV
BNT 1		news	26.12.1959	BT (1959–1975); BT1 (1975–1992); Kanal 1 (1992–2008)	BNT 4 BNT 2 BNT 3	www.bnt.bg	Bulgarian National Television	Sofia	16:9 SD/HD	BG	✓ http://tv.bnt.bg/bnt1 (Bulgaria only)	MUX3; MUX BUL12-1	BulgariaSat-1 @ 1.9°E; Hellas Sat 3/4 @ 39°E; Intelsat 38 @ 45.1°E	✓	✓
BNT 2		news and culture	09.09.1975 (original channel) 16.10.2011	BТ2 (1975–1992); Efir 2 (1992–2000); BNT Sever; BNT Pirin; BNT Plovdiv; BNT More; BNT Sofia	BNT 4 BNT 1 BNT 3	www.bnt.bg/bnt2	Bulgarian National Television	Sofia, Varna, Plovdiv, Rousse, Blagoevgrad	16:9 SD/HD	BG	✓ http://tv.bnt.bg/bnt2 (Bulgaria only)	MUX3	BulgariaSat-1 @ 1.9°E; Hellas Sat 3/4 @ 39°E; Intelsat 38 @ 45.1°E	✓	✓
BNT 3		sport	06.02.2014	BNT HD (2014–2018)	BNT 1 BNT 2 BNT 4	www.bnt.bg/bnt3	Bulgarian National Television	Sofia	16:9 SD/HD	BG; ЕN	✓ http://tv.bnt.bg/bnt3/ (Bulgaria only)	✗	BulgariaSat-1 @ 1.9°E; Hellas Sat 3/4 @ 39°E; Intelsat 38 @ 45.1°E	✓	✓
BNT 4		world news	02.05.1999	TV Bulgaria (1999–2008); BNT Sat (2008–2010); BNT World (2010–2018)	BNT 1 BNT 2 BNT 3	www.bnt.bg/bnt4	Bulgarian National Television	Sofia	16:9 SD/HD	BG; ЕN	✓ http://tv.bnt.bg/bnt4/	✗	BulgariaSat-1 @ 1.9°E; Hellas Sat 3/4 @ 39°E; Intelsat 38 @ 45.1°E	✓	✓
bTV		news	01.06.2000		bTV Comedy bTV Cinema bTV Action bTV Story; RING	www.btv.bg	CME (Central European Media Enterprises)	Sofia	16:9 SD/HD	BG	✓ https://btvplus.bg/live/ (Bulgaria only)	MUX2	BulgariaSat-1 @ 1.9°E; Hellas Sat 3/4 @ 39°E; Intelsat 38 @ 45.1°E	✓	✓
bTV Action		news	22.01.2011	TOP TV (1998–2006); CTN (2006–2007); TV2 (2007–2009); PRO.BG (2009–2011)	bTV bTV Cinema bTV Comedy bTV Story; RING	www.btv.bg/action	CME (Central European Media Enterprises)	Sofia	16:9 SD/HD	BG	✓ voyo.bg	✗	BulgariaSat-1 @ 1.9°E; Hellas Sat 3/4 @ 39°E; Intelsat 38 @ 45.1°E	✓	✓
bTV Comedy		movie comedy	01.06.1997	TV Triada (1997–2005); GTV (2005–2009)	bTV bTV Cinema bTV Action bTV Story; RING	www.btv.bg/comedy	CME (Central European Media Enterprises)	Sofia	16:9 SD	BG	✓ voyo.bg	✗	BulgariaSat-1 @ 1.9°E; Hellas Sat 3/4 @ 39°E; Intelsat 38 @ 45.1°E	✓	✓
bTV Cinema		movie	07.12.2009		bTV bTV Action bTV Comedy bTV Story; RING	www.btv.bg/cinema	CME (Central European Media Enterprises)	Sofia	16:9 SD	BG	✓ voyo.bg	✗	BulgariaSat-1 @ 1.9°E; Hellas Sat 3/4 @ 39°E; Intelsat 38 @ 45.1°E	✓	✓
bTV Story		movie	28.01.2012	bTV Lady (2012–2023)	bTV bTV Action bTV Comedy bTV Cinema; RING	www.btv.bg/story	CME (Central European Media Enterprises)	Sofia	16:9 SD	BG	✓ voyo.bg	✗	BulgariaSat-1 @ 1.9°E; Hellas Sat 3/4 @ 39°E; Intelsat 38 @ 45.1°E	✓	✓
RING		sport	12.05.1998	RTV; Ring + Ring TV; RING.BG	bTV bTV Action bTV Comedy bTV Cinema bTV Story	www.ring.bg	CME (Central European Media Enterprises)	Sofia	16:9 SD/HD	BG	✓ voyo.bg	✗	BulgariaSat-1 @ 1.9°E; Hellas Sat 3/4 @ 39°E; Intelsat 38 @ 45.1°E	✓	✓
Nova TV		news	16.07.1994		Diema; Kino Nova; Diema Family; Nova News; Nova Sport; Diema Sport; Diema Sport 2 Diema Sport 3	nova.bg	United Group	Sofia	16:9 SD	BG	✓ http://live.novatv.bg	MUX2	BulgariaSat-1 @ 1.9°E; Hellas Sat 3/4 @ 39°E; Intelsat 38 @ 45.1°E	✓	✓
Nova News		news	04.01.2021	Sofia Cable; Kanal 3	Diema; Kino Nova; Diema Family; Nova TV; Nova Sport; Diema Sport; Diema Sport 2 Diema Sport 3	www.nova.bg/news	United Group	Sofia	16:9 SD/HD	BG	✓ http://www.nova.bg/news/live	MUX2	BulgariaSat-1 @ 1.9°E; Hellas Sat 3/4 @ 39°E; Intelsat 38 @ 45.1°E	✓	✓
Diema		movie	15.05.1999	Diema+ (1999–2007)	Kino Nova; Diema Family; Nova News; Nova Sport; Nova Television; Diema Sport; Diema Sport 2 Diema Sport 3	www.diema.bg	United Group	Sofia	16:9 SD	BG	✗	✗	BulgariaSat-1 @ 1.9°E; Hellas Sat 3/4 @ 39°E; Intelsat 38 @ 45.1°E	✓	✓
Diema Family		movie	01.08.1999	Alexandra TV (1999–2006)	Diema; Kino Nova; Nova News; Nova Sport; Nova Television; Diema Sport Diema Sport; Diema Sport 2 Diema Sport 3	diemafamily.novatv.bg	United Group	Sofia	16:9 SD	BG	✗	✗	BulgariaSat-1 @ 1.9°E; Hellas Sat 3/4 @ 39°E; Intelsat 38 @ 45.1°E	✓	✓
Kino Nova		movie	11.08.2003	Diema 2 (2003–2011)	Diema; Diema Family; Nova News; Nova Sport; Nova Television; Diema Sport; Diema Sport 2 Diema Sport 3	www.kinonova.bg	United Group	Sofia	16:9 SD	BG	✗	✗	BulgariaSat-1 @ 1.9°E; Hellas Sat 3/4 @ 39°E; Intelsat 38 @ 45.1°E	✓	✓
Nova Sport		sport	30.04.2010	ММ (1997–2010)	Diema; Kino Nova; Diema Family; Nova News; Nova Television; Diema Sport; Diema Sport 2 Diema Sport 3	sport.novatv.bg	United Group	Sofia	16:9 SD/HD	BG	✗	✗	BulgariaSat-1 @ 1.9°E; Hellas Sat 3/4 @ 39°E; Intelsat 38 @ 45.1°E	✓	✓
Diema Sport		sport	21.02.2015	Diema Extra (2005–2007)	Diema; Kino Nova; Diema Family; Diema Sport 2 Diema Sport 3 Nova Television; Nova News; Nova Sport	www.diemasport.bg	United Group	Sofia	16:9 SD/HD	BG	✗	✗	BulgariaSat-1 @ 1.9°E; Hellas Sat 3/4 @ 39°E; Intelsat 38 @ 45.1°E	✓	✓
Diema Sport 2		sport	08.08.2015	Diema Extra (2005–2007)	Diema; Kino Nova; Diema Family; Diema Sport; Diema Sport 3 Nova Television; Nova News; Nova Sport	www.diemasport.bg	United Group	Sofia	16:9 SD/HD	BG	✓ http://play.diemaxtra.bg	✗	BulgariaSat-1 @ 1.9°E; Hellas Sat 3/4 @ 39°E; Intelsat 38 @ 45.1°E	✓	✓
Diema Sport 3		sport	01.07.2021	Diema Extra (2005–2007)	Diema; Kino Nova; Diema Family; Diema Sport; Diema Sport 2 Nova Television; Nova News; Nova Sport	www.diemasport.bg	United Group	Sofia	16:9 SD/HD	BG	✓ http://play.diemaxtra.bg	✗	BulgariaSat-1 @ 1.9°E; Hellas Sat 3/4 @ 39°E; Intelsat 38 @ 45.1°E	✓	✓

Accessibility
	— free-to-air TV channels		— encrypted TV channels		— encrypted package channels
Picture format
	— 4:3 SD		— 4:3/16:9 SD		— 16:9 SD		— 16:9 HD
Channel types
poly	— general, polythematic	info	— news, info	docu	— documentary, science	kids	— kids, cartoons
comedy	— series, entertainment	film	— films	sport	— sport	music	— music
hoby	— ecology, kitchen, hoby, reality	unconv	— politics, religion and unconventional

=== Terrestrial (free-to-air channels with national coverage) ===
- BNT 1, state-owned TV network
- BNT 2; state-owned TV network
- BNT 3, state-owned TV network
- Nova Television, TV network, used former analogue frequency of ORT
- bTV; TV network, used former analogue frequencies of BNT's defunct second channel Efir 2
- Bulgaria ON AIR, part of the Investor.BG group of channels

=== Pay television ===
- Bloomberg TV Bulgaria
- TV+
- Balkanika TV
- City TV
- Fan TV
- HD+
- Planeta TV
- Planeta Folk
- SKAT
- The Voice
- Euronews Bulgaria (Formerly TV Europa)
- 7/8 TV

==== Foreign channels translated into Bulgarian ====
Channels marked with an asterisk (*) have a Bulgarian audio channel, all others have Bulgarian subtitles only Channels marked with an plus (+) are broadcasting in HD

- Animal Planet+
- Star Crime (ex FOX Crime)*+
- Star Life (ex FOX Life)*+
- Star Channel (ex FOX)*+
- Star Movies (ex FOX Movies)*+
- AXN*
- AXN Black*
- AXN White*
- Cinemax*+
- Cinemax 2*+
- Discovery Channel*+
- Discovery Science+
- Investigation Discovery*+
- TLC*
- Eurosport*+
- Eurosport 2*+
- HBO*+
- HBO 2*+
- HBO 3 (ex HBO Comedy)*+
- National Geographic Channel*+
- National Geographic Wild*+
- Travel Channel (UK)*+
- TV1000+
- Viasat Nature+ (as Viasat History/Nature HD)
- Viasat History+ (as Viasat History/Nature HD)
- Viasat Explorer*
- Fine Living Network
- Comedy Central Extra
- CBS Reality
- Disney Channel*+ (its broadcasting in HD only as on demand)
- Cartoon Network*+ (its broadcasting in HD only as on demand)
- Cartoonito*+ (its broadcasting in HD only as on demand)
- Nickelodeon*+ (its broadcasting in HD only as on demand)
- Nicktoons*+ (its broadcasting in HD only as on demand)
- Nick Jr.*+ (its broadcasting in HD only as on demand)

== Most viewed channels ==
Source: Nielsen Admosphere Bulgaria, December 2022

Position	Channel	Share of total viewing (%)
1	bTV	22.96
2	Nova TV	17.31
3	BNT 1	7.76
4	Diema Family	3.87
5	Diema	3.33
6	Kino Nova	2.62
7	bTV Cinema	2.07
8	FOX Crime	1.97
9	Nova News	1.66
10	bTV Action	1.49
11	bTV Comedy	1.39
12	bTV Story	1.21
13	FOX	0.90
14	National Geographic	0.82
15	BNT 3	0.75
16	Diema Sport 3	0.70
17	Nick Jr. Channel	0.67
18	Nickelodeon	0.66
19	Discovery Channel	0.65
20	Eurocom	0.65

== See also ==
- List of Bulgarian television shows
