= Alexandra Audio =

Bulgarian dubbing studio

Alexandra Audio Александра Аудио
- Alexandra Audio's logo
- Industry: Dubbing and subtitling
- Founded: 1999
- Website: Alexandra Audio

Alexandra Audio (Bulgarian: Александра Аудио) is a Bulgarian dubbing studio. The company is based in the country's capital Sofia. It was founded in 1999.

It commissions voice-overed and dubbed versions of material for its clients. AXN commissions Alexandra Audio to make voice over versions of some material shown on it.

== Clients ==
- Bulgarian National Television
- bTV (Bulgaria)
- Nova Television (Bulgaria)
- Cartoon Network
- Disney Channel Bulgaria
- Disney Character Voices International
- AXN
- Bulsatcom
- FOX Life
- FOX Crime
- Nickelodeon (Bulgaria)

== Television shows ==
- Kim Possible
- The Scooby-Doo Show
- Foster's Home for Imaginary Friends
- Bob the Builder
- Thomas & Friends
- Ben 10
- Ben 10: Alien Force
- Eliot Kid
- Drake & Josh
- The Marvelous Misadventures of Flapjack
- The Buzz on Maggie
- Chop Socky Chooks
- Chowder
- Batman: The Brave and the Bold (season 2)
- Angelo Rules
- Looney Tunes Show
- Ben 10: Ultimate Alien
- Hannah Montana
- Teletubbies
- Sonny with a Chance
- Pet Alien
- Sitting Ducks
- Kick Buttowski
- The Suite Life on Deck
- The Fairly OddParents
- Have a Laugh!
- Jake & Blake
- Mickey Mouse Clubhouse
- My Friends Tigger & Pooh
- Every Witch Way
- Henry Danger
- Harvey Beaks
- The ZhuZhus

== Movies ==
- Mars Needs Moms
- Yogi Bear
- Shrek
- Shrek 2
- Shrek the Third
- Shrek Forever After
- Rango
- Ratatouille
- Megamind
- How to Train Your Dragon
- Ice Age
- Ice Age: The Meltdown
- The Emperor's New Groove
- Ice Age: Dawn of the Dinosaurs
- Ice Age: Continental Drift
- Barbie (as Ars Digital Studio and Doli Media Studio)
- The Princess and the Frog
- Winnie the Pooh
- Pinocchio
- The Road to El Dorado (on VHS and DVD)
- Joseph: King of Dreams (on VHS and DVD)
- The Iron Giant (on VHS and DVD)
- Balto (on VHS and DVD)
- Lemonade Mouth
- Recess: School's Out
- Kung Fu Panda
- Kung Fu Panda 2
- Mulan
- Harry Potter and the Philosopher's Stone
- Atlantis: The Lost Empire
- Monsters vs. Aliens
- Monsters, Inc.
- Open Season
- The Smurfs
- The Muppets
- Surf's Up
- Cats & Dogs: The Revenge of Kitty Galore
- Beauty and the Beast
- Tangled
- 102 Dalmatians (on VHS and DVD)
- 101 Dalmatians (on VHS and DVD)
- Tarzan
- Tarzan 2
- Toy Story 2
- Toy Story 3
- The Lion King
- Skyrunners
- The Cat in the Hat
- Sinbad: Legend of the Seven Seas
- Dinosaur
- The Lion Guard: Return of the Roar

== See also ==
- Doli Media Studio fellow dubbing based in Sofia
