= Leka nosht, deca =

Bulgarian children's television programme

Leka nosht, deca (Bulgarian: Лека нощ, деца, literally "Good Night, Children"), also known as Suncho (Сънчо, "Sandman"), after its opening theme, is a Bulgarian children's bedtime programming strand airing on Bulgarian National Television since 1960. The strand aired on BNT 1 from 1960 to 2019; since then, it has aired on BNT 2. The strand is broadcast at 7:45pm or 7:50pm, which, when it aired on BNT 1, aired before the main edition of Po sveta i u nas.

== History and content ==
Leka nosht, deca was first broadcast on 5 March 1960 and its content was an animated short, preceded and followed by the show's theme. At the time of its creation, it was believed that television would be harmful to children, and in its early years, it was often the only children's program on Bulgarian television. The opening and closing themes of the strand had their lyrics written by Dimitar Spasov and its music composed by Petar Stupel. The lyrics were sung by Lina Boyadzhieva, who died in 2015 at the age of 86. BNT's children's department was operating at a shoestring, with lack of money and photo studios, lack of editing time and sound recording. Leka nosht, deca often featured Bulgarian creations during the communist phase, such as Nie, vrabchetata by Yordan Radchikov; Anini prikazki by Stefan Tsanev; Cvetni prikazki by Leda Mileva; Prez vodi i gori by Emiliyan Stanev; and others.

After the fall of communism, in 1992, the strand presented its first crisis. That year, BNT closed its children's department, then in 2003, Kiril Gotsev removed the strand from the schedule. When Gotsev resigned from BNT's presidency the following year, the strand was revived. BNT started replacing Bulgarian series with foreign productions.

In 2019, during the sixtieth anniversary of BNT, BNT 1 removed Leka nosht, deca from its programming. From 9 September 2019, BNT 2 started airing the strand featuring the Russian series Masha and the Bear. Its removal from BNT 1 caused massive concern among parents and critics, the majority of which was unaware that it had moved channels.

While the strand continues on BNT 2, a revival of sorts appeared on BNT 1 from 14 September 2024: Raskazhi mi prikazka (Разкажи ми приказка, Tell Me a Story), limited to Bulgarian actors and artists telling stories from national folklore.

== Popularity in Romania ==
In the 1980s, TVR, Romania's state TV company, faced a series of crises even in the harshest years of the Ceaucescu regime, with no proper strand aimed at children. Until 1989, with the fall of his regime, BNT's first channel was well-received via overspill in southern Romania and one of its attractive programs was Leka nosht, deca. The strand was praised at the time for offering a wider selection of cartoons than TVR's Gala desenului animat, which aired five cartoons a week.
