= Nova News =

Bulgarian television channel

- Country: Bulgaria
- Broadcast area: Bulgaria
- Headquarters: Sofia, Bulgaria

Programming
- Language: Bulgarian
- Picture format: 1080i HDTV (downscaled to 16:9 576i for the SDTV feed

Ownership
- Owner: United Group
- Parent: Nova Broadcasting Group
- Sister channels: Nova; Kino Nova; Nova Sport; Diema; Diema Family; Diema Sport; Diema Sport 2; Diema Sport 3; The Voice; Magic TV

History
- Launched: 4 January 2021

Links
- Website: http://www.nova.bg/

Nova News is a Bulgarian news channel owned by Nova Broadcasting Group.

== History ==
The launch of the channel was announced on 3 December 2020, when Nova Broadcasting Group announced that from 4 January 2021 Channel 3 will be named with the actual name retaining the team of the defunct channel.

The hosts of the news are Desislava Peycheva, Yulia Manolova, Yana Moiseeva and Daniela Pehlivanova.
