= The Voice (radio station) =

European radio station

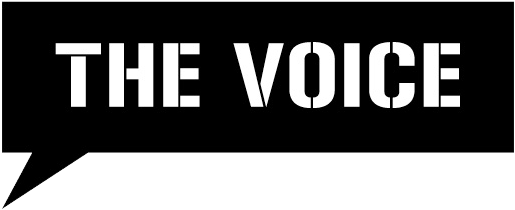

Ownership
- Owner: Bauer Media Group (Denmark); United Group (Bulgaria)

History
- Founded: June 1984 (In Denmark) by Otto Reedtz-Thott and Klaus Riskær Pedersen

Coverage
- Availability: Denmark; Bulgaria

The Voice is a European radio station operating in Denmark and Bulgaria. It was available until 2012 in Finland and in Sweden until broadcasts stopped online early 2020. The Nordic radio stations were owned by Bauer Media Group, and the Bulgarian station was owned by A.E. Best Success Services Bulgaria EOOD until 2022 since then it is owned by Nova Radio Group. The format consists mostly of new Pop songs, real life events and concerts like the local Coca-Cola The Voice Happy Energy Tour. The target audience of the listeners is 15 to 25 years old. Income is generated by commercials. The station was founded in Denmark as a local radio in the Copenhagen area.

== Important dates ==
- 8 June 1984 (12:00 pm) - The first The Voice station goes on air in Copenhagen, Denmark
- 1 April 2004 - The Voice goes on air in and replaces Radio City in Stockholm, Sweden
- 17 August 2004 - The Danish version of the TV-channel The Voice TV begins
- 12 November 2004 The Finnish version of TV-channel The Voice TV begins
- 17 December 2004 - The Swedish version of the TV-channel The Voice begins
- 2005 - The Voice Radio launches in Norway
- 2006 - The Voice Bulgaria launches
- 2007 - The Voice Radio launches in Finland
- 30 September 2008 - The Voice TV was closed in Sweden
- 10 November 2011 - ProSiebenSat.1 sells the Bulgarian division to A.E. Best Success Services Bulgaria EOOD.
- 1 September 2012 - The Voice TV was closed in Finland and replaced by Kutonen
- 14 December 2012 - Discovery Communications buys the SBS Nordic operations from ProSiebenSat.1 Group.
- 31 December 2012 - The Voice TV was closed in Denmark and replaced by 7'eren
- 2012 - The Voice TV was closed in Norway
- April 2015 - Discovery sells SBS Discovery Radio to Bauer Media Group.
- October 2015 - The Voice radio was closed in Norway and replaced by Kiss
- 29 April 2016 - In Sweden, The Voice radio was replaced by Kiss on FM, but remained as an online-only radio station.
- 2020 - The Voice stops broadcasting online in Sweden
- 2022 - Radio and TV The Voice Bulgaria were sold to Nova Broadcasting Group and the studio and the moderators were completely changed.

== Availability ==
=== Denmark ===
The station is available nationwide on DAB radio and online, and on FM radio on the following frequencies:

Frequency	City or area
89,1	Helsingør
90,0	Frederikssund
90,0	Egtved
91,8	Værløse
93,1	Aarhus
93,6	Køge
93,7	Aarhus
96,1	Copenhagen
98,0	Ringe
99,1	West Zealand County
100,1	Silkeborg
100,2	Aalborg
101,4	Frederikshavn
101,8	Randers
104,1	Børkop
104,3	Ikast
104,3	West Zealand County
104,5	Jelling
104,6	Nykøbing Falster
104,7	Egtved
104,9	Copenhagen
105,0	Hornsherred
105,1	Funen
105,4	Copenhagen
105,9	Vejle
106,2	Thisted
106,6	Roskilde
106,9	Horsens
107,3	Hillerød
107,5	South Zealand
107,6	Funen
107,9	Tørring

=== Bulgaria ===
Sofia - 96.2

Smolyan - 88.2

Nessebar - 98.7

Karnobat - 93.3

Plovdiv- 106

Kurdzhali - 107.5
