= Modern Times Group =

Digital entertainment company

Modern Times Group MTG AB
- Type: Publicly traded Aktiebolag
- Traded as: Nasdaq Stockholm: MTG A MTG B
- Industry: Media
- Founded: 1987; 39 years ago
- Headquarters: Stockholm, Sweden
- Key people: David Chance (Chairman); Maria Redin (President and CEO); Lars Torstensson (CFO)
- Products: Television, eSports, online games and digital networks
- Revenue: ▼SEK 3.997 Billion (Fiscal Year Ended 31 December 2020)
- Operating income: ▲SEK 0.035 Billion (Fiscal Year Ended 31 December 2020)
- Net income: ▲SEK -0.096 Billion (Fiscal Year Ended 31 December 2020)
- Total assets: ▲SEK 10.800 Billion (Fiscal Year Ended 31 December 2020)
- Total equity: ▼SEK 5.216 Billion (Fiscal Year Ended 31 December 2020)
- Subsidiaries: InnoGames; Dreamhack; Ninja Kiwi
- Website: www.mtg.com

Modern Times Group (MTG) is a digital entertainment company based in Stockholm, Sweden. It formed from the media holdings of investment company Kinnevik, which in 1997 was distributed to the company stockholders. It is a strategic and operational investment holding company, managing a portfolio including gaming companies InnoGames and Ninja Kiwi, and digital network company Zoomin.TV.

Kinnevik distributed the MTG shares to its shareholders in 2018 and in 2019 MTG distributed shares in the newly founded Nordic Entertainment Group (now Viaplay Group) to its shareholders following the strategic transformation into a global digital entertainment company.

== Structure ==
Since July 2015, MTG's digital presence was expanded through a number of acquisitions. In 2015 MTG bought 74% of the shares in Turtle Entertainment, a top-tier esports tournament operator, owning brands such as Electronic Sports League (ESL). MTG then acquired 51% of the shares in Zoomin.TV, Europe's largest MCN and the 5th largest network on YouTube. Later the same year MTG made the acquisition of 100% of DreamHack, one of the biggest esports tournament organisers in the world. In 2016 and 2017 MTG continued its journey by acquiring 35% of a leading German games developing company InnoGames and U.S. based games publishing company Kongregate. Since the start of its investment operations, MTG has made further share acquisitions in the before-mentioned companies.

== Timeline ==
Below is a timeline of MTG milestones since 1987.

=== 1980s ===
- In 1987, TV3 launches in Sweden on New Year's Eve becoming the first commercial channel in Scandinavia. In 1988 the channel started broadcasting to Norway and Denmark. The number of viewers increases from 1.2 million at launch to 3.4 million at the end of 1988.
- In 1988, Strix launches independent TV production.
- In 1989, pay channel TV1000 launches.
- In 1989 TV Shop starts selling products and services on TV3 .

=== 1990 ===
- TV3 achieves 45% penetration in Sweden and commands 90% of the TV advertising market.
- Acquisition of majority shareholding in Svensk Text (SDI Media).
- September: TV3 Denmark launches, replacing the Pan-Scandinavian version.

=== 1991 ===
- TV3 reports an annual profit.
- TV3 Norway launches, each Scandinavian country now has its own version of TV3.
- TV4 granted license as Sweden's third terrestrial TV station. Kinnevik acquires 30% shareholding in TV4.
- Launch of Viasat DTH satellite pay-TV platform.
- TV1000 merges with competitor SF Succé.

=== 1992 ===
- ZTV's first year as an independent channel.
- Kinnevik's media companies report an annual profit.

=== 1993 ===
- September: P4 Radio Hele Norge a national commercial radio network in Norway is launched. MTG is one of its founders.
- First commercial radio licenses obtained in Sweden. TV3 commences Teletext broadcasting.
- Terrestrial TV channels launched in Estonia and Lithuania.

=== 1994 ===
- TV4 becomes largest channel in Sweden.
- TV6 launched.

=== 1995 ===
- MTG incorporated as Kinnevik subsidiary.
- Metro launched in Stockholm.
- Minority holding acquired in Finanstidningen daily business newspaper.

=== 1996 ===
- Satellite TV distribution platform switched from Astra to NSAB.
- January: Radio Rix radio network formed through a merger between MTG's P6 and SRU.
- April: ZTV and TV6 merged to form 3+ in Denmark.

=== 1997 ===
- Launch of Viasat+, an analogue low-pay satellite package broadcast from the NSAB satellite consisting of MTG's own television channels as well as Nickelodeon, VH1 and Sci-Fi Channel.
- Shares in MTG distributed to Kinnevik shareholders and listed on Stockholm Börsinformation and Nasdaq National Market in New York. Second Metro edition published in Prague.
- Strix becomes the first company in the world to produce the Survivor reality TV format.

=== 1998 ===
- February: Metro launches in Gothenburg.
- March: TV6 in Sweden relaunches as a Pan-Nordic pay channel called "TV6 Nature World" and "TV6 Action World".
- ZTV moves from Stockholm to London and expands its schedule considerably.
- MTG acquires the Latvian television channel Channel 31 (Latvian: 31. kanāls), which is later transformed into TV3 Latvia.
- Viasat's satellite TV subscribers exceed 1 million.
- Commercial radio operations launched in Estonia and Latvia.
- September: Metro launches in Budapest.

=== 1999 ===
- Metro launched in Malmö, Helsinki and the Netherlands.
- Monthly magazine Kapital launched in Sweden.
- Internet portal Everyday.com introduced.
- Swedish business channel TV8 acquired.
- MTG's shares quoted on Stockholmsbörsen O-list.
- February: Launch of CDON.COM.
- March: Launch of sports channel Viasat Sport.
- June: Darial-TV started broadcasting as DTV-Viasat.

=== 2000 ===
- March: Launch of television channel Viasat Plus in Norway.
- Annual General Meeting approves distribution of Metro International S.A. share capital to MTG shareholders.
- Hans-Holger Albrecht appointed president and CEO of MTG.
- MTG buys the Hungarian television channel Alfa TV which becomes Viasat3.
- PIN24 launches on Sky TV's platform in the UK.
- MTG buys the rest of TV1000 from its parent company.
- Viasat launched its digital satellite platform.

=== 2001 ===
- May: Viasat becomes first European satellite TV broadcaster to switch off analog transmission of premium pay-TV channels following a successful transition to digital TV.
- TV3 awarded national terrestrial broadcasting license in Latvia.
- Digital home-shopping channel PIN24 launched in Denmark.
- MTG acquires 75% of Russian national commercial TV channel.
- Options to Strix reality TV formats sold in over 30 countries to date.
- Viasat launches four new digital pay-TV channels in the Nordic region.
- EUR 120 million convertible subordinated bonds issued to fund further expansion.
- Number of Viasat digital DTH subscribers increases to over 550,000 by year-end.

=== 2002 ===
- January: Viasat Sport Denmark and Viasat Explorer launches.
- January: Acquisition of 37 percent of StoryFirst Communications, Inc., owner of the Russian CTC network.
- January: Acquisition of Swedish radio stations Lugna Favoriter and WOW 105.5 from RTL Group.
- New TV3 schedule recovers share of viewing in Scandinavia.
- Doubling of Eastern European TV revenues.
- Launch of PIN24 in Germany, Austria and Switzerland
- Launch of Tango TV in Lithuania.
- Increase in the number of digital DTH subscribers to 617,000 and more than doubling of pay-TV operating income.
- TV1000 and Baltic operations both report their first annual profits, and TV-Shop turned around. SEK 423 million increase in operating free cash flow.

=== 2003 ===
- TV3 Scandinavia recovers share of viewing and advertisement sales.
- Eastern European operations profitable on a combined basis.
- Pay-TV record operating income SEK 505 million.
- Viasat signs agreement with NDS VideoGuard to eliminate piracy.
- Launch of pay-TV channels TV 1000 East and Viasat Explorer in Eastern and Central Europe.

=== 2004 ===
- MTG reports highest ever operating result.
- February: Launch of Viasat Sport 2 and Viasat Sport 3
- May: Viasat History launches in Eastern Europe.
- September: Launch of TV1000 Action, TV1000 Classic, TV1000 Family and TV1000 Nordic.
- Viasat successfully completes implementation of a new conditional access system.
- Highest net subscriber intake since digitalisation of platform in 2000.
- Viasat's four channels reach 6.4 million homes in Central and Eastern Europe.
- MTG acquires remaining minority interests in DTV and increases its shareholding in CTC Media and Radio Hele Norge following the sale of SDI Media for US$60 million.
- MTG acquires 19.9% of betting company BET24.
- MTG also signs agreement with NRJ Group to assume management of 20 radio stations in Sweden (and 5 in Norway), thereby increasing penetration for MTG's national network to 83%.

=== 2005 ===
MTG sells its 15.1 percent interest in TV4 AB in January 2005. In March, CTC Media launches the Domashny television network in Russia.

In July 2005, Modern Entertainment Ltd., its film rights unit in Los Angeles, agreed to sell 332 films to Lionsgate Films and shut down its operations to focus on European operations.

- October: Launch of Russian language movie channel TV1000 Russian Kino.
- October: SportN launches in Norway.
- November: TV1000 Balkan launches.

=== 2006 ===
- March: MTG became majority shareholder of Bet24, owning 90% of the company.
- May: TV6 launches in Sweden.
- September: MTG increases its holding P4 Radio Hele Norge to 90.8 percent, becoming the sole owner in December.
- November: Viasat Sport East launches.

=== 2007 ===
- January: Viasat Golf launches in the Nordic countries.
- March: MTG buys the Balkan Media Group Limited Bulgarian channels: Diema, Diema 2, Diema Family, Diema Extra, MM and M2
- April: TV6 launches in Latvia.
- May: M2 in Bulgaria is closed down.
- September: Viasat 4 launches, replacing ZTV in Norway.
- October: CTC-media bought & rebrand DTV

=== 2008 ===
- January: Viasat launches high-definition television in the Nordic countries.
- March: TV6 launches in Estonia.
- April: TV1000 Premium launches in the Baltics.
- July: MTG buys Nova television and Nova+ from Antenna Group.
- September: Tango TV relaunches as TV6 Lithuania.
- December: Viasat 1 launches in Ghana.
- December: Nova+ in Bulgaria is closed down.

=== 2009 ===
- January: Viasat Sport Baltic launches.
- February: TV1000 Drama launches.
- March: TV3 Puls launches in Denmark.
- The Diema Media Group and MM, previously a joint-venture between MTG and Apace Media, are merged with Nova television to create the Nova Broadcasting Group.
- April: Prima Cool launches in the Czech Republic.

=== 2010 ===
- April: Nova Sport launches in Bulgaria, replacing MM.
- September: TV10 launches in Sweden.
- December: Modern African Productions was founded in Ghana.
- December: MTG launched as the first Scandinavian pay-TV operator 3D content in their Viasat offer.

=== 2011 ===
- March: Prima love launches in the Czech Republic.
- August: M.A.P. launches her first production in Ghana.
- September: Kino Nova launches in Bulgaria, replacing Diema 2.
- October: TV8 opened in Lithuania. CTC-Media launched Peretz based on DTV.
- November: CTC opened in Baltic.

=== 2012 ===
- January: MTG reaches an agreement on acquiring Latvian channels LNT, TV5 and Kanāls 2.
- February: In Slovenia closed down TV3.
- March: All TV 1000 channels in Nordic countries renamed as Viasat Film.
- April: Nova Premier League HD launches in Bulgaria.
- June: Viasat Motor launches in Baltic.
- July: Jorgen Madsen appointed president and CEO of MTG.
- October: Game-services Bet24 sold.
- November: Running HD-version channels TV6 Sweden, Viasat 4, Viasat Explorer, Viasat History, Viasat Nature, Viasat Crime.

=== 2013 ===
- January: Radio station NRJ Sweden sold to SBS Sweden (ProSiebenSat.1). In Denmark running TV3 Sport 1.
- February: Prima ZOOM opened in Czech Republic. Running TV3 Sport 2 in Denmark.
- March: Running HD-version TV3 Denmark.
- November: TV6 opened in Norway.
- June: Nova Premier League HD in Bulgaria is closed down.
- July: Nova Sport HD launches in Bulgaria.

=== 2014 ===
- February: MTG acquires 75% Trace Partners SAS (brand 'TRACE')
- December: Russian satellite TV-platform Raduga TV closed down.

=== 2015 ===
- February: MTG sold Hungarian Free-TV channels (Viasat 3, Viasat 6 and Hungarian video-portal Viasat Play) to Sony Pictures Television Networks.
- February: Diema Sport launches in Bulgaria.
- June: MTG acquires 74% of the German gaming company Turtle Entertainment.
- August: Diema Sport 2 launches in Bulgaria.
- September: MTG acquires majority stake in esports company Turtle Entertainment and its subsidiaries Electronic Sports League (ESL)
- October: MTG sold Russian & international pay-TV channels (factual, movie and sports channels in Russia. TV1000 and pan-regional factual channels in international) to Baring Vostok Company in international and LLC Sinerdzhi in Russia.
- November: MTG acquires Swedish esports tournament DreamHack
- December: MTG and minoritaries sold 75% CTC Media to ″UTH Holding″ in Russia.

=== 2016 ===
- March: MTG sold Ukrainian pay-TV company Viasat Ukraine to 1+1 Media Group. In Latvia, Russian-language channel TV5 closed down.
- May: MTG took a 22 per cent stake in Engage Sports Media (ESM). ESM described the deal as a ‘strategically important investment’ that will allow ESM to accelerate its growth and focuses on content IP development, technical tools and adding new talent across the business. Arnd Benninghoff, CEO of MTGx said “this investment reflects our focus on becoming the leading digital video entertainment company in each of our markets, and our strategy to invest in relevant, complementary and scalable digital brands, content and communities.”
- August: For the Nordic Market, Viasat launches Scandinavia's first UHD Channel to deliver select Rio 2016 OL programs (and future UHD Sports Broadcasts) as well as a new HD Sports Channel branded "Viasat Sport Premium.",
- October: MTG acquires 35% in German games developer Innogames
- December: MTG sold African business (Viasat 1 (Ghana), TV1 (Tanzania) and Modern African Production (MAP)) to Econet Media Group.

=== 2017 ===
- January: MTG sold FTV Prima Holding to Denemo Media (part of GES GROUP). In April 2017, the transaction was completed.
- March: MTG sold business in Baltic States to Providence Equity Partners. In October 2017, the transaction was completed.
- May: MTG increased its stake in German games developer InnoGames to 51% by investing EUR 82.6 million.
- June: MTG acquires Kongregate.
- October: MTG launched TV3 MAX in Denmark which replaced TV3 Sport 2.
- October: MTG sells its free-TV, pay-TV, digital and radio businesses in Estonia, Latvia and Lithuania to the asset management firm Providence Equity Partners, uniting them under the All Media Baltics company name.
- December: MTG secured the exclusive Nordic media rights to the five-a-side-football variant Futsal's biggest European tournament, UEFA Futsal Euro 2018.
- December: MTG launched a $30 million gaming investment fund.

=== 2018 ===
- January: MTG sold TRACE Media Group to TPG Growth. In May 2018, the transaction was completed.
- February: MTG business in Scandinavia (MTG Nordic Entertainment and MTG Studios) combination with TDC Group proposed. MTG sold Nova Broadcasting Group in Bulgaria to PPF Group.
- March: Board of Directors of TDC Group withdraws its recommendation of combination with MTG Nordics. Modern Times Group (MTG) will split into two companies: Nordic Entertainment Group (MTG Nordic Entertainment, MTG Studios and Splay Networks) and new MTG company (MTGx).
- May: MTG increased the share in Zoom.in Group B.V. (Zoomin.TV) from 51% to 100%.
- June: Nordic Entertainment Group companies Splay Networks and Nice One will merge to new company SplayOne.

=== 2019 ===
- March: The separation between MTG and Nordic Entertainment Group is finalized and Nordic Entertainment Group is listed as a separate company on Nasdaq Nordic Large Cap.

=== 2020s ===
- In March 2021, MTG acquired Ninja Kiwi, allowing them to expand their business into the tower defense genre.
- In July 2021, MTG acquired 100% of the shares of PlaySimple, expanding MTG's business into the casual games and word games genres.
- In January 2022, MTG sold ESL to Saudi Arabia's Public Investment Fund Savvy Gaming Group (SGG). SGG also acquired FACEIT, and will merge the two esports companies to form the ESL FaceIt Group. The acquisition is set to close in Q2 2022.
