= Neosat =

Bulgarian satellite television, internet and mobile operator

- Native name: Неосат
- Industry: Telecommunications
- Founded: 2020; 6 years ago
- Defunct: January 15, 2027; 58 days' time
- Headquarters: Sofia, Bulgaria
- Products: Satellite television
- Website: www.neosat.bg

Neosat is a Bulgarian satellite television operator. It was founded in 2020 by Maxim Zayakov, who left Bulsatcom two years earlier. The service is expected to close on 15 January 2027.

== History ==
Neosat was announced on 5 May 2020 with service beginning on 1 June and it used BulgariaSat-1, which Zayakov launched in 2017. He was joined by George Skikos, formerly of Hellas Sat and also a shareholder in BulgariaSat. Deltacom Electronics would manufacture its equipment. It was set to have 210 channels, 110 of which in high definition, spread over four packages. At the time of launching, it and a Serbian provider were using half of the transponders on the satellite.

On 12 November 2026, it announced the termination of pay-TV services effective 15 January 2027 due to market circumstances. Existing subscribers will still watch free-to-air channels available on the satellite.
