= Po sveta i u nas =

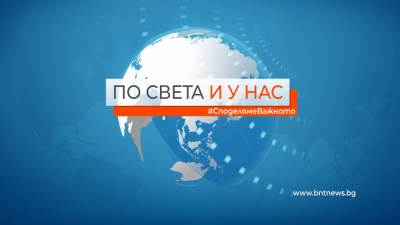
- Logo since 2020
- Genre: News programme
- Country of origin: Bulgaria
- Original language: Bulgarian

Production
- Producer: BNT
- Production location: Sofia
- Camera setup: Multi-camera
- Running time: 30 minutes

Original release
- Network: BNT1
- Release: 20 July 1960 – present

Po sveta i u nas (Bulgarian: По света и у нас, lit. 'In the world and at us') is the flagship Bulgarian news program aired each day on the Bulgarian public television channel BNT 1, the flagship channel of Bulgarian National Television (BNT).

== History ==
=== Bulgarian television ===
The broadcast of "Po sveta i u nas" was started on July 20, 1960. Before this news broadcast, since November 7, 1959, news broadcasts were broadcast daily in 5 minutes.The first speaker is Nikola Philipov. The following leaders after Philipov are Maria Yanakieva, Anahid Tacheva, Georgi Lambrev, Maria Trolva, Lili Vankova, Lyubinka Nyagolova.

=== Bulgarian National television ===
For over 20 years, the leading TV pairs of BNT news are: Radinella Busserska - Grigori Nedialkov, Radina Chervenova - Spas Kyosev and Mira Dobreva - Hristo Petko. The news of 1999 began broadcasting from the specially designed Studio 6. Po sveta i u nas is the chronicle of Bulgaria - words of Boyko Vasilev - Bulgarian journalist and television host.

== Notable anchors ==
- Nora Arsova
- Grigori Nedyalkov
- Spas Kiossev
- Radinela Buserska
- Rumen Yovchev
- Poli Zlatareva
- Daniel Mihaylov
- Tonya Dimitrova
- Georgi Lyubenov
- Marin Marinov
- Neri Terzieva
- Dimitar Tsonev
- Radina Chervenova
- Asen Agov
- Veselina Aleksandrova
- Marina Mateva
- Hristina Hristova-Lyubomirova
- Nadya Obretenova
- Yuliya Naeva
- Evgeniya Atanasova-Teneva
- Dobrina Cheshmedzhieva
- Daniel Chipev
- Kostadin Filipov
- Angel Bonchev
- Mira Dobreva
- Filipa Ognyanova
- Viktoria Boyadzhieva
