= Sport+ =

Sport+ may refer to:

- Sport+ (France), a cable and satellite television channel owned by Canal+
- Sport+ (Greece), a digital terrestrial television station owned by ERT
- Sport+, a sister channel of TV+, Bulgaria
