= F+ =

F+ may refer to:

- F+ (pitch), a musical pitch traditionally used for the Northumbrian smallpipes
- F augmented triad, a chord with the notes F, A, and C#
- F^{+} a bacterium having F-plasmid in bacterial conjugation
- In Academic grading in the United States, F+ is a rarely used grade above F
- F+, a sister channel of TV+, Bulgaria
