= It Runs in the Family =

It Runs in the Family may refer to:

- It Runs in the Family (1994 film), or My Summer Story, a sequel to the 1983 film A Christmas Story
- It Runs in the Family (2003 film), an American comedy-drama film directed by Fred Schepisi
- "It Runs in the Family" (Murder, She Wrote), a 1987 television episode
- It Runs in the Family, a 1987 play by Ray Cooney
- It Runs in the Family, a game show on Viasat 1
