= Martin Karbovski =

Bulgarian journalist, presenter and author

- Born: 3 February 1970 (age 56); Sofia, Bulgaria
- Occupations: Journalist, TV host, writer, poet
- Writing career
- Period: 1994–present
- Genres: Journalism, poetry
- Notable works: "Defloration", 1994
- Website: www.martinkarbowski.com

Martin Kirilov Bogdanov (Bulgarian: Мартин Кирилов Богданов) (born on 3 January 1970) is a Bulgarian journalist, TV presenter, writer and poet.

== Biography ==
In 1984 he began his secondary education at the German High School in Sofia – 91 ESUU "Karl Liebknecht". On the 21st of September 1988 until 1990 he entered mandatory conscription service in the Bulgarian Armed Forces. From 1990 to 1995 he studied at the University of Forestry. in Sofia. From 1994 to 1998 – his second higher education was in television journalism at the "Faculty of Journalism and Mass Communication" at University of Sofia.

== Career ==
Since 1994, Karbovski has worked in almost all major Bulgarian newspapers, among which: Trud, 24 chasa, 168 Hours, Novinar, Standard. In 2002, Karbovski began cooperating with Kevork Kevorkian in the show Vsyaka nedelya (Bulgarian broadcast) on national television, where he made his "Regular Reporting" and "Subjective".

== Written books ==
- „Дефлорация" (1995), „Едно" (1998), „Обществен eXperiment" (2003), „Пътеписите" (2005)р, „Технология на естаза" (2009), „Нещата" (2011)
