= Nova Sport (Bulgaria) =

Bulgarian sports television channel

- Country: Bulgaria
- Broadcast area: Bulgaria
- Headquarters: Sofia, Bulgaria

Programming
- Language(s): Bulgarian
- Picture format: 1080i HDTV (downscaled to 16:9 576i for the SDTV feed

Ownership
- Owner: United Group
- Parent: Nova Broadcasting Group
- Sister channels: Nova; Kino Nova; Nova News; Diema; Diema Family; Diema Sport; Diema Sport 2; Diema Sport 3; The Voice; Magic TV

History
- Launched: 30 April 2010
- Replaced: MM

Nova Sport is a Bulgarian sports television channel, part of Nova Broadcasting Group, owned by United Group. The channel launched in 2010 and replaced the music channel MM. It broadcasts live sports events like football, boxing, athletics, golf, basketball, volleyball and others. The television was created with resemblance to the Scandinavian channel Viasat Sport, owned by Modern Times Group (then owner of Nova Broadcasting Group), which shares the same graphic package.

== Nova Premier League HD ==
On 2 April 2012, MTG launched a 24/7 HD channel – Nova Premier League HD – that broadcasts only Premier League football in high definition. It was distributed from Viasat and broadcast from London. It aired Premier League-related magazines, studio programs, and live, delayed and classic matches every day around the clock. The channel is created as resemblance to the Scandinavian channel Viasat Premier League HD and uses the same graphic package as Viasat Fotboll. The channel closed on 1 June 2013 as the main channel Nova Sport began broadcasting in HD from 29 July 2013.

== List of sports events transmitted by Nova Sport and Diema Sport ==
- Bulgarian A Football Group
- Premier League
- Bulgarian Cup
- Ligue 1
- DFB-Pokal
- UEFA European Football Championship – qualifications
- Football League Championship
- Football League Cup
- Boxing
- FA Cup

== Logos ==
Former channel Nova Premier League HD logo

Proposed Nova Sport logo
