= Diema =

Bulgarian television channel

DIEMA
- Country: Bulgaria
- Broadcast area: Bulgaria
- Headquarters: Sofia, Bulgaria

Programming
- Language: Bulgarian
- Picture format: 16:9 576i (DVB); 4:3 480p (DVB); 4:3 720p (DVB)

Ownership
- Owner: United Group
- Parent: Nova Broadcasting Group
- Sister channels: Nova; Kino Nova; Nova News; Nova Sport; Diema Family; Diema Sport; Diema Sport 2; Diema Sport 3; The Voice; Magic TV

History
- Launched: 15 May 1999
- Former names: Diema+ (1999-2007)

Links
- Website: http://www.diema.bg/

DIEMA (Bulgarian: Диема) is a Bulgarian television channel, part of Nova Broadcasting Group, owned by United Group. The channel airs mainly films and action series. Along with Nova Sport and Diema Sport airs sports, including matches from the English FA Premier League, the FA Cup and the UEFA European Football Championship qualifications, as well as the England national football team home matches.

== History ==
Diema Vision was founded on 15 May 1999 by Emil Slavchev, Kalina Mihaylova, Anatoli Belchev and Asen Radulov. The first owned channel was Diema +. Initially it broadcast 12 hours a day, starting a 24-hour schedule in November 1999. Over the years, the channel proved popular, and the company launched a second channel - Diema 2, in 2003. At the end of 2005, it was sold to Apace Media, owned by Kamen Vodenicharov. In March 2007, Diema Vision became part of Balkan Media Group Limited, a joint venture between Apace Media Group UK and the international entertainment-broadcasting group Modern Times Group MTG AB and re-branded the main channel only as Diema, dropping the "plus" from its name. In March 2009, MTG announced an agreement that would see the assets of Balkan Media Group Limited merge with the newly acquired Nova television. On 12 September 2011, the channel changed its look and logo again alongside the other Nova TV channels.
