= Etazhna sobstvenost (TV series) =

- Етажна собственост
- Genre: Comedy
- Written by: Ivan Angelov; Stefan Stoyanov; Zlatina Nestorova; Silviya Tsonkova
- Directed by: Yulian Minkov; Todor Nikolov
- Starring: Anton Radichev; Nadya Savova; Yavor Gigov; Militsa Gladnishka; Milena Markova; Nevena Bozukova; Stanimir Gumov
- Country of origin: Bulgaria
- Original language: Bulgarian
- No. of seasons: 4
- No. of episodes: 48

Production
- Executive producer: Hidalgo Productions
- Producer: Krasi Vankov
- Running time: 45 minutes

Original release
- Network: Nova television
- Release: 29 September 2011 – 30 May 2013

Etazhna sobstvenost (Bulgarian: Етажна собственост) (English: Condominium) is a Bulgarian sitcom produced by Nova television (Bulgaria). Producer of the series is Krasimir Vankov. Directors of the series are Julian Minkov and Todor Nikolov and writers - Ivan Angelov, Stefan Stoyanov, Zlatina Nestorova and Sylvia Tsonkova. Operators are Kutsarov Stefan and Alex Samoungi. Film installation is Georgi Yordanov and Elena Seymenova.

== History ==
Etazhna sobstvenost in Bulgarian means "condominium" and Season 1 was released in 2011. The action takes place in Sofia (Nadezhda Borough).

The series was filmed block of flats, not a studio. The characters live in an old, Panelák building. They were trying to face the negative side of the Bulgarian national psychology and other household problems-poverty, lack of money and annoying relatives (and neighbours).

Since Season 3, the action was developing in a new building, because the old one was ruined. It was due to the fault of Tsekov (a contractor).

== Actors ==
- Anton Radichev - Edelweiss Dzhambazov; young retiree, went on a mission in Cambodia living in blocks
- Nadya Savova - grandmother Tsetsa Drambozova; Velichko's mother, mother-in-law of Mimi, landlady of Geri beloved grandfather Stefcho, gossip
- Yavor Gigov - Velichko Drambozov; Tsetsa's son, husband of Mimi, house manager of the unit tester products
- Militza Gladnishka - Mimi Drambozova; Velichko's wife, daughter grandmother Tsetsa, former shot-out player
- Milena Markova - Geri; tenant of grandmother Tsetsa, owner of the salon in the block
- Nevena Bozukova - Temenuga Balabanova; Geri's roommate (season 1), wife of Zhoro (season 2) works in the salon
- Stanimir Gumov - Zhivko Zdravkov; Owner of Funeral bloc

== Episodes ==
Seasons	Timeslot	Channel	TV Season	Episodes	Premiere	Finale
1	Thursday, 9:00 PM	Nova TV	2011 (Fall)	12	September 29, 2011	December 31, 2011
2	Thursday, 9:00 PM	Nova TV	2012 (Spring)	12	March 15, 2012	May 31, 2012
3	Thursday, 9:00 PM	Nova TV	2012 (Fall)	12	September 20, 2012	December 6, 2012
4	Thursday, 9:00 PM	Nova TV	2013 (Spring)	12	March 7, 2013	May 30, 2013
