= Vsyaka nedelya =

"Vsyaka Nedelya" (Bulgarian: Всяка неделя, literally "Every Sunday") is a Bulgarian television program hosted and edited by journalist Kevork Kevorkian. It is one of the most successful television shows on Bulgarian television.

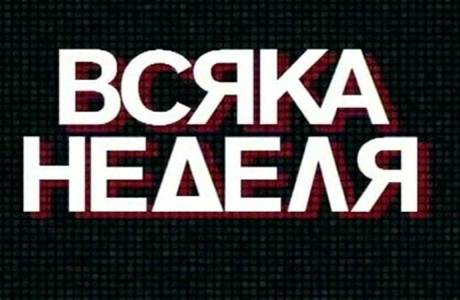
Vsyaka nedelya logo, 1999

== History ==
The first episode aired January 7, 1979 on BNT 1. "Vsyaka Nedelya" was initially under the "Information" category and the successor to the program "TV Lens." It was taken off the air on four separate occasions. The host of the original show was Yancho Takov. Kevork Kevorkian has interviewed hundreds of famous and significant people from Bulgaria and around the world, including Todor Zhivkov, Radoy Ralin, Georgi Partsalev, Slavi Trifonov and others. The team behind the show is one of the first to have created a nationwide donation movement; over 3 million leva have been collected, with which about 100 soldiers' monuments were restored.

== Original network ==
From 1979 to 2005, the program was aired on BNT 1. From 2012 to 2014, the program aired on Nova.
