= Margarita Mihneva =

Bulgarian investigative journalist and presenter (1952–2024)

- Маргарита Димитрова Михнева
- Born: April 21, 1952; Sofia, Bulgaria
- Died: December 16, 2024 (aged 72); Geneva, Switzerland
- Education: Sofia University
- Occupations: Investigative journalist, television reporter
- Years active: 1975–2021
- Employer: Bulgarian National Television
- Known for: Bulgaria's first female investigative journalist
- Children: 1

Margarita Dimitrova Mihneva (Bulgarian: Маргарита Димитрова Михнева; 21 April 1952 – 16 December 2024) was one of Bulgaria's first investigative journalists. She was a pioneer for women in Bulgarian journalism, and one of the country's most recognizable television presenters and reporters.

== Life and career ==
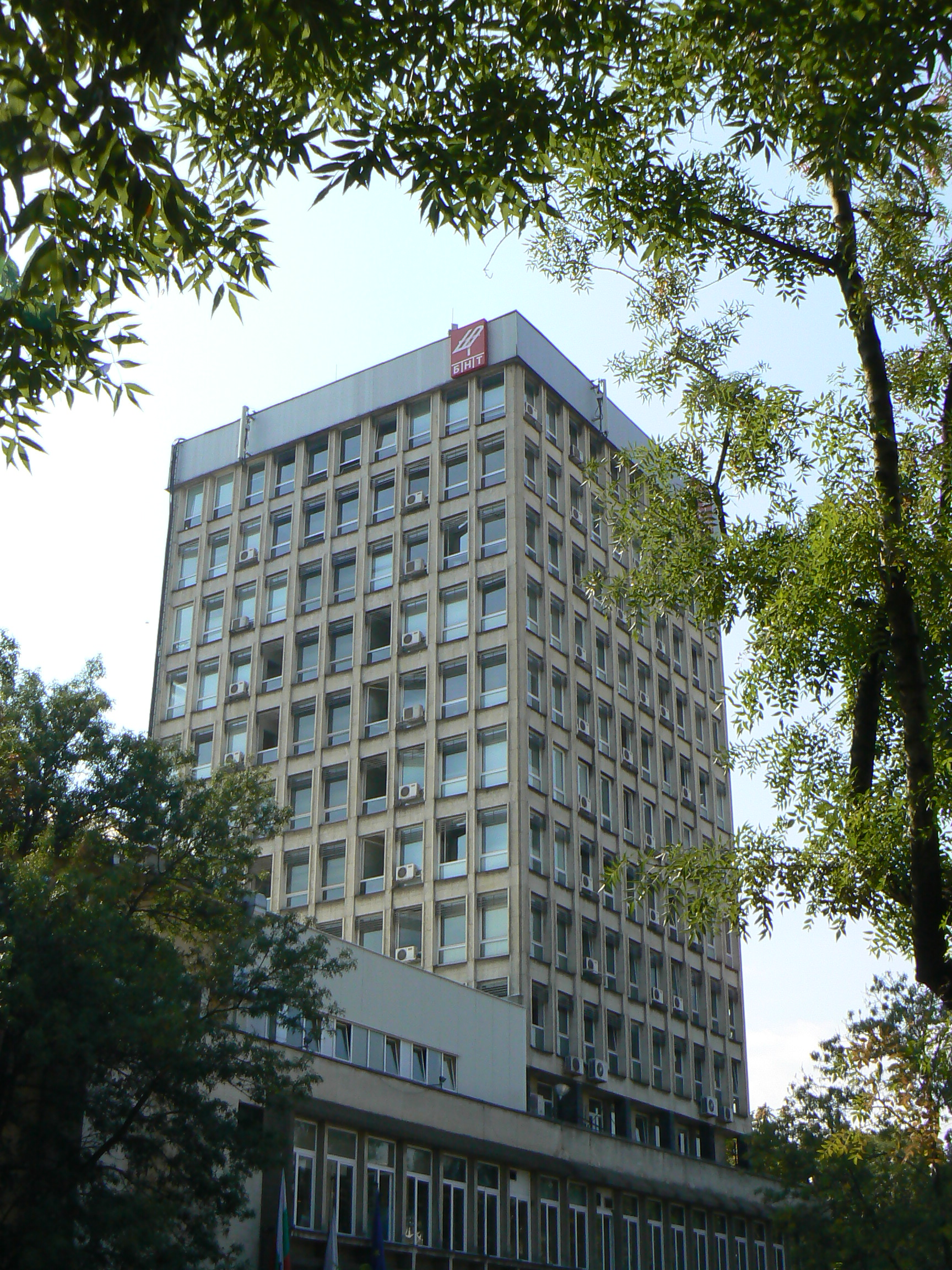
The main building of the Bulgarian National Television, where Mihneva found her first job in journalism.

Mihneva was born on 21 April 1952, in Sofia. In 1974, she graduated from Sofia University with a degree in law. After graduation, she applied for a position with Bulgarian National Television, securing one of two places against 150 different candidates.

In 1975, she started working at Bulgarian National Television, working on the programs: Labor, Interests and Law, Current Antenna, Surveys and Panorama.

In 1989 Mihneva covered the "Revival Process" and the "Big Excursion", Bulgarian campaigns directed at ethnic Turks in Bulgaria.

From 1992 to 1999, Mihneva hosted the show Conflicts on Bulgarian National Television. The program, produced on a low budget achieved high ratings by addressing issues such as government corruption, moral leadership and Bulgarian democracy. Mihneva described her work, "Journalistic investigation is a deadly battle with power - both then and now."

Mihneva was often subject to legal suits due to her investigative reporting, with her home and business being seized to support legal cases against her. She made history by becoming the first Bulgarian journalist to win lawsuits against a newspaper editor and a television director.

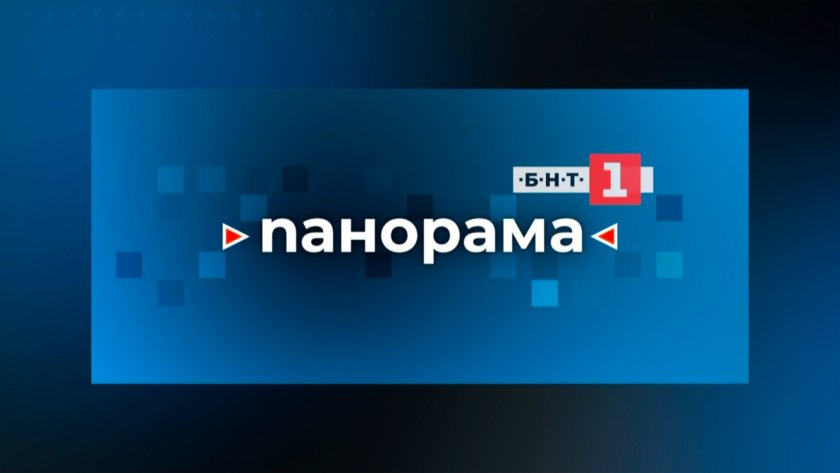
BNT's Panorama programme, which Mihneva appeared on.

She was highly critical of corruption in Bulgarian politics and business, themes that would regularly appear in her reporting and make her a figure of contention in Bulgarian society. Among the figures she sought to expose in her reporting was Tsvetan Vassilev, whose Corporate Commercial Bank collapsed in 2014 after a bank run. In 2018, she was found culpable by the Supreme Court of Cassation of defamation against fellow journalist Sonya Koltuklieva, whom Mihneva reported had paid off Vassilev to promote good press about his company before it collapsed.

Mihneva's outspoken character and visibility on news programmes made her a highly public character in Bulgaria, where her personal life and legal concerns were a regular news item. She claimed to have been fired from roles as a journalist 11 times for her reporting, and after her last dismissal had retired and was living on a small pension. After retiring from journalism, she would often appear on Bulgarian television in guest spots as a panelist and presenter.

In 2017 she reportedly was invited to participate in VIP Brother, Bulgaria's version of Big Brother, but turned it down. In her later years she was supported by her daughter who had emigrated to Switzerland.

=== Personal life and death ===
Mihneva married professional tennis player, ski and golf star Petar Mikhnev and had a daughter, who would become a Bulgarian tennis champion. The couple later divorced.

In the early 2000s, Mihneva was diagnosed and was treated for breast cancer. She underwent her first cancer surgery at age 50. At the time, she claimed the stress of her work was making her sick.

In 2021, Mihneva was diagnosed with bone cancer, two decades after successfully fighting breast cancer. She underwent emergency surgery, which resulted in the removal of three ribs. After her diagnosis, she committed herself to continuing her career while fighting cancer for a second time. Mihneva's second cancer battle depleted her mental and physical health.

Mikhneva died from cancer in Geneva, Switzerland, on 16 December 2024, at the age of 72.

After her death, the president of Bulgaria Rumen Radov expressed his condolences to the family, "Her professionalism as a journalist and presenter remains a shining example for future generations, who had dedicated themselves to the mission of upholding truth and justice..."
