= Viasat 1 =

- Country: Ghana
- Headquarters: Labone, Accra, Ghana

Programming
- Language: English

Ownership
- Owner: Modern Times Group (MTG)

History
- Launched: December 12, 2008
- Closed: 2016
- Replaced by: Kwesé Free Sports

Links
- Website: Viasat1 website

Viasat 1 was a Ghanaian television channel owned by the Modern Times Group. It was replaced by Kwesé Sports in 2016.

The channel was awarded a licence from the National Communications Authority of the Republic of Ghana in December 2007 and started broadcasting on December 12, 2008, on 6 p.m. The first programme on the channel was the movie Duma, followed by The Cosby Show, Friends and CSI: Crime Scene Investigation.

Viasat 1 was MTG's first venture in Africa and became the fifth terrestrial television network in Ghana after GTV, Metro TV, TV3 and TV Africa.

== Ownership ==
In December 2016, MTG sold its African business (Viasat 1 (Ghana), TV1 (Tanzania) and Modern African Production (MAP)) to Econet Wireless.

== Programs ==
Before the channel was sold, Viasat 1 broadcast the following programs:

=== Series ===
- Bones
- Charmed
- CSI: Crime Scene Investigation
- CSI: Miami
- CSI: NY
- The Firm
- Ghost Whisperer
- Grey's Anatomy
- NCIS: Los Angeles
- The Walking Dead

=== Kids ===
- Action Man
- Bernard
- Bob the Builder
- Dex Hamilton: Alien Entomologist
- Gormiti
- Handy Manny
- Hannah Montana
- Kassai and Luk
- Magic Cellar
- Men in Black: The Series
- Oscar's Oasis
- Pair of Kings
- Pula and Friends
- Supa Strikas
- Tales from Africa
- Tinga Tinga Tales
- Transformers: Animated
- X-Men

=== News ===
- Viasat 1 News

=== Talk shows ===
- Boys Boys
- The One Show
- The Oprah Winfrey Show
- This Morning

=== Game shows ===
- It Runs in the Family

=== Sitcoms ===
- The Bernie Mac Show
- Everybody Hates Chris
- Friends
- The Game
- Girlfriends
- Pair of Kings
- Two and a Half Men

=== Drama ===
- Alma Indomable
- Dahil May Isang Ikaw
- En nombre del amor
- Eva Luna
- Generations
- Grey's Anatomy
- Hard Copy
- Jozi
- La que no podía amar
- The Lab
- Los Querendones
- Pasión de gavilanes
- Sa Piling Mo
- Sacrificio de mujer
- Soy tu dueña
- Tinsel
- Tormenta en el paraíso
- Un refugio para el amor
- Una maid en Manhattan
- La Tempestad

=== Reality shows ===
- America's Next Top Model
- Born Star

=== Lifestyle ===
- Catwalk Kenya
- Dance Africa
- Mzanzi Ridez
- Studio 53

=== Sports ===
- Football 360
- Premier League
- Serie A
- Sport Science
- Sports Xtra
- The World Game
