= MM (TV channel) =

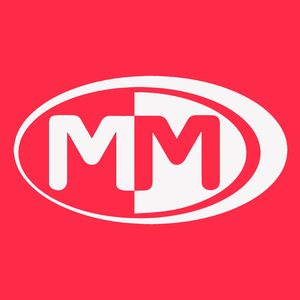
- Country: Bulgaria
- Headquarters: Sofia

Programming
- Language: Bulgarian
- Picture format: 16:9 (DVB)

Ownership
- Owner: MM New Media Group Ltd
- Sister channels: M2 (2003-2007)

History
- Launched: 5 March 1997
- Closed: 30 April 2010
- Replaced by: Nova Sport

Links
- Website: mmtvmusic.com

Availability

Streaming media
- Watch online: mmtvmusic.com/live

MMTV (Bulgarian: ММ) was a Bulgarian 24/7 online TV channel that started as cable and satellite music television channel in 1997 and had a profound impact on the modern popular culture in Bulgaria. The MM Annual Music Awards were at their time the most important event in the Bulgarian music scene.

== History ==
MM was created by Vihren Karaytchev and Toni Tanov in 1997 as the first Bulgarian television channel to play music videos, the program being similar to MTV's, presented real-time by hosts known as VJs. Nelly Ifandieva was MM's first host, soon joined by Ina Grigorova, Kiril Bozhilov-Kiko and Stoyan Mihalev. In the spring of 1998, Yana Krispin was welcomed as a host, followed by Radoslav Kavaldjiev-Roro, Rumyana Blagoeva-Rumi, Stefka Gagamova-Guti, Milena Alexandrova - Alex, Vasil Katincharov, Mihail Vuchkov and many more. MM produced a variety of TV shows appealing to diverse audiences. A year after its launch, MM started its national broadcast.

MM's first Annual Music Awards were held in 1999, establishing the media as the leader in Bulgaria's entertainment industry until it was discontinued in 2010.

By the early 2000s, MM Television was broadcast by more than 160 cable and satellite operators in Bulgaria reaching a potential audience of 4.3 million people. In 2003, it started a sister channel - M2, which only played the videos of Bulgarian bands and artists. In 2005 MM founded MM Records, a proprietary record label.

In 2005 Apace Media Group acquired 66% of the television channel for €660,000. The media company planned to upgrade the TV studios and to continue developing the music-orientated programming. Actually very little of this happened. MM once again changed its ownership in 2007 becoming part of the Balkan Media Group (a joint venture of Apace Media Group and Modern Times Group). 2007 saw major cuts in the television channel's finances as many of the TV shows were discontinued as well as its sister channel M2. In the beginning of 2009 MM dropped all its shows from its programming and started only to broadcast music videos. With its revenues continually falling after the restructuring of MM's programming, in 2010, after 13 years of existence, the channel owners decided to discontinue it as 'it operates in an over-saturated niche market with many other music channels available in the country, while the potential audience tends to change their way to consume music' (according to the channel's executive director Jacob Anderson's statement in April 2010). After ceasing cable transmission on 30 April 2010, MM Television was replaced by the newly founded sports television channel Nova Sport.

On 10 September 2016 MM Television was relaunched as online TV channel with 24/7 streaming on www.mmtvmusic.com and IPTV/OTT in Bulgaria on Bulsatcom Fusion, Vivacom, SKAT, Net1 and 32 other local IPTV platforms. Worldwide MMTV broadcast can be watched through its partners Neterra, Elemental TV, BG time, TVbg. The new owners of MM Television are former employees of the music channel who spent the last 16 years living and working in London, United Kingdom. MM New Media Group Ltd acquired the rights for the brand and all merchandise involved. Since 2017 MMTV online has been media partner of several prominent European festivals like Eurosonic Noorderslag, EXIT Festival and Amsterdam Dance Event. Their production crew has filmed specials from the festivals as well as interviews with popular musicians and DJs. In 2019 MMTV aired a weekend dedicated to the EXIT Festival with a special selection of filmed shows given to the channel by the organisers.

== MM's Annual Music Awards ==
In 1998 MM started organising its own MM's Annual Music Awards. The show soon became one of the most respected events on the modern Bulgarian music scene that gathered the most popular Bulgarian bands and artists each year. The annual music awards were presented until 2007 when a MM's Decennial Music Awards were organised. The event marked the ten-year anniversary of MM's but eventually turned out to be the last show of this kind to be organised by the television channel.

== Notes ==
1.As of 10 September 2016 only online broadcasting.
