= Kanal 3 =

- Country: Bulgaria
- Headquarters: Sofia

Programming
- Language: Bulgarian
- Picture format: 16:9 SD/HD

Ownership
- Owner: Nova Broadcasting Group

History
- Launched: October 30, 1993 March 3, 2023
- Replaced: Sofia Cable

Links
- Website: Official website

Kanal 3 (Channel 3, Bulgarian: Канал 3) is a Bulgarian television channel, initially started exclusively on the operator Sofia Kabel (Sofia Cable) in 1993. Until 1998 the television was called Sofia Kabel. Between 1998 and 2014, journalists such as Sasho Dikov, Lili Marinkova, Yulian Vuchkov, Margarita Mihneva and others had been working in the channel. Famous shows from that period were "1:1", "Yellowness", "The Inconvenient", "Out of Paradise" and "The Power of Fashion".

In late 2013, the channel received a major rebrand for the first time since its creation and began broadcasting news bulletins every hour. Between 2014 and 2016, Kanal 3 broadcast the Bulgarian Second Professional Football League, as well as the finals of the Cup of Bulgarian Amateur Football League. The channel also enriched its programming with new TV programs, including "Every Afternoon with Chrissy", "The Day Live" with Maya Kostadinova, "Offensive" with Lubo Ognyanov and "Benovska Asks".

In December 2014, Kanal 3 temporarily ceased broadcasting due to a fire at the studios of the channel. Since February 2015, Kanal 3 has broadcast in 16:9 and since September 2017, in HD. The channel started terrestrial broadcasting in Sofia in December 2016.

In February 2020, Kanal 3 became part of BSS media group, related to the politician Delyan Peevski. In 2015, Peevski attempted to buy the channel but due to a public outrage the deal wasn't finalized, even though it was approved by the Commission on Protection of Competition.

On September 1, 2020, Nova Broadcasting Group submitted documents to the Commission on Protection of Competition for the acquisition of Kanal 3, along with the other media part of BSS media group. The deal was approved on September 18.

On December 3, 2020, Nova Broadcasting Group announced that starting on January 4, 2021, the channel will be called Nova News. The new channel will be news sequel of Nova Television and will broadcast news bulletins every hour, with also retaining most of the TV programs from Kanal 3, including "Patarinski LIVE", "The Day Live" and "Offensive".

On December 14, 2020, Kanal 3 ceased broadcasting news and until its closure, started airing reruns of its regular programs. On the same day, the channel's website was closed and started redirecting to Nova Television's website.

On March 3, 2023, Kanal 3 was relaunched as a separate channel from Nova News. The new channel's license would be registered by the regional cable operator "Dobrudzha Kabel". As of March 2025, the channel is available on cable, satellite, IPTV, and on the web.
