= Zoomin.TV =

Dutch multi-channel network and media company

Zoomin
- Company type: Media company, Online content
- Founded: 2000
- Headquarters: Schiphol-Rijk, the Netherlands
- Owner: Azerion
- Website: http://zoomin.tv/

Zoomin was a media and entertainment company located in the Netherlands. Zoomin specialized in custom video production for commercial use.

== History ==
Zoomin was founded in 2000 as a video production agency specializing in commercial projects. MTG acquired a majority stake in Zoomin in July 2015 and took full ownership in May 2018. In October 2019, Azerion acquired Zoomin from MTG. Headquartered in Amsterdam, Azerion is a digital entertainment and media agency that produces commercial content and advertising strategy for businesses.

== Original content ==
Zoomin produced short-form video content from its worldwide network of video journalists. It produced ten unique new videos a day in English, which were localized in nine additional languages through its in-house production facilities. The stories were about entertainment, life-style, sports, fashion, and character-driven stories.

== See also ==
- Multi Channel Network
- Cost Per Mille
- Cost Per Impression
- YouTube
- List of YouTube personalities
