= Zabranena Lyubov =

Soap opera

- Also known as: Forbidden Love(International title)
- Забранена любов
- Genre: Soap opera
- Created by: Reg Watson
- Starring: Fahradin Fahradinov; Diana Lyubenova; Sanya Borisova; Nikolay Iliev
- Country of origin: Bulgaria
- Original language: Bulgarian
- No. of episodes: 299

Production
- Executive producer: Ivaylo Vandov
- Running time: approx. 23 minutes

Original release
- Network: Nova Television
- Release: October 5, 2008 – May 5, 2011

Zabranena Lyubov (Bulgarian: Забранена любов, lit. "Forbidden Love") was a soap opera filmed in Bulgaria. Its broadcasting started on 5 October 2008, at 20:00 on Nova Television and its first season ended on 5 June 2009. It was also aired in Croatia. The soap opera was based on the Australian TV series Sons and Daughters.

The soap opera rotates around two Sofia families, the affluent Konstantinovs and the low-income Belevs, who are mainly linked together by a central theme of love. It not only deals with the love of siblings who are unaware of each other, but also life in contemporary Bulgarian society. It has tackled controversial issues during its first season such as: murder, arson, kidnapping, abortion, homosexuality, rape, teacher-pupil relations and so on.

Its second season started in autumn of 2009. Bulgaria's Prime Minister Boyko Borisov also had a part in one episode as himself.

== Characters ==
The main protagonists consist of two families, the Konstantinovs and the Belevs.

| Character | Actor | Background |
|---|---|---|
| Anastasiya Konstantinova | Diana Lyubenova | |
| Boris Konstantinov | Todor Tanchev | |
| Martin Konstantinov | Nikolay Iliev | |
| Elitsa Konstantinova | Sanya Borisova | |
| Yavor Belev | Fahradin Fahradinov | |
| Dimitar Belev | Ivaylo Geraskov | |
| Nadezhda Beleva | Albena Stavreva | |
| Filip Belev | Plamen Dimov | |
| Marina Beleva | Iliyana Kodzhabasheva | |
