= BNT 2 =

Bulgarian television network

BNT 2 (БНТ 2)
- Logo since 2018
- Country: Bulgaria
- Broadcast area: Bulgaria
- Headquarters: Sofia, Bulgaria

Programming
- Language: Bulgarian
- Picture format: 576i (SDTV) 16:9; 1080i (HDTV) 16:9

Ownership
- Owner: Bulgarian National Television
- Sister channels: BNT 1, BNT 3, BNT 4

History
- Launched: 9 September 1975 (original channel); 16 October 2011 (relaunch)
- Replaced: BNT Sofia, BNT Pirin, BNT Sever, BNT Plovdiv, BNT More (relaunch)
- Closed: 1 June 2000 0:38 (Original channel)
- Replaced by: bTV (original channel)
- Former names: Second Programme (1975–1992); Efir 2 (1992–2000)

Links
- Webcast: http://tv.bnt.bg/bnt2 (Bulgaria only)
- Website: http://bnt.bg/bnt2/

Availability

Terrestrial
- MUX3: Channel 7

BNT 2 (Bulgarian: БНТ 2, romanized: Be ne te dve) is a Bulgarian-language public television station, operated by Bulgarian National Television. It is the successor to the defunct second program of the national television - Efir 2.

Launched on October 16, 2011, the channel replaced the five regional television centers of BNT - BNT Pirin, BNT More, BNT Sever, BNT Plovdiv and BNT Sofia by combining their programs into one. Until 2018, BNT 2 broadcast original programs, newscasts and sporting events. The program includes a "regional programming bloc" with local opt-out broadcasts from BNT's regional television centers.

Since 2018, BNT 2 has ended its newscasts and is only currently mostly broadcasting cultural programs and programs produced by BNT's regional television centers (which includes local-based newscasts instead of sending local news production to be broadcast nationally).

== History ==
The second program of the Bulgarian national television was founded in 1975 and discontinued transmission on May 31, 2000, being replaced by the private bTV the following day. The frequencies were activated on September 9, 1974, at 11:30pm, on VHF channel 12 in Sofia, and then, regular broadcasts started on September 9, 1975, on Tuesdays, Thursdays and Saturdays, from 7pm to 10:30pm. Work on the national UHF transmitter network began in 1980.

Efir 2's most popular program was its weekly magazine show "Vsyaka Nedelya" (English: Every Sunday) and for broadcasting the Italian Serie A football games (which in fact were part of the same Sunday show).

From June 1, 1992, the channel was renamed Efir 2 as part of a channel rebrand exercise at BNT. Niri Terzieva became the channel's director. Under the rebrand, the channel employed pioneer techniques on Bulgarian television, such as having its own way to present the news, emphasis on live broadcasts and with author-based programming.

In October 1993, Efir 2 rebranded using a logo featuring five ovals (a left row of three RGB ovals and a right row of two plain white ovals) under the slogan "two is better than one". On January 1, 1994, Efir 2 switched from the SECAM standard to PAL.

In 1999, the Council of Ministers decided to privatize the second national television network. On July 26 of that year, BNT began to gradually wind down its operations, starting with the end of its own separate news team. At 21:10 on May 31, 2000, Efir 2 said "Good-bye!" to the Bulgarian viewers with a documental film, produced by Ekaterina Genova, called "Efir 2 - a photo for a memory" (Bulgarian: Ефир 2 - снимка за спомен). After the movie, Efir 2 broadcast its last news and sports reports, as well as its final commercial break, another movie, and Ricky Martin's "One night only". 40 minutes after midnight, Efir 2's signal was switched off, replaced by bTV the following morning.

In 2007, with the advent of digital terrestrial television, BNT announced its intent to reactivate the channel. On June 10, 2010, BNT obtained a license for BNT Sofia, a fifth regional channel. In late September 2011, the corporation decided to merge the five channels (BNT Sofia never launched as a standalone channel) into a new national channel, BNT 2, with regional opt-outs. Since BNT Sofia never began broadcasting, Sofia lacked analog terrestrial coverage for the service as of January 2012, despite the city having a relatively high rate of subscription television penetration.

The long running strand Leka nosht, deca moved from BNT 1 to this channel on September 9, 2019. On March 17, 2020, the channel started airing classes on television for seventh grade students, in response to school closures derived from the pandemic. These classes were relayed on international channel BNT 4.

== Programing ==
- S opera na BNT 2 (With the Opera at BNT 2)
- Leka nosht, deca (Good Night, Children; since 2019)
