= Mira Dobreva =

Bulgarian television personality

- Born: 12 August 1972 (age 53); Zlatograd, Bulgaria
- Occupation: Television news presenter
- Spouse: Joro Tornev
- Children: 2

Mira Dobreva (Bulgarian: Мира Добрева) (born 12 August 1972, in Zlatograd) is a Bulgarian TV news presenter recently working on Bulgarian National Television. She was the Bulgarian spokesperson for the Eurovision Song Contest 2007.

In 2009, she appeared in the first season of VIP Dance, the Bulgarian version of Strictly Come Dancing.

== Personal life ==
Her second marriage is to Bulgarian TV producer Joro Tornev.
