= BulgariaSat-1 =

Geostationary communications satellite

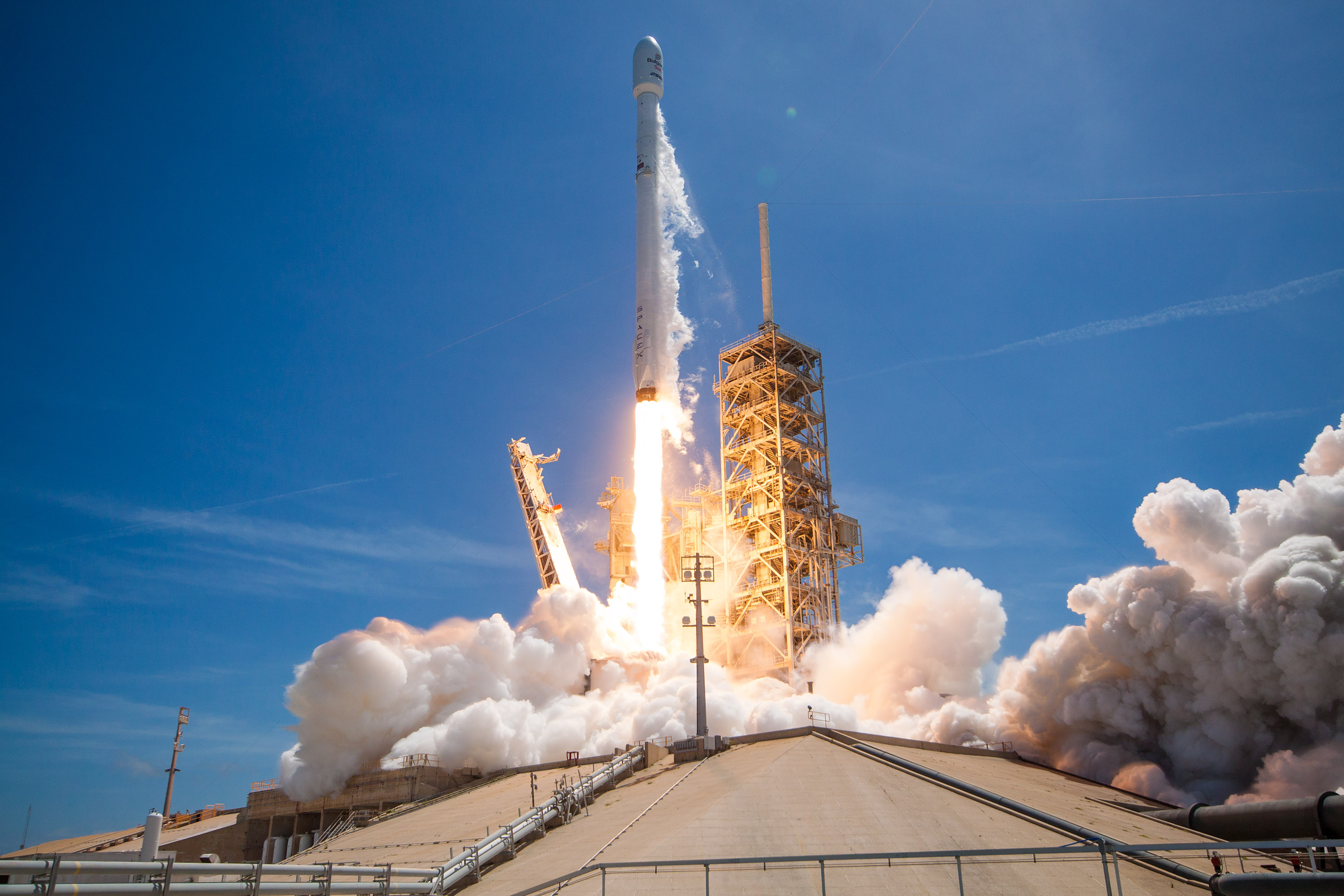
- BulgariaSat-1 launches on a Falcon 9
- Mission type: Communications
- Operator: Bulgaria Sat
- COSPAR ID: 2017-038A
- SATCAT no.: 42801
- Website: www.bulgariasat.com
- Mission duration: Planned: 15+ years Elapsed: 8 years, 10 months, 5 days

Spacecraft properties
- Bus: SSL 1300
- Manufacturer: SSL
- Launch mass: 3,669 kg (8,089 lb)
- Power: 10 kW

Start of mission
- Launch date: 19:10, 23 June 2017 (UTC)
- Rocket: Falcon 9 FT
- Launch site: Kennedy LC-39A
- Contractor: SpaceX

Orbital parameters
- Reference system: Geocentric
- Regime: Geostationary
- Longitude: 1.9° E

Transponders
- Band: 30 × K_{u} BSS transponders; 3 × K_{u} FSS transponders
- Coverage area: Balkans, Europe, Middle East, North Africa

BulgariaSat-1 is a geostationary communications satellite operated by Bulgaria Sat and manufactured by SSL. The satellite will provide high definition and ultra-high-definition television, very-small-aperture terminal (VSAT) communications, satellite news gathering relays, and other communications services, primarily to the Balkan Peninsula and Central/Western Europe.

== Spacecraft ==
BulgariaSat-1 is based on an intermediate-power variant of the SSL 1300 satellite bus with a 15+ year design life. Coupled with the boost provided by its Falcon 9 launch vehicle, it carries enough fuel for more than 18 years of service. Power is supplied by two three-panel solar arrays delivering 10 kilowatts, while propulsion is provided by an R-4D-11 hypergolic rocket engine supplemented by an array of attitude control thrusters. The spacecraft is equipped with 30 K_{u}-band broadcasting-satellite service (BSS) transponders and 3 K_{u}-band fixed-satellite service (FSS) transponders. It will be parked in geostationary orbit at 1.9° East.

BulgariaSat-1 is the first Bulgarian satellite to operate in geostationary orbit, and is the nation's second spacecraft after Bulgaria 1300 in 1981.

== History ==
SSL (formerly Space Systems/Loral) was announced in September 2014 to be the selected manufacturer of BulgariaSat-1. In addition, the company has partnered with Bulgaria Sat to secure financing, insurance, and the Falcon 9 launch vehicle. The Export–Import Bank of the United States has provided US$151 million in export credit financing to Bulgaria Sat. The CEO of Bulgaria Sat, Maxim Zayakov, stated that the total cost of the BulgariaSat-1 project was US$235 million.

At the time of SSL's contract award, BulgariaSat-1 was scheduled to launch by the end of 2016. Delays within SpaceX, including the loss of two Falcon 9 rockets, pushed the launch back to 15 June 2017; additional delays resulting from pressure within SpaceX's launch schedule and the need to replace a valve in the Falcon 9 launch fairing pushed the launch to 23 June.

SpaceX launched BulgariaSat-1 on 23 June 2017 from Kennedy Space Center Launch Complex 39A. The Falcon 9 first stage B1029 used to launch the spacecraft was previously flown for an Iridium NEXT mission in January 2017, only the second time that SpaceX had reflown a booster. This booster successfully landed on the SpaceX drone ship Of Course I Still Love You after completing its BulgariaSat-1 flight.

In mid-July 2017, Bulgaria Sat stated that during its intensive preparations for commercial operations on the satellite, all systems of BulgariaSat-1 were functioning normally. By the time of launch, the satellite had been targeted to be operational in early August 2017 but this was pushed back to later in the year.

Bulgaria Sat will use Ericsson equipment for the distribution of ultra-high-definition television to the Balkans region.

== Bulgaria Sat ==
Bulgaria Sat, headquartered in Sofia, Bulgaria, is the country's only owner of its own satellite. The company provides satellite communications to broadcast, telecom, corporate and government customers. Bulgaria Sat is an affiliate of Bulsatcom, the largest provider of pay-TV services in Bulgaria.

== Awards ==
Bulgaria Sat, Bulgaria's sole satellite operator and the country's innovator in space industry, was awarded "Newcomer Satellite Operator of the Year" for 2017 during the 14th Annual Awards for Excellence in Satellite Communications which took place as part of the Summit for Satellite Financing, the main event of the annual World Satellite Business Week 2017. The ceremony took place on 13 September in Paris, France.
