= Diema Sport =

Bulgarian sports television channel

- Country: Bulgaria
- Broadcast area: Bulgaria
- Headquarters: Sofia, Bulgaria

Programming
- Language: Bulgarian
- Picture format: 4K UHD; 1080i HDTV (downscaled to 16:9 576i for the SDTV feed

Ownership
- Owner: United Group
- Parent: Nova Broadcasting Group
- Sister channels: Nova; Kino Nova; Nova News; Nova Sport; Diema; Diema Family; Diema Sport 2; Diema Sport 3; The Voice; Magic TV

History
- Launched: 21 February 2015
- Former names: Diema Extra (2005–2007)

Links
- Website: diemaxtra.nova.bg

Diema Sport (Bulgarian: Диема Спорт) is a Bulgarian paid sports television channel, part of Nova Broadcasting Group, owned by United Group. It is part of Diema Extra premium sport package, which also includes the channels Diema Sport 2, Diema Sport 3 and Trace Sports Stars HD. The channel broadcasts premium live sports events such as the Bulgarian A Football Group, Premier League. The channel also features magazine sports shows, commentator sports studios and talk shows.

== Diema Extra ==
Diema Extra (Bulgarian: Диема Екстра) is a Bulgarian premium paid channel which launched in April 2005. It aired films and other series, as well as sports events mostly from the English and Spanish Football Leagues. Later, most of these programs were moved to the other Diema Vision channels, as few people signed up for the service, and advertising proved more profitable. In September 2007 Diema Extra was finally closed after Diema Vision was sold to Apace Media.

On 21 February 2015 Diema Extra was relaunched as a premium sport package, initially containing the channels Diema Sport and Trace Sports Stars HD. On 8 August 2015, Diema Sport 2 was launched, followed by Diema Sport 3 on 1 July 2021. All these channels under the Diema Extra package aired matches from the two highest echelons of the Bulgarian football championship, the matches for the Bulgarian Cup, matches from the English Premier League, First and Second Bundesliga and French League 1, League Cup and FA Cup, German Football Cup, NBA basketball matches, Bulgarian volleyball championships, Formula 1 races and many other sports events.

== Logos ==
Diema Extra channel logo (2005-2007)

Diema Extra pack logo

Diema Sport HD logo

Diema Sport 2 logo

Diema Sport 3 logo
