= BNT 3 =

Bulgarian television network

BNT 3 (БНТ 3)
- Country: Bulgaria
- Network: Bulgarian National Television
- Headquarters: Sofia, Bulgaria

Programming
- Language: Bulgarian
- Picture format: 1080i HDTV (downscaled to 16:9 576i for the SDTV feed; terrestrial only)

Ownership
- Owner: Bulgarian National Television
- Sister channels: BNT 1, BNT 2, BNT 4

History
- Launched: 6 February 2014
- Former names: BNT HD (2014–2018)

Links
- Webcast: http://tv.bnt.bg/bnt3 (Bulgaria only)
- Website: bnt.bg/bnt3/shows

Availability

Terrestrial
- MUX 3: Channel 64

BNT 3 (Bulgarian: БНТ 3, romanized: Be ne te tri, previously BNT HD) is a Bulgarian-language public television station, operated by Bulgarian National Television. It broadcasts sport events, movies and cultural programs.

== History ==
It was launched on February 6, 2014 as "BNT HD" with the start of the Sochi 2014 Olympic Games. Beforehand, BNT used to air sports events such as the 2010 FIFA World Cup and the London 2012 Olympics in HD on temporary HD channels which used to upscale the BNT 1 channel. In 2014, the national television decided to launch BNT HD as a fully scheduled channel. On 10 September 2018, the channel was re-branded as BNT 3. BNT 3 airs free-to-air on the Bulgarian DVB-T platform.

Some of the shows aired include The World Sailing Show, Monster Jam (автомобилно шоу), Extreme E - Electric Odyssey, and One Water Race.

== Former logos ==
First BNT HD logo used 2014–2018

BNT 3 logo since 2018
