= Diema Family =

- Country: Bulgaria
- Broadcast area: Bulgaria
- Headquarters: Sofia, Bulgaria

Programming
- Language(s): Bulgarian
- Picture format: 16:9 576i (DVB); 4:3 480p (DVB); 4:3 720p (DVB)

Ownership
- Owner: United Group
- Parent: Nova Broadcasting Group
- Sister channels: Nova; Kino Nova; Nova News; Nova Sport; Diema; Diema Sport; Diema Sport 2; Diema Sport 3; The Voice; Magic TV

History
- Launched: 3 July 2006 (as Diema Family); 1 August 1999 (as Alexandra TV)
- Former names: Alexandra TV (1999–2006)

Links
- Website: http://diemafamily.nova.bg/

Diema Family is a Bulgarian television channel, part of Nova Broadcasting Group, owned by United Group.

== History ==
The television was established on 1 August 1999 under the name Alexandra TV as a film channel. On 3 July 2006 the channel was sold to Diema Vision and was rebranded to Diema Family, retooling its program towards families. In 2007, it became a part of Apace Media, and from 2011 it was a part of MTG's Nova TV Group, changing its logo and packaging again and retooling its schedule once more, this time it aired mainly Turkish series and Latin American telenovelas, alongside reruns of some programs from the Nova TV channel. In March 2010, it began broadcasting Big Brother Family live from its house, being scheduled on weekdays from 9:30 to 12:00 and on Saturday and Sunday until 12:15. On 1 April 2011 on the children's block, it broadcast the cartoons "Balls" and "New Adventures of Batman"; as of 4 April, it was suspended for an indefinite period. New graphics package and a new logo were introduced on 8 April 2019.

== Logos history ==
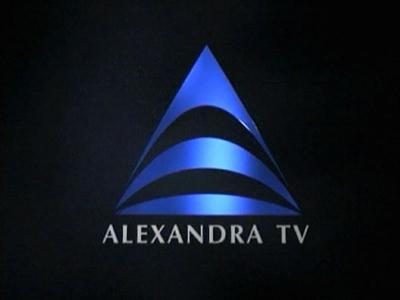
Alexandra TV logo used 1999-2006

First Diema Family logo used 2006-2007

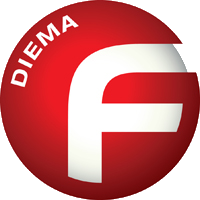
Second Diema Family logo, used 2007-2011

Third Diema Family logo, used 2011-2019

Fifth Diema Family logo, used 2019–present
