= BNT 4 =

Bulgarian international television network

BNT 4 (БНТ 4)
- Country: Bulgaria
- Broadcast area: International
- Headquarters: Sofia, Bulgaria

Programming
- Language: Bulgarian
- Picture format: HDTV 1080i (downscaled to 16:9 576i for the SD feed)

Ownership
- Owner: Bulgarian National Television
- Sister channels: BNT 1, BNT 2, BNT 3

History
- Launched: 2 May 1999
- Former names: TV Bulgaria (1999–2008); BNT Sat (2008–2010); BNT World (2010–2018)

Links
- Webcast: http://tv.bnt.bg/bnt4
- Website: http://www.bnt.bg/bnt4/shows

BNT 4 (Bulgarian: БНТ 4, romanized: Be ne te chetiri, previously BNT World and BNT Sat) is a Bulgarian-language public international television channel owned and operated by Bulgarian National Television.

BNT 4 broadcasts by satellite free to air. The channel currently offers a wide range of programs from news to culture, such as news reports, music shows, documentaries, and talk shows. In the past, the channel also produced programs catering the Bulgarian diaspora; original production will resume by late 2026.

== History ==
The channel was launched on 2 May 1999 under the name "TV Bulgaria" using a Eurelsat satellite to deliver its signal to Europe, the Middle East, North Africa and parts of Asia. From 2000 to 2004 it was delivered to North America using the Telstar 5 satellite. The first program director of TV Bulgaria was Agnesa Vasileva. The channel began with the repetition of the best fund of the BNT, Bulgarian feature films and music programs. The music channel signal "Tell Me My Le White Cloud" was recorded specifically by Theodosius Spasov. TV Bulgaria has had very successful productions - "Ambassadors of Bulgaria" and "One Flew Over the night."

On 2 May 2005, the channel unveiled a new identity, keeping the music by Theodosius Spasov, but adopting a new logo. During the first five weeks upon its introduction, eight new original programs were added.

On 14 September 2008, the channel name was changed to BNT SAT. On 20 December 2010, the channel was rebranded to BNT World.On 10 September 2018, the channel was further rebranded to BNT 4.

On 3 March 2021, BNT signed an agreement with Makedonski Telekom (of North Macedonia) to carry the channel on its platform. The channel as of 2025 lost its original productions and was simply relaying programs made for BNT 1, BNT 2 and BNT 3, and was only distributed via satellite. In May of that year, Emil Koshlukov requested that, based on these criteria, BNT 4 should be shut down, causing the broadcaster to alleviate its stress on sports rights and saving 1,4 million lev. In April 2026, it announced a plan to include more in-house programs on the Bulgarian diaspora. The resumption of such programming was welcomed by Emil Jakota, Ambassador of Moldova in Sofia.
