= TV+ (Bulgaria) =

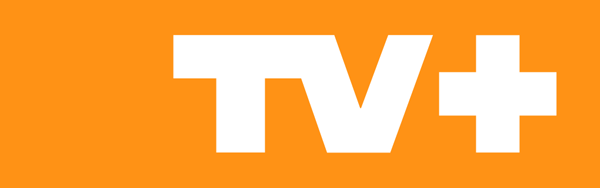
- Type: Private
- Country: Bulgaria
- Headquarters: Sofia, Bulgaria

Programming
- Language: Bulgarian
- Picture format: 1080i HDTV (downscaled to 16:9 576i for the SDTV feed)

Ownership
- Owner: Rozenfeld and KO AD
- Sister channels: F+, Sport+

History
- Launched: 31 October 2008
- Closed: 23 December 2022
- Former names: Bulsatcom Infochannel (2005–2008)

Links
- Website: www.tvplus.bg

Availability

Streaming media
- TV+: Watch live

TV+ was a Bulgarian satellite television channel. The channel is owned by Rosenfeld & Co. AD., part of the Polaris Media network. Initially launched as an information channel in 2005, the channel was transformed as a polythematic on 31 October 2008, when it adopted its current name.

TV+ is part of a media group of channels, whose portfolio also includes the channels F+, Film+, Sport+, Action+, Comedy+, Cinema+, as well as the entertainment channels Close TV and Come to the Kitchen.

For a short time in April 2021, TV+ stopped broadcasting news and its own productions due to the fact that the media did not receive payments for its content from Rosenfeld & Co. AD., the company that owns the television, which is also a subsidiary of the Bulsatcom.

In the Bulsatcom network, channel stopped broadcasting on 1 August 2021, and the company plans to launch its own journalistic channel in its place from 1 September 2021. TV+ continues to broadcast only online. But now from December 23, 2022, the channel suspended online and from Polaris and A1 (from 1 august 2021, because the polaris media owner is connected to Bulsatcom platform and the channel was connected to the owner Plamen Genchev and A1 was connected to bulsatcom) platform.

== Sport ==
The channels in the TV + group air entertainment programs, news bulletins, TV series and films, and along with its sister channels "F+" and "Sport+" also broadcasts sports events like Spanish La Liga, Dutch Eredivisie, ATP World Masters, boxing, WTA, MotoGP, Formula 1, NHL, and NBA. From October 2010 to 2015, the group's channels broadcast the American NBA basketball championship on the Bulgarian air after a break of nearly a year.

== Coverage ==
TV + is broadcast only online. From 1 January 2019 the broadcasting on Vivacom was suspended, and from 1 August 2021, the broadcasting in the Bulsatcom network was also suspended.
