= TV1 (Tanzanian TV channel) =

TV1 is a Tanzanian television channel owned by Modern Times Group (MTG). They broadcast in Swahili language a mix of news, entertainment programs and purchased movies and TV shows. The channel is aimed at the 15–49 age group and has a particular focus on female viewers.

== History ==
The channel was launched on 10 January 2014 becoming Tanzania's first advertising-funded television channel.
