= Vivacom =

Bulgarian telecommunications company

- Native name: Виваком
- Formerly: Vivatel/BTC
- Type: Subsidiary
- Industry: Telecommunications
- Founded: December 1992; 33 years ago
- Headquarters: Sofia, Bulgaria
- Key people: Asen Velikov (CEO)
- Products: Satellite television; IPTV; Fixed line; Mobile telephony; Internet service provider
- Revenue: 494,000,000 (2018)
- Net income: 19 billion leva (2016)
- Number of employees: 5,905
- Parent: United Group
- Website: www.vivacom.bg

Vivacom (Bulgarian: Виваком) is a Bulgarian telecommunications company. It is the largest telecommunications company in Bulgaria by both revenue and market share, being a former state-owned operator. The company is headquartered in the capital city Sofia and employs around 5,900 people, owning a mature distribution network with around 230 branded retail outlets and alternative sale points.

Vivacom is a fully integrated operator, providing mobile, fixed voice, fixed broadband and pay-TV (both DTH and IPTV) services on a nationwide scale to both residential and business customers. The fixed-line services are provided through copper-based and fibre network footprint, while the mobile services are based on GSM/GPRS/EDGE and UMTS/HSPA+/LTE technologies.

== History ==
BTC has its roots as the incumbent fixed-line operator organizing and facilitating communications services in Bulgaria.

Following the end of World War II and the establishment of the People's Republic of Bulgaria the Ministry of Railways, Posts and Telegraphs of Bulgaria was dissolved and divided into two organizations: Ministry of Railways, Roads and Water Communications and Ministry of Posts, Telegraph and Telephone which operated the postal system. From 1957 the Ministry of Post was merged back into the Ministry of Transport and Communications and the telecommunication department was under its jurisdiction. In 1981 the postal department and telecommunications department were united to form a state-owned company, the Bulgarian Post and Telecommunications (Bulgarian: Български пощи и далекосъобщения. In 1992 following the demise of the communist regime and the establishment of modern Bulgaria, the regulatory part was given to the newly created Committee for Post and Telecommunications, and the company itself split into two separate entities: the Bulgarian Telecommunications Company (Bulgarian: Българската телекомуникационна компания), with the post being incorporated as a separate company.

The company has gone through various stages of operation – from the long period of state-owned structure to the privatization procedure in 2004, when the Bulgarian government sold 65% of the share capital.

In May 2005 the BTC was granted a license for the development of third-generation mobile telecommunication systems under the UMTS standard. In November 2005 the company launched its mobile services under the “Vivatel” brand. Vivatel became Bulgaria's fastest growing mobile operator following its launch.

In January 2009, BTC announced the merger with its subsidiary BTC Mobile (Vivatel).

In September 2009, BTC and Vivatel united into a new brand - Vivacom. Nowadays, Vivacom is the operator that offers the widest range of telecommunication solutions on the Bulgarian market.

In late 2012, VTB Capital, the investment arm of Russia's second-largest bank, led a consortium (Viva Telecom Bulgaria EAD) to buy a controlling stake in BTC. The consortium included a local partner, Tzvetan Vassilev. In November 2012, Viva Telecom Bulgaria EAD acquired a 93.99 percent stake in the Bulgarian Telecommunications Company. The transaction became a fact as a result of the approval of a comprehensive scheme for the sale and restructuring of the company. The deal received approval from the European Commission and other regulatory authorities. Local experts state that the purchase of VIVACOM was among the most complicated deals in Bulgaria.

In 2015, the Belgian investor Pierre Louvrier made the acquisition of the Vivacom group via his Luxembourg holding company LIC33 for nearly 900 million euros. The acquisition was finally canceled by the Belgian investor in July 2015 following numerous embezzlements discovered by him, during the takeover of the Bulgarian group.

On 7 November 2019, it was announced that United Group, the leading telecoms, and media business operating in South-Eastern Europe, had agreed to acquire Viva Telecom Bulgaria. The deal was finalized on 31 July 2020 when the shares in Viva Telecom Bulgaria were acquired by United Group Bulgaria EOOD.

As of 30 September 2022, after 30 years of using the BTC name, the entity got rebranded from Bulgarian Telecommunication Company EAD to Vivacom Bulgaria EAD.

== Operations ==
=== Mobile service ===
As of December 31, 2019, Vivacom is the third largest mobile operator in Bulgaria, based on the number of subscribers. The company's mobile service revenue market share is approximately 30% for the year ended December 31, 2019.

As the end of 2019, Vivacom's mobile network has the following coverage of the Bulgarian population:

- 2G (GSM/GRPS/EDGE) - 99.99%
- 3G (UMTS/HSPA+) - 99.98%
- 4G (LTE) - 99.94%
- 5G network - VIVACOM launched the first Bulgaria 5G network in all 27 district centers of the country in September 2020.

=== Fixed-line services ===
Vivacom is the incumbent in the fixed voice market with 81% revenue share as at June 30, 2019. As of December 31, 2019 Vivacom is the largest fixed broadband operator with 27% subscriber market share. As of the end of 2019, Vivacom is positioned as the third largest pay-TV provider and the largest IPTV operator.

=== Television services ===
On 1 March 2012 the TV channel of the company Vivacom Arena was launched. It is broadcast as a paid package in the operator's satellite and IPTV network. It broadcasts films, and in the first year of its broadcast, it also broadcast live tennis tournaments from the ATP World Tour 250 series.

== Supervisory board ==
- Stan Miller - Member of the Supervisory Board
- Libor Vončina - Member of the Supervisory Board
- Nikos Stathopoulos - Member of the Supervisory Board
- Stelios Elia - Member of the Supervisory Board

== Management board ==
- Nikolay Andreev - Member of the Managing Board, Chief Executive Officer
- Nikolay Gavrilov - Member of the Managing Board, Chief Technical Officer
- Stoyan Karanlakov - Member of the Managing Board, Chief Commercial Officer
- Asen Velikov - Member of the Managing Board, Chief Financial Officer

== See also ==
- List of mobile network operators in Europe
