= Nova (Bulgarian TV channel) =

Bulgarian television station

- Logo used since 2026
- Country: Bulgaria
- Broadcast area: Bulgaria
- Headquarters: Sofia, Bulgaria

Programming
- Language: Bulgarian
- Picture format: 16:9 1080i HDTV (downscaled to 16:9 576i for the SDTV version)

Ownership
- Owner: United Group
- Parent: Nova Broadcasting Group
- Sister channels: Kino Nova; Nova News; Nova Sport; Diema; Diema Family; Diema Sport; Diema Sport 2; Diema Sport 3; The Voice; Magic TV

History
- Launched: 16 July 1994

Links
- Website: nova.bg

Availability

Terrestrial
- MUX2: Channel 3

Nova, stylized as NOVA and previously marketed as NTV or Nova Television, is a Bulgarian free-to-air television network launched on 16 July 1994. Nova TV, alongside the channels Kino Nova, Nova News, Nova Sport, DIEMA, Diema Family and Diema Sport are part of Nova Broadcasting Group and owned by United Group.

Nova Television received a television license to broadcast as a terrestrial network on 18 July 2003, thus becoming the third free-to-air television station in Bulgaria, after Channel 1 and bTV, and the second private national media.

On 31 July 2008, Swedish media conglomerate Modern Times Group bought Nova TV from Antenna Group for €620 million. The deal was completed on 16 October 2008.

On 22 March 2019, Advance Media Group bought Nova TV from Modern Times Group for €185 million. On 24 December 2020, it was announced that United Group would buy Nova Broadcasting Group; the acquisition was completed on 22 January 2021.

On New Year’s Day at midnight, NOVA introduced a new logo and brand identity (alongside NOVA News and Kino NOVA) with the slogan of “We are here together (Тук сме заедно)”.

== Programming ==
Nova airs Endemol productions: Big Brother (see Big Brother Bulgaria), Star Academy (see Star Academy Bulgaria), Deal or No Deal, 1 vs. 50, as well as Who Wants to Be a Millionaire? under the name Стани богат (Become Rich). Popular American TV series such as Law & Order, House, Lost, CSI and CSI: Miami, Leverage, Castle, The Closer, Cold Case, Without a Trace, Sex and the City, Nip/Tuck, The Dead Zone, Star Trek: Enterprise, Prison Break, Ugly Betty, Heroes and Terminator: The Sarah Connor Chronicles are also part of Nova Television's programme.

Nova also aired "Gospodari na Efira", a Bulgarian licensed version of "Striscia la notizia", the most viewed TV program in Italy, but the show's producers at "Global vision" decided to move it to another big TV network in Bulgaria - bTV. Later in spring 2012 due to a major scandal involving bTV Media Group and Global Vision, "Gospodari na efira" returned to Nova. "Complete Madness" was also part of Nova TV's program schedule, but since it is produced by "Global vision", the show has also been moved to bTV. Nova TV aired two dance reality shows in two consecutive years - "VIP Dance" (launched on 8 September 2009) and the charity dance competition "Bailando: Scene of Dreams" in Fall 2010. The outrageous "The Moment of Truth" - BG edition was part of Nova TV's 2009 Fall program schedule as well.

Nova TV's Fall 2011 projects include the hit talent show "X Factor" which starts in September. SevenOne International's show formats - "Beat Your Host" (hosts will be Ivan and Andrey) and "Rent a Host" (hosted by Niki Kuntchev) will air this fall on "Nova", too. Apart from the reality formats, Nova TV will also broadcast it's brand new BG series - "Floor Property" ("Etajna sobstvenost") and the document series "Lost in Bulgaria". "Station Nova" will remain the channel's longest-running show (in terms of broadcasting hours) - every Sunday from 9:00 am until 5.45 pm. Fans of the Bulgarian version of "I Love My Country" will also have the opportunity to watch their favorite game show on Fridays.

Nova also has a children's block on Saturdays and Sundays from 8:00 to 10:00 EET. On 10 December 2006, the Sunday block started to show two Warner Bros. cartoon series from 9:00 to 10:00 in The Warner Block (the name is not translated to Bulgarian at the start of the block, but in ads, it is known as "Часът на Уорнър", or The Warner Hour). The first two shows to air in it are Tom & Jerry Kids and Superman: The Animated Series (the latter is broadcast for the first time in Bulgaria). In the late 1990s the channel showed the first season of Spider-Man (later to be taken over by bTV) and cartoon series such as My Little Pony. Other cartoons include Pokémon, Teenage Mutant Ninja Turtles, Winx Club, Justice League, Samurai Jack, Teen Titans, X-Men: Evolution, Firehouse Tales and Voltron: The Third Dimension (although the original series aired on Kanal 1), Beast Wars (which aired years earlier on Kanal 1 with different dub), The Spectacular Spider-Man, The Life and Times of Juniper Lee, New Captain Scarlet and Transformers: Animated (only the third season). Currently the animated series that are being run are The Woody Woodpecker Show, The Little Mermaid, The Penguins of Madagascar and Gormiti.

On 12 September 2011, Nova changed its broadcast graphics design, and logo and renamed its newscast from "Kalendar" to "Nova's News". Until 6 September 2014 Nova showed all its content in 4:3, except for some movies which were shown in Letterbox, now it is all shown in 16:9; it also did the same in 2017.

On 1 January 2026, Nova changed its broadcast graphics design, and logo.

=== Reality/Unscripted ===
- Big Brother - reality show (2004–2018, 2024–2025)
  - VIP Brother
  - Big Brother All Stars
  - Big Brother Family
- X Factor Bulgaria - music show (2011–2017)
- Your Face Sounds Familiar - franchise show (2013–present)
- Na Kafe - talk show (2000–2005, 2009–present)
- Who Wants to Be a Millionaire? - game show (2001–2014)
- Family Feud - game show (2002–2005, 2016–present)
- Deal or No Deal - game show (2005–2018, 2023–present)
- The Floor - game show (2026–present)
- The cherry of the cake (Bulgarian version of Come Dine With Me) - cooking reality (2011–present)
- Wheel of Fortune - game show (2010)
- Peesh ili luzhesh (Bulgarian version of I Can See Your Voice) (2016, 2024–present)
- Bake Off - cooking reality (2016)
- Kitchen Nightmares - cooking reality (2014–2022, 2026–present)
- Hell's Kitchen Bulgaria - cooking reality (2018–present)
- Desafío - adventure reality (2019–present)
- The Masked Singer - franchise show (2019–2021)
- Power Couple - reality show (2020–2025)
- The stars in us (Bulgarian version of Starstruck) - music show (2022)
- The great chase (Bulgarian version of The Chase) - game show (2022–2023)
- Undercover boss - reality show (2016–2020, 2024-present)
- identity - reality show (2024)

=== Serials ===
- Hotel Bulgaria (Хотел България) (2004–2005) - 250 episodes.
- Morska sol (Морска сол) (in English: Sea salt) (2004–2005) - 35 episodes.
- Zabranena Lyubov (Забранена любов) (in English: Forbidden Love) (2008–2011) - 299 episodes.
- Etazhna sobstvenost (Етажна собственост) (in English: Condominium) (2011–2013) - 48 episodes comedy about the life in a block of flats and the neighbors.
- Otplata (Отплата) (in English: Return) (2012) - 12 episodes
- Zheneni s deca v Bulgaria (Женени с деца в България) (in English: Married... with Children in Bulgaria) - remake of the original Married... with Children (2012) - 16 episodes.
- Otkradnat zhivot (Откраднат живот) (in English: Stolen life) (2016–2021) - 506 episodes
- Nie, nashite i vashite (Ние, нашите и вашите) (in English: Us, ours and yours) (2017) - 24 episodes
- Politsaite ot kraya na grada (Полицаите от края на града) (in English: Policemen from the end of the city) (2018) - 25 episodes
- Dyavolskoto gurlo/Esenta na demona (Дяволското гърло/Есента на демона) in English: The Devil's Throat (named after a cave in Bulgaria)/Autumn of the demon (2019, 2024)
- Gospodin X i moreto (Господин X и морето) (in English: Mr. X and the sea) (2019) - 12 episodes
- Putyat na chestta (Пътят на честта) (in English: The road of honor) (2019, 2021) - 92 episodes
- All Inclusive (2020–present)
- Yagodova luna (Ягодова луна) (in English: Strawberry moon) (2020) - 12 episodes
- Bratia (Братя) (in English: Brothers) (2020–2022)
- Otdel Izdirvane (Отдел Издирване) (in English: Search Department) (2021) - 13 episodes
- Lazhite v nas (Лъжите в нас) (in English: The lies in us) (2022) - 52 episodes
- S reka na sartseto (С река на сърцето) (in English: With a river of heart) (2022) - 42 episodes
- Monogo moy chovek (Много мой човек) (in English: Very much my man) (2023) - 12 episodes
- Aleya na slavata (Алея на славата) (in English: Walk of fame) (2023) - 39 episodes
- Kletkata (Клетката) (in English: The cell) (2023) - 12 episodes
