= Bulsatcom =

Bulgarian satellite television, internet and mobile operator

- Native name: Булсатком
- Industry: Telecommunications
- Founded: 2000; 26 years ago
- Defunct: 2024; 2 years ago
- Fate: Acquired by United Group and dissolved
- Headquarters: Sofia, Bulgaria
- Key people: Petar Rizov, CEO
- Products: Satellite television; Internet services
- Revenue: 155 million leva
- Net income: −21,166,000 Bulgarian lev (2021)
- Total assets: 257,717,000 Bulgarian lev (2021)
- Owner: United Group; (2024–present)
- Number of employees: 1800
- Website: www.bulsatcom.bg

Bulsatcom is a Bulgarian satellite television, internet & mobile operator. Founded in 2000 as the largest DVB-S operator in the country, the company is operated from Sofia and Stara Zagora.

Six years after entering the internet service provisioning market, it also began providing 4G LTE mobile data services from 2015 onwards. Currently the largest number of pay TV subscribers in Bulgaria, the firm has added in early 2015 IPTV services to its product portfolio.

In March 2024, it was announced that it was acquired by United Group, a pay TV and telecommunications operator in Southeast Europe.

== Services ==
- Fixed telephony
- DVB-S
- IPTV
- Broadband Internet
