= United Group =

Southeastern European telecom and mass media company

United Group B.V.
- Type: Private
- Industry: Mass media Advertising; Telecommunications; Cable television
- Founded: 2007; 19 years ago
- Founder: Dragan Šolak
- Headquarters: Spicalaan 41, 2132 JG Hoofddorp, Netherlands
- Area served: Serbia; Bosnia and Herzegovina; Montenegro; Slovenia; North Macedonia; Croatia; Bulgaria; Greece
- Key people: Stan Miller (Chief executive officer); Libor Vončina (deputy CEO)
- Brands: Telemach BH; Telemach Croatia; Telemach Montenegro; Telemach Slovenia; CAS Media Serbia; CAS Media Slovenia; Vivacom; Nova
- Owners: BC Partners (majority); KKR (minority)
- Website: united.group

United Group B.V. is a multinational telecommunications and media conglomerate, based in Hoofddorp, Netherlands, that operates across Southeast Europe.

== History ==
United Group was formed in 2007, as a Luxembourg-registered multinational entity, in a merger of Serbia Broadband (SBB) and two companies named Telemach, one in Slovenia and the other in Bosnia and Herzegovina. Telemach Montenegro became a part of United Group in 2014. Telemach acquired Tušmobil on 1 April 2015. This being a cable acquisition of a mobile network makes it a unique case in the region, and the first step of United Group into providing all telecommunication services (landline, mobile, television, and internet) in one household.

United Group is the largest alternative pay television platform in parts of former Yugoslavia, providing television, internet, landline and mobile telephony providers to both households and businesses.

In 2013, the group started its worldwide OTT platform, NetTV Plus, through which it provides Pay TV and landline telephony services to the former Yugoslav diaspora. As the group’s distribution platforms developed extensively throughout the region, the next step was entering the content and advertising sales business, today represented by United Media.

In March 2014, United Group was bought by Kohlberg Kravis Roberts, a leading global investment firm with headquarters in New York, and U.S. 94.3 billion in assets under management. The European Bank for Reconstruction and Development (EBRD) is a co-investor in the company.

In September 2018, a British private equity firm BC Partners began the process of acquisition of the majority stakes of United Group from KKR for an enterprise valuation of 2.6 billion euros. The acquisition was finalized on 4 March 2019.

On 24 December 2020, United Group announced they would buy Bulgaria's Nova Broadcasting Group; the acquisition was completed on 22 January 2021.

In late 2024, United Group's Serbian news outlets drew increased attention during student-led protests and calls for new elections, as they were among the few widely accessible outlets in Serbia where government-critical voices were regularly aired. In early 2025, United Group sold its Serbian telecom assets, including the cable operator SBB, and transferred its sports rights to the state-owned Telekom Srbija while retaining Serbian media brands such as N1 and Nova S.

== Technological development ==
The company was the first to offer digital landline telephony services in 2012. This was also the year United Group launched the first application for watching television and using TV services on different mobile devices.

In 2016, United Group established United Cloud, the in-house technology and software "innovation center".

In September 2017, Eon TV platform was launched, which allows viewers in Serbia to watch TV via a smart TV app. In 2018, United Group launched Eon Smart Box, which was the first regional solution to combine television with Android services and applications.

In 2018, United Group also partnered with Fon Wireless to expand its Wi-Fi network and enable regional customers the access to more than 68 million Wi-Fi hotspots all over the world.

== Telecommunication platforms ==
Today, United Group is the largest alternative pay television platform in the former Yugoslavia region, providing television, Internet, landline, and mobile telephony to a large number of households and offices in the region through its cable, DTH, and OTT platforms.

The company provides services across three key brands:

- Telemach – mobile, landline, Internet, and TV services provider in Bosnia and Herzegovina, Croatia, Montenegro, and Slovenia.
- Nova – Greek mobile, landline, Internet, and TV services provider. It also owns several channels, namely Nova Cinema, Novasports, and Nova Life. These channels are offered only to satellite TV subscribers. The company originated from the merger of Nova and Wind Hellas, which was acquired by United Group in August 2021.
- Vivacom – Bulgarian mobile, landline, Internet, and TV services provider, formerly known as the Bulgarian Telecommunications Company.

== United Media ==
United Media is a combination of top Pay TV channels in the region (sports, movies, kids) and CAS Media providing clients with targeted media buying on most of the regional cable channels. United Media channel offer is available for cable, DTH, OTT, and IPTV distribution. In 2018, United Media announced the acquisition of Direct Media, a regional advertising agency.

United Group's news and current-affairs operations in the former Yugoslavia were reorganized under the Adria News Network (ANN), a structure within the group overseeing a dozen media outlets. Veteran journalist Brent Sadler was appointed Chief News Executive of ANN, with responsibility for overseeing United Group's news outlets across the region. In Serbia, ANN includes the television stations N1 and Nova S, the daily newspaper Danas, and the weekly magazine Radar. In May 2026 the United Group reached an agreement with Alpac Capital to sell Adria News Network.

- Cinemania
- Brainz
- Diema
- Diema Family
- Diema Sport 1
- Diema Sport 2
- Diema Sport 3
- Doma TV
- Fight Channel
- Grand 1
- Grand 2
- IDJ TV
- Kino NOVA
- Magic TV
- Lov i ribolov
- Mini TV
- N1 (BH; CRO; SRB)
- Nova BH
- Nova BUL
- Nova BUL News
- Nova Cinema 1
- Nova Cinema 2
- Nova Cinema 3
- Nova Cinema 4
- Nova CRO
- Nova Life
- Nova M
- Nova Sport BUL
- Nova Sports News
- Nova Sports Prime
- Nova Sports Start
- Nova Sports 1
- Nova Sports 2
- Nova Sports 3
- Nova Sports 4
- Nova Sports 5
- Nova Sports 6
- Nova SRB
- Pikaboo
- Sport Klub 1
- Sport Klub 2
- Sport Klub 3
- Sport Klub 4
- Sport Klub 4K
- Sport Klub 5
- Sport Klub 6
- Sport Klub 7
- Sport Klub 8
- Sport Klub 9
- Sport Klub 10
- Sport Klub Golf
- Sport Klub HD
- The Voice
- Vavoom

== Advertising space ==
CAS Media is the largest agency for the sale of advertising space on cable and satellite channels in the region.

=== Documentaries ===
- Discovery Channel Serbia
- Brainz
- Viasat History
- Viasat Explore

=== General entertainment ===
- Nova SRB
- Grand 1
- TLC
- Investigation Discovery
- E!
- IDJ TV
- HGTV

=== Children ===
- Pikaboo
- Vavoom
- Nickelodeon
- Nick Jr. Channel

=== Films ===
- Cinemania
- AXN
- Cinestar
- Cinestar Action
- Diva TV
- TV1000
- Nova Max
- Nova Series

=== News ===
- N1 (Bosnia and Herzegovina, Croatia, Montenegro, Serbia)

=== Sports ===
- Lov i ribolov

== Legal disputes & criticism ==
When United Group announced its acquisition of Vivacom, the largest Bulgarian telecom, United Group was added to the list of defendants in a lawsuit by Empreno Ventures, which disputes the ownership of Vivacom and the sale of the company.

When Vivacom announced that it would be buying smaller regional companies, it faced backlash from PPF, owner of Yettel Bulgaria, and A1 Bulgaria, since the acquisitions would give them a monopoly in multiple provinces, including Ruse, Silistra, Varna, Razgrad and Sofia. Vivacom denied the claims that it was monopolising the market.

=== Serbia ===
After United Group's deal to divest Serbian telecom assets and transfer sports rights to Telekom Srbija, concerns were raised that United Group's Serbian broadcasters could face increased political pressure or a shift in editorial stance. Telekom Srbija has been portrayed by critics as a central instrument for dominance in Serbia's media market and has invested around €2 billion in sports rights, acquisitions of smaller operators, and the financing of pro-government broadcasters. Pro-government outlets carried on such platforms have been reported to denounce protesting students and other government critics using terms such as "foreign mercenaries", "traitors" and "Nazis", while portraying the protests as a "colour revolution" allegedly controlled by Western actors. After an illegally recorded phone call between the chief executives of United Group and Telekom Srbija was made public in summer 2025, additional concerns were reported about possible influence on United Group's Serbian news outlets. United Group described the recording as taken out of context and stated that editors-in-chief would retain their authority and that no layoffs were planned. The creation of ANN and Sadler's appointment were presented as safeguards intended to prevent undue influence from political actors, shareholders, or group management.

In mid-August 2025, leaked internal communications and photos, published by OCCRP, revealed that Stan Miller, the new CEO of United Group (appointed in June by its majority owner BC Partners), traveled to Belgrade for meetings with Vladimir Lučić, CEO of state-owned Telekom Srbija. These discussions reportedly focused on weakening United Media, particularly N1, one of the last independent broadcasters in Serbia.

Miller reportedly acknowledged that he understood the Serbian President Aleksandar Vučić's dissatisfaction with Subotić not having been dismissed yet but asked for more time, citing the need to implement other prior changes.
