= Bulgarian National Television =

Public television broadcaster

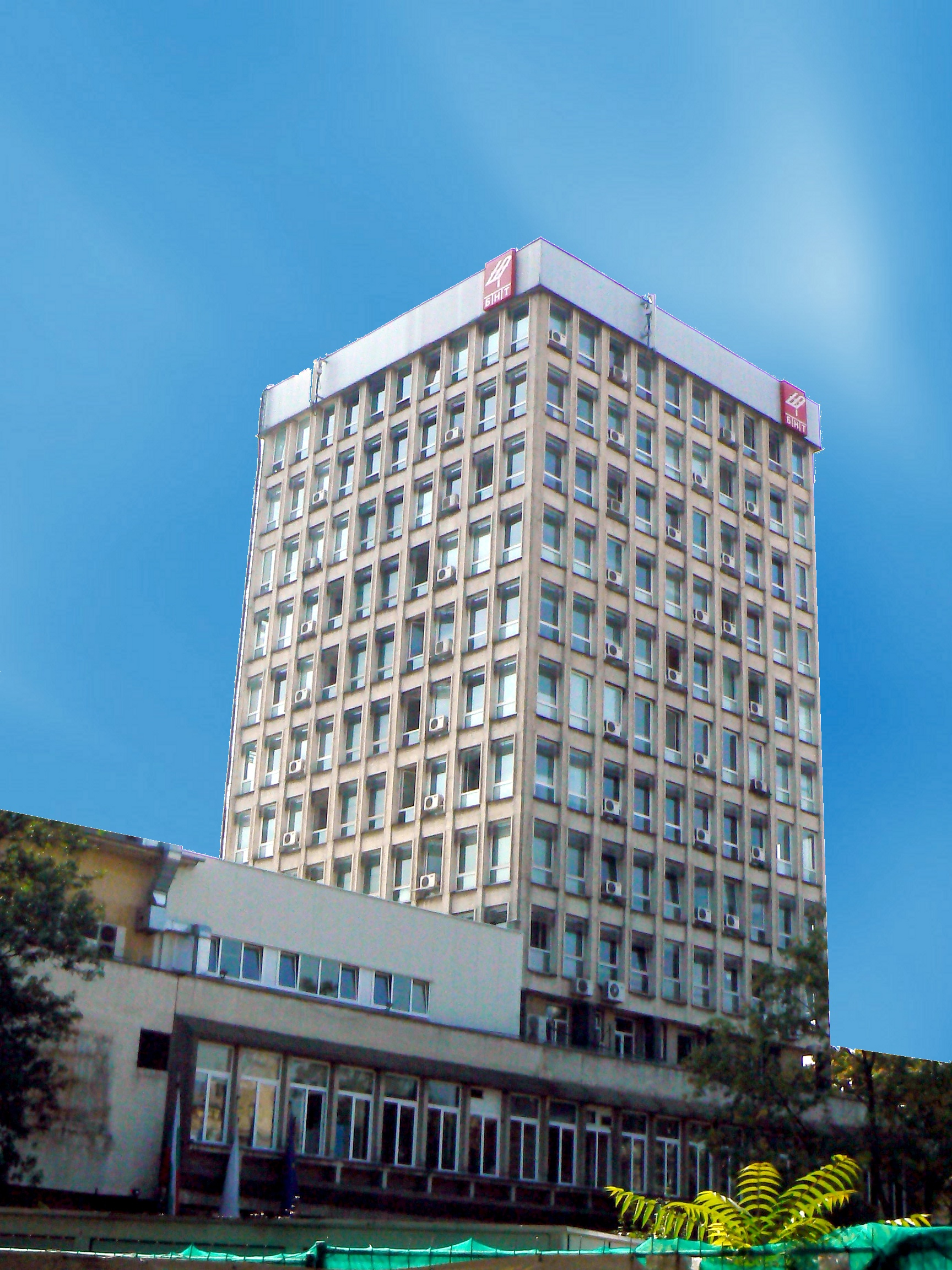
- BNT headquarters in Sofia
- Type: Public broadcasting
- Branding: BNT (English); БНТ (Bulgarian)
- Country: Bulgaria
- Founded: 25 December 1959; 66 years ago
- Headquarters: Ulitsa San Stefano 29, 1504 Sofia
- Broadcast area: Bulgaria and parts of its bordering countries
- Owner: Republic of Bulgaria as a statutory corporation
- Key people: Milena Milotinova (General Director)
- Former names: BT (1959–1992)
- Picture format: 576i (SDTV) 16:9; 1080i (HDTV) 16:9
- Official website: www.bnt.bg
- Language: Bulgarian

Bulgarian National Television (BNT; Bulgarian: Българска национална телевизия, romanized: Bŭlgarska natsionalna televiziya), stylized as ·Б·Н·Т· since 2018, is the national public broadcaster of Bulgaria. BNT was founded in 1959 and started broadcasting on December 26 of the same year. It was the first television service to be broadcast in Bulgaria.

BNT carries out its activities under the Radio and Television Act of 1998, promulgated in issue 138 of 1998 of the State Gazette. BNT is a legal entity with its registered office in the city of Sofia. It is a national public television and telecommunications operator.

BNT was a member of the International Radio and Television Organisation (OIRT) until 31 December 1992, and the European Broadcasting Union (EBU) from 1 January 1993. It is also a member of the International Music and Media Centre (IMZ), CIRCOM and the International Federation of Television Archives (FIAT/IFTA).

== History ==
The first broadcast of BNT was the live broadcast of the November 7 demonstration from September 9 Square (today Prince Alexander I Square) in 1959. On December 26, 1959, the official opening of Bulgarian Television took place. The archive had recorders, photos and movies which were open to the public from the end of the 1950s and the beginning of the 1960s. In 1964, the General Directorate of Bulgarian Television and Radio was established within the Ministry of Culture. From 1964, BNT began broadcasting news, programmes and movies in monochrome to serve the rising number of viewers in Bulgaria.

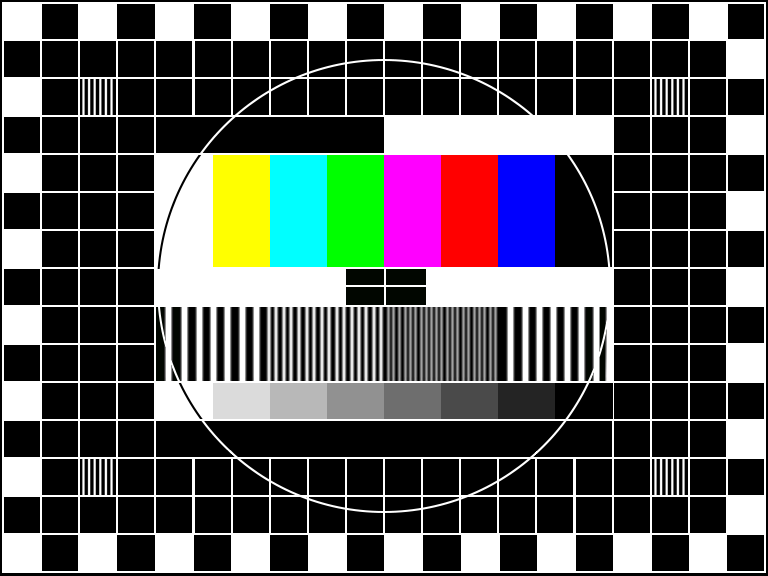
Colour test card used by BNT from the early-1970s until the 1990s.

BNT began broadcasting in colour in 1973 using the French SECAM colour system after series of experimental broadcasting since 1969. The second channel, BT2, saw its emergence the following year.

From 1975, the first video recordings using the 2-inch format were made. In 1977, a broadcasting and program archive was created. In 1983, recorders with one-inch tape were made. The end of the 2-inch era was in 1984.

On March 6, 1990, the National Assembly adopted a decision on the temporary status of the Bulgarian Television and the Bulgarian Radio, according to which the two organizations were established as independent institutions. From June 1, 1992, the television was named Bulgarian National Television, the First Program was now called "Channel 1", and the Second Program - "Efir 2". In 1993, the Regional TV Centers of BNT began broadcasting their own regional channels. "Efir 2" broadcast until May 31, 2000, and from May 2, 1999, BNT broadcasts the satellite program for Bulgarians abroad "TV Bulgaria".

The year 1992 was very important for Bulgarian National Television. All records started to be recorded on computer and digitized for better quality, and available in a variety of other formats, and it switched from SECAM to the more widely used PAL. BT1 and BT2, were renamed as "Kanal 1" and "Efir 2", respectively. In the aforementioned year, an archive was created with more than 2,000 photos and 33,000 documents. Later, in 1999, TV Bulgaria (now BNT 4), BNT's satellite channel, was established.

The 2010 FIFA World Cup became the first sports event broadcast in HD format. Since March 2012, BNT has been broadcasting in 16:9 format. On 6 February 2014, BNT started broadcasting its own HD channel – BNT HD (which was renamed in 2018 to BNT 3)

BNT is set to host the Eurovision Song Contest 2027 in Burgas following Dara winning the previous year's contest for Bulgaria with the song "Bangaranga".

== Channels ==
The Bulgarian National Television broadcasts on four different themed channels:

- BNT 1 – a 24-hour general channel with national significance
- BNT 2 – cultural-based channel that offers a variety of programmes covering all aspects of day-to-day life of the Bulgarian people, culture, arts, sports, entertainment, films, series and regional programming
- BNT 3 – sport-based channel
- BNT 4 – broadcasts internationally and provides cultural and informative content produced in Bulgaria

Outside of Bulgaria, only BNT 4 is available to watch over the internet. BNT 1, BNT 2 and BNT 3 channels are watched over the internet only in Bulgaria due to their broadcasting rights. Attempting to watch BNT 1, BNT 2 and BNT 3 channels outside of Bulgaria, the test card on the website will result in the English text "This broadcast is limited only for the territory of Bulgaria.".

BNT operates four regional broadcasting centers, based in Blagoevgrad, Varna, Plovdiv and Ruse.

== Mission, values and goals ==
BNT operates in accordance with the Radio and Television Act. Under the Act, BNT is a legal entity based in Sofia and it is the national public service broadcaster and communications operator. As a public service broadcaster, the main purpose of BNT is to deliver a broad range of news and programming that keeps its audience informed about important issues and events in the areas of politics, economics, business, culture, science and education. Through its programming policy, BNT protects national interests and values, science and education; and represents the cultural heritage of all Bulgarian citizens, irrespective of their ethnicity. BNT caters for the diverse ideas and beliefs within society by reflecting the many different points of view and encouraging mutual understanding and tolerance in the relations between people. BNT has the commitment to produce a broad spectrum of national and regional programmes including ones about other countries, societies and cultures around the world; programmes that meet the needs of Bulgarian citizens whose mother-tongue is not Bulgarian, by the inclusion of original content in their own language; and programmes that keep Bulgarians living abroad up-to date with events in their home country.

== Logos ==
First BNT standalone logo used 1959–2008

Previous BNT logo from 2008 to 2018

Current BNT logo (2018-)

== Extra ==
In 2026, BNT was the winning broadcaster for the 70th Eurovision Song Contest. They are hosting the 71st contest in Burgas. They have been the first broadcaster in over 10 years to win for the first time.

== See also ==
- Daniela Kaneva
- Bulgarian National Radio
