= The Voice (Bulgaria) =

The Voice TV Bulgaria
- Country: Bulgaria
- Broadcast area: Satellite coverage over the EMEA region
- Headquarters: Sofia, Bulgaria

Ownership
- Owner: A.E. Best Success Services Bulgaria EOOD (2011-2022); United Group (2022-Present)
- Sister channels: The Voice (radio station)

History
- Launched: 16 November 2003 (as Veselina TV); 10 November 2006 (as The Voice); 2 April 2007 (radio)
- Former names: Veselina TV (2003-2006)

Links
- Website: thevoice.bg

Availability

Streaming media
- BSS Media Group: ✓

The Voice TV Bulgaria (usually known as simply The Voice) is a Bulgarian music channel. The Voice is a modern music media with its original format offering its audience a rich selection of contemporary hit music. The selection of music, shows, and campaigns has been scheduled in line with the viewers’ preferences, shaping The Voice's distinct and easily recognizable music channel on the market.

The media was established in 2006 and since then it grew into one of the most preferred TV music channels among young people in bigger cities in Bulgaria.

Established as a hip hop and RnB oriented media nowadays the media plays primarily pop, dance, rnb and trap music and it not only follows the global music tendencies, but also imposes music trends on the Bulgarian market.

The channel was formerly known as Veselina TV (named after Radio Veselina). In 2006, the SBS Broadcasting Group acquired Radio Veselina, and in October 2006, Veselina TV was rebranded as The Voice TV, after the music channels in the Nordic countries.

On November 10, 2011, ProSiebenSat.1 Group sold all its Bulgarian radio stations and the music channel, The Voice TV, to A.E. Best Success Services Bulgaria EOOD. The success of the Voice TV relies on a variety of shows, the main emphasis of which are the BG Voice Top10, TV Airplay Chart Top30 and the column The Voice Backstage, in which exclusive interviews with some of the most beloved Bulgarian and international artists are shown to the audience.

== Logotypes ==
Veselina TV logo used 2003-2006

== Frequencies ==
1.Sofia 96.2 MHz

2. Plovdiv 106.0 MHz

3. Kardjali 107.5 MHz

4. Karnobat 93.3 MHz

5. Smoljan 88.2 MHz

6. Pomorie 98.7 MHz

== TV Programmes ==
=== Current Programming ===
- We Love Music (2006-)
- Snooza (2006-)
- NEW4U (2006-2008, 2011-)
- Deja Voice (2006-)
- 1 artist, 3 hits (2006-)
- Voice Choice (2006-)
- BG Voice Top 10 (2019-)
- The Voice Top 100 (2006-)
- The Voice Kiss: The Biggest Hits (2018-)
- The Voice Party (2006-)
- The Voice Wishlist (2010-)
- The Voice of Summer (2009-)
- The Voice of Winter (2012-)
- The Voice Weekend (2018-)
- The Voice Backstage (2022-)
- TV Airplay Chart Top 30 (2008-)
- Dance Chart (2016-)

=== Former Programming ===
- Zoom News (2006-2021)
- CloseUp (2011-2019)
- Your Voice (2006-2020)
- HipHop & RnB (2006-2022)
- Planet Voice (2006-2022)
- NEW 4 YOU (2008-2011)
- The Voice Sundown (2011-2021)
- The Voice Top 10 (2006-2022)
- In The Mix (2006-2016)
