= List of Macedonian television series =

This is an incomplete list of Macedonian television series.

== B ==
- Beloto ciganche (1983)
- Bulki kraj Shinite (1981)
- Busava azbuka (1985)

== D ==
- Dajte muzika (1993)
- Dzish
- Dnevna Soba

== E ==
- Eden na Eden (2008) Talk show
- Ednooki (2006)

== G ==
- Golemiot Brat (2009) Reality
- Golemi i mali (2000)

== J ==
- Jadi Burek Talk

== K ==
- K-15 (1994) Comedy
- Koj saka da bode Milioner? (2004) Quiz
- Ku Manijia Comedy
- KOD so Snezana Lupevska Talk

== M ==
- Makedonski Narodni Prikazni
- Makedonski Narodni Prikazni 2 (1992)
- Makedonski Narodni Prikazni 3 (2010)
- Macedonian Idol (2010) Talent
- Milenko Nedelkovski Show Talk

== O ==
- Od denes za utre (2010)

== P ==
- Prespav (2016)

== S ==
- Sharam Baram (1985)
- Salon harmoni (1998)

== T ==
- Tanc so Zvezdite (2013) Talent
- Toa sum Jas Reality
- Trst via Skopje (1987)
- Tvrdokorni (1988)

== V ==
- Vo Centar
- Vo svetot na bajkite (1995)
- Volsebnoto samarche (1972)
- Vtora smena (1988)

== X ==
- X Factor Adria (2013) Talent, Reality
