= Mirka Velinovska =

- Born: Мирка Велиновска; April 23, 1952 (age 74); Skopje, SFR Yugoslavia
- Occupation: Journalist
- Years active: 1980–present

Mirka Velinovska-Klasnata is a Macedonian journalist.

== Biography ==
Velinovska was born in Skopje on 23 April 1952. Graduated from Faculty of Philosophy - History of Art, studied Oriental Studies in Belgrade and classic English at Cambridge University. Since 1980 Cultural editing the MRT, and the following year in the internal political rubric of "Vecer." In the period 1990/98 was confirmed the commentator as the weekly "Puls". One of the founders of the weekly "Start" in 1999 and the weekly magazine "Zum." She is a freelance journalist in the leading political weekly "Focus", now "Nova Makedonija". Collaborated with Deutsche Welle, "Search for Ground" and the Institute for War and Peace Reporting in London.

== Awards ==
18 June 2016 Decoration for merit in the fight against Fascism awarded by HE Ambassador of the Russian Federation in Macedonia Mr. Oleg Shcherbak

== Television appearances ==
Air Date	Name of Media	Name of Media Show	Subject of Media Show
November 27, 2009	Channel 5	Milenko Nedelkovski Show	Interview
December 11, 2013	Sitel 3	Jadi Burek	Interview
October 1, 2014	Sitel 3	Jadi Burek	Interview
February 1, 2015	MRT 1	Akcent	Interview
February 23, 2015	Radio Slobodna Makedonija	Kvorum	Interview
April 2, 2015	Radio Slobodna Makedonija	Platforma	Interview
April 21, 2015	Sitel	Dnevnik	Interview
December 4, 2015	Sitel 3	Jadi Burek	Interview
December 25, 2015	Channel 5	Milenko Nedelkovski Show	Interview
January 12, 2016	Channel 5	Operation: Nocturne	Interview Part 1
January 19, 2016	Channel 5	Operation: Nocturne	Interview Part 2
May 7, 2016	Channel 5	Vo Centar	Interview
May 20, 2016	Channel 5	Milenko Nedelkovski Show	Interview
May 5, 2021	Infomax	Infomax Youtube Channel	Interview
May 28, 2021	Rodina	Rodina Youtube Channel	Interview
Jan 14, 2022	Rodina	Rodina Youtube Channel	Interview

== See also ==
- Vasko Eftov
