= Vasko Eftov =

Macedonian journalist (born 1967)

- Born: Васко Ефтов; 1 January 1967 (age 59)
- Education: Ss. Cyril and Methodius University in Skopje
- Occupation: Journalist / Director of Alfa TV
- Years active: 1991–present
- Spouse: (m. 2013–present)
- Children: 2

Vasko Eftov (born January 1, 1967) is a freelance journalist from North Macedonia. He is mostly known as the editor and host of the political TV show titled Vo Centar.

== Career ==
Vasko Eftov started working as a journalist for the Macedonian newspaper Vecer. His first TV show was called Revers and it started airing back in 1996. In March 1999, he received an offer from Sitel which he accepted and renamed the show to Vo Centar (English: In Center). The show aired on Kanal 5 and Alfa. The show was aired and later cancelled from Alsat-M on March 23, 2015 from the Chief editor Muhamed Zakiri. It continued to be aired on Kanal 5. In his job so far he has interviewed many Macedonian and foreign public figures, including Kiro Gligorov, Branko Crvenkovski, Ljubčo Georgievski, Srgjan Kerim, Stojan Andov, Vlado Bučkovski, Pande Petrovski, Adem Demaçi, Ljube Boskovski, Ljubomir Frčkoski, Petre Roman, Zhelyu Zhelev, Bojko Borisov, Miroslav Lazanski, Momir Bulatović, Vuk Drašković, Kristijan Golubović, Pieter Feith, Christopher Hill, Jamie Shea, Peter Carington, Alois Mock, Klaus Kinkel, David Owen, Miroslav Lazanski and many others. Since April 23, 2018 he became the Director of Alfa TV.

== Personal life ==
He is married since October 23, 2013.

== Awards ==
In 2000, Eftov won a Golden Ladybug of Popularity in the field of journalism in 2000.

== Media appearances ==
Air Date	Name of Media	Name of Media Show	Subject of Media Show
April 18, 2012	Darik kafe	Darik world news	Interest of destabilization of Macedonia is: Serbia, said Macedonian journalist
February 23, 2015	Alfa	One on One	S06E13
March 10, 2015	Telma	Top Theme	Еlectoral robbery
March 16, 2015	Kanal 5	Dnevnik Plus	Possible outcomes of the political situation
March 19, 2015	MRT 1	Accent	Current Political Situation in the Country
April 27, 2015	Kanal 5	Dnevnik	The result of the referendum is a serious blow to the political opposition
June 11, 2015	Sitel	I love Macedonia	Agenda
October 30, 2015	Sitel	I love Macedonia	Agenda
March 23, 2016	Radio Slobodna Makedonija	NZS so ISM na RSM	NZS so ISM na RSM
May 15, 2016	Sitel	Dnevnik	Interview

== See also ==
- Channel 5
- Mirka Velinovska
