= Vo Centar =

- Во Центар
- Genre: Political show
- Created by: Vasko Eftov
- Opening theme: Theme of Vo Centar
- Country of origin: North Macedonia
- Original language: Macedonian
- No. of episodes: (list of episodes)

Production
- Producer: Vasko Eftov
- Production location: Skopje
- Running time: 50–55 minutes
- Production company: Eftov Produkcija

Original release
- Network: Kanal 5

Vo Centar (Macedonian: Во Центар, 'At the Center') is a television show from North Macedonia hosted by Vasko Eftov. In March 2015 TV station Alsat-M stopped airing the show on its channel. Today the show is airing on Kanal 5 every Monday at 22:00

== Season 2017/2018 ==
On social media Mr. Eftov has announced that the new session of the show will start to air on Alfa Television on 8 October 2017.

== Season 2016/2017 ==
This season was airing on Kanal 5. After the channel decided to audio censure some words and names from the 27th of May 2017's episode, author of the program has decided not to air his show on Kanal 5 anymore.

Season 2016/2017
Number of Episode	Original air date	Name of Episode In Macedonian	Guests
1	October 2, 2016	Interview Интервју	ugoslav Perušić (Secret Agent)
2	October 9, 2016	Interview Интервју	Milan Vidojević (Journalist)
3	October 16, 2016	How CIA is setting marionette governments? Како ЦИА мести марионетски влади?	Svetozar Radišić (Colonel)
4	October 23, 2016	Masons do not change Gruevski? Масоните не го менуваат Груевски?	Dejan Lučić (Conspiracy Theorist), Jovica Ugrinovski (Doctor)
5	October 30, 2016	Who is shooting in Macedonia? Кој пука во Македонија?	Filip Petrovski (Politician), Albert Musliu (Analyst), Katica Kjulavkova (Academician), Stefan Vlahov Micov (Historian)
6	November 6, 2016	Mossad, CIA and KGB are fighting for Dark web Мосад, ЦИА и КГБ се борат за црниот интернет	Aleksandar Mitovski (CIA Analyst), Aristotel Tentov (University Professor)
7	November 13, 2016	Interview Интервју	Mirka Velinovska (Journalist)
8	November 20, 2016	From JNA deserter to Donald Trump's children nanny Од дезертер на ЈНА до дадилка на децата на Доналд Трамп	Milka Milicevic (Nanny)
9	November 27, 2017	Interview Интервју	Vojislav Šešelj (Politician), Bozha Spasic (Detective)
10	December 4, 2016	Assassinations in the Balcan's Атентати на Балканот	Dragan Vučićević (Journalist), Toma Fila (Lawyer), Filip Švarm (Journalist), Boža Spasić (Detective)
10	December 12, 2016	Interview Интервју	Sergej Samsonenko (Businessman)
11	December 25, 2016	NATO danger to the hole world НАТО опасност за целиот свет	Ivan Pernar (Politician)
12	January 8, 2017	Children of Communism Децата на комунизмот	Milomir Marić (Journalist)
13	January 14, 2017	Masons and Mossad agents Vatikan Масони и Мосад против Ватикан	Miroljub Petrovic (Conspiracy Theorist)
14	January 22, 2017	Truth about Melania Trump the First Lady of America Вистината за Мелани Трамп првата дама на Америка	Stane Jerko (Photographer), Bojan Pozhaj (Author), Milka Milicevic (Nanny), Srecko Ocvirk (Mayor)
15	January 29, 2017	Who is agent "Silver"? Кој е агентон Силвер?	Mitko Chavkov (Politician), Musa Ljamarami (Activist)
16	February 5, 2017	MI-6 and CIA scenarios for Macedonia Сценарио на МИ-6 и ЦИА за Македонија	Ivan Miskovic (Mil. General)
17	February 12, 2017	All scenarios for forming new government Сите сценарија за формирање нова влада	Solza Grcheva (Politician), Darko Janevski (Journalist), Osman Kadriu (Professor)
18	February 19, 2017	Interview Интервју	Mirka Velinovska (Journalist)
19	February 26, 2017	Secreate projects for Ilirida. How many Albanians live in Macedonia? Рајните проекти на Илирида. Колку албанци живеат во Македонија?	Zoran Stanković (Doctor), (Professor)
20	March 5, 2017	Platform for division of Macedonia Платформа за поделба на Македонија	Nikola Srbov (Historian), Mirka Velinovska (Journalist), Ivan Stoiljkovic (Politician), Sulejman Rushiti (Analyst)
21	March 12, 2017	Albanians want to destabilize Macedonia? Албанците сакаат да ја дестабилизираат Македонија?	Jugoslav Petrušić (Secret Agent)
22	March 19, 2017	Edi Rama implements platform for Great Albania Еди Рама ја спроведува платформата за Голема Албанија	Tome Batkovski (Security Expert), Todor Petrov (Pres. of WMC)

- This list is not complete.

== Season 2015/2016 ==
This season is airing on Kanal 5

Season 2015/2016
Number of Episode	Original air date	Name of Episode In Macedonian	Guests
1	October 5, 2015	Who wants to divide Macedonia? Кој сака да ја дели Македонија?	Sotir Kostov, Milovoj Markov, Vancho Shehtanski, Jovan Kovachikj, Todor Chepreganov, Ismail Bojda
2	October 12, 2015	Orthodoxy under attack of the refugee crisis!? Православието на удар на бегалската криза!?	Dejan Lučić, Jugoslav Petrušić, Ivan Babanovski, Janko Bachev, Trpe Stojanovski
3	October 19, 2015	Did Tito betrayed the Macedonians? Дали Тито ги предаде Македонците?	Bojan Dimitrievic, Stojan Andov, Stavre Dzikov, Sonja Nikolova
4	October 26, 2015	Kumanovo like new Arachinovo !? Куманово како ново Арачиново !?	Vasil Chilimanov, Fejzi Hajdari, Vlado Pivovarov, Pavle Trajanov
5	November 2, 2015	How much money is needed to topple a government ? Со колку пари се руши една влада ?	Vojislav Šešelj, Jelena Guskova, Sevan Gjurovic, Kostadin Cakarov, Metropolis H.H. Petar, Natalija Ivceva, Ivon Velickovski, Dzabir Derala
6	November 9, 2015	Candy coexistence Бомбона соживот	Petar Kolev, Agim Jonuz, Alajdin Demiri
7	November 16, 2015	How 150 000 citizenship's were given to the Albanians ? Како беа поделени 150 000 државјанства на албанците ?	Jugoslav Petrušić, Goran Mitevski, Solza Grceva, Vladimir Pivovarov, Aleksandar Novakovski, Naser Ziberi
8	November 23, 2015	Are the Albanians below 20% ? Дали албанците се под 20 проценти ?	Slave Risteski, Rubin Zemon, Adnan Kjahil
9	November 30, 2015	Interview: Jugoslav Petrušić; Интервју: Југослав Петрушиќ	Jugoslav Petrušić
10	December 7, 2015	Prostitution in Macedonia; Проституција во Македонија	Ivan Atanasovski, Vasko Spasoski, Marjan Josifovski, Nikola Oprov, Zoran Lazarovski Paljo, Ztala Bojkoska
11	December 14, 2015	Interview: Vojislav Sheshelj and Miroslav Lazanjski; Интервју: Воислав Шешељ и Мирослав Лазањски	Vojislav Šešelj, Miroslav Lazanski
12	December 21, 2015	Interview: Kristijan Golubović and Milomir Marić; Интервју: Кристијан Голубовиќ и Миломир Мариќ	Kristijan Golubović, Milomir Marić
13	December 28, 2015	Will Macedonia implement two Framework Agreements !? Дали Македонија ќе спроведува два рамковни договора !?	Vojislav Šešelj, Jugoslav Petrusić, Marko Lopusina, Miroslav Lazanski, Albert Musliu, Solza Grceva
14	January 4, 2016	CIA and MI-6 formed the Albanian Mafia ? ЦИА и МИ-6 ја формираа албанската мафија ?	Dejan Lučić
15	January 11, 2016	Fake Josip Broz Tito; Лажниот Јосип Броз Тито	Momčilo Jokić, Josip Joška Broz
16	January 18, 2016	Boža Spasić: James Bond of former UDBA; Божа Спасиќ: Џејмс Бонд на поранешна УДБА	Božidar Spasić, Marko Lopušina
17	January 25, 2016	Is ISIL planning terrorist attacks in Macedonia ? Дали ИСИЛ планира терористички напади во Македонија ?	Dževad Galijašević, Milovan Drecun
18	February 1, 2016	War in 2001; Војната во 2001 година	
19	February 8, 2016	War in 2001 (2); Војната во 2001 година 2 дел	
20	February 15, 2016	Ilirida in the Church; Илирида во црквата	Mitropolit g. Agatangel, Todor Petrov, Petar Popovski, Spasen Mihajlovski, Jovan Jovanovski, Liljana Sinadinovska
21	February 22, 2016	Ambassador Baily leader of the Macedonian Position; Амбасадорот Бејли лидер на македонската опозиција	Ilija Aceski, Mersel Bilalli, Taki Fiti, Jovan Kovačić, Ljubcho Georgievski, Branko Gjorgjevski, Mitropolit g. Agatangel
22	February 29, 2016	Political Assassinations; Политички убивства	Metodi Chepreganov, Goran Nakevski, Ljubomir Cuculovski, Rade Slavkovski
23	March 7, 2016	Interview; Интервју	Mirka Velinovska
24	March 14, 2016	Who is afraid of Census? Кој се плаши од попис?	Darko Janevski, Mirka Velinovska, Solza Grcheva, Naser Ziberi, Dejan Lukić, Roza Topuzova Karevska, Isen Saliu, Petar Kolev, Rubin Zemon
25	March 21, 2016	Was Vancho Mijalov cooperating with UDBA? Дали Ванчо Михајлов бил соработник на УДБА?	Ivan Babamovski, Nikola Srbov, Krasimir Karakachanov, Božidar Spasić, Katerina Trajkova Nurdzieva, Natasha Kotlar Trajkova
26	March 28, 2016	Is the Umbrella going to save Verushevski? Дали Чадорот ќе го спаси Верушевски?	Filip Petrovski, Dane Taleski, Albert Musliu
27	April 4, 2016	Interview; Интервју	Slavko Nikic
28	April 11, 2016	Macedonia sitting on Barrel of Gunpowder; Македонија седи на буре барут	Darko Trifunovic
29	April 18, 2016	Jovanka Broz; Јованка Броз	Žarko Jokanović
30	April 25, 2016	Balkan Cancer because of NATO bombs Балкански канцер поради бомбите на НАТО	Slobodan Čikarić, Slavica Jovanović, Sanin Haverić, Zora Zunić, Petar Škrbina, Eržika Antić, Blagoja Markovski, Jelina Đurković, Stevan Đurović, Milovan Drecun
31	May 2, 2016	The last days of Tito; Последните денови на Тито	Predrag Lalević
32	May 9, 2016	Color Revolutions and CIA Media; Обоени револуции и ЦИА медиуми	
33	May 15, 2016	Zemun Clan, Legija and Arkan! Земунски клан, Легија и Аркан	Mile Novaković, Boro Banjac
34	May 23, 2016	How the Masons are destroying Macedonia; Како Масоните ја растураат Македонија	Elena Guskova, sr:Зоран Ненезић (Zoran Nenezić)
35	May 30, 2016	Russia and United States battle for Macedonia!? Русија и Америка во борба за Макеоднија!?	Vuk Drašković, Atif Dudaković, Aleksej Timofejev, Zoran Nenezić, Bojan Dimitrijević, Todor Chepreganov, Stevan Đurović
36	June 6, 2016	Interview; Интервју	Mitko Chavkov
37	June 13, 2016	Vladimir Putin new Emperor of Orthodoxy; Владимир Путин нов император на православието	Stjepan Mesić, Ivo Banac
38	June 20, 2016	How Croatian UDBA formed and financed the KLA; Како Хрватска УДБА ја формираше и финансирашњ УЧК	Domagoj Margetić, Jadranka Kosor, Vesna Škare Ožbolt, Božidar Spasić, Milomir Marić, Berislav Jelinić
39	June 27, 2016	How much foreign money came in to the Color Revolution? Колку странски пари се влезени во шарена револуција?	Zdravko Saveski, Mitko Chavkov
40	July 4, 2016	Who activated the criminals in the protests Кој ги активираше криминалците во протестите?	Miroslav Vujić, Mitko Chavkov, Mile Novaković, Mirka Velinovska
41	July 11, 2016	Does Macedonia expects hot fall? Дали Македонија ја чека жешка есен?	Stefan Vlahov Micov, Sotir Kostov, Goran Nakevski, Darko Janevski, Ljubomir Cuculovski, Miodrag Labović, Miroslav Vujić, Zdravko Saveski, Dragan Vučićevic, Vlade Milchin

- This list in not complete

== Season 2014/2015 ==
This season aired on Alsat-M.

Season 2014/2015
Number of Episode	Original air date	Name of Episode In Macedonian	Guests
1	September 2, 2014	How was Macedonian state born? Како се раѓаше Македонската држава ?	David Owen, Petar Goshev, Vasil Tupurkovski, Jovan Trpenovski, Mirka Velinovska and others
2	September 9, 2014	How Macedonia became an independent country ? Како Македонија стана неависна држава ?	Kiro Gligorov, Pavle Trajanov, Stojan Andov, Ljubčo Georgievski, Blaže Ristovski and others
3	September 16, 2014	Assassination of Kiro Gligorov; Атентатор врз Киро Глигоров	Peter Carington, Alois Mock, Klaus Kinkel, Nicolas Grillakis and others
4	September 23, 2014	War in 2001; Војната во 2001 година	Christopher Hill, Jamie Shea, Vebi Velija, Slobodan Chokrevski, Branislav Ivkovikj and others
5	September 29, 2014	The truth about Arachinovo; Вистината за Арачиново	Pieter Feith, Tito Belichanec, Reshat Ferati, Pande Petrovski and others

- This list is not complete

== Season 2013/2014 ==
This season aired on Alsat-M.

Season 2013/2014
Number of Episode	Air date	Name of Episode In Macedonian	Guests
1	May 13, 2014	Concentration camps for torture and ethnic cleansing Логори за мачења и етнички чистења	Dzafer Derovukj, Gjamil Durakovikj, Dzevat Galajashevukj and others
2	May 20, 2014	Byzantine games in the opposition Византиски игри во опозиција	Dragiša Miletić
3	May 27, 2014	Most contravention political statements Најконтраверзни политички изјави	Vele Mitanovski, Ljupcho Zikov
4	June 3, 2014	Difference between Ljubčo Georgievski and Nikola Gruevski; Разлики меѓу Љубчо Георгиевски и Никола Груевски	Slobodan Bliznakovski, Karolina Asterud Ristova Zoran Ivanov
5	June 10, 2014	HAART Most powerful weapon for climate destruction ХАРП Најмоќно оружје за климатско уништување	Svetozar Radishevikj, Velimir Abranovikj
6	June 17, 2014	The last Big Boss: Kristijan Golubović; Последниот голем "Бос" Кристијан Голубовиќ	Kristijan Golubović

- This list is not complete

== Season 2012/2013 ==
This season aired on Alsat-M

Season 2012/2013
Number of Episode	Air Date	Name of Episode In Macedonian	Guests
1	November 2, 2012	Dzandar Zbira for Nikola Gruevski; Џандар збира за Никола Груевски	Ljubco Georgievski, Tito Petkovski
2	November 9, 2012	Americans gave up on Macedonia; Американците догнаа раце од Македонија	Fyodor Lukyanov, Stevo Pendarovski, Branislav Sinadinovski
3	November 16, 2012	"Children" of Slobodan Milosevic; Децата на Слободан Милошевиќ	Vuk Draskovic, Zoran Zivkovic, Borislav Pelevic
4	November 23, 2012	Interview: Branko Crvenkovski; Интервју: Бранко Црвенковски	Branko Crvenkovski
5	November 30, 2012	Hag convictions for enriched uranium Хашки пресуди на осиромашен ураниум	Momir Bulatovic, Branko Crvenkovski, Andrej Zernovski
6	December 7, 2012	Macedonian salad & Skanderbeg Cognac; Македонска салата и Скендербег коњак	Dejan Stavric, Alajdin Demiri, Vladimir Pivovarov
7	December 14, 2012	Yellow Card for Ahmeti and Gruevski; Жолт картон за Ахмети и Груевски	Zoran Jovanovski, Edmond Ademi, Ljubomir Frčkoski, Arsim Zekoli
8	December 21, 2012	Esad Rahic; Есад Рахиќ	Mersel Biljali, Esad Rahic
9	December 28, 2012	Fight in the Parliament; Тепачка во Парламентот	Jani Makraduli, Goran Misovski, Jove Kekenovski
10	January 11, 2013	All Prime Minister's people Сите луѓе на премиерот	Nikola Mladenov, Filip Petrovski, Esad Rahic, Ida Protuger, Sasho Kokalanov, Marjan Dodevski
11	January 18, 2013	Political Analysis; Политичка анализа	Albert Musliu, Branko Crvenkovski, Ljubčo Georgievski, Gjorgji Spasov, Antonie Milosevski, Jani Makraduli, Esad Rahic
12	January 25, 2013	What is the agreement between Crvenkovski & Gruevski; Што се договарале Црвенковски и Геруевски	Jelena Guskova, Petar Arsovski, Tanja Karakamisheva
13	February 1, 2013	Macedonia between one-party system & election boycott Македонија меѓу едеопартиски систем и бојкот на изборите	Zoran Damjanovski, Viktor Cvetkovski, Nano Ružin, Rufi Osmani

- This list is not complete

== Season 2011/2012 ==
This season aired on Alfa until April 2012. Later on Alsat-M.

Season 2011/2012
Number of Episode	Air date	Name of Episode In Macedonian	Guests
1	December 19, 2011	Battles: Sutjeska & Neretva; Битките на Сутјеска и Неретва	Tvrtko Jakovina, Vladimir Velebit, Cjamil Cero, Gjorgje Vukovikj
2	December 20, 2011	Census; Попис	Željko Sabo, Andrija Mandič, Admir Baltić, Ljubčo Georgievski, Naser Ziberi, Doncho Gerasimovski
3	December 21, 2011	Srbija; Србија	Miroslav Lazanski, Nada Kolundzija, Rasim Ljajić, Dragan Todorovich, Borislav Pelević
3	January 10, 2012	Kiro Gligorov; Киро Глигоров	Compilation of previous interviews
4	January 24, 2012	NASA and Tito; НАСА И Тито	Zhiga Virc, Boshtjan Virc, Jovo Kapicic, Ivan Prsha
5	January 31, 2012	Fans; Навивачи	Ismail Krivca, Roberto Belichanec, Trifun Kostovski, Daniel Dimevski, Samoil Malcheski, Vancho Chifliganec, Blagoja Stefanovski, Siljan Micevski
6	February 7, 2012	Interview: Ljubčo Georgievski; Интервју: Љубчо Георгиевски	Ljubčo Georgievski
7	February 14, 2012	Most interesting/controversial politicians on Balkan; Најитересни/котраверзни политичари на балканот	Peter Bosman, Velimir Ilić, Adem Demaci, Konstantin Vlkov, Marinela Velichkova, Kostadin Chakarov, Bojko Borisov, Zheljko Sabo, Andrija Mandich, Kristina Patrashkova, Jane Janev, Zoran Jankovic
8	February 20, 2012	Interview: Jugoslav Petrusic; Интервју: Југослав Петрушиќ	Jugoslav Petrusic
9	February 27, 2012	Interview 2: Jugoslav Petrusic; Интервју 2: Југослав Петрушиќ	Jugoslav Petrusic
10	March 5, 2012	Macedonia in the hands of foreign secret services Македонија во рацете на странските тајни служби	Petre Roman, Krasimir Karakachanov, Dimitar Popov, Zhelyu Zhelev, Blagoja Grahovac, Nikola Kljusev, Blaže Ristovski, Stojan Andov, Todor Petrov, Mane Jakovlevski, Slavko Mangovski
11	March 12, 2012	Inter ethnic tensions Меѓуетнички тензии	Aleksandar Tijanić, Jugoslav Petrusic, Pavle Trajanov, Kim Mehmeti, Bujar Osmani, Vancho Shehtanski, Ramadan Ramadani
12	April 27, 2012	Kosovo Pot in Macedonia; Косовски лонец во Македонија	Oliver Ivanović, Adem Demaci, Vane Cvetanov, Sonja Kramarska, Edmon Ademi, Gordan Kalajdziev
13	May 4, 2012	Tito predicted the breaking of Yugoslavia; Тито го предвидел распаѓањето на Југославија	Dušan Bilandžić, Chavdar Chervenkov, Filip Gunov, Ljubomir Frčkoski
14	May 11, 2012	Arabic spring in Macedonia; Арапска пролет во Македонија	Aleksandar Tijanić, Stevo Pendarovski, Jasmin Redzepi, Ramadan Ramadani, Kenan Hasipi, Hadzi Jakup Selimovski, Sherif Ajradinovski, Nano Ružin
15	May 18, 2012	Great Albania; Голема Албанија	Risto Nikovski, Vancho Shehtanski, Jove Kekenovski, Kim Mehmeti, Ljubomir Cuculovski
16	May 25, 2012	Queen's Gambit of Branko Crvenkovski; Дамин гамбит на Бранко Црвенковски	Vlado Bučkovski, Andrej Zirinovski, Goran Misovski, Rufi Osmani, Albert Musliu
17	June 1, 2012	Interview: Teuta Arifi; Интервју: Теута Арифи	Teuta Arifi
18	June 8, 2012	Who is the Father of the Macedonian Privatization; Кој е таткото на Македонската приватизација	Ilinka Mitreva, Alajdin Demiri, Pavle Trajanov, Tito Petkovski, Esad Rahic, Miroljub Shukarov
19	June 16, 2012	Macedonian Albanian coalition Македонско албанска коалиција	Denko Malevski, Atanas Kirovski, Lazar Lazarov, Stevche Jakimovski, Ramadan Ramadani, Azem Vlasi
20	June 22, 2012	Does the government planes to forge the Local Elections; Дали владата планира да ги фалсификува локалните избори	Andrej Petrov, Ljubčo Georgievski, Izet Zekiri, Zoran Jovanovski
21	June 29, 2012	Collage; Колаж	Collage of interviews from the last 10 episodes (from Alsat-M only)

- This list is incomplete

== Season 2010/2011 ==
This season was aired on Kanal 5.

Season 2010/2011
Number of Episodes	Air date	Name of Episode In Macedonian	Guests
1	October 22, 2010	Serbian secret services and KLA; Српски тајни служби и ОВК	Talat Dzaferi, Dzevat Ademi, Janko Bachev, Ljube Boshkovski, Zoran Mijaovic, Ljubo Stojadinovic, Slobodan Bogoevski
2	June 3, 2011	Political analysis for the campaign Политичка анализа на кампања	Ljubco Georgievski

- This list is not complete

== Season 2009/2010 ==
Season 2009/2010
Number of Episode	Air date In Macedonian	Name of Episode	Guests
1	November 28, 2009	Big Brother; Големиот брат	Viktorija Vujovic, Violeta Raleva, Andon Ralev, Aleksandar Belov
2	March 5, 2010	Xhem Hasa; Џемо Хаса	Trajce Drenkovski, Marjan Dimitrijevski, Rufi Osmani
3	May 14, 2010	Goce Delchev; Гоце Делчев	Katarina Trajkova Nurdzieva, Cocho Biljarski, Mihajlo Minovski, Dragi Gjeorgjiev, Dimitar Roljovski, Vancho Gjorgiev
4	May 28, 2010	Ljubco Georgievski; Љубчо Георгиевски	Ljubco Georgievski
5	June 11, 2010	Jasmin Redzepi; Јасмин Реџепи	Jasmin Redzepi
6	June 13, 2010	Humanitarians or Radicals; Хуманитарци или радикали	Sam Vaknin, Jasmin Redzepi

- This list is incomplete

== Season 2008/2009 ==
This season was aired on Channel 5.

Season 2008/2009
Number of Episode	Air date	Name of Episode In Macedonian	Guests
1		Interview: Ljube Boskovski; Интервју: Љубе Бошковски	Ljube Boskovski
2		Macedonian Masons; Македонски масони	Zivko Gruevski
3		The World in 2025; Светот 2025	Stevo Pendarovski, Slobodan Casule, Sam Vaknin, Branko Sinadinovski
4		Kosovo; Косово	Adem Demaci
5		Property of the old VMRO; Имотот на старата ВМРО	Krasimir Karakacanov, Nikolay Tosev, Stefan V. Mihov, Cocho Biljarski, Atanas Popov
6		Are we antic Macedonians or old Slavic ? Дали сме антички македонци или старословени ?	Venko Andonovski, Slobodan Unkovski, Ferid Muhikj, Ivo Banac
7		Law School; Правен факултет	Vlado Buckovski, Gordana S. Davkova, Vancho Uzunov, Denko Maleski
8		Square; Плоштад	Trifun Kostovski, Darko Markovic, Ilija Aceski, Tome Serafimovski, Slobodan Ugrinovski, Blagoja Filipovski
9	February 21, 2009	Agreement Bakojani; Договор Бакојани	Stojan Andov, Jeta Dzara, Ivan Stoiljkovic
10	February 28, 2009	10 Loby groups in Macedonia; 10-те Лоби групи во Македонија	Ljubcho Ziko, Atanasko Tuneski, Sasho Davitkovski, Stojan Naumov, Pasko Kuzman, Jovan Tofovski, Ana P. Daneva and others
11	March 9, 2009	Interview: Bojko Borisov; Интервју: Бојко Борисов	Bojko Borisov
12	March 16, 2009	Elections 2009; Избори 2009	Biljana Vankovska, Andrej Zirinovski, Jove Kekenovski, Liljana Popovska, Karolina r. Asterud, Emira Mehmenti
13	April 1, 2009	Rehabilitation of Venko Markovski; Рехабилитација на Венко Марковски	Gane Todorovski, Milan Gjirchino, Blaze Minevski, Violeta Achkovska, Todor Chepreganov, Stojan Risteski
14	April 8, 2009	Elections 2009, biggest losers Избори 2009, најголеми губитници	Suad Misimi, Stevce Jakimovski, Gordan Georgiev
15	April 17, 2009	Is Bosnia going to be divided ? Дали ке дојде до поделба на Босна ?	Milorad Dodik, Sulejman Tihic, Dragan Covic, Raif Dizdarevic, Munira Subasic
16	May 8, 2009	Branko Crvenkovski, Was he a good president ? Бранко Црвенковски, Дали беше добар претседател ?	Branko Crvenkovski
17	May 29, 2009	Last days of Tito; Последните денови на Јосип Броз Тито	Damir Hranilovic, Raif Dizdarevic, Miro Simcic, Joska Broz
18	June 6, 2009	Last days of Tito 2 Последните денови на Јосип Броз Тито 2	Ludvik Ravnik, Drago Mikelic, Damir Hranilovic, Zarko Petan, Jozhef Oseli, Joska Broz
19	June 12, 2009	SDSM changes in the party СДСМ промените во партијата	Gordan Georgiev, Vlado Buckovski, Mersel Biljali, Gjuner Ismail

- This list is not complete

== Season 2007/2008 ==
This season aired on Kanal 5.

Number of Episode	Air date	Name of Episode In Macedonian	Guests
1			

- This list is not complete

== Season 2006/2007 ==
This season aired on Kanal 5.

Number of Episode	Air date	Name of Episode In Macedonian	Guests
1	cancelled	File: Prime-minister	Iso Rusi, Bekir Iseini, Milovan Stefanovski, Ivan Atanasovski, Hadzi Hadziristeski, Pande Lazarevski, Gjorgji Spasov

- This list is not complete

== See also ==
- Milenko Nedelkovski Show
- Jadi Burek
- Ednooki
- Eden na Eden
- Television in North Macedonia
