= Opushteno =

TV show

- Опуштено
- Genre: Talk show
- Created by: Toni & Deo
- Country of origin: North Macedonia
- Original language: Macedonian

Production
- Production location: Skopje
- Running time: 110 minutes

Original release
- Network: MRT

Opushteno is a television show in North Macedonia hosted by Toni and Deo on Macedonian Radio Television (MRT) since 2013.

== See also ==
- Vo Centar
- Milenko Nedelkovski Show
