= Vesko Kountchev =

- Also known as: Vesko
- Born: Vesselin Valentinov Kountchev (Веселин Валентинов Кунчев); January 17, 1974 (age 52); Sofia, Bulgaria
- Genres: World Music; Classic; Alternative rock Progressive; Punk
- Occupations: musician, producer-composer
- Instruments: viola, drums
- Years active: 1993 - present

Vesko Kountchev (born Vesselin Valentinov Kountchev (Bulgarian: Веселин Валентинов Кунчев) on January 17, 1974 in Sofia, Bulgaria) is a musician.

== Early life ==
Vesko Kountchev (Веско Кунчев) was born in Sofia, Bulgaria. Son of Valentin Kountchev (Валентин Кунчев) artist, musician member of Sofia Philharmonic Orchestra and mother Vitka Ignatova Boeva (proektant). Vesko starts at 5 years old playing violin, under Professor Alexander Serafimov guidance. At 10 years old he assist to the L. Pipkov National Music School Sofia. In this period he studies classical music as well as rock and contemporary music. Vesko becomes member of the alternative group Dissident influenced by Voivod, Slayer, Nirvana, Mr. Bungle, Nine Inch Nails, playing drums and viola.

== Early years and ÑU ==
In 20 of September 1992 he went to Madrid to continue his study in the Real Conservatorio Superior de Música de Madrid. During this time he was invited by José Carlos Molina to become member of Ñu an important progressive rock group based in Madrid between 1995 and 1999.

== Projects and bands ==
As part of his Madrid staying, Vesko participates in various projects, recordings and concerts since 1993 to 2007 with bands like: Samarluna (fusion) Rosana (pop), Angel Moreno Cuarteto (flamenco fusion), Pedro Sanz (flamenco), Labanda (Spanish progressive rock) Inma Serrano, Atmarama Dasa (spiritual music), Macaco - Rumbo Submarino (alternative world music), Undrop (alternative rock, reggae), Dhira (Latin, hip hop, alternative), Orchestre International du Vetex (balcan Latin beat), L. E. Flaco (hip-hop), Cows in Love (spiritual funk alternative), Barxino (Latin electronic beat), Cefalu (alternative Arab indie) etc.

From 2001 Amparo Sánchez invites Vesko to become member of Amparanoia, playing the viola and composing besides Amparo and the other group members, since the album "Somos Viento", "Enchilao" and "La Vida te da".

== Studio records ==
- Bulgar Display of Power“ – 2021
- Amparo Sánchez “Tucson Habana” – 2010
- Amparanoia, “Seguire Caminando” – 2008
- Undrop,“Party“ 2008
- Cows in Love, “Terminal Goloca“ 2007
- Orchestre International du Vetex, “Flamoek Fantasy“ 2007
- Barxino,“Barcelona Mondo Beat Nacion Electrolatina“ 2006
- Atmarama, "Divine Service"
- Atmarama Dasa, “Sri Sri Radha Govinda Chandra“
- Gio Connections "Gio Connections" 2006
- Dhira,"Dhira Sound System" 2005
- RadioChango "Añejo Reserva vol.I" 2005
- Putumayo Presents, "Latin Lounge" 2005
- La Bongo, "Festival"
- Per Palestina, "Recopilatorio" 2003
- Ñu, “Requiem” 2002
- Ñu, "Esperando" 2002
- Macaco, “Rumbo Submarino” 2002
- Undrop, “Uprooted” 2001
- No Hay Dos Sin Tres, “No hay dos sin tres” 2001
- Ñu, “Colección” 2001
- Pedro Sanz, “Yunque, Martillo y Estribo” 2000
- Ñu, “Cuatro Gatos” 1999
- Ñu,"La Danza de las Mil Tierras"
- Undrop, “Boomerang” 1999
- Atmarama Dasa, "Sri Siksastakam" 1999
- Namaste, by Rafa de Guillermo 1999
- Angel Moreno Cuarteto, "Trilogia" 1999
- Inma Serrano, "Rosas de Papel" 1998
- Ñu, "La Noche del Juglar" Grabado en directo 6 de Marzo de 1998
- Ñu, “La Taberna Encantada” 1997
- Angel Moreno Cuarteto, "La Torre Del Tiempo" 1998
- Angel Moreno Cuarteto, "Estrella del Alba" 1996

== Albums with Amparanoia ==
- Amparanoia, “Seguiré Caminando” 2 CDS + 1 DVD, 25 marzo 2008
- Amparanoia, “La Vida Te Da” 2006
- Amparanoia, “Rebeldía Con Alegría” 2004
- Amparanoia, “Enchilao” 2003
- Amparanoia, “Somos Viento” 2002

== DVD ==
- Amparanoia, “Seguiré Caminando” DVD 2008
- Amparanoia, “La Vida Te Da¨ DVD 2006

== Singles ==
- Barxino,“Barxino”– 2006
- Amparanoia,“Dolor Dolor, Alerta, Trabajar” – 2003
- Amparanoia,“Dolor Dolor” – 2003
- Amparanoia,“Si Fuera” – 2003
- Amparanoia,“Ella Baila Bembe” – 2002
- Amparanoia,“Mar Estrecho” – 2002
- Amparanoia,“Somos Viento” – 2002
- Amparanoia,“La Fiesta” – 2002
- No Hay Dos Sin Tres,“Locura” – 2001
- Undrop, “Uprooted Promo single” – 2000
- Undrop, “Mineffield Radio Version” – 2000
