= Milenko Nedelkovski Show =

Television talk show from Macedonia

- Миленко Неделковски Шоу
- Genre: Talk show
- Created by: Milenko Nedelkovski
- Country of origin: North Macedonia
- Original language: Macedonian

Production
- Production location: Skopje
- Running time: 120 - 180 minutes
- Production companies: Wonder International; Tomato Produkcija

Original release
- Network: Kanal 5

The Milenko Nedelkovski Show (Macedonian: Миленко Неделковски Шоу) is a television talk show from North Macedonia hosted by Milenko Nedelkovski.

== Season 10 ==
Standard Season 10 Guests: Vasko Stamevski, Oliver Andonov, Vladimir Bozinovski, Nikola Srbov, Ljubco Zlatev, Boban Nonkovic, Toni Mihajlovski,

| Number of Episode | Air date | Name of Episode In Macedonian | Guests |
|---|---|---|---|
| 1 | September 4, 2015 | As exaggerate with journalism Сé претера со новинарството | Three of the Standard Season 10 Guests |
| 2 | September 11, 2015 | Interview: Vilim Uzicanin; Интервју: Велим Ужичанин | Vilim Uzicanin (Marine Engineer) |
| 3 | September 19, 2015 | Przino agreement Договор од Пржино | Four of the Standard Season 10 Guests |
| 4 | September 25, 2015 | Who rules Macedonian Judiciary ? Кој го владее судството во Македонија ? | Four of the Standard Season 10 Guests |
| 5 | October 2, 2015 | Telekom privatisation Приватизација на Телеком | Four of the Standard Season 10 Guests |
| 6 | October 9, 2015 | Interview: Boutros Boutros-Ghali; Интервју: Бутрос Бутрос Гали | Boutros Boutros-Ghali (Diplomat) |
| 7 | October 16, 2015 | Interview: Marina Ragus; Интервју: Марина Рагуш | (Politician) |
| 8 | October 23, 2015 | Law for Special Prosecution; Закон за Специјално Обвинителство | Todorovski and three of the Standard Season 10 Guests |
| 9 | November 6, 2015 | Celebrating Day of the Macedonian Revolutionary Struggle; Прославување на Денот на Македонската Револуционерна Борба | Four of the Standard Season 10 Guests |
| 10 | November 14, 2015 | Foreign Investments in Macedonia; Странски инвестиции во Македонија | Alek Nikovski; Vele Samak; Viktor Mizo |
| 11 | November 20, 2015 | Interview: Thierry Meyssan; Интервју: Тиери Мејсан | Thierry Meyssan (Journalist) |
| 12 | November 27, 2015 | Interview: Domagoje Nikolic; Интервју: Домигоје Николиќ | Domagoje Nikolic (Independent Researcher) |
| 13 | December 4, 2015 | SOC and MOC-OA; СПЦ и МПЦ-ОА | Aleksandar Rakovic; Veljko Gjuric Mishina and two of the Standard Season 10 Guests |
| 14 | December 18, 2015 | Interview: Aleksandr Dugin; Интервју: Александар Дугин | Aleksandr Dugin (Political scientist) |
| 15 | December 26, 2015 | Interview: Mirka Velinovska; Интервју: Мирка Велиновска | Mirka Velinovska (Journalist) |
| 16 | January 8, 2016 | Interview: Erich von Däniken; Интервју: Ерик вон Деникен | Erich von Däniken (Author) |
| Special edition | January 12, 2016 | Operation: Nocturne; Операција: Ноктурно | Mirka Velinovska (Journalist) |
| 17 | January 15, 2016 | Security questions Безбедносни прашања | Three of the Standard Season 10 Guests; Special appearance: Doughnut (dog) |
| Special edition | January 18, 2016 | Operation: Nocturne 2 Операција: Ноктурно 2 | Mirka Velinovska (Journalist) |
| 18 | January 22, 2016 | Kabli Negotino, EVN; Кабли Неготино, ЕВН | none |
| 19 | January 30, 2016 | Functionality of the Technical Government; Функционирање на Техничка Влада | Four of the Standard Season 10 Guests |

- This list is not complete

== Season 9 ==
| Number of Episode | Air date | Name of Episode In Macedonian | Guests |
|---|---|---|---|
| 1 | July 3, 2015 | Interview: Milorad Dodik; Интервју: Милорад Додик | Milorad Dodik (President) |
| 2 | July 27, 2015 | Interview: Daniele Ganser; Интервју: Даниел Гансер | Daniele Ganser (Historian) |

- This list is not complete

== Season 8 ==
| Number of Episode | Air Date | Name of Episode In Macedonian | Guests |
|---|---|---|---|
| 1 | March 7, 2014 | Interview: Nikola Gruevski; Интервју: Никола Груевски | Nikola Gruevski (Prime Minister) |

- This list is not complete

== Season 7 ==
| Number of Episode | Air Date | Name of Episode In Macedonian | Guests |
|---|---|---|---|
| 1 | | | |

- This list is not complete

== Season 6 ==
| Number of Episode | Air Date | Name of Episode In Macedonian | Guests |
|---|---|---|---|
| 1 | | | |

- This list is not complete

== Season 5 ==
| Number of Episode | Air Date | Name of Episode In Macedonian | Guests |
|---|---|---|---|
| 1 | | | |

- This list is not complete

== Season 4 ==
| Number of Episode | Air Date | Name of Episode In Macedonian | Guests |
|---|---|---|---|
| 1 | | | |

- This list is not complete

== Season 3 ==
| Number of Episode | Air Date | Name of Episode In Macedonian | Guests |
|---|---|---|---|
| 1 | February 9, 2009 | Interview: Gjorge Ivanov; Интервју Ѓорѓе Иванов | Gjorge Ivanov (President) |
| 2 | March 27, 2009 | Interview: Nikola Gruevski; Интервју: Никола Груевски | Nikola Gruevski (Prime Minister) |

- This list is not complete

== Season 2 ==
| Number of Episode | Air Date | Name of Episode In Macedonian | Guests |
|---|---|---|---|
| 1 | September 2, 2008 | Interview: Miroslav Lazanski; Интервју: Мирослав Лазањски | Miroslav Lazanski (Journalist) |
| 2 | December 19, 2008 | Interview: Nikola Gruevski; Интервју: Никола Груевски | Nikola Gruevski (Prime Minister) |

- This list is not complete

== Season 1 ==
| Number of Episode | Air date | Name of Episode In Macedonian | Guests |
|---|---|---|---|
| 1 | October 12, 2007 | Interview: Jovan Vrniskovski; Интервју: Јован Врнишковски | Jovan Vrniskovski (Cleric) |
| 2 | May 11, 2008 | Interview: Nikola Gruevski; Интервју: Никола Груески | Nikola Gruevski (Prime Minister) |

- This list is not complete

== See also ==
- Vo Centar so Vasko Eftov
- Eden na Eden
- Ednooki
- Jadi Burek
