= Balcaen =

The Flemish name Balcaen originates from old French balcan: stud horse.

Spelling may vary to :

- with -a-, -ae ou -aa-
- with -c-, -k- ou -ck-
- the sound a can change to become -u- ou -o-
- with a genitive suffixe -s

Possible spelling :

- Balcaen, Balcan, Balcans
- Balkaen, Balkan
- Baelcaen
- Bolcaen
- Bulckaen, Bulkaen, Bulckaan, Bulkaan

== Patronym ==
=== Balcaen ===
- Raoul F. Balcaen III, also known as Sonny Balcaen, American dragster racer and businessman
- Ronny Balcaen a Belgian political figure

=== Balcan ===
- George Balcan, a Quebec member of the order of Canada

=== Bulckaen ===
The street name "Rue des frères Bulckaen" located in Comines, France (Nord-Pas-de-Calais) has its name originating from a succession of marshals-ferrand and cartwrights. Another origin would result from the death of three brothers named Bulckaen during the first world war.

Origin of the patronymic: The name being of origin Flemish, a cut of the name can also look: Bull - kaen: horn of bulls / or / strength of bulls

Other sources point out the origin as coming from the Dutch word pijp ( for tube, pipe ), giving the metronymic name for the music instrument player.

Madeleine Bulckaen, dean of the family, achieved her 100th birthday in 2010.

== Localisation ==
Originated from Flemish Belgium, the name is now present through Dutchland, northern and eastern France, on the United States west and east coast, and in Canada Primarily in Saskatoon, Saskatchewan; also California, (San Diego, Huntington Beach and Pacific Grove) Calgary, Alberta & parts of Manitoba. (Also Quebec, but with alternate spellings.) The Saskatoon, California (San Diego, Huntington Beach and Pacific Grove) & Calgary Balcaens are directly descended from the Balcaen-Vandeput TransAtlantic Diamond Merchants (& Ocean Liner Fleets) of the late 18th & early 19th Centuries.
