= Ednooki =

- Еднооки
- Genre: Cartoon
- Created by: Boris Damovski
- Country of origin: North Macedonia
- Original language: Macedonian
- No. of seasons: 9

Production
- Production location: Skopje
- Running time: 10 - 15 minutes
- Production company: Kontrabanda Produkcija

Original release
- Network: A1 Televizija; Kanal 5
- Release: April 2006

Ednooki (Macedonian: Еднооки, 'One-eyed') was a Macedonian satirical animated show from Kontrabanda Produkcija. The show was first aired in April 2006 on A1, later on Kanal 5 until 2007 and currently on Alfa TV.

== Pay per view ==
As of September 2014 the show has been available via pay per view on www.parahodot.tv

== See also ==
- Vo Centar
- The Milenko Nedelkovski Show
- Jadi Burek
- Eden na Eden
