= Dira =

Dira may refer to:

== People ==
- Bernadett Dira (born 1980), Hungarian biathlete
- Dira Paes (born 1969), Brazilian actress
- Dira Sugandi, Indonesian singer and actress
- Dira Abu Zahar, Malaysian politician and former actress

== Places ==
- Dira, Burkina Faso
- Dira, a village in Borno State, Nigeria

== Other ==
- Dira (butterfly), genus of butterflies from the subfamily Satyrinae in the family Nymphalidae
- Dira, a minor character in the TV series Rimba Racer
- Deficiency of the interleukin-1–receptor antagonist (DIRA), autoinflammatory syndrome
- Dirac (dress) or dirá, Somali garment
- dira, also transliterated dhira, one of the ancient Arabic units of measurement

== See also ==
- Dhira, Punjab, India
