= K-15 (TV series) =

- Genre: Comedy
- Created by: Vasko Todorov; Ljupčo "Bubo" Karov; Branko Ognjanovski
- Country of origin: Republic of Macedonia
- Original language: Macedonian

Production
- Camera setup: 1995–Present
- Running time: 4–10 min. per skit

Original release
- Network: MTV, Sitel, A1, Kanal 5, Alfa
- Release: 1994 – 2012 (to return in November 2024)

K-15 was a Macedonian comedy show project established in the mid-1990s in Macedonia. It is mostly made up of episodes of short comedy sketches and spoofs on the Macedonian language. K-15 as a term is used for other projects with the group, such as the comical music of Duo Trio, different kinds of commercials or guest appearances in other shows and films such as Balkankan.

K-15 was formed by Vasko Todorov, Ljupčo "Bubo" Karov and Branko Ognjanovski, with frequent appearances of other actors/comedians. The three founders are also co-directors and co-producers.

K-15 is to return on the 23rd of November 2024, as to mark 30 years of the show's existence.

== History ==
The three characters decided to create a unique job opportunity for themselves - a weekly comedy show, not only providing them with a salary, but also entertaining and making laugh all those who live, know of, or have experience with the social and cultural situation in Macedonia. The first episode was broadcast on November 23, 1994 on A1 TV.

Since then, the show has provided strong social, political, and economic criticism of various peculiar events in the Macedonian society, ethnic tolerance, stereotypes, taboo-topics and the environment. K-15 aired on many TV channels such as MTV 1, Sitel, A1, Alfa TV and K-15 TV. In 2008 the group decided to form their own independent channel known as K-15 TV. The channel airs predominately Macedonian music with occasional K-15 sketches and commercials. K-15 TV is available on the satellite network too. They also have their own YouTube channel with more than 900 videos.

== Impact on society ==
While the show had ended in 2013, the Macedonian comedy trio has helped pave the very narrow path of open-mindedness and embodiment of the concepts of freedom of thought, expression and opinion, while shattering a half century old tradition of self-righteousness, faux-perfectionism, and pretentiousness that stem from the one party social order of communism in the former Yugoslavia.

The fan base of K-15 is extremely wide in Macedonia. This is mainly fitting with the content of the jokes and skits of the show; problems and issues everyone can see first hand in their own community. Additionally, the show has also received a very large following outside of Macedonia as well, especially in the Macedonian diaspora in the United States, Canada, Germany, Switzerland, Sweden and Australia.
