= Sitel 3 =

Satellite television channel in North Macedonia

Sitel 3 Сител 3
- Country: North Macedonia
- Broadcast area: North Macedonia
- Network: Trade Broadcasting Company Sitel 3 DOOEL
- Headquarters: Skopje, North Macedonia

Programming
- Language: Macedonian
- Picture format: 16:9 (576i, SDTV); 16:9 (1080i, HDTV)

Ownership
- Owner: Zoran Dodevski; SBS Broadcasting Group; ProSiebenSat.1 Media
- Sister channels: Sitel; Sitel 2

History
- Launched: July 1, 2008
- Closed: February 21, 2018

Links
- Website: www.sitel.com.mk

Availability

Terrestrial
- Digital: Channel ?
- Boom TV: Channel ?

Streaming media
- WebMax TV: 009 Watch Live (MKD) Only
- OnNet: Watch Live (MKD) Only

Sitel 3 was a satellite television channel in North Macedonia. It got closed 8 years ago

== Lineup ==
Jadi Burek

FIBA EuroBasket

FIBA Basketball World Cup
