= Amparanoia =

Spanish singer/guitarist and her band

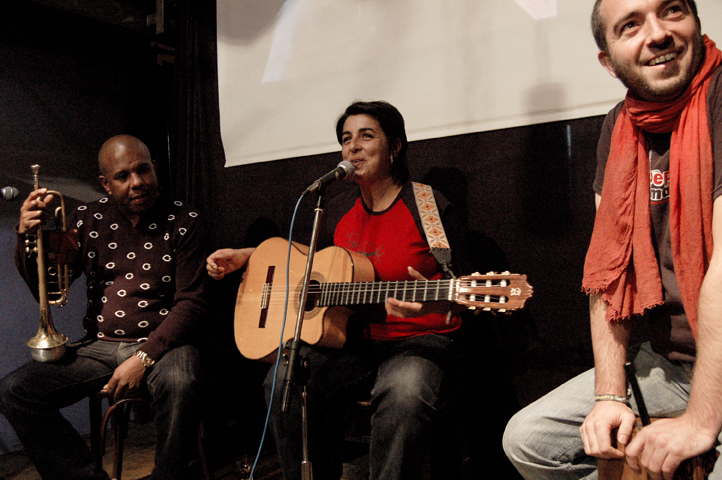
- Part of the band Amparanoia, September 2008

Background information
- Origin: Alcalá la Real, Spain
- Genres: Rock; Reggae; Alternative
- Years active: 1996–present
- Labels: La Marmita Productions
- Members: Amparo Sánchez; José Alberto Varona; Vesko Kountchev; Jordi Mestres; Daniel Tejedor; Tomas Rundqvist; Néstor Gutiérrez; Oscar Ferret; Lázaro Ordóñez

Amparanoia is the stage name of Spanish singer/guitarist Amparo Sánchez which combines her first name with the word 'paranoia'. It was also the name of the band she fronted from 1996 to 2006. Her debut album, El Poder de Machín, has been described as "bright, exuberant... with a heavy Latin influence", whereas the 2002-released Somos Viento has been called "a more acoustic blend of Cuban and reggae forms".

== Biography ==
Born in Granada, Spain, in 1970, Amparo Sánchez joined her first band, the Correcaminos (Roadrunners) at 16, a year after apparently becoming a mother for the first time. With Billie Holiday as her chief inspiration, Sánchez quickly established herself as the foremost vocalist in the region with a repertoire spanning such genres as blues, soul, rock, and jazz. She formed Amparo & the Gang in the early '90s. The group released Haces Bien on Fabrica Magnetica in 1993, only to see the label fold two months later. Amparo & the Gang broke up and, despite many work opportunities around Granada, Sánchez moved to Madrid.

For 18 months in 1995-6 she developed an enthusiastic following playing the Spanish capital's active club circuit. She also expanded her musical range by absorbing classic Cuban forms through exposure to Madrid's Latin music scene while Manu Chao mentored her in other Caribbean styles. Sánchez developed a side group named Ampáranos del Blues (Protect Us From the Blues), that toured parts of Spain and southern France.

By December 1996, the first edition of Amparanoia (the wordplay gets better once you know it comes from the verb amparar, meaning to protect) was recording its first demo and quickly landed a deal with the Edel label. Amparanoia's 1997 debut album, El Poder de Machín (a reference to bolero-singer Antonio Machín), is a bright, exuberant disc with a heavy Latin influence, but each of the group's three releases has a distinct flavor. The hard-charging Feria Furiosa, released in 1999, reflects the participation of a contingent of radical Basque rock and punk musicians.

The line-up that made these albums fell apart late 1999. Amparo went on to record an album of children's songs which she released as Los Bebesones.

A trip to Mexico late 2000 left its mark when she came into contact with the Zapatista communities in Chiapas. On returning to Spain, she organized a sound system mini-tour with like-minded musician friends to raise funds and Sánchez also went back to Mexico in March 2001 to take part in the Zapatista caravan in Mexico City.

2002's Somos Viento blends Cuban and reggae acoustically. Violist Vesko Kountchev is from Bulgaria and introduces a new Balkan influence to the mix, which is typical since the group lineup and guest artists always come from a wide range of musical cultures and usually a song or two per album has verses sung in English or French.

In 2003, the year that Enchilado was released, Amparo recorded Don't Leave Me Now with Calexico as backing musicians. The track appeared in 2004 on compilation Rebeldía con Alegría which covers all her albums except Bebesones.

In 2006 Amparanoia released their final album La Vida Te Da and recorded a live CD/DVD at the Barcelona Sala Apollo in November. Seguire caMinando was released in 2008 and promoted on a byebye-tour.

In 2010, Amparo Sánchez released her debut solo album Tucson-Habana.

== Discography ==
=== Albums ===
- El Poder de Machín 1997
- Feria Furiosa 1999
- Somos Viento 2002
- Enchilao 2003
- Rebeldía con Alegría 2004
- La Vida Te Da 2006
- Seguiré caminando 2008
- Tucson-Habana 2010
- El Coro de Mi Gente 2017
- Fan Fan Fanfarria (with Artistas del Gremio) 2024

=== Solo ===
- Transadelica (with Yacine Belahcene) 2010
- Espiritu Del Sol 2014
- Alma de Cantaora 2016
- Hermanas 2019
- La Niña y el Lobo 2020
- Himnopsis Colectiva 2021

=== Singles ===
- Hacer Dinero 1997
- En La Noche 1997
- Me Lo Hago Sola 1997
- Que Te Den 1998
- ¿Que Será De Mí? 1999
- Desperado 1999
- La Pared 1999
- La Maldición 1999
- Llámame Mañana 2000
- La Fiesta 2002
- Somos Viento 2002
- Mar Estrecho 2002
- Ella Baila Bembe" 2002
- Dolor Dolor" 2003
- Dolor Dolor Alerta Trabajar 2003
- Caravane 2004
- Don't Leave me Now 2003
- La Vida te Da 2006
- La Vida te Da (corte ingles) 2006

=== Collaborations ===
- Més raons de pes. El tribut a Umpah-Pah. 2009, collaboration with Enrique Bunbury, Iván Ferreiro and Pep Blay as art director.

== Musicians 1997 - 2008 ==
1. Amparo Sánchez (lead singer, guitar) 1996
2. Eldys Isak Vega (piano, drums, percussion) 1998 - 2006
3. Jose Alberto Varona (trumpet) 1999
4. Tomas Runquist (guitar, sitar, chorus) 2002, 2008
5. Carmen Niño (bass, chorus) 2001
6. Frank Padilla (drums, percussion) 2002
7. Vesko Kountchev (viola, percussion) 2001 - 2004, 2008, 2017
8. Susana Ruiz (voice, chorus) - 2002
9. Jairo Zavala (guitar) 1997
10. Jordi Mestres (double bass, guitar) 2005
11. Daniel Tejedor (drums) 2005 - 2006, 2008
12. Robert Johnson (guitar) 1997 - 1999
13. Piluca la Terremoto (voice, chorus) 1997 - 1999
14. Yago Salorio (bass) 1997 - 1999
15. Andrés Cisneros (percussion) 1997 - 1998
16. Sito Camacho (percussion) 1997 - 1998
17. Alfonso Rivas (percussion) 1998 - 1999
18. Namsan Fong (guitar) 2004 - 2005
19. Caridad Borges (piano) 2004 - 2005
20. Nestor "el Yuri" (percussion) 2001 - 2006, 2008
21. Lazaro Ordoñez (trombone) 2008
22. Oscar Ferret (piano) 2008
23. Joel Dominguez (bajo) 2008
