= Dragan Pavlović Latas =

Macedonian journalist (born 1960)

Dragan Pavlović Latas (Macedonian: Драган Павловиќ Латас, born 1960) is a Macedonian journalist. He served as the managing editor of the national TV Sitel, and daily newspaper Večer.

== Biography ==
Dragan Pavlović Latas was born in Skopje on 25 February 1960. Pavlović is a Serb. In the 1980s, he graduated in economics from the University of Belgrade. In that period, he began his journalistic career, serving as the journalist of Yugoslav Macedonian newspaper Mlad Borec from 1980 to 1984. In the 1990s, he served as the editor of Radio Kanal plus and Radio Fox in Skopje. In 2005, he graduated in political science from FON University. He is a member of the Macedonian Association of Journalists and served as its general secretary.

He served as the main editor of the newspaper Večer and the national channel Sitel. On 17 May 2006, on the International Day against Homophobia, the Macedonian Association for Free Sexual Orientation (MASSO) declared him as the most homophobic public person of the year. Pavlović has written homophobic articles and columns such as "Faggotology", "Assholes and Butt holes", "Eurovision", etc. In his column "Faggotology," Pavlović wrote: "And faggots are nothing else but people who commune with those like themselves. A closed circle. They are afraid of those who are different." He received a master's degree from the European University Skopje in 2009.

He was accused of cooperating with the Serbian secret service during the Yugoslav Wars by the Macedonian newspaper Vreme (Time) in 2010. In December 2011, he received a PhD in the field of marketing. In 2014, he was subject to criticism by ethnic Albanian journalists and non-governmental organizations for saying that ethnic Macedonians should vote "massively" for prime minister Nikola Gruevski and the political party VMRO-DPMNE to prevent Albanian from becoming the second official language in the country. In 2016, after Pavlović had apologized for the speech, Macedonian Turks protested outside pro-government Sitel's headquarters in Skopje and asked him to resign, after he told opposition leader Zoran Zaev in an interview: "You are lying like a Turk." After the interview, local journalist associations assessed his conduct as being below journalistic standards and that he used hate speech and insults. The interview was condemned by the Media Information Agency, which stated that he did not respect journalistic standards while interviewing Zaev. The Council on Media Ethics of Macedonia, the Turkish embassy in Macedonia and the Association of Journalists of Macedonia and Agency for Audio and Audiovisual Media Services also condemned his conduct. On the other hand, the Macedonian Association of Journalists expressed support for Pavlović. In 2025, the Association of Journalists of Macedonia and the Independent Union of Journalists and Media Workers condemned his public statements, in which he targeted journalists from media outlets such as Investigative Reporting Laboratory, 360 Degrees and BIRN Macedonia, through a private Facebook page, by misusing private photographs from their profiles and using them in his statements.

== Legal issues ==
On 4 July 2019, the Judicial Council at the Criminal Court of Skopje acquitted Pavlović and his brothers for unauthorized construction of villas in Zelenikovo.

In 2023, the Association of Journalists of Macedonia, the Independent Union of Journalists and Media Workers and the Council for Ethics in the Media of Macedonia condemned the speech that incites violence and stimulates gender discrimination that appeared on a video on YouTuber Stefan Lazarov's podcast on YouTube, in which Pavlović shared that as a teenager he participated in sexually harassing and raping a girl, laughing about it with Lazarov. In response, the Cybercrime Department of the Ministry of Interior submitted a report to the Skopje Prosecutor's Office, after which an investigation was opened, and the video was removed from YouTube. On 21 February, the Skopje Prosecutor's Office indicted him and Lazarov for "spreading racist and xenophobic material via an information system". He and Lazarov were initially convicted, but after an appeal, the Skopje Court of Appeal had the case returned for a retrial. The Skopje Criminal Court acquitted him and Lazarov in the retrial in March 2026.
