= Pep Blay =

Spanish writer, script writer and music journalist

Josep Blay Boqué (born 2 September 1966) known professionally as Pep Blay, is a Catalan writer, script writer and music journalist. As a music journalist, he has interviewed a variety of performers, including Lou Reed, The Cure and Nick Cave. He often works with Spanish artists, including Enrique Bunbury, Iván Ferreiro, and Amparanoia.

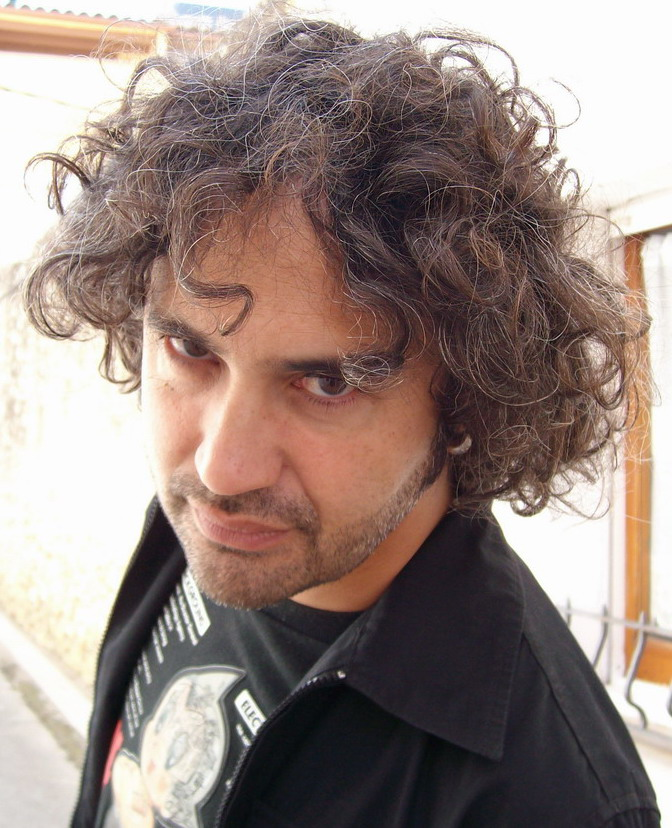
Pep Blay

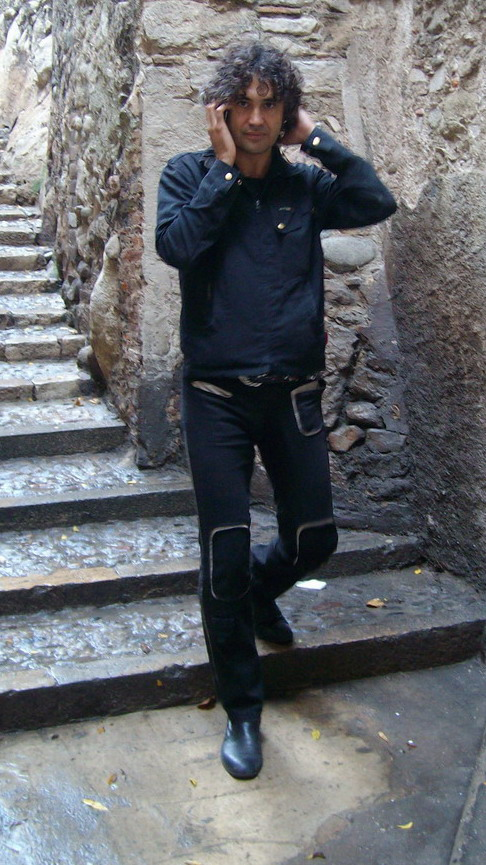
Pep Blay

== Biography ==
Blay was born on 2 September 1966 in Tarragona, Spain, the youngest of three children. He studied Catalan philology at Universitat de Barcelona, faculty of Tarragona from 1984 to 1989. During his studies he worked as a cultural journalist for the Catalan newspaper Catalunya Sud. He also published poems for the magazine Negre+Roig and founded the collective Andrògina Productions.

After his studies, he moved to Barcelona to begin higher education in theatre theory and critics; he also learnt Japanese. That same year he started to write about literature for the Catalan newspaper AVUI and edited the supplement Rock & Classics. He also worked for magazines like El Temps, Catalònia and Cultura. Between 1990 and 2000 Blay occasionally performed poetry live; a few of his performances can be found in the DVD Poesia en viu a Barcelona (Habitual Video Team/ Propost.org, 1991–2003).

His career as a music journalist started with AVUI in 1993. That same year, he also began to sing in the Tarragonian post mortem-underground band Els Patètix; he spent three years in that group. In 1995, he published a biography of the Catalan musician and songwriter Lluís Llach for the collection Los Autores (SGAE Barcelona). In 1999, Blay started to work for the Catalan TV-channel Televisió de Catalunya as programme director for the cabaret Bohèmia, and also as script writer and art director. He wrote two more biographies about Catalan rockbands: Sopa de Cabra. Si et quedes amb mi, Rosa dels Vents, in 2002 and Els Pets. Cara a cara, Rosa dels Vents, in 2003. In the magazine Enderrock, he created the column "Sexe, Blay & rock'n'roll".

He travelled through Europe, the US, Island, Tanzania and Mexico. In September 2003, he started a one-year-trip around the world to Australia, New Zealand, Papua New Guinea, Brazil and Japan. These experiences led to work as script writer for the travel programme Km33 on the Catalan TV-channel TV3. Thanks to that job, he continued travelling to Morocco, Burkina Faso, Mali and the US. He sends reports about travelling and other topics to the Catalan radio station iCat.

Blay has long been interested in vampirism and polypoetry, and his first novel Vampíria Sound (Plaza & Janés Editores, S.A., 2004), is a radical contemporary music thriller. The biography he wrote about Enrique Bunbury - called Enrique Bunbury. Lo demás es silencio (Plaza & Janés) - found readers amongst both Spanish-speaking and international fans of Enrique Bunbury and his former band Héroes del Silencio. The book has also been published in Mexico.

In 2009, Gotholàndia, a teen fantasy novel in Catalan, was published by Montena. At the same time Erótica Mix, four short stories about music and sex, were published both in Catalan (Rosa dels Vents) and in Spanish (Plaza & Janés). At the end of the year, Blay worked as art director to produce the CD Més raons de pes. El tribut an Umpah-Pah with Enrique Bunbury, Iván Ferreiro, Amparanoia, and other musicians.

== Works ==
- Lluís Llach, a biography of the Catalan musician and songwriter Lluís Llach. Col•lecció "Los Autores", Barcelona, 1995, SGAE.
- Sopa de Cabra. Si et quedes amb mi, about the Catalan rock band Sopa de Cabra. Barcelona, 2002, Rosa dels Vents. 1st edition, 336 pages, Catalan. ISBN 84-01-38607-1; ISBN 978-84-01-38607-7.
- Els Pets. Cara a cara, a history of the Catalan rock band Els Pets. Barcelona, 2003, Rosa dels Vents. 1st edition, 360 pages, Catalan. ISBN 84-01-38630-6; ISBN 978-84-01-38630-5.
- Vampíria Sound, a novel about music with thriller and vampirism elements. Barcelona, 2004, Plaza & Janés Editores S.A. Colección Narrativa Rosa dels vents. Catalan. ISBN 84-01-38654-3.
- Enrique Bunbury. Lo demás es silencio, a biography of Spanish singer and songwriter Enrique Bunbury. Barcelona, 2007, Plaza & Janés. 448 pages, Spanish. ISBN 978-84-01-30551-1.
- Gotholàndia, a fantasy novel for older children and teenagers. Barcelona, 2009, Montena. 272 pages, Catalan. ISBN 978-84-8441-504-6.
- Eròtica Mix, four short stories. In Catalan: Barcelona, 2009, Rosa dels Vents. 304 pages. ISBN 978-84-01-38727-2. In Spanish: Barcelona, 2009, Plaza & Janés. 296 pages. ISBN 978-84-01-33707-9.
- Pretòria. Barcelona, 2010, Ed. Alisis. Ara Llibres SCCL. 229 pages, Catalan. ISBN 978-84-937628-6-5.
