= Zan Mitrev =

Macedonian surgeon and academic

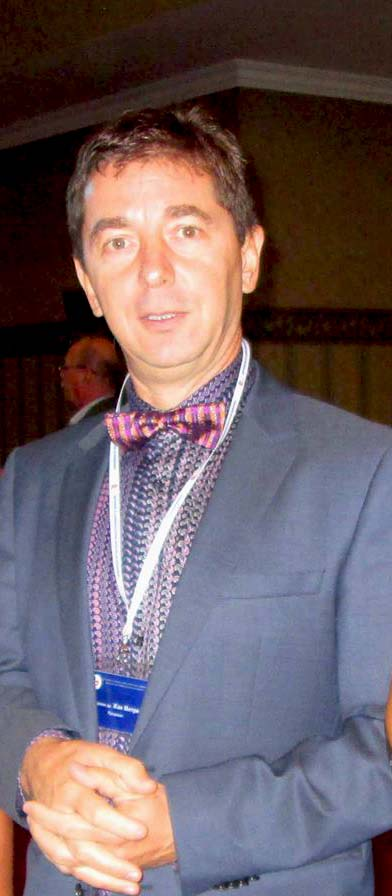
Dr. Zan Mitrev

Dr. Zan Mitrev (Macedonian: Жан Митрев) (born 11 January 1961) is a Macedonian cardiovascular surgeon and medical academic currently working and residing in Skopje, North Macedonia. Since 1999, he has served as the owner and General Manager of the Žan Mitrev Clinic (formerly the Filip Vtori Clinic), a private surgical hospital in Skopje.
