= Eden na Eden =

- Also known as: One on One
- Created by: Žarko Dimitrioski
- Presented by: Žarko Dimitrioski
- Country of origin: Macedonia
- Original language: Macedonian
- No. of seasons: 12

Production
- Executive producer: Milan Dimitrioski
- Producer: 1on1 Agency
- Running time: 50 minutes

Original release
- Network: Kanal 5
- Release: 2008 – present

Eden na Eden (Macedonian: Еден на еден) is a Macedonian talk show that airs weekly on Kanal 5 TV. It is the highest rated talk show in the country and it is hosted by Žarko Dimitrioski, prominent media personality in Macedonia.

The first season of the show was broadcast in 2008 on A2 TV. For the second season it was moved up to A1 TV, where it aired until the closing of the TV-network in 2011. From the third season onward the show was broadcast on Alfa TV, and since its 7th season, it airs on the Telma TV-network. Starting October 2017th, Eden na Eden is broadcast on Kanal 5 TV. At the moment it is airing its 12th season.

The show's guests have been the most popular and famous actors, singers and athletes from the Balkan region, even politicians including: the Ambassador of USA in Macedonia Jess Baily, Nikola Dimitrov, Stevo Pendarovski, Gordana Siljanovska Davkova and others. The show has regular guests that have appeared multiple times during the years including Zdravko Colic, Lepa Brena, Goran Bregovic, Vlado Georgiev, Željko Samardžić, Nina Badrić, Kaliopi, Jelena Rozga, Tijana Dapčević, Ana Bekuta, Šaban Šaulić, Karolina Gočeva, Dragan Bjelogrlić, Kiki Lesendrić, Rade Šerbedžija, Vlatko Stefanovski, Igor Dzambazov, Sasko Kocev, Grandmaster Flash, Blackstreet, Tamara Todevska, Goran Pandev, Eljif Elmas, and many others.

In 2014, 2016 and 2017 it received the prestigious Macedonian award Golden Ladybug of Popularity, for TV-show of the year. And in 2018 it received the TV show of the year award from the magazine Story.

== Format and structure ==
Every episode starts with the opening credit sequence, featuring the host walking through a series of pictures depicting the evolution during the 10 seasons. At the start, Dimitrioski delivers a stand-up opening monologue containing jokes about current events, pop culture, or politics. Following the monologue, the show may feature one or more comedy skits or recurring segments, after which Dimitrioski brings out that evening's celebrity guests for one-on-one interviews. The final segment of the show features a live performance from a musical guest.

The main focus of the show is on the portion containing celebrity interviews. The show's house band is the Guru Hare Band, known for being the musicians accompanying big stars on concerts like Tose Proeski, Igor Dzambazov and others.

== Episodes ==
=== Season 5 (2013–14) ===
Number of episode	Guests
1	Vlatko Stefanovski (Musician), Aleksandar Popovski (Director)
2	Igor Džambazov (Showman), Dusan Petkovski (Magician)
3	Katarina Ivanovska (Model), Toni Zen (Rapper)
4	Stojanče Stoilov (Handball player), Vanco Dimovski (Handball player), Lambe Alabakoski (Singer)
5	Nikola Jankov-Koki (Singer of duo Dule&Koki)
6	Gjoko Hadžievski (football coach), Anastasija Budjic (Model)
7	Gordana Naceva (Handball player), Indira Kastratović (Handball player)
8	Marko Marinkovic-Slatkar (Rapper), Dragan Velickovki-Tajzi (Singer), Viktor Petrov-Viksa (Rapper)
9	Jelena Rozga (Singer)
10	Janko Ilkovski (Show host), Žarko Bogatinov-Žare Berber (Showman), Dubioza kolektiv Members (Bosanian band)
11	NO GUESTS SPECIAL NEW YEAR EPISODE
12	Filip Mirkulovski, Branislav Angelovski, Petar Angelov, Vlatko Mitkov (Handballers of the Macedonian National Handball Team)
13	Ilina Arsova (Alpinist), Tijana Dapčević (Singer)
14	Željko Samardžić (Singer), Koćo Andonovski (gay activist)
15	Darko Gelev-Brejk (Singer), Mile Kuzmanovski (Singer)
16	Andrea Lekić (Handball player), Sergei Samsonenko (Businessman)
17	Dragan Bjelogrlić (Actor)
18	Tamara Milanovic (Singer), Daniel Kajmakoski (Singer)
19	Petar Strugar, Andrija Kuzmanović, Predrag Vasic, Ivan Zekic (Actors from the film Montevideo, God Bless You!)
20	Kiki Lesendrić (Singer)
21	Vlatko Stefanovski (Musician), Mile Stojkoski (Athlete)
22	Sasko Kocev (Actor), Oliver Mitkovski (Actor), Aleksandar Mikik (actor)
23	Superhiks (Band) Members
24	Renato Vugrinec (Handball player)
25	Retrospective show

=== Season 6 (2014–15) ===
Number of episode	Date	Guests
1	22 November 2014	Renato Vugrinec (Handball player)
2	29 November 2014	Branko Ognjanovski (Actor)
3	6 December 2014	Karolina Goceva (Singer), Nina Badrić (Singer)
4	13 December 2014	Igor Džambazov (Showman)
5	20 December 2014	Dario Pankovski (Singer), Vlatko Lozanoski (Singer)
6	27 December 2014	Ljupco Bubo Karov (actor K-15)
7	10 January 2015	Viktorija Loba (Singer), Sara Kostadinovska-Mejs(Singer)
8	24 January 2015	Elena Risteska (Singer)
9	31 January 2015	Sasko Kocev (Actor)
10	7 February 2015	Vlado Georgiev (Singer)
11	14 February 2015	Lila Stojanovska (Show Hostess), Vasko Eftov (Journalist)
12	28 February 2015	Borislav Dimitrov – Bobo (Rapper), Blackstreet (American band) Members
13	7 March 2015	Šaban Šaulić (Singer), Ana Bekuta (Singer)
14	14 March 2015	Naum Petreski (Singer), Zuica Lazova (Singer), Vlatko Stefanovski
15	21 March 2015	Bora Đorđević (Singer)
16	28 March 2015	Stojanče Stoilov (Handball player)
17	4 April 2015	Vasko Todorov (actor K-15)
18	11 April 2015	Gjorgji Čekovski (Basketball player), Todor Gečevski (Basketball player), Lazar Lecic (Former Basketball player)
19	18 April 2015	Toni Zen (Rapper)
20	25 April 2015	Kristijan Sekulovski (Actor), Marija Angelovska (Actor), Filip Kiprovski (Actor)
21	2 May 2015	Aki Rahimovski (Singer and member of Parni Valjak)
22	9 May 2015	Kiril Lazarov (Handball player)
23	16 May 2015	Retrospective show

Number of episode	Date	Guests
Web Exclusive	21 October 2014	Rade Šerbedžija (Actor)
Web Exclusive	12 February 2015	Marjana Stanojkovska (TV Presenter)

=== Season 7 (2015–16) ===
Number of episode	Date	Guests
1	28 November 2015	Igor Džambazov (Artist)
2	5 December 2014	Branko Đurić (Actor)
3	12 December 2015	Petko (Fictional character); Featuring: Superhiks (Band)
4	19 December 2015	Timur Dibirov (Handball player)
5	26 December 2015	Sasko Kocev (Actor), Slavisha Kajevski (Actor)
6	16 January 2016	Goran Trifunovski – Pajak (Actor/Singer)
7	23 January 2016	Emilija Rozman (Model), Elena Risteska (Singer)
8	30 January 2016	Željko Samardžić (Singer)
9	6 February 2016	Daniel Kajmakoski (Singer)
10	13 February 2016	Karolina Gočeva (Singer), Duke Bojadziev (Musician)
11	20 February 2016	Goran Mihajlovski (Journalist)
12	27 February 2016	Marjana Stanojkovska (TV Presenter)
13	5 March 2016	Saša Kovačević (Singer)
14	12 March 2016	Tamara Todevska (Singer)
15	19 March 2016	Vesna Petrusevska (Actress)
16	26 March 2016	DNK (Band)
17	2 April 2016	Sergej Ćetković (Singer)
18	9 April 2016	Vlatko Vasilj (Facebook/Twitter celebrity)
19	16 April 2016	Borko Ristovski (Handball player)
20	23 April 2016	Branko Ognjanovski (Actor) as Tošo Malerot, Klime and Zoran, fictional characters from K-15 show
21	30 April 2016	Nick Vujicic (motivational speaker), Isidora Bjelica (writer)
22	7 May 2016	Martija Stanojkovik (Singer), Antonija Gigovska (Singer); Featuring: Elena Risteska (Singer)
23	14 May 2016	Jovanka Radičević (handball player), Andrea Penezić (handball player)
24	21 May 2016	Final retrospective episode

=== Season 8 (2016–17) ===
Number of episode	Date	Guests
1	12 November 2016	Bora Đorđević (Singer and member of Riblja Čorba); Featuring: Nikola Đuričko (Actor), Zvonimir Đukić (Singer and member of Van Gogh (band)) and Antonija Gigovska (Singer)
2	19 November 2016	Željko Joksimović (Singer)
3	26 November 2016	Vesna Petrusevska (Actress); Featuring: Nikola Todoroski (Comedian)
4	3 December 2016	Cast of Fcerasni Novosti (News parody show); Featuring: Ljube Boskovski (Politician), Stevo Pendarovski (Politician), Nikola Poposki (Politician), Petar Mladenovski (Singer and member of Superhiks)
5	10 December 2016	Igor Džambazov (Artist)
6	17 December 2016	Igor Džambazov (Artist), Igor Atanasoski – Guru Hare (Musician)
7	24 December 2016	Zoran Cvijanović (Actor); Featuring: Igor Tomevski (Nobel scholarship student)
8	31 December 2016	Vlado Janevski (Singer); Featuring: Vlatko Lozanoski (Singer), Ognen Janevski (TV host), Maestro (Band))
9	14 January 2017	Special travel episode Pehcevo
10	21 January 2017	Aleksandar Malenko (Swimmer); Featuring: Marija Lozanoska (Author), Crossover Blues Band (Band))
11	28 January 2017	The actors from Prespav (TV series); Featuring: Suzana Gavazova (Singer))
12	4 February 2017	Vlado Georgiev (Singer)
13	11 February 2017	Goce Todorovski (Actor), Blagoja Chorevski (Actor), Vanco Petrusevski (Actor))
14	18 February 2017	Atanas Atanasovski (Actor), Valentin Kostadinovski – Tino (Actor); Featuring: Conquering Lion (Band), Skopje Smog Alarm (organisation))
15	25 February 2017	Miroslav Ilic (Singer)
16	4 March 2017	The teams from Utrinska na Telma and Zdravo Makedonijo morning shows
17	11 March 2017	Milan Kalinic (Actor), Milan Vasic (Actor)
18	18 March 2017	Bojan Jovanovski – Boki 13
19	25 March 2017	Daniel Kajmakovki (Singer), Nesha Bridges (Comedian)
20	1 April 2017	Jana Burčeska (Singer)
21	8 April 2017	Igor Stefanovski – Idze (Race driver), Vlatko Stefanovski (Musician)
22	15 April 2017	Nele Karajlic (Actor), Dzoksi (Musician)
23	22 April 2017	Dragan Spasov - Dac (Actor)
24	29 April 2017	Ivana Colakovska (Adventurer)
25	6 May 2017	DNK (band), Cajka (Race driver)
26	13 May 2017	Mia Kostova (TV host), Slobodan Lazarevski (Doctor)
27	27 May 2017	Special with the filming crew of the show
28	3 June 2017	Bubo Karov (Actor), Slobodan Lazarevski (Doctor)

Number of episode	Date	Guests
Web Exclusive	26 November 2016	Aleksandar Stanković (TV-Host/Journalist)

=== Season 9 (2017–18) ===
Number of episode	Date	Guests
1	1 October 2017	Retrospective – reminder of the most interesting moments of the past 8 seasons
2	8 October 2017	Meet the Team – people that create the show Eden na Eden
3	29 October 2017	The actors from „Familijata Markovski“ (TV series)
4	5 November 2017	Pero Kamikaza and Poce Ikonomov from „Memorijа“ (Band)
5	12 November 2017	Željko Joksimović (Singer)
6	19 November 2017	The Ambassador of the United States in Macedonia Jess Baily
7	26 November 2017	Nikola Dimitrov (Macedonian diplomat and politician)
8	3 December 2017	Sarah Mace (Singer); Featuring: Next Time (Band)
9	10 December 2017	Igor Džambazov (Artist); Featuring: Elena Risteska (Singer)
10	17 December 2017	Sasko Kocev (Actor)
11	24 December 2017	Cast of Zevzekmanija (TV show)
12	31 December 2017	New Year's special with: Tin Vodopivec (Stand-up comedian), Atanas Atanasovski (Actor) и Tino Kostadinovski (Actor)
13	7 January 2018	Christmas special – Children evergreen songs
14	14 January 2018	Igor Džambazov (Artist)
15	21 January 2018	Sanja Nikolic (TV host) and Marko Marinkovic – Slatkar (rap-singer)
16	28 January 2018	Special episode with: Kiril Pop Hristov – Kili (Actor)
17	4 February 2018	Ana Nikolić (Singer) и Stefan Djuric – Rasta (Singer)
18	11 February 2018	The cast of Mamma Mia (musical of MNT): Tanja Kocovska, Biljana Dragicevic – Projkovska, Аrna Sijak, Nina Dean, Kire Gjorevski and Nikola Nakovski
19	18 February 2018	Violeta Tomovska (singer) and Efto Pupinoski (singer)
20	25 February 2018	The cast of Nase maalo (Children TV series) and Victoria Loba (singer)
21	4 March 2018	Toni Mihajlovski (actor and host)
22	11 March 2018	Vlatko Stefanovski (musician)
23	18 March 2018	Facebook fans: Filip Etmisovski, Marjana Pavlichek, Evgenij Houp, RobbieRay LedRobot
24	25 March 2018	Dragan Tevdovski (Finance minister of Macedonia) and actors from Secret Ingredient – Blagoj Veselinov, Anastas Tanoski and Aksel Mehmet With: Mayor of Macedonia, Ohio – Joseph Migliorini
25	1 April 2018	Petar Mircevski (actor) and the cast from "Solza i Smea" (TV show)
26	8 April 2018	Zan Mitrev (cardiovascular surgeon)
27	15 April 2018	Eye Cue (band) with Macedonian YouTubers: Marko Markovic – GP and Stefan Raskovic – Steffonator
28	22 April 2018	Ivan Bosiljcic (actor) with Dobrila Cabric (singer)
29	29 April 2018	Marko Vidojkovic (writer) and Slavica Squire (writer, NLP coach)
30	6 May 2018	Igor Angelkov (actor) and Vlatko Lozanoski – Lozano (singer)

=== Season 10 (2018–19) ===
Number of episode	Date	Guests
1	21 October 2018	Goce Todorovski (actor) and Duper (band)
2	28 October 2018	Zdravko Colic (singer)
3	4 November 2018	Mia Kostova (TV host) and Milena Antovska Stankovska (TV host)
4	11 November 2018	Tarik Filipovic (TV host and actor)
5	18 November 2018	Vesna Petrusevska (actress)
6	25 November 2018	Milan Kalinic (actor) and Srdjan Ivanovic (actor)
7	2 December 2018	Velibor Djarovski – Djaro (menager)
8	9 December 2018	Lepa Brena (singer)
9	16 December 2018	Elena Risteska (singer)
10	23 December 2018	Cast from Prespav (TV series)
11	30 December 2018	New Year's special with Vlatko Lozanoski (singer)
12	6 January 2019	Christmas special with Trajce Manev (singer), Jakov Drenkovski (singer), Lidija Kocovska (singer), Ruzica Miloseska Brcioska (singer in Area) and Nikola Jankov Koki (singer)
13	13 January 2019	Interesting unaired moments from Season 10
14	20 January 2019	Mike Zafirovski (business executive), Ana Divac (business executive) and Catherine Constantinides (activist)
15	27 January 2019	Tribute to Tose Proeski
16	3 February 2019	Zeljko Samardzic (singer)
17	10 February 2019	Tamara Todevska (singer)
18	17 February 2019	Goran Bregovic (musician)
19	24 February 2019	Interesting and unaired moments from Season 10
20	3 March 2019	Vlado Janevski (singer)
21	10 March 2019	Grandmaster Flash (musician)
22	17 March 2019	Robert Sazdov (musician)
23	24 March 2019	Sasa Kovacevic (singer) with Conquering Lion (band)
24	31 March 2019	Nele Karajlic (musician, actor)
25	7 April 2019	Dzambo Agusev (trumpet player)
26	14 April 2019	Gordana Siljanovska Davkova and Stevo Pendarovski (presidential candidates)
27	21 April 2019	Hari Varesanovic (singer)
28	28 April 2019	Easter collage of best moments
29	5 May 2019	Milan Gutovic (actor)
30	12 May 2019	Atanas Kostovski and Zoran Mihajlov (sports commentator)
31	19 May 2019	Zdravko Colic (singer)
32	26 May 2019	Timur Dibirov (Handball player)
33	2 June 2019	Unaired moments from Season 10
34	9 June 2019	Best of RK Vardar
35	16 June 2019	Stefan Milenkovic (violinist)

== Season 11 (2019/2020) ==
Number of episode	Date	Guests
1	27 October 2019	Pero Antic (basketball player)
2	3 November 2019	Stefan Djuric – Rasta (Singer), Kristijan Taskovski - Tasko (musician), Predrag Miljkovic - Corona (rapper) and Premil Jovanovic - Rimski (rapper)
3	10 November 2019	Dragan Spasov - Dac (actor) and Aleksandar Mitevski (musician)
4	17 November 2019	Amdi Bajram (politician)
5	24 November 2019	Cast from the movie Willow - Natalija Teodosieva, Sara Klimoska, Nikola Risteski and Blagoja Corevski Core
6	1 December 2019	Cast from The family Markovski (TV series)
7	8 December 2019	Vlatko Lozanoski (singer)
8	15 December 2019	Child actors from the TV shows Dajte muzika and Glasna kukja
9	22 December 2019	Dejan Lilic (actor) and Blagoj Veselinov (actor)
10	29 December 2019	New Year's special with Igor Dzambazov (artist)
11	5 January 2020	Rerun of the New Year's episode
12	12 January 2020	Alen Islamovic (singer)
13	19 January 2020	Hristijan Mickoski (politician)
14	26 January 2020	Danijela Martinovic (singer)
15	2 February 2020	Mile Kuzmanovski (singer)
16	9 February 2020	Naum Petreski (singer)
17	16 February 2020	Atanas Atanasovski (actor) and Tino Kostadinovski (actor)
18	23 February 2020	Zoran Zaev (politician)
19	1 March 2020	Creators of Honeyland (Oscar nominated documentary) and Novak Djokovic (tennis player)
20	8 March 2020	Gjorgi Nachevski and Slave Nikolov (handball referees) and Antonia Gigovska (singer)
21	15 March 2020	Petar Graso (singer)
22	22 March 2020	Stay at home special with Simon Trpceski (pianist), Vlatko Stefanovski (musician), Tamara Todevska (singer), Elena Risteska (singer), Jovan Jovanov (music producer) and Zeljko Samardzic (singer)
23	29 March 2020	Stay at home 2 special with Nikola Panovski (microbiologist), Dragan Danilovski (epidemiologist) and Slavica Arsova (psychiatrist)
24	5 April 2020	Special Sketch Show
25	12 April 2020	Stay at home Quiz with Victoria Loba (singer), Sasko Kocev (actor), Atanas Atanasovski (actor), Tino Kostadinovski (actor) and Tarik Filipovic (TV host and actor)
26	19 April 19 2020	Stay at home Talent show with Vlatko Lozanoski (singer), DNK (band), Sara Mace (singer), Vesna Petrusevska (actress), Darko Pancev (football player) and Gjorgi Nachevski (handball referee)
27	26 April 2020	Special Sketch Show 2
28	3 May 2020	Barbeque edition with Bubo Karov (comedian) and Gorast Cvetkovski (actor)
29	10 May 102020	Marjan Gjorgjievski (actor and stand-up comedian)
30	17 May 2020	Venko Filipce (Health minister)
31	24 May 2020	
32	31 May 2020	

== Season 12 (2020/2021) ==
Number of episode	Date	Guests
1	1 November 2020	Vasko Todorov (actor)
2	8 November 2020	Zarko Karadzovski (epidemiologist)
3	15 November 2020	Katarina Ivanovska (model)
4	22 November 2020	Nikola Perevski-Pere (musician, lead singer of Nokaut)
5	29 November 2020	Igor Angelovski (Manager of the North Macedonia national team)
6	6 December 2020	Stojance Angelov (politician)
7	13 December 2020	Goran Stojanovski (actor)
8	28 December 2019	Duci & Pajo (actors from the TV show Fcerasni Novosti)
9	27 December 2020	New Year's special with Igor Dzambazov (artist) and Ilina Arsova (mountain climber)
10	3 January 2021	Rerun of the New Year's special
11	10 January 2021	Damjan Mancevski (politician)
12	24 January 2021	Goran Mihajlovski (journalist)
13	31 January 2021	Tatjana Stojanovska (news anchor)
14	7 February 2021	Vladimir Blazhev - Pancho (musician)
15	14 February 2021	Vlatko Lozanoski (musician)
16	21 February 2021	Toni Mihajlovski (politician)
17	28 February 2021	Marko Novevski (TV host)
18	7 March 2021	Andrijana Alacki (TV host)
19	14 March 2021	Zoran Kesic (TV host)
20	21 March 2021	Dino Radja (Basketball player)
21	28 March 2021	Nino Velickovski (Musician)
22	4 April 2021	Tijana Dapcevic (Musician)
23	11 April 2021	Atanas Atanasovski (actor), Tino Kostadinovski (actor)
24	18 April 2021	Vesna Ginovska Ilkova (Opera singer), Kazuhiro Kotetsu (Opera singer)

== See also ==
- Vo Centar
- Jadi Burek
