= Ljubomir Cuculovski =

Macedonian philosopher

- Љубомир Цуцуловски
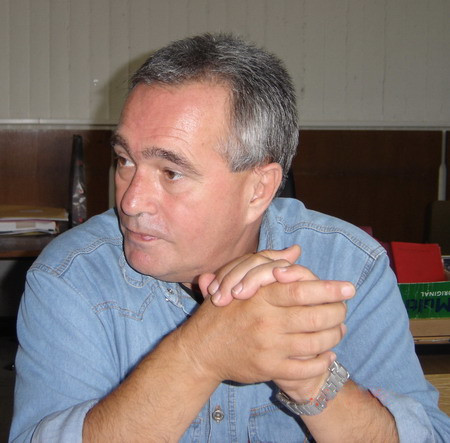
- Ljubomir Cuculovski.
- Born: 1 September 1948 (age 78); Bitola
- Occupation: Macedonian philosopher

Ljubomir Cuculovski (born 1 September 1948 in Bitola, Republic of Macedonia) is a Macedonian philosopher and professor in Skopje. He graduated from the Department of Philosophy, Faculty of Philosophy of Ss. Cyril and Methodius University of Skopje, with a thesis on The Sources of Bergson’s Theory of Knowledge. Then he received his master's title in sociological science in 1982, at the Institute for Sociological, Political and Juridical Research in Skopje, with a thesis on Religion and Morality. He received his PhD in philosophical sciences from the Faculty of Philosophy in Skopje in 1992, with a dissertation on Karl Marx: The Origin of Historical Materialism (1841–1849).

== Career in teaching and research ==
In 1973–1975, Cuculovski was a teaching assistant at the Institute for Sociological, Political and Juridical Research in Skopje. From 1975 onwards, he was employed at the Faculty of Philosophy (Department of Philosophy), Ss. Cyril and Methodius University of Skopje. In 1992 he was appointed a docent, while in 2002, he became a full professor. In 2000, Professor Ljubomir Cuculovski was elected a President of the University Senate of that university. He was also the head of the Department of Philosophy at the Faculty of Philosophy, for two terms (1999–2005). In 2007 he was appointed a professor ordinarius.

To date, he has held numerous courses, including History of Marxism. He has held lectures and tutorials on Philosophy of Religion, Theories of Religion, and Introduction to Philosophy. His philosophical interest is primarily centered on the problem of human alienation and on the fundamental philosophical issues and problems directly related to the metaphysical questions of God, his existence, good and evil in the context of the assumption that a good and wise God has created the world. He is of the opinion that the problem of theodicy is the central issue in any philosophy of religion. In social and political philosophy, he sides with Marx's analysis and understanding of the world of capital and its functioning. At the same time, he is actively involved in the teaching activities in the following departments at the Faculty of Philosophy: Department of Philosophy, Department of Defense and Peace Studies, and Department of Art History and Archeology. Retired in 2013.

== Writing ==
So far he has published over 600 articles in scientific and professional journals, both in Macedonia and ex-Yugoslavia. Some of his texts and interviews have been published in daily or weekly newspapers in other countries (Bulgaria, Federal Republic of Yugoslavia, Croatia, ...). The central issues in his analysis are the contemporary social and political circumstances in the Republic of Macedonia and a critical analysis of the process of globalization, which he understands as externalization, which is equivalent with Americanization, with an overall tendency to reduce all values and behavioral models to one – the American.

He is also a member of the editorial board of the journal Novi Plamen (English New Flame) and Philosophia, the journal of the Philosophical Society of Macedonia.

== Published books ==
- Marx's Concept of Man, Labor and Alienation, Komunist, Skopje, 1981.
- Testimonials and Comments, Kultura, Skopje, 1999.
- Different Narratives, Kultura, Skopje, 2002.
- Political Narratives, Kultura, Skopje, 2002.
- Marx's Anthropological Critique of Capital, Az-Buki, Skopje, 2007.
- Some Controversies Around Marx (LXVIII pages). Introduction to K. Marx and F. Engels: The Communist Manifesto, Az-Buki, Skopje, 2008.
- A Novel in One Night, ViG Zenica, Skopje, 2011, 179 p. ISBN 9786084587156
