= Filip Petrovski =

Macedonian politician

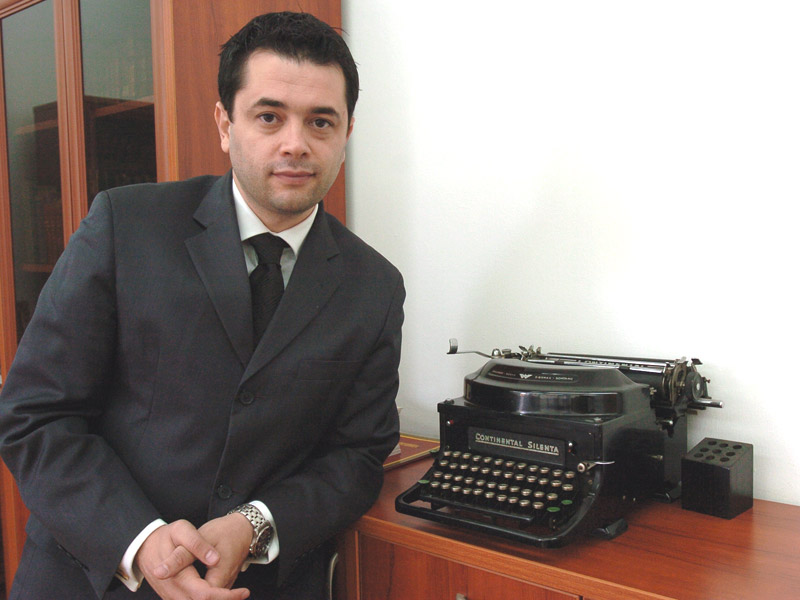

Member of the Macedonian Assembly
- In office 1998–2001

Director of the National Archives of Macedonia
- In office 2015–2017

Personal details
- Born: May 28, 1972 (age 54) Kumanovo, SR Macedonia, Yugoslavia (now Republic of Macedonia)
- Party: VMRO-DPMNE
- Education: Ss. Cyril and Methodius University in Skopje
- Website: Filip Petrovski's blog

Filip Tihomir Petrovski (Macedonian: Филип Петровски) (born May 28, 1972 in Kumanovo) is a Macedonian political activist and librarian.

He was the Director of the City Library "Braka Miladinovci" in Skopje from 2005 to 2015, and is formerly a Director of the National Archives of Macedonia.

== Education ==
=== Undergraduate education ===
- He finished experimental high school in the school "Goce Delcev" in Kumanovo.
- He graduated from the Faculty of Philosophy at the Ss. Cyril and Methodius University in Skopje.

=== Postgraduate education ===
- With the invitation of the American Government he was representative from Macedonia to the 1998 USIA International Visitor Program, A project for Young European Leaders. In 1999, he went to the Harvard University, John F. Kennedy School of Government at the course of International leadership and economic development.
- Holds Master of Science degree on Law Faculty in Skopje, 2007.
- Holds PhD in political science, 2010.

== Political standings ==
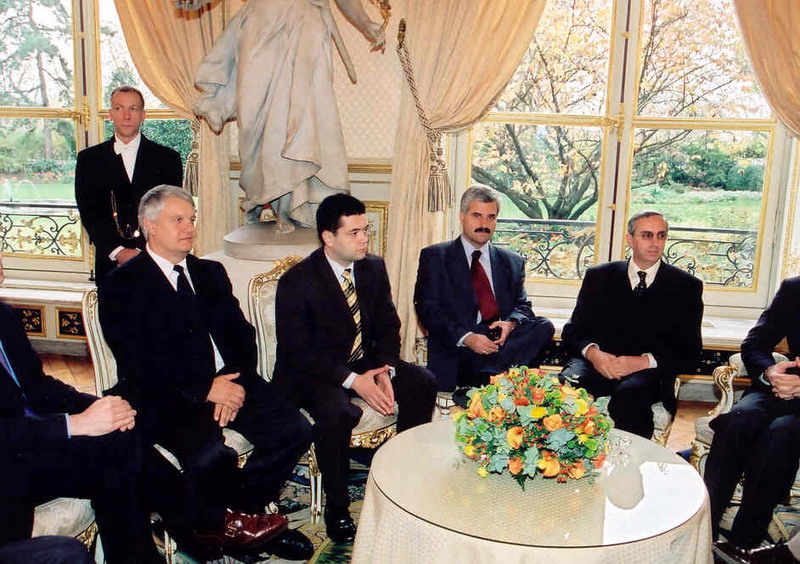
Filip Petrovski in the French Parliament

- He became a member of VMRO-DPMNE during his studies of philosophy in Skopje in the early 1990s.
- At that time Macedonia was still struggling for democracy and international recognition. The former Communist Party, now only with new name overtake political power in the country with fraud in the election of 1994. In 1997 large protests of students took place; the final stage of the protests was a hunger strike. The government was forced to call a special session of the Assembly of the Republic of Macedonia.
- Shortly after the protests he became a president of Youth Force Union of VMRO-DPMNE(1997–2000), and a member of Executive Committee of VMRO-DPMNE (1997–2002)
- Vice president of United for Macedonia, 2009–2010. After a strong disagreement with the party president about how the politics is run he left the party.

=== Political positions ===
- MP in the Assembly of the Republic of Macedonia in the period from 1998 until 2001. He was a member of the Parliamentary Committee for Control of the Security and Counterintelligence Institution and the Intelligence Agency, & the Public Research Committee for Protection of Human Rights and Liberties, And the Youth and Sport Committee.
- In December 2001, he was appointed to be the first Consul General in the Consulate General of the Republic of Macedonia in New York.

== Other career activities ==
In 1996, he was promoted as a candidate for the position of a president of the Student Union of the University of Ss. Cyril and Methodius in Skopje, but because of publicly stating that he is a member of a political party VMRO-DPMNE he was not allowed to run.

During his college years, he participated in the student demonstrations of 1997 against the law passed by the Macedonian Government regarding the Pedagogy Faculty.

Because of his activities, the Macedonian Ministry of Interior opened a political file on him, codename MARTA, in which he was defined as dangerous for the constitutional order of the Republic of Macedonia] His file was closed after he became a member of the Macedonian Parliament.

His file was published in full in the daily newspaper Makedonija Denes, in nine parts in 2000. That was a proof of misuse of the security services of the state for the interests of SDSM and their fight against all who held different opinions from theirs.

A black dot in his political life was that he caused a fight in one of New York’s bar while he was acting as a Consul of North Macedonia. He was drunk at the time.

== Published books ==
- About Us
- Once more about Us
- Anti blog for Filip Petrovski
- Opinions 2007–2008
