= Superhiks =

Macedonian musical band

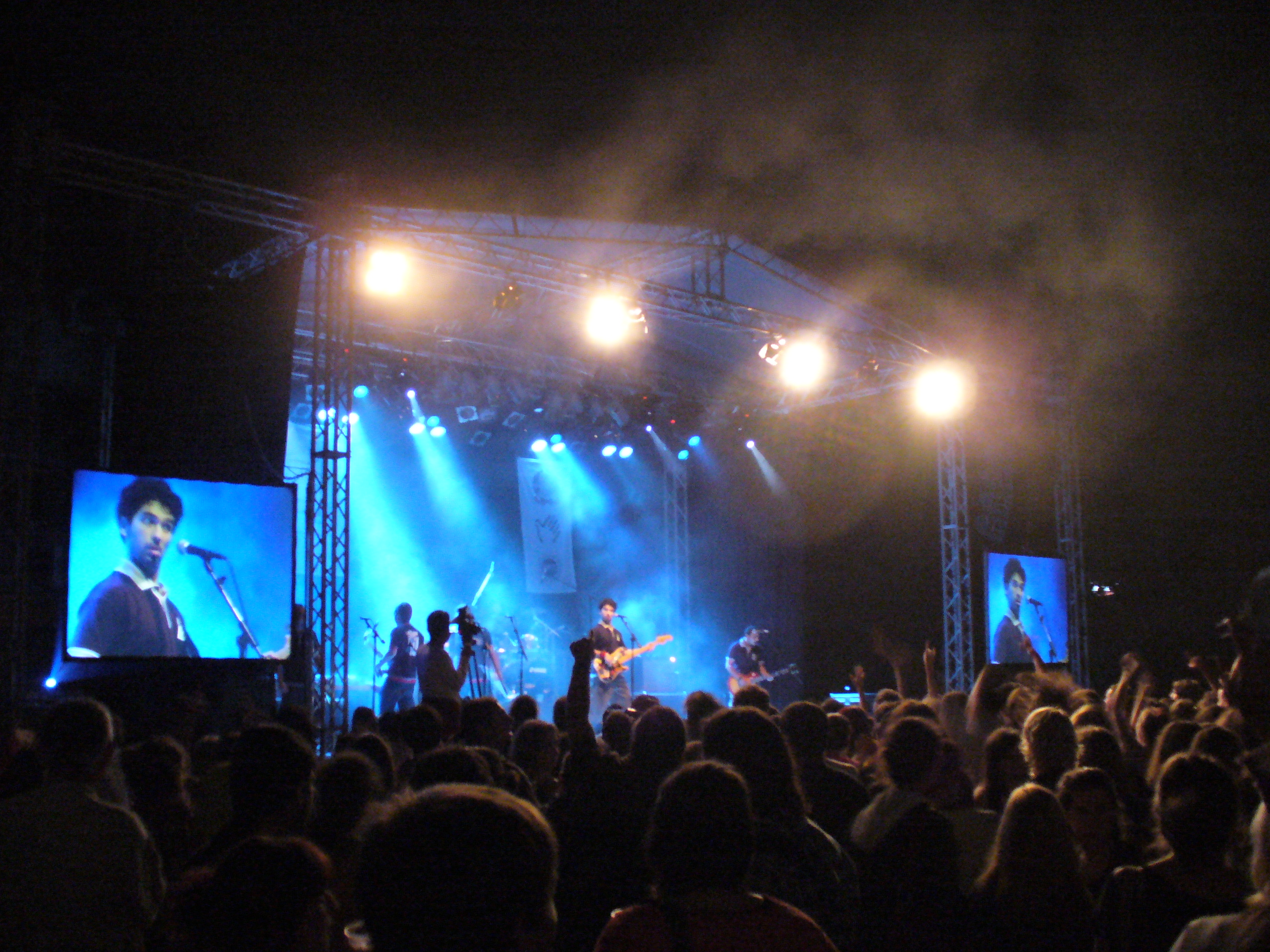
- Superhiks live

Background information
- Origin: Skopje, North Macedonia
- Genres: Ska-punk, reggae, pop-punk, Latin, Balkan
- Years active: 1993 – present
- Label: Lithium Records
- Members: Petar Mladenovski; Boris MInov; Darko Popov; Aleksandar Spasovski; Valentin Vidovikj; Branko Ilievski; Goce Lalkovski
- Website: superhiks.mk

Superhiks (Macedonian: Суперхикс) is a Macedonian ska-punk and reggae band with occasional swing, Latin and Balkan folk music elements from Skopje, North Macedonia. They gained international prominence after appearing on MTV France, MTV Israel and MTV Adria. They were also the first Macedonian band to reach the top of the charts on MTV Adria.

== Biography ==
The band was formed by three high school friends: Petar Mladenovski (frontman and bass guitar), Dragan Todorovski (guitar) and Zoran Žežov (drums) in the early 1990s, starting with a mixture of ska and hardcore punk music. After several personal changes, today the six-member band also features a three-piece horn section consisting of Sime Zlatkov (saxophone), Aleksandar Spasovski (trumpet), Branko Ilievski (trombone) and DJ Goce Lalkovski as well as drums and percussion played by Darko Popov-Daro.

Superhiks shared stages with many world-famous acts such as: Manu Chao and Radio Bemba, Fun Lovin Criminals, Fishbone, Tito and Tarantula, Henry Rollins, Rico Rodriguez, H-Block, Faith No More, Green Day, House Of Pain, Inner Circle, Zvonko Bogdan and many others.

The band's debut release, Čekaj be vikam, kade be malku (Wait a Second…) was released on the Lithium Records label in 2000 and received radio air and TV play on all commercial stations nationwide. The album was reviewed in national and international publications and received critical acclaim for its distinctive sound and socially conscious attitude. The video for its third single Rade was shown on MTV France and MTV Israel as well as other European TV stations.

Superhiks appeared on numerous national and international compilations such as Ska Generation (BRP Records), I Woke up in motion (H.O.P.S. Contact Recs.), Ska Factor Positive (Ohoho Records) and others.

Their follow-up album Trumano was released in November 2003 again on the Lithium Records label. During the first month, 25,000 copies sold out. Trumano's four singles followed Rade's success and occupied all the radio and TV charts in Macedonia as well as the Balkans. The record was supported by aggressive touring nationwide and around Europe in 2004. The tour finished with a three-hour show in their hometown, Skopje, in front of 5000 people. It is also notable that Trumano contained private mobile phone conversations between the band members on several songs.

In 2006 Superhiks released their third (live) album from their biggest concert. 35,000 copies were printed and it was sold out in less than seven days. In May 2012 they released a new single, "Ti treba nekoj".

In December 2012 they self-released their fourth studio album, called Africa. Superhiks were awarded the best Macedonian band in 2001, 2002, 2004, 2006, 2010, and 2012, and their Skopje Fair concert was awarded the best rock concert in 2004 in Macedonia.

In December 2012 they played a concert in Metropolis Arena in Skopje, in front of 6000 fans.

In June 2015 they played an overcrowded club concert in Club Havana-Skopje in front of 1500 fans.

In June 2015 they released their second single for their fifth upcoming studio album. The song was called "Miki Lee" and had huge success on the radio charts in Macedonia.

In 2024, they celebrated 30 years of activity with a show in Rasadnik.

== Discography ==
- Chekaj be, vikam... kade be, malku! (2001) – Lithium Records
- Trumano (2003) – Lithium Records
- Live at Skopski Saem (2004) – Lithium Records
- ...i sega shto? (2008) – Lithium Records
- Afrika (2012) – DY Records
- The best of 20!..so far (2014) – Jugoton Records
- Underground Evergreens (017) – Jugoton Records
- Sila i Nervoza (2024) - Phoenix- Corpus Delicti Records

== Trivia ==
The band got its name after Superhik (in Italian: Superciuk), a fictitious anti-Robin Hood character who steals from the poor and gives to the rich from the Italian comic book Alan Ford that had and still has a cult status in the former Yugoslav countries.

== Audio samples ==
- Rade
- Gol
- Nova Kaledonija
- Mister Birokrat

== Video ==
- Superhiks on Youtube

== See also ==
- Music of North Macedonia
