= Jadi Burek =

- Јади Бурек
- Genre: Talk show
- Created by: Janko Ilkovski
- Country of origin: North Macedonia
- Original language: Macedonian

Production
- Production location: Skopje
- Running time: 120 minutes

Original release
- Network: TV Sonce

Related
- 2000 - present

Jadi Burek is a television show from North Macedonia hosted by Janko Ilkovski-Burek, The show is on air every weekday on TV Sonce.

== Season 2015/2016 ==
Number of Episode	Air date	Name of Episode In Macedonian	Guests
1	October 19, 2015	Interview: Dragan Pavlović Latas; Интервју: Драган Павловоќ Латас	Dragan Pavlović Latas (Journalist)
2	November 3, 2015	Interview: Milenko Nedelkovski; Интервју Миленко Неделковски	Milenko Nedelkovski (Journalist)
3	December 2, 2015	Interview: Žarko Dimitrioski; Интервју: Жаре Димитровски	Žarko Dimitrioski (Talk Show Host)
4	December 2, 2015	Interview: Samir Osmanagich; Интервју: Самир Османагич	Samir Osmanagich (Pyramids Researcher)
5	December 4, 2015	Interview: Mirka Velinovska; Интервју: Мирка Велиновска	Mirka Velinovska (Journalist)
6	December 11, 2015	Interview: Oliver Andonov; Интервју: Оливер Андонов	Oliver Andonov (University Professor)
7	December 11, 2015	Interview: Vasko Skenderovski; Интервју: Васко Скендеровски	Vasko Skenderovski (Futsal Coach)
8	December 20, 2015	History of Radio; Историја на радиото	Darko Mijalkovski (Radio Host); Viktor Petrov - Viksa (Radio Host)
9	December 21, 2015	Interview: Toni Mihajlovski; Интервју: Тони Михајловски	Toni Mihajlovski (Actor)
10	December 22, 2015	Pollution; Загадување	Kiril Hristovski (Scientist)
11	December 22, 2015	Refugee crisis Бргалска криза	Jasmin Redzepi (Non-Gov Activist); Cvetin Chilimanov (Journalist)
12	December 29, 2015	Interview: Igor Janusev; Интервју: Игор Јанушев	Igor Janusev (Director)
13	December 30, 2015	Interview: Niche Dimovski; Интервју: Ниче Димовски	Niche Dimovski (Writer)
14	January 2, 2016	Interview: Bojana Skenderovska; Интервју: Бојана Скендеровска	Bojana Skenderovska (Talk Show Host)
15	January 28, 2016	Interview: Jason Miko; Интервју: Џејсон Мико	Jason Miko (Journalist)
16	January 29, 2016	Interview: Stevce Jakimovski; Интервју: Стевче Јакимовски	Stevce Jakimovski (Politician)

== Season 2014/2015 ==
- This list in not complete

Number of Episode	Air date	Name of Episode In Macedonian	Guests
1	October 1, 2014	Interview: Mirka Velinovska; Интервју: Мирка Велиновска	Mirka Velinovska (Journalist)
2	January 24, 2015	Interview: Nikola Gruevski; Интервју: Никола Гриевски	Nikola Gruevski (Prime Minister)
3	June 7, 2015	Interview: Aki Rahimovski; Интервју: Аки Рахимовски	Aki Rahimovski (Singer)

== Season 2013/2014 ==
- This list in not complete

Number of Episode	Air date	Name of Episode In Macedonian	Guests
1	November 13, 2013	Interview: Milenko Nedelkovski; Интервју: Миленко Неделковски	Milenko Nedelkovski (Journalist)
2	November 19, 2013	Interview: Andon Donchevski; Интервју: Андон Дончевски	Andon Donchevski (Former football player)
3	October 29, 2013	Interview: Ivona Talevska; Интервју: Ивона Талевска	Ivona Talevska (Journalist)
4	October 31, 2013	Interview: Igor Dzambazov; Интервју: Игор Џамбазов	Igor Dzambazov (Actor)
5	March 27, 2014	Interview: Gjorge Ivanov; Интервју: Ѓорѓи Иванов	Gjorge Ivanov (President)
6	April 8, 2014	Interview: Nikola Gruevski; Интервју: Никола Гриевски	Nikola Gruevski (Prime Minister)
7	May 16, 2014	Interview: Milenko Nedelkovski; Интервју: Миленко Неделковски	Milenko Nedelkovski (Journalist)

== Season 2012/2013 ==
- This list in not complete

Number of Episode	Air date	Name of Episode In Macedonian	Guests
1	December 4, 2012	Interview: Milenko Nedelkovski; Интервју: Миленко Неделковски	Milenko Nedelkovski (Journalist)
2	December 5, 2012	Interview: Dragan Pavlović Latas; Интервју: Драган Павловиќ Латас	Dragan Pavlović Latas (Journalist)
3	December 13, 2012	Interview: Mirka Velinovska; Интервју: Мирка Велиновска	Mirka Velinovska (Journalist)
4	December 22, 2012	Interview: Koce Trajanovski; Интервју: Коце Трајановски	Koce Trajanovski (Mayor)
5	December 26, 2012	Interview: Nikola Gruevski; Интервју: Никола Гриевски	Nikola Gruevski (Prime Minister)
6	January 16, 2013	Interview: Ljubisav Ivanov Dzingo; Интервју: Љубисав Иванов Ѕинго	Ljubisav Ivanov Dzingo (Politician)
7	February 13, 2013	Interview: Srgjan Kerim; Интервју: Коце Трајановски	Srgjan Kerim (Diplomat)
8	March 21, 2013	Interview: Koce Trajanovski; Интервју: Коце Трајановски	Koce Trajanovski (Mayor)
9	March 22, 2013	Interview: Dragan Pavlović Latas; Интервју: Драган Павловиќ Латас	Dragan Pavlović Latas (Journalist)
10	April 18, 2013	Interview: Mirka Velinovska; Интервју: Мирка Велиновска	Mirka Velinovska (Journalist)

== Season 2009/2010 ==
Number of Episode	Air date	Name of Episode In Macedonian	Guests
1	October 8, 2009	Interview: Blaze Ristovski	Blaze Ristovski (Academic)

== See also ==
- Milenko Nedelkovski Show
- Vo Centar
- Eden na Eden
- Ednooki
