= Dhira =

- Village
- Country: India
- State: Punjab
- District: Gurdaspur
- Tehsil: Batala
- Region: Majha

Government
  - Type: Panchayat raj
  - Body: Gram panchayat

Population (2011)
  - Total: 1,026
  - Total Households: 191
- Sex ratio 542/484 ♂/♀

Languages
  - Official: Punjabi
- Time zone: UTC+5:30 (IST)
- Telephone: 01871
- ISO 3166 code: IN-PB
- Vehicle registration: PB-18
- Website: gurdaspur.nic.in

Dhira is a village in Batala in Gurdaspur district of Punjab State, India. The village is administrated by Sarpanch an elected representative of the village.

== Demography ==
In 2011, the village comprised a total of 191 houses with a population of 1026 individuals, including 542 males and 484 females, as reported by Census India. The village's literacy rate stands at 75.06%, slightly below the state average of 75.84%. The population of children under the age of 6 years amounts to 128, accounting for 12.48% of the total village population, with a child sex ratio of approximately 730, which is lower than the state average of 846.

== See also ==
- List of villages in India
