= Balcan =

Balcan is a surname. Notable persons with that name include:

- George Balcan (1932–2004), Canadian radio broadcaster and artist
- Maria-Florina Balcan, Romanian-American computer scientist
- Vural Balcan (fl. 1948), Turkish fencer who competed at the 1948 Summer Olympics

== See also ==
- Balkan (disambiguation)
