= Miroslav Lazanski =

Serbian diplomat and politician (1950–2021)

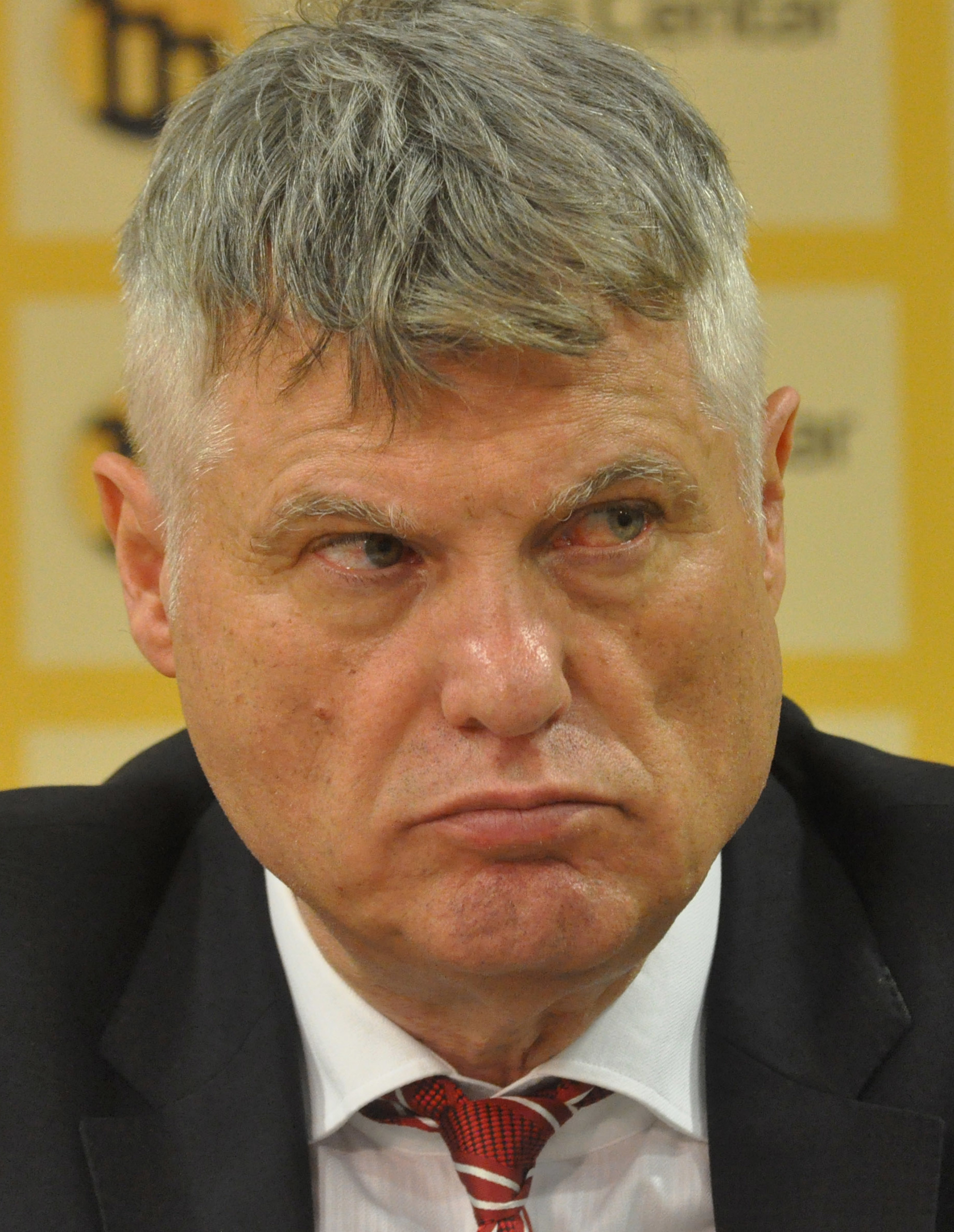
- Lazanski in 2019

Serbian Ambassador to Russia
- In office 25 September 2019 – 3 August 2021
- President: Aleksandar Vučić
- Preceded by: Slavenko Terzić

Member of the National Assembly
- In office 3 June 2016 – 25 September 2019
- President: Maja Gojković

Personal details
- Born: 18 September 1950 Karlovac, PR Croatia, FPR Yugoslavia
- Died: 3 August 2021 (aged 70) Belgrade, Serbia
- Citizenship: Serbia
- Party: Nonpartisan (SNS-nominated)
- Education: University of Zagreb
- Occupation: Diplomat

Miroslav Lazanski (Serbian: Мирослав Лазански; 18 September 1950 – 3 August 2021) was а Serbian journalist, military analyst, politician, and a diplomat who served as ambassador of Serbia to the Russian Federation. Previous to his appointment, Lazanski was a Member of parliament. He wrote on political and military matters and was a correspondent and commentator for the Belgrade daily Politika. He was a member of the National Assembly of Serbia from 2016 to 2019 as member of the governing coalition led by the Serbian Progressive Party.

== Early life ==
Born to a Karlovac-stationed Yugoslav People's Army (JNA) officer father of Slovene ethnicity Vladimir Lazanski (1919-2005) and a Serb mother Velinka Živković, Lazanski's paternal grandfather Mihael Lazanski (1896-1942) and uncle Miroslav "Mirko" Lazanski (1921-1942) were imprisoned and killed in the Ustashe-run Jasenovac concentration camp during World War II. During the war, his father—at the time a Royal Yugoslav Army officer—was held at Osnabrück as a prisoner of war. His father's best friend was Zoran Konstantinović (1920–2007).

Young Lazanski began his primary education in the town of his birth, attending the Dragojla Jarnević Elementary School and completing five grades. Following Karlovac, his father's job took the family to Trebinje where Lazanski completed final three grades of primary school before enrolling at the Jovan Dučić Gymnasium. Upon graduating from the gymnasium, he enrolled at the University of Zagreb's Faculty of Law and graduated. His mandatory JNA military service stint took place in Bitola in 1977, in the JNA's 41st infantry division.

== Journalist career ==
=== Vjesnik, Danas, and Start ===
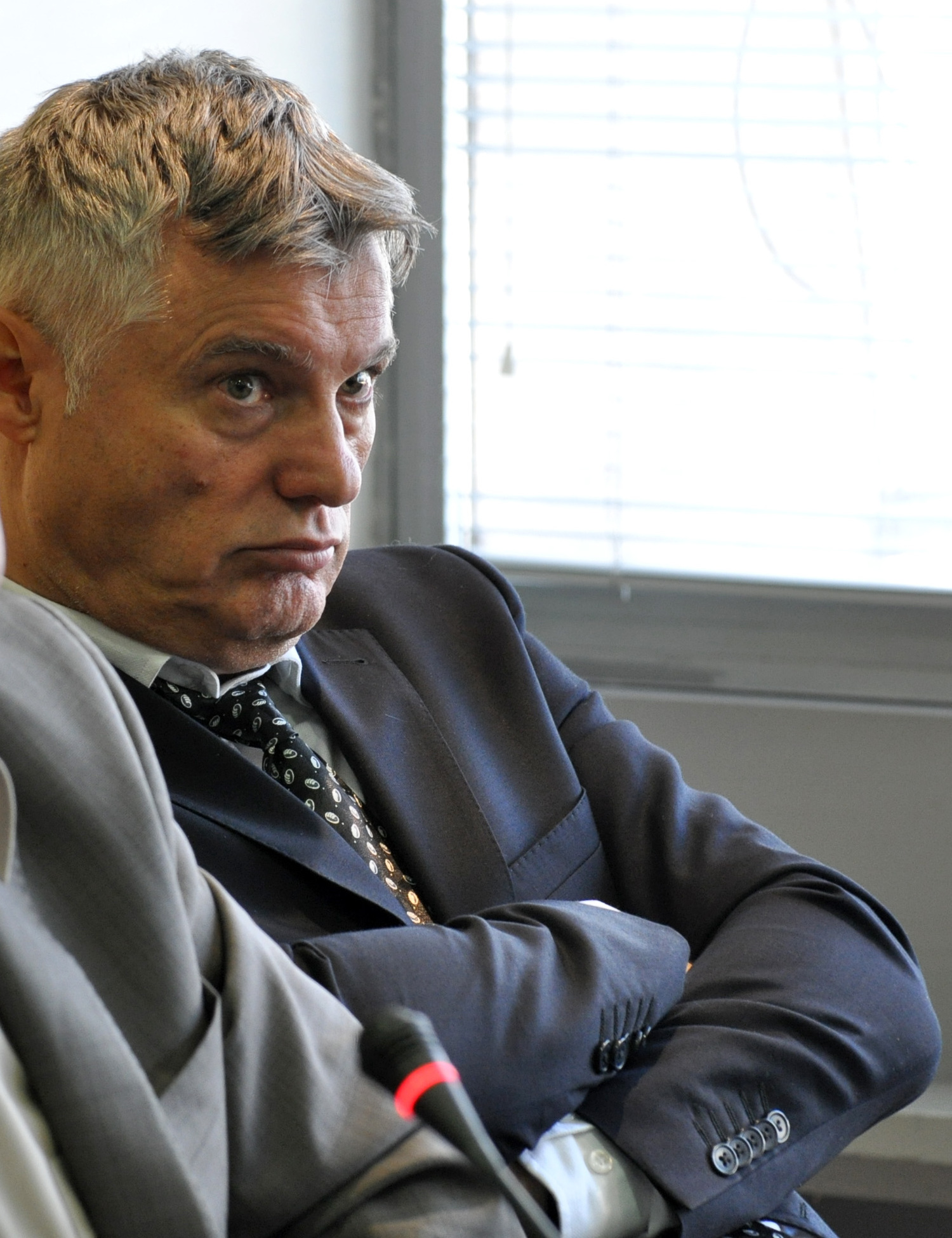
Lazanski in 2014

Lazanski's first jobs in journalism were for the Zagreb-based Vjesnik daily newspaper as well as Danas and Start weekly news magazines.

He reported from the scene of armed conflicts such as the Soviet–Afghan War, Iran–Iraq War, Lebanese Civil War, and Gulf War. Furthermore, he managed to obtain access to some of the leading global military figures of the period on both sides of the Cold War, including US Army general Bernard W. Rogers in October 1982 (who at the time performed the role of NATO's Supreme Allied Commander Europe) as well as Soviet Army general Sergey Akhromeyev in December 1982 who was about to become a Marshal.

Other figures Lazanski interviewed included John Galvin, Warsaw Pact commander-in-chief Viktor Kulikov in 1986, Soviet Minister of Defense Dmitry Yazov in 1988, Soviet Navy commander-in-chief admiral Vladimir Chernavin, KGB chief general Vladimir Kryuchkov, Igor Radionov, Bennie L. Davis, Paul Sper, Crosbie E. Saint, Huntington Hardisty, Sir John Woodward, James Alan Abrahamson, Johan Jørgen Holst, Ferenc Kárpáti, Vasile Milea, Dobri Dzhurov, Afghani minister of defense Shahnawaz Tanai, Maher Abdul Rashid, Helmut Willmann, Guido Venturoni, Joe Modise, Georg Meiring, etc.

While writing for different Balkan publications, Lazanski's articles were also published in the Greek newspaper Kathimerini and the Japanese newspapers Diamond Weekly and Securitarian.

Speaking in September 2014 about his methods of access to military officials on both sides of the Cold War, Lazanski said:

I used the circumstances of the Cold War and the fact that SFR Yugoslavia was non-aligned, meaning that it was neither a part of NATO nor Warsaw Pact. Many of the interviews I scored in the Soviet Union came about because top Soviet military officials wouldn't communicate directly with the Western media, but they would talk to a Yugoslav journalist for a Yugoslav newspaper or magazine knowing full well that interview would later be carried by a Western publication. As far as the Western military brass went, getting them to talk for a Yugoslav media outlet was never an issue. They very much wanted to address the Yugoslav public as part of their overall PR effort.

=== Politika ===
In February 1991, Lazanski took an offer from Politika to become their commentator and moved to Belgrade. He remained at the job until fall 1995.

He reported from the Yugoslav Wars (including the Ten-Day War, Croatian War, Bosnian War and Kosovo War) as well as the First Chechen War, Libyan Civil War, and annexation of Crimea by the Russian Federation. In 2016, Lazanski interviewed commander-in-chief of the Syrian Armed Forces, Bashar al-Assad. He was the only foreign reporter in North Korea during the 2018 February military parade held in honor of Military Foundation Day. He has also authored several books.

== Views ==
Regarding NATO exercises in the Baltic, Lazanski believed it to be part of an "anti-Russian hysteria" in the creation in the West, and that claims that Russia holds aggressive military plans for the Baltic, and at the same time NATO does not have these for Eastern Europe, is false.

== Television ==
Lazanski was interviewed in Boris Malagurski's documentary film The Weight of Chains 2 (2014). He has guested on RTS's Upitnik, Oko, Srbija na vezi, Tako stoji stvari, TV lica, B92's Kažiprst, RTRS's Terorizam, svijet u strahu!, RTV Pink's Jutarnji program, Dobro Jutro, Emisija Pravac, Teška reč, and HRT's Otvoreno. He was a frequent guest on TV Happy's popular show Ćirilica ("Cyrillic") hosted by Milomir Marić. Lazanski was the host of Lazanski direktno on RTRS. He has authored two documentary films, Rat za Kosovo (War for Kosovo ) and Komandosi (Commandoes), and fronted several more.

== Politics ==
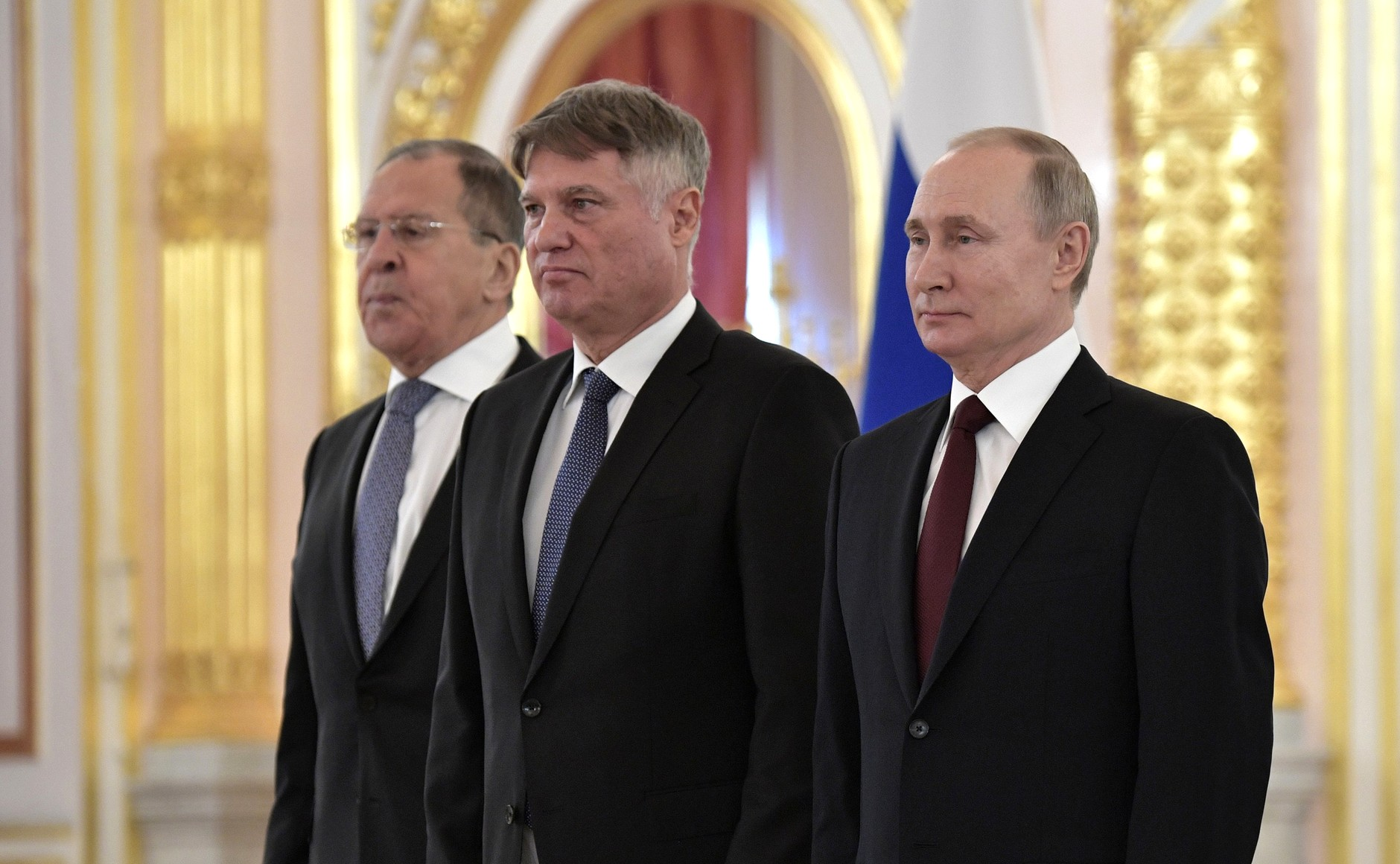
Lazanski besides Russian Foreign Minister Sergey Lavrov (left) and Russian President Vladimir Putin, 5 February 2020

On 4 March 2016, it was confirmed that he was a member of the electoral list of ministers to the National Assembly of Serbia as member of a group of independents in the coalition led by Aleksandar Vučić and the Serbian Progressive Party. Lazanski became a member of the Board on Defense and Internal Affairs, as chosen by the National Assembly by 22 June 2016. He resigned from the assembly on 25 September 2019 after being appointed Serbia's ambassador to Russia.

== Personal life ==
Lazanski is related to former president of Republika Srpska Biljana Plavšić, his maternal grandmother and Plavšić's father being siblings (Lazanski's mother and Plavšić are cousins).

Lazanski's spouse was from Belgrade and they had a son.

== Death ==
On 3 August 2021, Lazanski died of a heart attack in his home in Belgrade at the age of 70.

== Honours ==
- Yugoslavia: Medal for Military Merits (1977)
- Republika Srpska: Order of Honor (2018)

== Work ==
Books

- Jutarnja patrola [Morning Patrol] (1999)
- Uvek postoji sutra [There is Always Tomorrow] (2000)
- Bin Laden protiv Amerike [Bin Laden Against America] (2001)
- Istina o Srpskoj [Truth about Srpska] (2001)
- Komandosi [Commandos] (2002)
- Borbeni avioni [Fighter Planes] (2002)
- Hitler je pobedio [Hitler Won] (2003)
- Vreme izdaje [Time of Betrayal] (2008)

Films

- Jugoslovenska narodna armija [Yugoslav People's Army], documentary
- Rat za Kosmet/Rat za Kosovo [War for Kosovo], documentary
- Komandosi [Commandos], documentary
- Titova soba tajni [Tito's Secret Room] (2014), documentary, director
- Dnevnik iz Sirije [Diary from Syria] (2015), documentary
