= Sitel (North Macedonia) =

Television Channel from North Macedonia

Sitel Television
- Country: North Macedonia
- Broadcast area: North Macedonia; Worldwide

Programming
- Language: Macedonian
- Picture format: 16:9 (1080p, HDTV) 2013

Ownership
- Sister channels: Sitel 2 Sitel 3

History
- Launched: 17 September 1994

Links
- Website: www.sitel.com.mk

Availability

Terrestrial
- Digital: Channel ?
- VIP TV: Channel 004

Streaming media
- WebMax TV: Watch Live (MKD) Only
- OnNet: Watch Live (MKD) Only

Sitel Television (Macedonian: Сител Телевизија, Sitel Televizija) is a private television channel and national broadcaster from North Macedonia.

== History ==
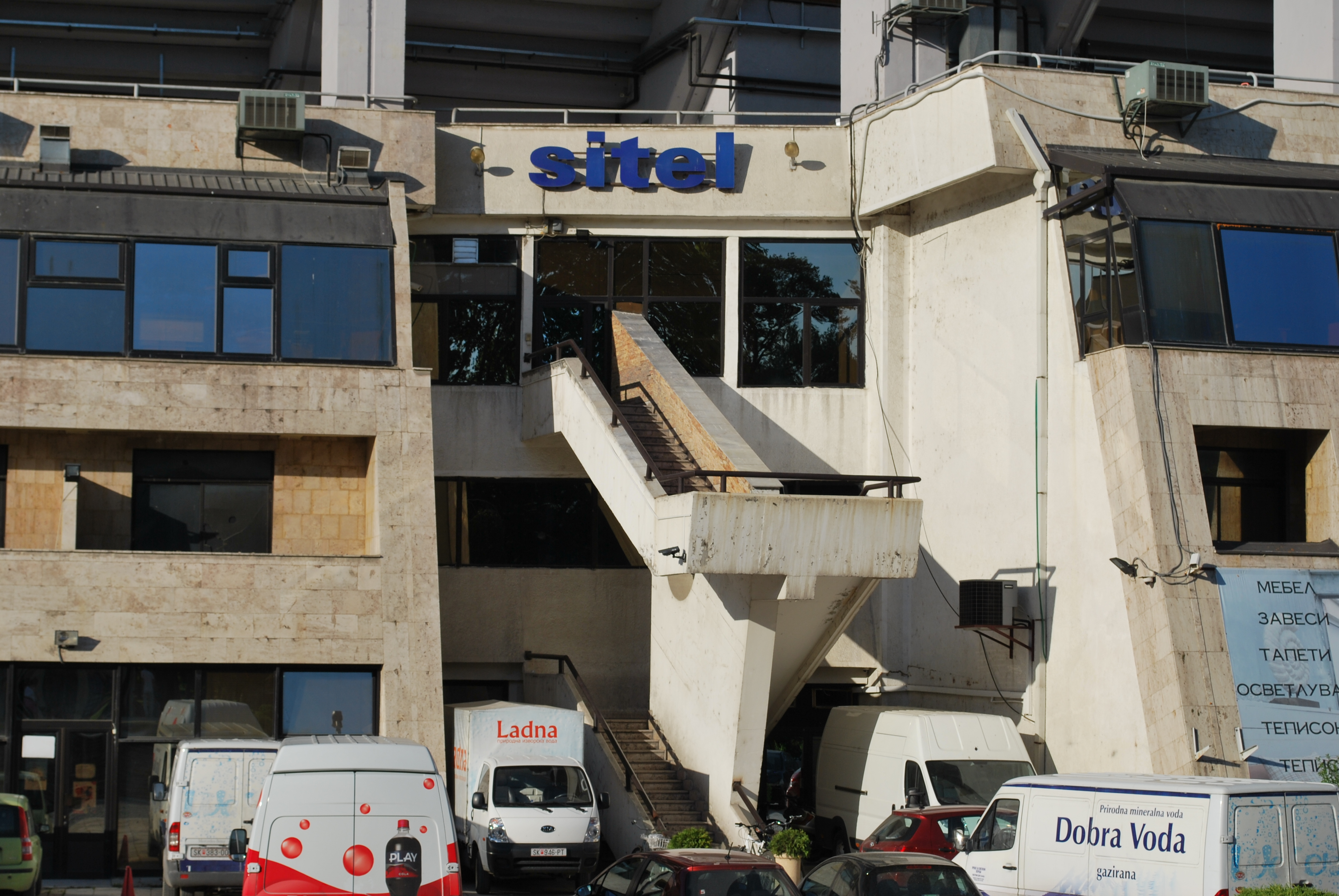
The headquarters of Sitel in Skopje.

Sitel Television was founded on 17 September 1994, as the second private and independent TV station in North Macedonia. The current number of employees is approximately 150 (managing and editorial board, journalists, reporters, announcers, technical staff, marketing and administration) and there are also a large number of correspondents and external cooperators. Sitel TV airs various genres, including Turkish drama, game shows, and informative podcasts. However, the main output is "informative programming", which includes central news bulletins aired at 19:00 and 23:00 (or 23:15), short news aired at 16:00, as well as round tables, interviews and dialogues. The channels evening news programming is presented by Ivan Kuzmanovski, Marjan Nikolovski, Valentin Nikoloski or Slavica Arsova, the latter of who also serves as the network's Chief News Editor.

In the beginning of 2007, Sitel TV began broadcasting its program through satellite, covering nations worldwide. Currently, the network broadcasts on Eutelsat 16A, Astra 3C, Eutelsat 172B and Intelsat 901 to audiences in Europe, Australia, USA and Canada.

Sitel TV was owned by the company of Goran Ivanovski, son of Socialist Party leader Ljubisav Ivanov – Džingo. As a result, Sitel was warned by the Broadcasting Council in 2012 to comply with 2005 Broadcasting Law, which forbids incumbent politicians or their relatives from owning broadcasters. Sitel was among the biggest supporters of Nikola Gruevski's government, receiving millions of euros from it. On 24 March 2017, the conference organized by the Institute for Communication Studies (IKS), based on monitoring of television news coverage made from September to February 2017, classified Sitel as a propagandistic outlet, as favourable towards VMRO-DPMNE and negative towards SDSM. It is among the most watched channels in the country.
