= Kanal 5 (North Macedonia) =

Канал 5 Kanal 5
- Country: North Macedonia
- Broadcast area: North Macedonia
- Headquarters: Skopje, North Macedonia

Programming
- Language: Macedonian
- Picture format: 16:9 (1080i, HDTV)

Ownership
- Owner: Emil Stojmenov
- Sister channels: Kanal 5 plus Kanal 5 HD

History
- Launched: 1998

Links
- Website: www.kanal5.com.mk

Availability

Terrestrial
- Analog: Channel ?
- Digital: Channel ?
- Boom TV: Channel 005

Streaming media
- WebMax TV: Watch Live (MKD) Only
- OnNet: Watch Live (MKD) Only

Other variations of Logo of Kanal 5

Kanal 5 (Macedonian: Канал 5) is a national, privately owned, television channel in the Republic of North Macedonia. It was founded by Borislav Stojmenov in 1998 as “TV BS.” The network's main office is in Skopje, and also has smaller studios in other bigger cities all around North Macedonia.

For the first six years, the network broadcast to the coverage area of Skopje with fifty employees before expanding reach to the rest of the country. Kanal 5 has publicly had a strong aim of being a part of every household. Kanal 5 TV (Channel 5 TV) currently has an audience reach of 96% of the Macedonian population. However, its new "sister" channel Kanal 5 plus currently has an audience reach of 76% of the Macedonian population.

From August 2009 until June 2012, Kanal 5 TV was the exclusive Macedonian broadcaster of all football matches from the UEFA Champions League, the UEFA Europa League and UEFA Super Cup.

In May 2010, Kanal 5 started its own HD programme, called "Kanal 5 HD", on the national IPTV operator, T-Home's Max TV.

Канал 5 Вести (Kanal 5 News) is the station's news division. The network's flagship evening and latenight news bulletins are presented by Tatjana Stojanovska Kitanovska, Ljubica Janevska Ivanovska or Borislav Tnokovski. Morning shows are presented by Robert Jankov, Milena Antovska Stankovska, Jelena Spendzarska, Vera Mesterovic, Aleksandra Panovska Ilievska and Bisera Lovačeva. The network's Chief News Editor is Goce Mihailoski.
