= Television in Russia =

Television is the most popular medium in Russia, with 74% of the population watching national television channels routinely and 59% routinely watching regional channels. There are 6,700 television channels in total. Before going digital, 3 channels had a nationwide outreach (over 90% coverage of the Russian territory): Channel Five – Petersburgh, Channel One and Russia-1.

== History ==
Between 1941 and 1945 all television broadcasts in the nation were interrupted because of Nazi Germany's invasion of the Soviet Union. During these early years, most television programs were about life in the Soviet Union, cultural activities and sports.

In 1956 a second national television channel was established. This initial expansion of activity encompassed mostly the city of Moscow, but to a lesser extent also Leningrad, the Urals, Siberia and the Ukrainian SSR. Each republic, area or region had its own television station.

In the 1970s and 1980s, television become the preeminent mass medium. In 1988 approximately 75 million households owned television sets, and an estimated 93 percent of the population watched television. Moscow, the base from which most of the television stations broadcast, transmitted some 90 percent of the country's programs, with the help of more than 350 stations and nearly 1,400 relay facilities.

Updating the television in the Soviet Union, the release of its censorship by the Central Committee, began with the proclamation at the XXVII Congress of the new General Secretary Mikhail Gorbachev's new political course of the party in relation to the country. Chairman of the Radio and Television was Alexander Aksenov.

In 1991, the Soviet era Gosteleradio state system included six national television channels, 52 stations in the former Soviet republics and 78 regional stations in the Russian Federation.

Today, there are about 15,000 transmitters in the country. Development of domestic digital TV transmitters, led within "Multichannel" research program, had already been finished. New domestic digital transmitters have been developed and installed in Nizhniy Novgorod and Saint Petersburg in 2001–2002.

== Legislation ==
The Russian Constitution was adopted by national referendum on 12 December 1993. Article 29 "On the Rights and Freedoms of the Person and Citizen" establishes the universal right to freedom of thought and opinion, freedom of expression of beliefs and convictions, and freedom to seek, receive, transmit, produce and disseminate information. This right can be limited only by law and only "in the interests of protecting the Constitution, morality, health, rights and lawful interests of other persons, or for the defence of the country and national security". According to the Constitution, only the law can limit freedom of speech and establish limits for its expression. The fundamental piece of media-specific federal legislation is the Law on Mass Media, which was passed on 27 December 1991 and took effect on 13 February 1992.

The law reinforces the freedom of information and the unacceptability of censorship. It also contains provisions regulating the founding, ownership and use of mass media, and dissemination of information. The law regulates relations between mass media and citizens and/or organisations, determines the rights and obligations of journalists and establishes responsibility for violations of mass media-related laws. The Law on Mass Media allows private broadcasting and limits the rights of foreign individuals to found mass media in Russia.

== Satellite television ==
The first Soviet communication satellite, called Molniya, was launched in 1965. By November 1967 the national system of satellite television, called Orbita was deployed. The system consisted of 3 highly elliptical Molniya satellites, with Moscow-based ground uplink facilities and about 20 downlink stations, located in cities and towns of remote regions of Siberia and the Far East. Each station had a 12-meter receiving parabolic antenna and transmitters for re-broadcasting TV signals to local householders.

However, a large part of the Soviet central regions were still not covered by transponders of Molniya satellites. By 1976 Soviet engineers developed a relatively simple and inexpensive system of satellite television (especially for Central and Northern Siberia). It included geostationary satellites called Ekran equipped with powerful 300-watt UHF transponders, a broadcasting uplink station and various simple receiving stations located in various towns and villages of Siberia. The typical receiving station, also called Ekran, included a home-use analog satellite receiver equipped with a simple Yagi-Uda antenna. Later, Ekran satellites were replaced by more advanced Ekran-M series satellites.

In 1979 Soviet engineers developed the Moskva (or Moscow) system of broadcasting and delivering of TV signals via satellites. New types of geostationary communication satellites, called Gorizont, were launched. They were equipped with powerful onboard transponders, so the size of the receiving station's parabolic antennas were reduced to 4 and 2.5 meters (in comparison to the early 12- meter dishes of the standard orbital downlink stations).

By 1989 an improved version of the Moskva system, called Moskva Global'naya, (or Moscow Global) was introduced. The system included a few geostationary Gorizont and Express type communication satellites. TV signals from Moscow Global's satellites could be received in any country on the planet except Canada and the Northwest USA.

Modern Russian satellite broadcasting services are based on powerful geostationary satellite buses such as Gals (satellite), Ekspress, USP and Eutelsat which provide a large quantity of free-to-air television channels to millions of householders. Pay-TV is growing in popularity amongst Russian TV viewers. The NTV Russia news company, owned by Gazprom, broadcasts the NTV Plus package to 560,000 households, reaching over 1.5 million viewers.

Six out of these seven satellites are new vehicles. Four belong to the "Express-AM" family (sent into orbit in 2003–2005), and two to the "Express-A" family (sent into orbit in 2000–2002). SESC also uses the centre for TV/Radio signal compression standard along with the formation of data transport flows as per the MPEG-2/DVB standard, which ensures the formation of standardized signal packages from federal TV/radio channels.

By May 2013, of the 53 million TV homes in Russia, 24% were equipped for Direct-to-Home satellite reception, making satellite the country's leading platform for digital television. The number of satellite homes across Russia continues to grow, increasing by 25% between 2011 and 2013 from 8 million to 12.6 million. 10% of these homes receive signals from more than one satellite position, taking the total number of antennas to 13.8 million.

== Cable television ==
Cable television was introduced in the 2000s, and grew significantly in the early 2010s. Cable operators began upgrading their networks to DVB-C and adding new services such as video on demand, catch-up-TV and others. In 2012, cable television accounted for more than half of all pay-TV subscribers (58%). Most of Pay-TV channels were closed due to 2022 Russian invasion of Ukraine due to the fact that they were non-Government owned.

== Distribution of the terrestrial channels ==
The distribution of the terrestrial channels is the task of the Unitary Enterprise Russian Satellite Communications Company, which has 11 satellites, and the Federal unitary enterprise "Russian TV and Radio Broadcasting Network" serving 14,478 TV transmitters in Russia (90.9% of the total number). TV and radio channels are broadcast through the terrestrial satellite communications complexes owned by the Russian Satellite Communications Company at teleports located in Medvezhy Ozera (Russian: Медвежьи озера), Vladimir and Dubna, which ensure the transmission of channels to all five time zones in Russia via the space vehicles of RTRN.

== Digital broadcasting ==
=== Beginning ===
In December 2005, a project was launched to create a digital television network in the Republic of Mordovia, where the DVB-T standard will be utilised. The project objective was to ensure for the population, the possibility of receiving a large (up to 10) number of TV channels and several radio stations in the stereo broadcasting mode and in the digital DVB-T standard. The project was implemented by OJSC "Volga Telecom" (a subsidiary of OJSC "Sviazinvest") with support from the Ministry of Information Technologies and Communication of Russia, the Ministry of Culture, the National Association of TV Broadcasters and administration of the Republic of Mordovia.

Different alternatives were considered in the process of preparing proposals on shifting the country to digital broadcasting (thematic discussions began in the early 2000s), but the Ministry of IT and Communication decided to focus solely on terrestrial broadcasting as the method of digital TV implementation. In Russia, the first legal act to set the standards for the digital transition was the Government Resolution No. 1700-r of 29 November 2007, which approved a Concept Paper for the Development of TV and Radio Broadcasting in the Russian Federation in 2008–2015. This document was elaborated by the high-level Governmental Commission on Development of TV and Radio Broadcasting originally headed by Dmitry Medvedev in his capacity as first vice-chair of the government.

The transition of terrestrial TV from analogue into digital format (in DVB-T standard) had been announced as a government priority in Russia and identified in the document Concept of TV Broadcasting Development in the Russian Federation within 2008–2015. The main positive factor in the introduction of terrestrial TV broadcasting in the DVB-T standard, according to the opinion of market players, has been the approval of a TV broadcasting development framework in the Russian Federation for 2008–2015 (approved by resolution of the Government # 1700-p, dated 29 November 2007).

The total investment in the transition of terrestrial TV from analogue to digital format is expected to be Euro 10 billion during the period 2008–2015.

The main factors which have a high positive influence upon the rates of terrestrial DTV introduction tend to be general political and macroeconomic factors. Commercial factors do not have a significant influence upon rates of introduction of digital standards for terrestrial broadcasting. Cable television would gain the largest financial benefits from the introduction of digital television.

On 10 May during Sviaz-Expocomm – 2011, the 23rd International Exhibition of Information Technologies and Communication Services in Moscow, Russia's national telecommunications operator Svyazinvest, together with Russian Television and Radio Broadcasting Network signed a cooperation agreement to organize the terrestrial transmission of digital content to the RRBN transmitters across the country, thus enabling the broadcasting of eight federal TV channels (Channel One, Russia 1, Russia 24, Russia 2, Russia K, Channel 5, NTV, Karusel) and one local channel, the latter to be transmitted as a "multiplex" channel on one of the main digital channels.

In June 2011 DVB-T2 tests got under way in Moscow. In July 2011 The Russian government commission on the development of TV and radio broadcasting, has supported the Communications and Mass Media Ministry's suggestion to roll out DVB-T2 test zones, the government's press service has announced.

In September 2011 a governmental commission had approved the use of the DVB-T2 standard for the development of digital terrestrial TV in Russia, as proposed by the Ministry of Communications. The digital terrestrial TV network was being tested out in the Tver Oblast. It was planned that new regional networks will be deployed under the DVB-T2 standard and existing DVB-T networks will be upgraded to the new standard

=== Digital switchover ===
It took Russia 10 years to move from analogue to digital broadcasting. The Digital Switchover (DSO) was completed in late 2019. On December 3, 2009, the Russian Government approved the federal target programme "Development of TV and Radio Broadcasting in the Russian Federation in 2009-2018". The main objective of the programme was to provide the population of the Russian Federation with free-to-air multichannel digital TV and radio broadcasting.

Before 2010 almost half of Russia's population, 44%, could watch no more than four channels. There was no room left for development of analogue broadcasting. Authorities have envisaged TV multiplexes in 2009. The list of channels in the first of the two of them was approved by a decree of the President of Russia.

Over a period of 10 years, about 100 million TV-sets and about 20 million digital set-top boxes were sold. This had set the stage for the analogue switch-off (ASO). On November 29, 2018, the Russian government approved the ASO roadmap. The federal target programme included modernizing the whole structure of terrestrial broadcasting. It is considered the biggest programme of digital TV development in the world.

In December 2018, the pilot region, the Tver Region, phased out analogue broadcasting of 20 federal TV channels. In 2019, Russia switched off analogue TV broadcasting in four stages: February 11 (8 regions), April 15 (20 regions), June 3 (36 regions) and October 14 (21 regions).

Russia was the first BRICS country to complete the ASO. Preparation for each stage of the ASO included a number of activities:

1. Informing the population, both through federal and regional media.

2. Placing information materials in post offices, social protection centres, retail appliances and electronics stores.

3. Door-to-door activities in all localities of the Russian Federation.

4. Attracting volunteers to assist the population in setting up equipment for receiving DTT. 70,000 volunteers, 30,000 social workers and 50,000 Russian Post employees participated in the process.

5. Creating the Digital Switchover Task Force with representatives of the Russian government, regional authorities and all organizations involved.

6. Monitoring the cost of the TV reception equipment in retail stores.

7. Carrying out inspection of сommunity antenna TV systems for DTT broadcasting in apartment buildings and, if necessary, repairing and upgrading them.

8. Developing mechanisms and conditions for providing the population living outside the DTT coverage area with satellite equipment at a reduced price.

9. Providing targeted assistance for vulnerable and/or low-income citizens.

A special digital terrestrial TV hotline has been opened in the run-up to the ASO. Operators consulted viewers on buying up-to-date DVB-T2 equipment and adjusting it to their conditions. Russian Television and Radio Broadcasting Network staff tested equipment from the retail and informed viewers through the hotline about the best choices. 78 DTT Consultation Centers operated in administrative centers of Russian regions.

100% of the Russian population have got the guaranteed public access to 20 must-carry public TV channels and three radio stations, 98,4% of them — through DTT.

To complete the Digital Switchover RTRN collaborated with IT software manufacturers Nevion and Progira.

More than 11,000 analogue TV transmitters were put out of operation. The DTT transition has laid the foundations for the development of new services (HD, UHD, HbbTV and so on).

Participation in the national program "Digital Economy of the Russian Federation" and new telecom services implementation are RTRN's main current objectives.

RTRN has successfully tested the main standards of digital broadcasting including DRM.

== Internet TV ==
Russian TV is available to many expatriates living abroad, via the internet. There are several OTT service providers, which are targeted on Russian and Ukrainian expatriates in the United States and Canada.

== List of channels ==
This is a list of television channels that broadcast in Russia. Full list of channels

=== Terrestrial Nationwide Digital Broadcasting Program ===
==== First Multiplex ====
Channels
Channel	Name	Certificate of Broadcast	Date of first digital Broadcast	Frame
ch. 1	Channel One	77 — 50252 07.06.2012	2012	16:9
ch. 2	Russia-1	77 — 76122 24.06.2019	2012	16:9
ch. 3	Match TV	77 — 63590 02.11.2015	2015	16:9
ch. 4	NTV	77 — 62736 18.08.2015	2012	16:9
ch. 5	Channel Five – Petersburgh	77 — 71806 08.12.2017	2012	16:9
ch. 6	Russia-K	77 — 48107 30.12.2011	2012	16:9
ch. 7	Russia-24	77 — 48108 30.12.2011	2012	16:9
ch. 8	Carousel	77 — 51992 11.12.2012	2012	16:9
ch. 9	Public Channel	77 — 78997 15.09.2020	2013	16:9
ch. 10	TV Centre – Moscow	77 — 62849 20.08.2015	2014	16:9

Radio networks
Position	Name
RN1	Vesti FM
RN2	Radio Mayak
RN3	Radio Rossii

==== Second Multiplex ====
Channels
Channel	Name	Certificate of Broadcast	Date of first digital Broadcast	Frame
ch. 11	REN TV	77 — 66270 01.07.2016	2013	16:9
ch. 12	Spas	77 — 74808 11.01.2019	2014	16:9
ch. 13	STS	77 — 72433 05.03.2018	2013	16:9
ch. 14	Domashny	77 — 71389 01.11.2017	2013	16:9
ch. 15	TV-3	77 — 71695 23.11.2017	2014	16:9
ch. 16	Friday!	77 — 71810 13.12.2017	2015	16:9
ch. 17	Zvezda	77 — 61865 18.05.2015	2013	16:9
ch. 18	MIR	77 — 48753 22.02.2012	2013	16:9
ch. 19	TNT	77 — 71680 23.11.2017	2013	16:9
ch. 20	Muz-TV	77 — 65731 20.05.2016	2013	16:9
ch. 999	RTRS Plus	77 - 6717 18.12.2002	2022	HbbTV service

=== State-owned ===
Name	Themes	Owner	Established	Broadcast area	Broadcast technology	Website
Russia 1		VGTRK	1991	Nationwide	Terrestrial	russia.tv
Russia K		VGTRK	1997			tvkultura.ru
Russia 24		VGTRK	2006			www.vesti.ru
Carousel		Channel One Russia and VGTRK	2010			www.karusel-tv.ru
RT (group of channels)		TV-Novosti	2005			rt.com
TV Centre	News, entertainment, educational, sports	Moscow Media	1997	Nationwide	Terrestrial	tvc.ru
Central Television		Moscow Media	2012	Nationwide	Cable	
Moskva 24		Moscow Media	2011	Moscow	Terrestrial	www.m24.ru
Moskva Doverie		Moscow Media	2016	Moscow	Cable	www.doverie-tv.ru
360		Moscow Media	2014	Moscow, Moscow Oblast	Cable	www.360tv.ru
360 – Moscow News		Moscow Media	2018	Moscow, Moscow Oblast	Cable	www.360tv.ru
Zvezda		Ministry of Defence	2005			tvzvezda.ru
Zvezda Plus		Ministry of Defence	2021			tvzvezda.ru/sp/zvezda-plus/
SPAS		Russian Orthodox Church of the Moscow Patriarchate	2006			www.spastv.ru
OTR		Russian government	2013	Nationwide	Terrestrial	www.otr-online.ru
Mir		10 states from CIS	1992			mirtv.ru
Mir 24		10 states from CIS	2013			mir24.tv
NTV		Gazprom Media (Gazprombank)	1993	Nationwide	Terrestrial	www.ntv.ru
Match TV		Gazprom Media (Gazprombank)	2015			matchtv.ru
TNT		Gazprom Media (Gazprombank)	1998			tnt-online.ru
TV3		Gazprom Media (Gazprombank)	1994			tv3.ru
Friday!		Gazprom Media (Gazprombank)	2013			friday.ru
Saturday!		Gazprom Media (Gazprombank)	2017			subbota.tv
TNT4		Gazprom Media (Gazprombank)	2016			tnt4.tnt-online.ru
2x2	Entertainment (animation)	Gazprom Media (Gazprombank)	1989	Nationwide	Terrestrial	2x2tv.ru
Channel One Russia		Russian government (34.23%), VTB Bank (32.89%), National Media Group (19.46%), Sogaz (13.42%)	1995	Nationwide	Terrestrial	www.1tv.ru
Channel Five – Petersburgh	Serials and films	National Media Group (72.43%), Sergey Rudnov (18.3%), Government of Saint-Petersburg (6.27%), Sogaz (3%)	1938	Nationwide	Terrestrial	https://5-tv.ru/
REN TV	News & entertainment	National Media Group (82%), Sogaz (18%)	1997	Commonwealth of Independent States	Terrestrial	http://ren.tv/
Izvestia		National Media Group	2017		Cable	http://iz.ru/
78		National Media Group (25%), Sergey Rudnov (75%)	2017		Cable	https://78.ru/
CTC TV	Entertainment	CTC Media (National Media Group)	1996		Terrestrial	http://ctc.ru/
Domashniy ("Home channel")	Family entertainment	CTC Media (National Media Group)	2005	Nationwide		http://domashniy.ru/
Che		CTC Media (National Media Group)	2015			http://chetv.ru/
CTC Love		CTC Media (National Media Group)	2014			http://ctclove.ru/
CTC Kids		CTC Media (National Media Group)	2018			http://ctckids.ru/
Muz-TV		Media-1 (pending sale to Media Telekom (joint venture National Media Group and Rostelecom)	1996			http://muz-tv.ru/
U		Media-1 (pending sale to Media Telekom (joint venture National Media Group and Rostelecom)	2012			https://u-tv.ru/
Solntse	Family entertainment	Media-1 (pending sale to Media Telekom (joint venture National Media Group and Rostelecom)	2022	Nationwide		http://sun-tv.ru/

=== Private ===
Name	Themes	Owner	Established	Broadcast area	Broadcast technology	Website
3ABN Russia	Religion (Adventist)	Three Angels Broadcasting Network	1992	International	Satellite?	https://3angels.ru/
RBC TV	24/7 News	ESN	2003	Nationwide	?	http://tv.rbc.ru/
Multilandia		Voxell Baltic	2006			http://www.multimania.tv
Kinomania		Voxell Baltic	2005			http://www.kinomania.tv
BRIDGE (music channel)		SAFMAR Media/Bridge Media Group	2005			http://bridgetv.ru/en/
Russian Travel Guide		RTG Corp.	2009			http://www.rtgtv.com/
BRIDGE Russian Hit		SAFMAR Media/Bridge Media Group	2010			http://rusongtv.ru/en/
BRIDGE Hits		SAFMAR Media/Bridge Media Group	2013			http://dangetv.ru/en/
Europa plus TV		EMG (European Media Group)	2011			http://www.europaplus.tv/
Ru.TV		RMG (Russian Media Group)	2006			https://www.ru.tv/
O_{2}TV		private investors	2004			http://o2tv.biz/en
RTVi		Rostec	2002			http://www.rtvi.ru/english.html
Nostalgiya		Veriselintel	2004			http://www.nostalgiatv.ru
Jivi!		Red Media (Gazprom-Media)	2008			https://www.jv.ru
Mosfilm Golden Collection		VGTRK & Mosfilm	2020			http://www.mosfilmgold.ru
Kuhnya TV		Red Media (Gazprom-Media)	2007			http://www.kuhnyatv.ru/
Eda		Pi-Stolet LLC	2011			https://www.tveda.ru/
Evrokino		Strim	2008			http://www.eurokino.tv
Avto Plus		Red Media (Gazprom-Media)	2006			http://www.autoplustv.com/
KVN TV		Red Media (Gazprom-Media)	2016			http://www.kvn.ru/tv
Boks TV		Red Media (Gazprom-Media)	2014			https://www.boxingtv.ru/
Vremya		Channel One Russia	2005			https://www.vremya.tv
Pobeda		Channel One Russia	2019			https://www.pobeda.tv
Dom Kino		Channel One Russia	2005			https://www.domkino.tv
Gulli Girl		Groupe M6	2016			https://www.gulli.ru
Zee TV Russia		Red Media (Gazprom-Media)	1992			http://www.zee-tv.ru
TiJi Russia		Groupe M6	2009			https://www.tiji.ru
Chanson TV		Mediamart	2006			https://www.shanson.tv
O!		Channel One Russia	2017			https://www.kanal-o.ru

=== Discontinued ===
Name	Owner	Established	Closed
Ostankino 4 now NTV (Russia)	RSTRC Ostankino	1991	1993
Ostankino 1 now ORT	RSTRC Ostankino	1991	1995
Rossiyskiye University now NTV (Russia)	Media Most and VGTRK	1993	1996
AMTV now STS (Russia)	Maraton-TV and Moskva-Revyu	1994	1996
MTK now Third Channel	Government of Moscow	1989	1997
Channel 24 now Peretz	Kosmos-TV	1994	1999
TeleExpo now Euronews Russia	Moskomimuschestvo and MosExpo	1995	2001
AST/Prometey AST discontinued in 2006	AST, Gazprom	1995	2002
TV6 now TVS (Russia)	MIBC (Moscow Independent Broadcasting Corporation) (Since 1999 – Boris Berezovsky and Lukoil-Garant)	1993	2002
TVS now Russia-2	Media-Sotsium	2002	2003
M1 now Domashniy	Mediainvest	1994	2005
Jetix now Disney Channel (Russia)	Jetix Europe	2005	2010
Jetix Play discontinued in 2010	Jetix Europe	2005	2010
Hallmark Channel now Diva Universal	Universal Networks International	1999	2010
Bibigon now Karusel	VGTRK	2007	2010
Seven TV now Disney Channel (Russia)	UTH Russia	2000	2011
Diva Universal now E!	NBCUniversal International Networks	2010	2014
Universal Channel discontinued in 2015	NBCUniversal International Networks	2007	2015
E! discontinued in 2015	NBCUniversal International Networks	2014	2015
Russia 2 now Match TV	VGTRK	2003	2015
NTV Plus channels	NTV Plus	1996	2016
A-One now TNT Music	private investors	2005	2016
AMC now Hollywood	AMC Networks International Central Europe	2014	2019
Sony Sci-fi now .sci-fi	Sony Pictures Television Inc.	2007	2021
Sony Channel now .red	Sony Pictures Television Inc.	2009	2021
Sony Turbo now .black	Sony Pictures Television Inc.	2012	2021
TV Rain discontinued in 2022	Natalia Sindeeva	2010	2022
Eurosport 1 discontinued in 2022	Warner Bros. Discovery	1996	2022
Discovery Channel Russia discontinued in 2022	Warner Bros. Discovery	1998	2022
Animal Planet discontinued in 2022	Warner Bros. Discovery	2006	2022
Cartoon Network discontinued in 2022	Warner Bros. Discovery	2009	2022
TLC Russia discontinued in 2022	Warner Bros. Discovery	2011	2022
Boomerang Russia discontinued in 2022	Warner Bros. Discovery	2013	2022
DTX discontinued in 2022	Warner Bros. Discovery	2016	2022
Discovery Ultra discontinued in 2022	Warner Bros. Discovery	2020	2022
JimJam discontinued in 2022	AMC Networks International Central Europe	2008	2022
MTV Russia discontinued in 2022	Paramount	1998	2022
Nickelodeon Russia discontinued in 2022	Paramount	1998	2022
Nick Jr. Russia discontinued in 2022	Paramount	2011	2022
Paramount Comedy (Russia) discontinued in 2022	Paramount	2012	2022
Nicktoons Russia discontinued in 2022	Paramount	2018	2022
National Geographic discontinued in 2022 now TERRA	The Walt Disney Company	1997	2022
National Geographic Wild discontinued in 2022	The Walt Disney Company	2007	2022
BabyTV discontinued in 2022	The Walt Disney Company	2007	2022
Fox Russia now Kineko	The Walt Disney Company	2007	2022
Fox Life Russia now Sapfir	The Walt Disney Company	2008	2022
Disney Channel now Solntse	The Walt Disney Company	2010 (cable)	2022
Disney Channel now Solntse	Media1	2011 (terrestrial)	2022
TV1000 now viju TV1000	Viasat World	2003	2023
Viasat Explorer now viju Explore	Viasat World	2003	2023
Viasat History now viju History	Viasat World	2004	2023
TV1000 Russkoe Kino now viju TV1000 russkoe	Viasat World	2005	2023
Viasat Sport East now viju+sport	Viasat World	2006	2023
TV1000 Action East now viju TV1000 action	Viasat World	2008	2023
ViP Serial now viju+serial	Viasat World		2023
Viasat Nature now viju+nature	Viasat World	2010	2023
ViP Comedy now viju+comedy	Viasat World	2012	2023
ViP Premiere now viju+premiere	Viasat World	2012	2023
ViP Megahit now viju+megahit	Viasat World	2012	2023

NTV-Plus

Tricolor

== Most-viewed channels ==
Weekly viewing shares, 1-7 June 2026:

Position	Channel	Group	Share of total viewing, age 4+ (%)
1	Thematical TV channels		14.7
2	Russia 1	VGTRK (state-owned)	13.4
3	NTV	Gazprom-Media (Gazprombank, state-owned)	9.0
4	Channel One	Government of Russia (34.23%), VTB Bank (32.89%), National Media Group (19.46%), Sogaz (13.42%)	7.5
5	REN TV	National Media Group (82%), Sogaz (18%)	7.2
6	Channel Five	National Media Group (72.43%), Sergey Rudnov (18.3%), Government of Saint-Petersburg (6.27%), Sogaz (3%)	6.8
7	Domashny	National Media Group	5.4
8	TNT	Gazprom-Media (Gazprombank, state-owned)	4.2
9	TV Center	Moscow Media (state-owned)	3.8
10	CTC	National Media Group	3.8
11	Carousel	VGTRK and Channel One	3.1

== See also ==
- List of Russian-language television channels
- Television in the Soviet Union
- Mass media in Russia
