= NTV Plus =

Russian television station

NTV Plus НТВ Плюс
- Country: Russia
- Headquarters: Moscow

Programming
- Picture format: 16:9 (SDTV)

Ownership
- Owner: NTV Plus B.V.

History
- Launched: September 1, 1996

Links
- Website: www.ntvplus.ru www.ntvt.com.ua (Ukraine)

Previous NTV logo

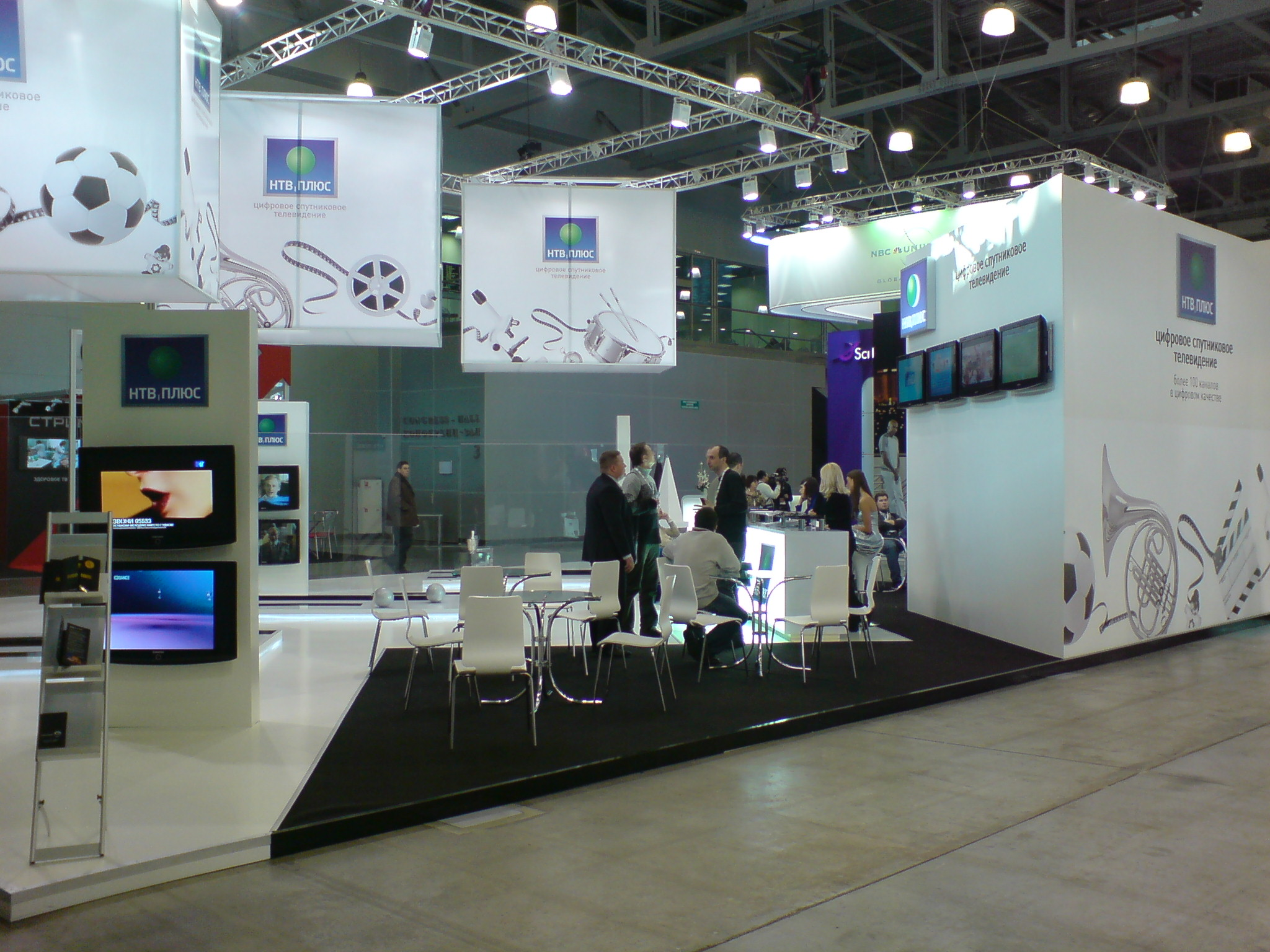
NTV-Plus on CSTB-2009 exhibition, February, Moscow, Crocus Expo.

NTV Plus (Russian: НТВ Плюс) is the brand name for the Russian digital satellite television provider, transmitted from Eutelsat's W4 satellite at 36.0°E and from Bonum 1 at 56.0°E. Previously a part of Vladimir Gusinsky's MediaMost holding, now it is the flagship product of NTV Plus B.V. (owned by Gazprom Media) which is based in the Netherlands.

== History ==
- 1996 - First broadcasts of NTV-Plus appeared on September 1, 1996
- 1997 - Since early in the year the channels were broadcast in encoded form.
- 1998 - On November 22 NTV-Plus started satellite TV broadcasting.
- 1999 - In February NTV-Plus switched from an analogue to digital broadcasting system allowing the expansion of the number of channels from five to fifty. In December NTV-Plus started re-broadcasting digital channels in two languages.
- 2000 - On May 25 another Eutelsat-W4 satellite was put into orbit allowing the expansion of the broadcasting area.
- 2005 - Beginning of Dolby Digital 5.1 broadcasting
- 2006 - Broadcasting begins in Ukraine territory
- 2007 - Broadcasting in HDTV started
- 2010 - Broadcasting in 3D TV started. By cooperation with Panasonic, "NTV plus 3D" channel was launched.
- 2017 - Broadcasting in 4K/UHD started
- 2022 - The Denis Diderot Committee, a European group of professional and academics researchers and professionals ask sanctions against NTV Plus for having cancelled various international news channels from its line-up.

== Channels ==
=== Variety, entertainment ===
- TVP Polonia
- Channel One Russia (Perviy Kanal) (SD/HD)
- Russia-1 (Rossiya 1) (SD/HD)
- NTV (НТВ) (SD/HD)
- NTV Hit
- NTV Pravo
- NTV Serial
- NTV Stil'
- Petersburg - Channel 5 (SD)
- Russia K
- OTR
- REN TV (SD)
- STS
- TNT (SD/HD)
- TNT4 (SD)
- TV3 (SD)
- TV Tsentr
- Telekanal Domashny
- Che!
- Pyatnitsa!
- Subbota!
- U (TV channel, Russia)
- 2×2
- Telekanal Zvezda
- TNV Planeta (Tatarstan)
- TDK
- Psychologia21
- Spas
- Mir
- Kukhnia TV
- Nostalgia
- STV (TV channel, Russia)
- Kuban 24 Orbita
- Telecafe
- 8 Kanal
- Mama

=== Sports ===
- Match TV (SD/HD)
- Match Nash Sport
- Match Arena (SD/HD)
- Match Game
- Match Planeta
- Match Strana
- Match Boets
- Match Futbol 1
- Match Futbol 2
- Match Futbol 3
- Match TV Horse World
- Eurosport 1 (SD/HD)
- Eurosport 2 (HD)
- Extreme Sports Channel (SD)
- Telekanal Russian Extreme
- Konnyy Mir
- KHL (SD/HD)
- KHL Prime
- Viju+ Sport
- Boytsovskiy klub

=== News ===
- Euronews (SD)
- Mir 24 (SD)
- Moskva 24 (SD)
- Russia 24 (SD)
- RBC TV (SD)
- Perviy Meteo (SD)
- RT
- RT Arabic
- RT en Español
- RT France
- RT Deutsch
- RT Balkan
- RT Hindi

=== International ===
- Armenia TV (SD)

=== Movies ===
- Teleklub
- Dom Kino
- Indiyskoye Kino
- Kinokomedia
- Kinoseriya
- Kinomix
- Kinouzhas
- Nashe Novoye Kino
- Rodnoe Kino
- Kinohit
- Kinopremiera
- Kinosemiya
- Kinosvidanie
- Muzhkoye Kino
- FX Russia (SD/HD)
- FX Life Russia (SD)
- Comedy Central Russia (SD)
- Viju TV1000
- Viju TV1000 Kino
- Viju TV1000 Action
- Russkij Illusion
- Illusion +
- Hollywood
- Eurokino
- TV XXI (SD)
- AMEDIA 1
- AMEDIA 2
- AMEDIA Premium

=== Music ===
- Muzika Pervogo
- Telekanal La Minor
- TNT Music (SD)
- MTV Global (SD)
- Club MTV (SD)
- MTV Hits (SD)
- MTV 80s (SD)
- MTV 90s (SD)
- MTV 00s (SD)
- Bridge TV
- Bridge TV Russkij Hit
- Bridge TV Classic
- Bridge TV Hits
- Bridge TV Deluxe
- Bridge TV Shlyager
- Bridge TV Fresh
- Bridge TV Rock
- Bridge TV Ethno
- Europa Plus TV
- Muz-TV
- Music Now
- 9X0
- 9XM
- B4U Music
- M Tune

=== Kids ===
- Cartoon Network CEE (SD)
- Cartoonito (SD)
- Detski Mir (SD)
- Duck TV (SD)
- Gulli Girl (SD)
- Karusel (SD)
- Kids TV (SD)
- Mult (SD)
- Nickelodeon (HD/SD)
- Solntse (SD)
- Telekanal O! (SD)
- TiJi (SD)

=== Documentary ===
- 24 Dok
- 365 Dnei TV
- Animal Planet (Europe)
- Auto Plus
- Da Vinci Learning
- Discovery Channel Russia
- Discovery Science
- Domashnie zhivotnye
- Istoriya (SD/HD)
- History
- Interesnoe TV
- Investigation Discovery Russia
- Kto Est' Kto
- My Planet
- National Geographic (Europe)
- Nat Geo Wild
- Nauka 2.0
- Ocean-TV
- Outdoor Channel
- RT Documentary
- Russian Travel Guide (SD)
- Soversheno Sekretno
- TLC (international)
- Viju Explore
- Viju History
- Viju Nature
- Ohota i Rybalka
- Prosveschenie
- Perviy Obrazovatelniy

=== Pay-per-view ===
- Kinoreys 1
- Kinoreys 2

=== HD ===
- HD Kino
- HD Life
- Discovery HD
- Animal Planet HD
- TLC HD
- MTV Live
- National Geographic HD
- Nat Geo Wild HD
- Match Premier
- FX Russia HD
- Nickelodeon HD
- Perviy Kanal HD
- Russia HD
- History HD
- AMEDIA Premium HD

=== 4K/UHD ===
- Fashion 4K
- Home 4K

=== Ukraine only ===
- Perviy Kanal Ukraina
- RTR Planeta
- NTN (Channel)
- NTV Mir

=== Adult ===
- Hustler TV (SD)
- Nuart TV (SD)
- Russkaya Noch (SD)
- Playboy TV (SD)

=== Radio ===
- AvtoRadio
- Business FM
- Comedy Radio
- Detskoe Radio
- DFM 101.2
- Echo of Moscow
- Hit FM
- Humor FM
- Love Radio
- Militseyskaya Volna
- NRJ Russia
- Radio Chanson
- Radio Dlya Dvoih
- Radio Komsomolskaya Pravda
- Radio Romantika
- Radio Maximum
- Radio Mir
- Radio Vanya
- Relax FM
- Russkoye Radio

=== Defunct ===
*AB Moteurs

.*AMC (Russia) (Replaced by Hollywood)

- BBC News (Russia)
- Boomerang (Russia) (Replaced by Cartoonito)
- Cartoon Network (Russia) (Replaced by Cartoon Network CEE)
- CBS Drama
- CBS Europa
- CBS Justice
- Chasse et Pêche
- CNN International
- DW-TV
- Discovery World (Replaced by DTX)
- Disney Channel (Russia) (Replaced by Solntse)
- DTX (Russia)
- E! (Russia)
- Fashion TV
- Fox (Russia) (Replaced by FX Russia)
- Fox Kids (Russia) (Rebranded as Jetix)
- Fox Life (Russia) (Replaced by FX Life Russia)
- Jetix (Russia) (Rebranded as Disney Channel)
- Jetix Play
- JimJam (Russia) (Replaced by Kids TV Russia)
- Love Nature
- Luxe.tv
- MGM (Russian TV channel) (Replaced by AMC (Russian TV channel)
- MTV (Russia) (Replaced by MTV Global)
- MTV Rocks (Replaced by MTV 00s)
- Nickelodeon (Russia) (Replaced by Nickelodeon Global)
- Nick Jr. (Russia)
- NTV Plus 3D
- NTV Plus Basketbol
- NTV Plus HD Kino 2
- NTV Plus Kinolyuks
- NTV Plus Kinosoyuz
- NTV Plus Muzika
- NTV Plus NBA TV
- NTV Plus Nochnoy Kanal
- NTV Plus Sport (Replaced by Match Planeta)
- NTV Plus Sporthit
- NTV Plus Sport Klassika
- NTV Plus Sport Online
- NTV Plus Sport Plus
- NTV Plus Sport Soyuz
- NTV Plus Tennis
- Paramount Channel (Russia)
- Paramount Comedy (Russia) (Replaced by Comedy Central Russia)
- Peretz (Replaced by Che!)
- RT America
- RT UK
- STS Mega
- STS Moskva (Moscow only)
- Syfy (Russia)
- TV Rain
- Tlum
- Trace Sport Stars
- Trace Urban
- Turner Classic Movies
- TV5Monde
- Universal Channel (Russia)
- VH1 (Russia) (Replaced by MTV 90s)
- VH1 Classic (Europe) (Replaced by MTV 80s)

== High-definition television (HDTV) ==
Starting from 2007, NTV Plus offers high-definition television (HDTV) programming. The following channels are offered: HD Kino (cinema), HD Sport (sports), HD Life (nature & travel), Eurosport HD, Discovery HD, MTV/Nickelodeon HD, National Geographic HD (nature).

The content is either produced by NTV Plus itself or received from foreign partners. The programming is delivered in 1080i25 format using H.264/MPEG-4 AVC codec with 10 Mbit/s data rate. NTV Plus has contracted with France's Thomson to manufacture the receivers that accept signal encoded in MPEG-4.
