= List of Russian-language television channels =

This is a list of television channels broadcasting regularly programmes in Russian language.

== State-owned ==
=== TV channels ===
Name	Owner	Established
Channel One Russia	Rosimushchestvo (state-owned) and Roman Abramovich	1991
Channel One International	Channel One Russia	1999
First Baltic channel	Baltic Media Alliance	2002
Russia-1	All-Russia State Television and Radio Broadcasting Company	1991
Russia-K (ex Kultura)	All-Russia State Television and Radio Broadcasting Company	1997
RTR-Planeta (International version of Russia-1)	All-Russia State Television and Radio Broadcasting Company	2002
Match TV (ex Russia-2)	All-Russia State Television and Radio Broadcasting Company	2003
Russia-24 (ex Vesti)	All-Russia State Television and Radio Broadcasting Company	2006
Carousel	Channel One Russia and All-Russia State Television and Radio Broadcasting Company	2010
Carousel International	Channel One Russia and All-Russia State Television and Radio Broadcasting Company	2010
TV Tsentr	Government of Moscow	1997
TVCI (International version of TV Tsentr)	Government of Moscow	2003
NTV	Gazprom-Media	1993
NTV Plus	Gazprom-Media	1996
TNT	Gazprom-Media	1998
NTV Canada	NTV Canada Inc.	2006
Telekanal Zvezda	Ministry of Defence	2005
MIR	10 states from CIS	1992

=== General original movies and shows ===
Name	Owner	Founded	Defunct	Notes	Formerly
StarWorld	Gazprom-Media	2001	2003 (as Fox Fun)	SD and HD only	Fun (2001-2003), Fox Fun (2003-2015), Star Fun (2015-2018)
CineMax	Gazprom-Media	2011		SD and HD only	Cinema Max (2011-2017)
CineMax 1	Gazprom-Media	2020		SD and HD only	

== State-funded ==
Name	Owner	Established
RT (in English, International)	ANO TV Novosti	2005
RT Arabic (in Arabic)	ANO TV Novosti	2007
RT en Español (in Spanish)	ANO TV Novosti	2009
RT America (in English, US)	ANO TV Novosti	2010
RT UK (in English, UK)	ANO TV Novosti	2014
RT France (in French, France)	ANO TV Novosti	2017
RTD (in English)	ANO TV Novosti	2011

== Private ==
Name	Owner	Established
3ABN Russia	Three Angels Broadcasting Network	1992
Petersburg – Channel 5	NMG (National Media Group)	1938
REN TV	NMG (National Media Group)	1997
STS	CTC Media	1996
Domashny	CTC Media	2005
TV Rain	private investors	2010
Muz-TV	UTV Russia Holding	1996
2x2	Prof-Media	1989
TV-3	Prof-Media	1994
RBC TV	RBC-TV Moskva	2003
Gulli Girl	M6 Group	2009
Tiji Russia	M6 Group	2009
Bridge	Bridge Media Group	2005
Russian Travel Guide	Bridge Media Group	2009
Russian Music Box	Bridge Media Group	2010
Viju TV1000	Modern Times Group	2003
Viju TV1000 Russkoe	Modern Times Group	2005
Viju TV1000 Action	Modern Times Group	2008
Viju History	Modern Times Group	2004
Viju Explore	Modern Times Group	2003
Viju Nature	Modern Times Group	2010
Mult	VGTRK	2014
RU.TV	RMG (Russian Media Group)	2006
O2TV	private investors	2004
A-One	private investors	2005
RTVi	private investors	2002
Cyber-Game.TV	private investors	2012

== Other countries ==
Country	Name	Owner	Notes
Abkhazia	Abaza TV	Beslan Butba	Not aligned with either the government or the opposition of Abkhazia. The station broadcasts twice a day in Russian and has a news roundup once a week.
Armenia	Public Television Company of Armenia	Armenian Government	
Azerbaijan	AzTV	Azerbaijani Government	
Belarus	Belarus TV	The Stas Nationality Television and Radio Company	
China	CGTN Russian	China Global Television Network	
Cyprus	RTCY	Russian Television Cyprus	
EU	Euronews	Euronews SA	
EU	Eurosport	TF1 Group	
Estonia	ETV+		
Georgia	First Channel (Georgian TV channel)	Georgian Government	
India	Zee Russia	Essel Group	
Israel	Channel 9	Alexander Levin	
Kyrgyzstan	Kazakh Television & Radio Corporation	Kazakhstan Government	
Kyrgyzstan	Kyrgyz Television	Kyrgyzstan Government	
Latvia	TV3 (Latvia)	TV3 Group	
Lithuania	TV3 (Lithuania)	Providence Equity Partners	
Saudi Arabia	Quran Hidayah Russian	Quran Hidayah International Network	
Tajikistan	TV Tajikistan	Tajikistan Government	
Turkmenistan	Turkmenistan (TV channel)	Turkmenistan Government	
USA, Czech Republic	Current Time TV (Настоящее Время)	RFE/RL, VOA	www.currenttime.tv Independent mass media channel, financed by the USA Congress via Broadcasting Board of Governors. By US law this channel is required to provide to the viewers and readers truthful, objective and professionally prepared materials. The US government representatives, including the head of Committee for U.S. International Broadcasting cannot influence the work of the Current Time TV.
Uzbekistan	Oʻzbekiston	Uzbekistan Government	
Vietnam	VTV4	Vietnam Television	

== See also ==
- Lists of television channels
