= Viasat =

Viasat may refer to:

- Viasat (American company) (founded 1986)
  - Viasat hack, a cyberattack on the Viasat KA-SAT network that happened in February 2022
- Viasat (Nordic television service) (founded 1991)
- Viasat Cup, 2006 Danish football tournament
- Viasat Ukraine, a Ukrainian direct broadcast satellite television distributor
- Viasat World, operator of:
  - Viasat Nature
  - Viasat Explore
  - Viasat History
- Viasat 1, a Ghanaian television channel
- Viasat 3, a Hungarian TV channel
- Viasat 6, a thematic television channel of Sony Pictures Television Networks

== See also ==
- ViaSat-1, ViaSat-2, and ViaSat-3, satellites launched by the American company
