= List of Tajik-language television channels =

In this article the list of television channels in the Tajik language is given. There are no television channels in the Dari language, which is akin to the Tajik language. Also not in the list of television channels in Persian language.

== Tajikistan ==
=== National channels ===
- Tojikiston TV
- TV Safina
- TV Bahoriston
- Varzish TV
- TV Futbol
- Jahonnamo
- Sinamo
- Shahnavoz

== Russia ==
- Safo TV (partly in Tajik)

== Uzbekistan ==
- Samarkand TV (partly in Tajik)
- STV (partly in Tajik)

== See also ==
- List of Persian-language television channels
- Lists of television channels
- Television in Afghanistan
- Television in Iran
