= Television in Tajikistan =

Television in Tajikistan began in the late 1950s, when the Tajik Soviet Socialist Republic still existed as constituent republic of the Soviet Union. The television system of Tajikistan, like other countries of the former USSR, is done using SECAM standard. In 1932, the Committee for Radiofication and Broadcasting under the Council of People's Commissars of the Tajik SSR was created, changing its name few times and known since 1978 as the State Committee of the Tajik SSR on Television and Radio Broadcasting, which launched the Tajik Radio station.

== History ==
The building of the Dushanbe television center was built on the site of the former botanical garden on Kuibyshev Street (now Bekhzod, 7 "a") on an area of 4 hectares. The first and most famous announcers of Tajik television are Rafoat Abdusalomova, Alexandra Leonova and Georgiy Mazurovsky.

The broadcasting of Stalinabad Television began on 3rd of October 1959 with announcer who began the first issue of "Akhbor" in the Tajik language announcing: "Asallomu aleikum, dear viewers! The Stalinabad television studio begins its first broadcasts!".

=== 1992-1996 ===
Following the dissolution of the Soviet Union and the dismantling of the Soviet State Television and Radio Broadcasting Company, the Second Program on the air was replaced by the RTR channel, soon the TajTV-2 channel launched by the State Television and Radio Broadcasting Company of the Tajik SSR was reformed into the State Committee of the Republic of Tajikistan on Television and Radio Broadcasting (Gosteleradio of the Republic of Tajikistan) and then renamed to the State Television and Radio Broadcasting Company of the Republic of Tajikistan. The Tajik Television channel was renamed TajTV-1, and then Shabakai Yakum before returning to the original name of Televizioni Tojikiston. Regional Television and radio broadcasting committees were later reorganized into regional television and radio broadcasting departments. In 1990, Leninabad Television was launched in Leninabad Region on a common frequency with the Second Program, in 1991, Gorno-Badakhshan Television was launched in Gorno-Badakhshan Autonomous Region, Kulyab Regional Television was launched on a common frequency with Shabakai 2 in Kulyab Region, and in 1993, Khatlon Television was launched in Khatlon Region.

=== Since 1996 ===
In 1996, the State Television and Radio Broadcasting Service of the Republic of Tajikistan was divided into Tajik Television and Tajik Radio. On September 3, 2005, instead of Shabakai 2, the TV channel Safina was launched, later transferred to a separate state institution, in 2006 the state television company TV Bahoriston was created. In 2008, the information and public television channel Jahonnamo began broadcasting, Sughd, Kulyab, Khatlon and Gorno-Badakhshan television were transferred to separate frequencies. Since March 1, 2016, two new television channels began broadcasting - Varzish TV and Sinamo, in early 2017 the Football TV channel, and in November of the same year the Shakhnavoz TV channel began broadcasting.

== List of channels ==
National channels

Tojikiston TV

TV Safina

TV Bahoriston

Varzish TV

TV Futbol

Jahonnamo

Sinamo

Shahnavoz
