= Viasat (Nordic television service) =

Satellite provider

- Industry: Pay television
- Founded: 1991
- Successor: Viaplay Group, Viasat World, Viasat Russia
- Headquarters: London, United Kingdom
- Number of employees: 110 (2026)
- Website: viasatworld.com (Worldwide) viasat.ru (Russia) viasat3.hu (Hungary)

Viasat is a satellite and pay television brand, founded in Sweden in 1991. The brand was previously owned by Modern Times Group (MTG). The channels of both companies were broadcast from London.

In 2018, MTG sourced out the television/streaming division, forming three companies: Viaplay Group (serving Nordic countries), Viasat World (Europe and Ukraine) and Viasat Russia (Russia and CIS).

In 2020, Viaplay Group formed a joint venture with Telenor to form the company Allente, that offers satellite television services in the Nordic countries. The merger was completed on April 13, 2021.

== Satellite platforms ==
The Viasat signals was received from the Astra 4A and SES-5 satellites at 4.8°E with any DVB-S receiver equipped with a NDS VideoGuard descrambling module.

Viasat (now Viaplay) does not operate its own platform outside the Nordic and Baltic countries; it relies on third party distributors in Eastern and Central Europe.

In May 2016, MTG announced the launch of Viasat Ultra HD, the first ultra-high-definition television (UHD) channel in the Nordic region and its first UHD Sports channel. The channel will feature selected live sport events especially produced in Ultra HD and launch in the autumn in Sweden, Norway, Denmark and Finland via SES-5. Viasat will also be launching an Ultra HD set-top box from Samsung and a TV-module to enable existing UHD TVs to display the channel.

== TV channels ==
=== Nordic countries ===
The Nordic operations are owned by Viaplay Group (Viasat brand is no longer used in the Nordic countries)

==== V Film and V Series ====
V Film and V Series channels are common for the four Nordic markets.

- V Film Premiere
- V Film Action
- V Film Hits
- V Film Family
- V Series

==== Sports ====
The available sports television channels differ across the Nordic markets due to the varying broadcasting rights. In Denmark most of the Viaplay-owned sports channels use the brand TV3 (TV3 Sport and TV3 Max).

- V Sport Ultra HD (Sweden, Finland, Norway, Denmark)
- V Sport Golf (Sweden, Finland, Norway, Denmark)
- V Sport Live 1-5 (Sweden, Finland, Norway, Denmark)
- V Sport 1 (Sweden, Finland, Norway)
- V Sport Extra (Sweden)
- V Sport Premium (Sweden and Finland)
- V Sport Football (Sweden and Finland)
- V Sport Vinter (Sweden and Finland)
- V Sport Motor (Sweden and Finland)
- V Sport Premier League (Norway)
- V Sport Premier League 1-4 (Norway)
- V Sport+ (Norway)
- V Sport 2 (Norway)
- V Sport 3 (Norway)
- V Sport+ Suomi (Finland)
- V Sport 1 Suomi (Finland)
- V Sport 2 Suomi (Finland)

=== Europe ===
Viasat World operates the European channels (owned by Irina Gofman):

- Viasat Nature (Central and Eastern Europe)
- Viasat Explore (Central and Eastern Europe)
- Viasat History (Central and Eastern Europe)
- Viasat Epic Drama (Central and Eastern Europe)
- Viasat True Crime (Central and Eastern Europe)
- Viasat Serial (Ukraine)
- Viasat Kino (previously TV1000 East) (Baltic states and Ukraine)
- Viasat Kino (Balkan states and Moldova)
- Viasat Kino Action (previously TV1000 Action East) (Baltic states and Ukraine)
- Viasat Kino World (previously TV1000 World Kino) (Baltic states and Ukraine)
- Viasat Kino Comedy (previously ViP Comedy East) (Baltic states and Ukraine)

Vision TV and 1+1 Media offer satellite television in Ukraine, branded Viasat Ukraine.

Russia, Central Asia, Caucasus and Moldova

These countries are served by Viasat Global (Russia). It owns many pay channels:

- Viju Nature (previously Viasat Nature)
- Viju Explore (previously Viasat Explore)
- Viju History (previously Viasat History)
- Da Vinci Russia
- Viju TV1000 (previously TV1000)
- Viju TV1000 Action (previously TV1000 Action)
- Viju TV1000 Russkoe (previously TV1000 Russkoe Kino)
- Viju TV1000 Novella
- Viju TV1000 Romantica
- Viju+ Premiere (previously ViP Premiere)
- Viju+ Megahit (previously ViP Megahit)
- Viju+ Comedy (previously ViP Comedy)
- Viju+ Serial (previously ViP Serial)
- Viju+ Planet (previously Viasat Nature/History HD)
- Viju+ Sport (previously Viasat Sport)

The streaming service Viju in Russia is operated by Viasat Global, but in the Caucasus, Central Asia, Belarus, Ukraine and Moldova, the service is controlled by V Broadkasting (Armenia).

=== Hungary ===
Antenna Group operates Viasat-branded channels in Hungary. Pay channels:

- Viasat 2
- Viasat 3
- Viasat 6

== DBS channels ==
In addition to their own channels, Viasat (now Allente) carry several third-party channels on their platform.

=== Country specific ===
Sweden:

- SVT1 (also in HD)
- SVT2 (also in HD)
- SVT24 (timesharing with Barnkanalen)
- SVT Barnkanalen (timesharing with SVT24)
- Kunskapskanalen
- TV4
- Sjuan
- TV4 Film
- TV4 Fakta
- TV4 Science fiction
- TV4 Sport
- TV4 Komedi
- TV4 Guld
- TV4 News
- Kanal 5
- Kanal 9
- Kanal 11
- TNT
- MTV Sweden
- Nickelodeon Sweden
- Comedy Central Sweden

Denmark:

- DR1
- DR2
- DR3 (HD)
- DR K
- DR Ramasjang
- DR Ultra
- TV 2 Denmark
- TV 2 Charlie
- TV 2 Film
- TV 2 News
- TV 2 Zulu
- Kanal 4
- Kanal 5
- 6'eren
- 7'eren
- 24 Nordjyske
- MTV Denmark

Norway:

- NRK1
- NRK2
- NRK3/NRK Super
- TV 2 Norge
- TV 2 Filmkanalen
- TV 2 Nyhetskanalen
- TV 2 Sport
- TV3 (Norway)
- TVNorge
- FEM
- MAX
- VOX
- MTV Norway

Slovakia:

- RTVS

Lithuania:

- Lietuvos Rytas TV
- LRT Televizija
- LRT Lituanica
- LNK
- TV1
- BTV
- Sport1

=== Transnational ===
- Animal Planet Europe (only in the Baltics)
- BBC World News
- Cartoon Network (6.00-21.00, time-sharing with TCM Europe)
- CNBC Nordic
- CNN International
- Discovery Channel Europe (only in the Baltics)
- Disney Channel Scandinavia
- E!
- Euronews
- Boomerang (Nordic) (launched on 30 September 2010 as a 24-hour channel)
- The God Channel
- MTV Live HD
- Nat Geo Scandinavia
- Nat Geo HD
- Nat Geo Wild
- Nickelodeon Scandinavia (6.00-18.00, time-sharing with VH1 Europe)
- Nick Jr. (Sweden)
- NHK World
- NTV Mir (only in the Baltics)
- Playboy TV (time-sharing with Viasat Nature/Crime)
- Disney Junior Scandinavia (time-sharing with Viasat Film Drama)
- Ren TV (only in the Baltics)
- RTR Planeta (only in Estonia and Lithuania)
- RT
- Spice Platinum (time-sharing with Viasat Explorer)
- Spice Private (also known as Viasat Ticket 2 Erotic)
- STS International (only in the Baltics)
- Disney XD Scandinavia (defunct on December 31, 2020)
- TCM Nordic (Turner Classic Movies) (21.00-6.00, time-sharing with Cartoon Network Nordic)
- VH1 Europe (18.00-6.00, time-sharing with Nick Jr Sweden)
- CBS Reality
- MTV Europe
- Penthouse HD1
- Penthouse HD2
- Space Channel 3D

== Former channels ==
Channel	Start	Close	
TV1000 2		2004-09	Replaced by TV1000 Plus One
TV1000 3		2004-09	Replaced by TV1000 Family
Cinema		2004-9	Replaced by TV1000 Action
Cinema 2		2004-09	Replaced by TV1000 Nordic
Cinema 3		2004-09	Replaced by TV1000 Classic
The History Channel Scandinavia		2004-11	Closed down, replaced by Viasat History
Viasat Sport 24	2005-04	2006-12	Replaced by Viasat Golf
Viasat Sport 2	2004-02	2009-01	Replaced by Viasat Fotboll/Viasat Sport (Norway) and Viasat Motor in Sweden and Norway, and Viasat Sport Baltic and Viasat Golf in the Baltics.
Viasat Sport 3	2004-02	2009-01	Replaced by Viasat Fotboll/Viasat Sport (Norway) and Viasat Motor in Sweden and Norway, and Viasat Sport Baltic and Viasat Golf in the Baltics.
Hallmark Channel Scandilux		2009-09	
Jetix Scandinavia	2005	2009-09	Replaced by Disney XD
REN TV Baltic		2010	
Pervyj Baltyjskij Kanal		2010	
TV1000 Plus One	2004-09	2010-08	Closed down.
TV1000 Poland	2007-03	2013-01	

== World record ==
The live 3D broadcast of the 2011 UEFA Champions League final match between Manchester United and Barcelona was provided by Viasat in 3D format in Gothenburg (Sweden). The football match was broadcast on EKTA screen. This Ukrainian produced 3D LED TV made The Guinness Book of World Records.

== See also ==
- List of Danish television channels
- List of Estonian television channels
- List of Finnish television channels
- List of Latvian television channels
- List of Lithuanian television channels
- List of Norwegian television channels
- List of Swedish television channels
