= TV1000 =

TV1000 was a brand of premium TV channels operated by Viasat World and Viaplay Group (previously by Modern Times Group).

TV1000 may refer to:

- V Film, a brand of Nordic movie channels formerly known as TV1000 and Viasat Film
  - V Series, a Swedish TV channel formerly known as TV1000 Drama
  - Viasat Film HD, a defunct Nordic movie channel formerly known as TV1000 HD
- Viju TV1000, a brand of movie channels available in Russia and CIS
  - Viju TV1000 Russkoe, a Russian movie channel
- Viasat Kino, a Baltic movie channel, formerly known as the Baltic feed of TV1000 East
  - Viasat Kino Action, formerly known as TV1000 Action East
- TV1000 Poland, a defunct Polish movie channel
