= TV Bahoriston =

State-owned television channel of Tajikistan

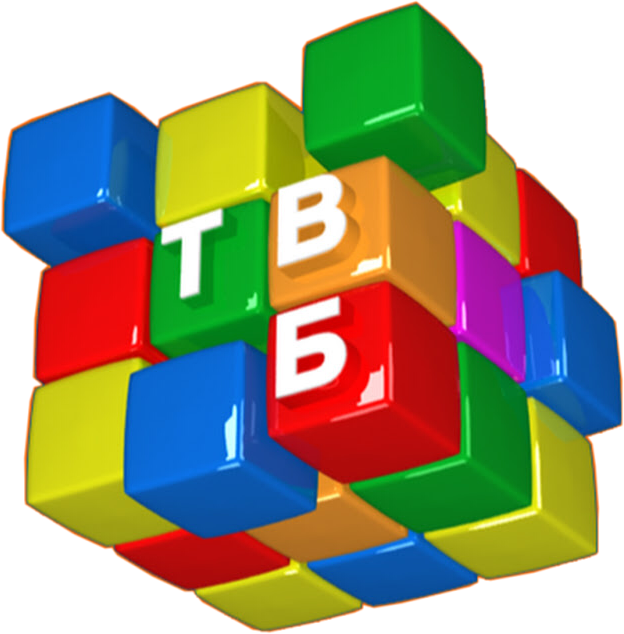
- Country: Tajikistan
- Broadcast area: Tajikistan; United States
- Headquarters: Dushanbe, Tajikistan

Programming
- Languages: Tajik; Russian
- Picture format: 16:9 HDTV

Ownership
- Owner: State Institution “Children and Youth Television – Bahoriston”

History
- Launched: September 4, 2006; 20 years ago

Links
- Website: Official website

TV Bahoriston (Tajik: Телевизиони «Баҳористон», "Springtime") is a Tajik state television channel aimed at children. The channel was founded in 2006 and airs for fifteen hours a day (7am to 10pm).

== History ==
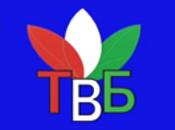
Launch logo of the channel, used from 2006 to 2009

The government announced the channel in July 2006 with an initial tentative launch date of September 8. Coverage area was initially limited to Dushanbe and adjacent districts, and would broadcast from a building adjacent to the one used by the State Television and Radio Company (in charge of the broadcasting infrastructure), however there were also plans to expand the signal to Qurghonteppa and Khujand. The state company to operate the channel was founded on August 1, 2006, per Government Resolution n.º 350. The channel launched at 4pm on September 4, coinciding with the celebrations for the fifteenth anniversary of Tajikistan's independence. In an initial phase, it was expected to operate six to eight hours a day, in Tajik and Russian, but also expected part of its programming to be in English too. On opening day, president Emomali Rahmon cut the ribbon and pressed the button on the operational console to launch the channel. The first program seen was the launch ceremony, beginning with a short video on Tajikistan's achievements since independence and then a live speech from Rahmon, congratulating the nation for its opening. He then had a special interview with children in one of TVB's studios.

In April 2007, it received part of a US$500,000 grant to digitize its equipment, the vast majority of which was used for upgrading Radioi Tojikiston. As part of the plan, TVB would begin having a satellite uplink to beam its signal nationwide, and 25 low-duty transmitters were to be installed to increase the coverage area, especially in Rasht. The channel did not have enough coverage in some areas in 2009, particularly among the border with Uzbekistan, coupled with the fact that Channel 1 did not air children's programming, causing locals to watch children's programs on Uzbek channel Yoshlar instead. This caused concerm among some parents. As of the end of 2009, the terrestrial network covered 72,05% of Tajikistan. In 2011, 17 transmitters were being installed in the Sughd region for the channel to increase its over-the-air coverage area.

By early December 2014, it started showing movies in English without any translation two days a week, mirroring a then-recent pilot project made by Channel 1. On June 19, 2015, Dilafruz Amirzoda was appointed head of the channel, replacing Zevar Davlatzoda, who moved to TV Safina. Since November 26, 2021, Hamza Mahmoudi takes the role.

== See also ==
- List of Russian-language television channels
