= Anatoly Lysenko =

Russian journalist (1937–2021)

- Анатолий Лысенко
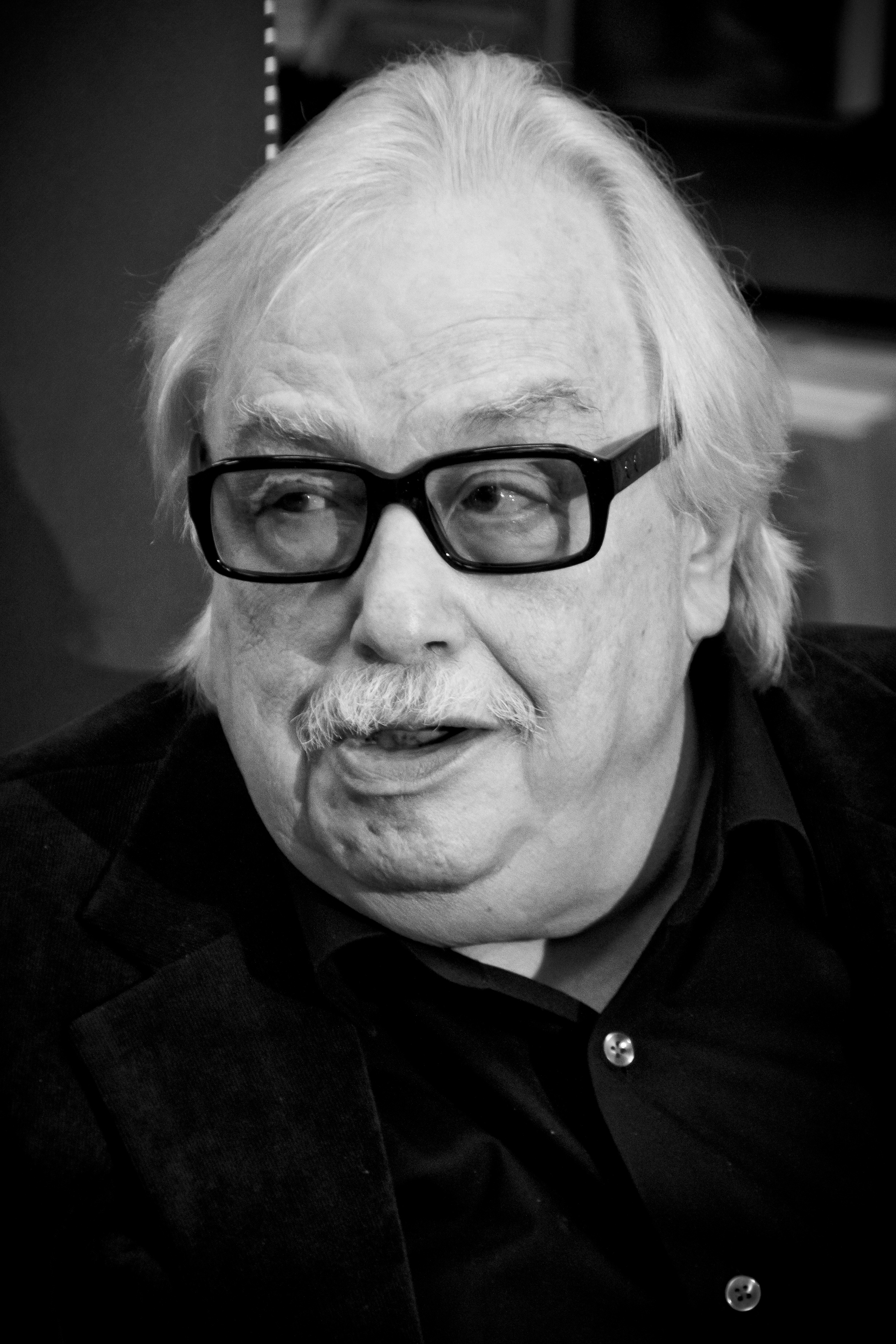
- Born: Anatoly Grigorievich Lysenko; 14 April 1937; Vinnytsia, Ukrainian SSR, Soviet Union
- Died: 20 June 2021 (aged 84); Moscow, Russia
- Resting place: Troyekurovskoye Cemetery
- Occupations: director, tv host, tv producer, journalist, editor
- Years active: 1959–2021
- Spouse: Valentina Lysenko
- Children: 2
- Anatoly Lysenko's voice Lysenko on the Echo of Moscow program, 12 April 2007

Anatoly Grigorievich Lysenko (Russian: Анатолий Григорьевич Лысенко; 14 April 1937 – 20 June 2021) was a Soviet and Russian television figure, journalist, director, producer. Honored Artist of Russia, laureate of the State Prize of the USSR. On 18 July 2012 he was appointed general director of Public Television of Russia.

== Early life ==
Lysenko was born on 14 April 1937, in Vinnytsia, Ukrainian Soviet Socialist Republic, USSR. The family moved to Moscow five days after his birth and Lysenko learned to read at the age of three. His father served there as deputy head of a rail line. After he was expelled from school in 9th grade, he independently prepared for exams in the reading room of the Lenin Library; he passed six subjects with excellent marks.

During his school years he was fond of chemistry. In one chemistry experiment, his flask exploded, scarring Lysenko's face and causing him to lose sight for over a month. In 1960, he graduated from the Faculty of Economics of the Moscow Institute of Railway Engineers, after which he graduated from the All-Union Correspondence Institute of Railway Engineers.

== Career ==
Since 1987, Lysenko directed Vzglyad, which in many ways changed both Soviet television and the atmosphere in the country. He was a member of the council for the award of the Russian Government's media awards since 2013.

== Personal life ==
Lysenko's wife, Valentina Efimovna Lysenko (born 1943), is an engineer. Their daughter Mariana Anatolievna Lysenko (born 1970), is a doctor. Their son, Viktor Lysenko, is an international journalist.

== Death ==
Lysenko died on 20 June 2021 "after a long illness" and complications from COVID-19. A memorial ceremony took place at the Ostankino Technical Center on 23 June, after which Lysenko was buried in Troyekurovskoye Cemetery.

== Awards ==
- USSR State Prize (1978)
- Order of Friendship (1996)
- Medal in Commemoration of the 850th Anniversary of Moscow (1997)
- Honored Artist of the Russian Federation (1999)

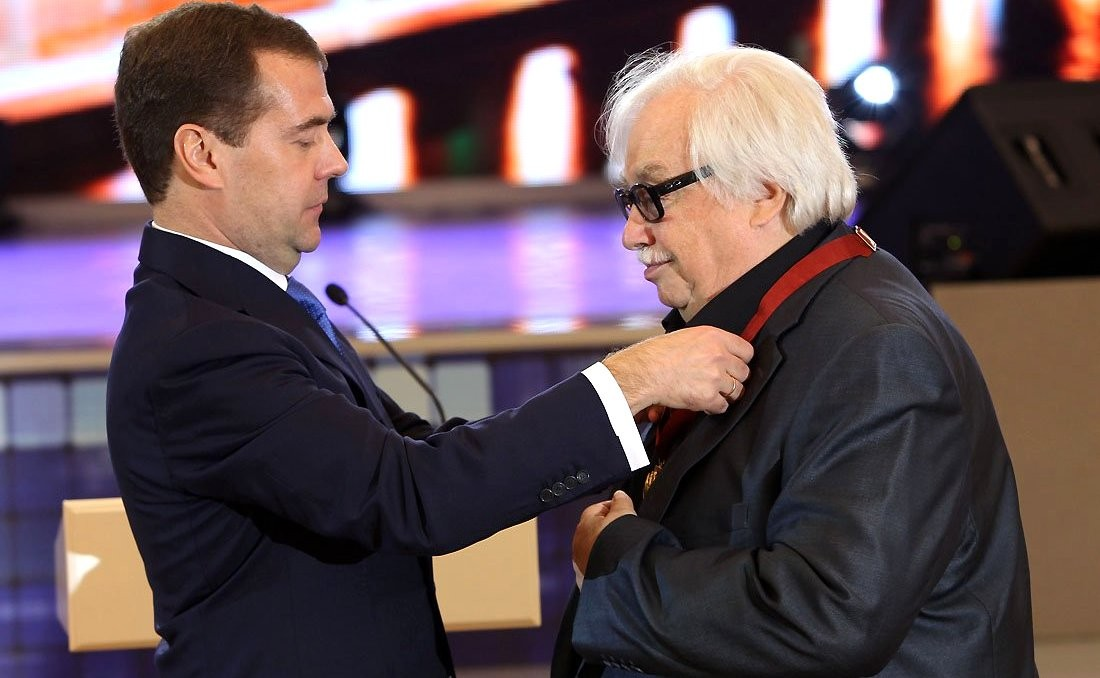
With Dmitry Medvedev, 17 November 2011

- Order For Merit to the Fatherland 3rd class (2011), 4th class (2006)
- Prize of the Government of the Russian Federation in 2014 in the field of mass media for personal contribution to the development of the mass media
- Order of Honour (2016)
