= SF-kanalen =

- Broadcast area: Sweden, Norway, Finland and Denmark

Programming
- Picture format: 576i 16:9

Ownership
- Owner: TV4 AB (Schibsted)
- Sister channels: TV4; Sjuan; TV12; TV4 Film; TV4 Fakta; TV4 Guld; TV4 Hits; TV4 Stars; TV4 Sportkanalen; TV4 Fotboll; TV4 Hockey; TV4 Motor; TV4 Tennis; TV4 Sport Live

History
- Launched: 1 October 2009

SF-kanalen is a Scandinavian television channel, which shows movies from the library of SF Studios. It is broadcast to Sweden as a part of the TV4 Play+ package.

The channel launched on 1 October 2009 and would broadcast 24 hours per day from the start. From 1 November 2009, it will broadcast terrestrially in Sweden between 6 a.m. and 6 p.m. on Weekdays and between 6 a.m. and 12 p.m. on Weekends, sharing its channel space with Canal+ Sport 1.

The SF brand had previously been used by a pay channel called SF Succé, which operated between 1989 and 1991.
