= SF Succé =

- Broadcast area: Sweden

Ownership
- Owner: Svensk Filmindustri; Marieberg; Warner Bros. Canal Plus

History
- Launched: December 1, 1989; 35 years ago
- Closed: September 1, 1991; 33 years ago
- Replaced by: TV1000

SF Succé was a Swedish premium movie channel that operated in the late 1980s and early 1990s. It was owned by Warner Bros. (whose parent company Warner Communications was in the process of merging with Time Inc. to form Time Warner, now Warner Bros. Discovery), Canal+ (France's pay TV channel, in turn owned by what was then Compagnie générale des eaux (CGE), now Vivendi, now spun off as Canal+ S.A.), Svensk Filmindustri and Marieberg (a newspaper publisher), which each held a 25 percent share.

The channel went on air from a satellite operated by Intelsat, specifically Intelsat VA-F11, on December 1, 1989. At launch, a subscription cost 120 Swedish krona and the channel was on-air for about 60 hours per week, mostly in the evenings and weekend mornings.

In 1991, it was purchased and subsequently merged with TV1000. TV1000's owners, Kinnevik, would own 75 percent of the company, while SF Succé's owners got the remaining 25 percent. The merged channel launched on September 1, 1991, under the name TV1000 - Succékanalen.

The SF brand makes a return as a television channel in Sweden on October 1, 2009, when Svensk Filmindustri and TV1000's competitor Canal+ together launch SF-kanalen, a channel with only Swedish films. Both Svensk Filmindustri and the Nordic Canal+ branch are now owned by the same company.
