= Jahonnamo =

State-owned television channel of Tajikistan

- Country: Tajikistan
- Broadcast area: Tajikistan; United States
- Headquarters: Dushanbe, Tajikistan

Programming
- Languages: Tajik; Russian; English
- Picture format: 16:9 HDTV

Ownership
- Owner: State Institution “Jahonnamo”

History
- Launched: November 5, 2008; 17 years ago

Links
- Website: Official website

Jahonnamo (Tajik: Ҷаҳоннамо, "The World Around Us") is a Tajik news channel owned by the state. The channel airs news and current affairs programs in Tajik, Russian and English languages.

== History ==
On July 17, 2008, the Tajik government announced the launch of its fourth national television network, Jahonnamo, with a tentative launch date set for September. The channel subsequently launched on November 5. At first, the channel had over-the-air coverage in 60% of the country's territory, while its equipment cost US$320,000 to purchase. The channel's first head was Abdumajid Usmonov, formerly deputy director of TV Safina. In January 2009, it examined the possibility of opening of a reporting unit in Qatar.

The channel was uplinked to the LVI-1 satellite in May 2009. By September, over-the-air coverage had increased to 75%, hoping to reach 90% by December. It already had offices in Kulop and Qurghonteppa and planned to open in Badakhshon and Sughd.

In June 2016, Jahonnamo announced that it would open an overseas reporting bureau in the United States, also planning to cover reports related to the Tajik community there. On January 30, 2018, Jahonnamo started HD broadcasts. On July 5, 2024, Jahonnamo signed a memorandum of cooperation with China Media Group.

== See also ==
- List of Russian-language television channels
