= V Film =

Nordic television movies channel

- Country: Sweden
- Broadcast area: Nordic countries

Programming
- Picture format: 4:3 (576i, SDTV); 16:9 (HDTV)

Ownership
- Owner: Viaplay Group
- Sister channels: V Classics; V Crime; V Series; V Sport

History
- Launched: 27 August 1989 (as TV1000); 3 March 2012 (as Viasat Film); 1 June 2020 (as V Film)
- Replaced: SF Succé (from 1991)
- Closed: 3 March 2012 (as TV1000)
- Former names: TV1000 (1989–2012); Viasat Film (2012–2020)

V Film is a group of premium movie channels broadcasting in the Nordic countries, owned by Viaplay Group.

== History ==
V Film was started by Kinnevik on 27 August 1989 as TV1000, using one of the sixteen transponders on Astra 1A, the first Astra satellite.

TV1000 logo between 1991 and 1995.

In June 1991, TV1000 announced that the channel would merge with another pay movie channel called SF Succé. This gave the channel a content boost with several Swedish films. It also made TV1000 more able to compete with FilmNet, the leading premium channel at the time.

On 1 September 1991, the merger took place. The name of the merged channel was initially announced to be "TV1000 Succékanalen", although this was not used on air. As TV1000 was much larger than SF Succé, Kinnevik owned 75 percent of the new channel, while SF Succé's owners owned 25 percent.

When Kinnevik spun off its media division into the Modern Times Group (MTG) in 1997, TV1000 was not included. Kinnevik was eventually able to buy out the rest of the owners, and TV1000 became a part of MTG in 2000.

In February 1995, a sister channel called TV1000 Cinema, or just "Cinema", launched. Cable distributors were initially hesitant to offer the new channel, which led MTG to close down another channel called FilmMax in November 1995 and attempt to replace it with Cinema.

On 15 April 2000, when Viasat launched its digital platform, TV1000 and Cinema got two time-shift channels, each broadcasting the content with one- and two-hour delays.

On 1 September 2004, TV1000 closed down Cinema and three of the time-shift channels, replacing them with four themed movie channels. The line-up would then be TV1000, TV1000 Plus One (one hour time-shift of TV1000), TV1000 Family, TV1000 Action, TV1000 Nordic and TV1000 Classic.

In early 2008, TV1000 launched its first high-definition channel. Called TV1000 HD, it was a simulcast of the main TV1000 channel for the Nordic countries.

On 16 February 2009, an eighth TV1000 channel, TV1000 Drama, was launched in Sweden, Denmark, Norway and Finland. At the same time, the other TV1000 channels had their logos replaced by a new design.

On 1 August 2010, the one-hour timeshift of the main TV1000 channel TV1000 Plus One was closed down.

On 2 January 2012, it was announced that the TV1000 channels would be rebranded as Viasat Film starting from 3 March 2012 in the Nordic region. TV1000 is still available in Central Europe as TV1000 East.

On 23 April 2014, Viasat changed its lineup of movie channels; Viasat Film Nordic closed and was replaced by Viasat Film Comedy. Nordic films were thereafter included in the programming of other channels and Transmission time for Viasat Film Action and Viasat Film Classic was reduced to evening hours only. Additionally, Viasat Film Drama HD and Viasat Film Action HD began simulcasting with Nat Geo Wild HD during the daytime on the Viasat satellite platform.

On 10 November 2015, Viasat again changed its lineup. Viasat Film Classic and Viasat Film Drama were closed and replaced by Viasat Film Hits (broadcasting contemporary and classic films) and Viasat Series (broadcasting new and classic television series). The network also returned to showing series and children's programs, as it had done in the 1990s under the TV1000 brand. Viasat Film Family removed its daytime Disney Jr. programming, and Viasat Film Comedy began broadcasting classic comedy series during the day. Additionally, the main Viasat Film channel was renamed Viasat Film Premiere.

In 2018, the TV department of MTG was split off into Nordic Entertainment Group.

On 1 June 2020, the Viasat Film channels were renamed V Film as part of a major corporate rebranding.

On 7 May 2025, TV1000 was renamed Viasat Kino in Romania, Croatia, Serbia, and Bulgaria.

=== Transmission ===
TV1000 was previously transmitted using D2-MAC and encrypted using the EuroCrypt system. It was available originally via the Astra 1A satellite, and later via the Intelsat 707 satellite (where TV1000 Cinema was also available via the co-located TV-Sat2 satellite). The Scandinavian version of V Film is transmitted digitally and encrypted in the VideoGuard system (after previously using the widely hacked Viaccess system) within the Viasat package on the Astra 4A satellite.

== Viasat Kino CEE ==
=== Viasat Kino East ===
In March 2003, TV1000 East began broadcasting in Russia, Ukraine, Belarus, Moldova, Kazakhstan, Georgia, Estonia, Latvia, and Lithuania.

In October 2005, a channel broadcasting only Russian movies called TV1000 Russkoe Kino (ТВ1000 Русское Кино) was launched.

In April 2008, TV1000 Premium was launched.

=== Viasat Kino Balkan ===
On 18 November 2005, TV1000 Balkan was launched in Romania, Bulgaria, Serbia, Croatia, Slovenia, North Macedonia, Bosnia and Herzegovina, and Montenegro. The channel aired Swedish erotic films at night until 2015.

=== TV1000 Poland ===
On 5 March 2007, TV1000 Poland was launched.

On 15 January 2013, the channel closed.

== See also ==
- V Series
- Viasat Kino
