= Central Television and Radio Studio of the Russian Ministry of Defence =

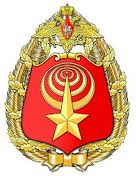
- Country: Russia
- First air date: 1993
- Broadcast area: Russia
- Nation: Russia
- Established: 15 August 1992

Central Television and Radio Studio of the Russian Ministry of Defence (Russian: Центральная телевизионная и радиовещательная студия Министерства обороны Российской Федерации) (TSTRS) is the television arm of the Russian Ministry of Defence and the main production unit of the Zvezda television channel.

== History ==
The establishment of the TSTRS was approved on August 15, 1992. The first chief of the studio was Colonel Alexander Jakubowski. The TSTRS includes the broadcast studio, broadcast audio studios, the television and radio networks broadcasting systems department, and the technical center.

Since 1993 the TSTRS has broadcast the news programs News, Today and Results, as well as in the military program Michael Leszczynski's Polygon on channel Ostankino. All use the logo VoenTV. The first episode of the news program The Military Courier aired in the summer of 1993.

In December 1993 the channel TV-6 has aired the infotainment music program TSTRS Army Shop, written and presented by Alexander Ilyin; since January 1994 the program has appeared on the channel Ostankino. Starting in September 1995 Channel One Russia began to show the weekly program I serve Russia. The first program was presented by the managing editor Alexander Minakov.

On August 7, 2006, at a frequency of 95.6 FM, the national radio station Zvexda began broadcasting as Radio Slavyanka.
