= Viju TV1000 Russkoe =

Russian movie channel

Viju TV1000 Russkoe Viju TV1000 Русское
- Broadcast area: Russia, CIS states

Programming
- Language: Russian
- Picture format: 16:9 576i SDTV; 1080i HDTV

Ownership
- Owner: Viju Russia (National Media Group)

History
- Launched: October 1, 2005
- Former names: TV1000 Russkoe Kino (2005—2023)

Links
- Website: Official site

Viju TV1000 Russkoe is a television channel broadcasting Russian language movies owned by Viju Russia. The channel is available in Russia and Commonwealth of Independent States.

The channel launched on October 1, 2005, in the Baltics, Russia, Ukraine, and other CIS states, broadcasting from both the Viasat platform in the Baltics and cable systems in the region. It was the fifth pay channel from Viasat in the region after TV1000 East, Viasat Explorer, Viasat History and Viasat Sport.

In the autumn of 2008, the channel was added to the "Russian Mega Pack" on the DISH Network in the United States. As of 2018, it is no longer available on Dish.

In 2009 the channel became available through Time Warner Cable (Now Spectrum) in the New York City Region, and the Southern California area, including Los Angeles. It subsequently launched on Xfinity cable in 2012.

On February 28, 2022, the channel stopped operating in the Baltic States and was replaced by TV1000 World Kino, it was the decision of TV3 Group, after the beginning of the Russian invasion of Ukraine.

In March 2023, TV1000 Russkoe Kino rebranded as Viju TV1000 Russkoe.

== See also ==
- TV1000 (disambiguation)
