= TV Safina =

State-owned television channel of Tajikistan

- Country: Tajikistan
- Broadcast area: Tajikistan; United States
- Headquarters: Dushanbe, Tajikistan

Programming
- Languages: Tajik; Russian
- Picture format: 16:9 HDTV

Ownership
- Owner: State Enterprise "TV Safina"

History
- Launched: September 3, 2005; 21 years ago

Links
- Website: Official website

TV Safina (Tajik: Телевизиони «Сафина», romanized: Televizioni "Safina", "Safina" as in "ship") is one of the national television channels of Tajikistan. The station is owned by the state company of the same name.

== History ==
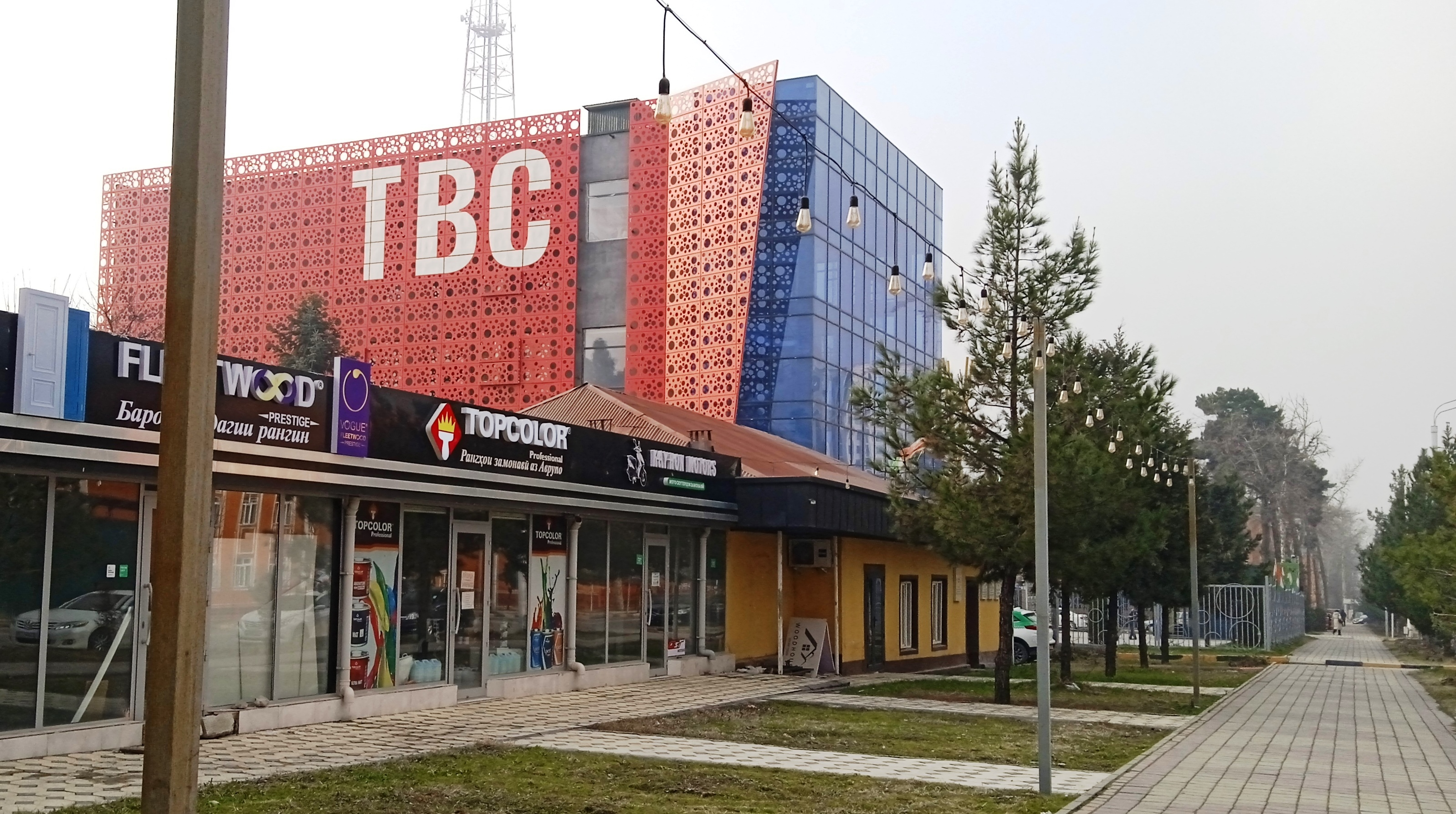
TV Safina's current building

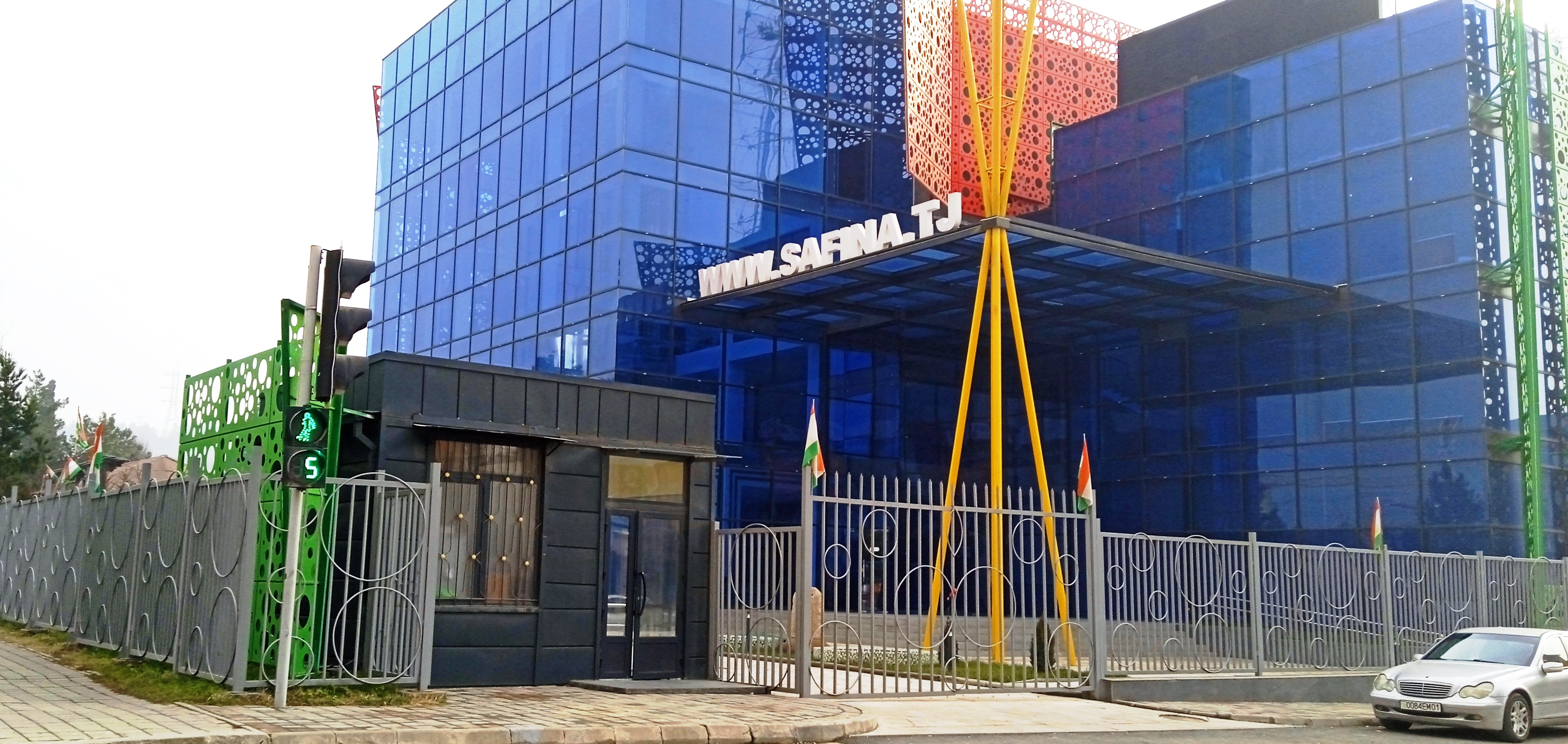
TV Safina's current building (entrance)

The government created the state enterprise to operate TV Safina on August 22, 2005 under Government Resolution N.º 308, beginning operations on September 3, 2005 at 8am, with president of Tajikistan Emomali Rahmon taking part in the founding ceremony and pushing the button to commence its service. The station was headquartered in a building erected in 1933 during Soviet rule by architect Sergey Gutin, which was used for the Gorky winter cinema, later as the Tajik offices of Soyuzmultfilm and Tojikfilm, and, during the 1960s, the State Philharmonic Society. The goal of the channel was to enhance information within Tajikistan and to promote its ten-year plan for social and economic development, while its line-up was mostly cultural in nature, being comparable to the Russian Culture channel: limited politics, and reduced coverage of official proceedings in its news service.

Initially, in addition to the main facilities in Dushanbe, it had offices in Khujand and Qurghonteppa. On June 1, 2006, it opened an additional reporting bureau in Kulob, catering to the eastern side of Khatlon province, and planning to open a further one in Khorog. Circa September 6, 2006, the channel was now receivable in Khorog using a TVT relay station, and had plans to expand its over-the-air signal to 99,5% of Gorno-Badakhshon. By January 2007, it was receivable by 55.8% of the Tajik population, second only to TVT at 98.5%, but ahead of TV Bahoriston at 54%.

On November 4, 2008, TV Safina received an aid grant from the Japanese government to develop its infrastructure. In January 2009, TV Safina's coverage area was to be improved when Teleradiocom announced the installation of two television transmitters with help from a Ukrainian company, aiming to improve its reception in Kulob.

In late November 2023, TV Safina moved to a new, up-to-date building, located close to Shopping Center Dushanbe. Initially, it was reported that the extant facilities, featuring Soviet-era artwork (Shashmaqom), that housed the channel since its launch would be demolished. Information emerged in mid-February that a new shopping mall was to be built in the location.

== See also ==
- List of Russian-language television channels
