= Mir (television company) =

TV channel in CIS and Baltic region

Mir Мир
- Country: Russia
- Broadcast area: CIS nations
- Headquarters: Moscow, Russia

Ownership
- Owner: International Radio and Television Company "MIR" (Commonwealth of Independent States)

History
- Launched: 9 October 1992

Links
- Website: mir24.tv

Availability

Terrestrial
- Digital terrestrial television: Channel 18 (Russia); Channel 8 (Belarus); Channel 10 (Kazakhstan); Channel 17 (Armenia)

Mir (Russian: Мир, IPA: [ˈmʲir]; lit. 'peace' or 'world'), known formally as the Intergovernmental Television and Radio Company "Mir" (Russian: Межгосударственная телерадиокомпания «Мир») is a multinational public television broadcaster, broadcasting programs in Russian and featuring programming from all the countries of the Commonwealth of Independent States.

== History ==
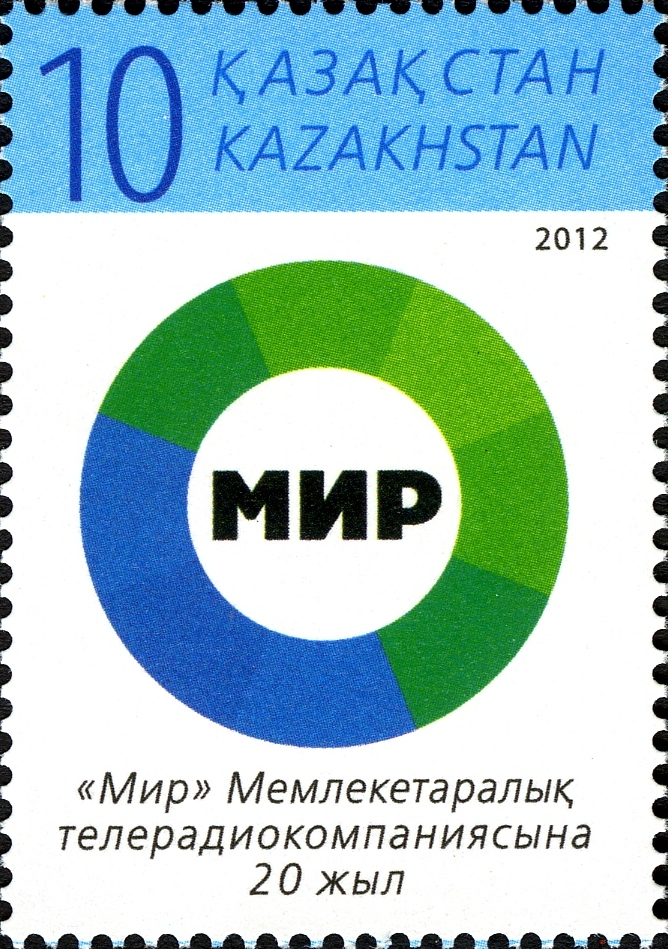
A postage stamp of Kazakhstan, dedicated to the 20th anniversary of Mir.

The decision to establish an international broadcasting company was signed on 20 March 1992 in Kyiv by the presidents Boris Yeltsin, Stanislav Shushkevich, Leonid Kravchuk, Nursultan Nazarbayev, Askar Akayev, Rahmon Nabiyev, Levon Ter-Petrosyan and Mircea Snegur. The idea for Mir was conceived by President Nazarbayev. 9 October 1992 and is considered the starting point of the company's history, when an agreement was signed in Bishkek on the establishment of Mir. The co-founders of the television and radio company were ten former USSR countries, namely Russia, Belarus, Kazakhstan, Kyrgyzstan, Tajikistan, Uzbekistan, Azerbaijan, Armenia, Georgia and Moldova (Latvia, Lithuania, Estonia, Turkmenistan and Ukraine were absent from the former union republics). On 24 December 1993 in Ashgabat, an agreement was signed on international legal guarantees for the unhindered and independent implementation of the activities of Mir. In May 1997, the broadcasting of the Mir radio station in Belarus began. In August 2005, broadcasting began in the Kyrgyz Republic, and since August 2010 it has been conducted in Russia. The first president of Mir was Kazakh journalist Gadilbek Shalakhmetov, who performed his duties until 2002. The broadcasting company has changed three logos, the current one is the fourth in a row. The logo was modernized with minor changes in 2006, 2008 and 2012.

== Programs ==
=== Mir Channel ===
The Mir TV channel introduces viewers to the modern life and history of the countries of the former Soviet Union, and forms cultural, social and economic ties. In October 2014, Mir television was excluded from Uzbekistan and the following month, stopped broadcasting in Turkmenistan. In March 2015, it switched to the 16:9 aspect ratio. On 9 September 2018, the broadcast of the Mir in high definition HD was launched. To date, it has facilitated interviews with the leaders of CIS nations (e.g. Ilham Aliyev, Alexander Lukashenko, and Vladimir Putin).

=== Mir Premium ===
Mir Premium was the high definition television channel. The channel had a large collection of films and TV shows, including Western and Russian cinema. Its official broadcasting began on New Year's Day in 2015. The channel ceased broadcasting on 1 January 2021.

=== Mir 24 ===
Mir 24 is an informational, cultural and country studies television channel that began broadcasting on 1 January 2013. Live broadcasts of summits, press conferences and speeches by top officials of the state, as well as national and religious holidays and major sporting events appear on the channel. The draft of the 24-hour channel had already been approved by the prime ministers of the CIS countries during the meeting in Yalta on 28 September 2012.

On 28 February 2022, in response to the 2022 Russian invasion of Ukraine, Latvia banned the retransmission of Mir 24 in its territory for five years due to a perceived threat to its national security.

=== Radio "Mir" ===
Radio "Mir" is the road radio station of the company. Every half-hour on the air, exclusive news from correspondents in the CIS countries and Russian broadcasting cities takes place. The basis of music policy is songs of the 1990-2000s in Russia. Educational, art, talk shows, are available on the program.

=== Information and Analytical Portal MIR24.TV ===
The Information and Analytical Internet Portal MIR24.TV began its work in January 2011. News from the CIS countries and the world attract more than 220 thousand people daily, and the monthly number of views exceeds 9 million.

== Geography of broadcasting ==
Broadcasting of Mir is carried out on the territory of all countries of the former Soviet Union (the exceptions are non-members of the CIS, namely Turkmenistan, Ukraine, Latvia, Estonia, Lithuania, and Georgia). In July 2013, Mir began broadcasting in Russia as part of the second digital television multiplex.

Technical coverage of the Mir channel:

- On-air analog broadcasting (10 million people)
- Digital broadcasting (99 million people)
- Mobile, cable and ip-broadcasting (81 million)
- Satellite broadcasting (41 million people)

The total technical coverage includes more than 115 million people. The broadcasting the Mir 24 is available to viewers in 22 countries, including South Africa. Beginning on 13 January 2014, Mir 24 TV channel will be re-transmitted on the frequency of Mir television channel on weekdays from 6:00 to 9:15 in the morning information block 180 minutes.

In February 2015, by decision of the State Committee for Television and Radio-broadcasting of Ukraine, broadcasting of a television channel in Ukraine was suspended. On 18 October 2017, a test HD broadcast was launched. The Mir Premium TV channel is available to viewers in most of the former USSR.

Radio Mir broadcasts on the territory of Kyrgyzstan, Russia, Latvia, and Radio Mir Belarus on the territory of Belarus. It reaches the following audience:

- Russia – 25.9 million people.
- Kyrgyzstan – 1.7 million people. (Bishkek)
- Radio "Mir-Belarus" – 7 million people.
- The total potential audience of broadcasting is 34 million people.

== Leadership ==
- Radik Batyrshin – Chairman of the company (since 2007)
- Dmitry Peskov – chairman of the board of directors (since February 2008)

== Criticism ==
In July 2020, the Foreign Ministry of Turkmenistan criticized the review of the weather forecast on the air of the Mir TV. The Turkmen foreign ministry stressed that the report of Azamat Ziyaev, the own correspondent of Mir 24 in Tajikistan, does not stand up to criticism. In addition, the government agency called him "politically short-sighted".

== See also ==
- List of European television stations
- Television in Russia
- List of Russian-language television channels
