= V Sport Golf =

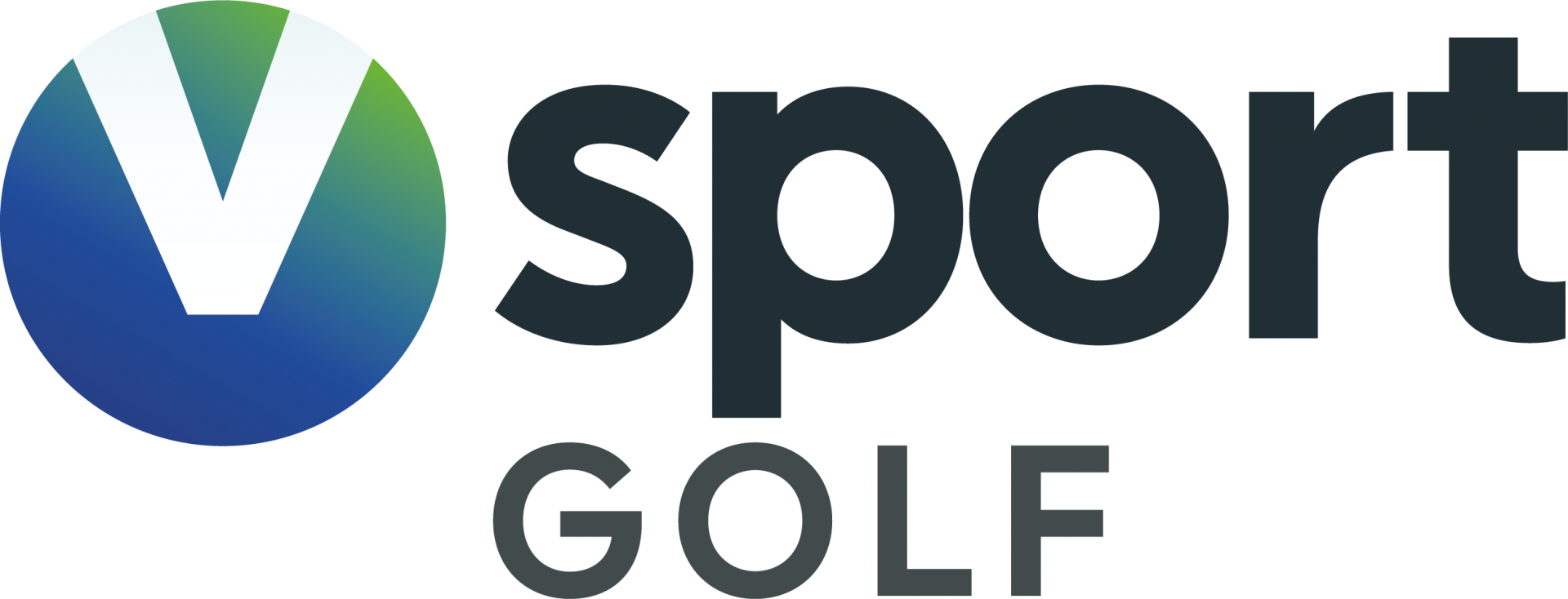
- Broadcast area: Denmark; Finland; Norway; Sweden; Estonia; Lithuania; Russia
- Network: V Sport
- Headquarters: London, United Kingdom

Ownership
- Owner: Viaplay Group

History
- Launched: January 2007
- Replaced: Viasat Sport 24
- Former names: Viasat Golf (2007–2020)

Links
- Website: Viasat Golf (in Norwegian); Viasat Golf (in Swedish)

Availability

Terrestrial
- Digita (Finland): Channel 67 (SD)
- DNA (Finland): Channel 123 (HD)

V Sport Golf is a pan-Nordic television channel dedicated to broadcasting golf tournaments and golf-related programmes.

The channel was launched in January 2007 after MTG had acquired many rights for live broadcasting of golf tournaments, such as the US PGA Tour, the PGA European Tour, the European Challenge Tour, the European Seniors Tour, the Scandinavian Masters, the Sunshine Tour, the Ryder Cup, the World Golf Championships, the Seve Trophy, the Australasian Tour and the Southern Africa Tour. Viasat Golf took the space that had been used for Viasat Sport 24. Golf tournaments that had been aired on Viasat Sport 1 and SportN were moved to Viasat Golf.

In 2020, the channel was renamed V Sport Golf.

== Logos ==
First Viasat Golf logo used 2007-2008
