= Public Television of Russia =

Russian public television broadcaster

Public Television of Russia Общественное Телевидение России
- Country: Russia
- Broadcast area: Russia and Worldwide
- Headquarters: Moscow, Russia

Programming
- Picture format: 576i (SDTV) 16:9; 1080i (HDTV) 16:9

Ownership
- Owner: Russian Government

History
- Launched: 19 May 2013

Links
- Website: otr-online.ru

Public Television of Russia (PTR, OTR, Russian: Общественное Телевидение России, ОТР, romanized: Obshchestvennoe Televidenie Rossii, OTR) is a Russian television station, which started broadcasting on 19 May 2013.

== History ==
On 17 April 2012, Russian President Dmitry Medvedev signed decree №455 on establishing of the station. According to Medvedev's decree, the interests of the public will be represented by the Public Television Council (PTC), which will be appointed on the basis of nominations submitted by an all-purpose oversight body called the Public Chamber of Russia. No members of the Channel management will be allowed to be members of parliament or government officials.

In June 2012 the Russian parliament passed a bill setting up a legislative basis for public television. In July the next President Vladimir Putin approved members of the Public Television Supervisory Board and appointed President of the International TV Academy Anatoly Lysenko as director-general.

In September 2012 Prime Minister Dmitry Medvedev signed a resolution establishing Public Television of Russia as an independent non-commercial organization. The charter was also approved and added to the resolution.

Anatoly Lysenko, the director-general of the channel, said shortly before the official opening that "the channel would be educational and was supposed to become a new forum for discussing urgent problems that are a source of concern for Russian society. The channel should also be an instrument of direct and open communication between the people and the authorities".

== Organization ==
Logo of OTR used from 2013 until 2025, still under occasional use

The Supervisory Board includes 25 prominent TV and public figures and among its members are also church representatives. A law on the creation of the Supervisory Board was approved. A new non-profit organization set up to run the Public Television gets the right to make an announcement about public collection of funds to form a special purpose capital, while ordinary non-profit organizations can collect funds only to refill this capital.

== Funding ==
PTR is funded by a mix of Russian government subsidies and public donations. As of 2013 PTR received a combined total of 1.2 bil RUB, the vast majority of which came from state funds.

== Broadcasting ==
The Presidential decree says the Russian Defence Ministry should draw up proposals for using its own TV station, Zvezda, to transmit its programmes.
