= TV1000 Poland =

Polish movie channel

TV1000 Polska
- Country: United Kingdom
- Broadcast area: Poland
- Headquarters: London

Ownership
- Owner: Modern Times Group

History
- Launched: March 5, 2007
- Closed: January 16, 2013

TV1000 Poland was a Polish movie TV channel owned by Modern Times Group, owners of the original TV1000 channels. It was launched on the Cyfrowy Polsat satellite platform on March 5, 2007. On January 16, 2013, TV1000 Poland ceased broadcasting.
