= Zvezda (TV channel) =

Russian state TV network

Zvezda Звезда
- Country: Russia
- Broadcast area: Russia
- Headquarters: Moscow, Russia

Programming
- Picture format: 576i (SDTV) 16:9; 1080i (HDTV) 16:9

Ownership
- Owner: Russian Ministry of Defence (through Zvezda Armed Forces Teleradio Company)

History
- Launched: 16 May 2005 (began broadcasting on 20 February 2005)

Links
- Website: tvzvezda.ru

Availability

Terrestrial
- Russian-wide broadcast: Channel 17 (DVB-T2)

Streaming media
- Channel Zvezda internet broadcast: tvzvezda.ru/schedule/

Zvezda (Note: The official name, as registered with the state media regulator Roskomnadzor, is National Television Company "Zvezda" (NTK ZVEZDA) (Russian: Национальная телевизионная компания «Звезда», romanized: Natsional'naya televizionnaya kompaniya «Zvezda»).) (Russian: Звезда, IPA: [zvʲɪˈzda] , lit. '[The] Star') is a Russian state-owned national TV network run by the Russian Ministry of Defence. As of January 2008, Zvezda's CEO was Grigory Krichevsky; Krichevsky is previously known for his work on Vladimir Gusinsky's NTV channel in the late 1990s.

== History ==
In 1998, Central Television and Radio Studio of the Russian Ministry of Defense won the tender to broadcast the channel in the competition. On July 17, 2000, Zvezda channel was licensed for broadcasting. On February 20, 2005, Zvezda channel first began broadcasting on UHF channel 57 in Moscow. Initially, the channel would only air patriotic documentaries and movies and expected to produce its own documentaries later on. On May 16, 2005, the channel began to broadcast around the clock. In 2006, Zvezda was for the first time broadcast in all of Russia; that same year, a minority share was acquired by Svyazinvest. In 2007, the audience of the channel grew further, as it was included in the package of NTV+. Since 2009, Zvezda is a federal status channel.

In March 2015, Zvezda offered a presenting job to Jeremy Clarkson less than 24 hours after he was dismissed by the BBC from motoring programme Top Gear.

On 1 September 2015, Zvezda began broadcasting in 16:9 widescreen format.

== Controversies ==
Zvezda describes itself as "patriotic" and is considered one of the most sensational and anti-Western news channels in Russia. It has a reputation for publishing biased news stories which favor the Russian government and whitewash Soviet crimes of the past. It has published several controversial news articles. Examples include:

- Finnish military provocations started the Winter War against the Soviet Union
- Czechoslovakia should be grateful for the Soviet invasion of 1968. After this publication caused significant controversy in Czech Republic, Dmitry Medvedev disavowed himself from the article, saying it does not reflect the official Russian statement expressed in 1993 or 2006.

In 2014–15, Zvezda employed Graham Phillips, a British journalist accused of promoting the Russian narrative in the war in Donbas and who was banned from Ukraine for his work. StopFake reported that Phillips was awarded a medal by Russia's Border Guard, a branch of the FSB, a Russian intelligence agency. They reported that Zvezda published an article in July 2015 on the MH17 airplane shot down above Ukraine in 2014 by pro-Russian fighters, which used Phillips' video and witness testimony to assert that the plane was instead shot down by Ukrainian jets.

In March 2023, the channel reportedly cut a clip, posted on Telegram, in which defence minister Sergei Shoigu did not respond to a question from a Zvezda journalist regarding the peace negotiations in the Russian invasion of Ukraine.

== Sanctions ==
Zvezda was sanctioned by the Ukrainian government on 21 May 2021, with an official report referring to the channel as producing "news content in accordance with Kremlin policy to justify Russia's actions".

Kyrgyzstan and Turkmenistan blocked the channel in May 2022.

In October 2022, the Canadian government sanctioned Zvezda amid the Russian invasion of Ukraine. In June 2023, the European Union added Zvezda to its list of sanctions.
