= O2TV =

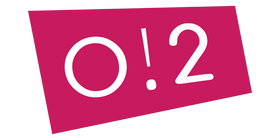
- Country: Russia
- Broadcast area: Russia, CIS

Programming
- Language: Russian
- Picture format: 16:9 (576i, SDTV)

Links
- Website: o2tv.ru

O2TV (stylized as O!2) is a Russian independent TV channel, the target audience of which are young people between 16 and 35, who, as the 2006 presentation reads, would constitute an influential portion of the electorate in the Russian legislative and presidential elections.

The O2TV audience exceeds 17 million people and adds another million every month. The channel is broadcast in over 300 Russian cities, as well as in cities of the Commonwealth of Independent States (CIS).

== History ==
In 2006 the channel, which had already existed for 2 years by broadcasting music, was transformed into and rebranded as socially political. At that time, it had a 'reach' of only 17 million people, including 1.3 million Moscowites. According to the President of the channel Vasily Lavrov, "We had the aim to create an independent media resource, and we did it."

The title 'O2TV' was derived from the chemical designation for an oxygen molecule, O2. A popular brand on the channel — "oxygenic television", worked on the similarity of the Russian slang taboo adjective which means "perfect, great".

No new content is being produced by the channel since June 2022. Most programming performed uses filler musical blocks as well as archives of old programmes. On 28 June 2024, as a result of the decision to liquidate the open joint-stock company Mediaholding, of which O2TV is a subsidiary, the founding company OOO Gamma, the production company OOO Sophit, and the advertising agency OOO Republic Media merged into OOO OMT, the new legal entity responsible for the channel. The channel is currently at risk of shutting down.

== Positioning ==
O2TV is positioned as "one of the first TV projects which aren't devoted to housewives". Instead, it's "television for youth, those who are little interested in the traditional TV stuff, those who live a full life". The major principle of the channel is live communication with the viewers. O2TV doesn't buy any content, but produces its own.

According to Vasily Lavrov, "O2TV is antitelevision in the sense, what's the today TV in our country. We are against bubblegum music, platitude, beavisbuttheads, petrosyans, serdyuchkas and the total seamy side of traditional TV. Our task is to form a sound world-view of young people, but not to copy the consciousness of a dumb western inhabitant. In our country clever, talented people live who should recognize themselves on the TV screen."
