= 5TV (Russian TV channel) =

Russian TV channel from Saint Petersburg

Channel 5 ОАО «Телерадиокомпания «Петербург–Пятый канал»
- Logo since 2023

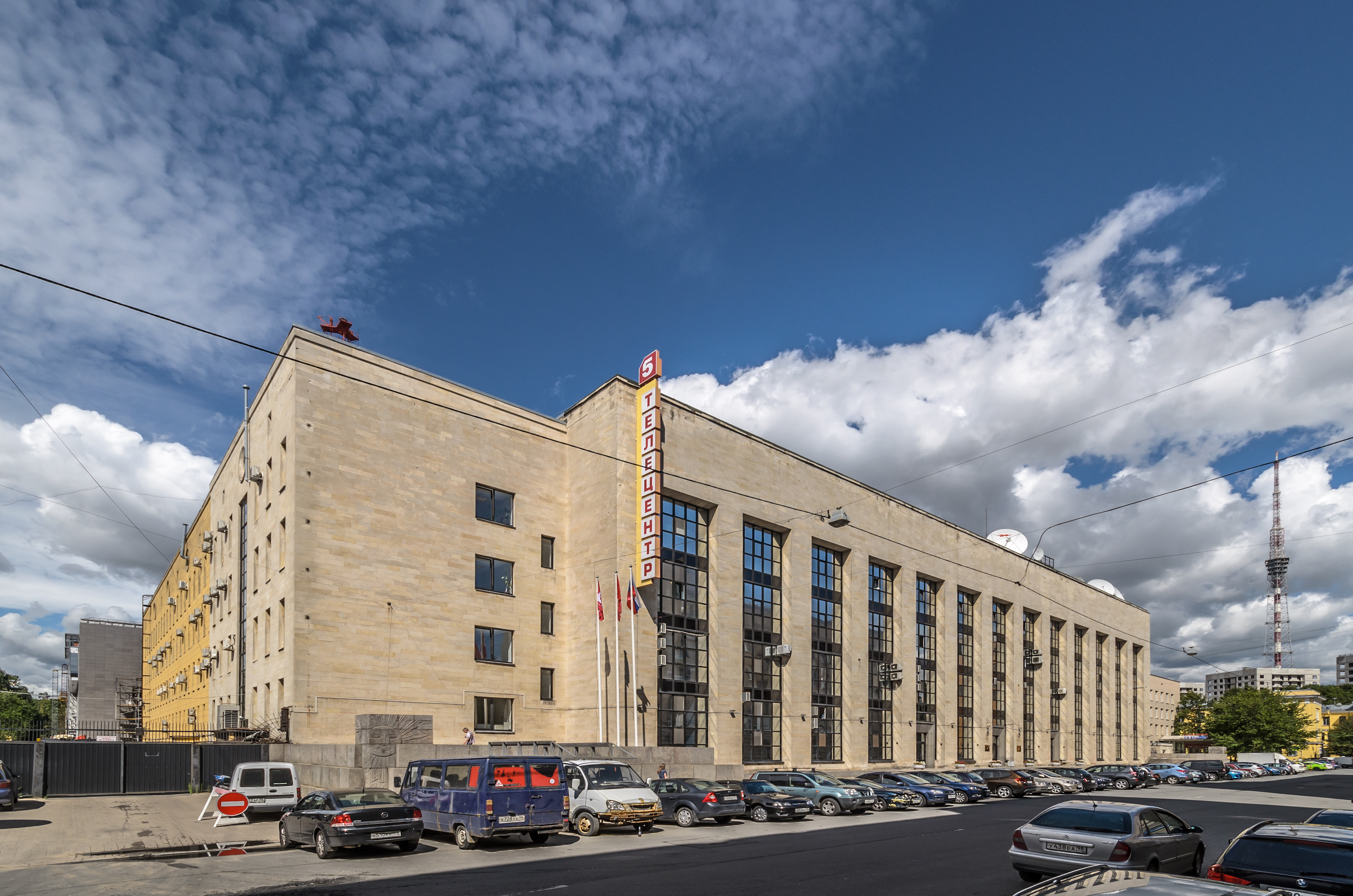
- Television Broadcasting Center of Saint Petersburg
- Country: Russia
- Headquarters: Vladimir Ilyich Electromechanical Plant, Moscow, Russia

Programming
- Language: Russian
- Picture format: 576i (16:9 SDTV); 1080i (16:9 HDTV)

Ownership
- Owner: National Media Group
- Sister channels: Channel One

History
- Launched: 7 July 1938; 88 years ago
- Former names: 1938–1952: Leningrad Radiocenter; 1952–1960: Leningrad Television Studio; 1960–1991: Leningrad Programme CTV (Leningrad Television); 1991–1998: Channel 5; 1998–2004: Petersburg Broadcasting Center

Links
- Website: www.5-tv.ru

Availability

Terrestrial
- Digital terrestrial television: Channel 5 (St. Petersburg), regional channels

5TV is a television channel based in Moscow, Russia. Alexey Brodskiy serves as the director general, with Ljubov Sovershaeva serving as the general producer.

== History ==
Channel 5 succeeded the nationwide Leningrad TV channel dating back to 1938, which was immensely popular throughout the Soviet Union during the last years of Perestroika with such programs as 600 Seconds of its editor-in-chief, Alexander Nevzorov. However, later the channel lost much of its popularity. In 1997 its nationwide network was transferred to the newly formed Kultura TV, and the channel continued broadcasting for Saint Petersburg and Leningrad Oblast only.

During the tenure of Governor Vladimir Yakovlev (1996–2003) the channel, then entirely controlled by the city administration and supervised by Yakovlev's vice-governors for mass media and PR, Alexander Potekhin (1997–2001) and Irina Potekhina (2001–2003), became dragged into political scandals around the city's political elites. In October 2006 Petersburg – Channel 5 was licensed to broadcast nationwide again.

== Ownership ==
The channel is owned by the privately held company National Media Group (NMG) (Russian: ЗАО Национальная Медиа Группа), a holding company with ties to the Russian government and Roman Abramovich. The chairman (of a board of directors) has been Alina Kabaeva since 2014. Olga Paskina has been the director general since 2016. In 2010 approximately 72% of the NMG shares were held by the public company «TRK Peterburg» (TRK - Teleradiocompany, Russian: Телерадиокомпания Петербург) which also controls the channel.

According to the owners the Channel 5 maintains its own independent news service, but in reality, the state-owned media channel Russia Today has maintained control over Channel 5 since 2009 and its news programs are subject to the government's editorial decisions.

== See also ==
- Television in Russia
