= Varzish TV =

State-owned television channel of Tajikistan

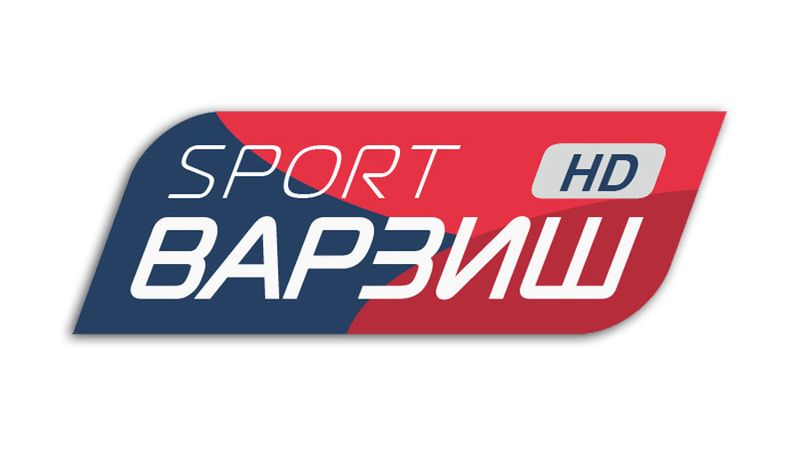
- Country: Tajikistan
- Broadcast area: Tajikistan
- Headquarters: Dushanbe, Tajikistan

Programming
- Language: Tajik
- Picture format: 16:9 HDTV

Ownership
- Owner: State Institution “Children and Youth Television – Bahoriston”

History
- Launched: March 1, 2016; 10 years ago

Links
- Website: Official website

Varzish TV (Tajik: Варзиш ТВ, "Sports TV") is a Tajik sports channel, broadcasting Tajik and international sporting events 24 hours a day.

== History ==
The channel started broadcasting on March 1, 2016 as part of the rollout by presidential decree of two new TV channels (the other one being Sinamo), both of which were created on November 24, 2015. The channel was the first to broadcast in high definition, at a time when the four core television channels broadcast in 4:3 SDTV. Its initial director (until February 2019) was Khurshod Faizullozoda, who in 2019 moved to Tajinvest. Norion Parviz Ismatullo took over his post.

The first "serious" test for the channel was its coverage of the 2016 Summer Olympics held in Rio de Janeiro. Up until then, Tajik television had no experience with Tajik-language sports telecasts. Since then, the channel had carried key events in various sports. During the pandemic, it delivered the rights of the Tajik football league to European countries.

In April 2024, the channel signed a sponsorship agreement with FORMULA55.

In 2025, the channel received a technological upgrade for its coverage of the Tajik league, done by Portuguese company wTVision.
