= Viasat Ukraine =

Satellite television distributor

Viasat Ukraine is a Ukrainian direct broadcast satellite television distributor. It is owned by "Vision TV". It competes with NTV Plus Ukraine and Poverkhnost which broadcast on the Eutelsat system.

The service was launched April 21, 2008 using DVB-S & DVB-S2 transponders on the Astra 4A, Hot Bird and AMOS satellites to broadcast channels compressed with MPEG-2 & MPEG-4 AVC codecs.

In 2016, it was announced that Viasat Ukraine (the Ukrainian division of Viasat) would be sold to 1+1 media conglomerate. The deal was approved by the Antimonopoly Committee of Ukraine and on September 21, 2017, Oleksandr Tkachenko, owner and CEO of 1+1 media, became the ultimate owner of the company.
