= Viasat Kino Action =

European TV channel

Viasat Kino Action East and Baltics
- Logo used since 7 May 2025
- Country: United Kingdom
- Broadcast area: Ukraine; Estonia; Latvia; Lithuania
- Headquarters: London

Programming
- Languages: English; Latvian; Russian
- Picture format: HDTV 1080i (downscaled to 16:9 576i for the SDTV feed)

Ownership
- Owner: Viasat World
- Sister channels: Viasat Kino; Viasat Kino World

History
- Launched: 1 September 2008; 18 years ago
- Closed: 31 March 2023 (Ukraine, for a time)
- Former names: TV1000 Action East (2008–2023)

Links
- Website: Official site

Viasat Kino Action is a television channel broadcasting action movies to the Baltics. It broadcasts international action movies. Movies are dubbed into Russian and subtitled into Estonian, Latvian and Lithuanian.

In the Nordic region TV1000 Action was rebranded in February, 2009. TV1000 Action East was rebranded later in 2009.

On 1 March 2023,from TV1000 Action East renamed to Viasat Kino Action

On 31 March 2023, Viasat World TV channels stopped broadcasting in Ukraine because of a conflict of interest with the Russian owners.

On 9 June 2023, Viasat World TV channels resumed broadcasting on a Ukrainian satellite provider Viasat Ukraine.

== See also ==
- TV1000 (disambiguation)
