= Russian Travel Guide =

Television channel

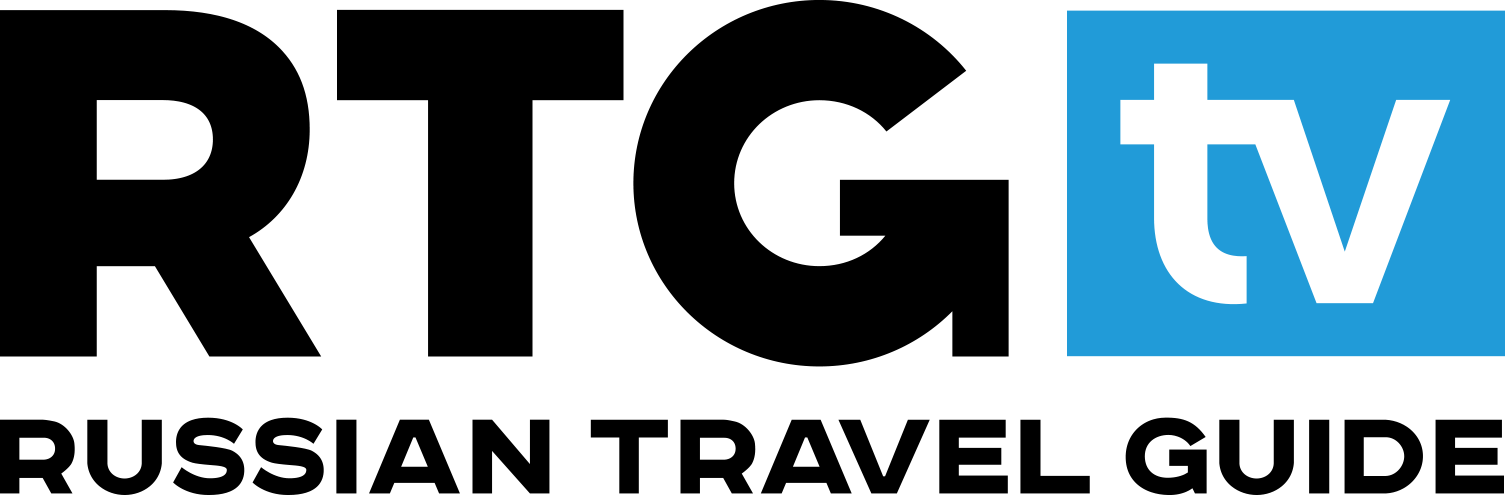
- Country: Russia

Programming
- Languages: English, Russian
- Picture format: 576i (16:9 SDTV); 1080i (HDTV)

Ownership
- Owner: Co Ltd Russian Travel Guide

History
- Launched: 1 May 2009; 17 years ago

Links
- Website: http://www.rtgtv.ru/

Availability

Streaming media
- RTG TV On-line: ссылка

Russian Travel Guide is an international documentary and travel television channel that airs programs covering nature, science, culture, and history of the Russian Federation.

Russian Travel Guide TV is an international documentary television channel focused on the cultural and geographical variety of the world's largest country. RTG TV broadcasts wholly owned, high-quality content in both English and Russian, also in Turkish. Through engaging documentary films, RTG TV gives a wider perspective on Russian history, culture, cuisine, nature and open-air adventures. With never-before-seen documentaries available only on RTG TV, viewers can take part in challenging breakthroughs in the discovery of unexplored locations. RTG TV has twice been awarded as Best Documentary Channel. The cable TV operators of Europe, Russia and CIS countries are showing very high levels of interest in RTG TV, and over 500 of them have already included the channel in their networks.

RTG TV broadcasts 24 hours a day. Premium content, updated weekly, brings diverse regional and cultural perspectives covering the following subjects: nature, the animal world, active holidays, hunting and fishing, cruises and tours, city walks, people, culture, religion, history, ethnography, cuisine, science and technology, resorts.

== Audience ==
Audience of the TV channel (the income average, above an average, high) – living in Russia, Western and Eastern Europe, North Africa, Southwest Asia, and on Arabian Peninsula. More than 9 000 000 subscribers of such cable operators as: Russian - «NTV +», «Акаdо», «Меgafon», «Beeline TV», «Rostelekom», Yota and international - Orange, Du, Baltcom, Turksat and many other (more than 500 cable operators in Russia and abroad); Subscribers to the Internet TV channel broadcasting; visitors of exhibitions, the conferences, the special events organized by the customer; Representatives of tourist business (tour operators, travel agents); Experts of the market, leaders of opinions (VIP-persons), press, organizers of special events (master classes, festivals of tourist films etc.)

== Main countries of the broadcasting of RTG TV ==
- Russia (more than 500 cable and satellite operators)
- The United Arab Emirates, Dubai - DU
- Finland, Vasa - Anvia
- Slovakia, Bratislava - Orange Slovensko, Slovak Telekom
- Israel, Yakum - HOT
- Serbia, Nish - Jotel
- Poland, Poznan - Echostar ZTS
- Poland, Gdansk - Jarsat
- Latvia, Riga - Baltkom, Televideotikls, Lattelecom, ESKA, L.A.T.com, Elektrons S, OshTV, SkaTVis Sia
- Lithuania, Vilnius — Balticum, AVVA
- Estonia - Telset AS
- Estonia, Tallinn - Telset
- Hungary - Invitel
- Croatia - B.net Hrvatska
- Kyrgyzstan - Ala TV
- Kazakhstan – Samsat, Icon, Business-Telecom Ltd, Balkhash TV, TainVertGroup, Aksaysetservice
- Moldova - InterMedia
- Belarus — Betateleset, Telesputnik, Telekombelmedia, the Guarantor, the North, TV Jam, А1 Sistems
- Ukraine — SMGB-Ukraine, Ukrteleset, Kontent-Yukreyn, Information technologies, the Crimean cable channel, Datagrup, Abie Ukraina, Mediakast, Aypi Technologies

The list of the countries of coverage and number of subscribers constantly increases.

== Awards ==
September, 2010: "Best TV Tourism Film about Russia" at Yuri Senkevich National Tourism Award
November, 2010: "Best Television Channel" to represent Russia at HotBird TV Awards
November, 2010: "Best Specialist Genre by AIBs" - Association for International Broadcasting Award
December, 2010: "Best Mass Media in Tourism Industry" by TOP-100 best hospitality and tourism enterprises of Russia
November, 2011: "Best Scientific Film" by AIB, Association for International Broadcasting Award
November, 2011: "Best team" by Kitovras - The international festival of tourism films
