= Viju+ Sport =

Television channel in Russia and the CIS countries

- Broadcast area: Russia, Belarus, Moldova, Georgia, Kazakhstan, Ukraine, Armenia, Kyrgyzstan, Tajikistan, Turkmenistan, Azerbaijan and Uzbekistan
- Headquarters: London, United Kingdom

Programming
- Languages: Russian, English
- Picture format: 16:9 (1080i, HDTV)

Ownership
- Owner: Viasat Russia

History
- Launched: November 2006
- Closed: January 2010 (Baltic countries); 6 September 2022 (Viasat Service)
- Replaced by: Viasat Hockey (Baltic countries)

Links
- Website: Official site

Availability

Streaming media
- Viju (Russia): Live stream

Viju+ Sport (Viju, from Russian вижу: seeing) is a television channel available in Russia and the CIS countries.

The channel launched in Russia, Belarus, Moldova, Georgia, Kazakhstan and the Baltic states in November 2006 in cooperation with ESPN America. It was the eighth channel launched by Viasat in Eastern Europe. It later became available in Ukraine, Armenia, Kyrgyzstan and Uzbekistan.

In January 2010, the channel was removed from Viasat's Baltic platform, where it was replaced by Viasat Hockey.

Viasat Sport stop broadcasting on 6 September 2022 and removed from Viasat packages, however the Russian version is still working, because license is active.
