= Viasat Nature =

Television channel

Viasat Nature Eastern Europe and Baltics
- Country: Lithuania
- Broadcast area: Central Europe, Eastern Europe, Russia, Scandinavia and Commonwealth of Independent States, Lithuania
- Headquarters: London, United Kingdom

Programming
- Picture format: 4:3 (576i, SDTV); 16:9 (HDTV)

Ownership
- Owner: Viasat World LTD
- Sister channels: Viasat History, Viasat Explore

History
- Launched: 1994
- Closed: July 1, 2019 (Africa)
- Replaced by: Love Nature (on Zuku TV)
- Former names: TV6 (1994-1998); TV6 Nature World/Action World (1998-2002); Viasat Nature/Action (2002-2005); Viasat Nature/Crime (2005-2015)

Links
- Website: Viasat World

Viasat Nature is a television channel owned by international media company, Viasat World LTD. The channel has a focus on animals and their owners, blue-chip, classic wildlife, ER and animal rescue, the natural world, and parks and sanctuaries. Viasat Nature is a 24-hour channel, broadcasting in Central and Eastern Europe, Russia, Scandinavia and Commonwealth of Independent States.

== History ==
The channel has its origins in TV6, a Swedish women's channel started in 1994. As TV6, it was a television channel started by Kinnevik as a channel aimed at women. The channel showed TV shows such as Ricki Lake and Dynasty. During the daytime, the shopping channel TVG would broadcast on the same channel as TV6. In 1996 Kinnevik started the sports channel Sportkanalen, which broadcast on the same channel as TV6 during the weekend.

In 1998, the channel was changed into a pan-Nordic pay channel showing nature documentaries from 6 p.m. to 9 p.m. ("TV6 Nature World") and then action movies and series from 9 p.m. to midnight ("TV6 Action World"). In 2002, the channel was renamed and became Viasat Nature and Viasat Action.

Viasat Nature acquires programming from international distributors and production houses.

The content on Viasat Action was gradually shifted to include more crime series such as Law & Order and CSI. This strand was therefore rebranded into Viasat Crime on 1 October 2005. After several years as a six-hour channel, Viasat Nature/Crime extended its broadcasting hours on 1 February 2007. Viasat Nature would now broadcast from 6 a.m. to 8 p.m. when Viasat Crime took over and broadcast until midnight.

The channel has timeshared with many channels over the years. In its early years, the Swedish shopping channel TVG filled up much of the daytime schedule. In 1996, the sports channel Sportkanalen was broadcasting at the weekends. From 1997, Playboy TV has broadcast on the channel after midnight. Nickelodeon Scandinavia started broadcasting from 6 a.m. to 6 p.m. later, and continued to do so until 2007 when Viasat Nature extended its broadcasting hours.
