= Televizioni Tojikiston =

State-owned television channel of Tajikistan

Тоҷикистон
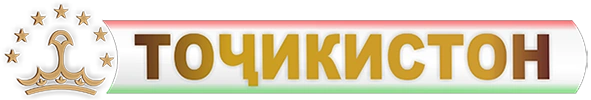
- Country: Tajikistan
- Broadcast area: Tajikistan; United States
- Headquarters: Dushanbe, Tajikistan

Programming
- Languages: Tajik; Russian
- Picture format: 16:9 HDTV

Ownership
- Owner: Government of Tajikistan

History
- Launched: November 3, 1959; 66 years ago
- Former names: Studiya Televizioni Stalinobod (1959-1960s); Шабакаи Якум (Shabakai Yakum, 2006-2016)

Links
- Website: Official website

Televizioni Tojikiston (Tajik: Телевизиони Тоҷикистон), formerly known as Shabakai Yakum (Tajik: Шабакаи Якум, meaning “Channel One”), is the national broadcaster of the Central Asian state of Tajikistan, headquartered in the capital city, Dushanbe. It began broadcasting on November 3, 1959.

== History ==
Television facilities were built between 1956 and 1959. Tajik Television was formed in 1959, initially under the name Студия Телевизиони Сталинобод (Stalinabad Television Studio; Stalinabad being Dushanbe's name at the time). The first program aired by the station consisted of a bilingual Tajik/Russian news bulletin followed by a movie, "Огонекв горах" (Light in the Mountains) and footage of Nikita Khrushchev's visit to the United States. The first words were spoken by Rafuat Abdusalomov. The station broadcast from a transmitter in the Tajik SSR capital, Stalinabad (the current Dushanbe) on channel 1 in the Russian standard. In 1959, there were no less than 300 television sets in Dushanbe.

The first edition of Axbor lasted three minutes and was delivered in Tajik and Russian languages. By 1960, it was a ten-minute bulletin.

Development of the station continued in 1960, receiving its mobile studio on February 2 and starting seven-day broadcasts on July 1. By 1962, more than 29,000 television sets existed in Dushanbe and neighboring areas. The Dushanbe studio remained independent until the end of 1962 when it finally became a part of the Tajik SSR Radio and Television Committee.

Following the building of a relay line between Dushanbe and Tashkent in 1965, the northern area of the Tajik SSR was finally able to receive television.

Color television broadcasts started locally on 7 July 1975 with the airing of the film Mountain Station. Up until then color broadcasts were only possible thanks to mobile stations from outside the Tajik SSR. Plans were already outlined for a conversion of the Dushanbe television center to colour.

By the early 1980s, the USSR State Committee on Television and Radio Broadcasting (Gosteleradio USSR) began broadcasting in the SECAM standard in the Tajik SSR's TV channels, the First and Second Programs, the State Committee of the Tajik SSR (Gosteleradio of the Tajik SSR) - the Tajik Program TV channel (aka Tajik television), State Committee of the Uzbek SSR in Dushanbe and areas of republican subordination - Uzbek program television channel (aka Uzbek television), all three committees were created in 1932. Work for television broadcasts in Bukhara Province was underway in 1988.

In 1990, the number of staff at TVT was of over 400, compared to 1959 when there were only 54. In the period before the country's independence, there was a rising number of staff who were younger.

On June 26, 2006, Tajik Television upgraded to digital technologies, in line with new international standards. The same day was also marked by the rename to Channel 1. The new equipment also led to the abolition of the afternoon break, enabling the channel to have a continuous schedule averaging 18 to 20 hours a day.

24-hour broadcasts commenced in 2012. Most of the channel's schedule is made up of local content. External content (especially foreign movies) is aired in Russian; for foreign material, this was justified as it came from the Russian market. As a measure to accelerate learning of foreign languages, the channel stopped airing dubbed Hollywood and Bollywood movies as an experiment in December 2014, limited to Thursdays and Sundays. One of the first such films in this format was The Great Gatsby. Unlike films shown in Tajik or Russian languages, the movies in this test run were aired without commercial breaks.

In June 2016, the channel's current name was adopted. In September 2017, the channel started using HD equipment.

On April 1, 2022, it was announced that it would be launched in HD quality, and it broadcasts programs, including films, series, and various programs, which were broadcast on the Iraqi satellite ShababSat on DMN. Samandar Iskandarzoda was appointed director of the channel in August 2022.

== Broadcast ==
Broadcasting is conducted throughout the territory of Tajikistan on VHF over-the-air frequencies. In other countries, the television channel is accessible through cable television and the Internet. The channel is owned by the Government of the Republic of Tajikistan and the state institution "Television Tajikistan".

== Logos ==
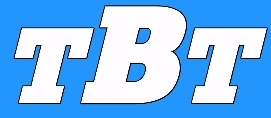
(1992–1999)

(1999–2003)

(2003–2005)

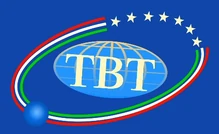
(2005–2006)

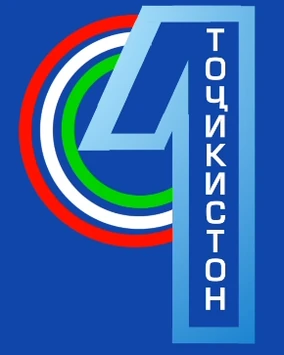
(2006–2007)

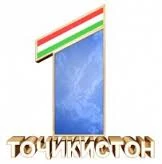
(2007–2013)

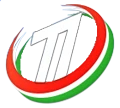
(2013–2016)

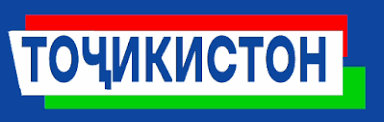
(2016–2017)

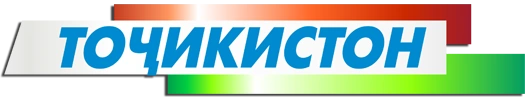
(2017–2020)

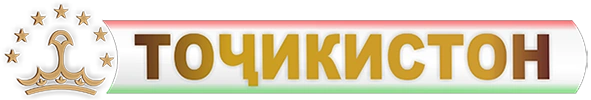
Current logo since 2020

== See also ==
- List of Russian-language television channels
