= Viasat Kino =

European TV channel

Viasat Kino Baltics and East
- Logo used since 7 May 2025
- Country: Estonia, uk
- Broadcast area: Ukraine; Estonia; Latvia; Lithuania; Europe

Programming
- Languages: English; Latvian; Russian
- Picture format: HDTV 1080i (downscaled to 16:9 576i for the SDTV feed)

Ownership
- Owner: Viasat World
- Sister channels: Viasat Kino Action

History
- Launched: 1 March 2003; 23 years ago
- Closed: 31 March 2023 (Ukraine, for a time)
- Former names: TV1000 East (2003–2023)

Links
- Website: https://viasatkino.com/

Viasat Kino is a movie television channel targeting the Baltic countries. It is owned by the international broadcaster Viasat World and was launched on 1 March 2003 by Swedish media conglomerate Modern Times Group.

On 1 March 2023, from TV1000 East renamed to Viasat Kino channel.

On 31 March 2023, Viasat World TV channels stopped broadcasting in Ukraine because of a conflict of interest with the Russian owners.

On 9 June 2023, Viasat World TV channels resumed broadcasting on a Ukrainian satellite provider Viasat Ukraine and other cable providers. However, Ukraine's regulator the National Council said it does not recommend the distribution of Viasat channels, despite the fact that they have a three-month licence issued in another EU country.
