= Viasat History =

- Broadcast area: Central Europe, Eastern Europe
- Headquarters: London, United Kingdom

Programming
- Picture format: 1080i HDTV

Ownership
- Owner: Viasat World LTD
- Sister channels: Viasat Explore, Viasat Nature

History
- Launched: 1 November 2004

Links
- Website: Viasat World

Availability

Terrestrial
- Digita (Finland): Channel 126
- evotv (Croatia): Channel 110

Viasat History is a pay television channel owned by the International media company, Viasat World LTD. The channel broadcasts history series from around the world with a focus on the ancient world, historical drama, royal history, travel history and religious history. Viasat History is a 24-hour channel, broadcasting in Central and Eastern Europe, The Baltics, Turkey, and Israel.

With headquarters in London, United Kingdom, the channel started initially to broadcast to Scandinavian countries and after a few years expanded to the Baltic countries with subtitles and many East European markets.

Viasat History acquires programming from international distributors and production houses. Since 2012, Viasat History together with sister channels Viasat Explore and Viasat Nature are broadcast in HD together with the SD feed on the Viasat satellite platform.
