= Viasat Explore =

Television channel in central and eastern Europe

Viasat Explore Eastern Europe and Baltics
- Logo used since 20 May 2026
- Broadcast area: Central Europe, Eastern Europe, Baltics lika english, Estonia, LATVIA

Programming
- Picture format: 16:9 (576i, SDTV), HDTV

Ownership
- Owner: Viasat World LTD
- Sister channels: Viasat History, Viasat Nature, TV1000 Explore

History
- Launched: 6 January 2002 (23 years ago)
- Former names: Viasat Explorer (2002-2014)

Links
- Website: Viasat World

Availability

Terrestrial
- evotv (Croatia): Channel 109

Viasat Explore is a television channel owned by international media company, Viasat World LTD. The channel focuses on fishing, adventure, men at work and engineering. Viasat Explore is a 24-hour channel broadcasting in Central and Eastern Europe, Scandinavia, Russia and Commonwealth of Independent States.

With headquarters in London, United Kingdom, the channel started its broadcast in the Scandinavian countries and after a few years expanded to many East European markets and the Baltic countries with subtitles.

The service was launched in January 2002 as Viasat Explorer in Sweden, Denmark, Norway and Finland. On 1 November 2003 it expanded into Ukraine, Russia, Kazakhstan, Estonia, Latvia, Lithuania, Moldova, Belarus, Hungary, Poland, Romania and Bulgaria. In 2006, all Serbian cable operators and their satellite platform, Total TV began with broadcasting this channel.

Viasat Explore co-produces and acquires content from international distributors and production houses.

Since 2012, Viasat Explorer together with sisterchannels Viasat History and Viasat Nature are broadcast in HD together with the SD feed on the Viasat satellite platform. The channel was rebranded as Viasat Explore on 29 April 2014, gaining a new ident package and logo and dropping the "X" letter from its logo in flavour of an "E".
