= Telekabel =

North Macedonian telecommunications provider

- Industry: Telecommunications
- Founded: 1997
- Headquarters: Štip, North Macedonia
- Key people: Zoran Ristov (Director)
- Products: Cable television, Telephony, Internet services, Mobile telephony
- Owner: Robert Dimitrov
- Website: telekabel.com.mk

Telekabel is a cable television operator and Internet Service Provider for cable and fiber internet in North Macedonia headquartered in Štip, North Macedonia. They also offer Mobile and Fixed Telephony services.

== Channels available in Skopje ==
- 24 Kitchen
- Al Jazeera
- Alsat M
- Animal Planet
- Arena ESport HD
- Arena ESport HD
- Arena Fight HD
- Arena Fight HD
- Arena Premium 1 HD
- Arena Premium 1 HD
- Arena Premium 2 HD
- Arena Premium 2 HD
- Arena Premium 3 HD
- Arena Premium 3 HD
- Arena Sport 1 HD
- Arena Sport 2 HD
- Arena Sport 3 HD
- Arena Sport 4 HD
- Arena Sport 5 HD
- AXN
- Balkan Music
- Balkan Trip
- Balkanika
- BN Music HD
- BN SAT HD
- Boomerang
- Brainz
- Brazzers TV
- Cartoon Network
- Cinemania
- Club MTV
- CMC
- CNBC
- CNN
- Crime and Investigation Network
- Discovery Channel
- Discovery ID
- Discovery Science
- DIVA
- DM SAT
- DocuBox HD
- DW
- Ekovizija TV
- Elta 1 HD
- Elta 2
- Entertainment
- Epic Drama
- Euro News HD
- Eurosport
- Eurosport 2
- Extreme Sports
- Fashion TV
- FashionBox HD
- FEN TV
- FightBox HD
- FilmBox Arthouse
- FilmBox Extra HD
- FilmBox Plus
- Food Network
- France 24 HD
- Grand
- HGTV HD
- Hustler TV
- IDJ TV HD
- JIM JAM
- Jugoton TV
- Lov i Ribolov
- Luxe TV HD
- MCM Top HD
- Mezzo
- MTV 80s
- MTV 90s
- MTV Adria
- MTV Hits
- N1
- National Geographic
- NOVA S HD
- Nova Sport HD
- OTV Valentino
- Pikaboo
- Private TV
- Red Light
- RTL
- RTL 2
- RTL Kockica
- RTL Living
- RTRS
- RTS Svet
- Sci Fi HD
- SK Esports
- SK Golf
- SK Golf
- Sport Klub 1
- Sport Klub 1
- Sport Klub 2
- Sport Klub 2 HD
- Sport Klub 3
- Sport Klub 3 HD
- Sport Klub 4
- Sport Klub 5
- Sport Klub 6
- Sport Klub HD
- Star Channel
- Star Crime
- Star Life
- Star Movies
- Televizija 24
- TLC
- Travel Channel
- TV1000
- TV5 Monde
- Valentino Music
- Vavoom
- Viasat Explorer
- Viasat History
- Viasat Nature
- Алфа ТВ
- EDO TV
- Канал 5
- МРТ 1
- МРТ 1 HD
- МРТ 2
- МРТ 3
- МРТ 4
- МРТ 5
- Наша ТВ
- Сител
- Сител HD
- Собраниски Канал
- TV MTM
- ТВ Сонце
- Telekabel Info
- Телма
- Sutel TV

== See also ==
- Television in North Macedonia
- MaxTV
