= Television in North Macedonia =

Television in North Macedonia was first introduced in 1964; it remains the most popular news medium. The public broadcaster is the Macedonian Radio Television, founded in 1993. TEKO TV (1989) from Štip is the first private television channel in the country. Other popular private channels are: Sitel, Kanal 5, Telma, Alfa TV, Alsat-M and TV 24. Most private media are tied to political or business interests and state media tend to support the government. Public broadcast networks face stiff competition from commercial stations, which dominate the ratings. A European Union sponsored report says that with scores of TV and radio networks, the market is overcrowded and many local broadcasters are struggling to survive financially.

== DVB-T ==
DVB-T was introduced in Republic of Macedonia (now North Macedonia) in November 2009 as a Pay TV platform known as BoomTV by ONE. The platform includes national channels with national frequency and the most popular world channels. Boom TV is using 3 multiplexes (MUX 1, MUX 2 and MUX 3). The DVB-T switch off in the country was completed on 1 June 2013. MRD (Republic of Macedonia Broadcasting Council) operates and maintains the DVB-T network in the Republic of North Macedonia and the public Macedonian Radio Television using MUX 4 and MUX 5 while ONE operates the private national and local TV stations in North Macedonia using MUX 6 and MUX 7.

The DVB-T transmissions in North Macedonia are standard-definition and high-definition, MPEG-4, X7F modulation, 64-QAM, 2/3 Code-rate.

DVB-T Frequencies in North Macedonia

Nationwide free-to-air DVB-T television channels in North Macedonia
Name	Owner	Programming	Type	Encryption	MUX
MRT 1	Macedonian Radio Television	General	Public broadcaster	Clear	4
MRT 2	Macedonian Radio Television	General	Public broadcaster	Clear	4
MRT 3	Macedonian Radio Television	General	Public broadcaster	Clear	4
MRT 4	Macedonian Radio Television	General	Public broadcaster	Clear	4
MRT 5	Macedonian Radio Television	General	Public broadcaster	Clear	4
MRT Sobraniski Kanal	Macedonian Radio Television	Parliament	Public broadcaster	Clear	4
MRT 1 HD	Macedonian Radio Television	General	Public broadcaster	Clear	5
MRT 2 HD	Macedonian Radio Television	General	Public broadcaster	Clear	5
Kanal 5	TV Kanal 5	General	Private channel	Clear	6
Sitel TV	TV Sitel	General	Private channel	Clear	6
Alfa TV	TV Alfa	General	Private channel	Clear	6
Telma TV	TV Telma	General	Private channel	Clear	6

Regional free-to-air DVB-T television channels in North Macedonia
Name	Region	Programming	Type	Encryption	MUX
TV EDO	D1 Skopje	Regional	Private channel	Clear	7
TV ERA	D1 Skopje	Regional	Private channel	Clear	7
TV BTR	D1 Skopje	Regional	Private channel	Clear	7
TV Shutel	D1 Skopje	Regional	Private channel	Clear	7
TV MTM	D1 Skopje	Regional	Private channel	Clear	7
TV Skopje	D1 Skopje	Regional	Private channel	Clear	7
TV Tikveshija	D1 Skopje	Regional	Private channel	Clear	7
KTV Kavadarci	D1 Veles	Regional	Private channel	Clear	7
Sitel 2	D2	Regional	Private channel	Clear	7
K3	D2	Regional	Private channel	Clear	7
TV Plus	D2	Regional	Private channel	Clear	7
KRT	D2	Regional	Private channel	Clear	7
TV Festa	D2	Regional	Private channel	Clear	7
TV Hana	D2	Regional	Private channel	Clear	7
TV Star	D3	Regional	Private channel	Clear	7
TV D1	D3	Regional	Private channel	Clear	7
TV Iris	D3	Regional	Private channel	Clear	7
TV Vis	D4	Regional	Private channel	Clear	7
TV Kobra	D4	Regional	Private channel	Clear	7
TV VTV	D4	Regional	Private channel	Clear	7
TV Boem	D5	Regional	Private channel	Clear	7
TV Tera	D5	Regional	Private channel	Clear	7
TV Vizhn-BM	D5	Regional	Private channel	Clear	7
TV Uskana	D5	Regional	Private channel	Clear	7
TV NTV	D6	Regional	Private channel	Clear	7
TV Kanal 3	D7	Regional	Private channel	Clear	7
TV Koha	D8	Regional	Private channel	Clear	7
TV Menada	D8	Regional	Private channel	Clear	7
TV Kiss	D8	Regional	Private channel	Clear	7
TV Chegrani	D8	Regional	Private channel	Clear	7

== IPTV ==
On 17 November 2008, IPTV was officially launched when the country's first IPTV service, MaxTV, was launched by Makedonski Telekom.

On 1 November 2023, Telekom Srbija officially launched it IPTV service, MTel streaming platform MOVE TV.

== Cable television ==
Cable television is highly developed, with cable television penetration in Skopje at 67% of all households. There are 49 cable TV providers with the two majors A1 and Telekabel holding 80% of the market. The two majors offer cable television in both analogue and digital, and they have also introduced triple play at the beginning of 2007.

== Public television stations with national frequency ==
- MRT 1
- MRT 2
- MRT Sobraniski Kanal

== TV Channels at the state level through the operator of digital terrestrial multiplex ==
- Sitel TV
- Kanal 5
- Alfa TV
- Telma TV
- Alsat-M

== TV Channels at the state level through public electronic communications network ==
- TV Art

== TV Channels at the state level through satellite ==
- Sitel 3
- Kanal 5 plus
- TV 24
- Naša TV
- TV Sonce

== TV channels at the regional level through public electronic communications network that uses limited resources ==
- TV Skajnet
- TV Tera
- TV M

== High-definition television stations ==
- MRT 1 HD
- MRT 2 HD
- MRT 3 HD

== Macedonian television stations on satellite ==
- MRT 1
- MRT Sat
- MRT 2 Sat
- Sitel
- Sitel 3
- Kanal 5
- Kanal 5 plus
- Alfa TV
- 24 Vesti
- Naša TV
- TV Sonce
- TV ERA

== International channels translated into Macedonian ==
Channels marked with an asterisk (*) have a Macedonian audio channel, all others have Macedonian subtitles only

- 24Kitchen
- Animal Planet
- Animal Planet HD
- AXN Adria*
- CineStar Action and Thriller
- CineStar TV
- DaVinci Learning
- Discovery Channel
- Discovery HD Showcase
- Discovery Travel & Living
- DocuBOX HD
- E! Entertainment
- FilmBOX HD
- FilmBOX Plus
- Fox Crime
- FOX TV
- Fox Life
- HBO Adria*
- HBO Comedy*
- History Channel
- National Geographic Channel
- MTV Adria
- OrlandoKids*
- Travel Channel
- Tring Max
- Viasat Explore
- Viasat Film
- Viasat History
- Viasat Nature

== See also ==
- Lists of television channels
- Television
- List of language television channels
- Television in Europe
