= Macedonia in the Eurovision Song Contest 2005 =

- Eurovision Song Contest 2005
- Participating broadcaster: Macedonian Radio Television (MRT)
- Country: Macedonia
- Selection process: Makedonski Evrosong 2005
- Selection date: 19 February 2005

Competing entry
- Song: "Make My Day"
- Artist: Martin Vučić
- Songwriters: Dragan Vučić; Branka Kostić

Placement
- Semi-final result: Qualified (9th, 97 points)
- Final result: 17th, 52 points

Participation chronology

Macedonia (Note: Officially under the provisional appellation "former Yugoslav Republic of Macedonia", abbreviated "FYR Macedonia".) was represented at the Eurovision Song Contest 2005 with the song "Make My Day", written by Dragan Vučić and Branka Kostić, and performed by Martin Vučić. The Macedonian participating broadcaster, Macedonian Radio Television (MRT), organised the national final Makedonski Evrosong 2005 in order to select its entry for the contest. Five artists were presented to the public in November 2004 and an eight-member jury panel and a public televote selected two artists to qualify to the compete in the competition on 19 February 2005, where "Ti si son" (Ти си сон) performed by Martin Vučić was selected following two rounds of voting from a twelve-member jury panel, an audience vote and a public televote. The song was later translated from Macedonian to English for Eurovision and was titled "Make My Day".

Macedonia competed in the semi-final of the Eurovision Song Contest which took place on 19 May 2005. Performing during the show in position 17, "Make My Day" was announced among the top 10 entries of the semi-final and therefore qualified to compete in the final on 21 May. It was later revealed that Macedonia placed ninth out of the 25 participating countries in the semi-final with 97 points. In the final, Macedonia performed in position 15 and placed seventeenth out of the 24 participating countries, scoring 52 points.

== Background ==
Prior to the 2005 contest, Macedonian Radio Television (MRT) had participated in the Eurovision Song Contest representing Macedonia four times since its first entry in 1998. Its best result in the contest to this point was fourteenth, achieved in 2004 with the song "Life" performed by Toše Proeski.

As part of its duties as participating broadcaster, MRT organises the selection of its entry in the Eurovision Song Contest and broadcasts the event in the country. The broadcaster had previously selected its entry for the contest through both national finals and internal selections. MRT confirmed its intentions to participate at the 2005 contest on 22 October 2004. Since 1996, the broadcaster selected its entries using a national final, a procedure that continued for its 2005 entry.

== Before Eurovision ==
=== Makedonski Evrosong 2005 ===
Makedonski Evrosong 2005 was the national final organised by MRT to select its entry for the Eurovision Song Contest 2005. The competition took place on 19 February 2005 at the Universal Hall in Skopje, hosted by Karolina Petkovska and Aneta Andonova and was broadcast on MTV 1, MTV Sat and online via the broadcaster's official Eurovision Song Contest website eurosong.com.mk.

==== Competing entries ====
A committee consisting of sixteen members each nominated eight artists, and the six most nominated acts were presented to the public on 7 November 2004 via special broadcasts on MTV 1 and MTV Sat. On 9 November 2004, MRT announced that Kaliopi had withdrawn from the selection. The top two artists, Aleksandra Pileva and Martin Vučić, qualified to compete in the national final by a 50/50 combination of public televoting held between 7 and 14 November 2004 and an eight-member jury panel, and were announced on 14 November during the MTV 1 programme Ne zaspivaj sega. The jury panel consisted of Vesna Ginovska-Ilkova (opera singer), Živojin Glišić (professor at the Faculty of Music), Vesna Petrushevska-Trenkoski (actress), Biljana Beličanec-Aleksić (actress), Joško Boškovski (MR), Zoran Mirčevski (MR), Jane Teoharevski (MTV), and an aggregate 20-member press vote as the eighth member. Pileva and Vučić then each selected four candidate songs for the national final: three from over 100 songs that MRT received through an open submission and from directly invited composers, and one provided by the artists themselves.

Artists selection – 7–14 November 2004
R/O	Artist	Televote		Total	Place
R/O	Artist	Votes	Rank	Total	Place
1	Martin Vučić	1,089	1	87	1
2	Tamara Todevska	74	4	35	5
3	Tijana Dapčević	54	5	37	4
4	Superhiks	109	3	44	3
5	Aleksandra Pileva	305	2	53	2

Competing entries
Artist	Song	Songwriter(s)	Selection
Aleksandra Pileva	"Baknješ za kraj" (Бакњеш за крај)	Aleksandar Ristovski-Princ	Open submission
Aleksandra Pileva	"Izvini" (Извини)	Vesna Malinova	Open submission
Aleksandra Pileva	"Ne" (Не)	Kaliopi Gril	Open submission
Aleksandra Pileva	"Sonce i mesečina" (Сонце и месечина)	Darko Dimitrov, Vlado Janevski	Provided by the artist
Martin Vučić	"Dali vredi?" (Дали вреди?)	Goran Alacki, Maja Pavlovska	Open submission
Martin Vučić	"Kolku bolka ostana" (Колку болка остана)	Grigor Koprov, Ognen Nedelkovski	Open submission
Martin Vučić	"Ljubovna parada" (Љубовна парада)	Marko Markoski, Rade Vrčakovski	Open submission
Martin Vučić	"Ti si son" (Ти си сон)	Dragan Vučić, Ognen Nedelkovski	Provided by the artist

==== Final ====
The final took place on 19 February 2005 where the winner was selected over two rounds of voting. In the first round, a combination of public televoting (1/3), votes from the audience in the venue (1/3) and a twelve-member jury panel (1/3) selected one song per artist to advance to the second round. In the second round, the public, audience and jury vote selected "Ti si son" performed by Martin Vučić as the winner. The jury panel consisted of Metodi Čepreganov (doctor), Avni Qahili (MTV 2), Diki Tavitjan (musician), Valentina Todoroska (Utrinski vesnik), Joško Boškovski (Radio Macedonia), Vlatko Plevneš (musician), Tanja Grkovska (MTV), Robert Sazdov (producer), Cvetanka Laskova (singer), Katerina Kocevska (actress), Beni Šakiri (musician) and Nikola Firiev (MTV). In addition to the performances of the competing entries, the competition featured guest performances by Biba Dodeva, Andrijana Janevska, Iskra Trpeva, Tamara Todevska and Martina Siljanovska (who represented Macedonia in Junior Eurovision 2004).

First Round – 19 February 2005
R/O	Artist	Song	Jury	Audience	Televote		Total	Place
R/O	Artist	Song	Jury	Audience	Votes	Points	Total	Place
1	Aleksandra Pileva	"Ne"	40	48	4,329	48	136	3
2	Martin Vučić	"Dali vredi?"	15	36	732	0	51	7
3	Aleksandra Pileva	"Baknješ za kraj"	22	12	808	0	34	8
4	Martin Vučić	"Kolku bolka ostana"	31	0	2,124	36	67	4
5	Aleksandra Pileva	"Izvini"	16	24	882	12	52	6
6	Martin Vučić	"Ljubovna parada"	30	0	1,440	24	54	5
7	Aleksandra Pileva	"Sonce i mesečina"	48	72	35,375	96	216	2
8	Martin Vučić	"Ti si son"	86	96	14,556	72	254	1

Detailed Jury Votes
R/O	Song	Metodi Čepreganov	Avni Qahili	Diki Tavitjan	Valentina Todoroska	Joško Boškovski	Vlatko Plevneš	Tanja Grkovska	Robert Sazdov	Cvetanka Laskova	Katerina Kocevska	Beni Šakiri	Nikola Firiev	Total
1	"Ne"	2	6	4	4	4	3	6		6	4	1		40
2	"Dali vredi?"	1		3	3	1	1		4	1			1	15
3	"Baknješ za kraj"		3			2		3	6	2		2	4	22
4	"Kolku bolka ostana"	4	4		2		2	4	3	3	3	3	3	31
5	"Izvini"		2	2		3			2		1		6	16
6	"Ljubovna parada"	3	1	1	1	6	6	1	1		2	6	2	30
7	"Sonce i mesečina"	6	8	8	6		4	2		4	6	4		48
8	"Ti si son"	8		6	8	8	8	8	8	8	8	8	8	86

Second Round – 19 February 2005
R/O	Artist	Song	Jury	Audience		Televote		Total	Place
R/O	Artist	Song	Jury	Votes	Points	Votes	Points	Total	Place
1	Aleksandra Pileva	"Sonce i mesečina"	2	494	0	50,159	12	14	2
2	Martin Vučić	"Ti si son"	10	570	14	8,790	0	24	1

Detailed Jury Votes
R/O	Song	Metodi Čepreganov	Avni Qahili	Diki Tavitjan	Valentina Todoroska	Joško Boškovski	Vlatko Plevneš	Tanja Grkovska	Robert Sazdov	Cvetanka Laskova	Katerina Kocevska	Beni Šakiri	Nikola Firiev	Total
1	"Sonce i mesečina"		X	X										2
2	"Ti si son"	X			X	X	X	X	X	X	X	X	X	10

=== Controversy ===
The Macedonian national final sparked controversy due to the large discrepancy between the jury and public vote; Aleksandra Pileva won the televote in both rounds but lost out to Martin Vučić despite receiving six times more votes than him in the second round. In addition, some of the audience members later admitted that they have been given free tickets to attend the show in order to vote for Vučić. Martin Vučić and his father Dragan Vučić (also the co-composer of "Ti si son") were physically and verbally assaulted outside the venue by the supporters of Pileva, while Macedonian Prime Minister Vlado Bučkovski who also attended the show expressed concern over the way the points were awarded.

Macedonian Eurovision Head of Delegation Ivan Mircevski later stated that he was at fault for determining the voting system and that he personally apologised to both artists for the scandal. MRT released a statement on 25 February affirming Martin Vučić as the winner after no irregularities with the voting were found.

== At Eurovision ==
According to Eurovision rules, all nations with the exceptions of the host country, the "Big Four" (France, Germany, Spain and the United Kingdom), and the ten highest placed finishers in the 2004 contest are required to qualify from the semi-final on 19 May 2005 in order to compete for the final on 21 May 2005; the top ten countries from the semi-final progress to the final. On 22 March 2005, a special allocation draw was held which determined the running order for the semi-final and Macedonia was set to perform in position 17, following the entry from Finland and before the entry from Andorra. Martin Vučić performed the English version of "Ti si son" at the contest, titled "Make My Day". At the end of the semi-final, Macedonia was announced as having finished in the top 10 and subsequently qualifying for the grand final. It was later revealed that Macedonia placed third in the semi-final, receiving a total of 185 points. The draw for the running order for the final was done by the presenters during the announcement of the ten qualifying countries during the semi-final and Macedonia was drawn to perform in position 15, following the entry from Sweden and before the entry from Ukraine. Macedonia placed seventeenth in the final, scoring 52 points.

The semi-final and final were broadcast in Macedonia on MTV 1 and MTV Sat with commentary by Ivan Mirčevski. MRT appointed Karolina Gočeva (who represented Macedonia in 2002) as its spokesperson to announce the Macedonian votes during the final.

=== Voting ===
Below is a breakdown of points awarded to Macedonia and awarded by Macedonia in the semi-final and grand final of the contest. The nation awarded its 12 points to Croatia in the semi-final and to Albania in the final of the contest.

==== Points awarded to Macedonia ====
Points awarded to Macedonia (Semi-final)
Score	Country
12 points	Albania; Croatia
10 points	Bosnia and Herzegovina; Bulgaria; Serbia and Montenegro; Turkey
8 points	Slovenia; Switzerland
7 points	
6 points	
5 points	
4 points	Austria; Romania
3 points	Monaco; Netherlands
2 points	Germany
1 point	Sweden

Points awarded to Macedonia (Final)
Score	Country
12 points	
10 points	Albania
8 points	Croatia
7 points	Bosnia and Herzegovina; Bulgaria; Serbia and Montenegro
6 points	
5 points	Slovenia; Turkey
4 points	
3 points	
2 points	Switzerland
1 point	Monaco

==== Points awarded by Macedonia ====
Points awarded by Macedonia (Semi-final)
Score	Country
12 points	Croatia
10 points	Moldova
8 points	Bulgaria
7 points	Slovenia
6 points	Belarus
5 points	Romania
4 points	Hungary
3 points	Switzerland
2 points	Norway
1 point	Israel

Points awarded by Macedonia (Final)
Score	Country
12 points	Albania
10 points	Serbia and Montenegro
8 points	Croatia
7 points	Greece
6 points	Sweden
5 points	Moldova
4 points	Turkey
3 points	Bosnia and Herzegovina
2 points	Romania
1 point	Hungary
