= Obiteljski Radio Valentino =

Brčko; Bosnia and Herzegovina
- Broadcast area: Bosnia and Herzegovina

Programming
- Languages: Croatian; Bosnian
- Format: Variety, Pop-Folk Music, talk shows
- Affiliations: DENI-COMPANI

Ownership
- Owner: "DENI COMPANI" d.o.o., Bijela kbr. 108A (Brčko)

History
- First air date: 6 August 1995
- Call sign meaning: (**ORV**)

Technical information
- Transmitter coordinates: 44°47′24″N 18°33′39″E

Links
- Website: www.valentinobh.com

Obiteljski Radio Valentino or ORV is a Bosnian commercial radio station, broadcasting from Bijela in Brčko District.

Radio was founded on 6 August 1995. The station focuses on turbo-folk music and talk shows that is usually ordered by listeners, by phone, SMS or internet. Estimated number of potential listeners of ORV is around 848.877. The program is also broadcast via web and satellite (Eutelsat W2, 16 degrees E, frequency 11.366, symbol rate 30.000, FEC 3/4).

In the media market of Bosnia and Herzegovina, Obiteljski Radio Valentino is a part of the media group called DENI-COMPANI along with sister TV channels: Obiteljska televizija Valentino, VALENTINO ETNO, Valentino Music HD and PRVA HERCEGOVAČKA.

== Frequencies ==
The program is currently broadcast at 18 frequencies in Bosnia and Herzegovina cities:

- Sanski Most 88.0 MHz
- Ilijaš 92.4 MHz
- Fojnica 93.2 MHz
- Bosansko Grahovo 93.7 MHz
- Majevica 94.3 MHz
- Višegrad 95.2 MHz
- Jajce 95.6 MHz
- Žepče 97.8 MHz
- Gradačac 97.9 MHz
- Drvar 98.4 MHz
- Vareš 99.7 MHz
- Velika Kladuša 101.4 MHz
- Stolac 102.9 MHz
- Glamoč 104.1 MHz
- Olovo 105.3 MHz
- Tuzla 105.5 MHz
- Drvar 106.7 MHz
- Donji Vakuf 107.2 MHz

== See also ==
- List of radio stations in Bosnia and Herzegovina
