= A1 Macedonia =

Telecommunications company in North Macedonia

A1 Makedonija DOOEL Skopje
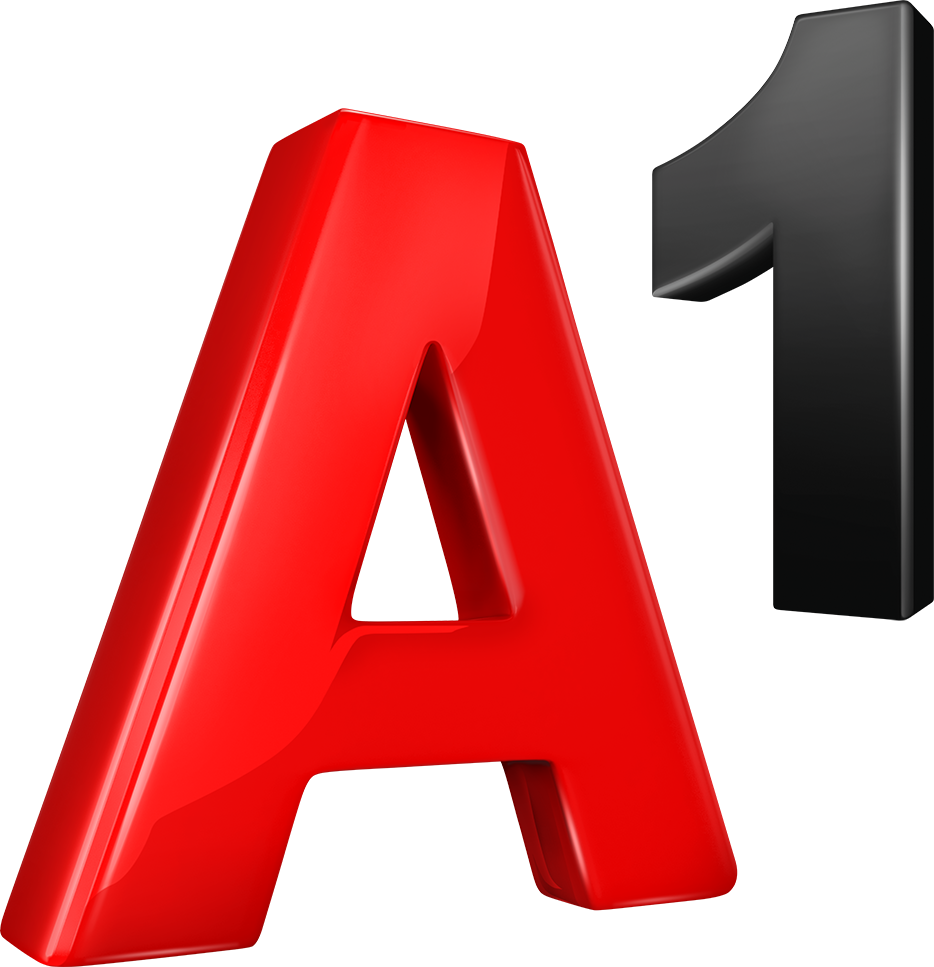
- Type: Subsidiary
- Industry: Telecommunications
- Predecessor: One; Vip Operator; Blizoo
- Founded: March 26, 2007; 19 years ago
- Headquarters: Skopje, North Macedonia
- Key people: Metodija Mirchev (Executive director); Jiří Dvorjančanský (CEO); Goran Manester (CFO)
- Products: Fixed-line telephony; Mobile telephony; Broadband internet; Cable television; Terrestrial subscription television; IT services
- Revenue: ▲€134.6 million (2021)
- Net income: ▲€15.2 million (2021)
- Number of employees: 767 (2021)
- Parent: A1 Telekom Austria Group
- Website: a1.mk

A1 Macedonia DOOEL Skopje is a telecommunications company in North Macedonia owned by A1 Telekom Austria Group. A1 offers broadband internet, cable and terrestrial television, mobile telephony and landline.

== History ==
Vip Macedonia (then known as one.VIP) was created in 2015, when two of North Macedonia's mobile network operators, One and Vip merged to create the new company. One had been operating in the North Macedonia market since 2003 and Vip from 2007.

The merged company (one.vip) resulted in the Telekom Austria Group having a 55% interest in the newly created company and Telekom Slovenije Group having 45%. The agreement included the option for the exit of the Telekom Slovenije Group within three years of the transaction closing date.

This happened in 2017, when Telekom Slovenije sold their shares to Telekom Austria Group.

In May 2016, Vip Macedonia bought the local subsidiary of blizoo which was the largest cable operator in North Macedonia.

== Branding ==
After the 2015, merger and creation of ONE.VIP, the company continued to offer products and services under the brands Vip, One, blizoo and BoomTV until May 2016 when the company began offering all products and services under the Vip brand.

== Network information ==
The IMSI – Network Codes of Vip are 294-02 and 294-03 and the MSISDN Network Codes are 075 (international: +389 75); 076 (international: +389 76); 077 (international: +389 77) and 078 (international: +389 78).

== Cable Television ==
=== Available TV Channels in Skopje ===
- 24 Kitchen
- 3+
- AGRO TV
- Al Jazeera Balkans
- Alfa
- Alfa HD
- Alsat M
- Alsat M HD
- Arena 1
- Arena 1 HD
- Arena 2
- Arena 3
- Arena 3 HD
- Arena 4
- Arena 4 HD
- Arena 5
- Arena 5 HD
- Arena 8 HD
- Arena eSport
- Arena Fight
- Arena Fight HD
- Arena Premium 1
- Arena Premium 1 HD
- Arena Premium 2
- Arena Premium 2 HD
- Arena Premium 3
- Arena Premium 3 HD
- ATV Avrupa
- B92
- Babes TV
- Baby TV
- Balkan Music
- Balkan Trip
- Balkanika HD
- BBC Earth
- BBC First
- BBF Music
- Bizzare
- Bloomberg
- BNT World
- Boomerang
- Bravo Music
- Brazzers TV
- Bunga Bunga
- Cartoon Network
- Cinemax
- Cinemax 2
- CityPlay
- Click TV
- club MTV
- Club TV
- CMC
- CNN
- Desire
- DM sat
- Docu Box HD
- Dorcel XXX-HD
- Duck TV HD
- DW
- Elrodi TV
- ELTA 1HD
- ELTA 2
- Epic Drama
- Erotic 1
- Erotic 2
- Erotic 3
- Erotic 4
- Erotic 5
- Erotic 6
- Erotic 7
- Erotic 8
- Erox
- Eroxxx HD
- Euronews Albania
- Fast&Fun Box HD
- Fax News
- Fen HD
- Fight Box HD
- Film Box Arthouse
- Film Box Extra HD
- Film Box Plus
- Folk+
- France 24
- Happy TV
- HBO
- HBO 2
- HBO 2 HD
- HBO 3
- HBO 3 HD
- HBO HD
- Jugoton
- Kanal 5
- Kanal 5 HD
- Kanal D Drama
- Kanali 7
- KCN 1
- KCN 2
- KCN 3
- Kitchen TV
- Klan Macedonia
- Klasik TV
- KTV Koha Vision
- Living HD
- Love Nature
- Luxe TV HD
- M1 Film
- M1 Gold
- Mezzo
- Mezzo Live HD
- MRT 1
- MRT 1 HD
- MRT 2
- MRT 2 HD
- MRT 3
- MRT 4
- MRT 5
- MRT Assembly Channel
- MRT Assembly Channel HD
- MTV
- MTV 00's
- MTV 80s
- MTV 90s
- MTV Hits
- MTV Live HD
- Muse
- Museum channel
- Nasha TV
- National Geographic
- News 24
- NG Wild
- Nick Music
- Nickelodeon
- Nickelodeon Jr.
- Pink & Roll
- Pink 3 Info
- Pink Extra
- Pink Fashion
- Pink Film
- Pink Folk
- Pink Folk 2
- Pink Hits 1
- Pink Hits 3
- Pink Kids
- Pink Koncert
- Pink Music
- Pink Music 2
- Pink Plus
- Pink Reality
- Pink World
- Pink Zabava
- Prva
- Prva FILES
- Prva KICK
- Prva LIFE
- Prva MAX
- Prva WORLD
- Reality Kings
- Report TV
- RTK sat
- RTL
- RTL 2
- RTL Kockica
- RTL Living
- RTS Sat
- RTSH 1 HD
- RTSH 24 Lajme
- RTSH 3 HD
- RTSH Muzik
- RTSH Plus
- RTSH Shqip
- Sitel
- Sitel HD
- Sky News
- Smile
- STAR Channel
- STAR Crime
- STAR Life
- STAR Movies
- TDC
- Televizija 24
- Telma
- Telma HD
- Tip TV
- Toxic Folk
- Toxic Rap
- Toxic TV
- Trace Sports
- Trace Urban
- TravelXP
- TravelXP HD
- Tring Action
- Tring Clasic HD
- Tring Collection HD
- Tring Comedy
- Tring Family HD
- Tring Fantasy
- Tring History
- Tring Kids
- Tring Life
- Tring Novela
- Tring Planet
- Tring Series HD
- Tring Shqip
- Tring Sport News HD
- Tring Super HD
- Tring Tring
- Tring World
- TRT Turk
- TV 1
- TV 21 HD
- TV Shenja
- TV Sonce
- TV1000
- TV21
- Viasat Explore
- Viasat History
- Viasat Nature
- Viasat Nature HD
- Vision Plus HD
- Zdrava TV

== See also ==
- Makedonski Telekom
- Telekabel
