= Elta =

ELTA may mean one of the following:

== Broadcasting ==
- ELTA 1 HD, the first commercial HD cable television channel in Bosnia and Herzegovina
- ELTA 2, a commercial music television channel in Bosnia and Herzegovina
- ELTA Technology Co., Ltd., a television channel in Taiwan

== Other ==
- ʿeltā, East Syriac genre of church literature
- ELTA Systems Ltd, an Israeli provider of defense products and services specializing in C^{4}ISTAR products
- Elta (river), a river of Baden-Württemberg, Germany
- ELTA, a Lithuanian news agency
- Hellenic Post (abbreviated ΕΛΤΑ, ELTA), state-owned provider of postal services in Greece
- Elta-Kabel, a Bosnian cable television company based in Doboj
- Elta Danneel Graul, birth name of Danneel Ackles (born 1979), American actress
