= Arija (band) =

Macedonian popular music group

- Origin: Republic of Macedonia
- Genres: Pop
- Years active: 1997–Present
- Members: Filip Pesevski, Zdravko Angelov, Nikola Avtovski, Blagoja Perunovski, Stavre Stavrev, Goran Miloskovski and Juliana Nikolovska
- Past members: Orce Dimitrovski, Dalibor Djosik, Goran Trajkov and Martin Vucic

Arija (in Macedonian Cyrillic: Арија Бенд) is a Macedonian popular music group. The band consists of six members, including Orce Dimitrovski, Zdravko Angelov, Nikola Avtovski, Blagoja Perunovski, Stavre Stavrev, and Dalibor Djosik.

== History ==
=== Early years ===
Arija was formed in 1997, after the members started playing together in high school. The band's first drummer was Goran Trajkov, who played with them for one year.

In 1998 and 1999, the band participated in folk music festivals including "Cvetnici '98" with the song "Koj Ja Ima Ziv Da Ne Bide" and "Cvetnici '99" with the song "Ludo Srce". They also performed on "Valandovo" in 1998, and with songs "Ti Si Nesto Posebno" and "Sonce Moe", in 1999.

In 1999, Martin Vucic joined the band as a drummer. At that time, the band started playing live in one of the most popular TV shows in the country at the time called "Eden plus Dva" ("One plus Two"), hosted by Dragan Vučić on Sitel television.

=== 2000's ===
In 2000, the band released their first pop single called "Na Minuta ili Dve" . In the same year, they released their first album called Pola na Pola. with the leading single "Vo Dnoto na Dusata"...

In 2002, Martin Vucic left the band as solo singer replaced by Stavre Stavrev as a new drummer.

In January 2011, the band released their CD called "Arija - The Best Of".

In September 2011, the band released their single called "Ako Sum Lud".

== Singles ==
From 2001 to 2011, they released the following singles:

- "Samo Gospod e Svedok".
- "Nema Drugo Vreme"
- "Los Den".
- "Prikazna Bez Kraj".
- "Losa Navika".
- "Sega Koga Sum Sam".
- "Veruvaj Vo Ljubovta"
- "Deset Na Eden".
- "Ako Sum Lud".
