= TV Nova (North Macedonia) =

Television NOVA Телевизија НОВА
- Country: North Macedonia
- Broadcast area: North Macedonia
- Network: ТРД Телевизија Нова ДООЕЛ Скопје
- Headquarters: Skopje, North Macedonia

Programming
- Language: Macedonian
- Picture format: 16:9 (576i, SDTV); 16:9 (1080i, HDTV)

Ownership
- Owner: Sead Kochan

History
- Launched: 1 February 2016
- Closed: 13 February 2018

Availability

Terrestrial
- Digital: Channel ?
- Boom TV: Channel ?

Streaming media
- TV Nova: (MKD) Only

TV Nova was a television channel in North Macedonia that started to operate on February 1, 2016. The channel was stationed in Skopje and the chief editor of the news was Biljana Vasileva Trendafilova. The television station ended its operations on February 13, 2018.

The station is considered to have been biased against the political foes of former Prime Minister Nikola Gruevski and the VMRO-DPMNE party and to be close to businessmen allied with Hungarian Prime Minister Viktor Orbán, similar to Alfa TV.

== See also ==
- Television in North Macedonia
