= Dnevnik =

Dnevnik means "The Daily" or "Daily News" in South Slavic languages. It can also be translated as "Diary".

Closely related Slavic variants of the word are Deník (Czech) Dziennik (Polish) and Дневник (Russian).

It may refer to:

In broadcasting

- Dnevnik HRT, a Croatian TV news program broadcast daily on the Croatian Radiotelevision (HRT) at 19:30
- Dnevnik Nove TV, a Croatian TV news program broadcast daily on Nova TV at 19:15
- Dnevnik MRT, a Macedonian TV news program broadcast daily on Macedonian Radio Television (MRT) at 19:30

In print media

- Dnevnik (Bulgaria) (Bulgarian: Дневник), a Bulgarian business-oriented daily published in Sofia
- Dnevnik (Macedonia) (Macedonian: Дневник), a Macedonian daily published in Skopje
- Dnevnik (Serbia) (Serbian Cyrillic: Дневник), a Serbian daily published in Novi Sad
- Dnevnik (Slovenia), a Slovenian daily published in Ljubljana
