= Cosmote =

Greek telecommunications and media company

COSMOTE S.A.
- Trade name: COSMOTE
- Native name: COSMOTE – ΚΙΝΗΤΕΣ ΤΗΛΕΠΙΚΟΙΝΩΝΙΕΣ ΜΟΝΟΠΡΟΣΩΠΗ ΑΝΩΝΥΜΟΣ ΕΤΑΙΡΙΑ
- Type: Division
- Industry: Telecommunications
- Founded: October 3, 1996; 30 years ago
- Defunct: January 2, 2024
- Fate: Merged with OTE
- Headquarters: Marousi, Greece
- Area served: Europe
- Parent: OTE
- Website: cosmote.gr

Cosmote S.A. was the largest mobile network operator in Greece and a division of OTE. It was dissolved and absorbed by its parent on 2 January 2024.

Outside of Greece, previous operations included COSMOFON in North Macedonia (now A1), GLOBUL in Bulgaria (now Yettel), Telekom in Albania (now One) and Telekom in Romania (now Vodafone).

== History ==
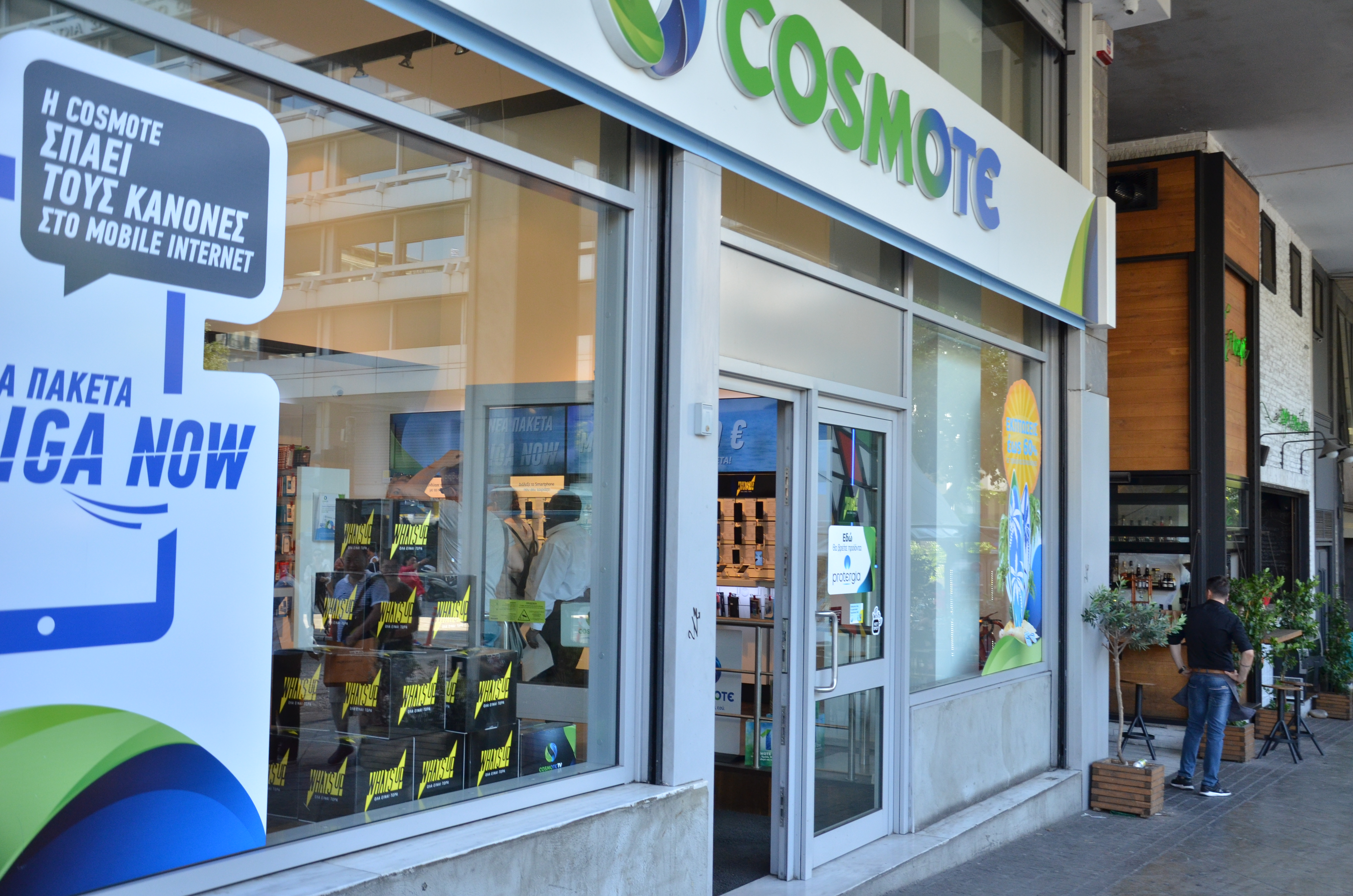
Cosmote shop next to Syntagma Square in Athens

COSMOTE launched commercial operations in Greece in April 1998 and reached 1 million subscribers a year later. In 2000, the company was listed in the Athens Exchange. In 2001, COSMOTE reached a customer base of 2.5 million becoming the largest mobile network operator in Greece.

In 2006, COSMOTE acquired 99% of Germanos SA from its owner Panos Germanos, a multinational chain of retail electronic goods vendors. During the same year COSMOTE was listed among the top performers in the technology industry worldwide according to BusinessWeek's Information Technology 100 rankings, being the only Greek company in the list.

== Subsidiaries ==
Telekom Romania: In July 2005, COSMOTE acquired 70% of the Romanian operator COSMOROM which was the mobile arm of Romanian national incumbent operator Romtelecom. Later that year, COSMOROM was rebranded to COSMOTE Romania. In November 2009, COSMOTE acquired Telemobil SA (Zapp), the first CDMA 450 MHz mobile phone operator in Romania, thereby gaining access to 3G license and infrastructure in the country.

== Sponsorships ==
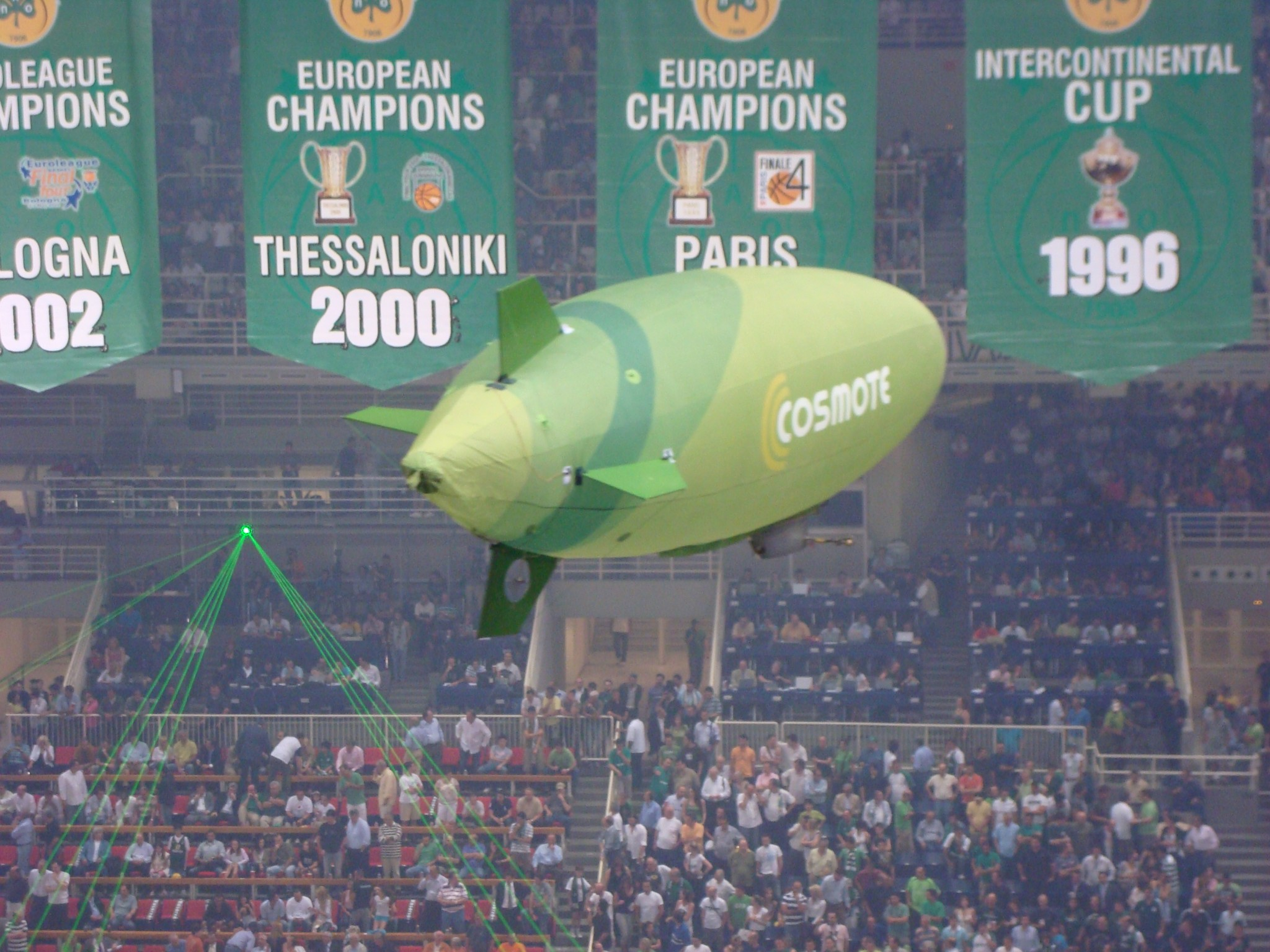
Blimp of COSMOTE in the Telekom Center Athens

Under its Corporate Responsibility (CR) programme, COSMOTE supports actions related to the environment, society, the marketplace, the workplace and public awareness. Actions undertaken in this context include inter alia a joint sponsorship, together with the Hellenic Telecommunications Organization (OTE), of the Athens 2004 Olympic Games. COSMOTE also initiated a Scholarship programme for university studies, awarding scholarships to high school graduates who have been admitted as first year students in higher educational institutions in Greece.

In October 2011, COSMOTE announced that will support, together with OTE, the digitisation of the libraries of the Halki seminary in Constantinople.

In 2012, OTE and COSMOTE announced the sponsorship of the exhibition "The Antikythera Shipwreck: The ship, the Treasures, the Mechanism", of the National Archaeological Museum.

== Financial results ==
Year	Revenues	EBITDA	EBITDA margin
2007	1,735.9 mil. €	724.4 mil. €	41.7%
2008	1,843.1 mil. €	781.9 mil. €	42.4%
2009	2,007.4 mil. €	741.8 mil. €	37%
2010	1,812.1 mil. €	667.6 mil. €	36.8%
2011	1,647.5 mil. €	616.6 mil. €	37.4%
2012	2,057.0 mil. €	755.9 mil. €	36.7%
2013	1,859.8 mil. €	647.6 mil. €	34.1%
2014	1,202 mil. €	431.8 mil. €	35.9%
2015	1,165 mil. €	401.1 mil. €	34.4%
2016	1,121 mil. €	370.1 mil. €	33.1%

== See also ==
- List of mobile network operators in Europe
- OTE Group
