= Cosmofon =

Mobile phone operator in North Macedonia

- Type: limited liability company
- Industry: mobile telecommunications
- Founded: 2003
- Defunct: March 2009
- Fate: acquired by Telekom Slovenije
- Successor: One
- Headquarters: Skopje, North Macedonia
- Products: mobile telephony
- Website: www.cosmofon.mk

Founded in 2003, Cosmofon was the second GSM mobile phone operator in the North Macedonia. The first call through the network of Cosmofon took place on May 16, 2003, and now its network codes are 075 and 076.

Cosmofon commenced its commercial operation on June 12, 2003.

Until March 2009, Cosmofon was a company owned 100% by the Cosmote Group from Greece, Romania Cosmofon, and Bulgaria with its team Cosmofon which is a member of national telecommunications provider of Greece OTE. As of March, Cosmofon had a 30% market share in the Republic of Macedonia, with about 650,000 subscribers.

In 2008, Deutsche Telekom bought a 25% stake in the Greek company, following that investment OTE had to sell Cosmofon, because it had large equity stakes in two large competitors in the Macedonian mobile phone market.

In March 2009, OTE sold its mobile phone unit Cosmofon for 190 million euros to Slovenia's Telekom. The deal also includes Cosmofon's main distribution network 'Germanos Telekom Skopje' with its 66 stores.
