= Toa Sum Jas =

- Also known as: Тоа сум Јас
- Genre: Entertainment; Reality television
- Developed by: Global Kom. & MRT

Original release
- Network: MRT 1
- Release: 23 March 2004

Toa Sum Jas (Macedonian Cyrillic: Тоа сум Јас) was a reality TV show in North Macedonia. The show was the first original show worldwide. The contestants had to be closed from the outside world for 45 days in one house in Skopje. Allegedly the Dutch company Endemol that owns original Big Brother reality show has sued Toa Sum Jas for plagiarism. Dragi Hristov was the winner. Broadcasting Council of Macedonia also filed a misdemeanor charges for "Extremely obscene content may adversely affect the development of young people" to the producers.

== Hosts ==
- Toni Mihajlovski
- Sanja Ristikj

== See also ==
Macedonian Radio Television
