= Prva =

Prva may refer to:

- Prva Srpska Televizija, Serbian television station
- Prva A Liga, top tier of professional basketball in Montenegro
- Prva Crnogorska Fudbalska Liga, Montenegrin First Football League
- Prva Hrvatska Nogometna Liga, Croatian football top division
- Prva Liga Federacija Bosne i Hercegovine, First League of Federation of Bosnia and Herzegovina, second tier of Bosnia and Herzegovina
- Prva Liga Republike Srpske, First League of Republika Srpska, second tier of Bosnia and Herzegovina
- Makedonska Prva Liga
- Slovenian PrvaLiga, Slovenian football first division
- Prva Liga Srbije, 2nd tier of Serbian football league system
- Prva ženska liga, the top level women's football league of Serbia
- Prva Liga Jugoslavije, defunct Yugoslav football top division
- Prva Hercegovačka, Bosnia and Herzegovina television station
