= TV Art =

TV Art may refer to:

- TV Art (North Macedonia), television channel from North Macedonia
- TV Art (Serbia), defunct cultural television channel from Serbia
