= Dnevnik MRT =

- Genre: News programme
- Presented by: Dragi Arbirovski
- Country of origin: Macedonia
- Original language: Macedonian

Production
- Production location: Skopje
- Camera setup: Multi-camera
- Running time: 30-45 minutes

Original release
- Network: MRT 1
- Release: 14 December 1964 – present

Dnevnik MRT is the main news program of the MRT, broadcast daily at 19:30.

== Presenters ==
Years	Presenter Macedonian	Current role
	Dragi Arbirovski	retired
	Blagoja Krstevski	retired
	Branka Stankovska	retired
1966-2004	Liljana Krsteva	retired
1993-2004	Tatjana Stojanovska	TV Host on Channel 5
2000-2006	Dejan Davidovski	n/a
	Biljana Debarlieva	Television Host of "Vizita" on Channel 5
	Marijana Dimovska	tv host
	Bojana Krstevska	n/a
	Dushko Arsovski	n/a
	Gordana Gjorcheva	n/a
2012 - 2016	Goran Petreski	Chief editor of Vest
	Martin Pushevski	Special Rapporteur from London for MRT
	Biljana Vasileva Trendafilova	Chief editor of the news program TV Nova
	Stojan Trpchevski	Dnevnik MRT
	Katerina Topalova	Dnevnik MRT

- This list is not complete

== See also ==
- MRT
- Dnevnik HRT
