= OTE Group =

Greek telecommunication company

Hellenic Telecommunications Organization S.A.
- Type: Public subsidiary
- Traded as: Athex: HTO; LSE: OTES
- Industry: Telecommunications
- Predecessor: A.E.T.E.
- Founded: 23 October 1949; 77 years ago
- Headquarters: Kifisias Avenue 99, Marousi, Athens, Greece
- Area served: Balkans
- Key people: Konstantinos Nebis (Chairman & CEO)
- Products: Fixedline telephony Mobile Telephony; Broadband internet Digital television Fiber-optic communication IT services
- Brands: Telekom
- Revenue: €3.468,9 million (2023)
- Operating income: €715.7 million (2023)
- Net income: €531.7 million (2023)
- Total assets: €92.6 million (2023)
- Total equity: €1.943,8 million (2023)
- Owner: Deutsche Telekom (55.6%); Government of Greece (8%); Public float (36.4%)
- Number of employees: 10,500 (2021)
- Subsidiaries: Germanos; OTE Plc
- Website: telekom.gr

Hellenic Telecommunications Organization S.A. (OTE Group), also known as Hellenic Telekom, is the largest telecommunications and IT company in Greece and a subsidiary of Germany-based Deutsche Telekom. It is also one of the three largest companies listed in the Athens Stock Exchange, according to market capitalization.

OTE Group offers fixed-line and mobile telephony, broadband services, pay television and integrated Information and Communications Technology (ICT). At the same time, the Group is involved in a range of activities, notably satellite communications, real-estate and professional training. Formerly a state-owned monopoly, OTE's privatisation started in 1996 and is now listed on the Athens and London Stock Exchanges.

Since July 2009 Deutsche Telekom is the largest shareholder of the company.

== History ==
OTE was founded on 23 October 1949 as a successor to the Hellenic Telephone Company (AETE), which was established in 1926 to consolidate all such public and private telecommunications companies. Formerly, telephony, telegraph, domestic and international connections were fragmented and under-coordinated.

Until 1998, OTE operated as a state-owned monopoly. The market was opened to competitors and OTE was gradually privatized. Along with other telecommunications market providers, OTE is regulated by the National Telecommunications and Post Commission (EETT).

In 2007, MIG Holdings acquired 20% of the company, while in March 2008, sold it to German Deutsche Telekom, which later increased its stake to 25% plus one, matching that of the state.

Following the sale of a further 5% in 2009 and another 10% in 2011 of OTE's share capital by the Greek state to Deutsche Telekom, the state holds 10% and DT 40%. In 2018, Deutsche Telekom acquired an additional 5% of OTE as it exercised the right of first refusal to acquire 24,507,520 ordinary shares as announced by HDRAF.

== Transition to the Telekom brand ==
In 2015, OTE Group adopted the Telekom brand for its operations in Albania and Romania. However in Greece, they instead adopted Cosmote as their uniform commercial brand in Greece covering fixed, broadband and mobile telephony. The brand was also refreshed and a new logo and strapline introduced.

Whilst Cosmote had always been the brand used for mobile telephony, the company had previously sold fixed (landline) and broadband services under the OTE brand.

No further changes were implemented until 2023, when activities began to raise awareness of the Telekom brand in Greece. In September, after Telekom’s T logo was added to the OTE Group building in Athens, the chief of Deutsche Telekom hinted that the logo may be adopted.

The website, stationery and printed advertisements and billboards were then updated to feature the Telekom logo in addition to the Cosmote branding with the statement "Member of the Telekom Group".

Beginning in 2024, all commercials ended with the slogan "Cosmote, member of the Telekom Group". In addition, a new splash screen of the Telekom branding was added to Cosmote’s television advertisements.

Cosmote also branded various programmes and competitions as "Powered by Telekom" such as Women in Gaming and World Pass to further enhance customer awareness.

In April 2025, the company moved to a transition brand becoming Cosmote Telekom. The brand refresh also included a new tag line ‘Συνδέουμε τον κόσμο σου’ (Connecting your world)

In June 2026, at OTE’s general shareholder meeting, the company CEO announced that Cosmote Telekom became Telekom in autumn 2026.

To reflect the transition to Telekom, the company introduced "Magenta" themed products and services including MagentaONE (previously Cosmote One), Magenta AI, Magenta Moments (previously Cosmote Deals for You), Magenta TV (previously Cosmote TV), Magenta Insurance (previously Cosmote Insurance), and Magenta Pay (previously payzy). The T Phone 3 and T Tablet 2 also launched in Greece.

In addition, the basketball arena at the OAKA (Olympic Athletic Center Athens) has been renamed Telekom Center Athens under a five year deal.

The completion of the transition to the Telekom brand happened on 7 September 2026.

=== 1949–1964 ===
- 23 October 1949: ΟΤΕ S.A. is founded (Legislative Decree 1049/49)
- The first Greek telephone directory is published.
- The TELEX service becomes operational.

=== 1965–1989 ===
- The Greek long-distance telephone network is automated.
- Laying of the submarine cable Greece-Italy MED 3 is completed.
- The first antenna of the Centre of Satellite Communication in Thermopylae (the 6th in Europe) is set up.
- The first fully digitised switching centres (long-distance and hub) of the EWSD/SIEMENS system are established.

=== 1990–2000 ===
- ΟΤΕ expands to the Balkans, SE Europe and the Middle East.
- ΟΤΕ is listed in the Athens Exchange (ASE).
- OTE is listed on the New York Stock Exchange (NYSE).
- OTE acquires an initial 35% stake in RomTelecom, the incumbent telephony company in Romania.
- Acquires GSM License in Bulgaria and establishes Globul to exploit this license.

=== 2000–2007 ===
- Satellite Hellas Sat2 is launched from Cape Canaveral.
- OTE launches ADSL services in the Greek market.
- OTE and COSMOTE act as Grand National Sponsors of the Athens 2004 Olympic Games.
- OTE signs agreement to sell 90% of its holdings in ArmenTel (now Telecom Armenia) for approximately €342 million.
- The Greek State sells 10.7% of OTE share capital to institutional investors.
- OTE makes available new speeds reaching 24 Mbit/s.

=== 2008–2010 ===
- OTE launches CONN-X TV (IPTV) to a limited number of existing clients for a trial period. This satellite TV service was the predecessor of OTE TV.
- OTE's broadband connection reach 970,000, with presence points in its network extend to 1,390, nationwide.
- The agreement between the Greek Government and Deutsche Telekom is signed, according to which, since 5 November, each will own 25% plus one share of OTE's share capital.
- OTE acquires 100% of COSMOTE and its share is listed on the Athens Stock Exchange.
- COSMOTE now owns 100% of GERMANOS SA, the leading retailer of telecommunications in the wider region of Southeast Europe.
- Completion of the sale of Cosmofon in the former Yugoslav Republic of Macedonia held by COSMOTE.
- After the sale of an additional 5% of the Greek State's shares and voting rights, Deutsche Telekom's stake in OTE stands at 30% while the Greek State holds 20%. COSMOTE completes acquisition of Telemobil S.A. (Zapp) in Romania.
- OTE introduces Conn-x TV, which is based on IPTV technology.
- Michael Tsamaz, CEO of OTE Group's mobile arm COSMOTE, assumes the position of OTE President & CEO.
- OTE delists from the New York Stock Exchange.

=== 2011–2026 ===
- Deutsche Telekom acquires an extra 10% of OTE share capital raising its stake to 40%.
- The company signs three-year Collective Labour Agreement with the Federation of OTE Employees OME-OTE, achieving personnel costs reduction and securing employment for OTE regular employees.
- Introduces OTE TV via Satellite and integrates all of the pay TV services it offers under the brand name OTE TV.
- OTE signs agreement for the sale of the minority stake in Telekom Srbija, of which owns 20%, for about €400 million.
- Launches reduced prices of up to 25% for Double Play Unlimited Plans that combine Internet and unlimited telephony to fixed lines.
- OTE TV subscriber base reaches 100.000, following the continuous strengthening of the platform with new channels, services and HD content.
- Launches new VDSL Internet services, with speeds up to 50 Mbit/s.
- Successfully completes two Voluntary Redundancy Schemes, the incentives of which 1,516 people in the company accepted.
- Raises €700 million through 5-year fixed coupon notes, following the successful completion of a bookbuilding process.
- Announces the signing of an agreement to sell its 99.05% stake in Hellas Sat, to Arabsat, for 208 million euros, plus 7 million in dividends.
- Announces the signing of an agreement to sell its 100% stake in Cosmo Bulgaria Mobile EAD (Globul) and Germanos Telecom Bulgaria (Germanos) to Telenor, the Norwegian telecom operator. The agreement consideration reached €717 million (enterprise value).
- OTE announced the expansion of its VDSL network with 367 local exchanges and 2,732 outdoor cabins activated in October and extending VDSL availability to 1.3 million households and businesses.
- On 26 October 2015 it establishes COSMOTE as a single brand for all its products and services.
- In 2017, OTE's management announced that priority is to develop fiber optic networks and that total investment for the period until 2020 will amount to €1.5 billion.
- In 2024, OTE Group announced the consolidation of its Cosmote brand with the Deutsche Telekom brand, forming Cosmote Telekom.
- In 2026, OTE announced that the Cosmote Telekom brand name was changed to "Telekom".

== Shareholding structure ==
Starting in 1996, the Greek State gradually reduced its stake in OTE. Following an agreement between the Greek State and Deutsche Telekom, as of 5 November 2008, each party held 25% plus one share of OTE. After additional transactions, Deutsche Telekom's stake in OTE has risen to 40% while that of the Greek State amounts to 10%.

HRADF announced on 13 February 2018 the opening of a tender procedure for the acquisition of 5% by the Greek state. The competition ended on 16 March 2018, with no interested parties. On the same day, HRADF sent a letter to Deutsche Telekom with a proposal to buy back the shares for €284 million, with a 30-day deadline. Deutsche Telekom exercised its right of first refusal, and the acquisition was completed in May 2018 through the Stock Exchange. Deutsche Telekom currently holds 55% of the company's shares and the Government of Greece owns 1.2%.

== Subsidiaries ==
=== Greece ===
- Telekom eValue (formerly Cosmote eValue) (100%): Contact Center services.
- Germanos (100%): Technology products and telecommunications services.
- Magenta Insurance (formerly Cosmote Insurance) (100%): A solely owned subsidiary of OTE since 1997, specialized in private insurance. It provides its services to OTE Group, its Human Resources, as well as to the general public.
- Telekom Estate (formerly OTE Estate) (100%): Management of OTE Group's real estate assets.
- Telekom Academy (formerly OTE Academy (100%): Education and advanced vocational training. Venues for corporate events and seminars.

=== International subsidiaries ===
- Telekom HBS (formerly COSMOTE Global Solutions)

== Financial data ==
For 2021, the Group announced turnover of €3,368.3 million, for an increase of 3.4%. Adjusted earnings before interest, taxes, depreciation and amortization reached €1,295.9 million, with the EBITDA margin increasing to 38.5%. Adjusted free cash flow came to €590.1 million. The Group's adjusted net debt fell by 25.0%, corresponding to 0.6 times the annual adjusted EBITDA (AL).

OTE GROUP	2007	2008	2009	2010	2011	2012	2013	2014	2015	2016	2017	2018	2019	2020	2021
Revenues	6,319.8	6,407.3	5,958.9	5,482.8	5,038.3	4,680.3	4,054.1	3,918.4	3,902.9	3,908	3,857	3.798,7	3,303	3,259	3.368,3
Adjusted EBITDA	2,240.8	2,320.9	2,168	1,919.4	1,731.8	1,656.9	1,456.3	1,421.6	1,343	1,321	1,304	1.316,8	1,230.1	1,223.6	1.295,9
as % of Revenues	35.5%	36.2%	36.4%	35%	34.4%	35.4%	35%	36.3%	34.4%	33.8%	34.2%	34.7%	37.2%	37.5%	

== OTE Telecoms Museum ==
The Museum of Telecommunications opened up to the public in 1990. The institution is housed within a 1,000-square-metre corporate facility owned by OTE, located at 25 Proteos Street in the New Kifissia district of Athens (postal code 14564). The objective of the museum is the historical research, academic study, and archival documentation of data pertaining to the evolution of telecommunications from antiquity to the contemporary era. Furthermore, the institution holds official membership in the International Committee for the Conservation of the Industrial Heritage (TICCIH).
