= One (Telekom Slovenija Group) =

Former Macedonian GSM/UMTS mobile operator

One Operator d.o.o.
- Type: Public
- Industry: Wireless Services; Telecommunication
- Founded: 2003 as Cosmofon
- Defunct: 2015
- Fate: Merger with Vip operator
- Successor: one.Vip
- Headquarters: Skopje, Macedonia
- Key people: Olliver Poncin (CEO); Dejan Kalinikov (COO); Lea Benedejcic (CCO)
- Products: Mobile networks, Telecom services, etc.
- Owner: Telekom Slovenije
- Website: Official site

One was a Macedonian GSM/UMTS mobile operator. The company was under a 100-per-cent ownership of Telekom Slovenije. The network of One was covering 99,9% of the population and 98,17% of the territory of Macedonia with quality signal.

One has launched the first DVB-T in Macedonia, BoomTV.

One used to host its network at a mobile virtual network operator called Albafone. It started operations in 2013 and ceased operations in 2015.

In 2015, One merged with Vip operator into one mobile network operator - one.Vip, under the name Vip, with Telekom Austria (Vip) having an equity interest of 55% and Telekom Slovenije (One) having an equity interest of 45%. The agreement includes options for the exit of the Telekom Slovenije Group within three years of the transaction's closing date.

In November 2017, One was sold to Telekom Austria.
