= Turkey in the Eurovision Song Contest 2005 =

- Eurovision Song Contest 2005
- Participating broadcaster: Türkiye Radyo ve Televizyon Kurumu (TRT)
- Country: Turkey
- Selection process: 27. Eurovision Şarkı Yarışması Türkiye Finali
- Selection date: 11 February 2005

Competing entry
- Song: "Rimi Rimi Ley"
- Artist: Gülseren
- Songwriters: Göksan Arman; Erdinç Tunç

Placement
- Final result: 13th, 92 points

Participation chronology

Turkey was represented at the Eurovision Song Contest 2005 with the song "Rimi Rimi Ley", composed by Erdinç Tunç, with lyrics by Göksan Arman, and performed by Gülseren. The Turkish participating broadcaster, Türkiye Radyo ve Televizyon Kurumu (TRT), selected its entry through the national final 27. Eurovision Şarkı Yarışması Türkiye Finali. Seven artists and song competed in a televised show on 11 February 2005 where the winner, "Rimi Rimi Ley" performed by Gülseren, was selected by a 17-member jury panel.

As one of the nine highest placed finishers in the 2004 contest, Turkey automatically qualified to compete in the final of the Eurovision Song Contest 2005. Performing during the show in position 6, the nation placed thirteenth out of the 24 participating countries in the final, scoring 92 points.

== Background ==
Prior to the 2005 contest, Türkiye Radyo ve Televizyon Kurumu (TRT) had participated in the Eurovision Song Contest representing Turkey 26 times since its first entry in 1975. It missed the 1979 contest because Arab countries pressured the Turkish government to withdraw from the contest because of the dispute over the Status of Jerusalem, and 1994 contest due to a poor average score from the preceding contests, which ultimately led to relegation. It had won the contest once: in 2003 with the song "Everyway That I Can" performed by Sertab Erener. Its least successful result was in 1987 when it placed 22nd (last) with the song "Şarkım Sevgi Üstüne" by Seyyal Taner and Lokomotif, receiving 0 points in total.

As part of its duties as participating broadcaster, TRT organises the selection of its entry in the Eurovision Song Contest and broadcasts the event in the country. The broadcaster has used various methods to select its entry in the past, such as internal selections and televised national finals. In order to select its entry at the 2005 contest, the broadcaster opted to organise a national final to select both the artist and song.

== Before Eurovision ==
=== 27. Eurovision Şarkı Yarışması Türkiye Finali ===
27. Eurovision Şarkı Yarışması Türkiye Finali was the national final organised by TRT in order to select its entry for the Eurovision Song Contest 2005. Seven acts competed during the show held on 11 February 2005 at the TRT Arı Studio in Ankara, hosted by Meltem Ersan Yazgan and Bülent Özveren with the winner being selected by an expert jury. The show was broadcast on TRT 1 and TRT Int as well as online via the broadcaster's official website trt.net.tr.

==== Competing entries ====
TRT opened a submission period for interested artists and songwriters to submit their entries between 16 August 2004 and 29 November 2004. All performers, composers, lyricists and arrangers were required to be citizens of Turkey, and songs were required to be written in Turkish. At the closing of the deadline, the broadcaster received 136 submissions. A 15-member committee consisting of Serpil Akıllıoğlu, Süleyman Erguner, Deniz Çakmakoğlu, Ümran Sönmezer, Muhsin Yıldırım, Adnan Süer, Tülay İtler Sunar, Neşet Ruacan, Kamil Özler, Garo Mafyan, Melih Kibar, İzzet Öz, Bülend Özveren, Ali Durgut, and Zafer Ası selected seven entries from the received submissions to compete in the national final. The competing songs were announced on 9 December 2004, while the artists were announced on 12 January 2005. Among the competing artists was former Eurovision Song Contest entrant Sedat Yüce who represented Turkey in 2001. On 18 January 2005, TRT announced that Elya and Grup Ariana would replace Mine as the performer of the song "Sen Benim Aşkımsın".

==== Final ====
The final took place on 11 February 2005. Seven entries competed and the winner, "Rimi Rimi Ley" performed by Gülseren, was determined by the votes of a 17-member jury panel consisting of Ali Durgut, Adnan Süer, Kenan Macit, Muhsin Yıldırım, Melih Kibar, Ümran Sönmezer, Garo Mafyan, Süleyman Erguner, Arda Aydoğan, Osman İşmen, Semiha Yankı, İzzet Öz, Neşet Ruacan, Tülay İlter Sunar, Kamil Özler, Aykut Berber and Tevfik Kadri Anarat. The songwriters of the winning entry were awarded a monetary prize of 50,000 YTL.

In addition to the performances of the competing entries, jury member and Semiha Yankı (who represented Turkey in 1975) as well as Ruslana (who won Eurovision for Ukraine in 2004) performed as guests.

Final – 11 February 2005
R/O	Artist	Song	Songwriter(s)	Points	Place
1	Elya and Grup Ariana	"Sen Benim Aşkımsın"	Ümran Akdokur, İrfan Akdokur	0	3
2	Seçil Hüner Yapakçı	"Rumuz Andante"	Selahattin Erhan	4	2
3	Gülseren	"Rimi Rimi Ley"	Göksan Arman, Erdinç Tunç	13	1
4	Nursel Efe	"Tek İsteğim"	Nursel Efe, Serkan Sönmez	0	3
5	Barış	"Yana Yana"	Göksan Arman, Erdinç Tunç	0	3
6	Murat Türkücüoğlu	"Saydam"	Murat Türkücüoğlu	0	3
7	Sedat Yüce	"Yeniden"	Sedat Yüce	0	3

=== Controversy ===
Controversy surrounding the Turkish national final emerged when a panel of 17 judges was charged with finding a winner, as TRT had initially announced that the national final would be held over three days and involve televoting. The winner, Gülseren, was also accused of rigging the final result. After the national final, Umran Akdokur, songwriter of "Sen Benim Aşkımsın" performed by Elya and the group Ariana, officially asked the court in Ankara to cancel the outcome, claiming that "Rimi Rimi Ley" had contradicted a number of requirements as set by the board of TRT, such as that all songs should be "original, not used for commercial purposes and not broadcast before the Turkish national final" and that its songwriter Göksan Arman had been working for the TRT Grand Orchestra. The court of Ankara rejected all complaints against the entry on 8 May 2005.

== At Eurovision ==
According to Eurovision rules, all nations with the exceptions of the host country, the "Big Four" (France, Germany, Spain and the United Kingdom), and the ten highest placed finishers in the 2004 contest are required to qualify from the semi-final on 19 May 2005 in order to compete for the final on 21 May 2005; the top ten countries from the semi-final progress to the final. As Turkey finished fourth in the 2004 contest, the nation automatically qualified to compete in the final. On 22 March 2005, an allocation draw was held which determined the running order and Turkey was set to perform in position 6 in the final, following the entry from Norway and before the entry from Moldova. Turkey placed thirteenth in the final, scoring 92 points.

Both the semi-final and the final was broadcast in Turkey on TRT 1 and TRT Int. TRT appointed Meltem Ersan Yazgan as its spokesperson to announce the results of the Turkish televote during the final.

=== Voting ===
Below is a breakdown of points awarded to Turkey and awarded by Turkey in the semi-final and grand final of the contest. The nation awarded its 12 points to Moldova in the semi-final and to Ukraine in the final of the contest.

==== Points awarded to Turkey ====
Points awarded to Turkey (Final)
Score	Country
12 points	France; Netherlands
10 points	Belgium; Germany
8 points	Albania; Bosnia and Herzegovina; Denmark
7 points	Austria
6 points	Switzerland
5 points	
4 points	Macedonia
3 points	Bulgaria; Romania
2 points	
1 point	United Kingdom

==== Points awarded by Turkey ====
Points awarded by Turkey (Semi-final)
Score	Country
12 points	Moldova
10 points	Macedonia
8 points	Hungary
7 points	Romania
6 points	Israel
5 points	Bulgaria
4 points	Ireland
3 points	Belarus
2 points	Norway
1 point	Poland

Points awarded by Turkey (Final)
Score	Country
12 points	Greece
10 points	Bosnia and Herzegovina
8 points	Malta
7 points	Moldova
6 points	Hungary
5 points	Macedonia
4 points	Romania
3 points	Israel
2 points	Albania
1 point	United Kingdom
