= Obiteljska televizija Valentino =

- Country: Bosnia and Herzegovina
- Headquarters: Brčko

Programming
- Language: Bosnian
- Picture format: 4:3 576i SDTV

Ownership
- Owner: "DENI–COMPANI" d.o.o. Brčko
- Key people: Dragan Veselčić
- Sister channels: VALENTINO ETNO; VALENTINO MUSIC; PRVA HERCEGOVAČKA; Valentino Folk

History
- Launched: 19 June 2006

Links
- Website: www.valentinobh.com

Obiteljska televizija Valentino or OTV Valentino is a Bosnian commercial cable television channel based in Bijela in Brčko District.

The program is mainly produced in the Bosnian language and it is available via cable systems throughout Bosnia and Herzegovina. The channel broadcasts content that is interesting to Bosnian diaspora.

In the media market of BiH, Obiteljska televizija Valentino is a part of the media group called DENI-COMPANI along with sister TV channels: VALENTINO ETNO, Valentino Music HD, PRVA HERCEGOVAČKA and radio station called Obiteljski Radio Valentino.
