= Prva Hercegovačka =

- Country: Bosnia and Herzegovina
- Headquarters: Brčko

Programming
- Language: Bosnian
- Picture format: 4:3 576i SDTV

Ownership
- Owner: "Deni-Compani" d.o.o. za unutrašnju i vanjsku trgovinu i zastupanje, Brčko Distrikt BiH
- Key people: Dragan Veselčić
- Sister channels: OTV Valentino; Obiteljska televizija Valentino; Valentino Etno; Valentino Music; Valentino Folk

History
- Launched: 2015

Links
- Website: www.valentinobh.com

Prva Hercegovačka is a Bosnian commercial cable television channel. The channel is intended for audience in Herzegovina region, although it broadcast from headquarters located in the Brčko, Bosnia and Herzegovina. This television channel mainly broadcasts Croatian music and the program is produced in Croatian. The channel is available via cable systems throughout the Bosnia and Herzegovina.
