= Kanal 5 plus =

Kanal 5 plus Канал 5 плус
- Country: North Macedonia
- Broadcast area: satellite
- Headquarters: Skopje, North Macedonia

Programming
- Language: Macedonian
- Picture format: 4:3 (576i, SDTV)

Ownership
- Owner: SBS Broadcasting Group; ProSiebenSat.1 Media
- Sister channels: Kanal 5 Kanal 5 HD

History
- Launched: 2010

Links
- Website: www.kanal5.com.mk

Availability

Terrestrial
- Boom TV: Channel 029

Streaming media
- WebMax TV: Watch Live (MKD) Only
- OnNet: Watch Live (MKD) Only

Kanal 5 plus is a privately owned satellite television channel in North Macedonia.
