= Martin Vučić =

Macedonian singer (born 1982)

Martin Vučić Мартин Вучиќ
- Born: Martin Vučić; Skopje, SR Macedonia, SFR Yugoslavia
- Genres: Pop
- Occupations: Drummer, singer, composer
- Years active: 2003–present
- Labels: City Records, MRT
- Website: www.martinvucic.com

Martin Vučić (Macedonian: Мартин Вучиќ) is a Macedonian singer.

== Biography ==
He finished elementary school in Skopje and expressed his interests in music at an early age. He started playing drums at the age of 3 and at the age of 7, he participated at numerous music festivals for children. He represented Macedonia at the Eurovision Song Contest 2005, finishing 17th with the song "Make My Day". He won second place at Ohrid Fest with the song "Rano mi e da se vrzam". The song was ranked as the 'Most Popular Song of the Year 2002' in the Republic of Macedonia. At the 2002 Budva festival in Serbia and Montenegro, he won the prize awarded by journalists and critics. He was voted as the 'Discovery of the Year 2002' in the country, winning an album contract with BKSound. He was also voted 'Discovery of the Year 2002' in the Republic of Macedonia. He won the Interpretation Award at Mak fest for the song "Harem". He was 'Singer of the Year 2004' in Macedonia and also won 'Duet of the Year'. He has been invited to appear on one of Turkey's most popular TV shows. In Turkey he is known as ‘Macedonian Tarkan’. Vučić has been selected as an exclusive star for City Records.

To date, Martin has released two albums, Rano Mi E Da Se Vrzam (It's Too Early To Get Tied Down) and Muza (Muse). The title song "Muza" was composed by Macedonian artist Toše Proeski and the album also included a duet with Croatian star Danijela Martinović. Vučić recently promoted a Serbian version of "Muza", titled "Put Do Istine" ("Road To The Truth"). During the Eurovision Song Contest 2006, Vučić was chosen to read out the Macedonian televotes to Greece and sang a song in Greek — "Maria Me Ta Kitrina" to Maria Menounos. Much later that year, he was a runner up at the Sunčane Skale Festival with the song "Tise Kucaj Srce Moje", a duet with Goran Karan.

In the media, he is famous for being a very good friend of Toše Proeski who composed the song title of the album Muza.

On 2 August 2008, Martin released an instrumental album containing tradition dance (ora) instrumentals composed by his grandfather, Pece Atanasovski.

He is a master of Music Art and is a docent at the Music Academy for percussion.

He works at Macedonian Philharmony and is a member of Big bend- Macedonian Radio Television.

In 2018, he became the general manager for the national ensemble of Macedonian folk dances and songs, Tanec.

== Discography ==
=== Albums ===
- Rano e da se vrzam/Rano mi je da se vezem
- Muza
- Makedonski zvuci/Macedonian Sounds

=== Singles ===
- 2005: "Make My Day"
- 2006: "Tise kucaj srce moje"
- 2007: "Biber i čokolada"

Preceded by Toše Proeski with "Life"	Macedonia in the Eurovision Song Contest; 2005	Succeeded by Elena Risteska with "Ninanajna"
