= MRT 4 (TV channel) =

- Country: North Macedonia
- Broadcast area: North Macedonia
- Headquarters: Skopje, North Macedonia

Programming
- Language: minority languages in North Macedonia
- Picture format: 16:9 (576i, SDTV)

Ownership
- Owner: Macedonian Radio-Television
- Sister channels: MRT 1 MRT 1 HD; MRT 2 MRT 3 MRT Sobraniski Kanal; MRT Sat; MRT 2 Sat

History
- Launched: 2020

Links
- Website: www.mrt.com.mk

Availability

Terrestrial
- Digital: 4

Streaming media
- MRT Play: Watch Live (MKD) Only

MRT 4 is a Macedonian television channel owned and operated by Macedonian Radio Television. From 2020, All other programs in minority languages from MRT 2 moved to MRT 4.
