= TV Art (North Macedonia) =

TV Art ТВ Арт
- Country: North Macedonia
- Broadcast area: North Macedonia
- Headquarters: Tetovo; North Macedonia

Programming
- Language(s): Macedonian, Albanian
- Picture format: 16:9 (576i, SDTV); 16:9 (1080i, HDTV)

Ownership
- Owner: Artan Skenderi

History
- Closed: 30 December 2014 (National level)

Availability

Terrestrial
- Analog: Channel ?
- Digital: Channel 17
- Boom TV: Channel 14

TV Art is a television channel in North Macedonia started in 1992 and closed down for political reasons on 2016.

== See also ==
- Television in North Macedonia
