= Gülseren =

Turkish-born French singer (born 1973)

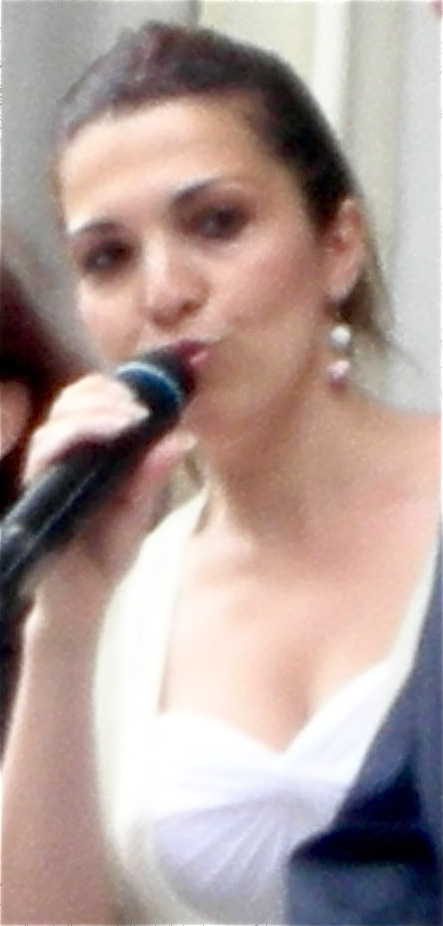

Background information
- Born: Gülseren Yıldırım; 1973 (age 52–53); Istanbul, Turkey
- Origin: Paris, France
- Occupations: Singer, songwriter, dancer
- Instruments: Vocals, darbuka
- Years active: 1997–present
- Website: gulseren.com

Gülseren Yıldırım (born 1973) is a Turkish-French singer, whose output covers a wide range of genres, including pop, Latin, techno, and traditional Turkish music. Despite having lived in France for most of her life, she was selected to represent the country of her birth in the Eurovision Song Contest 2005, held in Kyiv, Ukraine.

== Early life ==
She was born in Istanbul, Turkey. Having moved to Paris at the age of seven, Gülseren took a number of steps as the years progressed to remain engaged with her Turkish background. She studied at the French university INALCO, which specialises in Eastern culture, and she also gave Turkish language lessons to Parisian children.

== Musical career ==
Between 1997 and 1999, she forged her experience as a singer by giving nightly performances at the Parisian cabaret venue "Les Trois Mailletz", which showcases jazz and world music. She also performed in venues across Europe, in particular returning to Turkey on many occasions.

Gülseren tried her hand at acting when she played herself in the made-for-television Dutch film Roos and Rana, which hit screens in April 2001. The film focused on the relationship between two girls, one Dutch and the other Turkish, and how it impacts upon their families.

In early 2005, Gülseren threw her hat in the ring in the competition to represent Turkey in the Eurovision Song Contest 2005. After tentative plans for a public televote were dropped, the selection of the country's Eurovision entry instead rested with a seventeen-strong jury, for whom Gülseren's performance of "Rimi Rimi Ley" proved to be the decisive favourite. The song was uncompromisingly faithful to Turkish musical traditions – somewhat in contrast to the country's entries in 2003 and especially 2004 – and was criticised by 2003 Eurovision winner Sertab Erener for lacking the broad international appeal necessary to achieve a good result. However, it can also be seen as a response to the result of the 2004 contest, in which identifiably 'ethnic' songs, including the Serbian-Montenegrin entry, proved to be successful vote-grabbers.

Due to the placing of Turkey's 2004 representatives Athena on home soil in Istanbul, Gülseren qualified directly for the grand final on 21 May, in which she finished 13th with 92 points. Turkey participated in the semi-final of the 2006 contest in Greece after finishing 13th in the 2005 contest.

Achievements
Preceded by Athena with "For Real"	Turkey in the Eurovision Song Contest; 2005	Succeeded by Sibel Tüzün with "Süper Star"
