= Šterjo Nakov =

Macedonian businessman (born 1948)

- Штерјо Наков
- Born: 1948 (age 77–78); Skopje, PR Macedonia, SFR Yugoslavia
- Education: Skopje University
- Occupations: President of Managing, Board and General Manager, President of Supervision Board at Feršped AD
- Employer: Feršped AD
- Military career
- Allegiance: Yugoslavia
- Branch: Yugoslav People's Army
- Rank: Private

Šterjo Nakov (Macedonian: Штерјо Наков; born 1948) is a Macedonian businessman of Aromanian descent. He is Honorary Consul of Romania in North Macedonia.

== Companies ==
- Feršped AD (1995)
- Hotel Aleksandar Palace
- Hotel Metropol - Ohrid (2004)
- Skovin Winery (2001)
- Feršped Broker

Allegedly, he owns businesses in the ports of Thessaloniki, Greece, and Durrës, Albania; these have never been confirmed.

== Former companies ==
- Alfa TV (2008–2012)
- Rabotnichki Basketball Club (2000–2009)

== Media ==
Nakov was portrayed in the satirical animated TV Show Ednooki in 2007 and 2008.

== Wealth ==
Rankings:

- 2012 2nd by Forbes ranking of Macedonian businessman
- 2014 2nd by European Research Company for wealth

== Awards ==
- (North Macedonia) 2008 Order of the Holy Macedonian Cross
