= Germanos Group =

Greek holding company

Germanos Industrial and Trading S.A. of Electronic-Telecommunications Equipment and Provision of Telecommunications Services
- Native name: ΓΕΡΜΑΝΟΣ ΑΝΩΝΥΜH ΒΙΟΜΗΧΑΝΙΚΗ ΚΑΙ ΕΜΠΟΡΙΚΗ ΕΤΑΙΡΕΙΑ ΗΛΕΚΤΡΟΝΙΚΟΥ-ΤΗΛΕΠΙΚΟΙΝΩΝΙΑΚΟΥ ΥΛΙΚΟΥ ΚΑΙ ΠΑΡΟΧΗΣ ΥΠΗΡΕΣΙΩΝ ΤΗΛΕΠΙΚΟΙΝΩΝΙΑΣ
- Romanized name: Germanos Anonymh Viomichaniki Kai Emporiki Etaireia Ilektronikou-Tilepikoinoniakou Ylikou Kai Parochis Ypiresion Tilepikoinonias
- Type: Subsidiary
- Industry: Retail
- Founded: November 15, 1989; 36 years ago
- Founder: Panos Germanos
- Headquarters: Marousi, Greece
- Area served: Greece
- Key people: Athanasios Stratos (President & CEO)
- Revenue: ▼€329.61 million (2014)
- Net income: ▼€18.87 million (2014)
- Total assets: ▼€307.68 million (2014)
- Total equity: ▼€208.22 million (2014)
- Number of employees: 2,613 (2014)
- Parent: OTE
- Website: germanos.gr

Germanos (Greek: Γερμανός) is a Greek holding company based in Athens, Greece. The Germanos chain of stores is a multinational rook chain of retail electronic goods vendors. They specialize in offering electronic devices such as computers, digital cameras, mp3 players and mobile phones. They also offer fixed and mobile telephony as well as internet.

== History ==
The Group started as a battery shop in Athens in 1980 and since then has expanded into retail when it opened its first store by the same year. In 2003 Germanos in a joint operation with Folli Follie bought a 40% stake of the Hellenic Duty Free shops. In 2006 it was acquired by Cosmoholding Cyprus Ltd., a subsidiary of the mobile operator Cosmote (now Telekom Greece).

== Battery manufacturing ==
Germanos Group's focus is battery manufacturing for vehicles and electronic devices, while the retail part of electronic goods is given to the chain of stores by the same name.

== Cosmote controversy ==
In the beginning Germanos stores offered in Greece mobile connections with Telestet (now Nova) and Cosmote (now Telekom Greece). Later, in 2005 Vodafone Greece gave permission to Germanos to offer its connections. In 2006 when a subsidiary of Cosmote bought the company, Wind and Vodafone pulled their support from the stores, stating that it would lead to unfair treatment towards them in order to enhance support to its in-house mobile operator.

== Environment ==
The Germanos Group has been operating a battery recycling program called Dias Bat since 2004. In every Germanos Store batteries are collected and given for recycling, thus reducing the negative effect of battery consumption to the environment.

== International expansion ==
Germanos stores expanded throughout the last years in Greece, Cyprus and many Eastern European countries counting as of 2007 960 retail points.

Germanos retail stores are found in:

- Greece
- Cyprus
- North Macedonia (sold to Telekom Slovenije)
- Poland
- Romania
- Ukraine
