= Elta-Kabel =

Bosnian telecommunications company

ELTA-KABEL
- Trade name: Elta Kabel
- Native name: ELTA-KABEL d.o.o.
- Company type: LLC (Private)
- Industry: Cable broadband Cable television Digital television Telecommunication
- Defunct: 12 September 2022
- Headquarters: Doboj, Bosnia and Herzegovina
- Area served: Bosnia and Herzegovina
- Products: Cable broadband Cable television Digital television Fixed telephony Mobile Operator
- Website: www.elta-kabel.com

Elta Kabel (full legal name: ELTA-KABEL d.o.o.) is the biggest cable television and broadband Internet and mobile service provider in Republika Srpska entity and one of CATV operators in Bosnia and Herzegovina.

Elta Kabel services are available in the following Bosnian 30 cities around BIH:
