= TV Era =

TV ERA is a television channel based in Skopje, North Macedonia that broadcasts exclusively in the Albanian language. its audience is mainly the country's Albanian population. Among the channel's most famous broadcasts have been the live music show called Black and White, which features popular singers, and the festival Nota Fest. One of its most notable show conductors is Arian Demolli, originally from Albania.
