= MRT 3 (TV channel) =

Macedonian sports and film TV channel

- Country: North Macedonia
- Broadcast area: North Macedonia
- Headquarters: Skopje, North Macedonia

Programming
- Language: Macedonian
- Picture format: 16:9 (576i, SDTV); 16:9 (1080i, HDTV)

Ownership
- Owner: Macedonian Radio-Television
- Sister channels: MRT 1 MRT 2 MRT 4 MRT 5 MRT Sobraniski Kanal; MRT Sat; MRT 2 Sat

History
- Launched: 2014

Links
- Website: www.mrt.com.mk

Availability

Terrestrial
- Boom TV: ?

Streaming media
- MRT Play: Watch Live (MKD) Only

MRT 3 (Macedonian: МРТ 3, romanized: MRT tri) is a television channel in North Macedonia owned and operated by Macedonian Radio-Television. The channel previously focused on sports content and films, but is now home to music shows and entertainment series.

== History ==
In 2013, MRT 3 was a test channel and broadcast with the Blizoo television service provider.

In May 2014, the Macedonian Radio Television launched MRT 3, an sports channel. All TV service providers tuned to these new channels in late-May to mid-June.

On 28 September 2026, MRT 3 was overhauled with a new program schedule. This was due to a change of format, and the station becoming 24-hour music and entertainment channel. This was due to MRT losing most of its sports content.
