= VIP Operator =

Vip Operator DOOEL Skopje
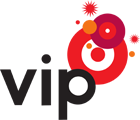
- mobilkom austria group
- Type: Privately held company
- Industry: Wireless Services; Telecommunication
- Founded: March 26, 2007; 19 years ago
- Defunct: September 3, 2019
- Headquarters: Skopje, North Macedonia
- Key people: Mislav Galler-Executive Director,
- Products: GPRS, GSM
- Owners: A1 Telekom Austria Group
- Website: www.vip.mk

Vip Operator was a mobile network operator in North Macedonia and a member of the A1 Telekom Austria Group.

== History ==
On March 26, 2007, Vip operator acquired the third license for mobile communications operation from the Macedonian Agency for Electronic Communications, worth EUR 10 million, after winning the tender for the 10 year GSM 900/1800 license. Vip operator's commercial start was on 19 September 2007, only six months after acquiring the license.

In May 2008, Vip operator signed strategic partnership with the global brand Vodafone and by September 2011, it had a population coverage of more than 99% with its own network.

In July 2014 Vip launched its advanced 4G LTE network and by the end of 2014, it had over 622.000 customers with a market share of 28%.

Since 3 September 2019, Vip Operator was rebranded to A1 following the rebrand by A1 subsidiaries in Serbia and Croatia.

== Network information ==
The IMSI - Network Code of Vip is 294-03 and the MSISDN Network Codes are 077 (international: +389 77) and 078 (international: +389 78).

Vip operator is the Macedonian network of the Vodafone Group, as per agreement announced on 20 May 2008.

== See also ==
- Telekom Austria
- one.Vip
