= Star Channel (Bulgarian TV channel) =

Bulgarian television channel

- Country: Bulgaria
- Headquarters: Sofia, Bulgaria

Programming
- Languages: Bulgarian; English (with subtitles)
- Picture format: 16:9 (1080i, HDTV)

Ownership
- Owner: The Walt Disney Company EMEA (Disney Entertainment)
- Sister channels: Star Life; Star Crime; National Geographic Channel; Nat Geo Wild; BabyTV; 24Kitchen

History
- Launched: 15 October 2012
- Former names: Fox (2012-2023)

Links
- Website: starchannel-bg.com

Final logo as Fox, used from 2019 to 2023

Star Channel, formerly known as Fox, is a Bulgarian general entertainment pay television channel owned by the local subdivision of the EMEA division of the Walt Disney Company and launched on 15 October 2012.

Four years after Disney acquired its previous owner Fox Networks Group, Disney announced a rebranding of all Fox channels in Bulgaria (including Fox Crime and Fox Life) to "Star", thus Star Channel, Star Crime and Star Life instead respectively, which took effect on 1 October 2023.

== Programming ==
=== Current programming ===
- 4400
- 9-1-1
- Beacon
- The Big Bang Theory
- Bones
- Castle
- Clarice
- CSI: Miami
- The Equalizer
- Hawaii Five-0
- Lost
- Magnum P.I.
- Malcolm in the Middle
- NCIS: Hawai'i
- Orphan Black: Echoes
- Only Murders in the Building
- SEAL Team
- The Simpsons
- Tracker
- Young Rock

=== Former programming ===
- 9-1-1: Lone Star
- Agent Carter
- Agents of S.H.I.E.L.D.
- America's Got Talent
- America’s Funniest Home Videos
- American Dad!
- American Crime Story
- American Horror Story
- The Americans
- Anger Management
- Bedlam
- Brand X with Russell Brand
- Brickleberry
- Buffy the Vampire Slayer
- Chuck
- Dark Angel
- Da Vinci's Demons
- Dexter
- Dharma & Greg
- Empire
- Enlisted
- Entourage
- ER
- The Flash
- Friends with Better Lives
- The Goldbergs
- Graceland
- Harper's Island
- House
- How I Met Your Mother
- How to Live with Your Parents (For the Rest of Your Life)
- I Cesaroni
- Joe
- La Brea
- Las Vegas
- Last Man Standing
- Legends
- The Listener
- MacGyver
- The Millers
- Misfits
- Mixed-ish
- Mixology
- Modern Family
- NCIS: Los Angeles
- The New Normal
- Nip/Tuck
- The Phantom
- Psycho
- Rush
- Saint George
- Salem
- Sherlock
- Sinbad
- The Strain
- Tandem
- Titanic: Blood and Steel
- True Blood
- True Lies
- Two and a Half Men
- Tyrant
- Walker
- The Walking Dead
- War of the Worlds
- Wayward Pines
- White Collar
- The X Factor (US)
