= TV Sonce =

TV Sonce ТВ Сонце
- Country: North Macedonia
- Broadcast area: North Macedonia
- Headquarters: Skopje, North Macedonia

Programming
- Language: Macedonian
- Picture format: 4:3 576i, SDTV

Ownership
- Owner: Gjorgjija Atanasoski
- Key people: Vladimir Spasikj, Aleksandar Keltanovski, Igor Mickovski, Brane Stefanovski

History
- Launched: 1999
- Closed: 2026

Availability

Terrestrial
- Analog: Channel ?
- Digital: Channel ?
- Boom TV: Channel ?

Streaming media
- WebMax TV: Watch Live (MKD) Only
- OnNet: Watch Live (MKD) Only

TV Sonce was a local television station in North Macedonia. it was founded in 1999. It was closed in 2026 in certain cities due to not working.

== Line up ==
- Sunlight (Macedonian: Сончевина)
- Macedonia Mother of the earth (Macedonian: Македонија Мајка на земјата)
- News (Macedonian: Вести)
