= Bijela, Brčko =

Bijela Бијела
- Village
- Location within Bosnia and Herzegovina
- Coordinates: 44°47′24″N 18°33′39″E
- Country: Bosnia and Herzegovina
- Entity: Brčko District

Area
  - Total: 7.67 sq mi (19.87 km^{2})

Population (2013)
  - Total: 1,923
  - Density: 250.7/sq mi (96.78/km^{2})
- Time zone: UTC+1 (CET)
  - Summer (DST): UTC+2 (CEST)

Bijela (Serbian Cyrillic: Бијела) is a village in Bosnia and Herzegovina located approximately 25 kilometers south of the city of Brčko on the Brčko - Banovići railway line. It is the largest village in the Brčko District with approximately 2,000 inhabitants. A hill above the village is the site of some Stećci.

== Demographics ==
According to the 2013 census, its population was 1,923.

Ethnicity in 2013
Ethnicity	Number	Percentage
Croats	1,733	90.1%
Serbs	155	8.1%
Bosniaks	19	0.8%
other/undeclared	16	1.0%
Total	1,923	100%
