= Dragan Vučić =

Macedonian musician (1955–2020)

Dragan Vučić (Macedonian: Драган Вучиќ; 6 September 1955 – 4 May 2020) was a Macedonian composer, singer, bass guitar player, philanthropist and TV host.

His most famous songs include "Svirajte zajdi zajdi", "Anđeli me vode", and "Kaži zvezdo", among others.

Dragan was born in Skopje, SFR Yugoslavia, today in North Macedonia. Dragan composed numerous pop hits such as Svirete Ja Zajdi Zajdi, Angeli Me Nosat, Kaži Zvezdo and many more. In the 1980s he was a singer and bass guitar player of pop-folk band Tavce Gravce, and in the 1990s he was the lead singer and bass guitar player of the pop-folk band Koda. He composed the song Make My Day, chosen to represent Macedonia in the Eurovision Song Contest 2005. Later in his career from 1996 until 2020 he started hosting various TV shows on many TV channels in Macedonia.

== Death ==
Vučić suffered from complications after contracting COVID-19 during the COVID-19 pandemic in North Macedonia in April 2020. He died on 4 May 2020, in the infectious clinic in Skopje, aged 65.
