= Naša TV =

Naša TV Наша ТВ
- Country: North Macedonia
- Broadcast area: North Macedonia
- Headquarters: Skopje, North Macedonia

Programming
- Language: Macedonian
- Picture format: 16:9 (1080p, HDTV) (Downscaled to 16:9 576i (SDTV feed)

Ownership
- Owner: Risto Gogovski
- Key people: Emilija Eftimova Gogovska

History
- Launched: 2008, 2026 }}

Links
- Website: www.nasatv.com.mk

Availability

Terrestrial
- Boom TV: Channel 029

Streaming media
- WebMax TV: Watch Live (MKD) Only
- OnNet: Watch Live (MKD) Only

Naša TV (Macedonian: Наша ТВ) is a private national and satellite television channel in North Macedonia. The channel mostly retranslates programs it produces.

This station has broadcast the French Ligue 1 football league.
