= Balkanika TV =

Balkanika TV (Bulgaria)
- Country: Bulgaria

History
- Launched: 15 August 2005

Links
- Website: http://www.balkanika.tv/

Balkanika TV or Balkanika Music Television is a Bulgarian music television, broadcasting popular music and contemporary hits from all Balkan countries. The channel was launched on August 15, 2005, when it started broadcasting in SD format and is part of a group of Fen TV. Since March 2013, the television started HD broadcasting. The channel is part of a media group – Q Music Media Group Ltd., part of Music Media Cluster.

== Programming ==
- Tick Tack - a morning mix featuring nothing but the hottest hits across the Balkans.
- Hit Mix - Perfect selection of the best pop, dance and rock hits from Balkan countries.
- Standard - Supranational music channel Balkanika presents five of the latest hit releases from each Balkan country.
- Music Arena - presenting the best pop, ethno, rock, and dance music created in the last few years in the Balkans.
- 3 in 1 - music TV show presenting 3 of the best videos of one artist from a Balkan country.
- New Video - rubric presenting the newest video clips from all Balkan countries.
- Balkan Party - selects the best Balkan hits for your party.
- Where is the party? - a night mix featuring hits from Balkan artists.
- Balkan Stories - Each show is dedicated to a different popular artist from a Balkan country and includes interview, interesting information and the best videos from the artist.

== Daily schedule ==
Monday

- 1:00am: Where is the party?
- 6:00am: Tick Tack
- 10:00am: Hit Mix
- 2:00pm: Standard Albania
- 2:20pm: Music Arena
- 4:15pm: Hit Mix
- 5:00pm: Standard Montenegro
- 5:20pm: Hit Mix
- 7:00pm: Balkan Party
- 10:00pm: Balkan Stories
- 10:20pm: Balkan Party
- Tuesday
- 1:00am: Where is the party?
- 6:00am: Tick Tack
- 10:00am: Hit Mix
- 2:00pm: Standard Bosnia and Herzegovina
- 2:20pm: Music Arena
- 3:00pm: 3 in 1
- 3:15pm: Hit Mix
- 5:00pm: Standard Bulgaria
- 5:20pm: Hit Mix
- 7:00pm: Balkan Party
- Wednesday
- 1:00am: Where is the party?
- 6:00am: Tick Tack
- 10:00am: Hit Mix
- 2:00pm: Standard Greece
- 2:20pm: Music Arena
- 4:15pm: Hit Mix
- 5:00pm: Standard Croatia
- 5:20pm: Hit Mix
- 7:00pm: Balkan Party
- Thursday
- 1:00am: Where is the party?
- 6:00am: Tick Tack
- 10:00am: Hit Mix
- 2:00pm: Standard Macedonia
- 2:20pm: Music Arena
- 4:15pm: Hit Mix
- 5:00pm: Standard Romania
- 5:20pm: Hit Mix
- 7:00pm: Balkan Party

Friday

- 1:00am: Where is the party?
- 6:00am: Tick Tack
- 10:00am: Hit Mix
- 2:00pm: Standard Slovenia
- 2:20pm: Music Arena
- 4:15pm: Hit Mix
- 5:00pm: Standard Serbia
- 5:20pm: Hit Mix
- 7:00pm: Balkan Party
- Saturday
- 1:00am: Where is the party?
- 6:00am: Tick Tack
- 10:00am: Hit Mix
- 2:00pm: Standard Turkey
- 2:20pm: Hit Mix
- 6:00pm: 3 in 1
- 6:15pm: Hit Mix
- 7:00pm: Balkan Stories
- 7:20pm: Balkan Party
- Sunday
- 1:00am: Where is the party?
- 6:00am: Tick Tack
- 10:00am: Hit Mix
- 11:00am: 3 in 1
- 11:15pm: Music Arena
- 12:00pm: Balkan Stories
- 12:20pm: Music Arena
- 3:00pm: Hit Mix
- 5:00pm: Music Arena
- 7:00pm: Balkan Party

Note: The 'New Video' program has its periodicity daily. However, it can be featured throughout "Hit Mix".

== Former programming ==
- 5 in 1 - weekly music show presenting the best popular artists from Balkan countries with 5 of their best songs.
- Flirt - night music show presenting the best ballads and soft music created in the Balkans.
- A Balkan story with... - a musical documentary show on supranational music channel Balkanika presenting the best artists from the Balkans and the leading music events.
- Balkanika Party - late night music TV show selecting the best ethno and dance music from Balkan countries.
