= Fen TV =

- Country: Bulgaria

Ownership
- Owner: Fen TV Ltd.
- Sister channels: Balkanika Music Television, Fen Folk TV, Folklor TV

History
- Launched: 6 November 2003

Links
- Website: https://www.fentv.bg/

Fen TV (Bulgarian: Фен ТВ) is a Bulgarian music television channel, which launched on 6 November 2003. It is owned by the company "Fen TV" Ltd., which owns Balkanika Music Television. Since the beginning of 2013 broadcast in HD quality.

== Current Programming ==
- The Songs Of…*
- The Morning*
- Premiere*
- The Colours Of Bulgaria*
- Your Music*
- Zone For Greetings*
- No Label*
- Behind The Scene*

== Former Programming ==
- BG Time*
- Hit to Hit*
- Fen TV Club*
- Fen Hit Mix**
