= ELTA 2 =

- Country: Bosnia and Herzegovina
- Broadcast area: Bosnia and Herzegovina
- Headquarters: Tuzla

Programming
- Language(s): Bosnian language
- Picture format: 4:3 576i (SDTV)

Ownership
- Owner: Elta - MT d.o.o. Tuzla
- Key people: Muhamed Tokača (General Director)
- Sister channels: ELTA 1 HD

History
- Launched: 2012.

Links
- Website: www.eltatv.net

Availability

Streaming media
- Online streaming: On website

ELTA 2 is Bosnian specialized cable music channel based in Tuzla. During the day, ELTA 2 broadcasts the best music videos from domestic and foreign artists. The program is mainly produced in the Bosnian language. ELTA 2 is available via cable systems throughout the Bosnia and Herzegovina.
