= MRT 2 (TV channel) =

- Country: North Macedonia
- Broadcast area: North Macedonia
- Headquarters: Skopje, North Macedonia

Programming
- Language: Albanian
- Picture format: 16:9 (576i, SDTV); 16:9 (1080i, HDTV)

Ownership
- Owner: Macedonian Radio-Television
- Sister channels: MRT 1 MRT 1 HD; MRT 3 MRT 4 MRT Sobraniski Kanal; MRT Sat; MRT 2 Sat

History
- Launched: 1978
- Former names: TV Skopje 2 (1978–1991); MTV 2 (1991–2012)

Links
- Website: www.mrt.mk

Availability

Terrestrial
- Digital: Channel 002
- Boom TV: Channel 002 (DVB-T Terrestrial)

Streaming media
- MRT Play: Watch Live (MKD) Only

MRT 2 (Macedonian: МРТ 2, romanized: MRT dva) is a television channel in North Macedonia owned and operated by Macedonian Radio-Television.

== History ==
On March 6, 1978, Televizija Skopje started broadcasting its Second Program. It broadcast once a week, every Monday, and later in the middle of the week, for four hours, in full color. The second program was alternative and complementary to the first, with shows from all genres that are prepared in both sectors for informative-documentary and cultural-artistic shows. The editor-in-chief of the Second Program was Zoran Vangelov. Otherwise, on other days and at the time when it did not broadcast its own content, the second channel broadcast live programs from other Yugoslav television centers.

Since 1994, the channel broadcasts a schedule aiming towards the minority communities of the Republic of North Macedonia. It broadcasts programs in Albanian, Turkish, as well as programs in Serbian, Romani, Aromanian and Bosnian.

From 2020, MRT 2 the channel started broadcasting exclusively in Albanian. All other programs in minority languages moved to a new channel, MRT 4.
