= Televizija 24 =

Macedonian 24-hour news channel

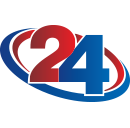
- Country: North Macedonia
- Broadcast area: North Macedonia; Worldwide
- Headquarters: Skopje, North Macedonia

Programming
- Language(s): Macedonian
- Picture format: 16:9 (576i, SDTV)

Ownership
- Owner: Zoran Anastasovski
- Key people: Mladen Chadikovski, Aneta Dodevska, Biljana Arsovska, Seat Rizvanovikj

History
- Launched: 15 December 2010
- Former names: 24 Vesti

Links
- Website: 24.mk

Availability

Terrestrial
- Analog: Channel ?
- Digital: Channel ?
- Boom TV: Channel ?

Streaming media
- WebMax TV: Watch Live (MKD) Only
- OnNet: Watch Live (MKD) Only

Televizija 24 (formerly 24 Vesti) is a 24-hour news channel originating from the national capital of Skopje, North Macedonia, reporting on national, regional and international news.

== Line up ==
The following shows air on 24 Vesti.

- 24 Analysis
- 24 From Heart
- 24 News
- 24 Reportage
- About Life
- Culture Matrix
- Evrozum
- Eyes on Eyes
- Factor Health
- Road to success
- Second Opinion
- Third Gate
- Third Half
- Trend
- Work Saturday
