= Alfa TV (North Macedonia) =

Television channel and company

Alfa TV Алфа ТВ
- Logo of Alfa TV
- Country: North Macedonia
- Broadcast area: North Macedonia
- Headquarters: Skopje

Programming
- Language: Macedonian
- Picture format: 16:9 (576i, SDTV); 16:9 (1080i, HDTV)

Ownership
- Owner: Peter Schatz
- Key people: Jani Bojadži

History
- Launched: 1998
- Former names: TV Skopje

Links
- Website: www.alfa.mk

Availability

Terrestrial
- Analog: Channel 18
- Digital: Channel 28
- Boom TV: Channel 007

Streaming media
- WebMax TV: Watch Live (MKD) Only
- OnNet: Watch Live (MKD) Only

Alfa TV (Macedonian: Алфа ТВ) is a privately owned TV station and broadcaster in North Macedonia. Its headquarters are in Skopje.

Alfa TV supports VMRO-DPMNE and it is majority-owned by Peter Schatz, a Hungarian media tycoon closely allied with former Hungarian Prime Minister Viktor Orbán. It has received criticism for factual inaccuracies in its reporting.

== History ==
It was established as a local channel in 1998, named as TV Skopje, by businessman Ljupčo Palevski. In January 2001, it was bought by Greek businessman Dimitris Kontominas and the channel changed its name to Alfa. The Serbian media group, Pink, attempted to acquire Alfa TV, in 2010. Alfa TV was pro-opposition in its stances. From 2008 to 2012, Alfa TV was owned by businessman Šterjo Nakov. Veselin Jevrosimović became the majority owner in 2012.

On 23 May 2013, Alfa TV received a license from the Broadcasting Counci to broadcast content at the national level. In this period, it became a supporter of VMRO-DPMNE and Nikola Gruevski. It was among the main recipients of money from the VMRO-DPMNE government between 2010 and 2017, receiving €6.3 million. On 24 March 2017, the conference organized by the Institute for Communication Studies (IKS), based on monitoring of television news coverage made from September to February 2017, classified Alfa TV as a propagandistic outlet, as favorable towards VMRO-DPMNE and negative towards the Social Democratic Union of Macedonia (SDSM). Hungarian businessman and Viktor Orbán's ally Peter Schatz acquired Alfa TV in July 2017 as part of a media takeover in Macedonia (now North Macedonia), becoming its majority owner. It posted advertisements for small Hungarian firms. Jani Bojadži became the director of the company in 2019.

Alfa TV's reports have been criticized for factual inaccuracies. It received criticism from the civic fact-checking organization F2N2 for promoting misinformation concerning foreign investment and Russian influence in the country. In May 2018, North Macedonia's Council of Media Ethics determined that Alfa TV's reports about Russian influence and sexism in the army of North Macedonia had violated the council's code of conduct. In March 2019, fact-checkers criticized Alfa TV for misreporting a survey of German businesses operating in the country. According to a study about COVID-19 related disinformation in North Macedonia by Metamorphosis Foundation, Alfa TV's content was used to promote false claims about the pandemic in the Balkans in 2020. Тhe Critical Thinking for Mediawise Citizens – Crithink project reported that Alfa TV promoted a lack of trust in governmental anti-pandemic measures, including the contract tracing mobile application StopKorona! with a late night talk show. Reports by CIVIL media monitoring and the European Parliament (such as the 2021 report "Mapping Fake News an Disinformation in the Western Balkans and Identifying Ways to Effectively Counter Them") have found that Alfa TV often publishes politically biased disinformation, including slander and insults against organizations for human rights and its members, and journalists. Per the European Parliament report, it engaged in disinformation campaigns to discredit the government of SDSM and the Prespa Agreement with Greece.

Per the 2021 annual report by the Agency for Audio and Audiovisual Media Services, it was the fifth most-watched television station in the country. In February 2021, Alfa TV appeared on the list of companies which received aid from the government during the COVID-19 pandemic in North Macedonia but failed to pay salaries to employees. In August, the employees of the company held a partial strike due to the unpaid salaries.
