= Telma (TV channel) =

Television channel in North Macedonia

Тelma Телма
- Country: North Macedonia
- Broadcast area: North Macedonia
- Headquarters: Skopje, North Macedonia

Programming
- Language: Macedonian
- Picture format: 1080i HDTV (downscaled to 576i for the SDTV feed)

Ownership
- Owner: Makpetrol A.D. - Skopje

History
- Launched: September 1996

Links
- Website: www.telma.com.mk

Availability

Terrestrial
- Digital: MUX 6

Streaming media
- A1 WebTV: Watch Live (MKD) Only

Telma (Macedonian: Телма) is a private television channel in North Macedonia.

== Programmes ==
Telma was founded in September 1996. The current number of employees is approximately 150 (managing and editorial board, journalists, reporters, announcers, technical staff, marketing and administration) and there are also a large number of correspondents and external cooperators. One of the best things on this channel is the News broadcasting every day at 15:00, 18:30 and 21:40h (GMT +1). Also the Italian Serie A is traditional broadcasting on TV Telma. Telma is one of the most viewed TV channels in North Macedonia.

This Television has been broadcaster for Italian League Serie A.

The word "Telma" is an abbreviation of Television Makpetrol.

== Line up ==
=== Telma Shows ===
- News (Macedonian: Вести)
- Music (Macedonian: Музика)
- That is Me (Macedonian: Тоа сум јас)
- Filmopolis (Macedonian: Филмополис)
- Cultural Chronic (Macedonian: Културна хроника)
- Everyone is VIP (Macedonian: Секој е ВИП)
- Auto-magazin (Macedonian: Авто-магазин)
- Food and Wine - show for gourmands (Macedonian: Храна и вино - емисија за гурмани)
- Kotoledonija (Macedonian: Котиледонија)
- Sixth Day (Macedonian: Шестиот ден - контактно-забавен магазин)
- Optional (Macedonian: Незадолжително)
- Makplanet (Macedonian: Макпланет)
- Go home (Macedonian: Ајде дома)
- KOD with Snežana Lupeska (Macedonian: КОД со Снежана Лупеска)

=== Foreign TV Shows ===
- Dexter (Macedonian: Декстер)
- Battlestar Galactica (Macedonian: Бетлстар Галактика)
- Bandolera (Macedonian: Бандолера)
- Monty Python's Flying Circus (Macedonian: Летачкиот циркус на Монти Пајтон)
- Gran Hotel (Macedonian: Гранд Хотел)
- Legends of Chima (Macedonian: Легендата за Чима)
- House (Macedonian: Др. Хаус)
- La impostora (Macedonian: Измамничка)
- Borgen (Macedonian: Премиерка)
- The Ellen DeGeneres Show (Macedonian: Eлен шоу )
