= Valentino Music =

- Country: Bosnia and Herzegovina
- Headquarters: Brčko

Programming
- Language: Bosnian language
- Picture format: 4:3 576i SDTV

Ownership
- Owner: "DENI-COMPANI" d.o.o. za unutrašnju i vanjsku trgovinu i zastupanje, Brčko Distrikt BiH
- Key people: Dragan Veselčić
- Sister channels: OTV Valentino; Obiteljska televizija Valentino; Valentino Etno; Valentino Folk

Links
- Website: www.valentinobh.com

Valentino Music is a Bosnian commercial cable television channel based in Brčko, Bosnia and Herzegovina. This television channel broadcasts Turbo-folk music and music shows. The program is mainly produced in the Bosnian language, and it is available via cable systems throughout Bosnia and Herzegovina.
