= MRT 1 =

- The logo of MRT 1 adopted in 2012.
- Country: North Macedonia
- Broadcast area: North Macedonia
- Headquarters: Skopje, North Macedonia

Programming
- Language: Macedonian
- Picture format: 16:9 (576i, SDTV); 16:9 (1080i, HDTV)

Ownership
- Owner: Macedonian Radio-Television
- Sister channels: MRT 1 HD; MRT 2 MRT 3 MRT 4 MRT Sobraniski Kanal; MRT Sat; MRT 2 Sat

History
- Launched: 1964; 62 years ago
- Former names: TV Skopje (1964–1978); TVS 1 (1978–1991); MTV 1 (1991–2012)

Links
- Website: www.mrt.mk

Availability

Terrestrial
- Digital: Channel 001
- Boom TV: Channel 001

Streaming media
- MRT Play: Watch Live (MKD) Only
- WebMax TV: Watch Live (MKD) Only
- OnNet: Watch Live (MKD) Only

MRT Old logo

MRT 1 (Macedonian: МРТ 1, romanized: MRT eden), is a television station in North Macedonia owned and operated by Macedonian Radio-Television.

== Current line-up ==
=== News shows ===
- Dnevnik MRT - main news at 11:00, 17:00, and 22:45
- MRT Vesti - news, runs at 13:00
- Централниот Дневник на Македонската Радио Телевизија - News at 19:30 to 20:30

=== MRT Production ===
- Macedonia through antiquity
- Macedonia through history
- Macedonia under Ottoman rule
- 20 years old Macedonian independence
- A century exile
- Makedonski narodni prikazni (Македонски народни приказни)
- Skopje continues
- Witnesses
- IMRO
- Ohrid Archbishopric

=== Entertainment ===
- Trotoar (Тротоар)
- The Ren & Stimpy Show (Рен и Стимби шоу)
- Stisni play (Стисни плеj)
- Iselenički džuboks (Иселенички Џубокс)
- SpongeBob SquarePants (Сунѓерот Боб Панталоновски) (2014)
- Sonic the hedgehog (Eжот соник) (season 1 and 2)
- Prespav (Преспав)
- Adventures of Sonic the Hedgehog (Авантурите на Eжот соник)
- The Penguins of Madagascar (Пингвините од Мадагаскар)
- Little Amadeus (Малиот Амадеус)
- Avatar: The Last Airbender (Аватар) (2014-2015)
- Dora the Explorer (Дора истражува) (2012-2020)
- The Simpsons (Симпсонови)
- Fireman Sam (Пожарникарот Сем)

=== European soap operas ===
- Hispania, la leyenda (Легендата на Хиспанија)

=== Foreign Series ===
- The Big Bang Theory - in Macedonian "Бубалици"
- Fringe - in Macedonian "На работ"
- Gossip Girl - in Macedonian "Озборувачка"
- CSI Las Vegas - in Macedonian "Истрага на местото на злосторството"
- CSI: Miami - in Macedonian "Истрага на местото на злосторството: Маjами"
- CSI: New York - in Macedonian "Истрага на местото на злосторството: Њуjорк"

=== Political/talk shows ===
- Ako e...so Čom (Ако е...со Чом)
- Od naš agol (Од наш агол)
- Broker (Брокер)
- Evromagazin (Евромагазин)
- Da bideme načisto (Да бидеме начисто)
- Agrar (Аграр)
- Piramida (Пирамида)

=== Documentary ===
- Talkači (Талкачи)
- Apokalipsa (Апокалипса)

=== Educational ===
- Dzvon (Ѕвон)
- Word on the street - we learn English
- Third era
- Time for a baby
- World of silence
- From school to a carrier
- ТV-Class (ТВ-Училница)

=== Reality ===
- Toa Sum Jas

== MRT 1 HD ==
MRT 1 HD is a HD simulcast of MRT 1, launched on 23rd September 2012?.
