= ELTA 1 HD =

Bosnian commercial television channel

- Country: Bosnia and Herzegovina
- Broadcast area: Bosnia and Herzegovina
- Headquarters: Banja Luka

Programming
- Language: Serbian language
- Picture format: 16:9 HDTV 1080i

Ownership
- Owner: "STIJENA HERC" d.o.o. Ljubinje
- Key people: Slavomir Ćuk (General Director)
- Sister channels: ELTA 2

History
- Launched: 2010
- Former names: ELTA TV

Links
- Website: www.eltatv.net

Availability

Streaming media
- Online streaming: On website

ELTA 1 HD or ELTA TV is a Bosnian commercial television channel based in Banja Luka. ELTA TV has started broadcasting their own experimental program on 12 May 2010 under the name "Elta televizija". On the first anniversary of broadcasting (2011) the program is broadcast in High definition 24 hours a day in the Serbian language. ELTA 1 HD is available via cable systems throughout the Bosnia and Herzegovina.

== ELTA 1 HD Line-up ==
This television channel broadcasts a variety of programs such as entertainment and mosaic magazines, movies (full HD) and documentaries.

- FLAME - show bizz-entertainment magazine
- COVER magazin - entertainment magazine
- AQUANA TV - entertainment magazine
- Kafa u 5 - TV show on current issues and events in the RS entity and BiH.
- Trenutak za kulturni kutak - overview of cultural events in Banja Luka and the region.
- Pod istragom - (Under investigation) - news magazine with various topics

=== Foreign series ===
Serbian language (Iyekavian) translation	Original name
Majstori horora	Masters of Horror (full HD)
Čistač	The Cleaner
Kenedijevi	The Kennedys (full HD)
Kompanija	The Company (full HD)
Žene fudbalera	The Game
Nijemi svjedok	Silent Witness
Stjuardese	Mile High
Crni Gruja	Црни Груја
