= MRT Assembly Channel =

MRT Sobraniski Kanal МРТ Собраниски канал
- Country: North Macedonia
- Broadcast area: North Macedonia
- Headquarters: Skopje, North Macedonia

Programming
- Language: Macedonian
- Picture format: 16:9 (576i, SDTV); 16:9 (1080i, HDTV)

Ownership
- Owner: Macedonian Radio-Television
- Sister channels: MRT 1 MRT 1 HD; MRT 2 MRT 3 MRT 4 MRT Sat; MRT 2 Sat

History
- Launched: 1991
- Former names: TV Skopje 3 (1991); MTV 3 (1991–2012)

Links
- Website: www.mrt.com.mk

Availability

Terrestrial
- Digital (Boom TV): Channel 003
- Max TV (IPTV): Channel 003

Streaming media
- MRT Play: Watch Live (MKD) & (Worldwide)

MRT Assembly Channel is a television channel in North Macedonia owned and operated by Macedonian Radio-Television. The channel was formed in 1991 as an experimental channel, but now it broadcasts the activities from the Assembly of the Republic of North Macedonia.
