= MRT Sat =

- Country: North Macedonia
- Headquarters: Skopje, North Macedonia

Programming
- Language: Macedonian
- Picture format: 16:9 (576i, SDTV); 16:9 (1080i, HDTV)

Ownership
- Sister channels: MRT 1 MRT 1 HD; MRT 2 MRT Sobraniski kanal MRT 2 Sat

History
- Launched: April 30, 2000
- Former names: MKTV Sat (2000–2012)

Availability

Streaming media
- MRT Play: Watch now (MKD) & (Worldwide)

MRT Sat (MKTV Sat) is the name of Macedonian Radio-Television's satellite service to telecast to the Macedonian diaspora across the world. Its programming is taken from MRT 1. MRT Sat is available in Australia and New Zealand. It is currently broadcast through UBI World TV and TotalTV.

MRT Sat was launched on 30 April 2000 and broadcasts a continuous 24-hour programme for Europe, North Africa, East Asia, Americas, etc. which is a selection of MRT programmes, as well as an original programme. It was meant to be intended for all Macedonians living outside North Macedonia.
