= Macedonian Radio Television =

Public broadcasting organisation of North Macedonia

Coordinates: 42°0′0″N 21°27′0″E

Macedonian Radio and television Македонска радио-телевизија

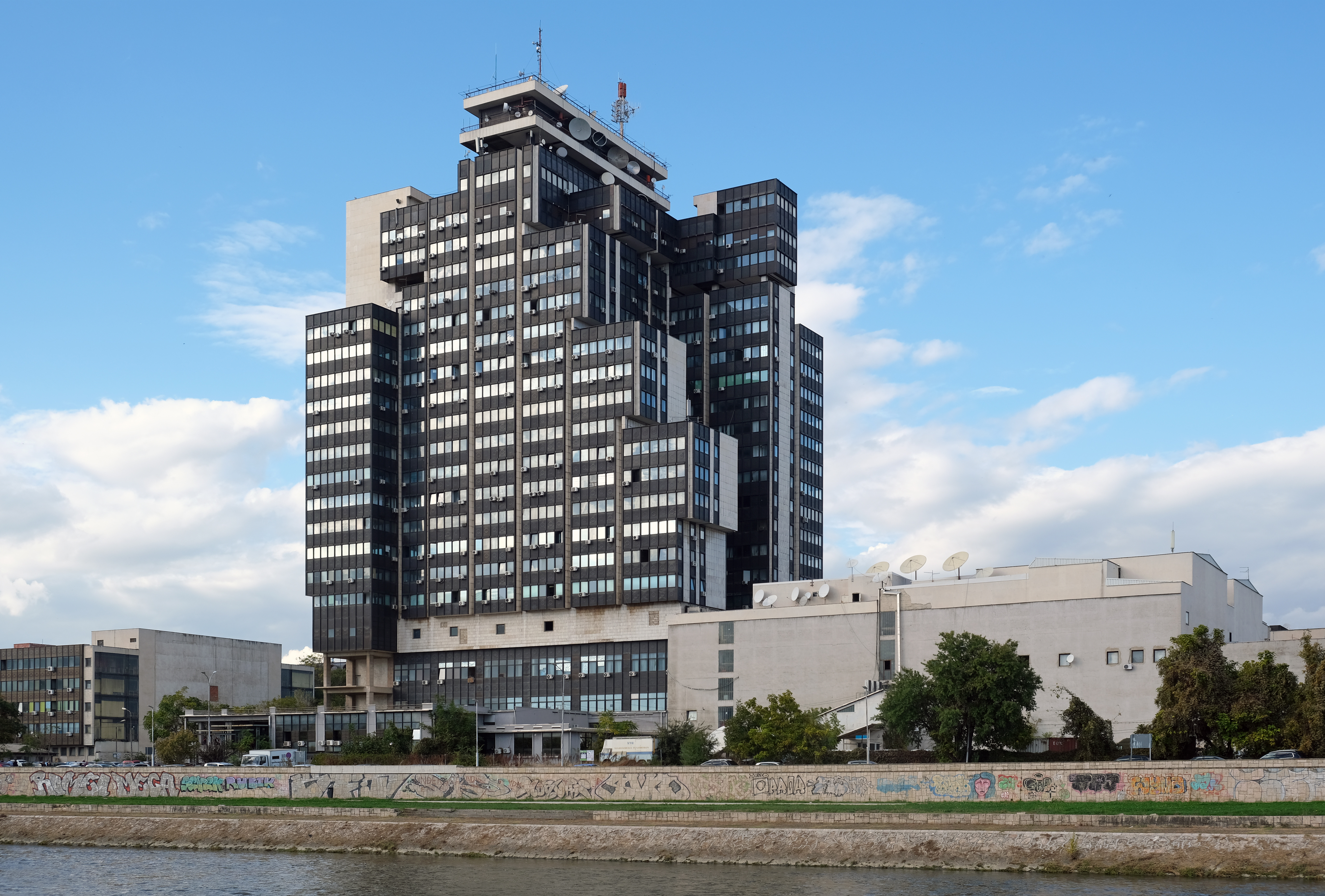
- MRT Center, the headquarters of MRT in Skopje
- Type: Broadcast national television network
- Country: North Macedonia
- Availability: National; international (via MRT Sat and Radio Macedonia)
- Founded: 28 December 1944; 81 years ago by ASNOM
- Owner: Macedonian government
- Launch date: 28 December 1944; 81 years ago
- Callsigns: MKRTV
- Former affiliations: Yugoslav Radio Television (JRT) (1945–1991)
- Official website: https://mrt.com.mk/

Macedonian Radio Television (Macedonian: Македонска радио-телевизија, romanized: Makedonska radio-televizija), or MRT (МРТ) for short, is the public broadcasting organisation of North Macedonia. It was founded in 1993 by the Macedonian Assembly.

Its legally defined service is the production and broadcasting of radio and television programmes of all genres, which should satisfy the public information, cultural, educational and recreational needs of the people of North Macedonia.

MRT is directed by Marijan Cvetkovski. MRT has 1,200 employees.

== History ==
Radio in Vardar Macedonia began in 1941, when Skopje was administrative capital of Vardar Banovina in Kingdom of Yugoslavia. On 27 January 1941 Radio Skoplje (Радио Скопље) started broadcasting in Serbian and retransmitting some programs from Radio Belgrade. On 20 April 1941 Radio Skopje was relaunched under Bulgarian control as Radio Skopie (Радио Скопие), retransmitting some programs from Radio Sofia.

Broadcasting in Macedonian began on 28 December 1944 as Radio Skopje (Радио Скопје) with the live transmission of the Second Session of ASNOM. TV Skopje started operation in 1964. In 1978 its first programme was renamed TVS 1.

MRT's second and previous logo from 1991 to 2012

Since 1991 Macedonian Radio and Television is an independent radio and television broadcaster. During 1993, MRT was admitted as a full active member of the European Broadcasting Union. MRT uses the acronym: MKRTV. With the enactment of the new broadcasting law on 24 April 1997, Macedonian Radio and Television was split into two parts: Macedonian radio-diffusion and Macedonian Radio-Television. According to article 77 of the broadcasting law, 61% of the collected broadcasting tax belongs to Macedonian Radio-television. The broadcasting tax was abolished in September 2017.

In March 2019, the government of North Macedonia recommended to the Board of the MRT to change the name of the network to "National Radiotelevision" in light of the Prespa agreement. Even though such changes were not made, some government officials have since used the abbreviation NRTV when referring to the network.

== Services ==
=== Television ===
Macedonian Television broadcasts 73 hours of programmes daily on its three national terrestrial and two international satellite channels.

Terrestrial

- MRT 1 broadcasts a generalist programming.
- MRT 2 is centred towards the Albanian community of North Macedonia.
- MRT 3 broadcasts sports and entertainment.
- MRT 4 caters to the different national minorities in the country, such as the Turkish, Serbian, Romani, Aromanian and Bosnian communities.
- MRT 5 is focused towards children.
- MRT Sobraniski Kanal was formed in 1991 as an experimental channel, but now it broadcasts the activities from the Assembly of the Republic of North Macedonia.

All terrestrial channels air natively in high-definition.

Satellite

- MRT Sat started in 2000 and broadcasts a continuous 24-hour programme, which are a selection of programmes from MRT, as well as special programming produced for the channel of 5 hours.
- MRT 2 Sat was introduced in 2012 and broadcasts a continuous 24-hour programme in Albanian.

=== Radio ===
The framework of the Macedonian Radio consists of three national channels, a satellite channel and a non-profit regional channel. It broadcasts 86.5 hours of programmes daily on its national and satellite channels. Macedonian Radio also broadcasts its programme over the Internet.

- The First channel, Radio Skopje, broadcasts a continuous 24-hour programme. It mainly functions as a talk radio.
- The Second channel, Radio 2, broadcasts a continuous 24-hour programme, too. It is focused on popular music and entertainment.
- The Third channel of Radio Skopje, broadcasts programmes in all the languages of the national minorities in North Macedonia, including Albanian (since 1948); Turkish (since 1945) 5 hours; Aromanian (since 1991); Romani (since 1991); Serbian (since 2003) and Bosnian (since 2003) all 30 minutes each per day.
- The satellite channel, Radio Macedonia, commenced in July 2003, and broadcasts a 24-hour continual programme, which is a selection of programmes from Macedonian Radio and its original programme "Radio Macedonia" with a duration of 6 hours and 30 minutes.
- Kanal 103 provides FM broadcasting only for the region of Skopje with the mission of promoting avant-garde music and culture.
Radio station logos since 2012

Radio Skopje (MR 1)

Radio 2 (MR 2)

Radio 3 (MR 3)

Radio Macedonia (MR SAT)

== Management ==
The process of transformation of MRTV in a public service broadcaster is not yet completed; it entailed the 1997 Law on Broadcasting Activities and the 2005 Broadcast Law. Editorial independence of MRTV is guaranteed by law but de facto lacking due to lack of independent funding and lack of independence of MRTV managerial bodies. MRTV executive directors in the last ten years remained close to the party in power. The network was funded by a license fee as well as by public budget contributions and advertising revenues (limited to 10% of airtime). Budgetary needs, and the practice of ad hoc state budgetary funding, has created a "culture of dependence" in MRTV.

MRTV is supervised by the MRTV Council, whose members are appointed by the Parliament upon proposal by "authorised nominators" from civil society. The Council then elects the members of MRTV Management Board. Although formally only accountable to the legislature through its annual report and budget plan, MRTV remains informally accountable to the executive, undermining institutional autonomy. MRTV also risks neglecting cultural pluralism obligations, in terms of programmes for minorities, as well as lacking impartiality and distance from government/majority politicians.

== Notable people ==
Notable people who were employed in the Macedonian Radio-television include clarinetist and composer Tale Ognenovski who was a member of the “Chalgii orchestra”, “Folk music orchestra” and “Authentic folk instruments orchestra” from 1960 until 1979.

== See also ==
- MRT Center
