= V Sport =

Brand of sports channels in the Nordic countries

V Sports
- Country: Nordic
- Broadcast area: Sweden, Denmark, Norway and Finland

Ownership
- Owner: Viaplay Group
- Sister channels: V Classics; V Crime; V Film; V Series

History
- Launched: June 2020
- Replaced: Viasat Sport; Viasport (Norway only)

Links
- Website: http://www.tv1000.se/

V Sport is the common brand of several sports channels targeting the Nordic countries, owned by Viaplay Group. The brand has been introduced in June 2020, replacing the former brands Viasat Sport and Viasport (Norway only). Its main competitors are TV 2 Sport (Denmark), MTV Urheilu (Finland), TV 2 Sport (Norway), TV4 Sport (Sweden) and Eurosport.

== ESportTV ==
ESportTV
- Country: Nordic
- Broadcast area: Sweden, Denmark, Norway and Finland

Ownership
- Owner: V Sport

History
- Launched: June 2020

Links
- Website: http://www.esporttv.se/

ESportTV is a Swedish television channel by V Sport.

== Sports rights ==
=== Association football ===
National leagues

- Eredivisie (Dutch first division)
- Ligue 1 (French first division)
- Premier League (English first division)
- SAS Ligaen (Danish first division)
- Bundesliga (German first division)
- A-League Men (Australian first division)

National cups

- Football League Cup (English league cup)
- FA Cup (English cup)

European competitions

- UEFA Champions League
- UEFA Europa League

=== Other sports ===
American football

- National Football League (NFL)

Basketball

- EuroLeague
- EuroCup

Golf

- PGA Tour

Ice hockey

- HockeyAllsvenskan (Swedish second division)
- Ice Hockey World Championships
- Eliteserien/Fjordkraftligaen (Norwegian first division)
- World Cup of Hockey
- Kontinental Hockey League (KHL)
- National Hockey League (NHL)

Motorsports

- Formula One
- IndyCar
- MotoGP
- NASCAR
- DTM

== Channels ==
Viasat Sport was launched as a pan-Nordic channel in 1999. In January 2002, a dedicated Danish channel, Viasat Sport Denmark, launched and replaced the pan-Nordic version in Denmark.

1 February 2004, Viasat launched two new sport channels; Viasat Sport 2 and Viasat Sport 3. The two existing channels were re-branded as Viasat Sport 1. During the autumn the two new channels were refocused, turning Viasat Sport 2 into a dedicated soccer channel and Viasat Sport 3 becoming a channel for motor and contact sports.

In April 2005, a "news channel" called Viasat Sport 24 was launched.

In the end of 2005, Viasat Sport 1 in Norway was replaced by SportN, a joint venture with government-owned public broadcaster NRK .

In January 2007, a dedicated golf channel, Viasat Golf, was launched replacing Viasat Sport 24.

11 April 2007, Viasat Sport 1 in Denmark was replaced by TV 2 Sport, a joint venture with state-owned broadcaster TV 2.

In early 2008, Viasat launched their first high-definition sports channels: TV 2 Sport HD for Denmark and Viasat Sport HD för Norway and Sweden.

On October 17, 2008, the Viasat Sport channels went through a major overhaul which saw Viasat Sport 2 and 3 disappear in Sweden and Norway. They were replaced by Viasat Fotboll (in Sweden), Viasat Sport (in Norge) and Viasat Motor (both countries). The Swedish Viasat Sport 1 was renamed Viasat Sport. Viasat Sport HD continued to be available in both Norway and Sweden, and Viasat Golf was still available in all four Scandinavian countries.

Viasat Sport 2 and 3 continued in Denmark, Finland and the Baltics until January 6, 2009. On January 7, 2009, Viasat Sport Baltic channel was launched in Baltic states. Viasat Golf also became available in the region. Finland and Denmark didn't receive any replacements for Viasat Sport 2 and 3.

The Baltic business was sold in 2017 to Providence Equity Partners, and Viasat Sport Baltic has been renamed to TVPlay Sports (currently TV3 Sport). In 2018 the Nordic TV business of Modern Times Group was split off into Nordic Entertainment Group (NENT).

=== Denmark ===
Channel lineup:

- TV3 Sport
- TV3+
- TV3 MAX
- V Sport Golf
- V Sport Live
- V Sport Ultra HD

=== Finland ===
Channel lineup:

- V Sport 1 Suomi
- V Sport 2 Suomi
- V Sport + Suomi
- V Sport 1
- V Sport Football
- V Sport Golf
- V Sport Vinter
- V Sport Premium
- V Sport Live
- V Sport Ultra HD

=== Norway ===
New channel lineup as of 15 September 2008:

- V Sport +
- V Sport 1
- V Sport 2
- V Sport 3
- V Sport Golf
- V Sport Premier League 1
- V Sport Premier League 2
- V Sport Premier League 3
- V Sport Premier League 4
- V Sport Live
- V Sport Ultra HD

=== Sweden ===
New channel lineup as of 16 September 2009:

- V Sport Football
- V Sport Golf
- V Sport Motor
- V Sport Vinter
- V Sport 1
- V Sport Premium
- V Sport Extra
- V Sport Live
- V Sport Ultra HD
