= Super Bowl XLIII =

2009 National Football League championship game

Pittsburgh Steelers (2) (AFC) (12–4)	Arizona Cardinals (4) (NFC) (9–7)
27	23
Head coach: Mike Tomlin	Head coach: Ken Whisenhunt
	1	2	3	4	Total
PIT	3	14	3	7	27
ARI	0	7	0	16	23
- Date: February 1, 2009
- Stadium: Raymond James Stadium; Tampa, Florida
- MVP: Santonio Holmes, wide receiver
- Favorite: Steelers by 7
- Referee: Terry McAulay
- Attendance: 70,774

Ceremonies
- National anthem: Jennifer Hudson
- Coin toss: Gen. David Petraeus
- Halftime show: Bruce Springsteen and the E Street Band

TV in the United States
- Network: NBC
- Announcers: Al Michaels, John Madden, Andrea Kremer, and Alex Flanagan
- Nielsen ratings: 42.0 (national); 53.6 (Pittsburgh); 47.5 (Phoenix); US viewership: 98.7 million est. avg., 151.6 million est. total
- Market share: 65 (national); 79 (Pittsburgh); 80 (Arizona)
- Cost of 30-second commercial: $3 million

Radio in the United States
- Network: Westwood One
- Announcers: Marv Albert, Boomer Esiason, John Dockery, and Mark Malone

Super Bowl XLIII was an American football game between the American Football Conference (AFC) champions Pittsburgh Steelers and the National Football Conference (NFC) champions Arizona Cardinals to decide the National Football League (NFL) champion for the 2008 season. The Steelers defeated the Cardinals by the score of 27–23. The game was played on February 1, 2009, at Raymond James Stadium in Tampa, Florida.

With this victory, the Steelers became the first team to win six Super Bowl championships. The win was also the Steelers' second Super Bowl victory in four years, after winning Super Bowl XL at the end of the 2005 season. The Cardinals entered the game seeking their first NFL title since 1947, the longest championship drought in the league. The club became an unexpected winner during the regular season, compiling a 9–7 record, and earning a spot in the playoffs with the aid of head coach Ken Whisenhunt, who was the Steelers' offensive coordinator in Super Bowl XL, and the re-emergence of quarterback Kurt Warner, who was the Super Bowl MVP in Super Bowl XXXIV with his former team, the St. Louis Rams.

The Steelers jumped to a 17–7 halftime lead, aided by linebacker James Harrison's Super Bowl–record 100-yard interception return for a touchdown. Trailing 20–7 at the start of the fourth quarter, the Cardinals scored 16 consecutive points, including a safety that led to wide receiver Larry Fitzgerald's 64-yard touchdown reception, to take their first lead of the game with 2:37 remaining. But the Steelers marched 78 yards to score on wide receiver Santonio Holmes's 6-yard game-winning touchdown catch with 35 seconds left. Holmes, who caught nine passes for 131 yards and a touchdown, including four receptions for 73 yards on that final game-winning drive, was named Super Bowl MVP. He became the sixth wide receiver to win the award, half of whom at the time were Steelers players (Lynn Swann and Hines Ward).

The NBC television network broadcast attracted an average U.S. audience of 98.7 million viewers, making it the most watched Super Bowl in history at that time and the most watched Super Bowl of the 2000s. Many media outlets consider this one of the best Super Bowls from the 2000s, as well as one of the greatest Super Bowls of all time, due to the performance of both teams as well as its thrilling finale. This game was ranked No. 4 on NFL Top 10 on NFL Network for Top 10 Greatest Games of All Time and ranked No. 1 for Top 10 Super Bowls. As of 2025, this is the Steelers' most recent Super Bowl championship, and the last title by a Pennsylvania-based NFL team until their cross-state rival Philadelphia Eagles won Super Bowl LII in 2018. It was also the last time a Phoenix-based team reached the championship round of the four major North American sports leagues until the Phoenix Suns made the NBA Finals in 2021.

This was the last game to feature famed commentator John Madden, who retired two months after the game.

== Background ==
=== Host selection process ===
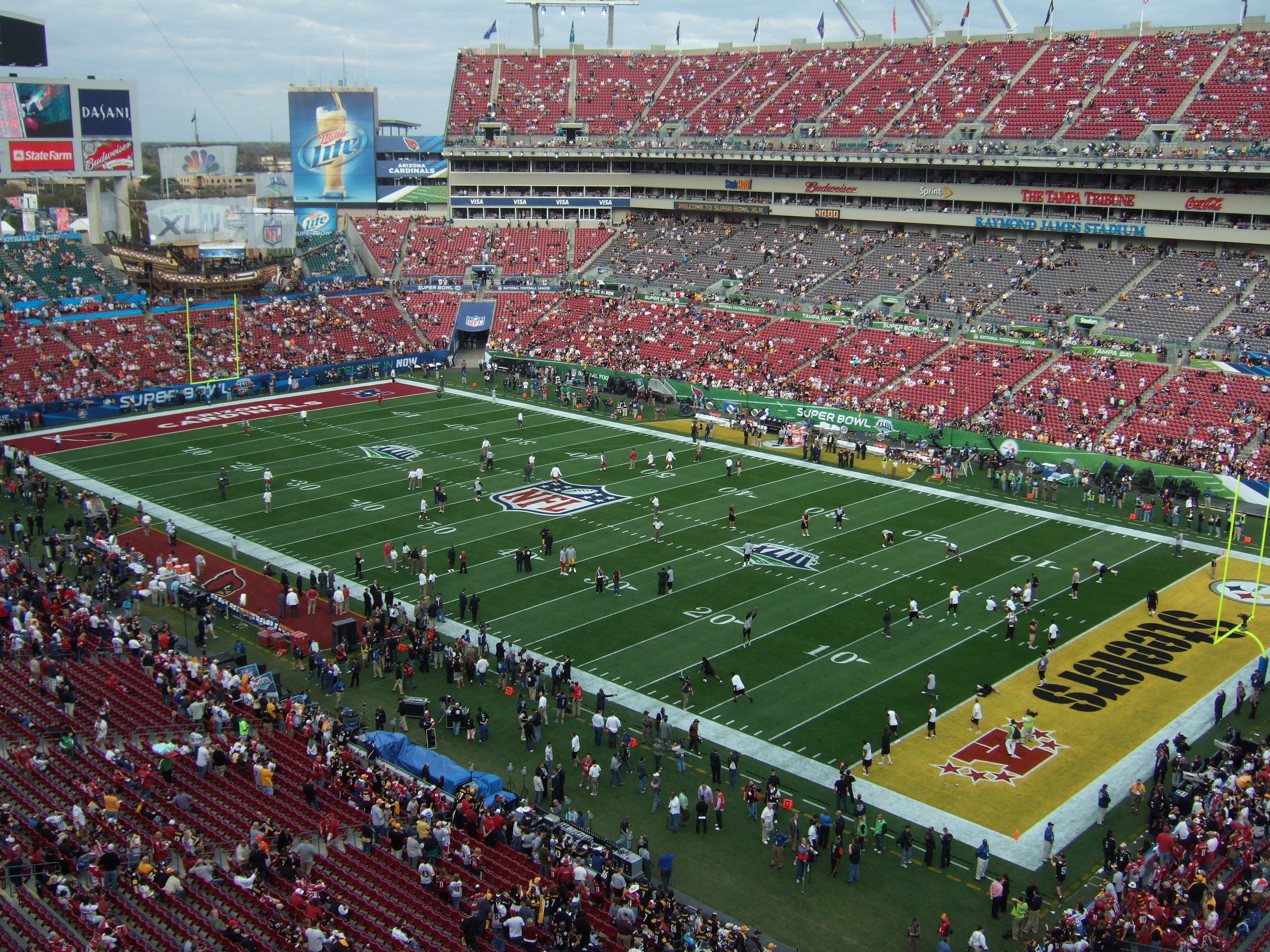
Raymond James Stadium with Super Bowl XLIII decorations and colored lights.

NFL owners voted to award Super Bowl XLIII to Tampa during their May 25, 2005 meeting held in Washington, D.C. Four cities were part of the bid process: Tampa (Raymond James Stadium), Atlanta (Georgia Dome), Houston (Reliant Stadium), and Miami (Dolphins Stadium). All four cities had previously hosted multiple Super Bowls. New York/New Jersey (Giants Stadium) was also an early candidate to host, a plan that had the support of NFL commissioner Paul Tagliabue. NY/NJ had been a candidate for XLII, but decided to withdraw from that game and try for XLIII. Approximately $250–300 million was needed for upgrades and renovations to aging Giants Stadium. Ultimately the plans failed to materialize, and NY/NJ dropped out. At the same time, a separate group led by the Jets embarked on an alternate NY/NJ bid for West Side Stadium for XLIV.

The Atlanta host committee, led by Falcons owner Arthur Blank, made an aggressive bid for XLIII. Of the four finalists, Atlanta had the longest gap since last hosting (XXXIV). They promised $150 million in renovations to the Georgia Dome, and boasted their proximity to major attractions, practice facilities, as well as the ease of travel with Hartsfield–Jackson Atlanta International Airport. Atlanta, however, was not without its detractors. The major ice storm that occurred during the days leading up to XXXIV, as well as Atlanta's reputation for traffic congestion were factors.

Miami was thought to be a long shot, as it was already scheduled to host XLI. Tampa promised warm weather, golfing opportunities, and a private league party at Busch Gardens. Meanwhile, Houston had the newest stadium of the four. The selection for XLIII was considered by some as particularly consequential, because with new stadiums planned in Dallas, Indianapolis, and potentially Los Angeles – and with XLIV tentatively assigned to West Side Stadium in Manhattan – it might be several years until another Super Bowl host opportunity would be available.

The vote was scheduled for a maximum of four rounds. A city receiving 3/4 of the votes would win outright. If no city received the necessary votes (24 of 32) during the first round, the last place vote-getter would be eliminated, and the process repeated. If the fourth round was reached, the vote would change to a simple majority (17 of 32). Houston was eliminated on the first ballot, and Miami was eliminated on the second. Neither Tampa nor Atlanta received enough votes in the third round, so the fourth round was decided by simple majority. Tampa won the vote, in what was described as a 'narrow' vote and an "upset".

It would be the second Super Bowl at Raymond James Stadium, and the fourth overall in Tampa. After losing out, the city of Atlanta would not land the Super Bowl again for another ten years (LIII). In February 2008, the Tampa Bay Super Bowl Host Committee unveiled the Super Bowl XLIII logo, featuring an abstract representation of a football stadium, with blue and green colors representing the regional waterways and landscapes of Tampa Bay. Eight yards of playing field are shown, alluding to the game's status as the championship of the 2008 NFL season. In a tradition starting with the XL logo, two stars—one red, representing the AFC, and one blue, representing the NFC—are flanked on either side of the XLIII logo. The tagline for Super Bowl XLIII as well as the 2008 NFL season is "Believe In Now".

=== Teams ===
The seeds of Super Bowl XLIII can be traced back to the end of the 2006 season. After winning Super Bowl XL in 2005, the Pittsburgh Steelers fell to an 8–8 record the following year. At the end of 2006, Bill Cowher ended his 15-year tenure as their head coach, leaving with a 149–90–1 regular season record and a 12–9 record in the playoffs. Offensive coordinator Ken Whisenhunt and assistant head coach Russ Grimm were considered most likely to succeed Cowher in Pittsburgh.

Without waiting to see if he would be hired by the Steelers, Whisenhunt accepted the head coaching job with the Arizona Cardinals, a team that at the time held the second-longest championship drought in U.S. sports (1947, with only the Chicago Cubs having a longer drought, winning their last championship in 1908) and had never advanced to the Super Bowl in their franchise history. In the 60 years since their last national championship, the team had won just one playoff game (20–7 over the Dallas Cowboys in the 1998 NFC Wild Card Game). The Steelers then passed over Grimm and instead hired Minnesota Vikings defensive coordinator Mike Tomlin. Once Tomlin was hired by the Steelers, Grimm joined Whisenhunt with the Cardinals in the same position as assistant head coach as he had with the Steelers, and the two of them began to remodel the perennial losing club into a winner like the Steelers.

Of historical note the game matched up two franchises previously merged into a single team, "Card-Pitt", for the 1944 season in response to the depleted rosters during World War II. The Steelers were going for their sixth Super Bowl win, which would place it in sole possession of the record for most Super Bowl wins, while the Cardinals were seeking their first league title since 1947 and only the second undisputed league championship in their history. (In 1925, the Pottsville Maroons (who, like Pittsburgh, were based in Pennsylvania) were fined and suspended for playing a game against the Notre Dame football team in another NFL franchise's territory, which resulted in the NFL naming the Cardinals, then based in Chicago, NFL champions in their place, a decision Pottsville disputed). It was the third Super Bowl in history to feature two pre-expansion-era (pre-1960) teams, joining Super Bowl XIV (Steelers vs. Los Angeles Rams, the latter of which coincidentally also went 9–7 in the regular season) and Super Bowl XLI (Indianapolis Colts vs. Chicago Bears). This game also featured the oldest franchise in the NFC playing the oldest franchise in the AFC. The Cardinals were founded in 1898 as an independent amateur team in Chicago. The Steelers, founded in 1933 as the Pittsburgh Pirates, are one of only three AFC teams that pre-date the 1960 NFL season. The Cardinals and Steelers played each other twice per season from 1950 through 1969, first in the American Conference (1950–52), then in the Eastern Conference (1953–66), and finally in the Century Division of the Eastern Conference (1967–69). Both clubs have been owned by the same family since 1933, with Charles Bidwill (Arizona) buying the Cardinals and Art Rooney, Sr. (Pittsburgh) becoming the first owner of the Steelers; as of 2025, the clubs are owned by descendants Michael Bidwill and Art Rooney II.

It also was the first time that two quarterbacks who previously started for a Super Bowl winning team (Kurt Warner and Ben Roethlisberger) opposed one another since Jim Plunkett's Los Angeles Raiders defeated Joe Theismann's Washington Redskins in Super Bowl XVIII. Warner started for the St. Louis Rams in Super Bowl XXXIV and Super Bowl XXXVI, winning the first (aided by a heads-up defensive play by linebacker Mike Jones on the final play of the game) and losing the second one (the first of Tom Brady's seven in ten attempts), while Roethlisberger was the winning quarterback in Super Bowl XL.

==== Pittsburgh Steelers ====
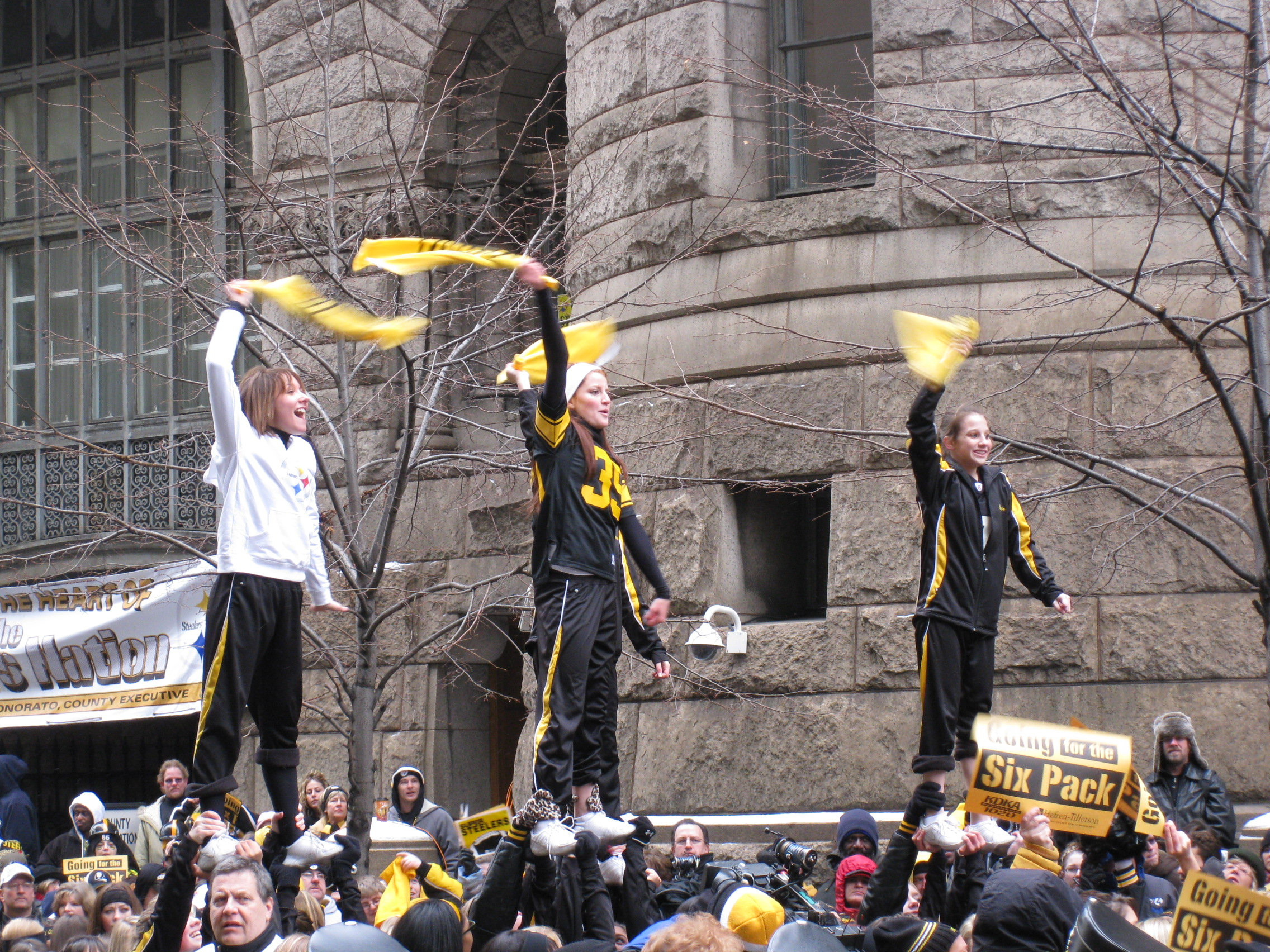
Three Steelers fans waving Terrible Towels at a Pittsburgh rally prior to the game.

Under Tomlin's first season as head coach, the Steelers improved to a 10–6 record in 2007. The Steelers finished the 2008 season with the second best record in the AFC at 12–4, making the playoffs for the sixth time in the last eight seasons, and went on to earn their seventh Super Bowl trip in franchise history, breaking a three-way tie with the New England Patriots and Denver Broncos for second most Super Bowl appearances and most Super Bowl appearances by an AFC team.

The Steelers excelled on defense and led the NFL in fewest points (13.9) and yards (237.2) allowed per game, while also ranking second in sacks with 51. Up front, their line was anchored by defensive end Aaron Smith, who recorded 60 tackles and six sacks. Behind him two of the Steelers starting linebackers ranked among the top-ten sack leaders in the NFL, LaMarr Woodley (11.5 sacks) and Pro Bowler/NFL Defensive Player of the Year James Harrison (16 sacks). Pro Bowl linebacker James Farrior was also a big contributor, recording 3.5 sacks and leading the team with 133 tackles. The Steelers secondary was led by Pro Bowl safety Troy Polamalu, who ranked second in the NFL with a career-high seven interceptions.

For the fifth year in a row the Steelers offense was led by quarterback Ben Roethlisberger, who finished the season with 3,301 passing yards and 17 touchdowns, with 15 interceptions. His top target was the Steelers' all-time receiving leader Hines Ward, who recorded his fifth 1,000-yard season with 81 receptions for 1,043 yards and seven touchdowns. Other reliable receiving options included Santonio Holmes (55 receptions for 821 yards), Nate Washington (40 receptions for 631 yards), and tight end Heath Miller (48 receptions for 514 yards). The Steelers' ground game was led by two-time Pro Bowl running back Willie Parker, who had rushed for over 1,200 yards in each of his previous three seasons. Injuries in 2008 limited him to 791 yards in 11 games, but running back Mewelde Moore proved to be a solid replacement, rushing for 588 yards and catching 40 passes for 320 yards.

For their efforts, Tomlin won the 2008 Motorola Coach of the Year Award and Harrison was named the 2008 GMC Sierra Defensive Player of the Year. The Steelers rolled into the post-season as the AFC's second seed, behind only the Tennessee Titans, who would finish 13–3 but lose in their divisional playoff game against the Baltimore Ravens.

==== Arizona Cardinals ====
The Cardinals’ path to their first Super Bowl appearance was extended. After winning the NFL Championship in 1947, the team did not win another postseason game until the 1998 season, following relocations to two different states. Up to that point, they had not returned to the playoffs after that season.

Under Whisenhunt's first season as head coach, the Cardinals finished with an 8–8 record in 2007. The Cardinals then started out the 2008 season strong, winning 7 of their first 10 games. But then things fell apart as the team lost 4 of their last 6, hitting a low point with a brutal 47–7 loss to the New England Patriots in week 16. The Cardinals' 34–21 win over the Seattle Seahawks in the following week was just enough for them to finish with a 9–7 record and earn the #4 seed in the playoffs, where they went on to earn their first trip to the Super Bowl in franchise history, becoming only the second NFL team to do so with nine wins up to that point (the 2011 New York Giants became the third, winning it all).

One reason for the Cardinals' success was the re-emergence of 37-year-old quarterback Kurt Warner. After going undrafted and spending a few years in the Arena Football League, Warner became the St. Louis Rams starting quarterback in 1999 due to a pre-season injury of starter Trent Green. He went on to lead the Rams to two Super Bowls and one Super Bowl win (in which Warner was named MVP), while also winning two NFL MVP Awards. But in 2002, Warner's production was drastically reduced by injuries and he soon lost his starting job to Marc Bulger. He eventually left the team to join the New York Giants, but once again he lost his starting job (replaced by Eli Manning) and signed on with the Cardinals in 2005. For the third time, Warner lost his starting job due to mediocre performances and injuries. After the season, the Cardinals selected Heisman Trophy winning quarterback Matt Leinart with their first-round draft pick. This, combined with another mediocre performance in the 2006 season, appeared to severely limit Warner's chances of ever being a permanent starter on the team. However, early in the 2007 season, Warner was thrust into the starting lineup to replace an injured Leinart, and by the end of the team's season, he had re-emerged as one of the top quarterbacks in the league, throwing 27 touchdown passes with a passer rating of 89.8.

With his starting job on the team more secure, Warner posted one of his best seasons in 2008, throwing for 4,583 yards and 30 touchdowns, with only 14 interceptions, giving him an NFC-best 96.9 rating. His top targets were receivers Larry Fitzgerald (96 receptions, 1,431 yards, 12 touchdowns), Anquan Boldin (89 receptions, 1,038 yards, 11 touchdowns), and Steve Breaston (77 receptions, 1,006 yards, three touchdowns, 904 special teams return yards), who made the Cardinals the fifth team ever to feature three players with over 1,000 receiving yards. The Cardinals ground game was led by veteran running back Edgerrin James and rookie Tim Hightower. James led the team with 514 yards, while Hightower rushed for 399 and scored 10 touchdowns. He was also a reliable target out of the backfield, catching 34 passes for another 237 yards. Overall, Arizona's offense ranked fourth in yards per game (365.8) and third in scoring (422 points) in 2008.

The Cardinals' defense, however, had played inconsistently during the regular season, ranking just 28th in points allowed. Up front their line was anchored by defensive lineman Bertrand Berry, who recorded five sacks and forced two fumbles, along with tackle Darnell Dockett, known for his ability to blow up running plays. Linebacker Karlos Dansby was also a solid contributor, recording four sacks, two interceptions, and two forced fumbles, while also leading the team with 119 tackles. The Cardinals' secondary was led by rookie cornerback Dominique Rodgers-Cromartie (who led the team with four interceptions) and Pro Bowl safety Adrian Wilson (fourth on the team in tackles, 75).

=== Playoffs ===
The Steelers began their Super Bowl run with a 35–24 win over the fourth-seeded San Diego Chargers, gaining 342 yards, avoiding any turnovers, holding the ball for 36:30 (including for 14:43 in the third quarter alone, an NFL record for a single quarter), and scoring a touchdown in every quarter. Also, Parker appeared to be fully recovered from his regular season injuries, as evidenced by his career postseason high 147-yard, two-touchdown performance against the Chargers. The Steelers then went on to beat, for the third time in the season, their AFC North division archrivals, the sixth-seeded Baltimore Ravens 23–14 in the AFC Championship Game, holding them to 184 yards and forcing five turnovers.

The Cardinals advanced to the Super Bowl by beating the fifth-seeded Atlanta Falcons 30–24, the second-seeded Carolina Panthers, 33–13, and the sixth-seeded Philadelphia Eagles 32–25 in the NFC Championship Game, winning more playoff games this season than they had in their franchise history previously. Warner played exceptionally well in those games, throwing for a total of 661 yards and eight touchdowns, with only two interceptions, giving him a rating of 112.1. The Cardinals also got a big performance out of Larry Fitzgerald, who caught 23 passes for a postseason record 419 yards and five touchdowns. Meanwhile, the Cardinals' 28th-ranked defense showed major improvement in the postseason, forcing twelve turnovers in their three games. This included five interceptions and one fumble from the Panthers' Pro Bowl quarterback Jake Delhomme in the divisional round.

The Cardinals became the third NFL team to advance to the Super Bowl after winning three playoff games despite winning its division; the Carolina Panthers in Super Bowl XXXVIII and the Indianapolis Colts in Super Bowl XLI were the other two. In addition, they would become the first team to advance to the Super Bowl as both a division winner and a No. 4 seed. The 2000 Baltimore Ravens were the last No. 4 seed to advance to a Super Bowl before this game, as they were the No. 4 seed in the AFC when they went on to win Super Bowl XXXV, but were a wild-card team before the 2002 realignment gave each conference four divisions.

=== Super Bowl pre-game notes ===
The AFC champion Steelers stayed at the InterContinental Tampa and held their pre-game practices at the training facility of the University of South Florida Bulls. The NFC champion Cardinals were based at the Grand Hyatt Tampa Bay and held their practices at the Tampa Bay Buccaneers' training facility. Both teams arrived in the Tampa area on Monday, January 26.

Also on January 26, the NFL announced that the Super Bowl game would be one of the safest places in the United States during game time. Personnel from over 20 different federal agencies were on site to assist in protecting players and fans.

The Steelers entered the game as seven-point favorites over the Cardinals. Major factors for this included the view that the Steelers' defense was better than that of the Cardinals and the feeling that the AFC was an overall better conference than the NFC.

The Cardinals were the designated "home team," as was the case for all NFC champions in odd numbered Super Bowls. The Cardinals wore their red jerseys, which it has done at home since moving into University of Phoenix Stadium in 2006 after predominantly wearing their white jerseys at home for their first 18 years in Arizona to combat the intense heat of September and October. As a result, the Steelers wore white jerseys for their second consecutive Super Bowl.

The Steelers improved to 3–0 lifetime wearing white jerseys in the Super Bowl after the victory in Super Bowl XLIII (the Steelers would eventually lose to the Green Bay Packers in Super Bowl XLV while wearing white jerseys). The other two times the team wore white was as the "visiting team" against the Minnesota Vikings in Super Bowl IX (during a time when the designated "home" team was required to wear their team-colored jerseys) and against the Seattle Seahawks in Super Bowl XL despite being the "home team" that season but having road success in the playoffs. In addition, teams wearing white jerseys in the Super Bowl extended their winning streak to five games, dating back to Super Bowl XXXIX, currently the longest such streak between white and team colored jerseys in Super Bowl history. The Steelers also improved to 3–0 lifetime against NFC West teams in the Super Bowl, having previously beaten the Los Angeles Rams in Super Bowl XIV and the Seahawks in XL.

Another pre-game storyline involved backup Steelers tight end/fullback Sean McHugh. McHugh, who had spent the past three seasons with the Detroit Lions, made that team's 53-man roster at the end of the preseason, only to be released 24 hours later alongside linebacker Anthony Cannon in order for the Lions to make room for linebacker Ryan Nece and running back Marcus Thomas. The Steelers promptly signed McHugh after the team traded center Sean Mahan back to the Tampa Bay Buccaneers in exchange for a draft pick before the start of the season. The subsequent media attention surrounding McHugh had to do with him being deemed not good enough for the Lions (a team that would finish 0–16, the NFL's first winless season since the expansion 1976 Tampa Bay Buccaneers), but good enough for a Super Bowl team such as the Steelers and being a valuable blocker for Ben Roethlisberger and Willie Parker. McHugh himself had mixed feelings about the situation, feeling bad for his former Lions teammates, but also feeling it's a little payback for the Lions for releasing him in the first place. McHugh would play in the Super Bowl as a blocker, much like his regular season role.

The Cardinals became the second team to have their city/state location painted in their end zone for a Super Bowl, as their end zone read "Arizona Cardinals." In Super Bowl XL, the Seattle Seahawks became the first team to have this, as their end zone read "Seattle Seahawks." For all other Super Bowl teams, end zones have just featured the team nickname. This was also the first Super Bowl to have the updated NFL logo painted at midfield.

== Economic effects ==
With all the cutbacks resulting from the severe economic downturn in the United States, the game was dubbed "The Recession Bowl." Restaurants were slow in business and many parties, including parties hosted by Playboy and Sports Illustrated were canceled. There were also 200 fewer sports journalists covering the game than at Super Bowl XLII the previous year. According to the online broker StubHub, tickets with a face value of $500 changed hands the week of the Super Bowl for an average $2,500—a 40% drop from Super Bowl XLII in 2008 and 16% lower than Super Bowl XL in 2006. Ford, Chrysler and General Motors, the Big Three automobile makers, decided not to purchase television advertisements following the three companies' business struggles in 2008 and early 2009.

== Broadcasting ==
=== Television ===
==== United States ====
The game was televised live in the United States on NBC, the network's first Super Bowl broadcast since Super Bowl XXXII at the end of the 1997 season.

Play-by-play announcer Al Michaels and color commentator John Madden were in the booth, with Andrea Kremer and Alex Flanagan serving as sideline reporters. Madden became the first person to have announced a Super Bowl for all of the four major U.S. television networks, having called five Super Bowls for CBS, three for Fox, and two for ABC prior to joining NBC in 2006. Meanwhile, Al Michaels was the third man to do play-by-play for a Super Bowl on NBC television (following in the footsteps of Curt Gowdy and Dick Enberg). Also, Michaels (who, like Madden, had moved from ABC to NBC in 2006) was the second person to serve as a Super Bowl play-by-play announcer for two major U.S. television networks (following Pat Summerall of CBS and Fox). This would prove to be the final game Madden would call, as he announced his retirement from broadcasting on April 16, 2009.

The pregame show, a record five hours long at the time, was hosted by the Football Night in America team headed by Bob Costas, and preceded by a two-hour special edition of Today hosted by the regular weekday team live from Tampa and the NFL Films—produced Road to the Super Bowl. Matt Millen was part of the coverage as a studio analyst. The Today contribution included portions of a taped interview with President Barack Obama and pictures of troops viewing the proceedings in Iraq.

The Super Bowl was one of two major professional sports championship series NBC broadcast in 2009, as they would also broadcast the Stanley Cup Finals. Both championship series involved teams from Pittsburgh winning championships. Mike Emrick, Eddie Olczyk, and Pierre McGuire mentioned this when they called the Stanley Cup Finals.

The broadcast was available in 1080i high definition. Super Bowl XLIII was also the final Super Bowl simulcast in the analog television format in the United States before the 2009 completion of nationwide digital television transition. The transition, originally scheduled for February 17 was pushed back to June 12, the same day the Penguins won the Stanley Cup.

In Tucson, Arizona and surrounding areas, the analog but not digital feed of the cable service from Comcast was interrupted by an unknown party, when 30 seconds from Playboy Enterprises-owned adult cable television channel Shorteez was broadcast to homes just after Larry Fitzgerald scored his fourth-quarter touchdown to give the Cardinals a 23–20 lead. Minutes before this occurred, 10 seconds of an end-credit segment from ClubJenna, another Playboy-owned channel, was shown. Comcast offered a $10 credit for customers who claimed to have seen the incident, and the Federal Communications Commission (FCC) announced that it would investigate the cause of the incident. On February 4, 2011, Tucson Police and the FBI arrested Frank Tanori Gonzalez on suspicion of fraud and computer tampering in connection with the porn incident. Gonzalez eventually pleaded guilty and was sentenced to three years of probation.

The telecast was also carried to U.S. service personnel stationed around the globe via the American Forces Network.

===== Ratings =====
With an average U.S. audience of 98.7 million viewers (and an estimated total viewership of 151.6 million), this was the third most watched Super Bowl in history, and the fourth most watched U.S. television program of any kind, trailing only Super Bowl XLV in 2011, which drew an average audience of 111 million; Super Bowl XLIV in 2010, average audience 106.5 million; and the final episode of M*A*S*H in 1983, average audience 106 million. However, the national Nielsen ratings of 42.0 was lower than the 43.3 rating for the previous year's game. The telecast drew a 53.6 rating in Pittsburgh and a 47.5 rating in Phoenix, first and ninth, respectively, among local markets.

===== Advertising =====
In addition to featuring the game's first 1-second TV ad (courtesy of Miller High Life), Super Bowl XLIII marked the first time that a 30-second commercial time slot cost up to US$3 million for the airtime alone, excluding production and talent costs. Many traditional advertisers, such as Anheuser-Busch and PepsiCo, bought multiple ads at discounted rates. None of the "Big Three" U.S. automakers (General Motors, Ford, and Chrysler) ran advertisements during the game; coupled with Cash4Gold.com's third-quarter ad, this was seen as a sign of how deep the recession that began in fall 2008 had become. A short trailer for Transformers: Revenge of the Fallen premiered during the Super Bowl, a debut which director Michael Bay first revealed would occur in January. A preview of the upcoming Star Trek film also premiered during the game. However, with the weak economy, NBC was thought to have turned to companies already buying ad time for an additional purchase or two as set by the Los Angeles-based Forza Migliozzi agency, which would have eight advertisers simultaneously in one 30-second ad. SoBe and DreamWorks Animation aired a 3D trailer for the upcoming film Monsters vs. Aliens, along with a 3D ad for Sobe Life Water that featured Ray Lewis and Matt Light dancing Swan Lake (renamed Lizard Lake for this ad), as well as the promo for the upcoming episode of Chuck in 3D. About 150 million "ColorCode 3-D" glasses were given away at grocery stores across the country for the ad. Hyundai also advertised its new Genesis Coupe in two 30-second commercials. All advertising slots were sold out one day before the game, resulting in sales of $206 million.

The top five ads as chosen by the USA Today Super Bowl Ad Meter were:

1. Doritos' fan-made ad about "free Doritos" being seen in a "crystal ball", with different results for two co-workers. Joseph and Dave Herbert from Batesville, Indiana, creators of the ad, won US$1,000,000;
2. Budweiser's Clydesdale love affair with a dancing horse;
3. Another Budweiser ad seeing another Clydesdale playing fetch showing off after the beer wagon's Dalmatian fetches a small stick;
4. A Bridgestone ad with Mr. and Mrs. Potato Head driving in a toy car on a twisty road;
5. Another Doritos ad that shows the power of crunch with a woman being stripped down to her underwear, free money from an ATM and a policeman being turned into a monkey.

YouTube's top five in "Ad Blitz 2009" also saw the two Doritos ads finish first and fifth. The middle three featured E-Trade's Singing Baby ad, CareerBuilder.com's "The Official 2009 Super Bowl Commercial" and Pepsi Max's "I'm Good" finish second through fourth respectively.

Adbowl results reflected the following ranking:

1. Bridgestone: Taters
2. Bridgestone: Hot Item
3. Doritos: Crystal Ball
4. Coca-Cola: Heist
5. Pepsi Max: I'm Good

==== International ====
- Albania: SuperSport
- Australia: NFL Network coverage was simulcast on ESPN Australia on Foxtel and Austar. NBC commentary and graphics were simulcast free-to-air on Network Ten and Ten HD. The Ten broadcast was anchored by a four-man panel from Melbourne that included analysis from Philadelphia Eagles punter, Australian Sav Rocca. Also shown on SBS starting at 10 am Australian Eastern Standard Time.
- Austria: ORF1, ORF1 HD (midnight CET)
- Brazil: ESPN Brasil. Paulo Antunes (commentating), Everaldo Marques (play-by-play) and André Kfouri (on field).
- Canada: English-language network CTV aired the game live throughout Canada, simulcasting the NBC broadcast, with Canadian law requiring cable and satellite providers to replace NBC's broadcast with CTV's feed (which contains Canadian commercials). The French-language cable channel RDS (also owned by CTV) carried the game using NBC's video feed and its own announcers.
- China: CCTV Sports, China Central Television and SMG (7 am, February 2 Beijing Time). Mainland only.
- Croatia: SportKlub (11:55 pm CET)
- Czech Republic and Slovakia: Nova Sport
- Denmark: TV3+
- Europe: ESPN America
- Finland: Viasat Sport 1, Viasat Sport HD
- France: France 2
- Germany: ARD Das Erste (12:10 am CET)
- Guatemala: ESPN Latin America
- Hungary: Sport1 (Hungarian)
- Iceland: Stöð 2 Sport
- Ireland: TV3 (11 pm GMT)
- Italy: Rai Due and Rai Sport Più (midnight CET), with Valerio Iafrate and Roberto Gotta, RAI's NFL hosts, as commentators. The digital transmission was in 16:9 and HD (where available).
- Japan: NHK, Nippon Television and Gaora. (8 am, February 2 JST)
- Mexico: The game was broadcast on both Televisa and TV Azteca, with both telecasts distributed in HDTV
- Montenegro: Sport Klub (cable), Elmag (terrestrial) (11:55 pm CET)
- New Zealand: ESPN Australia (NFL Network commentators, graphics/NBC simulcast)
- Norway: Viasat Sport, Viasat Sport HD (midnight CET)
- Peru: ESPN, Fox Sports Latin America.
- Philippines: Balls and Solar Sports (both live using the feed from the NFL Network); C/S 9 (delayed)
- Poland: nSport
- Portugal: Sport TV. Also in high definition (16:9) (11 pm WET)
- Russia: 7TV, NTV Plus Sport and NTV Plus HD Sport
- Serbia: SportKlub (11:55 pm CET)
- Singapore with Hong Kong, Malaysia and Indonesia: ASN (All Sports Network)
- South Korea: SBS Sports (8 am, February 2 KST)
- Spain: Digital+ in HD (midnight CET)
- Sweden: TV6, Viasat Sport, Viasat Sport HD (midnight CET)
- Taiwan: Videoland Television Network aired the game live at 7 am, February 2 UTC +8.
- Turkey: Spormax. Also in high definition [16:9] 1 am EET
- United Kingdom: The game was broadcast on Sky Sports and on BBC One with programming starting at 10 pm and at 11 pm GMT, respectively. This was one of only two NFL games broadcast on the BBC, the other being the international series. Coverage was presented by Jake Humphrey live from the venue, with summarizers Rod Woodson and Mike Carlson. Sky Sports' NFL host, Kevin Cadle, was in the studio with guests throughout the event, with co-presenter Nick Halling in Tampa providing analysis live from the event.

An international feed featured Bob Papa and Sterling Sharpe announcing, and was seen in 230 countries (including Antarctica) over 61 networks and 34 languages. ESPN Latin America also broadcast across Latin America.

=== Radio ===
On radio, Westwood One had the national English-language broadcast rights to the game in the United States and Canada. It was only made available to local affiliates as part of a 57-game package of regular season and post-season games. Stations were not allowed to stream the broadcast on their web sites. Marv Albert and Boomer Esiason called the game for the network. The teams' flagship stations also carried the game with their respective local announcers: WDVE-FM and WBGG-AM in Pittsburgh (with Bill Hillgrove and Tunch Ilkin announcing), and KTAR-AM/FM in Phoenix (with Dave Pasch and Ron Wolfley announcing). Univision Radio/United Stations carried a Spanish-language feed for Hispanophone American listeners (with Clemson Smith-Muñiz and David Crommett announcing).

Sirius XM Satellite Radio carried 13 game feeds in ten languages to Sirius subscribers, as well as to XM subscribers with the "Best of Sirius" package. In addition to the four US feeds mentioned above, Sirius carried the following international feeds:

- United Kingdom: BBC Radio 5 Live (English; Arlo White announcing)
- Russia: NTV Plus (Russian)
- France: France 2 (French)
- Japan: NHK (Japanese)
- Germany: ARD (German)
- Belgium: Telenet (Flemish)
- China: SMG (Mandarin Chinese)
- Italy: RAI (Italian; Iafrate-Gotta's TV audio)
- Spain: Cadena Ser (Spanish)

FieldPass, the subscription Internet radio service provided by the league at NFL.com, carried most of these feeds, with select international feeds for free. Due to contractual restrictions, only Sirius XM and FieldPass were permitted to carry the local team broadcasts along with WDVE, WBGG, and KTAR, with the teams' other network radio affiliates instead carrying the Westwood One feed.

== Entertainment and other ceremonies ==
=== Pregame ===
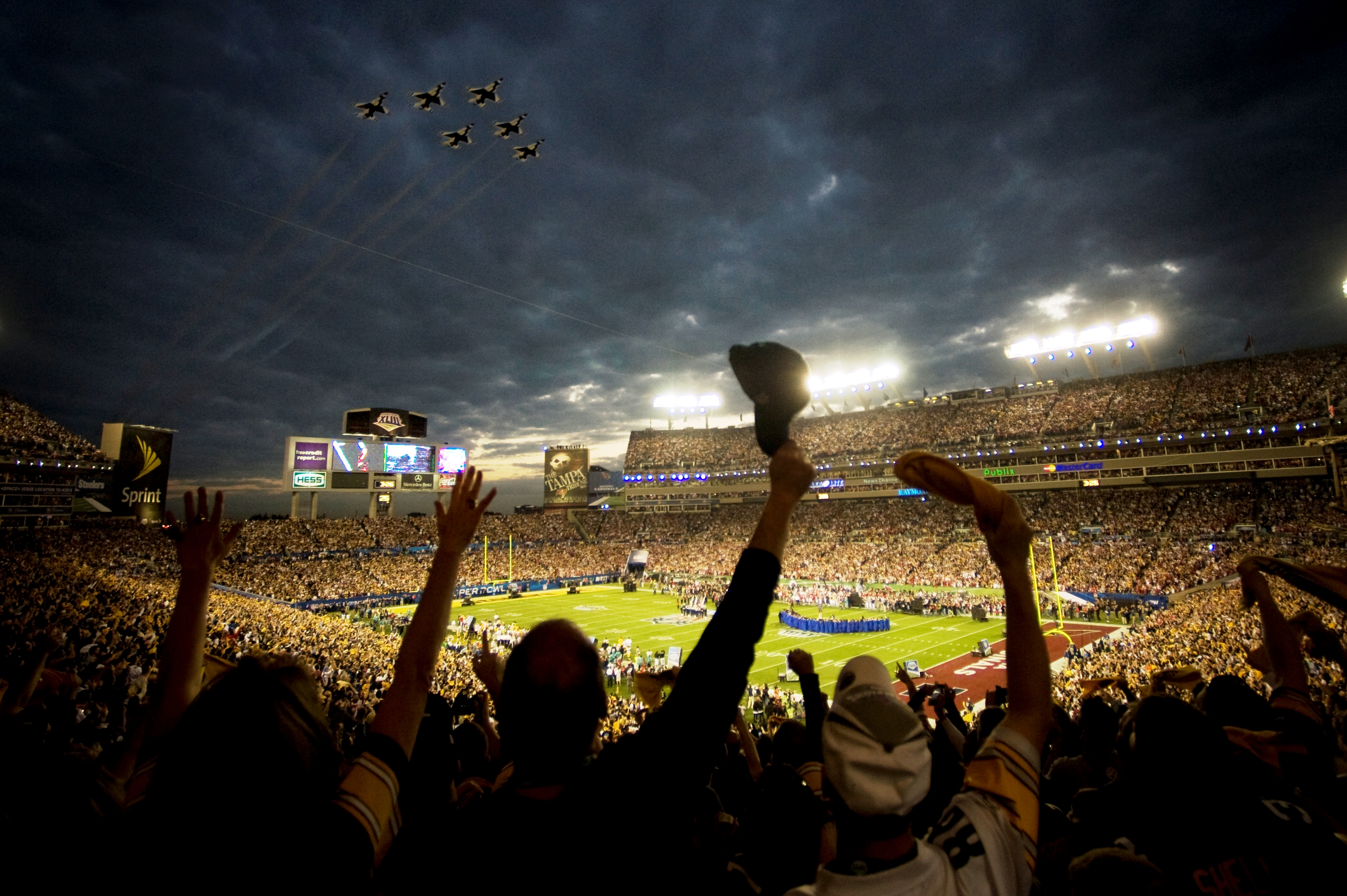
Fans wave as the United States Air Force Thunderbirds fly over the stadium during the pregame ceremony

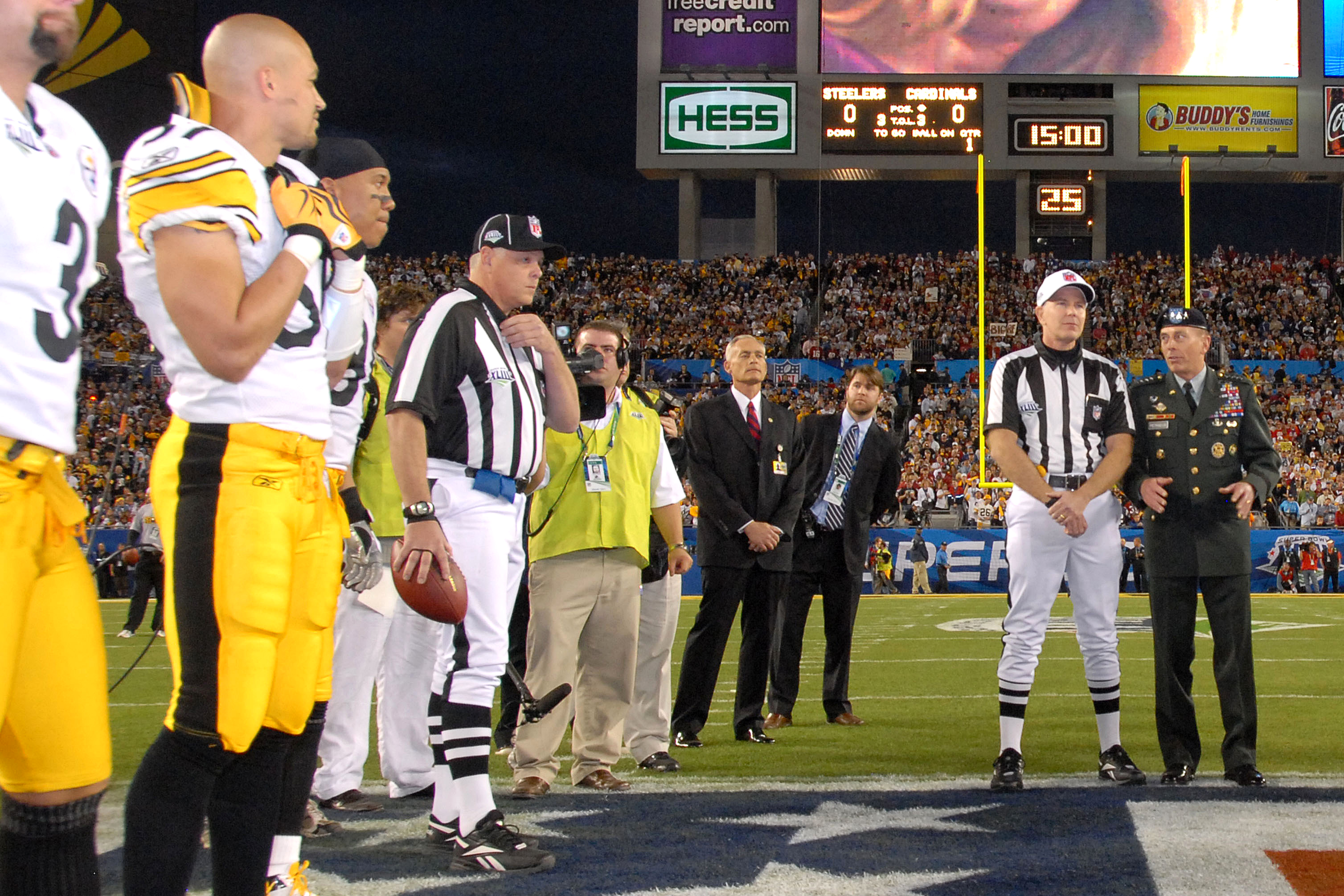
Gen. David Petraeus talks with head Super Bowl XLIII referee Terry McAulay prior to the coin toss

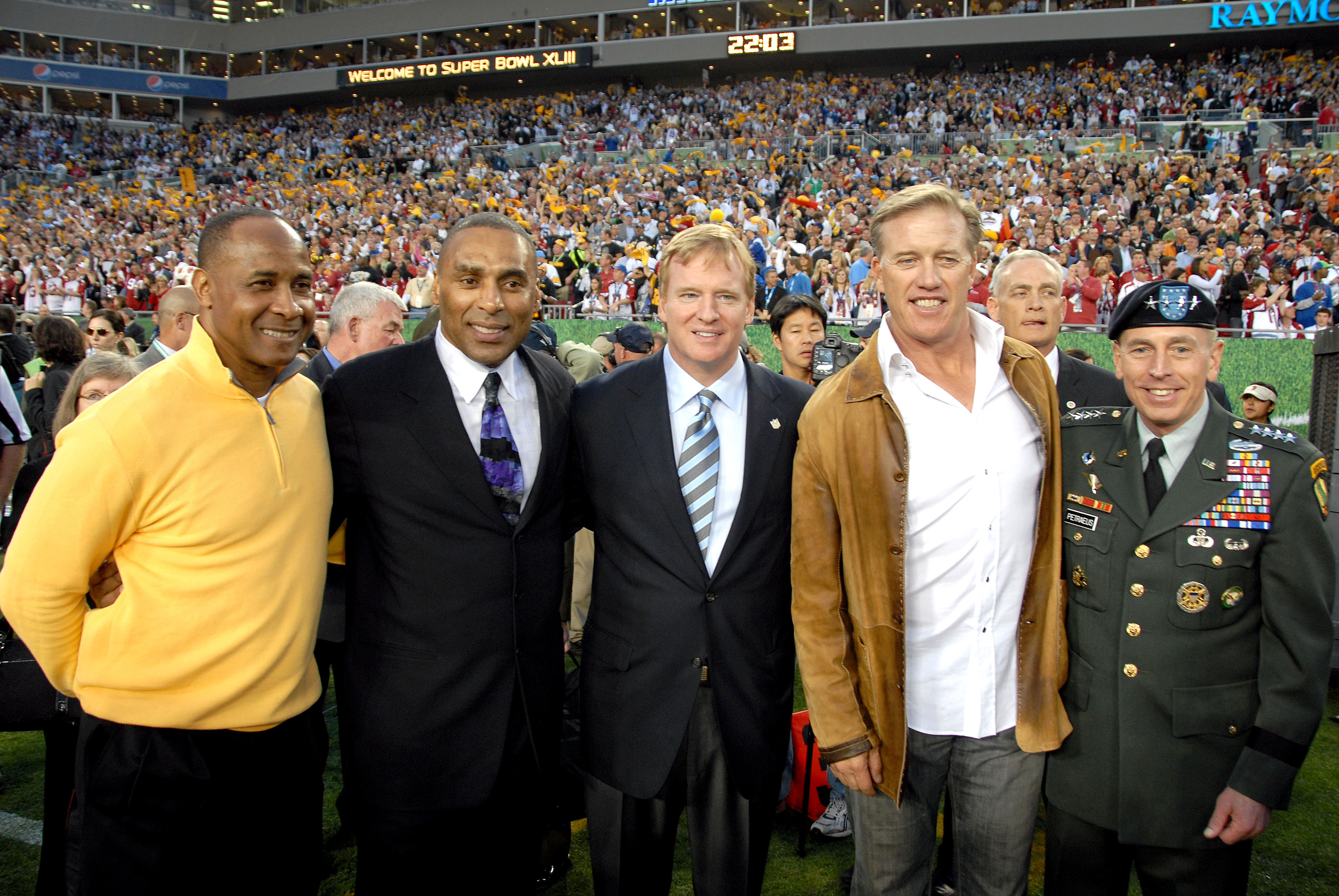
Lynn Swann, Roger Craig, NFL Commissioner Roger Goodell, John Elway, and Gen. David Petraeus

Journey and the Bethune-Cookman University Marching Wildcats performed during the pre-game show, while Jennifer Hudson sang "The Star-Spangled Banner" (arranged by Chris Walden) in her first public appearance since the murder of her nephew, brother and mother. Hudson became the second consecutive alumna from the American Idol television series to perform the national anthem at a Super Bowl (Jordin Sparks sang the anthem at Super Bowl XLII). The national anthem was translated into American Sign Language by Kristen Santos. Following the anthem, the United States Air Force Thunderbirds performed a fly-over in their custom painted F-16C Fighting Falcons. John Legend performed a short concert several hours before the game, while Faith Hill performed "America the Beautiful" prior to Hudson's performance of the national anthem. Hill also performed in NBC's opening prior to the game. Also, the crew of US Airways Flight 1549 were recognized on field for their actions.

The NFL saluted four decades of champions during the coin toss ceremony and the Vince Lombardi Trophy presentation. The coin toss featured Roger Craig (Super Bowl XXIII, 1989), John Elway (Super Bowl XXXIII, 1999), and Lynn Swann (Super Bowl XIII, 1979). Craig followed the previous year's participants and fellow San Francisco 49ers Craig Walsh (son of Bill Walsh), Ronnie Lott, Jerry Rice, and Steve Young. General David Petraeus performed the actual coin toss. The Steelers called tails, but it landed on heads, so the Cardinals won the toss. Arizona deferred their choice to the second half, and the Steelers chose to receive, making it the first time in Super Bowl history that the coin toss winner kicked off to start the game. (The NFL had just changed the rule before the start of the season allowing the team that wins the coin toss to defer the choice to the second half, similar to that in college football and Canadian football.) By winning the toss, the Arizona Cardinals were the twelfth consecutive coin toss winner from the NFC, dating back to Super Bowl XXXII. Joe Namath (Super Bowl III, 1969) participated in the Vince Lombardi Trophy presentation and he previously participated in the coin toss in Super Bowl XXVIII. Namath, a native of Beaver Falls, Pennsylvania, ultimately handed the trophy to his hometown team.

=== Halftime ===
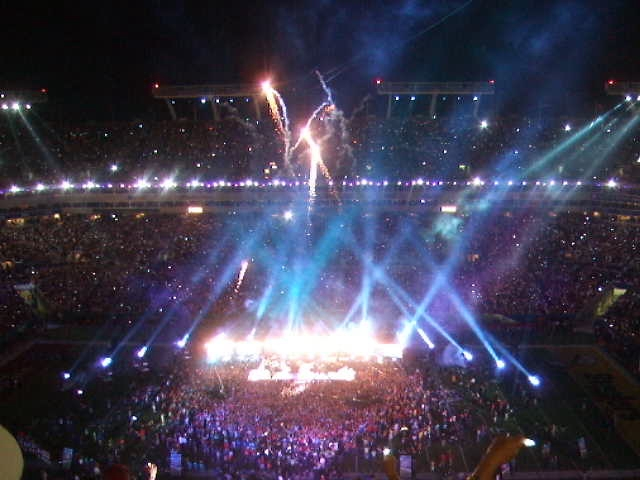
Halftime show

The Super Bowl XLIII halftime show, which was sponsored by Bridgestone for the second consecutive year, featured Bruce Springsteen and the E Street Band, with the Miami Horns and a gospel choir. Their halftime performance consisted of these songs in the following order:

- "Tenth Avenue Freeze-Out"
- "Born to Run"
- "Working on a Dream"
- "Glory Days"

Each of the numbers had at least one verse removed, in order to fit the overall performance in the intended 12-minute time limit. Springsteen had turned down numerous invitations to play at the Super Bowl before this one, unsure of its legitimacy, but finally accepted after realizing the prestige value.

=== Home video ===
The Steelers 2008 season/Super Bowl XLIII championship home video went on sale on DVD on February 24, 2009. One week later on March 3, it was released on Blu-ray, making it the first NFL Films home video release to be on Blu-ray Disc.

== Game summary ==
External videos
- Full game broadcast on NBC on YouTube

=== First quarter ===
The Steelers took the opening kickoff and moved down the field on a 71-yard scoring drive, with quarterback Ben Roethlisberger completing a 38-yard pass to wide receiver Hines Ward and a 21-yard strike to tight end Heath Miller, putting the ball on the Cardinals' 1-yard line. The Cardinals' defense kept the Steelers' offense out of the end zone for the first two plays, but on third down, Roethlisberger appeared to score on a 1-yard quarterback draw. However, a replay challenge by the Cardinals determined that his knee hit the ground as he was being tackled by defensive lineman Darnell Dockett before he could stretch the ball over the goal line. Rather than take the risk on fourth down, the Steelers settled for an 18-yard field goal by kicker Jeff Reed to take a 3–0 lead. The Steelers quickly forced a Cardinals punt and then drove back down the field for what would turn into more points. On the first play of their drive, Roethlisberger completed a 25-yard pass to wide receiver Santonio Holmes and followed it up with two 11-yard completions to Miller, the second of which was a 3rd-and-10 conversion.

=== Second quarter ===
On the second play of the second quarter, running back Gary Russell went into the end zone for a 1-yard touchdown run, increasing the Steelers' lead to 10–0. They became the first team to score on its first two drives since the Denver Broncos in Super Bowl XXXII. On defense, the Steelers held the Cardinals to just one drive and one first down in the first quarter, while gaining 135 yards.

The Cardinals responded with a nine-play, 83-yard scoring drive. First, quarterback Kurt Warner completed three passes to running back Edgerrin James for 26 yards, as well as two passes to wide receiver Steve Breaston for 20. Warner then completed a 45-yard strike to wide receiver Anquan Boldin to reach the Steelers' 1-yard line. On the next play, Warner nearly fell over after taking the snap, but he quickly regained his balance and threw a 1-yard touchdown pass to tight end Ben Patrick, cutting the Cardinals' deficit to 10–7. It was Patrick's only touchdown reception of the season. After an exchange of punts, Roethlisberger threw a pass that was deflected by defensive tackle Bryan Robinson and intercepted by linebacker Karlos Dansby at the Steelers' 34-yard line just before the two-minute warning. Seven plays later, the Cardinals reached the Steelers' 1-yard line with a chance to take the lead before halftime.

But with 18 seconds left, Warner's pass intended for Boldin was intercepted at the goal line by linebacker James Harrison, who then took off down the sideline for the then-longest play in Super Bowl history (having since been passed by Jacoby Jones' 108-yard kickoff return in Super Bowl XLVII), a 100-yard pick-six, increasing the Steelers' lead to 17–7 at halftime. Harrison faked a blitz and quietly moved into coverage to pick off Warner's pass. Cornerback Deshea Townsend asked the slower Harrison for the ball, but Harrison told him to block; Several Steelers defenders made multiple blocks downfield to help get Harrison into the end zone. The Ringer described the play as "like a Fast & Furious crew pulling off a bank heist." A booth review was called to verify that Harrison had broken the plane, as he was tackled at the goal line by Breaston and wide receiver Larry Fitzgerald, and the ruling stood.

=== Third quarter ===
After forcing the Cardinals to punt to start the second half, the Steelers put together another long scoring drive. Aided by two 15-yard gains by Holmes and running back Willie Parker, as well as three personal foul penalties against the Cardinals' defense, including one during a field goal attempt, the Steelers moved the ball 79 yards in 15 plays and took 8:39 off the clock. However, despite picking up two first downs inside the Cardinals' 10-yard line, they were unable to get into the end zone, forcing them to settle for Reed's 21-yard field goal to increase their lead to 20–7.

=== Fourth quarter ===
After the teams traded punts again going into the fourth quarter, Warner led the Cardinals down the field on an eight-play, 87-yard scoring drive that took 3:57 off the clock, utilizing a no huddle offense. All eight plays of the drive were consecutive short passes by Warner, half of which were caught by Fitzgerald for a total gain of 31 yards, including a 1-yard touchdown in which Warner threw a fade pass to Fitzgerald, who made a leaping catch through tight coverage by cornerback Ike Taylor. The score cut the Cardinals' deficit to one possession at 20–14 with 7:33 left in the game.

On the Cardinals' next possession, they reached the Steelers' 26-yard line, but a holding penalty pushed them nearly out of field goal range. Warner then threw three consecutive incompletions, and the Cardinals elected to punt rather than risk a 53-yard field goal attempt. Ben Graham's 34-yard punt pinned the Steelers back at their own 1-yard line. After being stopped for no gain on the first two plays, Roethlisberger threw a 19-yard pass to Holmes, but Steelers center Justin Hartwig was flagged for offensive holding in the end zone, which not only nullified the catch, but gave the Cardinals a safety, cutting the Steelers' lead to 20–16 and forcing them to punt the ball away. Steelers head coach Mike Tomlin later stated that giving up the safety didn't faze him, as it did not change how his team called plays for the rest of the game on either defense or offense. Taking over on their own 36-yard line after the free kick, the Cardinals took two plays to score, as Warner threw a pass to Fitzgerald on a post route. Fitzgerald caught the ball without breaking stride and took off down the middle of the field past the Steelers' secondary for a 64-yard touchdown reception, giving the Cardinals their first lead of the game, 23–20.

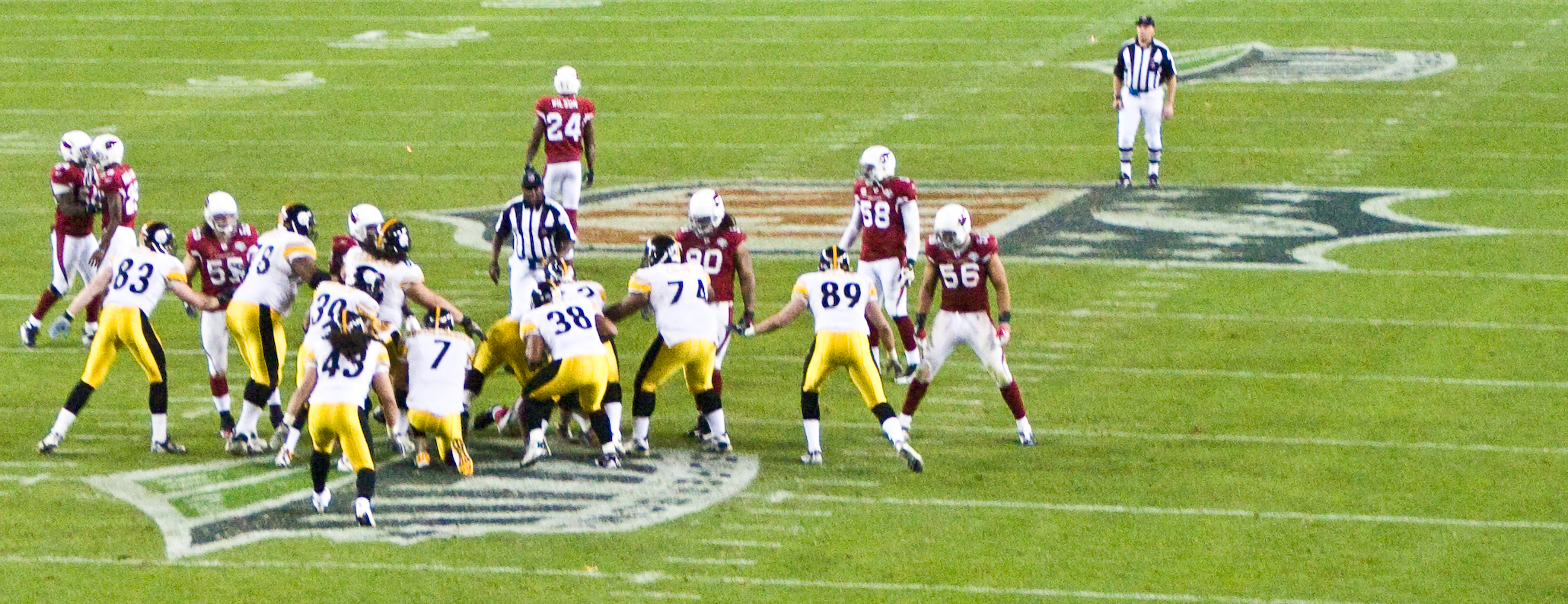
The final play of the game

With a chance to mount a game-tying/winning drive, the Steelers got the ball back on their own 22-yard line with 2:37 left in the game and two timeouts remaining. On the first play, a holding penalty pushed them back to their own 12-yard line. Roethlisberger then completed a pass to Holmes for 14 yards. After an incompletion, Roethlisberger threw it to Holmes again for 13 yards. An 11-yard reception by wide receiver Nate Washington followed, and a 4-yard run by Roethlisberger forced the Steelers to burn their second timeout of the half. On the very next play, he completed a pass to Holmes, who took it 40 yards to the Cardinals' 6-yard line after safety Aaron Francisco tripped. Two plays later, Roethlisberger found running back Mewelde Moore covered in the flat, then Ward covered. He looked and then threw to Holmes, who ran a flag route in the right corner. Holmes caught the pass in the back corner of the end zone for a 6-yard touchdown reception, managing to keep both feet in bounds while landing on his toes before falling out of bounds. "My feet never left the ground," said Holmes. "All I did was extend my arms and use my toes as an extension to catch up to the ball." After a booth review, the touchdown stood and put the Steelers back in front with a 27–23 lead and 35 seconds remaining. Following the ensuing kickoff, Warner completed a 20-yard pass to Fitzgerald and a 13-yard pass to running back J. J. Arrington, moving the ball to the Steelers 44-yard line. With 15 seconds left, Warner prepared to attempt a Hail Mary pass, but linebacker LaMarr Woodley strip-sacked Warner, and defensive end Brett Keisel recovered the fumble, giving the ball back to the Steelers with five seconds left. Many viewers assumed that the play had not been reviewed for a possible incomplete pass, but NFL Head of Officiating Mike Pereira later explained that it actually was reviewed, unnoticed by the public: "We confirmed it was a fumble. The replay assistant in the replay booth saw it was clearly a fumble. The ball got knocked loose and was rolling in his hand before it started forward. He has to have total control." It was the first and only Super Bowl in which Warner was involved not to be decided on the final play of the game. Roethlisberger's ensuing kneeldown secured the Steelers' sixth Super Bowl victory, surpassing the Dallas Cowboys and San Francisco 49ers to set a new NFL record for most Super Bowl wins by a team.

=== Box score ===
Super Bowl XLIII: Pittsburgh Steelers 27, Arizona Cardinals 23

Quarter	1	2	3	4	Total
Steelers (AFC)	3	14	3	7	27
Cardinals (NFC)	0	7	0	16	23

at Raymond James Stadium, Tampa, Florida

- Date: February 1, 2009
- Game time: 6:31 p.m. EST
- Game weather: 66 °F (19 °C), mostly cloudy
- Game attendance: 70,774
- Referee: Terry McAulay
- TV announcers (NBC): Al Michaels, John Madden, Andrea Kremer, Alex Flanagan
- Recap

Scoring summary

Quarter	Time	Drive			Team	Scoring information	Score	
Quarter	Time	Plays	Yards	TOP	Team	Scoring information	PIT	ARI
1	9:45	9	71	5:15	PIT	18-yard field goal by Jeff Reed	3	0
2	14:01	11	69	7:12	PIT	Gary Russell 1-yard touchdown run, Reed kick good	10	0
2	8:34	9	83	5:27	ARI	Ben Patrick 1-yard touchdown reception from Kurt Warner, Neil Rackers kick good	10	7
2	0:00	—	—	—	PIT	Interception returned 100 yards for touchdown by James Harrison, Reed kick good	17	7
3	2:11	16	79	8:39	PIT	21-yard field goal by Reed	20	7
4	7:33	8	87	3:57	ARI	Larry Fitzgerald 1-yard touchdown reception from Warner, Rackers kick good	20	14
4	2:58	—	—	—	ARI	Offensive holding penalty on Justin Hartwig in the end zone for a safety	20	16
4	2:37	2	67	0:21	ARI	Fitzgerald 64-yard touchdown reception from Warner, Rackers kick good	20	23
4	0:35	8	78	2:02	PIT	Santonio Holmes 6-yard touchdown reception from Ben Roethlisberger, Reed kick good	27	23
"TOP" = time of possession. For other American football terms, see Glossary of American football.							27	23

=== Statistical overview ===
In Super Bowl XLIII, the Cardinals and Steelers combined for the fewest rushing attempts (38) and the fewest rushing yards (91) in Super Bowl history. The Cardinals outgained the Steelers in both passing yards (374 to 234) and total yards (407 to 292), but were flagged for 11 penalties for 106 yards. The Cardinals' safety in the fourth quarter was only the sixth one scored in Super Bowl history and the first since Super Bowl XXV.

Warner completed 31 of 43 passes for 377 yards and three touchdowns, with one interception. His 377 yards was the second-most in Super Bowl history behind his own record of 414 yards in Super Bowl XXXIV. Eight years later at Super Bowl LI, Tom Brady would break Kurt Warner's record with 466 yards. Warner passed Joe Montana for most career yards in Super Bowl history with 1,156 (Montana threw for 1,142 yards in four games). Brady ultimately reached 2,071 yards in seven Super Bowls. Warner became the fifth quarterback in Super Bowl history to throw three touchdown passes in defeat (the others being Roger Staubach, Brett Favre, Jake Delhomme, and Donovan McNabb). He also became the first quarterback in Super Bowl history to have a pass intercepted and returned for a touchdown in two different Super Bowls and is also the second quarterback to throw a fourth-quarter touchdown in three different Super Bowls (Terry Bradshaw threw a fourth-quarter touchdown in all four of his Super Bowls).

Warner's top target was Fitzgerald, who caught seven passes for 127 yards and two touchdowns. Fitzgerald set a single-postseason record with seven touchdown receptions, passing Jerry Rice, who had six in the 1988 postseason. Fitzgerald as well as Holmes each had 100 yards receiving, marking the fourth time in Super Bowl history, one player from each team had over 100 yards in a Super Bowl. Michael Irvin and Andre Reed were the first in Super Bowl XXVII, followed by Deion Branch and Muhsin Muhammad in Super Bowl XXXVIII and Branch again a year later along with Terrell Owens in Super Bowl XXXIX.

Roethlisberger completed 21 of 30 passes for 256 yards and a touchdown, with one interception. Woodley had two sacks and a forced fumble, thus he continued setting NFL play-off records for consecutive multiple sack games by a player with 4. Cardinals defensive tackle Darnell Dockett had all of the Cardinals' three sacks, tying the Super Bowl record set by Reggie White in Super Bowl XXXI. Harrison's 100-yard interception return is still the longest interception return in Super Bowl history.

With this victory, the Steelers became the first team to win three Super Bowls in the same state. Their victories in Super Bowls X and XIII were both at the Miami Orange Bowl.

== Final statistics ==
Sources: NFL.com Super Bowl XLIII, Super Bowl XLIII Play Finder Pit, Super Bowl XLIII Play Finder Arz, USA Today Super Bowl XLIII Play by Play

=== Statistical comparison ===
	Pittsburgh Steelers	Arizona Cardinals
First downs	20	23
First downs rushing	4	2
First downs passing	12	20
First downs penalty	4	1
Third down efficiency	4/10	3/8
Fourth down efficiency	0/0	0/0
Net yards rushing	58	33
Rushing attempts	25	12
Yards per rush	2.3	2.8
Passing – Completions-attempts	21/30	31/43
Times sacked-total yards	3–22	2–3
Interceptions thrown	1	1
Net yards passing	234	374
Total net yards	292	407
Punt returns-total yards	2–5	2–34
Kickoff returns-total yards	4–80	5–91
Interceptions-total return yards	1–100	1–(–1)
Punts-average yardage	3–46.3	5–36.0
Fumbles-lost	0–0	2–1
Penalties-yards	7–56	11–106
Time of possession	33:01	26:59
Turnovers	1	2

Records set
Most wins, team	6	Pittsburgh
Longest Play	100 yards int. return	James Harrison, Pittsburgh.
Longest Interception return	100 yards	James Harrison, Pittsburgh.
Most 300-yard passing games, career	3	Kurt Warner, St. Louis-Arizona
Most passing yards, career	1,156	Kurt Warner, St. Louis-Arizona
Most first downs, passing, team	20	Arizona
Fewest first downs rushing, both teams	6	Arizona (2), Pittsburgh (4)
Fewest rushing attempts, both teams	38	Arizona (12), Pittsburgh (26)
Fewest rushing yards, both teams	91 yards	Arizona (33), Pittsburgh (58)
Youngest winning head coach	36	Mike Tomlin, Pittsburgh
Youngest head coach	36	Mike Tomlin, Pittsburgh
Records tied
Most first downs, passing, both teams	32	Arizona (20), Pittsburgh (12)
Most first downs, penalty	4	Pittsburgh
Most safeties, team	1	Arizona

=== Individual statistics ===
Steelers passing
	C/ATT^{1}	Yds	TD	INT	Rating
Ben Roethlisberger	21/30	256	1	1	93.2
Steelers rushing
	Car^{2}	Yds	TD	LG^{3}	Yds/Car
Willie Parker	19	53	0	15	2.79
Mewelde Moore	1	6	0	6	6.00
Ben Roethlisberger	3	2	0	4	0.67
Gary Russell	2	–3	1	1	–1.50
Steelers receiving
	Rec^{4}	Yds	TD	LG^{3}	Target^{5}
Santonio Holmes	9	131	1	40	12
Heath Miller	5	57	0	21	7
Hines Ward	2	43	0	38	3
Nate Washington	1	11	0	11	4
Carey Davis	1	6	0	6	1
Matt Spaeth	1	6	0	6	1
Mewelde Moore	1	4	0	4	1
Willie Parker	1	−2	0	−2	1

Cardinals passing
	C/ATT^{1}	Yds	TD	INT	Rating
Kurt Warner	31/43	377	3	1	112.3
Cardinals rushing
	Car^{2}	Yds	TD	LG^{3}	Yds/Car
Edgerrin James	9	33	0	9	3.67
Tim Hightower	1	0	0	0	0.00
J. J. Arrington	1	0	0	0	0.00
Kurt Warner	1	0	0	0	0.00
Cardinals receiving
	Rec^{4}	Yds	TD	LG^{3}	Target^{5}
Anquan Boldin	8	84	0	45	12
Larry Fitzgerald	7	127	2	64	8
Steve Breaston	6	71	0	23	6
Edgerrin James	4	28	0	11	5
J.J. Arrington	2	35	0	22	2
Tim Hightower	2	13	0	13	3
Jerheme Urban	1	18	0	18	2
Ben Patrick	1	1	1	1	2
Leonard Pope	0	0	0	0	1

^{1}Completions/attempts ^{2}Carries ^{3}Long gain ^{4}Receptions ^{5}Times targeted

== Starting lineups ==
Source: Hall of Fame ‡

Pittsburgh	Position	Position	Arizona
Offense
Max Starks	LT		Mike Gandy
Chris Kemoeatu	LG		Reggie Wells
Justin Hartwig	C		Lyle Sendlein
Darnell Stapleton	RG		Deuce Lutui
Willie Colon	RT		Levi Brown
Heath Miller	TE		Leonard Pope
Hines Ward	WR		Larry Fitzgerald‡
Matt Spaeth	TE	WR	Anquan Boldin
Ben Roethlisberger	QB		Kurt Warner‡
Sean McHugh	TE	RB	Edgerrin James‡
Willie Parker	RB	FB	Terrelle Smith
Defense
Aaron Smith	DE	LDE	Antonio Smith
Casey Hampton	NT		Bryan Robinson
Brett Keisel	DE	DT	Darnell Dockett
LaMarr Woodley	OLB	RDE	Gabe Watson
James Farrior	LILB	SLB	Chike Okeafor
Larry Foote	RILB	LB	Gerald Hayes
James Harrison	OLB	LB	Monty Beisel
Ike Taylor	LCB	LB	Karlos Dansby
Ryan Clark	FS	RCB	Dominique Rodgers-Cromartie
Troy Polamalu‡	SS		Adrian Wilson
Bryant McFadden	RCB	FS	Antrel Rolle

== Officials ==
The officials for the game were:

- Referee: Terry McAulay, #77; second Super Bowl, refereed Super Bowl XXXIX.
- Umpire: Roy Ellison #81; first of four Super Bowls (Super Bowl LII, LVII, LX)
- Head linesman: Derick Bowers #74; first Super Bowl
- Line judge: Mark Perlman #9; second of three Super Bowls (Super Bowl XL, XLIX)
- Field judge: Greg Gautreaux #80; first Super Bowl
- Side judge: Michael Banks #72; first Super Bowl
- Back judge: Keith Ferguson #61; first of two Super Bowls (Super Bowl 50)
- Replay official: Bob McGrath
- IR video operator: Clayton Judge
- Alternate officials
  - Referee: Ron Winter, #14
  - Umpire: Darrell Jenkins #76
  - Line judge: Darryll Lewis #130
  - Field judge: Doug Rosenbaum #67
  - Back judge: Billy Smith #2

== Post-game riots ==
In Pittsburgh, mostly in the South Side and Oakland neighborhoods, riots broke out on the streets after the Steelers' victory. Rioters (mostly college students) caused about $150,000 in estimated damages. More than 60 people were arrested during and after the rioting, and at least two students were suspended.

== Super Bowl ring ==
External image
- Photo of the Super Bowl Ring

The ring for the Pittsburgh Steelers was designed and made by Jostens working with Dan Rooney and Art Rooney II. The designs were also shown to James Farrior, Hines Ward, Ben Roethlisberger and James Harrison before a final decision was made.
