= TV3 (Swedish TV channel) =

- Country: Sweden
- Broadcast area: Sweden

Programming
- Picture format: 1080i HDTV (downscaled to 16:9 576i for the SDTV feed)

Ownership
- Owner: Viaplay Group
- Sister channels: TV6; TV8; TV10; V Film; V Series; V Sport

History
- Launched: 31 December 1987

Links
- Website: tv3.se

TV3 (TV tre) is a Swedish pay television channel owned by Viaplay Group. It was launched on 31 December 1987 by businessman Jan Stenbeck.

The channel was initially broadcast across all of Scandinavia. In 1990, separate Danish and Norwegian feeds were launched. The channel's name refers to its launch at a time when television in Sweden was dominated by the two channels of SVT.

== History ==
TV3 was launched on 31 December 1987 and was the first commercial channel to broadcast in Sweden, Norway and Denmark. The channel was transmitted from London, in order to circumvent legislation that prohibited advertising being broadcast on Swedish television.

TV3 was one of the first channels to be broadcast on the Astra 1A satellite when that launched in 1989; in addition, TV3 Sweden became available through cable television in many cities. In 1989, TV3 bought the rights to broadcast the Ice Hockey World Championships and the Wimbledon tennis championships: their purchase of the former created major headlines in Swedish newspapers, as very few Swedes had access to TV3 at the time, whereas the interest in ice hockey in Sweden was high. As a result of this, TV3 made an agreement with SVT to allow them to broadcast the ice hockey matches on a 15 minute delay, in exchange for SVT producing the broadcasts. In 1991, music channel ZTV was launched as a program block on TV3. That same year, TV3 made a profit for the first time.

In mid-2006, TV3 began to broadcast six different regional versions, for advertising purposes; this made it possible to broadcast advertising directed to individual regions via the channel, an advertising form that TV4 previously had a monopoly on. On satellite, all six versions are distributed. On other networks, Boxer and their respective cable operators transmit the regional version for the relevant area. Today, the channel is available via satellite (DVB-S/S2 through the owner MTG's Viasat and also at competing Canal Digital, digital terrestrial and cable.

Post-Brexit, the channel announced in October 2020 that it would, for the first time in its history, broadcast with a Swedish licence beginning in 2021, in order to continue broadcasting from within the EU.

== Programming ==
TV3 originally aired factual programs, news (originally for 20 minutes, later only for 3 minutes only), reality TV shows, game shows, children's programs and pure commercial programmes. In 2006, it became an entertainment channel, having dropped all daily news programmes in 2008. After the launch of digital terrestrial television, bringing with it increased competition, acquired films and TV programming have formed the backbone of the channel's output. Previous original programming included reality and game shows like Expedition: Robinson (bought from SVT in 2004) as well as some factual programs.

== Logos ==
TV3 logo used from 2002 until 2009

Current logo, used since 2009
