= V Sport Hockey =

- Country: United Kingdom
- Broadcast area: Sweden; Finland
- Network: V Sport

Programming
- Picture format: 16:9

Ownership
- Owner: Viaplay Group
- Sister channels: V Sport Football; V Sport Motor; V Sport Golf; V Sport Extra; V Sport Premium; V Sport 1 V Sport Ultra HD; V Sport Live

History
- Launched: 1 September 2009
- Closed: 2011 (Baltics); 2017 (Norway)

Availability

Terrestrial
- Digita (Finland): Channel 65 (SD)
- DNA (Finland): Channel 119 (HD)

V Sport Hockey is a sports channel broadcasting from the United Kingdom, primarily targeting Sweden but also available in Finland and Norway. Broadcasting commenced on 1 September 2009, at the start of the 2009 ice hockey season. The channel focuses on the KHL, HockeyAllsvenskan, Kvalserien, Ice Hockey World Championships and NHL.

The launch of the channel was announced 7 May 2009 during the 2009 Men's World Ice Hockey Championships. The channel is included in the Viasat sports package via satellite. The channel is available through the cable- and broadband networks, and the games from HockeyAllsvenskan shown on TV are available through the streaming service Viasat OnDemand.

In 2011, the channel ceased operations in the Baltics.

In 2017, the channel became a part of Viasport in Norway.

In 2020, the channel was renamed V Sport Hockey.
