= TV8 (Swedish TV channel) =

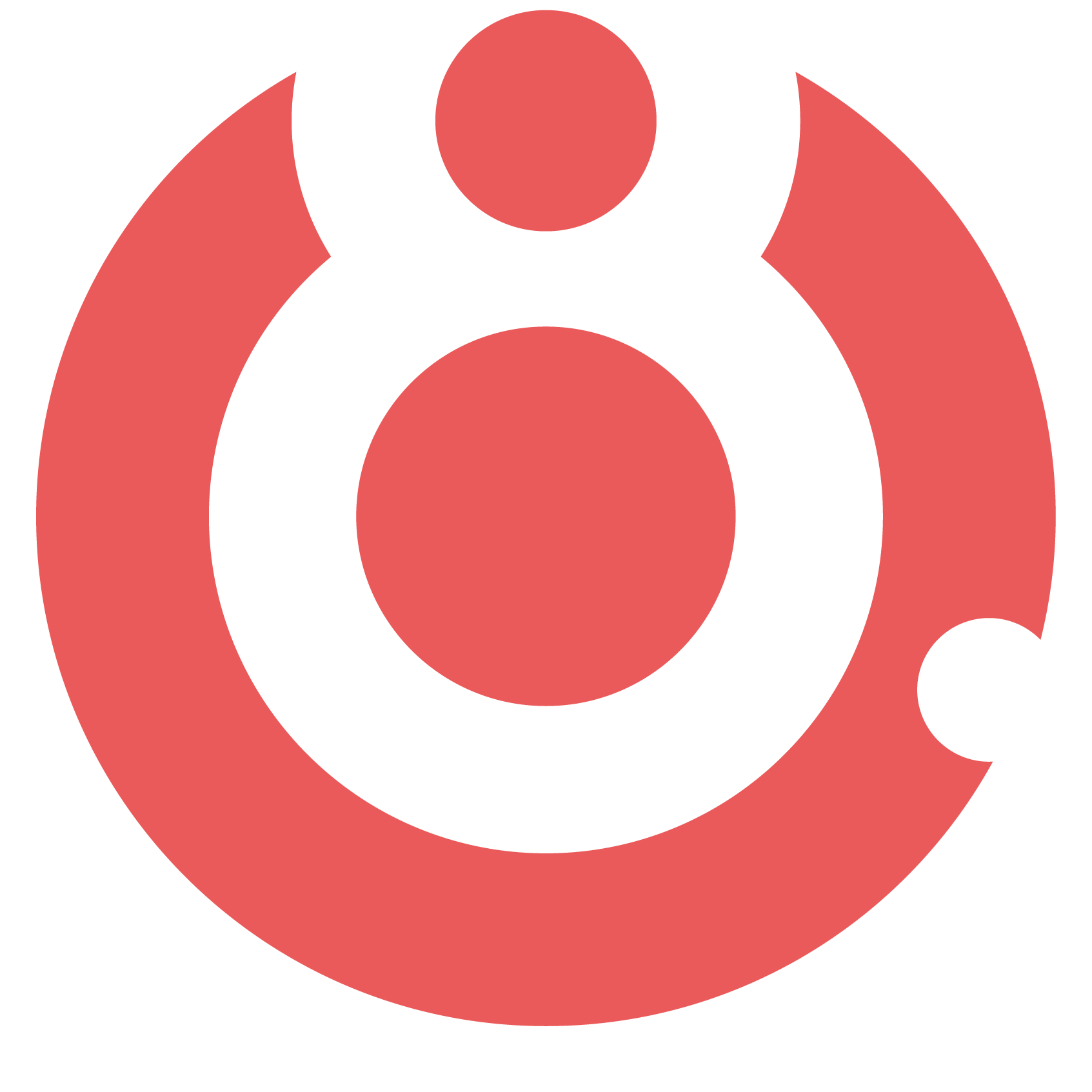
- Broadcast area: Sweden

Programming
- Picture format: 576i SDTV

Ownership
- Owner: Viaplay Group
- Sister channels: TV3; TV6; TV10; V Film; V Series; V Sport

History
- Launched: 15 October 1997

Links
- Website: http://www.tv8.se/

TV8 is a television channel owned by Viaplay Group broadcasting to Sweden. It focuses on current affairs, documentaries and drama. The channel was started by the private equity firm Ratos in 1997 and was sold to MTG in 1999.

For some years TV8 timeshared with the Scandinavian History Channel in the evening and Bloomberg Television at night and during the day; TV8's own shows were only broadcast during a few hours in the late evening. During the American invasion of Iraq in 2003 Bloomberg was replaced by the Fox News Channel. Fox News continued eventually but in December Bloomberg returned on some key slots during daytime.

In November 2004, MTG launched their own historical channel Viasat History in the Nordic region. At the same time the programmes from History Channel disappeared from TV8. It was replaced by TV8's own programmes. The Fox News broadcasts were discontinued in September 2006, being replaced by simulcasts of the English version of the German news channel Deutsche Welle.

TV8 is profiled as a commercial channel with own high quality-programming, about such matters as financial and foreign news. TV8 is also showing several talkshows about domestic politics. Documentaries, mostly from the United Kingdom, are also a part of the prime time schedules, as well as high quality drama from the UK and France.

TV8 has so far attracted few viewers. In September 2007 the channel was launched in the analogue package of Com Hem, the dominant cable distributor in Sweden. This means that the number of potential viewers have increased substantially. MTG have also started to promote the channel more.

TV8 is also available through digital terrestrial broadcasts in Sweden (through subscription-based Boxer), as well as on the satellite platforms of Viasat and Canal Digital.
