= Viasat Sport 24 =

- Broadcast area: Scandinavia

Ownership
- Owner: Modern Times Group
- Sister channels: Viasat Sport 1, Viasat SportN, Viasat Sport 2, Viasat Sport 3, Viasat Golf

History
- Launched: April 24, 2005; 19 years ago
- Closed: January 2007; 18 years ago
- Replaced by: Viasat Golf

Links
- Website: Norwegian site Swedish site Danish site

Viasat Sport 24 was a Scandinavian sports channel. The channel started April 24, 2005. Viasat Sport 24 was showing several sports events in different squares on one television channel 24 hours a day complete with sports results, news and betting information. It was replaced by the new sports channel Viasat Golf in January 2007.
