= TV10 (Swedish TV channel) =

- Country: Sweden
- Broadcast area: Sweden

Programming
- Language(s): Swedish
- Picture format: 1080i (HDTV)

Ownership
- Owner: Viaplay Group
- Sister channels: TV3; TV6; TV8; V Film; V Series; V Sport

History
- Launched: 7 September 2010

Links
- Website: http://www.tv10.se/

Availability

Terrestrial
- Boxer: Channel 42

TV10 (TV tio) is a television channel owned by Viaplay Group broadcasting to Sweden. It specializes in sports and documentaries. The channel started broadcasting on 7 September 2010.

Until the start, the channel is available from several operators such as Boxer, Comhem, Telia, Tele2 and Viasat. From the beginning, the channel took over all sporting events from Viasat's other TV channels. In 2011, however, TV3 and TV6 again began broadcasting sports. Among other things, TV10 is supposed to broadcast American football from the NFL, basketball, boxing and UEFA Champions League.

The channel rebranded on 29 February 2012, under the new slogan Där kampen avgörs (where the fight is decided).

It aired the 2014 Winter Olympics alongside TV3.

== Receiving ==
The audience was strongly critical when it was decided that TV10 would broadcast the Sweden–San Marino match in September 2010 as its launch event because 70% of households at the time had access to the channel, while sister channels TV3 and TV6 took up 85% of households. At least 756,000 viewers tuned in to the channel during the match, competing against TV4's Idol and SVT1's interview with Maud Olofsson. A total of 1,120,000 people watched the channel on launch day, double the figure TV6 received in 2006.
