= V Sport (Norway) =

- Country: Norway
- Broadcast area: Norway

Ownership
- Owner: Viaplay Group
- Sister channels: V Sport Golf; V Sport Premier League

History
- Launched: 17 October 2008
- Replaced: Viasat Sport 1 Viasat Sport 2 Viasat Sport 3 Viasat Fotball; Viasat Motor; Viasat Hockey
- Former names: Viasat Sport (2008–2017); Viasport (2017–2020)

Links
- Website: www.viasport.no

V Sport is a group of Norwegian television channels owned by Viaplay Group, and a part of the pan-Nordic V Sport brand.

The channel launched on 17 October 2008, when Viasat re-tooled their sports channels in Norway and Sweden. Together with Viasat Motor, it replaced Viasat Sport 1, 2 and 3 in Norway.

When the channel launched, exclusive highlights on the channel were several football events such as the UEFA Champions League, UEFA Europa League, 2010 World Cup qualifications, the FA Cup and League Cup, as well as Formula One, NFL, boxing, cycling, GET-ligaen, and Ice Hockey World Championship.

In 2017, Viasat Sport in Norway was renamed Viasport, and in 2020, Viasport was renamed V Sport, the common brand for NENT sports channels.

== Programming ==
- V Sport Golf
  - PGA Tour
  - LPGA Tour
  - PGA European Tour
  - Ryder Cup
  - Champions Tour
  - British Open
- V Sport +
  - UEFA Champions League
  - La Liga
  - Serie A
  - French Ligue 1
  - NFL
  - NHL
  - Formula One
  - Premier League Darts
  - E-League
  - ESL One
  - Mobil 1 The Grid
  - Trans World Sport
- V Sport 1
  - UEFA Champions League
  - La Liga
  - FA Cup
  - NHL
  - Formula One
  - French Ligue 1
- V Sport 2
  - Serie A
  - EHF Champions League
  - NHL
  - La Liga
- V Sport 3
  - MotoGP
  - NASCAR
  - Supercars Championship
  - WRC
  - Mobil 1 The Grid
  - Trans World Sport
- V Sport Premier League
  - Premier League

== Logo ==
Seventh Viasat Sport logo used 2009-2017
