= Viasat Sport 2 =

Scandinavian television channel

- Broadcast area: Norway, Sweden, Denmark, Finland, Estonia, Lithuania and Latvia

Ownership
- Owner: Modern Times Group
- Sister channels: TV2 Sport Viasat Sport 1, Viasat Sport N, Viasat Sport 3, Viasat Sport 24

History
- Launched: February 1, 2004
- Closed: 16 October 2008 (Norway and Sweden); January 6, 2009 (Denmark, Finland and the Baltics)
- Replaced by: Viasat Fotboll (Sweden); Viasat Sport (Norway); Viasat Sport Baltic (Baltics)

Links
- Website: Norwegian site Swedish site Danish site

Viasat Sport 2 was a Scandinavian soccer channel. The channel started February 1, 2004 together with Viasat Sport 3. Viasat Sport 2 has the rights to Manchester United TV and Chelsea TV. Viasat Sport 2 also shows the UEFA Champions League, the Dutch Eredivise, the Danish SAS Ligaen, the French Ligue 1, the UEFA Euro Qualifications, the FA Cup, The Italian Serie A, Football League Championship, Coppa Italia and the World Cup qualifications.

The channel was available in Norway, Sweden, Denmark, Finland, Estonia, Lithuania and Latvia along with its sister channel Viasat Sport 3. On October 16, 2008, Viasat relaunched their sports channels in Norway and Sweden. Viasat Sport 2 and 3 were replaced by Viasat Fotboll (in Sweden), Viasat Sport Norway (in Norway) and Viasat Motor (in both Sweden and Norway). The channels did however continue in Denmark, Finland and the Baltics until January 6, 2009. In the Baltics, the channels were replaced by Viasat Sport Baltic, while there was no replacements in Denmark and Finland.
