= Viasat Fotball =

Norwegian television channel

Viasat Fotball was a Norwegian Pay-TV channel owned by Viasat. It is a sports channel which broadcasts games from around the world. This channel shows the FA CUP, UEFA Champions League, UEFA Europa League, Coca-Cola Championships and some League 1 matches from England. This channel broadcast 16 World Cup matches in 2010.

UEFA Champions League games are usually shown on this channel on Tuesday, while Wednesday's game will be shown on Viasat 4. If there are many matches played at the same time on Tuesday as well as Wednesday, then those matches will either be shown on Viasat Sport or Viasat Motor, but the Wednesday's game will be shown on Viasat Fotball and free-air channel Viasat4. Today the channel is a part of Viasport.
