= TV6 (Swedish TV channel) =

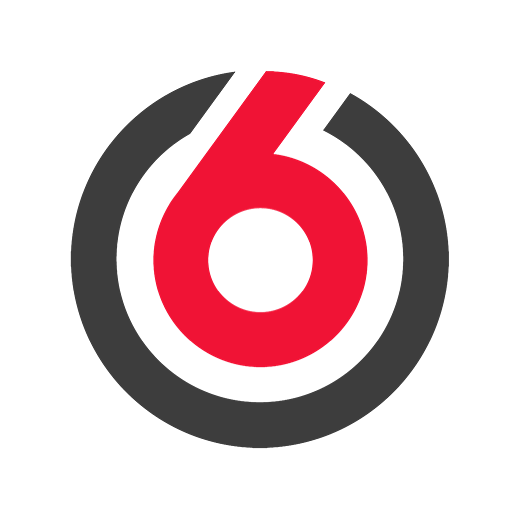
- Country: Sweden
- Broadcast area: Sweden

Programming
- Picture format: 1080i HDTV (downscaled to 16:9 576i for the SDTV feed)

Ownership
- Owner: Viaplay Group
- Sister channels: TV3; TV8; TV10; V Film; V Series; V Sport

History
- Launched: 9 May 2006
- Replaced: ZTV (on pay television)

TV6 is a Swedish television channel broadcasting owned by Viaplay Group. It has origins in the youth channel ZTV that started broadcasting in the early 1990s. In 2004, MTG started repositioning the channel by introducing sports broadcasts and other programming that mainly targeted men.

In February 2006, MTG received a license to broadcast a channel called TV6 on terrestrial television. This channel would take over virtually all ZTV programming, except the music videos that ZTV showed during the day. TV6 launched in May 2006 and simultaneously replaced ZTV in most cable networks and absorbing the channel's non music programming. When ZTV was rebranded as TV6, a new ZTV channel started that only showed music videos.

TV6 focuses on entertainment and occasional but high-profile sports broadcasts (like the UEFA Champions League), comedy, sitcoms, action, science fiction and reality programmes from the United States are popular fixtures. The sports rights held at the time of launching gave TV6 a dominant position compared to its competitor ONE Television, which launched on 24 May. Its inaugural night of broadcasting set the tone by scheduling a game from the 2006 ice hockey World Championships and the movie Terminator 3: Rise of the Machines.

Sports broadcasts are among the most popular programmes on the channel. At its launch, TV6 took over the coverage of UEFA Champions League and Formula One. The Champions League final was broadcast on 17 May 2006 and attracted 820,000 viewers, which was the highest viewing share ever recorded for a channel that wasn't one of the five major channels. In December 2007 it was revealed that TV6 would take over the coverage of the Ice Hockey World Championships from TV3 in 2008. The Ice Hockey Championships has been one of the most popular events on TV3 since they started broadcasting it in 1989.

The channel is not to be confused with another channel with the same name launched by the same company in 1994. It is now known as Viasat Nature/Crime.

TV6 (along with several other Viasat channels) are broadcast from London in the United Kingdom making them exempt from strict Swedish advertising laws. They did however agree not to advertise alcoholic beverages or broadcast advertising targeting children as part of their terrestrial license. This has however made them subject to broadcasting laws in the UK, with a broadcast of Family Guy in April 2015 breaching Ofcom rules.

After the launch in Sweden, MTG have launched TV6 in Hungary and the Baltics. TV6 Latvia was launched on 22 April 2007, TV6 Hungary on 28 January 2008, TV6 Estonia on 24 March 2008 and in September 2008, Tango TV changed its name to TV6 Lithuania. In Scandinavia its counterparts are Viasat4 in Norway, and TV3+ in Denmark. TV 3+ uses graphics similar to the TV6 channels.

HD broadcasts started on 1 November 2012.

As of 1 October 2021, TV6 is no longer free-to-air on Swedish digital terrestrial TV, because Viaplay Group decided to make TV6 focus more on live sports.

== Programming ==
Just like other channels in Sweden, programmes originally in a foreign language are subtitled into Swedish. Some of these foreign-language programmes use a Swedish title on programme guides.

- According to Jim
- Angel
- Brooklyn Nine-Nine
- Burn Notice
- Cheers
- Chuck
- COPS
- Eureka
- Family Guy
- Flash Gordon
- Grimm
- Hell on Wheels
- Highlander: The Series
- How I Met Your Mother
- I Survived a Japanese Game Show
- Knight Rider
- LA Ink
- London Ink
- Married... with Children
- Miami Ink
- NCIS: Los Angeles
- Scrubs
- Seinfeld
- Sit Down, Shut Up
- Smallville
- Stargate Atlantis
- Stargate SG-1
- Stargate Universe
- Terminator: The Sarah Connor Chronicles
- The Last Reality Show
- The Simpsons
- Two and a Half Men
- Weeds
