= Viasat Sport N =

- Country: Norway
- Broadcast area: Norway
- Headquarters: Oslo, Norway

Programming
- Language(s): Norwegian
- Picture format: 576i (SDTV, 4:3)

Ownership
- Owner: Modern Times Group and Norsk Rikskringkasting
- Sister channels: Viasat Sport Norway; Viasat Golf; Viasat Motor

History
- Launched: 29 November 2005
- Replaced: Viasat Sport 1
- Closed: 15 September 2009
- Replaced by: Viasat Fotball

Links
- Website: Official Site

Availability

Terrestrial
- RiksTV: Channel 11

Viasat Sport N ("N" as in "Norway") was the name of a former sports channel which broadcast to Norway. The channel launched on 29 November 2005, as a replacement for the then pan-Nordic Viasat Sport 1 channel in Norway.

The channel was a joint venture between Modern Times Group and Norsk Rikskringkasting. In addition to live sport coverage SportN showcased classic sport.

The channel closed down when Viasat launched Viasat Fotball on 15 September 2009.

Its technical base was located at Bjerke, Oslo.
