= Go3 Sport =

Television channel available in Baltic states

- Go3 Sport current logo
- Country: Lithuanian, Latvian, Estonian.
- Broadcast area: Estonia; Latvia; Lithuania
- Headquarters: Estonia

Programming
- Languages: Estonian, Latvian, Lithuanian
- Picture format: 16:9 (1080i HDTV)

Ownership
- Owner: UAB All Media Lithuania, SIA "All Media Latvia", AS All Media Eesti

History
- Launched: 7 January 2009
- Replaced: Viasat Sport Baltic (2009–2018); TVPlay Sports (2018–2019); TV3 Sport (2019–2023)

Links
- Website: https://go3.tv/en/live_tv/tv3-sport,live-4296024 https://go3.tv/en/live_tv/tv3-sport-2,live-4231570 https://go3.tv/en/live_tv/tv3-sport-3,live-4150367 https://go3.tv/en/live_tv/tv3-sport-open,live-2275257

Go3 Sport is a group of sports television channels available in the Baltic States. The channel was launched 7 January 2009 as Viasat Sport Baltic. Along with Viasat Golf it replaced Viasat Sport 2 and Viasat Sport 3 for viewers on the Viasat platform in Estonia, Latvia and Lithuania.

On 10 August 2018, the Viasat Sport Baltic channel changed its name to TVPlay Sports. A second channel, TVPlay Sports+, was launched in October.

On 1 December 2019, the channels TVPlay Sports changed their name to TV3 Sport and TVPlay Sports+ to TV3 Sport 2. In January 2021, TV3 Group started broadcasting a new channel, TV3 Sport Open, expanding the group's range of sports programs.

On 8 August 2023, TV3 Sport was rebranded as Go3 Sport.

As with other channels of the All Media Baltics group in the Baltic states, it switched to HD broadcasting on 26 July 2018.

The content is divided between four channels: Go3 Sport 1, Go3 Sport 2, Go3 Sport 3 and Go3 Sport Open. The fifth channel, Go3 Sport 4 (back then known as TV3 Sport 4), was closed in April 2021 due to reductions in live transmissions. However, the channel is still available on the Go3 streaming platform, in case of extra live transmissions.

== Sports rights ==
Football: (Europe) UEFA Nations League (excluding games involving Latvia), (United Nations) FIFA World Cup (Europe) UEFA Champions League, (Europe) UEFA Europa League, (Europe) UEFA Conference League, (England) Premier League, (Germany) Bundesliga, (Spain) La Liga, (Italy) Serie A, (France) Ligue 1, (Netherlands) Eredivisie, (Scotland) Scottish Premiership, (Germany) DFB Pokal, (Spain) Supercopa de España (Spain) Copa del rey (England) FA cup,

Basketball: (United States) NBA, (United States) WNBA, (Spain) Liga ACB, (Europe) Euroleague, (Europe) Eurocup, (Europe) Basketball Champions League

Hockey: (Switzerland) National League, (United States) NHL

Motorsport: (United Nations) Formula One, (United Nations) Moto GP, (United Nations) World Rally Championship, (Europe) European Rally Championship, (United Nations) Formula E, (United Nations) Speedway World Championship, (United Nations) MXGP

Tennis: (United Nations) ATP, (United Nations) WTA

Fight Sports: (United States) UFC, (United States) Zuffa Boxing, (United Kingdom) BOXXER, (Netherlands) GLORY, (Singapore) ONE

Athletics: (United Nations) Diamond League

Other: (United States) NFL, (United States) MLB

== Logos ==
August 2018 until 30 November 2019

1 December 2019 until 7 August 2023

Since 8 August 2023
