= Viaplay Group =

Pan-Nordic media and entertainment company

Viaplay Group AB
- Formerly: Nordic Entertainment Group (2018–2022)
- Type: Publicly traded Aktiebolag
- Traded as: Nasdaq Stockholm: VPLAY A, VPLAY B
- Industry: Media, radio, streaming, TV
- Founded: 1 July 2018; 8 years ago
- Headquarters: Stockholm, Sweden
- Key people: Jorgen Madsen Lindemann (CEO); Enrique Patrickson (CFO)
- Brands: Viaplay; Viaplay Select; Allente; TV3; TV6; TV8; TV10
- Revenue: ▼SEK 12,003 billion (2020)
- Operating income: ▲SEK 3,186 billion (2020)
- Net income: ▲SEK 2,226 billion (2020)
- Total assets: ▲SEK 15,949 billion (2020)
- Total equity: ▲SEK 3,236 billion (2020)
- Owner: Canal+ (29%); PPF (29%)
- Number of employees: 1,708 (2020)
- Website: www.viaplaygroup.com

Viaplay Group AB, formerly known as Nordic Entertainment Group AB (NENT Group), is a Swedish media and entertainment company headquartered in Stockholm.

The company operates the video streaming services Viaplay, advertising-funded TV and radio channels, as well as the studio production company Viaplay Studios. Viaplay Group was founded in 2018 as a spinoff from MTG. Viaplay Group's first day as a publicly traded company, on the Stockholm Stock Exchange, was on 28 March 2019.

== History ==
In March 2018, the Stockholm-headquartered entertainment company Modern Times Group (MTG) initiated a process to split into two companies by spinning off its Nordic Entertainment and MTG Studios business segments, plus Splay Networks, into a new company. This was initiated after Danish telecommunications operator TDC A/S, which had proposed to buy these assets a month earlier, was itself acquired by the Australian private equity firm Macquarie Group. Anders Jensen, previously MTG executive vice president and CEO of Nordic Entertainment, was named president and CEO of NENT Group in 2018. On 5 June, Jørgen Madsen Lindemann was named president and CEO of Viaplay Group.

NENT Group began operating separately on 1 July 2018. On 28 March 2019, shares in Nordic Entertainment Group started trading on the Nasdaq Stockholm exchange.

NENT Group took a stake in Erik Feig's Picturestart studio, along with first-look Nordic rights to its content at Picturestart's May 2019 launch.

On 5 May 2020, Pay-TV satellite platform Viasat, which was previously owned by NENT Group, merged with Canal Digital to form Allente. Although the merger meant that NENT Group and Telenor Group each own 50%, Allente TV was to be operated as an independent company. Through the merger, NENT Group's channels, including the V channels, were made available on Allente's platform. NENT Group operated Pay-TV, the Viasat satellite platform in Scandinavia and offered both in-house and third-party channels.

On 13 April 2021, the merger of Canal Digital and Viasat in Allente was completed.

On 16 September 2021, NENT Group announced the reorganisation of its studio operations, previously called NENT Studios, as Viaplay Studios. With Viaplay Studios, the company announced that the main focus of the studio operations would be content production for the Viaplay streaming platform.

On 18 May 2022, the company's shareholders approved the change of the company's name to Viaplay Group. In July 2022, Viaplay Group acquired U.K.-based sports streamer and pay TV channel operator Premier Sports for $36 million

In July 2023, Vivendi's Canal+ Group acquired a 12% minority stake in Viaplay Group for an undisclosed amount of money. In January 2024, Canal+, in association with PPF, increased its stake to 29%, planning to raise 4 billion Swedish krona (SEK) ($391 million) in order to write down 2 billion krona of debt and renegotiate terms of debt totalling an estimated 14.6 billion krona.

In November 2023, it was announced that Viaplay Group had sold its U.K.-based sports streamer and pay TV channel operator, Premier Sports, back to SSBL Limited, just a little over a year after they had become Viaplay channels.

== Company structure ==
=== The streaming service Viaplay in the Nordics ===
Viaplay Group operates the subscription video on demand (SVOD) streaming service Viaplay, which launched as Viasat OnDemand in Sweden 2007, in 2011 it was rebranded Viaplay.

Viaplay Group previously operated Viafree, an advertising video on demand (AVOD) streaming service in Denmark, Finland, Norway, and Sweden. On 29 November 2021, NENT Group announced that Viafree would soon to be part of Paramount Global (under Pluto TV), with the announcement that the said AVOD streamer will be integrated into Pluto TV on 18 May 2022.

On 1 April 2020, Viaplay launched in Iceland, the final Nordic market to launch the streaming service, making Viaplay available in all Nordic countries, which was first announced in 2019.

On 24 June 2020, Viaplay's Finnish service merged with rival Elisa Viihde Aitio, owned by Elisa, to form Elisa Viihde Viaplay.

=== Viaplay international expansion ===
At Viaplay Group's Capital Markets Day (CMD) in November 2020, the company presented its 5-year expansion plan, with targets of 10 added international markets by 2023 (for a total of 15 markets), and a total of 10.5 million subscribers, by 2025. On the following year's CMD, in 2021, Viaplay Group raised the targets to launching Viaplay on at least 16 markets by 2023 and had the subscription target raised to 12 million subscribers by 2025.

On 11 February 2021, Viaplay Group announced that the company had raised 4.35 billion krona to support the company's vision of launching Viaplay on 10 markets by the end of 2023, in line with the communicated expansion plan which was announced on the company's 2020 Capital Markets Day. Poland and the US were presented as two of the new markets, along with Estonia, Latvia, and Lithuania, which had already been announced. On 9 March 2021, Viaplay launched in the Baltics, adding Estonia, Latvia, and Lithuania.

On 20 May 2021, Viaplay Group announced the launch of Viaplay in the Netherlands in the first quarter of 2022 with exclusive Formula One, Bundesliga, and Professional Darts Corporation rights. Less than two months later, the company also announced that it had acquired rights to the English Premier League in the Netherlands. On 3 August 2021, the company launched Viaplay in Poland with premium sports rights, and announced the three first Viaplay Originals' productions in Polish – Polish Murderesses, Black Dog, and Freedom of the Swallow.

On 22 September 2021, Viaplay Group announced that Viaplay would launch in at least 16 markets by the end of 2023, including in the UK in the second half of 2022, and Canada, Germany, Austria, and Switzerland in 2023. On Viaplay Group's Capital Markets Day in November 2022, it was announced that the launches in the US and Canada would proceed as planned, while the direct-to-consumer launch in Germany, Austria, and Switzerland would wait due to the world economic situation.

In July 2022, Viaplay Group announced that they were officially acquiring Premier Sports prior to the UK launch. The channel, which also include FreeSports, would soon be rebranded as Viaplay Sports network. On 1 November 2022, the streaming service launched in the UK.

On 22 February 2023, the direct-to-consumer app launched in the US, with a clear focus on premium European content. On 7 March 2023, Viaplay launched in Canada, increasing its footprint to 13 direct-to-consumer markets.

=== Viaplay Select ===
In 2022, Viaplay Group created Viaplay Select, a branded content concept for partner platforms. In less than a year after the first deal was signed Viaplay Select had already launched on 20+ markets. Viaplay Select can be found with partners around the world, primarily in countries where the streaming service Viaplay is not available direct-to-consumer. It means that partners get access to a wide selection of Viaplay's successful series, films, and documentaries, together with curated third-party content from across the Nordic region. The content is made available in a branded Viaplay section within the partner platform.

=== Advertising funded television (Free-TV) ===
Viaplay Group operates advertising-funded channels in Scandinavia. Typically, the portfolio structure for these channels is one primary channel (TV3), and then secondary channels (TV6, TV3+, etc.) These channels generate primarily advertising revenues, and are classified as free-TV, but are encrypted and subject to decoding fees.

Networks, financed by advertising

Channel type	Sweden	Norway	Denmark	Finland
General	TV3	TV3	TV3	Viaplay TV
General secondary	TV6	TV3+	TV3+	
Supplementary	TV8; TV10	TV6	TV3 Puls; TV3 Max; TV3 Sport; See; Viaplay Xtra	

==== Viaplay TV (+) (Netherlands) ====
On 2 April 2024, Viaplay Group announced a partnership with Talpa under which channel SBS9 will be renamed Viaplay TV effective 5 April 2024. The channel will cross-promote the Viaplay streaming service by featuring broadcasts of selected sports properties from the service, such as Formula One, PDC darts, and Premier League football. On 14 March 2025, in anticipation for the start of the 2025 Formula One season, the channel split into 2, with the Viaplay TV name becoming a cable sports channel, while the former Viaplay TV channel position reverted to SBS9. Viaplay TV also launched a premium channel, Viaplay TV+, initially available on ODIDO and DELTA, starting on the same day.

=== Pay television ===
==== TV services ====
On 5 May 2020, the merger between Canal Digital and Viasat Consumer was completed, and formed Allente - the Viasat satellite platform in Scandinavia, offering both in-house and third party channels. By owning a 50% stake in the TV distributor Allente, Nordic Entertainment Group distributes its pay-TV channels including V sports, V series and V film in Scandinavia.

The sports channels available in the different Scandinavian countries differ somewhat depending on different rights held for different markets and different business agreements.

The following channels are available in each country:

Sweden	Denmark	Norway	Finland	Netherlands
V crime	V crime	V crime	V crime	Viaplay TV
V classics	V classics	V classics	V classics	Viaplay TV+
V film premiere	V film premiere	V film premiere	V film premiere	
V film action	V film action	V film action	V film action	
V film hits	V film hits	V film hits	V film hits	
V film family (SD)	V film family (SD)	V film family (SD)	V film family (SD)	
V series	V series	V series	Viaplay 1 Urheilu	
Viaplay Sport	Viaplay Sport News	V sport +	Viaplay 2 Urheilu	
V sport extra	Viaplay Sport 1	V sport 1	Viaplay 3 Urheilu	
V sport premium	Viaplay Sport 2	V sport 2	V sport premium	
V sport football	Viaplay Sport 3	V sport 3	V sport 1	
V sport vinter	V sport golf	V sport golf	V sport football	
V sport motor	V sport ultra HD	V sport ultra HD	V sport vinter	
V sport 1	V sport live (SD)	V sport live (SD)	V sport golf	
V sport golf		V sport Premier League	V sport ultra HD	
V sport ultra HD		V sport Premier League 1	V sport live (SD)	
V sport live (SD)		V sport Premier League 2		
		V sport Premier League 3		
		V sport Premier League 4		

=== Radio ===
Viaplay Group owns several radio stations in Sweden and the P4 Group in Norway:

Sweden	Norway (DAB+)
Rix FM, national network in Sweden (FM & DAB+)	P4 Lyden av Norge
Star FM, national network in Sweden (FM & DAB+)	P5 Hits
Bandit Rock, station in Stockholm (FM & DAB+)	P6 Rock
Lugna Favoriter, station in Stockholm (FM & DAB+)	P7 Klem
Power Hit Radio, station in Stockholm (DAB+)	P8 Pop
I Like Radio, streaming service in Sweden (Internet)	P9 Retro
	P10 Country
	P11 Dance
	P12 Hitmix

=== Viaplay Studios ===
Viaplay Studios
- Formerly: MTG Studios (2012–2014); The New Black OY (2008–2009); Northern Alliance Group (2009–2011); Nice Entertainment Group (2011–2018); NENT Studios (2018–2021)
- Type: Subsidiary
- Industry: Entertainment
- Headquarters: Sweden
- Parent: CapMan (2008–2013); Modern Times Group (2013–2018); Viaplay Group (2018–)
- Divisions: Viaplay Studios Norway; Viaplay Studios Sweden
- Website: www.viaplaygroup.com/brands/studios

Viaplay Studios (formerly known as MTG Studios and, later, NENT Studios) is a Sweden television production division of Viaplay Group.

==== History of Viaplay Studios ====
In December 2007, Modern Times Group announced that they had sold independent production and distributor Sonet Film to Swedish film and television production and distribution company Svensk Filmindustri.

In January 2008, Talentum announced that they had sold their Finnish film and television production company Varesvuo Partners along with their subsidiaries Moskito Television, Kaivopuiston Grillifilmi, and Angel Films to private equity fund manager CapMan. This gave the latter a film and television division. Four months later, in May of that same year, CapMan announced that they had merged Varesvuo Partners, dba, and Moskito Television with Norwegian production company Monster Media AS. This created a new Nordic television, film, and commercial production company under the name The New Black OY.

In September 2009, CapMan announced that they had acquired Swedish scripted and unscripted television production company Baluba, and that they had merged Finnish independent television production company Moskito Television with Norwegian television production company Monster Media and Danish television producer Gong to form the Scandinavian television production group named Northern Alliance Group.

In May 2011, Northern Alliance Group announced that they had brought Swedish drama production company Nice Scripted Entertainment, thus expanding their operations in Sweden.

In June 2011, Northern Alliance Group announced that they had brought Swedish leading independent television production company Titan Television, along with the latter's Norwegian television production subsidiary Limelight Film & TV.

In October 2011, Northern Alliance Group announced that they were rebranding their company by renaming it as Nordic Independent Creative Entertainment, also known as Nice, for short, after their Swedish division Nice Scripted Entertainment.

In June 2012, Nice Entertainment Group announced that they had bought Norwegian event management and branded entertainment company Playroom AS to expand their Norwegian television production operations and extend the company into the live and branded entertainment genre.

Six days later, in that same month, Modern Studios announced that they were rebranding themselves as MTG Studios and had bought a majority stake in Central and Eastern European production group Paprika Latino, with the founder of Paprika Latino, Peter Marschall, continuing as the CEO.

In September 2012, Nice Entertainment announced that they had rebranded and relaunched their Norwegian production company Limelight Film & TV as Rakett Television, with former Rubicon TV executive Andreas Hjerto heading the rebranded production company.

In May 2013, MTG Studios announced that it had made a bid to acquire British independent distribution company Digital Rights Group (DRG) from Ingenious Media, which would give the former a standalone distribution division and an expansion to the British television market. In June of that same year, MTG Studios announced that it had completed its acquisition of British independent distribution company Digital Rights Group (DRG) from Ingenious Media. MTG also announced that they had acquired a majority stake in the Oslo-based Norwegian production company Novemberfilm for an undisclosed amount.

In September 2013, MTG Studios announced that they had made an agreement to acquire Helsinki-based Scandinavian independent production and distribution group Nice Entertainment Group from CapMan, an acquisition that could expand MTG Studios' operations. Nice Entertainment Group's portfolio of productions companies—such as Strix, Monster and Rakett—would join MTG Studios' own production portfolio, with Nice's CEO Morten Aass remaining as CEO. Two months later, in November of that same year, MTG Studios announced that they had completed their acquisition of Nice Entertainment Group from CapMan following their approval of the acquisition by the Swedish and Norwegian competition authorities.

In September 2014, Nice Entertainment Group announced that they were merging two of their Danish productions companies, Strix Television Denmark and Gong, into one Danish production outfit named Strong Productions with the founder and CEO of Gong, Joachim Majholm, leaving the company.

On 29 January 2020, NENT Studios announced that they were looking to sell off their unscripted labels to focus on scripted productions. However, the attempts were interrupted by the COVID-19 pandemic. NENT Studios later decided to resume them shortly after changing the name of their British division DRG to NENT Studios UK on 30 April of that year.

In June 2021, NENT Studios announced that they had sold their British content distribution division NENT Studios UK to All3Media, with All3Media merging NENT Studios UK into their own international distribution division, All3Media International.

A month later, in July 2021, Nordic Entertainment Group announced that British-based global entertainment company Fremantle would take over NENT's unscripted operations the following month; the acquisition was completed at the end of September 2021. On 16 September 2021 (2 weeks before Fremantle acquired NENT's unscripted labels), NENT Studios was renamed Viaplay Studios and restructured to produce content for the Viaplay SVOD service, with Brain Academy and Nice Drama being merged to form Viaplay Studios Sweden and NENT Studios Animation renamed Viaplay Studios Animation.

Viaplay Studios consists of the following companies as of 30 September 2021:

- Viaplay Studios Sweden (formed from merger of Brain Academy and Nice Drama)
- Viaplay Studios Norway
- Splay One (Denmark/Finland/Norway/Sweden)
- Strix Television (Netherlands/Belgium)
- EPIQ (Denmark)
- Paprika Studios (Hungary/Czech Republic/Slovakia/Romania/Bulgaria/Slovenia/Estonia/Latvia/Lithuania)
- Viaplay Studios Animation
