= V Sport Football =

Swedish football television channel

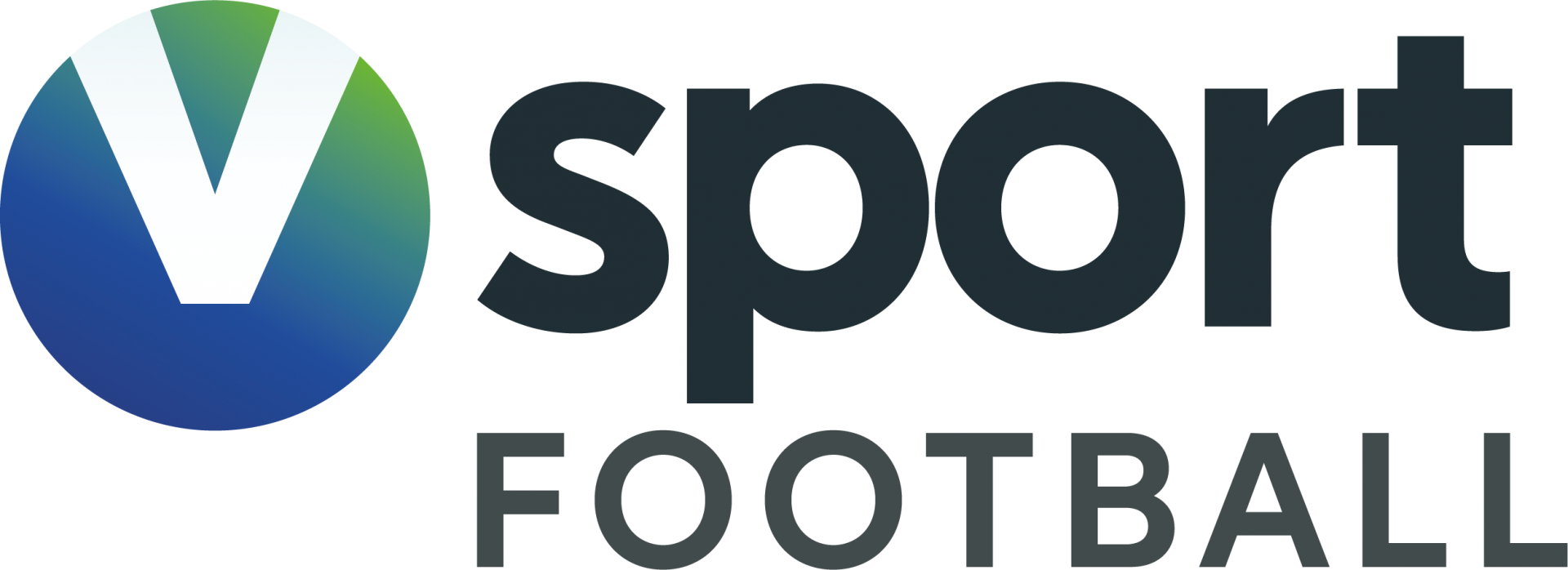
- Country: Sweden
- Broadcast area: Sweden; Finland
- Headquarters: London, United Kingdom

Programming
- Language(s): Swedish; Finnish; English
- Picture format: 16:9 (576i, SDTV), HDTV

Ownership
- Owner: Viaplay Group

History
- Launched: October 17, 2008
- Replaced: Viasat Sport 2
- Former names: Viasat Fotboll (2008–2020)

V Sport Football is a Swedish television channel dedicated to football. The channel was launched on October 17, 2008, and became the primary home to most of Viasat's football broadcasts, which at the time included UEFA Champions League, the FA Cup, Ligue 1 and Premier League.

The channel replaced the Pan-Nordic channel Viasat Sport 2 in Sweden. The launch meant that the most prestigious of the Champions League matches that had previously been broadcast on TV6 were moved to Viasat Fotboll. In 2020, the channel has been renamed from Viasat Fotboll to V Sport Football.
