= V Sport Extra =

- Broadcast area: Sweden

Ownership
- Owner: Viaplay Group

History
- Launched: 8 April 2016

Availability

Terrestrial
- Boxer: Channel 42

V Sport Extra is a television channel owned by Viaplay Group broadcasting to Sweden. It specializes in HD sports. The channel started broadcasting on 8 April 2016. The channel is sometimes broadcast as TV3 Sport without HD. On 1 June 2020 TV3 Sport HD was rebranded to V Sport Extra.
