= V Sport Motor =

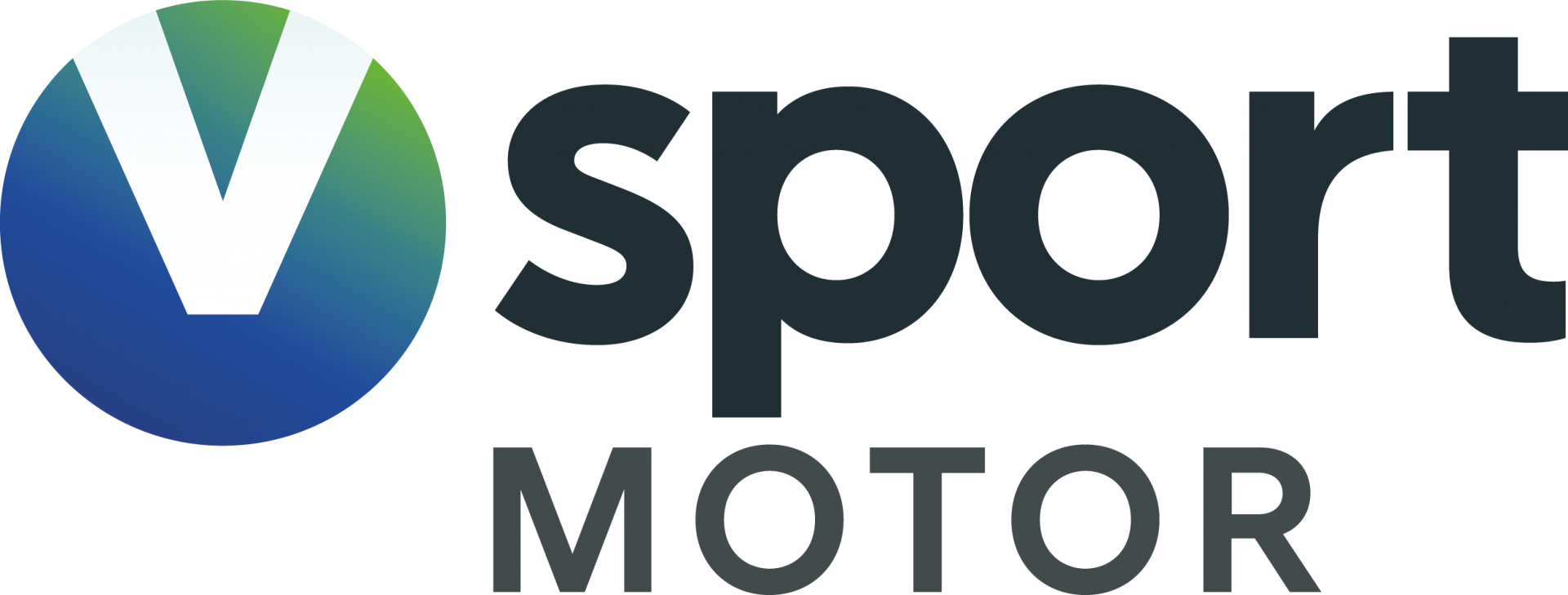
- Country: United Kingdom
- Broadcast area: Sweden
- Network: V Sport

Programming
- Picture format: 16:9 (576i, SDTV), HDTV

Ownership
- Owner: Viaplay Group
- Sister channels: V Sport Golf; V Sport Norway; V Sport Sweden; V Sport Hockey

History
- Launched: 17 October 2008
- Replaced: Viasat Sport 3
- Closed: 2017 (Norway); 2018 (Baltic countries)
- Replaced by: Viasport 3 (Norway)
- Former names: Viasat Motor (2008–2020)

Links
- Website: Viasat Motor (in Norwegian); Viasat Motor (in Swedish)

V Sport Motor is a Swedish motorsport channel that launched on 17 October 2008.

Events broadcast on the channel include Formula One, NASCAR, IndyCar, GP2, WRC, European Rallycross Championship, Formula 1 boat, Offshore Class 1, 24 hours of Nürburgring and MotoGP.

In 2020, the channel's name was changed from Viasat Motor to V Sport Motor.

== Commentators ==
- Janne Blomqvist (Sweden)
- Eje Elgh (Sweden)
- Ted Westerfors (Sweden)
- Frida Nordstrand (Sweden)
- Henka Gustafsson (Sweden)
- Hubbe Berg (Sweden)
- Johan Stigefeldt (Sweden)
- Niklas Jihde (Sweden)
- Thomas Nilsson (Sweden)
- Tobias Lyon (Sweden)
- Atle Gulbrandsen (Norway)
- Thomas Schie (Norway)
- Henning Isdal (Norway)
- Stein Pettersen (Norway)
- Stein Rømmerud (Norway)
- Dag Steinar Sundby (Norway)
