= V Sport (Sweden) =

Group of Swedish sports TV channels

V Sport 1
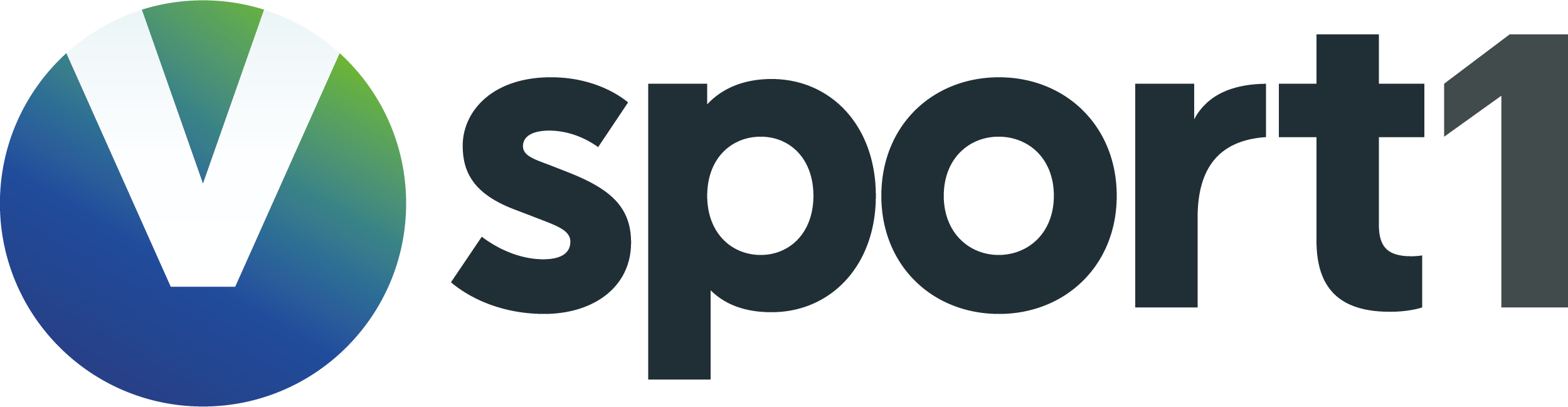
- Country: Sweden
- Broadcast area: Sweden; Finland
- Headquarters: London, United Kingdom

Programming
- Picture format: 576i (16:9 SDTV); 1080i (HDTV)

Ownership
- Owner: Viaplay Group
- Sister channels: V Sport Golf, V Sport Football, V Sport Hockey, V Sport Motor, TV10

History
- Launched: March 1, 1999
- Former names: Viasat Sport 1 (2004–2008); Viasat Sport (2008–2020)

Availability

Terrestrial
- Digita (Finland): Channel 64

V Sport is a group of Swedish sports channels owned by Viaplay Group, broadcasting from the United Kingdom and constituting a part of the pan-Nordic V Sport offering. The Swedish V Sport channels except V Sport Motor and V Sport Extra are also distributed in Finland.

== History ==
The channel was launched in 1999 as a pan-Scandinavian channel. It was launched to make use of the many sports rights in the MTG portfolio that weren't shown on TV3 and therefore were unused.

In January 2002, Viasat Sport Denmark (later replaced by TV 2 Sport) was launched and the original version would now target Sweden and Norway. This continued until SportN for Norway launched in 2005. When Viasat launched two new sports channels in 2004, Viasat Sport 2 and Viasat Sport 3, the first channel got the name "Viasat Sport 1".

In March 2008, Viasat received a licence to broadcast Viasat Sport 1 in the terrestrial network. As of August 2009, the terrestrial broadcasts were yet to begin since the infrastructure to broadcast the new channels hadn't been put in place.

On October 17, 2008, Viasat relaunched their sports channels in Sweden, Norway and Finland. This meant that Viasat Sport 1 reverted to its old name Viasat Sport. Most soccer-related programmes were moved to Viasat Fotboll. Contact sports programmes that were formerly on Viasat Sport 3 was moved to Viasat Sport.

The launch of Viasat Hockey on September 1, 2009, meant that most hockey broadcasts were moved to a separate channel, including the Ice Hockey World Championships, HockeyAllsvenskan, the NHL and KHL. Sports remaining on Viasat Sport are tennis, basketball, American football and contact sports.

Viasat acquired the rights of football's English Premier League in April 2010 and announced, that they will create a new channel for the league. It was launched on August 13, 2010, and it is called Viasat Premier League HD.

On September 7, 2010, MTG launched the new free-to-air sports channel TV10. The purpose was to take over much the sports previously broadcast on Viasat Sport, TV6 and TV8. Viasat Sport would remain, but should become an overflow channel for the other sports channels.

In 2020, all Viasat-branded channels owned by Nordic Entertainment Group have been renamed V, with Viasat Sport being renamed to V Sport accordingly.

== V Sport Premium ==
V Sport Premium
- Country: Sweden
- Broadcast area: Sweden; Finland

History
- Launched: August 13, 2010
- Former names: Viasat Sport Premium (2016–2020)

Links
- Website: Viasat Premier League HD

V Sport Premium is a high definition channel, that broadcasts only Premier League football in high definition. It broadcasts Premier League-related magazines, studio programs, live, delayed and classic matches every day around the clock in English and Swedish. The channel was created, when Viasat acquired the Premier League rights in Sweden, other Scandinavian countries and the Baltics in spring 2010. It was also planned to start broadcasts in Norway and Denmark, but Viasat resold the rights to both countries TV2 channels, which created their own versions of Premier League HD (which are actually kept on the air by Viasat).

== V Sport Football ==
V Sport Football
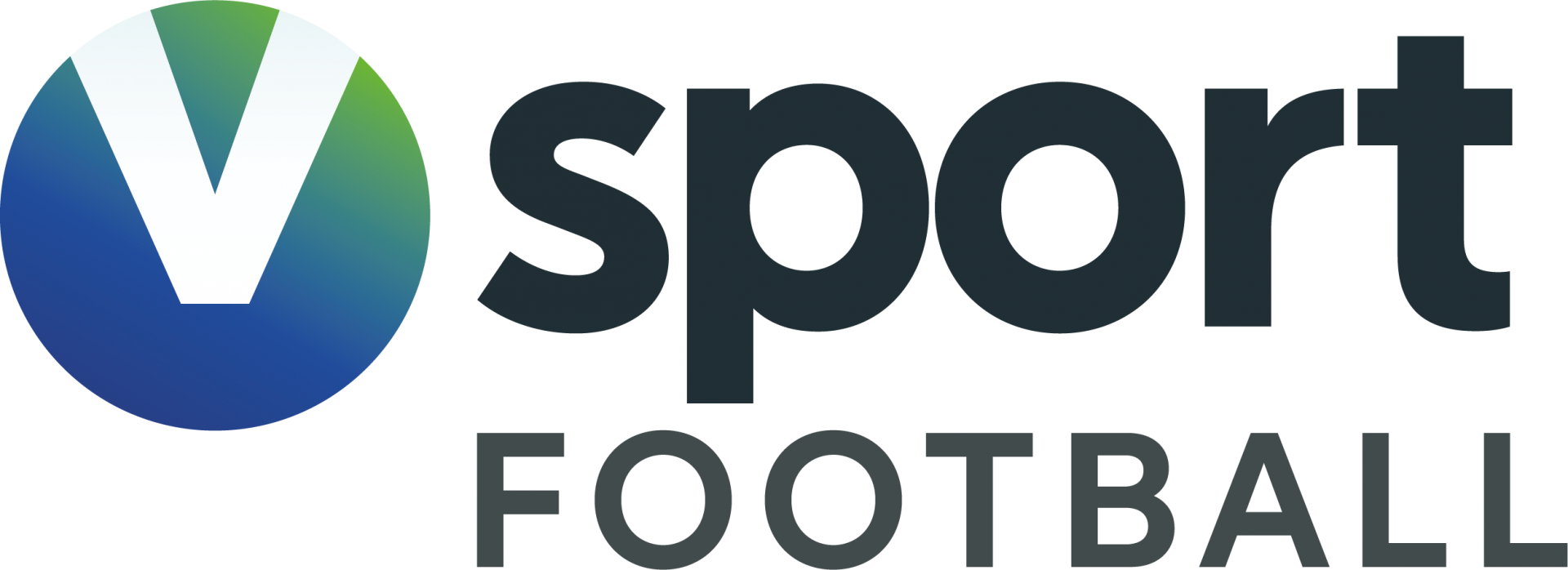
- Country: Sweden
- Broadcast area: Sweden; Finland

Programming
- Picture format: 576i (16:9 SDTV); 1080i (HDTV)

History
- Launched: October 17, 2008
- Former names: Viasat Sport 2 (2004–2008); Viasat Fotboll (2008–2020)

Links
- Website: Viasat Fotboll

V Sport Football is a channel broadcasting only football. The origins of the channel are as far away as the year 2004, when Viasat launched Northern Europe's first football channel, Viasat Sport 2. De facto, the channel still exists today, but with different programming and the name Viasat Fotboll, which has been the channel's on-the-air name since October 2008.

The channel was launched after a series of hired football experts, like Glenn Strömberg, Ola Wenström and Ola Andersson. The head of Viasat Sport channels, Per Tellander explained, that a pay channel was necessary to finance those hirings. The launch brought mixed reactions on the various forums on the Internet. Some felt that an effort was necessary, while others were annoyed at the fact, that the Champions League was moved from a free-to-air channel TV6 and existing customers had a large increase in subscription prices.

Shortly after the launch, the channel began to show a program called Avspark (literally translated to Kick-off) with Ola Wenström and Bosse Pettersson. The program showed highlights from Allsvenskan mixed with interviews of current Allsvenskan personalities in the studio. The program was on-the-air only for a year between late October 2008 and early November 2009, then the channel heads decided not to continue the program for the next season.

The channel is available in Sweden and Finland.

== V Sport Motor ==
V Sport Motor
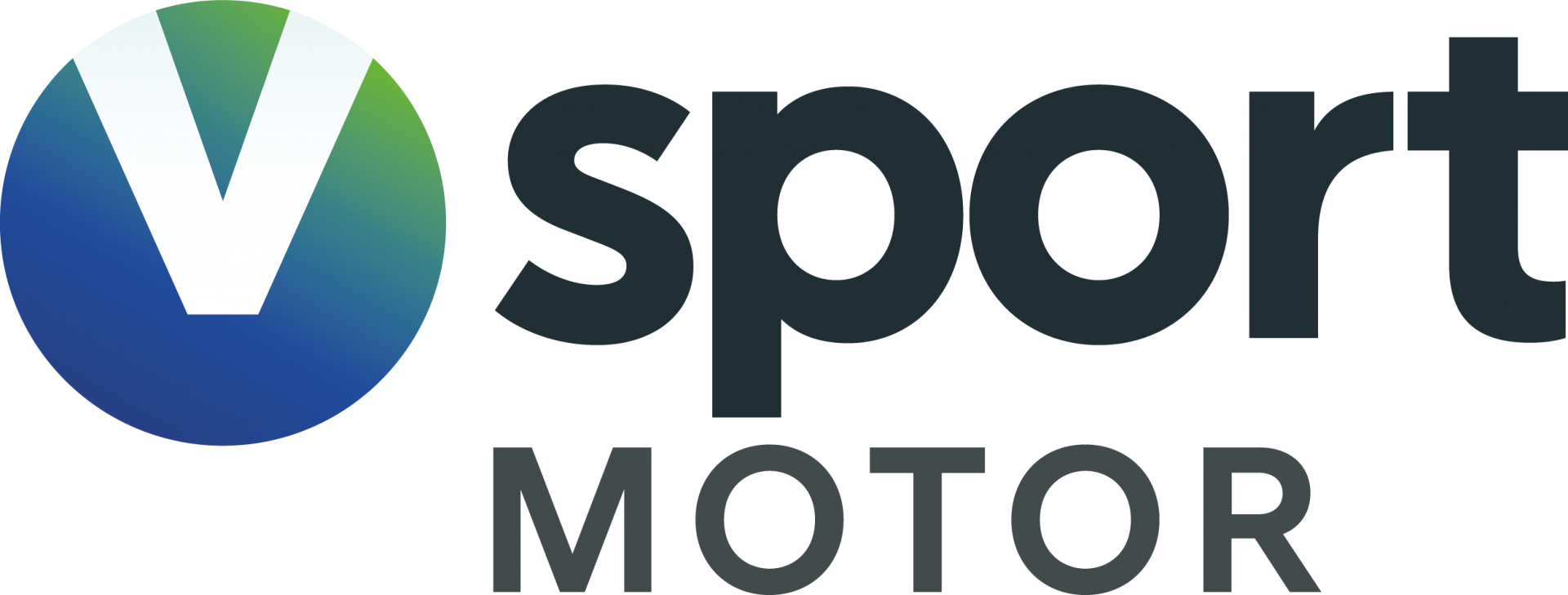
- Broadcast area: Sweden

History
- Launched: October 17, 2008
- Former names: Viasat Sport 3 (2004–2008); Viasat Motor (2008–2020)

Links
- Website: Viasat Motor

V Sport Motor broadcasts motorsports. The broadcasts include series, like MotoGP, STCC, WRC and Formula 1, which the channel has made heavy investments to. In most of the race weekends, experts Frida Nordstrand, Eje Elgh and Stefan Johansson are on track, supplemented by a studio in Stockholm led by Janne Blomqvist, who is also the commentator of the race along with Elgh. During other weekends, only Elgh is in the place. The channel has also run a news magazine dedicated to motorsport (particularly F1) since 2009 together with Sportbladet.

The channel also launched a major investment in MotoGP, which includes live broadcasts of all three classes (125, Moto2 and MotoGP). Other broadcasts include the Swedish Touring Car Championship, NASCAR and F1 Powerboat.

== V Sport Hockey ==
V Sport Hockey
- Broadcast area: Sweden; Finland

History
- Launched: September 2, 2009
- Former names: Viasat Hockey (2009–2020)

Links
- Website: Viasat Hockey

V Sport Hockey is a channel dedicated to ice hockey broadcasts.

The channel's broadcasts are focusing on NHL, KHL, HockeyAllsvenskan and the Ice Hockey World Championships and it broadcasts over 300 games per season from these leagues. The channel was announced to the public on May 7, 2009, during the year's Hockey World Championships.

== V Sport Golf ==
V Sport Golf
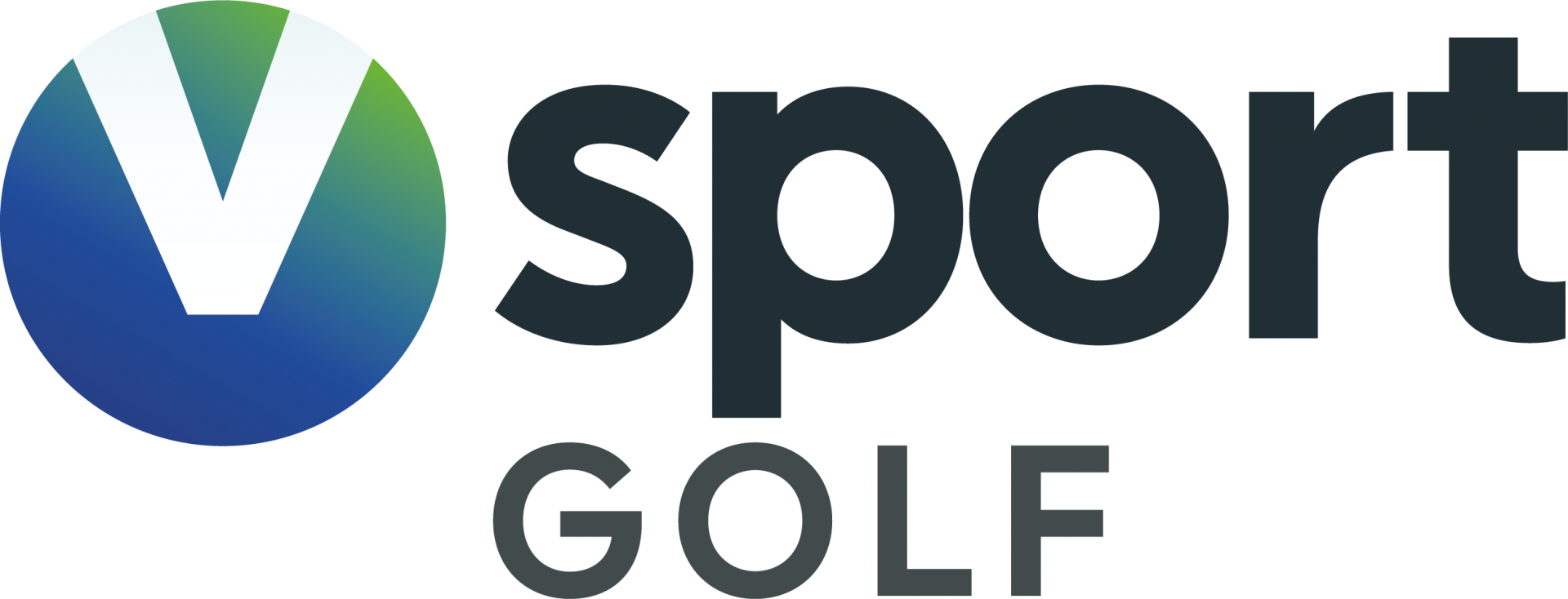
- Broadcast area: Sweden; Finland
- Headquarters: Stockholm, Sweden

History
- Launched: January 2007
- Former names: Viasat Golf (2007–2020)

Links
- Website: Viasat Golf

V Sport Golf's broadcasts consist exclusively of golf. Its rights include tours such as PGA and LPGA tours, Ryder Cup and the WGC. The Swedish broadcasts are mainly commentated by Göran Zachrisson.

The channel has arisen some controversy, when viewers were upset of being forced to buy the channel, because some of them (Lübker Golf Resort) thought, they already paid for golf broadcasts, when buying the Viasat Sport package.

== Programming rights in Sweden ==
=== Football ===
- Premier League
- UEFA Europa League
- UEFA Europa Conference League
- England national team
- EFL Championship
- English FA Cup
- EFL Cup
- Women's Super League
- Scottish Premiership
- German Bundesliga
- German Bundesliga 2
- German DFB Cup
- German Frauen-Bundesliga
- Germany national team
- Sweden national team
- Damallsvenskan
- Eredivisie

=== Ice hockey ===
- IIHF World Championships
- European Trophy
- Champions Hockey League (if organised)
- National Hockey League
- Kontinental Hockey League
- Latvian Hockey League

=== Motorsports ===
- Formula 1
- Formula 2
- Formula 3
- Porsche Supercup
- MotoGP
- Indycar
- NASCAR
- Porsche Carrera Cup Scandinavia
- F1 Powerboat World Championship

=== Handball ===
- IHF World Men's Handball Championship
- IHF World Women's Handball Championship
- European Men's Handball Championship
- European Women's Handball Championship
- EHF Champions League
- Women's EHF Champions League

=== Golf ===
- LPGA Tour
- PGA European Tour
- Ryder Cup
- Women's major championships
- Challenge Tour
- Champions Tour

=== Other sports ===
- UFC
- Euroleague of basketball
- Major League Baseball
- USFL of American football
- K-1 Grand Prix of mixed martial arts
