= V Series (Swedish TV channel) =

Scandinavian TV-series channel

- Country: Sweden
- Broadcast area: Sweden, Denmark, Norway and Finland

Ownership
- Owner: Viaplay Group
- Sister channels: V Classics; V Crime; V Film; V Sport

History
- Launched: 16 February 2009 (as TV1000 Drama); 3 March 2012 (as Viasat Film Drama); 2015 (as Viasat Series)
- Replaced: Travel Channel (on Viasat)

Links
- Website: http://www.tv1000.se/

V Series is a Swedish television channel broadcasting TV series.

The channel launched on 16 February 2009 as TV1000 Drama. The same day, all TV1000 channels in the Nordic countries got new logos and graphics. Unlike the other TV1000 channels, which were broadcasting round-the-clock, TV1000 Drama would only broadcast between 6 p.m. and 6 a.m. It timeshared with Jetix and replaced the Travel Channel on Viasat's satellite platform. The channel was rebranded as Viasat Film Drama on 3 March 2012 and time shifts with Disney Junior from 7 p.m. to 6 a.m. In 2015, the channel was rebranded as Viasat Series, the channel also replaced Viasat Crime.

Viasat Film Drama offers various genres of dramas, including costume dramas, life stories, crime and romance.

== Logos ==
TV 1000 Drama logo used 2009–2012

Viasat Film Drama logo used 2012–2015

== See also ==
- V Film
