= Viasat Sport 3 =

- Broadcast area: Norway, Sweden, Denmark, Finland, Estonia, Lithuania and Latvia

Ownership
- Owner: Modern Times Group

History
- Launched: 1 February 2004
- Closed: 16 October 2008 (Norway and Sweden); 6 January 2009 (Denmark, Finland and the Baltics)
- Replaced by: Viasat Motor (Norway and Sweden); Viasat Sport Baltic (Baltics)

Links
- Website: Norwegian site Swedish site Danish site Estonian site Latvian site Lithuanian site

Viasat Sport 3 was a Scandinavian sports channel mainly showing basketball, combat sports, auto racing and American football. The channel started on 1 February 2004 together with Viasat Sport 2. The main sports in the summer are NASCAR, Indy Racing League, Boxing, Euroleague.

Viasat Sport 3 also had the rights to the soccer club TV channel Blackburn Rovers TV.

The channel was available in Norway, Sweden, Denmark, Finland, Estonia, Lithuania and Latvia along with its sister channel Viasat Sport 2. On 16 October 2008, Viasat relaunched their sports channels in Norway and Sweden. Viasat Sport 3 was replaced by Viasat Motor in both Sweden and Norway. The channels did however continue in Denmark, Finland and the Baltics until 6 January 2009. In the Baltics, the channels were replaced by Viasat Sport Baltic, while there were no replacements in Denmark and Finland.
