= List of sports television channels =

Sports channels are television speciality channels (usually available exclusively through cable and terrestrial and satellite) broadcast sporting events, usually live, and when not broadcasting events, sports news and other related programming.

The first sports channel was from the SportsChannel networks, which went on the air in 1977 with the original SportsChannel (now MSG Plus). ESPN began broadcasting in 1979. Since then, many channels have surfaced around the world, many focusing on one sport in particular, or one region of a country, showing only their local team's games. These networks have greatly improved the availability of sports broadcasts, generating opportunities such as the ability for one person to see every single game their team plays over the course of the season.

In the United States, these channels broadcast most regular season games of major pro sports league and many other sports as well, with over the air television networks stepping in during the weekends or special events (all-star games, championships, etc.).

== Africa ==
=== Algeria ===
==== Current channels ====
- DZ Sport
- El Heddaf TV

==== Former channels ====
- Kawaliss TV
- Stade News

=== Angola ===
==== Current channels ====
- Arena X
- A Bola TV
- Benfica TV
- Canal 11
- ESPN (Africa)
  - ESPN 2
- Fast & FunBox
- FightBox
- Fight Sports
- Gametoon
- Motorvision+
- NBA Africa
- Sport TV (Africa)
- Sporting TV
- SuperSport (Angola)
  - SuperSport Blitz (including HD)
  - SuperSport Grandstand (including HD)
  - SuperSport Football Plus (including HD)
  - SuperSport Premier League (including HD)
  - SuperSport La Liga (including HD)
  - SuperSport Football (including HD)
  - SuperSport WWE (channel WWE) (including HD)
  - SuperSport Kickoff (including HD)
  - SuperSport Africa (including HD)
  - SuperSport Action (including HD)
  - SuperSport Extra (including HD)
  - SuperSport Extra 2 (including HD)
  - SuperSport Rugby (including HD)
  - SuperSport Cricket (including HD)
  - SuperSport Golf (including HD)
  - SuperSport Tennis (including HD)
  - SuperSport Motorsport (including HD)
  - SuperSport Màximo 1 (including HD)
  - SuperSport Màximo 2 (including HD)
  - SuperSport Màximo 3 (including HD)
  - SuperSport Màximo 360 (including HD)
- W-Sport
- Z Sports
  - Z Sports 1 (including HD)
  - Z Sports 2 (including HD)
  - Z Sports La Liga (including HD)

==== Former channels ====
- Extreme Sports Channel
- Fight Network
- SuperSport Variety 2
- SuperSport Variety 3
- SuperSport Variety 4
- Zap Ligue 1

=== Benin ===
† – Channel primarily televises others types of entertainment channels, only offers sports part-time

- ADO TV†
- Africa 24 Sport
- Automoto La chaîne
- Canal+ Sport (Afrique)
  - Canal+ Sport 1
  - Canal+ Sport 2
  - Canal+ Sport 3
  - Canal+ Sport 4
  - Canal+ Sport 5
- Eurosport (Afrique)
  - Eurosport 1
  - Eurosport 2
- Infosport+
- Golf Channel
- NBA Africa
- SuperSport (Benin)
  - SuperSport Football Plus (including HD)
  - SuperSport Football (including HD)
  - SuperSport Premier League (including HD)
  - SuperSport La Liga (including HD)
- Trek
- W-Sport

=== Botswana ===
- ESPN (Africa)
  - ESPN 2
- Gallop TV
  - Gallop TV 1 (horse racing TV)
  - Gallop TV 2
- MUTV (Manchester United F.C.)
- Racing 240
- Real Madrid TV
- StarTimes Sports (Botswana)
  - StarTimes Sports Arena (including HD)
  - StarTimes Sports Focus
  - StarTimes Sports Life
  - StarTimes Sports Premium (including HD)
  - StarTimes World Football (including HD)
- SuperSport (Botswana)
  - SuperSport Blitz (including HD)
  - SuperSport Grandstand (including HD)
  - SuperSport Football Plus (including HD)
  - SuperSport Premier League (including HD)
  - SuperSport La Liga (including HD)
  - SuperSport Football (including HD)
  - SuperSport Kickoff (including HD)
  - SuperSport Africa (including HD)
  - SuperSport Action (including HD)
  - SuperSport Extra (including HD)
  - SuperSport Extra 2 (including HD)
  - SuperSport WWE (channel WWE) (including HD)
  - SuperSport Rugby (including HD)
  - SuperSport Cricket (including HD)
  - SuperSport Golf (including HD)
  - SuperSport Tennis (including HD)
  - SuperSport Motorsport (including HD)
- W-Sport

==== Former channels ====
- SuperSport Africa 2
- SuperSport Variety 1
- SuperSport Variety 2
- SuperSport Variety 3
- SuperSport Variety 4

=== Cameroon ===
† – Channel primarily televises others types of entertainment channels, only offers sports part-time

- Africa 24 Sport
- Automoto La chaîne
- Canal+ Sport (Afrique)
  - Canal+ Sport 1
  - Canal+ Sport 2
  - Canal+ Sport 3
  - Canal+ Sport 4
  - Canal+ Sport 5
- CRTV Sports and Entertainment Channel†
- Dash TV Sports and Entertainment†
- Eurosport (Afrique)
  - Eurosport 1
  - Eurosport 2
- Infosport+
- Golf Channel
- NBA Africa
- SuperSport (Cameroon)
  - SuperSport Football Plus (including HD)
  - SuperSport Football (including HD)
  - SuperSport Premier League (including HD)
  - SuperSport La Liga (including HD)
- Trek
- W-Sport

=== Democratic Republic of the Congo ===
- Africa 24 Sport
- Automoto La chaîne
- Canal+ Sport (Afrique)
  - Canal+ Sport 1
  - Canal+ Sport 2
  - Canal+ Sport 3
  - Canal+ Sport 4
  - Canal+ Sport 5
- Eurosport (Afrique)
  - Eurosport 1
  - Eurosport 2
- Infosport+
- Golf Channel
- NBA Africa
- SuperSport (Democratic Republic of the Congo)
  - SuperSport Football Plus (including HD)
  - SuperSport Football (including HD)
  - SuperSport Premier League (including HD)
  - SuperSport La Liga (including HD)
- Trek
- W-Sport

=== Egypt ===
==== Current channels ====
- Al AHLY TV
- Free Sports
- Mazzika Sports
- Nile Sport
- ON Time Sports (Egypt)
  - ON Sport (including HD)
  - ON Sport Plus (including HD)
  - ON Sport Max (including HD)
- ZAMALEK TV

==== Former channels ====
- ON Sport
- Time Sports

=== Ethiopia ===
==== Current channels ====
- ETV Sport (Ethiopia)
- eSports One
- FightBox
- NBA Africa
- SuperSport (Ethiopia)
  - SuperSport Blitz (including HD)
  - SuperSport Grandstand (including HD)
  - SuperSport Football Plus (including HD)
  - SuperSport Premier League (including HD)
  - SuperSport La Liga (including HD)
  - SuperSport Football (including HD)
  - SuperSport WWE (channel WWE) (including HD)
  - SuperSport Kickoff (including HD)
  - SuperSport Africa (including HD)
  - SuperSport Action (including HD)
  - SuperSport Extra (including HD)
  - SuperSport Extra 2 (including HD)
  - SuperSport Rugby (including HD)
  - SuperSport Cricket (including HD)
  - SuperSport Golf (including HD)
  - SuperSport Tennis (including HD)
  - SuperSport Motorsport (including HD)
- W-Sport

==== Former channels ====
- Canal+ Sport (Ethiopia)
- SuperSport Liyu 1
- SuperSport Liyu 2
- SuperSport Africa 2
- SuperSport Variety 1
- SuperSport Variety 2
- SuperSport Variety 3
- SuperSport Variety 4

=== Ghana ===
==== Current channels ====
- Canal+ Sport (DStv French)
  - Canal+ Sport 2
  - Canal+ Sport 3
- ESPN (Africa)
  - ESPN 2
- GTV Sports+
- InfoSport +
- Sporty TV
- StarTimes Sports (Ghana)
  - StarTimes Sports Arena (including HD)
  - StarTimes Sports Focus
  - StarTimes Sports Life
  - StarTimes Sports Premium (including HD)
  - StarTimes World Football (including HD)
  - StarTimes Adepa
- SuperSport (Ghana)
  - SuperSport Blitz (including HD)
  - SuperSport Grandstand (including HD)
  - SuperSport Football Plus (including HD)
  - SuperSport Premier League (including HD)
  - SuperSport La Liga (including HD)
  - SuperSport Football (including HD)
  - SuperSport WWE (channel WWE) (including HD)
  - SuperSport Kickoff (including HD)
  - SuperSport Africa (including HD)
  - SuperSport Action (including HD)
  - SuperSport Extra (including HD)
  - SuperSport Extra 2 (including HD)
  - SuperSport Rugby (including HD)
  - SuperSport Cricket (including HD)
  - SuperSport Golf (including HD)
  - SuperSport Tennis (including HD)
  - SuperSport Motorsport (including HD)
- W-Sport

==== Former channels ====
- SuperSport Africa 2
- SuperSport Variety 1
- SuperSport Variety 2
- SuperSport Variety 3
- SuperSport Variety 4

=== Ivory Coast ===
- Africa 24 Sport
- Automoto La chaîne
- Canal+ Sport (Afrique)
  - Canal+ Sport 1
  - Canal+ Sport 2
  - Canal+ Sport 3
  - Canal+ Sport 4
  - Canal+ Sport 5
- Eurosport (Afrique)
  - Eurosport 1
  - Eurosport 2
- Infosport+
- Golf Channel
- NBA Africa
- SuperSport (Ivory Coast)
  - SuperSport Football Plus (including HD)
  - SuperSport Football (including HD)
  - SuperSport Premier League (including HD)
  - SuperSport La Liga (including HD)
- RTI Sport TV
- Trek
- W-Sport

=== Kenya ===
==== Current channels ====
- Azam TV Sports (Kenya)
  - Azam TV Sports 1
  - Azam TV Sports 2
  - Azam TV Sports 3
  - Azam TV Sports 4
  - Azam TV Sports 5
- Canal+ Sport (DStv French)
  - Canal+ Sport 1
  - Canal+ Sport 2
  - Canal+ Sport 3
- InfoSport +
- ESPN (Africa)
  - ESPN 2
- LFC TV
- Punch TV (Combat sport)
- Real Madrid TV
- Sporty TV
- StarTimes Sports (Kenya)
  - StarTimes Sports Arena (including HD)
  - StarTimes Sports Focus
  - StarTimes Sports Life
  - StarTimes Sports Premium (including HD)
  - StarTimes World Football (including HD)
- SuperSport (Kenya)
  - SuperSport Blitz (including HD)
  - SuperSport Grandstand (including HD)
  - SuperSport Football Plus (including HD)
  - SuperSport Premier League (including HD)
  - SuperSport La Liga (including HD)
  - SuperSport Football (including HD)
  - SuperSport WWE (channel WWE) (including HD)
  - SuperSport Kickoff (including HD)
  - SuperSport Africa (including HD)
  - SuperSport Action (including HD)
  - SuperSport Extra
  - SuperSport Extra 2
  - SuperSport Rugby
  - SuperSport Cricket
  - SuperSport Golf
  - SuperSport Tennis (including HD)
  - SuperSport Motorsport (including HD)
  - SuperSport Events (including HD)
- 365Sports Entertainment
- W-Sport

==== Former channels ====
- SuperSport Africa 2
- SuperSport Variety 1
- SuperSport Variety 2
- SuperSport Variety 3
- SuperSport Variety 4
- Zuku Sports
- Bamba Sport

=== Libya ===
- Libya Sport 1 (including HD)
- Libya Sport 2 (including HD)

=== Malawi ===
==== Current channels ====
- Azam TV Sports (Malawi)
  - Azam TV Sports 1 (including HD)
  - Azam TV Sports 2 (including HD)
  - Azam TV Sports 3 (including HD)
  - Azam TV Sports 4 (including HD)
- ESPN (Africa)
  - ESPN 2
- MUTV (Manchester United F.C.)
- Real Madrid TV
- StarTimes Sports (Malawi)
  - StarTimes Sports Arena (including HD)
  - StarTimes Sports Focus
  - StarTimes Sports Life
  - StarTimes Sports Premium (including HD)
  - StarTimes World Football (including HD)
- SuperSport (Malawi)
  - SuperSport Blitz (including HD)
  - SuperSport Grandstand (including HD)
  - SuperSport Football Plus (including HD)
  - SuperSport Premier League (including HD)
  - SuperSport La Liga (including HD)
  - SuperSport Football (including HD)
  - SuperSport WWE (channel WWE) (including HD)
  - SuperSport Kickoff (including HD)
  - SuperSport Africa (including HD)
  - SuperSport Action (including HD)
  - SuperSport Extra (including HD)
  - SuperSport Extra 2 (including HD)
  - SuperSport Rugby (including HD)
  - SuperSport Cricket (including HD)
  - SuperSport Golf (including HD)
  - SuperSport Tennis (including HD)
  - SuperSport Motorsport (including HD)
- W-Sport

==== Former channels ====
- SuperSport Africa 2
- SuperSport Variety 1
- SuperSport Variety 2
- SuperSport Variety 3
- SuperSport Variety 4

=== Madagascar ===
- Automoto La chaîne
- beIN Sports (France & Réunion)
  - beIN Sports 1
  - beIN Sports 2
  - beIN Sports 3
  - beIN Sports Max 4
  - beIN Sports Max 5
- Canal+ Sport (France & Réunion)
  - Canal+ Sport 1
  - Canal+ Sport 2
  - Canal+ Sport 3
  - Canal+ Sport 4
  - Canal+ Sport 5
  - Canal+ Sport 360
  - Canal+ Foot
  - Canal+ Premier League
  - Canal+ Live (1-18)
- Equidia
- Equidia 2
- Eurosport (France & Réunion)
  - Eurosport 1
  - Eurosport 2
- Infosport+
- La Chaîne L'Équipe
- Punch TV (Combat sport)
- RMC Sport (France & Réunion)
  - RMC Sport 1
  - RMC Sport Live 2
- SuperSport (Madagascar)
  - SuperSport Football Plus (including HD)
  - SuperSport Football (including HD)
  - SuperSport Premier League (including HD)
  - SuperSport La Liga (including HD)
- Trek

=== Mauritius ===
- Automoto La chaîne
- beIN Sports (France & Réunion)
  - beIN Sports 1
  - beIN Sports 2
  - beIN Sports 3
  - beIN Sports Max 4
  - beIN Sports Max 5
- Canal+ Sport (France & Réunion)
  - Canal+ Sport 1
  - Canal+ Sport 2
  - Canal+ Sport 3
  - Canal+ Sport 4
  - Canal+ Sport 5
  - Canal+ Sport 360
  - Canal+ Foot
  - Canal+ Premier League
  - Canal+ Live (1-18)
- Equidia
- Equidia 2
- Eurosport (France & Réunion)
  - Eurosport 1
  - Eurosport 2
- MBC 11 (Mauritius Sports)
- RMC Sport (France & Réunion)
  - RMC Sport 1
  - RMC Sport Live 2
- SuperSport (Mauritius)
  - SuperSport Football Plus (including HD)
  - SuperSport Football (including HD)
  - SuperSport Premier League (including HD)
  - SuperSport La Liga (including HD)
- Trek
- W-Sport

=== Morocco ===
- Arryadia

=== Mozambique ===
==== Current channels ====
- Arena X
- A Bola TV
- Benfica TV
- Canal 11
- ESPN (Africa)
  - ESPN 2
- Fast & FunBox
- FightBox
- Gametoon
- Motorvision+
- NBA Africa
- Sport TV (Africa)
- Sporting TV
- StarTimes Sports (Mozambique)
  - StarTimes Sports Arena (including HD)
  - StarTimes Sports Focus
  - StarTimes Sports Life
  - StarTimes Sports Mania (including HD)
  - StarTimes Sports Mania 2
  - StarTimes Sports Premium (including HD)
  - StarTimes World Football (including HD)
- SuperSport (Mozambique)
  - SuperSport Blitz (including HD)
  - SuperSport Grandstand (including HD)
  - SuperSport Football Plus (including HD)
  - SuperSport Premier League (including HD)
  - SuperSport La Liga (including HD)
  - SuperSport Football (including HD)
  - SuperSport WWE (channel WWE) (including HD)
  - SuperSport Kickoff (including HD)
  - SuperSport Africa (including HD)
  - SuperSport Action (including HD)
  - SuperSport Extra (including HD)
  - SuperSport Extra 2 (including HD)
  - SuperSport Rugby (including HD)
  - SuperSport Cricket (including HD)
  - SuperSport Golf (including HD)
  - SuperSport Tennis (including HD)
  - SuperSport Motorsport (including HD)
  - SuperSport Màximo 1 (including HD)
  - SuperSport Màximo 2 (including HD)
  - SuperSport Màximo 3 (including HD)
  - SuperSport Màximo 360 (including HD)
- W-Sport
- Z Sports
  - Z Sports 1 (including HD)
  - Z Sports 2 (including HD)
  - Z Sports La Liga (including HD)

==== Former channels ====
- Extreme Sports Channel
- Fight Network
- SuperSport Variety 2
- SuperSport Variety 3
- SuperSport Variety 4
- Zap Ligue 1

=== Namibia ===
==== Current channels ====
- ESPN (Africa)
  - ESPN 2
- Gallop TV
  - Gallop TV 1 (horse racing TV)
  - Gallop TV 2
- MUTV (Manchester United F.C.)
- Racing 240
- Real Madrid TV
- StarTimes Sports (Namibia)
  - StarTimes Sports Arena (including HD)
  - StarTimes Sports Focus
  - StarTimes Sports Life
  - StarTimes Sports Premium (including HD)
  - StarTimes World Football (including HD)
- SuperSport (Namibia)
  - SuperSport Blitz (including HD)
  - SuperSport Grandstand (including HD)
  - SuperSport Football Plus (including HD)
  - SuperSport Premier League (including HD)
  - SuperSport La Liga (including HD)
  - SuperSport Football (including HD)
  - SuperSport Kickoff (including HD)
  - SuperSport Africa (including HD)
  - SuperSport Action (including HD)
  - SuperSport Extra (including HD)
  - SuperSport Extra 2 (including HD)
  - SuperSport WWE (channel WWE) (including HD)
  - SuperSport Rugby (including HD)
  - SuperSport Cricket (including HD)
  - SuperSport Golf (including HD)
  - SuperSport Tennis (including HD)
  - SuperSport Motorsport (including HD)
- W-Sport

==== Former channels ====
- SuperSport Africa 2
- SuperSport Variety 1
- SuperSport Variety 2
- SuperSport Variety 3
- SuperSport Variety 4

=== Nigeria ===
==== Current channels ====
- Africasport TV
- Canal+ Sport (Afrique)
  - Canal+ Sport 1
  - Canal+ Sport 2
  - Canal+ Sport 3
  - Canal+ Sport 4
  - Canal+ Sport 5
- ESPN (Africa)
  - ESPN 2
- FS Sports (Nigeria)
  - FS Football
- NTA Sports 24
- Our Sports
- Sporty TV
- StarTimes Sports (Nigeria)
  - StarTimes Sports Arena (including HD)
  - StarTimes Beta Sports
  - StarTimes Sports Focus
  - StarTimes Sports Life
  - StarTimes Sports Premium

(including HD)

  - StarTimes World Football (including HD)
- SuperSport (Nigeria)
  - SuperSport Blitz (including HD)
  - SuperSport Grandstand (including HD)
  - SuperSport Football Plus (including HD)
  - SuperSport Premier League (including HD)
  - SuperSport La Liga (including HD)
  - SuperSport Football (including HD)
  - SuperSport WWE (channel WWE) (including HD)
  - SuperSport Kickoff (including HD)
  - SuperSport Africa (including HD)
  - SuperSport Action (including HD)
  - SuperSport Extra (including HD)
  - SuperSport Extra 2 (including HD)
  - SuperSport Rugby (including HD)
  - SuperSport Cricket (including HD)
  - SuperSport Golf (including HD)
  - SuperSport Tennis (including HD)
  - SuperSport Motorsport (including HD)
  - SuperSport Events (including HD)
  - SuperSport Ott (1-8) (including HD)
- Talent Sport
- W-Sport

==== Former channels ====
- Kwese Free Sports
- SuperSport Africa 2
- SuperSport Variety 1
- SuperSport Variety 2
- SuperSport Variety 3
- SuperSport Variety 4

=== Réunion ===
- Automoto La chaîne
- beIN Sports (France & Réunion)
  - beIN Sports 1
  - beIN Sports 2
  - beIN Sports 3
  - beIN Sports Max 4
  - beIN Sports Max 5
- Canal+ Sport (France & Réunion)
  - Canal+ Sport 1
  - Canal+ Sport 2
  - Canal+ Sport 3
  - Canal+ Sport 4
  - Canal+ Sport 5
  - Canal+ Sport 360
  - Canal+ Foot
  - Canal+ Premier League
  - Canal+ Live (1-18)
- Cheval TV (horse racing)
- Equidia
- Equidia 2
- Eurosport (France & Réunion)
  - Eurosport 1
  - Eurosport 2
- Golf+
- Infosport+
- La Chaîne L'Équipe
- Punch TV (Combat sport)
- RMC Sport (France & Réunion)
  - RMC Sport 1
  - RMC Sport Live 2
- SuperSport (Réunion)
  - SuperSport Football Plus (including HD)
  - SuperSport Football (including HD)
  - SuperSport Premier League (including HD)
  - SuperSport La Liga (including HD)
- Trek
- W-Sport

=== Rwanda ===
==== Current channels ====
- Canal+ Sport (Afrique)
  - Canal+ Sport 1
  - Canal+ Sport 2
  - Canal+ Sport 3
  - Canal+ Sport 4
  - Canal+ Sport 5
- ESPN (Africa)
  - ESPN 2
- Magic Sports
- MUTV (Manchester United F.C.)
- Real Madrid TV
- StarTimes Sports (Rwanda)
  - StarTimes Sports Arena (including HD)
  - StarTimes Sports Focus
  - StarTimes Sports Life
  - StarTimes Sports Premium (including HD)
  - StarTimes World Football (including HD)
- SuperSport (Rwanda)
  - SuperSport Blitz (including HD)
  - SuperSport Grandstand (including HD)
  - SuperSport Football Plus (including HD)
  - SuperSport Premier League (including HD)
  - SuperSport La Liga (including HD)
  - SuperSport Football (including HD)
  - SuperSport WWE (channel WWE) (including HD)
  - SuperSport Kickoff (including HD)
  - SuperSport Africa (including HD)
  - SuperSport Action (including HD)
  - SuperSport Extra (including HD)
  - SuperSport Extra 2 (including HD)
  - SuperSport Rugby (including HD)
  - SuperSport Cricket (including HD)
  - SuperSport Golf (including HD)
  - SuperSport Tennis (including HD)
  - SuperSport Motorsport (including HD)
- W-Sport

==== Former channels ====
- SuperSport Africa 2
- SuperSport Variety 1
- SuperSport Variety 2
- SuperSport Variety 3
- SuperSport Variety 4

=== South Africa ===
==== Current channels ====
† – Channel primarily televises others types of news channels, only offers sports part-time

- ESPN (Africa)
  - ESPN 2
- Racing 240
- SABC Sport
- Sporty TV
- SuperSport (South Africa)
  - SuperSport Blitz (including HD)
  - SuperSport Grandstand (including HD)
  - SuperSport PSL (including HD)
  - SuperSport Premier League (including HD)
  - SuperSport La Liga (including HD)
  - SuperSport Football (including HD)
  - SuperSport Football Plus (including HD)
  - SuperSport Kickoff (including HD)
  - SuperSport Africa (including HD)
  - SuperSport Action (including HD)
  - SuperSport Extra (including HD)
  - SuperSport Rugby (including HD)
  - SuperSport Cricket (including HD)
  - SuperSport Golf (including HD)
  - SuperSport Tennis (including HD)
  - SuperSport Motorsport (including HD)
  - SuperSport School (including HD)
  - SuperSport Extra 2 (including HD)
  - SuperSport WWE (channel WWE) (including HD)
  - SuperSport Màximo 1 (including HD)
  - SuperSport CSN (including HD)
  - SuperSport Play (including HD)
  - SuperSport Select 1 (including HD)
  - SuperSport Events (including HD)
  - SuperSport Ott (1-8) (including HD)
- W-Sport

==== Former channels ====
- e.tv News & Sport†
- Fuel TV
- Ginx TV
- TellyTrack
- StarTimes Sports Arena (including HD)
- StarTimes Beta Sports
- StarTimes Sports Focus
- StarTimes Sports Life
- StarTimes Sports Mania (including HD)
- StarTimes Sports Premium (including HD)
- StarTimes World Football (including HD)
- SuperSport Variety 1
- SuperSport Variety 2
- SuperSport Variety 3
- SuperSport Variety 4

=== Sudan ===
- Al-Hilal TV
- Merrikkh TV
- Sudan Sports

=== Tanzania ===
==== Current channels ====
- Azam TV Sports (Tanzania)
  - Azam TV Sports 1 (including HD)
  - Azam TV Sports 2 (including HD)
  - Azam TV Sports 3 (including HD)
  - Azam TV Sports 4 (including HD)
- ESPN (Africa)
  - ESPN 2
- MUTV (Manchester United F.C.)
- Real Madrid TV
- StarTimes Sports (Tanzania)
  - StarTimes Sports Arena (including HD)
  - StarTimes Sports Focus
  - StarTimes Sports Life
  - StarTimes Sports Premium (including HD)
  - StarTimes World Football (including HD)
- SuperSport (Tanzania)
  - SuperSport Blitz (including HD)
  - SuperSport Grandstand (including HD)
  - SuperSport Football Plus (including HD)
  - SuperSport Premier League (including HD)
  - SuperSport La Liga (including HD)
  - SuperSport Football (including HD)
  - SuperSport WWE (channel WWE) (including HD)
  - SuperSport Kickoff (including HD)
  - SuperSport Africa (including HD)
  - SuperSport Action (including HD)
  - SuperSport Extra (including HD)
  - SuperSport Extra 2 (including HD)
  - SuperSport Rugby (including HD)
  - SuperSport Cricket (including HD)
  - SuperSport Golf (including HD)
  - SuperSport Tennis (including HD)
  - SuperSport Motorsport (including HD)
- W-Sport

==== Former channels ====
- SuperSport Africa 2
- SuperSport Variety 1
- SuperSport Variety 2
- SuperSport Variety 3
- SuperSport Variety 4

=== Togo ===
- Africa 24 Sport
- Automoto La chaîne
- Canal+ Sport (Afrique)
  - Canal+ Sport 1
  - Canal+ Sport 2
  - Canal+ Sport 3
  - Canal+ Sport 4
  - Canal+ Sport 5
- Eurosport (Afrique)
  - Eurosport 1
  - Eurosport 2
- Infosport+
- Golf Channel
- NBA Africa
- New World Sport (Togo)
  - NW Sport 1
  - NW Sport 2
  - NW Sport 3
  - NW Sport 4
  - NW Sport 5
  - NW Sport 6
  - NW Sport 7
- SuperSport (Togo)
  - SuperSport Football Plus (including HD)
  - SuperSport Football (including HD)
  - SuperSport Premier League (including HD)
  - SuperSport La Liga (including HD)
- Trek
- W-Sport

=== Tunisia ===
- Nessma Sport

=== Uganda ===
==== Current channels ====
- Azam TV Sports (Uganda)
  - Azam TV Sports 1 (including HD)
  - Azam TV Sports 2 (including HD)
  - Azam TV Sports 3 (including HD)
  - Azam TV Sports 4 (including HD)
- ESPN (Africa)
  - ESPN 2
- MUTV (Manchester United F.C.)
- NBS Sports
- Real Madrid TV
- StarTimes Sports (Uganda)
  - StarTimes Sports Arena (including HD)
  - StarTimes Sports Focus
  - StarTimes Sports Life
  - StarTimes Sports Premium (including HD)
  - StarTimes World Football (including HD)
- SuperSport (Uganda)
  - SuperSport Blitz (including HD)
  - SuperSport Grandstand (including HD)
  - SuperSport Football Plus (including HD)
  - SuperSport Premier League (including HD)
  - SuperSport La Liga (including HD)
  - SuperSport Football (including HD)
  - SuperSport WWE (channel WWE) (including HD)
  - SuperSport Kickoff (including HD)
  - SuperSport Africa (including HD)
  - SuperSport Action (including HD)
  - SuperSport Extra (including HD)
  - SuperSport Extra 2 (including HD)
  - SuperSport Rugby (including HD)
  - SuperSport Cricket (including HD)
  - SuperSport Golf (including HD)
  - SuperSport Tennis (including HD)
  - SuperSport Motorsport (including HD)
- W-Sport

==== Former channels ====
- Kwese Sports
- Zuku Sports
- SuperSport Africa 2
- SuperSport Variety 1
- SuperSport Variety 2
- SuperSport Variety 3
- SuperSport Variety 4

=== Zambia ===
==== Current channels ====
- ESPN (Africa)
  - ESPN 2
- Gallop TV
  - Gallop TV 1 (horse racing TV)
  - Gallop TV 2
- MUTV (Manchester United F.C.)
- Racing 240
- Real Madrid TV
- StarTimes Sports (Zambia)
  - StarTimes Sports Arena (including HD)
  - StarTimes Sports Focus
  - StarTimes Sports Life
  - StarTimes Sports Premium (including HD)
  - StarTimes World Football (including HD)
- Sun Sports TV
- SuperSport (Zambia)
  - SuperSport Blitz (including HD)
  - SuperSport Grandstand (including HD)
  - SuperSport Football Plus (including HD)
  - SuperSport Premier League (including HD)
  - SuperSport La Liga (including HD)
  - SuperSport Football (including HD)
  - SuperSport Africa (including HD)
  - SuperSport Kickoff (including HD)
  - SuperSport Action (including HD)
  - SuperSport Extra (including HD)
  - SuperSport Extra 2 (including HD)
  - SuperSport WWE (channel WWE) (including HD)
  - SuperSport Rugby (including HD)
  - SuperSport Cricket (including HD)
  - SuperSport Golf (including HD)
  - SuperSport Tennis (including HD)
  - SuperSport Motorsport (including HD)
- W-Sport

==== Former channels ====
- SuperSport Africa 2
- SuperSport Variety 1
- SuperSport Variety 2
- SuperSport Variety 3
- SuperSport Variety 4

=== Zimbabwe ===
==== Current channels ====
- Azam TV Sports (Zimbabwe)
  - Azam TV Sports 1 (including HD)
  - Azam TV Sports 2 (including HD)
  - Azam TV Sports 3 (including HD)
  - Azam TV Sports 4 (including HD)
- ESPN (Africa)
  - ESPN 2
- Gallop TV
  - Gallop TV 1 (horse racing TV)
  - Gallop TV 2
- MUTV (Manchester United F.C.)
- Racing 240
- Real Madrid TV
- StarTimes Sports (Zimbabwe)
  - StarTimes Sports Arena (including HD)
  - StarTimes Sports Focus
  - StarTimes Sports Life
  - StarTimes Sports Premium (including HD)
  - StarTimes World Football (including HD)
- SuperSport (Zimbabwe)
  - SuperSport Blitz (including HD)
  - SuperSport Grandstand (including HD)
  - SuperSport Football Plus (including HD)
  - SuperSport Premier League (including HD)
  - SuperSport La Liga (including HD)
  - SuperSport Football (including HD)
  - SuperSport Kickoff (including HD)
  - SuperSport Africa (including HD)
  - SuperSport Action (including HD)
  - SuperSport Extra (including HD)
  - SuperSport Extra 2 (including HD)
  - SuperSport WWE (channel WWE) (including HD)
  - SuperSport Rugby (including HD)
  - SuperSport Cricket (including HD)
  - SuperSport Golf (including HD)
  - SuperSport Tennis (including HD)
  - SuperSport Motorsport (including HD)
- W-Sport

==== Former channels ====
- SuperSport Africa 2
- SuperSport Variety 1
- SuperSport Variety 2
- SuperSport Variety 3
- SuperSport Variety 4

== Americas ==
=== Argentina ===
- América Sports
- AM Sports (America Sports)
- Cable Sport (Argentina)
  - Cable Sport
  - Cable Sport 2
  - Cable Sport 3
  - Cable Sport 4 (including HD)
  - Cable Sport 5 (including HD)
  - Cable Sport Plus
  - Cable Max
  - Cable Max 2
  - Cable Max 3
  - Cable Max 4
  - Cable Max 5
  - Cable Max Plus
- CMA Plus
- DeporTV
- DSports (Argentina)
  - DSports 2
  - DSports +
- Discovery Turbo
- El Garage TV
- ESPN (Argentina)
  - ESPN 2 (including HD)
  - ESPN 3 (including HD)
  - ESPN 4 (including HD)
  - ESPN Extra (including HD)
  - ESPN Premium (including HD)
- Fox Sports (Argentina)
  - Fox Sports 2 (including HD)
  - Fox Sports 3 (including HD)
- Gala Sport (exclusive of VCC)
- Golf Channel
- Gol TV (Latin American)
- Multideporte (exclusive of Multicanal)
- Movistar Deportes (Argentina)
  - Movistar Deportes 2
  - Movistar Deportes 3
  - Movistar Deportes 4
  - Movistar Deportes Plus
  - Movistar Max (five channels)
- Poker Sports
- PADMANI TV
- Telecanal Plus
- Telesistema Plus
- TNT Sports Premium (Argentina)
- TVC Plus
- TyC Sports (Argentina)
  - TyC Sports
  - TyC Sports 2
  - TyC Max (main pay-per-view signal)
  - TyC Max 2 (second pay-per-view signal)
  - TyC Max 3
  - TyC Max 4
  - TyC Max 5
  - TyC Max Plus
- 365 Sports

=== Bahamas ===
- DSports (Bahamas)
  - DSports 2
  - DSports +
- ESPN (Caribbean)
  - ESPN 2
- Fox Sports (Caribbean)
  - Fox Sports 1
  - Fox Sports 2
  - Fox Sports Racing
  - Fox Soccer Plus
- Flow Sports (Bahamas)
  - Flow Sports 1
  - Flow Sports 2
  - Flow Sports Extra 3
  - Flow Sports Extra 4
  - Flow Sports Extra 5
  - Flow Sports Extra 6
  - Flow Sports Extra 7
  - Flow Sports Extra 8
  - Flow Sports Premier
- Rush Sports (Bahamas)
  - Rush Sports 2
- Sports Max (Bahamas)
  - Sports Max 2
  - Sports Max Plus
  - Sports Max Cricket

=== Barbados ===
- DSports (Barbados)
  - DSports 2
  - DSports +
- ESPN (Caribbean)
  - ESPN 2
- Fox Sports (Caribbean)
  - Fox Sports 1
  - Fox Sports 2
  - Fox Sports Racing
  - Fox Soccer Plus
- Flow Sports (Barbados)
  - Flow Sports 1
  - Flow Sports 2
  - Flow Sports Extra 3
  - Flow Sports Extra 4
  - Flow Sports Extra 5
  - Flow Sports Extra 6
  - Flow Sports Extra 7
  - Flow Sports Extra 8
  - Flow Sports Premier
- Rush Sports (Barbados)
  - Rush Sports 2
- Sports Max (Barbados)
  - Sports Max 2
  - Sports Max Plus
  - Sports Max Cricket

=== Belize ===
- DSports (Belize)
  - DSports 2
  - DSports +
- ESPN (Caribbean)
  - ESPN 2
- Fox Sports (Caribbean)
  - Fox Sports 1
  - Fox Sports 2
  - Fox Sports Racing
  - Fox Soccer Plus
- Flow Sports (Belize)
  - Flow Sports 1
  - Flow Sports 2
  - Flow Sports Extra 3
  - Flow Sports Extra 4
  - Flow Sports Extra 5
  - Flow Sports Extra 6
  - Flow Sports Extra 7
  - Flow Sports Extra 8
  - Flow Sports Premier
- Rush Sports (Belize)
  - Rush Sports 2
- Sports Max (Belize)
  - Sports Max 2
  - Sports Max Plus
  - Sports Max Cricket

=== Bermuda ===
- DSports (Bermuda)
  - DSports 2
  - DSports +
- ESPN (Caribbean)
  - ESPN 2
- Fox Sports (Caribbean)
  - Fox Sports 1
  - Fox Sports 2
  - Fox Sports Racing
  - Fox Soccer Plus
- Flow Sports (Bermuda)
  - Flow Sports 1
  - Flow Sports 2
  - Flow Sports Extra 3
  - Flow Sports Extra 4
  - Flow Sports Extra 5
  - Flow Sports Extra 6
  - Flow Sports Extra 7
  - Flow Sports Extra 8
  - Flow Sports Premier
- Rush Sports (Bermuda)
  - Rush Sports 2
- Sports Max (Bermuda)
  - Sports Max 2
  - Sports Max Plus
  - Sports Max Cricket

=== Bolivia ===
==== Current channels ====
- DSports (Bolivia)
  - DSports 2
  - DSports +
- Entel Gol (Bolivia)
  - Entel Gol+
- ESPN (Latin America)
  - ESPN 2 (including HD)
  - ESPN 3 (including HD)
  - ESPN 4 (including HD)
  - ESPN 5 (including HD)
  - ESPN 6 (including HD)
  - ESPN 7 (including HD)
- Facetas Televisión
- Fox Sports (Latin America)
  - Fox Sports 2 (including HD)
  - Fox Sports 3 (including HD)
- FútbolCanal
- Gol TV (Latin American)
- Movistar Deportes (Bolivia)
  - Movistar Deportes 2
  - Movistar Deportes 3
  - Movistar Deportes 4
  - Movistar Deportes Plus
  - Movistar Max (five channels)
- Tigo Sports (Bolivia)
  - Tigo Sports 2
  - Tigo Sports 3
  - Tigo Sports 4
  - Tigo Sports 5
  - Tigo Sporgs Plus
  - Tigo Sports Max (five channels)

==== Former channels ====
- Bolivia TV Deportes

=== Brazil ===
==== Current channels ====
† – Channel primarily televises others types of news or entertainment channels, only offers sports part-time

National sports networks

- BandSports
- CazéTV
- Combate (Brazil)
  - Combate Global (PPV of MMA and boxing signal)
- ESPN (Brazil)
  - ESPN 2 (including HD)
  - ESPN 3 (including HD)
  - ESPN 4 (including HD)
  - ESPN 5 (including HD)
  - ESPN 6 (including HD)
- Golf Channel
- Ge TV
- N Sports
- Premiere (Brazil)
  - Premiere 1
  - Premiere 2
  - Premiere 3
  - Premiere 4
  - Premiere 5
  - Premiere 6
  - Premiere 7
  - Premiere 8
  - Premiere 9
- SporTV (Brazil)
  - SporTV 2
  - SporTV 3
  - SporTV 4K
- SportyNet+
  - SportyNet+2
  - SportyNet+3
- TNT Sports (Brazil)
  - TNT†
  - Space†
- Woohoo
- Xsports

==== Former channels ====
- Fox Sports (Brazil) (including HD)
- Fox Sport 2 (including HD)
- Fox Sport 3 (including HD)

=== Canada ===
==== Current channels ====
National sports networks † – Channel primarily televises others types of news or entertainment channels, only offers sports part-time

- Anthem Sports & Entertainment (Canada)
  - Fight Network
  - GameTV
  - Game+
- Bell Media (Canada) (see: List of assets owned by Bell Media)
  - CTV†
  - CTV 2†
  - RDS
  - RDS 2
  - RDS Info
  - TSN 1
  - TSN 2
  - TSN 3
  - TSN 4
  - TSN 5
  - TSN The Ocho
- Groupe TVA (Canada)
  - TVA Sports
  - TVA Sports 2
  - TVA Sports 3
- REV TV (Canada)
- Rogers Sports & Media (Canada)
  - Sportsnet East
  - Sportsnet Ontario
  - Sportsnet West
  - Sportsnet Pacific
  - Sportsnet One
  - Sportsnet Canucks
  - Sportsnet Flames
  - Sportsnet Oilers
  - Sportsnet 360
  - Sportsnet World
- Sportsman Channel
- Wild TV Inc. (Canada)
  - The Cowboy Channel Canada
  - RFD-TV
  - Water Television Network

Premium, streaming and ethnic sports networks

- ATN (Canada)
  - ATN DD Sports
  - CBN
- beIN Sports (Canada)
- DAZN
- EuroWorld Sport
- FuboTV
- Fox Sports Racing
- Ginx TV (Canada)
- HPItv (Canada)
- NBA TV (Canada)
- OneSoccer
- Willow

==== Former channels ====
- ATN Cricket Plus
- ESPN Classic Canada
- WWE Network

=== Chile ===
==== Current channels ====
- Campo Abierto Televisión
- CDO (Chile)
  - CDO 2
- Claro Sports (Chile)
  - Claro Sports 1
  - Claro Sports 2
- DSports (Chile)
  - DSports 2
  - DSports +
- Discovery Turbo
- ESPN (Latin America)
  - ESPN 2 (including HD)
  - ESPN 3 (including HD)
  - ESPN 4 (including HD)
  - ESPN 5 (including HD)
  - ESPN 6 (including HD)
  - ESPN 7 (including HD)
  - ESPN Premium (including HD)
- Gol TV (Latin American)
- Golf Channel
- Movistar Deportes (Chile)
  - Movistar Deportes 2
  - Movistar Deportes 3
  - Movistar Deportes 4
  - Movistar Deportes Plus
  - Movistar Max (five channels)
- TNT Sports (Chile)
  - TNT Sports Basic
  - TNT Sports Premium
- Teletrak TV
- UFC Network
- Vive! Deportes
- VXD

==== Former channels ====
- Fox Sports (Chile) (including HD)
- Fox Sports 2 (including HD)
- Fox Sports 3 (including HD)

=== Colombia ===
==== Current channels ====
- Caracol Sports en vivo
- Claro Sports (Colombia)
  - Claro Sports 1
  - Claro Sports 2
- DSports (Colombia)
  - DSports 2
  - DSports +
- Discovery Turbo
- ESPN (Latin America)
  - ESPN 2 (including HD)
  - ESPN 3 (including HD)
  - ESPN 4 (including HD)
  - ESPN 5 (including HD)
  - ESPN 6 (including HD)
  - ESPN 7 (including HD)
- Gol TV (Latin American)
- Golf Channel
- Movistar Deportes (Colombia)
  - Movistar Deportes 2
  - Movistar Deportes 3
  - Movistar Deportes 4
  - Movistar Deportes Plus
  - Movistar Max (five channels)
- RCN Deportes en vivo
- UFC Network
- Win Sports
- Win+ Fútbol

==== Former channels ====
- Fox Sports (Colombia) (including HD)
- Fox Sports 2 (including HD)
- Fox Sports 3 (including HD)

=== Costa Rica ===
- Claro Sports (Costa Rica)
  - Claro Sports 1
  - Claro Sports 2
- DSports (Costa Rica)
  - DSports 2
  - DSports +
- Discovery Turbo
- ESPN (Latin America)
  - ESPN 2 (including HD)
  - ESPN 3 (including HD)
  - ESPN 4 (including HD)
  - ESPN Extra (including HD)
- Fox Sports (Latin America)
  - Fox Sports 2 (including HD)
  - Fox Sports 3 (including HD)
- FUTV
- GOL TV
- Golf Channel
- TD+ (Costa Rica)
  - TD+2
- Tigo Sports (Costa Rica)
  - Tigo Sports 2
  - Tigo Sports 3
  - Tigo Sports 4
  - Tigo Sports 5
  - Tigo Sports Plus
  - Tigo Sports Max (five channels)
- TUDN
- UFC Network

=== Cuba ===
- DSports (Cuba)
  - DSports 2
  - DSports +
- ESPN (Central America)
  - ESPN 2 (including HD)
  - ESPN 3 (including HD)
  - ESPN 4 (including HD)
  - ESPN 5 (including HD)
  - ESPN 6 (including HD)
- Fox Sports (Central America)
  - Fox Sports 2 (including HD)
  - Fox Sports 3 (including HD)
- Tele Rebelde

=== Dominica ===
- DSports (Dominica)
  - DSports 2
  - DSports +
- ESPN (Central America)
  - ESPN 2 (including HD)
  - ESPN 3 (including HD)
  - ESPN 4 (including HD)
  - ESPN 5 (including HD)
  - ESPN 6 (including HD)
- Fox Sports (Central America)
  - Fox Sports 2 (including HD)
  - Fox Sports 3 (including HD)

=== Dominican Republic ===
- Claro Sports (Dominican Republic)
  - Claro Sports 1
  - Claro Sports 2
- DSports (Dominican Republic)
  - DSports 2
  - DSports +
- ESPN (Central America)
  - ESPN 2 (including HD)
  - ESPN 3 (including HD)
  - ESPN 4 (including HD)
  - ESPN 5 (including HD)
  - ESPN 6 (including HD)
- Fox Sports (Central America)
  - Fox Sports 2 (including HD)
  - Fox Sports 3 (including HD)

=== Ecuador ===
==== Current channels ====
- Claro Sports (Ecuador)
  - Claro Sports 1
  - Claro Sports 2
- Discovery Turbo
- DSports (Ecuador)
  - DSports 2
  - DSports +
- ECDF (Ecuador)
  - ECDF 2
  - ECDF 3
  - ECDF Internacional
- ESPN (Latin America)
  - ESPN 2 (including HD)
  - ESPN 3 (including HD)
  - ESPN 4 (including HD)
  - ESPN 5 (including HD)
  - ESPN 6 (including HD)
  - ESPN 7 (including HD)
  - ESPN Extra (including HD)
- GOL TV
- Golf Channel
- Movistar Deportes (Ecuador)
  - Movistar Deportes 2
  - Movistar Deportes 3
  - Movistar Deportes 4
  - Movistar Deportes Plus
  - Movistar Max (five channels)
- UFC Network

==== Former channels ====
- CNT Sports
- Fox Sports (Latin America) (including HD)
- Fox Sports 2 (including HD)
- Fox Sports 3 (including HD)

=== El Salvador ===
- Claro Sports (El Salvador)
  - Claro Sports 1
  - Claro Sports 2
- ESPN (Latin America)
  - ESPN 2 (including HD)
  - ESPN 3 (including HD)
  - ESPN 4 (including HD)
  - ESPN Extra (including HD)
- Fox Sports (Central America)
  - Fox Sports 2 (including HD)
  - Fox Sports 3 (including HD)
- Movistar Deportes (El Salvador)
  - Movistar Deportes 2
  - Movistar Deportes 3
  - Movistar Deportes 4
  - Movistar Deportes Plus
  - Movistar Max (five channels)
- Tigo Sports (El Salvador)
  - Tigo Sports 2
  - Tigo Sports 3
  - Tigo Sports 4
  - Tigo Sports 5
  - Tigo Sports Plus
  - Tigo Sports Max (five channels)

=== Guatemala ===
- Claro Sports (Guatemala)
  - Claro Sports 1
  - Claro Sports 2
- ESPN (Latin America)
  - ESPN 2 (including HD)
  - ESPN 3 (including HD)
  - ESPN 4 (including HD)
  - ESPN Extra (including HD)
- Fox Sports (Central America)
  - Fox Sports 2 (including HD)
  - Fox Sports 3 (including HD)
- Tigo Sports (Guatemala)
  - Tigo Sports 2
  - Tigo Sports 3
  - Tigo Sports 4
  - Tigo Sports 5
  - Tigo Sports Plus
  - Tigo Sports Max (five channels)

=== Guyana ===
- Automoto La chaîne
- beIN Sports (Caribbean)
  - beIN Sports 1
  - beIN Sports 2
  - beIN Sports 3
  - beIN Sports Max 4
  - beIN Sports Max 5
- Canal+ Sport (Caribbean)
  - Canal+ Sport 360
  - Canal+ Foot
  - Canal+ Premier League
  - Canal+ Live (1-18)
  - Canal+ Ayiti Sport 1
- Cheval TV (horse racing)
- DAZN (Caribbean)
  - DAZN 1
  - DAZN 2
  - DAZN 3
  - DAZN 4
  - DAZN 5
- Equidia
- Eurosport (Caribbean)
  - Eurosport 1
  - Eurosport 2
- Golf+
- Infosport+
- La Chaîne L'Équipe
- MGGTV
- Sport en France

=== Haiti ===
- Automoto La chaîne
- beIN Sports (Caribbean)
  - beIN Sports 1
  - beIN Sports 2
  - beIN Sports 3
  - beIN Sports Max 4
  - beIN Sports Max 5
- Canal+ Sport (Caribbean)
  - Canal+ Sport 360
  - Canal+ Foot
  - Canal+ Live (1-18)
  - Canal+ Premier League
  - Canal+ Ayiti Sport 1
- Cheval TV (horse racing)
- DAZN (Caribbean)
  - DAZN 1
  - DAZN 2
  - DAZN 3
  - DAZN 4
  - DAZN 5
- Equidia
- Eurosport (Caribbean)
  - Eurosport 1
  - Eurosport 2
- Golf+
- Haiti Sports TV 1
- Haiti Sports TV 2
- Infosport+
- La Chaîne L'Équipe
- MGG TV
- Punch TV (combat sports)
- Sport en France

=== Honduras ===
- Claro Sports (Honduras)
  - Claro Sports 1
  - Claro Sports 2
- DSports (Honduras)
  - DSports 2
  - DSports +
- ESPN (Latin America)
  - ESPN 2 (including HD)
  - ESPN 3 (including HD)
  - ESPN 4 (including HD)
  - ESPN Extra (including HD)
- Fox Sports (Central America)
  - Fox Sports 2 (including HD)
  - Fox Sports 3 (including HD)
- Tigo Sports (Honduras)
  - Tigo Sports 2
  - Tigo Sports 3
  - Tigo Sports 4
  - Tigo Sports 5
  - Tigo Sports Plus
  - Tigo Sports Max (five channels)
- Todo Deportes TV

=== Jamaica ===
- ESPN (Caribbean)
  - ESPN 2
- Fox Sports (Caribbean)
  - Fox Sports 1
  - Fox Sports 2
  - Fox Sports Racing
  - Fox Soccer Plus
- Flow Sports (Jamaica)
  - Flow Sports 1
  - Flow Sports 2
  - Flow Sports Extra 3
  - Flow Sports Extra 4
  - Flow Sports Extra 5
  - Flow Sports Extra 6
  - Flow Sports Extra 7
  - Flow Sports Extra 8
  - Flow Sports Premier
- Rush Sports (Jamaica)
  - Rush Sports 2
- Sports Max (Jamaica)
  - Sports Max 2
  - Sports Max Plus
  - Sports Max Cricket
- TVJ Sports

=== Nicaragua ===
- Claro Sports (Nicaragua)
  - Claro Sports 1
  - Claro Sports 2
- DSports (Nicaragua)
  - DSports 2
  - DSports +
- ESPN (Latin America)
  - ESPN 2 (including HD)
  - ESPN 3 (including HD)
  - ESPN 4 (including HD)
  - ESPN Extra (including HD)
- Fox Sports (Central America)
  - Fox Sports 2 (including HD)
  - Fox Sports 3 (including HD)
- Tigo Sports (Nicaragua)
  - Tigo Sports 2
  - Tigo Sports 3
  - Tigo Sports 4
  - Tigo Sports 5
  - Tigo Sports Plus
  - Tigo Sports Max (five channels)

=== Martinique ===
- Automoto La chaîne
- beIN Sports (Caribbean)
  - beIN Sports 1
  - beIN Sports 2
  - beIN Sports 3
  - beIN Sports Max 4
  - beIN Sports Max 5
- Canal+ Sport (Caribbean)
  - Canal+ Sport 360
  - Canal+ Foot
  - Canal+ Live (1-18)
  - Canal+ Premier League
  - Canal+ Ayiti Sport 1
- Cheval TV (horse racing)
- DAZN (Caribbean)
  - DAZN 1
  - DAZN 2
  - DAZN 3
  - DAZN 4
  - DAZN 5
- Equidia
- Eurosport (Caribbean)
  - Eurosport 1
  - Eurosport 2
- Golf+
- Infosport+
- La Chaîne L'Équipe
- MGGTV
- Sport en France

=== Mexico ===
† – Channel primarily televises others types of news or entertainment channels, only offers sports part-time

- AYM Sports
- Basket América TV
- Béisbol Latino TV
- Canal 6†
- Canal Once†
- Claro Sports
- CombaTV
- ESPN (Mexico)
  - ESPN 2 (including HD)
  - ESPN 3 (including HD)
  - ESPN 4 (including HD)
- Fox (Mexico)
  - Fox+
- Golf Channel
- Hi Sports
- Imagen Televisión†
- Mega Sports
- Nación Deportes
  - Nación Deportes 2 (including HD)
  - Nación Deportes 3 (including HD)
  - Nación Deportes Premium (including HD)
- NBA TV
- NFL Network
- PX Sports
- TelevisaUnivision
  - Adrenalina Sports Network
  - Canal 5†
  - Las Estrellas†
  - Nueve†
  - Sky Sports (Mexico)
  - TUDN
- TNT Sports (Mexico)
  - Cinemax†
  - Space†
  - TNT†
- TV Azteca
  - Azteca Uno†
  - Azteca 7†
  - Azteca Deportes Network
- TVC Deportes
  - TVC Deportes 2

=== Panama ===
- Cable Onda Sports
- Claro Sports (Panama)
  - Claro Sports 1
  - Claro Sports 2
- DSports (Panama)
  - DSports 2
  - DSports +
- ESPN (Latin America)
  - ESPN 2 (including HD)
  - ESPN 3 (including HD)
  - ESPN 4 (including HD)
  - ESPN Extra (including HD)
- Fox Sports (Latin America)
  - Fox Sports 2 (including HD)
  - Fox Sports 3 (including HD)
- Tigo Sports (Panama)
  - Tigo Sports 2
  - Tigo Sports 3
  - Tigo Sports 4
  - Tigo Sports 5
  - Tigo Sports Plus
  - Tigo Sports Max (five channels)

=== Paraguay ===
==== Current channels ====
- Claro Sports (Paraguay)
- Discovery Turbo
- Channel 18
- Copaco TV Sports
- CMM Sports (Paraguay)
  - CMM Sports 2
- DeporTV
- DSports (Paraguay)
  - DSports 2
  - DSports +
- ESPN (Latin America)
  - ESPN 2 (including HD)
  - ESPN 3 (including HD)
  - ESPN 4 (including HD)
  - ESPN 5 (including HD)
  - ESPN 6 (including HD)
  - ESPN 7 (including HD)
- Gol TV (Latin American)
- Golf Channel
- Movistar Deportes (Paraguay)
  - Movistar Deportes 2
  - Movistar Deportes 3
  - Movistar Deportes 4 (including HD)
  - Movistar Deportes 5 (including HD)
  - Movistar Deportes Plus
  - Movistar Max (five channels)
- Ocho TV (Paraguay)
  - Ocho TV Plus
  - Ocho Deportes
- Personal Sports (Paraguay)
  - Personal Sports 2
- Tigo Sports (Paraguay)
  - Tigo Sports 2
  - Tigo Sports 3
  - Tigo Sports 4
  - Tigo Sports 5
  - Tigo Sports Plus
  - Tigo Sports Max (five channels)
- Unicanal Deportes
- UFC Network

==== Former channels ====
- Fox Sports (Latin America) (including HD)
- Fox Sports 2 (including HD)
- Fox Sports 3 (including HD)

=== Peru ===
==== Current channels ====
- Best Cable Sports
- Claro Sports (Peru)
- Discovery Turbo
- DSports (Peru)
  - DSports 2
  - DSports +
- ESPN (Latin America)
  - ESPN 2 (including HD)
  - ESPN 3 (including HD)
  - ESPN 4 (including HD)
  - ESPN 5 (including HD)
  - ESPN 6 (including HD)
  - ESPN 7 (including HD)
- Gol TV (Latin American)
  - GOLPERU
- Golf Channel
- L1 (Peru)
  - L1Max
  - L1Basic
- Monterrico TV
- Movistar Deportes (Peru)
  - Movistar Deportes 2
  - Movistar Deportes 3
  - Movistar Deportes 4
  - Movistar Deportes Plus
  - Movistar Max (five channels)
- Nativa Deportes
- Toros TV

==== Former channels ====
- Fox Sports (Latin America) (including HD)
- Fox Sports 2 (including HD)
- Fox Sports 3 (including HD)

=== Puerto Rico ===
- DSports (Puerto Rico)
  - DSports 2
  - DSports +
- ESPN (Central America)
  - ESPN 2 (including HD)
  - ESPN 3 (including HD)
  - ESPN 4 (including HD)
  - ESPN 5 (including HD)
  - ESPN 6 (including HD)
- Fox Sports (Central America)
  - Fox Sports 2 (including HD)
  - Fox Sports 3 (including HD)
- Latin American Sports (Puerto Rico)
- WAPA Deportes
- Tigo Sports (Puerto Rico)
  - Tigo Sports 2
  - Tigo Sports 3
  - Tigo Sports 4
  - Tigo Sports 5
  - Tigo Sports Plus
  - Tigo Sports Max (five channels)
- TUDN (Puerto Rico)

=== Trinidad and Tobago ===
- DSports (Trinidad and Tobago)
  - DSports 2
  - DSports +
- ESPN (Caribbean)
  - ESPN 2
- Fox Sports (Caribbean)
  - Fox Sports 1
  - Fox Sports 2
  - Fox Sports Racing
  - Fox Soccer Plus
- Flow Sports (Trinidad and Tobago)
  - Flow Sports 1
  - Flow Sports 2
  - Flow Sports Extra 3
  - Flow Sports Extra 4
  - Flow Sports Extra 5
  - Flow Sports Extra 6
  - Flow Sports Extra 7
  - Flow Sports Extra 8
  - Flow Sports Premier
- Rush Sports (Trinidad and Tobago)
  - Rush Sports 2
- Sports Max (Trinidad and Tobago)
  - Sports Max 2
  - Sports Max Plus
  - Sports Max Cricket

=== United States ===
National sports networks † – Channel primarily televises others types of news or entertainment channels, only offers sports part-time

==== Current channels ====
- AFN Sports (United States)
- Apple TV†
- beIN Sports (USA)
  - beIN Sports
  - beIN Sports Xtra
- BYU TV (otherwise Brigham Young University-owned family and faith network features coverage of BYU Cougars sporting events)
- Comcast (United States)
  - NBC Sports
  - NBC Sports NOW
  - NBC†
  - NBCSN
  - Peacock†
  - Telemundo Deportes
  - Telemundo Deportes Ahora
  - Universo†
- DAZN
- Disney (United States)
  - ABC/ESPN on ABC†
  - ACC Network
  - ESPN
  - ESPN (streaming service)
  - ESPN 2
  - ESPN 3
  - ESPN 8 The Ocho
  - ESPN+
  - ESPN Deportes
  - ESPN News
  - ESPN U
  - NFL Network (NFL RedZone)
  - SEC Network
- Fight Network
- Fox Corporation (United States)
  - BTN
  - FOX†
  - Fox One
  - Fox Deportes
  - Fox Soccer Plus
  - Fox Sports
  - FS1
  - FS2
- FuboTV (United States)
  - Fubo Cycling
  - Fubo Sports Network
- FanDuel TV (United States)
  - FanDuel Racing
- MLB Network (MLB Strike Zone)
- NBA TV
- Next Level Sports
- NHL Network
- Outdoor Channel
- Pursuit Channel
- Racer Network
- Ringside Network
- Skydance (United States)
  - CBS†
  - CBS Sports
  - CBS Sports Golazo Network
  - CBS Sports Network
  - CBS Sports HQ
  - Nickelodeon†
  - TBS†
  - TNT†
  - TNT Sports (United States)
  - TruTV†
  - HBO Max†
  - Paramount+†
- Sportsman Channel
- Stadium
- The Ski Channel
- Tennis Channel
- TelevisaUnivision (United States)
  - TUDN
  - Univision†
  - UniMás†
  - Galavisión†
- UFC Network
- Versant
  - USA Sports
  - CNBC†
  - Golf Channel
  - USA Network†
- Willow
- World Fishing Network
- Yahoo Sports Network

==== Former channels ====
- ESPN Goal Line & Bases Loaded
- GOLTV
- Longhorn Network
- Olympic Channel
- Pac-12 Network
- WWE Network

Regional sports networks

- Altitude
- Angels Broadcast Television
- Arizona's Family Sports
- BravesVision
- Chicago Sports Network
- Detroit SportsNet
- Gulf Coast Sports & Entertainment Network
- Marquee Sports Network
- MASN
- Monumental Sports Network
- MSG Network (United States)
  - MSG Sportsnet
  - MSG Western New York
- New England Sports Network (United States)
  - NESN
  - NESN Plus
  - NESN 360
- NBC Sports Regional Networks (United States)
  - NBC Sports Bay Area
  - NBC Sports California
  - NBC Sports Boston
  - NBC Sports Philadelphia
  - SportsNet New York (8%)
- Peachtree Sports Network
- Rangers Sports Network
- Rock Entertainment Sports Network
- Space City Home Network
- Spectrum Sports (United States)
  - Spectrum SportsNet
  - Spectrum SportsNet LA
  - Spectrum Deportes
- SportsNet Pittsburgh
- YES Network
- YurView California
- YurView Louisiana

==== Former channels ====
- AT&T SportsNet
- FanDuel Sports Network (formerly Bally Sports)
  - Bally Sports Arizona
  - Bally Sports New Orleans
  - Bally Sports San Diego
  - FanDuel Sports Network Detroit
  - FanDuel Sports Network Great Lakes
  - FanDuel Sports Network Florida
  - FanDuel Sports Network Indiana
  - FanDuel Sports Network Kansas City
  - FanDuel Sports Network Midwest
  - FanDuel Sports Network North
  - FanDuel Sports Network Ohio
  - FanDuel Sports Network Oklahoma
  - FanDuel Sports Network SoCal
  - FanDuel Sports Network South
  - FanDuel Sports Network Southeast
  - FanDuel Sports Network Southwest
  - FanDuel Sports Network Sun
  - FanDuel Sports Network Wisconsin
- Cox Sports Television
- NBC Sports Chicago
- Root Sports Northwest

=== Uruguay ===
==== Current channels ====
- ANTEL TV Sports
- CMM Sports
- CMM Sports 2
- Channel 20 of TCC
- Crocs
- DeporTV
- DSports (Uruguay)
  - DSports 2
  - DSports +
  - DSports Fight
- Discovery Turbo
- ESPN (Latin America)
  - ESPN 2 (including HD)
  - ESPN 3 (including HD)
  - ESPN 4 (including HD)
  - ESPN 5 (including HD)
  - ESPN 6 (including HD)
  - ESPN 7 (including HD)
- Gol TV (Latin American)
- Golf Channel
- Movistar Deportes (Uruguay)
  - Movistar Deportes 2
  - Movistar Deportes 3
  - Movistar Deportes 4
  - Movistar Deportes Plus
  - Movistar Max (five channels)
- Nueve TV Plus
- Personal Sports
- Personal Sports 2
- Tigo Sports (Uruguay)
  - Tigo Sports 2
  - Tigo Sports 3
  - Tigo Sports 4
  - Tigo Sports 5
  - Tigo Sports Plus
  - Tigo Sports Max (five channels)
- TCC Sports
- UFC Network
- VTV Plus

==== Former channels ====
- Fox Sports (Uruguayan TV channel) (including HD)
- Fox Sports 2 (including HD)
- Fox Sports 3 (including HD)

=== Venezuela ===
==== Current channels ====
- 1 Baseball Network
- ByM Sports
- DSports (Venezuela)
  - DSports 2
- ESPN (Latin America)
  - ESPN 2 (including HD)
  - ESPN 3 (including HD)
  - ESPN 4 (including HD)
  - ESPN 5 (including HD)
  - ESPN 6 (including HD)
  - ESPN 7 (including HD)
- Meridiano Televisión Sports
- Movistar Deportes (Venezuela)
  - Movistar Deportes 2
  - Movistar Deportes 3
  - Movistar Deportes 4
  - Movistar Deportes Plus
  - Movistar Max (five channels)
- SimpleTV Sports
- TyC Sports (Venezuela)
  - TyC Sports
  - TyC Sports 2

==== Former channels ====
- Canal Plus TV
- DirecTV Sports (Venezuela)
- Discovery Turbo
- Fox Sports (Latin America) (including HD)
- Fox Sports 2 (including HD)
- Fox Sports 3 (including HD)
- Gol TV (Latin American)
- Golf Channel
- UFC Network

== Asia ==
=== Afghanistan ===
- Ariana TV
- Lemar TV
- RTA Sports
- Tolo TV
- 3 Sport

=== Armenia ===
- Fast Sports (Armenia)
  - Fast Sports 1
  - Fast Sports 2
- Setanta Sports (Eurasia)
  - Setanta Sports 1
  - Setanta Sports 2

=== Azerbaijan ===
- CBC Sport
- Idman TV
- Setanta Sports (Eurasia)
  - Setanta Sports 1
  - Setanta Sports 2

=== Bangladesh ===
- Eurosport (India) (including HD)
- Sony Sports Network (Bangla)
  - Sony Sports Ten 1 (including HD)
  - Sony Sports Ten 2 (including HD)
  - Sony Sports Ten 3 (including HD)
  - Sony Sports Ten 4 (including HD)
  - Sony Sports Ten 5 (including HD)
- Star Sports Network (Bangla)
  - Star Sports 1 (including HD)
  - Star Sports 2 (including HD)
  - Star Sports 3
  - Star Sports Select 1 (including HD)
  - Star Sports Select 2 (including HD)
  - Star Sports 1 Hindi (including HD)
  - Star Sports 2 Hindi (including HD)
  - Star Sports Khel
  - Star Sports 1 Tamil (including HD)
  - Star Sports 2 Tamil (including HD)
  - Star Sports 1 Telugu (including HD)
  - Star Sports 2 Telugu (including HD)
  - Star Sports 1 Kannada
  - Star Sports 2 Kannada
- T Sports

=== Bhutan ===
- DD Sports
- Eurosport (India) (including HD)
- Sony Sports Network (Bhutan)
  - Sony Sports Ten 1 (including HD)
  - Sony Sports Ten 2 (including HD)
  - Sony Sports Ten 3 (including HD)
  - Sony Sports Ten 4 (including HD)
  - Sony Sports Ten 5 (including HD)
- Star Sports Network (Bhutan)
  - Star Sports First
  - Star Sports 1 (including HD)
  - Star Sports 2 (including HD)
  - Star Sports Select 1 (including HD)
  - Star Sports Select 2 (including HD)

=== Brunei ===
==== Current channels ====
- Astro Arena (Brunei)
  - Astro Stadium
  - Astro Arena Bola
  - Astro Arena Bola 2
- Astro Sports (Brunei)
  - Astro Grandstand
  - Astro Premier League
  - Astro Premier League 2
  - Astro Football
  - Astro Badminton
  - Astro Sports Plus
  - Astro Tennis
  - Astro Golf
- beIN Sports (Brunei)
  - beIN Sports 1
  - beIN Sports 2
  - beIN Sports 3
- Cricbuzz TV
- Premier Sports (Asia)
- W-Sport

==== Former channels ====
- Astro Cricket
- Astro SuperSport (Astro SuperSport 2, Astro SuperSport 3, Astro SuperSport 4, Astro SuperSport 5)
- eGG Network
- Eurosport (Asia)
- Golf Channel
- Setanta Sports Asia
- SPOTV (SPOTV2)
- WWE Network

=== Cambodia ===
- PPCTV Sport

=== China ===
- AHTV Sports
- BRTV-6
- CCTV-5
- CCTV-16
- CCTV-5+
- CCTV-Billiards
- CCTV-Golf and Tennis
- CCTV-Storm Football
- JSBC Sports & Leisure
- SDTV-3
- SMG Great Sports
- SZTV-6
- TJTV-6

=== Hong Kong ===
==== Current channels ====
- beIN Sports (Hong Kong)
  - beIN Sports 1
  - beIN Sports 2
  - beIN Sports 3
  - beIN Sports 4
  - beIN Sports 5
  - beIN Sports 6
- Cricbuzz TV
- MUTV (Manchester United F.C.)
- NBA TV
- Now Sports (Hong Kong)
  - Now Sports 1 (including 4K)
  - Now Sports 2 (including 4K)
  - Now Sports 3 (including 4K)
  - Now Sports 4
  - Now Sports 5
  - Now Sports 6
  - Now Sports 7
  - Now Sports Premier League (620-627 premier league channels)
  - Now Sports Prime
  - Now Sports 641
  - Now Sports 647
  - Now Sports 650
  - Now Sports 651
  - Now Sports 652
  - Now 668 (horse racing)
  - Now Sports Plus
  - Now Golf 2
  - Now Golf 3
- Premier Sports (Asia)

==== Former channels ====
† – Channel primarily televises other types of TV news programmes, only offers sports part-time

- Astro Cricket
- Cable Sports
- Cable Sports 2
- Cable HD603
- GOALTV
- RTHK TV 36
- Setanta Sports Asia
- SPOTV (Hong Kong)
  - SPOTV 2
- TVB Finance, Sports & Information Channel†

=== Israel ===
==== Current channels ====
- Eurosport (Israel)
  - Eurosport 1 (including HD)
  - Eurosport 2 (including HD)
- Extreme Sports Channel
- Ego Total (fighting channel)
- ONE 1 (including HD)
- ONE 2 (including HD)
- Sport 1 (including HD)
- Sport 2 (including HD)
- Sport 5 (Israel)
  - Sport 5 (including HD)
  - Sport +5 (including HD)
  - Sport +5 GOLD (including HD)
  - Sport +5 Live (including HD)
  - Sport +5 Stars (including HD)
- Sport TOGO (Israel)
  - Sport TOGO 1 (including HD)
  - Sport TOGO 2 (including HD)
  - Sport TOGO 3 (including HD)
  - Sport TOGO 4 (including HD)

==== Former channels ====
- ESPN
- Fox Sports (including HD)
- NBA
- Trace Sport Stars

=== India ===
==== Current channels ====
- DD Sports (including HD)
- Eurosport (India) (including HD)
- Star Sports Network (India)
  - Star Sports 1 (including HD)
  - Star Sports 2 (including HD)
  - Star Sports 3
  - Star Sports Select 1 (including HD)
  - Star Sports Select 2 (including HD)
  - Star Sports 1 Hindi (including HD)
  - Star Sports 2 Hindi (including HD)
  - Star Sports Khel
  - Star Sports 1 Tamil (including HD)
  - Star Sports 2 Tamil (including HD)
  - Star Sports 1 Telugu (including HD)
  - Star Sports 2 Telugu (including HD)
  - Star Sports 1 Kannada
  - Star Sports 2 Kannada
- Sony Sports Network (India)
  - Sony Sports Ten 1 (including HD)
  - Sony Sports Ten 2 (including HD)
  - Sony Sports Ten 3 Hindi (including HD)
  - Sony Sports Ten 4 Tamil
  - Sony Sports Ten 4 Telugu
  - Sony Sports Ten 4 Kannada
  - Sony Sports Ten 5 (including HD)
- Unite8 Sports (India)
  - Unite8 Sports 1 (including HD)
  - Unite8 Sports 2 (including HD)

==== Former channels ====
- Neo Sports
- Neo Prime
- Sony ESPN
- Sony KIX
- Sony Ten Golf HD
- Sports18
- Star ESPN
- Zee Sports
- 1Sports

=== Indonesia ===
† – Channel primarily televises others types of entertainment channels, only offers sports part-time

==== Current channels ====
- beIN Sports (Indonesia)
  - beIN Sports 1
  - beIN Sports 2
  - beIN Sports 3
  - beIN Sports 4
  - beIN Sports 5
- Champions TV (Indonesia)
  - Champions TV 1
  - Champions TV 2
  - Champions TV 3
  - Champions TV 5
  - Champions TV 6
  - Champions Golf 1
  - Champions Golf 2
  - Champions Fight
- Fight Sports
- First Football
- First Warriors
- Golf+
- Horizon Sport
- Max Sports
- Moji†
- Nex Sports (Indonesia)
  - Nex Sports 1
  - Nex Sports 2
  - Nex Sports 3
  - Nex Sports 4
- NBA TV
- Premier Sports (Asia)
- Soccer Channel
- SPOTV (Indonesia)
  - SPOTV2
- Sportstars (Indonesia)
  - Sportstars 2
  - Sportstars 3
  - Sportstars 4
- TVRI Sport
- Voli TV (Indonesia)
  - Voli TV 2

==== Former channels ====
- Astro SuperSport
- Balap
- Champions TV (Champions TV 4, Champions TV Olympics 1, Champions TV Olympics 2, Champions TV Olympics 3, Champions TV World Cup 1, Champions TV World Cup 2)
- Eurosport (Asia)
- Fox Sports Asia (Fox Sports 1, Fox Sports 2, Fox Sports 3)
- Golf Channel
- Historical Sports
- ID.Cyclist
- Liga Mahasiswa
- Pace Sports
- Setanta Sports Asia
- SportOne
- TSB Now (TSB Now 1, TSB Now 2, TSB Now 3)
- Usee TV (Usee Sports, Usee Sports 2)

=== Iran ===
- IRIB Varzesh (Iran sports channel)
- IRIB TV3
- Persepolis TV
- Persiana Sports
  - Persiana Sports 1
  - Persiana Sports 2
  - Persiana Sports 3

=== Iraq ===
- All Sport
- ASO Sport TV
- Astera Sport
- Biaban Sport
- Shabab Sports
- WAAR TV Sport

=== Japan ===
- DAZN
- Fighting TV Samurai
- Fishing Vision
- Gaora Sports
- Golf Channel
- Golf Network
- Green Channel
- J Sports (Japan)
  - J-Sports 1
  - J-Sports 2
  - J-Sports 3
  - J-Sports 4
- Nittele G+
- Sky A
- Sports Live+
- Table Tennis Badminton TV752

=== Jordan ===
- Al Faisaly TV
- Jordan Sports
- Jordanian Sports Channel
- JSC Sports
- Orange Sport

=== Kazakhstan ===
- KZ Sport 1
- Setanta Sports (Eurasia)
  - Setanta Sports 1
  - Setanta Sports 2
- QSport
- Qazsport

=== Kurdistan ===
- Dasinya Sport
- Duhok Sport
- Halow Sport
- KRD WWE (including HD)
- LD Sport
- MMN Sport (including HD)
- NRT Sport
- Nubar Sport
- Zaxo Sport

=== Kuwait ===
- KTV Sport
- KTV Sport Plus

=== Kyrgyzstan ===
- KTRK Sport
- Setanta Sports (Eurasia)
  - Setanta Sports 1
  - Setanta Sports 2

=== Macau ===
- TDM Sport

=== Malaysia ===
==== Current channels ====
- Astro Arena (Malaysia)
  - Astro Stadium
  - Astro Arena Bola
  - Astro Arena Bola 2
- Astro Sports (Malaysia)
  - Astro Sports UHD
  - Astro Grandstand
  - Astro Premier League
  - Astro Premier League 2
  - Astro Badminton
  - Astro Sports Plus
  - Astro Tennis
  - Astro Golf
- beIN Sports (Malaysia)
  - beIN Sports 1
  - beIN Sports 2
  - beIN Sports 3
- Cricbuzz TV
- SPOTV (Malaysia)
  - SPOTV 2
- Premier Sports (Asia)
- Sukan+
- Total Sports TV
- Unifi Sports (Malaysia)
  - Unifi eSports
- W-Sport

==== Former channels ====
- Astro Arena 2
- Astro Cricket
- Astro SuperSport (Astro SuperSport 2, Astro SuperSport 3, Astro SuperSport 4, Astro SuperSport 5)
- eGG Network
- Eurosport (Asia)
- Fox Sports Asia (Fox Sports 1, Fox Sports 2, Fox Sports 3)
- Golf Channel
- Setanta Sports Asia
- WWE Network

=== Maldives ===
- Ice Sports
  - Ice Xtra
  - Ice Plus

=== Mongolia ===
- Premier Sports Network (Mongolia)
  - Premier Sports Network 1
  - Premier Sports Network 2
  - Premier Sports Network 3
  - Premier Sports Network 4
  - Premier Sports Network 5
- MNB Sport (including HD)

=== Myanmar ===
- Canal+ Sport (Myanmar)
  - Canal+ Sport 1 (including HD)
  - Canal+ Sport 2 (including HD)
  - Canal+ Sport 3 (including HD)
- FightBox
- Mahar E-Sport
- MRTV Sport (including HD)
- SkyNet Sport (Myanmar)
  - SkyNet Sport 1
  - SkyNet Sport 2
  - SkyNet Sport 3 (including HD)
  - SkyNet Sport X (including HD)

=== Nepal ===
- Action Sports
- Eurosport (India) (including HD)
- Sony Sports Network (Nepal)
  - Sony Sports Ten 1 (including HD)
  - Sony Sports Ten 2 (including HD)
  - Sony Sports Ten 3 (including HD)
  - Sony Sports Ten 4 (including HD)
  - Sony Sports Ten 5 (including HD)
  - Ten Cricket (including HD)
- Star Sports Network (Nepal)
  - Star Sports 1 (including HD)
  - Star Sports 2 (including HD)

=== North Korea ===
- Athletic Television

=== Oman ===
† – Channel primarily televises others types of entertainment TV programmes, only offers sports part-time

- Oman Sports TV†

=== Pakistan ===
- A Sports (including HD)
- Geo Super (including HD)
- Fast Sports (including HD)
- M Sports (including HD) (test transmission)
- PTV Sports (including HD)
- Ten Sports (including HD)
- Total Sports (including HD) (test transmission)

=== Philippines ===
==== Current channels ====
- beIN Sports
- Blast Sports
- NBA TV Philippines
- One Sports (Philippines)
  - One Sports+
- Golf+
- PBA Rush
- Pinoy Xtreme Channel
- Premier Sports (Philippines)
  - Premier Sports
  - Premier Sports 2
  - Premier Football
  - Premier Tennis
- PTV Sports
- Solar Sports
- Sports Illustrated Television
- SPOTV (Philippines)
  - SPOTV2
- TAP Sports
- UAAP Varsity Channel

==== Former Channels ====
- ABS-CBN Sports and Action
- Basketball TV
- Balls
- Liga
- NBA Premium TV
- Setanta Sports Asia

=== Qatar ===
==== Current channels ====
- Alkass Sports Channels (Qatar)
  - Alkass Sports Channels 1
  - Alkass Sports Channels 2
  - Alkass Sports Channels 3
  - Alkass Sports Channels 4
  - Alkass Sports Channels 5
  - Alkass Sports Channels 6
  - Alkass Sports Channels 7
  - Alkass Sports Channels 8
- beIN Sports (Qatar)
  - beIN Sports News
  - beIN Sports 1
  - beIN Sports 2
  - beIN Sports 3
  - beIN Sports 4
  - beIN Sports 5
  - beIN Sports 6
  - beIN Sports 7
  - beIN Sports 1 Premium
  - beIN Sports 2 Premium
  - beIN Sports 3 Premium
  - beIN Sports Xtra 1
  - beIN Sports Xtra 2
  - beIN Sports Xtra 3
  - beIN Sports 1 English
  - beIN Sports 2 English
  - beIN Sports 3 English
  - beIN Sports 1 French
  - beIN Sports 2 French
  - beIN Sports 3 French
  - beIN Sports AFC
  - beIN Sports AFC 1
  - beIN Sports AFC 2
  - beIN Sports AFC 3
  - beIN Sports AFC 4
  - beIN Sports NBA
  - beIN Sports Max 1
  - beIN Sports Max 2
  - beIN Sports Max 3
  - beIN Sports Max 4
  - beIN Sports Max 5
  - beIN Sports Max 6

==== Former channels ====
- Al Jazeera Sports 1
- Al Jazeera Sports 2

=== Saudi Arabia ===
==== Current channels ====
† – Channel primarily televises others types of entertainment TV programmes, only offers sports part-time

- KSA Sports (Saudi Arabia)
  - KSA Sports 1 (including HD)
  - KSA Sports 2 (including HD)
  - KSA Sports 3 (including HD)
  - KSA Sports 4 (including HD)
- MBC Action†
- Saudi Sports Company (Saudi Arabia)
  - SSC 1
  - SSC 2
  - SSC 3
  - SSC 4
  - SSC 5
  - SSC Extra 1
  - SSC Extra 2
  - SSC Extra 3
- stc TV Sports (Saudi Arabia)
  - stc TV Sports 1
  - stc TV Sports 2
  - stc TV Sports 3
  - stc TV Sports 4

==== Former channels ====
- ART Sports 1
- ART Sports 2
- ART Sports 3
- ART Sports 4
- ART Sports 5
- ART Sports 6
- Linesport
- MBC Pro Sports 1
- MBC Pro Sports 2
- MBC Pro Sports 3
- MBC Pro Sports 4

=== Singapore ===
==== Current channels ====
- beIN Sports (Singapore)
  - beIN Sports 1
  - beIN Sports 2
  - beIN Sports 3
- Cricbuzz TV
- Fight Sports
- Hub Premier
- Hub Sports
- Pickleball Now
- Premier Sports (Asia)
- SPOTV (Singapore)
  - SPOTV2
- mio Sports

==== Former channels ====
- All Sports Network
- Astro Cricket
- Eurosport (Asia)
- Football Channel
- Fox Sports Asia (Fox Sports 1, Fox Sports 2, Fox Sports 3)
- Golf Channel
- GOALTV (Goal TV 1, Goal TV 2)
- Setanta Sports Asia
- Sportscity
- Star Cricket
- Mio Stadium
- Okto

=== South Korea ===
- ENA Sports
- GOLF & PBA
- IB SPORTS
- JTBC Sports (South Korea)
  - JTBC Golf
- KBS N Sports
- MBC Sports+
- SBS Sports (South Korea)
  - SBS Golf
  - SBS Golf 2
- SPOTV (South Korea)
  - SPOTV2
  - SPOTV Golf+
  - SPOTV Prime
- TvN Sports

=== Sri Lanka ===
† – Channel primarily televises others types of entertainment TV programmes, only offers sports part-time

==== Current channels ====
- Channel Eye†
- ThePapare TV
- PEO Sports
- Eurosport (India) (including HD)
- Premier Sports (including HD)
- Sony Sports Network (Sri Lanka)
  - Sony Sports Ten 1 (including HD)
  - Sony Sports Ten 2 (including HD)
  - Sony Sports Ten 3 (including HD)
  - Sony Sports Ten 4 (including HD)
  - Sony Sports Ten 5 (including HD)
  - Ten Cricket (including HD)
- Star Sports Network (Sri Lanka)
  - Star Sports 1 (including HD)
  - Star Sports 2 (including HD)

==== Former channels ====
- Setanta Sports Asia
- CSN

=== Syria ===
- ON Sport (including HD)
- Syria Sports TV
- Soccery TV

=== Taiwan ===
† – Channel primarily televises others types of education and culture TV programmes, only offers sports part-time

- DAZN (Taiwan)
  - DAZN 1
  - DAZN 2
- CTS Education, Sports and Culture†
- ELTA Sports (Taiwan)
  - ELTA Sports 1
  - ELTA Sports 2
  - ELTA Sports 3
  - ELTA Sports 4
- SPOTV (Taiwan)
  - SPOTV2
- Videoland Sports

=== Tajikistan ===
- Futbol FFT
- Setanta Sports (Eurasia)
  - Setanta Sports 1
  - Setanta Sports 2
- Varzish TV

=== Turkmenistan ===
- Setanta Sports (Eurasia)
  - Setanta Sports 1
  - Setanta Sports 2
- Turkmenistan Sport

=== Thailand ===
==== Current channels ====
- All Sports Network
- beIN Sports (Thailand)
  - beIN Sports 1
  - beIN Sports 2
  - beIN Sports 3
  - beIN Sports 4
  - beIN Sports 5
  - beIN Sports 6
  - beIN Sports 7
  - beIN Sports 8
  - beIN Sports 9
  - beIN Sports 10
- FIFA+
- GMM Sport
- MONOMAX Sports
- SPOTV (Thailand)
  - SPOTV2
- T Sports 7
- True Sports (Thailand)
  - True Premier Football (including HD)
  - True Sports 1 (including HD)
  - True Sports 2 (including HD)
  - True Sports 3 (including HD)
  - True Sports 4 (including HD)
  - True Sports 5
  - True Sports 6
  - True Sports 7
  - True Tennis (including HD)

==== Former channels ====
- Fox Sports Asia (Fox Sports 1, Fox Sports 2, Fox Sports 3)
- Setanta Sports Asia

=== United Arab Emirates ===
==== Current channels ====
- Abu Dhabi Sports (United Arab Emirates)
  - Abu Dhabi Sports 1
  - Abu Dhabi Sports 2
  - Abu Dhabi Sports 3
  - Abu Dhabi Sports 4
  - Abu Dhabi Sports 5
  - Abu Dhabi Sports 6
  - Abu Dhabi Sports Edge
  - Abu Dhabi Sports Yas
- Al Dar Sports (United Arab Emirates)
  - Al Dar Sports 1
  - Al Dar Sports 2
  - Al Dar Sports 3
  - Al Dar Sports 4
- Dubai Sports (United Arab Emirates)
  - Dubai Sports 1
  - Dubai Sports 2
  - Dubai Sports 3
  - Dubai Racing 1
  - Dubai Racing 2
  - Dubai Racing 3
- RMC Sport (MENA)
  - RMC Sport 1
  - RMC Sport 2
- Sharjah Sports

==== Former channels ====
- Abu Dhabi Sports Extra
- OSN Sports 1
- OSN Sports 2
- OSN Sports 3
- OSN Sports 4
- OSN Sports WWE Network
- OSN Sports Fight Network
- OSN Sports Cricket
- The Sports Channel (1, 2 & 3)

=== Uzbekistan ===
† – Channel primarily televises other types of news channels, only offers sports part-time

- Futbol TV
- Setanta Sports (Eurasia)
  - Setanta Sports 1
  - Setanta Sports 2
- Sport
- Uzreport TV†

=== Vietnam ===
† – Channel primarily televises others types of programs, only offers sports part-time

==== Current channels ====
- Eurosport (Asia)
- FPT Play†
- HTV Sport
- ON Sports (Vietnam)
  - ON Sports+†
  - ON Sports News
  - ON Football
  - ON Golf
- SPOTV (Vietnam)
  - SPOTV2
- SCTV15
- SCTV17
- SCTV22
- TV360†
- VTV3†
- VTV6

==== Former channels ====
- Fox Sports Asia (Fox Sports 1, Fox Sports 2, Fox Sports 3)
- K+ SPORT (K+ SPORT 1,K+ SPORT 2, K+ LIVE 1, K+ LIVE 2, K+ LIVE 3)
- VTC3†

== Europe ==
=== Albania ===
- ArtSport (Kosovo)
  - ART Sport 1
  - ART Sport 2
  - ART Sport 3
  - ART Sport 4
  - ART Sport 5
  - ART Sport 6
- Eurosport (Albania)
  - Eurosport 1
  - Eurosport 2
- Klan Sport (Albania)
  - Klan Sport 1
  - Klan Sport 2
- OVERSPORT (Albania)
  - OVERSPORT 1 (including HD)
  - OVERSPORT 2 (including HD)
  - OVERSPORT 3 (including HD)
  - OVERSPORT 4 (including HD)
- RTSH Sport
- SuperSport (Albania)
  - SuperSport 1 (including HD)
  - SuperSport 2 (including HD)
  - SuperSport 3 (including HD)
  - SuperSport 4 (including HD)
  - SuperSport 5 (including HD)
  - SuperSport 6 (including HD)
  - SuperSport 7 (including HD)
- Tring Sport (Albania)
  - Tring Sport News (including HD)
  - Tring Sport 1 (including HD)
  - Tring Sport 2 (including HD)
  - Tring Sport 3 (including HD)
  - Tring Sport 4 (including HD)
  - Tring Sport 5 (including HD)

=== Andorra ===
- DAZN
- Esport3
- Eurosport (Andorra)
  - Eurosport 1
  - Eurosport 2

=== Austria ===
- DAZN (Austria)
  - DAZN Fast+
  - DAZN Rise
- Eurosport (Austria)
  - Eurosport 1
  - Eurosport 2
- ORF Sport +
- Sky Sport (Austria)
  - Sky Sport News
  - Sky Sport Top Event
  - Sky Sport Bundesliga
  - Sky Sport F1
  - Sky Sport Premier League
  - Sky Sport Mix
  - Sky Sport Tennis
  - Sky Sport Golf
  - Sky Sport NFL
  - Sky Sport Austria
- Sportdigital (Austria)
  - Sportdigital Free
  - Sportdigital Scooore
- Wedo Sports

=== Belarus ===
- Belarus 5
- Setanta Sports (Eurasia)
  - Setanta Sports 1
  - Setanta Sports 2

=== Belgium ===
==== Current channels ====
† – Channel primarily televises others types of programs, only offers sports part-time

- DAZN (Belgium)
  - DAZN 1
  - DAZN 2
  - DAZN 3
  - DAZN Pro League 1
  - DAZN Pro League 2
  - DAZN Pro League 3
- Eurosport (Belgium)
  - Eurosport 1
  - Eurosport 2
- Play Sports (Belgium)
  - Play Sports 1
  - Play Sports 2
  - Play Sports 3
  - Play Sports 4
  - Play Sports 5
  - Play Sports 6
  - Play Sports 7
  - Play Sports 8
  - Play Sports Golf
- Pickx+ Sports
- Sport 10
- Sporza†
- VOOsport World (Belgium)
  - VOOsport World 1
  - VOOsport World 2
  - VOOsport World 3
  - VOOsport World 4

==== Former channels ====
- Be Sport 1
- Be Sport 2
- Be Sport 3
- RTL Sport HD
- Eleven Sports (Belgium)

=== Bosnia and Herzegovina ===
- Arena Sport (Bosnia and Herzegovina)
  - Arena Sport 1
  - Arena Sport 2
  - Arena Sport 3
  - Arena Sport 4
  - Arena Sport 5
  - Arena Sport 6
  - Arena Sport 1 Premium
  - Arena Sport 2 Premium
  - Arena Sport 3 Premium
- Eurosport (Bosnia and Herzegovina)
  - Eurosport 1
  - Eurosport 2
- Nova Sport
- Sport Klub (Bosnia and Herzegovina)
  - Sport Klub 1 (including HD)
  - Sport Klub 2 (including HD)
  - Sport Klub 3 (including HD)
  - Sport Klub 4 (including HD)
  - Sport Klub 5 (including HD)
  - Sport Klub 6 (including HD)
  - Sport Klub 7 (including HD)
  - Sport Klub 8 (including HD)
  - Sport Klub 9 (including HD)
  - Sport Klub 10 (including HD)
  - Sport Klub Golf (including HD)
  - Sport Klub Fight (including HD)
  - Sport Klub eSports (including HD)

=== Bulgaria ===
- BNT 3
- Diema Sport (Bulgaria)
  - Diema Sport 1
  - Diema Sport 2
  - Diema Sport 3
- Eurosport (Bulgaria)
  - Eurosport 1
  - Eurosport 2
- Max Sport (Bulgaria)
  - Max Sport 1 (including HD)
  - Max Sport 2 (including HD)
  - Max Sport 3 (including HD)
  - Max Sport 4 (including HD)
- Nova Sport
- Sport+ (Bulgaria) (including HD)
- RING

=== Croatia ===
- Arena Sport (Croatia)
  - Arena Sport 1
  - Arena Sport 2
  - Arena Sport 3
  - Arena Sport 4
  - Arena Sport 5
  - Arena Sport 6
  - Arena Sport 7
  - Arena Sport 8
  - Arena Sport 9
  - Arena Sport 10
- Eurosport (Croatia)
  - Eurosport 1
  - Eurosport 2
- GP1
- Max Sport (Croatia)
  - Max Sport 1
  - Max Sport 2
- Nova Sport
- SPTV
- Sport Klub (Croatia)
  - Sport Klub 1 (including HD)
  - Sport Klub 2 (including HD)
  - Sport Klub 3 (including HD)
  - Sport Klub 4 (including HD)
  - Sport Klub 5 (including HD)
  - Sport Klub 6 (including HD)
  - Sport Klub 7 (including HD)
  - Sport Klub 8 (including HD)
  - Sport Klub 9 (including HD)
  - Sport Klub 10 (including HD)
  - Sport Klub Golf (including HD)
  - Sport Klub Fight (including HD)
  - Sport Klub eSports (including HD)
- Sportska Televizija

=== Cyprus ===
- Cablenet Sports (Cyprus)
  - Cablenet Sports 1
  - Cablenet Sports 2
  - Cablenet Sports 3
- CytaVision Sports (Cyprus)
  - CytaVision Sports 1
  - CytaVision Sports 2
  - CytaVision Sports 3
  - CytaVision Sports 4
  - CytaVision Sports 5
  - CytaVision Sports 6
  - CytaVision Sports 7
  - CytaVision Sports MV
- Eurosport (Cyprus)
  - Eurosport 1
  - Eurosport 2
- Motorvision+
- NBA TV
- Nova Sports (Cyprus)
  - Nova Sports Start
  - Nova Sports Prime
  - Nova Sports 2
  - Nova Sports 3
  - Nova Sports 4
  - Nova Sports 5
  - Nova Sports 6
  - Nova Sports Extra 1
  - Nova Sports Extra 2
  - Nova Sports Extra 3
  - Nova Sports Extra 4
- PrimeTel (Cyprus)
  - PrimeTel 1 (including HD)
  - PrimeTel 2 (including HD)
  - PrimeTel 3 (including HD)

=== Czechia ===
- Canal+ Sport (Czechia & Slovakia)
  - Canal+ Sport 2
- ČT sport
- Eurosport (Czechia)
  - Eurosport 1
  - Eurosport 2
- Fast & FunBox
- FightBox
- Golf Channel (Czechia)
- Nova Sport (Czechia and Slovakia)
  - Nova Sport 1
  - Nova Sport 2
  - Nova Sport 3
  - Nova Sport 4
  - Nova Sport 5
  - Nova Sport 6
- Oneplay Sport (Czechia)
  - Oneplay Sport 1
  - Oneplay Sport 2
  - Oneplay Sport 3
  - Oneplay Sport 4
- Prima Sport
- Sport 1
- Sport 2

=== Denmark ===
==== Current channels ====
† – Channel primarily televises others types of entertainment channels, only offers sports part-time

- Eurosport (Denmark)
  - Eurosport 1
  - Eurosport 2
- Sport Live
- TV 2 Sport (Denmark)
  - TV 2 Sport X
- TV3 Max†
- TV3 Sport
- V Sport (Denmark)
  - V Sport Golf
  - V Sport Live
  - V Sport Ultra
  - Viaplay Sport News

==== Former channels ====
- C More Golf
- C More Hockey
- C More Tennis
- C More Live
- TV3 Sport 2

=== Estonia ===
==== Current channels ====
- Eurosport (Baltics)
  - Eurosport 1
  - Eurosport 2
- Go3 Sport (Baltics)
  - Go3 Sport 1
  - Go3 Sport 2
  - Go3 Sport 3
  - Go3 Sport 4
  - Go3 Sport Open
- Setanta Sports (Baltics)
  - Setanta Sports 1
  - Setanta Sports 2

==== Former channels ====
- TV 4

=== Finland ===
==== Current channels ====
† – Channel primarily televises others types of entertainment TV programmes, only offers sports part-time

†† – Channel televises entertainment and also sports.

- Elisa Viihde Sport (previously known as Fanseat)
- Eurosport (Finland)
  - Eurosport 1
  - Eurosport 2
- MTV Urheilu (Finland)
  - MTV Liiga
  - MTV Max†
  - MTV Urheilu 1
  - MTV Urheilu 2
  - MTV Urheilu 3
- Ruutu††
- V Sport (Finland)
  - V Sport 1
  - V Sport Football
  - V Sport Golf
  - V Sport Live
  - V Sport Premium
  - V Sport Ultra
  - V Sport Vinter
  - Viaplay Urheilu 1
  - Viaplay Urheilu 2
  - Viaplay Urheilu 3
- Viaplay TV

==== Former channels ====
- Ruutu+ Urheilu 1
- Ruutu+ Urheilu 2
- V Sport Jääkiekko

=== France ===
==== Current channels ====
- After Foot TV
- Automoto La chaîne
- beIN Sports (France)
  - beIN Sports 1
  - beIN Sports 2
  - beIN Sports 3
  - beIN Sports Max (4-10)
- Canal+ Sport (France)
  - Canal+ Sport 360
  - Canal+ Foot
  - Canal+ Premier League
  - Canal+ Live (1-19)
- DAZN (France)
  - DAZN 1
  - DAZN 2
  - DAZN 3
  - DAZN 4
  - DAZN 5
- Equidia
- Eurosport (France)
  - Eurosport 1
  - Eurosport 2
  - Eurosport 360° (1-8)
- Extreme Sports Channel
- france.tv Sport
- Golf+
- Golf Channel
- Infosport+
- Journal du Golf TV
- La Chaîne L'Équipe (France)
  - L'Équipe Live 1
  - L'Équipe Live 2
- Ligue 1+
- NFL 24/24 sur M6+
- OL Play
- RMC Sport (France)
  - RMC Sport 1
  - RMC Sport Live (2-4)
  - RMC Sport Access
- Sport en France
- Trace Sport Stars

==== Former channels ====
- Canal+ Formule 1
- Canal+ Ligue 1
- Canal+ MotoGP
- Canal+ Top 14
- france.tv Paris 2024
- france.tv Roland Garros
- Game One
- Foot+
- Padel+
- Rugby+
- RMC Sport 1 UHD
- RMC Sport 2
- RMC Sport 3
- RMC Sport 4
- RMC Sport News

=== Georgia ===
- 1 TV Sporti
- Rugby TV
- Setanta Sports (Eurasia)
  - Setanta Sports 1
  - Setanta Sports 2
  - Setanta Sports 3

=== Germany ===
==== Current channels ====
- Bayern Munich TV
- DAZN (Germany)
  - DAZN 1
  - DAZN 2
  - DAZN Fast+
  - DAZN Rise
- DFB.TV (Germany)
  - DFB Play TV
- DYN Sport (Germany)
  - DYN Sport Mix
- Eurosport (Germany)
  - Eurosport 1
  - Eurosport 2
  - Eurosport 2 Xtra
- Magenta Sport
- More Than Sports TV
- Motorvision+ (Germany)
  - Motorvision Classic
- MyTeam TV - Sport
- Sky Sport (Germany)
  - Sky Sport News
  - Sky Sport Top Event
  - Sky Sport Bundesliga (1-5 bundesliga channel)
  - Sky Sport F1
  - Sky Sport Premier League
  - Sky Sport Mix
  - Sky Sport Tennis
  - Sky Sport Golf
  - Sky Sport NFL
- Sport1 (Germany)
  - Sport1 Motor
- Sportdigital (Germany)
  - Sportdigital Edge
  - Sportdigital Free
  - Sportdigital Fussball
  - Sportdigital Fussball 2
  - Sportdigital Scooore
  - Sportdigital 1+
  - eSports One
- Wedo Sports

==== Former channels ====
- DSF Action
- DSF Golf
- DSF Plus
- ESPN America
- Sky Sport Fanzone
- Super Sports Network

=== Greece ===
- ANT1+ Formula
- ERT2 Sport
- ERT Sports (Greece)
  - ERT Sports 1
  - ERT Sports 2
- Eurosport (Greece)
  - Eurosport 1
  - Eurosport 2
- Magenta Sport (Greece)
  - Magenta Sport Highlights
  - Magenta Sport League 1
  - Magenta Sport League 2
  - Magenta Sport League 3
  - Magenta Sport League 4
  - Magenta Sport Start
  - Magenta Sport 1
  - Magenta Sport 2
  - Magenta Sport 3
  - Magenta Sport 4
  - Magenta Sport 5
  - Magenta Sport 6
  - Magenta Sport 7
  - Magenta Sport 8
  - Magenta Sport 9
- Nova Sports (Greece)
  - Nova Sports News
  - Nova Sports Start
  - Nova Sports Premier League
  - Nova Sports Prime
  - Nova Sports 1
  - Nova Sports 2
  - Nova Sports 3
  - Nova Sports 4
  - Nova Sports 5
  - Nova Sports 6
  - Nova Sports Extra 1
  - Nova Sports Extra 2
  - Nova Sports Extra 3
  - Nova Sports Extra 4
- SportPlus TV

=== Hungary ===
==== Current channels ====
- Arena4
- Eurosport (Hungary)
  - Eurosport 1
  - Eurosport 2
- Match4
- M4 Sport
- M4 Sport +
- Spíler1 TV
- Spíler2 TV
- Sport1
- Sport2

==== Former channels ====
- Digi Sport 1
- Digi Sport 2
- Digi Sport 3

=== Iceland ===
==== Current channels ====
- Eurosport (Iceland)
  - Eurosport 1
  - Eurosport 2
- Síminn Sport (Iceland)
  - Síminn Sport 2
  - Síminn Sport 3
  - Síminn Sport 4
- Sýn Sport (Iceland)
  - Sýn Sport 2
  - Sýn Sport 3
  - Sýn Sport 4
  - Sýn Sport 5
  - Sýn Sport 6
  - Sýn Sport Ísland
  - Sýn Sport Ísland 2
  - Sýn Sport Ísland 3
  - Sýn Sport Ísland 4
  - Sýn Sport Viaplay

==== Former channels ====
- Stöð 2 eSport
- Stöð 2 Golf

=== Ireland ===
==== Current channels ====
- DAZN
- LFC TV
- MUTV (Manchester United F.C.)
- NBA TV
- Premier Sports (Ireland)
  - Premier Sports 1
  - Premier Sports 2
- Sky Sports (Ireland)
  - Sky Sports Main Event
  - Sky Sports Premier League
  - Sky Sports Football
  - Sky Sports Cricket
  - Sky Sports Golf
  - Sky Sports F1
  - Sky Sports Action
  - Sky Sports +
  - Sky Sports Tennis
  - Sky Sports Racing
  - Sky Sports Mix
  - Sky Sports News
  - Sky Sports Box Office
- TNT Sports (Ireland)
  - TNT Sports 1
  - TNT Sports 2
  - TNT Sports 3
  - TNT Sports 4
  - TNT Sports Box Office
  - TNT Sports Ultimate

==== Former channels ====
- Celtic TV
- Eir Sport 1
- Eir Sport 2
- Eleven Sports UK and Ireland
- Eurosport 1
- Eurosport 2
- Racing World
- Rangers TV
- Setanta Sports
- Setanta Sports News
- Setanta Golf
- Virgin Media Sport

=== Italy ===
==== Current channels ====
† – Channel primarily televises others types of entertainment TV programmes, only offers sports part-time

- 20†
- ACI Sport TV
- Bike TV
- DAZN (Italy)
  - DAZN 1
  - DAZN 2
- Discovery Turbo
- Eurosport (Italy)
  - Eurosport 1
  - Eurosport 2
- EQU TV (horse racing)
- Horse TV
- Inter TV
- Lazio Style Channel
- Milan TV
- MS Motor TV
- Rai Sport
- Sky Sport (Italy)
  - Sky Sport 24
  - Sky Sport Uno
  - Sky Sport Calcio
  - Sky Sport Tennis
  - Sky Sport Arena
  - Sky Sport Max
  - Sky Sport Golf
  - Sky Sport F1
  - Sky Sport MotoGP
  - Sky Sport Basket
  - Sky Sport Legend
  - Sky Sport Mix
  - Sky Sport 4K
- Sportitalia (Italy)
  - Sportitalia Plus
  - Sportitalia SI SoloCalcio
- SuperTennis
- Udinese TV

==== Former channels ====
- Eleven Sports
- Fox Sports
- Fox Sports 2
- Juventus TV
- La7 Sport
- Premium Sport
- Premium Calcio
- Premium MotoGP
- Roma TV
- Sky Sport Action

=== Kosovo ===
- ArtSport (Kosovo)
  - ART Sport 1
  - ART Sport 2
  - ART Sport 3
  - ART Sport 4
  - ART Sport 5
  - ART Sport 6
- Eurosport (Kosovo)
  - Eurosport 1
  - Eurosport 2
- K Sport (Kosovo)
  - Kujtesa Sports 1
  - Kujtesa Sports 2
  - Kujtesa Sports 3
  - Kujtesa Sports 4
  - Kujtesa Sports 5
- SuperSport (Kosovo)
  - SuperSport 1
  - SuperSport 2
  - SuperSport 3

=== Latvia ===
- Best4Sport TV (Latvia)
  - Best4Sport TV (including HD)
  - Best4Sport 2 TV (including HD)
- Eurosport (Baltics)
  - Eurosport 1
  - Eurosport 2
- Go3 Sport (Baltics)
  - Go3 Sport 1
  - Go3 Sport 2
  - Go3 Sport 3
  - Go3 Sport 4
  - Go3 Sport Open
- Setanta Sports (Baltics)
  - Setanta Sports 1
  - Setanta Sports 2

=== Liechtenstein ===
- Eurosport (Liechtenstein)
  - Eurosport 1
  - Eurosport 2
- Sportdigital

=== Lithuania ===
- Arena HD Baltic
- Eurosport (Baltics)
  - Eurosport 1
  - Eurosport 2
- Go3 Sport (Baltics)
  - Go3 Sport 1
  - Go3 Sport 2
  - Go3 Sport 3
  - Go3 Sport 4
  - Go3 Sport Open
- Setanta Sports (Baltics)
  - Setanta Sports 1
  - Setanta Sports 2
- Sport1 (Lithuania)

=== Luxembourg ===
- RTL Live Arena
- Eurosport (Luxembourg)
  - Eurosport 1
  - Eurosport 2
- Kombat Sport

=== Malta ===
- Eurosport (Malta)
  - Eurosport 1
  - Eurosport 2
- GO Sports (Malta)
  - GO Sports 1
  - GO Sports 2
  - GO Sports 3
  - GO Sports 4
  - GO Sports 5
  - GO Sports 6
- Melita Sports (Malta)
  - Melita Sports 1
  - Melita Sports 2
  - Melita Sports 3
  - Melita Sports 4
- TVMSport+

=== Moldova ===
- Eurosport (Moldova)
  - Eurosport 1
  - Eurosport 2
- Prima Sport Moldova
- Setanta Sports (Eurasia)
  - Setanta Sports 1
  - Setanta Sports 2

=== Montenegro ===
- Arena Sport (Montenegro)
  - Arena Sport 1
  - Arena Sport 2
  - Arena Sport 3
  - Arena Sport 4
  - Arena Sport 5
  - Arena Sport 6
  - Arena Sport 1 Premium
  - Arena Sport 2 Premium
  - Arena Sport 3 Premium
- Eurosport (Montenegro)
  - Eurosport 1
  - Eurosport 2
- Nova Sport
- Sport Klub (Montenegro)
  - Sport Klub (including HD)
  - Sport Klub 1 (including HD)
  - Sport Klub 2 (including HD)
  - Sport Klub 3 (including HD)
  - Sport Klub 4 (including HD)
  - Sport Klub 5 (including HD)
  - Sport Klub 6 (including HD)

=== Netherlands ===
==== Current channels ====
† – Channel primarily televises other types of entertainment TV & news programmes, only offers sports part-time

- DAZN (Netherlands)
  - DAZN 2
  - DAZN 3
  - DAZN Combat
- Edge Sports
- ESPN (Netherlands)
  - ESPN 2
  - ESPN 3
  - ESPN 4
- Eurosport (Netherlands)
  - Eurosport 1
  - Eurosport 2
- Extreme Sports Channel
- NPO Sport† (timeshared with NPO Politiek en Nieuws)
- Viaplay TV (Netherlands)
  - Viaplay TV+ – A Dutch linear sports channel operated by Viaplay Group. It launched on 5 April 2024 using the SBS9 broadcast slot, and began operating under its own channel license on 14 March 2025. The channel airs sports content including Formula One, Premier League football, and PDC darts.
- Ziggo Sport (Netherlands)
  - Ziggo Sport 2
  - Ziggo Sport 3
  - Ziggo Sport 4
  - Ziggo Sport 5
  - Ziggo Sport 6

==== Former channels ====
- Sport1 (Netherlands)
- Eleven Sports (Netherlands)

=== Northern Cyprus ===
† – Channel primarily televises others types of entertainment TV programmes, only offers sports part-time

- BRT†
- Tivibu Spor TV (Turkey & Northern Cyprus)
  - Tivibu Spor 1
  - Tivibu Spor 2
  - Tivibu Spor 3
  - Tivibu Spor 4

=== North Macedonia ===
† – Channel primarily televises others types of movies channels, only offers sports part-time

- Arena Sport (North Macedonia)
  - Arena Sport 1
  - Arena Sport 2
  - Arena Sport 3
  - Arena Sport 4
  - Arena Sport 5
  - Arena Sport 6
  - Arena Sport 1 Premium
  - Arena Sport 2 Premium
  - Arena Sport 3 Premium
- Eurosport (North Macedonia)
  - Eurosport 1
  - Eurosport 2
- Mnet Sport
- MRT 3†
- Sport Klub (North Macedonia)
  - Sport Klub (including HD)
  - Sport Klub 1 (including HD)
  - Sport Klub 2 (including HD)
  - Sport Klub 3 (including HD)
  - Sport Klub 4 (including HD)
  - Sport Klub 5 (including HD)
  - Sport Klub 6 (including HD)
  - Sport Klub Golf (including HD)
  - Sport Klub Fight (including HD)

=== Norway ===
==== Current channels ====
- Eurosport (Norway)
  - Eurosport 1
  - Eurosport Norge
- TV 2 Sport (Norway)
  - TV 2 Sport 1
  - TV 2 Sport 2
  - TV 2 Sport Premium 1
  - TV 2 Sport Premium 2
- Rikstoto Direkte (horse racing)
- V Sport (Norway)
  - V Sport +
  - V Sport 1
  - V Sport 2
  - V Sport 3
  - V Sport Golf
  - V Sport Premier League (1-4)
  - V Sport Live
  - V Sport Ultra

==== Former channels ====
- C More Extreme
- C More Hockey
- C More Tennis
- C More Live
- C More Sport
- Viasat Sport N

=== Poland ===
- Canal+ Sport (Poland)
  - Canal+ Sport 2
  - Canal+ Sport 3
  - Canal+ Sport 4
  - Canal+ Sport 5
  - Canal+ Sport 6
  - Canal+ Sport 7
  - Canal+ Extra 1
  - Canal+ Extra 2
  - Canal+ Extra 3
  - Canal+ Extra 4
  - Canal+ Now
- Eleven Sports (Poland)
  - Eleven Sports 1
  - Eleven Sports 2
  - Eleven Sports 3
  - Eleven Sports 4
- Eurosport (Poland)
  - Eurosport 1
  - Eurosport 2
- FightKlub
- Golf Channel
- Motowizja
- Polsat Sport (Poland)
  - Polsat Games
  - Polsat Sport 1
  - Polsat Sport 2
  - Polsat Sport 3
  - Polsat Sport Fight
  - Polsat Sport Premium 1
  - Polsat Sport Premium 2
  - Polsat Sport Extra 1
  - Polsat Sport Extra 2
  - Polsat Sport Extra 3
  - Polsat Sport Extra 4
- SportKlub
- TVP Sport

=== Portugal ===
==== Current channels ====
- A Bola TV
- Benfica TV
- Canal 11
- DAZN (Portugal)
  - DAZN 1
  - DAZN 2
  - DAZN 3
  - DAZN 4
  - DAZN 5
- Eurosport (Portugal)
  - Eurosport 1
  - Eurosport 2
- Fuel TV
- FC Porto TV (streaming service)
- NBA TV
- RTP Desporto (Portugal)
  - RTP Desporto 1
  - RTP Desporto 2
  - RTP Desporto 3
  - RTP Desporto 4
- Sport TV (Portugal)
  - Sport TV +
  - Sport TV 1
  - Sport TV 2
  - Sport TV 3
  - Sport TV 4
  - Sport TV 5
  - Sport TV 6
  - Sport TV 7
- Sporting TV

==== Former channels ====
- Eleven Sports (Portugal)
- PFC Internacional

=== Romania ===
==== Current channels ====
† – Channel primarily televises others types of entertainment channels, only offers sports part-time

†† – Channel televises entertainment and also sports.

- Antena Play††
- Digi Sport (Romania)
  - Digi Sport 1
  - Digi Sport 2
  - Digi Sport 3
  - Digi Sport 4
- Eurosport (Romania)
  - Eurosport 1
  - Eurosport 2
- Prima Sport (Romania)
  - Prima Sport 1
  - Prima Sport 2
  - Prima Sport 3
  - Prima Sport 4
  - Prima Sport 5
  - Prima Sport PPV 1
  - Prima Sport PPV 2
  - Prima Sport PPV 3
  - Prima Sport PPV 4
- Pro Arena†
- Sport Extra
- TVR Sport
- Voyo Sport (Romania)
  - Voyo Sport 1
  - Voyo Sport 2

==== Former channels ====
- Boom Sport One
- Boom Sport Two
- Orange Sport 1
- Orange Sport 2
- Orange Sport 3
- Orange Sport 4
- Telesport

=== Russia ===
==== Current channels ====
- Boks TV
- Extreme Sports Channel
- Kontinental Hockey League (Russia)
  - KHL Prime
- Match! (Russia)
  - Match! Premier
  - Match! Arena
  - Match! Boets
  - Match! Futbol 1
  - Match! Futbol 2
  - Match! Futbol 3
  - Match! Game
  - March! Planeta
  - Match! Strana
  - Match! Igra
  - Konniy Mir
- TeleSport
- Trace Sport Stars
- ViJu+ Sport (Russia)

==== Former channels ====
- Eurosport 1
- Eurosport 2
- NTV Plus Sport
- Russia 2

=== San Marino ===
† – Channel primarily televises others types of entertainment channels, only offers sports part-time

- Eurosport (San Marino)
  - Eurosport 1
  - Eurosport 2
- San Marino RTV† (RTV Sport)
- SuperTennis

=== Serbia ===
- Arena Sport (Serbia)
  - Arena Sport 1
  - Arena Sport 2
  - Arena Sport 3
  - Arena Sport 4
  - Arena Sport 5
  - Arena Sport 6
  - Arena Sport 7
  - Arena Sport 8
  - Arena Sport 9
  - Arena Sport 10
  - Arena Sport 1x2
  - Arena Sport 1 Premium
  - Arena Sport 2 Premium
  - Arena Sport 3 Premium
  - Arena Sport 4 Premium
  - Arena Sport 5 Premium
  - Arena Tenis
  - Arena Adrenalin
- Eurosport (Serbia)
  - Eurosport 1
  - Eurosport 2
- Nova Sport
- Sport Klub (Serbia)
  - Sport Klub (including HD)
  - Sport Klub 1 (including HD)
  - Sport Klub 2 (including HD)
  - Sport Klub 3 (including HD)
  - Sport Klub 4 (including HD)
  - Sport Klub 5 (including HD)
  - Sport Klub 6 (including HD)
  - Sport Klub 7 (including HD)
  - Sport Klub 8 (including HD)
  - Sport Klub 9 (including HD)
  - Sport Klub 10 (including HD)
  - Sport Klub Golf (including HD)
  - Sport Klub Fight (including HD)
  - Sport Klub eSports (including HD)
  - Sport Klub Special (including HD)

=== Slovakia ===
==== Current channels ====
- Canal+ Sport (Czechia & Slovakia)
  - Canal+ Sport 1
  - Canal+ Sport 2
- Eurosport (Slovakia)
  - Eurosport 1
  - Eurosport 2
- JOJ Šport (Slovakia)
  - JOJ Šport 2
- Kanal1 Sport (Slovakia)
  - Kanal1 Xtra
- Nova Sport (Czechia and Slovakia)
  - Nova Sport 1
  - Nova Sport 2
  - Nova Sport 3
  - Nova Sport 4
  - Nova Sport 5
  - Nova Sport 6
- Premier Sport (Slovakia)
  - Premier Sport 1
  - Premier Sport 2
  - Premier Sport 3
- Sport 1
- Sport 2
- Šport

==== Former channels ====
- Digi Sport
- Digi Sport 2
- Digi Sport 3
- Digi Sport 4
- Digi Sport 5
- Digi Sport 6
- Orange Šport
- Orange Šport 2
- Orange Šport 3
- Orange Šport 4
- Premier Sport 4
- Slovak Sport.TV
- Slovak Sport.TV 2
- Slovak Sport.TV 3
- Trojka (STV)

=== Slovenia ===
- Arena Sport (Slovenia)
  - Arena Sport 1
  - Arena Sport 2
  - Arena Sport 3
  - Arena Sport 4
  - Arena Sport 1 Premium
- Eurosport (Slovenia)
  - Eurosport 1
  - Eurosport 2
- Šport TV
- Sport Klub (Slovenia)
  - Sport Klub (including HD)
  - Sport Klub 1 (including HD)
  - Sport Klub 2 (including HD)
  - Sport Klub 3 (including HD)
  - Sport Klub 4 (including HD)
  - Sport Klub 5 (including HD)
  - Sport Klub 6 (including HD)
  - Sport Klub Golf (including HD)
  - Sport Klub Fight (including HD)

=== Spain ===
==== Current channels ====
† – Channel primarily televises others types of entertainment channels, only offers sports part-time

- DAZN (Spain)
  - DAZN 1
  - DAZN 2
  - DAZN 3
  - DAZN 4
  - DAZN Baloncesto
  - DAZN Baloncesto 2
  - DAZN Baloncesto 3
  - DAZN F1
  - DAZN LaLiga 1
  - DAZN LaLiga 2
  - DAZN MotoGP
- Esport3
- Eurosport (Spain)
  - Eurosport 1
  - Eurosport 2
- LaLiga+
- LaLiga TV Hypermotion (Spain)
  - LaLiga TV 2 Hypermotion
- Movistar Plus+ (Spain)
  - Deportes por Movistar Plus+
  - Ellas Vamos por Movistar Plus+
  - Golf por Movistar Plus+
  - LaLigaTV por Movistar Plus+
  - Liga de Campeones por Movistar Plus+
  - Vamos por Movistar Plus+
- Real Madrid TV
- Replay
- Teledeporte
- Top Barça

==== Former channels ====
- Barça TV
- ETB 4†
- Movistar eSports

=== Sweden ===
==== Current channels ====
- Eurosport (Sweden)
  - Eurosport 1
  - Eurosport 2
- TV4 Sport (Sweden)
  - TV4 Sportkanalen
  - TV4 Fotboll
  - TV4 Hockey
  - TV4 Motor
  - TV4 Tennis
  - TV4 Sport Live
- V Sport (Sweden)
  - V Sport 1
  - V Sport Extra
  - V Sport Football
  - V Sport Golf
  - V Sport Live
  - V Sport Motor
  - V Sport Premium
  - V Sport Ultra
  - V Sport Vinter
  - Viaplay Sport

==== Former channels ====
- C More Tennis
- TV4 Sport
- V Sport Hockey
- Viasat Sport 2
- Viasat Sport 3
- Viasat Sport 24

=== Switzerland ===
==== Current channels ====
† – Channel primarily televises others types of entertainment channels, only offers sports part-time

- 3+ Adrenalin†
- Blue Sport (Switzerland)
  - Blue Sport D 1
  - Blue Sport D 2
  - Blue Sport F
  - Blue Sport Live (1-25)
  - Blue Sport Direct (1-25)
- Blue Zoom
- Canal+ Sport (Switzerland)
  - Canal+ Sport 360
  - Canal+ Foot
  - Canal+ Live (1-19)
- DAZN (Switzerland)
  - DAZN Fast+
  - DAZN Rise
- Eurosport (Switzerland)
  - Eurosport 1
  - Eurosport 2
- MySports (Switzerland)
  - MySports 1
  - MySports 2
  - MySports 3
  - MySports 4
  - MySports 5
  - MySports 6
  - MySports 7
  - MySports 8
  - MySports 9
  - MySports 10
  - MySports EDGE
- Sky Sport (Switzerland)
  - Sky Sport News
  - Sky Sport Top Event
  - Sky Sport Bundesliga
  - Sky Sport F1
  - Sky Sport Premier League
  - Sky Sport Mix
  - Sky Sport Tennis
  - Sky Sport Golf
  - Sky Sport NFL
- Sport1 (Germany)
  - Sport1 Motor
- Sportdigital (Switzerland)
  - Sportdigital Free
  - Sportdigital Scooore
- SuperTennis
- Swiss Sport TV
- Wedo Sports

==== Former channels ====
- Ici Media Sports
- S Plus
- Schweizer Sportfernsehen

=== Turkey ===
==== Current channels ====
- A Spor
- beIN Sports (Turkey)
  - beIN Sports 1
  - beIN Sports 2
  - beIN Sports 3
  - beIN Sports 4
  - beIN Sports 5
  - beIN Sports Haber
  - beIN Sports Max (1-2)
- Bursaspor TV
- Ekol Sports
- Eurosport (Turkey)
  - Eurosport 1
  - Eurosport 2
- Fenerbahçe TV
- Fight Network
- Galatasaray TV
- HT Spor
- NBA TV
- Spor Smart (Turkey)
  - Spor Smart 2 (including HD)
- Sportstv
- S Sport (Turkey)
  - S Sport 1
  - S Sport 2
  - S Sport Plus
- TAY TV (horse racing)
- Tivibu Spor (Turkey & Northern Cyprus)
  - Tivibu Spor 1
  - Tivibu Spor 2
  - Tivibu Spor 3
  - Tivibu Spor 4
- TJK TV (horse racing)
- TRT Spor (Turkey)
  - TRT 3 Spor
  - TRT Spor Yıldız

==== Former channels ====
- Beşiktaş TV
- D Spor
- NTV Spor
- Supersport

=== Ukraine ===
==== Current channels ====
- Cars & Stars TV
- DiviSport
- Equalympic
- Eurosport (Ukraine)
  - Eurosport 1
  - Eurosport 2
- Megogo Sport
- Ruh TV
- Setanta Sports (Eurasia)
  - Setanta Sports 1
  - Setanta Sports 2
- Sport 1 (Ukraine)
  - Sport 2
  - Sport 3
  - Sport 4
  - Sport 1 Baltic
  - Sport 2 Baltic
- Suspilne Sport
- XSPORT (Ukraine)
  - XSPORT +

==== Former channels ====
- Football 1/Football 2

=== United Kingdom ===
==== Current channels ====
- DAZN (United Kingdom)
  - DAZN Ringside
- Extreme Sports Channel
- Ginx TV
- LFC TV
- MUTV (Manchester United F.C.)
- NBA TV
- Premier Sports (United Kingdom)
  - Premier Sports 1
  - Premier Sports 2
- Racing TV
- Sport24
  - Sport24 Extra (For Flight or Cruise)
- Sky Sports (United Kingdom)
  - Sky Sports Main Event
  - Sky Sports Premier League
  - Sky Sports Football
  - Sky Sports Cricket
  - Sky Sports Golf
  - Sky Sports F1
  - Sky Sports Action
  - Sky Sports +
  - Sky Sports Tennis
  - Sky Sports Racing
  - Sky Sports Mix
  - Sky Sports News
  - Sky Sports Box Office
  - Sky Sports Stories
  - Sky Sports Classics
- TNT Sports (United Kingdom)
  - TNT Sports 1
  - TNT Sports 2
  - TNT Sports 3
  - TNT Sports 4
  - TNT Sports Box Office
  - TNT Sports Ultimate

==== Former channels ====
- Arsenal TV
- BoxNation
- BT Sport
- Chelsea TV
- ESPN America
- ESPN Classic
- ESPN UK
- Eleven Sports UK and Ireland
- Eurosport 1
- Eurosport 2
- Fight+
- Front Runner
- ITV Sport Channel
- PremPlus
- The Racing Channel
- Setanta Golf
- Setanta Sports
- Setanta Sports News
- Sportystuff
- Viaplay Xtra (former name FreeSports)

== Oceania ==
=== Australia ===
==== Current channels ====
- beIN Sports (Australia)
  - beIN Sports 1
  - beIN Sports 2
  - beIN Sports 3
- Cricket Gold
- ESPN (Australia)
  - ESPN 2
  - ESPN 3
- Eurosport (Australia)
- Fox Sports (Australia)
  - Fox Sports News (Fox Sports 500) (including HD)
  - Fox Cricket (Fox Sports 501) (including HD)
  - Fox League (Fox Sports 502) (including HD)
  - Fox Sports 503 (including HD)
  - Fox Footy (Fox Sports 504) (including HD)
  - Fox Sports 505 (including HD)
  - Fox Sports 506 (including HD)
  - Fox Sports More+ (Fox Sports 507) (including HD)
  - Fox Sports 508 (including HD)
- Fuel TV
- Horse & Country TV
- Kayo Sports
- Main Event
- MTRSPT1 (motorsport)
- Motorsport Australia
- Racing.com
- Red Bull TV
- Skuff TV
- Sky Racing (Australia)
  - Sky Racing 1
  - Sky Racing 2
- Stan Sport
- Surfer

==== Former channels ====
- Fox Netball (Fox Sports 505) (including HD)
- Optus Sport (Australia)
  - Optus Sport 1
  - Optus Sport 2
  - Optus Sport 3
  - Optus Sport 4
  - Optus Sport 5
  - Optus Sport 6

=== Fiji ===
- FBC Sports

=== New Caledonia ===
- Automoto La chaîne
- Canal+Sport (France & New Caledonia)
  - Canal+ Sport 360
  - Canal+ Foot
  - Canal+ Premier League
  - Canal+ Live (1-18)
- Cheval TV (horse racing)
- beIN Sports (France & New Caledonia)
  - beIN Sports 1
  - beIN Sports 2
  - beIN Sports 3
  - beIN Sports Max 4
  - beIN Sports Max 5
- DAZN (France & New Caledonia)
  - DAZN 1
  - DAZN 2
  - DAZN 3
  - DAZN 4
  - DAZN 5
- Eurosport (France & New Caledonia)
  - Eurosport 1
  - Eurosport 2
- Equidia
- Golf Channel
- Infosport+
- La Chaîne L'Équipe
- Punch TV (combat sports)
- Sport en France
- Trek
- W-Sport

=== New Zealand ===
==== Current channels ====
- beIN Sports
- DAZN
- ESPN (New Zealand)
  - ESPN 2
  - ESPN 3
- Sky Sport (New Zealand)
  - Sky Sport Select
  - Sky Sport 1
  - Sky Sport 2
  - Sky Sport 3
  - Sky Sport 4
  - Sky Sport 5
  - Sky Sport 6
  - Sky Sport 7
  - Sky Sport Premier League
  - Sky Sport 9

==== Former channels ====
- TVNZ Sport Extra
- The Rugby Channel
- Spark Sport

=== Papua New Guinea ===
- TVWAN Sports
- TVWAN Sports 2
- ESPN Pacific Rim
- Fight Sports
- Premier League TV

== See also ==
- Regional sports network
