= Boom Extrasatelit =

Defunct Romanian satellite television provider and broadcaster

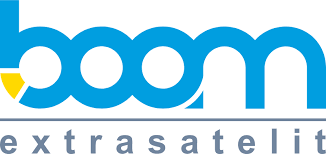
- Type: Private
- Industry: Telecommunication
- Founded: 28 March 2004; 22 years ago
- Defunct: 2011 (radiated since 18 January 2018)
- Fate: Acquired by Romtelecom (now Telekom Romania Communications)
- Headquarters: Bucharest, Romania
- Products: Direct broadcast satellite and television channels
- Website: www.boomtv.ro

Boom Extrasatelit, also known as Boom TV and operated as DTH Television Group SA, was a Romanian satellite television company and television broadcaster. Founded in 2004 by Israeli investors, the company began testing satellite television transmissions on the Amos satellite on 21 December 2005. The service was officially launched in April 2006 under the name Boom TV. It was the only television service in Romania to offer a selection of television channels in thematic packages. It also provided up to 10 own exclusive television channels, including Boom Sport channels, alongside channels for movies, children's shows and music, as well as the first pay-per-view film service.

In 2007, the service was rebranded as Boom Extrasatelit. By 2009, it had an estimated 240,000 subscribers. However, the company faced financial difficulties and went into insolvency in May 2010. By March 2011, its customer base had been transferred to Dolce TV, a service provided by Romtelecom, which later became Telekom Romania and then merged with Orange Romania.
