= Premier Sports Asia =

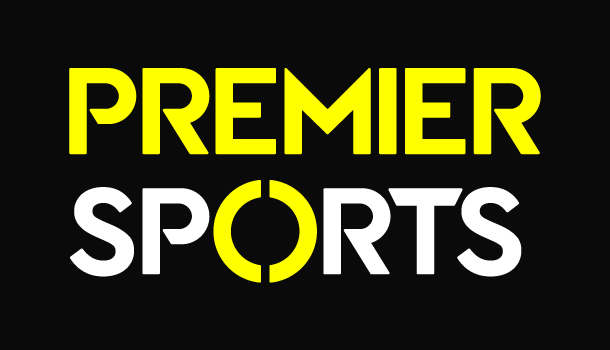
- Country: Ireland
- Broadcast area: Asia (Bangladesh, Bhutan, Brunei, Cambodia, Hong Kong, India, Indonesia, Laos, Macau, Malaysia, Maldives, Mongolia, Myanmar, Nepal, Pakistan, Philippines, Singapore, South Korea, Sri Lanka, Taiwan, Thailand, Vietnam)

Programming
- Language: English
- Picture format: 1080i HDTV

Ownership
- Owner: Premier Media Broadcasting

History
- Launched: 22 October 2020

Links
- Website: www.premiersportsasia.com

Availability

Terrestrial
- Astro (Malaysia): Channel 833 (HD)
- Dialog TV (Sri Lanka): Channel 125 (HD)

Streaming media
- Premier Player: Watch live

Premier Sports Asia is a pay television sports channel operating in the Asia Pacific region owned by Premier Media Broadcasting. It primarily airs the sport of rugby union.

== History ==
The channel, a sister channel of Irish-based Premier Sports, was launched on 22 October 2020 as an over-the-top (OTT) streaming channel for Asia. At its launch, the channel takes over the rights of Six Nations Championship and Autumn Nations Cup from Rugby Pass TV. Premier Sports Asia completed the takeover of all Rugby Pass customers on 31 July 2021.

== Availability ==
As of 29 December 2021, Premier Sports Asia is available as OTT subscription channels (branded as Premier Sports 1, Premier Sports 2 and Premier Sports 3) in over 16 Asian countries (Bhutan, Brunei, Cambodia, Hong Kong, Indonesia, Laos, Macau, Malaysia, Maldives, Mongolia, Myanmar, Philippines, Singapore, South Korea, Sri Lanka, Taiwan, Thailand, Vietnam). The channel is also available as a traditional linear channel (branded as Premier Sports) in Hong Kong, Singapore, Indonesia, Thailand, Sri Lanka and Malaysia, replacing the Rugby Pass TV channel in late 2021.

== Coverage ==
=== Rugby union ===
- International tests
  - Autumn Nations Cup
  - 2021 British & Irish Lions tour to South Africa
  - Autumn rugby union internationals
  - Mid-year rugby union internationals
- Guinness Men's 6 Nations Championship (from 2020)
- The Rugby Championship (from 2021)
- Smartech Super Rugby Pacific presented by DHL
- Gallagher PREM Rugby
- United Rugby Championship
- Bunnings NPC

=== Rugby league ===
- Betfred Super League
- NRL Telstra Premiership
- Ampol State of Origin

=== Australian Rules football ===
- AFL Toyota Premiership

== See also ==
- Setanta Sports Asia
- Premier Sports
