= A Bola =

Portuguese daily sports newspaper

- Type: Daily newspaper
- Format: Tabloid
- Owner: Ringier
- Editor-in-chief: Luís Pedro Ferreira
- Founded: 29 January 1945; 81 years ago
- Language: Portuguese
- Headquarters: Lisbon
- ISSN: 0870-1776
- Website: abola.pt

A Bola (Portuguese pronunciation: [ɐ ˈβɔlɐ]; English: literally 'The Ball', in this context "The Game of Football") is a Portuguese sports newspaper published in Lisbon.

== History and profile ==
A Bola was founded in 1945 by Cândido de Oliveira, Ribeiro dos Reis and Vicente de Melo and was then published twice a week. It became a daily newspaper in 1995. Although its subtitle is "newspaper of all sports", its content is mainly about football. Since the 1952–53 season, it hands the Bota de Prata award to the Primeira Liga's top goalscorer.

It is the most popular newspaper among Portuguese emigrants abroad and is widely read in the former Portuguese colonies in Africa. From 2006, it is also printed in Newark, New Jersey, an American city with a large Portuguese population.

In 2012, they launched the television channel A Bola TV.

In 2023, Ringier Sports Media Group acquired the company.

== Player of the Year ==
	Player	Club
2017	Jonas	Benfica

== See also ==
- List of newspapers in Portugal
