= Eleven Sports UK and Ireland =

Streaming service

Eleven Sports UK & Ireland
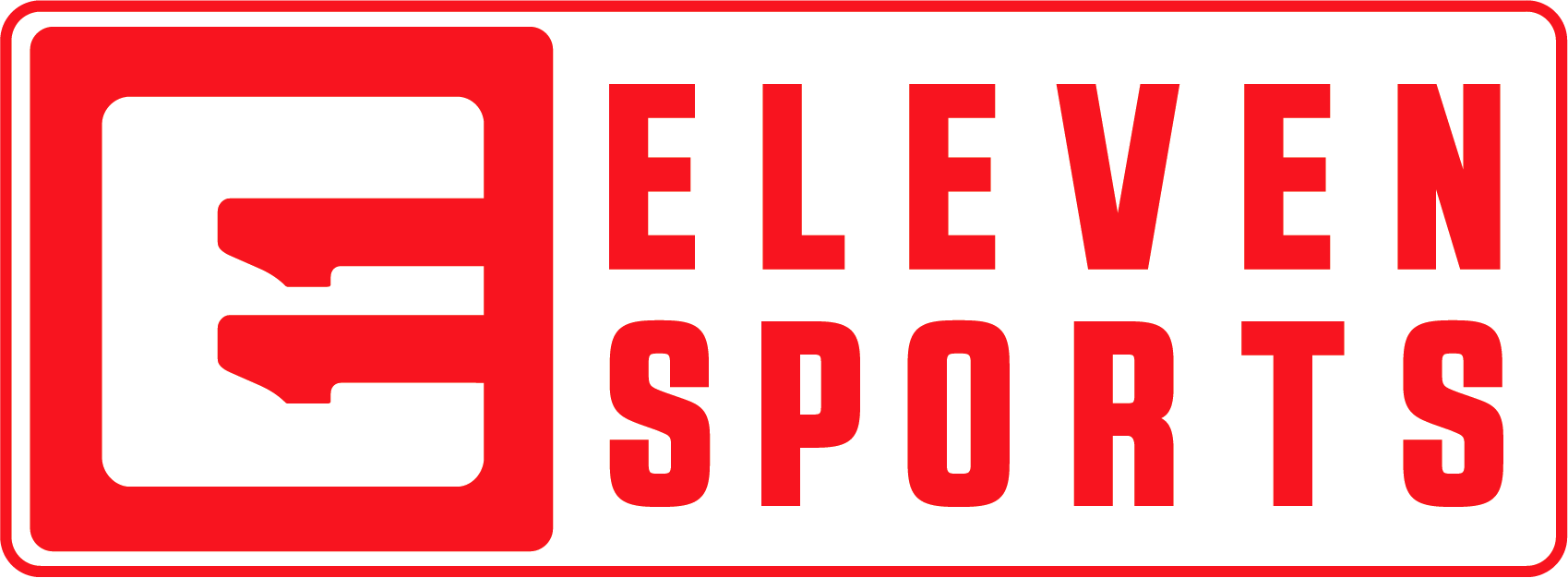
- Broadcast area: United Kingdom; Ireland
- Network: Eleven Sports

History
- Launched: August 2018
- Closed: 2019

Links
- Website: elevensports.uk

Eleven Sports UK & Ireland was a video streaming service that launched in August 2018. It was part of the Eleven Sports Group which was owned by Andrea Radrizzani.

== History ==
In May 2018, Eleven Sports secured a three-year deal to broadcast La Liga football matches in the UK and Ireland. Two months later, they secured UK three-year deals to screen Serie A matches, the Eredivisie and the Chinese Super League and Sweden's Allsvenskan.

Eleven Sports launched in the UK & Ireland with rights to the 2018 U.S. PGA. Eleven then signed for coverage of six LPGA tour events. Eleven Sports is currently in discussions with traditional television platforms about the possibility of launching linear channels and/or providing access to the Eleven Sports app.

The network faced criticism for defying the FA's blackout rules—which prohibit the telecast of any football match between 2:45 p.m. and 5:15 p.m on Saturday matchdays—by streaming selected La Liga and Serie A matches. On 17 October 2018 Eleven Sports stated that it would no longer do so, but argued that the rules were outdated and encouraged illegal streaming. Representatives of the two leagues have supported Eleven Sports' position.

In November 2018, Eleven partnered with STV Group for it to become its digital advertising sales partner. As part of the partnership, STV Player also gained rights to stream selected La Liga and Serie A matches from Eleven within Scotland.

Eleven had announced an acquisition of rights to UFC mixed martial arts beginning January 2019. However, after Eleven failed to meet required targets for distribution, the promotion invoked an exit clause and renewed with BT Sport instead. It was also reported that the broadcaster was attempting to renegotiate some of its rights contracts at lower costs in order to sustain its business.

In January 2019, Eleven Sports dropped its rights to Serie A and Eredivisie football, passing on the rights to Premier Sports. Premier Sports also won the rights to the Chinese Super League and Swedish Allsvenskan, leaving Eleven with exclusive La Liga, Segunda Division play-offs, Copa del Rey, and Supercopa rights until at least the end of the season. Later in 2019 Eleven Sports closed its UK broadcast operations with Radrizzani later admitting that the attempt to expand into United Kingdom was a "mistake", as it was difficult to compete with or secure cooperation from the existing duopoly of Sky and BT.

== Summary of past sports rights 2018-2019 ==
=== Football ===
Competition	Region	Broadcast Details
La Liga	(Spain)	Live coverage of all games for three years for 2018-19 season
Segunda División	(Spain)	Live coverage of 6 play-offs in 2018-19 season. 4 semi-finals and both finals.
Copa del Rey	(Spain)	Live coverage of 5 matches in 2018-19 season. 4 semi-finals and a final.
Serie A	(Italy)	Live coverage until matchday 25 only in 2018-19 season.
Eredivisie	(Netherlands)	Live coverage until matchday 23 only in 2018-19 season.
DFB-Pokal	(Germany)	Exclusive coverage until the quarter finals in 2018-2019 season.

==== Club content ====
- (Spain) La Liga TV

=== Golf ===
Event	Country	Broadcast Details
US PGA Championship	(United States)	Live and exclusive coverage in 2018

== See also ==
- Sports broadcasting
- Eleven Sports Network
- STV
- BT Sport
- Eurosport
- Sky Sports
- Sport TV
