= A Bola TV =

- Country: Portugal
- Broadcast area: Portugal; Angola; Mozambique; Cape Verde; Canada

Programming
- Picture format: 16:9 (HDTV and SDTV)

Ownership
- Owner: Sociedade Vicra Desportiva

History
- Launched: October 12, 2012

Links
- Website: www.abolatv.pt

A Bola TV is a Portuguese basic fiber and satellite television channel. It's a sports channel owned by the same company that owns the Portuguese sport newspaper A Bola, read in Portugal, the Portuguese diaspora and in Portuguese-speaking Africa. The content is mostly about football, but have many other sports, even some F1 shows.

The channel appeared after an agreement between Sociedade Vicra Desportiva and MEO and it had an exclusivity contract with that platform. While limited in Portugal, it's widely available in Africa.

One June 6, 2023, the channel, alongside its parent newspaper, was sold to Ringier Sports Media Group, the values of the transaction were not revealed.

On July 16, 2025, the channel launched on the NOS platform.

== Broadcasting rights ==
=== Football ===
- Campeonato de Portugal Prio
- (India) Hero I league
- (Lithuania) A Lyga

=== Futsal ===
- (Spain) LNFS

=== Handball ===
- (Portugal) Andebol 1 (Except Benfica, Sporting and FC Porto's home matches)

=== Basketball ===
- (Portugal) Liga Portuguesa de Basquetebol
