= NBA Africa =

National Basketball Association branch

- Industry: Sports (Basketball)
- Founded: 2021
- Headquarters: Block 3, Fenbridge Office Park, Randburg, 2194, Johannesburg, South Africa
- Parent: National Basketball Association

NBA Africa is the African branch of the U.S.-based National Basketball Association (NBA) basketball league organization, which focuses on its business interests on the African continent. The entity was established in 2021 and co-organizes the Basketball Africa League (BAL), together with FIBA, among other activities.

NBA Africa opened NBA Kenya to help with achieving their goal in the continent.

In 2023 NBA Africa opened NBA Egypt office in Cairo Led by Mr. Mohamed Abdel-Motaleb Soliman as NBA Africa Vice President-Head of NBA Egypt

== History ==
The National Basketball Association (NBA) had already been active on the continent, and opened its first African office in Johannesburg, South Africa, in 2010. The league had already established a youth academy with the NBA Academy Africa, which opened in 2017, and is located in Senegal. The NBA organized exhibition games in Africa in 2015, 2017 and 2018, with African players competing in the friendly games.

The initial strategic investors included the Yinka Folawiyo Group, Helios Fairfax Partners Corporation (HFP), and Helios Investment Partners. Other investors include former NBA players Joakim Noah, Luol Deng and Grant Hill, among others. Former U.S. president Barack Obama is a minority partner and strategic advisor for the organization. The NBA valued the organization at $1 billion in 2021.

NBA Africa has since then opened offices in Nairobi, Kenya,

NBA Africa opened NBA Egypt office in Cairo 2023 and Two NBA Official Merchandise Stores in Cairo, NBA Egypt is led by Former Egyptian Basketball Legend Mr. Mohamed Abdel-Motaleb Soliman as NBA Africa Vice President-Head of NBA Egypt.

First National Basketball Association (NBA) Basketball School in Africa to Launch in Cairo Egypt. NBA Africa and New Era Education, a Cairo-based educational services and school management company that seeks to bring high-quality educational institutions to Egypt to provide Egyptian students ages 5–18 with the best possible education opportunities, Uppingham School Cairo an international school in New Giza, Egypt. The year-round, tuition-based basketball development program will cover on-court training, skill development and basketball education for all skill levels. Also investing in outdoor courts as well as the construction and renovation of indoor arenas.
