= Schweizer Sportfernsehen =

Swiss TV network

Schweizer Sportfernsehen (SSF) is a Swiss private TV broadcaster specialized in sport events. SSF was founded in 2007 and started broadcasting on July 1, 2009. In 2013 it was relaunched as SportSzene fernsehen (SSf), allowing more variety to the program by adding cultural and economical aspects.

== Program ==
- Monday Evening: "Kick it!" hosted by Claudia Lässer and Jörg Stiel
- Monday Evening: Live "Challenge League" (Fussball)
- Tuesday Evening: "SSF-Magazin" hosted by Vania Spescha
- Wednesday Evening: "Volleyball NLA"
- Thursday Evening: "SportWoche" hosted by Gabriel Oldham
- Sunday Evening: "Outlaws" hosted by Gian Simmen
