= Canal del Deporte Olímpico =

Chilean Olympic sports TV channel

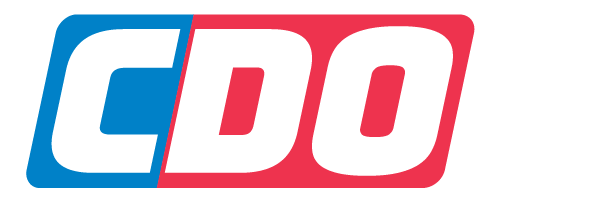
Logo

Canal del Deporte Olímpico or CDO is a privately owned sports pay TV channel of Chile. Is the channel of the Chilean Olympic Committee.

== See also ==
- List of Chilean television channels
