= Orange Sport (Romania) =

Romanian sports television channels

- Country: Romania
- Headquarters: Bucharest

Programming
- Picture format: 1080i HDTV (downscaled to 16:9 576i for the SDTV feeds)

Ownership
- Owner: Orange Romania (2021-2024)

History
- Launched: 11 November 2006 (Boom Sport); 13 August 2010 (Dolce Sport); 12 September 2017 (Telekom Sport); 28 March 2022 (Orange Sport)
- Closed: 30 June 2024
- Former names: Boom Sport (2006-2010); Dolce Sport (2010–2017); Telekom Sport (2017–2022)

Links
- Website: www.orangesport.ro

Orange Sport (formerly Boom Sport, Dolce Sport and Telekom Sport) was a group of Romanian sports television channels owned by Orange Romania and available exclusively to its television subscribers.

The first channel was launched on 11 November 2006 by satellite television broadcaster Boom Extrasatelit. After the company became insolvent, satellite television subscribers and sports channels were sold to Romtelecom, which rebranded the channels as Dolce Sport on 13 August 2010. After rebranding of Romtelecom to Telekom, it was rebranded as Telekom Sport on 12 September 2017. After Orange Romania acquired Telekom Romania in 2021, which included its fixed-line services, the sports television channels were rebranded to Orange Sport on 28 March 2022.

The group of television channels owned the rights to broadcast the NBA in Romania from its launch in 2006 until its closure on 30 June 2024.

Boom Sport One logo

== Sport competitions ==
- Liga I
- UEFA Champions League
- UEFA Europa League
- UEFA Europa Conference League
- UEFA Super Cup
- UEFA Youth League
- Premier League
- La Liga
- La Liga 2
- Serie A
- Ligue 1
- Bundesliga
- Formula One
- Formula Two
- Formula Three
- Porsche Supercup
- WRC
- NBA
- NHL
- NFL
- UEFA Futsal Champions League
- Six Nations
- Rugby World Cup
- World Men's Handball Championship
- World Women's Handball Championship
- European Men's Handball Championship
- European Women's Handball Championship
- EHF Champions League
- EHF European League
- EHF European Cup
- Women's EHF Champions League
- Women's EHF European League
- Women's EHF European Cup
