= Bursaspor TV =

- Country: Turkey
- Broadcast area: Turkey
- Headquarters: Bursa, Turkey

Programming
- Language(s): Turkish
- Picture format: 576i (4:3 SDTV)

Ownership
- Owner: Bursaspor

History
- Launched: 12 June 2009; 15 years ago

Links
- Website: http://www.bursasportv.com/

Bursaspor TV is a sports channel of Bursa based multi sports team Bursaspor. The channel was launched in 2009 over satellite network services, cable service and streaming.

The television offers Bursaspor fans exclusive interviews with players and staff, full matches, including replays of all Süper Lig, Turkish Cup, and UEFA Cup games, in addition to vintage matches, footballing news, and other themed programming.

== Commentators/Presenters ==
- Koray Kundakçılar
- Vedat Aslan
- Meltem Günaydın
- Saner Özgünay
- Ece Değirmenci
- Tolgahan Aydınlılar
- Erhan Tamiş
- Türker Kırpar
- Şenol Ulusavaş

== Programs in Turkish ==
- Spor Merkezi
- Taraftarın Sesi
- Santra
- Haftaya Bakış
- Vizyondakiler
- Nereden Nereye
- O Maç
- Serbest Atış
- Gündem Dışı
- Haftanın Maçı
- Maç Günü
- Maçın Öyküsü
- Dünden Bugüne
- Vakıfköy Gündemi
- Çizgi Film Kuşağı
- Sağlıklı Günler
- Özlüce Günlüğü
