= SuperTennis =

- Country: Italy
- Broadcast area: Italy, reaching bordering regions via overspill of the Italian terrestrial network

Programming
- Picture format: SDTV, HDTV

Ownership
- Owner: Sportcast S.r.l.

History
- Launched: November 10, 2008

Links
- Website: Supertennis.tv

Availability

Terrestrial
- Digital: DVB-T, LCN 64

SuperTennis is an Italian terrestrial and satellite television channel broadcasting tennis live of the Italian Tennis Federation.

Among the various events broadcasts the US Open, WTA 125, ATP Challenger.

== See also ==
- Television in Italy
- Digital terrestrial television in Italy
- Sky Italia
