= Total Sports TV =

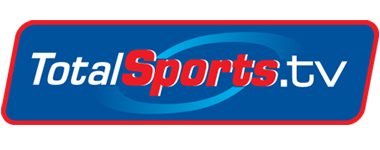
- Headquarters: Malaysia

Ownership
- Owner: Total Sports Asia

History
- Launched: July 2009

Links
- Website: http://www.totalsports.tv

Total Sports TV is an online live sports streaming channel that is a partnership between Total Sports Asia and Octopus Media Technology. The channel was launched in July 2009 serving live sports content like the Thomas Cup & Uber Cup, Badminton World Championships and US Open Tennis. Its existing live streaming rights are restricted in selected territories. In 2011, Total Sports TV will stream the Badminton Super Series and AIBA Boxing worldwide.

== 2010 Badminton Thomas & Uber Cup ==
From 9 May 2010 to 16 May 2010, Total Sports TV streamed the Thomas Cup and Uber Cup badminton matches live on its platform, serving to Badminton fans in Asia. It also provided a live commentary service from the venue itself to its subscribers.

== 2010 Badminton World Championships ==
Total Sports TV streamed the 2010 Badminton World Championships in Paris from 23 August 2010 to 29 August 2010 to selected territories in Asia. The live streaming service was provided for free in the early stages of the tournament with a subscription of USD1.99 charged from quarterfinals onwards. The site generated over 33,000 unique visitors, with 248,000 pageviews, generating over 6000 new subscribers.

Available Territories: Singapore, Malaysia, Brunei, Thailand, Indonesia, Philippines, Vietnam, China, Hong Kong, Macao, Taiwan, India, Nepal, Pakistan, Sri Lanka, Bangladesh, Uzbekistan, Saudi Arabia, United Arab Emirates, Kuwait, Jordan, Bahrain, Dubai, Iran, Iraq, Oman, Lebanon, Qatar, Yemen, Australia, New Zealand, South Korea.

== Video On Demand Content ==
Also available are on-demand programming that includes Air sports, Professional Arm Wrestling League, D1 Grand Prix, Aero GP, IBUKI Pro Wrestling, Double Dutch Jump Rope, Adventure Race World Championship Portugal, Badminton Archives, Muay Thai, Euro Hockey League Final Four, Superleague Formula, Asia-Pacific Rally Championship, professional bodybuilding, Powerboat P1 Superstock Championship and martial arts.
