= V Sport Jääkiekko =

Finnish pay television channel

- Country: United Kingdom
- Broadcast area: Finland
- Network: V Sport

Programming
- Language(s): Finnish; English
- Picture format: 1080i HDTV (downscaled to 16:9 576i for the SDTV feed)

Ownership
- Owner: Nordic Entertainment Group
- Sister channels: Viasat Urheilu; Viasat Jalkapallo

History
- Launched: 1 August 2016
- Replaced: Viasat Sport Finland

Availability

Terrestrial
- DNA: Channel 120; Channel 63 (SD)

V Sport Jääkiekko (Finnish for "Ice Hockey") is a pay television channel distributed in Finland, produced by Nordic Entertainment Group-owned Viasat, and primarily covering two major professional ice hockey leagues, the National Hockey League and the Kontinental Hockey League. The channel's major live broadcasts are usually presented in Finnish, although for the NHL games, the original English-language commentary from the North American feed is generally transmitted in a separate audio channel. Additionally, the channel rebroadcasts the NHL Network programming in English.

The channel was launched on August 1, 2016, after Viasat's Finnish-language sports channel, Viasat Sport Finland (formerly named Viasat Hockey Finland) has been replaced with three specialized channels, the other two being Viasat Urheilu and Viasat Jalkapallo. Besides Viasat's own satellite service, Viasat Jääkiekko is also available in the terrestrial network in Mainland Finland and through most cable and satellite providers in the country. The associate Viasat Jääkiekko package available through the pay TV ppay-TVrs generally additionally includes the channels Viasat Urheilu, the Swedish-language Viasat Hockey and Viasat Sport, and five Viasat Xtra channels used to simultaneously show further NHL games.

In 2020, the channel has been renamed from Viasat Jääkiekko to V Sport Jääkiekko.
