= MS Motor TV =

Italian television channel

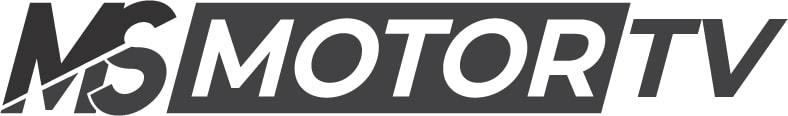
- Country: Italy

Programming
- Language(s): Italian
- Picture format: 576i (4:3 SDTV)

Ownership
- Owner: Mediasport Group S.p.A

History
- Launched: 29 September 2012; 12 years ago
- Former names: Auto TV, Moto TV (2007–2012); Automoto TV (2012–2020)

Links
- Website: msmotor.tv

MS Motor TV is an Italian television channel devoted to cars and motorcycles. It is owned by Mediasport Group S.p.A. and available on Sky Italia and Tivùsat.

== History ==
In 2007, MotoTV was started as a channel on Sky Italia devoted to motorcycle sports with dedicated programming. It was followed in early 2012 with Auto TV, which was free-to-air on digital terrestrial television.

On 29 September 2012, the two channels merged into Automoto TV. Mediasport acquired the channel in 2018 and renamed it MS Motor TV in 2020 as part of a rebranding of its four channels.
