= Sports team channels =

Sporting teams around the world use subscription TV channels to promote their brand and team to new and current fans. The ability for sports teams to produce their own television channels requires a significant amount of money and is usually only restricted to large clubs with large amounts of profit such as Manchester United and Barcelona.

Sports team channels on television by the following teams:

== France ==
- Olympique Lyonnais - OL Play

== Australia ==
=== NRL ===
- St George Illawarra Dragons – Dragons TV
- Gold Coast Titans – Titans TV

=== AFL ===
- Hawthorn Hawks- Hawks TV

== Canada ==
- Toronto Raptors (NBA)- Raptors TV
- Toronto Maple Leafs (NHL)- Leafs TV

== England ==
=== Premier League ===
- Manchester United – MUTV 1998–
- Middlesbrough FC – Boro TV 1997–2002
- Chelsea – Chelsea TV
- Arsenal – Arsenal TV 2008–2009
- Liverpool – LFC TV

== Portugal ==
- FC Porto (Primeira Liga) – Porto Canal
- SL Benfica (Primeira Liga) – Benfica TV
- Sporting CP (Primeira Liga) – Sporting TV

== Scotland ==
=== Scottish Premier League ===
- Celtic – Celtic TV 2004–2005
- Rangers – Rangers TV 2004–2009

== Spain ==
- Barcelona (La Liga)- Barca TV
- Real Madrid (La Liga) – Real Madrid TV

== United States ==
In the United States, several regional sports networks are owned by teams, either fully or partially or.

Los Angeles Lakers (NBA)- Lakers TV

New York Yankees (MLB)- YES Network

Chicago Cubs (MLB)- Marquee Sports Network

== Egypt ==
- Zamalek Sporting Club (Egyptian Premier League) – Zamalek TV
