= Ali Shaw =

Scottish television presenter

Alison Shaw (née Douglas) is a Scottish television presenter, who has appeared on ITV News, Sky Sports and MUTV.

== Broadcasting career ==
Shaw started her television career with STV's children's department. She also presented current affairs programmes Seven Days and Trial By Night, travel show Scottish Passport, and property programme Safe As Houses.

In August 2009, she became the first female to anchor live coverage of the Scottish Premier League, on Sky Sports.

Shaw has presented on Sky Sports News, and its former rival channel Setanta Sports News, as well as hosting basketball on Setanta Sports. She has also had stints presenting on Rangers TV, Arsenal TV and Middlesbrough TV. In December 2009, she co-hosted the Scottish Sports Awards on STV, while in July 2010 she presented Sky Sports' coverage of Fish-O-Mania, the UK's biggest angling event. In October 2010, she presented her first national news, ITV News at 5:30. On 27 July 2012 she presented the news on Daybreak, ITV's former breakfast programme.

Shaw currently presents Countdown to Kick off on Manchester United's TV channel, MUTV, and tennis on Sky Sports.

== Writing ==
Shaw had been a columnist for newspapers, including the Evening Times, Daily Record and Sunday Post. She also wrote a blog on Scottish football for the Sky Sports website.

On 14 March 2018, Shaw's book Beautiful Chaos: A Life Worth Living with Bipolar was released; a frank account of her past, including taking drugs, binge drinking, depression and being diagnosed with bipolar.

== Acting ==
In her early career, Shaw had lead roles appeared in several Scottish pantomimes.

== Personal life ==
In her spare time, she is a keen horse rider, and has taken part in races for charity. She also has an interest in property and has built up her own portfolio.
