= Setanta Golf =

Ownership
- Owner: Setanta Sports
- Sister channels: Arsenal TV; Celtic TV; ESPN America; LFC TV; Racing UK; Racing World; Rangers TV; Setanta Sports 1 Setanta Sports 2 Setanta Ireland; Setanta Sports News

History
- Launched: 11 January 2007
- Closed: 23 June 2009

Links
- Website: www.setanta.com

Setanta Golf was a British television channel from Setanta Sports dedicated to the sport of golf.

== History ==
The channel was launched on 11 January 2007 on Sky Digital channel 429. In July 2007, the channel was added to Virgin Media channel 543, being available for free for XL pack subscribers or a premium network on other Virgin Media packages. In September 2007, the channel was added to Tiscali TV channel 557. The channel was also available in the Republic of Ireland on UPC Ireland and Sky Ireland.

The channel closed on 23 June 2009 with the rest of Setanta's networks, following the broadcaster's financial difficulties and collapse into administration in the United Kingdom.

== Content ==
From its launch, the United States-based PGA Tour was the mainstay of Setanta Golf's programming schedule. The channel also included coverage of the over 50s Champions Tour. Other programs included The Big Break and Highway 18 from The Golf Channel, and Shell's Wonderful World of Golf. Many programming hours were also taken up with advertising features, mainly for JJB Sports licensed Slazenger and Nike products.

PGA Tour coverage started with the first two tournaments from Hawaii and included all the regular season tournaments except for the majors, for which the rights were held by BBC Sport and Sky.
