= Setanta Sports News =

- Country: Ireland; United Kingdom

Programming
- Picture format: 16:9, 576i (SDTV)

Ownership
- Owner: Virgin Media Television; Setanta Sports
- Sister channels: Arsenal TV; Celtic TV; ESPN America; LFC TV; Racing UK; Racing World; Rangers TV; Setanta Sports 1 Setanta Sports 2 Setanta Golf; Setanta Ireland

History
- Launched: 29 November 2007
- Closed: 23 June 2009

Links
- Website: www.setanta.com/uk/news

Setanta Sports News was a television channel from Virgin Media Television and Setanta Sports. The channel launched on 29 November 2007. as a rolling 24-hour sports news channel using the strength of the Setanta Sports brand across the United Kingdom and Ireland. It was available to all Virgin Media customers and also free-to-view on satellite and online. The channel was seen as Virgin Media's rival to Sky Sports News, which was removed from their platform on 1 March 2007 as their contract with British Sky Broadcasting had ended. However, when Virgin Media reinstated Sky Sports News onto their television platform, their Setanta rival remained an active channel.

It was announced on 12 September 2007 that ITN was appointed producer of Setanta Sports News.

The channel was transmitted by Red Bee Media, which also played in the commercial breaks.

The channel closed at just before 6pm on Tuesday 23 June 2009, following financial difficulties.

== History ==
Setanta Sports News was launched on 29 November 2007 on the Virgin Media and Sky Digital platforms. The Virgin Media Television network had previously expressed their interest in running a sports news channel, after BSkyB removed Sky Sports News from ntl:Telewest's successor Virgin Media. Media sources claimed that Setanta News was intended to be in direct competition with BSkyB's Sky Sports News, which has an average of around 0.6%. It was announced in the summer of 2007 that Virgin Media Television was to launch the new channel.

On 1 September 2008, the channel was given a new look. The format was changed from 4:3 to Widescreen. Viewers could see headlines along the length of the bottom of the screen, rather than across the top of the video section. There were other several minor changes, which also included the vidiprinter moving to a different part of the screen.

Over the course of the remainder of the year, channel producers experimented with different format designs, including removing the side bar over midweek.

== Closure ==
On 23 June 2009, it was announced Setanta Sports had been placed into administration after rescue talks to secure new funding collapsed. Setanta Sports News closed on the same day, at 18:00, with 60 staff made redundant.

== International coverage ==
From 1 January 2008, Setanta Sports News was broadcast live in one hour blocks on their domestic international stations in the Republic of Ireland (at 18:00 on Setanta Ireland), Australia, and the USA. In Australia, Setanta Sports News was shown live daily at 7am and 6pm EST (changing to 9am & 6pm EDT) and in the USA was shown live at 1am, 5pm, and 10pm ET.

== On air team ==
Person	Position at Setanta	Current position(s)
Matt Teale	Presenter	Co-presenter on ITV News Meridian
Lisa Knights	Presenter	Freelance broadcast journalist with Sky News
Andy Kerr	Presenter	Presenter beIN Sports USA and Asia
Kelly Cates	Presenter	Presenter for ESPN's Football Coverage
Rachel Brookes	Presenter	Reporter for Sky Sports News
Murray Dron	Presenter	Freelance broadcast journalist
Charlotte Jackson	Presenter	Presenter for Sky Sports News
Rhodri Williams	Presenter	Presenter for Al Jazeera Sport FA Cup Europa League Matches
Ali Douglas	Presenter	Freelance broadcast journalist ITV News London
Ashley House	Presenter	Sports Presenter, Al Jazeera English
Mark McQuillan	Freelance Reporter	ITV News
Amelia Harris	Freelance Presenter	Sports Presenter, BBC News channel
Alexandra Hill	Freelance Presenter	Freelance broadcast journalist
Jackie Kabler	Freelance Presenter	Freelance broadcast journalist
Sangeeta Kandola	Freelance Presenter	Presenter, 5 News and ITV News
Sue Thearle	Freelance	News Presenter, BBC News channel/BBC World News
Faye Barker	Freelance Presenter	Presenter, ITV News London and ITV News
Steve Clamp	Freelance Presenter	Presenter, ITV News Central
Steve Gaisford	Freelance Presenter	Runs online company
Chris Ford	Reporter	Football news reporter, Premier League Productions / Freelance broadcast journalist
David Chisnall	Reporter	Reporter, Now at ITV News Granada
Andrew Toft	Reporter	
Jamie Weir	Reporter	Reporter, Sky Sports News
Katie Bailey	Reporter	
Natalie Pirks	Reporter	Sports Reporter with BBC News
Zoe Gough	Reporter	Reporter for BBC Points West
David Warriner	Reporter	
Steven Godden	Reporter	Reporter, BBC Scotland
