= Setanta Sports Asia =

Asian pay television sports channel

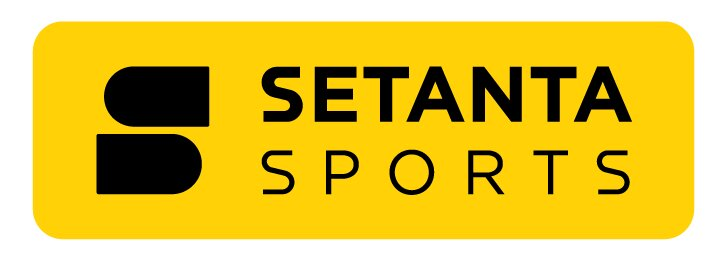
- Country: Singapore; Philippines
- Broadcast area: Philippines; Previous: Hong Kong, Indonesia, Malaysia, Brunei Darussalam, Singapore, Thailand, Sri Lanka, Mongolia, and Taiwan

Programming
- Language: English
- Picture format: 1080i HDTV

Ownership
- Owner: Eurasian Broadcasting Enterprise Ltd.
- Parent: Philippines: Setanta Sports Philippines Ltd.

History
- Launched: 1 February 2011; 3 November 2022 (Philippines; relaunch)
- Closed: 29 January 2020 (8 years, 11 months and 4 weeks)
- Replaced by: RugbyPass TV (2020); Premier Sports Asia (2021)

Links
- Website: setantasports.com

Availability

Terrestrial
- Cignal (Philippines): Channel 271

Streaming media
- YouTube: Watch Live (Philippines only; selected events only)

Setanta Sports Philippines Limited is a pay television sports channel and over-the-top streaming service operating in the Philippines owned by Eurasian Broadcasting Enterprise Ltd.

Originally broadcasting as Setanta Sports Asia, an Asian pay television sports channel operating in the Asia Pacific region owned by Discovery Communications. It primarily airs the sports of rugby union and rugby league. The channel was available on TV platforms in Hong Kong, Indonesia, Malaysia/Brunei, Singapore, Thailand, Sri Lanka, Mongolia, and Taiwan.

As of 2024, Setanta Sports is only available in the Philippines after the latter's owners (including founder Michael O’Rouke and Georgia-based Adjara Group) relaunched the platform in 2022 to sole exclusive broadcast rights for the Premier League.

== History ==
In February 2011, Setanta Sports Asia launched in Hong Kong on Now TV, and in Malaysia and Brunei on Astro. In June 2015, Setanta Sports in Dublin confirmed it has sold its Asian operations to Discovery Communications.

From 29 January 2020, Setanta Sports Asia has been replaced by the new dedicated rugby channel, Rugby Pass TV which launched its OTT service first, since February 2016. Rugby Pass was later shut down due to the effects of the COVID-19 pandemic, and Premier Sports Asia took over the acquisition of all Rugby Pass subscribers in 2021.

In November 2022, Setanta Sports founder Michael O'Rouke and Georgia-based Adjara Group jointly relaunched the brand as a linear channel and OTT platform in the Philippines after it obtained its broadcast exclusivity rights to the Premier League for the said country after the league's contract with local broadcaster TAP Digital Media Ventures Corporation was expired.

== Availability ==
Prior to its relaunch in the Philippines in 2022, the channel was available on the following platforms throughout Asia:

- In Hong Kong via Now TV
- In Indonesia via First Media, Big TV, and MNC Play
- In Malaysia and Brunei on Astro
- In Mongolia via Univision and Sky Media
- In the Philippines on SkyCable, Cignal
- In Thailand via TrueVisions
- In Singapore via Toggle
- In Sri Lanka via LBN, Dialog and SLT Peo TV
- In Taiwan via bbTV

Since 2022, Setanta Sports Philippines is available both as a linear channel and through video on demand on its official website and mobile application on a monthly subscription basis. In February 2024, Setanta Sports becomes available on local streaming service Blast TV. In March 2026, Setanta Sports became available on Cignal.

== Coverage ==
=== Current ===
Setanta Sports (Philippines) has broadcast rights to international sporting leagues, including:

Football

- Premier League
- La Liga

=== Past coverage ===
Setanta was the leading broadcaster of rugby in Asia, covering a variety of competitions from the Northern and Southern hemispheres. Setanta's former Rugby rights were:

==== Rugby league ====
- Super League
- RFL Championship
- National Rugby League (until 2017 season)

==== Rugby union ====
- International tests
- Six Nations Championship (2011–2013 on Setanta; Return in 2017)
- The Rugby Championship (formerly Tri-Nations)
- Super Rugby
- Pro14
- Premiership Rugby
- Ligue Nationale de Rugby
  - Top 14
  - Pro D2
- Mitre 10 Cup
- Currie Cup
- European Professional Club Rugby (2014–15 until 2017–18)
  - European Rugby Champions Cup
  - European Rugby Challenge Cup

==== GAA ====
Setanta provided coverage of the Gaelic Athletic Association football and hurling championships.

== See also ==
- Setanta Sports Eurasia
- Fox League
