= Racing TV =

- Country: United Kingdom
- Broadcast area: United Kingdom; Ireland

Programming
- Picture format: 16:9, 576i (SDTV); 1080i (HDTV)

Ownership
- Owner: 34 Racecourses

History
- Launched: 29 May 2004
- Former names: Racing UK (2004–2018)

Links
- Website: www.racingtv.com

Availability

Streaming media
- Racing TV Extra: https://www.racingtv.com/videos

Racing TV (formerly Racing UK) is a British television channel with 34 racecourses as shareholders and fixtures from 61 racecourses broadcast live on its output.

Racing TV is one of the two major UK horse racing television channels, the other being Sky Sports Racing. The station is dedicated to horse racing broadcasting over 70% of all live racing from Britain and Ireland, including nearly 90% of all Group and Graded races.

== History ==
Known as The Horse Racing Channel before launch, Racing UK soft-launched on 29 May 2004 on the Sky Digital channel iSports TV. Two months later on 16 July, the network entered into a partnership with Irish sports broadcaster Setanta Sports to officially launch the network in September, where Setanta would be the channel's broadcast partner and distributor. The channel officially launched on Sky Channel 432 on 1 September and remained on Channel 425 until the end of the month when the channel would become encrypted.

Racing UK was added to Telewest's Active Digital service on 15 September and later launched an online service. The channel launched on the NTL: Home digital cable platform in February 2005.

As Racing UK grew, several other business units and joint ventures were developed under the ownership of the parent company Racecourse Media Group Ltd.

On 17 August 2006, Racing UK entered into an expanded partnership with Setanta by merging its standalone subscription package of Racing UK and Racing World with Setanta's, allowing Setanta customers access to the channel and Racing World, and Racing UK/Racing World subscribers access to Setanta's networks on all platforms.

On 23 June 2009, following financial difficulties and collapse into administration in the United Kingdom, Setanta Sports shuttered all their television networks. Racing UK announced the following day that they would take over operations of the network on their own and would broadcast free-to-air for the summer. The network resumed its subscription package on August 16, and soon became encrypted on Virgin Media as well.

On 17 December 2018, Racing UK was rebranded as Racing TV on air in anticipation of the first live broadcast of racing from Ireland on 1 January 2019. At the same time, Racing TV began promoting its new Racing TV Extra service which provides viewers with dedicated feeds from each racecourse fixture via Streaming and OTT TV platforms(SD only for Virgin Media Ireland customers).

== Racecourse Media Group ==
Racecourse Media Group Ltd (RMG) is the umbrella organisation for the 34 Racecourses, which holds their interest in Racing TV, Racecourse Retail Business, Racing TVi and RDC. The racecourses (and shareholders) are: Aintree, Ayr, Beverley, Carlisle, Cartmel, Catterick Bridge, Cheltenham, Chelmsford, Epsom Downs, Exeter, Fakenham, Goodwood, Hamilton Park, Haydock Park, Huntingdon, Kelso, Kempton Park, Leicester, Ludlow, Market Rasen, Musselburgh, Newbury, Newmarket, Nottingham, Perth, Pontefract, Redcar, Salisbury, Sandown Park, Stratford, Taunton, Thirsk, Warwick, Wetherby, Wincanton and York.

== Contracted courses ==
The list of the racecourses that are contracted to Racing TV are:

- Aintree
- Ascot (British Champions Day only)
- Ayr
- Ballinrobe
- Bellewstown
- Beverley
- Carlisle
- Cartmel
- Catterick Bridge
- Chelmsford City
- Cheltenham
- Clonmel
- Cork
- Curragh
- Downpatrick
- Down Royal
- Dundalk
- Epsom Downs
- Exeter
- Fairyhouse
- Fakenham
- Galway
- Goodwood
- Gowran Park
- Hamilton Park
- Haydock Park
- Huntingdon
- Kelso
- Kempton Park
- Kilbeggan
- Killarney
- Laytown
- Leicester
- Leopardstown
- Limerick
- Listowel
- Ludlow
- Market Rasen
- Musselburgh
- Naas
- Navan
- Newmarket
- Newmarket (Rowley)
- Nottingham
- Pontefract
- Perth
- Punchestown
- Redcar
- Roscommon
- Salisbury
- Sandown Park
- Sligo
- Stratford-on-Avon
- Taunton
- Thirsk
- Thurles
- Tipperary
- Tramore
- Warwick
- Wetherby
- Wexford
- Wincanton
- York

== Programming ==
The channel starts broadcasting before live racing every day. In the mornings Racing Replay and/or Irish Racing Replay is shown until one of Mark Your Card, Full SP or Luck on Sunday are broadcast, live racing from the UK and Ireland typically follows in the afternoon and evening. The programmes have been produced in High-definition at Ealing Studios since 2012 and on location from the 61 racecourses. In late 2023 the production moved to Ealing Broadcast Centre Racing UK was the first dedicated horse racing channel to broadcast racing in HD when it launched its new service on 14 March 2016.

- Live Racing
- Racing Replay
- Irish Racing Replay
- Mark Your Card
- This Racing Life
- Luck On Sunday
- The Road to Cheltenham
- The Friday Club
- The Full SP
- My Racing Life

== Presenters ==
- Angus McNae – Studio presenter and on-course reporter
- Nick Lightfoot – Studio presenter and on-course reporter
- Nick Luck – Studio presenter and on-course reporter. Also worked for Channel 4 Racing
- Lydia Hislop – Studio presenter and on-course reporter. Also worked for BBC Sport
- Rishi Persad – Studio presenter and on-course reporter. Also works for BBC Sport and ITV Racing
- Ruby Walsh – Occasional studio work and on-course reporter. (former jockey). Also works for ITV Racing
- Tom Stanley – Studio presenter and on-course reporter.
- Gary O'Brien - On-course reporter.
- Kevin O'Ryan - On-course reporter.
- Fran Berry – On-course reporter (former jockey).
- Niall Hannity – Studio presenter and on-course reporter (former jockey).
- Rachel Casey – Studio presenter and on-course reporter.
- Gordon Brown – On-course reporter.
- Martin Dwyer – Occasional studio work and on-course reporter (jockey).
- George Baker (jockey) - Occasional studio work and on-course reporter (former jockey).
- Sam Turner - On-course reporter and tipster.
- Dave Nevison - On-course reporter and tipster.
- Chris Dixon - On-course reporter.
- Martin Dixon - On-course reporter.
- Mark Howard - On-course reporter.

== Racing World ==
Racing World

Ownership
- Owner: Racing World Limited (Racing UK, Magna Entertainment, Churchill Downs Incorporated) (2006-2008); Setanta Sports (2008-2009)
- Sister channels: Arsenal TV; Celtic TV; ESPN America; LFC TV; Racing UK; Rangers TV; Setanta Sports 1 Setanta Sports 2 Setanta Ireland; Setanta Sports News

History
- Launched: 8 March 2006
- Closed: 24 August 2009

Racing World was a television channel that operated as a joint-venture between Racing UK, Magna Entertainment Corp. and Churchill Downs Incorporated, and broadcast horse racing coverage from the United States, including such courses as Arlington Park and Churchill Downs. The channel broadcast for two years, from March 2006 to April 2008.

=== History ===
On 3 March 2006, Racing UK announced the launch of Racing World. The channel launched a few days later on 8 March 2006. The channel was broadcast on Sky Digital channel 433 from 5:30 pm–1:00 am, Wednesday-Monday, and was available to existing Racing UK subscribers at no extra cost.

In 2007, due to cost-cutting measures, live UK-led content was removed, and the channel began sourcing content from Magna Entertainment and Churchill Downs' US horse racing network HRTV.

On 29 April 2008, Racing UK and Setanta Sports announced that the channel would cease operations due to poor viewing figures, while Setanta would keep the EPG slot for future use. The channel ended its broadcast the following day, alongside the Racing World Limited joint-venture being dissolved after Magna and Churchill Downs pulled out. In May, Racing UK's executive chairman, Simon Bazalgette, stated that while Racing World had a range of followers, the interest was sufficient to justify a dedicated channel. Afterward, the slot was given out to Satanta Sports for future use. As a barter network, Racing World's broadcast capacity on Sky was reduced to 12:00 am–3:00 am (later 11:00 pm-2:00 am), timesharing with the Commercial/Pub version of Setanta Sports 1. Its status varied depending on the day, ranging from airing a test card for Setanta PPV2, simulcasting Racing UK, or showcasing football matches and other sports from Setanta's other channels.

On 23 June 2009, following financial difficulties and collapse into administration in the United Kingdom, Setanta Sports shuttered all their television networks. Despite the closure, Racing World remained broadcasting as a free-to-air service. On 11 July, Racing World's slot was used to air UFC 100 live, with other content related to UFC, including episodes of UFC's Top 100 Fights and the countdown to the event, airing prior. On 22 July, Setanta UK's administrator Deloitte announced that it would sell their Sky EPG slots through Canis Media, including Racing World's slot on channel 435. On 24 August, the channel was removed from the Sky EPG.
