= Lindsey Archibald =

Scottish journalist and presenter

Lindsey Archibald is a Scottish journalist and TV presenter. Archibald was a presenter for Daybreak, Setanta Sports, and Rangers TV.

Originally from Denny, Archibald spent four years in radio, including Radio Forth, where she was a football commentator. In the mid-2000s, Archibald presented the news on L107.

She worked at ITV Border from 2005 to 2007 as a broadcast journalist and occasional presenter on the regional news programme, Lookaround. Until 2012, she was part of Daybreak Scotland, which provided morning regional news bulletins for TV in Central and Northern Scotland.

Archibald worked as group digital director for the Herald Group, publishers of The Herald.
