= Safe as Houses =

Safe as Houses may refer to:

- Safe as Houses (TV programme), Scottish television property programme
- Safe as Houses (album), a 2006 album by Parenthetical Girls
