= List of La Liga broadcasters =

This is a list of television broadcasters which provide coverage of La Liga, Spanish football's top-level competition.

La Liga matches have been broadcast since 1963 when the public television station TVE reached an agreement with the RFEF to broadcast one match each week. The number of matches that TVE broadcast in a year varied according to the agreements between the clubs and TVE, with the Federation as a mediating body.

== The conflicts ==
The first came in 1971 when the Federation wanted to intervene in the contracts of some clubs with TVE and prohibited all television broadcasting. The situation was quickly resolved due to the need of both the teams and the public network to obtain benefits from broadcasts.

However, the big confrontation happened in 1979 when the main representatives of the clubs agreed with the president of the Federation not to broadcast live any match and thus encourage attendance at the fields. The great financial problems of the clubs, the lack of attendance at the playing fields and the refusal of TVE to increase the economic offer motivated this decision. The problem that arose was that some teams had contracts in force with TVE for one more season and the cancellation meant the loss of multiple advertising contracts. Finally, an agreement was not reached with TVE and the teams with current contracts unilaterally broke their commitments.

In the 1983-84 season, TVE changed its position regarding televised football. Public television was not willing to pay the same amount as the previous year. Despite the disagreements, TVE and the clubs finally reached an agreement for the broadcast of 18 live matches and the Sunday highlights. The rates for each game remained the same as the previous season.

=== The appearance of regional television stations ===
The tranquility was broken by an unforeseen event: the appearance of regional television stations that from the beginning opted for football broadcasts (whether live matches or highlights). With them appeared the first serious fights for the broadcasting rights.

For the 1984-85 season, negotiations were difficult as the clubs demanded more money in the face of competition from regional networks. TVE, for its part, wanted to reduce the number of televised matches and unilaterally negotiate the contract exclusively. With very conflicting positions, the competition began without an agreement on the broadcast. The regional television stations took a step forward and agreed with the LFP to highlights of the matches that were played on Sundays. TVE, for its part, subsequently signed a commitment to offer highlights of the entire matchday. The season ended without the broadcast of any live match.

The 1985-86 season brought back consensus between television and clubs for the live broadcast of matches. TVE agreed to broadcast eight to 12 matches for which it paid a variable amount depending on the category of the match, and the regional television stations, including the recently launched Televisión de Galicia, signed a contract to offer highlights of the day and between three and eight live matches. These should have as protagonists teams from the Autonomous Communities themselves whenever they were local.

In the following years, the regional networks gained greater prominence. In the 1986-87 season, renewed the agreement signed the previous year, while TVE confirmed the broadcast of a minimum of ten and a maximum of 12 live matches. The fight for broadcasting rights stabilized.

In the 1987-88 season, TVE and regional television reached an agreement to share the rights for the first time, for two years to broadcast 36 live games each season. Every week they alternated broadcasting the game ahead of Saturday.

== Arrival of pay TV and the football war ==
On May 3, 1988, the Private Television Law was approved, which gave authorization for the appearance of the first commercial TV networks and the breakup of the TVE monopoly that had lasted longer than thirty years.

With the arrival of private channels (Antena 3 in 1989 and Telecinco and Canal Plus from 1990), a new stage opened in the fight for the television rights of the La Liga.

For the 1990-91 season, the federation made the first tender for the rights, being granted Canal Plus. Demonstrating the importance that football had acquired for television, pay television reached an agreement with regional television stations (through the recently created FORTA) to share the television rights of La Liga. The contract had a duration of 8 years for which the television networks paid 54 billion pesetas (12 billion corresponded to Canal Plus). The regional television stations broadcast a match every Saturday, while the pay TV network did so on Sundays. TVE was left out of the agreement and only managed to broadcast the regional matches broadcasts for communities without their own broadcast and highlights on Sundays.

In September 1996, the federation changed the agreement for the sale of audiovisual rights that it had established with Forta and Canal+ until the 1997-98 season, to modify that contract and include Antena 3, allowing it to broadcast a match on Free-to-Air on Monday for the 1996–97 and 1997-98 seasons. This conflict had both media and political repercussions, and several complaints and accusations were made against different directors of the companies involved since Canal Plus was categorically opposed to any modification of the contract of July 6, 1990.

Because each club was the owner to market its audiovisual rights, Antena 3 and Canal Plus began to negotiate to be able to acquire the rights of the largest number of clubs with the 1998-99 season, a fight to which TV3 would also join, which would start the so-called The football war (La guerra del fútbol).

The private channel (through the company Gestora de Medios Audiovisuales) decided to offer yo clubs a contract of 27 billion pesetas for five seasons starting in 1998. Canal Plus (through the company Gestport) decided to make another offer of 31 billion pesetas for 7 seasons and the fight began to obtain the signatures of the teams. These networks were joined by Televisió de Catalunya (TV3), which had already obtained the rights to FC Barcelona that same year.

After several confrontations, companies reached an understanding and signed an agreement to establish Audiovisual Sport SL, in which 40% would be owned by Sogecable (Canal Plus), 40% by Antena 3 TV, and 20% by TV3. This company would exploit 100% of the television rights of Spanish football until the 2002/03 season. After the accession of the regional television stations, they could broadcast one first division match every Saturday. Canal Plus, for its part, would broadcast a first division match every Sunday in pay TV. This agreement would be called the Christmas Eve pact (El pacto de nochebuena), since it was signed on December 24, 1996.

Throughout 1997, two digital platforms were born (Canal Satélite Digital and Vía Digital) that will compete in the television market until 2003. After the creation of Audiovisual Sport, the new contract awarded the exploitation rights of the new modality of pay-per-view to Canal Satélite Digital. In the following years the fight between the two platforms would be very tough. Canal Satélite Digital broadcast the matches on PPV during the 1996/97 season but the following year had to share the rights with Vía Digital due to political pressures. In the 1998/99 season (the first of the new contract) and after the failure of the merger of the two platforms, Canal Satélite asserted its right established in the contract and exclusively issued the matches. Finally, in June 1999, the two companies reached an agreement by which they would share the PPV rights until the 2008/09 season.

On July 5, 1997, the government approved the so-called 'football law', which harmed Canal Plus and established the obligation to broadcast at least one free-to-air match of the day whenever there was an interested operator. The law is still in force and a match of little interest is broadcast every Friday.

=== Arrival of Mediapro and second football war ===
In 2006, another event occurred that would shake the market, the arrival of the television services company Mediapro, which was integrated in Audiovisual Sport company after having acquired the television exploitation rights of F.C. Barcelona for seven years, as well as those of other teams. After tense situations that included the prohibition of entry of cameras, on July 24, 2006 the parties ended up agreeing on a new version of the Christmas Eve Pact. The two companies could offer all paid matches and La Sexta would broadcast free-to-air.

Subsequent disagreements between the partners led to mutual accusations of non-compliance with this agreement, which would begin the second football war.

On July 9, 2007, Audiovisual Sport announced the filing of a lawsuit against Mediapro to demand compliance with its payment obligations and compensation. Mediapro announces that it has reached an agreement with 39 of the 42 clubs in the LFP and requests a renegotiation of the contract and announces its intention to market the rights itself. On October 9, 2007, a court approves precautionary measures requested by AVS and prohibits Mediapro from exploiting the audiovisual rights of first division clubs. On July 15, 2008. AVS claims 200 million debt from this production company. Finally, on June 4, 2009, Sogecable and Mediapro reached an agreement that guarantees Canal+ and Digital+ subscribers all matches, at least for the next three seasons.

== Centralized sale of rights ==
Finally, after several years of legal battles and selling the rights individually, on April 30, 2015, Royal Decree-Law 5/2015 was approved, which establishes a joint marketing system for the audiovisual rights of professional football from the 2016-17 season, which avoids wars between operators and economic inequalities. No team will be able to directly market these rights, which must be transferred to the competition organizer, the LFP, which will be the entity in charge of selling the rights through a tender.

This allowed the 20 clubs to go from earning nearly €800 million to pocketing more than €1.5 billion. The rights for this first cycle were granted to Telefonica with one First pick match exclusively, beIN Sports that acquired a package of 8 matches in third choice and Mediapro with the free-to-air match.

For the 2019-22 cycle, the league put eight lots up for sale. Telefónica managed to obtain the rights to lots 4 and 5, which included "one first pick match on each matchday of the First Division, exclusively, eight paid matches of each matchday, exclusively in the third selection", and the highlights of all matches. The total cost of the lots awarded was €3.42 billion, 15% more than in the last cycle.

For the current cycle, La Liga sold the rights to Movistar and DAZN for five seasons from 2022-23 to 2026-27. This agreement is valued at €4.95 billion and represents an increase of 1% more compared to the previous agreement that Movistar owned exclusively.

Movistar broadcasts five games per day and DAZN the remaining five in a new model for selling television rights. In addition, Movistar has the right to broadcast three full matchdays. GOL Televisión will continue to broadcast one match per day on FTA, with the limitation that it will never be one in which a club from European competitions participates.

=== International rights ===
For the 2015-16 season, Mediapro had the rights to 38 of the 42 first and second division teams. The company reached an agreement with the League to transfer the rights of all its teams to the LFP to advance to that season the centralized sale of the same, which was mandatory by royal decree starting with the 2016-2017 season. In exchange for this advance, the League made Mediapro the marketing agent of the international rights for a guaranteed minimum price of €400 million, an amount that would be much higher once the sale by country of the same is completed and which could amount to €600 million unlike the previous year where, without centralized sales, the teams obtained only €230 million. The agreement did not include, of course, neither Barcelona – nor the three teams that Telefónica had in its portfolio (Celta de Vigo, Real Sociedad and Espanyol).

Telefonica presented a counteroffer of up to €450 million per season (€1.35bn for three years). The proposal did not offer a guaranteed minimum – as Mediapro did – and that is why it was classified as insufficient. The proposal did not satisfy La Liga either with the amount, which was below what they would obtain with the intermediation of Mediapro, or with the formula: while the Catalan audiovisual group only acted as an intermediary in exchange for a commission, the multinational telecommunications company would take ownership and resell them to third parties without the obligation to consult.

This situation would cause a return to the past, in which La Liga had almost no decision-making power over which operator it transferred broadcasts abroad to. Until that moment, could negotiate directly and in some countries or markets decide not only based on the economic offer, but also according to the level of media exposure guaranteed by television.

In 2018, the company extended the agreement with the sale of international audiovisual rights for the next five seasons from 2019/2020 until 2023/2024. Thanks to this agreement, LaLiga is guaranteed income from international audiovisual rights of €4.48bn over the period, 30% more than in the previous three-year period.

In the latest agreement, Mediapro extended the rights until the 2028-2029 season. However, this time the Middle East, North Africa and North America have been excluded from the new pact, since LaLiga already has regional companies there to manage them.

== Broadcasters ==
=== Domestic broadcast ===
Seasons	Free-to-air		Pay television										PPV	Total
2009–2010	laSexta	38	Canal+	38	Canal+ Liga	106 (Note: All Canal+ Liga matches were shown live on GOLT.)	GOLT	128	–				191 (Note: One PPV match per matchweek was shown live on GOLT starting on MW22 (MW37 excluded).)	380
2010–2011	laSexta	38	Canal+	38	Canal+ Liga	112	GOLT	146	–				192 (Note: One PPV match per matchweek was shown live on GOLT (excluding MW11, MW 36–38).)	380
2011–2012	laSexta	38	Canal+	38	Canal+ Liga	114	GOLT	152	Canal+ Liga 2	190	Abono Fútbol	152	190 (Note: All PPV matches were shown on Canal+ Liga 2 and either GOLT or Abono Futbol.)	380
2012–2013	laSexta	5	Canal+	38	Canal+ Liga	304 (Note: Matches were shared by both channels.)	GOLT	304	–				–	380
2012–2013	MARCA TV	23	Canal+	38	Canal+ Liga	304	GOLT	304	–				–	380
2012–2013	Cuatro	10 (Note: Mediaset took the rights from Mediapro in April 2013.)	Canal+	38	Canal+ Liga	304	GOLT	304	–				–	380
2013–2014	Cuatro	38	Canal+	38	Canal+ Liga	304	GOLT	304	–				1 (Note: 2013/14 MW38 league deciding match Barcelona-Atletico Madrid was available on Digital+ PPV platform.)	380
2014–2015	Cuatro	27	Canal+	38	Canal+ Liga	304	GOLT	304	–				–	380
2014–2015	Energy	11	Canal+	38	Canal+ Liga	304	GOLT	304	–				–	380
2015–2016	La 1	32	Canal+ Partidazo	38	Canal+ Liga	304	Abono Fútbol	304	–				–	380
2015–2016	Teledeporte	6	Abono Fútbol 1	38	Canal+ Liga	304	Abono Fútbol	304	–				–	380
2016–2019	GOL	38	Movistar Partidazo	38	BeIN LaLiga	304	–						–	380
2019–2022	GOL	38	Movistar LaLiga	342	–								–	380
2022–2025	GOL	38	Movistar LaLiga	205 (Note: Five matches over 35 weeks will be split between Movistar and DAZN (with Movistar getting exclusive rights for three full matchweeks).)	DAZN	175	–						–	380
2025–2027	DAZN	38 (Note: Accessible via the DAZN app.)	Movistar LaLiga	205	DAZN	175	–						–	380

Notes
Matches shown per season

=== International broadcasters ===
==== Americas ====
Country	Broadcasters
Argentina; Bolivia; Chile; Colombia; Ecuador; Peru; Uruguay; Venezuela	ESPN; DSports
Central America	Sky Sports; Vix+ en Tigo
Brazil	CazéTV; SportyNet
Canada	TSN/RDS
Caribbean	Rush Sports
Cuba	Tele Rebelde
Dominican Republic	Sky Sports
Haiti	Canal+
Mexico	Sky Sports; Canal 5
Paraguay	ESPN
Puerto Rico	ESPN
Suriname	Rush Sports; ABC; ATV; QN Sport; SCCN; STVS
United States	ESPN

==== Asia and Oceania ====
Country	Broadcasters
Afghanistan	AF Sports; Meraj Sports
Australia	beIN Sports
Bangladesh	T Sports; Tapmad
Brunei	beIN Sports
Cambodia	beIN Sports
Central Asia	Setanta Sports
China	Migu; CCTV
Hong Kong	Now Sports
India	FanCode
Indonesia	beIN Sports
Iran	IRIB Varzesh; Gem Sport; Persiana Sports
Japan	DAZN; U-Next
Laos	beIN Sports
Macau	TDM; Macau Cable TV; M Plus
Malaysia	beIN Sports
Maldives	ICE Network
Nepal	DGO
New Zealand	beIN Sports
Pacific Islands	Digicel
Pakistan	Begin
Papua New Guinea	Digicel
Philippines	beIN Sports; Setanta Sports
Singapore	beIN Sports
South Korea	Coupang Play
Sri Lanka	Begin
Taiwan	DAZN
Tajikistan	Varzish TV
Thailand	beIN Sports; PPTV
Uzbekistan	Zo'r TV
Vietnam	SCTV; On Sports

==== Europe ====
Country	Broadcasters
Albania	SuperSport
Armenia	Fast Sports
Austria	DAZN
Azerbaijan	Setanta Sports; Idman TV; SportTV
Belarus	Kinopoisk; Belarus 5
Belgium	DAZN
Bosnia and Herzegovina	Arena Sport
Bulgaria	Max Sport
Croatia	Sport Klub
Cyprus	Cytavision Sports
Czech Republic	Nova Sport
Denmark	Disney+
Estonia	Setanta Sports; Go3 Sport
Finland	Disney+
France	Disney+ DAZN
Georgia	Silk Sport; Setanta Sports
Germany	DAZN
Greece	Magenta Sport
Hungary	Spíler TV
Iceland	Disney+
Ireland	Premier Sports; Disney+
Italy	DAZN; Mediaset
Kosovo	Sport
Latvia	Setanta Sports; Go3 Sport
Liechtenstein	DAZN
Lithuania	Setanta Sports; Go3 Sport
Luxembourg	DAZN
Malta	Total Sports Network
Moldova	Setanta Sports
Montenegro	Arena Sport
Netherlands	Ziggo Sport
North Macedonia	Arena Sport
Norway	TV 2 Sport; Viaplay
Poland	Canal+
Portugal	DAZN
Romania	Digi Sport; Prima Sport
Russia	Match TV
San Marino	DAZN
Serbia	Arena Sport
Slovakia	Nova Sport
Slovenia	Sport Klub
Sweden	Disney+
Switzerland	DAZN
Turkey	S Sport
Ukraine	MEGOGO
United Kingdom	Premier Sports; Disney+

==== Middle East and North Africa ====
Country	Broadcasters
MENA	beIN Sports
Iraq	1001
Palestine	ONE

==== Sub-Saharan Africa ====
Country	Broadcasters
Angola	ZAP
Cameroon	CRTV Sports
Ghana	Sporty TV
Kenya	Sporty TV
Nigeria	Sporty TV
South Africa	Sporty TV
Kenya	Azam Sports
Malawi	Azam Sports
Rwanda	Azam Sports
Tanzania	Azam Sports
Uganda	Azam Sports
Zambia	Azam Sports
Zimbabwe	Azam Sports
Mauritius	MBC
Mozambique	ZAP; TV Miramar
Sub-Saharan Africa	SuperSport; Canal+ Afrique; StarTimes; New World TV; DAZN
