= Ashley House (TV presenter) =

- Born: Harrow, Middlesex, UK
- Occupation: Television presenter

Ashley House is a former school teacher of Economics, Business Studies & Italian at Cheltenham College, who quit his job to pursue a career in sports journalism & broadcasting. Since then he has pursued his broadcasting career on many levels, presenting shows on the BBC, Sky Sports, ITN, Channel 5, Televisión Española, and others.

House is the moderator host of Accenture PLC's 'Sustainability 24', a 12-hour live worldwide debate bringing together sustainable business leaders from around the world to discuss innovation, transformation and scaling-up in sustainability.

He is currently the anchor for Eurosport International's cycling coverage, the Olympic Games and the FIFA World Cup, and other programming

== Broadcasting career ==
Ashley House was a contestant on the first season of Fame Academy in 2002. He was the first contestant to be eliminated from the competition.

He was the launch presenter on new channel Setanta Sports News in November 2007, having been sports correspondent for Five news. House presented rugby on Sky Sports, tennis on Eurosport and football on Five. He also presented on Real Madrid TV for two years.

In January 2008 he presented the launch of Arsenal TV. House has also previously worked for Sit-Up TV on their channels.

In October 2009 House began presenting the sports news on BBC News, BBC World & BBC Breakfast.

Then in July 2010 House was fronting the TV advertising campaign for Warranty Direct. He was also the face of campaigns for Loctite Super Glue, D&G perfumes

House has also featured in one episode of the BBC children's spy drama 'MI: High'.

House was the presenter of 'Together to London', a television show with interviews and features about London, sports, and English culture during the 2012 Olympics.

House presented pre- and post-game/race chat and analysis shows for Eurosport during the Football World Cup 2014 in Brazil, the 2015 Giro d'Italia, Tour de France 2015 and the 2015 Vuelta a Espana.

== Personal life ==
He was married to the British actress Lynsey Pow (born 1979) until her death in 2013. This was his second marriage.
