= List of La Liga stadiums =

Since the inception of La Liga in 1929, Spain's highest level of association football annual league tournament, 88 football stadiums have been used to host matches. The inaugural round of La Liga matches took place on 10 February 1929 with five clubs hosting the opening fixtures.

Johan Cruyff Stadium was the latest stadium to host its first La Liga match and the arena that was built most recently.

== Stadiums ==
Stadiums listed in bold indicate that they are the home grounds of teams participating in the 2025–26 La Liga season, while those stadiums listed in italics have now been demolished.

Stadium	Image	Club	Location	Opened	Closed	Current capacity †	Refs
Alfredo Di Stéfano		Real Madrid	(Community of Madrid) Madrid	2006		6,000	
Altabix		Elche	(Valencian Community) Elche	1926	1976	15,000	
**Reale Arena**; Formerly Anoeta		Real Sociedad	(Basque Country (autonomous community)) San Sebastián	1993		39,500	
Atotxa		Real Sociedad	(Basque Country (autonomous community)) San Sebastián	1913	1999	26,700	
Avenida de Cataluña		Gimnàstic	(Catalonia) Tarragona	1922	1972	10,000	
**Balaídos**		Celta Vigo	(Galicia (Spain)) Vigo	1928		29,000‡	
Bardín		Hércules	(Valencian Community) Alicante	1932	1954	8,000	
**Benito Villamarín**; Formerly Patronato Obrero; Formerly Heliópolis; Formerly Manuel Ruiz de Lopera		Real Betis	(Andalusia) Seville	1929		60,720	
**Butarque**		Leganés	(Community of Madrid) Leganés	1998		11,454	
Camilo Cano		Levante	(Valencian Community) La Nucia	2019		4,000	
Camp d'Esports		Lleida	(Catalonia) Lleida	1918		13,500	
Camp del Guinardó		Europa	(Catalonia) Barcelona	1923	1964	19,000	
Camp Nou		Barcelona	(Catalonia) Barcelona	1957		99,354‡	
Carlos Belmonte		Albacete	(Castilla–La Mancha) Albacete	1960		17,102	
Carlos Tartiere (1932)		Oviedo	(Asturias) Oviedo	1932	2003	16,000	
**Carlos Tartiere (2003)**		Oviedo	(Asturias) Oviedo	2003		30,500	
Castalia (1945)		Castellón	(Valencian Community) Castellón de la Plana	1945	1987	10,000	
Castalia (1987)		Castellón	(Valencian Community) Castellón de la Plana	1987		14,485	
Chamartín		Real Madrid	(Community of Madrid) Madrid	1924	1947	22,500	
Chapín		Xerez	(Andalusia) Jerez de la Frontera	1988		20,523	
**Ciutat de València**		Levante	(Valencian Community) Valencia	1969		26,354	
**Coliseum Alfonso Pérez**		Getafe	(Community of Madrid) Getafe	1998		17,000	
Colombino		Recreativo	(Andalusia) Huelva	1957	2007	13,000	
Creu Alta		Sabadell	(Catalonia) Sabadell	1906	1968	15,000	
El Alcoraz		Huesca	(Aragon) Huesca	1972		7,638	
El Arcángel		Córdoba	(Andalusia) Córdoba	1954	1993	15,500	
El Arcángel (1993)		Córdoba	(Andalusia) Córdoba	1993		21,822	
El Collao		Alcoyano	(Valencian Community) Alcoy	1929		4,850	
El Molinón		Sporting Gijón	(Asturias) Gijón	1908		29,029	
El Plantío		Burgos; Real Burgos	(Castile and León) Burgos	1964		12,200	
**El Sadar**; Formerly Reyno de Navarra		Osasuna	(Navarre) Pamplona	1967		18,761	
El Sardinero (1913)		Racing Santander	(Cantabria) Santander	1913	1988	20,000	
El Sardinero (1988)		Racing Santander	(Cantabria) Santander	1988		22,222	
El Sequiol		Castellón	(Valencian Community) Castellón de la Plana	1923	1947	8,000	
**Estadio de la Cerámica**; Formerly El Madrigal		Villarreal	(Valencian Community) Villarreal	1923		24,890	
Francisco de la Hera		Extremadura	(Extremadura) Almendralejo	1951		11,580	
Gran Canaria		Las Palmas	(Canary Islands) Las Palmas	2003		33,111	
Helmántico		Salamanca	(Castile and León) Villares de la Reina	1970		17,341	
Heliodoro Rodríguez López		Tenerife	(Canary Islands) Santa Cruz de Tenerife	1925		22,824	
Gobela; Formerly Ibaiondo		Arenas	(Basque Country (autonomous community)) Getxo	1925	2014	1,221	
Insular		Las Palmas	(Canary Islands) Las Palmas	1949	2014	21,000	
Ipurua		Eibar	(Basque Country (autonomous community)) Eibar	1947		8,164	
**Johan Cruyff**		Barcelona	(Catalonia) Sant Joan Despí	2019		6,000	
José Rico Pérez		Hércules	(Valencian Community) Alicante	1974		29,500	
José Zorrilla (1940)		Valladolid	(Castile and León) Valladolid	1940	1987	18,000	
José Zorrilla (1982)		Valladolid	(Castile and León) Valladolid	1982		26,512	
Juan Rojas		AD Almería	(Andalusia) Almería	1976		13,468	
**La Cartuja**		Real Betis	(Andalusia) Seville	1999		70,000	
La Condomina		Murcia	(Region of Murcia) Murcia	1924		6,500	
La Puentecilla		Cultural Leonsa	(Castile and León) León	1955	1998	12,844	
La Romareda		Zaragoza	(Aragon) Zaragoza	1957		34,596	
La Rosaleda		CD Málaga; Málaga CF	(Andalusia) Málaga	1941		30,044	
La Victoria		Jaén	(Andalusia) Jaén	1944	2005	11,500	
La Viña		Hércules	(Valencian Community) Alicante	1954	1974	12,000	
Las Gaunas		Logroñés	(La Rioja) Logroño	1923	2002	14,895	
Les Corts		Barcelona; Condal	(Catalonia) Barcelona	1922	1966	60,000	
**Lluís Companys**; Formerly Montjuïc		Barcelona; Espanyol	(Catalonia) Barcelona	1929		54,000	
Lluís Sitjar		Mallorca	(Balearic Islands) Palma	1945	2014	18,000	
Los Cármenes		Granada	(Andalusia) Granada	1934	1995	22,000	
Los Pajaritos		Numancia	(Castile and León) Soria	1999		8,727	
**Manuel Martínez Valero**; Formerly Nuevo Estadio		Elche	(Valencian Community) Elche	1976		33,732	
**Mendizorrotza**		Alavés	(Basque Country (autonomous community)) Vitoria-Gasteiz	1924		19,840	
**Mestalla**; Formerly Luis Casanova		Valencia	(Valencian Community) Valencia	1923		49,500	
Metropolitano		Atlético Madrid	(Community of Madrid) Madrid	1923	1966	35,800	
**Montilivi**		Girona	(Catalonia) Girona	1970		13,450	
Nervión		Sevilla	(Andalusia) Seville	1928	1958	20,000	
Nou Estadi		Gimnàstic	(Catalonia) Tarragona	1972		14,591	
Nova Creu Alta		Sabadell	(Catalonia) Sabadell	1967		11,981	
Nueva Condomina		Murcia	(Region of Murcia) Murcia	2006		31,179	
Nuevo Colombino		Recreativo	(Andalusia) Huelva	2001		21,670	
Nuevo Los Cármenes		Granada	(Andalusia) Granada	1995		22,094	
Nuevo Mirandilla; Formerly Ramón de Carranza		Cádiz	(Andalusia) Cádiz	1955		25,033	
Pasarón		Pontevedra	(Galicia (Spain)) Pontevedra	1965		12,000	
Power Horse; Formerly Estadio de los Juegos Mediterráneos		Almería	(Andalusia) Almería	2004		15,200	
**Ramón Sánchez Pizjuán**		Sevilla	(Andalusia) Seville	1958		42,714	
**RCDE Stadium**; Formerly Power8 Stadium		Espanyol	(Catalonia) Cornellà–El Prat	2009		40,500	
Riazor		Deportivo La Coruña	(Galicia (Spain)) A Coruña	1944		34,600	
**Riyadh Air Metropolitano**; Formerly Wanda Metropolitano; Formerly Cívitas Metropolitano		Atlético Madrid	(Community of Madrid) Madrid	2017		67,703	
Romano; Formerly Romano José Fouto		Mérida	(Extremadura) Mérida	1953		14,600	
San Juan		Osasuna	(Navarre) Pamplona	1922	1982	20,000	
San Lázaro		Compostela	(Galicia (Spain)) Santiago de Compostela	1993		12,000	
San Mamés (1913)		Athletic Bilbao	(Basque Country (autonomous community)) Bilbao	1913	2013	40,000	
**San Mamés (2013)**		Athletic Bilbao	(Basque Country (autonomous community)) Bilbao	2013		53,289	
Saniat Rmel; Formerly Varela		Atlético Tetuán	(Morocco) Tétouan	1913		15,000	
**Santiago Bernabéu**		Real Madrid	(Community of Madrid) Madrid	1947		81,044	
Sarrià		Espanyol	(Catalonia) Barcelona	1923	1997	44,000	
**Son Moix**; Formerly Iberostar Stadium; Formerly ONO Estadi		Mallorca	(Balearic Islands) Palma	1999		23,142	
Stadium Gal		Real Unión	(Basque Country (autonomous community)) Irun	1926		6,344	
Torrero		Zaragoza	(Aragon) Zaragoza	1923	1970	8,000	
**Vallecas**; Formerly Teresa Rivero		Rayo Vallecano	(Community of Madrid) Madrid	1976		14,708	
Vallejo		Levante	(Valencian Community) Valencia	1925	1968	18,000	
Vicente Calderón		Atlético Madrid	(Community of Madrid) Madrid	1966	2017	54,907	

† For closed or demolished grounds, capacity is taken at closure.
‡ Currently in the process of, or scheduled to be developed.

== See also ==
- List of football stadiums in Spain
- Lists of stadiums
