= Setanta Sports Eurasia =

- Logo since 2023
- Country: Georgia
- Broadcast area: Azerbaijan, Estonia, Georgia, Kazakhstan, Kyrgyzstan, Latvia, Lithuania, Moldova, Philippines, Tajikistan, Turkmenistan, Uzbekistan and Ukraine

Programming
- Languages: English; Georgian; Kazakh; Kyrgyz; Latvian; Ukrainian
- Picture format: 576i (SDTV); 1080i (HDTV)

Ownership
- Owner: Eurasian Broadcasting Enterprise Ltd (2012–2021); Adjarasport (2021–present)

History
- Launched: 2012; 14 years ago 26 September 2016; 10 years ago (Georgia); 1 August 2019; 7 years ago (Ukraine)

Links
- Website: www.setantasports.com

Setanta Sports Eurasia is a sports television network operating in the Baltic States, Eastern Europe and Central Asia operated and owned by Adjarasport trading as Setanta Sports.

== Availability ==
Setanta Sports Eurasia is currently available in Armenia, Azerbaijan, Estonia, Georgia, Kazakhstan, Kyrgyzstan, Latvia, Lithuania, Moldova, Philippines, Tajikistan, Turkmenistan, Ukraine and Uzbekistan.

== History ==
The channel launched in 2012 and is available in English, Georgian, Latvian, Ukrainian and Russian. From 2012 to 2021, it was owned by Eurasian Broadcasting Enterprise Ltd (EBEL). In February 2021, it was acquired by Georgian sports TV company Adjarasport who advised they would continue with the Setanta brand.

On August 28, 2021, the streaming service of Setanta Sports was launched.

On April 12, 2023, the distribution of Setanta Sports channels in Belarus was banned by the country's Ministry of Information.

== Channels ==
- Setanta Sports 1 (launched in 2012 as Setanta Sports)
- Setanta Sports 2 (launched in 2014 as Setanta Sports+)
- Setanta Sports 1 Georgia (launched in 2016)
- Setanta Sports 2 Georgia (launched in 2016)
- Setanta Sports 3 Georgia (launched on 9 September 2022)
- Setanta Sports KZ (launched on 24 September 2016 as Setanta Qazaqstan)
- Setanta Sports Ukraine (launched on 1 August 2019)
- Setanta Sports+ Ukraine (launched in February 2020)
- Setanta Sports Premium Ukraine (launched on 1 January 2025)
- Setanta Sports 1 Baltic (launched in 2022)
- Setanta Sports 2 Baltic (launched on 1 September 2023)
- Setanta Sports KG (launched in 2022 as Setanta Kyrgyzstan)
- Setanta Sports KZ+ (launched on 16 October 2023)

== Broadcasting rights ==
Sports	Country/Region	Competition/Tournament	ARM	AZE	BLT	GEO	KAZ	KGZ	MDA	TJK	TKM	UZB	UKR
Association football
Association football	South America	Copa América	—N/a	—N/a	—N/a	—N/a	Live and on-demand	—N/a	—N/a	—N/a	—N/a	—N/a	—N/a
Association football	England	Premier League	Live and on-demand	Live and on-demand	—N/a	Live and on-demand	Live and on-demand	Live and on-demand	Live and on-demand	Live and on-demand	Live and on-demand	Live and on-demand	Live and on-demand
Association football	England	English Football League	Live and on-demand	Live and on-demand	—N/a	Live and on-demand	Live and on-demand	Live and on-demand	Live and on-demand	Live and on-demand	Live and on-demand	Live and on-demand	Live and on-demand
Association football	England	EFL Cup	Live and on-demand	Live and on-demand	—N/a	Live and on-demand	Live and on-demand	Live and on-demand	Live and on-demand	Live and on-demand	Live and on-demand	Live and on-demand	Live and on-demand
Association football	Scotland	Scottish Professional Football League	Live and on-demand	Live and on-demand	Live and on-demand	Live and on-demand	Live and on-demand	Live and on-demand	Live and on-demand	Live and on-demand	Live and on-demand	Live and on-demand	Live and on-demand
Association football	Spain	La Liga	Live and on-demand	Live and on-demand	Live and on-demand	Live and on-demand (Note: Only on Setanta Sports)	Live and on-demand	Live and on-demand	Live and on-demand	Live and on-demand	Live and on-demand	Live and on-demand	—N/a
Association football	Italy	Serie A	Live and on-demand	Live and on-demand	Live and on-demand	Live and on-demand	Live and on-demand	Live and on-demand	Live and on-demand	Live and on-demand	Live and on-demand	Live and on-demand	—N/a
Association football	Germany	Bundesliga	Live and on-demand	Live and on-demand	—N/a	Live and on-demand	Live and on-demand	Live and on-demand	Live and on-demand	Live and on-demand	Live and on-demand	Live and on-demand	Live and on-demand
Association football	Belgium	Belgian Pro League	Live and on-demand	Live and on-demand	Live and on-demand	Live and on-demand	Live and on-demand	Live and on-demand	Live and on-demand	Live and on-demand	Live and on-demand	Live and on-demand	Live and on-demand
Association football	France	Ligue 1	Live and on-demand	Live and on-demand	Live and on-demand	Live and on-demand	Live and on-demand	Live and on-demand	Live and on-demand	Live and on-demand	Live and on-demand	Live and on-demand	—N/a
Rugby union	France	Top 14	Live and on-demand	Live and on-demand	Live and on-demand	Live and on-demand	Live and on-demand	Live and on-demand	Live and on-demand	Live and on-demand	Live and on-demand	Live and on-demand	—N/a
Basketball	United States	NBA	Live and on-demand	Live and on-demand	—N/a	Live and on-demand	Live and on-demand	Live and on-demand	Live and on-demand	Live and on-demand	Live and on-demand	Live and on-demand	Live and on-demand
Ice hockey	United States	NHL	Live and on-demand	Live and on-demand	—N/a	Live and on-demand	Live and on-demand	Live and on-demand	Live and on-demand	Live and on-demand	Live and on-demand	Live and on-demand	Live and on-demand
Golf	United States	The Masters	Live and on-demand	Live and on-demand	Live and on-demand	Live and on-demand	Live and on-demand	Live and on-demand	Live and on-demand	Live and on-demand	Live and on-demand	Live and on-demand	Live and on-demand
Golf	Europe	PGA European Tour	Live and on-demand	Live and on-demand	Live and on-demand	Live and on-demand	Live and on-demand	Live and on-demand	Live and on-demand	Live and on-demand	Live and on-demand	Live and on-demand	Live and on-demand
Combat sports	United States	UFC	Live and on-demand	Live and on-demand	—N/a	Live and on-demand	Live and on-demand	Live and on-demand	Live and on-demand	Live and on-demand	Live and on-demand	Live and on-demand	Live and on-demand
Combat sports	United Kingdom	Cage Warriors	Live and on-demand	Live and on-demand	Live and on-demand	Live and on-demand	Live and on-demand	Live and on-demand	Live and on-demand	Live and on-demand	Live and on-demand	Live and on-demand	Live and on-demand
Motorsport	Worldwide	Formula One	Live and on-demand	Live and on-demand	—N/a	Live and on-demand	Live and on-demand	Live and on-demand	Live and on-demand	Live and on-demand	Live and on-demand	Live and on-demand	Live and on-demand
Tennis	Worldwide	ATP Masters 1000	Live and on-demand	Live and on-demand	—N/a	Live and on-demand	Live and on-demand	Live and on-demand	Live and on-demand	Live and on-demand	Live and on-demand	Live and on-demand	Live and on-demand
