= SCCN =

- Paramaribo; Suriname
- Broadcast area: Paramaribo

Programming
- Languages: Dutch, Sranan Tongo
- Format: Full service

Ownership
- Owner: Rudisa

History
- First air date: 1999 (radio); 2000 (television)

Links
- Website: https://www.sccn.tv/

Suriname Cable and Communication Network N.V., better known as SCCN, is a Surinamese media company, headquartered in Paramaribo and owner of radio stations Radio B104.1 and Smooth FM and television station SCCN Channel 17. The company is part of the Rudisa conglomerate.

SCCN began in 1999 with its first radio broadcasts, followed in 2000 by television. It provides information, sport, music and entertainment, largely toward a young audience. The radio station has its own charts. It obtained the 2015-2018 rights for FIFA tournaments, including the 2018 FIFA World Cup; and had separate negotiations for UEFA Euro 2016. In October 2016, it had exclusive rights to La Liga; if another channel would ask for rights, SCCN was able to sublicense them.

It had an agreement with QN Sport + Television (Quaraisy Nagessersing), which ended on December 1, 2017, when its program on SCCN ended. QN moved to TV West (channel 7.2).
