= Setanta Sports =

Sports broadcasting brand

Setanta Sports Media
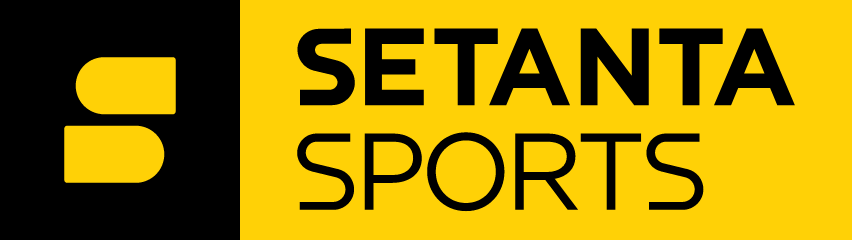
- Type: Limited company
- Industry: Sports broadcasting
- Founded: 1990; 36 years ago, in Dublin, Ireland
- Founder: Michael O'Rourke
- Defunct: 23 June 2009 (UK only); 29 January 2020 (except post-Soviet states)
- Headquarters: M. Kostava 14, Tbilisi, Georgia
- Area served: Current: Eastern Europe (except Belarus and Russia); Philippines; Formerly: United Kingdom; Ireland; Northern Ireland; Asia; Africa
- Owner: Eurasian Broadcasting Enterprise Ltd. Adjarasport (Eastern Europe only); Setanta Sports Philippines Ltd. (Philippines only)
- Website: setantasports.com

Setanta Sports Media is a sports television company founded in Dublin, Ireland and now based in Tbilisi, Georgia. Formed in 1990 to facilitate the broadcasting of Irish sporting events internationally, it operates channels in some countries of former USSR and the Philippines. It formerly operated channels in Ireland, the UK, Asia, Africa, Australia, the United States and Canada.

== Operations ==
=== Current ===
==== Eurasia ====
Setanta Sports sold the majority of its operations, but it continues to own and operate its operations in available in Armenia, Azerbaijan, Estonia, Georgia, Kazakhstan, Kyrgyzstan, Latvia, Lithuania, Moldova, Tajikistan, Turkmenistan, Ukraine and Uzbekistan.

==== Philippines ====
A joint partnership between Setanta founders and Adjara Group bought the exclusive broadcasting rights of the English Premier League for the Philippines, launching linear television and OTT variants of Setanta Sports there on 3 November 2022.

This variant also has local broadcast rights to La Liga, the NBA (selected matches only) and NBL Australia.

=== Former ===
Final logo used in the UK from 2007 to 2009.

==== Republic of Ireland ====
In December 2015, Eir purchased Setanta Sports Ireland Ltd. On 5 July 2016 Setanta Sports was rebranded Eir Sport.

==== Africa ====
Setanta operated Setanta Sports Africa and Setanta Action until October 2013 when they were acquired by 21st Century Fox, who announced through their division, Fox International Channels (later the Fox Networks Group), that from August 2014, they would be rebranded and relaunched respectively as Fox Sports 1 and Fox Sports 2 in time for the 2014–15 football league season Following the acquisition of 21st Century Fox by Disney on 20 March 2019, the channels were rebranded a final time to both ESPN and ESPN 2 on 30 August that year, thus marking the return of the ESPN brand to Africa for the first time since 2012.

==== Australia ====
On 14 August 2014, Setanta Sports Australia and Setanta Sports Plus were sold to the Al Jazeera Media Network with approval sought from regulators in Australia. The channel became BeIN Sports Australia that November.

==== Canada ====
Setanta Sports previously operated and owned 20% of a variant of the channel in Canada as a joint venture with Canadian media company Rogers Communications. However, its minority stake was acquired by Rogers in July 2011 and the channel was re-aligned as part of its Sportsnet networks, and become Sportsnet World on 3 October 2011. The relaunch took place as part of an overall rebranding of the Sportsnet networks.

==== United Kingdom ====
===== History =====
Setanta Sport originally launched on 5 July 2002 as a PPV service on Sky Digital. On 3 September, a second service – Setanta Sport 2, launched on Sky as well.

In April 2003, Setanta won a contract to operate a Sports channel on Freeview.

In January 2004, Setanta signed a deal with WWE to broadcast four of their Pay-Per-View events within the year beginning with Royal Rumble. In July, Setanta launched SPL Live on Sky and shortly afterward launched Celtic TV and Rangers TV on Sky and NTL in partnership with Celtic F.C. and Rangers F.C. respectively. Earlier on in the month, the company entered into a partnership with the newly launched Racing UK to become the channel's exclusive broadcast partner and distributor prior to its launch and encryption in September.

By 2005, Setanta Sport was renamed slightly to Setanta Sports. On 16 May 2005, Setanta PPV1 and PPV2 moved from 435 and 436 to 438 and 439 on Sky, respectively. On 30 July, Setanta launched a channel on the Top Up TV service on DTT. In August 2005, Setanta Sports 2, Celtic TV and Rangers TV were added to Telewest.

On 29 June 2006, Setanta purchased the broadcast rights to the PGA Tour from Sky and announced that they would launch a dedicated Golf network entitled Setanta Golf in January 2007. On 17 August, Setanta expanded their partnership with Racing UK, merging it's subscription package together with theirs to form one, allowing Setanta customers access to the channel and spinoff Racing World, and Racing UK/Racing World subscribers access to Setanta's networks on all platforms.

On 11 July 2007, the company signed a deal with Liverpool FC to launch LFC TV. On 20 July, they signed a deal with Virgin Media to make their networks free to anyone subscribed to the provider's TV XL service but would remain as premium add-ons for M or L package subscribers. The following week, the two companies announced plans to launch Setanta Sports News, which would rival Sky Sports News. The channel would launch in November. On 22 September, Setanta entered into a six-figure deal with Arsenal F.C. to launch Arsenal TV in December. The channel was however delayed, and instead launched in January 2008.

In March and May 2008, Setanta launched Arsenal Replay and AH.TV on Sky, timeshift services of Arsenal TV which operated late-at-night and were used as filler networks in case Setanta needed the slots. In May, the company purchased the Sky EPG slot formerly belonging to Racing World after Racing UK axed the channel due to poor viewing figures. Setanta reduced the channel's broadcast hours and began timesharing it with the Pub/Commercial version of Setanta Sports 1, although it remained under the Racing World name. As with Arsenal Replay and AH.TV, the Setanta version of Racing World was used as a filler network.

===== Financial difficulties and closure =====
Reports on 7 June 2009 suggested that Setanta could be forced into administration that week, after failing to make payments due on TV rights. Because of late payment and renegotiation over fees by Setanta to football clubs, several British football clubs were put into financial difficulties as money promised had been spent in annual budgets. On 4 June 2009, the Scottish Premier League announced they would be paying the sums that some of the clubs were owed to avoid causing them financial problems.

On 19 June 2009, Setanta Sports failed to pay the latest instalment of £30 million (€35 million) it owed the English Premier League. The Premier League had to sell the rights to the 46 live matches Setanta had for the 2009/10 season. A Premier League spokesman said, "It is with considerable regret that we announce that Setanta has been unable to meet their obligations. As such the existing licence agreement between us has been terminated with immediate effect."

On 21 June 2009, BT Vision stopped selling Setanta Sports channels to customers.

On 22 June 2009, it was reported by RTÉ News that the original Setanta Sports channel, Setanta Ireland, might be bought out by an existing consortium who already hold interests in Setanta Sport Holdings Ltd., the Irish arm of Setanta Sports. Setanta Sports Ireland and Setanta Sports North America were the only brands which made a profit in 2008. The same day, Setanta lost all their SPL TV rights because they were unable to pay the £3m (€3.5m) owed to the league. Following this, it was announced that ESPN UK had bought the rights to show the 46 Premier League games bought by Setanta for the 2009/10 season.

Setanta GB went into administration 23 June 2009, following failure to make payments to a number of sporting organisations. 430 jobs, 200 of which were in Ireland, were expected to be lost as a result of its going into administration. The administration was handled by Deloitte. At 18:00 that day, most of its channels ceased operations within Great Britain.

According to the final report published by Setanta's administrator Deloitte, released in July 2010, the broadcaster had outstanding bank loans of £261m STG and unsecured debt of £288m STG. Deloitte said that unsecured lenders received just 2p for every pound that they have claimed back from the defunct operator.

Arsenal TV continued until August 2009 while Arsenal explored alternative options. Liverpool FC assumed responsibility for LFC TV and decided to continue broadcasting as normal.

===== Criticism =====
Just as when Sky Sports, in the 1990s, first obtained the exclusive rights to screen live coverage of the England national football team's away qualifying matches for the World Cup, so Setanta attracted similar criticism as a result of it having obtained the same contract. Whereas Sky often sold on a highlights package to a terrestrial broadcaster (BBC), Setanta indicated that the sums offered by terrestrial broadcasters, reported to be £100,000 to £200,000, were five to ten times lower than their perceived market value; Setanta paid £5 million to screen England's away qualifier with Croatia on 10 September 2008 and believed a sensible highlights package should attract a fee of £1 million. Thus, no highlights package was agreed, and Setanta themselves showed highlights of both England and Scotland qualifiers free-to-air after the live games had concluded. This was announced at 18:00 on the day the matches took place, and received 220,000 viewers. Setanta then accepted "a low, six-figure deal" with ITV to show delayed "extended highlights" a few days later.

Setanta's GB subscriber numbers were lower than those of Sky Sports, and the number of households watching the match live was estimated at 1.5 million. Because of the availability of Setanta on both digital satellite and digital terrestrial television, the theoretical possible subscriber base surpassed that of Sky Sports (not available via DTT at the time) but fans who were unwilling to subscribe could not see the match live. British Prime Minister at the time Gordon Brown indicated he felt it "unfortunate" more fans could not see the match live for free.

===== Cancellation issues =====
Setanta GB also received significant criticism of its cancellation policy, with the issue investigated by the BBC's Watchdog programme and Radio 5 Live. While customers were able to subscribe either on-line or over the telephone, many customers found it "nigh-on impossible to cancel" the service, with the only means of a cancellation being to inform the company in writing.

Because of the amount of negative feedback received, Setanta GB eventually changed this to allow for cancellations to be done through email. Furthermore, while customers were originally entered into a 30-day notice period once their cancellation letter was received, this was increased to 60 days without any information being sent to customers; again, because of the negative feedback, this was quickly reduced back to 30 days. These customer service issues were compounded by the fact that customers had to phone a premium rate number should they have any issues to resolve, with calls costing at least 10 pence per minute.

==== Southeast Asia ====
Setanta Sports launched a variation of the channel in Asia. In 2015, Discovery International purchased the channel, as of 2016 the channel is still branded as Setanta Sports under licence from Setanta Ireland. Setanta Asia currently operates Setanta Sports Plus and Setanta Sports Asia. From 29 January 2020, Setanta Sports Asia has been replaced by the new dedicated rugby channel, Rugby Pass TV which launched its OTT service first, since February 2016. Rugby Pass was later shut down due to the effects of the COVID-19 pandemic, and Premier Sports Asia took over the acquisition of all Rugby Pass subscribers in 2021.

==== United States ====
Setanta Sports previously broadcast in the United States with Setanta Sports USA from 2005 to 2010. Fox Sports purchased the network's programming rights out of bankruptcy, adding them to Fox Soccer Channel's existing schedule and that of a new network, Fox Soccer Plus.

==== Other business ====
- In 2009, Setanta Sports had shares in OneVision. OneVision were initially given the opportunity to develop the digital terrestrial network in the Republic of Ireland. Negotiations with RTÉ Networks fell through in May 2010.
- From March 2010, Setanta Sports, in partnership with Jennings Bet, have provided setantabet.com, an online gaming service for customers within Ireland.
- In October 2010, Setanta Sports launched applications on the iPhone and a Setanta Goals service for other handsets.

== See also ==
- Special 1 TV: parody television programme on Setanta Sports that featuring puppet caricatures of football personalities
- Premier Sports and FreeSports: television channels targeting the United Kingdom launched by the same management as Setanta Sports
