= Arsenal TV =

Programming
- Picture format: 16:9 SDTV
- Timeshift service: Arsenal Replay; AH TV

Ownership
- Owner: Setanta Sports, Arsenal FC, Input Media
- Sister channels: Celtic TV; ESPN America; LFC TV; Racing UK; Racing World; Rangers TV; Setanta Sports 1 Setanta Sports 2 Setanta Golf; Setanta Ireland; Setanta Sports News

History
- Launched: 14 January 2008
- Closed: 9 August 2009
- Replaced by: Arsenal Player; Arsenal on YouTube

Links
- Website: tv.arsenal.com

Arsenal TV was a sports television channel devoted to coverage of the English football club Arsenal F.C. Until June 2009, it was a part of the Setanta Sports package and was similar to Setanta's other channels Celtic TV, Rangers TV and LFC TV.

Arsenal TV has been continued in the way of its successors being Arsenal's Web Player and Arsenal on YouTube.

== History ==
On 30 September 2007, Arsenal FC entered into a joint-venture agreement with Setanta Sports to launch a television channel dedicated to the club. The channel launched on 14 January 2008 on Sky channel 423. The TV channel screened on Monday to Fridays from 4:30pm-2:00am and Sundays from 6:00pm-2am.

On 17 March 2008, a timeshift network, Arsenal Replay was added to Sky Channel 424 (which later moved to 448). Broadcasting from 1:30am-7:45am, Arsenal Replay timeshifted Arsenal TV's schedule during the nighttime hours, and was broadcast under a short-term one-year contract in case Setanta needed the space to launch full-time additional networks. The channel only broadcast on Mondays, Wednesdays and Fridays, and did not timeshift the Sunday schedule.

Arsenal TV became available on Virgin Media on 18 March 2008 after a successful campaign by the club to get the channel on the service; it was available as part of the Setanta Sports package or TV Size XL.

On 12 May 2008, a second timeshift service, AH TV was added to Sky Channel 454. The channel was a duplicate of Arsenal Replay except for a different digital onscreen graphic, and that it broadcast on Tuesdays and Thursdays.

On 16 July 2008, Arsenal TV moved to Sky Channel 435, while Arsenal Replay moved to Sky Channel 448.

On 27 March and 28 April 2009, respectively, Arsenal Replay and AH TV were removed from the Sky EPG following the expirations of their year-long contracts.

== Closure ==
On 23 June 2009, a majority of Setanta's networks were shut down following the broadcaster's financial difficulties and collapse into administration in the United Kingdom. Arsenal announced that Arsenal TV would continue broadcasting in the short term but that the club would evaluate its long-term viability. On 22 July 2009, Setanta Sports administrator Deloitte announced that it would sell Setanta Sports' Sky Digital EPG slots through Canis Media, including Arsenal TV's slot on channel 435.

On 31 July 2009, Arsenal announced that because of Setanta Sports' administration and lack of resources to run a channel on its own, Arsenal TV would no longer be available on the Sky platform until further notice. Within this time, the club had explored alternative options regarding the future of Arsenal TV. However, for the short term, Arsenal TV was exclusively available online fully through the club's online channel, Arsenal Player and partly YouTube. All of Arsenal's friendly matches prior to the 2009-10 season were shown exclusively on Arsenal TV Online apart from the Emirates Cup.

On 4 August, the channel space on Virgin Media was replaced with an on-screen slate citing that the channel had ceased broadcasting, with the channel eventually being removed from the service a week later.

On 6 August, after carrying a similar on-screen closure message during the channel's downtime since 4 August, the channel's broadcast space on Sky went blank. The following day on the 7th of August, the channel was removed from the Sky EPG.

== Content ==
Their featured content on Arsenal TV, and now on Arsenal Player and Arsenal on YouTube included:

- Replays of every Arsenal match in all competitions, including post match coverage and analysis
- Exclusive interviews with staff and players
- Live coverage of Arsenal Reserves and first-team friendly matches
- Highlights of Arsenal Academy and Arsenal Ladies (now Arsenal Women)matches.
- Arsenal -related news
- Highlights of classic matches
- Documentaries based on the club's history
