= Safe as Houses (TV programme) =

- Genre: Property
- Presented by: Ali Douglas, Fergus Muirhead
- Country of origin: United Kingdom
- No. of series: 1
- No. of episodes: 8

Production
- Running time: 30 minutes (including adverts)
- Production company: STV Studios

Original release
- Network: STV
- Release: 19 July – 6 September 2007

Safe as Houses is a Scottish television property programme on STV, hosted by sports broadcaster Ali Douglas and money advisor Fergus Muirhead.

The programme aimed to help viewers, whether they are a first time buyer or looking to expand their property empire.

Safe as Houses began airing on Thursday 19 July 2007, with the series ending on 6 September 2007.
