= LFC TV =

Official TV channel of Liverpool F.C.

Programming
- Picture format: 576i (16:9 SDTV); 1080i (HDTV)

Ownership
- Owner: Liverpool F.C.

History
- Launched: 20 September 2007

Links
- Website: liverpoolfc.com/lfctv

Availability

Streaming media
- LFCTV GO: Part of the e-Season Ticket

LFCTV (Liverpool F.C. TV) is the dedicated official channel for English football club Liverpool F.C. which launched on 20 September 2007. It was formerly offered as part of the Setanta Sports package, but is currently a stand-alone channel.

The channel has also always been broadcast live on the club's official website as part of the e-Season Ticket subscription, the site's premium content offering.

On 28 October 2014, LFCTV launched in HD on Sky channel 455. At the same time, it became a premium channel.

On 1 June 2018, the standard-definition channel closed on Sky, and did so on Virgin Media on 30 January 2019.

== History ==
Following its entry into the UK sports market, Setanta Sports offered to create dedicated sports channels for numerous football clubs. These included LFCTV plus Arsenal TV, Celtic TV and Rangers TV, which operated in a similar manner to the existing and independently operated MUTV and Chelsea TV. Setanta declined to put a value on each of the initial three-year deals, but included rights payments from Setanta to each club, as well as payments for a package of marketing and promotional rights.

Launched in September 2007, with branding designed by Michael Sutton-Long at Liquid TV, the channel is broadcast seven days a week between the hours of 10:00 UTC and 01:30 UTC. Following the demise of Setanta Sports GB, it was available free-to-view on Sky and it was available on Virgin Media's XL Pack until 28 October 2014, when the HD version launched. It is also available via the club's premium online subscription package, LFCTV Online.

On 14 October 2009, the channel made history by becoming the first club channel to broadcast a World Cup qualifying match live, when it showed the 2010 FIFA World Cup qualification - UEFA Group 5 match between Bosnia and Herzegovina and Spain, which Spain went on to win 5-2, which resulted in them finishing their group with a 100% record.

LFCTV moved studios in Summer 2010 and for a period stopped broadcasting live shows, the broadcasting hours were also reduced to 12 hours per day. On 12 July 2010 the channel resumed live broadcasting from their new studio which has views of the Royal Liver Building and the Church of Our Lady and Saint Nicholas, Liverpool behind the set.

From August 2011, the club started to broadcast a pre-match show for an hour live from Anfield before each home game from an outside studio in one of the hospitality boxes in the centenary stand, with a live show also at half time and at full time. LFCTV broadcast a live build-up show from outside Wembley Stadium from the morning and right up to kick-off time of both the 2012 FA Cup Final and 2012 Football League Cup Final. They also broadcast a live post game analysis show after both finals, with exclusive coverage and interviews from the Liverpool dressing room after the victorious League cup final. For the 2012–13 season the channel broadcast full match commentary of each home game with commentary from Steve Hunter and a guest, usually Gary Gillespie or David Fairclough. During the commentary live pictures of the crowd inside the stadium is shown and also pictures of the commentary team.

For the 2013–14 season the pre-match and post match coverage for home matches is presented from the TV studio in the Centenary Stand at Anfield with live match commentary of all home and away matches provided with the screen displaying the match score and match time.

== Channel content ==
- Exclusive interviews with staff and players
- Full ninety-minute replays of every Liverpool match in the Premier League, Champions League and League Cup, including post match coverage & studio analysis
- Pre-match coverage of all Liverpool home games in live @ anfield
- Pre match analysis and chat in Big Match Build Up every Friday at 18.00
- Live news programme, 'You're on LFCTV' at 18.00GMT (repeated at 22.30GMT) Every Monday
- Classic matches including the top one hundred Premier League games
- Many Liverpool friendlies and all reserve games are broadcast live
- Interactive studio discussions and call-in show, "This is Anfield" with former Liverpool players, supporters, celebrity fans and football experts
- Goals, Goals, Goals shows Liverpool goals on various themes including goals from players from a particular era, season, position, against certain teams etc.
- LFC's Most Wanted is a countdown of the most watched videos on the official website.
- Documentaries based on the club's history
- News from in and around the training ground with 'Inside Melwood'.
- "60 Minutes with" interviews with current and past players.
- The John Barnes show which was first shown in 2007. The show sees former player Barnes interviewing past players and personalities from the club in a talk show type setting.
- "John Bishop meets..." where comedian and lifelong Liverpool fan John Bishop talks to former players about their experience and time at the club.
- Celebrity Kop Club where famous Liverpool fans are interviewed about their love for the club.
- Press Box a chat with regional journalists about reds news.
- Kop Talkin - A chat covering all reds news over the week.
- #LFCWORLD
- LFC360
- LFC's Most Exciting Games - A countdown of Liverpool's top 100 most exciting Premier League games. This was first shown during the summer of 2012.
- The Liverpool Library - Each programme features a new or recently released LFC themed book with an interview with the author.
- Thursday Night Live - A live studio show featuring guest interviews and previews of the weekends game. This show started for the 2013–14 season and replaced the previous show Friday Night Live.
- LFC Now- Daily news bulletin with all of the latest news from the club with interviews and match highlights.

== Presenters ==
- Peter McDowall - Lead TV presenter and commentator, pitchside announcer
- Claire Rourke - since 2007
- Paul Salt - Real Radio presenter
- Sophie Fairclough - David Fairclough's Daughter
- John Barnes - former Liverpool and England footballer presented the John Barnes Show in 2007
- John Bishop - comedian and lifelong fan.
- Alastair Mann - Freelance TV Presenter.
- Peter Stevenson - Freelance TV Presenter.
- Steve Hothersall - Radio City presenter.
- Mark Benstead - freelance TV presenter
- Rosanna Davison - briefly in 2013, former Miss World, daughter of Chris de Burgh.
- Amanda Burden - USA based presenter since December 2013.
