= Adjarasport =

Georgian sports platform

adjarasport
- Company type: Private
- Founded: 2013; 13 years ago
- Headquarters: Tbilisi, Georgia
- Owner: Adjara.com
- Founder: Adjara.com
- Industry: Media
- Services: TV channels, News Agency and Sports Management
- Subsidiaries: Setanta Sports Eurasia
- Website: adjarasport.com, adjarasport.org and adjara.com

Adjarasport (Georgian: აჭარასპორტი ach’arasp’ort’i) is a Georgian sports platform, which was founded by adjara.com in 2013.

Adjarasport includes two television channels adjarasport1 and adjarasport2, also News Agency, that covers important events in Georgian and World sport.

Television platform of adjarasport was formed in 2019 after rebranding. Adjarasport owns exclusive rights to cover The Premier League, Austrian Bundesliga, association cups of Spain, Italy., Germany, Portugal and England, MMA, UFC and women's and men's tennis tournaments.

Television content of Adjarasport is available to every citizen, living in Georgia. People also can see reviews of football, tennis, MMA and UFC rounds, interviews of sportsmen, discussion of matches and other entertaining and cognitive TV shows.

== History ==
The company was founded in 2013 and after that it is one of the main platforms in Georgia for those interested in sport. In 2019 adjarasport created first Georgian sports streaming platform adjarasport.tennis, where spectators saw more than 35 main tennis tournaments.

Since May 2018 Adjarasport has been offering Sumo translations for Georgian audience not only on social media, but also on adjarasport channel. This decision increased number of people interested in Sumo and made it as more popular kind of sport. More than 50 000 spectators watched live fight of Hakuhō Shō and Tochinoshin Tsuyoshi.

In 2017 company established online platform Fight Night Georgia, where lovers of martial art were joined and since 2019 using this platform and adjarasport.tv, adjarasport has been offering UFC fights in live to Georgian audience.

In Summer of 2019 adjarasport gained exclusive right of the most popular football championship, Premier League translation. Georgian audience can watch matches of Premier League not only on TV but also via streaming platform adjarasport.tv.

Also in 2019 company bought translation rights of English Association Cup and cups of Spain, Italy, Germany and Portugal. In the result adjarasport became one of the main sports media holding in the region.

== TV presenters ==
Presenters of sports events on TV include former Georgian national team and Premier League member Zura Khizanishvi. Tennis is presented by Sandro Kavtaradze, and UFC by Mindia Tsiklauri and Lado Natsvlishvili. Sports news is presented daily by Sandro Sapanadze. Leko Jakeli presents football events and other news.
