= La Liga =

Spanish association football league

LaLiga EA Sports
- Organising body: Liga Nacional de Fútbol Profesional
- Founded: 1929; 97 years ago
- Country: Spain
- Confederation: UEFA
- President: Javier Tebas
- Number of clubs: 20 (since 1997–98)
- Level on pyramid: 1st
- Relegation to: Segunda División
- Domestic cup(s): Copa del Rey; Supercopa de España
- International cup(s): UEFA Champions League; UEFA Europa League; UEFA Conference League
- Current champions: Barcelona (29th title) (2025–26)
- Most championships: Real Madrid (36 titles)
- Most appearances: Andoni Zubizarreta; Joaquín (622 each)
- Top scorer: Lionel Messi (474)
- Broadcasters: List of broadcasters
- Sponsor: EA Sports
- Website: laliga.com
- Current: 2026–27 La Liga

The Campeonato Nacional de Liga de Primera División, (Note: Spanish: [kampeoˈnato naθjoˈnal de ˈliɣa ðe pɾiˈmeɾa ðiβiˈsjon]; "First Division National League Championship".) commonly known as the Primera División (Note: "First Division") or La Liga, (Note: officially stylised as LaLiga from 2015 to 2023, and LALIGA from 2023) and officially known as LaLiga EA Sports (Note: stylised as all caps) for sponsorship reasons, is a professional association football league in Spain and the highest level of the Spanish football league system. Governed by the Liga Nacional de Fútbol Profesional, it is contested by 20 teams over 38 matchdays.

A total of 63 teams have competed in La Liga since its inception. Nine clubs have been crowned Spanish champions. Real Madrid and Barcelona have dominated the competition, with 36 and 29 titles respectively. Other successful clubs include Valencia, Atlético Madrid, Athletic Bilbao, and Real Sociedad, while Deportivo La Coruña have also won the title, reflecting a history of success across several Spanish clubs.

As of the 2024–25 season, La Liga is ranked third in the UEFA coefficient rankings based on performances in European competitions over the past five seasons, behind England's Premier League and Italy's Serie A. La Liga has led the coefficient rankings for more years than any other league and has produced the continent's top-rated club more often than any other league. Its clubs have won more UEFA Champions League (20), UEFA Europa League (14), UEFA Super Cup (17) and FIFA Club World Cup (8) titles than those of any other league, while its players have accumulated the most Ballon d'Or awards (24), The Best FIFA Men's Player awards (19) (Note: Including FIFA World Player of the Year.) and UEFA Men's Player of the Year awards (12). (Note: Including UEFA Club Footballer of the Year.)

La Liga is one of the world's most popular professional sports leagues, with an average attendance of 26,933 for league matches in the 2018–19 season. This is the eighth-highest of any domestic professional sports league and the third-highest of any professional association football league, behind the Premier League and the Bundesliga. By revenue, La Liga ranks seventh among professional sports leagues worldwide, behind the NFL, MLB, the NBA, the Premier League, the NHL and the Bundesliga.

== Competition format ==
The competition format follows the usual double round-robin format. During the course of a season, which lasts from August to May, each club plays every other club twice, once at home and once away, for 38 matches. Teams receive three points for a win, one point for a draw, and no points for a loss. Teams are ranked by total points, with the highest-ranked club crowned champion at the end of the season.

=== Promotion and relegation ===
A system of promotion and relegation exists between the Primera División and the Segunda División. The three lowest placed teams in La Liga are relegated to the Segunda División, and the top two teams from the Segunda División promoted to La Liga, with an additional club promoted after a series of play-offs involving the third, fourth, fifth and sixth placed clubs. Below is a complete record of how many teams played in each season throughout the league's history;

Number of clubs in La Liga throughout the years
Period (in years)	No. of clubs
1929–1934	10 clubs
1934–1941	12 clubs
1941–1950	14 clubs
1950–1971	16 clubs
1971–1987	18 clubs
1987–1995	20 clubs
1995–1997	22 clubs
1997–present	20 clubs

=== Tie breaker rules ===
If points are equal between two or more clubs, the rules are:

- If all clubs involved have played each other twice:
  - If the tie is between two clubs, then the tie is broken using the head-to-head goal difference for those clubs (without away goals rule).
  - If the tie is between more than two clubs, then the tie is broken using the games the clubs have played against each other:
    - a) head-to-head points
    - b) head-to-head goal difference
- If two legged games between all clubs involved have not been played, or the tie is not broken by the rules above, it is broken using:
  - a) total goal difference
  - b) total goals scored
- If the tie is still not broken, the winner will be determined by Fair Play scales. These are:
  - yellow card, 1 point
  - doubled yellow card/ejection, 2 points
  - direct red card, 3 points
  - suspension or disqualification of coach, executive or other club personnel (outside referees' decisions), 5 points
  - misconduct of the supporters: mild 5 points, serious 6 points, very serious 7 points
  - stadium closure, 10 points
  - if the Competition Committee removes a penalty, the points are also removed
- If the tie is still not broken, it will be resolved with a tie-break match in a neutral stadium.

=== Qualification for European competitions ===
==== 1954-1998 ====
Seas	European Cup/UEFA Champions League	Inter-Cities Fairs Cup/UEFA Cup/UEFA Europa League	Cup Winners' Cup
1954/55-1958/59	League champions (+ EC/UCL champions of the previous season)	Invitation only	
1959/60-1960/61	League champions (+ EC/UCL champions of the previous season)	Invitation only	Copa del Rey winners (+CWC title holder)
1961/62-1967/68	League champions (+ EC/UCL champions of the previous season)	Invitation only	Copa del Rey winners (+CWC title holder)
1968/69-1970/71	League champions (+ EC/UCL champions of the previous season)	2nd-5th place	Copa del Rey winners (+CWC title holder)
1971/72-1980/81	League champions (+ EC/UCL champions of the previous season)	2nd-4th place (+ UEFA Cup title holder)	Copa del Rey winners (+CWC title holder)
1981/82	League champions (+ EC/UCL champions of the previous season)	2nd-5th place (+ UEFA Cup title holder)	Copa del Rey winners (+CWC title holder)
1982/83-1983/84	League champions (+ EC/UCL champions of the previous season)	2nd-4th place (+UEFA Cup title holder and Copa de la Liga winners)	Copa del Rey winners (+CWC title holder)
1984/85	League champions (+ EC/UCL champions of the previous season)	2nd-5th place (+UEFA Cup title holder and Copa de la Liga winners)	Copa del Rey winners (+CWC title holder)
1985/86	League champions (+ EC/UCL champions of the previous season)	2nd-4th place (+UEFA Cup title holder and Copa de la Liga winners)	Copa del Rey winners (+CWC title holder)
1986/87-1988/89	League champions (+ EC/UCL champions of the previous season)	2nd-4th place (+ UEFA Cup title holder)	Copa del Rey winners (+CWC title holder)
1989/90-1990/91	League champions (+ EC/UCL champions of the previous season)	2nd-5th place (+ UEFA Cup title holder)	Copa del Rey winners (+CWC title holder)
1991/92-1992/93	League champions (+ EC/UCL champions of the previous season)	2nd-5th place (+ UEFA Cup title holder)	Copa del Rey winners (+CWC title holder)
1993/94-1995/96	League champions (+ EC/UCL champions of the previous season)	2nd-4th place (+ UEFA Cup title holder)	Copa del Rey winners (+CWC title holder)
1996/97	League champions (+ UCL champions of the previous season) qualified for group stage; 2nd place qualifies for 2nd qualifying round	2nd-4th place (+ UEFA Cup title holder)	Copa del Rey winners (+CWC title holder)

==== 1997-present ====
Seas	UEFA CL	UEFA Cup/UEFA EL	UEFA CWC	Intertoto Cup	UEFA Conference League
1997/98	League champions (+ UCL champions of the previous season) qualified for group stage; 2nd place qualifies for 2nd qualifying round	3rd-5th place (+ UEFA Cup title holder)	Copa del Rey winners (+CWC title holder)	8th qualifies for 3rd round; 9th for 2nd round	
1998/99-2003/04	League champions (+ UCL champions of the previous season) and 2nd place qualified for group stage (max. 3 berths); 3rd and 4th place qualifies for 2nd qualifying round	5th and 6th place (+ UEFA Cup title holder and Copa del Rey winners) qualified for first round; UEFA Fair Play berth given for qualifying round		7th qualifies for 3rd round; 8th for 2nd round (places depend on withdrawals)	
2004/05	League champions (+ UCL champions of the previous season) and 2nd place qualified for group stage (max. 3 berths); 3rd and 4th place qualifies for 2nd qualifying round	5th and 6th place (+ UEFA Cup title holder and Copa del Rey winners) qualified for first round; UEFA Fair Play berth given for qualifying round		7th qualifies for 3rd round; 8th and 9th for 2nd round (places depend on withdrawals)	
2005/06-2007/08	League champions (+ UCL champions of the previous season) and 2nd place qualified for group stage (max. 3 berths); 3rd and 4th place qualifies for 2nd qualifying round	5th and 6th place (+ UEFA Cup title holder and Copa del Rey winners) qualified for first round; UEFA Fair Play berth given for qualifying round		7th qualifies for 3rd round (places depend on withdrawals)	
2008/09	League champions (+ UCL champions of the previous season), 2nd and 3rd place qualified for group stage; 4th place qualifies for 2nd qualifying round	5th and 6th place qualified for play-offs, Copa del Rey winners qualified for 3rd qualifying round and UEFA Fair Play berth given for 1st qualifying round			
2009/10-2013/14	League champions (+ UCL champions of the previous season), 2nd and 3rd place qualified for group stage; 4th place qualifies for play-offs	5th and 6th place qualified for play-offs, Copa del Rey winners qualified for 3rd qualifying round and UEFA Fair Play berth given for 1st qualifying round; UEFA EL title holder qualified for group stage			
2014/15-2017/18	League champions (+ UCL and UEL champions of the previous season), 2nd and 3rd place qualified for group stage; 4th place qualifies for play-offs	5th place and Copa del Rey winners qualified for group stage, 6th place qualified for 3rd qualifying round			
2018/19-2019/20	Top four (+ UEL champions of the previous season),qualified for group stage	5th, 6th place and Copa del Rey winners qualified for group stage, 7th place qualified for 2nd qualifying round			
2020/21-2022/23	Top four (+ UEL champions of the previous season),qualified for group stage	5th, 6th place and Copa del Rey winners qualified for group stage			7th place qualifies for play-off round

==== Current criteria (in use since 2023) ====
The top four teams in La Liga qualify for the subsequent season's UEFA Champions League league stage, with a possible fifth dependent on Spain's UEFA Coefficient for the previous season. The winners of the UEFA Champions League and UEFA Europa League also qualify for the subsequent season's UEFA Champions League league stage.

The fifth place team in La Liga and the winner of the Copa del Rey also qualify for the subsequent season's UEFA Europa League group stage. However, if the winner also finished in the top five places in La Liga, then this place reverts to the team that finished sixth in La Liga. Furthermore, the sixth place (or seventh if sixth already qualifies due to the Copa del Rey) team qualifies for the subsequent season's UEFA Conference League play-off round.

The number of places allocated to Spanish clubs in UEFA competitions is dependent upon the position a country holds in the UEFA country coefficients, which are calculated based upon the performance of teams in UEFA competitions over a five-year period. As of the end of the 2025–26 season, the ranking of Spain (and de facto La Liga) is second.

== History ==
=== Foundation ===
In April 1928, José María Acha, a director at Arenas de Getxo, first proposed the idea of a national league in Spain. After much debate about the size of the league and who would take part, the Real Federación Española de Fútbol eventually agreed on the ten teams who would form the first Primera División in 1929. Arenas, Barcelona, Real Madrid, Athletic Bilbao, Real Sociedad and Real Unión were all selected as previous winners of the Copa del Rey. Atlético Madrid, Espanyol and Europa qualified as Copa del Rey runners-up and Racing de Santander qualified through a knockout competition. Only three of the founding clubs (Real Madrid, Barcelona, and Athletic Bilbao) have never been relegated from the Primera División.

=== 1930s: Athletic Bilbao dominate ===
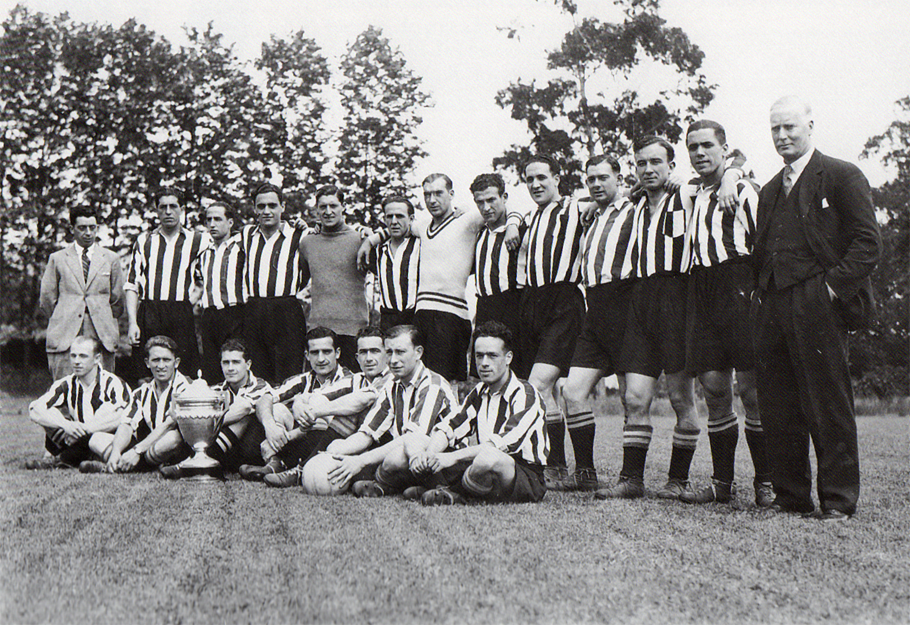
Athletic Bilbao team in 1933.

Although Barcelona won the first Liga in 1929 and Ricardo Zamora's Real Madrid won their first titles in 1932 and 1933, it was Athletic Bilbao that set the early pace winning La Liga in 1930, 1931, 1934 and 1936 (in addition to four Copa trophies), and they also achieved the biggest win in La Liga history by beating Barcelona 11–1; This team, coached by Fred Pentland, is known by the nickname First historic squad, notably forming an attacking partnership with Bata, Guillermo Gorostiza, José Iraragorri, Chirri II and Lafuente. In 1935, Real Betis, then known as Betis Balompié, won their only title to date. Primera División was suspended during the Spanish Civil War.

In 1937, the teams in the Republican area of Spain, with the notable exception of the two Madrid clubs, competed in the Mediterranean League and Barcelona emerged as champions. Seventy years later, on 28 September 2007, Barcelona requested the Royal Spanish Football Federation (Spanish acronym RFEF) to recognise that title as a Liga title. This action was taken after RFEF was asked to recognise Levante's Copa de la España Libre win as equivalent to Copa del Rey trophy. Nevertheless, the governing body of Spanish football has not made an outright decision yet.

=== 1940s: Atlético Madrid, Barcelona and Valencia emerge ===
Results of the five champions during the post-war years
Season	ATM	BAR	ATH	SEV	VAL
1939–40	1	9	3	2	8
1940–41	1	4	2	5	3
1941–42	3	12	7	6	1
1942–43	8	3	1	2	7
1943–44	2	6	10	3	1
1944–45	3	1	6	10	5
1945–46	7	2	3	1	6
1946–47	3	4	2	6	1
1947–48	3	1	6	5	2
1948–49	4	1	6	8	2
1949–50	1	5	6	10	3
TOTAL	3	3	1	1	3
Top three	8	4	5	4	7
La Liga champions Copa del Generalísimo; La Liga/Copa del Generalísimo double

With the Primera División resuming after the Spanish Civil War, it was Atlético Aviación (nowadays Atlético Madrid), Valencia, and Barcelona that emerged as the strongest clubs. Atlético were only awarded a place during the 1939–40 season as a replacement for Real Oviedo, whose ground had been damaged during the war. The club subsequently won its first Liga title and retained it in 1941. While other clubs lost players to exile, execution, and as casualties of the war, the Atlético team was reinforced by a merger. The young, pre-war squad of Valencia had also remained intact and in the post-war years matured into champions, gaining three Liga titles in 1942, 1944, and 1947. They were also runners-up in 1948 and 1949.

Athletic Bilbao was one of the clubs most affected by the war, since many of its players (sympathizers of the Republican faction) went into exile in Latin America and very few returned. But thanks to a search for young talents, they managed to form the well-known Second historic squad made up of Rafael Iriondo, Venancio Pérez, José Luis Panizo, Agustín Gaínza and the mythical scorer Telmo Zarra (Spanish top scorer in La Liga history, among other records). They won a La Liga and Copa del Generalísimo double in 1943 and won the Cup again in 1944, 1945 and 1950, in addition to an Copa Eva Duarte (official predecessor of the Supercopa). Sevilla also enjoyed a brief golden era, finishing as runners-up in 1940 and 1942 before winning their only title to date in 1946.

Meanwhile, on the other side of Spain, Barcelona began to emerge as a force under Josep Samitier. A Spanish footballer for both Barcelona and Real Madrid, Samitier cemented his legacy with Barcelona. During his playing career with Barcelona he scored 133 goals, won the inaugural La Liga title and five Copa Del Rey. In 1944, Samitier returned to Barcelona as a coach and guided them in winning their second La Liga title in 1945. Under Samitier and players César Rodríguez, Josep Escolà, Estanislau Basora and Mariano Gonzalvo, Barcelona dominated La Liga in the late 1940s, winning back to back La Liga titles in 1948 and 1949. The 1940s proved to be a successful season for Barcelona, winning three La Liga titles and one Copa Del Rey, but the 1950s proved to be a decade of dominance, not just from Barcelona, but from Real Madrid.

=== 1950s: Barcelona and Real Madrid Dominate ===
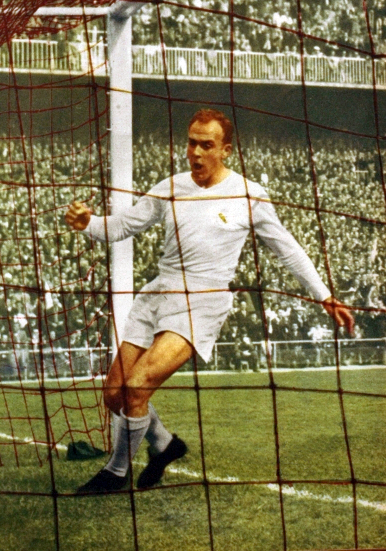
Naturalised Argentine Alfredo Di Stéfano was part of a dominant Real Madrid side in the 1950s

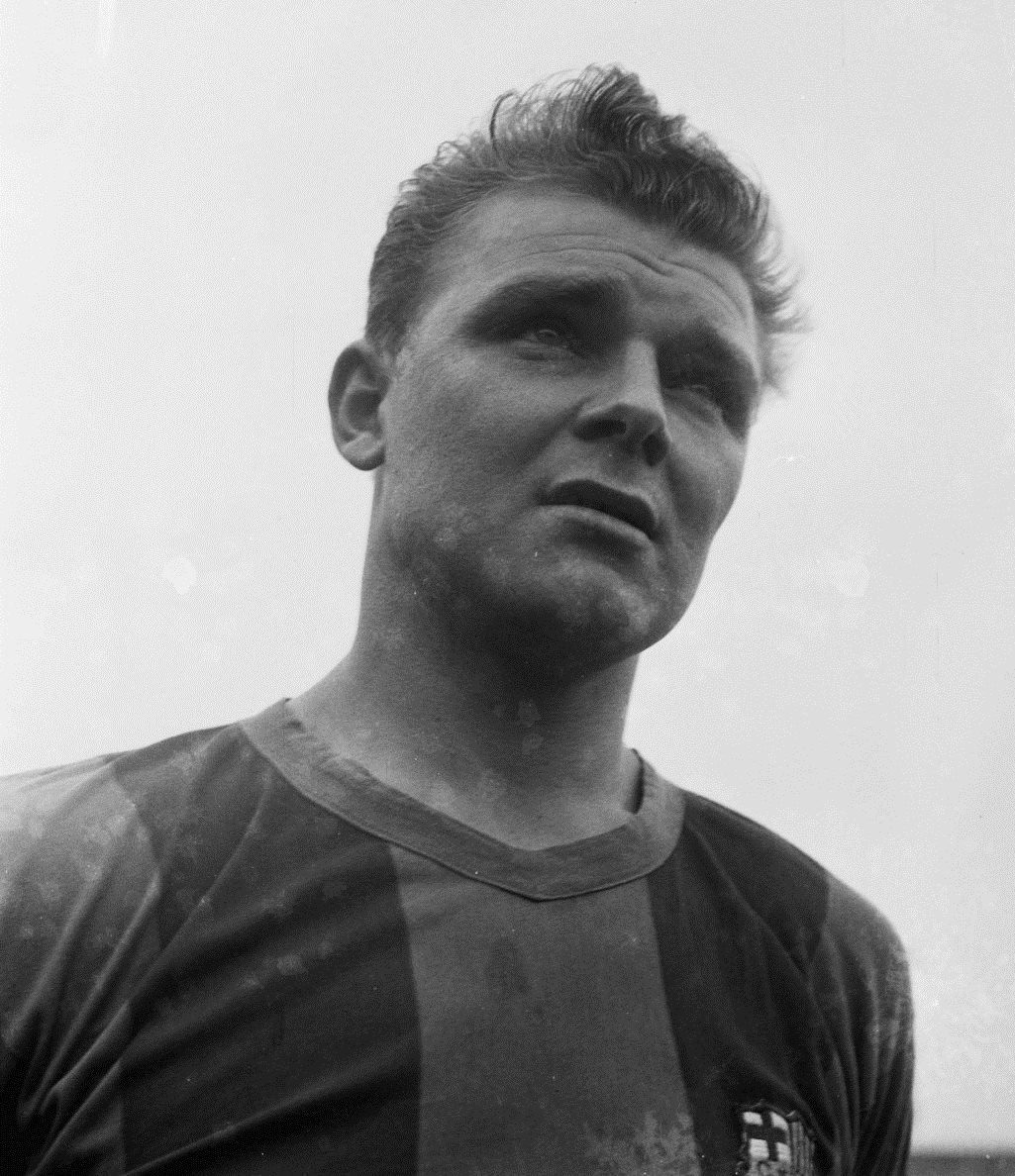
During the 1950s, László Kubala was a leading member of Barcelona, scoring 194 goals in 256 appearances.

Although Atlético Madrid, previously known as ''Atlético Aviación'', were champions in 1950 and 1951 under mastermind Helenio Herrera, the 1950s continued the success Barcelona had during the late 1940s.

During this decade, Barcelona's first golden era emerged under coach Ferdinand Daučík, winning back-to-back La Liga and Copa Del Rey doubles in 1951–52 and 1952–53. In 1952, Barcelona made history yet again by winning five distinctive trophies in one year. This team, composed of László Kubala, Mariano Gonzalvo, César Rodríguez Álvarez, and Joan Segarra, won La Liga, Copa Del Rey, Copa Eva Duarte (predecessor of Spanish Super Cup), Latin Cup and Copa Martini & Rossi. Their success in winning five trophies in one year earned them the name 'L'equip de les cinc Copes' or The Team of the Five Cups.

In the latter parts of the 1950s, coached by Helenio Herrera and featuring Luis Suárez, Barcelona won yet again back-to-back La Ligas, winning them in 1959 and 1960. In 1959, Barcelona also won another double of La Liga and the Copa Del Rey, conquering three doubles in the 1950s.

The 1950s also saw the beginning of the Real Madrid dominance. During the 1930s through the 1950s, there were strict limits imposed on foreign players. In most cases, clubs could have only three foreign players in their squads, meaning that at least eight local players had to play in every game. During the 1950s, however, these rules were circumvented by Real Madrid, who naturalised Alfredo Di Stéfano and Ferenc Puskás. Di Stéfano, Puskás, Raymond Kopa and Francisco Gento formed the nucleus of the Real Madrid team that dominated the second half of the 1950s. Real Madrid won their third La Liga in 1954 — their first since 1933 — and retained their title in 1955. In 1956, Athletic Bilbao won their sixth La Liga title, but Real Madrid won La Liga again in 1957 and 1958.

All in all, Barcelona and Real Madrid won four La Liga titles each in the 1950s, with Atlético Madrid winning two and Athletic Bilbao winning one during this decade.

=== 1960s–1970s: Real Madrid superiority ===
Real Madrid dominated La Liga between 1960 and 1980, being crowned champions 14 times. Real Madrid won five La Liga titles in a row from 1961 to 1965 as well as winning three doubles between 1960 and 1980. During the 1960s and 1970s, only Atlético Madrid offered Real Madrid any serious challenge. Atlético Madrid were crowned La Liga champions four times in 1966, 1970, 1973, and 1977. Atlético Madrid also finished second place in 1961, 1963, and 1965. In 1971, Valencia won their fourth La Liga title in 1971 under Alfredo Di Stéfano, and the Johan Cruyff-inspired Barcelona won their ninth La Liga in 1974.

=== 1980s: Real Madrid dominate but the Basque Clubs disrupt their monopoly ===
Real Madrid's monopoly in La Liga was interrupted significantly in the 1980s. Although Real Madrid won another five La Liga titles from 1986 to 1990 under the brilliance of Emilio Butragueño and Hugo Sánchez, the Basque clubs of Real Sociedad and Athletic Bilbao also dominated the 1980s. Real Sociedad won their first La Liga titles in 1981 and 1982; Luis Arconada, Roberto López Ufarte and Txiki Begiristain stood out from this team. Later, Athletic Bilbao also managed to win two consecutive La Liga titles in 1983 and 1984, also achieving their fifth La Liga and Copa del Rey double in 1984; The stars Andoni Zubizarreta, Santi Urkiaga, Andoni Goikoetxea, Dani, Manuel Sarabia and Estanislao Argote made this success possible. For its part, Barcelona won their tenth La Liga title in 1985 under coach Terry Venables, their first La Liga win since 1974.

=== 1990s: Barcelona's Dream Team ===
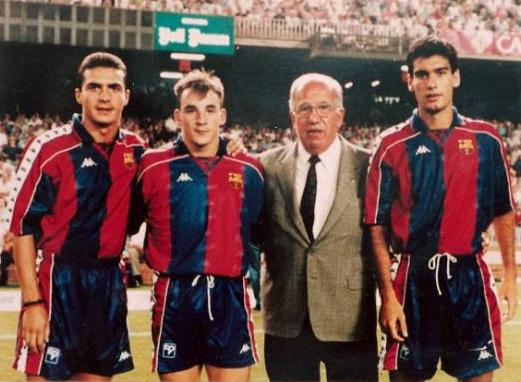
La Masia graduates Guillermo Amor, Albert Ferrer and Pep Guardiola.

Johan Cruyff returned to Barcelona as manager in 1988, and assembled the legendary Dream Team. When Cruyff took control of his Barcelona side, they had won only two La Liga titles in the past 20 years. Cruyff decided to build a team composed of international stars and La Masia graduates in order to restore Barcelona to their former glory days. This team was formed by international stars Romario, Michael Laudrup, Hristo Stoichkov and Ronald Koeman. Cruyff's Dream Team also consisted of La Masia graduates Pep Guardiola, Albert Ferrer and Guillermo Amor, as well as Basque Andoni Zubizarreta.

Johan Cruyff changed the way modern football was played, and incorporated the principles of Total Football into this team. The success of possession-based football was revolutionary, and Cruyff's team won their first European Cup in 1992 and four consecutive La Liga titles between 1991 and 1994. In total, Cruyff won eleven trophies in eight years, making him the most successful manager in Barcelona's history, until the record was broken by his protégé Pep Guardiola two decades later.

Barcelona's run ended with Real Madrid winning La Liga in 1995. Atlético Madrid won their ninth La Liga title in 1996, as well as their only Liga/Copa Del Rey double, before Real Madrid added another league title to their cabinet in 1997. After the success of Cruyff, another Dutchman – Ajax manager, Louis van Gaal – arrived at the Camp Nou, and with the talents of Luís Figo, Luis Enrique, and Rivaldo, Barcelona won the La Liga title in 1998 and 1999, including their fourth double of Liga and Copa Del Rey in 1998. All in all, Barcelona won six La Liga titles in the 1990s.

=== 2000s: Real Madrid, Barcelona and Valencia's re-emergence ===
Results of Barça and Real Madrid in the 21st century
Season	BAR	RMA
2000–01	4	1
2001–02	4	3
2002–03	6	1
2003–04	2	4
2004–05	1	2
2005–06	1	2
2006–07	2	1
2007–08	3	1
2008–09	1	2
2009–10	1	2
2010–11	1	2
2011–12	2	1
2012–13	1	2
2013–14	2	3
2014–15	1	2
2015–16	1	2
2016–17	2	1
2017–18	1	3
2018–19	1	3
2019–20	2	1
2020–21	3	2
2021–22	2	1
2022–23	1	2
2023–24	2	1
2024–25	1	2
2025–26	1	2
Total	13	9
Top three	23	25
League champions Copa del Rey; La Liga/Copa del Rey double

The 21st century continued the success Barcelona had in the 1990s under Johan Cruyff, dominating La Liga. Although Real Madrid had been prominent, Barcelona created a hegemony in Spain not seen since the Real Madrid of the 1960s–70s. Since the start of the new century, Barcelona won ten La Ligas, including two trebles and four doubles. This new century however has also seen new challengers being crowned champions. Between 1999–2000 and 2004, Deportivo La Coruña finished in the top three on five occasions, a better record than either Real Madrid or Barcelona, and in 2000, under Javier Irureta, Deportivo became the ninth team to be crowned champions. Valencia were one of the strongest teams in Europe in the early to mid 2000s; they were crowned La Liga champions in 2002 and 2004 under Rafael Benítez, whilst also being runners-up in the UEFA Champions League in 2000 and 2001 under Hector Cuper and winning the UEFA Cup in 2004 and the Copa del Rey in 1999.

Real Madrid won their first Liga titles of the century in 2001 and 2003. With world-class players like Raúl, Ruud van Nistelrooy and Gonzalo Higuaín, Real Madrid won back-to-back La Liga titles in 2006–07 and 2007–08. Barcelona won their first title of the new millennium after Real Madrid and Valencia had shared the last four titles under the brilliance of Ronaldinho and Samuel Eto'o in the 2004–05 season. Barcelona retained the title to make it back-to-back wins in the 2005–06 season.

=== 2010s: Barcelona, Real Madrid and Atlético ===
In 2009–10, Real Madrid achieved a record 96 points but still finished behind Barcelona, who amassed 99 points. Barcelona then won a third straight La Liga title in the 2010–11 season with 96 points to Real's 92, but Real Madrid ended their winning streak in the 2011–12 season under the management of José Mourinho and with the likes of Cristiano Ronaldo, Ángel Di María, Mesut Özil and Karim Benzema. Madrid won their 32nd La Liga title with a record 100 points, a record 121 goals scored and a record +89 goal difference. The following year, in the 2012–13 season, Barcelona won yet another La Liga title under coach Tito Vilanova, replicating the 100 points record Real Madrid achieved the previous year. Atlético Madrid, under the management of Diego Simeone, won their tenth La Liga title in 2013–14, their first since 1996. They became the first team since Valencia in 2004 to win La Liga and break Barcelona and Real Madrid's dominion over the league. In the 2014–15 season, under the trio of Messi, Neymar, and Suarez nicknamed 'MSN', Barcelona made history by becoming the first team to achieve a second Treble, and winning a sixth Liga/Copa Del Rey double. Barcelona continued their dominance, and in the 2015–16 season they won a back-to-back Liga/Copa Del Rey double, something that had not been achieved since the 1950s. Real Madrid brought back the La Liga title under the management of Zinedine Zidane in 2016–17, but Barcelona won the title again in the 2017–18 season, as well as winning their eighth double, for seven La Liga titles in ten years. Barcelona retained the title yet again and won their 26th La Liga title in the 2018–19 season, for eight La Liga titles in eleven years. Real Madrid reclaimed the title in 2019–20, winning the season that was severely disrupted by the COVID-19 pandemic.

=== 2020s: present ===
The 2020–21 season started on 12 September, and was won by Atlético Madrid, with Real Madrid as runners-up. In August 2021, La Liga clubs approved a €2.7 billion deal to sell 10% of the league to CVC Capital Partners. The 2021–22 season was won by Real Madrid with four games to spare, while the 2022–23 season was won by Barcelona with four games to spare.

In 2023, La Liga rebranded itself with a new logo and new sponsor. EA (Electronic Arts) replaced the Spanish financial services giant Santander that was the title sponsor of the league for seven years. LaLiga EA Sports and LaLiga Hypermotion are the names of the Primera and Segunda Divisions, starting in the 2023–24 season and for the following four seasons. Same year, LaLiga introduced a sonic identity, deployed across broadcasts and stadiums as part of its global brand refresh. The 2023–24 season was won by Real Madrid with four games to spare.

Following the flash floods disaster that hit Spain at the end of October, claiming the lives of over 200 people, the Spanish league postponed all matches scheduled to be played in the Valencian region on Thursday. The games played after the floods opened in a moment of silence.

In December 2024, La Liga obtained a court order that allowed them to compel internet service providers to block access to IP addresses belonging to Cloudflare within Spain in an effort to block piracy sites that were using Cloudflare's services. In February 2025, the order was implemented, causing access issues to websites and services unrelated to the piracy concerns within Spain. Several football teams such as Valencia and Girona, as well as the streaming platform Movistar Plus+ were affected by the blocks. Cloudflare and cybersecurity group RootedCON filed separate legal actions thereafter to overturn the order, but the Commercial Court No. 6 of Barcelona dismissed the challenges in March, "stating that no evidence was presented to show that blocking caused any damage." Software developers created tools in response to the blocks to ensure the legitimate websites and services could still be accessed during the period when the IP addresses of piracy websites are being blocked in Spain. On November 2026, China's state broadcaster CCTV suspended its broadcasting of La Liga matches, following Mbappé's "ill-judged" remarks on the late Chinese leader Mao Zedong.

== Clubs ==
20 teams contest the league in its current season, including the top 17 sides from the 2025–26 season and three promoted from the 2025–26 Segunda División. Racing Santander and Deportivo A Coruña were promoted directly, and Málaga won the promotion play-off.

=== Stadiums and locations ===
Location of teams in 2026–27 La Liga
Location of Community of Madrid teams in 2026–27 La Liga

Team	Location	2025–26 season	First season in Primera División	Primera División seasons	Stadium	Stadium Capacity	Primera División titles	Manager
Alavés	Vitoria-Gasteiz	14th	1930–31	20	Mendizorrotza	19,840	0	Quique Sánchez Flores
Athletic Bilbao	Bilbao	12th	1929	95	San Mamés	53,289	8	Edin Terzić
Atlético Madrid	Madrid	4th	1929	89	Metropolitano Stadium	70,460	11	Diego Simeone
Barcelona	Barcelona	1st	1929	95	Camp Nou	105,367	29	Hansi Flick
Celta Vigo	Vigo	6th	1939–40	60	Balaídos	24,791	0	Claudio Giráldez
Deportivo A Coruña	A Coruña	2nd (SD)	1941–42	46	Riazor	32,490	1	Antonio Hidalgo
Elche	Elche	15th	1959–60	25	Martínez Valero	31,388	0	Martín Anselmi
Espanyol	Cornellà de Llobregat	11th	1929	89	RCDE Stadium	40,000	0	Manolo González
Getafe	Getafe	7th	2004–05	21	Coliseum	16,500	0	José Bordalás
Levante	Valencia	16th	1963–64	17	Ciutat de València	26,354	0	Luís Castro
Málaga	Málaga	4th (SD)	1999–2000	17	La Rosaleda	30,044	0	Juan Francisco Funes
Osasuna	Pamplona	17th	1935–36	44	El Sadar	23,516	0	Luis Miguel Ramis
Racing Santander	Santander	1st (SD)	1929	44	El Sardinero	22,222	0	José Alberto
Rayo Vallecano	Madrid	8th	1977–78	23	Vallecas	14,708	0	Beñat San José
Real Betis	Seville	5th	1932–33	60	La Cartuja	70,000	1	Manuel Pellegrini
Real Madrid	Madrid	2nd	1929	95	Santiago Bernabéu	84,000	36	José Mourinho
Real Sociedad	San Sebastián	10th	1929	79	Reale Arena	39,500	2	Pellegrino Matarazzo
Sevilla	Seville	13th	1934–35	82	Ramón Sánchez-Pizjuán	42,714	1	Luis García
Valencia	Valencia	9th	1931–32	91	Mestalla	49,430	6	Óscar Sánchez (interim)
Villarreal	Villarreal	3rd	1998–99	26	Estadio de la Cerámica	23,000	0	Iñigo Pérez

=== Seasons in La Liga ===
There are 63 teams that have taken part in 96 La Liga championships that were played from the 1929 season until the 2026–27 season. The teams in bold compete in La Liga currently. The teams in italics represent defunct teams. The year in parentheses represents the most recent year of participation at this level. Athletic Bilbao, Barcelona, and Real Madrid are the only teams that have played La Liga football in every season.

- **96** seasons: **Athletic Bilbao** (2027), **Barcelona** (2027), **Real Madrid** (2027)
- **92** seasons: **Valencia** (2027)
- **90** seasons: **Atlético Madrid** (2027), **Espanyol** (2027)
- **83** seasons: **Sevilla** (2027)
- **80** seasons: **Real Sociedad** (2027)
- **61** seasons: **Celta Vigo** (2027), **Real Betis** (2027)
- **58** seasons: Zaragoza (2013)
- **47** seasons: Valladolid (2025), **Deportivo A Coruña** (2027)
- **45** seasons: **Osasuna** (2027), **Racing Santander** (2027)
- **42** seasons: Sporting Gijón (2017)
- **39** seasons: Oviedo (2026)
- **36** seasons: Las Palmas (2025)
- **33** seasons: Mallorca (2026)
- **27** seasons: Granada (2024), **Villarreal** (2027)
- **26** seasons: **Elche** (2027)
- **24** seasons: **Rayo Vallecano** (2027)
- **22** seasons: **Getafe** (2027)
- **21** seasons: **Alavés** (2027)
- **20** seasons: CD Málaga (1990), Hércules (2011)
- **18** seasons: Murcia (2008), **Levante** (2027), **Málaga** (2027)
- **16** seasons: Cádiz (2024)
- **14** seasons: Sabadell (1988)
- **13** seasons: Tenerife (2010)
- **12** seasons: Salamanca (1999)
- **11** seasons: Castellón (1991)
- **9** seasons: Logroñés (1997), Córdoba (2015)
- **8** seasons: Almería (2024)
- **7** seasons: Arenas (1935), Albacete (2005), Eibar (2021)
- **6** seasons: Pontevedra (1970), Burgos (1980), Girona (2026)
- **5** seasons: Recreativo Huelva (2009), Leganés (2025)
- **4** seasons: Real Unión (1932), Alcoyano (1951), Compostela (1998), Gimnàstic (2007), Numancia (2009)
- **3** seasons: Europa (1931), Jaén (1958), Real Burgos (1993)
- **2** seasons: AD Almería (1981), Lleida (1994), Mérida (1998), Extremadura (1999), Huesca (2021)
- **1** season: Atlético Tetuán (1952), Cultural Leonesa (1956), Condal (1957), Xerez (2010)

== La Liga clubs in Europe ==
The Primera División is currently third in the UEFA rankings of European leagues based on their performances in European competitions over a five-year period, behind England's Premier League and Italy's Serie A, but ahead of Germany's Bundesliga and France's Ligue 1.

Real Madrid, Barcelona and Atlético Madrid have been in the top ten most successful clubs in European football in terms of total European trophies. These three clubs, along with Sevilla and Valencia, are the only Spanish clubs to have won five or more international trophies. Deportivo La Coruña are the joint fifth-most participating Spanish team in the Champions League with Sevilla — after Real Madrid, Barcelona, Valencia and Atlético Madrid — with five consecutive Champions League appearances, including a semi-finals appearance in 2003–04.

During the 2005–06 European season, La Liga became the first league to have its clubs win both the Champions League and UEFA Cup since 1997, as Barcelona won the UEFA Champions League and Sevilla won the UEFA Cup. This feat was repeated four times in five seasons: during the 2013–14 season Real Madrid won their tenth Champions League title and Sevilla won their third Europa League, during the 2014–15 season Barcelona won their fifth Champions League title and Sevilla won their fourth Europa League, during the 2015–16 season Real Madrid won their eleventh Champions League title and Sevilla won their fifth Europa League (becoming the first team to win the title three times in a row), and during the 2017–18 season Real Madrid won their thirteenth Champions League title and Atlético Madrid won their third Europa League.

In 2015, La Liga became the first league to enter five teams in the Champions League group stage, with Barcelona, Real Madrid, Atlético Madrid and Valencia qualifying via their league position and Sevilla qualifying by virtue of their victory in the Europa League, courtesy of a rule change.

== Champions ==
=== Performance by club ===
Performance by individual clubs in Primera División
Rank	Club	Winners	Runners-up	Winning years
1	Real Madrid	36	27	1931–32, 1932–33, 1953–54, 1954–55, 1956–57, 1957–58, 1960–61, 1961–62, 1962–63, 1963–64, 1964–65, 1966–67, 1967–68, 1968–69, 1971–72, 1974–75, 1975–76, 1977–78, 1978–79, 1979–80, 1985–86, 1986–87, 1987–88, 1988–89, 1989–90, 1994–95, 1996–97, 2000–01, 2002–03, 2006–07, 2007–08, 2011–12, 2016–17, 2019–20, 2021–22, 2023–24
2	Barcelona	29	28	1929, 1944–45, 1947–48, 1948–49, 1951–52, 1952–53, 1958–59, 1959–60, 1973–74, 1984–85, 1990–91, 1991–92, 1992–93, 1993–94, 1997–98, 1998–99, 2004–05, 2005–06, 2008–09, 2009–10, 2010–11, 2012–13, 2014–15, 2015–16, 2017–18, 2018–19, 2022–23, 2024–25, 2025–26
3	Atlético Madrid	11	10	1939–40, 1940–41, 1949–50, 1950–51, 1965–66, 1969–70, 1972–73, 1976–77, 1995–96, 2013–14, 2020–21
4	Athletic Bilbao	8	7	1929–30, 1930–31, 1933–34, 1935–36, 1942–43, 1955–56, 1982–83, 1983–84
5	Valencia	6	6	1941–42, 1943–44, 1946–47, 1970–71, 2001–02, 2003–04
6	Real Sociedad	2	3	1980–81, 1981–82
7	Deportivo La Coruña	1	5	1999–00
7	Sevilla	1	4	1945–46
7	Real Betis	1	0	1934–35

== Players ==
=== Eligibility of non-EU players ===
In La Liga in 2020, each club is allowed five non-EU players but are only allowed to name three non-EU players in each matchday squad.

Players can claim citizenship from the nation their ancestors came from. If a player does not have European ancestry, he can claim Spanish citizenship after playing in Spain for five years. Sometimes, this can lead to a triple-citizenship situation; for example, Leo Franco, who was born in Argentina, is of Italian heritage yet can claim a Spanish passport, having played in La Liga for over five years.

In addition, players from the ACP countries—countries in Africa, the Caribbean, and the Pacific that are signatories to the Cotonou Agreement—are not counted against non-EU quotas due to the Kolpak ruling.

=== Individual awards ===
Until the 2008–09 season, no official individual awards existed in La Liga. In the 2008–09 season, the governing body created the LFP Awards (now called La Liga Awards), awarded each season to individual players and coaches. The majority of these awards were discontinued after the 2015–16 season. Additional awards relating to La Liga are distributed, some not sanctioned by the Liga de Futbol Profesional or RFEF and therefore not regarded as official. The most notable of these are four awarded by Spain's largest sports paper, Marca, namely the Pichichi Trophy, awarded to the top scorer of the season; the Ricardo Zamora Trophy, for the goalkeeper with the fewest goals allowed per game (minimum 28 games); the Alfredo Di Stéfano Trophy, for the player judged to be the best overall player in the division; and the Zarra Trophy, for the top scorer among Spanish domestic players.

Since the 2013–14 season, La Liga has also bestowed the monthly manager of the month and player of the month awards.

=== Transfers ===
The first La Liga player to be involved in a transfer which broke the world record was Luis Suárez in 1961, who moved from Barcelona to Inter Milan for £152,000 (£3 million in 2025). 12 years later, Johan Cruyff was the first player to join a club in La Liga for a record fee of £922,000 (£10 million in 2025), when he moved from Ajax to Barcelona. In 1982, Barcelona again set the record by signing Diego Maradona from Boca Juniors for £5 million (£18 million in 2025). Real Betis set the world record in 1998 when they signed Denílson from São Paulo for £21.5 million (£41.7 million in 2025).

Four of the last six world transfer records have been set by Real Madrid, signing Luís Figo, Zinedine Zidane, Cristiano Ronaldo (plus a deal for Kaká days before Ronaldo which fell just below a world record due to the way the fee was calculated) and finally Gareth Bale, who was bought in 2013 for £85.3m (€103.4m or $140m at the time; £119.6m in 2025) from Tottenham Hotspur.

Brazilian forward Neymar was the subject of an expensive and complicated transfer arrangement when he joined Barcelona from Santos in 2013, and his outgoing transfer to Paris Saint-Germain in 2017 set a new world record fee at €222m via his buyout clause. Barcelona soon invested a large amount of the money received from this transfer in a replacement, Ousmane Dembélé, whose deal – €105m – was the second most expensive ever before Philippe Coutinho's transfer to Barcelona for €142m in January 2018.

== Player records ==
=== Most appearances ===
As of 22 November 2026

Boldface indicates a player still active in La Liga. Italics indicates a player still active outside La Liga.

Rank	Player	Club(s)	Years active	Apps	Goals
1	(Spain) Andoni Zubizarreta	Athletic Bilbao, Barcelona, Valencia	1981–1998	622	0
1	(Spain) Joaquín	Real Betis, Valencia, Málaga	2001–2013; 2015–2023	622	76
3	(Spain) Raúl García	Osasuna, Atlético Madrid, Athletic Bilbao	2004–2024	609	112
4	(France) Antoine Griezmann	Real Sociedad, Atlético Madrid, Barcelona	2010–2026	564	205
5	(Spain) Dani Parejo	Real Madrid, Getafe, Valencia, Villarreal	2008–2026	558	77
6	(Spain) Raúl	Real Madrid	1994–2010	550	228
7	(Spain) Eusebio Sacristán	Valladolid, Atlético Madrid, Barcelona, Celta Vigo	1983–2002	543	36
8	(Spain) Paco Buyo	Sevilla, Real Madrid	1980–1997	542	0
9	(Spain) Sergio Ramos	Sevilla, Real Madrid	2003–2021; 2023–2024	536	77
10	(Spain) **Koke**	**Atlético Madrid**	2009–	529	40

=== Most goals ===
Boldface indicates a player still active in La Liga. Italics indicates a player still active outside La Liga.

Rank	Player	Club(s)	Years active	Goals	Apps	Ratio
1	(Argentina) Lionel Messi	Barcelona	2004–2021	474	520	0.91
2	(Portugal) Cristiano Ronaldo	Real Madrid	2009–2018	311	292	1.07
3	(Spain) Telmo Zarra†	Athletic Bilbao	1940–1955	251	278	0.9
4	(France) Karim Benzema	Real Madrid	2009–2023	238	439	0.54
5	(Mexico) Hugo Sánchez	Atlético Madrid, Real Madrid, Rayo Vallecano	1981–1994	234	347	0.67
6	(Spain) Raúl	Real Madrid	1994–2010	228	550	0.41
7	(Argentina) (Spain) Alfredo Di Stéfano†	Real Madrid, Espanyol	1953–1966	227	329	0.69
8	(Spain) César Rodríguez†	Granada, Barcelona, Cultural Leonesa, Elche	1939–1955	221	353	0.63
9	(Spain) Quini†	Sporting Gijón, Barcelona	1970–1987	219	448	0.49
10	(Spain) Pahiño†	Celta Vigo, Real Madrid, Deportivo La Coruña	1943–1956	210	278	0.76

== Sponsors ==
MAIN SPONSOR: EA SPORTS (2023–2028)
Partners	Type	Partners	Type
Puma	Official ball	Microsoft	Innovation partner
Mahou	Official beer	Riyadh Season	Official partner
Duracell	Official partner of added time	BKT	Official tyre
Moeve	Official partner	Volkswagen	Official car
Uber Eats	Official delivery	Mondelez	Official flavour
Airbnb	Official accommodation booking platform	Luckia	Official betting partner
El Corte Inglés	Official retailer	Haier	Official partner
Solan de Cabras	Official water	OSHEE	Official partner
Legends	Legends experience	Panini	Global licence
Avery Dennison	Global licence	Sorare	Global licence

=== Main Sponsors ===
- Liga BBVA (2008–2016)
- LaLiga Santander (2016–2023)
- LALIGA EA Sports (2023–2028)

== See also ==
- Football in Spain – overview of football sport
- Football records and statistics in Spain
- List of attendance at sports leagues
- List of foreign La Liga players
- List of La Liga broadcasters
- List of La Liga stadiums
- List of Spanish football champions
- Liga F
