= Celtic TV =

Ownership
- Owner: Celtic F.C. Setanta Sports (TV channel)

History
- Launched: 26 July 2004 (TV channel); 2011 (Streaming Service)
- Closed: 23 June 2009 (TV channel)

Links
- Website: www.celticfc.tv

Celtic TV is a British premium streaming service devoted to coverage of the Scottish football club Celtic F.C. From 2004-2009, Celtic TV existed as a sports television channel operated by Irish Sports broadcasting company Setanta Sports.

== History ==
Launched in July 2004 alongside its Old Firm counterpart Rangers TV, Celtic TV was operated by the Irish company Setanta Sports and was available on satellite and cable platforms in the UK and Ireland. The channel only broadcast on weekdays, and did not broadcast on weekends.

The channel closed on 23 June 2009 with the rest of Setanta's networks, following the broadcaster's financial difficulties and collapse into administration in the United Kingdom. The following day, Celtic F.C. announced that the network would remain closed until a new rights holder to continue broadcasting the channel would be negotiated.

While the channel never returned on air, the club rebranded its Channel 67 online audio and video channel as Celtic TV in 2011. The current incarnation of the channel stands as the official digital streaming platform of Celtic F.C. and offers fans exclusive content, live match coverage, and in-depth features and interviews.

== See also ==
- The Celtic View, the club's official magazine
