= Rangers TV =

Ownership
- Owner: Rangers Football Club PLC; Setanta Sports (TV channel)

History
- Launched: 26 July 2004 (Channel); 30 October 2009 (Online Service)
- Closed: 23 June 2009 (Channel)

Links
- Website: rangerstv.tv

Rangers TV is a British streaming service devoted to coverage of the Scottish football club Rangers F.C. From 2004-2009, Rangers TV existed as a sports television channel operated by Irish sports broadcasting company Setanta Sports.

== History ==
Launched in July 2004 alongside Celtic TV, Rangers TV was operated by the Irish company Setanta Sports and was available on satellite and cable platforms in the UK and Ireland. The channel only broadcast on weekdays, and did not broadcast on weekends.

The channel had TV shows showing highlights and full match replays of recent games. It also replayed full games from the past. There was also Reserves action and Rangers heroes programmes. The main show while operated by Setanta was 'Ibrox Uncovered' Which was hosted by Lindsey Archibald which was a live talk show about the latest Rangers news, broadcast each weeknight. Guests featured were Derek Ferguson, Andy Goram, Arthur Numan, Alex Rae and occasionally Willie Henderson. The show also featured Fans Phone calls twice a week.

The channel closed on 23 June 2009 with the rest of Setanta's networks, following the broadcaster's financial difficulties and collapse into administration in the United Kingdom. On 25 June, Rangers announced that they would negotiate a deal with other broadcasters to relaunch Rangers TV.

On 30 October 2009, Rangers TV was re-launched as an internet subscription-based channel at rangerstv.tv. Rangers TV is now available throughout the world and broadcasts all live matches for viewers outside the UK & Republic of Ireland. Users within the British Isles can watch highlight programmes and full games after midnight of the day of the game.
