= 2009 in British television =

This is a list of events that took place in 2009 related to British television.

== Events ==
=== January ===
Date	Event
1 January	Jonathan Creek returns with a special episode, the first episode of the series since 2004.
1 January	"The Morning After", an episode of The Bill, airs on ITV1. It is a sequel to the series 20 episode "Dawn Morning Light".
1 January	The Krypton Factor returns to ITV after a 14-year hiatus. Ben Shephard is chosen as the new host taking over from Gordon Burns who has originally hosted from 1977 to 1995 although the 1995 edition was co-hosted by Penny Smith.
2 January	BBC 2W closes as part of plans to achieve 3% savings at BBC Cymru Wales. Consequently, the digital version becomes a simulcast of BBC Two on analogue with fewer Wales opt-outs.
2 January	Celebrity Big Brother returns to Channel 4 for the first time since 2007, following the racism controversy that dominated that year's show. Participants include La Toya Jackson, Verne Troyer and Ulrika Jonsson.
3 January	The BBC announce that 26-year-old Matt Smith is to replace David Tennant as The Doctor in sci-fi drama Doctor Who. Smith, who will take over in 2010, will be the youngest ever actor to play the title role.
12 January	Jeff Stelling and Rachel Riley host Countdown for the first time.
14 January	Launch of the BBC's Persian language news channel.
20 January	BBC One airs live coverage of the inauguration of Barack Obama as the 44th President of the United States.
22 January	The Disasters Emergency Committee launches its Gaza Crisis Appeal following the recent conflict in the region. The BBC causes controversy by saying it will not be broadcasting the appeal as it would compromise its impartiality. Sky News join the BBC in deciding not to air the appeal, but it is screened by ITV, Channel 4 and Channel 5 on 26 January.
23 January	Friday Night with Jonathan Ross returns after host Jonathan Ross finishes his 12-week suspension following his role in The Russell Brand Show prank telephone calls row.
23 January	Ulrika Jonsson wins the sixth series of Celebrity Big Brother.
26 January	UKTV Documentary is rebranded as "Eden".
27 January	ITV confirms that five cast and crew from Heartbeat were injured in a tractor accident while filming on location in Grosmont, North Yorkshire.
31 January	Singer Jade Ewen is selected as the United Kingdom's entrant to the 2009 Eurovision Song Contest in the final episode of the BBC's selection programme Eurovision: Your Country Needs You. Ewen will sing 'It's My Time', by Andrew Lloyd Webber, a song written specially for the contest.

=== February ===
Date	Event
2 February	A day of extreme snow in parts of Britain, the biggest in 18 years, causes many TV programmes to broadcast with limited presenters and live audience shortages as people are unable to reach the studios. In ratings terms, news coverage gets very high ratings with over seven million watching BBC News programmes.
4 February	Carol Thatcher is axed from The One Show after she referred to a tennis player as a "golliwog" during a backstage conversation while filming for the programme.
4 February	A technical playout error during ITV1's coverage of the FA Cup Fourth Round replay between Everton and Liverpool results in coverage of the match being interrupted by an advertisement break towards the end of extra time, causing viewers to miss seeing Everton's winning goal as the feed is restored straight afterwards. ITV subsequently apologises for the error.
5 February	To coincide with the 20th anniversary of Sky's launch, at 6am Sunrise begins presenting from a new "multi-purpose" area of the Sky News Centre, formally known as the "shoebox".
7 February	BBC Two screens the first part of Iran and the West, a landmark three-part documentary marking the 30th anniversary of the Iranian Revolution.
9 February	ITV plc merges the ITV Thames Valley and ITV Meridian regions.
10 February	George McGhee announces he is stepping down as BBC Controller of Programme Acquisition after six years, and will take a career break. His role will be temporarily filled by Sue Deeks, the current Programme Acquisition Head of Series.
10 February	ITV airs an hour-long episode of Emmerdale showing the funeral of long-standing character Jack Sugden, who was killed off-screen due to the death of Clive Hornby, the actor who played him, the year before. The episode sees Sheila Mercier reprise her role as Jack's mother, Annie Sugden, who returns to the village of Emmerdale to attend his funeral, while the episode is dedicated to Hornby's memory.
12 February	ITV plc merges the ITV Anglia regions.
16 February	Five US is rebranded as Five USA. Also on this day, ITV plc merges the ITV West and ITV Westcountry regions.
17 February	UKTV People is rebranded as "Blighty".
19 February	ITV plc merges the ITV Yorkshire regions.
23 February	ITV plc merges the ITV Central regions.
23 February	Sky is criticised by Ofcom for allowing Domino's Pizza to sponsor The Simpsons because the deal breached the watchdog's rules banning the advertising of junk food while children's programmes are on air.
23 February	Corpus Christi College, Oxford wins the 2008–09 series of University Challenge, beating the University of Manchester 275–190. Corpis Christi are later disqualified after one of their team members is found to have no longer been a student, and the title awarded to Manchester.
24 February	An episode of EastEnders is screened consisting entirely of black actors, the first time an episode of the soap has featured an entirely black cast in its 23-year history.
25 February	ITV plc merges the ITV Border and ITV Tyne Tees regions.
26 February	Mat Follas wins the 2009 series of MasterChef.
February	ITV makes major cutbacks to its regional broadcasts in England. The separate sub-regional news programmes are merged into a pan-regional programme although more localised news continues to be broadcast as a brief opt-out during the early evening programme, and with the exception of a monthly political programme, all non-news regional programming in the English regions ends.
February	UTV's mid-morning weekday and lunchtime weekend UTV Live bulletins are axed when the station is permitted to reduce their weekly news output from five hours and twenty minutes to four hours.

=== March ===
Date	Event
2 March	UKTV History is rebranded as "Yesterday".
2 March	Corpus Christi College, Oxford are disqualified as champions of the 2009 series of University Challenge after one of their contestants, Sam Kay, was found to no longer be a student. The runners-up, the University of Manchester, are declared champions in their place.
2 March	ITV announces it is cutting 600 jobs after it reported a loss of £2.6 billion for 2008. The jobs will go from the company's Yorkshire studios in Leeds and from their headquarters in London.
2 March	Emmerdale announces the introduction of British soap's first regular blind character. Kitty McGeever will make her debut as wayward character Lizzie Lakely next month.
9 March	From this week, ITV's News at Ten programme returns to being aired five nights a week (having previously aired Monday to Thursday only since its return, with an 11 pm bulletin on Fridays).
13 March	Highlights of Comic Relief 2009 include a spoof of Mamma Mia, and a re-imagining of The Office as an opera. The telethon raises a record total in excess of £57 million at the climax of their telethon, surpassing the amount raised during the 2007 telethon by over £17 million.
16 March	Missing was broadcast as the first British Daytime serial on the BBC since Doctors since 2000.
22 March	Ray Quinn and dance partner Maria Filippov win the fourth series of Dancing on Ice.
23 March	STV relaunches its on-screen presentation.
23 March	Scotland Today is relaunched as STV News at Six.
25 March	ITV announces that it will postpone the broadcast of the 2009 National Television Awards until January 2010, and will axe the National Movie Awards.
25 March	Fern Britton announces she is to quit This Morning after 10 years.

=== April ===
Date	Event
1 April	Six TV is defunct in Oxfordshire and Southampton after only 10 years of localised airing.
1 April	Trouble closes down after over 12 years of broadcasting and is replaced by Living +2.
1 April	Channel 4 airs the 1,000th edition of Deal or No Deal.
3 April	The BBC is fined £150,000 because of The Russell Brand Show prank telephone calls row. It is the biggest financial penalty ever imposed on the corporation for a single broadcast.
4 April	The BBC receives 1,477 complaints following a remark made by sports presenter Clare Balding to the winning jockey at the 2009 Grand National. Referring to Liam Treadwell's teeth she suggested that he could "get them done" with his prize fund. Balding and the BBC later issued an apology.
5 April	BBC One moves its Countryfile programme to a 7 pm slot on Sunday evenings. The Sunday morning slot previously occupied by the show is taken over by a new outdoors activity show called Country Tracks.
6 April	Paramount Comedy 1 and Paramount Comedy 2 are rebranded to Comedy Central and Comedy Central Extra.
7 April	BBC Two suffers its second worse peaktime viewing audience since 2001, with a share of 5.3%.
7 April	The BBC confirms that Danniella Westbrook will return to EastEnders as Sam Mitchell later in the year.
8 April	The BBC apologises after a link was accidentally posted on The Apprentice website revealing the identity of the candidate who would be fired in the evening's edition of the show.
8 April – 9 September	Analogue services are switched off in the Westcountry region.
10 April	Channel 5 broadcasts Australian live action children's series Hi-5 on their Milkshake! block for the final time after 6 years due to losing rights and constant presenter changes.
10–12 April	To celebrate its 21st birthday, three new episodes of the sci-fi sitcom Red Dwarf are broadcast on Dave. Entitled Red Dwarf: Back to Earth, they are the first new episodes of the show since 1999.
11 April	Unemployed 47 year old Susan Boyle makes her Britain's Got Talent audition, performing "I Dreamed A Dream" out of the blue; her audition gains many YouTube views overnight.
23 April	ITV chief executive Michael Grade announces he will step down by the end of 2009 and will become non-executive chairman.
25 April	Simon Amstell announces that he is to quit as host of Never Mind the Buzzcocks after acting as host since 2006.
27 April	UTV launches a 30-minute late evening news and current affairs programme, UTV Live Tonight, which follows the News at Ten on weekday nights from Monday to Thursday. The programme incorporates the station's late news bulletin alongside extended political and business coverage.
30 April	UKTV Style is rebranded as "Home".

=== May ===
Date	Event
6 May	After five Gurkha veterans who had applied for UK residency receive letters telling them their appeals have been rejected, the actress Joanna Lumley, who is the face of the Gurkha Justice Campaign, confronted the Minister for Immigration Phil Woolas at the BBC Westminster studios about the issue. After she pursues him around the studio, the pair hold an impromptu press conference in which she pressures him into agreeing to further talks over the issue.
6 May	ITV announces that The South Bank Show is to end in 2010 after 32 years following Melvyn Bragg's retirement.
8 May	It is announced that Richard and Judy's series on Watch, Richard and Judy's New Position, will end early due to poor ratings. The show launched in October 2008 with 100,000 viewers, but audiences have dropped as low as 8,000. The last episode will air on 3 July.
12 May	BBC News Channel presenter Carrie Gracie discloses details of her annual salary during a heated debate on the MPs expenses row with Lord Faulks. The revelation breaks with the BBC's protocol of not divulging how much individual members of staff are paid.
15 May	Three actors have been axed from Coronation Street, it is reported. Jonathan Dixon (Darryl Morton), Nikki Patel (Amber Kalirai) and Wanda Opalinska (Wiki Dankowska) will be leaving later in the year.
16 May	The 2009 Eurovision Song Contest is held in Moscow, Russia, and sees Graham Norton taking on the role of presenter of the BBC's coverage following Terry Wogan's decision to step down in 2008. The contest is the first to have the result decided by a combination of panels of experts and televoting in order to reduce instances of countries voting for their neighbours. It is won by Norway's Alexander Rybak with "Fairytale".
17 May	Actress Leslie Ash is to join the cast of Holby City as executive Vanessa Lytton, it is announced. The role sees her return to television five years after she contracted a hospital bug that left her partially paralysed. She will begin shooting her scenes in June and be seen on screen from October.
18 May	Portland TV is fined £27,500 by Ofcom for a programme broadcast by adult channel Television X2 in September 2008 that the watchdog deemed showed material equivalent to BBFC R18 content.
19 May	UKTV Gardens is replaced by Really.
20 May	David Tennant finishes filming his tenure of Doctor Who as the Tenth Doctor.
25 May	The Coach Trip returns to Channel 4 after 3 years of absence.
27 May	Having originally planned to leave the series at the end of the year, Gray O'Brien, who plays Tony Gordon in Coronation Street has extended his contract. He will take a break to appear in pantomime before returning to film a dramatic exit storyline.
28 May	EastEnders is to feature a storyline in which a male Muslim character has a gay relationship, it is reported. Syed Masood (Marc Elliott) will also be seen sharing an on screen kiss with Christian Clarke (John Partridge) after falling for him.
28 May	BBC One airs Tourettes: I Swear I Can't Help It, a follow-up documentary to the 1989 Q.E.D. film John's Not Mad, dealing with people who have Tourette syndrome.
30 May	Street dance troupe Diversity win the third series of Britain's Got Talent, beating bookies favourite Susan Boyle into second place.

=== June ===
Date	Event
5 June	Ben Bradshaw is appointed as Culture Secretary following a Cabinet reshuffle, while Sir Alan Sugar is to sit in the House of Lords as the Government's Enterprise Tsar. The appointment leads to conflict of interest concerns because of Sugar's role on The Apprentice, with Bradshaw's shadow, Jeremy Hunt raising the matter in the House of Commons on 8 June. Bradshaw does not believe there will be a problem as Sugar's BBC role is a non-political one.
7 June	Yasmina Siadatan wins the fifth series of The Apprentice.
12 June	It is announced that Peter Sissons, who is thought to be Britain's longest serving newsreader, will retire in the summer after 45 years.
15 June	ITV announces that it has axed the science fiction drama Primeval to concentrate on producing post-watershed drama. However, plans for two more series were revealed in September after ITV agreed a deal with UKTV.
16 June	The long-awaited Digital Britain report is published. It makes a number of recommendations with regard to Broadband access, Internet use and Public Service Broadcasting.
18 June	Analogue services in the Caldbeck, Cumbria, Dumfries & Galloway and the Isle of Man are switched off.
18 June	The BBC confirms that Sir Alan Sugar will keep his role with The Apprentice as it feels his role as Enterprise Tsar will not compromise the broadcaster's impartiality.
19 June	After nearly 27 years, Countdown is filmed at The Leeds Studios for the last time. Subsequent series were filmed at Granada Studios in Manchester until 2013 when it switched to filming in dock10, MediaCityUK in Salford.
19 June	EastEnders begins airing a storyline in which Muslim character Syed Masood (Marc Elliott) begins a homosexual relationship with Christian Clarke (John Partridge).
22 June	UKTV Food is rebranded as "Good Food". rebrands.
23 June	Setanta Sports ceases broadcasting in the UK after going into administration.
25 June	The BBC publishes the expenses of some of its top executives. Among the information to be revealed is that the corporation's Director General Mark Thompson claimed over £2,000 after cutting short his holiday in October 2008 to deal with the row over The Russell Brand Show phone calls controversy.
25 June	Channel 4 feigns a power failure during the broadcast of an episode of TNT, starring Jack Whitehall and Holly Walsh, after a joke is made at the expense of Michael Jackson. At the time of broadcast, reports of Jackson's death were beginning to come through, so there had been no time to re-scrutinize any of the programming. Due to the time delay employed by many broadcasters, Channel 4 were able to, perhaps quite literally, pull the plug before the now-tasteless joke went public.

=== July ===
Date	Event
5 July	Reece Dinsdale, who plays Joe McIntyre in Coronation Street, has quit the soap because he did not wish to be typecast, the News of the World reports.
6 July	Mecia Simson wins Cycle 5 of Britain's Next Top Model.
7 July	A memorial service for the singer Michael Jackson, who died on 25 June, is broadcast live on BBC Two and on Five.
9 July	It is announced that Alesha Dixon will replace Arlene Phillips as one of the judges when Strictly Come Dancing returns for its seventh series later in the year.
10 July	Jayne Middlemiss wins the 2009 series of Celebrity MasterChef.
14 July	BBC Trust chairman Sir Michael Lyons announces that bonuses for the 10 most senior BBC executives will be suspended indefinitely.
16 July	ITV repeats Martin Bashir's 2003 documentary Living with Michael Jackson. The programme draws 3.64m viewers (a 15.4% share of the audience).
16 July	ITV announces that its news and information Teletext service will be discontinued within the next six months as a result of mounting losses and the inability to find a viable business model to continue.
17 July	Fern Britton presents her last edition of This Morning after 10 years.
17 July	It is announced that Teletext games magazine GameCentral will cease broadcasting in December, along with all other Teletext editorial content.
22 July	The Caldbeck group of transmitters have their final analogue signals turned off, completing the digital switchover of the Border Television region.
23 July	ITV moves Coronation Street from its long-standing Wednesday evening slot to Thursday at 8:30. There is also a second episode of Emmerdale replacing the Tuesday hour long episode, which reverts to 30 minutes. The Bill is also moved to a post-9pm slot to allow for more hard-hitting storylines until its permanent cancellation on 31 August 2010. The changes are part of an overhaul of ITV's scheduling to make way for football coverage on Wednesdays.
28 July	TV presenter Esther Rantzen confirms that she will run for Parliament in the Luton South constituency at the next general election.
July	STV announces that it is withdrawing more ITV programmes from its schedules, such as The Bill, Doc Martin, Midsomer Murders, Poirot, Lewis, instead preferring to concentrate on programming made within Scotland.

=== August ===
Date	Event
3 August	ESPN UK Launches in place of Setanta Sports
5 August	Channel 4 announces that it will axe its lunchtime news bulletin as part of a cost-cutting exercise as from December. The 8:00 pm More4 bulletin will also be scrapped.
6 August	ITV sells its stake in the Friends Reunited website for £25m, having paid £125m for it in 2005. The sale occurs as the company announces losses of £105m in the first half of 2009 and a record decline in advertising revenue.
12 August	Analogue services are switched off in the HTV Wales region.
26 August	Channel 4 announces that Big Brother will end in 2010 after series 11.
27 August	Mass production of televisions in the UK comes to an end after the last set rolls off the production line at Toshiba's plant in Plymouth.
28 August	At the Edinburgh International Television Festival News Corporation Chairman James Murdoch delivers the MacTaggart Memorial Lecture in which he launches an attack on the BBC and UK media regulator Ofcom.
31 August	Jetix rebrands as Disney XD after the full purchase of Jetix Europe by The Walt Disney Company.

=== September ===
Date	Event
4 September	Sophie Reade wins series ten of Big Brother.
9 September	Westcountry Television completes the digital switchover process with the turning off of all analogue signals from the Caradon Hill transmitter
19 September	British television premiere of the James Bond film Casino Royale on ITV1.
20 September	Jimmy Mulville, the head of Hat Trick Productions, announced that a pilot for an American version of the long-running satirical panel game Have I Got News for You was to be made.
21 September	A week after Danniella Westbrook's return to EastEnders, a spokesman for the soap confirms she will be leaving the series again at the end of the year, her character, Sam Mitchell, having been brought back for a few months as part of a specific storyline.
22 September	ITV plc launches legal proceedings against STV (its Channel 3 counterpart in Scotland) for a quoted unpaid debt of £38 million from network programming contributions, following STV's practice of dropping a number of network programmes on the STV franchise. At the same time, STV claims it is also following procedures against ITV plc, for up to £40 million owed to STV under its advertising sales agreements.
29 September	ITV announces that it has struck a deal between Watch, Impossible Pictures, German broadcaster Pro7 and BBC Worldwide to produce two new series of Primeval for transmission in 2011.
30 September	The Freeview service is upgraded requiring 18 million households to retune their television sets. The changes lead to several hundred complaints from people who have lost channels as a result of retuning their equipment.

=== October ===
Date	Event
1 October	London mayor Boris Johnson makes a cameo appearance in BBC One soap EastEnders. The episode is watched by 8 million viewers.
2 October	Mock the Week announces that two new series are being made, but Frankie Boyle will no longer appear on the show.
2 October	Channel TV is fined £80,000 by Ofcom over their part in the television phone-in scandal involving the British Comedy Awards.
10 October	It is confirmed that Red Dwarf will be commissioned a full series following the success of Red Dwarf: Back to Earth. It will be recorded in 2010 for Dave.
11 October	It is announced that there are plans to adapt the Douglas Adams Dirk Gently novels for television.
12 October	Following its direct-to-DVD special, Hero of the Rails, children's TV show, Thomas & Friends transforms into full CGI animation instead of the usual toy models that were used from 1984 to 2008.
13 October	Teletext Ltd confirms that GameCentral will continue as a website and mobile service after it is dropped from the television service in December.
14 October	Andrew Newman, head of entertainment and comedy at Channel 4 leaves his job to go to work for Objective Productions after working for the TV channel for over 10 years.
19 October	Alison King makes her return to Coronation Street as Carla Connor.
22 October	British National Party leader Nick Griffin makes a controversial first appearance on Question Time after being invited onto the show by the BBC. The edition attracts eight million viewers, twice the programme's usual audience. The programme also results in a large number of complaints to the BBC, while Griffin himself makes a formal complaint to the corporation for the way he believes he was treated on the show.
22 October	Steve Groves wins the second series of BBC Two's MasterChef: The Professionals.
22 October	ITV announces plans to drop the clock face of Big Ben from the opening credits of News at Ten. Also confirmed are plans to relaunch the Tonight programme in January 2010 with Julie Etchingham as its new presenter.
26 October	The second and final series of Numberjacks begins on CBeebies.
28 October	It is announced by the BBC that Barbara Windsor is to leave EastEnders in 2010 after 16 years.

=== November ===
Date	Event
4 November	Analogue BBC2 switched off in the Granada Television region.
5 November	Graham Cole makes his final appearance as Tony Stamp in The Bill.
10 November	The BBC confirms that the next series of The Apprentice will be delayed from Spring 2010 to avoid clashing with the general election.
18 November	Former Asda chief executive Archie Norman is appointed as chairman of ITV from January 2010.
20 November	The Peter Kay's All Star Animated Band music video made its debut on that year's Children in Need, featuring over 50 children's TV characters past and present. It took 2 years to create the finished result.
21 November	Athlete Jade Johnson pulled out of Strictly Come Dancing due to a knee injury she suffered in the previous week's dress rehearsal where she was given a bye to that night and chose to withdraw.
24 November	Virgin Media enters into a strategic partnership with TiVo. Consequently, Virgin Media will be the exclusive distributor of TiVo services and technology in the United Kingdom.
24 November	UK airdate of the Ugly Betty episode "In the Stars" which features a cameo appearance from English singer Adele. The episode airs on E4 first, before being shown on Channel 4 on 30 November.
26 November	ITV takes full ownership of the breakfast TV service GMTV after purchasing Disney's 25% share in the channel.

=== December ===
Date	Event
2 December	The Winter Hill transmitter has its remaining analogue signals turned off, completing the digital switchover process in the Granada Television region. Freeview HD begins transmission marking the worldwide operational debut of the DVB-T2 standard.
4 December	TV chef Gino D'Acampo wins the ninth series of I'm a Celebrity...Get Me Out of Here!. It is later reported that D'Acampo and fellow contestant Stuart Manning will face criminal charges after they captured, killed and cooked a rat, while ITV apologises for the incident and says it will tighten up security on the show. Charges against the pair, who turned to the rodent as a source of food to give themselves more protein after being put on reduced rations of rice and beans, are later dropped because production staff gave them permission to eat it. In February 2010, ITV are fined A$3,000 over the incident by a Court in New South Wales.
8 December	Actor Mark Eden, who played Coronation Street villain Alan Bradley returns to Blackpool to unveil a plaque marking the 20th anniversary of the character's demise. Alan was killed off on 8 December 1989 in a storyline that saw him being hit by a Blackpool tram outside the town's The Strand Hotel.
11 December	CBeebies airs the last ever episode of Numberjacks.
13 December	BBC One airs an interview Fern Britton recorded with Tony Blair as part of her Fern Britton Meets... series. During the programme, the former Prime Minister says that it would have been right to remove Iraqi president Saddam Hussein even without evidence he had weapons of mass destruction.
13 December	Footballer Ryan Giggs is named this year's BBC Sports Personality of the Year.
13 December	Joe McElderry wins the sixth series of The X Factor.
16 December	ITV closes its news and information service on Teletext, leaving the ITV channel(s) without such a service for the first time in 35 years.
19 December	BBC sports presenter Chris Hollins and his dancing partner Ola Jordan win the seventh series of Strictly Come Dancing.
23 December	Singer Boy George loses a High Court battle to overturn a ruling by the Probation Service that he could not appear on the final series of Celebrity Big Brother.
25 December	The Royle Family returns for another Christmas special, attracting an audience of 10.2 million. The most watched show of the day is EastEnders, which overnight figures suggest is seen by 10.9 million.
26 December	BBC Two airs a television film adaptation of Hamlet, starring David Tennant in the eponymous role.

== Debuts ==
=== BBC ===
Date	Debut	Channel
2 January	The Legend of Dick and Dom	CBBC
2 January	Around the World in 80 Faiths	BBC Two
3 January	A History of Scotland	BBC Two
3 January	Richard Hammond's Blast Lab	CBBC
3 January	Eurovision: Your Country Needs You	BBC One
3 January	Total Wipeout	BBC One
5 January	Half Moon Investigations	BBC One
5 January	The Diary of Anne Frank	BBC One
5 January	Scoop	CBBC
6 January	Paradise Cafe	CBBC
6 January	Grow Your Own Drugs	BBC Two
6 January	Oz and James Drink to Britain	BBC Two
8 January	Life of Riley	BBC One
8 January	Victorian Farm	BBC Two
9 January	The Oracle with Max Keiser	BBC World News
12 January	Million Dollar Traders	BBC Two
14 January	The City Uncovered	BBC Two
14 January	The Secret Life of Elephants	BBC One
15 January	Undercover Princes	BBC Three
18 January	Hunter	BBC One
20 January	Cowards	BBC Four
23 January	LifeSpam	BBC Three
25 January	Being Human	BBC Three
27 January	Naked	BBC Three
30 January	The Site	
31 January	The Old Guys	BBC One
1 February	Charles Darwin and the Tree of Life	BBC One & BBC Two
2 February	Moses Jones	BBC Two
7 February	Iran and the West	BBC Two
8 February	Victorian Farm	BBC Two
10 February	Grandpa in My Pocket	CBeebies
11 February	Nature's Great Events	BBC One
12 February	We Need Answers	BBC Four
14 February	The Bottom Line	BBC News
15 February	The Victorians	BBC One
19 February	Britain's Best Drives	BBC Four
26 February	Margaret	BBC Two
6 March	Rocket Science	BBC One
12 March	I've Never Seen Star Wars	BBC Four
12 March	Baroque! From St Peter's to St Paul's	BBC Four
14 March	The Lost World of Communism	BBC Two
15 March	Yellowstone	BBC Two
16 March	Missing	BBC One
16 March	A Question of Genius	BBC Two
16 March	Stewart Lee's Comedy Vehicle	BBC Two
20 March	Genius	BBC Two
27 March	The Real Swiss Family Robinson	BBC One
31 March	All the Small Things	
5 April	Five Minutes of Heaven	BBC Two
6 April	Timmy Time	Cbeebies
7 April	The Speaker	BBC Two
16 April	Horrible Histories	CBBC
18 April	Winging It	BBC Two
18 April	Tonight's the Night	BBC One
24 April	Reggie Perrin	BBC One
26 April	Best: His Mother's Son	BBC Two
4 May	Martha Speaks	CBBC
10 May	South Pacific	BBC Two
10 May	The Incredible Human Journey	BBC Two
11 May	Propertywatch	BBC Two
11 May	Waybuloo	CBeebies
16 May	Transmission Impossible with Ed & Oucho	CBBC
18 May	Moving On	BBC One
31 May	Empire of Cricket	BBC Two
2 June	Mary Queen of Charity Shops	BBC Two
6 June	Michael McIntyre's Comedy Roadshow	BBC One
6 June	Totally Saturday	BBC One
7 June	Hope Springs	BBC One
16 June	Occupation	BBC One
16 June	Personal Affairs	BBC Three
18 June	Psychoville	BBC Two
8 July	Taking the Flak	BBC Two
8 July	Getting On	BBC Four
13 July	League of Super Evil	CBBC
14 July	Freefall	BBC Two
17 July	As Seen on TV	BBC One
18 July	How to Be a Composer	BBC Four
19 July	Young, Dumb and Living Off Mum	BBC Three
21 July	The Truth About Crime	BBC One
21 July	Desperate Romantics	BBC Two
23 July	The Rat Pack	BBC One
27 July	Bang Goes the Theory	BBC One
27 July	Knowitalls	BBC Two
29 July	Breaking the Mould	BBC Four
30 July	We Are Klang	BBC Three
30 July	My Life as an Animal	BBC Three
5 August	Roy	CBBC
6 August	The Funny Side Of...	BBC Two
8 August	The Football League Show	BBC One
15 August	Walk on the Wild Side	BBC One
20 August	Tough Guy or Chicken?	BBC Three
24 August	Pointless	BBC Two
4 September	Happy Hollidays	BBC One
5 September	My Almost Famous Family	CBBC
6 September	Last Chance to See	BBC Two
7 September	Dennis & Gnasher	CBBC
7 September	Gigglebiz	CBeebies
7 September	Land Girls	BBC One
8 September	Lost Land of the Volcano	BBC One
9 September	Crash	BBC One
10 September	Off the Hook	BBC Three
10 September	Lunch Monkeys	BBC Three
14 September	Home Time	BBC Two
14 September	The Cut	BBC Two
19 September	Merlin: Secrets and Magic	BBC Three
27 September	By Any Means 2	BBC Two
29 September	Electric Dreams	BBC Four
4 October	Emma	BBC One
6 October	It's Only a Theory	BBC Four
8 October	Micro Men	BBC Four
10 October	The Well	BBC Two
12 October	Life	BBC One
13 October	Around the World in 80 Days	BBC One
13 October	Inside Life	CBBC
21 October	Gary: Tank Commander	BBC Two
21 October	Defying Gravity	BBC Two
22 October	Russell Howard's Good News	BBC Three
28 October	Andrew Marr's The Making of Modern Britain	BBC Two
31 October	The Impressions Show with Culshaw and Stephenson	BBC One
1 November	Garrow's Law	BBC One
2 November	Into the Storm	BBC Two
9 November	Miranda	BBC Two
16 November	Enid	BBC Four
23 November	Mouth to Mouth	BBC Three
23 November	Paradox	BBC One
29 November	Fern Britton Meets...	BBC One
30 November	Rip Off Britain	BBC One
30 November	Margot	BBC Four
2 December	Big Top	BBC One
14 December	Move Like Michael Jackson	BBC Three
20 December	Return to Cranford	BBC One
23 December	Victoria Wood's Mid Life Christmas	BBC One
28 December	The Day of the Triffids	BBC One
30 December	The Turn of the Screw	BBC One

=== ITV ===
Date	Debut	Channel
3 January	Demons	ITV
4 January	Above Suspicion	ITV
29 January	Paris Hilton's British Best Friend	ITV2
31 January	The Feelgood Factor	ITV
31 January	Good Arrows	ITV4
2 February	Whitechapel	ITV
3 February	Ladies of Letters	ITV3
21 February	The Colour of Money	ITV
22 February	Piers Morgan's Life Stories	ITV
23 February	Law & Order: UK	ITV
25 February	FM	ITV2
27 February	Al Murray's Multiple Personality Disorder	ITV
2 March	Bookaboo	CITV
16 March	Taste the Nation	ITV
19 March	The Justin Lee Collins Show	ITV2
1 May	Boy Meets Girl	ITV
4 May	Compulsion	ITV
18 May	Divided	ITV
26 May	The Hour	ITV
30 May	Mumbai Calling	ITV
29 June	The Chase	ITV
12 July	Monday Monday	ITV
13 July	The Fuse	ITV
23 July	Made in Scotland	STV
26 July	Whatever It Takes	ITV
17 August	Peter Andre: Going It Alone	ITV2
22 August	The Cube	ITV
27 August	What Katie Did Next	ITV2
30 August	Wuthering Heights	ITV
20 September	Trinity	ITV2
19 October	Murderland	ITV
9 November	Collision	ITV
11 December	Mister Eleven	ITV
20 December	The Fattest Man in Britain	ITV
31 December	Sleep with Me	ITV

=== Channel 4 ===
Date	Debut	Channel
13 February	Free Agents	Channel 4
5 March	Red Riding	Channel 4
22 March	Chris Moyles' Quiz Night	Channel 4
6 April	Henry VIII: The Mind of a Tyrant	Channel 4
4 May	Endgame	Channel 4
11 May	Find Me a Family	Channel 4
17 May	The Unloved	Channel 4
25 May	The Operation: Surgery Live	Channel 4
7 July	You Have Been Watching	Channel 4
17 July	True Blood	Channel 4
9 September	Derren Brown: The Events	Channel 4
30 September	Ruth Watson's Hotel Rescue	Channel 4
7 October	When Boris Met Dave	More4
6 November	Campus	Channel 4
9 November	The Execution of Gary Glitter	Channel 4
12 November	Misfits	E4
13 November	PhoneShop	Channel 4
24 November	Cast Offs	Channel 4
27 November	The Increasingly Poor Decisions of Todd Margaret	Channel 4
29 November	The Queen	Channel 4

=== Five ===
Date	Debut	Channel
23 March	Wordplay	Five
6 April	Ben & Holly's Little Kingdom	Five
7 August	You're Nicked!	Five
7 September	Joshua Jones	Five
Disney		Five
14 September	Live from Studio Five	Five
5 September	Angelina Ballerina: The Next Steps	
28 October	Britain's Best Brain	

=== Other channels ===
Date	Debut	Channel
5 February	No Signal!	FX
16 February	Oops TV	Sky 1
9 March	Toyboize	Dave
12 April	Skellig	Sky 1
12 April	Olivia Lee: Dirty, Sexy, Funny	Comedy Central
10 May	Fawlty Towers: Re-Opened	G.O.L.D.
31 May	The Take	Sky 1
6 July	Four Weddings	Living
7 September	Blues and Twos	Really
7 September	999	Really
7 September	Rescue Heroes	Really
7 September	Raw Blues	Really
7 September	The Rockford Files	Alibi
7 September	Chopper Coppers	Really
7 September	Ambulance	Really
28 September	Jungle Junction	Playhouse Disney
1 October	Industrial Junkie	Quest
4 October	Tarrant Lets the Kids Loose	Watch
21 October	Grouchy Young Men	Comedy Central
25 October	Nanoboy	Pop
Undated	Bunny Maloney	Kix
Undated	Clang Invasion	Pop
Undated	Magi-Nation	Pop
Undated	Toopy and Binoo	Tiny Pop
Undated	Lab Rats Challenge	Pop
Undated	SamSam	Pop
Undated	G2G	Pop Girl

== Channels ==
=== New channels ===
Date	Channel
20 January	Investigation Discovery
5 February	Living2 +1
16 February	ITV West Country
25 February	ITV Tyne Tees & Border
20 March	Discovery Shed
19 May	Really
1 July	Wedding TV Asia
1 August	Nicktoons Replay
3 August	ESPN
3 August	ESPN HD
3 August	True Entertainment
30 September	Quest
26 October	Viva
16 November	CBS Action
16 November	CBS Drama
16 November	CBS Reality
14 December	E4 HD

=== Defunct channels ===
Date	Channel
2 January	BBC 2W
5 February	Trouble +1
8 February	ITV Thames Valley
15 February	Westcountry Television
25 February	Border Television
1 April	Six TV (Oxford & Southampton)
1 April	Trouble
1 April	Real Estate TV
19 May	UKTV Gardens
15 June	Simply Movies
23 June	Setanta Sports News
23 June	Setanta Golf
23 June	Rangers TV
23 June	Celtic TV
31 July	Nicktoonsters
3 August	Showcase TV
7 August	Arsenal TV
26 October	TMF
16 November	Zone Reality
16 November	Zone Romantica
16 November	Zone Thriller

=== Rebranded channels ===
Date	Old Name	New Name
26 January	UKTV Documentary	Eden
	UKTV Documentary +1	Eden +1
16 February	Five US	Five USA
	Five US +1	Five USA +1
17 February	UKTV People	Blighty
24 February	Dave +1	Dave ja vu
2 March	UKTV History	Yesterday
	UKTV History +1	Yesterday +1
16 March	Channel U	Channel AKA
	Fizz	Starz TV
6 April	Paramount Comedy 1	Comedy Central
	Paramount Comedy 2	Comedy Central Extra
30 April	UKTV Style	Home
	UKTV Style +1	Home +1
22 June	UKTV Food	Good Food
	UKTV Food +1	Good Food +1
1 July	MTV One	MTV
	MTV One +1	MTV +1
31 August	Jetix	Disney XD
	Jetix +1	Disney XD +1
30 November	Living2	Livingit
	Living2 +1	Livingit +1

== Television shows ==
=== Changes of network affiliation ===
Programme	Moved from	Moved to
Harry & Paul	BBC One	BBC Two
The Thick of It	BBC Four	BBC Two
Fun House	ITV1	Challenge
Formula One	ITV1	BBC One
Gavin & Stacey	BBC Three	BBC One
The Graham Norton Show	BBC Two	BBC One
Torchwood	BBC Two	BBC One
Masterchef	BBC Two	BBC One
Out of the Blue	BBC Two	Fiver
The Biggest Loser	Living	ITV1
Classic EastEnders	UKTV Gold	Watch
Hi-5	Channel 5 & Cartoonito (Australian version)	Cartoonito & CITV (UK version)
House	Five	Sky1
Blues and Twos	Bravo	Really
Fireman Sam	Five	CITV
King of the Hill	Channel 4 & Sky1	E4

=== Returning this year after a break of one year or longer ===
Programme	Date(s) of original removal	Original channel	Date of return	New channel(s)
The Krypton Factor	20 November 1995	ITV	1 January 2009	N/A (Same channel as original)
Minder	10 March 1994	ITV	4 February 2009	Five
Grand Prix Highlights	13 October 1996	BBC One; BBC Two	27 March 2009	BBC Three
Red Dwarf	5 April 1999	BBC Two	10 April 2009	Dave
The Biggest Loser	27 December 2006	Living	27 April 2009	ITV
Blues and Twos	22 November 1993	ITV	7 September 2009	Really
Born to Be Different	2004; 13 September 2007	Channel 4	28 April 2009	N/A (Same channel as original)
The Chart Show	22 August 1998	ITV	10 May 2009	Channel 4
Coach Trip	30 June 2006	Channel 4	25 May 2009	N/A (Same channel as original)
Shooting Stars new series	15 December 2002	BBC Choice	26 August 2009	BBC Two

== Continuing television shows ==
=== 1920s ===
Programme	Date
BBC Wimbledon	1927–1939, 1946–2019, 2021–present

=== 1930s ===
Programme	Date
Trooping the Colour	1937–1939, 1946–2019, 2023–present
The Boat Race	1938–1939, 1946–2019, 2021–present

=== 1950s ===
Programme	Date
Panorama	1953–present
The Sky at Night	1957–present
Blue Peter	1958–present

=== 1960s ===
Programme	Date
Coronation Street	1960–present
Songs of Praise	1961–present
University Challenge	1962–1987, 1994–present
Doctor Who	1963–1989, 1996, 2005–present
Match of the Day	1964–present
The Money Programme	1966–2010

=== 1970s ===
Programme	Date
Emmerdale	1972–present
Mastermind	1972–present
Newsround	1972–present
Last of the Summer Wine	1973–2010
Arena	1975–present
One Man and His Dog	1976–present
The Krypton Factor	1977–1995, 2009–2010
Top Gear	1977–present
Ski Sunday	1978–present
Antiques Roadshow	1979–present
Question Time	1979–present

=== 1980s ===
Programme	Date
Children in Need	1980–present
Timewatch	1982–present
The Bill	1984–2010
Channel 4 Racing	1984–2016
Thomas & Friends	1984–present
EastEnders	1985–present
Comic Relief	1985–present
Casualty	1986–present
Fireman Sam	1987–1994, 2005–2013
ChuckleVision	1987–2009
This Morning	1988–present
Red Dwarf	1988–1999, 2009, 2012–present
The Simpsons	1989–present

=== 1990s ===
Programme	Date
Have I Got News for You	1990–present
Heartbeat	1992–2010
A Touch of Frost	1992–2010
ITV News Meridian	1993–present
Shooting Stars	1993–2002, 2009–2011
Time Team	1994–2013
The National Lottery Draws	1994–2017
Top of the Pops 2	1994–2017
Hollyoaks	1995–present
Never Mind the Buzzcocks	1996–2015
Silent Witness	1996–present
Y Clwb Rygbi, Wales	1997–present
Midsomer Murders	1997–present
Who Wants to Be a Millionaire?	1998–2014
Bob the Builder	1998–present
Bremner, Bird and Fortune	1999–2010
British Soap Awards	1999–2019, 2022–present
Holby City	1999–2022

=== 2000s ===
Programme	Date
The Weakest Link	2000–2012, 2017–present
Big Brother	2000–2018
Real Crime	2001–2011
I'm a Celebrity...Get Me Out of Here!	2002–present
Harry Hill's TV Burp	2002–2012
Spooks	2002–2011
River City	2002–2026
Daily Politics	2003–2018
QI	2003–present
New Tricks	2003–2015
Peep Show	2003–2015
Politics Show	2003–2011
The Royal	2003–2011
This Week	2003–2019
Doc Martin	2004–2022
Hustle	2004–2012
Shameless	2004–2013
Strictly Come Dancing	2004–present
The X Factor	2004–2018
The Andrew Marr Show	2005–2021
Come Dine with Me	2005–present
It's Me or the Dog	2005–2012
Deal or No Deal	2005–2016
Dancing on Ice	2006–2014
Hotel Babylon	2006–2009
Numberjacks	2006–2009
Robin Hood	2006–2009
That Mitchell and Webb Look	2006–2010
Torchwood	2006–2011
Waterloo Road	2006–2015
Gavin & Stacey	2007–2010
The Sarah Jane Adventures	2007–2011
Would I Lie to You?	2007–present
M.I. High	2007–2014
Outnumbered	2007–2014
The Tudors	2007–2010
Trapped	2007–2010
Skins	2007–2013
Britain's Got Talent	2007–present
Ashes to Ashes	2008–2010
The Inbetweeners	2008–2010
Merlin	2008–2012
Only Connect	2008–present
Survivors	2008–2010
Wallander	2008–2016

== Ending this year ==
Date	Programme	Channel(s)	Debut(s)
6 February	Plus One	Channel 4	2007
7 February	Demons	ITV	2009
12 February	Victorian Farm	BBC Two	2009
26 February	Get 100	BBC One, BBC Two & CBBC	2007
5 March	The Green Green Grass	BBC One	2005
6 March	In the Night Garden...	BBC Two & CBeebies	2007
11 March	Minder	Five	1979, 1991 & 2009
20 March	Going for Gold	BBC One & Five	1987 & 2008
29 March	Yellowstone	BBC Two	2009
1 April	FM	ITV	2009
3 April	Moving Wallpaper	ITV	2008
11 April	The Colour of Money	ITV	2009
12 April	Al Murray's Multiple Personality Disorder	ITV	2009
12 April	Gladiators	ITV & Sky 1	1992 & 2008
27 April	Hell's Kitchen	ITV	2004
5 May	Born to Be Different	Channel 4	2003, 2006 & 2009
10 May	Shipwrecked	Channel 4	1999 & 2006
17 May	Pulling	BBC Three	2006
21 May	The Justin Lee Collins Show	ITV2	2009
22 May	Boy Meets Girl	ITV	2009
25 May	The Omid Djalili Show	BBC One	2007
31 May	Beat the Star	ITV	2008
27 June	Robin Hood	BBC One	2006
3 July	Richard & Judy's New Position	Watch	2008
9 July	Katie & Peter	ITV2	2007
12 July	Kingdom	ITV	2007
24 July	The Fuse	ITV	2009
26 July	Hope Springs	BBC One	2009
4 August	The Truth About Crime	BBC One	2009
9 August	Don't Forget the Lyrics!	Sky 1	2008
14 August	Hotel Babylon	BBC One	2006
17 August	The Street	BBC One	2006
23 August	Jam & Jerusalem	BBC One	2006
25 August	Desperate Romantics	BBC Two	2009
31 August	Wuthering Heights	ITV	2009
22 September	Lost Land of the Volcano	BBC One	2009
12 October	Blue Murder	ITV	2004
15 October	Katy Brand's Big Ass Show	ITV2	2007
25 October	Emma	BBC One	2009
31 October	The Well	BBC Two	2009
2 November	Murderland	ITV	2009
8 November	By Any Means 2	BBC Two	2009
12 November	Wife Swap	Channel 4	2003
12 November	How Clean Is Your House?	Channel 4	2003
13 November	Collision	ITV	2009
17 November	Around the World in 80 Days	BBC One	2009
24 November	It's Only a Theory	BBC Four	2009
11 December	Numberjacks	BBC Two & CBeebies	2006
12 December	Hole in the Wall	BBC One	2008
14 December	Life	BBC One	2009
18 December	Golden Balls	ITV	2007
18 December	The Paul O'Grady Show	ITV & Channel 4	2004
18 December	Trisha Goddard	ITV & Five	1998
18 December	More4 News	More4	2005
27 December	Return to Cranford	BBC One	2009
29 December	The Day of the Triffids	BBC One	2009
30 December	Big Top	BBC One	2009

== Births ==
Date	Name	Cinematic Credibility
16 March	Lillia Turner	British actress (EastEnders)

== Deaths ==
Date	Name	Age	Broadcast credibility
1 January	Edmund Purdom	84	Actor
11 January	David Vine	73	Sports presenter
13 January	Patrick McGoohan	80	Actor (The Prisoner, Danger Man, Columbo)
16 January	John Mortimer	85	Barrister, writer, novelist and dramatist (Rumpole of the Bailey)
18 January	Tony Hart	83	Children's TV presenter
18 January	Kathleen Byron	88	Actress (Black Narcissus, A Matter of Life and Death, The House in the Square)
24 January	Diane Holland	78	Actress (Hi-de-Hi!)
24 January	Reg Gutteridge	84	Boxing commentator
26 February	Wendy Richard	65	Actress (EastEnders, Are You Being Served?) aka Pauline Fowler
27 February	Sharat Sardana	40	Comedy scriptwriter (Goodness Gracious Me)
10 March	Derek Benfield	82	Actor (The Brothers, Hetty Wainthropp Investigates, First of the Summer Wine)
14 March	Terence Edmond	69	Actor (Z-Cars)
18 March	Natasha Richardson	45	Actress
22 March	Jade Goody	27	Reality TV star (Big Brother)
24 March	Timothy Brinton	79	British broadcaster and Conservative Party politician
8 April	Lennie Bennett	70	Comedian and game show host (Punchlines)
18 April	Stephanie Parker	22	Actress (Belonging)
20 May	Lucy Gordon	28	Actress
28 May	Terence Alexander	86	Actor
31 May	Danny La Rue	81	Entertainer
20 June	Colin Bean	83	Actor (Dad's Army)
22 June	Steve Race	88	Pianist and television presenter (My Music)
1 July	Mollie Sugden	86	Comedy actress (Are You Being Served?, Grace & Favour, The Liver Birds, Coronation Street)
12 July	Donald MacCormick	70	Broadcast journalist and presenter (Newsnight)
13 July	Vince Powell	80	Sitcom writer (Love Thy Neighbour)
24 July	Harry Towb	83	Actor
16 August	Laurie Rowley	68	Comedy writer (The Two Ronnies, Not the Nine O'Clock News)
29 August	Simon Dee	74	Television interviewer and radio disc jockey
13 September	Felix Bowness	87	Actor (Hi-de-Hi!)
14 September	Keith Floyd	65	Chef (Saturday Kitchen)
15 September	Troy Kennedy Martin	77	Screenwriter (Z-Cars, Edge of Darkness)
16 September	Brian Barron	69	BBC journalist and war correspondent
18 September	Peter Denyer	62	Actor (Please Sir!)
30 September	Robert S. Baker	87	Producer (The Saint)
16 November	Edward Woodward	79	Actor (Callan, The Equalizer)
2 December	Maggie Jones	75	Actress (Coronation Street) aka Blanche Hunt
5 December	Garfield Morgan	78	Actor (The Sweeney)
24 December	George Cowling	89	Britain television's first weather presenter

== See also ==
- 2009 in British music
- 2009 in British radio
- 2009 in the United Kingdom
- List of British films of 2009
