= Pack rat (disambiguation) =

A pack rat is a small rodent in the genus Neotoma.

Pack rat can also refer to:

- A person who engages in compulsive hoarding

== Computing ==
- Packrat parser, a parser that uses a parsing expression grammar

== Entertainment ==
- Peter Pack Rat, a 1985 arcade game
- Packrat (Transformers), a fictional character in the Transformers universe
- Pack Rat, a minor villain from Batman: The Animated Series.
- Packrat, a villain from Ryan's World

== See also ==
- Rat Pack (disambiguation)
