= Rat Pack (disambiguation) =

The Rat Pack was a group of entertainers in the 1950s and 1960s comprising primarily Frank Sinatra, Dean Martin, Sammy Davis Jr., Peter Lawford, and Joey Bishop; as well as others

Rat Pack may also refer to:

== Entertainment ==
=== Television ===
- "Rat Pack" (The Sopranos), an episode from Season 5 of The Sopranos television series
- The Rat Pack, Verminous Skumm's henchmen from the animated series Captain Planet and the Planeteers
- The Rat Pack (TV series), a 2009 British reality television series following London-based pest controllers that aired on BBC One

=== Music ===
- The Rattpack, a group of artists led by Logic
- The Rat Pack: Live From Las Vegas, a 2000 stage musical

=== Other ===
- The Rat Pack, stories in Battle Picture Weekly by Gerry Finley-Day and Carlos Ezquerra
- The Rat Pack (film), a 1998 TV film about the above-mentioned entertainers

== Sports ==
- The Rat Pack, a professional wrestling stable active in the Mid-South Wrestling promotion during 1982 and 1983, comprising Ted DiBiase, Jim Duggan and Matt Borne
- The Rat Pack, a group of racing drivers active in the late 1980s and early 1990s, comprising Julian Bailey, Mark Blundell, Martin Donnelly, Johnny Herbert, Damon Hill and Perry McCarthy
- The student section for the St. John's University Johnnies Football team

== Other uses ==
- Liberal Party of Canada Rat Pack, a group of Canadian Liberal Members of Parliament
- Commonwealth military colloquial for Ration Packs, individual meals for one soldier in field conditions

== See also ==
- RatPac Entertainment, an American media company
