= Evan Davis =

British journalist and presenter

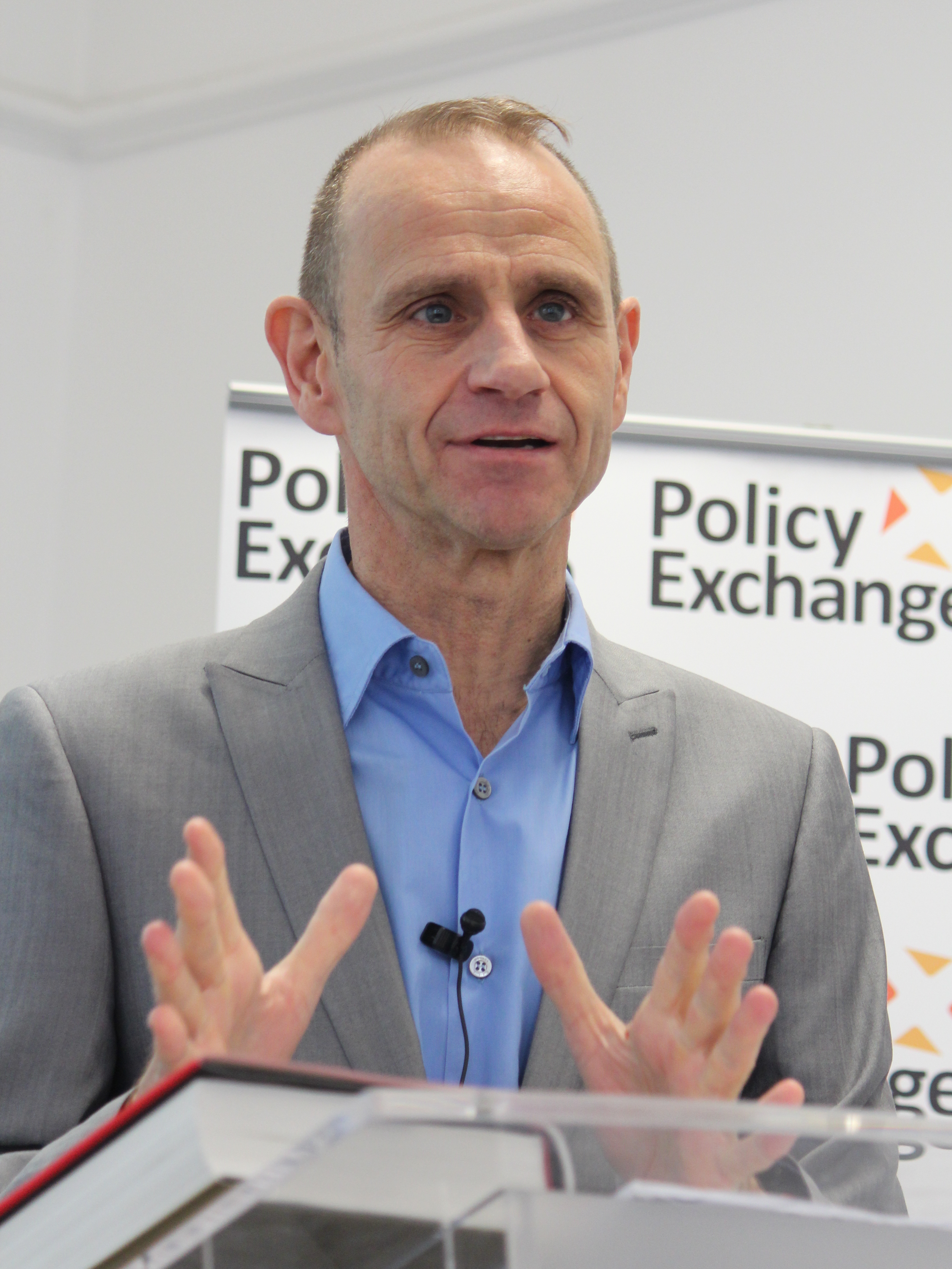
- Davis in 2014
- Born: Evan Harold Davis; 8 April 1962 (age 64); Malvern, Worcestershire, England
- Education: University of Oxford; Harvard University
- Occupations: Journalist and TV presenter
- Years active: 1986–present
- Employer: BBC
- Notable credits: Dragons' Den (2005–); PM (2018–); Today (2008–2014); Newsnight (2014–2018)
- Title: Economics Editor of BBC News (2001–2008)
- Spouse: Guillaume Baltz (m. 2022)
- Evan Davis's voice recorded August 2013

Evan Harold Davis (born 8 April 1962) is an English broadcaster and former economist. Working for the BBC, he has presented Dragons' Den on BBC Television since 2005, and PM on BBC Radio 4 since 2018. He also presents The Bottom Line, a business-related discussion programme.

In October 2001, Davis took over from Peter Jay as the BBC's economics editor. He left this post in April 2008 to become a presenter on Radio 4's Today programme. In September 2014, he left Today to be the main presenter of Newsnight for four years. On 5 November 2018, Davis began presenting Radio 4's PM programme.

== Early life and education ==
Davis was born in Malvern, Worcestershire, to South African parents, Quintin Visser Davis, an engineer, and Hazel Noreen Davis, who would train to become a psychotherapist. He has two older brothers, Beric and Roland. The family had emigrated from South Africa to Malvern in January 1962 (Hazel was then pregnant with Davis) in reaction to apartheid. Two years later the family moved to Ashtead, Surrey, where Davis grew up.

Davis attended Dorking County Grammar School, which in 1976 became The Ashcombe School, Dorking, where he was head boy. Davis then attended St John's College, Oxford between 1981 and 1984, gaining a First in Philosophy, Politics and Economics, before obtaining a Master of Public Administration at Harvard Kennedy School at Harvard University where he held a Harkness Fellowship. While at Oxford University, he edited Cherwell, the student newspaper.

== Early career ==
Davis began work as an economist at the Institute for Fiscal Studies, and while there he was briefly seconded to help officials work on early development of the Community Charge system of local government taxation (better known as the poll tax). In 1988 he moved to the London Business School, writing articles for their publication Business Strategy Review. He returned to the Institute for Fiscal Studies in 1992, writing a paper on "Britain, Europe and the Square Mile" for the European Policy Forum which argued that British financial prosperity depended on being seen as a bridgehead to the European Union.

In 1993, Davis joined the BBC as an economics correspondent. He worked as economics editor on BBC Two's Newsnight programme from 1997 to 2001. In the mid-1990s he was a member of the Social Market Foundation's Advisory Council; he is a member of the British-American Project for the Successor Generation.

== BBC ==
=== Economics editor ===
As the BBC's economics editor, Davis was responsible for reporting and analysing economic developments on a range of programmes on BBC radio and television, particularly the Ten O'Clock News. He also had a role in shaping the extensive BBC coverage of economics across all the corporation's outputs, including online.

Davis also wrote a blog for the BBC website entitled Evanomics in which he "attempts to understand the real world, using the tool kit of economics". Subjects he discussed included road pricing, care for the elderly, Gordon Brown's budget and how to choose wine.

Davis has won several awards including the Work Foundation's Broadcast Journalist of the Year award in 1998, 2001 and 2003, and the Harold Wincott Business Broadcaster of the Year award in 2002. In 2008, Davis was ranked first in the Independent on Sunday's "pink list" of the hundred most influential gay and lesbian figures in British society.

On 23 May 2005, Davis crossed picket lines during a day of industrial action by BBC staff over announced job cuts. Other notable broadcasters who turned up for work during the strike included Terry Wogan, Shelagh Fogarty and Declan Curry. Davis was also noted for breaking a strike at the BBC which had been called by the National Union of Journalists: on 6 November 2010, he arrived to present the Today Programme at 3:30 am, along with fellow presenter Sarah Montague, although this was not technically crossing a picket line as they arrived before it was formed.

=== Today programme ===
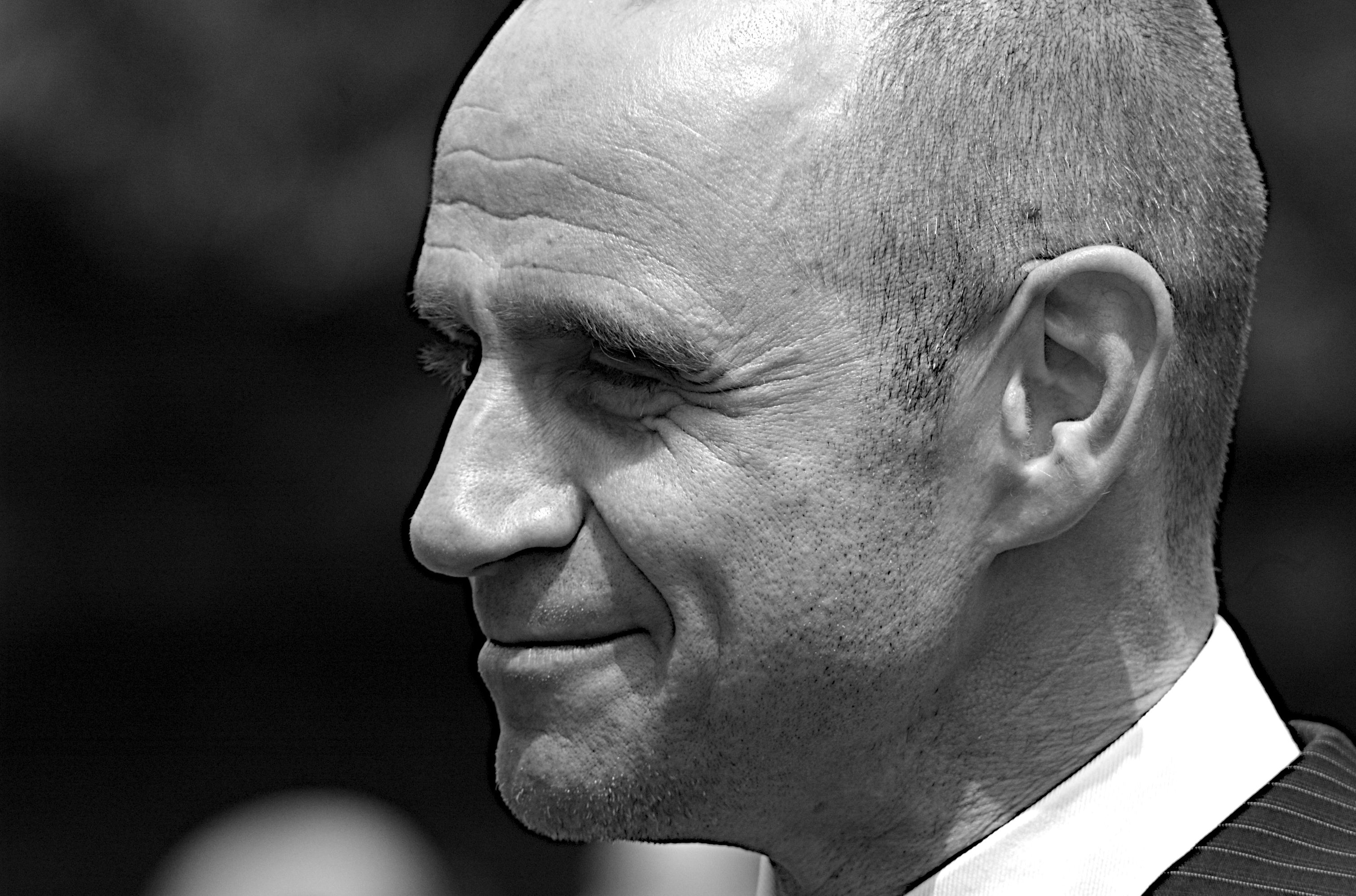
Davis in 2007

In mid-2007, Davis was a guest presenter on the Today programme for two weeks. In April 2008, he stood down as BBC Economics Editor to join the Today programme as a full-time presenter, replacing Carolyn Quinn. In 2009, Davis said that one of the best things about presenting on the radio is that "you can look things up on Wikipedia while on air".

=== The Bottom Line programme ===
On top of his duties at Today, Davis also presents The Bottom Line. It is a weekly business discussion programme which generally includes three or four business leaders or entrepreneurs responding to several topical questions regarding business-related issues. First aired in 2006, the programme is a co-production between BBC News and the Open University. As of September 2013, The Bottom Line runs 26 weeks of the year in three series: at 8:30 pm on Thursdays on BBC Radio 4, with a repeat showing at 5:30 pm on Saturdays and a television recording at 9:30 pm on Saturdays and Sundays on the BBC News Channel. The programme is broadcast internationally on the BBC World Service and BBC World News.

Additionally, Davis presents Dragons' Den on BBC Two.

In 2012, Davis presented Built in Britain, which looked at the role of major infrastructure projects in the UK, including examining the impact of the M25 on the town of Ashtead in Surrey where he grew up.

In 2014, Davis presented a BBC Two series Mind the Gap: London vs the Rest in which he explored the economic forces in Britain and why the capital city is so dominant.

=== Newsnight ===
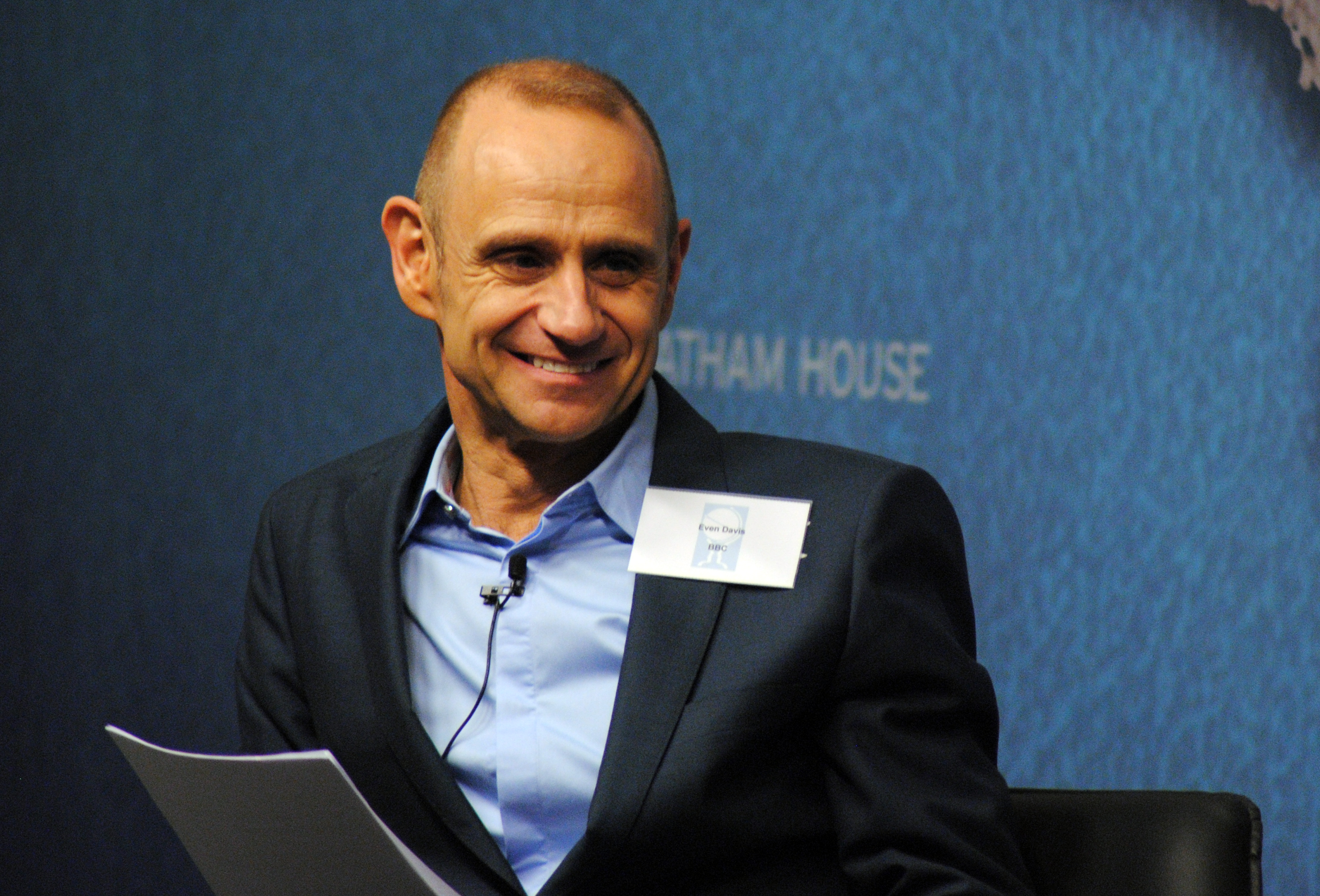
Davis in 2013

On 21 July 2014, it was announced that Davis would replace Jeremy Paxman as presenter of Newsnight starting in autumn 2014. His last appearance as a presenter on Today was 26 September 2014.

In 2017 Davis was found to have breached BBC rules on due impartiality in coverage of the 2017 French presidential election on Newsnight, giving the impression that he favoured Emmanuel Macron over Marine Le Pen. The BBC Executive Complaints Unit ruled that Davis's approaches in back-to-back interviews with representatives of the Macron and Le Pen campaigns was so marked as to constitute bias.

After four years with Newsnight, it was announced that Davis would move on to become the presenter of the BBC Radio 4 PM programme. His final show was broadcast on 30 October 2018.

=== PM programme ===
Davis began presenting Radio 4's PM on 5 November 2018.

== Writing ==
Davis's first book, Public Spending, was published in 1998. In it he argued for the privatisation of public services as a means of increasing efficiency. Davis's second book, Made in Britain: How the Nation Earns Its Living, was published in May 2011. His third book, Post-Truth: Why We Have Reached Peak Bullshit and What We Can Do About It was published in May 2017.

== Personal life ==
Davis lives in Kennington, London with his husband Guillaume Baltz, a French landscape architect. They married on 6 July 2022, at Lambeth Town Hall, the tenth anniversary of their civil partnership and the twentieth anniversary of their first meeting. Davis's father, who was 92 and seriously ill with bowel cancer and heart problems, killed himself on the day of Davis's wedding in 2022, with Davis being informed later that day.

Davis is the owner of a whippet named Mr. Whippy and is a keen motorcyclist, seen riding a Yamaha YZF-R6 motorcycle in BBC Two's 2009 The City Uncovered with Evan Davis.

== Honours and awards ==
Davis holds honorary degrees from the Open University; City, University of London; Cardiff University, Coventry University and Aston University., University of York

== Publications ==
- Public Spending. Harmondsworth: Penguin Books. 1998. ISBN 0-14-026446-9.
- Made in Britain. London: Little, Brown and Company. 2011. ISBN 978-140-8703-304.
- Post-Truth: Why We Have Reached Peak Bullshit and What We Can Do About It. London: Little, Brown and Company. 2017. ISBN 978-140-8703-311.

== See also ==
- Working Lunch, on BBC2

Media offices
Preceded by Peter Jay	Economics Editor: BBC News; 2001 – 2008	Succeeded by Stephanie Flanders
Preceded by Carolyn Quinn	Today presenter 2007 – 2014 with John Humphrys, James Naughtie, Edward Stourton, Sarah Montague, Carolyn Quinn, Justin Webb, and Mishal Husain	Succeeded by N/A
Preceded by Jeremy Paxman	BBC's Newsnight presenter 2014–present with Kirsty Wark, Emily Maitlis and Laura Kuenssberg	Incumbent
