= Mind the Gap: London vs the Rest =

- Genre: Factual
- Directed by: Tristan Quinn; Fiona Blair
- Presented by: Evan Davis
- Country of origin: United Kingdom
- Original language: English
- No. of series: 1
- No. of episodes: 2 (list of episodes)

Production
- Executive producer: Sam Collyns
- Running time: 60 minutes

Original release
- Network: BBC Two; BBC Two HD
- Release: 3 March – 10 March 2014

Mind the Gap: London vs the Rest is a British factual television series that was first broadcast on BBC Two on 3 March 2014. The two-part series is presented by Evan Davis and is about the economic forces in Britain.

== Episode list ==
No.	Title	Directed by	Original release date
1	"Episode 1"	Tristan Quinn	3 March 2014
2	"Episode 2"	Fiona Blair	10 March 2014
