= Tough Guy or Chicken? =

- Genre: Reality
- Written by: Various
- Country of origin: United Kingdom
- Original language: English
- No. of series: 1
- No. of episodes: 8

Production
- Executive producer: Gary Hunter
- Running time: 60 minutes
- Production company: BBC

Original release
- Network: BBC Three
- Release: 20 August – 8 October 2009

Tough Guy or Chicken? is a 2009 reality television series shown on BBC Three. It involves five young British men spending four months travelling the world taking tough challenges with deadly animals and in hostile locations. The series is made up of 8 episodes where, in each, the men are taken to a different part of the world to take on the different challenges that await them. If they are not up for the tasks required of them they fail the given challenge.

Ross Edgley, who was then 22 years old, took part.

== Episodes ==
No.	Featured location	Original release date
1	Ecuador	20 August 2009
Challenge: In the Andes where they must become chagras
2	Siberia	27 August 2009
Challenge: In the Siberian Arctic to become Evenki reindeer herders
3	Mexico	3 September 2009
Challenge: In the Mexico's Yucatan peninsula and become cave-divers
4	Amazon	10 September 2009
Challenge: Six days of a jungle initiation to become men
5	Namibia	17 September 2009
Challenge: With the Ju-Wasi tribe of San Bushmen on a traditional hunt
6	Bahamas	24 September 2009
Challenge: To become shark wranglers in just six days
7	Bangladesh	1 October 2009
Challenge: To catch venomous snakes
8	Japan	8 October 2009
Challenge: To become Buddhist Yamabushi monks and take part in one of the toughest pilgrimages

== Results ==
Pos	Contestant	EP1	EP2	EP3	EP4	EP5	EP6	EP7	EP8
1	Nick	P	P	P	P	P	P	F	P
2=	Ross Edgley	P	P	P	P	F	F	F	F
2=	Reuben	F	P	F	P	P	F	F	P
4	Easton	F	F	F	P	F	F	P	P
5	Ben	F	F	F	F	P	F	F	F

== See also ==
Last Man Standing (UK TV series)
