= The Baby Channel =

Former UK TV channel

Ownership
- Owner: Simply Media

History
- Launched: 10 October 2005; 19 years ago
- Closed: 24 November 2008; 16 years ago
- Replaced by: Simply Movies

Links
- Website: www.babychanneltv.com

The Baby Channel was a television channel aimed towards pregnant women and parents of pre-school children. Broadcast in the United Kingdom, it launched on 10 October 2005 on the Sky Digital platform. It closed down at 6am on 24 November 2008. The channel was then rebranded Simply Movies and moved EPG numbers from 272 to 341.
