= Ross Edgley =

British adventurer and athlete (born 1985)

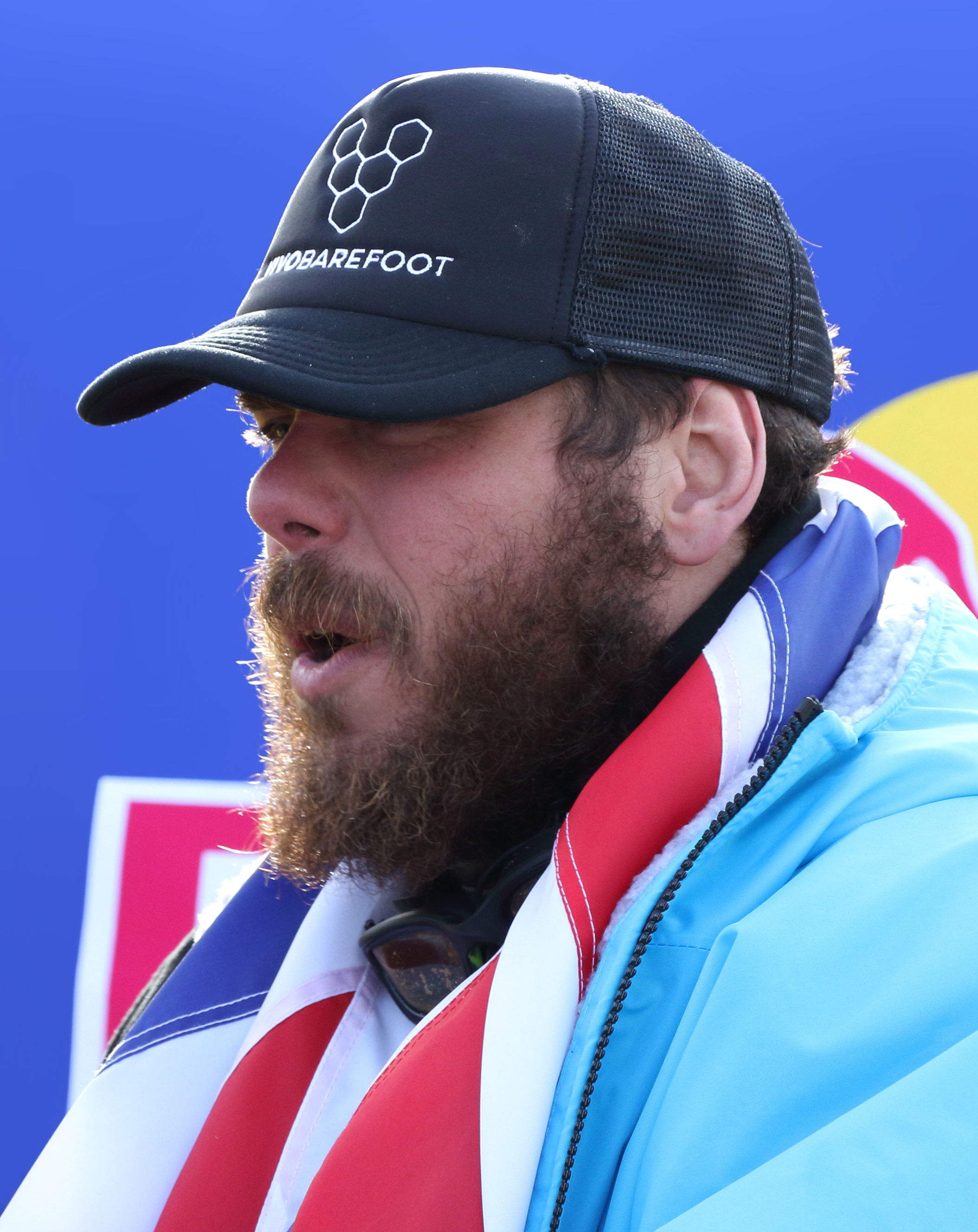
- Edgley in 2018 after completing the Great British Swim at Margate
- Born: 13 October 1985 (age 41); Grantham, Lincolnshire, England
- Occupations: Extreme adventurer, swimmer, author

Ross Edgley (born 13 October 1985) is a British athlete, ultra-marathon sea swimmer and author. He holds multiple world records, but is most recognised for completing the World's Longest Staged Sea Swim in 2018, when he became the first person in history to swim 1,780 miles (2,860 km) around Great Britain, in 157 days (voted Performance of the Year by the World Open Water Swimming Association.) In 2024, he also became the first person in history to simultaneously hold official Guinness World Records for long-distance swimming in the sea and river when he broke the record for the longest non-stop, continuous river swim down the Yukon River (318 miles/510km). In 2025, he also became the first person in history to swim 1,000 miles (1,609km) around Iceland in 114 days.

Edgley has documented his training, nutrition, theories and strategies and published them in his books titled The World's Fittest Book (2018), The Art of Resilience (2020), and Blueprint: Build a Bulletproof Body for Extreme Adventure in 365 Days (2021), all of which became Sunday Times bestsellers and have been translated into several other languages.

== Background ==
Edgley was born into a sporting family in Grantham, Lincolnshire. His father was a tennis coach and his mother was a sprinter. Although playing many sports as a child (football, rugby, trail running and tennis), he specialised in swimming and water polo and represented his country internationally at junior level whilst studying at The King's School, Grantham.

He later gained a sports scholarship to study at Loughborough University's School of Sport and Exercise Science, where he continued to train at the British Swimming National Centre. A year into his scholarship, Edgley then retired from international competition and decided to transition into ultra-distance sea swimming instead, which the university supported through the National Centre for Sport and Exercise Medicine.

In 2019, he received an honorary doctorate from Bishop Grosseteste University (BGU) in Lincoln, for his research into mental and physical resilience and continues to coach and lecture around the world in the science and psychology of adventure.

== Swimming records ==
=== The Great British Swim (2018) ===
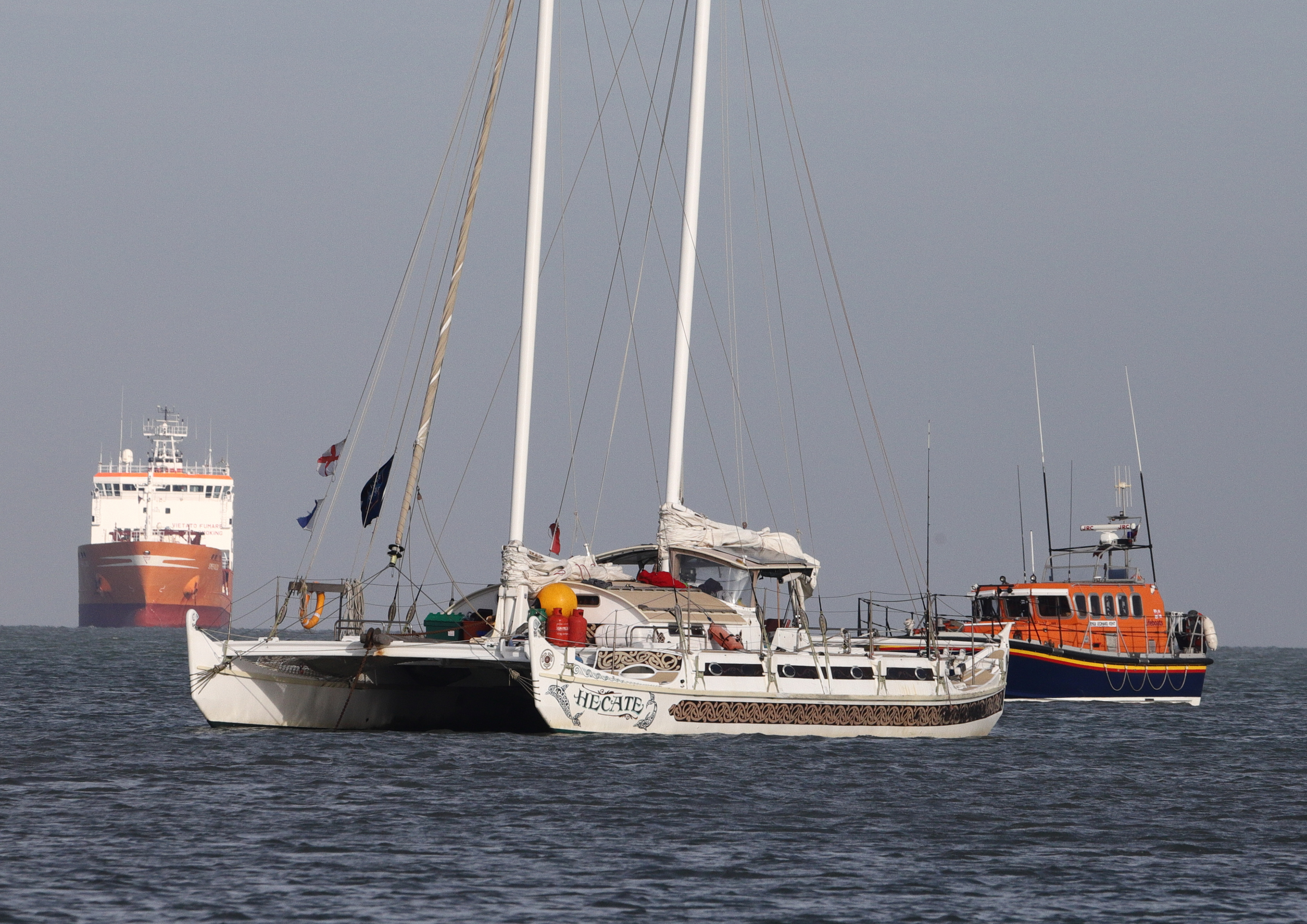
Edgley's support boat Hecate

Between June and November 2018, Edgley completed a 157-day 1,792 miles (2,884 km) swim around Britain. Aided by a team of experts which monitored the tides and his health in his 16 metres (52 ft) support boat Hecate, he typically swam for six hours, rested for six hours, and then swam for another six hours on repeat. He typically consumed around 15,000 calories a day.

The gruelling swim took its toll on his body, disintegrating his tongue through the eroding effect of the salt, giving him "Rhino Neck" from the effect of the wetsuit rubbing, and his feet entirely losing their arches and turning a deep purple and yellow. The team treated him with Sudocrem, Vaseline, plasters, bin bags and duct tape. Edgley's journey was documented as a weekly internet series, "Ross Edgley's Great British Swim", produced by Red Bull TV.

After completing the swim in Margate on 4 November 2018, the World Open Water Swimming Association announced it as the World Swim of the Year 2018 and it became officially recognised as "The World's Longest Staged Sea Swim." Talking about his historic swim Edgley said, "It's my hope that people remember the Great British Swim as an example or experiment in both mental and physical fortitude."

=== Length of the English Channel (2018) ===
During his circumnavigation swim of Great Britain, Edgley also broke several other records. Notably this involved becoming the first person to swim the length of the English Channel from Dover to Land's End, over 350 miles (563 km) in 30 days. Edgley never celebrated the achievement, however, and instead joked it was only a "warm up" because he still had 1,442 miles to swim (and 127 days at sea) before he completed his much larger mission and arrived back in Margate, Kent.

=== Land's End to John o' Groats (2018) ===
Edgley also accidentally became the fastest person to swim the 900 miles (1,400 km) from Land's End to John o' Groats in 62 days. More than halving the time of the previous record (from Sean Conway of 135 days), Edgley and his crew said they did not realise they had broken another record and were just trying to swim fast enough to avoid an Arctic storm approaching from Iceland. He then became the first person to swim the length of the Moray Firth, before heading to the English border at Berwick-upon-Tweed where he joked, "It was all downhill from here".

=== Yukon River, Canada (2024) ===
Between 16 and 18 June 2024, Edgley set a new official Guinness World Record for his 510km non-stop swim down the Yukon River in Canada. Swimming between Whitehorse and Dawson City, Edgley was not permitted to stop, sleep or touch the boat as per the rules set by WOWSA (World Open Water Swimming Association). The lowest water temperature recorded was 8°C (46.4°F), which is why to counteract the cold effect of continual immersion in water, he gained 15 kilos of weight by consuming 20,000 calories a day. In addition to the threat of hypothermia, Edgley had to navigate white water rapids, bears and wolves.

=== Iceland Swim (2025) ===
Between 17th May and 8th September, Edgley became the first person to swim the entire coastline of Iceland. Covering approximately 1,610km (1,000 miles) over 114 consecutive days, he completed the circumnavigation in waters that regularly fell below 5°C (41°F), while navigating powerful tides, unpredictable North Atlantic weather, jellyfish and remote stretches of coastline. The expedition supported marine conservation and scientific research in collaboration with researchers from the University of Iceland and the University of Victoria, collecting environmental data to improve understanding of North Atlantic marine ecosystems and the impacts of climate change. The swim was documented as a feature-length documentary and ratified by the World Open Water Swimming Association.

== Other athletic achievements ==
On 22 January 2016, Edgley began a marathon (26.2 miles (42.2 km)) around the Silverstone circuit in Northamptonshire, pulling a 1,400 kilograms (3,100 lb) car. The event was dubbed "The World's Strongest Marathon". As part of his training for the event, he went on a special 6,000 calorie plus daily diet and had already done a 16 miles (26 km) pull with the Mini during training. He completed the marathon endeavor to raise money for the Teenage Cancer Trust, Children With Cancer, Sports Aid and United Through Sport.

A few months later, on 22 April 2016, Edgley also began his "World’s Longest Rope Climb" conquest at Pippingford Park in the Ashdown Forest of Sussex, in which he completed a rope climb of 8,848 metres (29,029 ft), the exact height of Mount Everest, in 19 hours and 54 minutes. The money raised went to the Teenage Cancer Trust.

Other feats to raise money for charity include a 1,000 miles (1,600 km) barefoot run in a month carrying a 50 kilograms (110 lb) backpack, an Olympic Distance Triathlon carrying a 45.4 kilograms (100 lb) tree, swimming over 62 miles (100 km) across the Caribbean Sea pulling a 45.4 kilograms (100 lb) tree, swimming non-stop for 48 hours at the Commando Training Centre for the Royal Marines, and completing 30 marathons in 30 days.

== Injuries ==
=== Loch Ness, Scotland (2022) ===
On 23 September 2022, Edgley undertook a charity swim in Loch Ness, Scotland. Known for being the largest lake (by volume) in the UK, the water temperature rarely reaches above 5°C (41°F). Which is why, in preparation for the extreme endurance event and to counteract the cold effect of continual immersion in water, he gained 10 kilos of weight by consuming 10,000 calories a day. After 52 hours and 39 minutes he was forced to end his swim early, due to the onset of cellulitis and hypothermia and was taken to hospital. The swim was done in support of Parley for the Oceans (a nonprofit environmental organisation that focuses on ocean conservation), and was not observed by any swimming authority. The route and precise distance are unknown, but Ross remains the only person to survive swimming in a wetsuit in the cold waters of Loch Ness for more than 52 hours.

=== Lake Trasimeno, Italy (2023) ===
On 13 July 2023, Edgley was scheduled to attempt another ultra-marathon charity swim in Lake Trasimeno, Italy. During this time the Italian Meteorological Society warned of a deadly heatwave hitting the area where temperatures exceeded 45°C (113°F). Dubbed the 'Cerberus heat wave' after the mythical monster that guards the gates of hell the World Meteorological Organisation later confirmed this was the hottest month ever recorded on earth. This caused the water temperature to rise above 34°C (93.2°F) which the Federation Internationale De Natation (FINA) states is unsafe for ultra-marathon swims due to heat stroke since the maximum temperature of water for FINA-sanctioned open water swimming competitions is 31°C (87.8°F). This rule follows a study carried out by the University of Otago in New Zealand that was conducted in collaboration with FINA, the International Olympic Committee and the International Triathlon Union today. Despite the warnings, Edgley still wanted to attempt the swim for his charity partners. After 32 hours and 107 kilometres (66 mi) he was pulled out the water due to heat stroke and hyperthermia.

== Books ==
Edgley has written five books: The World’s Fittest Book (2018), The Art of Resilience: Strategies for an Unbreakable Mind and Body (2020), Blueprint: Build a bulletproof body for extreme adventure in 365 days (2021) and The World’s Fittest Cookbook (2022), How to Hero: Find Strength, Forge Resilience and Fulfil Your Purpose (2026)

== Media Projects ==
=== BBC3 Tough Guy or Chicken (2009) ===
In 2009, Edgley took part in a BBC reality television series where he travelled the world taking on challenges with deadly animals and in hostile locations around the world.

=== C4 (UK) Sink or Swim (2019) ===
In 2019, he coached 10 celebrities (who were previously unable to swim) to attempt a 21 mile (34 km) relay across the English Channel to raise money for the charity Stand Up to Cancer. The team consisted of actors, musicians, comedians and Olympic champions and was titled Sink or Swim. Despite failing to complete the swim due to weather conditions (only 5 km from shore), the series was, "a summer hit for Channel 4, averaging around 2 million viewers across its four-episode run" raising thousands for charity.

=== National Geographic (Global) Limitless with Chris Hemsworth (2022) ===
In 2022, Edgley appeared in the National Geographic/Disney+ series Limitless with Chris Hemsworth, where he trained actor Chris Hemsworth in a series of athletic adventures designed to push the limits of human performance as his body was tested by experts. In one episode, he coached Hemsworth to complete a 500-metre ice swim across a Nordic Fjord (high above the arctic circle) where the water temperature was recorded at 1 °C (33.8 °F), all on only 7 days training. In another episode Edgley taught Hemsworth to climb a rope 100-ft rope (30.5 metres) that was suspended from a cable car 1,000 ft in the Blue Mountains, Australia.

=== National Geographic (Global) Shark vs. Ross Edgley (2024) ===
In 2024, Edgley appeared in the National Geographic/Disney+ documentary, "Shark vs Ross Edgley" where he went head-to-head and competed against four of the ocean’s most formidable sharks in one of the most unique shark-sports science study ever conducted. Over 2 years Edgley completely changed his diet and training in an effort to try and polaris jump out the water like a white shark, swim as fast as a mako shark, eat as much as a tiger shark and endure the same G-force as a hammerhead when hunting. Working with world leading shark experts, Forbes magazine stated, "The special is not just an adrenaline-pumping adventure but also a profound exploration of shark behaviour, biology, and conservation," adding, "Throughout the special, viewers gain a deeper appreciation for the intelligence, curiosity, and grace of these often misunderstood creatures." Gaining global recognition and reaching millions worldwide, Edgley famously coined the term, "Tiger Shark Bulk" during the eating challenge where he ate 30,000 calories and gained 10kg (22lbs) in 24 hours to trying to match the appetite and digestive system of a tiger shark that can consume over 25,000 calories in a single bite. Notably, it was the highest caloric intake recorded over 24 hours at University's School of Sport and Exercise Science at the National Centre for Sport and Exercise Medicine.

=== The Great Icelandic Swim (Global) (2025) ===
In 2026, Edgley starred in the three-part Channel 4 documentary series The Great Icelandic Swim with Ross Edgley, which followed his successful attempt to become the first person to swim the entire coastline of Iceland. Over 114 consecutive days, he covered approximately 1,000 miles (1,610 km) through some of the coldest and most challenging waters in the North Atlantic, battling hypothermia, severe weather, powerful tides, jellyfish and prolonged isolation. Alongside documenting the physical and psychological demands of the expedition, the series also highlighted marine conservation and scientific research, with environmental organisations using the swim to raise awareness of ocean health, biodiversity and the impacts of climate change on Iceland's marine ecosystems. The documentary was broadcast nationally on Channel 4 in the United Kingdom and internationally through streaming platform.

== Publications ==
- Edgley, Ross (2018). The World's Fittest Book. Sphere. ISBN 978-0-7515-7254-4.
- Edgley, Ross (2020). The Art of Resilience: Strategies for an Unbreakable Mind and Body. HarperCollins. ISBN 978-0-00-835698-9.
- Edgley, Ross (2022). The World's Fittest Cookbook. HarperCollins. ISBN 978-0-00-846561-2.
