= Real Estate TV =

- Country: United Kingdom

Programming
- Picture format: 16:9, 576i

Ownership
- Owner: Fox International Channels (News Corporation)

History
- Launched: October 2004
- Closed: 1 April 2009

Links
- Website: realestatetv.tv

Real Estate TV, also known as RETV, was an award-winning UK-based television channel and multi-media company that formed part of News Corporation's Fox International Channels' network.

As a simulcast company, RETV was the UK's only dedicated property television channel, and it successfully bridges the divide between traditional television transmission and new media, online, on demand broadcasting.

Launched in October 2004 by Mark Dodd, its founding partner and Bruce Dunlop on the British Sky Broadcasting platform and closed on 1 April 2009, Real Estate TV was available on Sky Channels 262 and 263, on demand on Virgin TV and at www.realestatetv.tv

The channel broadcast 24 hours a day on Sky Channel 262 and had a +1 service available on Sky Channel 263. RETV broadcast to over 21 million adult viewers in the UK and Ireland, and to millions more across Europe. The company was based at FIC's studios at Shepherd's Bush in London and Real Estate TV was a member of the Association of International Property Professionals.

Steve Dawkins, managing director of the company continued to lead Real Estate TV despite the January 2008 controlling stake purchase by Fox International Channels (FIC)

Programming included the transmission of quality, entertaining property programs from the UK and around the world, as well as RETV commissioned series such as Next Big Thing.

Next Big Thing specifically focuses on global emerging property markets of interest and financial potential to the channel's viewers.

Online on its own dedicated website, RETV offered streaming video, a property finder service, international real estate news and value added viewer services such as currency exchange, insurance and international mortgages.

RETV also offered free-to-view video content via Tiscali, Blinx, Jalipo and BT Vision. It was as a result of the RETV online expansion and development that in 2006 the channel won the Best Use of Broadband award at the Broadcast Digital Channel Awards and RETV also won the OPP Special Innovation Award in 2007

As an advertisement platform for property professionals, Real Estate TV allowed brand owners to target property-focused consumers through spot advertising, sponsorship, or advertiser funded programming. Tailor-made, long-form advertisements can be produced by the RETV creative team as well, offering developers, agents and property professionals the opportunity to showcase their properties or services in a measurable way to secure leads for example.

== List of programmes ==
- Buyer's Guide to Florida
- Buyer's Guide to Spain
- FOCUS Calabria
- FOCUS Costa de la Luz
- FOCUS Rhodes
- FOCUS Romania
- FOCUS Ski Bulgaria
- FOCUS Slovakia
- FOCUS SW France
- Home for the Future
- House Hunters International
- Living in Algarve
- Living in Andalucia
- Living in Bristol
- Living in Costa Blanca
- Living in Costa de Almeria
- Living in Costa del Sol
- Living in Cyprus
- Living in Docklands
- Living in French Riviera
- Living in Liverpool
- Living in Manchester
- Living in Miami
- Living in Orlando
- Living in Southern Italy
- Location, Location Amazing Homes
- Next Big Thing – Ajman & Ras Al Khaimah
- Next Big Thing – Cape Verde
- Next Big Thing – Caribbean
- Next Big Thing – Costa De La Luz
- Next Big Thing – Costa Vista & Marrakech
- Next Big Thing – Dubai
- Next Big Thing – Morocco
- Next Big Thing – Murcia
- Next Big Thing – Tennessee
- Next Big Thing – Turkey
- Property Matters
- World's Most Extreme Homes

== On-air staff ==
- David Dominey
- Ruth England
- Scott Huggins
- Deborah Hutton
- Kevin Kennedy
- Melissa Porter
- Jo Sinnott
- Suzanne Whang
