= The Real Swiss Family Robinson =

- Genre: Factual
- Narrated by: David Mitchell
- Country of origin: United Kingdom
- Original language: English
- No. of series: 1
- No. of episodes: 4

Production
- Producer: David Mackay
- Running time: 60 minutes

Original release
- Network: BBC One
- Release: 27 March – 17 April 2009

The Real Swiss Family Robinson is a four-part BBC television miniseries in which different families leave their regular lives behind and sample life on a desert island.

== Episode list ==
#	Episode	Subject	Airdate	Viewership
1	"The Dyes in Kiribati"	The Dye family from Essex sample life on the desert island of Anariki in Kiribati.	27 March 2009	4.1 million
2	"The Busbys in Panama"	The Busby family reconnect as they experience life on an island off the coast of Panama.	3 April 2009	3.4 million
3	"The Hunts in the Cook Islands"	The Hunt family from Swindon head off to The Cook Islands.	10 April 2009	2.7 million
4	"The Blanchs in Tanzania"	The Blanch family spends some family time on an island off Pemba in Tanzania.	17 April 2009	2.6 million
