= The Fuse (game show) =

British game show

- Genre: Game show
- Presented by: Austin Healey
- Country of origin: United Kingdom
- Original language: English
- No. of series: 1
- No. of episodes: 10

Production
- Running time: 60 minutes (inc. adverts)
- Production company: ITV Studios

Original release
- Network: ITV
- Release: 13 July – 24 July 2009

The Fuse is a British game show that aired on ITV from 13 to 24 July 2009 and is hosted by Austin Healey.

== Gameplay ==
=== Six-in-a-Row ===
Twelve categories are shown on a board, each containing a different sum of money from £1 to £5,000. One contestant selects a category and starting with the person at the end of a line with six contestants, a digital fuse portraying the time remaining is lit and the team have two minutes to answer six questions in a row correctly (hence the name of the round). If a player gets a question wrong, the chain is broken and play goes back to the first player. The team have two lifelines in this round, the first one is Confer where the player in control can ask their teammates for help, and the second one is Quickfire where the team must answer a list-style question in the same order without conferring, all while the fuse is still burning. If the team answer six questions in a row, the money is put in the prize fund, but if the team runs out of time, the box explodes and the money is lost. Six categories are played in this round, one for each player who picks the categories, with each category ten seconds shorter than the last one. The twelve categories are Natural World, Famous People, Pop Music, Sport, Books, Science & Technology, Television, History, Movies, Food & Drink, Travel, and Words & Numbers. The twelve money amounts are £1, £50, £100, £150, £250, £500, £1,000, £1,500, £2,000, £3,000, £4,000, and £5,000.

=== Burnout ===
Each contestant picks a category from the remaining six for themselves. Then, the two contestants who answered the most questions correctly in Six in a Row choose two teammates each to be on their team. Each contestant has a 90-second fuse which are all unlit at the start of the round. Healey asks a question from the three players' chosen categories and the first player to buzz in with a correct answer chooses one of their other players' fuses to light. One of these situations can occur:

- If a player's fuse is lit and they answer a question right, their fuse stops burning and the player's fuse that isn't lit starts burning.
- If a player's fuse is lit and they answer a question wrong, they lose ten seconds from their fuse.
- If a player's fuse is unlit and they answer a question right, their fuse stays unlit while the others keep burning.
- If a player's fuse is unlit and they answer a question wrong, their fuse starts burning.

The process is repeated with the other team and their chosen categories. Whenever a player's fuse burns out, that player is out of the game along with their category. The round ends when four fuses burn out (two for each team) and the two remaining players move on to the next round along with their categories.

=== Firefight ===
The two remaining players are each given a 60-second fuse, both of which are lit at the start of the game. Both players continue to answer questions from their chosen category. Whenever a player answers a question correctly, their fuse stops burning and the other player's fuse starts burning (similar to Grand Slam). When one player's fuse burns out, the other player wins and adds the money in their fuse box to the money won in Six in a Row which they play for in the final round.

=== The Final Fuse ===
The winning player has 70 seconds to answer six general knowledge questions correctly to win the prize fund. If they do it in 60 seconds, they win double the money, if they do it in 50 seconds or less, they win triple the money. If time runs out, they leave with nothing. The theoretical maximum a player could win is £51,000; in order for that to happen, the seven highest amounts must be banked (£5,000 + £4,000 + £3,000 + £2,000 + £1,500 + £1,000 + £500 = £17,000) and the bank must be tripled (£17,000 × 3 = £51,000).
