= Made in Scotland =

- Genre: Factual
- Presented by: John Michie
- Country of origin: Scotland
- Original language: English

Production
- Camera setup: Multi-camera
- Running time: 60 minutes (including adverts)
- Production company: STV Studios

Original release
- Network: STV
- Release: 23 July – 6 August 2009

Made in Scotland is a 3-part documentary series produced by STV Studios and broadcast on STV in Northern and Central Scotland in 2009, presented by Taggart actor John Michie. The show has since been broadcast across the UK on digital channel Blighty.

Exploring the country, its people and its culture, this series has seen celebrities examining Scottish icons that many Scots take for granted, while revealing little known history and also challenging popular assumptions.

The programme was made by STV, in association with the Daily Record and Sunday Mail, to celebrate Homecoming Scotland 2009.

10-minute clips of the programme are used as fillers on STV.

== Presenters ==
| Presenter | Subject |
|---|---|
| Alastair Campbell | bagpipes |
| David Hayman | Whisky |
| Ronnie Corbett | golf |
| Lorraine Kelly | inventors |
| Charles Kennedy | engineering |
| Sanjeev Kohli | Irn Bru |
| Aggie MacKenzie | shortbread |
| Kathleen McDermot | redhead |
| Alex Norton | Robert Burns |
| Kirsty Wark | haggis |
