= Toyboize =

- Origin: England

Toyboize is a British web series documenting the comeback of a fictional boy band. The comedy series is produced by the television company talkbackTHAMES, a division of FremantleMedia (part of the RTL Group)

== Back story ==
The Toyboize, a boy band, were formed in February 1988 by Scottish pop svengali Rab Morrison who came up with the idea whilst on holiday in Sri Lanka. Hot on the heels of his brief success with short-lived Glaswegian trio 'Boys Next Door', Morrison had an inkling that the world was ready for a talented child pop act. After appearing as a judge on TV's New Faces he recruited 12-year-old singer/songwriter duo Reece Phillips and Tim Hughes. Martin Power was spotted breakdancing on breakfast TV whilst JP Lambert and Nicky Naylor were found through a rigorous nationwide talent search. The resulting line up was christened the Toyboize. After a period of writing and rehearsal the Toyboize released their first single "Sherbert Dip" in June which struggled to make an impact but hinted at the promise of what was to come. In late October their second single "I Like U Girl" reached number 2 in the charts and it is this catchy pop classic that most people remember them for. Their album We Like U Girl was a big smash, reaching number 3 in the charts at its peak. Never one to miss an opportunity to satisfy an adoring public, Morrison rushed a seasonal Christmas album into production (A Very Toyboize Christmas) and this LP saw them register a second chart album hit in as many months. They were unable to replicate such levels of success in 1989 as they struggled to compete with Bros and New Kids On The Block. Most of the group knew they had outgrown their roles as child stars and felt it would be best to call it a day. The group were pleased, however, that Reece had decided to stick at the music and have watched on with delight as he has carved himself a career as an international pop star. Almost 20 years on, with the public clamouring for an encore, the other four Toyboize have decided to step back into the spotlight. Reece decided not to reunite with the other members for the 20th anniversary celebratory tour and events which was a minor blow to the remaining Boize.

== Production and reception ==
The series is a sequence of episodes and diary clips that were initially released over a six-week period in May–June 2008. Additional videos were added in 2009 and 2010. The title music "I Like U Girl" was co-written and recorded by Ricky Gervais. The series also features actors from The Office including Stirling Gallacher and Ewen Macintosh. Primarily hosted on the Toyboize YouTube channel, Toyboize has been acquired by the UKTV network to play exclusively on its entertainment TV channel, Dave from Monday 9 March 2009. This was the first time that an online originated comedy series has been picked up by a broadcaster in the UK and comes off the back of the huge success of the comedy series on YouTube. To date, Toyboize has had over one million views since it launched on YouTube. The series was also made an official content provider by the editorial panel at DailyMotion C21TV have published a video interview with some of the Toyboize creators talking about the series. In 2009, the series was nominated for a BAFTA Craft Award in the Interactive Creative Contribution category. Toyboize was created by the comedy group Navelgazing, who are Jack Brough, Jamie Deeks, Dan Johnston and Ewen Macintosh.

== Press and blogs ==
The project's launch was initially reported in UK TV industry trade publication Broadcast and also on Chortle, a UK based comedy news site.

Blogging sources:

- VideoGum
- Next Thing
- Videosift
- C21TV video interview with Toyboize creators:
