= Empire of Cricket =

- Genre: Sports; Documentary
- Country of origin: United Kingdom
- Original language: English
- No. of seasons: 1
- No. of episodes: 4

Production
- Running time: 60 minutes

Original release
- Network: BBC
- Release: July 6 – July 28, 2009

Empire of Cricket is a 2009 television series produced by the BBC. The series features four episodes profiling the histories of four leading Test cricketing nations: England, the West Indies, Australia, and India. Each episode is approximately one hour and features some of the most well-known incidents in cricket, including references to the Bodyline series, the Chappell underarm bowling incident of 1981, and the West Indies cricket team's first win at Lord's cricket ground.
