= The Lost World of Communism =

- Country of origin: United Kingdom
- Original language: English

Production
- Producers: Peter Molloy; Lucy Hetherington
- Running time: 60 min (3 parts)

Original release
- Release: 14 March 2009

The Lost World of Communism is a three-part British documentary series which examines the legacy of communism twenty years on from the fall of the Berlin Wall. Produced by Peter Molloy and Lucy Hetherington, the series takes a retrospective look at life behind the Iron Curtain between 1945 and 1989, focusing on three countries in the Eastern Bloc - East Germany, Czechoslovakia and Romania. Through film and television footage and the personal recollections of those who lived in these countries, the series offers a glimpse of what daily life was like during the years of Communist rule.

The Lost World of Communism debuted on BBC Two on Saturday 14 March 2009 at 9:00pm. There is also a book which accompanies the series.

== Episode list ==
Date	Number	Title	Details
14 March	1	A Socialist Paradise	How the collapse of communism affected people in the 'socialist paradise' of East Germany.
21 March	2	The Kingdom of Forgetting	In communist Czechoslovakia, attempts to reform communism were crushed by Warsaw Pact allies in 1968.
28 March	3	Socialism in One Family	Looking at communist Romania and Nicolae and Elena Ceaușescu.
