= The City Uncovered with Evan Davis =

- Title card
- Also known as: The City Uncovered
- Genre: Factual, finance
- Written by: Evan Davis
- Directed by: Andy Webb
- Presented by: Evan Davis
- Composer: Mike Roberts
- Country of origin: United Kingdom
- Original language: English
- No. of series: 1
- No. of episodes: 3 (list of episodes)

Production
- Executive producer: Lucy Hetherington
- Producers: Steven Duke; Samuel Goss; Joanna Potts; Simon Finch; Andy Webb
- Production locations: London; New York City; Gosforth, Newcastle upon Tyne
- Editor: Simon Thorne
- Running time: 1 hour
- Production company: BBC Productions

Original release
- Network: BBC Two
- Release: 14 January – 28 January 2009

The City Uncovered with Evan Davis is a 2009 British documentary series.

== Background ==
The City Uncovered deals with the history of finance, and the events of the 2008 financial crisis. The three-part BBC series, presented by journalist Evan Davis, was a part of the "City Season" programming on the BBC. It aired on BBC 2 in the UK at 9 pm on Wednesday evenings between 14 and 28 January 2009. The episodes were shown again on BBC One days later. The title is a reference to the common name of the financial areas of London, known as The City, which is similar to places such as Wall Street in New York City.

== Episode list ==
Episode number	Title	Content	Original air date
1	"Banks and How to Break Them"	Davis examines a brief history of banking and how banks are meant to work, and then discusses the chain of events which led to the downfall of Lehman Brothers in the US and Northern Rock in the UK.	14 January 2009
2	"Tricks with Risk"	Davis examines risk management, derivatives, and how hedge funds are able to make money, if the markets go up, or down.	21 January 2009
3	"When Markets Go Mad"	Davis examines the beginnings of the current credit crisis including the bubble in property prices, and how prices can be set in the global financial markets.	28 January 2009
