= Inside Life =

- DVD cover
- Genre: Nature documentary Children's television
- Narrated by: Barney Harwood
- Country of origin: United Kingdom
- Original language: English
- No. of episodes: 10

Production
- Executive producer: Wendy Darke
- Producers: Scott Alexander; Doug MacKay-Hope; Vanessa Coates
- Running time: 30 minutes
- Production company: BBC Natural History Unit

Original release
- Network: CBBC
- Release: 13 October – 15 December 2009

Related
- Life

Inside Life is a BBC nature documentary series for children's television which aired on the CBBC Channel in autumn 2009. It is a companion to the BBC Natural History Unit's series, Life, which looks at the extraordinary lengths to which animals and plants go in order to survive and reproduce. The aim of Inside Life is to present this information in a way that is simple for children to understand. Each of the ten Inside Life programmes follows a lucky child as they accompany the Life filmmakers on expeditions around the world with the aim of capturing groundbreaking wildlife footage. The series is aimed at 7-9 year olds.

In each 30-minute programme, the presenter (called an Inside Life "agent") first sets out on a fact-finding assignment in the UK to discover more about the animal they will be filming, before joining the Natural History Unit's expedition team to try to film the species in the wild.

A hardback book, Inside Life by Doug Hope and Vanessa Coates was published 2 October 2009 to accompany the series. It is presented in the style of a scrapbook and gives an insight into the programme's creation, as well as providing educational material about the animals featured in the series.

A 2-disc DVD box set of the television series was released by 2Entertain on 30 November 2009.

== Episodes ==
No.	Title	Directed by	Original release date
1	"Polar Bears"	Vanessa Coates	13 October 2009
Louise is sent to the freezing state of Alaska to help film some wild polar bears.
2	"Komodo Dragons"	Doug Mackay-Hope	20 October 2009
Isobel travels to Komodo to help the Life team film the Komodo dragon.
3	"Gibbons"	Vanessa Coates	27 October 2009
Bryony scales dizzying heights to help the Life team film gibbons in the treetops of Thailand.
4	"Garter Snakes"	Scott Alexander	3 November 2009
Matthew travels to Canada to get up close and personal with garter snakes.
5	"Frigate Birds"	Jerry Short	10 November 2009
Gregory takes to the skies as he assists the Life in filming frigate birds.
6	"Fish Frenzy"	TBC	17 November 2009
Sam heads to Patagonia in hope of filming a huge underwater bait ball.
7	"Tigers"	TBC	24 November 2009
Scarlett travels to India to film tigers and to find out just how alive the rainforest really is.
8	"Rock Climbing Fish"	TBC	1 December 2009
Jacob heads to Hawaii to capture some footage of the waterfall climbing Gobies.
9	"Bahamas Reef"	TBC	8 December 2009
James dives down in the Bahamas to see just what it takes to create a coral reef.
10	"Madagascar Lemurs"	TBC	15 December 2009
Billy flies to Madagascar to help the Life film the ring tailed lemurs.
