= Rocket Science (TV series) =

- Starring: Andy Smith
- Country of origin: United Kingdom
- No. of series: 1
- No. of episodes: 3

Production
- Producers: Andy Robbins; Roy Ackerman; Judith Bunting
- Running time: 60 minutes

Original release
- Network: BBC Two
- Release: 6 March – 20 March 2009

Rocket Science is a BBC television documentary series, first broadcast in March 2009 on BBC Two, exploring new ways to teach science to children. The series follows a group of second-year students as they learn about the science of fireworks and build their own fireworks display, under the auspices of physics teacher Andy Smith.

== Episodes ==
| # | Title | Subject | Airdate |
|---|---|---|---|
| 1 | Episode 1 | Andy Smith tries to convert his pupils to physics and chemistry. | 6 March 2009 |
| 2 | Episode 2 | The class go on field trips to Nevada and Scotland to find out how fireworks are made. | 13 March 2009 |
| 3 | Episode 3 | The class visit China to see how fireworks are made, and help to design a fireworks display for Liverpool's European Capital of Culture celebrations. | 20 March 2009 |

Andy Smith won the secondary school teacher of the year for the north west region in 2005. He has also filmed shows for the digital channel Teacher's TV. He is a big Doctor Who fan and has assisted in many conventions in which previous stars of the series attend, notably the Who in the Cavern, which raises money for the Liverpool children's hospital Alder Hey. He once famously presided over a quiz between fifth doctor Peter Davison and sixth doctor Colin Baker.
