= Simply Movies =

- Country: UK
- Broadcast area: UK

Programming
- Picture format: SDTV

Ownership
- Owner: Simply Media Ltd

History
- Launched: 24 November 2008
- Replaced: The Baby Channel
- Closed: 15 June 2009

Links
- Website: simplymovies.co.uk

Simply Movies was a movie television channel broadcast in the United Kingdom, on the Sky Digital and Freesat platforms.

The channel aired British and American films from the 1930s through to the 1970s, and claimed to be for fans of (often forgotten) classic movies. The channel broadcast 24 hours a day, 7 days a week.

The Simply Movies channel was formed as an offshoot of Simply Media's Simply Home Entertainment mail order company. Simply Home Entertainment offers classic movie DVDs to the public, and the service is heavily promoted on the Simply Movies channel, and its website.

The channel closed on 15 June 2009, a statement on the website read, "Unfortunately, as of the 15th of June 2009, Simply Movies will no longer be broadcast as we need to focus on our programme production and distribution. All of us here at Simply Movies would like to thank our valued viewers who have supported the channel since launch - the magic lives on at Simply Home Entertainment, where many of these movies shown and other classics are available to buy."
