= The Rat Pack (TV series) =

British television series

The Rat Pack is a British six-part documentary, shown on BBC One, about the daily life of pest controllers in London, England. The show ran for 6 weeks from 23 July 2009 to 20 August 2009.

== Background ==
Environ Pest Control were contacted by Fever Media with the intention of making a programme about pest control in London. The concept for The Rat Pack was developed by Simon Draper, the producer, who would follow pest controllers in their daily duties as they dealt with London's pests and vermin.

== Reviews ==
The Rat Pack received mixed reviews, with Sam Wollaston of The Guardian suggesting that Charlie, the pest control team's dog, be put down to save himself the embarrassment of future episodes.
