= BTV =

BTV may refer to:

== Television channels, stations and networks ==
=== Bangladesh ===
- Bangladesh Television, a state-owned TV broadcaster in Bangladesh and country's oldest television network

=== Botswana ===
- Botswana Television, national broadcaster in Botswana
  - Botswana TV 1, targeted for adults. Normally airs government issues like National Development Plans (NDPs), economics, etc.
  - Botswana TV 3 focuses on tourism, cultural shows etc.

=== Bulgaria ===
- bTV (Bulgaria), a major national television channel in Bulgaria
  - bTV Story (Formerly bTV Lady), a Bulgarian television channel targeted at a female audience
  - bTV Action, a Bulgarian action show television channel
  - bTV Cinema, a Bulgarian television channel, showing movies and serials
  - bTV Comedy, a Bulgarian television channel featuring comedy programs

=== United States ===
- Bloomberg Television (BTV), a business news channel
- Binghamton Television, the student television station of Binghamton University, Vestal, New York

=== Other television networks/channels/stations, by country ===
- BTV, the former callsign of VTV a TV station in Ballarat in Victoria, which is a state of Australia
- BTV, the former callsign of Betevé a local television channel in Barcelona.
- Beijing Television, a series of channels in China
- Bloomsbury Television, the student television channel of University College London, England
- BTV (Indonesia), a television network in Indonesia
- BTV (Lithuanian TV channel), a television station in Lithuania
- Bolivia TV, a television channel in Bolivia
- BTV, a television station in Mongolia
- BTV, known as Birgunj Television Channel, Nepal
- Bergens Tidende TV, a local television station in Norway
- Basketball TV, a Philippine all-basketball channel
- Benfica TV, the television channel of sports club S.L. Benfica in Portugal
- Bell Television, the television channel in Ad-Dar al-Bayda

== Other uses ==
- Basic Transportation Vehicle, or Basic Utility Vehicle (BUV), a low-cost vehicle intended for developing countries
- Bluetongue virus, that causes the Bluetongue disease
- BlogTV, a now defunct live broadcasting website
- Brake to Vacate, an aircraft landing device introduced by Airbus
- BTV Cup, Binh Duong Television Cup, an international friendly football cup held in Vietnam
- Burlington International Airport in Vermont, United States (IATA code)
