= List of radio stations in Bulgaria =

This is a list of radio stations in Bulgaria.

== State-owned ==
=== Bulgarian National Radio (BNR) ===
==== National services ====
Station	Frequency (MHz)	Format
Horizont	See full frequency list	News, current affairs and music
Hristo Botev Radio	See full frequency list	Documentaries, drama, classical music, jazz and programming for children
Radio Bulgaria	Online (shortwave service ended in 2012)	News and cultural programming in Bulgarian and also in Albanian, Romanian, English, French, German, Greek, Russian, Spanish, Serbian and Turkish.

==== Regional services ====
- Radio Blagoevgrad (1973–)
- Radio Burgas (2012–)
- Radio Kardzhali (2016–)
- Radio Plovdiv (1955–)
- Radio Shumen (1973–)
- Radio Sofia (1962–1998, 2007–)
- Radio Stara Zagora (1936–)
- Radio Varna (1934–)
- Radio Vidin (2009–)

== Private ==
- Bulgaria on air
- BG Radio - Bulgarian music only
- City Radio - new music.
- Classic FM
- Darik Radio - news radio
- Magic FM - soft ac
- FM+ first private radio in Bulgaria.
- Focus
- Fresh - popular radio - Today's Hits!
- Veronica - Bulgarian pop-folk and balkan music
- Jazz FM
- Melody Radio - songs from 70's, 80's, 90's and few new songs
- Nova News
- NRJ - songs from 90's and new music
- N-JOY
- bTV Radio
- Radio 1 - oldies music from 70's, 80's and 90's and a few new songs.
- Radio Nova - house music
- Radio Vitosha -mainly new songs and a few songs from the 90's
- Radio 1 Rock rock music from 80's and 90's
- The Voice - new music
- Veselina - Bulgarian and Balkan (mostly Greek, Serbian, Croatian) pop-folk music and sometimes dance music
- Z-Rock
- Новините сега - news radio without music
- Autoradio - new pop and dance music
