= Balkan News Corporation =

Balkan News Corporation was a Bulgarian media company, which operated the bTV and Fox International Channels for Bulgaria. It was formerly owned by News Corporation. In April 2010 the bTV channel was bought by Central European Media Enterprises, who owned the channels PRO.BG and RING.BG in Bulgaria. The FOX channels in Bulgaria (Fox Life and Fox Crime) continue to air under the company brand of "FOX Intl. Channels BG", again owned by News Corporation.

Since 2011 bTV airs under the brand "bTV Media Group", containing the channels bTV, bTV Comedy, bTV Cinema, bTV Action (the former PRO.BG), bTV Lady (from January 2012) and RING.BG. The brand is owned by Central European Media Enterprises.
