= BTV Radio =

bTV Radio
- Bulgaria
- Frequencies: Sofia – 101.1 MHz; Burgas – 98.3 MHz

Programming
- Language: Bulgarian
- Format: Music

Ownership
- Owner: CME Enterprises
- Sister stations: N-JOY; Jazz FM; Classic FM

History
- Founded: 3 October 2011
- Former names: PRO.FM (2009–2011)

Links
- Website: www.btv.bg/radio

bTV Radio is a Bulgarian radio station, part of bTV Radio Group, owned by the Central European Media Enterprises (owned by WarnerMedia/AT&T). It started broadcasting on May 1, 2009, in Sofia, and later launched in Pernik and Gotse Delchev. Its program is also transmitted via satellite across Europe. The station was originally launched as a radio program of the television station PRO.BG - PRO.FM. In October 2011, it was re-branded as the eponymous radio station of the television channel bTV, transmitting much of the television output. The radio broadcasts exclusively in Sofia.

== Logos history ==
PRO.FM logo used 2009–2011

bTV Radio logo used until 2021

bTV Radio logo used 2021–present
