= Dilyana Popova =

Bulgarian actress and model

- Born: 24 September 1981 (age 45); Gulyantsi, Bulgaria
- Occupation: Actress
- Spouse: Asen Blatechki (m. 2014)
- Children: 1

Dilyana Popova (Bulgarian: Диляна Попова; born 24 September 1981) is a Bulgarian actress and model.

== Biography ==
Born in Gulyantsi, she lived there until grade 8 when she relocated to Pleven. Popova subsequently studied modelling design at New Bulgarian University.

In 2010, she was photographed for the Bulgarian version of Playboy magazine. Popova has appeared in the film Love.net, the film series Glass Home and also had a role in the drama and romantic series Revolutcia Z. In 2014, she officialized her relationship with fellow actor Asen Blatechki, with whom she has a son named Boril.

== Filmography ==
- 2008: Train as The Pale Girl
- 2011: Velika Bulgaria as Actress
- 2011: Love.net as Niki
- 2011: Glass Home as Albena
- 2012: One More Dream as Dilyana
- 2012: Joy and Sorrow of the Body as Julia
- 2012: Revolution Z as Marnova
- 2017: Sex Academy: Men as Radina
- 2017: Malice as Marissa
- 2018: Revolution X: The Movie as Marinova
- 2018: Death Race: Beyond Anarchy as Dead Girl
- 2019: Bad Girl as Actress
- 2019: The Closet as Zhenata v byalo
- 2019: Reunion as Lora
- 2020: The Rest is Ashes as Actress
- 2022: Reunion 2 as Lora
- 2023: Tcherga as Elena
- 2023: Chalga as Stage Host
- 2023: Picasso Affair as Maria
- 2025: Flesh as Ivon
- 2025: Birthday as Sabeva
