= Classic FM (Bulgaria) =

Sofia; Bulgaria
- Broadcast area: Bulgaria - Regional FM
- Frequency: Sofia - 88.00 MHz

Programming
- Language: Bulgarian
- Format: Classical music

Ownership
- Owner: bTV Media Group

History
- First air date: 14 December 1994
- Former names: Radio Alma Mater - Classic FM

Links
- Webcast: http://193.108.24.6:8000/classica
- Website: http://www.classicfm.bg

Radio Classic FM, also known as "Alma Mater ClassicA" (Алма Матер КласикА) is a Bulgarian radio station which focuses on classical music. It is broadcast from Radio relay and television station "Sofia" on a frequency of 88 MHz.

It is owned by BTV Media Group.

== Ownership ==
Classic FM is part of the bTV Radio Group, which includes four other radio stations - N-JOY, bTV Radio, Jazz FM and Z-Rock

bTV Radio Group is part of bTV Media Group. bTV Media Group is part of the Central European Media Enterprises (CME) family, which is owned by the international company PPF Group.

== History ==
Classic FM started broadcasting on 19 December 1994, thus becoming the first classical radio station in Bulgaria. It is also the oldest radio oldest radio station owned by BTV Media Group.

Since September 5, 2006, Radio "Alma Mater" broadcast a joint program with Classic FM under the name of "Radio Alma Mater - Classic FM". Since the first of January, 2023, the name of the program broadcast on 88.0 MHz was changed to "Alma Mater ClassicA".
