= N-Joy =

N-Joy may refer to:

- N-Joy (Bulgarian radio station)
- N-Joy (German radio station)
