= Kora Khargi, Sitamarhi =

Village in India

Coordinates: 26.4825°N 85.3785°E

Kora Khargi is a small village in the Parsauni tehsil, Sitamarhi district, Bihar state, India. It is located about 22 km southwest of Sitamarhi, 27 km west by southwest of Parsauni, 130 km north of Patna, 3 km east of the Bagmati River, and 30 km south of the Nepal border.

According to the 2011 census, it had 486 households with 2085 inhabitants (including 465 children 0–6), and a literacy level of 52%.
