= Birgunj =

Metropolitan City in Madhesh Province, Nepal

Birgunj वीरगञ्ज Gateway of Nepal
- Metropolitan City
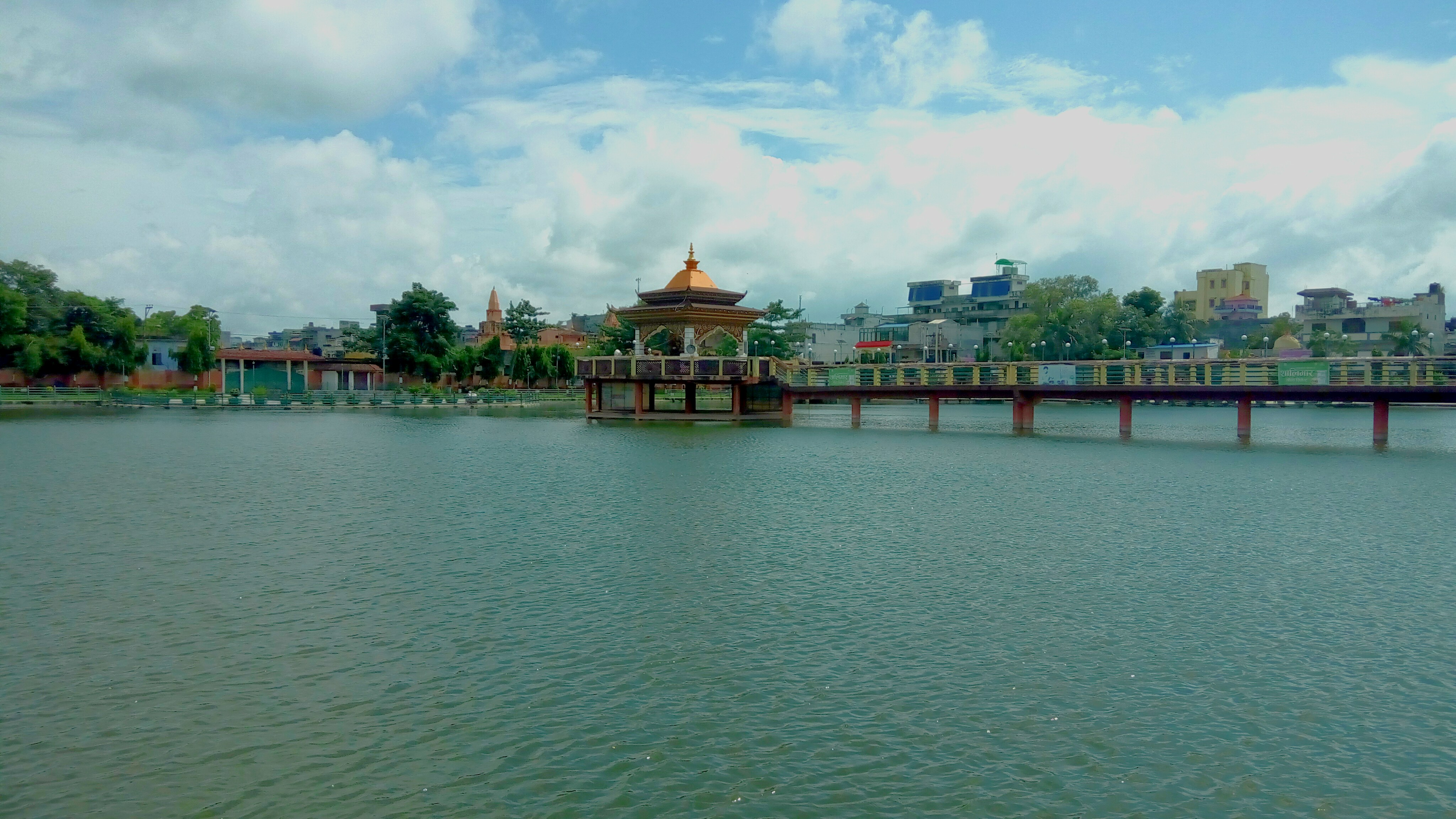
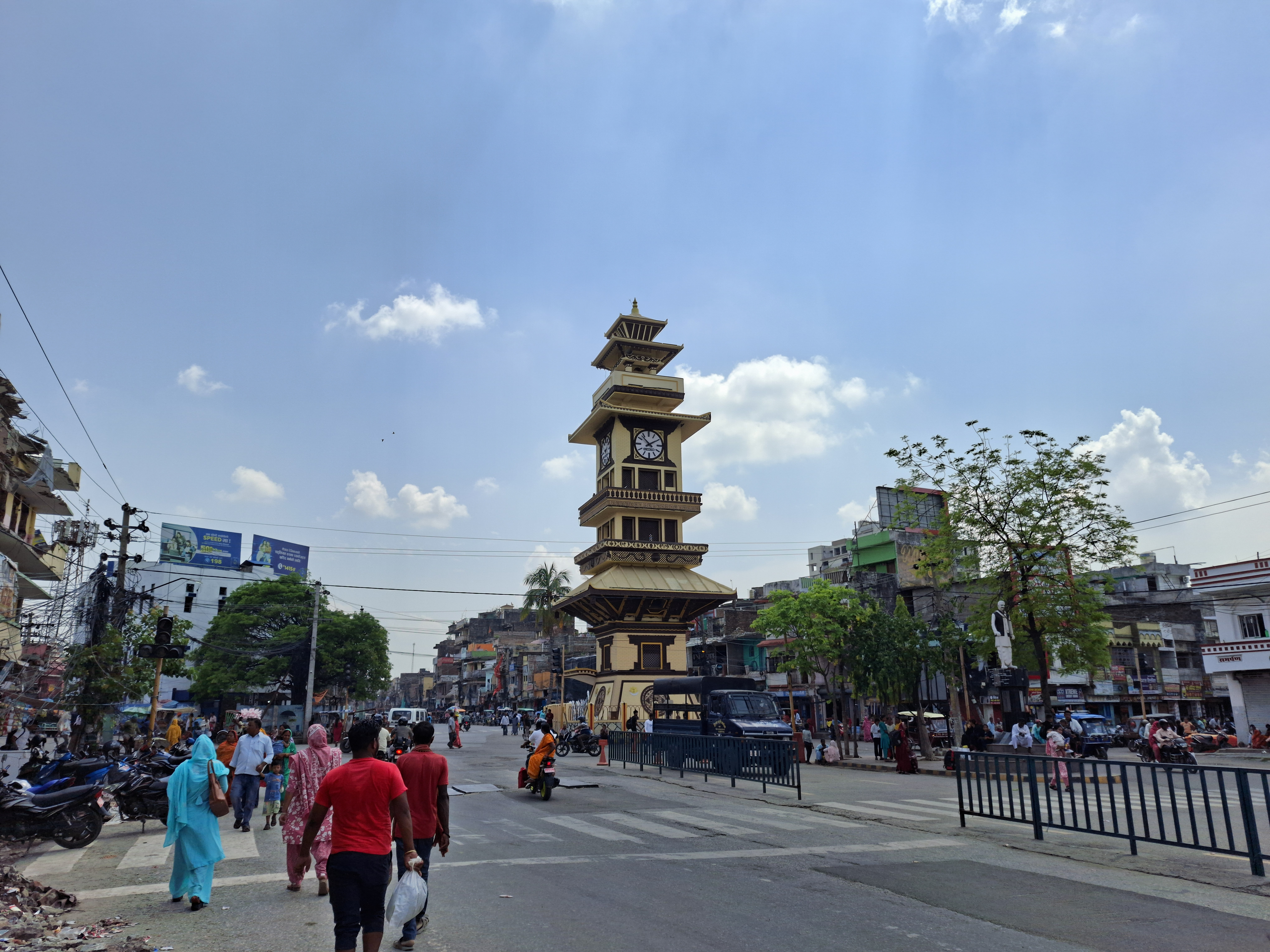
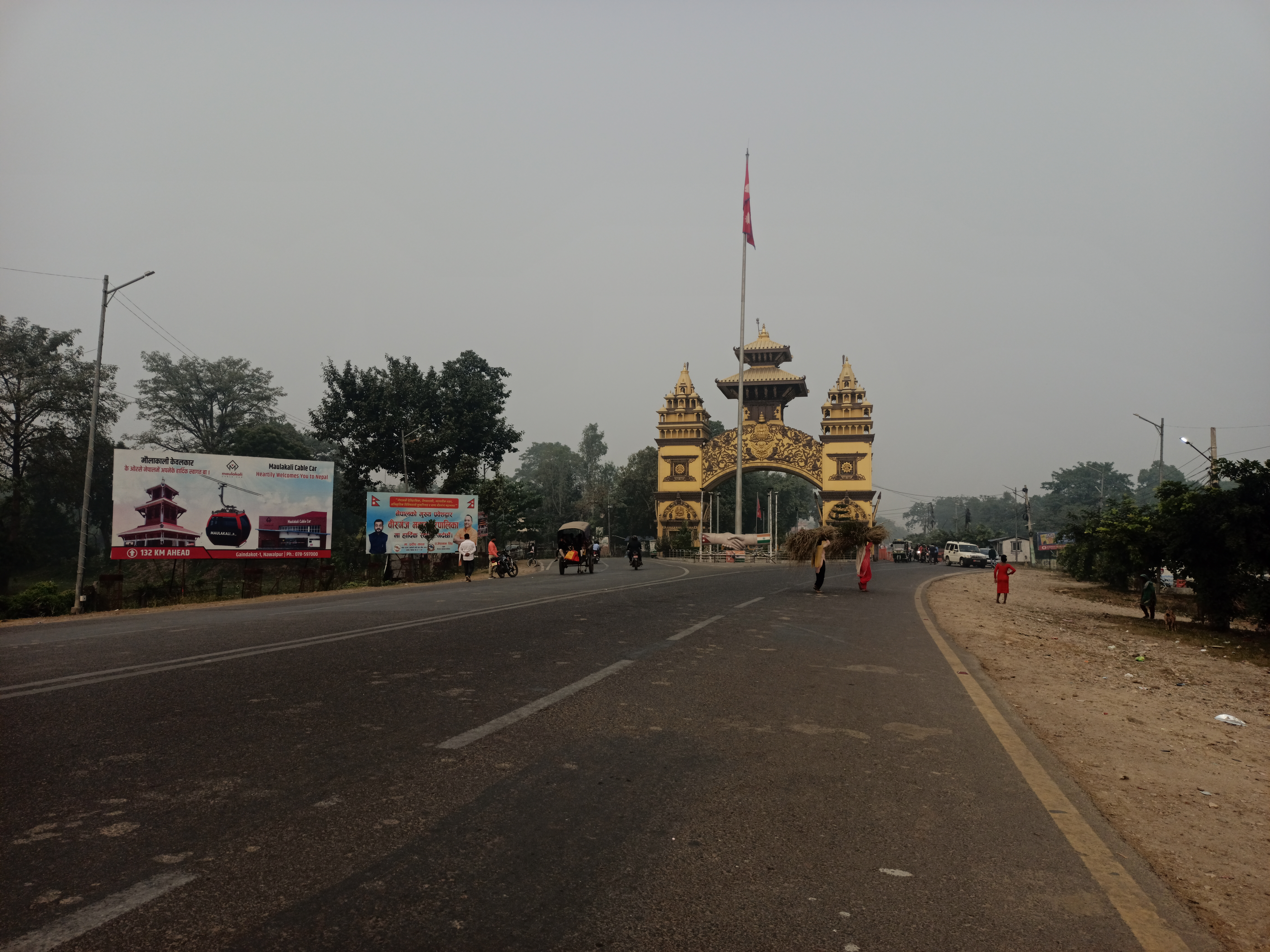
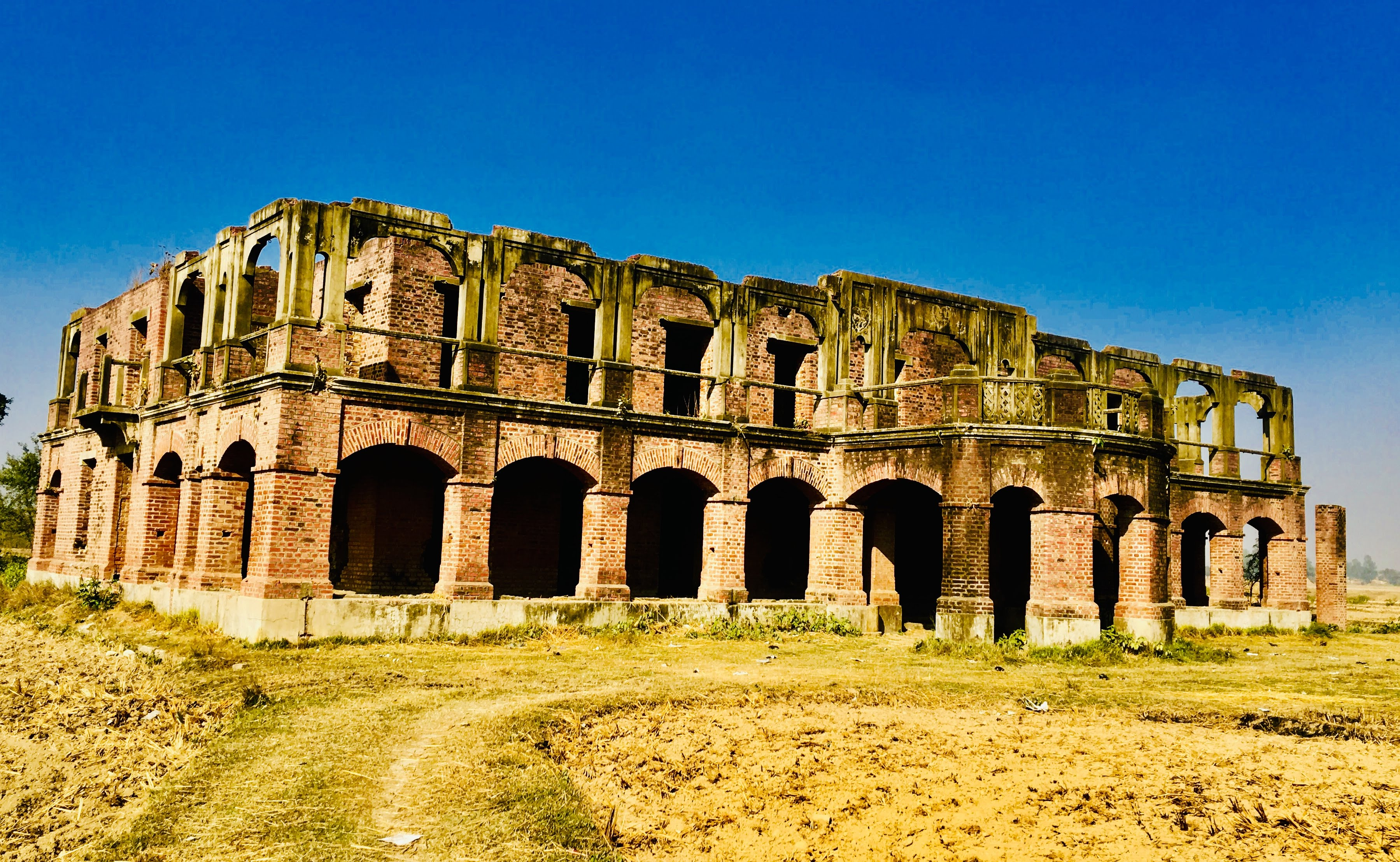
- Ghadiarwa Pokhari Ghantaghar Shankharacharya Gate Palace of Birgunj Birgunj Customs Office (ICP)
- Nickname: Commercial Capital of Nepal
- Interactive map of Birgunj
- Location of Birgunj in Madhesh Province Birgunj (Nepal)
- Coordinates: 27°0′N 84°52′E
- Country: Nepal
- Province: Madhesh
- District: Parsa
- Founded: 1897
- Founder: Bir Shamsher JBR

Government
  - Type: Local Level Government
  - Mayor: Rajesh Man Singh
  - Deputy Mayor: Imtiyaj Alam
  - Chief Administrative Officer: Deepak Bohora

Area
  - Total: 75.24 km^{2} (29.05 sq mi)

Dimensions
  - Length: 19 km (12 mi)
  - Width: 4 km (2.5 mi)
- Elevation: 92 m (302 ft)

Population (2021)
  - Total: 268,273
  - Rank: 5th largest
  - Density: 3,566/km^{2} (9,235/sq mi)
- Demonym: Birgunj

Languages
  - Official: Nepali
  - Native: Bhojpuri
- Time zone: UTC+5:45 (NST)
- Postal code: 44300, 44301
- Area code: 51
- Website: birgunjmun.gov.np

Birgunj (Nepali: वीरगञ्ज) is a metropolitan city in Parsa District in Madhesh Province in southern Nepal. It lies 135 km (84 mi) south of the capital Kathmandu, attached in the north to Raxaul on the border of the Indian state of Bihar. As an entry point to Nepal from India via Patna, Birgunj is known as the "Gateway of Nepal". It is also called the "Commercial Capital of Nepal". The town has significant economic importance for Nepal as most of the nation's trade with India is via Birgunj and the Indian town of Raxaul. The Tribhuvan Highway links Birgunj to Nepal's capital, Kathmandu.

Birgunj was one of the first three municipalities formed during the rule of Prime Minister Mohan Shumsher Jang Bahadur Rana. Birgunj was established as a conglomerate of several villages in and around Gahawa Mai Temple, which remains the epicentre of the town. It was declared a Metropolitan City on 22 May 2017 along with Biratnagar and Pokhara. Birgunj is one of the largest cities in Nepal and the largest in Madhesh Province. Birgunj is the fifth most populated metropolis of the nation.

== Etymology ==
The settlement was named after Rana Prime Minister Bir Shamsher.

== History ==
=== Ancient ===
The earliest human activity in Birgunj is thought to be a settlement around Bhiswa stupa. The Buddhist shrine is yet to be dated by archaeologists, however preliminary investigations have estimated the stupa to be around 1500 years old.

Before the establishment of Birgunj, the main centre of Parsa district was Alau, Nepal, near Dryport.

The ancient name of Birgunj was Gahawa. It was changed to Birgunj in 1897 by 11th Rana Prime Minister of Nepal Bir Shamsher Jang Bahadur Rana. Before the establishment of Birgunj Bazar, the surrounding villages of Bagahi, Alau, Barewa, Kalaiya, Parsauni, Inaruwa, and Chhapkaiya existed. To establish Birgunj Bazar in a forest covered area, Bir Shamsher Jang Bahadur Rana appointed brothers Siddhvir Mathema and Dhadjavir Mathema as the rulers of Mal Ada and Kath Mal Ada. Siddhvir Mathema distributed free land and timber and provided cash assistance to the homeowners in Birgunj. The act subsequently required Siddhvir Mathema to pay the death penalty.

After the death of Bir Shamsher Jang Bahadur Rana, Dev Shamsher Jang Bahadur Rana became Prime Minister, but within three months Chandra Shumsher Jang Bahadur Rana had driven Dev Shamsher and made himself Prime Minister. The people of Late Bir Shamsher Rana and Dev Shamsher Rana did not tolerate Chandra Shamsher Rana. Bir Shamsher Jang Bahadur Rana's special man Siddhivir Mathema, was accused of conducting an inspection of a reservoir treaty and carrying out three lakh irregularities on his forehead. When Siddhivir showed the calculations he had spent on setting up Birgunj Bazar, he was declared invalid and an order was issued to pay the money immediately. After answering that he could not pay for what he did, As a punishment, the signboard was stuck on his chest and he move it around the market. The verbal verdict of the death sentence was to cut off and kill. After hearing about the verbal death sentence given to Mathema who worked day and night to establish Birgunj Bazar, Late Bir Shamsher Jang Bahadur Rana's wife has paid 3 lakh and rescued Mathema from the death penalty.

Chandra Shamsher also wanted to displace Birgunj Bazar, which his brother had established. He wanted to remove the Birgunj bazaar from there and set it in Rautahat. According to the move to displace the market, In 1959, it raided the main market from Raxaul to Birgunj and extended the rail line service to Amlekhganj. From the link, the train used to run around the houses, exploding and terrorizing the residents. Later, the rail link was moved to the east of the market (outside the market). The Raxaul city in India, which is currently connected to Birgunj as the main gateway to Nepal, was not established. At that time Indian trains operated only till Sugauli.

=== Modern ===
On 18 May 2006, the parliament of Nepal declared that the country would become a secular state, prompting the 2006 Birgunj unrest. Birgunj was the main centre from where Madhes movement started twice both in 2007 and 2013.

32 Wards of Birgunj

== Geography ==
=== Topography, geology and soils ===
Birgunj is located in the Terai plain which is the northern part of the Indo-Gangetic plain. Birgunj metropolitan city has an elongated shape. The variation in altitude is in the range of 78 m to 95 m when moving from south to north of Birgunj. Although the range of altitude variation is small, but there is a high micro-topographical variation. The city lies about 90 m above sea level. Quaternary sediments are mainly found in the area. Soil is very fertile that consists the mixture of clay, silt and sand.

=== Climate ===
The climatic condition is sub-tropical monsoon with a very hot and humid summer. The mean annual temperature ranges from 23.8 to 24.5 °C (74.8 to 76.1 °F). The annual rainfall ranges from about 1,300 to 2,800 mm (51 to 110 in) with an average of 1,800 mm (71 in). Majority of the precipitation occurs during June, July, August and September.

Climate data for Birgunj (Simara Airport), (1991–2020 normals, extremes 1971–2017)
Month	Jan	Feb	Mar	Apr	May	Jun	Jul	Aug	Sep	Oct	Nov	Dec	Year
Record high °C (°F)	29.6 (85.3)	34.2 (93.6)	39.2 (102.6)	41.7 (107.1)	42.2 (108.0)	42.8 (109.0)	38.8 (101.8)	39.8 (103.6)	37.0 (98.6)	36.2 (97.2)	34.2 (93.6)	30.2 (86.4)	42.8 (109.0)
Mean daily maximum °C (°F)	21.1 (70.0)	25.8 (78.4)	31.0 (87.8)	35.1 (95.2)	35.2 (95.4)	34.5 (94.1)	33.0 (91.4)	33.1 (91.6)	32.8 (91.0)	31.9 (89.4)	29.0 (84.2)	24.1 (75.4)	30.6 (87.1)
Daily mean °C (°F)	14.4 (57.9)	17.9 (64.2)	22.4 (72.3)	27.2 (81.0)	29.2 (84.6)	29.9 (85.8)	29.4 (84.9)	29.4 (84.9)	28.6 (83.5)	26.0 (78.8)	21.5 (70.7)	16.8 (62.2)	24.4 (75.9)
Mean daily minimum °C (°F)	7.7 (45.9)	9.9 (49.8)	13.8 (56.8)	19.2 (66.6)	23.2 (73.8)	25.3 (77.5)	25.7 (78.3)	25.6 (78.1)	24.4 (75.9)	20.1 (68.2)	13.9 (57.0)	9.5 (49.1)	18.2 (64.8)
Record low °C (°F)	1.0 (33.8)	1.6 (34.9)	5.2 (41.4)	9.0 (48.2)	14.0 (57.2)	19.0 (66.2)	20.6 (69.1)	20.8 (69.4)	19.0 (66.2)	10.6 (51.1)	6.0 (42.8)	3.0 (37.4)	1.0 (33.8)
Average precipitation mm (inches)	14.1 (0.56)	15.7 (0.62)	17.3 (0.68)	41.8 (1.65)	135.5 (5.33)	272.1 (10.71)	549.5 (21.63)	422.0 (16.61)	254.8 (10.03)	68.0 (2.68)	4.5 (0.18)	7.7 (0.30)	1,803 (70.98)
Average precipitation days (≥ 1.0 mm)	1.7	1.8	2.0	4.1	8.9	12.8	18.7	15.5	11.8	3.4	0.5	0.7	81.9
Source 1: Department of Hydrology and Meteorology
Source 2: World Meteorological Organization

=== Surface and ground water ===
Sirsiya River in the west and Singaha in the east are the two major rivers in Birgunj. Both rivers flow from north to south. During monsoon, these rivers are flooded and river bank cutting at the bends is common. The water level is very low in these rivers during winter. The depth of groundwater table is approximately between 9–15 m (30–49 ft) deep with 1–2 m (3 ft 3 in – 6 ft 7 in) fluctuation during wet and dry season.

== Demographics ==
According to the 2021 Census, Birgunj had a population of 268,273. It is the second biggest city in Terai and the fifth biggest city in Nepal after Kathmandu, Pokhara, Bharatpur, and Lalitpur by population. It serves as the headquarters of the Parsa District.

At the time of the 2011 Nepal census, Birgunj Metropolitan City had a population of 244,086. Of these, 78.6% spoke Bhojpuri, 6.5% Nepali, 5.5% Maithili, 3.1% Urdu, 1.9% Rajasthani, 1.5% Newar, 0.7% Tharu, 0.6% Hindi, 0.4% Rai, 0.1% Bengali, 0.1% Magar, 0.1% Punjabi, 0.1% Tamang, 0.1% Uranw/Urau, and 0.1% other parties as their first language.

In terms of ethnicity/caste, 18.1% were Musalman, 9.6% Kurmi, 6.5% Yadav, 6.4% Kanu, 3.6% Hill Brahmin, 3.6% Teli, 3.2% Dhanuk, 3.1% Sonar, 3.1% Tharu, 3.0% Kalwar, 2.9% Chamar/Harijan/Ram, 2.8% Koiri/Kushwaha, 2.3% Newar, 2.2% Marwadi, 2.1% Kathabaniyan, 2.1% Kayastha, 1.9% Chhetri, 1.9% Dusadh/Paswan/Pasi, 1.8% Terai Brahmin, 1.6% Baraee, 1.6% Mallaha, 1.4% Nuniya, 1.4% other Terai, 1.3% Rajput, 1.2% Hajjam/Thakur, 1.2% Lohar, 1.2% Tatma/Tatwa, 1.1% Dhobi, 0.9% Sanyasi/Dasnami, 0.7% Kumal, 0.7% Musahar, 0.5% Kumhar, 0.5% Rai, 0.4% Halkhor, 0.4% Tamang, 0.3% Dom, 0.3% Magar, 0.3% Mali, 0.2% Badhaee, 0.2% Bengali, 0.2% Bin, 0.2% Halwai, 0.2% Kahar, 0.2% Kewat, 0.2% Natuwa, 0.2% Rajbhar, 0.2% Thakuri, 0.1% Damai/Dholi, 0.1% Gaderi/Bhedihar, 0.1% Gurung, 0.1% Jhangad/ Dhagar, 0.1% Kami, 0.1% Majhi, 0.1% Punjabi/Sikh, 0.1% Sudhi, 0.1% Yakkha and 0.1% others.

In terms of religion, 81.1% were Hindu, 17.9% Muslim, 0.4% Buddhist, 0.1% Christian, 0.1% Kirati, 0.1% Sikh and 0.2% others.

In terms of literacy, 66.5% could read and write, 2.4% could only read and 31.0% could neither read nor write.

== Economy ==
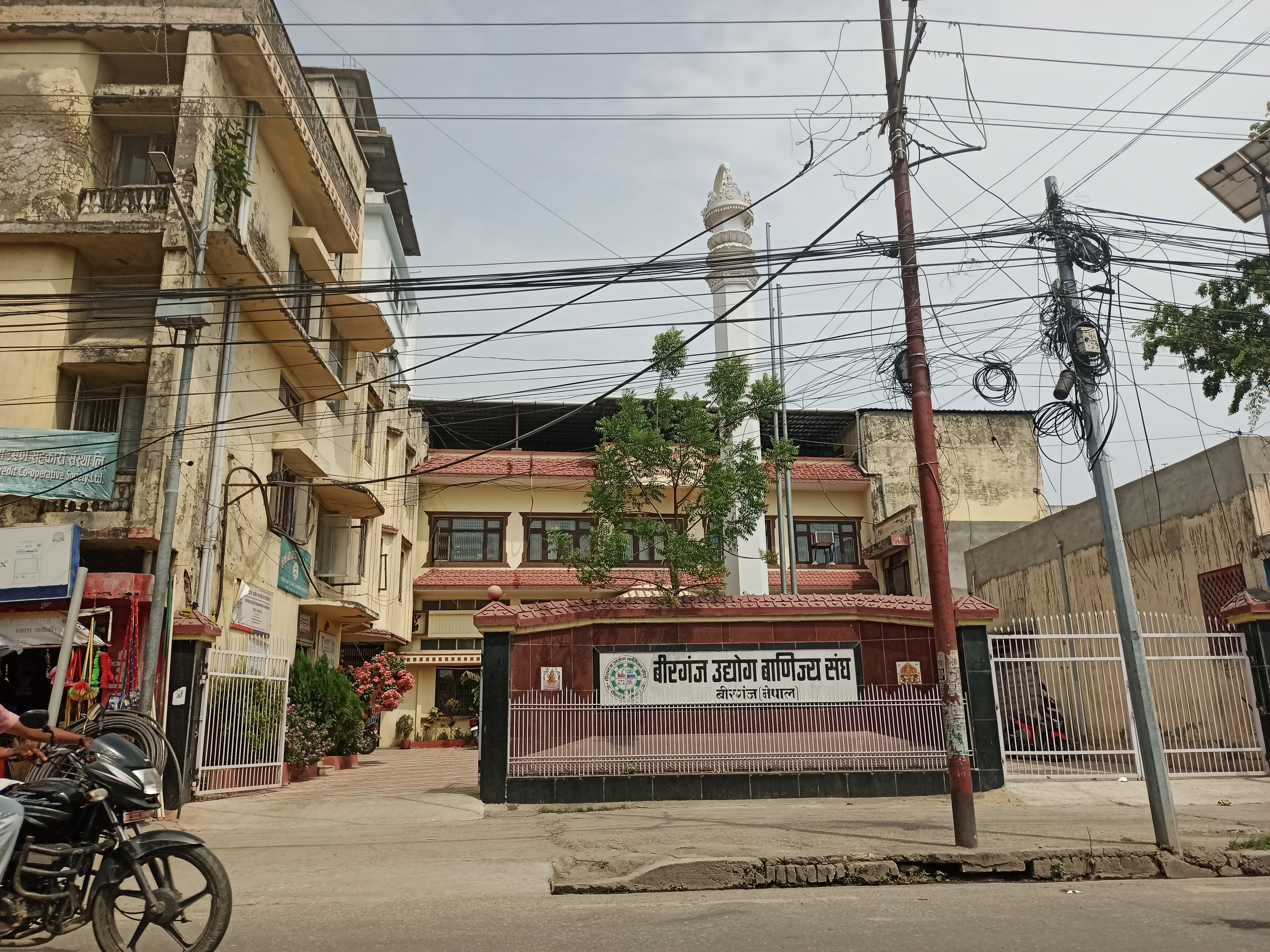
Birgunj Chamber Of Commerce & Industries

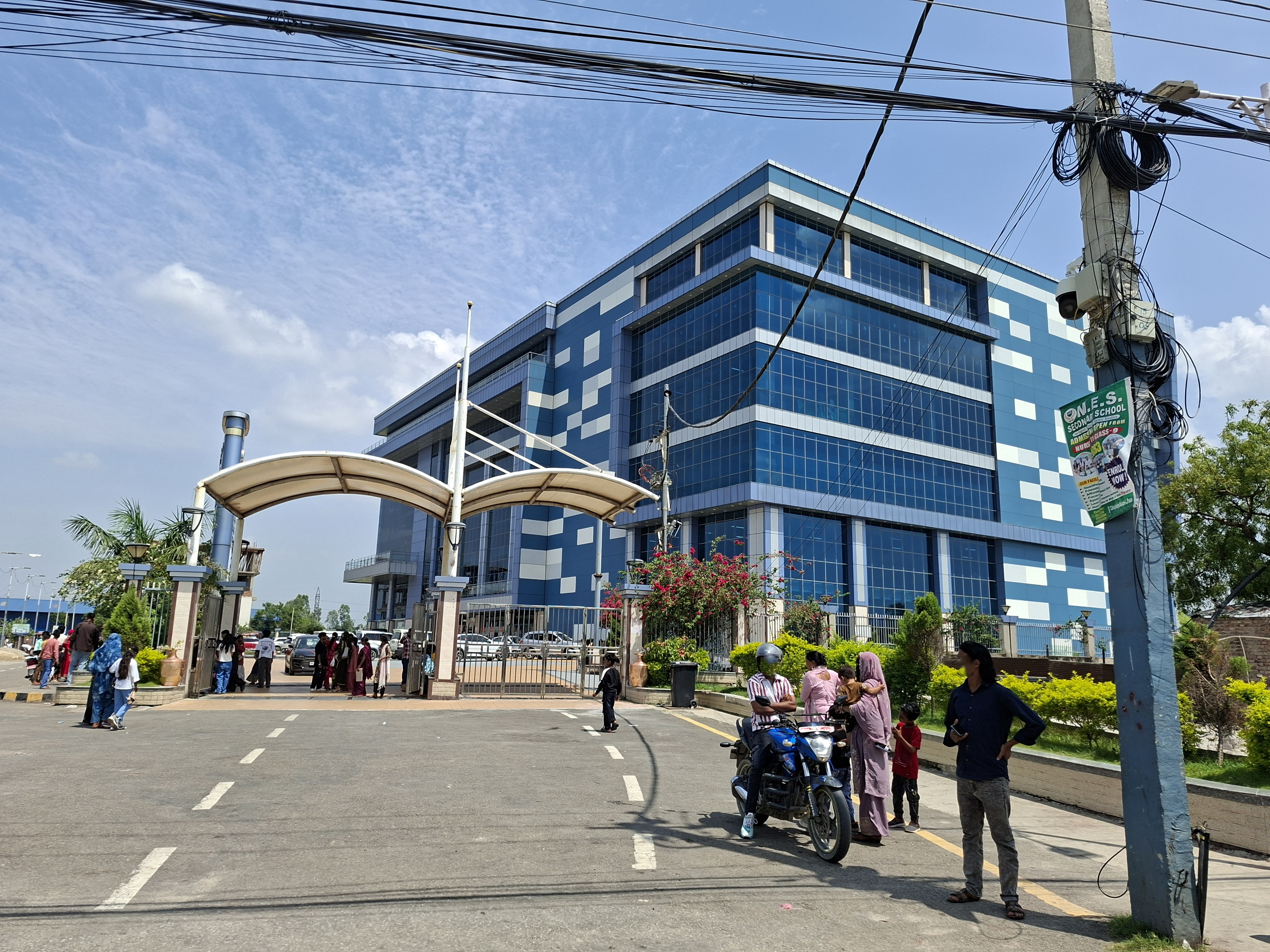
Bhatbhateni Supermarket Birgunj

Birgunj is the Industrial and Commercial Capital of Nepal. Birgunj Chamber of Commerce & Industries is the leading and the oldest Chamber of Commerce & Industries in Nepal.

In 1964 when Birgunj Sugar Factory Ltd. was established by the Government of Nepal in collaboration with the Soviet Union (at present, Russia) with initial crushing capacity of 1,000 metric tons which later increased to 1,500 metric tons (Rajak, 2006). This was the first sugar mill established in the public sector. Later on, this mill was liquidated due to heavy losses.

Birgunj is a major business centre of Nepal, especially for trade with India. Almost all trade with India occurs through this route. The Indian border town of Raxaul has become one of the busiest towns for heavy transportation due to high trade volume. With a large number of industries set on the Birgunj-Pathlaiya industrial corridor, Birgunj produces a wide range of products such as pharmaceuticals, textiles, vegetable ghee, plastic, steel, cigarettes, aluminium, among others. Almost 56% of the total products of Birgunj are exported to the Indian state of Bihar.

Birgunj Customs holds a major contribution in terms of revenue earnings in the nation. On 16 July 2004 Birgunj Inland Dry Port came in operation to improve trade operation and address the concerns in handling the large volume of goods.

The India-Nepal oil pipeline construction that began on 9 March 2018, saw its completion up to 13 km (8.1 mi). The 69-kilometre (43 mi) Amlekhgunj-Raxaul oil pipeline connecting the two countries has been laid along the Pathlaiya-Simara-Jitpur, Parwanipur and Birgunj bypass roadway. According to the reports, major part of the pipeline alignment is covered in the Birgunj-Pathlaiya commercial highway.

=== Tourism ===
Birgunj is main entry to Nepal. So, the city is widely visited by the Indians. There are good three-star hotels in the main centre of the city. These hotels operate some mini casinos as well.

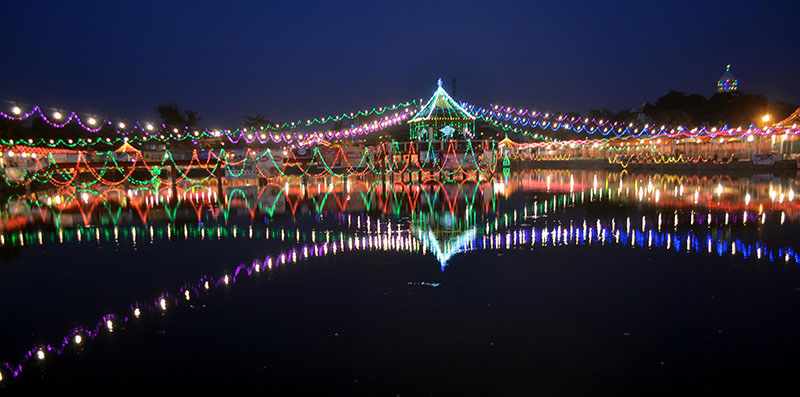
The decorative Ghadiarwa Pokhari during Chhath

During Chhath festival, Ghadiarwa Pokhari is visited by numerous people from different parts of the country. Vishwa Buddha Vihar is another religious place which is located in the out-skirts of the city. Vishwa is actually shaped like a stupa and has engravings of Buddha facing the cardinal directions of the universe. This place has a tranquil ambience and it attracts those tourists who want to flee the bustling life of the city. The term vishwa is derived from the word vicchu-wa, which is translated as a resting place for Bikshu(s) or Buddhist monks and means a resting place. In the ancient times, the pilgrims stopped at Birgunj in the midst of their journey between Lumbini and Bodh Gaya (India). The mound is protected by a boundary wall, and future excavations may well tell us about the history of not just Birgunj but also its importance to Buddhism 2,500 years ago.

Parsa National Park which is 33 km (21 mi) from the city, known for inhabiting Royal Bengal Tigers (Panthera tigris tigris), Asian elephants (Elephas maximus), One-horned Rhinoceros (Rhinoceros unicornis), Common Leopard (Panthera pardus) and also various species of mammals, birds and reptiles. The park can visited by one hour drive by bus from the city.

== Transport ==
Birgunj was built as the closest Nepalese city connecting the capital Kathmandu with India. Birgunj railway station was connected by the Nepal Government Railway (NGR) to Raxaul station in Bihar across the border with India. The 47 km (29 mi) railway extended north to Amlekhganj in Nepal. It was built in 1927 by the British but discontinued beyond Birgunj in December 1965.

=== Rail ===
Trains run to major cities of India from Raxaul Railywas station (in India, adjacent to Birgunj) and Sugauli station (17 miles from Raxaul) including the Satyagrah Express to Delhi, Mithila Express to Kolkata, Lokmanya Tilak express to Mumbai, and HYD-RXL express to Hyderabad. Thus, Birgunj has direct connectivity to major Indian cities like – Patna, Varanasi, Haridwar, Chandigarh, Dehradun, Allahabad, Kolkata, New Delhi, Mumbai, Bhopal, Amritsar, Guwahati, Lucknow, Gorakhpur, Kanpur, Mehsi, Ranchi, Raipur, Nagpur, Hyderabad, etc. The Raxaul-Birgunj-Kathmandu railway survey report has been ready and in coming future the further work will be started soon.

=== Air ===
Birgunj is served by Simara Airport, which lies 9 miles north of the city. Regular flights operate to Kathmandu & Pokhara, and . The second International Airport of Nepal is under construction at Nijgadh (22 miles from Birgunj). There are plans to connect the new airport, Birgunj and Kathmandu via a "Fast track" expressway after its completion. This is expected to reduce travel times between the capital and the commercial capital, Birgunj.

=== Buses ===
There are regular bus services to all major cities and towns in Nepal including Kathmandu, Pokhara, Patan, Bhaktapur, Biratnagar, Dharan, Butwal, Nepalgunj, Dhangadhi, Kakarvitta, Janakpur, Bhairahawa (Lumbini), Bharatpur (Chitwan), etc. Local bus services provide transportation inside the city and into its vicinity.

=== Tanga (cart) ===
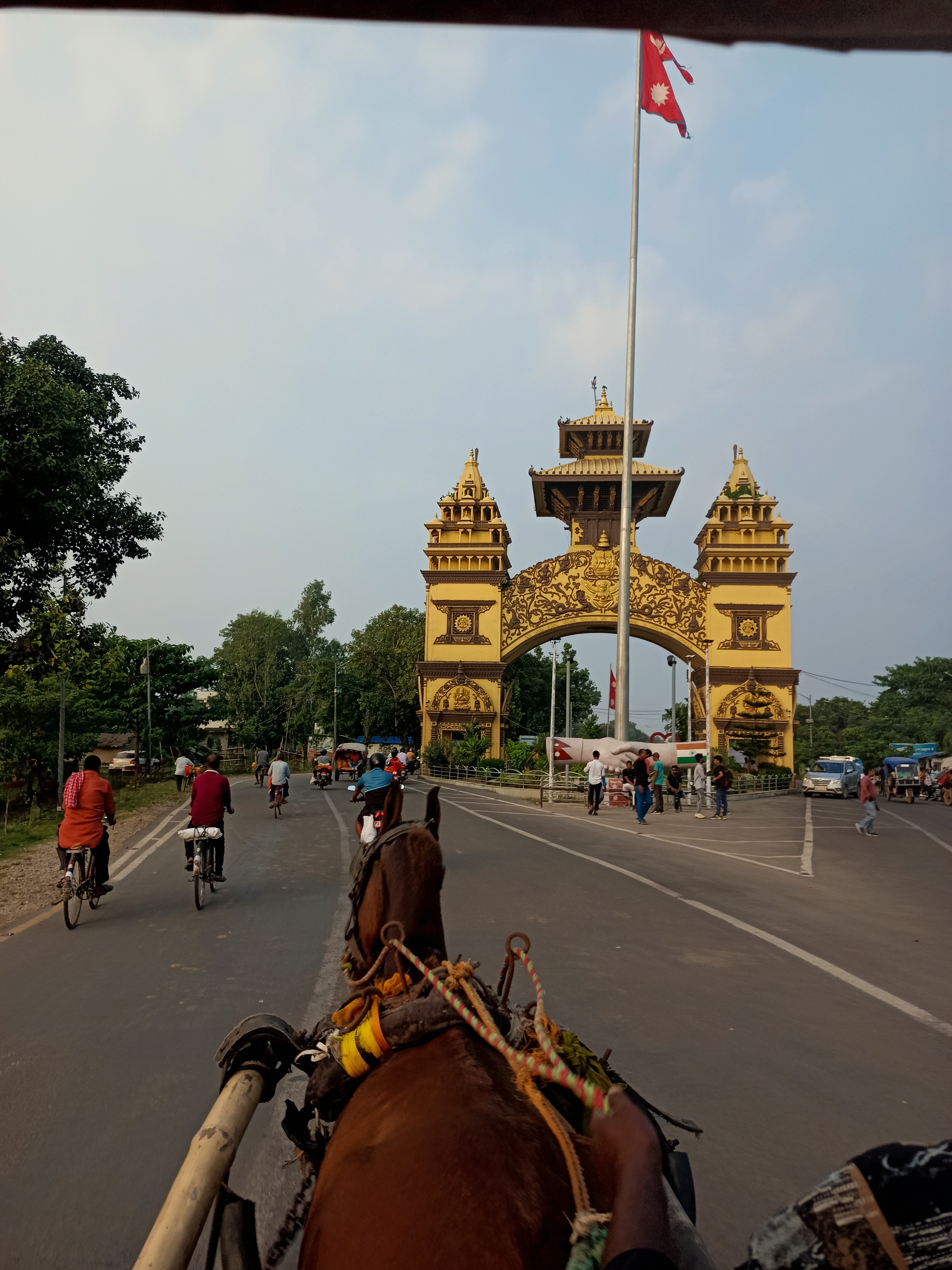
Tanga (cart) near Shankharacharya Gate, Birgunj of Entry gate of Nepal

Horse driven carts locally called Tanga have historically been the mode of transport for the Madheshi people. Today it survives as a popular transportation vehicle between Birgunj and its sister city Raxaul.

=== Cargo ===
The 6 km (3.7 mi) railway track from Raxaul to Birgunj was converted to broad gauge two years after the Indian railways converted the track to Raxaul inside India to broad gauge. Now, broad gauge railway line connects Raxaul to the Sirsiya (Birgunj) Inland Container Depot (ICD) that became fully operational in 2005. Talks have been held to reopen the railway route from Birgunj to Amlekhganj in Nepal by converting it to broad gauge because of its socio-economic importance.

Goods are transported to and from India via Birgunj dry port, which is the key terminal of surface cargo delivery to Nepal. This cargo point on the south connects the heart of the country, Kathmandu, via another key industrial city, Hetauda. It is also served by Tribhuvan Highway, extending from the Indian border at Raxaul through Birgunj and Hetauda to Kathmandu with frequent bus service. Simara Airport — 9 mi (14 km) north near the highway in Pipara Simara, Bara district—offers scheduled flights to Kathmandu.

India and Nepal have an open border with no restrictions on the movement of their citizens. There is a customs checkpoint for the movement of goods between the two countries.

== Sports ==
The city has its own stadium, Narayani Stadium which is Nepal's second largest stadium after Dasarath Rangasala built on 1981. The stadium has capacity of 15,000 seats.Its the home ground of Birgunj United FC.The team plays in Nepal Super League, top tier football league.

A national level Cricket Ground is also located beside the Narayani Stadium. The cricket ground has top class outfield and a better cricket pitch. National level and Regional level cricket tournament are regularly held here. Every year day night T20 Cricket tournament is held using temporary flood light towers. Day night cricket match in Nepal was first played here. Nepal national cricket team's players Haseem Ansari, Aarif Sheikh, Aasif Sheikh , Avinash Karn and Irshad Ahmed hail from Birgunj. Cricket is the most popular sport and is played more than any other games and sports.

== Education ==
Birgunj has a history in education. Education was started in town with the establishment of Trijuddha School by Mahavir Prasad and Raghubir Ram during the regime of Juddha Shumsher Jung Bahadur Rana which was among the first three schools to be established in Nepal. Currently, Trijuddha School is the second oldest school in Nepal. It serves classes in both English and Nepali Medium and also conducts diplomas for civil engineering.

Thakuram Multiple Campus, located in the city was the first campus to be established outside Kathmandu Valley as well as in the Narayani zone. This city has made rapid development in the field of education by the establishment of many schools and colleges. Notable institutions include:

- Alpine High School

=== Universities ===
- Madhesh University (Nepali: मधेश विश्वविद्यालय) (MU), established on Bhadra 23, 2079 B.S.

== Media ==
Birgunj has many FM Community radio stations including Narayani FM 103.8Mhz, Terai FM, Radio Birgunj, Bhojpuriya FM, Indreni FM, Radio Bindas, Birgunj Musical FM, City FM, Aawaz FM, Public FM etc. It has also different television stations: My Television, TV Birgunj and Birgunj Television (BTV). Many local newspapers like Prateek, Loktimes Daily, Kripa, Bhojpuri Time, Birgunjsanjal, Jana Aawaz etc. are published.

Some popular online news site like Yatra daily, Nepal Post Daily, Aapan Birgunj, etc. are from Birgunj. TEDxBirgunj was successfully held on 17 December, that was the first ever TED event conducted in Terai region of Nepal.

== Health ==
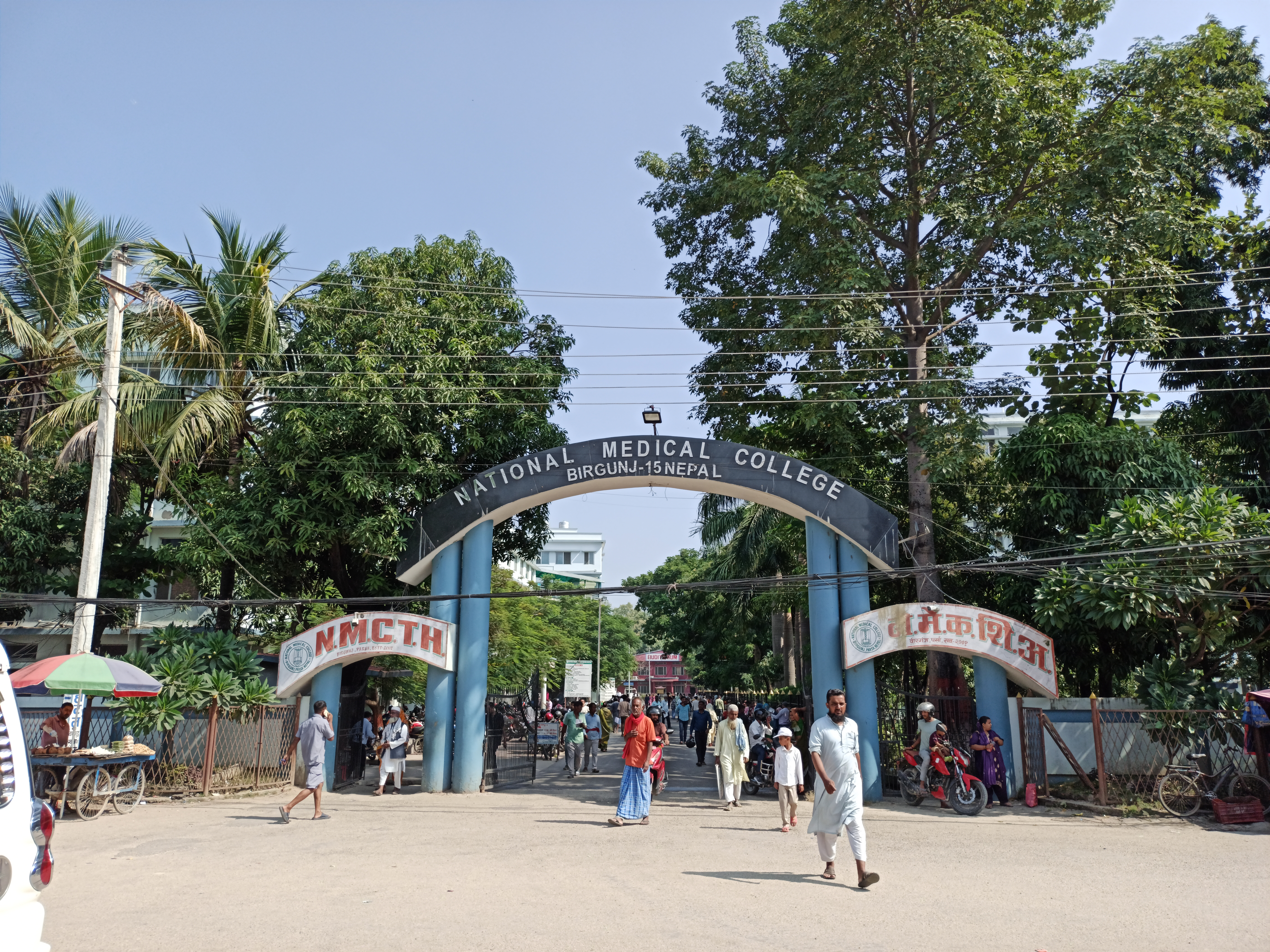
National Medical College, Birgunj.

Narayani Hospital is one of the oldest government hospital of Nepal. It is the central hospital of government of Nepal. National Medical College under TU and Kedia Dental College also under TU are two major institutions providing health facilities. There are many other big and small hospitals, and international standard diagnostic centres throughout the city.

== Cuisine ==
The cuisine of Birgunj has influence of both Nepali and Indian culture. Dal, bhat, roti, vegetable curry, and achar (pickle) are the most widely consumed food items. Tibetan cuisine such as momo and chow Mein are also popular among the youths and the elderly. A place named Adarsh Nagar has established its name as the centre for street food where food vendors sell varieties of street food during evening time. Food such as Pav Bhaji (bread and vegetable curry) and Chaat (snack made with potato as the main ingredient) are relatively popular.

== Notable people ==
- Ranu Devi Adhikari — Nepalese singer
- Bina Jaiswal - Politician
- Usha Khadgi — winner of Miss Nepal 2000
- Anju Kumari — politician
- Ruby Rana — winner of Miss Nepal 1994
- Samragyee RL Shah — actress
- Aarif Sheikh — cricketer
- Aasif Sheikh – cricketer
- Prakash Shrestha — singer

== Places of interest ==
- Gadhimai Temple
- Maisthan Mandir
- Narayani Stadium
- Parsa National Park
- Ramtole
- Simraungadh

== Gallery ==
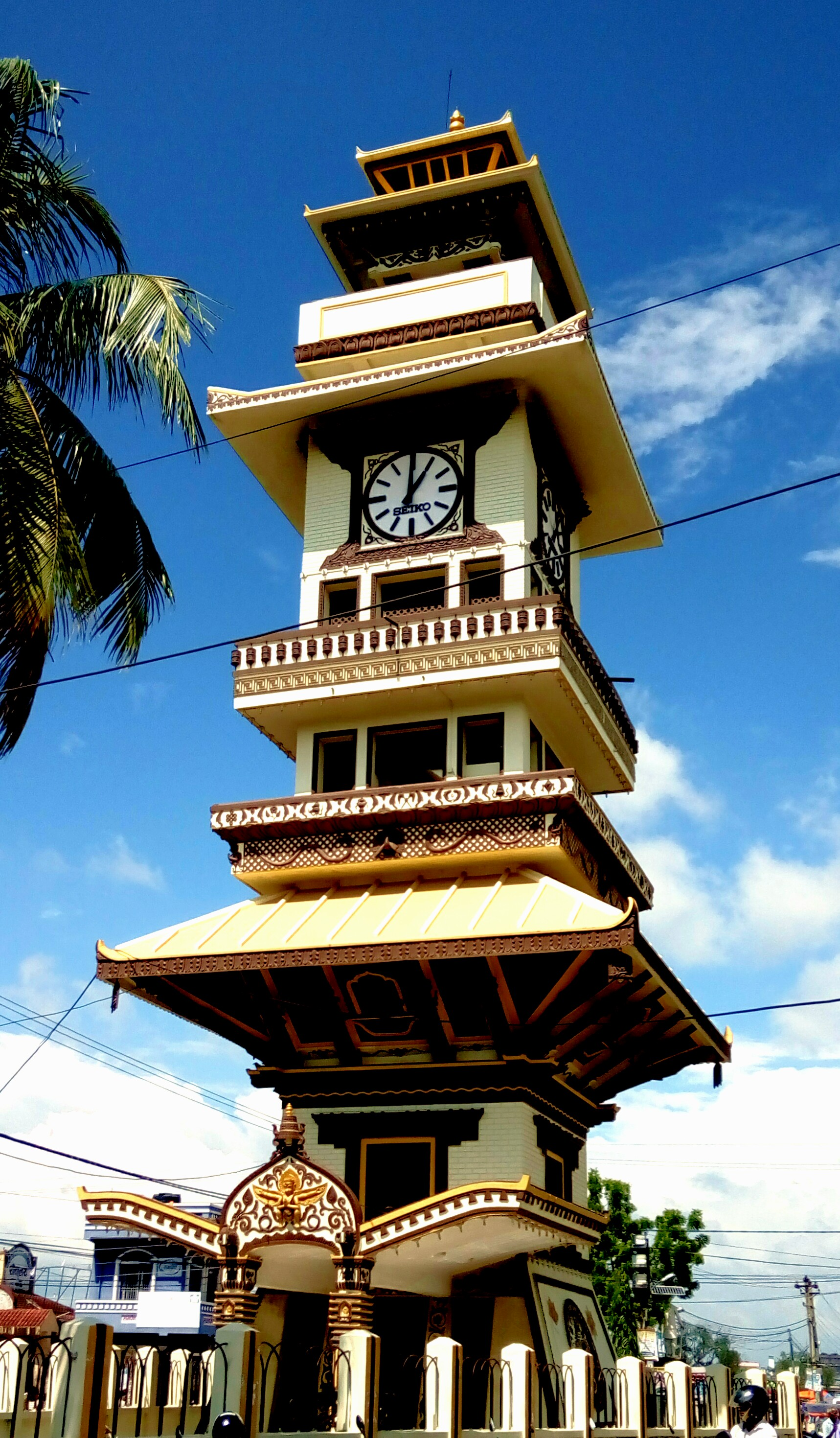
Clock tower Birgunj

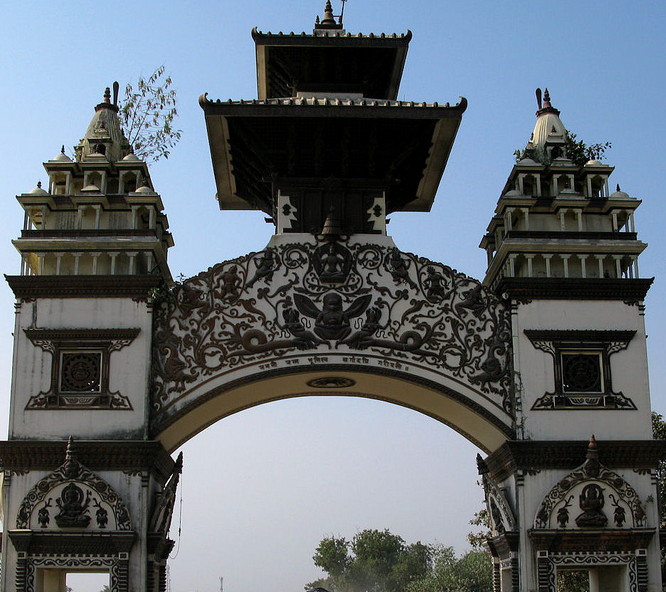
Shankaracharya gate in Birgunj

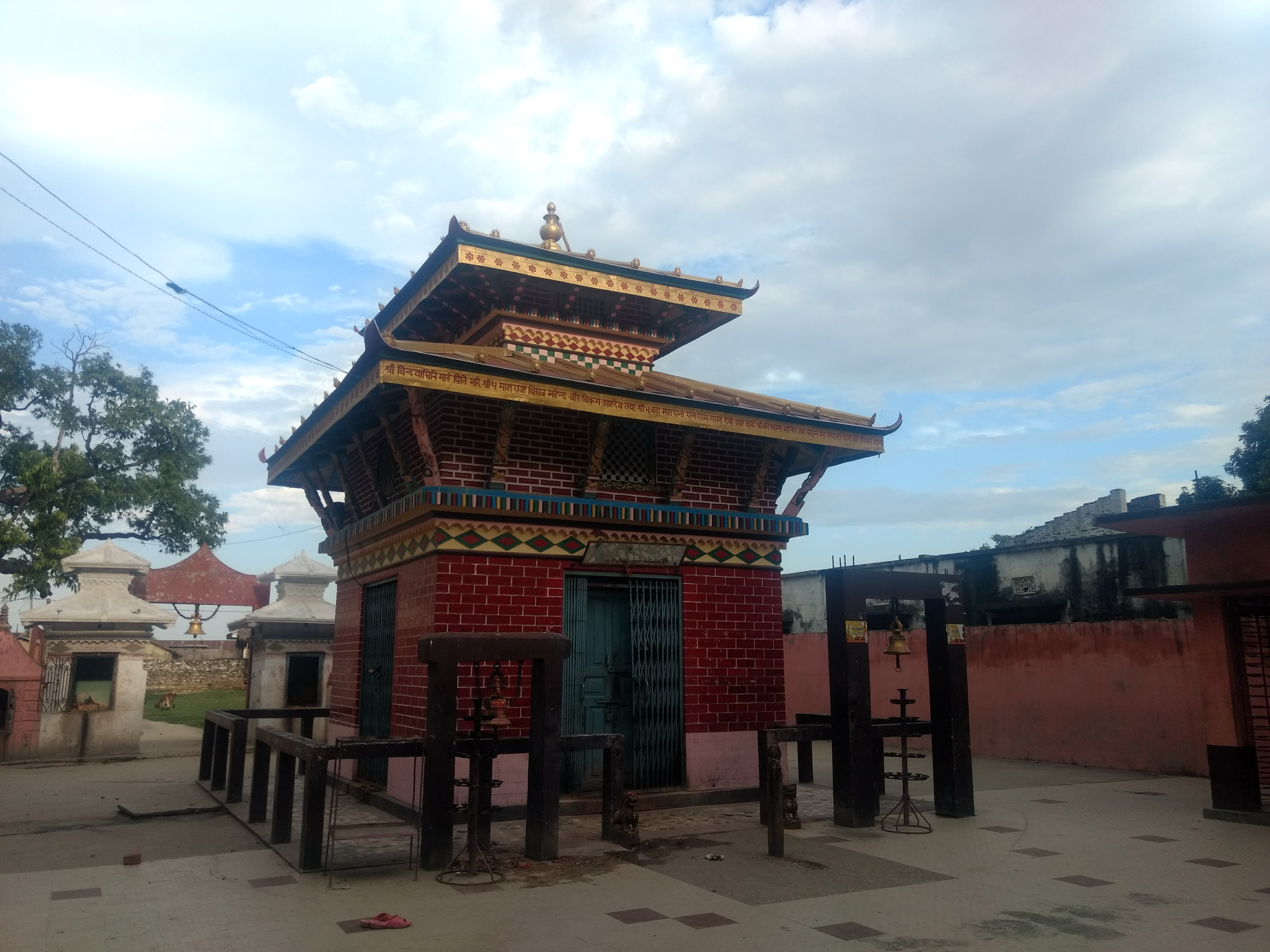
Bindhyabasini Temple, Birgunj

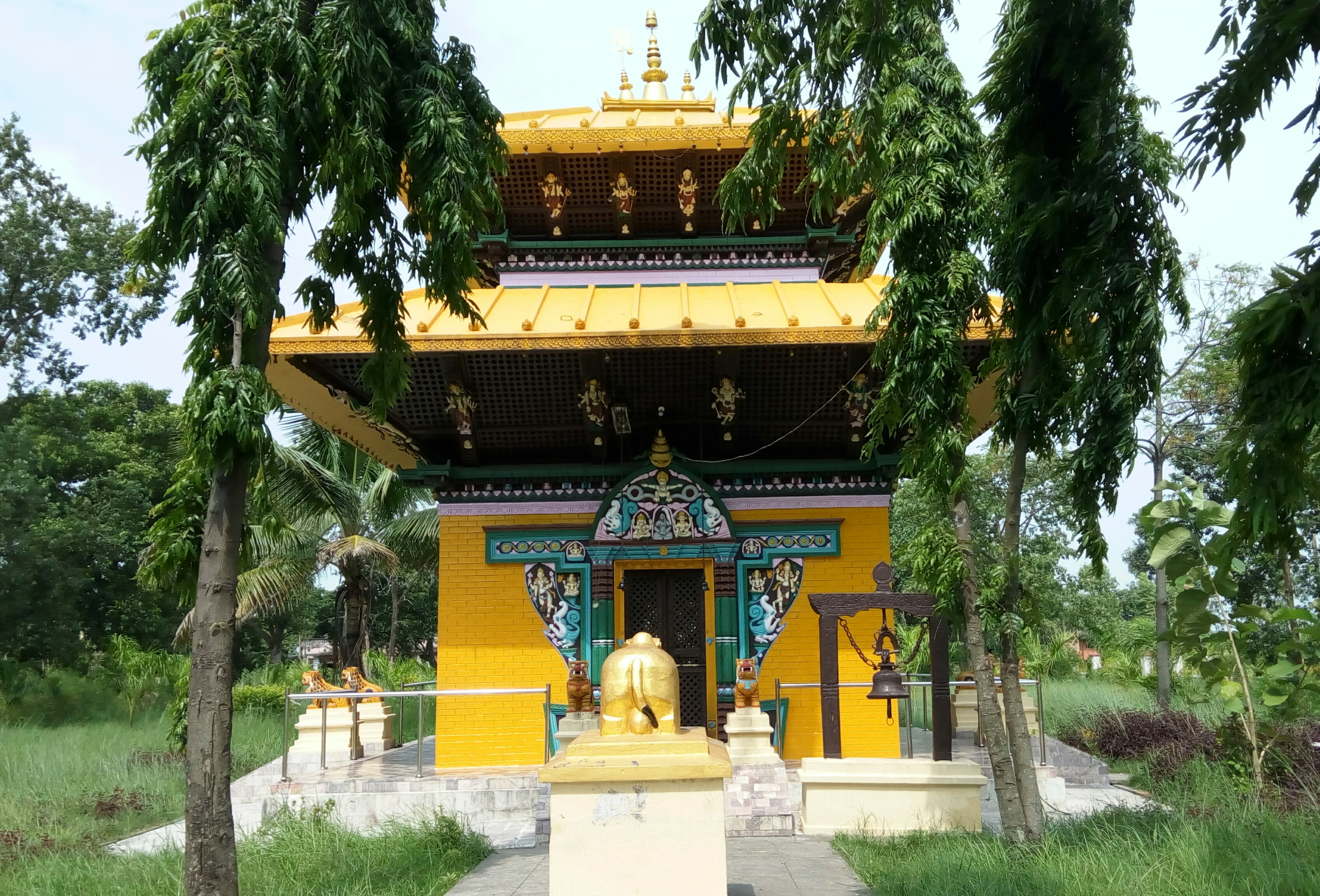
Shiva Temple located inside the Birgunj Sugar Mill compound

== See also ==
- Pokhara
- Butwal
- Dharan
- Janakpur
- 2022 Birgunj municipal election
