= Copa del Rey =

Spanish association football tournament

- Organiser(s): Royal Spanish Football Federation
- Founded: 1903; 123 years ago
- Region: Spain
- Teams: 128
- Qualifier for: UEFA Europa League; Supercopa de España
- Current champions: Real Sociedad (3rd title)
- Most championships: Barcelona (32 titles)
- Broadcasters: List of broadcasters
- Website: rfef.es
- 2026–27 Copa del Rey

The Campeonato de España–Copa de Su Majestad el Rey, (Note: Spanish pronunciation: [kampeoˈnato ðe esˈpaɲa | ˈkopa ðe su maxesˈtað el ˈrej]; "Championship of Spain–His Majesty The King's Cup") commonly known as Copa del Rey, (Note: Spanish pronunciation: [ˈkopa ðel ˈrej]; "The King's Cup") La Copa (Note: Spanish pronunciation: [la ˈkopa]; "The Cup") or (in English) the Spanish Cup or King's Cup, and formerly known as Copa del Presidente de la República (Note: "President of the Republic's Cup") (1932–1936) and Copa del Generalísimo (Note: Generalissimo's Cup) (1939–1976), is an annual knockout football competition in Spanish football, organized by the Royal Spanish Football Federation.

The competition was founded in 1903, making it the oldest Spanish football competition played at a national level. Copa del Rey winners qualify for the following season's UEFA Europa League. If they have already qualified for Europe through their league position, the Europa League spot is given to the highest-placed team in the league who has not yet qualified (until 2014 this place was awarded to the Copa runners-up, unless they too had already qualified via the league).

Barcelona is the most successful club in the competition, having won 32 titles. Athletic Bilbao has the second-most wins with 24, while Real Madrid is third with 20. Real Sociedad is the current title holder, having defeated Atlético Madrid in the 2026 final held at the Estadio de La Cartuja.

== History ==
In 1902, a competition under the name Copa de la Coronación was played after Juan de Astorquia, President of Bilbao Football Club, and Carlos Padrós, later president of Real Madrid, suggested a football tournament to celebrate the coronation of Spanish King Alfonso XIII. Four other teams joined Madrid FC for the competition: FC Barcelona, Club Español de Foot-Ball, New Foot-Ball de Madrid and Club Bizcaya (a team made up of players from Athletic Club and Bilbao FC), which eventually defeated Barcelona in the final. That cup is on display in the Athletic Bilbao museum and the club includes the victory as the first of its Copa del Rey wins, but the Royal Spanish Football Federation officially does not recognise it as such, only considering it to be the forerunner of the Copa del Rey.

The Copa del Rey was effectively Spain's national football championship from 1903 (the first edition won by Athletic Bilbao with Juan de Astorquia as captain and president) until the foundation of the Campeonato de Liga—League Championship (La Liga)—in 1929. It was initially known as the Copa del Ayuntamiento de Madrid (Madrid City Council's Cup). Between 1905 and 1932, it was known as the Copa de Su Majestad El Rey Alfonso XIII (His Majesty King Alfonso XIII's Cup). During the Second Spanish Republic, it was known as the Copa del Presidente de la República (President of the Republic Cup) or Copa de España (Spanish Cup) and during the years of Francisco Franco's Spanish State, it was known as the Copa de Su Excelencia El Generalísimo or Copa del Generalísimo (His Excellency, The Supreme General's Cup).

Athletic Bilbao were declared winners in 1904 after their opponents Español de Madrid failed to show up. Between 1903 and 1909 the competition was organized by Madrid FC or by the Madrid Federation. Afterwards, it was taken over by the FECF (Federación Española de Clubs de Football), a forerunner of the RFEF. However, in both 1910 and 1913 there was a split among the clubs and two parallel competitions were held, one organized by the FECF and the other by the UECF (Unión Española de Club de Football). All these editions are officially recognized by the RFEF. In 1937, during the Spanish Civil War, clubs in the Republican area of Spain entered the Copa de la España Libre, with Levante FC (forerunner of the present Levante UD) beating their city rivals Valencia 1–0 in the final. Although in 2009 the Congress of Deputies urged the Royal Spanish Football Federation to recognise it as a Copa del Rey win for Levante, for several years the governing body of Spanish football made no decision on the matter. On 25 March 2023, the tournament was officially recognized by the RFEF, but not as a Copa del Rey.

Because of the dispute regarding the 1902 competition, the statistics regarding the leading winners are also disputed. Barcelona have won the Copa 32 times; Athletic Bilbao are in second place, with either 24 or 25 titles, depending on the source.

Before the formation of La Liga in 1929, the competition was in essence a national championship. Teams qualified to enter via their regional leagues. Over the years, various formats, including group stages have been used. Reserve teams of the professional clubs, who compete in lower divisions of the league pyramid, were permitted to take part until 1990. For a number of years, only teams from the Primera División, Segunda A, about 23 teams from the Segunda B and the 17 Tercera División champions (or runners-up if the champion was a reserve team) were invited to enter, giving a total of 83. Amended rules for the 2019–20 edition led to the number of entrants increasing to 125 (later to 126 in 2025), including winners of the regional divisions at the fifth level.

Since the format overhaul, all rounds are single-leg ties with lower division teams hosting the match and the majority of the top-level clubs entering at the first Round (four teams taking part in the Supercopa de España entering in the third round – last 32), other than the semi-final stage which is played over two legs. This is another change introduced in 2019–20, with prior editions involving two legs from the point at which the top-tier clubs entered in the fourth round (last 32). Athletic Bilbao particularly embraced the new format, winning a total of 22 single-leg ties to reach the two-legged semi-finals in each of its first five seasons before losing to Osasuna in the 2024–25 Round of 16. The final is a one-off game played at a neutral venue, with Seville becoming the regular home.

The winners qualify for both the following season's Supercopa de España and UEFA Europa League; in the past, the runners-up often played in the Supercopa if the winners had also finished as league champions (although on some earlier occasions in these circumstances, no Supercopa match was played and the double winners were awarded the title by default). From the 2019–20 Supercopa de España edition onwards, the previous Copa del Rey runners-up automatically qualify in addition to the winners with four teams taking part in the event.

Throughout the history of the competition, there have been 12 actual trophies, which were permanently awarded to clubs for winning the competition either three times in a row or on five occasions, and for other special reasons. Thus, five trophies have been permanently awarded to Barcelona, three to Athletic Bilbao and one to Real Madrid (the last Copa de la República in 1936). Athletic kept the first trophy as inaugural winners, Sevilla were awarded the Trofeo del Generalísimo after its first edition in 1939 and Atlético Madrid, winners the previous year, were awarded the 11th trophy following the death of Francisco Franco in 1976.

On 22 December 2010, at an extraordinary general meeting of the Royal Spanish Football Federation, Sevilla requested permission from the Federation to keep the trophy they had won in the 2010 final to commemorate the victory of the Spain national team at the 2010 FIFA World Cup in South Africa. A new trophy was made by Madrid jeweler Federico Alegre. The trophy, made of silver, weighs 15 kg (33 lb) and is 75 cm (30 in) tall. On 21 April 2011, Real Madrid became the first recipients. During the post-game celebrations, the trophy was accidentally dropped by Real Madrid player Sergio Ramos from the top of a double-decker bus, which then ran over it. Ten pieces were found by civil servicemen when they recovered it from the ground at Plaza de Cibeles. The club received a copy which is displayed at Santiago Bernabéu.

The new presidency of Luis Rubiales initiated profound restructuring within the Federation. These changes impacted competitions organized by the organization, specifically the Copa del Rey and the Supercopa de España. Both were reformed with new formats designed to increase competitiveness and attractiveness. In the case of the Supercopa, the changes had a reciprocal effect; the Copa champion and runner-up were included alongside the league championship's top two finishers, creating a four-team competition. Beginning with the 2019–20 edition, the cup championship introduced a significant change: the designation of a fixed venue for the final; the Estadio de La Cartuja in Seville was chosen to host the final for a four-year period.

== Performances ==
Official winners list provided by the RFEF, as of 7 April 2024.

List of football clubs ranked by wins, together with runners-up, total finalists and seasons of finals.
| Rank | Club | Winners | Runners-up | Finalists | Seasons |
|---|---|---|---|---|---|
| 1 | Barcelona | 32 | 11 | 43 | **1909–10**, (Note: Two finals and winners are recognised for 1910 and 1913.) **1911–12**, **1912–13**, 1918–19, **1919–20**, **1922**, **1925**, **1926**, **1928**, 1931–32, 1935–36, **1942**, **1951**, **1952**, **1952–53**, 1953–54, **1957**, **1958–59**, **1962–63**, **1967–68**, **1970–71**, 1973–74, **1977–78**, **1980–81**, **1982–83**, 1983–84, 1985–86, **1987–88**, **1989–90**, 1995–96, **1996–97**, **1997–98**, **2008–09**, 2010–11, **2011–12**, 2013–14, **2014–15**, **2015–16**, **2016–17**, **2017–18**, 2018–19, **2020–21**, **2024–25** |
| 2 | Athletic Bilbao | 24 | 16 | 40 | **1903**, **1904**, 1905, 1906, **1910**, **1911**, 1913, **1914**, **1915**, **1916**, 1920, **1921**, **1923**, **1930**, **1931**, **1932**, **1933**, 1942, **1943**, **1944**, **1944–45**, 1948–49, **1949–50**, 1952–53, **1955**, **1956**, **1958**, 1965–66, 1966–67, **1969**, **1972–73**, 1976–77, **1983–84**, 1984–85, 2008–09, 2011–12, 2014–15, 2019–20, 2020–21, **2023–24** |
| 3 | Real Madrid | 20 | 21 | 41 | 1903, **1905**, **1906**, **1907**, **1908**, 1916, **1917**, 1918, 1924, 1928–29, 1930, 1933, **1934**, **1936**, 1940, 1943, **1946**, **1947**, 1958, 1959–60, 1960–61, **1961–62**, 1967–68, **1969–70**, **1973–74**, **1974–75**, 1978–79, **1979–80**, **1981–82**, 1982–83, **1988–89**, 1989–90, 1991–92, **1992–93**, 2001–02, 2003–04, **2010–11**, 2012–13, **2013–14**, **2022–23**, 2024–25 |
| 4 | Atlético Madrid | 10 | 10 | 20 | 1920–21, 1925–26, 1955–1956, **1959–60**, **1960–61**, 1963–64, **1964–65**, **1971–72**, 1974–75, **1975–76**. **1984–85**, 1986–87, **1990–91**, **1991–92**, **1995–96**, 1998–99, 1999–2000, 2009–10, **2012–13**, 2025–26 |
| 5 | Valencia | 8 | 10 | 18 | 1934, **1941**, 1944, 1944–45, 1946, **1948–49**, 1952, **1954**, **1966–67**, 1969–70, 1970–71, 1971–72, **1978–79**, 1994–95, **1998–99**, **2007–08**, **2018–19**, 2021–22 |
| 6 | Zaragoza | 6 | 5 | 11 | 1962–63, **1963–64**, 1964–65, **1965–66**, 1975–76, **1985–86**, 1992–93, **1993–94**, **2000–01**, **2003–04**, 2005–06 |
| 7 | Sevilla | 5 | 4 | 9 | **1935**, **1939**, **1947–48**, 1955, 1961–62, **2006–07**, **2009–10**, 2015–16, 2017–18 |
| 8 | Espanyol | 4 | 5 | 9 | 1911, 1915, **1929**, **1940**, 1941, 1947, 1957, **1999–2000**, **2005–06** |
| 9 | Real Sociedad | 3 | 4 | 7 | 1913, 1928, 1951, **1986–87**, 1987–88, **2019–20**, **2025–26** |
| 9 | Real Betis | 3 | 2 | 5 | 1931, **1976–77**, 1996–97, **2004–05**, **2021–22** |
| 9 | Real Unión | 3 | 1 | 4 | **1918**, 1922, **1924**, **1927** |
| 12 | Deportivo La Coruña | 2 | – | 2 | **1994–95**, **2001–02** |
| 13 | Arenas | 1 | 3 | 4 | 1917, **1919**, 1925, 1927 |
| 13 | Mallorca | 1 | 3 | 4 | 1990–91, 1997–98, **2002–03**, 2023–24 |
| 13 | Club Ciclista de San Sebastián (Note: The 1909 final was won by Club Ciclista de San Sebastián, using players from the newly-formed team Real Sociedad which was not officially founded until later that year.) | 1 | – | 1 | **1909** |
| 13 | Racing Club de Irún (Note: Racing de Irún merged with Irún Sporting Club in 1915 to form Real Unión.) | 1 | – | 1 | **1913** |
| 17 | Español de Madrid | – | 3 | 3 | 1904, 1909, 1910 |
| 17 | Celta Vigo | – | 3 | 3 | 1947–48, 1993–94, 2000–01 |
| 17 | Sporting Gijón | – | 2 | 2 | 1981, 1982 |
| 17 | Real Valladolid | – | 2 | 2 | 1949–50, 1988–89 |
| 17 | Getafe | – | 2 | 2 | 2006–07, 2007–08 |
| 17 | Osasuna | – | 2 | 2 | 2004–05, 2022–23 |
| 17 | Bizcaya | – | 1 | 1 | 1907 |
| 17 | Real Vigo Sporting | – | 1 | 1 | 1908 |
| 17 | Vasconia Sporting Club (Note: The 1910 tournament was played by Real Sociedad under the umbrella of Vasconia, due to registration issues in respect of it being so recently incorporated.) | – | 1 | 1 | 1910 |
| 17 | Gimnástica | – | 1 | 1 | 1912 |
| 17 | Espanya de Barcelona | – | 1 | 1 | 1914 |
| 17 | CE Europa | – | 1 | 1 | 1923 |
| 17 | Sabadell | – | 1 | 1 | 1935 |
| 17 | Racing de Ferrol | – | 1 | 1 | 1938–39 |
| 17 | Granada | – | 1 | 1 | 1958–59 |
| 17 | Elche | – | 1 | 1 | 1969 |
| 17 | Castellón | – | 1 | 1 | 1972–73 |
| 17 | Las Palmas | – | 1 | 1 | 1977–78 |
| 17 | Real Madrid Castilla ‡ | – | 1 | 1 | 1979–80 |
| 17 | Recreativo | – | 1 | 1 | 2002–03 |
| 17 | Alavés | – | 1 | 1 | 2016–17 |

‡ Real Madrid's reserve team. Reserve teams have been banned from this competition from 1990–91 onward.
‡‡ The number of wins Athletic Bilbao have been credited with is disputed. The 1902 version was won by Bizcaya, a team made up of players from Athletic Bilbao and Bilbao FC. In 1903 these two clubs merged as the current Athletic Bilbao. The 1902 cup is on display in the Athletic museum and the club includes it in its own honors list. However, that edition is not recognized as official by the RFEF.

Clubs in italic no longer exist. Seasons in bold indicate winners, whilst season in italic are losing finalists.

== Top goalscorers ==
Bold indicates a player still active in Spain.

| Rank | Nat. | Player | Pos. | Years | Club(s) (goals) | Total | Ref. |
|---|---|---|---|---|---|---|---|
| 1 | (Spain) | Telmo Zarra | FW | 1939–1957 | Athletic Bilbao (81) | 81 | |
| 2 | (Spain) | Josep Samitier | MF | 1919–1934 | Barcelona (65); Real Madrid (5) | 70 | |
| 3 | (Spain) | Guillermo Gorostiza | FW | 1928–1946 | Racing Ferrol (3); Athletic Bilbao (37); Valencia (24) | 64 | |
| 4 | (Argentina) | Lionel Messi | FW | 2004–2021 | Barcelona (56) | 56 | |
| 5 | (Spain) | Edmundo Suárez | FW | 1939–1950 | Valencia (55) | 55 | |
| 6 | (Spain) | Quini | FW | 1968–1987 | Sporting Gijón (36); Barcelona (14) | 50 | |
| 7 | (Hungary) (Spain) | Ferenc Puskás | FW | 1958–1966 | Real Madrid (49) | 49 | |
| 7 | (Czechoslovakia) (Hungary) (Spain) | László Kubala | FW | 1951–1965 | Barcelona (49) | 49 | |
| 7 | (Spain) | Santillana | FW | 1970–1988 | Real Madrid (49) | 49 | |
| 10 | (Spain) | César Rodríguez | FW | 1939–1960 | Granada (3); Barcelona (36); Elche (8) | 47 | |

== Individual records ==
- Most goals scored: 81 – Telmo Zarra
- Most goals scored in finals: 9 – Lionel Messi
- Most finals scored in: 7 – Lionel Messi
- Most assists provided in finals: 6 – Lionel Messi
- Most man of the match awards won in finals: 3 – Lionel Messi
- Most appearances made in finals: 10 – Lionel Messi and Sergio Busquets
- Most cup wins: 7 – José Maria Belauste, Piru Gaínza, Gerard Piqué, Sergio Busquets and Lionel Messi

== Broadcasters ==
From the 2019–20 season, the final match is already included in La Copa broadcasting rights package. Previously, the final match is excluded in selected countries (other broadcasters (including Spain) will receive the Supercopa rights after covering a Copa final match) due to laws and regulations of the tournament broadcasting rights by CNMC in Spain. In a separate deal, streamer Ibai Llanos would broadcast the 2026 final on his personal YouTube channel.

=== Spain and Andorra ===
==== 2025–2027 ====
| Broadcaster | Copa del Rey | Supercopa | Ref |
|---|---|---|---|
| RTVE | 15 matches free, including semi-finals and final | No | |
| Movistar+ | 55 matches | All three matches | |

=== International ===
| Country | Broadcaster | | |
| Country | Copa del Rey | Supercopa | Ref |
|---|---|---|---|
| Afghanistan | TOLO | | |
| Afghanistan | | Solh Sports | |
| Africa | Sporty TV (English) | | |
| Africa | StarTimes (English) | | |
| Africa | Canal+ (French) | | |
| Africa | ZAP (Portuguese) | | |
| Albania | SuperSport | | |
| Kosovo | SuperSport | | |
| Armenia | | Armenia TV | |
| Australia | | beIN Sports | |
| New Zealand | | beIN Sports | |
| Austria | DAZN | Puls 4 | |
| Austria | DAZN | Sportdigital | |
| Germany | DAZN | Sportdigital | |
| Switzerland | DAZN | Sportdigital | |
| France | DAZN | L'Équipe | |
| Italy | DAZN | Cronache di Spogliatoio | |
| Balkans: Bosnia and Herzegovina; Croatia; Montenegro; North Macedonia; Serbia; Slovenia | Arena Sport | | |
| Belarus | Sport TV | | |
| Belgium | RTL-TVI (French) | | |
| Bolivia | Unitel | | |
| Brazil | Xsports | | |
| South America | ESPN | | |
| United States | ESPN | | |
| Brunei | | Astro | |
| Malaysia | | Astro | |
| Bulgaria | Max Sport | bTV Action | |
| Bulgaria | Max Sport | Ring | |
| Central America | Sky Sports | | |
| Dominican Republic | Sky Sports | | |
| Mexico | Sky Sports | | |
| Colombia | RCN | | |
| Colombia | Win Sports | | |
| Chile | Mega | | |
| China | ZhiBo8 | | |
| Cuba | | Tele Rebelde | |
| Cyprus | Cytavision | | |
| Czechia | | Nova Sport | |
| Slovakia | | Nova Sport | |
| Denmark | Disney+ | Sport Live | |
| Denmark | Disney+ | Bold+ | |
| Iceland | Disney+ | | |
| Norway | Disney+ | VG+ | |
| Sweden | Disney+ | Sportbladet | |
| Finland | Disney+ | | |
| Finland | Veikkaus | | |
| Ecuador | ECDF | | |
| Estonia | Go3 Sport | | |
| Latvia | Go3 Sport | | |
| Lithuania | Go3 Sport | | |
| Greece | Action 24 | | |
| Guatemala | TV Azteca | | |
| Hungary | Sport1 | | |
| Indian subcontinent | FanCode | | |
| Indonesia | Hanif Thamrin (via YouTube) | | |
| Iran | IRIB | | |
| Iran | Persiana Sports | | |
| Ireland | Premier Sports | TNT Sports | |
| United Kingdom | Premier Sports | TNT Sports | |
| United Kingdom | ITV | TNT Sports | |
| Israel | Charlton | | |
| Japan | U-Next | | |
| Kazakhstan | Sport+ | | |
| Maldives | | ICE | |
| West Asia and North Africa | MBC Group | | |
| West Asia and North Africa | Shasha | Thmanyah | |
| Myanmar | | Canal+ | |
| Netherlands | Ziggo Sport | | |
| Pakistan | | Begin | |
| Peru | América TV | | |
| Poland | Eleven Sports | | |
| Portugal | Sport TV | | |
| Romania | Prima Sport | Digi Sport | |
| Russia | Match TV | | |
| South Korea | Coupang Play | | |
| Suriname | SCCN | | |
| Tajikistan | Varzish TV | | |
| Thailand | | True Sports | |
| Turkey | Habertürk TV | | |
| Turkey | S Sport | | |
| Ukraine | Maincast | MEGOGO | |
| Uzbekistan | Zo'r TV | | |
| Venezuela | Meridiano TV | | |
| Venezuela | Venevisión | | |

== See also ==
- Copa Federación de España

== Notes ==
A. En route to the final, Español de Madrid had tied one game and had not completed the other game, which led Athletic Bilbao to file a complaint. Faced with this problem and unable to quickly resolve the case, the Madrid Association decided to award the cup to Athletic as defending champions.

B. Playing as Club Ciclista de San Sebastián.

C. Playing as Vasconia de San Sebastián.

D. A mini-group of three teams was played, with Athletic Bilbao defeating Madrid FC 2–0 a day before their win over Vasconia, thus the match between the Basque teams was decisive in deciding the winner, although not a typical final (Vasconia then played Madrid the following day to complete the group, also winning 2–0).

E. The first final, played the day earlier, ended 2–2 after extra time.

F. Originally played as a two-legged final. The first match, played seven days earlier, ended 2–2, and the second match, played six days earlier, ended 0–0.

G. The first final, played two days earlier, ended 0–0 after extra time.

H. The first and second final ended 1–1 after extra time. Both matches were played a month before the second replay.

I. Real Madrid won the penalty shoot-out 4–3.

J. Betis won the penalty shoot-out 8–7.

K. Real Sociedad won the penalty shoot-out 4–2.

L. Zaragoza won the penalty shoot-out 5–4.

M. The match was suspended by heavy rain and hail in the 79th minute, and was resumed three days later.

N. Barcelona won the penalty shoot-out 5–4.
