= Thakur Ram Multiple Campus =

Campus in Parsa district of Nepal

Coordinates: 27.012980970982°N 84.86792200006445°E

- ठाकुर राम बहुमुखी क्याम्पस
- Other name: TRMC
- Type: Public university
- Established: 1952
- Parent institution: Tribhuwan University
- Chairperson: Dr. Umesh Prasad Chaurasiya
- Head: Dr. Rajdeo Kushwaha
- Location: Parsa District, Madhesh Province, Nepal
- Campus: Urban
- Website: trmc.tu.edu.np

Thakur Ram Multiple Campus (Nepali: ठाकुर राम बहुमुखी क्याम्पस) is one of the constituent campuses of Tribhuvan University located in Birgunj city of Parsa district in Madhesh province of Nepal. The campus was established in 2009 BS (1952 CE). It offers courses in science, management, humanities and education in bachelor's and master's degrees.

== History ==
The campus was established in 1952, nearly nine years before the establishment of Tribhuvan University, the first university of Nepal. It was first affiliated with Patna University of India. The campus used to invite lecturers from India. In 2009 BS, after establishment of Tribhuwan University, the campus was tied to Tribhuvan University.

== Infrastructures ==
The campus has 14 bighas (approx. 94,800 sq. m.) of land and two buildings.

Due to budget deficits, the campus is said to lack regular classes, extracurricular activities and maintenance of infrastructure. This led to strikes by students. As a result of the complaints, some improvements are being implemented.

== Notable alumni ==
Some of the notable alumni are:

- Madhav Kumar Nepal- former prime minister
- Surya Prasad Upadhyay- the first commissioner of the Commission for the Investigation of Abuse of Authority
- Lalbabu Raut- chief minister of Madhesh Province
