= BTV Cinema =

Bulgarian television channel

bTV Cinema
- Type: Private
- Country: Bulgaria
- Network: bTV Media Group
- Headquarters: Sofia, Bulgaria Sq. 1

Programming
- Language(s): Bulgarian
- Picture format: 16:9 (1080i HD; 576i SD)

Ownership
- Owner: News Corporation (2009-10); CME (since 2010)
- Sister channels: bTV; bTV Comedy; bTV Action; bTV Story; RING

History
- Launched: 7 December 2009

Links
- Website: www.btv.bg/cinema

bTV Cinema is a Bulgarian television channel, broadcasting movies and serials. It is part of bTV Media Group, owned by CME (Central European Media Enterprises). The channel starts on 7 December 2009. bTV Cinema is aimed at viewers of all ages with an emphasis on active audiences aged 18–49 years. The program of bTV Cinema includes hit films and TV series als of all genres. Viewers can also see samples of European cinema. It also broadcasting already aired Bulgarian serials such as Glass Home, Seven Hours Difference and Revolution Z.

Since 2012 bTV Cinema broadcasts live prizes like the Oscars, Golden Globe Awards and more. Since 7 October 2012 the format of the picture is set to 16:9.

== Logos ==
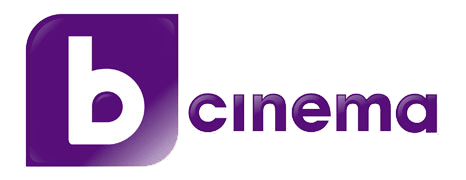
bTV Cinema logo used 2009-2016
