= Maisthan Mandir =

Historic temple in Nepal

Gahawa Mai Mandir, also known as Maisthan Mandir, (Nepali: गहवा माई मन्दिर) is an historic temple in Birganj, Parsa District, Nepal.

Built in the 18th century, Gahawa Mai Mandir was established to honor the goddess Mai. It is the scene of a large festival during Navratri during which visitors offer animal sacrifices to Mai and also to keep jamara. it is said that Gahawa mai temple established to protect the city birgunj from the devils eyes, as said by the gahawa local residence.
