= 2006 Birgunj unrest =

Several incidents of unrest in Birgunj, Nepal on 22 May 2006

- Date: May 22, 2006
- Location: Birgunj (वीरगञ्ज) Parsa District (पर्सा जिल्ला); Madhesh Province (मधेश प्रदेश) Nepal (सङ्घीय लोकतान्त्रिक गणतन्त्र नेपाल); 27°0′N 84°52′E
- Caused by: Announcement by the Parliament of Nepal on 18 May 2006 that the country would become a secular state.
- Methods: Protests
- Result: Closure of Birgunj (वीरगञ्ज) for two days.; The Parliament of Nepal adopted an Interim Constitution on January 15, 2007 declaring Nepal to be a secular state.

Parties
Hindu groups	Parliament of Nepal

The 2006 Birganj unrest were several incidents of unrest perpetrated by Hindu groups in the Nepalese city of Birgunj on 22 May 2006 following the announcement by the Parliament of Nepal on 18 May that the country will become a secular state. The declaration lead to widespread unrest by Hindu fundamentalist groups across Nepal – the town of Birgunj was forced to close for two days.

== The unrest ==
Hindu organizations in Nepal viewed the declaration of secular Nepal as "defamatory" and "dangerous" and told that it could provoke a "religious crusade" in the country.

The town of Birgunj lies on the border with India and according to local journalists the people involved in the unrest in the town had the character of the Hindu nationalist rallies that take place in India. The town was closed down by an alliance of Hindu groups – with thousands taking to the streets.
