= Krassimir Guergov =

Bulgarian businessman (born 1961)

Krassimir Guergov (Bulgarian: Красимир Гергов) is a Bulgarian businessman, who was born on 30 September 1961. He is an ex-officer from the Bulgarian secret services during the communist regime. His main business is related to advertising and media in Bulgaria. He completed "Sports Journalism", "Tourism, Alpinism and Orienteering" and specialised World Report at CNN, Atlanta and London. In 1994 he acquired the right to broadcast the American TV channel CNN in Bulgaria and created the first private national television in Bulgaria, broadcasting the CNN programme (Triada - CNN). He was also the creator of the first private national radio in Bulgaria, together with Radio Free Europe (RFE).

== Positions ==
Guergov has been the president of the board of directors of the Association of Advertising Agencies in Bulgaria since 1996. The association is a member of the International Advertising Association (IAA).
