= BTV Comedy =

Bulgarian television channel

bTV Comedy
- Type: Private
- Country: Bulgaria
- Broadcast area: Bulgaria
- Network: bTV Media Group
- Headquarters: Sofia, Bulgaria

Programming
- Language: Bulgarian
- Picture format: HDTV 1080i (downscaled to 16:9 576i for the SD feed

Ownership
- Owner: Central European Media Enterprises (CME)
- Sister channels: bTV, bTV Cinema, bTV Action, bTV Story, RING

History
- Launched: 1 June 1997 (as Television Triada)
- Former names: Television Triada (1997–2005); GTV (2005–2009)

Links
- Website: www.btv.bg/comedy

bTV Comedy is a Bulgarian family-based television channel, airing mostly comedy series. It is part of bTV Media Group, owned by Central European Media Enterprises. Originally launched in 1997 as Television Triada - a news channel airing CNN English language news, it replaced TV5Monde terrestrial in Sofia. It was owned by Krassimir Guergov and Triada Communications. On September 30, 2005, it was re-branded as GTV (sometimes promoted as "The Good Television" and Guergov TV) and began airing comedy series and films. The current name of the channel, bTV, was put in place on October 1, 2009, when bTV took over the channel.

== Programming ==
=== Current Programming ===
- American Auto
- Friends
- God Friended Me
- Kamiondžije d.o.o.
- La que se avecina
- The Middle
- Trolls: The Beat Goes On!
- Two and a Half Men
- Unbreakable Kimmy Schmidt
- Will & Grace
- Wellington Paranormal
- The Goldbergs (2013 TV series)
- Young & Hungry
- Fuller House (TV series)

=== Former Programming ===
- Festa é Festa
- Marlon
- Modern Family
- The Mr. Peabody & Sherman Show
- Sunny Beach
- Trolls: TrollsTopia
- The Windsors
- Young Sheldon
- 2 Broke Girls
- Malcolm in the Middle
- Aquí no hay quien viva
- Mind Your Language
- Allo, Allo
