= Seven Hours Difference =

- Седем часа разлика
- Genre: Drama; Crime
- Written by: Luben Dilov - Son; Milena Fuchedjieva
- Starring: Vanya Tsvetkova; Malin Krastev; Aleksandra Raeva; Boryana Bratoeva; Todor Darlyanov; Simeon Lyutakov; Kalin Sarmenov; Tony Minasyan; Maria Statulova; Yuriy Angelov; Penko Gospodinov
- Country of origin: Bulgaria
- Original languages: Bulgarian; English; Russian
- No. of seasons: 3
- No. of episodes: 76

Production
- Running time: 45 minutes 90 minutes
- Production company: Global Films

Original release
- Network: bTV
- Release: 18 September 2011 – 24 March 2013

Seven Hours Difference is a Bulgarian television drama, which premiered on 18 September 2011 on bTV. It followed the life of a respectable judge with a connection to the mafia, her family and friends. The action was set in Bulgaria and in the USA. The characters in the TV series are inspired by real people.

== Premise ==
Tanya Stoeva is a judge with a strong but controversial connection to her childhood friend Mihail Mihaylov - Miloto, a mafia boss. Tanya's daughter - Maya, is in love with Teo, the son of a famous reporter but Rocky - Mihail's son, wants her for himself. After a night spent together, Maya and Teo are attacked and Maya is brutally raped. After this Tanya sends Maya to her brother in the USA - Boyan. When Tanya begins to suspect Rocky for the rape, a new prosecutor is hired to solve the case.

== Development ==
After the big success of the first Bulgarian TV series made after a pause of almost two decades, bTV ordered the pilot for Seven Hours Difference. The series was sold to the Macedonian television network Kanal 5 before it premiered in Bulgaria. The premiere was on 18 September 2011. The first few episodes had very high ratings but after a while viewership dropped to a steady level. Despite that, Seven Hours Difference remains one of the most popular Bulgarian productions ever to be broadcast.

A second season was ordered during the production of the 15th episode. The first season ended on 18 December 2011, spanning 26 episodes.

The pilot ran as a whole 2 hours episode(with commercials), but ever since bTV airs two consequential 1 hour episodes, which although having each an intro and outro, don't seem to be separate. The first season finale was also a two-hour episode.

Season	Timeslot	TV Season	Channel	Episodes	Premiere	Finale
1	Sunday, 8:00 PM	2011 (Autumn)	bTV	26	18 September 2011	18 December 2011
2	Sunday, 8:00 PM	2012 (Autumn)	bTV	26	18 September 2011	23 September 2012
2	Sunday, 8:00 PM	2012 (Autumn)	bTV	26	18 September 2011	18 December 2012
2	Sunday, 8:00 PM	2013 (Winter-Spring)	bTV	26	18 September 2011	24 March 2013
2	Sunday, 8:00 PM	2012 (Spring)	bTV	26	18 September 2011	10 June 2012
3			bTV	26		
