= Melody Radio (Bulgaria) =

Bulgaria
- Frequency: Sofia - 93.40 MHz

Programming
- Format: music

Ownership
- Owner: Oberon Radio Max

History
- First air date: 15 August 2007

Links
- Website: http://www.melodybg.com

Radio Melody is a Bulgarian radio station, launched in 2007. It is part of Oberon Radio Max It airs only in Sofia and online. Its core audience is mainly older listeners and the station mainly plays music from the 1950s, 1960s, 1970s, 1980s and 1990s along with the best pop, classic Bulgarian and evergreen music.
