= Radio Vitosha =

Radio station based in Sofia, Bulgaria

Radio Vitosha is a radio station based in Sofia, Bulgaria, and founded in 1991. It targets listeners aged between 24 and 45. The motto of Radio Vitosha is Следвай музиката (Follow the music).

The station was the first in Bulgaria to launch a morning show, "Тройка на Разсъмване" (The Troika At Dawn). Later, several other station copied the idea, but Vitosha's trio of presenters are still popular due to the variety of subjects they covers. The station's main office is located on Srebarna street, near the Sofia Zoo.

== Frequencies ==
- Sofia, Pernik 97.6 MHz
- Plovdiv, Pazardzhik, 97.0 MHz
- Varna 92.6 MHz
- Burgas 96.7 MHz
- Vidin 95.8 MHz
- Sevlievo 90.6 MHz
- Pleven 106.1 MHz
- Dobrich 96.6 MHz
- Silistra 105.8 MHz
- Blagoevgrad, Dupnitsa 93.6 MHz
- Petrich, Sandanski 94.1 MHz
- Smolyan 90.9 MHz
- Kardzhali 106.5 MHz
- Svilengrad, Haskovo, Stara Zagora 97.6 MHz
- Sliven, Yambol 106.4 MHz
