= Glass Home =

- Стъклен Дом
- Genre: Drama; Family; Crime
- Starring: Kalin Vrachanski; Elena Petrova; Yulian Vergov (Season 1, 4 and 5 - full, Season 2 and 3 - partial); Yana Marinova; Stefan Danailov; Asen Blatechki (from Season 2); Luiza Grigorova; Boyko Krаstanov; Radina Kаrdzhilova; Georgi Novakov and others
- Opening theme: Glass Home theme music
- Country of origin: Bulgaria
- No. of seasons: 5
- No. of episodes: 64

Production
- Executive producers: Dimitar Mitovski; Dimitar Gochev
- Running time: ~70 minutes (Season 1); ~90 minutes (Season 2-3,5); ~45 minutes (Season 4)

Original release
- Network: bTV
- Release: 11 April 2010 – 11 June 2012

Glass Home (Bulgarian: Стъклен дом, Stˈɤ̞klen dom) was a Bulgarian drama series created by bTV. It's a family drama and the executive producers were Dimitаr Mitovski and Dimitаr Gochev from "Camera OOD". It aired in bTV's primetime. Some of Bulgaria's most famous actors star in the series, which was directed by Viktor Bojinov and Petar Rusev.

== Summary ==
In the beginning of 2010, bTV announced that a new Bulgarian show was shot, starting in February 2010. On 11 April 2010 the first season premieres and continues to 20 June the same year. After a short pause, the second season begins on 26 September and it's titled "Glass Home: Time for Truth" (Bulgarian: "Стъклен дом: Време за истина"). 13 episodes were shown and the show went on another pause, which ended with the beginning of second half of the second season: "Glass Home: Time for Truth - The Resolution" (Bulgarian: "Стъклен дом: Време за истина - Развръзката"). On 30 March, bTV announced that season 3 started on 11 April 2011, exactly one year after the show's first episode aired, and with no break between Season 2 and 3. It is called "Glass Home: The Temptation" (Bulgarian: "Стъклен дом: Изушението") and it takes place three years after the finale of the second season. One of the storylines of this season is Elena's husband, who later becomes the president of Bulgaria. The season ended on 10 June 2011 after airing nine episodes. The fourth season started airing in Bulgaria on 31 October 2011, a day after the Bulgarian Presidential Election, with the subtitle "The Punishment" (Bulgarian: "Стъклен дом: Наказанието").

== Ratings ==
=== In Bulgaria ===
Glass Home was one of the most watched programs in the history of Bulgarian television, with all episodes gaining ratings higher than a million viewers, which in a country with a total population less than 7 million was a big success, and the most watched with over 1.8 million. In the social network Facebook, the show has over 200,000 fans (or "likes"). It even has more likes than its broadcasting channel, bTV.

=== In Turkey ===
FOX Turkey aired the first season Thursdays at 2am, which led to the low ratings in the country. The ratings continued decreasing and FOX decided to cancel the series.

=== In Macedonia ===
Glas Home was widely promoted and gained big success in Macedonia. It premiered on 1 August 2011 on Kanal 5. The channel aired the three seasons Monday through Friday at 7.50 PM. The third season started in a new timeslot at 10 AM and no reason or explanation about the move was given. The third season finale aired on 3 October 2011.

== Seasons and airdates ==
Season	Timeslot	Subtitle	Episodes	TV Season	Premiere	Finale
1	Sunday, 8 PM	Everything has its price	11	2010 (spring)	11 April 2010	20 June 2010
2	Monday, 8 PM	Time for Truth(2.1); The Resolution(2.2)	17	2010 (autumn); 2011(spring)	26 September 2010 (2.1); 14 March 2011 (2.2)	13 December 2010 (2.1); 4 April 2011 (2.2)
3	Monday, 8 PM	The Temptation	9	2011 (spring)	11 April 2011	6 June 2011
4	Monday, 8 PM	The Punishment	18	2011 (autumn)	31 October 2011	19 December 2011
5	Monday, 8 PM	The Salvation	9	2012 (spring)	16 April 2012	11 June 2012

=== Season 1 (2010) ===
Glass Home Season 1

No	Airdate
1 (1-01)	11 April 2010
2 (1-02)	18 April 2010
3 (1-03)	25 April 2010
4 (1-04)	2 May 2010
5 (1-05)	9 May 2010
6 (1-06)	16 May 2010
7 (1-07)	23 May 2010
8 (1-08)	30 May 2010
9 (1-09)	6 June 2010
10 (1-10)	13 June 2010
11 (1-11)	20 June 2010

=== Season 2 (2010-2011) ===
Glass Home Season 2.0: Time for Truth

No	Airdate
12 (2-01)	26 September 2010
13 (2-02)	27 September 2010
14 (2-03)	4 October 2010
15 (2-04)	11 October 2010
16 (2-05)	18 October 2010
17 (2-06)	25 October 2010
18 (2-07)	1 November 2010
19 (2-08)	8 November 2010
20 (2-09)	15 November 2010
21 (2-10)	22 November 2010
22 (2-11)	29 November 2010
23 (2-12)	6 December 2010
24 (2-13)	13 December 2010

Glass Home Season 2.5: Time for Truth: The Resolution

No	Airdate
25 (2-14)	14 March 2011
26 (2-15)	21 March 2011
27 (2-16)	28 March 2011
28 (2-17)	4 April 2011

=== Season 3 (2011) ===
Glass Home Season 3: The Temptation

No	Airdate
29 (3-01)	11 April 2011
30 (3-02)	18 April 2011
31 (3-03)	25 April 2011
32 (3-04)	2 May 2011
33 (3-05)	9 May 2011
34 (3-06)	16 May 2011
35 (3-07)	23 May 2011
36 (3-08)	30 May 2011
37 (3-09)	6 June 2011

=== Season 4 (2011) ===
Glass Home Season 4: The Punishment

No	Airdate
38/39 (4-01/02)	31 October 2011
40/41 (4-03/04)	7 November 2011
42/43 (4-05/06)	14 November 2011
44/45 (4-07/08)	21 November 2011
46/47 (4-09/10)	28 November 2011
48/49 (4-11/12)	5 December 2011
50/51 (4-13/14)	12 December 2011
52/53 (4-15/16)	19 December 2011
54/55 (4-17/18)	26 December 2011

=== Season 5 (2012) ===
Glass Home Season 5: Salvation

No	Airdate
56 (5-01)	16 April 2012
57 (5-02)	23 April 2012
58 (5-03)	30 April 2012
59 (5-04)	7 May 2012
60 (5-05)	14 May 2012
61 (5-06)	21 May 2012
62 (5-07)	28 May 2012
63 (5-08)	4 June 2012
64 (5-09)	11 June 2012

== Broadcasting ==
Bulgaria	bTV	11 April 2010	2012
Turkey	Fox	25 July 2010	-
Croatia	RTL Televizija	11 July 2011	-
Greece	Alpha TV	4 July 2011	-
Macedonia	Kanal 5	1 August 2011	-
Montenegro	Prva TV	23 September 2013	-
Serbia	Prva TV	TBA	-
Bosnia and Herzegovina	ATV / Hayat
Romania	PRO TV -

After being a success in Bulgaria, a few broadcasting networks in the Balkan countries decided to buy the rights for the series. The first one to do so was Kanal D, in Turkey, which bought the right for the series and for future series in Bulgaria, but cancelled it later, because "the series isn't suitable for the Turkish audience". Later, however, FOX Turkey bought the series and started airing it dubbed on 25 July 2010 at 2AM with the name "Sırça Saray". They cancelled it too after the first season. At the beginning of 2011, bTV announced that a deal has been made with four more countries to air the series. They were Croatia (on RTL Televizija), Greece (Alpha TV), Serbia (Prva TV) and Romania (PRO TV). On 4 July, Alpha TV started airing Glass Home, with the name "Γυάλινος Κόσμος". However, the show received low ratings and Alpha TV stopped airing it after only six episodes, on 10 July 2011. In Croatia, the series started in July 2011, and in Serbia and Romania the dates are yet to be announced. Later the same year, bTV announced that Kanal 5 (in Macedonia) has bought the rights for the "Season of the Bulgarian TV Series" (Including Glass Home, Too Many Metropolitans (lit. translation) and 7 hours of time difference (lit. translation) and the most successful Bulgarian film, Mission London (also produced by bTV). Since then, the series has been a big commercial success.
