= Brake to Vacate =

Brake to Vacate (BTV) is additional software planned by Airbus for incorporation on its line of airliners, intended to reduce runway overruns. A more tangible benefit is the increased ability to exit the runway at a specified turnoff point. The European Aviation Safety Agency certified the system, initially for use on the Airbus A380, in 2009. The second Airbus product to incorporate BTV will be the Airbus A320 family, which is much more widely used around the world than the A380. However, an A320 BTV system would be more modest, since its flight computer does not incorporate the extensive electronic architecture of the A380.

== Operation ==
The BTV is a subset of the airliner's auto-flight computer, and allows that computer to be programmed for a pre-selected stopping distance. It indicates (and to some extent directs) which combination of brakes and thrust reversers are required to achieve that distance.

=== On approach ===
The BTV uses the airliner's existing warning systems to alert the crew if unsafe conditions exist. If the system computes that the runway is too short when wet, an amber message appears in the primary flight display. If it computes that the runway is too short even under dry surface conditions, RWY TOO SHORT (in red letters) is flashed on the primary flight display, accompanied by an aural signal.

=== During rollout ===
When the aircraft landing gear is firmly on the runway surface, the BTV combines audio and visual prompts to the flight crew in order to achieve the calculated required deceleration to achieve the designated turnoff point. If BTV senses that the aircraft will overrun the runway end, it automatically applies maximum wheel braking, and it sends an aural message (to the flight crew) to apply maximum reverse thrust, along with a red message in the primary flight display. It continues to call out keep max reverse until the computer figures the desired turnoff point can be achieved at a safe turnoff speed. If the taxiway departs the runway at 90 degrees, the BTV automatically disconnects when the aircraft groundspeed reduces to 10 knots. If the taxiway is a rapid-exit taxiway, the BTV automatically disconnects at 40 to 50 knots groundspeed (depending on conditions).

== Advantages ==
Proponents of the system point out that using BTV will reduce wear on brakes and tires (estimated at 20% reduction over present wear rates), less time that the aircraft spends within the active area of the runway, and enhanced ability to predict required cool-down time on the brakes (and thus to better control minimum gate turnaround time).

The greatest potential advantage of the system is its ability to predict whether an aircraft will be able to stop safely on a specified runway. The pilot selects the runway and enters the reported surface conditions (wind direction, windspeed, wet or dry, cleared or slushy), and the computer uses stored runway information, computed aircraft weights and required approach speeds, and computed flare/touchdown characteristics to predict whether the stopping point will lie outside the runway's endpoint.

== Inputs ==
The flight crew inputs the selected runway, and the reported runway surface conditions. The flight computer updates its calculations using predicted speed and wind conditions until the airplane is 500 feet (150 m) above the surface, after which it uses actual speed and wind inputs.

== Timeline ==
The BTV concept was born in a 1998 Ph.D. thesis by French engineer Fabrice Villaumé, who became head of Airbus' BTV program and who holds patents on the process. Between 2002 and 2006 the computer routines were worked out, and the process was first tested on an Airbus A340, with the first test landing in that aircraft accomplished in March 2005. The first test landing of an A380 using the BTV system was performed in May 2008.

Airbus initially announced its plan to make the BTV system available by 2007, but the production bottlenecks that Airbus encountered in meeting the initial A380 delivery schedules apparently pushed back development of several such planned improvements. As of 2009 the company is seeking certification initially on the A380, after which it will announce planned incorporation schedules for other aircraft in the Airbus airliner product line. In 2006 Airbus indicated that following its introduction on the A380, the BTV "[would] be followed by retrofits available on all of other Airbus aircraft families." However, as of 2009 the company is indicating only that it will work on incorporating the feature on new A320s, and no definite availability schedule has been announced.

In 2005 Airbus also announced its intention to incorporate BTV into the upcoming Airbus A350. However, since then that project has suffered several redesign phases, and it is not clear whether the BTV will still be offered when the A350 does come to market.

As of 2018, the system is indeed incorporated in the Airbus A350.
