= Birgunj Television Channel =

Television channel in Birgunj, Nepal

Birgunj Television
- Country: Nepal
- Broadcast area: Within Nepal
- Headquarters: Birgunj, Nepal

Programming
- Language(s): Nepali; Bhojpuri
- Picture format: 720p HDTV

Ownership
- Owner: Birgunj Television Network Pvt. Ltd.

History
- Launched: 2014

Birgunj Television (commercially abbreviated as BTV) is a small-scale television channel, that is the first ever television channel of Birgunj. It was started in 2013 but was officially released in 2014. It was started with small capital, TV shows and few staffs. Hemant Tamang is known as the prominent producer of BTV.

== Overview ==
BTV basically serves to provide the overall information of Birgunj. It hosts TV shows relevant to the news and condition of Birgunj, peoples' views about the status of Birgunj, notable persons as well as some comedy programmes irrelevant to Birgunj.

The programmes on BTV use simple camera-host style i.e. a cameraman with the programme host(s). BTV has not been able to generate much profit and has been hosting only few ads of companies like Jagadamba and institutions like Birgunj Public College.

== TV shows ==
BTV hosts only a few number of programmes. This list may be incomplete.

- Walk & Talk
- Chalte Chalte
- Hashi ke Tadke
- Hot talk
- Music & More
- SMS Pool

Walk & Talk and Chalte Chalte ( Walk & Talk—Nepali, Chalte Chalte—Bhojpuri) are programmes where the hosts travel Birgunj and talk with people about a certain event. Hashi ke Tadke (English: Waves of Laughter) is a comedy show in Bhojpuri, hosted by a boy and a girl in a studio.

Hot talk features the interview or talking with notable persons or organizations of Birgunj. Music & More is a show that provides information of various song albums and their singers. SMS Pool is based on Facebook messages. Anyone can send messages in their thread and the messages are publicly spoken/displayed. Almost every programme-breaks are followed by a video song. Sometimes, films are also shown on BTV.

== Response ==
BTV got a good response from viewers. Towards the end of 2014 it gained popularity, despite not having generated a good profit, it is spreading its broadcasts almost all over Nepal.

== See also ==
- Kantipur Television
- Nepal Television
