= Binghamton Television =

BTV
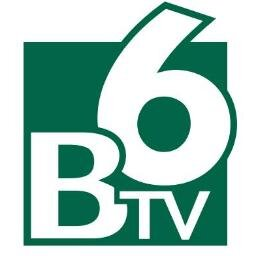
- Binghamton, New York
- Channels: Analog: 6 (CCTV - Cable)
- Branding: BTV-6

History
- Founded: 1976
- Last air date: March 2023
- Former call signs: HTV (Harpur Television Workshop)
- Call sign meaning: Binghamton; TeleVision

Binghamton Television (BTV6) was a television station that operated on the Binghamton University campus. It was broadcast on the Binghamton University's cable network for 41 years.

== History ==
BTV was founded in the late 1970s as Harpur Television Workshop. In 1982, it was renamed to Binghamton Television, when the station began broadcasting to the campus. In the early 2000s, BTV studios moved into a new location below the bookstore on campus. In 2023, it merged with the Cinema Society of Binghamton (CSB) to form the Film & Production Society (FPS).

== Broadcasting ==
BTV is a closed circuit television station and does not fall under the jurisdiction of the Federal Communications Commission. BTV is only available to student's on the Binghamton University campus on channel 6. For others off campus, BTV provides a live stream of the channel on their website.

== Board of Directors ==
2021-2022

President: Sam Nesser
Vice President: Allison Sanel
Production Manager: Zagham Shah
Treasurer: Rojae Manhertz-Patterson
Secretary: Emma Brace
Technical Director: Senih Okuyucu
Editing Director: Sam Gutin
Events Coordinator: Rosemary Interrante

2020-2021

President: Lindsey Rothenberg
Vice President: Marina Sherman
Production Manager: Sam Nesser
Treasurer: Roaje Manhertz-Patterson
Secretary: Alison Sanel
Technical Director: Tyrone Gonzaga
Events Coordinator: Ryan Oates

2020-2021

President: Lindsey Rothenberg
Vice President: Marina Sherman
Production Manager: Sam Nesser
Treasurer: Ian Mills
Secretary: Cailan Dougall
Technical Director: Tyrone Gonzaga
News Director: Ryan Oates
Editing Director: Zagham Shah
Marketing Director: Andrew Gelfars
Events Coordinator: Netanel Hutman

2019-2020

President: William Bodkin
Vice President: Lindsey Rothenberg
Production Manager: Sam Israel
Treasurer: Jackie Kachadourian
Secretary: Marina Sherman

2018-2019

President: Michaël Morganti
Vice President: Andrew Rabinowitz
Production Manager: Lindsey Rothenberg
Treasurer: Jackie Kachadourian
Secretary: Calendra Scahill

Spring 2017

President: Emily Lavin
Vice President: Sarah Rotter
Executive Producer: Jared Fuller
Treasurer: Michaël Morganti

Marketing Director: Mike Mosco
News Director: Brian Racaniello
Editing Director: Jordan Gozinsky
Technical Director: Ian Murray
Administrative & Programming Director: Jackie Kachadourian

Fall 2017

President: Emily Lavin
Vice President: Sarah Rotter
Executive Producer: Jared Fuller
Treasurer: Colleen Stalder

Marketing Director: Mike Mosco
News Director: Brian Racaniello
Editing Director: Jordan Gozinsky
Technical Director: Ian Murray
Administrative & Programming Director: Michaël Morganti
