= Assen Blatechki =

Bulgarian actor and athlete

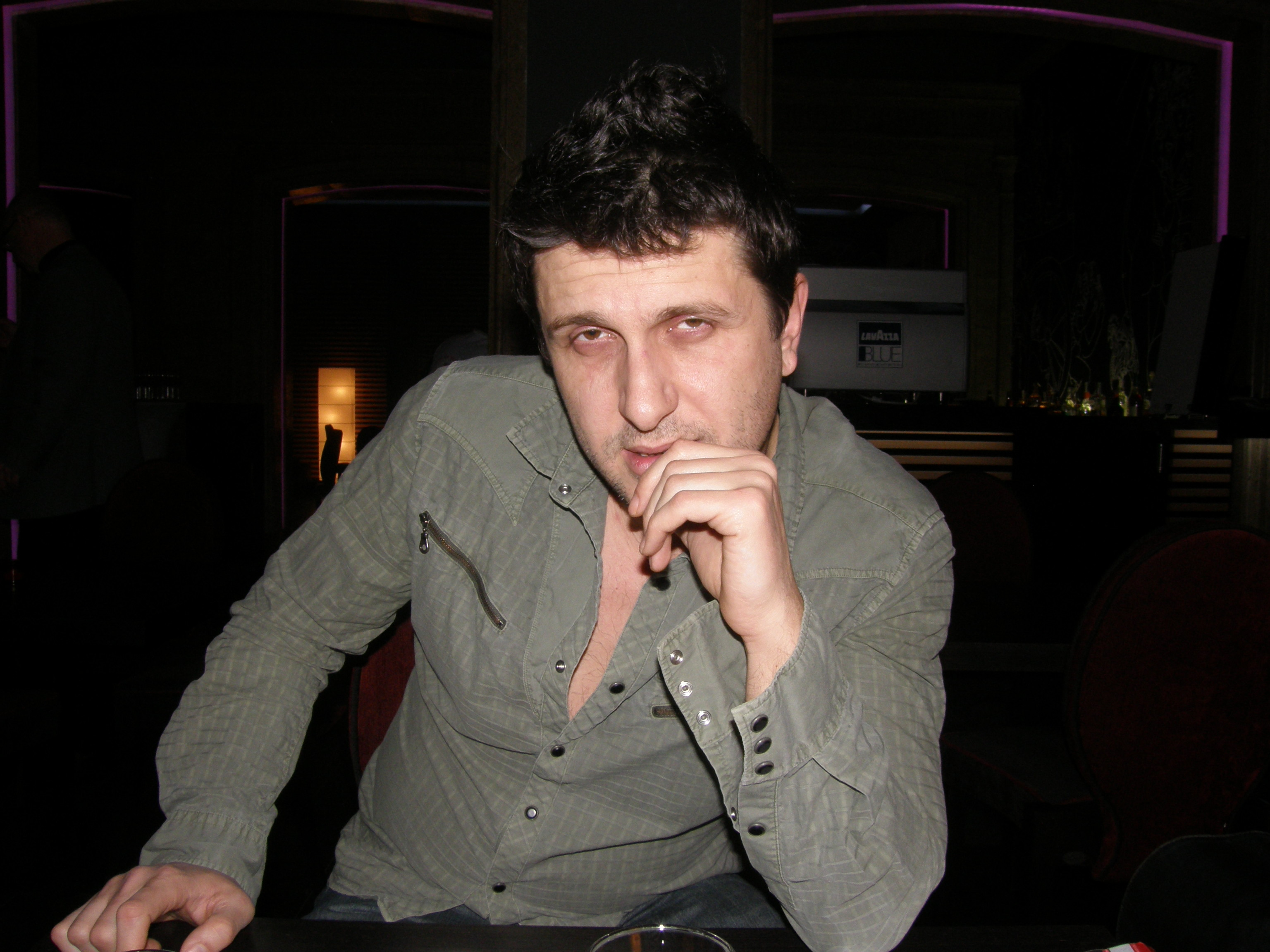
- Blatechki in 2010
- Born: 22 March 1971 (age 55); Sofia, Bulgaria
- Occupation: Actor
- Partner: Katerina Goranova Dilyana Popova
- Children: 2

Assen Emilov Blatechki (Bulgarian: Асен Емилов Блатечки; born 22 March 1971) is a Bulgarian actor.

== Acting and television career ==
Blatechki appeared in a number of Bulgarian films including Steps in the Sand (Bulgarian: Стъпки в пясъка) and The Foreigner (Bulgarian: Чужденецът). He has also taken roles in foreign films.

Blatechki is also a TV presenter and has been a judge on Bulgaria Searches for a Talent.

== Sports achievements ==
Blatechki participated in numerous sports, particularly karate. He was the karate champion of Bulgaria between 1989 and 1992.

== Personal life ==
Blatechki and actress Dilyana Popova have one son. He also has a daughter, Katerina, from his previous marriage to Katerina Goranova.
