= Ring (Bulgaria) =

Bulgarian sports television channel

RING
- Country: Bulgaria
- Network: bTV Media Group
- Headquarters: Sofia, Bulgaria

Programming
- Language: Bulgarian
- Picture format: HDTV 1080i (downscaled to 16:9 576i for the SD feed

Ownership
- Owner: CME (Central European Media Enterprises)
- Sister channels: bTV, bTV Comedy, bTV Cinema, bTV Action, bTV Story

History
- Launched: May 12, 1998
- Former names: Television Ring, Ring +, Ring Plus, RTV, Ring TV, RING.BG, RING

Links
- Website: http://www.ring.bg/

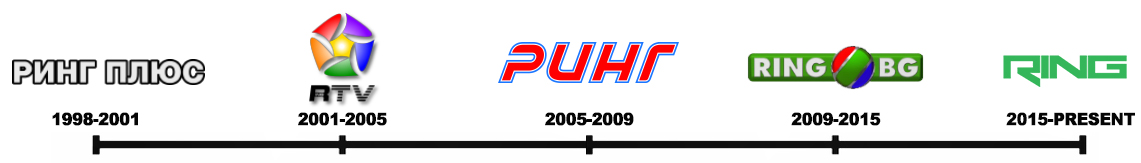
RING is a Bulgarian sports TV channel. It was founded in 1998 by a group of professionals and sports enthusiasts. RING, along with the channels from bTV Media Group (bTV, bTV Comedy, bTV Cinema and bTV Action and bTV Story), is distributed via cable path throughout the country. Over the years, it has used the names Television Ring, Ring +, Ring Plus, RTV, Ring TV, RING.BG, and from 18 August 2015 - simply RING. The channel airs live and recorded football matches of the UEFA Champions League, UEFA Europa League, Serie A, Copa del Rey and others.
