= BTV (Bulgaria) =

Bulgarian television channel

bTV
- Logo used since 2025
- Type: Private
- Country: Bulgaria
- Broadcast area: Bulgaria
- Network: bTV Media Group
- Headquarters: Sofia, Bulgaria

Programming
- Language: Bulgarian
- Picture format: 1080i HDTV; (downscaled to 16:9 576i for the SDTV feed)

Ownership
- Owner: CME (since 2010); Balkan News Corporation (2000–2010)
- Parent: PPF Group (2020–present); WarnerMedia/AT&T (75%) (2010–2020); News Corporation (2000–2010)
- Sister channels: bTV Comedy bTV Cinema bTV Action bTV Story; RING

History
- Launched: 1 June 2000

Links
- Webcast: Watch Live
- Website: www.btv.bg

Availability

Terrestrial
- MUX 2: Channel 2 (SD)

BTV (stylised as bTV) is the first private national television channel in Bulgaria. Owned by bTV Media Group, part of Central European Media Enterprises, and commanding a 37% market share, it is reportedly the television channel with the largest viewing audience in the country.

The network was previously owned by Balkan News Corporation, part of News Corporation. On February 18, 2010, after months of negotiations, News Corp announced that it would sell 94% of bTV (along with bTV Comedy and bTV Cinema) to Central European Media Enterprises. The US$400M deal was completed in the second quarter of 2010.

bTV is broadcast terrestrially in Bulgaria and by satellite internationally. Most of the channel's original content is available on its Internet site. bTV's first broadcast was on 1 June 2000 using BNT transmitters for Efir 2. The channel began broadcasting 24 hours a day on February 18, 2001, after having gradually extended its programming. On October 7, 2012, the channel began broadcasting in HD, while the old SD channel converted to a 16:9 format for most programs.

bTV is the leading channel in the bTV Media Group family, which includes bTV Comedy, bTV Cinema, bTV Action, bTV Story, and RING. The company also owns five local radio stations: bTV Radio, N-JOY, Z-Rock, Classic FM, and Jazz FM.

== History ==
bTV was scheduled to launch on 1 June 2000 with a two-hour schedule. The channel employed a staff of 150 at launch. The airtime was to be increased to six hours from July and eighteen hours from October. Most of the staff and programming was American, hoping to bring local investors. Executive director Albert Parsons had arrived to Bulgaria after assisting in the reorganization process of Fox affiliates WDFX-TV and WPGX, which at the time were owned by Waitt Media.

== Programmes ==
bTV airs reality shows like:

- 3 seasons of 5 stars (under the name 5 zvezdi, 2005–2006)
- 1 season of Beauty and the Geek (under the name Krasavicata i otlichnikat, 2005)
- 7 seasons of Survivor (see Survivor BG, 2006–2009, 2014, 2022–2023)
- 3 seasons of Idol (under the name Music Idol, 2007–2009)
- 3 seasons of Fort Boyard (2008–2010)
- 2 seasons of Psychic Challenge (under the name Yasnovidtsi, 2008–2009)
- 3 seasons of Dancing with the Stars (under the name Dancing Stars, 2008–2009, 2024)
- 2 seasons of Byagstvo kam pobedata (The Amazing Race) (2009, 2024)
- 9 seasons of Got Talent (see Bulgaria's Got Talent, 2010, 2012, 2014–2016, 2019, 2021–2022, 2025)
- 1 season of Lord of the Chefs (2011)
- 12 seasons of The Voice of... (see The Voice of Bulgaria, 2011, 2013–2014, 2017–2024, 2026)
- 1 season of Africa: The Stars Must Be Crazy (under the name Afrika: Zvezdite sigurno sa poludeli, 2013)
- 8 seasons of MasterChef (2015–2021, 2023)
- 10 seasons of The Farm (under the name Fermata, 2015–2023, 2026)
- 8 seasons of Extreme Makeover: Home Edition (under the name Brigada Nov dom, 2016–2021, 2024–present)
- 4 seasons of Wife Swap (under the name Smeni zhenata, 2017–2022)
- 5 seasons of The Bachelor (under the name Ergenat, 2022–present)
- 1 season of Million Dollar Island (under the name Ostrovat na 100-te grivni, 2024)
- 1 season of The Biggest Loser (under the name Zhivot na kantar, 2025)
- 2 seasons of Bachelor in Paradise (under the name Ergenat: Lyubov v raya, 2025–present)
- 2 seasons of The Traitors (under the name Traitors: Igra na predateli, 2025–present)
- 1 season of My Kitchen Rules (under the name Moyata kuhnya e nomer edno, 2026)

and TV games like Are You Smarter Than a 5th Grader? (under the name Tova go znae vsyako hlape" "Every kid knows that", 2007–2009). bTV also broadcast the Bulgarian version of ABC`s show The Dating Game under the name Love games (Gorchivo, 2007–2009). The first season of the Bulgarian version of the slovak TV show Modre Z Neba (Best wishes) was aired in the fall of 2012 under the name Predaj natatak i.e. Pass it on. The first season of the Bulgarian version of the German comedy show Schillerstraße was aired in 2013, under the name Mladost 5, that is the name of a quarter in Sofia. In the fall of 2013 bTV offered the viewers 4 brand new TV shows in primetime - the first season of the Bulgarian version of Star Safari under the name Afrika: zvezdite sigurno sa poludeli (i.e. Africa: the stars must've gone mad), the Bulgarian version of The Price Is Right - That's the price, a new culinary show - A Pinch of Salt (local version of Gordon Ramsay: Cookalong Live) and the Bulgarian version of the Italian comedy show Striscia la notizia under the name The Naked Truth (Golata istina). bTV also produces the Bulgarian versions of My mom cooks better than yours, Hollywood Game Night (under the name Igrite na zvezdite), The Story of my life, The Nikolas Tsitiridis Show from 2020-2023, the Bulgarian version of Who wants to be a millionaire? (Stani Bogat, 2021–).

Popular American TV series such as Monk (all of the seasons), The O.C. (all seasons), Desperate Housewives (seasons 1–6), Ghost Whisperer (seasons 1–3), Grey's Anatomy (seasons 1–6), Battlestar Galactica (all the seasons), Alf (all the seasons), Friends (all seasons), Ally McBeal (all seasons), The Unit (season 1), The 4400 (season 1), American Heiress (all the episodes), The Middle (seasons 1–3), Nikita (seasons 1–2), Pretty Little Liars (seasons 1–2), The Vampire Diaries (seasons 1–3), The Lying Game (all the seasons), Two and a Half Men (seasons 1–9), Dallas (all seasons), Desire (all the episodes) and many others were or are also part of bTV's programme. A lot of Turkish series are still part of the schedule of television. In the Summer of 2011 bTV first aired a Korean series - Iris and in the Summer of 2013 again first aired an Indian soap opera - Sapna Babul Ka...Bidaai and Diya Aur Baati Hum.

One of the most popular bTV show is Slavi's Show. It has been airing from November 27, 2000, to July 31, 2019, every workday from 22:30 to 23:30 EET with the host and producer Slavi Trifonov. The show has 4176 episodes. Other popular bTV shows are Before Noon (an everyday talk-show), The Comedians and friends (a comedy show), Paparazzi, Marmalad (a weekend game show), COOL...T (a lifestyle show) and others. One of the most successful bTV shows is the documentary reality - That's life - it has 12 seasons and is broadcast every Saturday or Sunday afternoon.

bTV News is the most watched newscast in Bulgaria. The first news emission was on the 18th of November 2000. The bTV News is broadcast workdays at 7:00, 8:00, 9:00, 12:00, 17:00, 19:00 and 23:00 EET and at 12:00, 19:00 EET during the weekends. The morning information blocs are This Morning (Monday-Friday), This Saturday (every Saturday), and This Sunday (every Sunday). bTV The Reporters and bTV The Documents are special shows for in-depth investigation and documentary series. bTV The Reporters is broadcast every weekend after of bTV The News airs - around 19:30 EET Other information shows are Face to Face (workdays, 17:30–18:00 EET) and Karbovski: Vtori plan.

The first Bulgarian TV series, produced by bTV was the Bulgarian remake of Un gars, une fille with its local title Her and Him. It has 3 seasons aired on bTV and its last, fourth season, was produced and aired on Fox Life. bTV also airs other home-made Bulgarian series like Glass Home with its 5 seasons. Its producer was SIA and Dimitar Mitovski. Other Bulgarian TV series, produced by bTV are Citizens in more, Seven Hours Difference, House Arrest, Where is Magi? (a remake of ¿Dónde Está Elisa?), Revolution Z, The Family, Relations and Where is My Elder Brother? and Rakia Sunrise (as part of The Slavi Show).

== bTV International ==
bTV International was launched on June 2, 2016 as part of the bTV family. The channel is aimed at the Bulgarian audience abroad. Its broadcast is available through the video content platform Voyo.bg. The online broadcast of the channel continues until the end of 2022.

The programming includes bTV News, "This Morning", "Before Noon", "Face to Face", "120 Minutes", "The Strangers", bTV Documents, "This Saturday" and "This Sunday". Bulgarian television series also form part of bTV Media Group's programming, including "Glass House", "Sofia Residents in Excess", "Seven Hours Difference" and "House Arrest".
