= BTV Story =

Bulgarian television channel

bTV Story
- Type: Private
- Country: Bulgaria
- Network: bTV Media Group
- Headquarters: Sofia, Bulgaria Sq. 1

Programming
- Language(s): Bulgarian
- Picture format: 16:9 (1080i HD; 576i SD)

Ownership
- Owner: CME
- Sister channels: bTV; bTV Comedy; bTV Cinema; bTV Action; RING

History
- Launched: 28 January 2012
- Former names: bTV Lady (2012 – 2023)

Links
- Website: www.btv.bg/story

bTV Story is a Bulgarian female-oriented television channel. The channel is part of the bTV Media Group, owned by the American media conglomerate CME (Central European Media Enterprises). It began broadcasting on 28 January 2012.

The channel airs shows such as The Dr. Oz Show, The Nate Berkus Show, and the Victoria's Secret Fashion Show. Part of the programming scheme of the channel are reality and talk show programs, Turkish, Indian, South Korean and Latin American telenovelas, programs on health, beauty, home care, family and garden, American series and romantic films. Since March 2012, the program "Mommy's Hour", which until years ago was broadcast on bTV, is being renewed. The channel also broadcasts repeats of some bTV shows - Zvezdev's Kitchen, Predi obed, Moderno, The Globe, The Spirit of Health, and since September 2012 the Bulgarian series "Where is Maggie?".

In March 2012, television broadcast the Grammy Awards and the American Music Awards. Since 2013, it has also been broadcasting the Miss Universe pageant.

From 7 October 2012, channel switches to broadcasting with the 16:9 SD picture format. Since 1 January 2016, bTV Story has been broadcast on bTV Media Group's paid online platform – VOYO in HD quality, and since 6 July 2018 – on cable networks in HD quality.

In November 2023, it was announced that bTV Lady was about to change its name to bTV Story.

On 11 December 2023, bTV Lady was officially rebranded as bTV Story.

== Logos ==
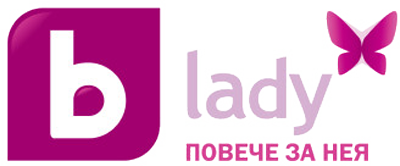
bTV Lady logo between 2012 and 2016

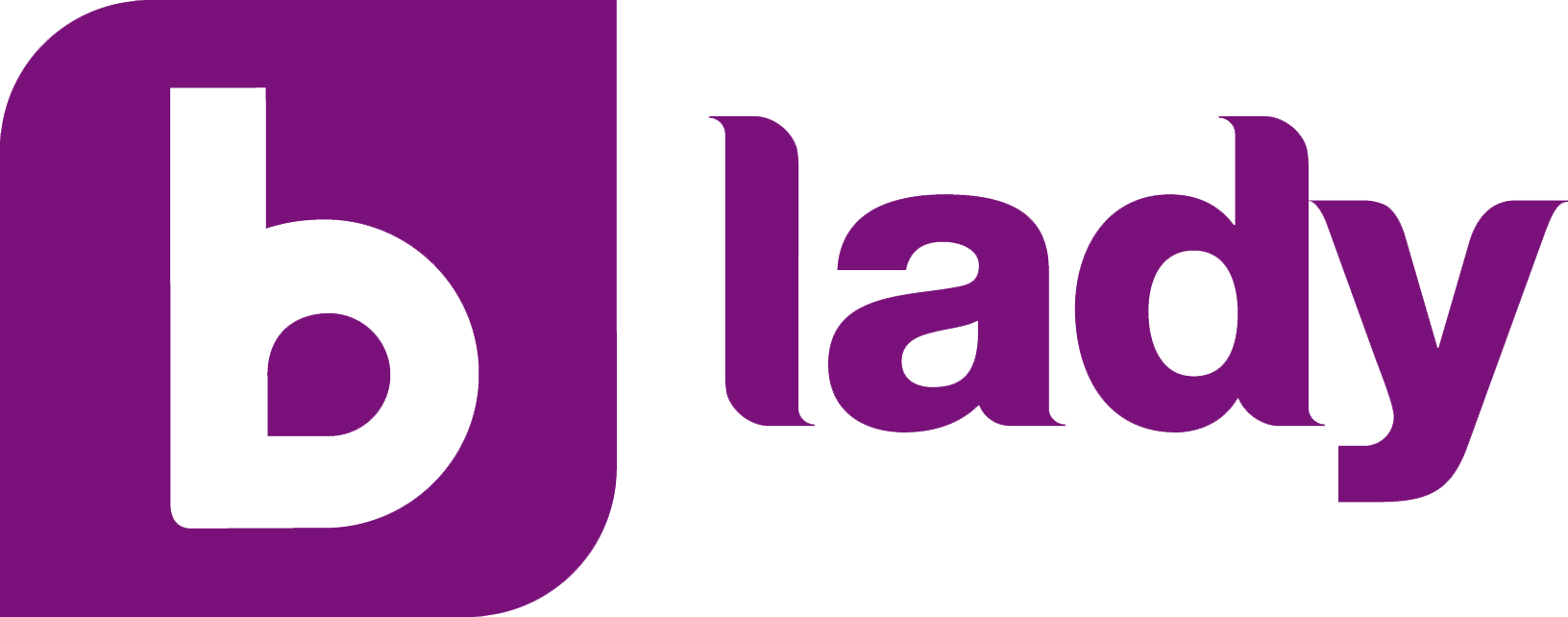
bTV Lady logo between 2016 and 2023

bTV Story logo from 2023
