= Jazz FM (Bulgaria) =

Coordinates: 42.70°N 23.33°E

Sofia; Bulgaria
- Frequency: 104 MHz

Programming
- Format: Jazz

Ownership
- Owner: Central European Media Enterprises

History
- First air date: September 17, 2001

Technical information

Links
- Webcast: Listen Live
- Website: jazzfm.bg

Radio Jazz FM is a jazz radio station in Bulgaria that started in 2001. It is part of BTV Media Group, which is owned by Central European Media Enterprises. From 2001 to 2006 it aired in Plovdiv, Varna, Burgas, Blagoevgrad, Ruse, Stara Zagora, and Sofia. In its first years, it aired special projects with Radio Net and Sport Radio. Starting in 2005 the radio aired the Doiche Vele news. In 2006, N-JOY replaced the radio in all cities except Sofia.
