= Parsauni =

Coordinates: 27.5833°N 84.0000°E

Parsauni पर्सौनी
- Village development committee
- Location in Nepal Parsauni (Nepal)
- Country: Nepal
- Zone: Lumbini Zone
- District: Nawalparasi District

Population (1991)
  - Total: 4,709
- Time zone: UTC+5:45 (Nepal Time)

Parsauni is a village development committee in Nawalparasi District in the Lumbini Zone of southern Nepal. At the time of the 2001 Nepal census it had a population of 6000 people living in 850 individual households.
