= BTV Action =

Bulgarian television network

bTV Action
- Country: Bulgaria
- Broadcast area: Bulgaria
- Network: bTV Media Group
- Headquarters: Sofia, Bulgaria

Programming
- Language: Bulgarian
- Picture format: HDTV 1080i (downscaled to 16:9 576i for the SD feed

Ownership
- Owner: CME (Central European Media Enterprises)
- Sister channels: bTV, bTV Comedy, bTV Cinema, bTV Story, RING

History
- Launched: 1998 (as TOP TV); 2006 (as CTN); 2007 (as TV2); 2009 (as PRO.BG); 2011 (as bTV Action)
- Former names: TOP TV (1998-2004); CTN (Bulgaria) (2006-2007); TV2 (2007-2009); PRO.BG (2009-2011)

Links
- Website: http://www.btv.bg/action

bTV Action is a Bulgarian man-based television channel. The channel, along with sports channel RING, bTV, bTV Comedy, bTV Cinema and bTV Story are part of bTV Media Group, owned by Central European Media Enterprises (CME).

== History ==
In 1998 was launched the first Bulgarian ethereal television - TOP TV. Later the television extended its coverage, but it was shut off in 2004. The company was bought in 2005 and in 2006 the television started as CTN. One year later, in 2007, it was re-bought and re-branded to TV2. The channel was bought by Central European Media Enterprises with the sports television Ring TV in 2008 and re-branded as PRO.BG in 2009. This re-branding is believed to be inspired by Romania's largest TV channel PRO TV, also owned by Central European Media Enterprises (CME) as the founder of this channel Adrian Sarbu became the CEO of CME. The channel was then re-branded as bTV Action when CME bought "bTV Media Group" (bTV, bTV Comedy and bTV Cinema) in 2010. Since 7 October 2012 the format of the picture is set to 16:9 and an HD multiplex was launched.

== Programme ==
bTV Action is a men-oriented channel showing actual programs, sports and action films

The channel, along with RING broadcasts the UEFA Champions League, and with BNT 1 and RING the UEFA Europa League, Italian Serie A1, Men's European Volleyball Championship and more in HD. In 2013. the final of the UEFA Champions League was aired in 3D. The first 3D to be aired in the Bulgarian television. Later same year the channel starts to show the qualification and the races from the Deutsche Tourenwagen Masters (DTM) and since August 2013 also airs The Italian Serie A together with RING.

Code: Criminal is a criminal show which is being broadcast Monday-Friday live from 20:00 EET to 21:00 EET. The Hounds is a provocative investigate show with reality reports, comments, discussions and social experiments. It is broadcast at the weekend from 20:00 EET to 21:00 EET. Sport Zone is a sport commentary show. It was first broadcast on the main channel bTV and then it started on bTV Action - every Sunday from 12:30 EET to 13:30 EET. 24/7 is a commentary show with Dimitar Tsonev - one of the most famous Bulgarian journalists. It is broadcast from October 2011 till July 2012 every Sunday form 21:00 EET to 22:00 EET, because from September 2012 Dimitar Tsonev has new show, broadcast on the main channel bTV.

== Coverage ==
PRO.BG was broadcast via analogue transmission in the largest 27 cities and towns in Bulgaria, which in effect covers more than 70% of Bulgaria's population. The channel shut-off its terrestrial broadcasting on 1 December 2010. bTV Action is broadcast via cable & satellite transmission from 22 January 2011. It is expected to resume its terrestrial broadcasting in near future.
