= N-Joy (Bulgarian radio station) =

Coordinates: 42.697439°N 23.336140°E

N-JOY

Ownership
- Owner: Central European Media Enterprises

History
- First air date: 1 June 2006

Links
- Website: http://www.njoy.bg/

Radio N-JOY is a Bulgarian radio station, launched in 2006. It is the main radio station of BTV Media Group owned by Central European Media Enterprises, a subsidiary of PPF Group N.V. It broadcasts music (new pop, rock and dance music), news, games and discussion to 21 towns and cities in Bulgaria,and is receivable across Europe via satellite.

== Frequencies ==
N-JOY frequencies
City	Frequency
Sofia	106.9 MHz
Pernik	107.0 MHz
Plovdiv	102.0 MHz
Varna	90.6 MHz
Burgas	101.8 MHz
Veliko Tarnovo	89.8 MHz
Stara Zagora	106.2 MHz
Ruse	101.6 MHz
Blagoevgrad	103.9 MHz
Haskovo	89.5 MHz
Razgrad	106.9 MHz
Gabrovo	107.4 MHz
Montana	95.2 MHz
Balchik	105.4 MHz
Teteven	105.8 MHz
Jablanica	100.5 MHz
Karlovo	107.8 MHz
Karnobat	100.5 MHz
Razlog	97.1 MHz
Bansko	97.1 MHz
Troyan	103.8 MHz
Apriltsi	107.8 MHz
Velingrad	93.0 MHz
Aytos	90.0 MHz
Byala, Rousse Province	95.2 MHz
Gotse Delchev (town)	91.6 MHz
Levski	92.7 MHz
Lovech	103.8 MHz
Nessebar	87.6 MHz
Obzor	107.9 MHz
Pazardzhik	92.7 MHz
Primorsko	100.6 MHz
Tryavna	91.5 MHz
Yambol	104.2 MHz
