= List of submissions to the 76th Academy Awards for Best Foreign Language Film =

2003 Best Foreign Language Film submissions
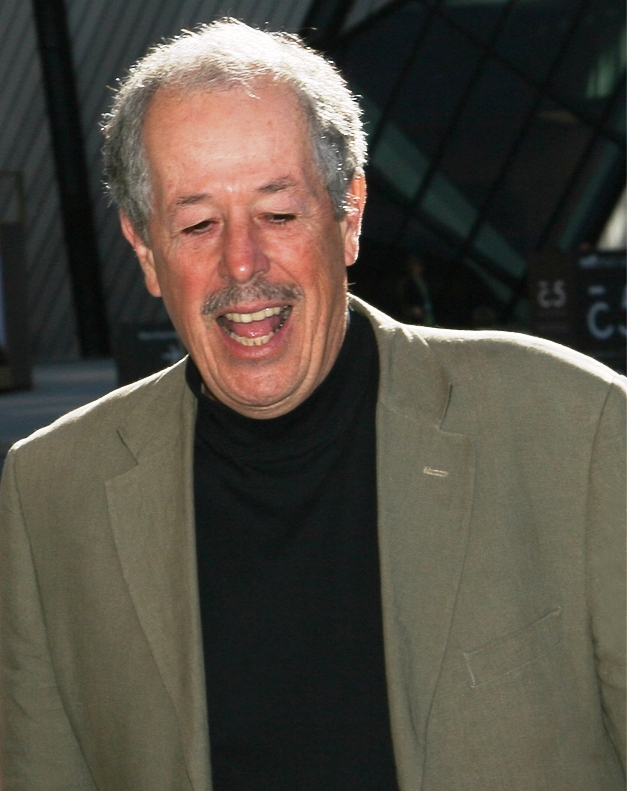
- Denys Arcand directed The Barbarian Invasions, which won the year's award.

Highlights
- Oscar winner: (Canada) The Barbarian Invasions
- Submissions: 56
- Debuts: 2
- Total eligible: 56

This is a list of submissions to the 76th Academy Awards for the Best Foreign Language Film. The Academy of Motion Picture Arts and Sciences (AMPAS) has invited the film industries of various countries to submit their best film for the Academy Award for Best Foreign Language Film every year since the award was created in 1956. The award is presented annually by the Academy to a feature-length motion picture produced outside the United States that contains primarily non-English dialogue. The Foreign Language Film Award Committee oversees the process and reviews all the submitted films.

For the 76th Academy Awards, the submitted motion pictures must have first been released theatrically in their respective countries between 1 November 2002 and 30 September 2003. The deadline for submissions to the Academy was 1 October 2003. 56 countries submitted films and were found to be eligible by AMPAS and screened for voters. Mongolia and Sri Lanka submitted films for the first time, and Palestine resubmitted its film disqualified from last year's list. The five nominees were announced on 27 January 2004.

Canada won the award for the first time with The Barbarian Invasions by Denys Arcand, which was also nominated for Best Original Screenplay.

== Submissions ==
Submitting country	Film title used in nomination	Original title	Language(s)	Director(s)	Result
Afghanistan	Osama	أسامة	Dari, Pashto, English, French, Arabic	Siddiq Barmak	Not nominated
Argentina	Valentín		Spanish	Alejandro Agresti	Not nominated
Armenia	Vodka Lemon	Վոդկա լիմոն / Vodka Lîmon / Водка Лимон	Armenian, Northern Kurdish, Russian, French	Hiner Saleem	Not nominated
Austria	Free Radicals	Böse Zellen	Viennese German	Barbara Albert	Not nominated
Belgium	Sea of Silence	Verder dan de maan	Dutch	Stijn Coninx	Not nominated
Bolivia	Sexual Dependency	Dependencia sexual	Spanish, English, Brazilian Portuguese	Rodrigo Bellott	Not nominated
Bosnia and Herzegovina	Fuse	Gori vatra	Bosnian, Serbian, English	Pjer Žalica	Not nominated
Brazil	Carandiru		Brazilian Portuguese	Héctor Babenco	Not nominated
Bulgaria	Journey to Jerusalem	Пътуване към Йерусалим	Bulgarian, German	Ivan Nitchev	Not nominated
Canada	The Barbarian Invasions	Les Invasions barbares	French, English	Denys Arcand	Won Academy Award
Chile	The Debutantes	Los debutantes	Spanish	Andrés Waissbluth	Not nominated
China	Warriors of Heaven and Earth	天地英雄	Mandarin, Japanese	He Ping	Not nominated
Colombia	The First Night	La primera noche	Spanish	Luis Alberto Restrepo	Not nominated
Croatia	Witnesses	Svjedoci	Croatian	Vinko Brešan	Not nominated
Cuba	Havana Suite	Suite Habana	No dialogue	Fernando Pérez	Not nominated
Czech Republic	Želary		Czech, Russian, German, English	Ondřej Trojan	Nominated
Denmark	Reconstruction		Danish, Swedish	Christoffer Boe	Not nominated
Egypt	Sleepless Nights	سهر الليالى	Arabic	Hani Khalifa	Not nominated
Finland	Elina: As If I Wasn't There	Elina - Som om jag inte fanns / Näkymätön Elina	Meänkieli, Swedish	Klaus Härö	Not nominated
France	Bon Voyage		French, German, English, Italian	Jean-Paul Rappeneau	Not nominated
Germany	Good Bye, Lenin!		German, English, Russian	Wolfgang Becker	Not nominated
Greece	Think It Over	Θα το Μετανιώσεις	Greek	Katerina Evangelakou	Not nominated
Hong Kong	Infernal Affairs	無間道	Cantonese, English, Mandarin, Thai	Andrew Lau and Alan Mak	Not nominated
Hungary	Forest	Rengeteg	Hungarian	Benedek Fliegauf	Not nominated
Iceland	Noi the Albino	Nói albinói	Icelandic, French	Dagur Kári	Not nominated
Indonesia	The Stringless Violin	Biola Tak Berdawai	Indonesian	Sekar Ayu Asmara	Not nominated
Iran	Deep Breath	نفس عمیق	Persian	Parviz Shahbazi	Not nominated
Israel	Nina's Tragedies	האסונות של נינה	Hebrew	Savi Gabizon	Not nominated
Italy	I'm Not Scared	Io non ho paura	Italian	Gabriele Salvatores	Not nominated
Japan	The Twilight Samurai	たそがれ清兵衛	Shonai Japanese	Yoji Yamada	Nominated
Lebanon	The Kite	Le cerf-volant / طيّارة من ورق	Arabic, Hebrew	Randa Chahal	Not nominated
Luxembourg	I Always Wanted to Be a Saint	J'ai toujours voulu être une sainte	French	Geneviève Mersch	Not nominated
Mexico	Aro Tolbukhin	Aro Tolbukhin: en la mente del asesino	Spanish, Hungarian, Catalan	Isaac Pierre Racine, Lydia Zimmermann, and Agustí Villaronga	Not nominated
Mongolia	The Story of the Weeping Camel	Ингэний нулимс	Khalkha Mongolian	Byambasuren Davaa and Luigi Falorni	Not nominated
Nepal	Muna Madan	मुनामदन	Nepali	Gyanendra Deuja	Not nominated
Netherlands	Twin Sisters	De Tweeling	Dutch, German	Ben Sombogaart	Nominated
Norway	Kitchen Stories	Salmer fra kjøkkenet	Norwegian, Swedish	Bent Hamer	Not nominated
Palestine	Divine Intervention	يد إلهية	Arabic, Hebrew, English	Elia Suleiman	Not nominated
Peru	Paper Dove	Paloma de papel	Spanish	Fabrizio Aguilar	Not nominated
Philippines	The '70s	Dekada '70	Filipino, English	Chito S. Roño	Not nominated
Poland	Pornography	Pornografia	Polish	Jan Jakub Kolski	Not nominated
Portugal	A Talking Picture	Um Filme Falado	Portuguese, French, Italian, Greek, English	Manoel de Oliveira	Not nominated
Russia	The Return	Возвращение	Russian	Andrei Zvyagintsev	Not nominated
Serbia and Montenegro	The Professional	Професионалац	Serbian	Dušan Kovačević	Not nominated
Slovakia	King of Thieves	König der Diebe	German, Ukrainian	Ivan Fíla	Not nominated
Slovenia	Spare Parts	Rezervni deli	Slovene, Croatian, English	Damjan Kozole	Not nominated
South Korea	Spring, Summer, Fall, Winter... and Spring	봄, 여름, 가을, 겨울 그리고 봄	Korean	Kim Ki-duk	Not nominated
Spain	Soldiers of Salamina	Soldados de Salamina	Spanish, Catalan, French	David Trueba	Not nominated
Sweden	Evil	Ondskan	Swedish, Finnish	Mikael Håfström	Nominated
Sri Lanka	Mansion by the Lake	වෑකන්ද වලව්ව	Sinhala	Lester James Peries	Not nominated
Taiwan	Goodbye, Dragon Inn	不散	Mandarin, Taiwanese Hokkien, Japanese	Tsai Ming-Liang	Not nominated
Thailand	Last Life in the Universe	เรื่องรัก น้อยนิด มหาศาล	Thai, Japanese, English	Pen-ek Ratanaruang	Not nominated
Turkey	Distant	Uzak	Turkish	Nuri Bilge Ceylan	Not nominated
Ukraine	Mamay	Мамай	Ukrainian, Crimean Tatar	Oles Sanin	Not nominated
Uruguay	Seawards Journey	El viaje hacia el mar	Spanish	Guillermo Casanova	Not nominated
Venezuela	Sangrador		Spanish	Leonardo Henríquez	Not nominated

== Notes ==
- Armenia submitted Vodka Lemon by Huner Saleem, but it was not originally accepted by the Academy, who said that Armenia had not proven that they had creative control over the film. The film was later accepted and screened alongside all the other films.
- The Film Federation of India announced that their selection committee had been unable to find a suitable film to send to the Oscars and so declined to send an entry. This left India out of the race for the first time in over a decade.
- Palestine submitted Divine Intervention by Elia Suleiman the year before. However AMPAS ruled that Palestine was not a country and had no recognized Film Board. The Academy subsequently changed its mind saying that although Palestine was not a recognized country, they would make an exception" in the interests of inclusiveness.
