= Survivor BG: The Hidden Idol =

- Season 6
- Presented by: Vladimir Karamazov
- No. of days: 43
- No. of castaways: 20
- Winner: Zoran Petrovski
- Runners-up: Ganka Stateva; Karin Okolie
- Location: Philippines
- No. of episodes: 30

Release
- Original network: bTV
- Original release: 21 February – 27 April 2022

Season chronology
- ← Previous; Survivor BG: Fans vs Favorites Next → Survivor BG 7

Survivor BG: The Hidden Idol was the sixth season of the Bulgarian reality television series of Survivor BG.

The season had 20 contestants competed in tribes facing off against each other in the Philippines where they competed for rewards and immunity to avoid being eliminated themselves.

After 43 days, the jury decided Zoran Petrovski to win 150,000 leva and the title of Sole Survivor.

The series returned after being off-air for 8 years with Vladimir Karamazov returned to present the series.

The season premiered on 21 February 2022 on bTV.

The season final was aired on 27 April 2022 on bTV with Zoran Petrovski winning 150,000 leva and the title of Sole Survivor.

== Contestants ==
Contestant	Original Tribe	First Switched Tribe	Second Switched Tribe	Merged Tribe	Main Game	Redemption Island	Finish
Peyo Georgiev; 43, Troyan	Ifugao				2nd Voted Out; Day 4	Lost Duel 1 Day 6	20th
Ilian Vassilev; 37, Sofia	Bontoc				3rd Voted Out; Day 7	Lost Duel 2 Day 9	19th
Margarita Chaneva; 36, Sofia	Bontoc	Bontoc			4th Voted Out; Day 10	Lost Duel 3 Day 12	18th
Ivaylo Krusharski; 28, Sofia	Ifugao	Bontoc			Left Competition; Day 13		17th
Milev Kutelov; 33, Haskovo/Sofia	Ifugao	Bontoc			5th Voted Out; Day 13	Lost Duel 4 Day 15	16th
Ivana Mikova; 43, Sofia	Ifugao				1st Voted Out; Day 2	Lost Duel 5 Day 18	15th
Georgi Petkov; 24, Sofia	Bontoc	Ifugao			7th Voted Out; Day 19	Lost Duel 6 Day 21	14th
Ivan Uzunov; 26, Blagoevgrad	Bontoc	Bontoc	Ifugao		8th Voted Out; Day ?	Lost Duel 7 Day ?	13th
Dragomir Methodiev; Returned to game	Ifugao	Ifugao			6th Voted Out; Day 16	1st Returnee	
Ioana Varbichkova; 34, Glasgow, Scotland	Bontoc	Bontoc	Bontoc	Mappurondo	10th Voted Out; 1st Jury Member; Day ?	Lost Duel 8 Day ?	12th
Djuliana Butrakova; 22, Pazardzhik	Ifugao	Ifugao	Nameless	Mappurondo	11th Voted Out; 2nd Jury Member; Day ?	Lost Duel 9 Day ?	11th
Dragomir Methodiev; 46, Sofia	Ifugao	Ifugao		Mappurondo	12th Voted Out; 3rd Jury Member; Day ?	Lost Duel 10; Day ?	10th
Mila Savova; 31, Varna	Ifugao	Bontoc	Nameless	Mappurondo	9th Voted Out; 4th Jury Member; Day ?	Lost Duel 11; Day ?	9th
Aleksandra Petrova; 35, Pleven	Bontoc	Ifugao	Nameless	Mappurondo	14th Voted Out; 5th Jury Member; Day ?	Lost Duel 12; Day ?	8th
Denis Hristoforov; 24, Sofia	Ifugao	Bontoc	Nameless	Mappurondo	15th Voted Out; 6th Jury Member; Day ?	Lost Duel 13; Day ?	7th
Ganka Stateva; Returned to game	Ifugao	Ifugao	Ifugao	Mappurondo	13th Voted Out; Day ?	2nd Returnee	
Ivan Georgiev; 32, Sofia	Bontoc	Ifugao	Bontoc	Mappurondo	Lost challenge 7th Jury Member; Day 41		6th
Borislava Varbanova; 29, Plovdiv	Bontoc	Bontoc	Bontoc	Mappurondo	Lost challenge 8th Jury Member; Day 42		5th
Anelia Shtereva; 21, Sofia	Ifugao	Ifugao	Ifugao	Mappurondo	Lost challenge 9th Jury Member; Day 43		4th
Karin Okolie; 27, Sofia	Bontoc	Ifugao	Ifugao	Mappurondo	2nd Runner-up		3rd
Ganka Stateva; 25, Sofia	Ifugao	Ifugao	Ifugao	Mappurondo	Runner-up		2nd
Zoran Petrovski; 39, Skopje, North Macedonia	Bontoc	Bontoc	Bontoc	Mappurondo	Sole Survivor		1st

== Challenges ==
=== Tribal Phase ===
Episode	Air date	Challenges		Voted out	Vote	Finish	Redemption duel	
Episode	Air date	Reward	Immunity	Voted out	Vote	Finish	Winner	Eliminated
Episode 1	21 February 2022	Bontoc	Bontoc	Ivana	8-2	1st Voted Out; Day 2	None	
Episode 2	22 February 2022	Bontoc		Peyo	5-2-2	2nd Voted Out; Day 4	None	
Episode 3	23 February 2022	Bontoc	None	None	None	Lost duel 1 Day 6	Ivana	Peyo
Episode 4	28 February 2022	None	Ifugao	Ilian	5-3-1	3rd Voted Out; Day 7	None	
Episode 5	1 March 2022	Bontoc	None	None	None	Lost duel 2 Day 9	Ivana	Ilian
Episode 6	2 March 2022	None	Ifugao	Margarita	4-3-0	4th Voted Out; Day 10	None	
Episode 7	7 March 2022	Bontoc	None	None	None	Lost duel 3 Day 13	Ivana	Margarita
Episode 8	8 March 2022	None	Ifugao	Ivaylo	None	Left Competition; Day 13	None	
Episode 8	8 March 2022	None	Ifugao	Milen	5-1	5th Voted Out; Day 13	None	
Episode 9	9 March 2022	Ifugao	None	None	None	Lost duel 4 Day 15	Ivana	Milen
Episode 10	14 March 2022	None	Bontoc	Dragomir	4-1	6th Voted Out; Day 16	None	
Episode 11	15 March 2022	Bontoc	None	None	None	Lost duel 5 Day 18	Dragomir	Ivana
Episode 12	16 March 2022	None	Bontoc	Georgi	4-2	7th Voted Out; Day 19	None	
Episode 13	21 March 2022	Ifugao	None	None	None	Lost duel 6 Day 21	Dragomir	Georgi
Episode 14	22 March 2022	None	Nameless	Ivan U.	Challenge	8th Voted Out; Day ?	None	
Episode 15	23 March 2022	None		None	None	Lost duel 7 Day ?	Dragomir (Note: Returned to the game upon winning the Redemption Island challenge.)	Ivan U.

=== Individual Phase ===
Episode	Air date	Challenges		Voted out	Vote	Finish	Redemption duel	
Episode	Air date	Reward	Immunity	Voted out	Vote	Finish	Winner	Eliminated
Episode 16	28 March 2022	None	Dragomir	Mila	6-3-2-1	9th Voted Out; Day ?	None	
Episode 17	29 March 2022	None	Djuliana	Ioana	6-5	10th Voted Out; Day ?	None	
Episode 18	30 March 2022	Borislava	None	None	None	Lost duel 8 Day ?	Mila	Ioana
Episode 19	4 April 2022	None	Karin	Djuliana	6-2-1	11th Voted Out; Day ?	None	
Episode 20	5 April 2022	Anelia	None	None	None	Lost duel 9 Day ?	Mila	Djuliana
Episode 21	6 April 2022	None	Anelia	Dragomir	3-1-0	12th Voted Out; Day ?	None	
Episode 22	11 April 2022	Survivor; Auction	None	None	None	Lost duel 10; Day ?	Mila	Dragomir
Episode 23	12 April 2022	None	Zoran	Ganka	3-0	13th Voted Out; Day ?	None	
Episode 24	13 April 2022	Anelia	None	None	None	Lost duel 11; Day ?	Ganka	Mila
Episode 25	18 April 2022	None	Zoran	Aleksandra	5-1	14th Voted Out; Day ?	None	
Episode 26	19 April 2022	Zoran	None	None	None	Lost duel 12; Day ?	Ganka	Aleksandra
Episode 27	20 April 2022	None	Zoran	Denis	2-1	15th Voted Out; Day ?	None	
Episode 28	25 April 2022	None	None	None	None	Lost duel 13; Day ?	Ganka	Denis
Episode 28	25 April 2022	None	Karin	Ivan G.	Challenge	Lost Challenge; Day 41	None	
Episode 29	26 April 2022	None	Ganka	Borislava	Challenge	Lost Challenge; Day 42	None	
Episode 29	26 April 2022	None	Zoran	Anelia	Challenge	Lost Challenge; Day 43	None	
Episode 30	27 April 2022	Jury Vote		Karin	7-2-0	2nd Runner-up	None	
Episode 30	27 April 2022	Jury Vote		Ganka	7-2-0	Runner-up	None	
Episode 30	27 April 2022	Jury Vote		Zoran	7-2-0	Sole Survivor	None	

== Voting History ==
=== Tribal Phase ===
#	Original Tribe			First Switched Tribe						Second Switched Tribe
Episode	1	2	4	6	8		10		12	14
Voted out	Ivana	Peyo	Ilian	Margarita	Ivaylo	Milen	Tie	Dragomir	Georgi	Ivan U.
Votes	8-2	5-2-2	5-3-1	4-3-0	Quit	5-1	2-2-0	4-1	4-2	Challenge
Zoran			Immune	Ivan U.		Immune				Ivan G.
Ganka	Ivana	Peyo					Dragomir	Dragomir	Georgi	Ivan U.
Karin			Ilian				~~Aleksandra~~	Dragomir	Djuliana	None
Anelia	Ivana	Peyo					Dragomir	None	Georgi	Ivan U.
Borislava			Ilian	Margarita		Milen				Zoran
Ivan G.			Ilian				~~Aleksandra~~	Dragomir	Georgi	Zoran
Denis	Ivana	Peyo		Margarita		Milen				
Aleksandra			Georgi				Anelia	Anelia	Immune	
Mila	Ivana	Peyo		Immune		Milen				
Dragomir	Ivana	Ivaylo					Anelia	None		
Djuliana	Ivana	Ganka					Immune	None	Georgi	
Ioana			Ilian	Margarita		Milen				None
Ivan U.			Georgi	Margarita		Milen				Karin
Georgi			Ilian				~~Aleksandra~~	Dragomir	Djuliana	
Ivana	Peyo									
Milen	Ivana	Ivaylo		~~Ivaylo~~		Denis				
Ivaylo	Peyo	Peyo		Ivan U.						
Margarita			Georgi	Ivan U.						
Ilian			Ivan G							
Peyo	Ivana	Ganka								

=== Individual Phase ===
#	Merged Tribe								Jury Vote		
Episode	16	17	19	21	23	25	27		30		
Voted out	Mila	Ioana	Djuliana	Dragomir	Ganka	Aleksandra	Tie	Denis	Karin	Ganka	Zoran
Votes	6-3-2-1	6-5	6-2-1	3-1-0	3-0	5-1	2-2-0	2-1	7-2-0		
Zoran	Mila	Aleksandra	Djuliana	Dragomir	Ganka	Aleksandra	Denis	Denis	Jury Vote		
Ganka	Djuliana	Ioana	Djuliana	Zoran	~~Denis~~				Jury Vote		
Karin	Djuliana	Ioana	Djuliana	~~Borislava~~	~~Denis~~	Aleksandra	~~Borislava~~	None	Jury Vote		
Anelia	Djuliana	Ioana	Djuliana	Dragomir	Immune	Aleksandra	Denis	Denis			Zoran
Borislava	Mila	Aleksandra	Djuliana	Dragomir	Ganka	Immune	Karin	Karin			Zoran
Ivan G.	Denis	Aleksandra	Djuliana	~~Borislava~~	~~Denis~~	Aleksandra	Immune	None			Zoran
Denis	Mila	Aleksandra	Immune	Immune	Ganka	Aleksandra	Karin	None			Zoran
Aleksandra	Mila	Ioana	Zoran	~~Borislava~~	~~Denis~~	Denis				Ganka	
Mila	Aleksandra									Ganka	
Dragomir	Denis	Ioana	Borislava	~~Borislava~~							Zoran
Djuliana	Mila	Ioana	Zoran								Zoran
Ioana	Mila	Aleksandra									Zoran
Ivan U.											
Georgi											
Ivana											
Milen											
Ivaylo											
Margaritha											
Ilian											
Peyo											
