= Stefan Popov =

Stefan Popov may refer to:

- Stefan Popov (musician), Bulgarian cellist
- Stefan Popov (actor), Bulgarian actor
