= Survivor BG 7 =

- Season 7
- Presented by: Vanja Džaferović
- No. of days: 70
- No. of castaways: 24
- Winner: Blagoy Georgiev
- Runners-up: Ermina Boyanova; Danail Stoyanov
- Location: Dominican Republic
- No. of episodes: 30

Release
- Original network: bTV
- Original release: 18 February – 16 May 2023

Season chronology
- ← Previous; Survivor BG: The Hidden Idol

Survivor BG 7 was the seventh season of the Bulgarian reality television series of Survivor BG.

The season had 24 contestants competed in tribes facing off against each other in the Dominican Republic where they competed for rewards and immunity to avoid being eliminated themselves.

After 70 days, the jury decided Blagoy Georgiev to win 150,000 leva and the title of Sole Survivor.

The season premiered on 18 February 2023 on bTV.

The season final was aired on 16 May 2023 on bTV with Blagoy Georgiev winning 150,000 leva and the title of Sole Survivor.

== Contestants ==
Contestant	Original Tribe	Intruders Enter	Switched Tribe	Merged Tribe	Main Game	Redemption Island	Finish
Zlatomira Oprova; 32, Vratsa	Warriors				1st Voted Out; Day 7		24th
Stefani Rоzsolkov; 22, Sofia	Famous				Left Compeititon; Day 7		23rd
Krum Tsonev; 27, Pleven	Warriors				2nd Voted Out; Day 14		22nd
Filip Bukov; 29, Sofia	Famous				Medically Evacuated; Day 18		21st
Margo Cooper; 29, Sofia	Famous	Famous			3rd Voted Out; Day 21		20th
Aleksandra Nakova; 32, Sofia		Warriors			4th Voted Out; Day 28		19th
Elina Panayotova; 26, Sofia	Warriors	Warriors	Reds		5th Voted Out		18th
Bozhana Katsarova; 33, Sofia	Famous	Famous	Blues		6th Voted Out	Lost Battle 1	17th
Stefan Popov - Chefo; Returned to game	Famous	Famous	Blues		7th Voted Out	1st Returnee	
Staniliya Stamenova; Returned to game		Famous	Reds		8th Voted Out	2nd Returnee	
Georgi Valentinov; 29, Stara Zagora	Famous	Famous	Reds	Yellows	Lost Challenge; 1st Jury Member	Lost Battle 2	16th
Staniliya Stamenova; 34, Sofia		Famous	Reds	Yellows	10th Voted Out; 2nd Jury Member	Lost Battle 3	15th
Snezhana Makaveeva; 32, Sofia	Famous	Famous	Blues	Yellows	11th Voted Out; 3rd Jury Member	Lost Battle 4	14th
Stefan Popov - Chefo; 29, Varna	Famous	Famous	Blues	Yellows	12th Voted Out; 4th Jury Member	Lost Battle 4	13th
Ivan Bulkin; 27, Plovdiv	Famous	Famous	Reds	Yellows	13th Voted Out; 5th Jury Member	Lost Battle 5	12th
Kiril Hadzhiev - Tino; 26, Varna		Warriors	Reds	Yellows	14th Voted Out; 6th Jury Member	Lost Battle 6	11th
Pavel Zdravkov; 25, Sofia	Warriors	Warriors	Blues	Yellows	16th Voted Out; 7th Jury Member	Lost Battle 7	10th
Maria Obreykova; 21, Karlovo	Warriors	Warriors	Reds	Yellows	15th Voted Out; 8th Jury Member	Lost Battle 8	9th
Genoveva Ivanova; 24, Pernik	Warriors	Warriors	Blues	Yellows	17th Voted Out; 9th Jury Member	Lost Battle 9	8th
Tsvetelin Stavrev; 21, Sofia	Warriors	Warriors	Blues	Yellows	18th Voted Out; 10th Jury Member	Lost Battle 9	7th
Blagoy Georgiev; Returned to game	Famous	Famous	Reds	Yellows	9th Voted Out	3rd Returnee	
Tatyana; 44, Saedinenie	Famous	Famous	Reds	Yellows	Lost Challenge; 11th Jury Member; Day 67		6th
Edis Pala; 27, Sofia	Warriors	Warriors	Blues	Yellows	Lost Challenge; 12th Jury Member; Day 68		5th
Svetoslav Slavchev; 49, Sofia	Warriors	Warriors	Reds	Yellows	Lost Challenge; 13th Jury Member; Day 69		4th
Danail Stoyanov; 22, Vratsa		Famous	Blues	Yellows	2nd Runner-up; Day 70		3rd
Ermina Boyanova; 21, Sofia	Warriors	Warriors	Blues	Yellows	Runner-up; Day 70		2nd
Blagoy Georgiev; 41, Sofia	Famous	Famous	Reds	Yellows	Sole Survivor; Day 70		1st

== Challenges ==
=== Tribal Phase ===
Episode	Air date	Challenges			Nominated	Vote	Voted out	Finish
Episode	Air date	Reward	Tribal immunity	Individual immunity	Nominated	Vote	Voted out	Finish
Episode 1	18 February 2023	Famous	Famous	Svetoslav	Elina	4-4-2	None	
Episode 1	18 February 2023	Famous	Famous	Svetoslav	Genoveva	4-4-2	None	
Episode 1	18 February 2023	Famous	Famous	Svetoslav	Maria	1-0	None	
Episode 2	19 February 2023	None	Famous	None	Zlatomira	6-2-1-1	None	
Episode 3	20 February 2023	Warriors	None	None	None	None	Zlatomira	1st Voted Out; Day 7
Episode 3	20 February 2023	Warriors	None	None	None	None	Stefani	Left Competition; Day 7
Episode 4	26 February 2023	None	Famous	Ermina	Elina	7-2	None	
Episode 4	26 February 2023	None	Famous	Ermina	Krum	1-0	None	
Episode 5	27 February 2023	None	Famous	None	Svetoslav	4-3-1-1	None	
Episode 6	28 February 2023	Warriors	None	None	None	None	Krum	2nd Voted Out; Day 14
Episode 7	4 March 2023	Famous	Warriors	Blagoy	Snezhana	4-2-2	None	
Episode 7	4 March 2023	Famous	Warriors	Blagoy	Margo	1-0	None	
Episode 8	6 March 2023	Warriors	Warriors	None	Bozhana	6-2	None	
Episode 9	7 March 2023	Famous	None	None	None	None	Filip	Medically Evacuated; Day 18
Episode 9	7 March 2023	Famous	None	None	None	None	Margo	3rd Voted Out; Day 21
Episode 10	11 March 2023	Famous	Famous	Svetoslav	Elina	6-3	None	
Episode 10	11 March 2023	Famous	Famous	Svetoslav	Maria	1-0	None	
Episode 11	13 March 2023	Warriors	Famous	None	Aleksandra	7-2-1	None	
Episode 12	14 March 2023	Warriors	None	None	None	None	Aleksandra	4th Voted Out; Day 28
Episode 12	14 March 2023	Famous	None	None	None	None	Aleksandra	4th Voted Out; Day 28
Episode 13	20 March 2023	Reds	Blues	Maria	Elina	7-2	None	
Episode 14	21 March 2023	Reds	Blues	None	Tino	5-4	Elina	Lost Challenge
Episode 15	27 March 2023	Blues	Reds	Chefo	Snezhana	5-4	None	
Episode 16	28 March 2023	Blues	Reds	None	Bozhana	5-3-1	Bozhana	Lost Challenge
Episode 17	3 April 2023	Reds	Blues	Staniliya	Tino	5-2-1	None	
Episode 18	4 April 2023	Reds	Reds	Snezhana	Chefo	5-2-1	Chefo	Lost Challenge
Episode 19	10 April 2023	Blues	Blues	Maria	Staniliya	4-2-1-1	None	
Episode 20	11 April 2023	None	Blues	None	Tino	6-2	Staniliya	Lost Challenge

=== Individual Phase ===
Episode	Air date	Challenges		Voted out	Vote	Finish	Redemption duel	
Episode	Air date	Reward	Immunity	Voted out	Vote	Finish	Winner	Eliminated
Episode 21	17 April 2023	None	Pavel	Georgi	None	Lost Challenge	Chefo (Note: Returned to the game upon winning the Redemption Island challenge.)	Bozhana
Episode 21	17 April 2023	None	Pavel	Blagoy	11-5	5th Voted Out	Staniliya	Bozhana
Episode 22	18 April 2023	Danail, Chefo, Staniliya, Ivan, Snezhana, Svetoslav, Genoveva	Pavel	Staniliya	5-4-1-0	6th Voted Out	Staniliya	Georgi
Episode 22	18 April 2023	Danail, Chefo, Staniliya, Ivan, Snezhana, Svetoslav, Genoveva	Pavel	Staniliya	5-4-1-0	6th Voted Out	Blagoy	Georgi
Episode 23	24 April 2023	Maria, Chefo, Pavel, Ivan, Snezhana, Svetoslav, Tsvetelin	Ivan	Snezhana	8-3-1	7th Voted Out	Blagoy	Staniliya
Episode 23	24 April 2023	Maria, Chefo, Pavel, Ivan, Snezhana, Svetoslav, Tsvetelin	Ivan	Snezhana	8-3-1	7th Voted Out	Snezhana	Staniliya
Episode 24	25 April 2023	Maria, Chefo, Pavel, Ivan, Snezhana, Svetoslav, Tsvetelin	Pavel	Chefo	5-1	8th Voted Out	Blagoy	Snezhana
Episode 24	25 April 2023	Maria, Chefo, Pavel, Ivan, Snezhana, Svetoslav, Tsvetelin	Tino	Ivan	5-1	9th Voted Out	Ivan	Chefo
Episode 25	1 May 2023	Edis, Danail, Tatyana, Ermina, Tsvetelin	Genoveva	Tino	7-3	10th Voted Out	Tino	Ivan
Episode 25	1 May 2023	Edis, Danail, Tatyana, Ermina, Tsvetelin	Genoveva	Tino	7-3	10th Voted Out	Blagoy	Ivan
Episode 26	2 May 2023	Danail	Danail	Maria	7-2	11th Voted Out	Blagoy	Tino
Episode 26	2 May 2023	Danail	Danail	Maria	7-2	11th Voted Out	Maria	Tino
Episode 27	8 May 2023	Tatyana	Tatyana	Pavel	4-3-1	12th Voted Out	Maria	Pavel
Episode 27	8 May 2023	Tatyana	Tatyana	Pavel	4-3-1	12th Voted Out	Blagoy	Pavel
Episode 28	9 May 2023	Tsvetelin	Ermina	Genoveva	3-1-0	13th Voted Out	Blagoy	Maria
Episode 28	9 May 2023	Tsvetelin	Ermina	Genoveva	3-1-0	13th Voted Out	Genoveva	Maria
Episode 29	15 May 2023	Danail	Danail	Tsvetelin	2-2-0	14th Voted Out	Blagoy	Genoveva
Episode 29	15 May 2023	Danail	Danail	Tsvetelin	2-2-0	14th Voted Out	Blagoy	Tsvetelin
Episode 30	16 May 2023	None	None	Tatyana	Challenge	Lost Challenge	None	
Episode 30	16 May 2023	None	None	Edis	Challenge	Lost Challenge	None	
Episode 30	16 May 2023	None	None	Svetoslav	Challenge	Lost Challenge	None	
Episode 30	16 May 2023	Jury Vote		Danail	8-3-2	2nd Runner-up	None	
Episode 30	16 May 2023	Jury Vote		Ermina	8-3-2	Runner-up	None	
Episode 30	16 May 2023	Jury Vote		Blagoy	8-3-2	Sole Survivor	None	

== Voting History ==
=== Tribal Phase ===
Immune	Nominated

	Original tribes								Switched tribes							
Week	Week 1		Week 2		Week 3		Week 4		Week 5		Week 6		Week 7		Week 8	
Episode	1	2	4	5	7	8	10	11	13	14	15	16	17	18	19	20
Nominated by Group	Elina; Genoveva	Zlatomira	Elina	Svetoslav	Snezhana	Bozhana	Elina	Aleksandra	Elina	Tino	Snezhana	Bozhana	Tino	Chefo	Staniliya	Tino
Votes	4-4-2	6-2-1-1	7-2	4-3-1-1	4-2-2	6-2	7-3	7-2-1	7-2	5-4	5-4 (Note: Danail used a Hidden Immunity Idol, however, no votes were cast against him.)	5-3-1	5-2-1	5-2-1	4-2-1-1	6-2
Nominated by Immune	Maria		Krum		Margo		Maria									
Nominated for Elimination	Elina; Genoveva; Maria; Zlatomira		Elina; Krum; Svetoslav		Bozhana; Margo; Snezhana		Aleksandra; Elina; Maria		Elina; Tino		Bozhana; Snezhana		Tino; Chefo		Tino; Staniliya	
Eliminated	Zlatomira; Fewest votes by public to save		Krum; 19% by public to save		Filip; Medically evacuated		Aleksandra; 7,2% by public to save		Elina; Lost challenge		Bozhana; Lost challenge		Chefo; Lost challenge		Staniliya; Lost challenge	
Eliminated	Stefani; Walked		Krum; 19% by public to save		Margo; 10,2% by public to save		Aleksandra; 7,2% by public to save		Elina; Lost challenge		Bozhana; Lost challenge		Chefo; Lost challenge		Staniliya; Lost challenge	
Blagoy					Snezhana; Margo	Bozhana			Elina	Tino			Tino		Staniliya	Tino
Ermina	Unknown	Zlatomira	Elina; Krum	Svetoslav			Elina	Aleksandra			Snezhana	Bozhana		Chefo		
Danail	Not in the Game										Genoveva	Genoveva		Pavel		
Svetoslav	Zlatomira; Maria	Pavel	Elina	Edis			Elina; Maria	Aleksandra	Elina	Tino			Tino		Staniliya	Tino
Edis	Unknown	Zlatomira	Elina	Genoveva			Elina	Aleksandra			Snezhana	Bozhana		Chefo		
Tatyana					Snezhana	Bozhana			Elina	Tino			Tino		Staniliya	Tino
Tsvetelin	Genoveva	Zlatomira	Elina	Svetoslav			Elina	Aleksandra			Snezhana	Bozhana		Chefo		
Genoveva	Elina	Edis	Krum	Edis			Maria	Tino			Snezhana	Bozhana		Chefo		
Maria	Elina	Zlatomira	Elina	Svetoslav			Elina	Aleksandra	Svetoslav	Tatyana			Svetoslav		Tino	Tino
Pavel	Elina	Zlatomira	Elina	Svetoslav			Elina	Aleksandra			Snezhana	Bozhana		Chefo		
Tino	Not in the Game						Elina	Aleksandra	Elina	Tatyana			Svetoslav		Blagoy	Tatyana
Ivan					Snezhana	Bozhana			Elina	Tino			Tino		Tino	Tino
Chefo					Margo	Bozhana					Genoveva	Genoveva		Edis	Redemption Island	
Snezhana					Margo	Bozhana					Genoveva	Genoveva		Edis		
Staniliya	Not in the Game								Elina	Tatyana			Blagoy		Tatyana	Tatyana
Georgi					Snezhana	Bozhana			Elina	Tino			Tino		Staniliya	Tino
Bozhana					Tatyana	Tatyana					Genoveva	Tsvetelin	Redemption Island			
Elina	Genoveva	Pavel	Krum	Edis			Maria	Edis	Svetoslav	Tatyana						
Aleksandra	Not in the Game						Maria	Edis								
Margo					Tatyana	Tatyana										
Filip					Hospitalized											
Krum	Zlatomira	Zlatomira	Elina	Maria												
Stefani																
Zlatomira	Unknown	Krum														

=== Individual Phase ===
	Merged Tribe																	
Week	Week 9			Week 10			Week 11		Week 12		Week 13							
Episode	21		22	23	24		25	26	27	28	29		30					
Eliminated	Georgi	Blagoy	Staniliya	Snezhana	Chefo	Ivan	Tino	Maria	Pavel	Genoveva	Tie	Tsvetelin	Tatyana	Edis	Svetoslav	Danail	Ermina	Blagoy
Votes	Challenge	11-5	5-3-1-0 (Note: Staniliya used a Hidden Immunity Idol to save Snezhana, therefore, five votes against her were not counted.)	10-2-1	5-1	5-1	7-3	7-2	5-2-1	3-1-0 (Note: Ermina used a Hidden Immunity Idol to save Tsvetelin, therefore, four votes against him were not counted.)	2-2-0 (Note: Ermina used a Hidden Immunity Idol to save herself, therefore, two votes against her were not counted.)	1-0 (Note: As the holder of the Immunity Necklace, Danail had to choose which of the tied contestants to go to the Redemption Island.)	Challenge	Challenge	Challenge	8-3-2		
Blagoy		Edis	Redemption Island													Jury Vote		
Ermina		Blagoy	Staniliya	Snezhana	Chefo		Tino	Svetoslav	Pavel; Pavel (Note: Pavel was not eligible to vote, as Ermina used her advantage to vote twice and block someone from voting.)	Genoveva	Svetoslav					Jury Vote		
Danail		Blagoy	~~Snezhana~~	Snezhana	Chefo		Tino	Maria	Pavel	~~Tsvetelin~~; ~~Tsvetelin~~ (Note: Danail used his Extra Vote advantage.)	Tsvetelin	Tsvetelin				Jury Vote		
Svetoslav		Edis	~~Snezhana~~	Snezhana	Chefo		Tino	Maria	Pavel	Genoveva	Tsvetelin							Blagoy
Edis		Blagoy	Staniliya	Snezhana		Ivan	Tino	Maria	Svetoslav	~~Tsvetelin~~	~~Ermina~~							Blagoy
Tatyana		Edis	~~Snezhana~~	Snezhana		Ivan	Tino	Maria	Svetoslav	Danail	~~Ermina~~							Blagoy
Tsvetelin		Blagoy	Staniliya	Snezhana		Ivan	Tatyana	Maria	Pavel	Genoveva	Svetoslav						Ermina	
Genoveva		Blagoy	Staniliya	Snezhana		Ivan	Tino	Maria	Danail	~~Tsvetelin~~	Redemption Island						Ermina	
Maria		Blagoy	~~Snezhana~~	Snezhana	Chefo		Tino	Svetoslav	Redemption Island									Blagoy
Pavel		Blagoy	Staniliya	Snezhana	Chefo		Tatyana	Maria	None								Ermina	
Tino		Blagoy	Ivan	Tatyana		Ivan	Tatyana	Redemption Island								Danail		
Ivan		Edis	~~Snezhana~~	Snezhana		Tatyana	Redemption Island											Blagoy
Chefo		Blagoy; Edis (Note: Chefo used his Extra Vote advantage.)	Tsvetelin	Pavel	Ermina													Blagoy
Snezhana		Blagoy	Tsvetelin	Tatyana	Redemption Island													Blagoy
Staniliya		Blagoy	Tsvetelin	Redemption Island												Danail		
Georgi		Redemption Island																Blagoy
Bozhana																		
Elina																		
Aleksandra																		
Margo																		
Filip																		
Krum																		
Stefani																		
Zlatomira																		
