= Survivor BG =

- Genre: Reality competition
- Based on: Expedition Robinson
- Presented by: Kamen Vodenicharov (2006); Vladimir Karamazov (2007–2022); Evtim Mioshev (2009 to day 20 of season 4); Vanja Džaferović (2023)
- Country of origin: Bulgaria
- Original language: Bulgarian
- No. of seasons: 7

Original release
- Network: bTV
- Release: September 20, 2006 – May 16, 2023

Related
- International versions of Survivor

Survivor BG is the Bulgarian version of the reality show Survivor, broadcast and produced by bTV.

== Seasons overview ==
List of Survivor BG seasons
Season	Name	Channel	Host	Days	Premiere	Final	Winner	Prize
1	Survivor BG	bTV	Kamen Vodenicharov	57	20 September 2006	11 December 2006	Neli Ivanova	250 000 leva
2	Survivor: Expedition Robinson	bTV	Vladimir Karamazov	52	19 September 2007	6 December 2007	Georgi Kostadinov	250 000 leva
3	Survivor: Pearl Islands	bTV	Vladimir Karamazov	52	24 September 2008	21 December 2008	Nikolay Martinov	250 000 leva
4	Survivor: Philippines	bTV	Evtim Miloshev (until Day 20); Vladimir Karamazov	52	22 September 2009	21 December 2009	Georgi Kehayov	250 000 leva
5	Survivor: Cambodia	bTV	Vladimir Karamazov	52	15 September 2014	15 December 2014	Vanja Džaferović	100 000 leva
6	Survivor: The Hidden Idol	bTV	Vladimir Karamazov	43	21 February 2022	27 April 2022	Zoran Petrovski	150 000 leva
7	Survivor 7	bTV	Vanja Džaferović	70	18 February 2023	16 May 2023	Blagoy Georgiev	150 000 leva

== Season 1 (2006) ==
Survivor BG's first season logo. The tagline means "Only one person will survive in the end."

The show's first season was filmed on a deserted island in the Caribbean off the coast of the Dominican Republic in the summer of 2006 by an international Bulgarian-Argentine team. It was hosted by the famous actor Kamen Vodenicharov. It started on 20 September 2006 and ended on 11 December 2006. 16 Bulgarians took part in the first season. The prize was 250,000 leva. The first winner in Survivor BG was Neli Ivanova.

=== Participants ===
- Olya Gospodinova (51)
- Margarita Yankova (21)
- Diyana Agontseva (35)
- Aleksandar Dimitrov (28)
- Iliana Valcheva (27)
- Kostadin Traykov (33)
- Andrey Manev (27)
- Zvezdomir Shutov (24)
- Ivan Sirakov (48)
- Tanya Vasileva (22)
- Semra Niyazieva (26)
- Petya Spasova (27)
- Valentin Hristov (53)
- Atanas Ganev (32)
- Ahmed Shuganov (26)
- Neli Ivanova (29)

== Season 2 (2007) ==
Season 2 was aired on bTV from 24 September 2007 with a special live event airing on 19 September in which 22 contestants took part. This season had a brand new host, Vladimir Karamazov.

=== Participants ===
- Aleksandar Kirov (33)
- Anton Agontsev (35)
- Bilyana Martinova (18)
- Diana Parvanova (21)
- Dilyan Bachvarov "Bach" (22)
- Djina Stoeva (30)
- Gabriela Martinova (18)
- Galina Ivanova (29)
- Georgi Drenski (31)
- Georgi Kostadinov (27)
- Georgi Krastev (23)
- Hristina Dimitrova (22)
- Ivan Kristof (38)
- Lachezar Borisov (44)
- Megi Derm (33)
- Miroslav Djokanov (19)
- Petar Nedyalkov (54)
- Sasha Voskresenska (46)
- Stanislav Iliev "Findo" (26)
- Stanka Nikleva (28)
- Svetla Dimitrova (37)
- Tsvetelina Razlozhka (29)

== Season 3 (2008) ==
The premiere of season 3 was on 24 September 2008 on bTV. The actor Vladimir Karamazov continued as host.

=== Participants ===
- Ali Aliev (28)
- Dimitar Dimitrov (29)
- Evgeniya Angelova (18)
- Filip Lhamsuren (28)
- Galina Petkova (34)
- Georgi Vanov (45)
- Gergana Dimitrova (23)
- Gergana Savova (31)
- Ivan Dimitrov (38)
- Ivanka Kostova (46)
- Lachezar Angelov (40)
- Marina Antonova (19)
- Nikolay Martinov (40)
- Silviya Dimitrova (27)
- Silviya Radulova (29)
- Spas Stoyanov (24)
- Valentin Gavazov (52)
- Vanya Boneva (23)
- Yana Marinova (29)
- Yanita Yancheva (21)
- Zdravko Zdravkov (37)
- Zhivko Naydenov (27)

== Season 4 (2009) ==
Season 4 was filmed during May, June and July 2009 in the Philippines. The premiere of season 4 was on 22 September 2009 on bTV. The hosts consisted of Evtim Mioshev until the 22nd day, which then after switched to Vladimir Karamazov.

For the first time in the Survivor franchise across the world as a whole, a contestant died — Noncho Vodenicharov died of a heart attack during filming.

=== Participants ===
- Dimitar Hodzhev "Mityo Krika" (33)
- Emanuela Badeva (22)
- Georgi Kehayov (19)
- Georgi Petkov (29)
- Hristina Ruseva (29)
- Indira Kasimova (22)
- Iva Prandzheva (37)
- Ivan Jochkolovski (24)
- Julieta Okot (40)
- Kiril Haralampiev (29)
- Lyuben Ivanov (26)
- Lyudmila Dimitrova (31)
- Lyudmila Ivanova (42)
- Margarita Amidzhirova (22)
- Maria Kalenderska (24)
- Nikolay Koychev (36)
- Noncho Vodenicharov† (53)
- Plamen Penev (23)
- Ralitsa Ginkova (25)
- Ralitsa Kirilova (28)
- Svetlin Zanev (35)
- Svetoslav Barkanichkov (35)
- Verislav Tudjarov (21)
- Zlatina Dimitrova (22)

== Season 5 (2014) ==
Cast for the new season, entitled "Survivor Cambodia: Fans vs Favorites", was to November 15, 2013. The premiere of season 5 was on 15 September 2014.

=== Participants ===
- Anton Agontsev (41)
- Damyana Mateva (22)
- Desislava Stefanova (28)
- Dimitar Dimitrov (35)
- Diyana Agontseva (43)
- Emanuil Naydenov (36)
- Iva Prandzheva (41)
- Krum Sirakov (27)
- Marcho Markov (28)
- Merlina Arnaudova (42)
- Nadezhda Prokopieva (25)
- Ralitsa Kirilova (32)
- Rosen Vangelov (36)
- Silviya Dimitrova (33)
- Silviya Radulova (35)
- Stanislav Iliev "Findo" (33)
- Svetlin Zanev (40)
- Svetoslav Barkanichkov (40)
- Vanja Džaferović (30)
- Vasil Petkov (52)
- Yanita Yancheva (26)
- Yavor Zayn (27)
- Yordanka Nikolova "Yori" (29)

== Season 6 (2022) ==
After a 7-year hiatus on April 15, 2021, it was announced that Survivor would return with a new season in 2022. The premiere of season 6 was on 21 February 2022

=== Participants ===
- Aleksandra Petrova (35)
- Anelia Shtereva (21)
- Borislava Varbanova (29)
- Ganka Stateva (25)
- Georgi Petkov (24)
- Djuliana Butrakova (22)
- Dragomir Methodiev (46)
- Zoran Petrovski (39)
- Ivaylo Krusharski (28)
- Ivana Mikova (43)
- Ivan Georgiev (32)
- Ilian Vassilev (37)
- Ioana Varbichkova (34)
- Karin Okolie (27)
- Margaritha Chaneva (36)
- Mila Savova (31)
- Milev Kutelov (33)
- Peyo Georgiev (43)

== Season 7 (2023) ==
=== Participants ===
1. Blagoy Georgiev (41)
2. Ermina Boyanova (21)
3. Danail Stoyanov (22)
4. Edis Pala (27)
5. Svetoslav Slavchev (49)
6. Tatyana (44)
7. Tsvetelin Stavrev (21)
8. Genoveva Ivanova (24)
9. Maria Obreykova (21)
10. Pavel Zdravkov (25)
11. Kiril Hadzhiev - Tino (26)
12. Ivan Bulkin (27)
13. Stefan Popov - Chefo (29)
14. Snezhana Makaveeva (32)
15. Staniliya Stamenova (34)
16. Georgi Valentinov (29)
17. Bozhana Katsarova (33)
18. Elina Panayotova (26)
19. Aleksandra Nakova (32)
20. Margo Cooper (29)
21. Krum Tsonev (27)
22. Filip Bukov (29)
23. Zlatomira Oprova (32)
24. Stefani Razsolkov (22)
