= Nedyalkov =

Nedyalkov (Cyrillic: Недялков) is a Slavic masculine surname, its feminine counterpart is Nedyalkova. It may refer to

- Anton Nedyalkov (born 1993), Bulgarian footballer
- Georgi Nedyalkov (born 1989), Bulgarian footballer
- Anjela Nedyalkova, (born 1991), Bulgarian actress
