= Bulgarian Rhapsody =

2014 film

- Theatrical release poster
- Directed by: Ivan Nitchev
- Written by: Yurii Dachev; Tatyana Granitova; Jean Pierre Magro; Ivan Nitchev
- Produced by: Leon Edery; Moshe Edery; Nissim Levy; Shaul Scherze
- Starring: Stefan Popov; Kristiyan Makarov; Anjela Nedyalkova
- Cinematography: Addie Reiss
- Edited by: Tatyana Bogdanova; Isaac Sehayek
- Music by: Stephan Dimitrov
- Distributed by: Cinepaz EOOD; Cinisima
- Release date: March 2014
- Running time: 108 minutes
- Countries: Bulgaria; Israel
- Language: Bulgarian
- Budget: 1.8 million leva

Bulgarian Rhapsody (Bulgarian: Пътят към Коста дел Маресме) is a 2014 drama film directed by Ivan Nitchev. It was selected as the Bulgarian entry for the Best Foreign Language Film at the 87th Academy Awards, but was not nominated. There was some controversy in the selection due to Nitchev's involvement with the Bulgarian National Film Council.

The film is part of a historic trilogy about Bulgarian Jewry, which also includes the films After the End of the World (1999) and Journey to Jerusalem (2003).

== Plot ==
The film is a drama set in 1943 Bulgaria against the backdrop of the persecution of Bulgarian Jews and the deportation of Jews from Thrace, Macedonia, and Pirot to extermination camps. It tells the story of two boys—one Jewish and the other a Bulgarian Christian—who both fall in love with a Jewish girl from the city of Kavala, which was nominally annexed by Bulgaria, but remained under German control in the years 1941-44.

== Cast ==
- Stefan Popov as Giogio
- Kristiyan Makarov as Moni
- Anjela Nedyalkova as Shelli
- Moni Moshonov as Moiz
- Stoyan Aleksiev as Abraham
- Alex Ansky as Albert
- Tatyana Lolova as Fortune
- Dimitar Ratchkov as Ivan Georgiev

== Production ==
The film was produced by Nissim Levy, Moshe Edery, Leon Edery, and Shaul Scherzer, with financial support from the Yehoshua Rabinovich Foundation for the Arts in Tel Aviv and Reshet. The cast included Moni Moshonov and Alex Ansky.

== See also ==
- List of submissions to the 87th Academy Awards for Best Foreign Language Film
- List of Bulgarian submissions for the Academy Award for Best Foreign Language Film
