= Ivan and Alexandra =

1989 film

- Directed by: Ivan Nitchev
- Written by: Ivan Nitchev
- Produced by: Vladimir Bobchev
- Starring: Kliment Corbadziev
- Cinematography: Georgi Nikolov
- Edited by: Ani Cherneva
- Release date: 27 February 1989
- Running time: 80 minutes
- Country: Bulgaria
- Language: Bulgarian

Ivan and Alexandra (Bulgarian: 1952: Иван и Александра, translit. 1952: Ivan i Aleksandra) is a 1989 Bulgarian drama film directed by Ivan Nitchev. It was entered into the 39th Berlin International Film Festival.

== Cast ==
- Kliment Corbadziev as Ivan
- Simeon Savov as Moni
- Monika Budjonova as Aleksandra
- Bashar Rahal as Cvetan
- Tomina Lazova as Svetla
- Boris Chuchkov as Krasimir
- Ivan Trichkov as Ogi
- Maria Statoulova as Maykata na Aleksandra
- Andrei Andreyev as Bashtata na Aleksandra
- Maria Naydenova as Maykata ha Ivan
- Hristo Garbov as Bashtata na Ivan
- Mariana Krumova as Druzhinnata
- Silvia Vargova as Maykata na Krasimir
- Minka Syulemezova as Klasnata
- Svetla Angelova as Mariya
- Filip Trifonov as Ochilatiyat
