= The Paradise Suite (film) =

2015 film

- Film poster
- Directed by: Joost van Ginkel
- Written by: Joost van Ginkel
- Starring: Isaka Sawadogo
- Release dates: 13 September 2015 (TIFF); 29 October 2015 (Netherlands)
- Running time: 118 minutes
- Country: Netherlands
- Languages: English; French; Bosnian; Swedish; Bulgarian; Serbian; Dutch

The Paradise Suite is a 2015 Dutch drama film written and directed by Joost van Ginkel. It was selected as the Dutch entry for the Best Foreign Language Film at the 88th Academy Awards, but it was not nominated. It was screened in the Discovery section of the 2015 Toronto International Film Festival. It also won three Golden Calves for Best Film, Best Actor (Sawadogo), and Best Screenplay.

== Plot ==
The film follows a number of foreigners who find themselves in Amsterdam: a man from Burkina Faso named Yaya who loses his job and gets in financial trouble, three girls from Bulgaria who are told they will be models for a photoshoot but end up in prostitution, a musical conductor from Sweden named Stig whose son Lukas goes missing, a war criminal from Serbia named Ivica who now runs a brothel in the red light district, and a woman from Bosnia named Seka who recognises Ivica from her past. The foreigners all cross paths in different ways and find themselves having to rely on their new friendships.

== Cast ==
- Isaka Sawadogo as Yaya
- Anjela Nedyalkova as Jenya
- Magnus Krepper as Stig
- Jasna Đuričić as Seka
- Erik Adelöw as Lukas
- Dragan Bakema as Milijan
- Raymond Thiry as Maarten
- Sigrid ten Napel as Antoinette
- Eva Röse as Julia Lindh Åberg
- Victoria Koblenko as Ana
- Jeroen Spitzenberger as Sven
- Reinout Bussemaker as Jack
- Babetida Sadjo as Angele
- Emmanuel Ohene Boafo as Mohammed

== See also ==
- List of submissions to the 88th Academy Awards for Best Foreign Language Film
- List of Dutch submissions for the Academy Award for Best Foreign Language Film
