= Svetoslav Barkanichkov =

Bulgarian footballer

Personal information
- Full name: Svetoslav Dimov Barkanichkov
- Date of birth: 1 March 1974 (age 52)
- Place of birth: Pleven, Bulgaria
- Height: 1.83 m (6 ft 0 in)
- Position: Midfielder

Team information
- Current team: Spartak Pleven (youth coach)

Senior career*
Years	Team	Apps	(Gls)
1991–1995	Spartak Pleven	80	(19)
1995–1996	Storgozia Pleven	21	(6)
1996	Cherno More	11	(3)
1997	Neftochimic	7	(1)
1997–1998	Shumen	20	(3)
1998–1999	Vidima-Rakovski	26	(11)
1999–2000	Svetkavitsa	41	(11)
2001	Levski Sofia	10	(0)
2001–2002	Spartak Pleven	12	(2)
2002–2004	Loko Plovdiv	14	(2)
2004–2005	Korona Kielce	12	(0)
2005	ŁKS Łódź	12	(1)
2006	Radomiak Radom	10	(1)
2006–2007	Mazovia Rawa Mazowiecka		
2008	GLKS Nadarzyn		
2008	Belite Orli	5	(0)
2009	Botev Krivodol		
2009–2010	Gigant Belene		
2011–2013	Storgozia Pleven		
2013–2014	Juventus Malchika		
2014–2015	Levski 2007 (Levski)	6	(3)
2016	Akademik Svishtov		
2017–2018	Partizan Cherven Bryag		
2019–2020	Lato Alekovo		

Managerial career
- 2015–2016: Belite Orli
- 2020–: Spartak Pleven (youth)
- * Club domestic league appearances and goals

Svetoslav Barkanichkov (Bulgarian: Светослав Бърканичков; born 1 March 1974) is a Bulgarian football coach and former player.

== Club career ==
Born in Pleven, Barkanichkov was a squad member of numerous clubs in the top division of Bulgarian football, most notably becoming champion of Bulgaria twice - in 2001 with Levski Sofia and in 2004 with Loko Plovdiv. In the mid to late 2000s, he also donned the shirt of teams from Poland.

== International career ==
In 2001, after having impressed Uzbek scouts during an Albena Cup match between Levski Sofia and Uzbekistan, Barkanichkov received a lucrative financial offer to represent the Central Asian country's national team, but refused it, as he was at the time on then manager of Bulgaria Stoycho Mladenov's radar. Eventually he never got to play international football, as he was plagued by injury problems during the year 2001.

== Personal ==
Following retirement, Barkanichkov was employed as a fitness instructor in Pleven in addition to continuing to play football at the amateur level in Bulgaria. In 2009 and 2014, he was a participant in the 4th and 5th seasons of Survivor, receiving praise for his performance. Barkanichkov is married and has a son. He is a fan of Premier League team Southampton, with Matthew Le Tissier being one of his football idols. Barkanichkov is a huge enthusiast regarding vampires.

== Honours ==
Levski Sofia

- First Professional Football League: 2000–01

Loko Plovdiv

- First Professional Football League: 2003–04

Korona Kielce

- II liga: 2004–05
