= FC Belite Orli Pleven =

Bulgarian football club

Belite Orli Pleven
- Full name: PFC Belite Orli
- Founded: 1931; 94 years ago 2014; 11 years ago (refounded)
- Ground: Belite Orli Stadium, Pleven
- Capacity: 15,000
- Chairman: Zdravko Georgiev
- League: A RFG Pleven
- 2014–15: B RFG Pleven, 1st /promoted/
Home colours	Away colours

Belite Orli Pleven (Bulgarian: ПФК Белите орли Плевен) is a Bulgarian football club from the town of Pleven, currently playing in the A RFG Pleven, the fourth division of Bulgarian football. The team was dissolved in 2010, but was restored in 2014.

== History ==
=== Foundation ===
On 19 August 1931 in Pleven is founded the football club Belite Orleta. The team name is changed to Belite Orli in 1932. In 1942 they are allowed to build own stadium called Spartak, but later the name is changed to Belite Orli Stadium. In 1947 team is merged with the other Pleven football clubs to found one united team called PFC Spartak Pleven.

=== 1991–2010 ===
On 20 January 1991 the team is refounded by Viktor Haidukov, son of one of the original founders and others. Team is led by association Sport Club Belite Orli. The team had 8 seasons in the Bulgarian 2nd league B Group, before it was dissolved in 2010 due to financial problems.

=== 2014–present ===
The team is ones again refounded in 2014 and started from the fifth league of Bulgaria the B Regional Group. The team promoted to A Regional Group in the first season. For the 2014–15 season Svetoslav Barkanichkov was appointed as manager hoping to manage the team to the V Group.

== Honours ==
- B RFG Pleven:
  - Winners (1): 2014–15

== Players ==
As of 12 November 2015

Note: Flags indicate national team as defined under FIFA eligibility rules; some limited exceptions apply. Players may hold more than one non-FIFA nationality.

No.	Pos.	Nation	Player
1	GK	(Bulgaria) BUL	Martin Lyubomirov
8	MF	(Bulgaria) BUL	Toni Pankov
10	MF	(Bulgaria) BUL	Ivan Brezov
11	FW	(Bulgaria) BUL	Plamen Simeonov

No.	Pos.	Nation	Player
13	DF	(Bulgaria) BUL	Simeon Rumenov
14	MF	(Bulgaria) BUL	Galin Pankov
21	GK	(Bulgaria) BUL	Pavel Vasilev

== Managers ==
Dates	Name	Honours
2015–2016	(Bulgaria) Svetoslav Barkanichkov	

== Past seasons ==
Season	League	Place	W	D	L	GF	GA	Pts	Bulgarian Cup
2014–15	B RFG Pleven (V)	1	17	2	1	73	14	53	not qualified
2015–16	A RFG Pleven (IV)	–	–	–	–	–	–	–	not qualified
Green marks a season followed by promotion, red a season followed by relegation.
