= Survivor BG: Expedition Robinson =

- No. of days: 52
- No. of castaways: 22
- Winner: Georgi Kostadinov
- Runner-up: Svetla Dimitrova
- Location: Dominican Republic
- No. of episodes: 52

Release
- Original network: bTV
- Original release: 19 September – 6 December 2007

Additional information
- Filming dates: May, 2007 – July, 2007

Season chronology
- ← Previous; Survivor BG Season 1 Next → Survivor BG: Panama

Survivor BG: Expedition Robinson was the second season of the Bulgarian reality television series of Survivor BG.

The season had 22 contestants competed in tribes facing off against each other in the Dominican Republic where they competed for rewards and immunity to avoid being eliminated themselves. After 52 days, the jury decided Georgi Kostadinov to win 250,000 leva and the title of Sole Survivor.

The show officially started on 24 September 2007. However, on 19 September there was a special live show in which the 22 contestants took part. In this season, there were some celebrity contestants, such as Djina Stoeva and Svetla Dimitrova.

The series had a new host, the actor Vladimir Karamazov. The season premiered on 19 September 2007 on bTV. The season final was aired on 6 December 2007 on bTV with Georgi Kostadinov winning 250,000 leva and the title of Sole Survivor.

== Contestants ==
Contestant	Original tribes	Merged tribe	Main Game	Redemption Island	Finish
Petar Nedyalkov; 54, Varna	None		Eliminated; Day 1		22nd
Galina Ivanova; 29, Dimitrovgrad	None		Eliminated; Day 1		21st
Tsvetelina Razlozhka; 29, Samokov	Barbados		1st Voted Out		20th
Sasha Voskresenska; 46, Kyustendil	Barbados		2nd Voted Out		19th
Hristina Dimitrova; 22, Blagoevgrad	Barbados		3rd Voted Out		18th
Gabriela Martinova; 18, Kardzhali	Tortuga		4th Voted Out		17th
Ivan Kristof; 38, Sofia	Tortuga		5th Voted Out		16th
Megi Derm; 33, Yambol	Barbados		6th Voted Out		15th
Bilyana Martinova; 18, Kardzhali	Barbados		7th Voted Out		14th
Diana Parvanova; 21, Ovoshnik	Tortuga		8th Voted Out		13th
Anton Agontsev; 35, Dupnitsa	Barbados	Drake	Lost Challenge	Quit	12th
Georgi Krastev; 23, Varna	Barbados	Drake	10th Voted Out; 1st Jury Member	Lost Duel 1	11th
Stanka Nikleva; 28, Ruse	Tortuga/Barbados	Drake	11th Voted Out; 2nd Jury Member	Lost Duel 2	10th
Aleksandar Kirov; 33, Sofia	Barbados	Drake	12th Voted Out; 3rd Jury Member	Lost Duel 3	9th
Miroslav Djokanov; 19, Vidin	Tortuga	Drake	13th Voted Out; 4th Jury Member	Lost Duel 4	8th
Djina Stoeva; 30, Ruse	Tortuga	Drake	14th Voted Out; 5th Jury Member	Lost Duel 5	7th
Stanislav Iliev "Findo"; 26, Sofia	Barbados	Drake	15th Voted Out; 6th Jury Member	Quit	6th
Lachezar Borisov; 44, Yambol	Tortuga	Drake	16th Voted Out; 7th Jury Member	Lost Duel 6	5th
Georgi Drenski; Returned to game	Barbados	Drake	9th Voted Out	1st Returnee	
Dilyan Bachvarov "Bach"; 22, Gabrovo	Tortuga	Drake	Lost Challenge; 8th Jury Member		4th
Georgi Drenski; 31, Sofia	Barbados	Drake	Lost Challenge; 9th Jury Member		3rd
Svetla Dimitrova; 37, Botevgrad	Tortuga	Drake	Runner-up		2nd
Georgi Kostadinov; 27, Petrich	Tortuga	Drake	Sole Survivor		1st
