= Traitors: Igra na predateli =

- Also known as: Traitors: Игра на предатели
- Genre: Reality; Game show
- Based on: De Verraders by: Marc Pos; Jasper Hoogendoorn
- Directed by: Tsvetomir Matev (1)
- Presented by: Vladimir Karamazov; Desislava Stoyanova (studio) (1)
- Country of origin: Bulgaria
- Original language: Bulgarian
- No. of seasons: 2
- No. of episodes: 24

Production
- Running time: ~90 minutes
- Production company: bTV Media Group

Original release
- Network: bTV, Voyo
- Release: September 16, 2025 – present

Traitors: Igra na predateli (Bulgarian: Traitors: Игра на предатели; also known as Game of Traitors) is the Bulgarian adaptation of the popular reality show The Traitors. The host is Vladimir Karamazov.

== Production ==
On June 23, 2025, bTV announced that the new reality format Traitors: Igra na predateli would premiere in the fall. The show features 25 popular personalities, and filming began in July in the Vidin area, at the Bononia Estate complex. The series premiered on September 16, 2025, at 8:00 p.m. on bTV and airs every Tuesday.

On September 18, 2026, bTV announces the second season's premiere date as October 30, 2026, and its new filming location. Filming takes place at Euxinograd, where various spaces of the palace and its grounds are used. The television premiere is subsequently postponed to November 6, 2026, at 8:00 p.m. on bTV, with episodes airing every Friday and Saturday. The season premieres on Voyo on November 5, 2026, with episodes available one day ahead of their television broadcast.

== Series overview ==
Series overview
Season	Contestants	Episodes	Originally released		Winner(s)	Runner(s)-up	Prize	Traitors
Season	Contestants	Episodes	First released	Last released	Winner(s)	Runner(s)-up	Prize	Traitors
1	25	12	September 16, 2025	November 25, 2025	Daniel Petkanov, Eva Veselinova, Georgi Kodzhabashev & Gloria Petkova (Faithfuls)	Daniel Bachorski (Traitor)	108,900 lv. / 150,000 lv.	Georgi Yanev Daniel Bachorski Nevena Bozukova – Neve Maya Paunovska (from ep. 7)
2	25	12	November 6, 2026	December 12, 2026	TBA	TBA	€37,000* / €75,000	Chris Makarov Milen Keremedchiev Nancy Karaboycheva Emil Markov

== Season 1 ==
=== Contestants ===
List of Traitors: Igra na predateli contestants
Contestant	Age	From	Occupation	Affiliation	Finish
Dilyana Popova	43	Sofia	Actress & model	None (Note: Dilyana was eliminated before roles were assigned.)	Eliminated (Episode 1)
Ivan Yurukov	47	Sandanski	Actor	Faithful	Murdered (Episode 2)
Mira Radeva	67	Svilengrad	Sociologist	Faithful	Banished (Episode 2)
Silvia Petkova	38	Sofia	Actress	Faithful	Murdered (Episode 3)
Toma Zdravkov	38	Pazardzhik	Musician	Faithful	Banished (Episode 3)
Borislav Lazarov	49	Plovdiv	TV host	Faithful	Murdered (Episode 4)
Georgi Yanev	24	Sofia	Reality star	Traitor	Banished (Episode 4)
Iskra Ontsova	56	Sofia	Lawyer & judge	Faithful	Murdered (Episode 5)
Stanimir Gamov	50	Stara Zagora	Actor	Faithful	Banished (Episode 5)
Nevena Bozukova – Neve	52	Varna	Actress	Traitor	Banished (Episode 6)
Anton Stefanov	54	Sofia	Journalist	Faithful	Murdered (Episode 7)
Kiril Hadzhiev – Tino	29	Varna	Musician	Faithful	Banished (Episode 7)
Dayana Yordanova	28	Vidin	Influencer	Faithful	Murdered (Episode 8)
Yordan Belev	45	Gabrovo	Magician	Faithful	Banished (Episode 8)
Olya Malinova	44	Varna	TV host	Faithful	Murdered (Episode 9)
Anna-Maria Grachenova	27	Bansko	Reality star	Faithful	Banished (Episode 9)
Mirela Ilieva	24	Varna	Influencer	Faithful	Murdered (Episode 10)
Maya Paunovska	37	Sofia	Reality star	Traitor	Banished (Episode 10)
Vladimir Nikolov	47	Sofia	Volleyball player	Faithful	Murdered (Episode 11)
Venci Venc’	37	Pleven	Musician	Faithful	Murdered (Episode 11)
Daniel Bachorski	37	Sofia	Businessman	Traitor	Banished (Episode 12)
Daniel Petkanov	39	Sofia	Influencer	Faithful	Winner (Episode 12)
Eva Veselinova	40	Sofia	Journalist	Faithful	Winner (Episode 12)
Georgi Kodzhabashev	35	Sofia	Reality star	Faithful	Winner (Episode 12)
Gloria Petkova	33	Sofia	Model & DJ	Faithful	Winner (Episode 12)

=== Elimination history ===
Key

The contestant was a Faithful.
The contestant was a Traitor.
The contestant was murdered by the Traitors.
The contestant was banished at the Round Table.
The contestant was ineligible to vote or already out of the game.
The contestant was immune – the immunity could protect from banishment, murder, or both.
The contestant has the right to two votes at the Round Table.

Episode	1	2	3	4	5	6	7	8	9	10	11	12
Traitors' Decision	None	Ivan	Silvia	Bobby	Iskra	Vlado	Maya	Dayana	Olya	Mirela	Vlado	None
Traitors' Decision	None	Ivan	Silvia	Bobby	Iskra	Gloria	Maya	Dayana	Olya	Mirela	Venci	None
Traitors' Decision	None	Murder				Neve	Ultimatum	Murder			Ultimatum; Murder	None
Traitors' Decision	None	Murder				Anton	Anton	Murder			Ultimatum; Murder	None
Traitors' Decision	None	Murder				Trial	Murder	Murder			Ultimatum; Murder	None
Shield	Gamov, Maya	Bachorski, Gloria, Petkanov, Dayana, Eva, Iskra, Yordan, Mira, Mirela, Tino, Toma	Maya, Tino	Yordan, Anna-Maria, Venci, Georgi	Petkanov, Tino, Yordan, Mirela	Gloria	Mirela, Tino, Yordan, Anna-Maria, Olya	Maya	Eva	Gloria	None	
Banishment	None	Mira	Toma	Georgi	Gamov	Neve	Tino	Yordan	Anna-Maria	Maya	None	Bachorski
Vote	None	12–7	8–3–2–2–1–1–1–1	10–3–2–1–1–1–1	7–6–1–1–1–1	13–2–1	8–5–1	6–3–1–1–1	7–1–1–1	4–3–1	None	3–2–1
Eva	No vote	Mirela	Mirela	Georgi	Anna-Maria	Neve	Tino	Yordan	Anna-Maria	Maya	No vote	Bachorski
Gloria	No vote	Mira	Gamov	Petkanov	Gamov	Neve	Mirela	Anna-Maria	Anna-Maria	Kodzhabashev	No vote	Kodzhabashev
Kodzhabashev	Out of game		Immunity	Georgi	Gamov	Eva	Tino	Petkanov	Petkanov	Maya	No vote	Bachorski
Petkanov	No vote	Mira	Gamov	Georgi	Anna-Maria	Neve	Tino	Yordan	Kodzhabashev	Vlado	No vote	Kodzhabashev
Bachorski	No vote	Mira	Bobby	Georgi	Gamov	Neve	Tino	Yordan	Anna-Maria	Kodzhabashev	No vote	Petkanov
Venci	No vote	Mira	Toma	Gamov	Gamov	Neve	Tino	Mirela	Anna-Maria	Maya	Murdered (Ep. 11)	
Vlado	No vote	Mira	Bachorski	Georgi	Anna-Maria	Neve	Tino	Yordan	Anna-Maria	Maya	Murdered (Ep. 11)	
Maya	No vote	Mirela	Dayana	Gamov	Gamov	Neve	Tino	Yordan	Anna-Maria	Kodzhabashev	Banished (Ep. 10)	
Mirela	No vote	No vote	Toma	Anna-Maria	Neve	Neve	Tino	Yordan	Anna-Maria	Murdered (Ep. 10)		
Anna-Maria	No vote	Mira	Toma	Petkanov	Gamov	Neve	Vlado	Vlado	Vlado	Banished (Ep. 9)		
Olya	Out of game		Immunity	Anton	Gamov	Neve	Vlado	Vlado	Murdered (Ep. 9)			
Yordan	No vote	Mira	Toma	Georgi	Eva	Eva	Vlado	Vlado	Banished (Ep. 8)			
Dayana	Kodzhabashev, Dilyana, Olya	Mirela	Toma	Iskra	Anna-Maria	Neve	Vlado	Murdered (Ep. 8)				
Tino	No vote	Mira	Toma	Georgi	Gloria	Neve	Vlado	Banished (Ep. 7)				
Anton	No vote	Mirela	Yordan	Yordan	Anna-Maria	Neve	Murdered (Ep. 7)					
Neve	No vote	Mirela	Dayana	Georgi	Mirela	Anton	Banished (Ep. 6)					
Gamov	No vote	Mirela	Dayana	Georgi	Anna-Maria	Banished (Ep. 5)						
Iskra	No vote	Mira	Toma	Georgi	Murdered (Ep. 5)							
Georgi	No vote	Mira	Bobby	Gamov	Banished (Ep. 4)							
Bobby	No vote	Mirela	Toma	Murdered (Ep. 4)								
Toma	No vote	Mira	Iskra	Banished (Ep. 3)								
Silvia	No vote	Mira	Murdered (Ep. 3)									
Mira	No vote	No vote	Banished (Ep. 2)									
Ivan	No vote	Murdered (Ep. 2)										
Dilyana	Eliminated (Ep. 1)											

=== End game ===
Episode	12	
Decision	End Game	Game Over; Faithfuls Win
Vote	4–0	Game Over; Faithfuls Win
Еva	End Game	Winners
Gloria	End Game	Winners
Kodzhabashev	End Game	Winners
Petkanov	End Game	Winners

=== Episode titles ===
Episodes of Traitors: Igra na predateli (season 1)
No. overall	No. in season	Title	Original release date
1	1	"So krotse, so blago i so malko kyutek" (With kindness, with sweetness, and a little toughness)	September 16, 2025
2	2	"Bravo, predateli, bravo!" (Bravo, Traitors, bravo!)	September 17, 2025
3	3	"Ako sme trima, sme trima! Ako ne sme..." (If we’re three, we’re three! And if we’re not...)	September 23, 2025
4	4	"Na voina kato na voina" (All's fair in war)	September 30, 2025
5	5	"Zatishie pred burya" (Calm before the storm)	October 7, 2025
6	6	"Out of Box"	October 14, 2025
7	7	"Vreme razdelno" (Time of parting)	October 21, 2025
8	8	"Nadezhda vsyaka tuka ostavete" (Надежда всяка тука оставете, or Latin: Timendi causa est nescire)	October 28, 2025
9	9	"Aleluya!" (Hallelujah!)	November 4, 2025
10	10	"Dumam ti dashte, seshtay se snakho" (A word to the wise is enough)	November 11, 2025
11	11	"San v lyatna nosht" (A Midsummer Night's Dream)	November 18, 2025
12	12	"Izkuplenie" (Redemption)	November 25, 2025

== Season 2 ==
=== Contestants ===
List of Traitors: Igra na predateli 2 contestants
Contestant	Age	From	Occupation	Affiliation	Finish
Nedelcho Bogdanov	43	Nesebar	Podcaster & animator	Faithful	Murdered (Episode 2)
Alexandra Zhekova	38	Sofia	Snowboarder	Faithful	Banished (Episode 2)
Yordan Krachunov	27	Sofia	Athlete & IT specialist	Faithful	Murdered (Episode 3)
Maria Chakardakova	33	Gotse Delchev	Folk singer	Faithful	Banished (Episode 3)
Denislava Velkova	26	Sofia	Dog groomer	Faithful	Murdered (Episode 4)
Daniel Varbanov	26	Sofia	Actor	Faithful	Banished (Episode 4)
Mila Mihova	39	Sofia	Opera singer	Faithful	Murdered (Episode 5)
Emil Markov	63	Burgas	Actor	Traitor	Banished (Episode 5)
Georgi Bratoev	38	Sofia	Volleyball player	Faithful	Murdered (Episode 6)
Tea Minkova	33	Sofia	Influencer	Faithful	Banished (Episode 6)
Chris Makarov	29	Sofia	Singer	Traitor	Participating
Emil Konrad	36	Sofia	Writer & vlogger	Faithful	Participating
Kristina Kostova	24	Sofia	Vlogger & speedcuber	Faithful	Participating
Mihaela Zinoviev	32	Pernik	Influencer	Faithful	Participating
Milen Keremedchiev	57	Varna	Politician & diplomat	Traitor	Participating
Nancy Karaboycheva	33	Pazardzhik	Model & TV host	Traitor	Participating
Naum Shopov	32	Sofia	Actor & TV host	Faithful	Participating
Olga Modeva	33	Elin Pelin	Model	Faithful	Participating
Poli Genova	39	Sofia	Singer	Faithful	Participating
Simona Dyankova	31	Varna	Gymnast	Faithful	Participating
Stefani Laleva	27	Sofia	Model	Faithful	Participating
Stoyan Doychev	38	Varna	Actor	Faithful	Participating
Valentin Bratoev	38	Sofia	Volleyball player	Faithful	Participating
Vanya Shtereva	55	Varna	Writer & screenwriter	Faithful	Participating
Ventsislav Mitsov	55	Kyustendil	Musician & politician	Faithful	Participating

=== Elimination history ===
Key

The contestant is a Faithful.
The contestant is a Traitor.
The contestant was murdered by the Traitors.
The contestant was banished at the Round Table.

Episode	1	2	3	4	5	6
Shortlist (Note: The three Traitors compile a shortlist of three players, from which the Secret Traitor (Emil Markov) chooses whom to "murder" during the night.)	None	Krisi, Mila, Nedelcho	None			
Traitors' Decision	None	Nedelcho	Yordan	Denislava	Mila	Georgi
Traitors' Decision	None	Murder				
Shield	Markov	Alex, Daniel, Chris, Krisi, Maria, Naum	Maria, Mihaela, Tea	None	Olga, Simona	Nancy, Naum
Banishment	None	Alex	Maria	Daniel	Markov	Tea
Vote	None	20–2–1–1	12–5–2–1–1–1	12–5–2–1	9–4–2–1–1–1	11–5
Chris	No vote	Georgi	Maria	Daniel	Georgi	Tea
Emil	No vote	Alex	Mila	Daniel	Markov	Tea
Krisi	No vote	Alex	Maria	Daniel	Mihaela	Milen
Mihaela	No vote	Alex	Mila	Mila	Markov	Tea
Milen	No vote	Alex	Maria	Stoyan	Markov	Tea
Nancy	No vote	Alex	Maria	Daniel	Markov	Tea
Naum	No vote	Alex	Maria	Daniel	Ventsi	Milen
Olga	No vote	Alex	Krisi	Krisi	Stefi	Tea
Poli	No vote	Alex	Maria	Daniel	Markov	Tea
Simona	No vote	Alex	Maria	Mila	Markov	Tea
Stefi	No vote	Alex	Maria	Stoyan	Ventsi	Milen
Stoyan	No vote	Alex	Vanya	Daniel	Stefi	Tea
Valyo	No vote	Alex	Georgi	Stoyan	Markov	Tea
Vanya	No vote	Alex	Maria	Stoyan	Ventsi	Milen
Ventsi	No vote	Daniel	Vanya	Daniel	Naum	Tea
Tea	No vote	Alex	Maria	Daniel	Markov	Milen
Georgi	No vote	Alex	Mila	Daniel	Markov	Murdered (Episode 6)
Markov	No vote	Alex	Ventsi	Daniel	Ventsi	Banished (Episode 5)
Mila	No vote	Alex	Maria	Daniel	Murdered (Note: Before leaving the palace, the Traitors secretly nominate four contestants as potential murder victims by marking their busts with lipstick. One of the nominees may also be a Traitor. Naum, Olga, Mila and Mihaela take part in a "game of death" to determine the eventual victim.) (Episode 5)	
Daniel	No vote	Alex	Maria	Stoyan	Banished (Episode 4)	
Denislava	No vote	Alex	Mila	Murdered (Episode 4)		
Maria	No vote	Mila	Mila	Banished (Episode 3)		
Yordan	No vote	Alex	Murdered (Episode 3)			
Alex	No vote	Georgi	Banished (Episode 2)			
Nedelcho	No vote	Murdered (Episode 2)				
