= Survivor Bulgaria 4 =

- Season 4
- Presented by: Evtim Miloshev (until Day 20); Vladimir Karamazov
- No. of days: 52
- No. of castaways: 24
- Winner: Georgi Kehayov
- Runners-up: Iva Prandzheva; Lyudmila Dimitrova
- Location: Caramoan, Camarines Sur, Bicol, Philippines
- No. of episodes: 50

Release
- Original network: bTV
- Original release: 22 September – 21 December 2009

Additional information
- Filming dates: May 17 – July 7, 2009

Season chronology
- ← Previous; Survivor BG: Pearl Islands Next → Survivor BG: Fans vs Favorites

Survivor BG: Conquering Asia - Philippines was the fourth season of the Bulgarian reality television series Survivor BG. The season had 24 contestants competing against each other in the Philippines where they competed for rewards and immunity to avoid being eliminated themselves. After 52 days, the jury decided Georgi Kehayov to win 250,000 leva and the title of Sole Survivor.

The hosts were Evtim Miloshev until the 22nd day and for the rest of the show was again Vladimir Karamazov. The season premiered on 22 September 2009 on bTV. The season final was aired on 21 December 2009 on bTV with Georgi Kehayov winning 250,000 leva and the title of Sole Survivor.

For the first time in any Survivor franchise, a contestant died during filming. Noncho Vodenicharov suffered a fatal heart attack following a physical challenge.

== Contestants ==
Contestant	Original Tribe	First Switched Tribe	Second Switched Tribe	Merged Tribe	Result	Finish
Indira Kasimova; 22, Sofia	Tayak				1st Voted Out; Day 4	24th
Maria Kalenderska; 24, Sofia	Pitogo				2nd Voted Out; Day 7	23rd
Plamen Penev; 23, Sofia	Mindanao				Quit; Day 9	22nd
Ralitsa Kirilova; 28, Sofia	Pitogo				3rd Voted Out; Day 10	21st
Georgi Petkov; 29, Sofia	Pitogo				4th Voted Out; Day 13	20th
Noncho Vodenicharov; 53, Radnevo	Tayak				Died; Day 14	19th
Svetoslav Barkanichkov; 35, Pleven	Tayak				Quit; Day 18	18th
Svetlin Zanev; 35, Varna	Tayak				5th Voted Out; Day 18	17th
Emanuela Badeva; 22, Sofia	Tayak	Pitogo			Quit; Day 21	16th
Ivan Jochkolovski; 24, Chicago	Tayak	Mindanao			6th Voted Out; Day 24	15th
Nikolay Koychev; 36, Dimitrovgrad	Mindanao	Mindanao	Pitogo		7th Voted Out; Day 25	14th
Verislav Tudjarov; 21, Sofia	Tayak	Pitogo	Pitogo		8th Voted Out; Day 27	13th
Ralitsa Ginkova; 25, London	Mindanao	Mindanao	Mindanao		9th Voted Out; Day 30	12th
Zlatina Dimitrova; 22, Burgas	Tayak	Mindanao	Mindanao	Lapu Lapu	10th Voted Out; 1st Jury Member; Day 33	11th
Dimitar Hodzhev "Mityo Krika"; 33, Sofia	Pitogo	Pitogo	Mindanao	Lapu Lapu	11th Voted Out; 2nd Jury Member; Day 36	10th
Julieta Okot; 40, New York City	Pitogo	Pitogo	Pitogo	Lapu Lapu	12th Voted Out; 3rd Jury Member; Day 39	9th
Hristina Ruseva; 29, Sofia	Mindanao	Mindanao	Pitogo	Lapu Lapu	13th Voted Out; 4th Jury Member; Day 42	8th
Lyudmila Ivanova; 42, Sofia	Mindanao	Mindanao	Pitogo	Lapu Lapu	14th Voted Out; 5th Jury Member; Day 45	7th
Lyuben Ivanov; 26, Sofia	Pitogo	Pitogo	Mindanao	Lapu Lapu	15th Voted Out; 6th Jury Member; Day 48	6th
Margarita Amidzhirova; 22, Sofia	Tayak	Mindanao	Mindanao	Lapu Lapu	Lost challenge 7th Jury Member; Day 50	5th
Kiril Haralampiev; 29, Sofia	Pitogo	Pitogo	Mindanao	Lapu Lapu	Lost challenge 8th Jury Member; Day 50	4th
Lyudmila Dimitrova; 31, Sofia	Pitogo	Pitogo	Pitogo	Lapu Lapu	2nd Runner Up; Day 52	3rd
Iva Prandzheva; 37, Plovdiv	Pitogo	Pitogo	Pitogo	Lapu Lapu	Runner-up; Day 52	2nd
Georgi Kehayov; 19, Dobrinishte	Mindanao	Mindanao	Mindanao	Lapu Lapu	Sole Survivor; Day 52	1st

== Characteristics ==
The fourth season of the show featured Leaders' battle and The Necklace of Tribal Predominance. In the original tribes each episode all the tribes must choose The Leader of the Tribe. Then, the leaders face each other in a challenge and the winner takes a reward (mostly food) and an Immunity Necklace for the next Tribal Council. After the Union, The Immunity challenge was replaced by a challenge for The Necklace of Tribal Predominance. The winner, as well as having immunity for the next council, have to choose four members of the tribe and give then The Black Vote Necklaces. After that, the tribe votes only for those four members and the one received the majority of the votes is eliminated. Also, this season featured The Exile Island. In this version of the show, this player sent on that island don't take part in the Tribal Council and cannot be eliminated. There is a battle each episode, in which two survivors take part: the one who is on the island at the moment and the one sent there by the winner of the reward challenge. The winner has the choice: to stay on the island and take provisions for several days or to go back to the main tribe.

== Challenges ==
=== Tribal Phase ===
Week	Challenges				Eliminated	Vote	Finish
Week	Reward	Leader Battle	Immunity	Individual Immunity	Eliminated	Vote	Finish
1	Pitogo			Noncho	Indira	5–4	1st Voted Out; Day 4
2	Tayak	Svetlin	Tayak	Iva	Maria	6–2–1	2nd Voted Out; Day 7
3	Tayak	Kiril	Tayak	~~Ralitsa K.~~ (Iva)	Plamen	No Vote	Quit; Day 9
3	Tayak	Kiril	Tayak	~~Ralitsa K.~~ (Iva)	Ralitsa K.	4-4	3rd Voted Out; Day 10
4	Pitogo	None	Tayak	Iva	Georgi P.	5–2	4th Voted Out; Day 13
5	Pitogo	Kiril	Pitogo	None	Noncho	No Vote	Died; Day 14
6	Tayak & Pitogo	~~Svetlin~~ (Margarita)	Mindanao & Pitogo	None	Svetoslav	No Vote	Quit; Day 18
6	Tayak & Pitogo	~~Svetlin~~ (Margarita)	Mindanao & Pitogo	None	Svetlin	5–0	5th Voted Out; Day 18
7	Pitogo	Kiril & Iva	None	None	Emanuela	No vote	Quit; Day 21
8	Mindanao	Nikolay & Ivan	Pitogo	Hristina	Ivan	5–3	6th Voted Out; Day 24
9	None	None	Mindanao	None	Nikolay	4–3	7th Voted Out; Day 25
10	None	None	Mindanao	Iva	Verislav	5–1	8th Voted Out; Day 27
11	Mindanao	Julieta	Pitogo	Krika	Ralitsa G.	5–2	9th Voted Out; Day 30

1.Contestant Noncho Vodenicharov died of a heart attack during filming.

=== Individual Phase ===
Week	Challenges				Eliminated	Vote	Finish
Week	Reward	Duel Exile Island	Immunity	Double-Vote Amulet	Eliminated	Vote	Finish
12	Kiril (shared with Iva)	Lyusi I. (Send)	Julieta	Kiril	Zlatina	6–5	10th Voted Out; 1st Jury Member; Day 33
13	Iva, Margarita, Julieta, Lyusi D.	Kiril (over Lyusi I.)	Iva	Megi	Krika	8–1–1	11th Voted Out; 2nd Jury Member; Day 36
14	Survivor auction (Hristina sent Lyubo)	Kiril (over Lyubo)	Lyubo	Hristina	Julieta	7–1–1	12th Voted Out; 3rd Jury Member; Day 39
15	Hristina (shared with Margarita)	Kiril (over Lyubo)	Lyubo	Iva	Hristina	5–3	13th Voted Out; 4th Jury Member; Day 42
16	Iva (shared with Lyusi I.)	Kiril (over Georgi)	Georgi	Iva	Lyusi I.	4–2–1	14th Voted Out; 5th Jury Member; Day 45
17	Lyubo, Margarita, Iva	Georgi (over Kiril)	Iva	Kiril	Lyubo	3-3	15th Voted Out; 6th Jury Member; Day 48
18	None				Margarita	None	Lost Challenge; 7th Jury Member; Day 50
18	None				Kiril	None	Lost Challenge; 8th Jury Member; Day 50
19	Jury Vote				Lyusi D.	5–3–0	2nd Runner-Up; Day 52
19	Jury Vote				Iva	5–3–0	Runner-Up; Day 52
19	Jury Vote				Georgi	5–3–0	Sole Survivor; Day 52

=== Black vote necklaces ===
Episode	Necklace of Tribal Predominance	Black Vote Necklaces				Eliminated
12	Julieta	Zlatina	Margarita	Iva	Georgi	Zlatina
13	Iva	Krika	Hristina	Lyusi I	Georgi	Krika
14	Lyubo	Julieta	Hristina	Lyusi D.	Iva	Julieta
15	Lyubo	Hristina	Lyusi I.	Lyusi D.	Iva	Hristina
16	Georgi	Lyusi I.	Margarita	Lyusi D.	Iva	Lyusi I.
17	Iva	Lyubo	Margarita	Kiril	Lyusi D.	Lyubo

== Voting History ==
=== Tribal Phase ===
#	Original Tribe								First Switched Tribe		Second Switched Tribe		
Episode #:	3	6	8	9	12	14	16		19	22	24	25	28
Voted Out:	Indira	Maria	Plamen	Ralitsa K.	Georgi P.	Noncho	Svetoslav	Svetlin	Emanuela	Ivan	Nikolay	Verislav	Ralitsa G.
Votes	5-4	6-2-1	Quit	4-4	5-2	Died	Quit	5-0	Quit	5-3	4-3	5-1	5-2
Georgi K.								Svetlin		Ivan			Zlatina
Iva		Maria		Georgi P	Georgi P						Nikolay	Verislav	
Lyusi D.		Maria		Ralitsa K	Georgi P						Nikolay	Verislav	
Kiril		Julieta		Georgi P	Georgi P								Ralitsa G
Margarita	Indira									Georgi K			Ralitsa G
Lyubo		Lyusi D		Georgi P	Georgi P								Ralitsa G
Lyusi I.								Svetlin		Ivan	Verislav	Verislav	
Hristina								Svetlin		Ivan	Verislav	Verislav	
Julieta		Maria		Ralitsa K	Georgi P						Nikolay	Verislav	
Krika		Maria		Ralitsa K	Lyubo								Ralitsa G
Zlatina	Indira									Georgi K			Ralitsa G
Ralitsa G.								Svetlin		Ivan			Zlatina
Verislav	Indira										Nikolay	Hristina	
Nikolay								Svetlin		Ivan	Verislav		
Ivan	Indira									Georgi K			
Emanuela	Verislav												
Svetlin	Indira												
Svetoslav	Verislav												
Noncho	Verislav												
Georgi P.		Maria		Ralitsa K	Lyubo								
Ralitsa K.		Maria		Georgi P									
Plamen													
Maria		Lyusi D											
Indira	Verislav												

=== Individual Phase ===
#	Merged Tribe														Jury Vote		
Episode #:	32		35		38		41		44		47		49		50		
Voted Out:	Zlatina		Krika		Julieta		Hristina		Lyusi I.		Lyubo		Margarita	Kiril	Lyusi D.	Iva	Georgi K.
Votes	6-5		8-1-1		7-1-1		5-3		4-2-1		3-3		Challenge	Challenge	5-3-0		
Georgi K.	Zlatina		Krika		Julieta		Iva		Iva		Exiled				Jury Vote		
Iva	Zlatina		Krika		Julieta		Hristina	Hristina	Lyusi I	Lyusi I	Lyubo				Jury Vote		
Lyusi D.	Zlatina		Krika		Julieta		Hristina		Lyusi I		Lyubo				Jury Vote		
Kiril	Georgi K	Georgi K	Exiled		Exiled		Exiled		Exiled		Lyusi D	Lyusi D					Georgi K
Margarita	Georgi K		Krika	Krika	Julieta		Hristina		Lyusi I		Lyubo					Iva	
Lyubo	Georgi K		Hristina		Iva		Iva		Iva		Lyusi D						Georgi K
Lyusi I.	Exiled		Krika		Julieta		Hristina		Margarita								Georgi K
Hristina	Zlatina		Krika		Julieta	Julieta	Iva									Iva	
Julieta	Zlatina		Krika		Lyusi D.												Georgi K
Krika	Zlatina		Georgi K														Georgi K
Zlatina	Georgi K															Iva	
Ralitsa G.																	
Verislav																	
Nikolay																	
Ivan																	
Emanuela																	
Svetlin																	
Svetoslav																	
Noncho																	
Georgi P.																	
Ralitsa K.																	
Plamen																	
Maria																	
Indira																	
