= Bashar Rahal =

Bulgarian actor and producer (born 1974)

- Born: Bashar Mounzer Rahal; 20 October 1974 (age 51); Dubai, United Arab Emirates
- Citizenship: Bulgarian; Lebanese; American
- Occupations: Actor, Producer
- Years active: 1989–present
- Spouse: Kalina Rahal (m. 2002; div. 2024)
- Children: Chloe Rahal, India Rahal, Andy Rahal
- Parent: Mounzer Rahal (father)
- Relatives: Carla Rahal (sister)

Bashar Mounzer Rahal (Bulgarian: Башар Мунзер Рахал, Arabic: بشار رحال; born 20 October 1974) is a Bulgarian actor.

== Life and career ==
=== Early life ===
Bashar Rahal was born in Dubai, UAE, the son of Lebanese father Mounzer Rahal and Bulgarian mother Mariana Rahal. His sister, Carla Rahal, also an actress, is mostly known for her roles in the National Theater of Bulgaria. Carla is also a pop and R&B singer, songwriter, and producer. She is best known for two of Bulgaria's most popular songs, "Lie to Me" and "I Wish U".

The family moved from UAE to Bulgaria when Bashar was only six years old. He first started acting in TV sketches when he was 12. At the age of 13 he became a member of Tears and Laughs, a professional theater group, with which he took part in more than 15 performances. He also attended numerous international film and theater festivals, including the ones in Avignon, France and Thun, Switzerland.

His first major film role was in 1989, in the controversial at that time Ivan and Alexandra. The film tells the story of two madly in love students in communist Bulgaria. The movie is also a winner of the 1989 Golden Rose Film Festival in Varna. This role was followed by his part in the 1992 movie Bad Boy.

=== Early career ===
His professional acting career began in 1992 when Bashar was accepted at the National Academy of Theater and Film Art (in the class of professor Stefan Danailov, Minister of Culture of Bulgaria during 2005–2009), where he got his master's degree in Performing Arts. During that time, he took part in numerous TV and film productions as well as several commercials. Shortly after graduation he was accepted as a permanent member of the National Youth Theater.

=== Professional career ===
For the next couple of years Bashar appeared in over 25 different TV comedy shows, but his popularity came with the TV show It Can't Be, which was created & directed by Nellie Andreeva – currently an editor for The Hollywood Reporter. It Can't Be was on air for 7 seasons and became one of the highest rated comedy shows in Bulgaria. Similar to Saturday Night Live, It Can't Be was a weekly 40-minute comedy-variety show. Bashar was not only one of the creators of the show, he was also the lead actor, writer, producer and occasionally a director.

Bashar Rahal is also dubbed as the creator of the first ever night show in Bulgaria, where he met his co-host and future wife Kalina Rahal. In 1997, only 22 years old, he became part of the Award-winning anchor team of It Has Began – the highest rated morning show in Bulgaria (executive producer, Mihail Mihailov, after an extensive television career, he became the Press Secretary for the Prime Minister of Bulgaria Ivan Kostov). The same year Bashar Rahal also appeared in two Italian productions, the 1997 TV Movie In Fondo Al Cuore and in the miniseries Racket alongside Italian actor and director Michele Placido. In 1999 he was cast by the film director Egon Günther for the film Else - Geschichte einer leidenschaftlichen Frau.

=== New beginning ===
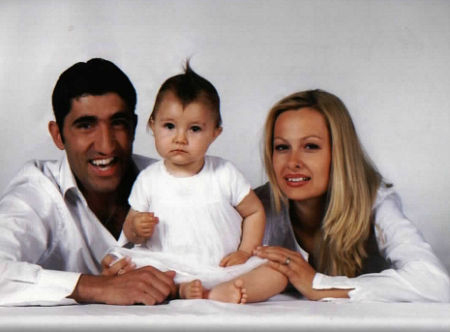
Bashar Rahal with wife Kalina and daughter Chloe in 2007

In 1999, he decided to follow his childhood dream, and immigrated to the United States and settled in California to pursue his acting career. Kalina and Bashar settled in San Diego, where the couple lived for the next six years. During that period Rahal appeared in several US feature films, including the 1999 movie Bridge of Dragons, where he plays alongside Dolph Lundgren. In 2001, he starred as Dmitri Minkov in Operation Delta Force 4: Deep Fault directed by Mark Roper. City of Fear is Rahal's next feature, where he plays opposite Gary Daniels.

In 2006, the family relocated their home to Los Angeles. Shortly afterward, Bashar took part in few major film and TV productions. Some of the projects include a guest role in the critically acclaimed Emmy Award-winning Fox TV series Arrested Development, created by Mitchell Hurwitz and two-time Academy Award-winning American actor, film director, and producer Ron Howard.

Bashar attracted broader public attention with a supporting role in the 2006 BBC Drama/Documentary Hannibal, where he played Hasdrubal, the brother of Hannibal, played by Alexander Siddig (24, Syriana and Kingdom of Heaven).

Bashar Rahal also played in the 2008 movie War, Inc., directed by Joshua Seftel. Among the star cast are three Academy Award winners - Ben Kingsley, Marisa Tomei and Joan Cusack. The lead roles are played by John Cusack, who is also a writer and producer of the movie, and Hilary Duff.

In 2017, Bashar stars in the fifth season of the Bulgarian TV show Kato Dve Kapki Voda.

== Personal life ==
In 1997, on the set of Late Night Show, Bashar met his co-host and future wife Kalina. After arriving in San Diego, in 1999, Kalina started working as a news producer for KUSI-TV.Currently producer at KTLA, 5 Time Emmy Award winner

In 2002, the couple got married in La Jolla, California.

After moving from San Diego to Los Angeles in 2006, Kalina became a producer for KTLA Morning Show.

Kalina and Bashar have two daughters, Chloe and India Rahal. Bashar and Lubomira Basheva have a son Andy Rahal. Andy Rahal was born on May 25 2025

== Filmography ==
Year	Title	Role	Notes
1989	Ivan and Alexandra	Cvetan	
1992	Bad Boy	Dinkata	
1996	Reel Mix		
1996	The Incredible Adventures of Sinbad the Sailor	Voice	
1997	In fondo al cuore	Paolo	
1997	Racket	Francesco	
1998	Un camion pour deux	Captain	
1998	After the End of the World		
1999	Dunav most		
1999	U.S. Seals	Hidalgo	
1999	Else		
1999	Bridge of Dragons	Robert	
1999	Dan Koloff: The King of Catch		
2000	Clinic on the Third Floor	Gipsy	
2001	Disaster	Gamer	
2001	Operation Delta Force 4: Deep Fault	Dmitri Minkov	
2001	City of Fear	Phillips	
2002	Patriotas, Los		
2002	Shark Attack 3: Megalodon	Luis Ruiz	
2002	Nowhere to Hide		
2003	Death Train	Lopez	
2004	Target of Opportunity	Ivan	
2006	Arrested Development	Iraqi Cab Driver	
2006	Hannibal	Hasdrubal	
2006	Basilisk: The Serpent King	Bedouin Leader	
2006	The Untitled Onion Movie	Terrorist	
2007	Dark Streets	Bartender	
2007	Matroesjka's 2	Boris	
2008	War, Inc.	Video Guy One	
2008	The Shepherd	Soldier One	
2008	Monster Ark	The Leader	
2008	Sharks in Venice	Medical Examiner	
2008	The Unit	Cleric	
2009	The Tournament	Asaf Sadiq	
2009	Direct Contact	General Drago	
2009	My Name Is Earl	Arab Man	
2010	24	General Wasim	1 episode
2010	Footsteps in the Sand	Hanny	
2011	Conan	Quarter Master	
2012	El Gringo	Officer Sullivan	
2012	Glass Home	Stefan Shakaliev	
2012	House Arrest		Episode: "Bitterly"
2014	The Legend of Hercules	Battalion Commander #1	
2014	Autómata	Doctor	
2015	Survivor	Militiaman #2	
2015	The 11th Grade	Ivan, Lina's husband	
2016	Boyka: Undisputed	Scout # 2	
2017	Vivegam	Russian mafia gangster	Indian Tamil film; uncredited
2017	Your Face Sounds Familiar (Bulgaria)	Himself (contestant)	Season 5
2018	211	Major Rahimi	
2019	Reunion	Branimir Vasilev	
2020	Brothers	Gavrilov	Season 1
