= Paper Dove (film) =

2003 film

- Promotional release poster
- Directed by: Fabrizio Aguilar
- Written by: Fabrizio Aguilar
- Starring: Antonio Callirgos
- Release date: 25 September 2003
- Running time: 90 minutes
- Country: Peru
- Language: Spanish

Paper Dove (Spanish: Paloma de papel) is a 2003 Peruvian drama film written and directed by Fabrizio Aguilar. It was selected as the Peruvian entry for the Best Foreign Language Film at the 76th Academy Awards, but it was not nominated.

== Cast ==
- Antonio Callirgos as Juan
- Eduardo Cesti as Viejo
- Aristóteles Picho as Fermin
- Liliana Trujillo as Domitila
- Sergio Galliani as Wilmer
- Melania Urbina as Yeni

== See also ==
- List of submissions to the 76th Academy Awards for Best Foreign Language Film
- List of Peruvian submissions for the Academy Award for Best International Feature Film
