= Hannibal (2006 film) =

2006 British television film

- Written by: Matthew Faulk; Mark Skeet
- Directed by: Edward Bazalgette
- Starring: Alexander Siddig; Bashar Rahal
- Country of origin: United Kingdom
- Original language: English

Production
- Producer: Ailsa Orr
- Running time: 90 min.

Original release
- Network: BBC One
- Release: 14 May 2006

Hannibal (also known as Hannibal: Rome's Worst Nightmare) is a 2006 television film, presented as a dramatised documentary, made by the BBC. It is narrated by Kenneth Cranham.

The film is chiefly centred on the Italian campaign of Hannibal, the famous Carthaginian general during the Second Punic War.

== Cast ==
Carthaginians

- Alexander Siddig as Hannibal, supreme commander of the Carthaginian army.
- Emilio Doorgashingh as Maharbal, chief cavalry commander and second-in-command of the Carthaginian army.
- Bashar Rahal as Hasdrubal, Hannibal's younger brother and the commander of the Spanish provinces.
- Mido Hamada as Mago, Hannibal's youngest brother and the infantry commander.
- Histro Mitzkov as Gisgo, an officer in Hannibal's army who notably comments on the strength of the Roman army at Cannae. This earns Hannibal's comment that, while there are indeed a lot of Romans, none of them are called Gisgo.

Romans

- Shaun Dingwall as Scipio Africanus, the Roman general who finally defeated Hannibal.
- Tristan Gemmill as Varro, the consul defeated at Cannae.
- Ben Cross as Fabius Maximus, Dictator and author of the Fabian strategy.

== Reception ==
Cinemagazine rated the film 4 stars.
