= I Always Wanted to Be a Saint =

2003 film

- Directed by: Geneviève Mersch
- Written by: Geneviève Mersch
- Starring: Marie Kremer
- Release date: 16 May 2003
- Running time: 90 minutes
- Country: Luxembourg
- Language: French

I Always Wanted to Be a Saint (French: J'ai toujours voulu être une sainte) is a 2003 Luxembourgish drama film directed by Geneviève Mersch. It was selected as the Luxembourgish entry for the Best Foreign Language Film at the 76th Academy Awards, but it was not nominated.

== Cast ==
- Marie Kremer as Norah
- Thierry Lefevre as Jean-Michel
- Jeannine Godinas as Marthe
- Raphaëlle Blancherie as Françoise
- Francisco Pestana as L'avocat
- Barbara Roland as Elsa

== See also ==
- List of submissions to the 76th Academy Awards for Best Foreign Language Film
- List of Luxembourgish submissions for the Academy Award for Best International Feature Film
