= Geneviève Mersch =

Luxembourgish screenwriter and film director (born 1963)

- Born: 17 January 1963; Kirchberg

Geneviève Mersch (born 17 January 1963) is a Luxembourgish film director and screenwriter best known for the feature film J'ai toujours voulu être une sainte ("I Always Wanted to Be a Saint," 2003).

== Biography ==
Geneviève Mersch was born on 17 January 1963 in Kirchberg. She graduated from the Institut des arts de diffusion in Belgium.

Her documentary short film Le Pont rouge ("The Red Bridge", 1991) is about the Grand Duchess Charlotte Bridge and its effects on the residents of Plaffenthal, particularly the over one hundred suicides from the bridge since its construction. Her documentary Plein d'essence (58 min., 2007) interviews drivers stopping at the Berchem service station. It was awarded best documentary at the Luxembourg Film Awards.

In her film John (1995), a young Belgian woman creates a video diary for her boyfriend in Boston which becomes a documentary about a disintegrating relationship. J'ai toujours voulu être une sainte (2003) was Mersch's first feature film. It follows teenaged Norah, played by actress Marie Kremer in her debut role. Norah struggles with the breakup of her parents' marriage, her tendency to user other people as her altruistic projects, and her obsession with the death of her childhood hero, a race car driver. The film was awarded the Golden Zenith for Best First Feature film at the Montreal World Film Festival and it was awarded the Luxembourg Film Award. It was selected as the Luxembourgish entry for the Best Foreign Language Film at the 76th Academy Awards, but it was not nominated.

== Filmography ==
- Mama boit, papa boxe (1987)
- Mégapolis (1988)
- La Balade de Billie (1989)
- Le Pont rouge ("The Red Bridge", 21 min., 1991)
- Le Courage (1992)
- Sentimental Journey (1994)
- John (1995)
- Roger (1996)
- Shahnaz (1996)
- Ann Vinck. Portrait d'artiste (1996)
- Ilwwer an eriwwer. Au milieu coule une frontière (1996)
- Liliane Heidelberger. Portrait d'artiste (1998)
- Verrouillage central (11 min., 2000)
- J'ai toujours voulu être une sainte (92 min., 2003)
- Plein d'essence (58 min., 2007)
