= Ivan Nitchev =

Bulgarian film director

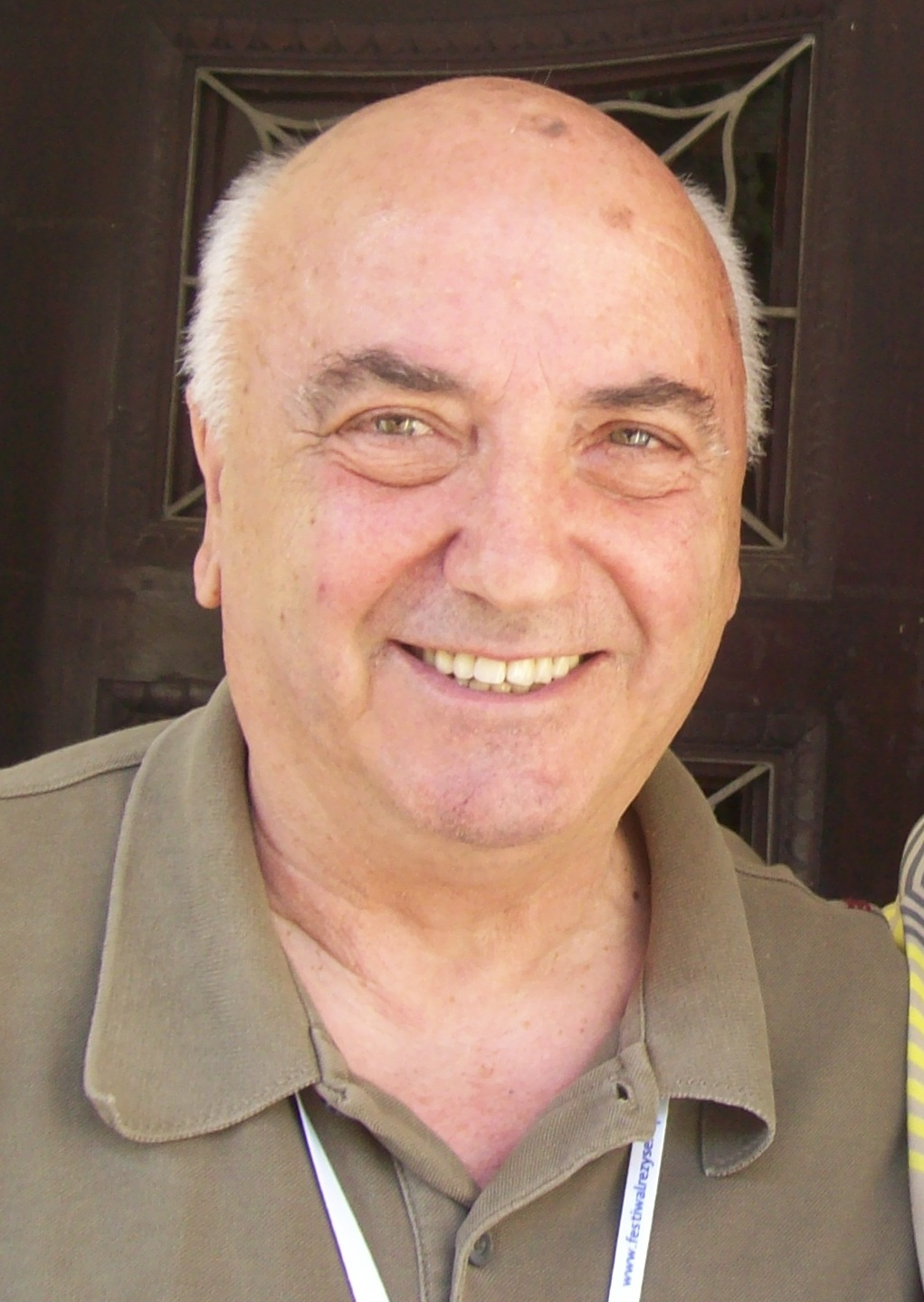
- Born: 31 July 1940 (age 85); Kazanlak, Bulgaria
- Occupations: Film director Screenwriter
- Years active: 1972-present

Ivan Nitchev (Bulgarian: Иван Ничев; born 31 July 1940) is a Bulgarian film director and screenwriter.

== Education and Career ==
He has directed 16 films since 1972. His 1989 film Ivan and Alexandra was entered into the 39th Berlin International Film Festival. His 2014 film Bulgarian Rhapsody was the Bulgarian entry for the Best Foreign Language Film at the 87th Academy Awards.

He graduated from the State Academy for Theater and Film in Łódź, Poland. In 1978 he became a teacher for film and television directing at the NATFA, where he is the dean of the Screen Arts Faculty. He directed over 15 feature films which have numerous national and international awards.

== Filmography ==
- Bulgarian Rhapsody (2014)
- Children of Wax (2005)
- Journey to Jerusalem (2003)
- After the End of the World (1998)
- Love Dreams (1994)
- Ganjo bay starts in Europe (1991)
- Ganjo Bay (1990)
- Ivan and Alexandra (1989)
- Black Swan (1984)
- Royal Game (1982)
- Human holidays (1981)
- Ball Singles (1981)
- Boomerang (1979)
- Stars in Her Hair, Tears in Her Eyes (1977)
- Memory (1974)
- Human heart (1972)
