= Marie Kremer =

Belgian actress

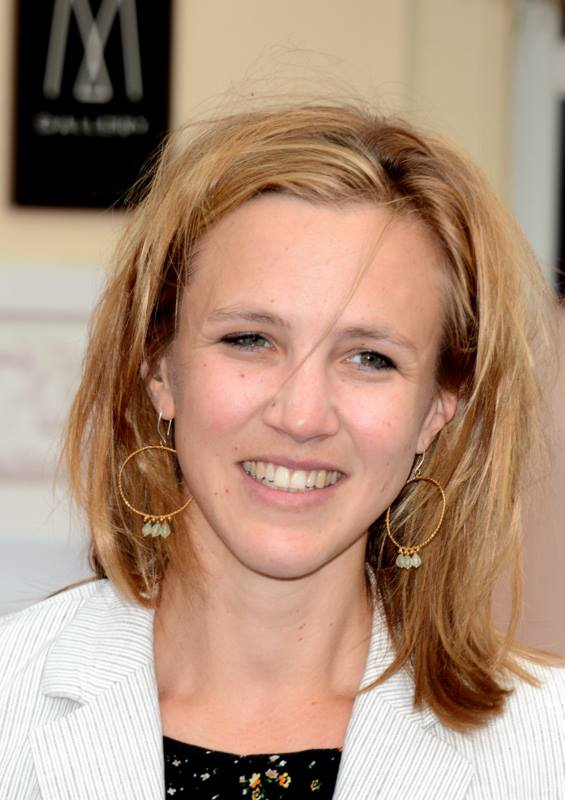
- Marie Kremer at the 2013 César Awards
- Born: 15 April 1982 (age 44); Uccle, Belgium
- Occupation: Actress

Marie Kremer (born 15 April 1982) is a Belgian actress. Her first leading role was in the 2003 movie I Always Wanted to be a Saint (J'ai toujours voulu être une sainte)., for which she won the Créteil International Women's Film Festival's Female Talent Award. After that, she played in St.Jacques-La Mecque, a film about a group of people on their way to Santiago de Compostela. She is also to be seen in Caché (directed by Michael Haneke, well known from his movie "Funny Games"), and also in Ravages, a film from Christophe Lamotte, Blame it on Fidel and Beneath the rooftops of Paris. In 2012 she was nominated for the Magritte Award for Best Supporting Actress.

Kremer is a native speaker of French. She also speaks fluent English and Dutch, as well as some Spanish and Italian.

From 2009 to 2017, she was a cast member of Un village français.

== Filmography ==
=== Film ===
- 2003: J'ai toujours voulu être une sainte: Norah
- 2005: Saint-Jacques… La Mecque: Camille
- 2005: Caché: Jeannette
- 2005: Le Couperet: Judy Rick
- 2006: Charell: hotel maid
- 2006: Quand j'étais chanteur
- 2006: Dikkenek: Fabienne
- 2006: Mon fils à moi: Suzanne
- 2006: Mon colonel : Thérèse
- 2006: La Faute à Fidel!: Isabelle
- 2006: Les Ambitieux: Marie
- 2007: Michou d'Auber: stationery seller
- 2007: Les Toits de Paris: Julie
- 2007: Survivre avec les loups: Janine
- 2008: Bientôt j'arrête: Chanel
- 2009: Soeur Sourire: Françoise
- 2009: Le Bel Âge (or L'Insurgée): Marie
- 2011: Holidays by the Sea

=== Television ===
- 2003: Péril imminent, TV film: Clémentine Ercourt
- 2007: Chez Maupassant, TV series, episode Histoire d'une fille de ferme: Rose Janvier
- 2007: Ravages, TV film: Florence
- 2009: Mac Orlan, TV series, episode Jusqu'au bout du monde: Cyrielle
- 2009: Contes et nouvelles du XIXe siècle, TV series, episode Le bonheur dans le crime: Claire Stassin
- 2009–2017: Un village français, TV series: Lucienne Borderie
- 2010: Les Vivants et les Morts, TV series
- 2010: Profilage, TV series: Louise
- 2017: Transferts, TV series: Oriane Mareuil

== Awards ==
- Créteil International Women's Film Festival 2004 : Prix du talent féminin, for J'ai toujours voulu être une sainte
