= Journey to Jerusalem (film) =

2003 film

- Directed by: Ivan Nitchev
- Written by: Yurii Dachev
- Starring: Elena Petrova
- Release date: October 2003
- Running time: 112 minutes
- Country: Bulgaria
- Language: Bulgarian

Journey to Jerusalem (Bulgarian: Пътуване към Йерусалим) is a 2003 Bulgarian drama film directed by Ivan Nitchev. It was selected as the Bulgarian entry for the Best Foreign Language Film at the 76th Academy Awards, but it was not nominated.

== Cast ==
- Elena Petrova
- Aleksandr Morfov
- Vasil Vasilev-Zueka
- Tatyana Lolova
- Georgi Rusev
- Reni Vrangova
- Hristo Garbov

== See also ==
- List of submissions to the 76th Academy Awards for Best Foreign Language Film
- List of Bulgarian submissions for the Academy Award for Best International Feature Film
