= Karin Okolie =

Bulgarian sprinter

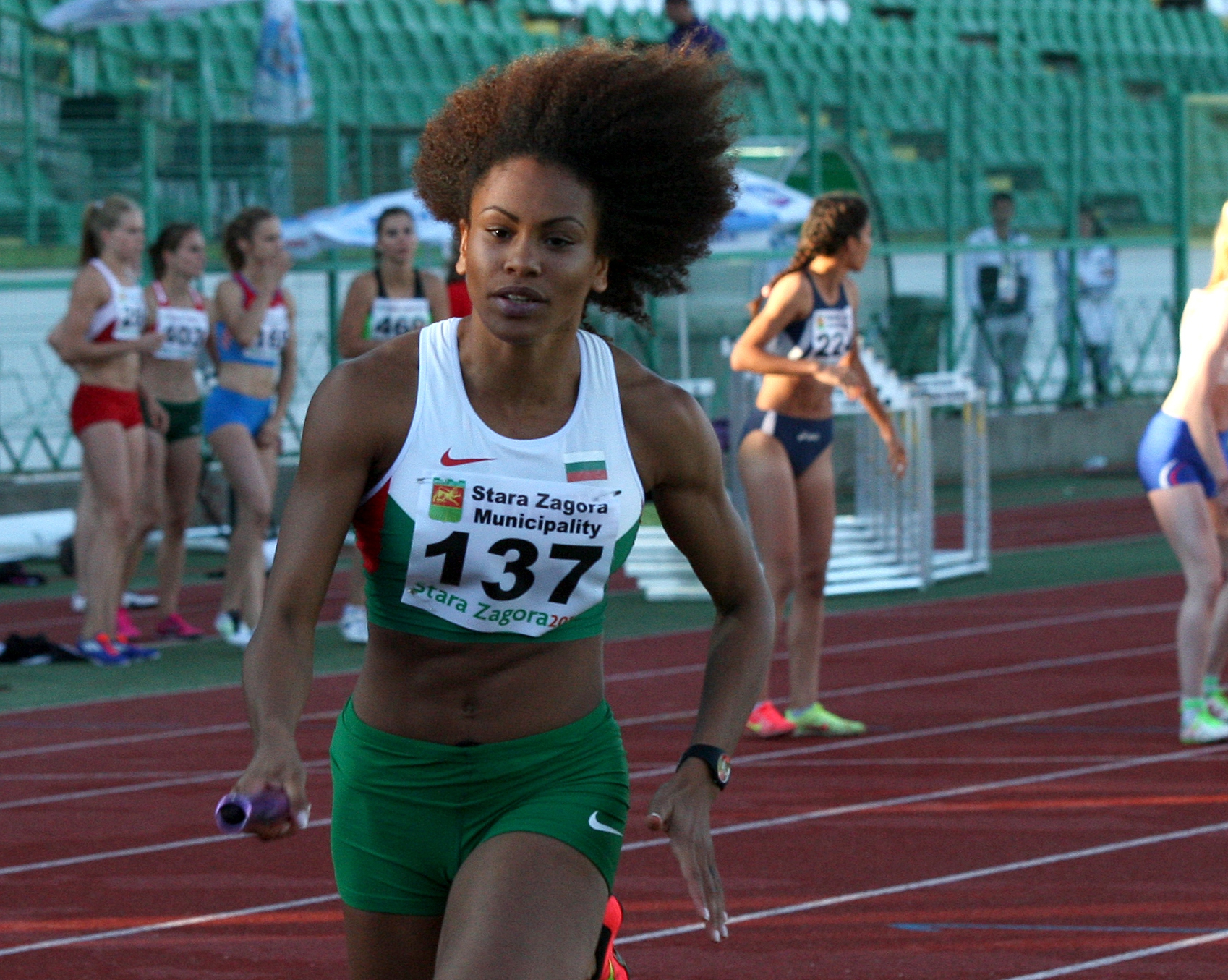
- Karin Okolie (Bulgaria) at the 2015 IAAF European Championships

Personal information
- Nationality: Bulgaria
- Born: 1 May 1994 (age 32) Sofia, Bulgaria
- Education: New Bulgarian University
- Height: 176 cm (5 ft 9 in)
- Weight: 59 kg (130 lb)

Sport
- Sport: Running
- Event(s): 100 metres, 200 metres

Achievements and titles
- Personal best(s): 100m: 11.82; 200m: 23.97; 400m: 54.74
Medal record
Women's Athletics
Representing Bulgaria
European Championships
Silver medal – second place	2015 European Championships in Bulgaria	4x100m

Karin Okolie (Bulgarian: Карин Околие, born May 1, 1994, in Sofia) is a Bulgarian athlete who specialises in the women's 100 metres and 200 metres sprint events. In 2022, she was a participant in the 6th season of Survivor BG.

== Career overview ==
=== Senior career ===
At the 2015 European Athletics Championships, she finished 2nd in the women's 4 × 400 m.

=== Personal ===
Okolie's mother is Bulgarian while her father is from Nigeria.

=== Podcast ===
In 2020, Okolie launched Kari's calling.

== Statistics ==
=== Personal bests ===
Event	Date	Venue	Time (seconds)
100 metres	13 July 2012	Sliven, Bulgaria	11.82
200 metres	12 July 2012	Barcelona, Spain	23.97
400 metres	2 May 2012	Sofia, Bulgaria	54.74
4x400 metres	20 June 2015	Stara Zagora, Bulgaria	3.38.78

- All information from IAAF Profile
