= Anjela Nedyalkova =

Bulgarian actress (born 1991)

- Анжела Недялкова
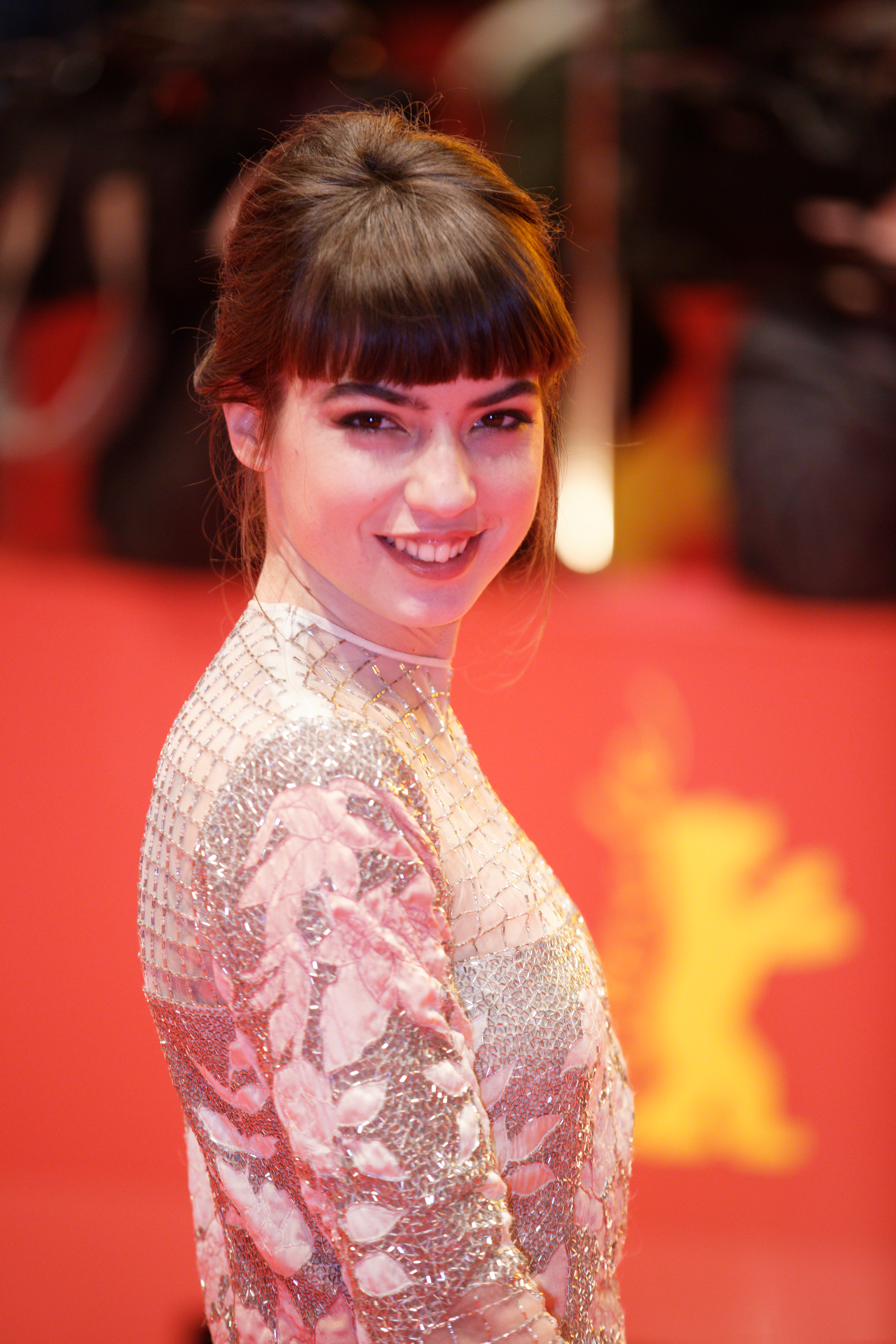
- Anjela Nedyalkova in 2017
- Born: March 2, 1991 (age 34); Sofia, Bulgaria
- Occupation: Actress
- Years active: 2009–present

Anjela Nedyalkova (Bulgarian: Анжела Недялкова; born March 2, 1991) is a Bulgarian actress.

== Education ==
Nedyalkova went to the Krastyo Sarafov National Academy for Theatre and Film Arts in Sofia to study film directing, but dropped out. She began her acting career in 2009.

== Career ==
In 2011, she took on the title role of the young hitchhiker Avé in the Bulgarian film Ave. In 2014, she played Shelli in the film Bulgarian Rhapsody. In 2014, she played a young model lured into prostitution in the Dutch film The Paradise Suite. In 2017, she played the part of Veronika, Sick Boy's girlfriend, in the feature film T2 Trainspotting.

== Filmography ==
Year	Title	Role	Notes
2009	Eastern Plays	Anjela	
2011	Avé	Avé	
2014	Bulgarian Rhapsody	Shelli	
2015	The Paradise Suite	Jenya	
2015	The Petrov File		
2015-16	Liaisons	Dara	
2017	T2 Trainspotting	Veronika	
2018	Ibiza	Custodia	

== Awards ==
- Sofia International Film Festival
  - 2016: Special Mention for The Paradise Suite
- SUBTITLE European Film Festival
  - 2015: Angela Award for Best Actress for The Paradise Suite
