= Vladimir Karamazov =

Bulgarian actor, producer and photographer

- Владимир Карамазов
- Born: Vladimir Aleksandrov; 27 April 1979 (age 47); Sofia, Bulgaria
- Education: National Academy for Theatre and Film Arts
- Occupations: Actor; producer; photographer
- Years active: 2000–present

Vladimir Karamazov (né Aleksandrov; Bulgarian: Владимир Карамазов; born 27 April 1979) is a Bulgarian actor, producer, and photographer. In 2013, he was awarded the "Golden Century" diploma for contribution to culture. The award is given by the Ministry of Culture of Republic of Bulgaria.

== Biography ==
Karamazov was born 27 April 1979, in Sofia, Bulgaria. He received classical drama theater training at the National Academy for Theatre and Film Arts in Sofia. In 2002, he joined the National Theater "Ivan Vazov". Since 2014, Vladimir Karamazov is a regular ambassador of the "Theatre's Night", part of the "European Theatre Night" initiative.

In 2017, Vladimir Karamazov lectures in "Ideas Rearranged – StartUP Conference 2017", presenting the communication strategy of "Three Bears Entertainment" and some of the most successful and effective advertising campaigns and projects of their production company. Since the first edition in 2013 every year, Vladimir Karamazov is nominated for "Bachelor of the Year" – section "Show Business".

In 2019, Karamazov takes the path of a photographer. His photographs are featured on prestigious photography platforms and win awards.

Karamazov speaks Bulgarian, English, and Russian. His real name is Vladimir Aleksandrov. The artistic name Karamazov was assigned by the director Lilia Abadjieva for his part as Romeo. His hobbies and passions are traveling around the world, scuba diving and track motorcycles.

== Theater ==
Karamazov started his career as an actor in 2000 in the National Theater "Ivan Vazov" as Romeo in the play "Romeo and Juliet" by William Shakespeare, directed by Lilia Abadjieva. In 2006, "Romeo and Juliet" with Karamazov as Romeo is presented at Lit Moon Theatre in Santa Barbara, USA.

Karamazov continued his theater presence in the National Theater "Ivan Vazov" with performances in "The King Stag" by Carlo Gozzi and directed by Marius Kurkinski (2001), as Valentino in "Twelfth Night" by Shakespeare and directed by Robert Sturua (2001), as Ivan Senebirski in "Albena" by Yordan Yovkov and directed by Ivan Dobchev (2002), as Florizel in "The Winter's Tale" by Shakespeare and directed by Marius Kurkinski (2002), as Ferdinand in "The Tempest" by Shakespeare and directed by Alexander Morfov (2003), as Ross in "Macbeth" by Shakespeare and directed by Plamen Markov (2003), as Jeko Horov in "Careerists" by Ivan Vazov and directed by Ivan Dobchev (2004), in "The Outcasts" by Ivan Vazov and directed by Alexander Morfov (2004), as Desdemona in "Othello" by Shakespeare and directed by Lilia Abadjieva (2005), as Edmund in "King Lear" by Shakespeare and directed by Javor Gardev (2006), as Lord Goring in "An Ideal Husband" by Oscar Wilde and directed by Thierry Harcourt (2007), as Guido Wernig in "Bacchanalia" by Arthur Schnitzler and directed by Anton Ugrinov (2007), as Perdican in "No Trifling with Love" by Alfred de Musset and directed by Marius Kurkinski (2007), as Gustave in "Carnival of Thieves" by Jean Anouilh and directed by Thierry Harcourt (2008), as Florindo Aretusi in "Servant of Two Masters" by Carlo Goldoni and directed by Mitko Bozakov (2009), as Yasha in "The Cherry Orchard" by Anton Chekhov and directed by Krikor Azarian (2009).

His performances in other theaters include also the role of Michal in "Vernissage" by Václav Havel and directed by Anton Ugrinov, Satirical Theater "Aleko Konstantinov", and the role of The Fisherman in "The Fisherman and His Soul" by Oscar Wilde and directed by Marius Kurkinski, Theater 199, the role of Casanova in "Casanova – Requiem for Love" written and directed by Diana Dobreva, DT "Salza i smiah" (2009).

In 2010 and 2013, the play "Casanova – Requiem for Love" with Vladimir Karamazov as Giacomo Casanova gathers ovations in France – at the Avignon Theater Festival, France and in theaters in Paris. Karamazov’s acting talent is recognized there. In March and April 2013, "Casanova" guest-performs in Théâtre de l'Epée de Bois in Paris, France.

In the National Theater "Ivan Vazov" Vladimir Karamazov performs also as Christian in "Cyrano de Bergerac" by Edmond Rostand and directed by Tedi Moskov (2010), as Joseph Pitt in "Angels in America" by Tony Kushner and directed by Desislava Shpatova (2010), as Khlestakov in "The Government Inspector" by Nikolai Gogol and directed by Marius Kurkinski (2011).

Karamazov returns to Satirical Theater "Aleko Konstantinov" in 2012 in the role of Soap in "Spinach and Chips" by Zoltán Egressy and directed by Bogdan Petkanin.

After more than 10 years on stage playing in more than 25 theater plays and participations in television shows, films and TV series, in 2013, Karamazov together with his colleagues and best friends Zachary Baharov and Julian Vergov created the "Three Bears Entertainment" production company, which first project is the play "Art" by Yasmina Reza, co-production with the Satirical Theater "Aleko Konstantinov". Since its premiere in April 2013, the play tours all over the country.

In 2014 and 2016, Karamazov played The Scoundrel (Flynn) in "Tales for Symphonic Orchestra" by Fortissimo Familia in "Bulgaria" Hall, conductor Maxim Eshkenazy. In 2015, Karamazov participates in "Portrait of Tchaikovsky – Child of Glass" (as Tchaikovsky). In 2017, he participates in "The Carnival of the Animals" (as The African King) from the Fortissimo Familia program.

In 2014, you can see Vladimir Karamazov in the National Theater "Ivan Vazov" as the teacher Ivan Garvanov in the play "The Conspirators from Solun", written by Georgi Danailov and directed by Stoyan Radev.

In 2015, Karamazov returns to Satirical Theater "Aleko Konstantinov" with a production of his company Three Bears Entertainment of the play "Dakota", written by Jordi Galceran and directed by Vladimir Penev. He is the Hospital Attendant, the Policeman, the Crippled Soldier.

In 2016, Karamazov plays the character of Alain Reille in "God of Carnage", written by Yasmina Reza and directed by Anton Ugrinov in the National Theater "Ivan Vazov".

In 2017, Karamazov plays the character of Andrei in "Delhi Dance", written by Ivan Vyrypaev and directed by Galin Stoev in the National Theater "Ivan Vazov".

In 2018, Vladimir Karamazov plays the character of Shalimov in "Neo-Summerfolk", written by Maxim Gorky and directed by Ivan Panteleev in the National Theater "Ivan Vazov".

== Television ==
Karamazov appears for a first time in a TV series in 2002 in the Bulgarian adaptation of Un gars, une fille (She and He) (Season 1–4) on bTV (as Dany).

In 2006, he is the host of a tourist TV show "Without Luggage" on TV7.

From 2007 to 2021, Karamazov is the host of five seasons of the Bulgarian edition of Survivor BG on bTV – Survivor BG: Expedition Robinson, Survivor BG: Pearl Islands, Survivor Bulgaria 4, Survivor 5 – Cambodia and Survivor 6 – The Hidden Idol.

In 2013, he plays Panto Valchev in the TV series "The Tree of Life" (Season 1–2) on TV7. He also plays Stanimir Kisiov in the TV series "Fourth Power" (Season 1) on BNT 1.

In 2015, Vladimir Karamazov is the host of the television game "Bingo Millions"/"Lottery Bulgaria" on bTV.

In 2019, Karamazov plays the lead character Philip Chanov in the TV series "Devil's Throat" (Season 1) on NOVA TV.

From 2018 to 2020, Karamazov plays Hristo Karagyozov in the TV series "Stolen Life" (season 6–9) on NOVA TV.

In 2025, Karamazov became the host of the Bulgarian version of the Dutch reality game show Traitors: Igra na predateli (De Verraders).

== Films ==
In 2009, Karamazov gives his voice to Prince Naveen in the Bulgarian release of the animated movie "The Princess and The Frog".

In 2011, he was the voice to the Narrator in the Bulgarian release of the documentary movie "Hubble 3D".

In 2008, Karamazov was Vladimir in the movie "Naive", and in 2012, he was Germain in "I Am You".

In 2016, Karamazov gives his voice to Beetle in the Bulgarian release of the animated movie "Kubo and the Two Strings".

Karamazov plays in the short films "You Are It" (2007) and "Meat" (2010).

== Commercials ==
Karamazov appears in commercials of Nivea, Andrews Fashion, MTel, Nissan,Vicks, Gillette, Vodka Flirt, Coca Cola Light EGG.

== Initiatives and charity campaigns ==
Over the years, Karamazov is involved in many initiatives and charity campaigns - Bulgarian Christmas (of the President of Bulgaria), UNICEF ("Violence-Free Future for Every Child", "Together since Kindergarten", and others), Openly for Diabetis, Theaters Night, Fortissimo Family, Recreate Classics, The Poets (of Interview.to), Mission Maverick, Great Together, Wings for Life World Run, Better with Pets, Praktika.

== Awards and nominations ==
In 2003, Karamazov is nominated for "ASKEER award – Rising Star" for his role as Ivan Senebirski in "Albena" (National Theater "Ivan Vazov").

In 2011, he is nominated for "ASKEER award – Best Supporting Actor" and for "IKAR award" for his role as Christian in "Cyrano de Bergerac" (National Theater "Ivan Vazov").

In 2011, he received the award "Ivan Dimov" for high achievements in the arts, given by the Fund for Talented Young Actors at "Young Bulgarian Talents" Foundation.

In 2013, he received the diploma "Golden Century" for contribution to culture, awarded by the Ministry of Culture of Bulgaria.

In 2015 and 2016, Karamazov is in "Forbes Top 70 Bulgarian Celebrities" and in "TOP 50 Most Influential Bulgarians in Facebook"

In 2017, Karamazov is nominated for "ASKEER award – Best Leading Actor" for his role as Alain Reille in "God of Carnage" by Yasmina Reza (National Theater "Ivan Vazov").
