= Stefan Popov (actor) =

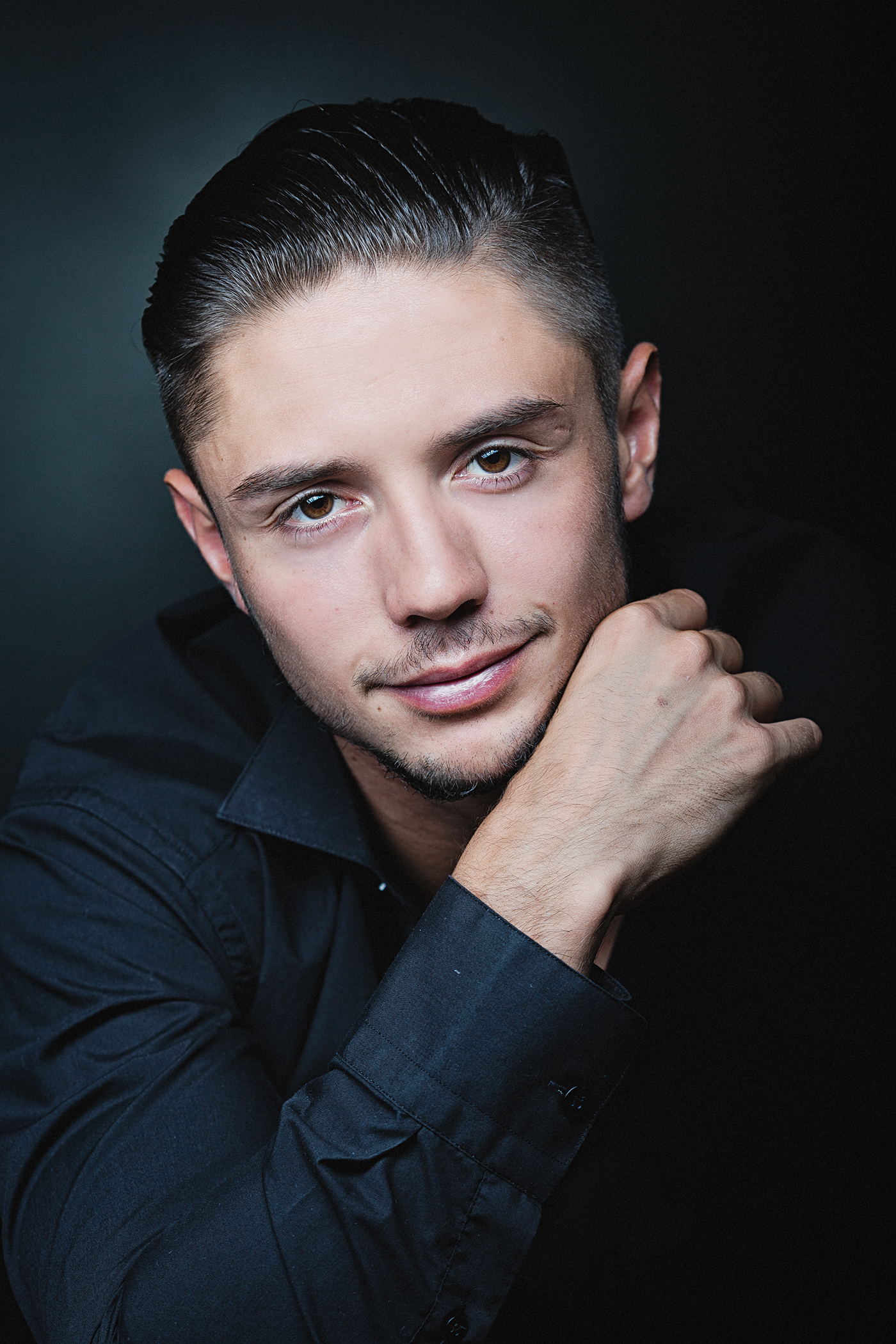
- Born: Stefan Vasilev Popov; 26 November 1993 (age 32); Targovishte, Bulgaria
- Occupation: Actor
- Years active: 2013 – present

Stefan Vasilev "Chefo" Popov (Bulgarian: Стефан Василев „Чефо“ Попов; born on 26 November 1993), is a Bulgarian actor and a YouTuber.

He is known for playing the role of Giogio in the Bulgarian drama film Bulgarian Rhapsody, which has been selected as the Bulgarian entry for the Best Foreign Language Film at the 87th Academy Awards.

== Filmography ==
Film
Year	Title	Role	Notes
2014	Bulgarian Rhapsody	Giogio	
2015	Solveig	The Soldier	
2015	Shooting Star	Martin	
