= Hills of Rock (music festival) =

Bulgarian music festival

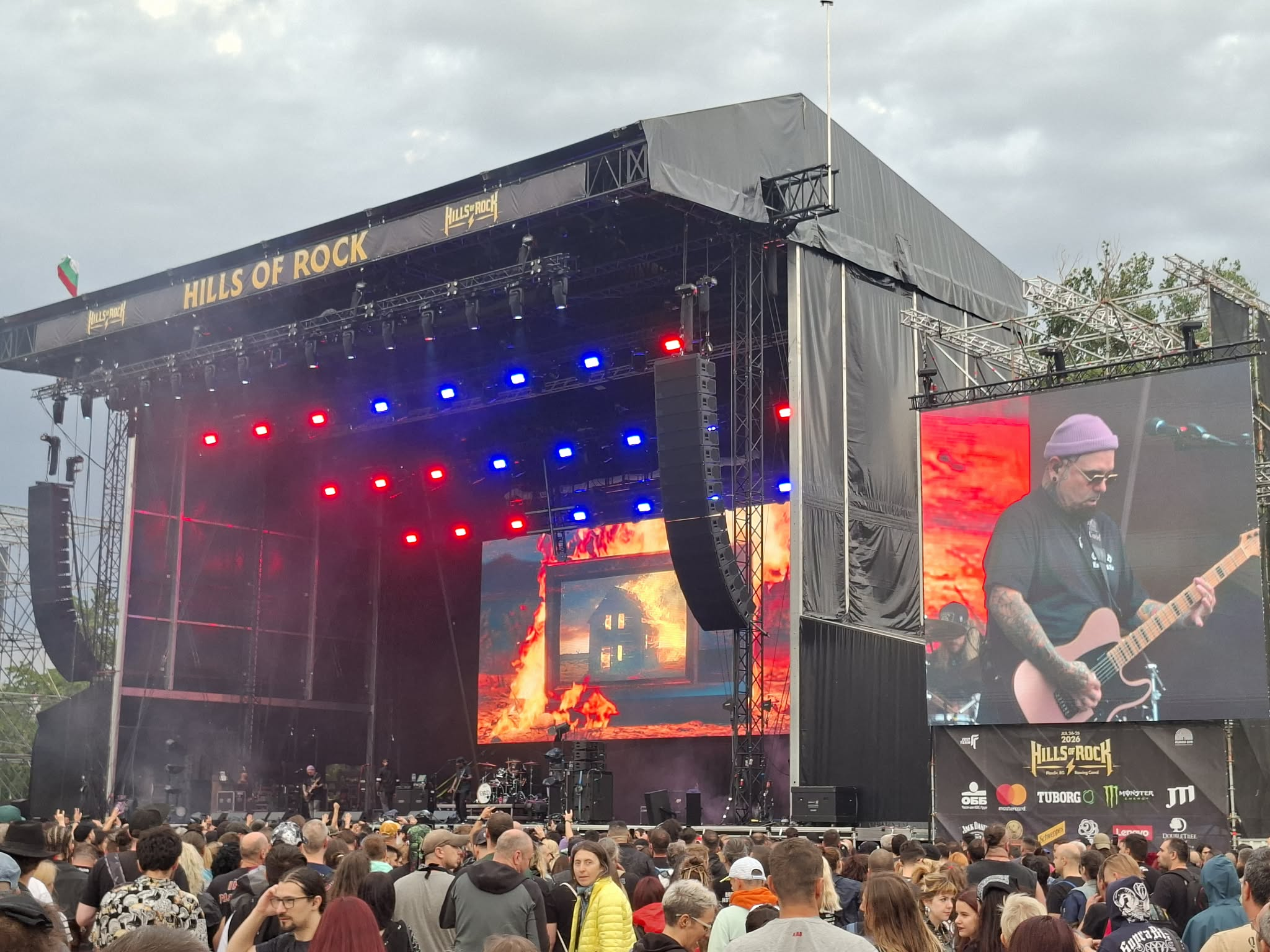
- P.O.D. performing at Hills of Rock, 2026
- Dates: 30/06-01/07/2017; 20-22/07/2018; 28-30/06/2019; 21-23/07/2022; 25-27/07/2024; 25-27/07/2025; 23-26/07/2026
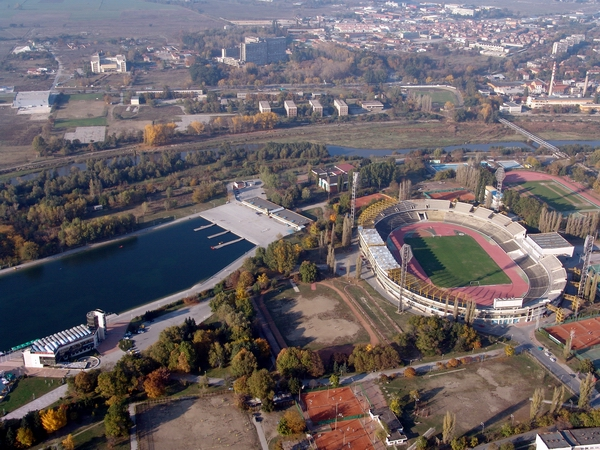
- Venue: Rowing Canal, Plovdiv Aerial view of the Rowing Canal and the Plovdiv Stadium, 2007
- Country: Bulgaria
- Years active: 2017-2019, 2022, 2024-present
- Next event: Hills of Rock 2027

Hills of Rock is the largest annual music festival in Bulgaria, focusing on rock and metal music. First launched in 2017, the multi-day event takes place every summer at the Rowing Canal in Plovdiv, drawing tens of thousands of international and local music fans.More than 150 foreign and Bulgarian bands have performed in the three festival stages since 2017.

== History ==
Hills of Rock was founded in 2017 as a strategic project integrated into the "Plovdiv 2019 – European Capital of Culture" framework. Organized initially in partnership with Sofia Music Enterprises, the festival aimed to establish Bulgaria as a major stop for touring international rock and metal acts. That same year, the festival became one of Bulgaria's biggest music events. It attracted thousands of visitors, who enjoyed the performances of 32 bands and artists – world stars, hot names from the neighbouring Balkan states, as well as some of Bulgaria’s best bands. Headliners were Epica, Evanescence, Three Days Grace and Guano Apes.

The festival spans across three separate stages, showcasing over 30 international and local bands each year.

Rob Halford of Judas Priest at Hills Of Rock, 2018

The headlining bands of the 2018 festival were Sabaton, Judas Priest and Iron Maiden. The headlining bands of the 2019 festival were Disturbed, Whitesnake and Garbage. The new Music Jam Stage was also introduced in 2019.

Iron Maiden's mascot, Eddie, photographed live at Hills of Rock, 2018

In both 2020 and 2021, the festival was canceled due to the COVID-19 pandemic.

In 2022, the festival returned for its fourth edition. Slipknot, Mercyful Fate and Sabaton were the headliners for that year.

Also in 2022, a second, 2 day festival was organized at the Sofia Airport Park in Sofia, Bulgaria. It was headlined by Placebo and Five Finger Death Punch. The event also featured a dedicated electronic music experience, with the ''Hills of Bass'' serving as the finale to each festival day.

Following an organizational pause in 2023, the 2024 headliners were Bring Me The Horizon, KoЯn and Amon Amarth. This year, the festival was attended by over 60,000 fans, who enjoyed the performance of over 50 bands. Fans also got to experience the brand-new ''Stroeja'' Stage.Additionally, for the first time, a special ground cover was installed in front of the main stage to reduce dust and protect the grass areas. The renowned choir The Mystery of the Bulgarian Voices made a special guest appearance to perform the ''Ergen Deda'' intro live during Bring Me The Horizon's performance of ''Parasite Eve''.

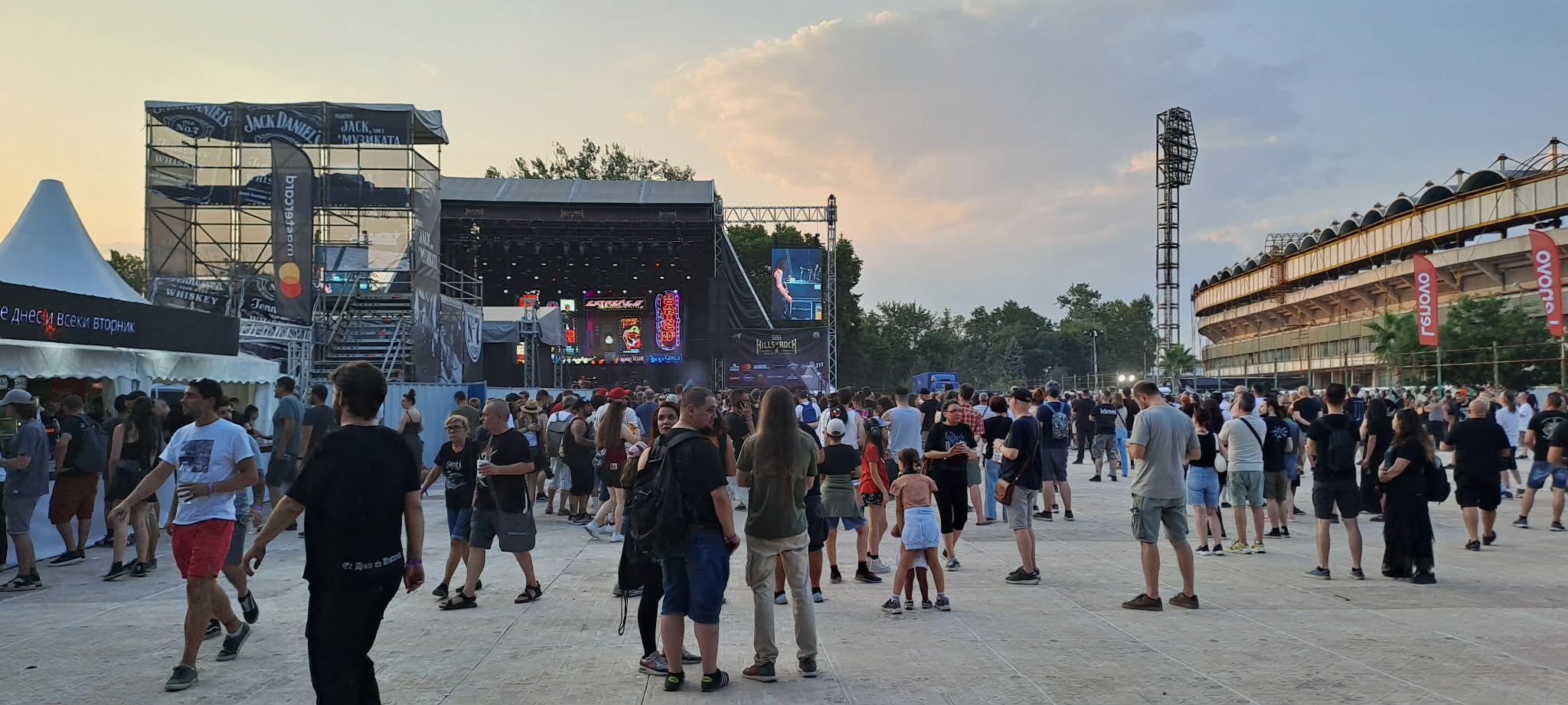
Hills of Rock, 2025

The headlining bands of the 2025 festival were Gojira, Machine Head and The Smashing Pumpkins.The French metalcore band Landmvrks was originally scheduled to perform on the festival's first day, but they canceled their set just nine days before the event.

Marilyn Manson, Godsmack and Electric Callboy headlined the 2026 festival. This year introduced an independent, single-day precursor event called ''BE4 HILLS'', and it was kicked off by the local heavy metal band SEVI.The organizers of the event moved the primary gates to Koprivshtitsa Blvd.

Slash feat. Myles Kennedy and The Conspirators, Skillet, Make Them Suffer, Left To Suffer, Die Krupps and Atreyu are the first six bands who are confirmed to take part in the 2027 edition of the festival.

== Stages and Notable Artists ==
=== Main Stage (2017-2019, 2022, 2024-present) ===
Skindred performing on the Main Stage at Hills of Rock, 2026

The Main Stage of Hills of Rock serves as the festival's center stage. During the years, many artists have performed at the Main Stage including Evanescence (2017), Three Days Grace (2017), Epica (2017, 2026), Iron Maiden (2018), Judas Priest (2018), Sabaton (2018, 2022, 2026), Disturbed (2019), Gojira (2025), Skindred (2024, 2026), and Marilyn Manson (2026).

=== Na Tamno Stage (2017-2019, 2022, 2024-present) ===
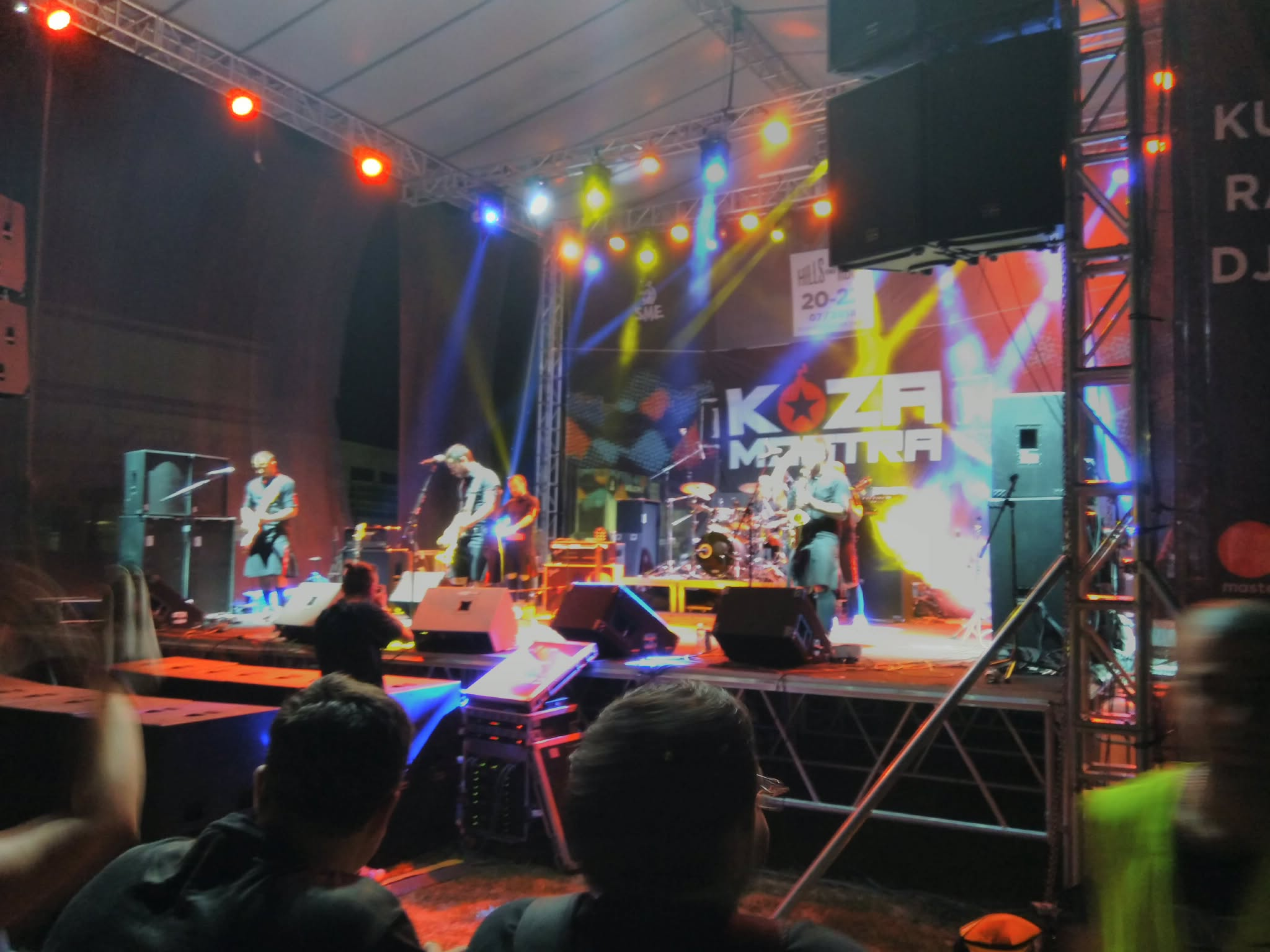
Koza Mostra performing on the Na Tamno Stage at Hills of Rock, 2018

The Na Tamno Stage is the second stage to be apart of every festival edition so far. Na Tamno is an well-known, long-running Bulgarian alternative streetwear and subculture brand. Because of its deep roots in the local rock, punk, and metal scenes, the brand acts as a major partner and sponsor for Hills of Rock. Many alternative, primarely native or lesser known international acts, have performed on the stage. Some examples being SEVI, Odd Crew, Koza Mostra, Dub Pistols, Milena Slavova, P.I.F. and more.In 2026, the Serbian progressive metal band Lavina were scheduled to perform on the Na Tamno Stage, but cancelled their show less than a week before the festival started. The Bulgarian rock band Blinded Through the Seasons took their place on the stage instead.

=== World Stage (2017) ===
The World Stage was part of the first edition of the festival, it included acts like Shazalakazoo, Bobo & The Gang, Kontrol, Folk&Roll, Conquering Lion and others.

=== Alternative Hill Stage (2018) ===
In 2018, the Alternative Hill Stage replaced the World Stage from 2017, and it introduced an electronic music only event after midnight. Artists include Reaven, Cold Snap, Goldie, High Contrast Dynamite MC, R33 and more.

=== Music Jam Stage (2019, 2022) ===
The Music Jam Stage was part of the 2019 and 2022 festivals. Artists like Dreamshade, Visions of Atlantis, Voice of Ruin, SEVI, Ravenface, 5RAND, Fallcie and others have performed on the stage.

=== Stroeja Stage (2024-2025) ===
Club Stroeja is one of the oldest running clubs in Bulgaria, founded March 1997. In 2024, they partnered with Hills of Rock and hosted the Stroeja Stage, which replaced the Music Jam Stage, and debuted with acts like Zhluch/Grigovor/Gena, No More Many More, Panican Whyasker and Joker Out.

In 2025, the stage returned and hosted the performances of Dope, Kultur Shock, Attaxic, Cool Den and others.

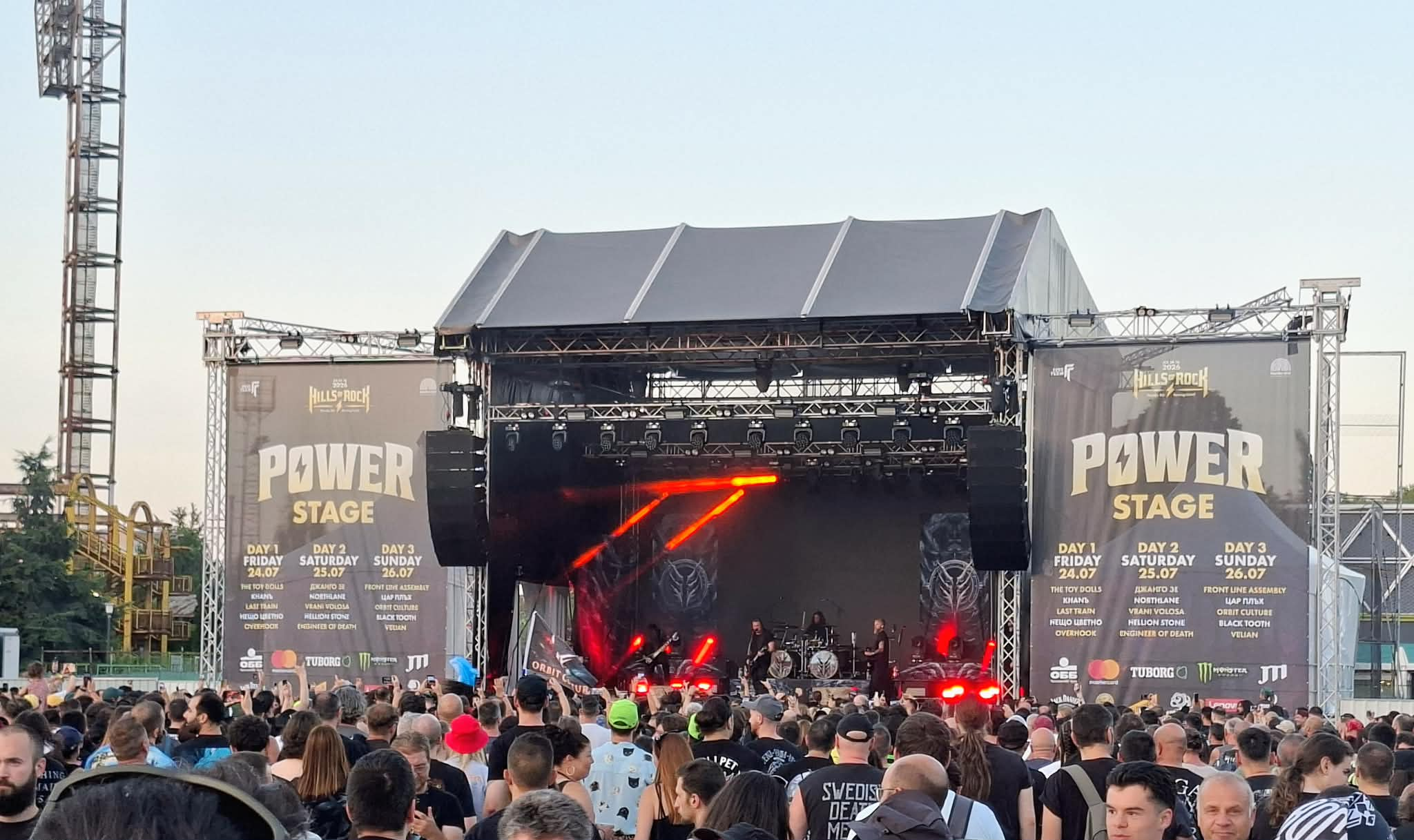
Orbit Culture performing on the Power Stage at Hills of Rock, 2026

=== Power Stage (2026-present) ===
In 2026, the Power Stage replaced the Stroeja Stage. Artists so far include Orbit Culture, Velian, Vrani Volosa, Front Line Assembly, The Toy Dolls and more.
