= Sevis =

Sevis or SEVIS may refer to:

- Student and Exchange Visitor Program (SEVIS), of the United States Immigration and Customs Enforcement (ICE)

== Places ==
- Sevis, Iran, a village in Fars Province
- Ševiš, southern Serbia, a village
- Sévis, Seine-Maritime department, France, a commune
- Seewis im Prättigau, a municipality in Switzerland

== See also ==
- Sevi (disambiguation)
