= The Other Side of Sevi =

The Other Side Of Sevi

Studio album by Sevi
- Released: February 13, 2013
- Recorded: November 30, 2012
- Genre: Alternative rock, rock, hard rock, heartland rock
- Length: 31:31
- Label: Indie
- Producer: Sevi

Sevi chronology
What Lies Beyond (2012)	The Other Side Of Sevi (2013)

The Other Side Of Sevi is the first acoustic album of the Bulgarian rock band Sevi, which was recorded live on November 30, 2012 and released on February 13, 2013. The band made the concert as a part of the music video promo of their third single Victim.

== Background ==
The album consist of 9 tracks, which are rearranged acoustic versions of some of the songs of Sevi's debut album What Lies Beyond, also two other songs, You Don't Love Me, which was one of the first songs of Sevi, but they never recorded it, and the other – On My Own, which Svetlana "Sevi" Bliznakova co-wrote with Pino Biaggioli and recorded with the Italian rock band "Eldritch". It was also the first live performance of the song Into You. Sevi made some experimental arrangements of the songs in order to make them different enough from the studio versions, along with the idea of keeping the emotion and the meaning of the songs. The genre varies from swing and blue grass to cabaret, which gives completely new sounding of Sevi's music, so that's why it is called The Other Side Of Sevi.

== Track list ==
1. "Into You"
2. "On My Own"
3. "Limited Edition"
4. "Hot"
5. "You Don't Love Me"
6. "Run Away"
7. "Speed Up"
8. "If I'm Made For Lovin' You"
9. "Victim"
