= Can't Stand the Pain =

Single by Sevi

from the album What Lies Beyond
- Released: June 24, 2011
- Recorded: 2010
- Genre: Alternative rock, rock, hard rock, heartland rock
- Length: 3:33
- Label: Indie
- Songwriter: Svetlana “Sevi” Bliznakova
- Producer: Sevi

Sevi singles chronology
"Can't Stand the Pain" (2011)	"Limited Edition" (2011)

"Can’t Stand the Pain" is a song by the Bulgarian rock band “Sevi” and it was the first official single with featured video of Sevi band. Written by Svetlana “Sevi” Bliznakova in her early years of composing, the song was originally recorded as a collaboration between Sevi and Peter Bratanov. He was former guitarist of the alternative rock band "Awake" and year later, became a member of the band Sevi and the song was recorded as an official debut single and video of the band. “Can’t Stand The Pain” turned out to be a very successful choice for Sevi. It was liked by the Bulgarian fans of the band, and also it brought Sevi an international success. Thanks to this song, they were chosen for "Band of the week" in Lima (Peru).

== Background ==
The music video of "Can't Stand the Pain" was directed by Vladimir Andonov and Dimitar Karakashev, shot by Jean Trendafilov, and it was the first video to be presented on cinema in Bulgaria. The basic conception of the clip is about the disappointments in life, caused by higher expectations in childhood. The idea is presented by a little girl with her toys, metaphorically describing desires and situations, which have their real life equivalents in the video, but with different, unexpected and disappointing denouements.
