= Sevi =

Sevi may refer to:

- Sibi, a town in Balochistan, Pakistan
- Sevi (crater), a crater on Mars
- Sevi (band), a Bulgarian rock band
- Sevi (singer) (born 1983), Bulgarian singer
- Merve Sevi (born 1987), Turkish actress
- Sevi Holmsten (1921–1993), Finnish rower
