= Limited Edition (song) =

Single by Sevi

from the album What Lies Beyond
- Released: November 11, 2011
- Recorded: 2011
- Genre: Alternative rock, rock, hard rock, heartland rock
- Length: 3:08
- Label: Indie
- Songwriter(s): Svetlana “Sevi” Bliznakova, Rally Velinov
- Producer(s): Sevi

Sevi singles chronology
"Limited Edition" (2011)	"Victim" (2012)

Limited Edition is a song by the Bulgarian rock band “Sevi” and it was the second official single with featured video of Sevi band. The song was written by Svetlana Bliznakova and Rally Velinov in 2010 and was later recorded with the band Sevi and also became part of their debut album What Lies Beyond. The song entered the rock radio charts and stayed more than 46 weeks in the top 10 of Kamenitza Rock 40 music chart on Z-Rock Radio.

== Background ==
The idea of the song was to reflect to all people who feel they are limited edition, unique individuals. In a deeper level, it speaks to all women, who feel they are limited edition, one of a kind and hard to find. This conception is also expressed in the video of the song (directed by Boyan Karamfilov) by Sevi herself and the keyboard player Tania Apostolova. They were presented like some kind of aliens or other strange unique creatures to strengthen the impression of the limited edition.
