= Nija =

Studio album by Orbit Culture
- Released: 7 August 2020
- Genre: Thrash metal; groove metal; melodic death metal; progressive metal
- Length: 45:27
- Label: Seek & Strike
- Producer: Niklas Karlsson

Orbit Culture chronology
Rasen (2016)	Nija (2020)	Descent (2023)

Singles from Nija
- 1. "Nensha" Released: September 2019; 2. "Rebirth" Released: February 2020; 3. "The Shadowing" Released: 27 March 2020; 4. "Open Eye" Released: 2 July 2020; 5. "Mute the Silent" Released: 14 January 2021

Professional ratings
Review scores
Source	Rating
Blabbermouth.net	8/10
Distorted Sound	9/10
Metal1.info	9/10
Sonic Perspectives	8/10

Nija is the third studio album by Swedish melodic death metal band Orbit Culture. It was released on 7 August 2020, via Seek & Strike Records in LP, CD and digital formats.

== Background and promotion ==
In September 2019, the band released the single "Nensha". In February 2020, they released another single along with a music video for the song "Rebirth." That March, they released the single "The Shadowing" which finalized what was three-song trilogy. Another single was released for the song "Open Eye" in July 2020.

Orbit Culture performed a live-stream show for the album at Knotfest "Pulse of the Maggots Live Streaming Festival" in November 2020. Karlsson has stated his interests in Metallica, Gojira, and Behemoth helped inspire him. He also said of Nija: "this album has been the hardest and most difficult set of songs I've ever worked with."

The deluxe edition of the album was released in January 2021 and includes the bonus track "Mute the Silent".

== Track listing ==
All tracks are written by Niklas Karlsson.

Nija track listing
No.	Title	Length
1.	"At the Front"	3:09
2.	"North Star of Nija"	5:15
3.	"Day of the Cloud"	4:58
4.	"Behold"	5:14
5.	"Open Eye"	4:38
6.	"Mirrorslave"	4:59
7.	"Nensha"	5:44
8.	"Rebirth"	5:48
9.	"The Shadowing"	4:26
10.	"Set Us Free"	1:16
Total length:		45:27

CD edition bonus track
No.	Title	Length
11.	"Wargblod"	5:18
Total length:		50:45

Deluxe edition bonus track
No.	Title	Length
12.	"Mute the Silent"	4:52
Total length:		55:37

== Personnel ==
=== Orbit Culture ===
- Niklas Karlsson – lead vocals, rhythm guitar, production, mixing, mastering, engineering
- Richard Hansson – lead guitar
- Fredrik Lennartsson – bass guitar
- Christopher Wallerstedt – drums

=== Additional contributor ===
- Bahrull Marta – artwork
