= What Lies Beyond =

Studio album by Sevi
- Released: June 14, 2012
- Recorded: October 2010 – June 2012
- Genres: Alternative rock, rock, hard rock, heartland rock
- Length: 37:33
- Label: Indie
- Producer: Sevi

Sevi chronology
| What Lies Beyond (2012) | The Other Side of Sevi (2013) |

Singles from What Lies Beyond
- 1. "Can't Stand the Pain" Released: June 24, 2011; 2. "Limited Edition" Released: November 11, 2011; 3. "Victim" Released: November 30, 2012

What Lies Beyond is the debut album of the Bulgarian rock band Sevi, which was released on June 14, 2012. There were totally three singles to the album, along with music videos, as the first two ("Can't Stand the Pain" and "Limited Edition") were released before the album, and the third one, called "Victim" came few months after the studio album.

== Background ==
The album consist of 11 tracks, which are recorded in the period of 2010–2012. The pieces are a little bit different in genre, which gives Sevi somewhat interesting and diverse sounding and style, which they call heart rock. All of the songs in the album are written by Svetlana "Sevi" Bliznakova and Rally Velinov, separately or together, and later arranged by the whole band. The last song of the album, called "Into You" is some kind of a bonus track, written, played and recorded by Svetlana "Sevi" Bliznakova and appeared unplanned in the album. During the active period of the band until the release of "What Lies Beyond", there were two guitar players – Peter Bratanov and Ivan Angelov. Their appearance in Sevi, along with the different music tastes of all the members in the band, helps for the creation of motley, rich and colorful compositions, which leads to the essence of Sevi's typical style.

== Track list ==
1. "Fairy"
2. "Can't Stand The Pain"
3. "Limited Edition"
4. "Hot"
5. "Run Away"
6. "Speed Up"
7. "Pleased To Meet You"
8. "If I'm Made For Lovin' You"
9. "The Love We Shared Tonight"
10. "Victim"
11. "Into You"
