= Orbit Culture =

Swedish melodic death metal band

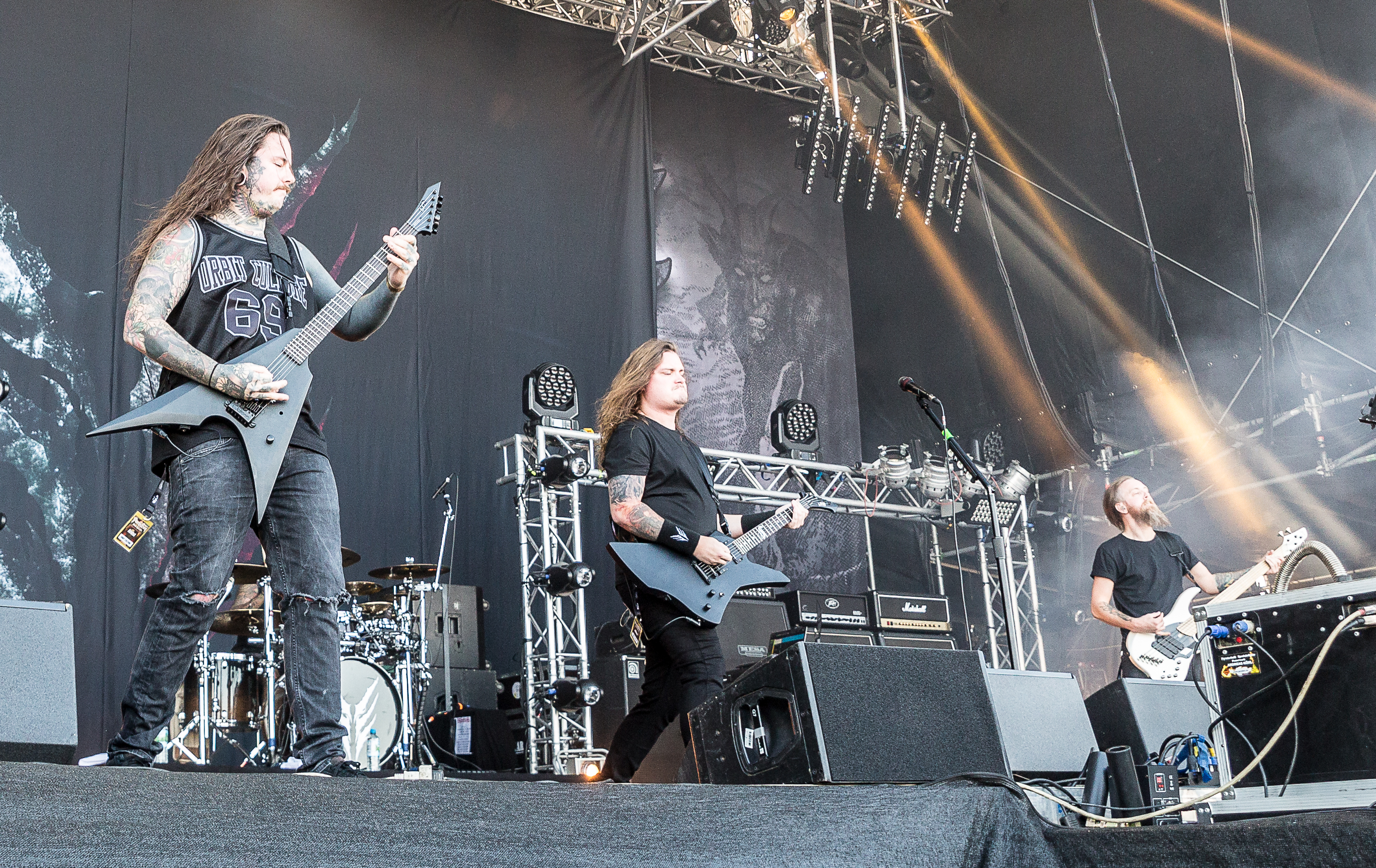
- Orbit Culture performing in 2023

Background information
- Origin: Eksjö, Sweden
- Genres: Melodic death metal; groove metal
- Years active: 2013–present
- Labels: Century Media; Seek & Strike
- Members: Niklas Karlsson; Richard Hansson; Fredrik Lennartsson; Christopher Wallerstedt
- Past members: Christoffer Olsson; Maximilian Zinsmeister; Markus Bladh
- Website: orbitculture.com

Orbit Culture is a Swedish melodic death metal band from Eksjö, formed in 2013. The band includes vocalist and rhythm guitarist Niklas Karlsson, lead guitarist Richard Hansson, bassist Fredrik Lennartsson, and drummer Christopher Wallerstedt. Former members include lead guitarist Maximilian Zinsmeister, bassist Christoffer Olsson and drummer Markus Bladh. The band has released five studio albums and four EPs.

== History ==
=== Formation, Odyssey, and In Medias Res (2013–2015) ===
Orbit Culture was formed by vocalist and rhythm guitarist Niklas Karlsson and ex-guitarist Maximilian Zinsmeister. They met each other through mutual friends at the age of 17 and decided to create a small group, renting a small rehearsal space in an old former power plant station. At that time Maximilian was playing with another local band called Abstract Noise, and he recruited fellow drummer Markus Bladh. Christoffer Olsson joined later to play bass guitar.

Shortly after their formation, Karlsson started to write songs for their debut EP and the band spent most of the summer of 2013 recording, mixing, and producing their first set of songs. The production ended in August 2013 and Odyssey was released shortly after. In December of that year, the band released the remastered version of the EP with new artwork and instrumental versions of the songs. Both Odyssey and the band gained local interest, leading to performing their first shows in their hometown.

After positive feedback towards Odyssey, the band started production on their first full-length album and released In Medias Res on 23 July 2014. A music video for the song "Obscurity" was released in October of the same year.

=== Rasen and lineup changes (2016–2017) ===
After promoting In Medias Res through multiple live shows, Zinsmeister decided to leave the band shortly after to focus on his academic studies. The band teased images and videos on social media of them working on a second full-length album. On 11 March 2016, their second full-length album Rasen was released. In August 2016 the band released the music video for their song "Sun of All," which reached over 1 million views on YouTube. Karlsson commented that things started to heat up in the underground metal community for them after this video.

Olsson decided to leave the band in the late summer of 2016, also on account of academic studies. Orbit Culture was then joined by two new members: Fredrik Lennartsson on bass guitar, and Richard Hansson (Bash Brothers, Straight A's) on lead guitar.

=== Redfog, Markus's departure and replacement, and first tour (2018–2019) ===
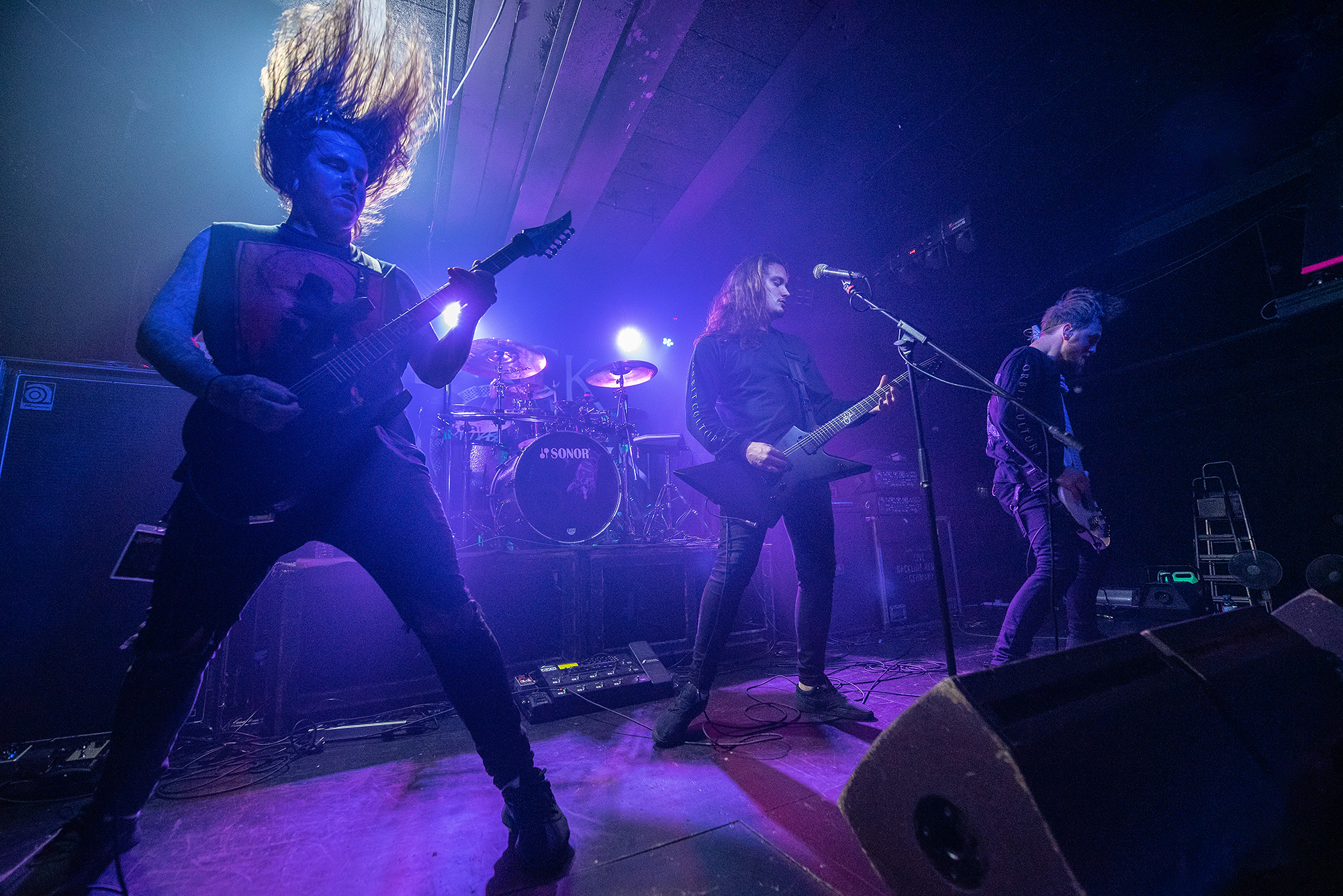
Orbit Culture performing in 2019

On 8 March 2018, Orbit Culture released the single "Saw." Karlsson revealed plans for a new EP titled Redfog. Redfog was released on 6 April 2018, following two additional singles, "See Through Me" and "Redfog." All three songs were commercial successes, indicated by over a million listens each on multiple streaming platforms that year. In 2019, Karlsson revealed they were writing a studio album under Seek & Strike Records.

On 11 March 2019, Orbit Culture announced that Markus Bladh felt that the time and effort the band needed was too much for him and that he had decided to part ways. Shortly after, they introduced Christopher Wallerstedt, a friend of Hansson, as their new drummer.

In 2019, the band's then-booking agent Avocado Booking set up their first tour with Rivers of Nihil, Black Crown Initiate, and MØL. Orbit Culture played their first-ever show outside Sweden at Cassiopeia, Berlin on the Rivers of Nihil Tour on 20 September 2019.

=== Nija and Shaman (2020–2022) ===
The same day as their first live tour performance, the band released the single "Nensha" through Seek & Strike Records. In February 2020 they released another single along with a music video for the song "Rebirth." That March, they released the single "The Shadowing" which finalized what was a three-song trilogy. The album Nija released on 7 August 2020 and received multiple positive reviews. Of the album, Karlsson commented, "You can expect a fist on your skull that forces you to the ground and exhausts you to ask for more." Orbit Culture performed a live-stream show for the album at Knotfest "Pulse of the Maggots Live Streaming Festival" in November 2020. Karlsson has stated his interests in Metallica, Gojira, and Behemoth helped inspire him. He also said of Nija: "this album has been the hardest and most difficult set of songs I've ever worked with."

The deluxe edition of the album was released in January 2021 and included two bonus tracks.

On 24 September 2021, the band released their third EP, Shaman. Karlsson stated that the song "A Sailor's Tale" was inspired by "Master of Puppets."

=== Descent and The Forgotten, and Century Media Records (2023–2024) ===
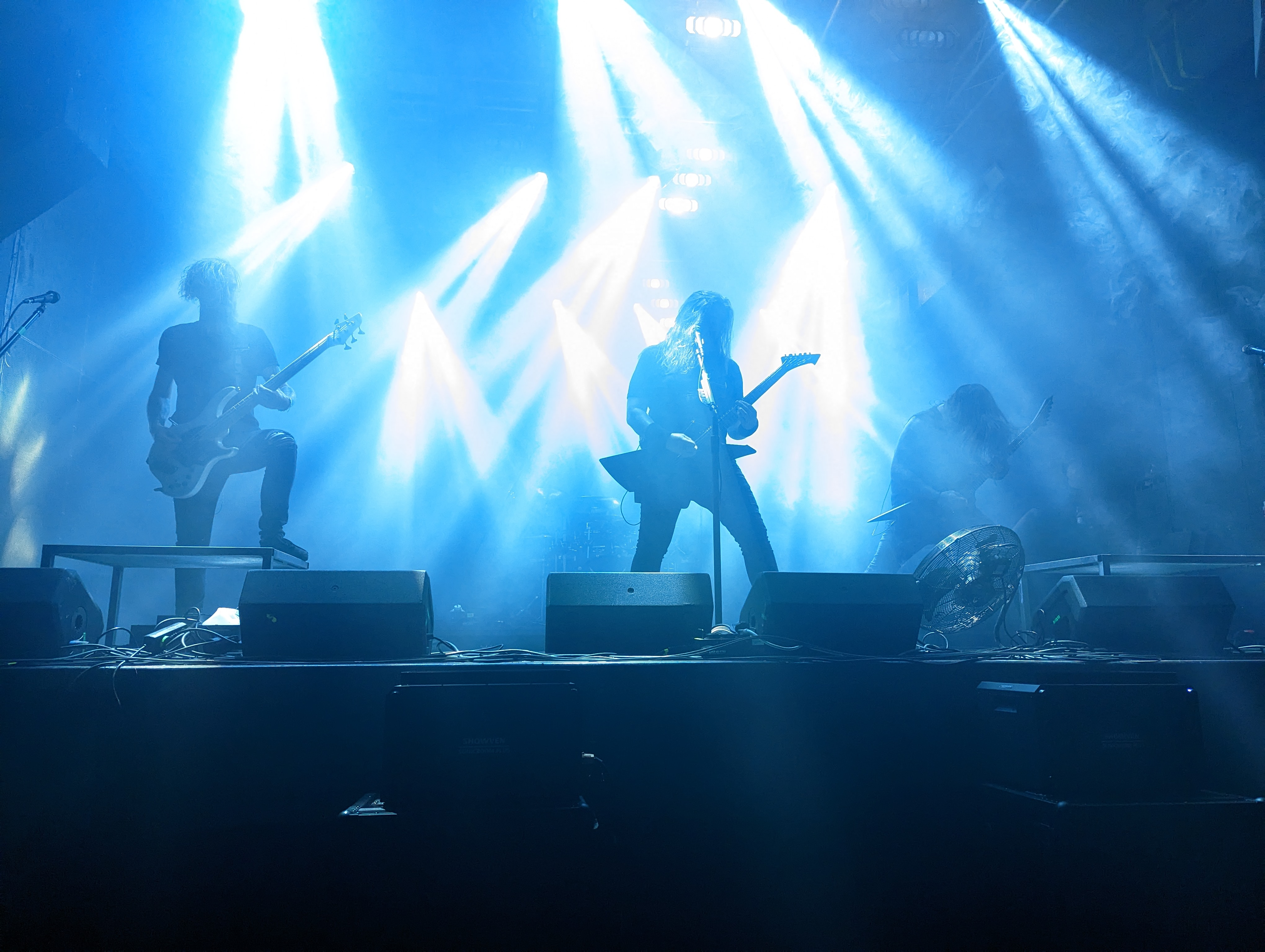
Orbit Culture performing at Mystic Festival 2023 in Gdansk, Poland (June 2023)

On 18 August 2023, the band released their fourth studio album, Descent, which Karlsson stated was meant to be "a live-friendly album, but in the end it turned out to be this big-ass darker monster," referring to its balance of light and dark elements. "That's what we're pushing for: the highest mountain to the lowest abyss." The album was well-received by critics and audiences, receiving praise and favorable ratings from reviewers including Revolver, Metal Hammer, and Chaoszine. Music videos for both singles "From The Inside" and "Vultures of North" debuted under the Seek & Strike label, with a visualizer music video for "Black Mountain" self-released by the band in January 2024.

On 1 December 2023, the band followed up Descent with a three-song EP titled The Forgotten, which included two tracks that didn't make the final cut for Descent ("The Upheaval" and "Sound of the Bell") as well as the newly-written song "While We Serve," which the band wrote immediately following their 2023 tour with Avatar while returning to Sweden. Karlsson stated that the EP was a thank-you to their fans for support during the last few years, saying "They are the most dedicated and supportive group of people I've ever seen, and everyone is so lovely and polite. We wouldn't be here without them and this EP is for them."

Following the release of The Forgotten in December 2023, Orbit Culture announced on social media that they had fulfilled their contractual obligations with Seek & Strike Records and would not be working with the label on future projects. On 18 January 2024, the band announced they had signed a deal with Century Media Records. Century Media Vice President Philipp Schulte said via press release, "Watching Orbit Culture's rise to becoming one of the greatest new metal bands in the world and now working with them is inspiring. I've personally been a fan since the beginning. They are part of both metal and Century Media's future in a very exciting way."

=== Death Above Life (2025–present) ===
On 28 April 2025, Orbit Culture removed all posts from their official Instagram account and replaced them with a single post of a completely solid black image with the cryptic caption, "20 8 5 20 1 12 5 19 15 6 23 1 18" which users quickly found to be a simple alphabetic cipher for "THE TALES OF WAR." The music video for The Tales of War, the first single from the upcoming album and the first under Century Media, was released on 7 May. The title track, Hydra, Nerve and Bloodhound were also released as singles leading up to the album's release.

The band's fifth studio album, Death Above Life, released in October 2025. Karlsson revealed the album was mixed by Buster Odeholm, a Swedish producer, mixing engineer, and founder and member of Humanity's Last Breath. The album marks the first release by the band not mixed by Karlsson himself.

== Tours ==
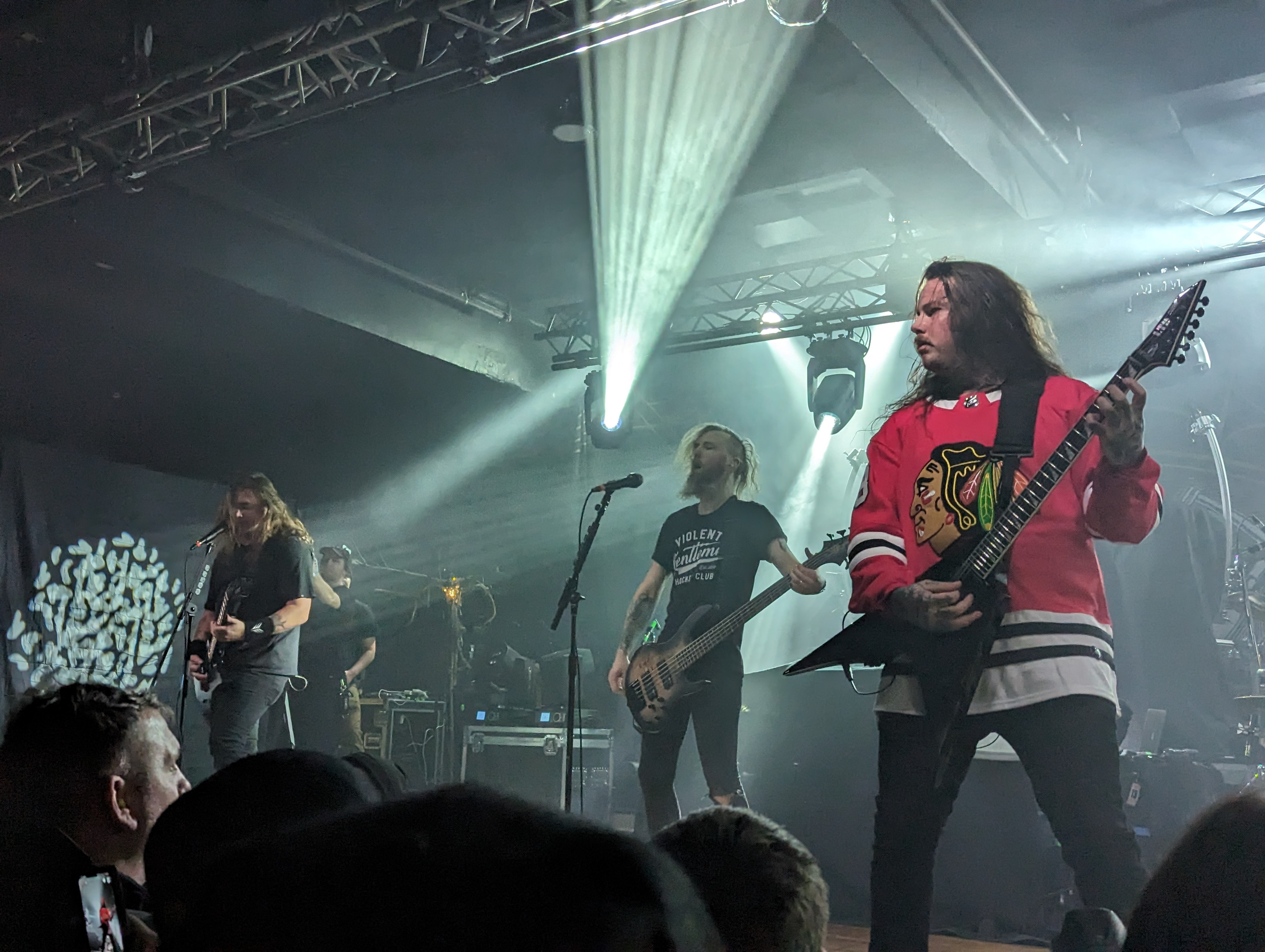
Orbit Culture performing at Concord Music Hall in Chicago, Illinois during the "Slaughter The Martøur" tour (January 2024)

The band was forced to cancel all of their shows in 2020 due to the pandemic of COVID-19, but joined Thy Art Is Murder, MALEVOLENCE, KING 810, and Alpha Wolf for an EU/UK at the end of 2021. They were also set to play at John Smith Rock Festival in July 2021, which was also later canceled due to the pandemic. Karlsson had an interview with Dead Press about his and the band's future plans. He mentioned he already had around 40 song ideas and that the band is working on new material. On 27 September 2021, the band announced that the United Talent Agency is now their booking agency worldwide.In 2022, Orbit Culture joined In Flames for fifteen shows during Orbit Culture's first U.S. tour, which led to the band also joining In Flames' European tour later that year.

On 19 January 2024, the band joined Machine Head on their "SLAUGHTER THE MARTØUR" world tour with a total of 29 concerts in the U.S. and Canada. This first North America leg features Fear Factory, Orbit Culture, and Gates to Hell as support bands.

Following the release of The Forgotten EP, the band announced their first ever EU/UK headline tour, "Descending Into Madness Tour 2024", with the bands Bite Down and Defects as openers.

In April 2024, Slipknot announced that Orbit Culture would be joining Knocked Loose and Vended as opening bands on their "Here Comes the Pain" tour to celebrate the 25th anniversary of their self-titled debut album. Orbit Culture announced on social media in May 2024 that they would be adding additional headlining stops in North America between show dates. The tour featured the band's first-ever appearances in South America, as well as their first Latin America headline show in Mexico City.

Orbit Culture joined Bullet for My Valentine and Trivium as a special guest on their "The Poisoned Ascendancy Tour" in celebration of the anniversaries of Bullet for My Valentine's The Poison and Trivium's Ascendancy albums.

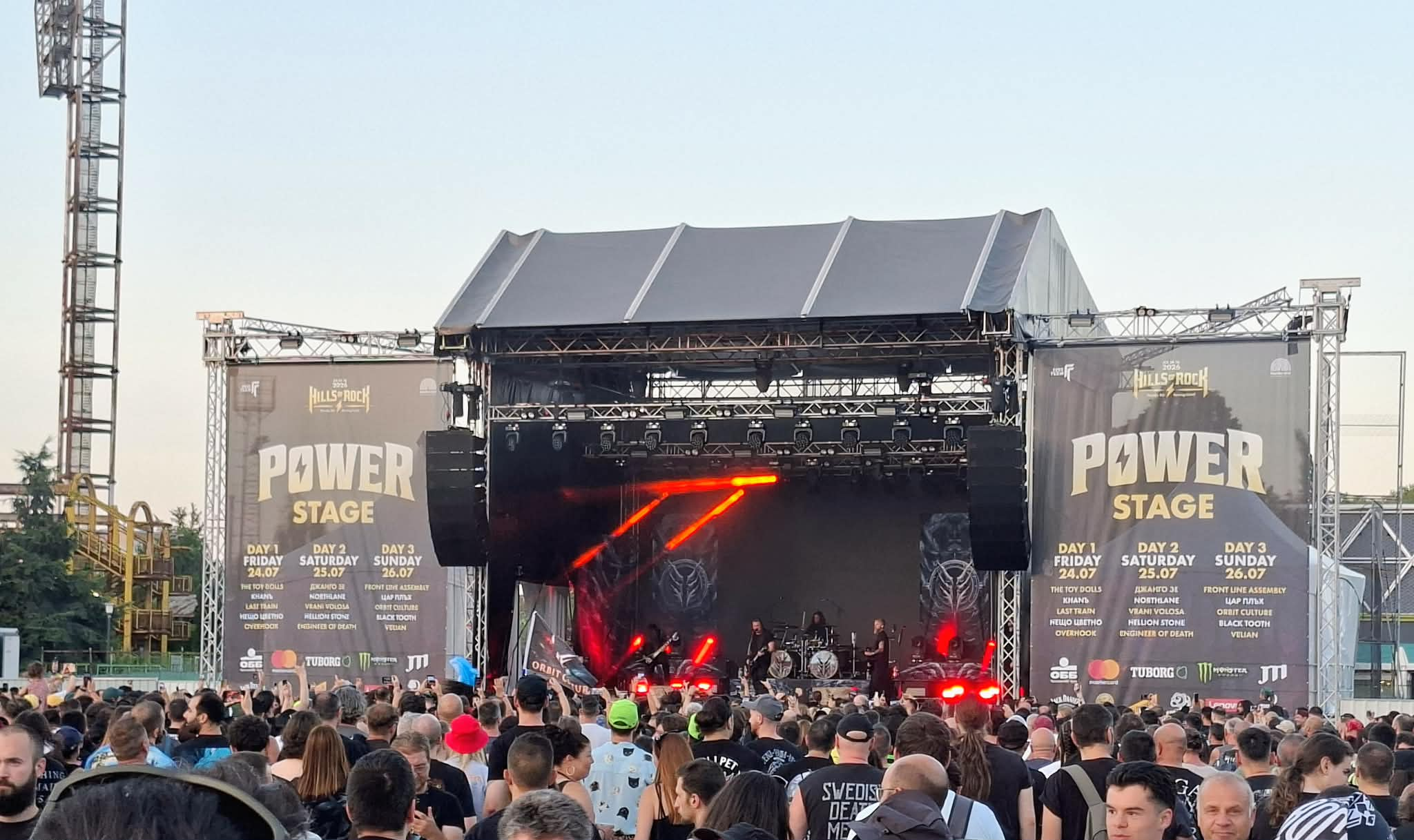
Orbit Culture performing on Hills of Rock 2026 in Plovdiv, Bulgaria (July 2026)

In 2025, the band played several festival appearances including Graspop Metal Meeting, Download Festival, Tons of Rock (Norway), and Tuska Open Air Metal Festival.

The "Death Above Life" tour was announced in June 2025 for Europe and the United Kingdom, with special guests Gaerea and supporting act Atlas. The tour was later announced for North America having dates in March and April 2026, with special guests Ov Sulfur and Atlas continuing to support. In 2026, the band also played several festival appearances including Hills of Rock (Bulgaria), Wacken Open Air (Germany), Bloodstock Open Air (UK), Summer Breeze Open Air (Germany) and Pol'and'Rock Festival (Poland).

== Band members ==
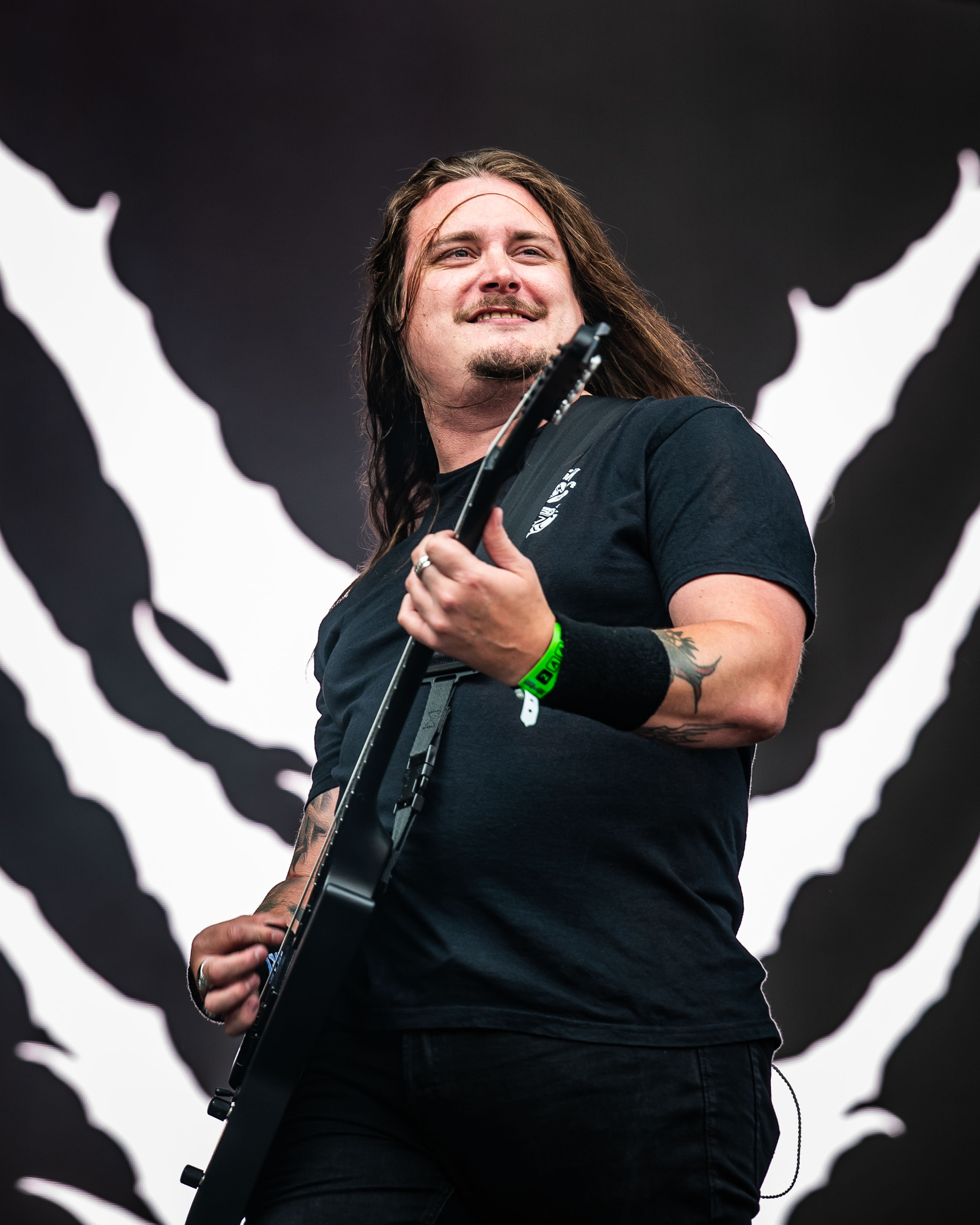
Niklas Karlsson

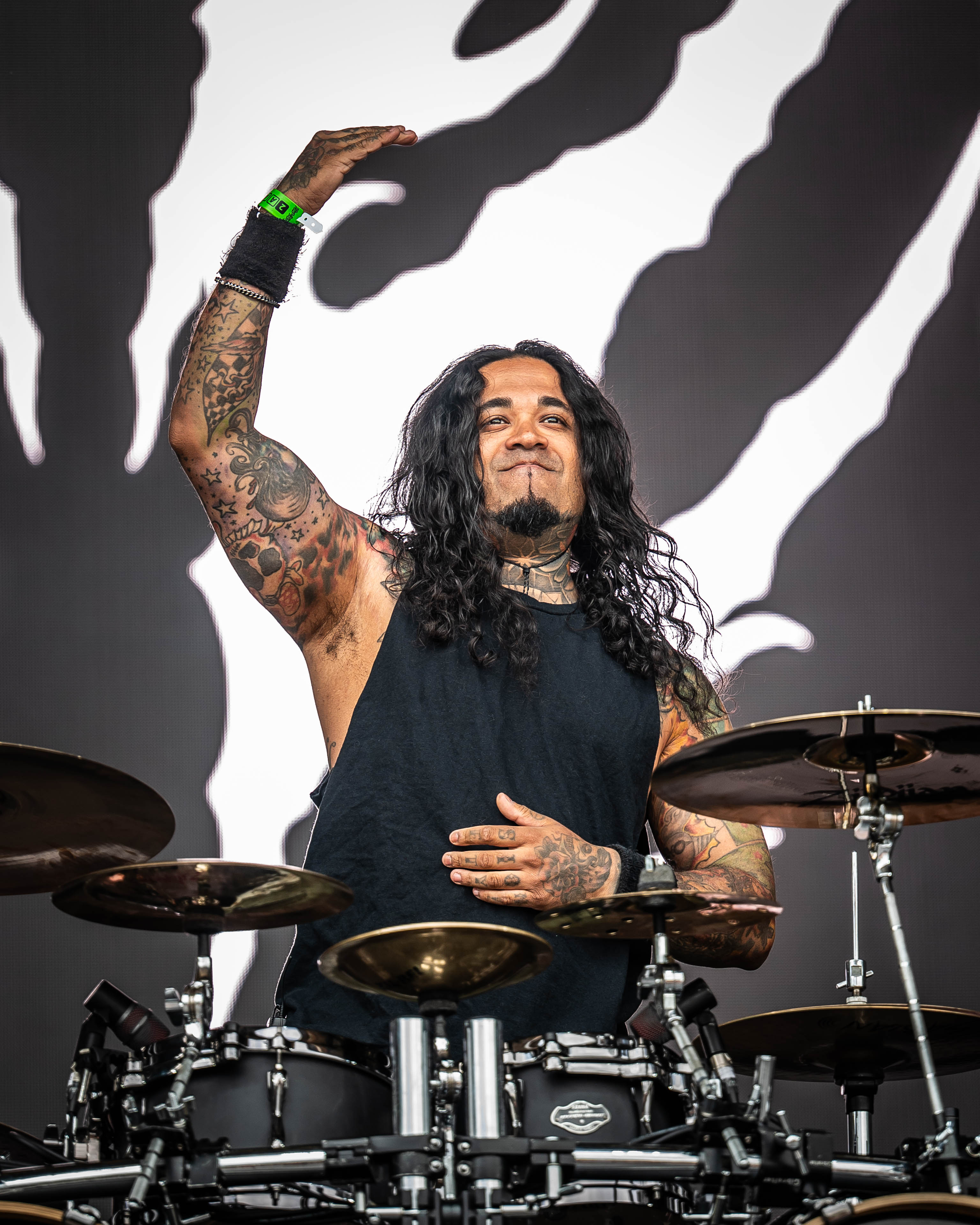
Christopher Wallerstedt

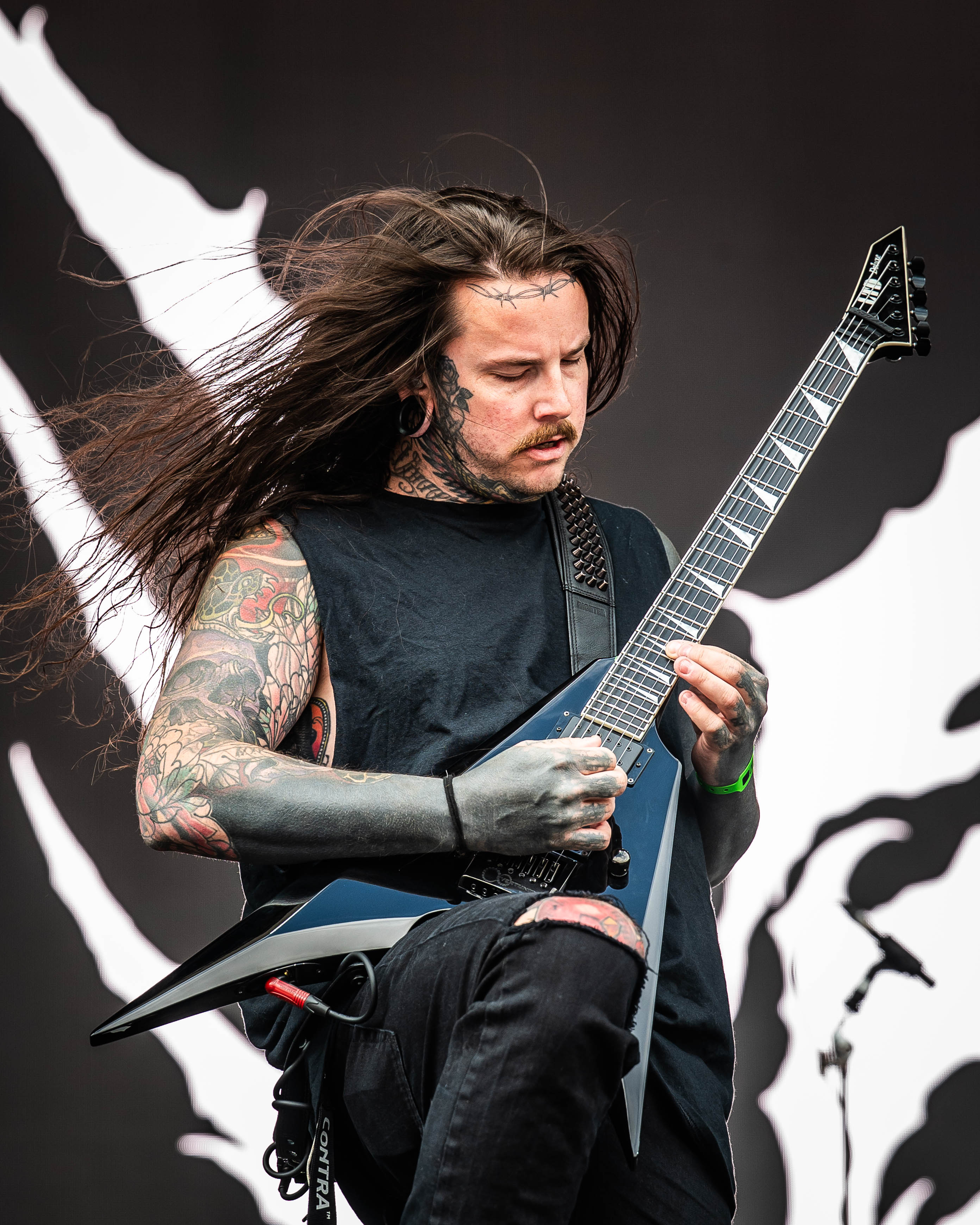
Richard Hansson

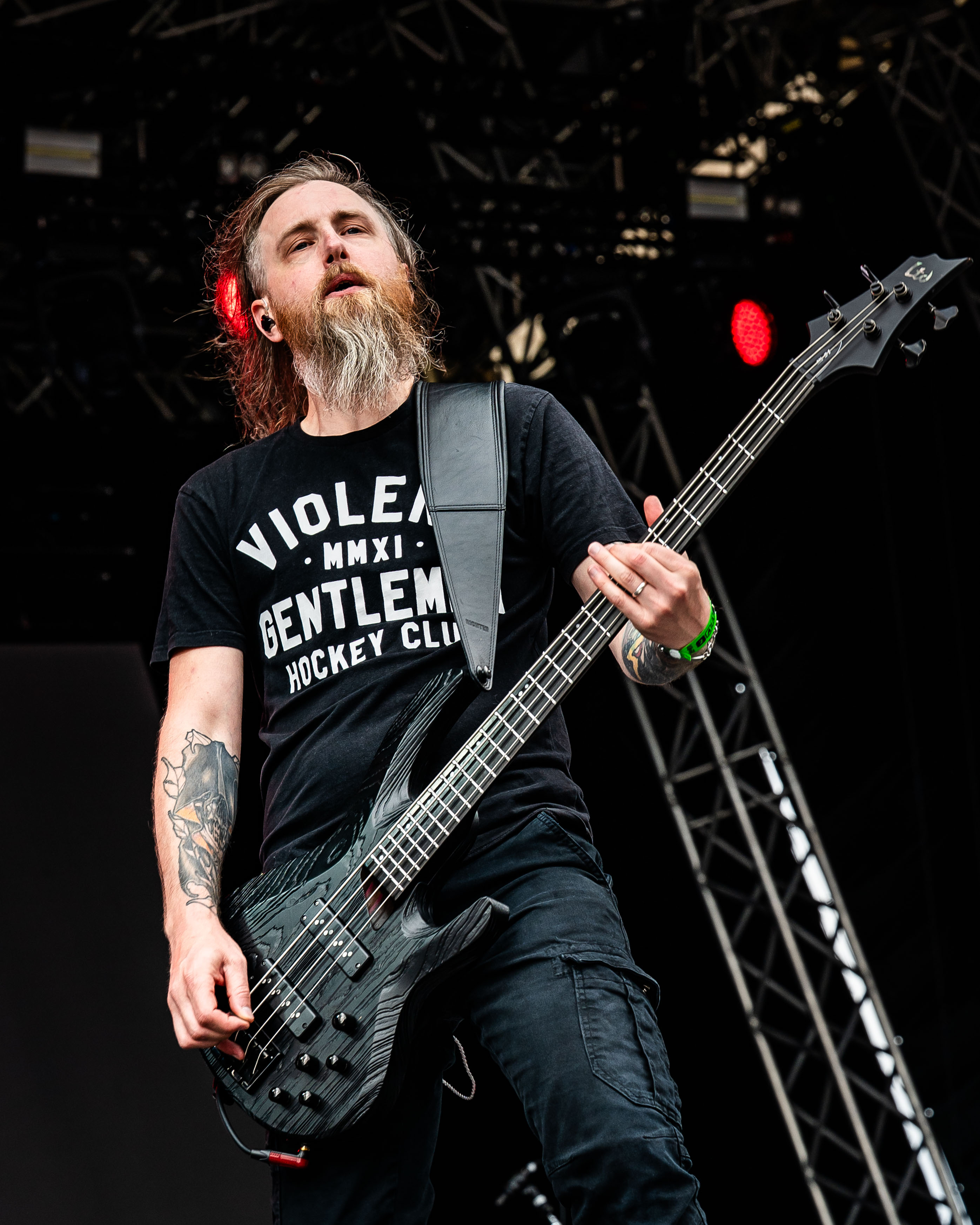
Fredrik Lennartsson

=== Current ===
- Niklas Karlsson – vocals, rhythm guitar (2013–present)
- Richard Hansson – lead guitar (2016–present)
- Fredrik Lennartsson – bass (2016–present)
- Christopher Wallerstedt – drums (2019–present)

=== Former ===
- Christoffer Olsson – bass (2013–2016)
- Maximilian Zinsmeister – lead guitar (2013–2016)
- Markus Bladh – drums (2013–2019)

== Discography ==
Studio albums

- In Medias Res (2014)
- Rasen (2016)
- Nija (2020)
- Descent (2023)
- Death Above Life (2025)

EPs

- Odyssey (2013)
- Redfog (2018)
- Shaman (2021)
- The Forgotten (2023)

Singles

- "Hardwired" (2016)
- "Halloween" (2018)
- "Nensha" (2019)
- "Rebirth" (2020)
- "The Shadowing" (2020)
- "Open Eye" (2020)
- "Flight of the Fireflies" (2021)
- "Carvings" (2021)
- "Shaman" (2021)
- "Vultures of North" (2022)
- "From the Inside" (2023)
- "The Tales of War" (2025)
- "Death Above Life" (2025)
- "Hydra" (2025)
- "Nerve" (2025)
- "Bloodhound" (2025)
