= Death Above Life =

Studio album by Orbit Culture
- Released: 3 October 2025
- Genres: Melodic death metal; groove metal
- Length: 53:04
- Label: Century Media
- Producer: Buster Odeholm

Orbit Culture chronology
Descent (2023)	Death Above Life (2025)

Singles from Death Above Life
- 1. "The Tales of War" Released: 7 May 2025; 2. "Death Above Life" Released: 10 June 2025; 3. "Hydra" Released: 29 July 2025; 4. "Nerve" Released: 3 September 2025; 5. "Bloodhound" Released: 2 October 2025

Death Above Life is the fifth studio album by Swedish melodic death metal band Orbit Culture. It was released on 3 October 2025, via Century Media in LP, CD and digital formats.

== Background ==
The album, consisting of ten songs with a total runtime of approximately fifty-three minutes, was produced by Buster Odeholm. It follows the band's 2023 full-length release, Descent. The band vocalist Niklas Karlsson noted about the album, "It brings up a lot of good and bad emotions but it's a big change for the better. It feels like a rebirth."

The title track was released as a single on 10 June 2025, alongside a music video.

== Reception ==
Professional ratings
Review scores
Source	Rating
Blabbermouth	9/10
Kerrang	4/5
Metal Hammer	4/5 stars
New Noise	4/5 stars

The album received positive reviews, Nick Ruskell of Kerrang! remarked, "Death Above Life feels like they're hauling themselves into the next weight category," giving the album a rating of four out of five. Blabbermouth's Dom Lawson assigned it a rating of nine, describing it as "so powerful and distinctive that it should make peddlers of cookie-cutter mainstream metal feel thoroughly ashamed of themselves."

In a four-star review for Metal Hammer, Stephen Hill stated, "So much of Death Above Life is utterly thrilling. "The Tales of War" is Meshuggah-style death metal boom and burst; "Hydra" features some utterly breathtaking half-time headbanging grooves; and the title track's, stomping, crushing tech metal will immediately weasel its way into your mind."

Randy Radic of New Noise gave the album a four-star rating, referring to it as "a 10-track collection of songs both substantial and full of looming shadows," and opining "With Death Above Life, Orbit Culture demonstrates their ability to not only evolve but maintain full command of their development." Writing for Metal.de, Mirko Pidde opined, "The record could have used a little more variety and the somewhat too well-intentioned loudness is negative here and there, but ultimately Death Above Life has become a damn strong death metal album that every open-minded metalhead should have on their list."

== Track listing ==
All tracks are written by Niklas Karlsson.

Death Above Life track listing
No.	Title	Length
1.	"Inferna"	6:43
2.	"Bloodhound"	5:02
3.	"Inside the Waves"	4:37
4.	"The Tales of War"	5:08
5.	"Hydra"	4:47
6.	"Nerve"	5:52
7.	"Death Above Life"	5:29
8.	"The Storm"	4:13
9.	"Neural Collapse"	6:19
10.	"The Path I Walk"	4:54
Total length:		53:04

Japanese CD bonus track
No.	Title	Length
11.	"Nuclear God"	5:09
Total length:		58:13

== Personnel ==
Credits adapted from Tidal.

=== Orbit Culture ===
- Niklas Karlsson – lead vocals, guitar, co-production, engineering
- Richard Hansson – guitar and acoustic guitar
- Fredrik Lennartsson – bass guitar and piano
- Christopher Wallerstedt – drums, percussion

=== Additional contributor ===
- Buster Odeholm – production, mixing, mastering

== Charts ==
Chart performance for Death Above Life
Chart (2025)	Peak position
Austrian Albums (Ö3 Austria)	9
Belgian Albums (Ultratop Wallonia)	49
Finnish Albums (Suomen virallinen lista)	18
French Physical Albums (SNEP)	72
French Rock & Metal Albums (SNEP)	18
German Albums (Offizielle Top 100)	13
German Rock & Metal Albums (Offizielle Top 100)	3
Japanese Download Albums (Billboard Japan)	99
Japanese Western Albums (Oricon)	29
Scottish Albums (Official Charts)	75
Swedish Albums (Sverigetopplistan)	13
Swiss Albums (Schweizer Hitparade)	24
UK Albums Sales (OCC)	30
UK Rock & Metal Albums (Official Charts)	1
US Top Album Sales (Billboard)	40
