= Descent (Orbit Culture album) =

Studio album by Orbit Culture
- Released: 18 August 2023
- Genres: Melodic death metal; groove metal
- Length: 48:26
- Labels: Seek & Strike
- Producer: Niklas Karlsson

Orbit Culture chronology
Nija (2020)	Descent (2023)	Death Above Life (2025)

Professional ratings
Review scores
Source	Rating
Boolin Tunes	6/10
Chaoszine	5/5 stars
Distorted Sound	7/10
GBHBL	10/10
Ghost Cult Magazine	8/10
Metal Hammer	4/5 stars
Noizze	7/10

Descent is the fourth studio album by Swedish melodic death metal band Orbit Culture. It was released on 18 August 2023, via Seek & Strike Records in LP, CD and digital formats. Frontman Niklas Karlsson stated that Descent was meant to be "a live-friendly album, but in the end it turned out to be this big-ass darker monster," referring to its balance of light and dark elements. "That's what we're pushing for: the highest mountain to the lowest abyss." The album was well-received by critics and audiences, receiving praise and favorable ratings from reviewers. Two songs from the album's recording sessions were later released as part of an EP titled The Forgotten, released later that year.

== Track listing ==
All tracks are written by Niklas Karlsson.

Descent track listing
No.	Title	Length
1.	"Descending"	1:38
2.	"Black Mountain"	5:30
3.	"Sorrower"	6:30
4.	"From the Inside"	6:08
5.	"Vultures of North"	4:38
6.	"Alienated"	3:17
7.	"The Aisle of Fire"	5:44
8.	"Undercity"	5:39
9.	"Descent"	4:19
10.	"Through Time"	5:03
Total length:		48:26

== Personnel ==
=== Orbit Culture ===
- Niklas Karlsson – lead vocals, rhythm guitar, production, mixing, mastering, engineering
- Richard Hansson – lead guitar
- Fredrik Lennartsson – bass guitar
- Christopher Wallerstedt – drums

=== Additional contributor ===
- Max Wellaston – artwork
