= Sevi (band) =

Bulgarian rock band

SEVI
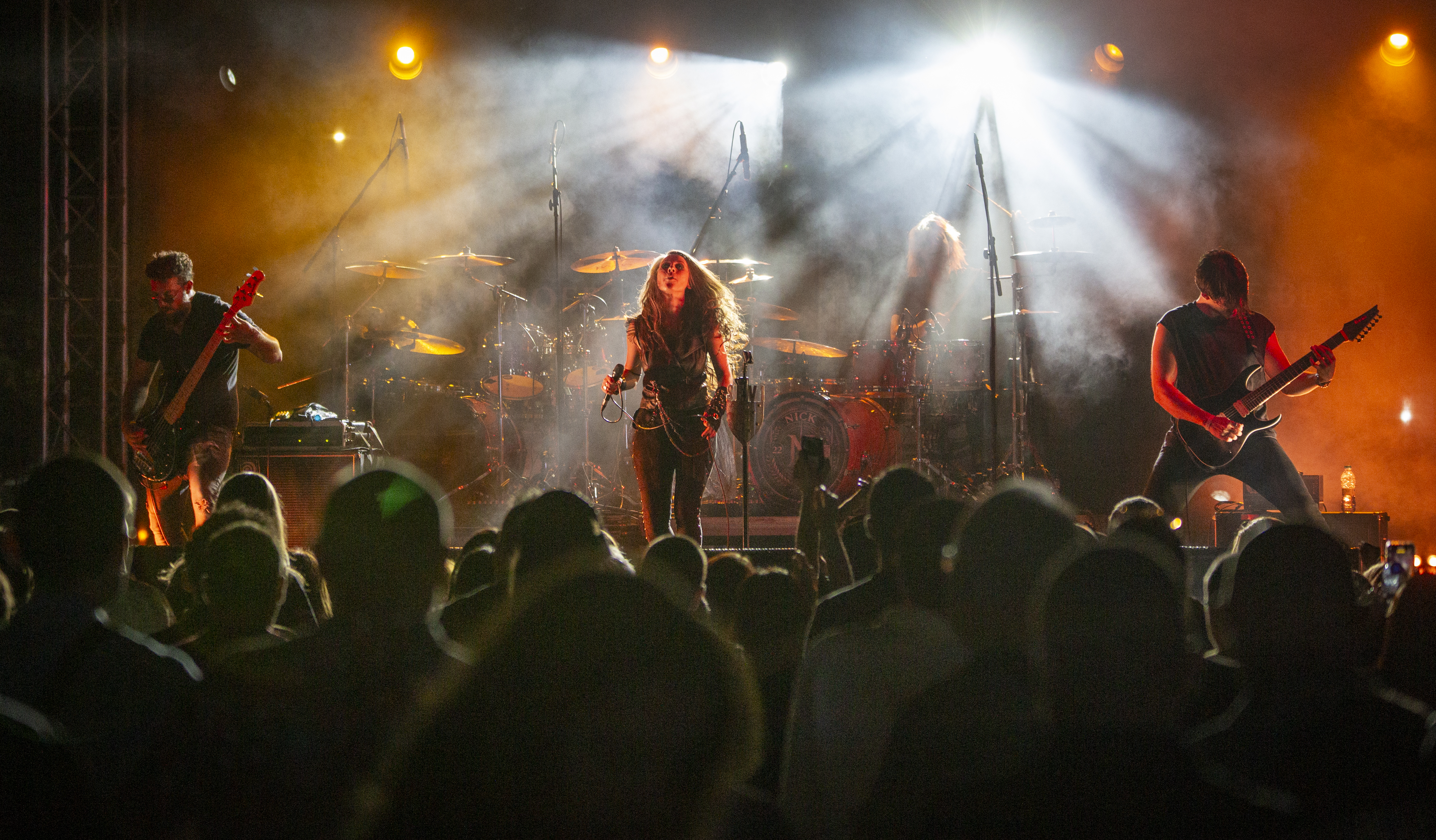
- SEVI official photoshoot 2020

Background information
- Origin: Sofia, Bulgaria
- Genres: Heavy metal, alternative rock, hard rock, soft rock
- Years active: 2010–present
- Label: Indie
- Members: Svetlana "Sevi" Bliznakova; Rally Velinov; Nick Nikolaev; Ivo Galabov
- Past members: Valentin Nikolov; Todor Todorov; Vladimir Donkov; Peter Bratanov; Ilian Iliev; Bobby Zasheff; Tania Apostolova; Temelko Temelkov; Ivan Angelov; Desislava Markova; Delyan Ketipov; Pavlin Ivanov; Alexander Kirilov />Stone Angel />Peter Petrov
- Website: seviband.com

Sevi is a Bulgarian rock band from Sofia. The current members are Svetlana "Sevi" Bliznakova (lead vocals), Ivo Galabov (lead guitar), Rally Velinov (bass guitar) and Nick Nikolaev (drums, percussion). The band describes their music genre as heart rock, a name given to their style due to the emotional content, and message of their songs.

Their debut album, What Lies Beyond, was released on June 14, 2012, in Bulgaria. There were four singles to the album, along with music videos. The first two ("Can't Stand the Pain" and "Limited Edition") were released before the album, and the other two, "Victim" and "Speed Up" came a few months after. On April 23, 2014, Sevi released "On My Own", the first single to their second studio album The Battle Never Ends. The band has released 4 studio albums so far and a LIVE acoustic DVD from 2013.

Over the years, Sevi has lined up among some of the most successful rock and metal bands in Bulgaria.

The band has been part of the line-up of the biggest festivals in Bulgaria and has had numerous concerts in Europe. Their music has been highly appreciated by artists such as Johnny Gioeli (Hardline, Axel Rudi Pell, Crush 40), Thomas Vikstrom (Therion), Jen Majura (Evanescence), Luca Princiotta (Doro Pesch), who also participated in collaborations with Sevi in their albums.

Sevi has also been invited to open the shows for Europe, Black Stone Cherry, Tom Keifer, Hollywood Vampires and Evanescence in Sofia.

== History ==
=== 2005–2010: Sevi solo career ===
In 2005, Svetlana "Sevi" Bliznakova was invited by Italian record producer Rocco Milano to take part in a CD compilation with the song "On My Own, which she had co-written with Pino Biaggioli. The song was recorded with the Italian rock band "Eldritch" and in the beginning of 2014, was re-arranged and re-recorded by Sevi. Bliznakova is (as of 2016) the only Bulgarian singer to have performed in the show Sky Italia in "Club Lost" during the Sanremo Music Festival in 2007. She co-writes many new songs with Rally Velinov, himself a musician and songwriter, who arranges many of Bliznakova's compositions. Velinov later went on to become the bass player, and a key figure in the band. In the summer of 2008, Bliznakova recorded 11 new songs in collaboration with Velinov and guitarist Peter Bratanov. In January 2010, she solidified the idea to create a wider platform and develop her career and claiming a stake in the music business. Together with Velinov, Bliznakova started a band, which she named after her own nickname, Sevi. With this, she makes the band, in essence, an extension of herself.

=== 2010–2012: Formation, Sevi band and What Lies Beyond ===
Sevi was formed in January 2010 with Bliznakova on vocals, Valentin Nikolov on drums, Tania Apostolova on keyboards, Velinov on bass guitar, and Todor Todorov and Vladimir Donkov on guitar. In August 2010, the two guitar players left and were replaced by the former guitarist of Bulgarian alternative rock band "Awake", Peter Bratanov.

By the end 2010, the band had recorded their first single, "Can't Stand the Pain." In February 2011, they also shot a video for it, but the single was released several months later, by which time Peter Bratanov has already left the band. In March 2011, Sevi brought Ivan Angelov to fill the role of lead guitarist.

The original rock style of the band impressed local audiences and many media outlets. In a very short time, Sevi were invited to and played on many radio and TV shows: the late show "Denis & Friends" on BNT 1, SKAT TV, Z-Rock Radio, Bulgarian National Radio, "Radio ORV", among others.

As of January 10, 2010, some of Sevi's songs entered the permanent "Golden Archive" of the Bulgarian National Radio. On November 13, 2010, Sevi won the first-place award for original composition with the song "Fighter for Happiness" at the "Sonic B.A.N.G. competition Bulgaria".

The next year, on June 24, 2011, Sevi released their first official single and video, "Can't Stand The Pain". It is the first video by a Bulgarian artist to be shown at movie theaters, between ads and upcoming movie trailers. "Can't Stand the Pain" and Sevi were named "Band of the week" by Rock Symphony Radio in Lima, Peru.

The summer of 2011 was very successful for Sevi. The band toured extensively in Bulgaria, playing festivals and other open stages. At the "International Festival – Belozem 2011" they won the "Special award". Later in the same year, on November 11, 2011 (11 / 11 / 11), Sevi released their second single and accompanying video to their song "Limited Edition".

In January 2012, the band decided to organize a festival, dedicated to the emerging Bulgarian rock scene, and original rock music. This became the "23 & 1/2h Rock IT Marathon," with the event taking place at the Sofia club and bar Rock IT on March 17 and 18 of 2012. The event featured 30 bands over the course of two days. In the middle of 2012, guitarist Ivan Angelov left the band and was soon after replaced by Bobby Zasheff.

Two weeks later, on June 14, 2012, Sevi released their first official album, "What Lies Beyond". Later that June, the band embarks a national summer tour in support of their debut release. On November 30, 2012, Sevi released their third music video, "Victim", as a prelude to their first all-acoustic live set. Nine days later, on December 9, Bliznakova debuted her collaboration with Sugar DJs, "shocked; the track is billed as "Sevi feat. Sugar DJ's".

=== 2012–present: The Other Side Of Sevi and The New Albums ===
The promo of the single "Victim" gives Sevi yet another opportunity to present themselves in a more imaginative light. After a performance at "Hijack Acoustic" for Z-Rock Radio, Sevi decides to create a full repertoire of acoustic arrangements from the songs that featured on their debut album What Lies Beyond.

The acoustic live show becomes the third original concept of Sevi's themed shows. The first one is created for the "What Lies Beyond Tour 2012" and it presents the band as pirates (in full regalia, replete with functioning cannon), scouring the world's stages gathering new fans by the thousands. After the "Pirate Show," and later the same year, Sevi present their second themed show – the "Route 66 Show". The stage is set with an old-style gas pumping station, like one would see while crossing the border between New Mexico and Nevada; the guitarist lighting a cigarette dangerously close to the pump; the keyboard player in dirty overalls as a mechanic who's ready to take a quick peek under the hood; and the rest – a small team of desperados, ready to set up camp anywhere and entertain the locals. Along the way, while developing these shows and promotions, Sevi start to compile ideas for their second studio album, teasing audiences with the occasional live preview of a new track.

On March 23, 2013, Sevi opens the bike riding season in Sofia, with a performance on a moving flatbed truck platform, while being followed by a motorcade of avid riders. The event was captured on video, footage of which later becomes the single "Speed Up".

"Speed Up" quickly zooms to the top of the Kamenitza Rock 40 chart on Z-Rock Radio and maintains a position in its top 10 for 30 weeks. During 2013, Sevi does a lot of performances on motorcycle meetings and festivals, including performing one of their most notable concerts so far – The "Last Call for 2013". That show is also a heartfelt goodbye with guitarist Bobby Zasheff, who leaves the band as his family is to relocate abroad.

Bobby is replaced with Temelko Temelkov (guitarist for LieVeiL).

The beginning of 2014 signals yet another lineup change where keyboard player Tania Apostolova is replaced by Dessy Markova – an experienced keyboardist, who has worked mainly with cover bands, cruise musicians, and is a rockin' music pedagogue. In June 2014, Sevi is chosen to take part in Kavarna Rock Fest 2014, where an international jury chooses Sevi to be the opening act for the night of the festival that will feature the bands: Europe, Krokus, Gus G, Pretty Maids.

In July 2014 Sevi start their first European tour, which features shows in Greece, Italy and Serbia.

In 2015, the second European tour called "Sevi On Tour 2015", which features shows in Italy, Romania and Serbia.

On their 5-year anniversary, Sevi presents the first part of their book "The Price to Be Yourself", written by the journalist Nikolay Hristov. On October 7 of the same year, Sevi are chosen for an opening act at Tom Keifer's (Cindarella) concert.

They kick off 2016 with the release of their 6th video-single "Don't Hesitate". The track leads the band to a higher level in composing, and they approach the harder and rougher sound. The music video performed with great success on popular video streaming sources and some foreign music television programs.

Sevi second full-length release is entitled The Battle Never Ends. The album is presented at Sofia's club Rock IT on Friday (May) 13th, 2016. Living up to their reputation, the band had prepared a special show for the evening. The stage was set to look like the aftermath of a battlefield, the musicians (including two guest backing vocalists) dressed in black, covered in a cloud of haze. The show starts with a soundscape of brutal winds, clinging swords (courtesy of Rally Velinov), and it features the vocal talents of prominent Bulgarian actor, Asen Blatechki, who reads out lines from the album's eponymous track: "It never ends...so stand... and prepare yourselves...'cause the battle...never...ever...ends" cuing the band to blast into the opening riff of the song! After the performance, Sevi welcomed guests and excited fans into their Fan/VIP area backstage for drinks and selfies.

Soon after comes the second studio album "The Battle Never Ends" (2016) and the singles "Destiny", "One Time Thing". The album got very good reviews in web magazines and magazines like "Powerplay" (UK), "Metal Hammer" (Italy), Latin American "Rockmelodico", "Barikada" (Bosnia&Herzegovina), and others.

On May 16, 2017, Sevi opened the "Europe" tour at Arena Armeec hall, Sofia.

The song "The Call" (2017) put Sevi directly into the metal world and predicts more or less the direction of the third album premiere "Am I Alive?".

Sevi third full-length release is entitled me/ Follow Me. The album features names like Thomas Vikström and Jen Majura from Evanescence. The release date was March 9 with a big show in Sofia Live Club. In June 2019, Sevi released the featuring song with Jen Majura "To Hell and Back" as a single. Fast cars, fire, passion and strong guitar riffs. The song was very well accepted by fans and media.

During the summer of 2019 the band was part of the line-up of some of the biggest festivals in Bulgaria, such as ''Hills of Rock'', Varna Rock and many others along with names like Disturbed, Avantasia and W.A.S.P, Sevi played also on festivals in Greece, Serbia and Romania. On 11 September Sevi opened the show of Evanescence in Arena Armeec and performed their single "To Hell and Back" along with Jen Majura.

In 2019, Sevi's long awaited third album was released featuring names like Thomas Vikström and Jen Majura from Evanescence. The new compositions lead the band on a higher level and refine their unique style. The band works with guitarist and composer – Alexandra Zerner on the arrangements and recordings. The producer Marco Barusso (Lacuna Coil) takes care of the mix and mastering of the album. The band makes a special pre order campaign and a big tour afterwards. The album is preceded by the singles "The call" and "Am I alive?", which are very well accepted by fans and media. "Am I Alive?" topped the chart on the national rock radio station Z-Rock. After the album release, Sevi film the video of "To Hell and Back" – the featuring track with Jen Majura. Soon after the premiere, the band was invited to open for Evanescence in Sofia – Bulgaria on November 11, 2019. This is the second time that the band was on stage at the biggest arena in Bulgaria – Arena Armeec hall. Jen went on stage to perform the song with the band.

The summer of 2019 puts Sevi on the stage of some of the biggest festivals in the country such as ''Hills of Rock'', Varna Rock and many others along with names like Disturbed, Avantasia and W.A.S.P Sevi played also on festivals in Greece, Serbia and Romania.. The band releases also the collaboration with Thomas Vikstrom as a radio single.(2019)

2020 started with a big show celebrating 10 years Sevi and the premiere of the new single "Shattered" – the lead single of the 4th album. During the pandemic, Sevi worked with Johnny Gioeli from a distance on the duet track, "Drowning" (also planned to be part of the upcoming 4th album) and Bliznakova recorded the Crush 40 song "Song of Hope" with Gioeli in an original acoustic arrangement and homemade video.

In November 2020, vocalist Bliznakova released her debut solo album Tomorrow, featuring another duet with Gioeli called "Jaded". The album features also the Italian guitarist Alberto Steri. In April 2021, Sevi started the new season with another stunning video from the upcoming album. "Dark Knight" is like a metal fairy tale, filmed in the fabulous castle Ravadinovo. The spring of 2022 started with the release of the brand-new single "Hate You", part of their 4th album. The band worked on the track with the world-famous producer and songwriter Kane Churko, who also produced Five Finger Death Punch, Ozzy Osbourne, Halestorm and more. Alice Cooper chose to share the track on his radio show "Nights with Alice Cooper".

Right after the premiere, the band hit the road on a short Switzerland tour with Gioeli and his band Hardline. Gioeli then visited Bulgaria for the premiere of a new featuring song with Sevi – "Drowning".

Right after that, the band took off on a tour with Geoff Tate (Queensryche) in Germany.

At the end of 2023 the band has just released their 4th album "Genesis".

Sevi took off 2024 with a new single "World That Doesn't Fit" which got into the selection of the Recording Academy and was Grammy Nomination Considered. Currently, the band is on a European tour to support their new album "Genesis".

== Performances ==
Over the years, Sevi has become notable for their theatrical and original approach to their stage shows. The stage is also decorated to match the theme of the evening; sound designs, scenery, costumes are always integral to the show. Sevi's first such concept, the so-called Pirate Show, was developed in order to enhance the audience's experience for the promotional release of What Lies Beyond, the band's debut. Apart from the stylized costumes, the band members had tucked daggers and pistols into their britches, laid down chains, hanged cobwebs, and scattered skulls around the stage, with the beginning of the show being signaled by cannon fire, courtesy of their own, non-deadly but quite LOUD prop cannon. This theme was taken on the road for the "What Lies Beyond Tour 2012".

A month after the first Pirate Show performance, Sevi returns to the local stage with their second stage design "Route 66." The stage being made to look like a small gas station on a US highway going nowhere, the musicians themselves were in full character; dusty and road-weary, looking for a place to lay down their hats and strike a chord or two.

Following this order, Sevi comes up with the idea to rearrange their songs into a multi-genre acoustic performance. Coupled with the video presentation of the song "The Victim", Sevi set an intimate stage/scene inviting folks to hear and enjoy the band's softer side. The stage is decorated like a cozy and familiar room, hats and umbrellas hanging on hooks, candles shining a soft light on Bliznakova's silhouette, and a chandelier similar to the one used on the video for "Victim."

One of Sevi's most notable shows – "Last Call for 2013" – had Bliznakova in a Steampunk top hat with goggles, leather gloves and chains, with a large metal plate fashioned into the band's logo which adorns her microphone stand. This metal logo remains a constant feature till this day. Guitarist Bobby Zasheff is equally dashing with a leather vest with a pocket watch on a chain peeking out from its pocket.

When it came time to present "On My Own", one of the first songs to be featured on Sevi's second release – The Battle Never Ends, the stage is decorated to resemble a train station, with the musicians acting out bits and scenes from the music video to the delight of fans.

== Band members ==
Current members

- Svetlana "Sevi" Bliznakova – lead vocals (2010–present)
- Rally Velinov – bass (2010–present)
- Nick Nikolaev – drums (2024–present)
- Ivo Galabov – guitar (2024 – present)

Former members

- Todor Todorov – guitar (January 2010 – August 2010)
- Vladimir Donkov – guitar (January 2010 – August 2010)
- Peter Bratanov – guitar (August 2010 – March 2011)
- Valentin Nikolov – drums (January 2010 – July 2011)
- Ivan Angelov – guitar (March 2011 – May 2012, May 2016 – January 2017)
- Bobby Zasheff – guitar, backing vocals (June 2012 – November 2013)
- Tania Apostolova – keyboards, backing vocals (January 2010 – February 2014)
- Temelko Temelkov – guitar (2013 – January 2015)
- Ilian Iliev – guitar (2014 – November 2015)
- Desislava Markova – keyboards, backing vocals (February 2014 – January 2017)
- Delyan Ketipov – guitar (December 2015 – March 2021)
- Alexander Kirilov – guitar (December 2019 – January 2023)
- Pavlin Ivanov – drums (August 2011 – December 2022)
- Peter Petrov – drums (January 2024 – October 2024)
- Stone Angel – guitar (November 2023 – October 2024)

Session/touring members

- Luca Princiotta – guitar (on song Destiny)

== Discography ==
- Can't Stand The Pain (2010)
- Limited Edition (2011)
- What Lies Beyond (2012)
- The Other Side of Sevi (2013)
- Speed Up (2013)
- On My Own (Sevi song ) (2014)
- Don't Hesitate (2016)
- Destiny (2016)
- The Battle Never Ends (2016)
- The Call (2017)
- Am I Alive? (2018)
- Broken Wings (2018)
- Follow Me (2019)
- Shattered (2020)
- Dark Knight (2021)
- Hate You (2022)
- Drowning (2022)
- Insane (2023)
- Genesis (2023)
- World That Doesn't Fit (2024)
- Vampire Love (2025)

== Tours ==
- What Lies Beyond Tour (2012)
- European Tour (2014)
- Sevi on Tour (2015)
- Sevi the Battle Never Ends Tour (2016)
- Sevi Follow Me Tour (2019)
- Sevi on Tour Germany - Special Guest at Geoff Tate Empire 30th Anniversary Tour (2022)
- Sevi Genesis Tour - (2024)

== Awards and nominations ==
- 1st place at Sonic B.A.N.G competition Bulgaria with "Fighter For Happiness"
- "Band of the Week" at Rock Symphony Radio, Lima (Peru)
- Grammy Nomination Considered for the song "World That Doesn't Fit
