= Panican Whyasker =

Bulgarian rock and roll band

- Origin: Sofia, Bulgaria
- Genres: Rock and roll, crossover, experimental, instrumental, drum and bass
- Years active: 1998–present
- Labels: Avenue Productions, Top Form Studio
- Members: Dimitar Vasilev-Nufri; Deyan Dragiev-Dakata; Dushko Krumov; Alexandar Obretenov
- Past members: Ivo Peshev; Alexandar Yanev; Martin Evstatiev

Panican Whyasker is a Bulgarian four-piece rock and roll band formed in the end of 1998 by Dimitar Vasilev-Nufri (guitars & vocals) and Deyan Dragiev-Dakata (drums). Its early years the band spent experimenting with a large range of genres from instrumental drum’n’bass to crossover. After three full-length albums, numerous gigs, several side projects and somewhat of a hiatus, the band is currently writing their fourth full-length album - a comeback to their rock’n’roll roots.

== The early years and Rock’n’Roll Coma ==
Panican Whyasker was started in late 1998 by Dimitar Vasilev-Nufri's (former Pyromania, Plastic Hi-Fi member) and Deyan Dragiev-Dakata (former Тъмно member). The first Panican Whyasker songs were written before the end of 1998 with Dushko Krumov on the guitar and Alexandar Yanev on the bass. In February 1999 Dushko went to Germany and Ivo Peshev (currently a guitarist in Skitnicks) came aboard. In this line-up and in the spring of 1999 the band recorded their debut album Rock’n’Roll Coma. A year later it was published by Avenue Productions. Its launch was accompanied by two videos - for the tracks “Лара Крофт“ and “Нов петък“, the latter was shot by Nufri and his wife Bojidara Vasileva at their home. The album was highly appreciated in Bulgaria and awarded Best Debut for 2000 by the Bulgarian music television MM TV.

== Digital Zombie ==
After Rock’n’Roll Coma Panican Whyasker decided to take a different direction. Computers were becoming more and more accessible and those technologies were entering more and more rehearsal rooms and studios. Always open for experiments, the band started mashing rock’n’roll with drum’n’bass. They used samples, loops and in general a lot of electronics. One of their strongest influences of that time could be found in the Serbian band Disciplin A Kitschme.

During that period the underground shows in Sofia were mostly located in a cult, now nonexistent venue called O!Shipka. The gigs Panican Whyasker were playing were many, and their fanbase was growing. They lost no time but started recording their second album titled Digital Zombie. In the autumn of 2001, it was released by Top Form Studio, a new collective that Panican Whyasker got involved with for their shared passion for exploring the uprising digital technologies.

The record was distributed by Avenue Productions and was launched on a very special promo show at the now non-existent “Neo” club in Sofia. The event was completely in line with the whole digital concept of the record. It was a high-end multimedia performance, with a special scenography and a lot of live electronics besides Panican Whyasker's usual rock’n’roll sound.

The record was again accepted favorably by the audience and awarded Best Rock Album for 2001 by the Bulgarian MM TV.

== Eastern European Monkeys ==
In 2002 Panican Whyasker were already a band with two full-lengths, extensive gig agenda and a set topping 2 hours, something of a rarity for an underground band, especially from Bulgaria. All these live shows lead to the band members starting to wonder in what direction should they move their music. The decision was to drastically reduce the electronics and start writing songs in English. And so from 2002 to 2005 Panican Whyasker worked on Eastern European Monkeys. It was also published in the spring of 2005 again by Top Form Studio. Its release was accompanied by a video clip for the song Hair Plugin.

Eastern European Monkeys was strongly criticized because of the English lyrics. The band was annoyed by this feedback and inner conflicts begin to appear. After the record promo gig Alexandar Yanev quit the band. For the next seven years he was replaced by Martin Evstatiev (Subtierra, Der Hunds), but eventually in 2013 left the band as well. The need to be on the look for a new bassist became one of the reasons for the next several problematic years for Panican Whyasker.

Those the band members spent working on side projects. Dakata started playing in Ревю, and Nufry started Bastardolomey and later the rock band Skitnicks.

Despite all negative feedback and the slight backdown of some fans, Eastern European Monkey was also awarded Best Rock Album in 2005 by MM TV.

== Present ==
Since 2006 Panican Whyasker have been struggling to write and agree on the material that should become their fourth full-length album. Until 2013 things were going way too slow. Many tracks were created and then thrown away. However, now, with a new bassist on board, namely Alexander Obretenov from the Bulgarian rock band D2, they are more than excited to bring the pieces back together and finally record and release their long-anticipated return.

Panican Whyasker's new album, Sick Coloured Planet, was released in May 2017. Recorded in Sofia over a span of almost five years, due to changing of personnel and other issues within the band, it was mixed by Bill Gould from Faith No More. The album was mastered by Maor Applebaum, who worked with artist such as Faith no More, Halford, Sepultura. The result is a fine-sounding rock album, containing eight songs.

== Discography ==
- Rock’n’Roll Coma (2000)
- Digital Zombie (2001)
- Eastern European Monkeys (2005)
- Sick Colored Planet (2017)

== Awards ==
MM TV (Bulgaria)

Year	Recipient	Award	Result
2000	Rock’n’Roll Coma	Best Debut	Awarded
2001	Digital Zombie	Best Rock Album	Awarded
2005	Eastern European Monkeys	Best Rock Album	Awarded

Official Videos

- “Лара крофт”
- “Човека нечовек“
- “Нов петък”
- “Hair Plugin”
- „Пънчо“
