= Dreamshade =

Swiss metalcore band

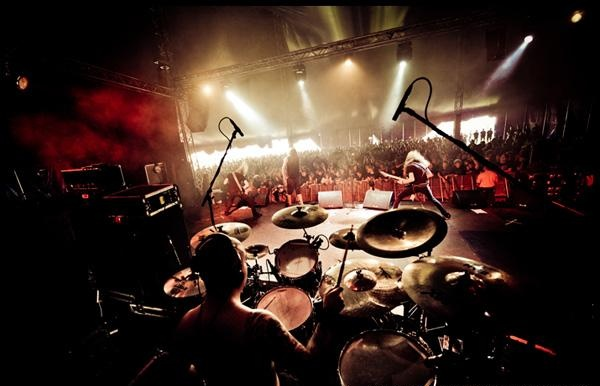
Dreamshade at Summer Breeze Open Air, 2009.

Dreamshade is a Swiss metalcore band. They have released four studio albums.

The band was founded in 2006 in Lugano. In their early career, the band released on Spinefarm Records.

== Discography ==
- What Silence Hides (2011)
- The Gift of Life (2013)
- Vibrant (2016)
- A Pale Blue Dot (2021)
