= Victim (Sevi song) =

Single by Sevi

from the album What Lies Beyond
- Released: November 30, 2012
- Length: 4:45
- Label: Indie
- Songwriters: Svetlana “Sevi” Bliznakova, Rally Velinov
- Producer: Sevi

Victim is a song of the Bulgarian band Sevi, which became the third single to their debut album What Lies Beyond. The song was created in the summer of 2011 and later recorded as a single of the band. The featured video of the song was shot during the national tour of Sevi – the What Lies Beyond Tour and officially released on November 30, 2012. The arrangement and the lyrics of the song launched the track in the rock charts right after the promotion of the video. It almost immediately reached fifth position in Kamenitza Rock 40 for a couple of weeks, as well as number 1 for a week.
