= Z-Rock (Bulgaria) =

Bulgaria
- Frequencies: Burgas – 105.1 MHz; Haskovo – 102.1 MHz; Lovech – 88.7 MHz; Montana – 91.6 MHz; Pleven – 87.9 MHz; Plovdiv – 103.7 MHz; Razgrad – 106.0 MHz; Sofia – 89.1 MHz; Stara Zagora – 100.1 MHz; Varna – 95.9 MHz; Veliko Tarnovo – 105.7 MHz; Vidin – 97.8 MHz; Yambol – 102.2 MHz

Programming
- Format: rock music

Ownership
- Owner: Oberon Radio Max

History
- First air date: 13 October 2006

Links
- Website: http://www.zrockradio.bg

Radio Z-Rock is a Bulgarian rock music radio station, launched in 2006. It is part of a subsidiary owned by Oberon Radio Max (75%). The radio started on the frequencies of Radio New Europe. Z-Rock is the second rock radio station in Bulgaria after the close down of Rock radio Tangra in 2003. The station airs in Burgas, Pleven, Varna, Veliko Tarnovo, Vidin, Lovech, Montana, Plovdiv, Razgrad, Sofia, Stara Zagora, Haskovo and Yambol. Listeners can expect the hits of Deep Purple, The Rolling Stones, AC/DC, and Kiss.
