= Sevi (singer) =

Bulgarian singer-songwriter

Svetlana Bliznakova - Sevi
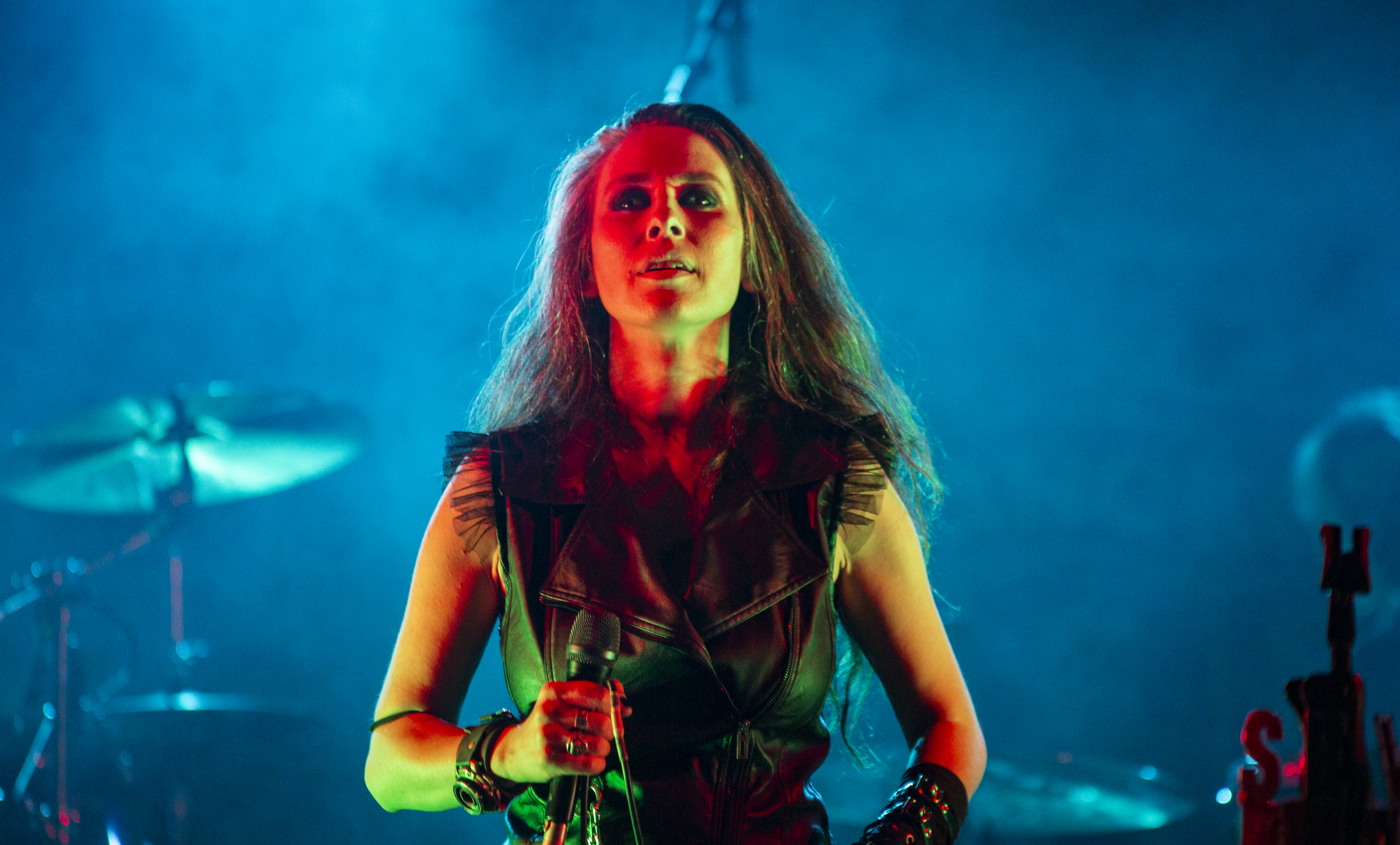
- Svetlana Bliznakova (SEVI) on stage

Background information
- Also known as: Sevi
- Born: Svetlana Ilieva Bliznakova; November 11, 1983 (age 42); Sofia, Bulgaria
- Genres: Alternative rock, hard rock, pop, electronic
- Occupations: Musician, singer-songwriter
- Instruments: Vocals, piano
- Years active: 2005–present
- Label: Independent
- Member of: Sevi
- Website: seviband.com

Svetlana Ilieva Bliznakova, born on November 11, 1983, is a Bulgarian singer, musician and songwriter. She started her solo music career in 2005 and since 2010 she is the front woman of the Bulgarian rock band Sevi.

== Early life and arts ==
Svetlana "Sevi" Bliznakova was born on November 11, 1983 in Sofia, Bulgaria. Raised by a family of history teachers, she was unexpectedly drawn into art at an early age. Sevi began singing when she was two years old and eight years later, she went to the "Philip Koutev Folklore Ensemble" and studied national Bulgarian folk singing for two years. After that, she studied singing opera, and in 2002 she entered Sofia University in an opera class in order to develop her music skills. A year after, she found herself in pop and rock music and decided to start over. She entered the class of Etien Levi, a famous Bulgarian pop singer of the 1980s. In ten months, Sevi started performing on stage, and soon after she started to write her own songs. Later, due to her visits in Italy, she began writing songs in Italian, along with the English ones.

== 2004–2010: Solo music career and the Italian period ==
In 2004 Sevi won first prize and special award of the jury, participating at the "National Competition for Singers", Sofia. In 2005, she participated with two original songs and won the first prize at the "International Belozem Festival". These two songs were published in the Festival CD compilation for 2006. Again in 2005, Sevi was invited by the Italian producer Rocco Milano to take part in a CD compilation with her song "On My Own", co-written with Pino Biaggioli and recorded with the Italian rock band "Eldritch". The compilation was edited by the organization "Arts Planet". In 2006, Sevi participated with an author song on the "International Pop-Rock Competition for Singers and Composers" in Veliko Turnovo. By now she has written more than 50 songs in English and Italian. She has been the only Bulgarian singer to sing in the show of Sky Italia in "Club Lost" during the Sanremo Music Festival in 2007. She co-wrote many new songs with Rally Velinov (musician and songwriter, who is also author of the arrangements of many of her recordings, and later became the bass player in the band Sevi). In summer of 2008 Sevi recorded 11 new songs in collaboration with Rally Vellinov and the guitar player Peter Bratanov. She presented six of the songs on a one-hour live interview on "WSF Radio Chicago" on July 4, 2009. In August 2009, her song "Fighter For Happiness" was presented on "Many More Radio UK". In January 2010, in order to develop her career and popularize her music, Sevi together with Rally Velinov, formed a band also called Sevi.

== 2010–present: Formation of Sevi band ==
The band Sevi was formed in January 2010 by Svetlana Bliznakova and Rally Velinov - bass guitar with the musicians Valentin Nikolov – drums, Tania Apostolova – keyboards, Todor Todorov – guitar and Vladimir Donkov – guitar. In August 2010 the two guitar players were replaced by the former guitarist of the alternative rock band "Awake" – Peter Bratanov. In March 2011 the lead guitar player of the band became Ivan Angelov, who left in the middle of 2012. Soon after, on May 30, 2012, lead guitarist of the band become Bobby Zasheff. On June 14, 2012, Sevi released their first official album, "What Lies Beyond". In the same month, the band started a national summer tour to present the album.

== Discography ==
- Can't Stand The Pain (2010)
- Limited Edition (2011)
- What Lies Beyond (2012)
- The Other Side of Sevi (2013)
- The Battle Never Ends (2016)
- Follow Me (2019)
- Tomorrow (2020)
- Genesis (2023)

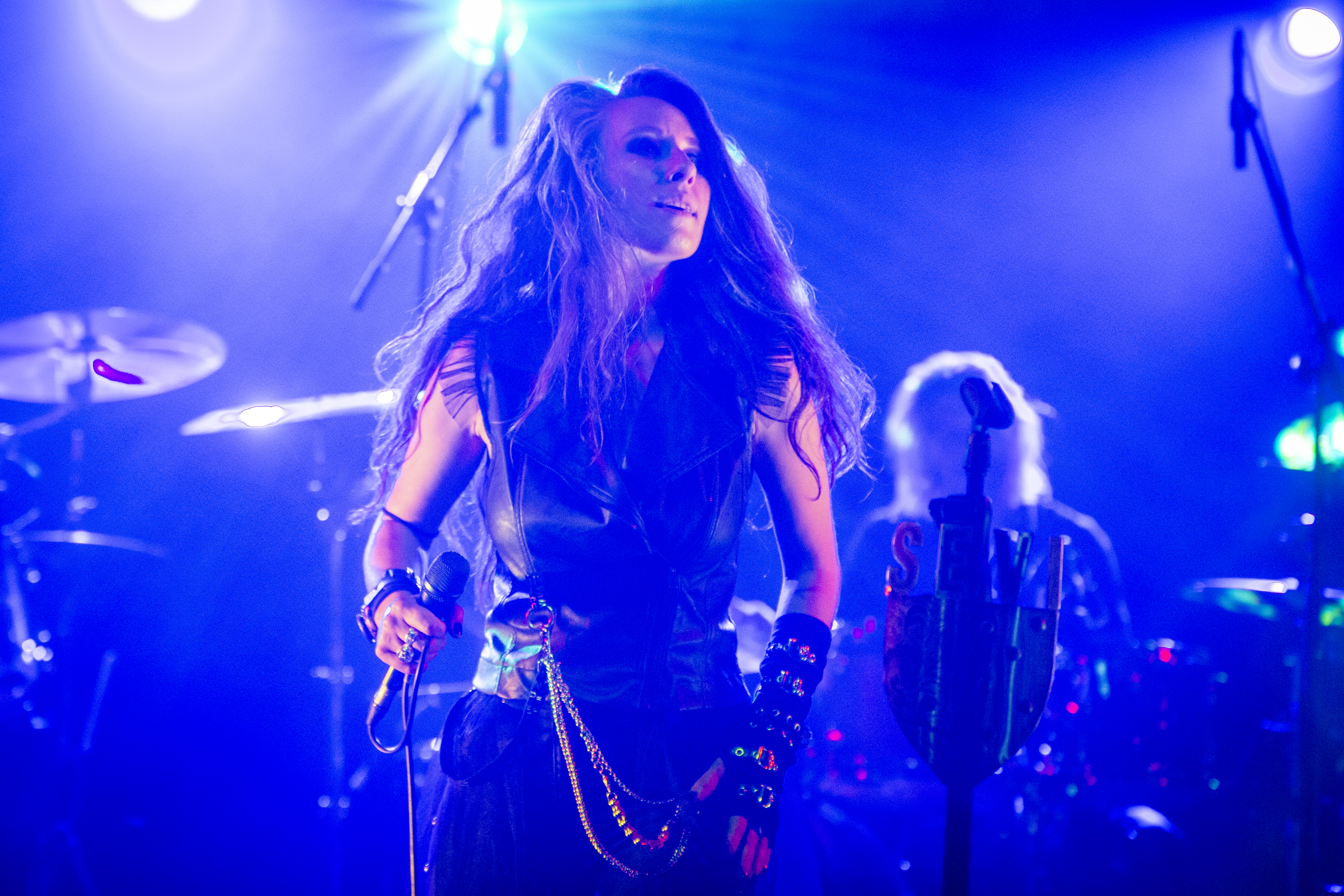
Svetlana Ilieva Bliznakova

== Awards and nominations ==
- 1st place at Sonic B.A.N.G competition Bulgaria with "Fighter For Happiness"
- "Band of the Week" at Rock Symphony Radio, Lima (Peru)
- "Hip Rock Look" at Hip Rock Magazine
- "Grammy Nomination Considered
