= List of horror films of 2006 =

The following is a list of horror films released in 2006.

Horror films released in 2006
Title	Director	Cast	Country	Notes
The 8th Plague	Franklin Guerrero Jr.	Charles Powell, DJ Perry, Hollis McLachlan	United States	Direct-to-video
9:56	Ahn Byung-Ki	Yuko Fueki, Kim Gyu-min, Park Ha-seon	South Korea	
Abominable	Ryan Schifrin	Matt McCoy, Michael Deak, Haley Joel	United States	
All the Boys Love Mandy Lane	Jonathan Levine	Amber Heard, Anson Mount, Michael Welch	United States	
Altered	Eduardo Sanchez	Brad William Henke, Paul McCarthy Boyington	United States	
An American Haunting	Courtney Solomon	Donald Sutherland, Sissy Spacek, Rachel Hurd-Wood	United States	
Beastly Boyz	David DeCoteau	Sebastian Gacki, Valerie Murphy, Kyle Schwitek	Canada; United States	
Behind the Mask: The Rise of Leslie Vernon	Scott Glosserman	Nathan Baesel, Angela Goethals, Robert Englund	United States	
Big Bad Wolf	Lance W. Dressen	Trevor Duke, Kimberly J. Brown, Sarah Christine Smith	United States	
Bit Parts	Dave Reda	Michelle Angel, Peter Redman, Molly Fix	United States	
Black Christmas	Glen Morgan	Katie Cassidy, Michelle Trachtenberg, Mary Elizabeth Winstead	United States	
Black Sheep	Jonathan King	Nathan Meister, Peter Feeney, Danielle Mason	New Zealand	
Blood Curse	Tiago Guedes and Frederico Serra	Adriano Luz, Manuela Couto, Sara Carinhas, José Afonso Pimentel	Portugal	
Blood Ranch	Corbin Timbrook	Dayton Knoll, Season Hamilton, Mike Faiola	United States	Direct-to-video
Bloodmyth	John Rackham	Jane Gull, Ben Shockley, Robert Hartley Wainwright	United Kingdom	
Bloody Mary	Richard Valentine	Christian Schrapff, Amber Borycki, Matthew Borlenghi	United States	
Bonesaw	Jett Blakk		United States	
Bram Stoker's Dracula's Curse	Leigh Scott	Thomas Downey, Eliza Swenson, Tom Nagel	United States	
The Breed	Nicholas Mastandrea	Michelle Rodriguez, Hill Harper, Taryn Manning	United States	
Broken	Adam Mason, Simon Boyes	Nadja Brand, Eric Colvin, Abbey Stirling	United Kingdom	
Candy Stripers	Kate Robbins	Nicole Rayburn, Kevin Thomas Fee, Sarah McGuire	United States	
Caved In: Prehistoric Terror	Richard Pepin	Chelan Simmons, Angela Featherstone, Monica Barladeanu	Canada; United States	
Cinderella	Bong Man-dae	Shin Se-kyung,Do Ji-won,Jeon So-min,Yoo Da-in,Jo Sung-ha	South Korea	
Cold Prey	Roar Uthaug	Rune Melby, Ingrid Bolsø Berdal, Rolf Kristian Larsen	Norway	
The Covenant	Renny Harlin	Steven Strait, Sebastian Stan, Laura Ramsey	United States	
Creepshow 3	Ana Clavell, James Glenn Dudelson	Stephanie Pettee, Roy Abramsohn, Susan Schramm	United States	
The Curse of King Tut's Tomb	Russell Mulcahy	Malcolm McDowell, Casper Van Dien, Parvin Dabas	United States	
The Curse of Lizzie Borden	Ford Austin	Danielle De Luca, Jed Rowen, Kerry Lynne Feirman	United States	
The Damned	Eduardo Quiroz, Jose Quiroz	Jose Rosete, Victor Zaragoza, Todd Bridges	United States	
Dark Corners	Ray Gower	Toby Stephens, Thora Birch, Christien Anholt	United States; United Kingdom	
Dark Fields	Allan Randall, Mark McNabb		Canada	Direct-to-video
Dark Ride	Craig Singer	Jennifer Tisdale, Jamie-Lynn Sigler, Patrick Renna, David Rogers	United States	
Darna Zaroori Hai	J.D. Chakravarthi, Manish Gupta, Sajid Khan, Jijy Philip, Prawal Raman, Vivek Shah, Ram Gopal Varma	Amitabh Bachchan, Mallika Sherawat, Sunil Shetty	India	
A Dead Calling	Michael Feifer	Sid Haig, Bill Moseley, Timothy Oman	United States	Direct-to-video
Dead and Deader	Patrick Dinhut	Natassia Malthe, Dean Cain, Ellie Cornell	United States	
Dead in the Water	Marc Buhmann	Alissa Bailey, Christie Burgess, Megan Renee Burgess	United States	
Death Row	Kevin VanHook	Jake Busey, Stacy Keach, Shanna Collins	United States	
Desperation	Mick Garris	Tom Skerritt, Sylva Kelegian, Ron Perlman	United States	Television film
The Devil's Chair	Adam Mason	Pollyanna Rose, Olivia Hill, Elize du Toit	United Kingdom	
The Devil's Den	Jeff Burr	Kelly Hu, Devon Sawa, Ken Foree	United States	
Die and Let Live	Justin Channell	Zane Crosby, Sarah Bauer, Lloyd Kaufman	United States	
Dorm	Songyos Sugmakanan	Chalee Trairat, Jintara Sugapat, Siranath Jianthavorn	Thailand	
Dorm of the Dead	Donald Farmer	Tiffany Shepis, Kiersten Hall, Vera Vanguard	United States	
Dracula's Guest	Michael Feifer	Wes Ramsey, Amy Lyndon, Maya Waterman	United States	
Drawn in Blood	Péter Palátsik	Anna Fin, Dan van Husen, Patrick Dewayne	Germany	
Driftwood	Tim Sullivan	Ricky Ullman, Diamond Dallas Page, Lin Shaye	United States	
Driller	Songyos Sugmakanan	Tanya Dempsey, Eric Spudic, Jef Rowen	United States	
Easter Bunny, Kill! Kill!	Chad Ferrin	Timothy Muskatell, Marina Blumenthal, Trent Haaga	United States	
Evil	Yorgos Noussias	Meletis Georgiadis, Mary Tsoni, Themis Katz	Greece	
Evil Bong	Charles Band	Tommy Chong, Bill Moseley Tim Thomerson	United States	
Fallen Angels	Jeff Thomas	Bill Moseley, Adrianne Curry, Kane Hodder	United States	
Feeding Grounds	Junior Bonner	Jamie Gannon, Kiralee Hayashi, Alex Ballar	United States	
Fido	Andrew Currie	Carrie-Anne Moss, Billy Connolly, Dylan Baker	Canada	
Final Destination 3	James Wong	Mary Elizabeth Winstead, Ryan Merriman, Kris Lemche, Alexz Johnson	United States	
Five Across the Eyes	Greg Swinson, Ryan Thiessen	Sandra Paduch, Danielle Lilley, Angela Brunda	United States	
Frankenstein Reborn	Leigh Scott	Rhett Giles, Eliza Swenson, Matt Kawczynski	United States	
Frankenstein's Bloody Nightmare	John R. Hand	Amy Olivastro, Chester Delacruz, Justine Davis	United States	
FrightWorld	David R. Williams, Mike Bohatch	Tiffany Scott, Michael Ciesla, Crystal Gonzales	United States	
Frostbiten	Anders Banke	Emma Åberg, Måns Nathanaelson, Grete Havnesköld	Sweden	
Gangs of the Dead	Duanne Stinnett	Enrique Almeida, Howard Alonzo, Reggie Bannister	United States	
Ghost Son	Lamberto Bava	Laura Harring, Pete Postlethwaite, Coralina Cataldi-Tassoni	Italy; South Africa; Spain; United Kingdom	
Ghost Train	Takeshi Furusawa	Erika Sawajiri, Shun Oguri	Japan	
The Gingerdead Man	Charles Band	Gary Busey, Robin Sydney, Ryan Locke	United States	Horror comedy
God's Left Hand, Devil's Right Hand	Shusuke Kaneko	Asuka Shibuya, Al Maeda, Momoko Shimizu	Japan	
The Gravedancers	Mike Mendez	Dominic Purcell, Josie Maran, Clare Kramer	United States	
Grimm Love	Martin Weisz	Thomas Huber, Keri Russell, Thomas Kretschmann	Germany	
The Grudge 2	Takashi Shimizu	Amber Tamblyn, Arielle Kebbel, Jennifer Beals	United States	
Guardians	Drew Maxwell	Tara Ketterer, Hemi Marcum, Neda Stevic	Turkey	
Halloween Night	Mark Atkins	Rebekah Kochan, Nicholas Daly Clark, Amelia Jackson-Gray	United States	
Hatchet	Adam Green	Joel Moore, Tamara Feldman, Deon Richmond	United States	
The Hills Have Eyes	Alexandre Aja	Aaron Stanford, Emilie de Ravin, Dan Byrd, Vinessa Shaw	United States	
Hoboken Hollow	Glen Stephens	C. Thomas Howell, Lin Shaye, Dennis Hopper	United States	
Hood of Horror	Stacy Title	Snoop Dogg, Lin Shaye, Danny Trejo	United States	
Horrors of War	Peter John Ross, John Whitney	Jon Osbeck, Joe Lorenzo, Daniel Alan Kiely	United States	Science fiction horror
The Host	Bong Joon-ho	Song Kang-ho, Byun Hee-bong, Park Hae-il	South Korea	
I'll Always Know What You Did Last Summer	Sylvain White	Brooke Nevin, David Paetkau, Torrey DeVitto, Ben Easter	United States	Direct-to-video
Joshua	Travis Betz	Ward Roberts, Aaron Gaffey, Christy Jackson	United States	
Kraken: Tentacles of the Deep	Tibor Takács	Charlie O'Connell, Victoria Pratt, Jack Scalia	United States	Television film
Legend of the Sandsquatch	Lola Wallace	Mike Korich, Travis Betz, Katie Rhine	United States	
The Legend of Viper's Hill	David A. Lloyd	Brian Hillhouse, Tina Michaud, Donna Henry	United States	
Living Death	Erin Berry	Kristy Swanson, Vik Sahay, Rajiv Narang	Canada	
The Lonely Ones	David Michael Quiroz Jr.	Heather Conforto, Jose Rosete, Ron Berg	United States	
The Lost	Chris Sivertson	Marc Senter, Jennifer Fitch, Alex Frost	United States	
The Marsh	Jordan Barker	Gabrielle Anwar, Niamh Wilson, Forest Whitaker	Canada	
Mr. Jingles	Tommy Brunswick	John Anton, Kelli Jensen, Jessica Hall, Nathanial Ketchum	United States	
Night of the Living Dead 3-D	Jeff Broadstreet	Sid Haig, Brianna Brown, Greg Travis	United States	
Nightmare Man	Rolfe Kanefsky	Tiffany Shepis, Hanna Putnam, Luciano Szafir	United States	
The Omen	John Moore	Julia Stiles, Liev Schreiber, Mia Farrow	United States	
One Missed Call: Final	Manabu Asou	Meisa Kuroki, Jang Guen-Seok, Maki Horikita	Japan	
Pathogen	Emily Hagins	Rose Kent-McGlew, Tiger Darrow, Alec Herskowitz	United States	
Penny Dreadful	Richard Brandes	Rachel Miner, Mimi Rogers, Mickey Jones, Michael Berryman	United States	
Plasterhead	Kevin Higgins	Kathryn Merry, Ernest Dancy, Raine Brown	United States	Direct-to-video
Pulse	Jim Sonzero	Kristen Bell, Ian Somerhalder, Rick Gonzalez	United States	
The Pumpkin Karver	Robert Mann	Amy Weber, Minka Kelly, Terrence Evans	Australia; United States	Direct-to-video
Pumpkinhead: Ashes to Ashes	Jake West	Doug Bradley, Tess Panzer, Lance Henriksen	Romania; United Kingdom; United States	
Re-cycle	Danny Pang, Oxide Pang Chun	Angelica Lee, Lawrence Chou, Siu-Ming Lau	Thailand; Hong Kong	
The Remake	Tommy Brunswick	Cassy Harlo, Jessica Hall, Heather Doba	United States	
Requiem	Hans-Christian Schmid	Sandra Hueller, Burghart Klaussner, Imogen Kogge	Germany	
Resonnances	Philippe Robert	Franck Monsigny, Livane Revel, Yann Sundberg	France	
Rest Stop: Dead Ahead	John Shiban	Jaimie Alexander, Deanna Russo, Joey Lawrence	United States	
Ring Around the Rosie	Rubi Zack	Gina Philips, Tom Sizemore, Jenny Mollen	United States	
Saw III	Darren Lynn Bousman	Tobin Bell, Shawnee Smith, Dina Meyer	United States	
Séance	Mark L. Smith	Kandis Erickson, A.J. Lamas, Bridget Shergalis	United States	
See No Evil	Gregory Dark	Glenn Jacobs, Christina Vidal	United States	
Serum	Steve Franke	Lizabeth Cardenas, Bill Sebastian, Dennis O'Neill	United States	
Severance	Christopher Smith	Danny Dyer, Laura Harris, Tim McInnerny	United Kingdom; Germany	
Sheitan	Kim Chapiron	Vincent Cassel, Ladj Ly, Monica Bellucci	France	
Silent Hill	Christophe Gans	Radha Mitchell, Sean Bean, Laurie Holden	Canada; France	
Simon Says	William Dear	Crispin Glover, Greg Cipes, Blake Lively	United States	
Sl8n8	Edwin Visser, Frank van Geloven	Carolina Dijkhuizen, Linda van der Steen, Victoria Koblenko	Netherlands	
The Slaughter	Jay Lee	Billy Beck, Penny Drake, Brad Milne	United States	
Slaughtered Vomit Dolls	Lucifer Valentine	Ameara Lavey, Pig Lizzy, Maja Lee	Canada	
Slayer	Kevin VanHook	Danny Trejo, Ray Park, Casper Van Dien	United States	
Slither	James Gunn	Nathan Fillion, Elizabeth Banks, Gregg Henry	United States	
Snakes on a Plane	David R. Ellis	Samuel L. Jackson, Julianna Margulies, Nathan Phillips	United States	
Snakes on a Train	Peter Mervis	A.J. Castro, Shannon Gayle, Isaac Wade	United States	
S.S. Doomtrooper	David Flores	Corin Nemec, Ben Cross, James Pomitcher	United States	Television film
Stay Alive	William Brent Bell	Jon Foster, Samaire Armstrong, Frankie Muniz	United States	
Stump the Band	JoJo Henrickson, William Holmes	Becky Boxer, Carl Ciarfalio, Dominique Davalos	United States	
The Texas Chainsaw Massacre: The Beginning	Jonathan Liebesman	Jordana Brewster, Taylor Handley, Diora Baird	United States	
Them	David Moreau, Xavier Palud	Olivia Bonamy, Michaël Cohen, Adriana Mocca, Maria Roman, Camelia Maxim	France	
They Must Eat	Tommy Brunswick	Dwayne Roszkowski, Erick Adam, Dr. Rudy Hatfield	United States	
This Hollow Sacrament	Greg Stechman	Anthony Falcon, Ryan Pratton, John Geckler	United States	
Tiki	Ron Ford	Maria Caprille, Angela Dierdorff Petro, Wes Deitrick	United States	
To Let	Jaume Balagueró	Macarena Gómez, Adrià Collado, Nuria González	Spain	
To Sir, with Love	Im Dae-woong	Oh Mi-hee, Jang Seong-woon, Seo Young-hee	South Korea	
The Tooth Fairy	Chuck Bowman	Lochlyn Munro, Chandra West	United States	Direct-to-video
Trapped Ashes	Sean S. Cunningham, Joe Dante, John Gaeta, Monte Hellman, Ken Russell	Jayce Bartok, Scott Lowell, Lara Harris	Japan; United States	
Turistas	John Stockwell	Josh Duhamel, Melissa George	United States	
Underworld: Evolution	Len Wiseman	Kate Beckinsale, Sophia Myles, Zita Görög	United States	
Vindication	Bart Mastronardi	Henry Borriello, Zoë Daelman Chlanda, Raine Brown	United States	
Wages of Sin	Aaron Robson	Prentice Reedy, Emily Lucas, Ashlie Victoria Clark	United States	
The Wailer	Andrés Navia	Vanessa Rice, John Patrick Jordan, Hugo Medina, Brenda Mejia, Monique Barajas	United States	Direct-to-video
The Wedding Curse	Chito S. Roño	Kris Aquino, Claudine Barretto	Philippines	
When Evil Calls	Johannes Roberts	Jennifer Lim, Sean Pertwee, Dominique Pinon	United Kingdom	
When a Stranger Calls	Simon West	Camilla Belle, Thomas Flanagan, Katie Cassidy	United States	
Wicked Little Things	J. S. Cardone	Scout Taylor-Compton, Lori Heuring, Chloë Grace Moretz	United States	
The Wicker Man	Neil LaBute	Nicolas Cage	United States	Remake
Wilderness	Michael J. Bassett	Sean Pertwee, Lenora Crichlow, Stephen Don	United Kingdom	
Witchcraft 13: Blood of the Chosen	Mel House	Tim Wrobel, Zoe Hunter, Jennifer Lafleur	United States	
The Witches Hammer	James Eaves	Claudia Coulter, Stephanie Beacham, Magda Rodriguez	United Kingdom	
The Woods	Lucky McKee	Bruce Campbell, Emma Campbell, Marcia Bennett	United States	
Wrestlemaniac	Jesse Baget	Rey Misterio, Sr., Irwin Keyes, Leyla Milani	United States	
Zombie Night 2: Awakening	David J. Francis	Sharon DeWitt, Kari Grace, Tony Watt	Canada	Direct-to-video
