= Horror films of Europe =

Horror films in Europe

The horror films of Europe (generally referred to as Euro Horror) were described by Ian Olney in Euro Horror: Classic European Horror Cinema in Contemporary American Culture as often being more erotic and "just plain stranger" than their American counterparts. Horror cinema of the United Kingdom is viewed by some authors (e.g. Olney) as occupying a space between that of America and continental Europe, but the UK was involved in and produced many films regarded as Euro horror and is thus included in other analyses. European horror films draw from distinctly European cultural sources, including surrealism, romanticism, decadent tradition, early 20th century pulp-literature, film serials, and erotic comics. Compared to the narrative logic in American genre films, these films focused on imagery, excessiveness, and the irrational.

The concept of European horror films as a unified style is often defined by British and American critics and fans rather than by continental Europeans. Academic David Hutchings found that they are reliant on notions of the exotic and the foreign, and that they are "a lot more exciting than whatever we have here, wherever here is." Hutchings said that there were two significant historical periods in European horror cinema, with the first period running from the mid-1950s to the mid 1980s where shortly after, production on these films was greatly diminished. The second being at the turn of the century. Between the mid-1950s and the mid-1980s, European horror films emerged from countries like Italy, Spain and France, and were shown in the United States predominantly at the drive-in theatre and grindhouse theatres. As producers and distributors all over the world were interested in horror films, regardless of their origin, changes started occurring in European low-budget filmmaking that allowed for productions in the 1960s and 1970s for horror films from Italy, France, Germany, the United Kingdom and Spain, as well as co-productions between these countries. Several productions, such as those in Italy, were co-productions due to the lack of international stars within the country. European horror films began developing strong cult following since the late 1990s. Since the year 2000, European horror cinema has undergone a major revival, with productions from France, Germany, Spain and the United Kingdom getting larger audiences and critical recognition.

== Austria ==
Jon Towlson in his book Global Horror Cinema Today (2021) said that Austria had little in a tradition of horror films in 20th century cinema, with only a few standalone films in the 21st century such as The Hands of Orlac (1924), Parapsycho – Spectrum of Fear (1975), and Angst (1983). While Towlson classified The Hands of Orlac as horror, Tony Rayns said the film was closer to pulp thrillers like Fritz Lang's Dr. Mabuse films. By the 1970s, Austria's film industry had hit an all-time low producing five to ten films a year, with many of them being sex comedy films co-produced with West Germany. There were no there were no horror film productions in Austria in the 1990s. Director Veronika Franz of the Austrian film Goodnight Mommy (2014) has said that "In Austria, there isn't much of a horror film tradition, Austria wanted to represent itself as an art film country. It was thought that horror films had no stories and were filled with clichés."

The first tentative horror film productions of the 21st century were described by Towlson as being based on the post-Scream (1996) wave of slasher films. These included Silent Bloodnight (2006), Dead in 3 Days (2006) and its sequel Dead in 3 Days 2 (2008). Dead in 3 Days became Austria's highest grossing film of 2006. Dead in 3 Days financial success led to the further production of films in the country such as Blood Glacier (2013), Swiss-Austrian co-production One Way Trip (2011), and Attack of the Lederhosen Zombies (2016) and The Dark (2018).

== France ==
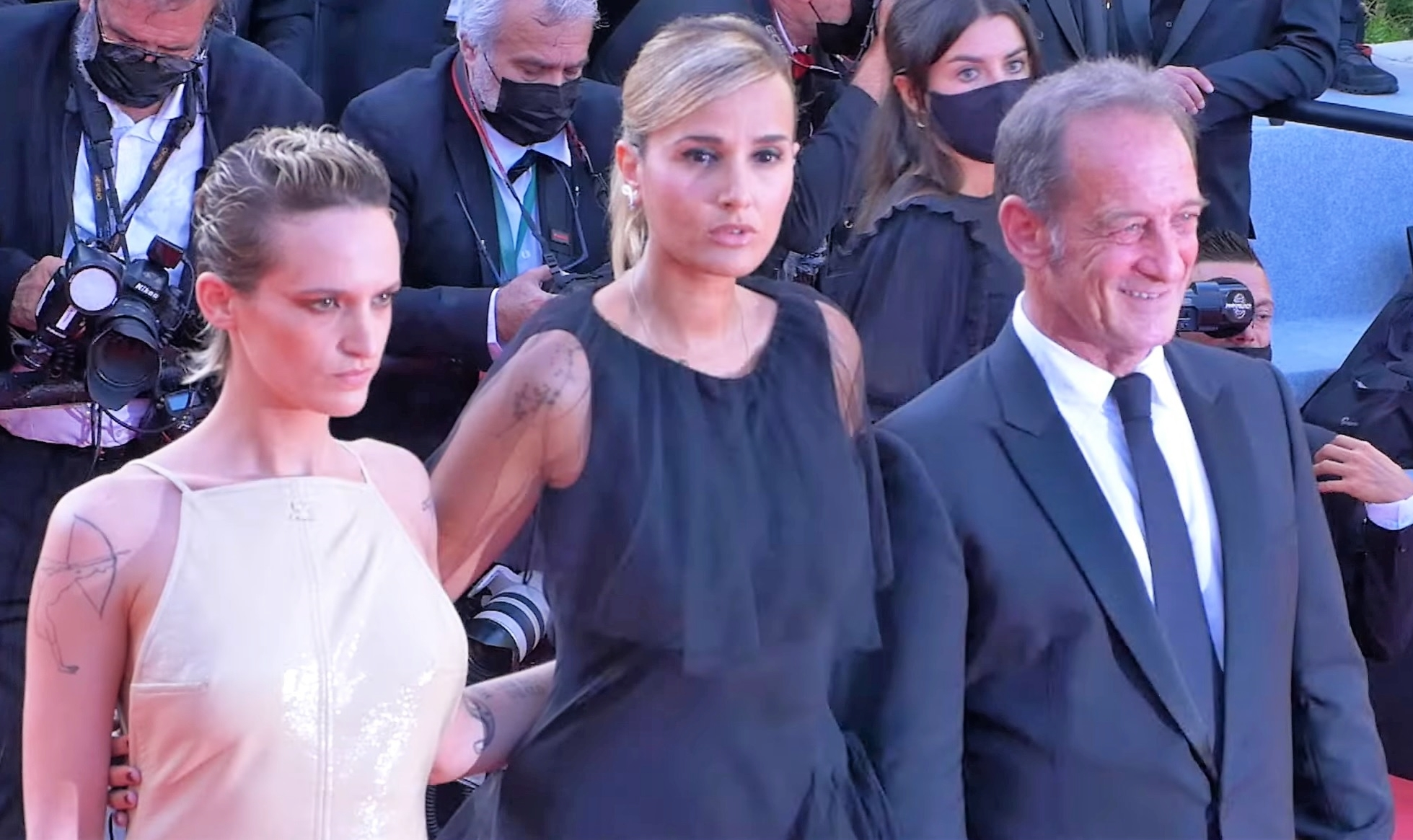
French director Julia Ducournau (centre) won the Palme d'Or for horror film Titane. She is pictured with actors Agathe Rousselle and Vincent Lindon, who star in the film, at the 2021 Cannes Film Festival.

France never truly developed a horror film movement to the volume that the United Kingdom or Italy had produced. In their book European Nightmares, editors Patricia Allmer, Emily Brick, and David Huxley noted that French cinema was generally perceived as having a tradition of the fantastic, rather than horror films. The editors noted that French cinema had produced a series of outstanding individual horror films, from directors who did not specialize in the field. In their book Horror Films, Colin Odell and Michelle Le Blanc referred to the director Jean Rollin as one of the country's most consistent horror auteurs with 40 years of productions described as "highly divisive" low budget horror films often featuring erotic elements, vampires, low budgets, pulp stories and references to both high and low European art. The works of Rollin or films like Eyes Without a Face (1960) are generally viewed as exceptions in a national film industry that was not known for producing horror films in the 20th century.

The development of explicit and violent French films had a small increase since the year 2000. A 21st-century movement of transgressive French cinema known as New French Extremity was named by film programmer James Quandt in 2004, who declared and derided that films of Catherine Breillat, Claire Denis, Gaspar Noé, and Bruno Dumont, among others, had made "cinema suddenly determined to break every taboo, to wade in rivers of viscera and spumes of sperm, to fill each frame with flesh, nubile, or gnarled, and subject it to all manner of penetration mutilation and defilement." In her book Films of the New French Extremity, Alexandra West described the phenomenon as initially an art-house movement, but as the directors of those films started making horror films fitting arthouse standards such as Trouble Every Day (2001) and Marina de Van's In My Skin (2002), other directors began making more what West described as "outright horror films" such as Aja's High Tension (2003) and Xavier Gens' Frontier(s) (2007). Some of these horror films of the New French Extremity movement would regularly place on "Best Of" genre lists, such as Martyrs (2008), Inside (2007) and High Tension (2003) while Julia Ducournau's film Titane (2021) won the Palme d'Or at the 2021 Cannes Film Festival. Academic David Pettersen described internationally successful films such as Raw (2016) or The Swarm (2020) were situated "somewhere between the poles of genre and art film, suggesting a distinctly hybridized relationship."

Few French 21st century horror films have performed well in their domestic box office, with only the film Deep in the Woods (2000) performing well with 740,000 tickets in France. The only post-2000 horror film as of 2021 to have more than 200,000 tickets sold in the local box office was Them (2006). French director Alexandre Aja said that "the problem with the French is that they don't trust their own language [when it comes to horror]. American horror movies do well, but in their own language, the French just aren't interested." Pettersen found that the most financially successful films that could be described as horror films were ones that mixed horror with other genres such as Brotherhood of the Wolf (2001), Vidocq (2001) and The City of Lost Children (1995).

== Germany ==
A film movement that appeared in Germany in the first half of the 1920s labeled the German expressionist film closely resembled the horror film. The term is borrowed from art groups such as Der Blaue Reiter and Der Sturm. These films feature sensationalist titles such as Warning Shadows (1923), The Cabinet of Dr. Caligari (1920) and Secrets of a Soul (1926). German film historian Thomas Elsaesser wrote that what was retained in popular film memory of these films were the characters who resembled bogeymen from children's fairy tales and folk legends. These included characters like the mad Dr. Caligari, Jack the Ripper from Waxworks (1924) and Count Orlok as well as actors like Conrad Veidt, Emil Jannings and Peter Lorre. Director F.W. Murnau, made an adaptation of Dracula with Nosferatu (1922). Newman wrote that this adaptation "stands as the only screen adaptation of Dracula to be primarily interested in horror, from the character's rat-like features and thin body, the film was, even more so than Caligari, "a template for the horror film."

German horror films remained marginal after the silent film era. The Third Reich ended the production of horror films and German productions never gained a mass audience leading the genre to not return in any major form until the late 1960s. Between 1933 and 1989, Randall Halle stated about only 34 films that could be described as horror films and 45 which were co-productions with other countries, primarily Spain and Italy. Among the first horror films from Germany following World War II were Alraune (1952) The Head (1959) and Horrors of Spider Island (1960) with The Head being one of the few German horror films to reach an American film market in the 1960s. Outside of Werner Herzog's Nosferatu the Vampyre (1979) most of these films were low-budget that focused on erotic themes over horrific turns in narrative.

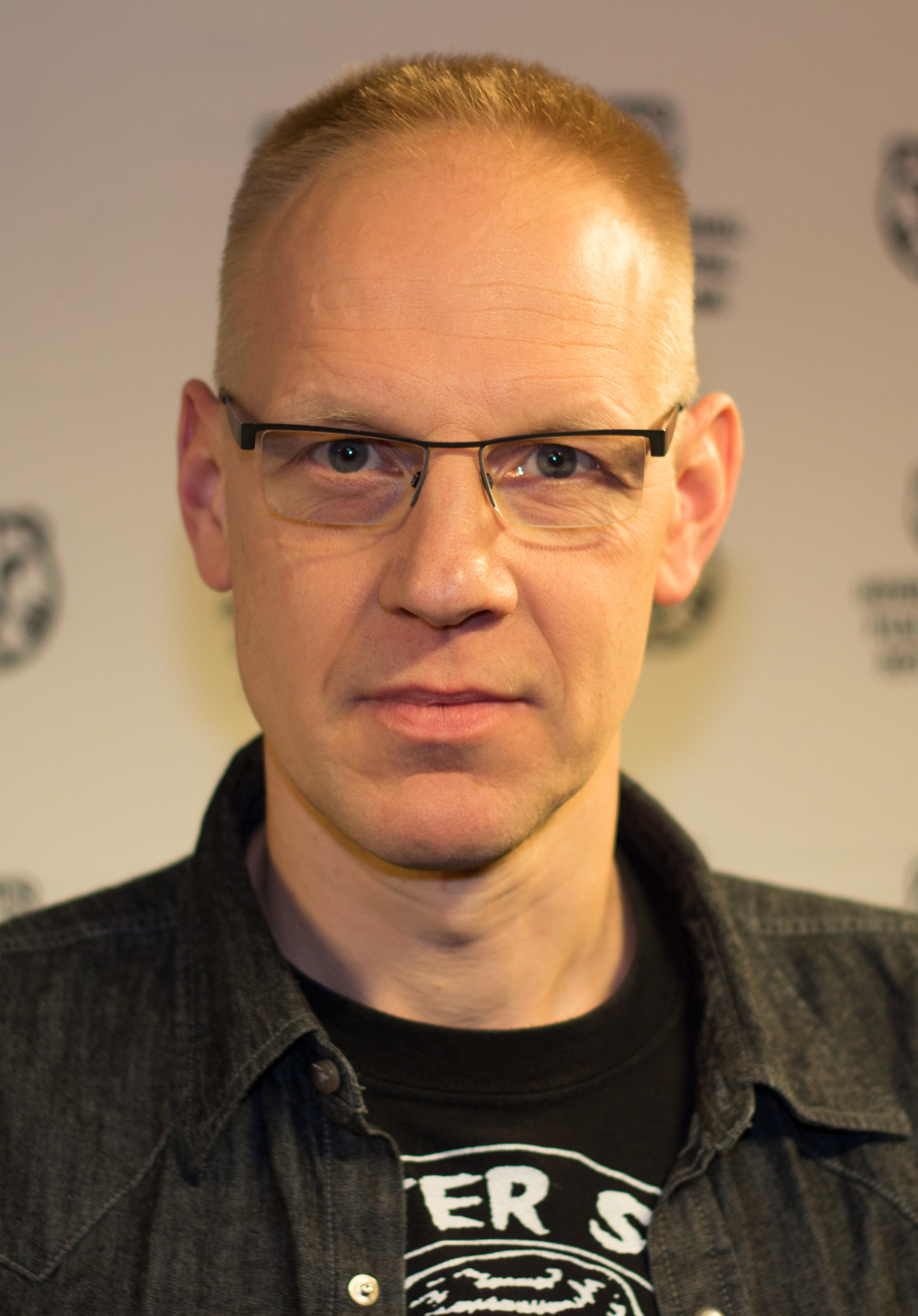
Jörg Buttgereit in 2015. Buttgereit was described by Kai-Uwe Werbeck as "arguably the most visible German horror director of the 1980s and early 1990s".

In the mid-1970s, Federal Department for Media Harmful to Young Persons was tasked with the protection of minors from violent, racist and pornographic content in literature and comic books which led to increased the code which became law in 1973. These laws expanded to home video in 1985 following the release of titles such as Sam Raimi's The Evil Dead (1981) and the political change when Helmut Kohl became chancellor in 1982. The amount of West German film productions were low in the 1980s, leaving the genre to be shot by amateurs with low-budget productions. In the early 1980s, West Germany's government cracked down on graphic horror films similar to the United Kingdom's Video nasty panic. A direct response to this led to West German independent directors in the late 1980s and early 1990s, West German indie directors to release a comparatively high number of what Kai-Uwe Werbeck described as low-budget "hyper-violent horror films" sometimes described as German underground horror. Werbeck described the most prominent of these were of Jörg Buttgereit, described by Werbeck as "arguably the most visible German horror director of the 1980s and early 1990s", one which Harald Harzheim claimed to be "the first German director since the 1920s to give the horror genre new impulses". Similar gory films such as Olaf Ittenbach's The Burning Moon was the first, and last film to be made in Germany that is still banned there as of 2016.

German horror films returned in what Werbeck described as a more "mainstream fashion" in the 21st century. This included the box office hit Anatomy (2000) and Antibodies (2005), who Odell and Le Blanc described as being a similar to the 1960s krimi genre of crime films. The second were films made for international markets such as Legion of the Dead (2001) and the video game adaptations directed Uwe Boll such as House of the Dead (2003) and Alone in the Dark (2005).

== Italy ==
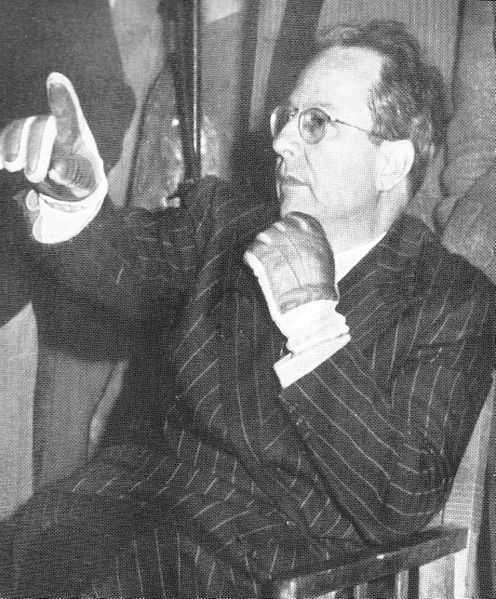
Director Riccardo Freda on the set of I Vampiri, the first Italian horror film of the sound era.

Early silent Italian fantastique films focused more on adventure and farce opposed to Germany's expressionism. The National Fascist Party in Italy had forced film in the early sound era to "spread the civilization of Rome throughout the world as quickly as possible." Another influence was the Centro Cattolico Cinematografico (Catholic Cinematic Centre) that was described by Curti as "permissive towards propaganda and repressive against anything related to sexuality or morality." The Vatican City's newspaper L'Osservatore Romano for example, critiqued the circulation of films like Bride of Frankenstein (1935) in 1940.

As Italian neorealism had monopolized Italian cinema in the 1940s, and as the average Italian standard for living increased, Italian critic and historian Gian Piero Brunetta stated that it would "appear legitimate to start exploring the fantastic." Italian film historian Goffredo Fofi echoed these statements, stating in 1963 that "ghosts, monsters and the taste for the horrible appears when a society that became wealthy and evolves by industrializing, and are accompanied by a state of well-being which began to exist and expand in Italy only since a few years" Initially, this was a rise in peplum films after the release of Hercules (1958). Italy started moving beyond peplums making Westerns and horror films which were less expensive to produce than the previous sword-and-sandal films.

Italy's initial wave of gothic horror films was rooted in popular cinema, and often involved co-productions with other countries. Curti described the initial wave of the 1960s Italian gothic horror allowed directors like Mario Bava, Riccardo Freda and Antonio Margheriti to helm what Curti described as "some of their very best works." Bava's Black Sunday (1960) was particularly influential. Many productions of this era were often written in a hurry, sometimes developed during filming production by production companies that often did not last very long, sometimes for only one film production. After 1966, the gothic cycle ended, primarily through a broader crisis that affected the Italian film industry with its audience rapidly shrinking. Some gothics continued to be produced into the beginning of the 1970s, while the influence of the genre was felt in other Italian genres like the Spaghetti Western. The term giallo, which means "yellow" in Italian, is derived from Il Giallo Mondadori, a long-running series of mystery and crime novels identifiable by their distinctive uniform yellow covers, and is used in Italy to describe all mystery and thriller fiction. English-language critics use the term to describe more specific films within the genre, involving a murder mystery that revels in the details of the murder rather than the deduction of it or police procedural elements. Tim Lucas deemed early films in the genre such as Bava's The Girl Who Knew Too Much (1963) while Curti described Blood and Black Lace (1964) as predominantly a series of violent, erotically charged set pieces that are "increasingly elaborate and spectacular" in their construction, and that Bava pushed these elements to the extreme which would solidify the genre. It was not until the success of Dario Argento's 1970 film The Bird with the Crystal Plumage that the giallo genre started a major trend in Italian cinema.

Other smaller trends permutated in Italy in the 1970s such as films involving cannibals, zombies and Nazis which Newman described as "disreputable crazes". In Italy entered the 1980s, the Italian film industry gradually moved towards making films for television. The decade started with a high-budgeted production of Argento's Inferno (1980) and with the death of Mario Bava, Fulci became what historian Roberto Curti called "Italy's most prominent horror film director in the early 1980s". Several zombie films were made in the country in the early 80s from Fulci and others while Argento would continue directing and producing films for others such as Lamberto Bava. As Fulci's health deteriorated towards the end of the decade, many directors turned to making horror films for Joe D'Amato's Filmirage company, independent films or works for television and home video. As European horror cinema has undergone a major revival in the 2000s, Italian productions also began making horror film productions, but without the wide audience or a critical recognition that films from France, Germany, Spain or the United Kingdom received. Except for a few films, most Italian horror productions in the first 15 years of the 21st century have not been theatrically released or featured in mainstream press discourse. Bruno Mattei was the only Italian horror filmmaker active since the 1970s and 1980s continuing to make exploitation films with any regularity or consistency, while Ivan Zuccon developed films cheaply, often costing only a few thousand dollars. Similarly, The Last House in the Woods (2006) was entirely self-funded by its director Gabriele Albanesi.

== Nordic countries ==
Only a few horror films have been made in the Nordic countries. Academic Gunnar Iversen said that outside silent era productions such as the Swedish film The Phantom Carriage (1921), the Swedish-Danish collaboration Häxan (1922) or Vampyr (1932) directed by the Danish director Carl Theodor Dreyer, horror films from Sweden and Denmark mostly consisted of low-budget exploitation films. Norway, Finland and Iceland produced almost no horror films until the 2000s. Iversen stated the lack of a horror film tradition in the Nordic countries had to do with government financing of film and strong censorship and a general ideological climate he described as "skeptical of or even hostile to genres like horror." Among the exceptions were what Iverson described as World War II, some monster movie productions made with the involvement of American producers were made such as the Swedish Invasion of the Animal People (1959) and the Danish Reptilicus (1961) and low budget horror and sexploitation films like the Danish film The Sinful Dwarf (1973) and the Swedish Thriller: A Cruel Picture (1973). Others have horror-like scenarios that are predominantly comedies such as the Norwegian film Something Completely Different (1985) or the Icelandic Spooks and Spirits (2013).

Since the 1990s, film policy in Nordic countries has increasingly embraced film as an industry, resulting in a larger number of different genre films. Along with more liberal censorship practices involving graphic violence, particularly in Sweden and Norway, a new market with films like the Danish production Nightwatch (1994). The film became a huge success, not only in Denmark, but internationally and in other Nordic countries. Fourteen years later, Lars von Trier made the film Antichrist (2009) that similarly explored boundaries between art film and horror as he had done in his television series The Kingdom (1994–1997).

Few horror films have been made in Finland such as The White Reindeer (1952) and the horror and comedy hybrid The Moonlight Sonata (1988). In 2008, two Finnish horror films premiered with Dark Floors (2008), featuring the band Lordi and was one of the most expensive feature films made in Finland and was not a success in the box office. The second was Sauna an art and horror film hybrid similar to Antichrist, which Iverson described both as being exploring subjective states and Nordic history.

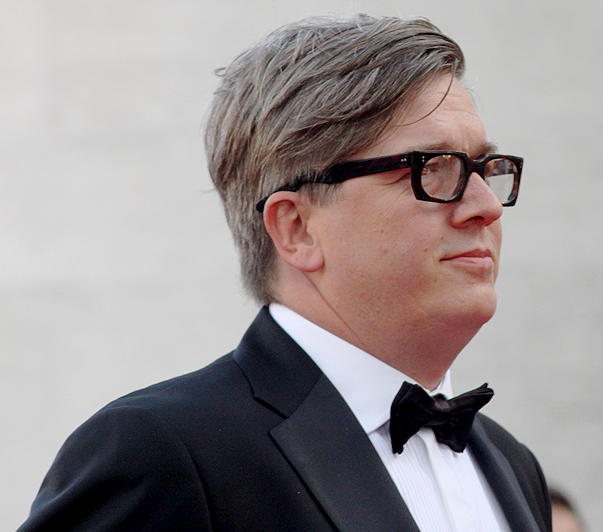
Tomas Alfredson, director of Let the Right One In (2008), the film that academic Gunnar Iversen described in 2016 as the most popular and successful of any Swedish horror films of the 21st century.

Norway had only produced two films Iversen said could be described as horror in the 20th century, the first being Lake of the Dead (1958) and Island of Darkness (1997). In comparison, at least 12 horror films have been produced in Norway between 2003 and 2013, many which were financial successes. The first film of the 21st century horror boom was Dark Woods (2003) which was followed by Cold Prey (2008) which received two sequels and Manhunt (2008). Films received what Iversen described as "a new level" with the international box office success of Dead Snow (2009). With the exception of the films of Pål Sletaune, Norwegian horror films always take place outside urban areas.

Charlotte Wiberg writing for the Swedish Film Database in 2017 that Sweden has produced approximately 60 to 70 horror films. Between The Phantom Carriage and Ingmar Bergman's Hour of the Wolf (1968), Swedish horror films were primarily made by director Arne Mattsson such as Mördaren – En helt vanlig person (1967). Wiberg referred to 1995 as a "watershed year" for Swedish horror with the release of the parody film Evil Ed (1995), which was followed by several horror films in varying budgets and what she described as "a love of the genre rather than any aspiration for critical acclaim." This included specific genre archetypes such as the zombie film Die Zombiejäger (2005) which went straight-to-video and the vampire film Frostbite (2006). While several horror films have been made in Sweden since the year 2000, Iverson said the most impactful, popular and successful was Let the Right One In (2008).

In Iceland, no horror films were made until 2009 with the film Reykjavik Whale Watching Massacre, which Iverson described as containing aspects of high and low culture using American slasher film elements in an Icelandic context of the countries 2008 financial collapse. Greenland also has only produced one horror film with Shadows in the Mountains (2011).

== Netherlands ==
It wasn’t until the 1980s that horror began to gain a visible place in Dutch cinema. Director Dick Maas was central in this movement with films like The Lift (1983) and Amsterdamned (1988).

The Vanishing (1988) directed by George Sluizer, is often cited as an influential work within Dutch horror, despite the absence of traditional horror motifs.

The 1990s produced fewer horror films such as The Johnsons (1992), directed by Rudolf van den Berg. became a landmark.

After a period of relative silence, Dutch horror returned in the 2000s and 2010s with greater variety. Films such as Woensdag (2005), Doodeind (2006), Slaughter Night (2006) and Two Eyes Staring (2010 )embraced psychological terror and supernatural themes, while Maas once again stirred controversy with Sint (2010), a gleefully blasphemous reimagining of Sinterklaas as a murderous ghost. Horror also reached younger audiences with Gruesome School Trip, based on the book series by Paul van Loon.

At the same time, Dutch director Tom Six shocked the international horror world with 2009's The Human Centipede. Unlike the myth-driven or slasher-inspired films of his contemporaries, Six’s movie embraced grotesque body horror and extreme imagery. Though condemned by many critics for its disturbing premise, it became a cult phenomenon, spawning two sequels and cementing its place in horror history as one of the most notorious films ever produced in the Netherlands.

By the mid-2010s, Dutch horror began to attract international attention. The Windmill Massacre (2016) exported the imagery of the Dutch landscape into a supernatural slasher narrative, while Prey (2016), about a lion terrorizing Amsterdam, showcased Maas’s continued interest in combining spectacle with horror comedy. Moloch returned to the eerie traditions of folklore and the haunted peat bogs of the north, signaling a renewed interest in atmosphere and myth.

== Spain ==
The highest point of production of Spanish horror films took place during late Francoism, between 1968 and 1975, a period associated with the so-called Fantaterror, the local expression of Euro Horror, identifiable for its "disproportionate doses of sex and violence". During this period, several Spanish filmmakers appeared with unique styles and themes such as Jesús Franco's The Awful Dr. Orloff (1962), first internationally successful horror and exploitation film production from Spain. Dr. Orloff would appears in other films of Franco's during the period. Paul Naschy, the actor and screenwriter., and Amando de Ossorio with his zombie like medieval knights in Tombs of the Blind Dead (1972). These directors adapted established monsters from popular films, comics and pulp fiction and imbued them with what Lazaro-Reboll described as "certain local flavour and relevance." A partial overview of films from this era focused on classic monsters (Frankenstein's Bloody Terror (1968), Dr. Jekyll y el Hombre Lobo (1972)) and films that grew from trends created by Night of the Living Dead and The Exorcist (The Living Dead at the Manchester Morgue (1974), Exorcismo (1975)). Most films of the period were low-budget films with short shooting schedules, while occasional films had respectable budgets such as 99 Women (1969) and others that had art house directors attempt commercial production such as Vicente Aranda's The Blood Spattered Bride and Jorge Grau's Bloody Ceremony (1973) Antonio Lazaro-Reboll wrote in 2012 that in the last forty years, the horror film has formed as a significant part of Spain's local transnational filmic production, that created its own auteurs, stars and cycles. For decades, it was described by Beck and Rodríguez-Ortega in Contemporary Spanish Cinema and Genre that the view of the genre has been "almost exclusively been constructed negatively" and that the rise in horror film productions in the late 1960s and 1970s in Spain was "reviled by contemporary critics, film historians and scholars". In his 1974 book Cine español, cine de subgéneros, author Román Gurbern saw contemporary Spanish horror films as "derivative of Authentic American and European traditions" that will "never make it into the histories of Spanish cinema, unless it is dealt with in a succinct footnote."

Film production decreased dramatically in the late 1970s and 1980s for several reasons, including the boom in historical and political films in Spain during the early years of democracy. The film legislation implemented by general director of cinematography Pilar Miró in 1983 introduced a selective subvention system, causing the overall number of annually made films (including horror films) to shrink, thereby dealing a heavy blow to the horror industry and the Fantaterror craze. In addition, there were changing habits on audiences and the visual material they sought. It was not until the late 1990s and the 2000s that Spanish horror reached another production peak.

After the success of private television operator Canal+ from the 1990s onward investing in the production of films by the likes of Álex de la Iglesia (The Day of the Beast; 1995) or Alejandro Amenábar (Tesis; 1996 and The Others; 2001) through Sogecine, other television companies such as Antena 3 and Telecinco (through Telecinco Cinema) came to see horror as a profitable niche, and the genre thereby became a successful formula for box-office hits in the 2000s, underpinning the wider switch in the industry from the largely State-dependent model of the 1980s to the hegemony of mass media holdings in domestic film production. Jaume Balagueró's The Nameless (1999), which became a popular film both in Spain and abroad, paved the way for new Spanish horror films. Filmax tried to capitalise on the success of the former film by creating the Fantastic Factory genre label and eventually came to develop one of the most successful Spanish film franchises with the Rec film series. The success of Juan Antonio Bayona's The Orphanage (2007) ensued with the release of ersatz gothic films featuring creepy children. Other key names for the development of the genre in the 21st-century Spanish industry include Juan Carlos Fresnadillo and Paco Plaza.

== United Kingdom ==
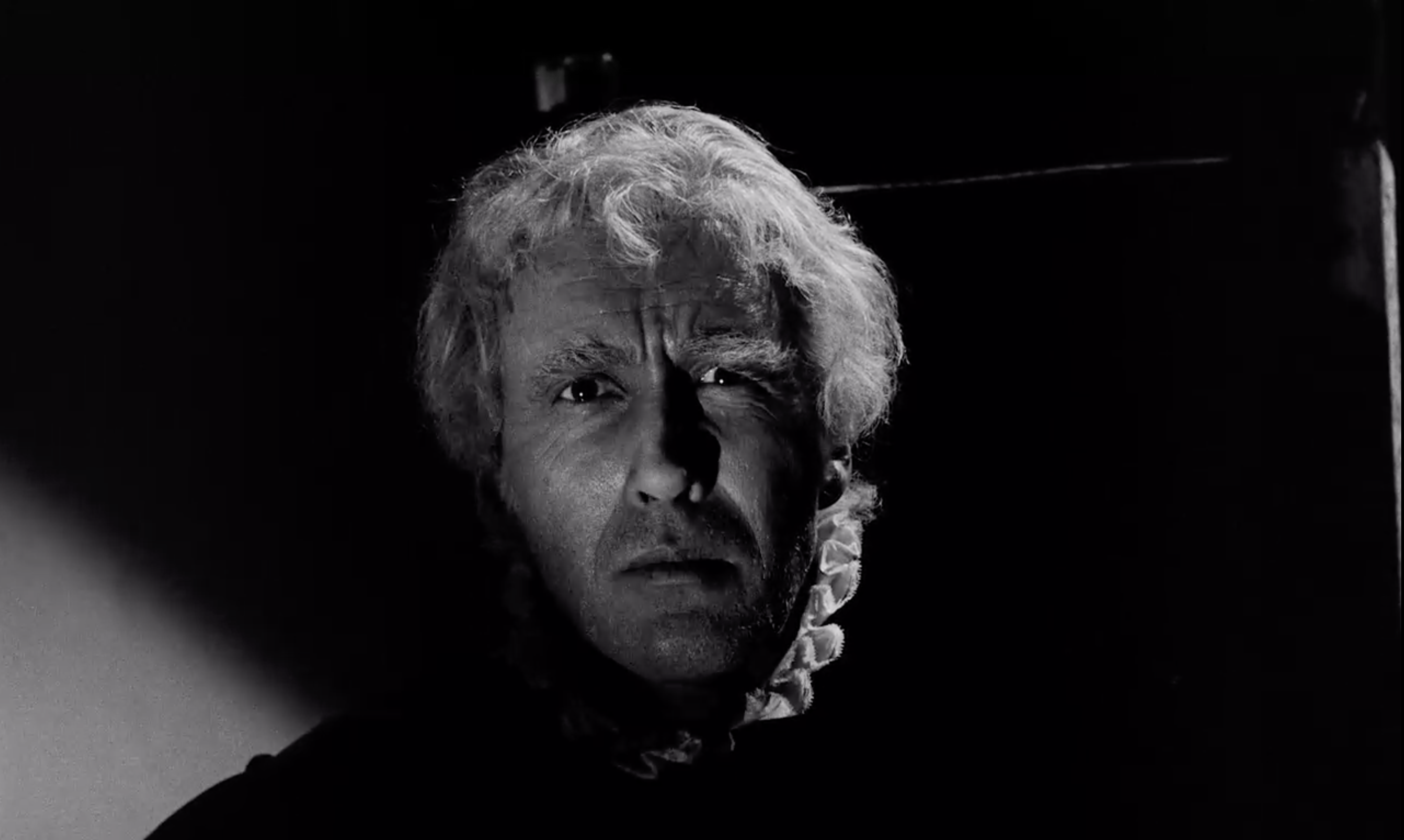
Christopher Lee in the Italian film Katarsis (1963). British actors and film crew would often work in European horror film productions outside of the United Kingdom between the mid-1950s and mid-1980s.

David Hutchings wrote that studies of European horror films tend to not include British film productions. In the 2007 book 100 European Horror Films published by the British Film Institute, Russian horror film productions were included in the discussion, (Dark Waters (1993), Viy (1967), and Night Watch (2004)) while no British films were included. The editor of the book said that "Eurohorror", that generally involves films from post-1960s horror cinema that emanate from Italy, Spain France and to a lesser extent, Belgium, German and other European nations. Similarly, in Ian Olney's Euro Horror: Classic European Horror Cinema in Contemporary American Culture (2013), the author found that "there are certain shared formal and narrative characteristics that set classic European horror films apart from contemporaneous British and American horror movies". Hutchings said that "for reasons that are never really made clear" British horror is generally discussed outside of the context of European horror films as they "lack the transgressive delights of continental European horror films."

Hutchings said that following the release of The Curse of Frankenstein (1957), continental European horror films drew from their British counterparts by casting British actors such as Christopher Lee in German, Italian and Spanish horror films. Directors from the United Kingdom would also work in continental European film productions in the 1960s and 1970s, such as Michael Reeves, Terence Fisher and Freddie Francis.

Hutchings found the second cycle of British horror films released at the turn of millennium "fit much more comfortably with the rest of the European horror". He said this is seen in the number of co-productions with continental European countries were "generally more European-facing" with films like Creep (2004), Dog Soldiers (2002), and Resident Evil (2002). He continued that these early 21st century British horror films drew influence from both American and continental Europe with films like Shaun of the Dead (2004), The Descent (2005), and Eden Lake (2008). Other British film productions, make direct reference to the continental works as being key to the plot, such as Berberian Sound Studio (2012).
