= Fuck Love =

Fuck Love may refer to:

- F*ck Love, a 2020 mixtape by the Kid Laroi
- F*ck Love (film), a 2019 Dutch romantic comedy
- "Fuck Love" (song), a 2017 song by XXXTentacion featuring Trippie Redd
- "Fuck Love", a song by All That Remains from the 2018 album Victim of the New Disease
- "Fuck Love", a song by Banks from the 2022 album Serpentina
- "Fuck Love", a song by Iggy Azalea from the 2014 album The New Classic
