= Remake (disambiguation) =

A remake is a film or television series based on an earlier produced work.

Remake may also refer to:

- Remake (2003 film), a Bosnian war film directed by Dino Mustafić
  - Remake (soundtrack), a soundtrack album from the film
- The Remake, a 2006 American slasher film directed by Tommy Brunswick
- Remake (novel), a 1995 science fiction novel by Connie Willis
- Remake (2025 film), an American documentary film
- Remake, a type of computing clone that recreates old or discontinued products
