= F*ck Love Too =

2022 Dutch film by Appie Boudellah and Aram van de Rest

- Dutch: F*ck de liefde 2
- Directed by: Appie Boudellah; Aram van de Rest
- Written by: Shariff Nasr; Sergej Groenhart; Appie Boudellah; Mustapha Boudellah
- Produced by: Adel Boudellah; Appie Boudellah; Mustapha Boudellah; Evert van de Grift
- Starring: Bo Maerten; Geza Weisz; Yolanthe Cabau; Maurits Delchot; Edwin Jonker; Victoria Koblenko
- Cinematography: Bart Beekman
- Music by: Denzel Chain; Anthony Micheal
- Production company: AM Pictures
- Distributed by: Netflix
- Release date: 20 May 2022 (Worldwide)
- Running time: 92 minutes
- Country: Netherlands
- Language: Dutch

F*ck Love Too (Dutch: F*ck de liefde 2) is a 2022 Dutch romantic comedy film directed by Appie Boudellah and Aram van de Rest. It is the sequel to the 2019 film F*ck Love and was released on Netflix on 20 May 2022.

== Premise ==
After a breakup, Lisa returns to the Netherlands, only to find out that her friend Kiki is getting married. The girls travel to Ibiza for Kiki's bachelorette and find themselves navigating romantic flings among an ensemble cast.

== Cast ==
- Bo Maerten as Lisa
- Geza Weisz as Jim
- Yolanthe Cabau as Bo
- Maurits Delchot as Said
- Edwin Jonker as Jack
- Victoria Koblenko as Cindy
- Nienke Plas as Kiki
- Bettina Holwerda as Angela
- Alex van der Zouwen as Max
- Defano Holwinjn as Johnny
- Anouk Maas as Monica
- Dorian Bindels as Noah
- May Sampers as Javier
- Aram van de Rest as Ferry
- Omari Komproe as Souf
- Aimee Neira Ashruf as Saar

== Reception ==
F*ck Love Too was universally panned by critics, who cited the film's predictability, artificiality, and lack of chemistry between the actors.
