= Slaughter Night =

- Directed by: Frank van Geloven; Edwin Visser
- Written by: Edwin Visser; Frank van Geloven
- Produced by: Martin Lagestee
- Starring: Victoria Koblenko; Jop Joris; Kurt Rogiers
- Cinematography: René Haan; Jan Vrints
- Edited by: Frank van Geloven; Edwin Visser
- Music by: Habbo Beem
- Production companies: BE-FILMS; Lagestee Film BV
- Distributed by: High Point Film and Television
- Release date: 5 October 2006
- Running time: 90 minutes
- Countries: Netherlands; Belgium
- Language: Dutch

Slaughter Night (Dutch: Slachtnacht, stylised as Sl8n8) is a 2006 Dutch-Belgian horror film written and directed by Edwin Visser and Frank van Geloven. It stars Victoria Koblenko, Jop Joris and Kurt Rogiers.

== Plot ==
Eighteen-year-old Kristel survives a car accident in which her father dies. Tormented by nocturnal visions she continues her father's investigation of serial killers – especially Andries Martíns, a child killer. She decides to visit an abandoned mine, with a little group of friends from college, where her father headed the investigations on Andries. In the dark, abandoned mine shafts, convicted murderers used to be used as 'firefighters' to detect explosives, which was a job that normally nobody survived.

When the group arrives at the mine, the shaft lift suddenly drops 60 metres. The students must now find a way out of the dilapidated mine maze but they are not alone. The spirit of Martins is more bloodthirsty than ever. Kristel and her friends spend the night in the mine but the trip becomes more and more of a nightmare and a battle for survival.

== Cast ==
- Victoria Koblenko as Kristel Lodema
- Jop Joris as Paul
- Kurt Rogiers as Mark
- Carolina Dijkhuizen as Liesbeth
- Lara Toorop as Susan
- Steve Hooi as Ruud
- Serge-Henri Valcke as Louis Corpus
- Linda van der Steen as Estrild
- Emiel Sandtke as Stefan
- Martijn Oversteegen as Martin Lodema
- Liz Snoyink as Carla Lodema
- Michaël van Buuren as Toine
- Hans Ligtvoet as Vital Houcks
- Robert Eleveld as Andries Martiens
- Rutger Lagestee as Jonge martiens
- Geena Maas as Anna
- Teun Lagestee as Jochem
- Kris van Veelen as Agent
- Paul Wuijts as Opzichter
- Marjan Lammers as Moeder Martiens
- Jeroen Planting as Vader martiens
- Vincent Gerris as Agent
- Eva-Marijn Stegemann as Scholiere
- Theu Boermans as Gaston
- Harrie Wiessenhaan as Vrachtwagenchauffeur

== Production ==
The production, script and direction were made by Frank van Geloven and Edwin Visser, who worked five years on the project. Victoria Koblenko made in this film his third appearance in a horror film and was promptly appointed to the Dutch scream queen of horror. A small part of the team that created the special effects for The Lord of the Rings, worked on this film and made the Make-up effects. The Amsterdam company UNREAL, specializes in visual effects, such as Special Effects Makeup, Props and Special Realistic Dummies has created the FX effects.

== Release ==
The film premiered alongside Doodeind and Horizonica at the Dutch Film Festival on 5 October 2006. The film attracted 12,065 cinema admissions, according to figures from the Netherlands Association of Film Distributors (NVF). It had its Canadian premiere on 24 October 2006 as part of the Toronto After Dark Film Festival and was presented at the European Film Market on 10 February 2007. The film came in a box set along with Sheitan and Carved.

== Soundtrack ==
The opening title was the 1974 hard rock song "Love Me Like a Lion" from BZN.
