= Bonesaw (film) =

- DVD cover
- Directed by: Jett Blakk
- Written by: Jett Blakk
- Based on: Saw by James Wan and Leigh Whannell
- Produced by: Jeremy Spencer
- Starring: Bobby Williams; Jason Tiya; Mark Galfione; Kyle Lewis; Joey Milano; Brett Matthews; Ty Hudson; Brandon Irons
- Cinematography: Jett Blakk
- Edited by: Ann Igma
- Music by: S.E.A.
- Production company: Adonis Pictures
- Distributed by: Adonis Pictures
- Release date: April 2006 (United States)
- Running time: 94 minutes
- Country: United States
- Language: English

Bonesaw is a 2006 American gay pornographic horror film written and directed by Jett Blakk. It is based on the 2004 horror film Saw by James Wan and Leigh Whannell.

== Plot ==
A woman returns home from grocery shopping, and has her throat slit by a masked serial killer known as "Bonesaw". Elsewhere, a man named Lee wakes up in Bonesaw's warehouse, and is informed via closed-circuit televisions and the building's sound system that he must win his freedom by surviving a series of intellectual and physical challenges; an ankle monitor that is capable of delivering electric shocks is used to ensure Lee's compliance.

Lee's first test involves two fellow captives, one of whom can only lie, while the other can only tell the truth. The two men are forced to have sex in front of Lee, who uses his one allotted question to correctly discern the identities of the duo. While Lee moves on to the next challenge, Bonesaw shoots one of the men and knocks the other out while declaring, "I still need you."

Pat Roberts, a self-proclaimed psychic, calls the Wannell County Police Station to report his precognitive flashes of Bonesaw's murders, but his visions are dismissed by the skeptical Detective Brown.

Bonesaw's next game involves a caged man who will be released if Lee can solve at least two out of three brain teasers. Lee correctly answers only a single question, but is given a second chance to free the hostage, one that involves bringing the man to orgasm in less than fifteen minutes. Lee is unable to make the man ejaculate in time, and is forced to leave him behind as the room fills with toxic gas.

Pat Roberts meets with Detective Brown in person, and attempts to convince him to investigate an address that he claims is Bonesaw's hideout. Brown instead kicks Roberts out, and has sex with another detective named Larson. Afterward, Larson suggests that Brown look into the address that Roberts provided, explaining that Roberts's "gift" once helped the LAPD close a homicide case.

For his final challenge, Lee must make two men, both of whom are handcuffed to a pole, orgasm in less than twenty minutes, and do it without stepping outside of a circle that has been drawn on the floor. Lee wins the game, and is allowed to leave by Bonesaw, who kills the other two men with a handgun and a circular saw while deadpanning, "I said you'd go scot-free, not them".

Brown and Larson reach the warehouse and shoot Bonesaw, unmasking the figure afterward to reveal that it was actually the surviving hostage from Lee's initial challenge, disoriented, gagged, and framed by the real Bonesaw. As Brown laments that he should have listened to Patrick Roberts earlier, a puzzled Larson mentions that Roberts is not a man, but a woman (the one murdered in the intro) whose full given name is Patricia.

A series of flashbacks reveal that both Bonesaw and the impostor Pat Roberts are really James, an ex-boyfriend of Lee's. James locates, comforts, and takes the oblivious Lee to safety, which spurs Lee into asking that they get back together, a request that a smirking James obliges.

== Cast ==
- Bobby Williams as Lee
- Jason Tiya as Detective Brown
- Mark Galfione as Detective Larson
- Kyle Lewis as Pole Man #1
- Joey Milano as Pole Man #2
- Brett Mathews as Caged Man
- Ty Hudson as Danny
- Brandon Irons as Danny's Lover
- Tina Tyler as Patricia Roberts
- Rob Romoni as James/Bonesaw

== Release ==
Upon being released in 2006, Bonesaw was rejected by distributors of content for pay-per-view hotel channels due to being deemed "too violent".

== Reception ==
XCritic praised the film, categorizing it as "recommended" and writing, "Adonis Productions has released another quality disc with Bonesaw. The production values are high with professional videography, editing, music, and a variety of handsome dudes that cover an age range of early twenties to mid forties: all sexy". A similarly positive response to the film was by Rancho Carne, who wrote, "Certainly an unusual porn video, Bonesaw is destined to become a gay classic. Its combination of horror, suspense, huge cocks, hunky men, and tight assholes serves up something for everyone. At least, everyone who is interested in steamy, man-on-man sex. While the production values lean toward gore a bit more than desirable, this video somehow escapes cheesiness and deserves a round of kudos".

Wes Collins of GayVN, who awarded Bonesaw a score of 3/5, commended the sex scenes, but was critical of the horror elements, opining that the film was "likely too bloody for general appeal" and that "watching a model get butchered with a saw right after he gets off is a definite turn-off". A 2/5 was awarded by Giacomo Tramontagna of The Guide, who was similarly critical of Bonesaw, stating, "To get away with this kind of carnage in gay adult video, more wit is required than perpetrator Jett Blakk is able to inject".

According to GayVN contributor Mickey Skee, Saw co-creator Leigh Whannell expressed to him awareness of both Bonesaw and fellow gay parody Rammer, quipping, "You know you've made it big when they spoof you in porn".

Rob Romoni and Jett Blakk were nominated for Best Non-Sex Performance and Best Screenplay, respectively, at the 2007 Grabby Awards.
