= Woensdag =

2005 film

- DVD released by Arts Home Entertainment
- Directed by: Bob Embregts; Jean-Paul Arends
- Written by: Jean-Paul Arends
- Produced by: Bob Embregts; Jean-Paul Arends
- Starring: Reine Rek; Cêfas Hoofs; Corne Heyboer; Sjanett de Geus; Nadia Huffmeijer; Marisa Goedhart; Ronald van den Burg; William van der Voort
- Cinematography: Bob Embregts; Peter Schrijvers
- Edited by: Bob Embregts
- Music by: Ruud Jolie; Jorg van Beers
- Production company: Asura Pictures
- Distributed by: Arts Home Entertainment
- Release date: 15 June 2005 (Amsterdam Fantastic Film Festival)
- Running time: 75 minutes
- Country: Netherlands
- Language: Dutch

Woensdag (English: Wednesday) is a 2005 Dutch horror film written and directed by Bob Embregts and Jean-Paul Arends.

== Plot ==
Eight people are chosen to compete on Camp Slasher, a new horror-themed game show in which the contestants must complete challenges while trying to avoid a masked killer, one who is based on a local urban legend. Unbeknownst to the cast and crew of the show, an actual homicidal maniac resides in the woods where they have decided to shoot, and after massacring the program's behind-the-scenes personnel, he sets his sights on the competitors.

== Cast ==
- Marisa Goedhart as Vera de Jong
- Ronald van den Burg as Erik Faber
- William van der Voort as Matthijs van Weert
- Sjanett de Geus as Leanne Beekveld
- Cêfas Hoofs as Tom Cranen
- Reine Rek as Marieke Ouwerling
- Nadia Huffmeijer as Jeniffer Moonen
- Corne Heijboer as Kevin van Noordhof
- Laura Molenaar as Reizend Meisje
- Frans van der Meer as Presentatie
- Debby de Brouwer as Presentatie
- Marq van Broekhoven as Televisie Operator
- Ruud Jolie as Internet Operator
- Toine Schuurman as Assistant Techniek
- Theunis van den Broek as Nepmoordenaar #1
- Jeroen van Gelderblom as Nepmoordenaar #2
- Fred Sibelink as Producent Camp Slasher
- Patrice van der Linden as Moordenaar

== Reception ==
Bloody Disgusting praised the gore, criticized the screenplay and acting, and gave the film a final score of 3/5, concluding, "Woensdag may not be a great movie but it sure is entertaining and it being a relatively short movie (75 minutes) helps keep the pace and our attention up". The acting, dialogue, story, and production values were all panned by Neerlands Filmdoek, which gave Woensdag a grade of 1½ while also conceding that, "Nevertheless, there is still something to enjoy for lovers who have no objection to these shortcomings; the film is never boring and has enough amusing horror moments, fitted with the necessary gore". Top of the Flops gave Woensdag a similar commendation, noting that despite the drawbacks inherent in it being a "semi amateurish production" the film was still enjoyable as something "designed by enthusiasts for enthusiasts". Horror Neerlands, which gave the film a final grade of 2/5, panned the personality-less characters, the seemingly nonexistent script, and the slow start, but went on to admit that Woensdag did succeed at being "quite entertaining" and "still pretty fun" in spite of its flaws. The same score was awarded by Slasherpool, which summed Woensdag up with, "Disappointing slasher flick from the Netherlands which won't likely impress anyone who lives outside Holland. It's a very dull slasher and the concept has been done to death in several, much better flicks. It doesn't help that it's almost impossible to see what was going on for most of the movie either".
