= Mr. Jingles =

- DVD released by Lions Gate Entertainment
- Directed by: Tommy Brunswick
- Written by: Todd Brunswick
- Produced by: Todd Brunswick; Tommy Brunswick
- Starring: Kelli Jensen; Jessica Hall; John Anton; Nathanial Ketchum
- Cinematography: Todd Brunswick
- Edited by: Leo Pacman; Todd Brunswick
- Music by: T.J. James Souva
- Production companies: T&T Productions; Crossbow 5 Entertainment
- Distributed by: Lions Gate Entertainment
- Release date: August 29, 2006 (United States)
- Running time: 80 minutes
- Country: United States
- Language: English

Mr. Jingles is a 2006 American slasher film directed by Tommy Brunswick and written by Todd Brunswick. It was followed by a 2009 reboot titled Jingles the Clown.

== Plot ==
Young Angie Randall witnesses a spree killing clown named Mr. Jingles murder her parents, before he is shot to death by Officers Baines and Guinness. Before dying, Jingles tells Angie, "I'll be back for you!" The traumatized Angie is institutionalized until she is a teenager, at which point she is released into the care of her aunt Helen Jameson, and cousins Dylan and Heidi.

At the local cemetery, a visitor is killed by someone dressed as Jingles. Baines (who is now mayor) and Guinness are called to the graveyard by the man who found the body. The stranger tells them this is just the beginning, and reveals he knows that Baines and the police force (excluding Guinness) covered up the fact that Jingles was wrongly lynched and imprisoned when Angie's father and several others thought he tried to abduct Angie at her 4th birthday party, when in reality he had saved her from an actual child predator. After the three men leave, two of Dylan's delinquent friends are slain by Jingles while trying to steal his tombstone for a prank that they, Guinness' daughter Melanie, and a reluctant Dylan intend to play on Angie at a birthday party Heidi is setting up for her.

In his home, the stranger tells Guinness that he believes it is not a copycat, that Jingles has actually come back from the dead. The stranger (who reveals he was once employed at the penitentiary where Jingles was placed and witnessed the tortures inflicted on Jingles that drove him mad) presents occult objects that he found in Jingles' prison cell as evidence, prompting Guinness to remember that Jingles did chant something in a strange language as he lay dying. The two grab the items necessary to banish Jingles, who confronts them as they go to leave, killing the stranger, and wounding Guinness.

While Angie, Heidi, and Heidi's friends are partying in the Jameson house, Melanie dresses up like Jingles with the intent of crashing the celebration, only to be axed by the real Jingles. Jingles breaks in and kills Heidi, Dylan, and the rest of the revelers, leaving only Angie. An unknown amount of time later, Baines and two police officers enter the house, and find an hysterical Angie clutching Jingles' axes, making it appear as if she is the murderer. As she is being hauled away by a police officer, Angie is saved by Guinness, while Jingles attacks Baines and another officer.

== Cast ==
- Karen Turner as Mrs. Randall
- Dave Cunningham as James Randall
- Rudy Hatfield as Mr. Jingles
- Kelli Jansen as Angie Randall
- Chris Peters as Bill Guinness
- Tom Reeser as Mayor Baines
- Jon Manthei as Doctor Rudolph/Cop 1
- Nicole Majdali as Helen Jameson
- Kristin Reeser as Mayor's Assistant
- Doug Kolbicz as Chris
- Nathanial Ketchum as Dylan Jameson
- Heather Doba as Melanie Guinness
- Brian Zoner as Curtis
- Jessica Hall as Heidi Jameson
- John Anton as Stranger
- Michael Patrick Pilsner as Cemetery owner
- Novelle Neechi as Trisha
- Amber Whelan as Jen
- James Block as Parker
- Jacob Bailey as Rusty
- Jason Ryan as Jason
- Tommy Brunswick as Cop 2
- Shaun Buckley as Cameron (uncredited)

== Release ==
The film was released on DVD by Live/Artisan on July 18, 2006.

== Reception ==
Mr. Jingles received predominantly negative reviews upon its release, with many criticizing the acting, script, and poor production values. Scott Weinberg from DVD Talk gave the film one out of five stars, calling it "worthless", and further stated that every aspect of the film was poorly executed. Dread Central rated the film an abysmal score of zero out of five, offering similar criticism towards its poor execution, calling it "one of the worst direct-to-DVD horror films of all time".
