= F*ck Love (film) =

2019 Dutch film by Appie Boudellah and Lodewijk van Lelyveld

- Dutch: F*ck de liefde
- Directed by: Appie Boudellah; Lodewijk van Lelyveld
- Written by: Shariff Nasr; Appie Boudellah; Mustapha Boudellah
- Produced by: Adel Boudellah
- Starring: Bo Maerten; Thijs Römer; Yolanthe Cabau; Maurits Delchot; Edwin Jonker; Victoria Koblenko; Nicolette van Dam; Nienke Plas; Timor Steffens
- Cinematography: Max Maloney
- Edited by: Manuel Rombley
- Production companies: AM Pictures; Appelmoes Films
- Distributed by: Just Film Distribution
- Release date: 26 September 2019 (Netherlands)
- Running time: 96 minutes
- Country: Netherlands
- Language: Dutch

F*ck Love (Dutch: F*ck de Liefde) is a 2019 Dutch romantic comedy film directed by Appie Boudellah and Lodewijk van Lelyveld. It was followed by the 2022 Netflix sequel, F*ck Love Too.

== Premise ==
Lisa is going through a rocky divorce, and her friends take her to Curaçao to help take her mind off things.

== Cast ==
- Bo Maerten as Lisa
- Thijs Römer as Jim
- Yolanthe Cabau as Bo
- Maurits Delchot as Said
- Edwin Jonker as Jack
- Victoria Koblenko as Cindy
- Nicolette van Dam as Donna
- Nienke Plas as Kiki
- Timor Steffens as Daan
- Défano Holwijn as Johnnie
- Donald Scloszkie as Ray
- Soundos El Ahmadi as Rachida
- Omari Koemproe as Soufian
- Aimee Neira Ashruf as Saar
- Luc Plaizier as Peer
