= Victoria Koblenko =

Dutch actress, presenter and columnist

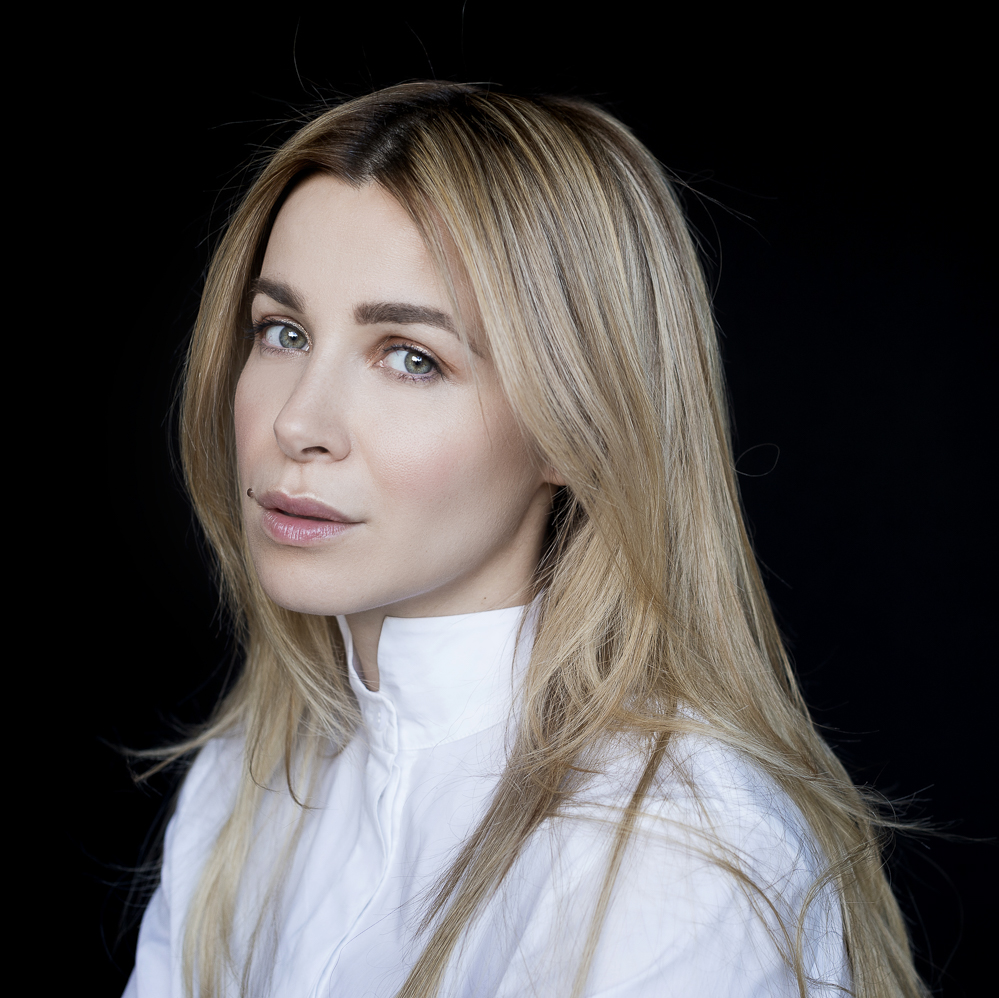
- Koblenko in 2018
- Born: Виктория Кобленко; 19 December 1980 (age 45); Vinnitsa, Ukrainian SSR, USSR
- Education: Leiden University
- Occupations: actress, presenter, columnist, humanitarian
- Years active: 2000–present
- Partner: Yevhen Levchenko
- Website: victoriakoblenko.nl

Victoria Koblenko (Ukrainian: Вікторія Кобленко, Russian: Виктория Кобленко; born 19 December 1980, in Vinnitsa, Ukrainian SSR) is a Dutch actress, presenter and columnist of Ukrainian descent.

== Early life and education ==
Koblenko was born and raised in Ukraine as an only child. At the age of twelve, she moved with her family to the Netherlands, where she attended gymnasium education (highest level of secondary education in the Netherlands) at Krimpenerwaard College from 1993 to 1999, where she mastered English, German and French, plus classical Latin and Greek. Koblenko is also fluent in Russian and Ukrainian as her native language, and Dutch as her second native language. She attended Leiden University between 1999 and 2008, where she obtained a BSc degree in Political Science in 2008. She also studied Russian science at the same university but did not finish this study.

Due to her background Koblenko is also regularly invited on talk shows of the national TV to explain political situations in Ukraine, as for example the Dutch referendum on the Association Agreement with Ukraine and the current Russo-Ukrainian War.

== Career ==
Although as a child Koblenko never entertained the ambition of becoming an actress one day, she was featured in several TV commercials in her early teens. Koblenko achieved stardom when she played Isabella Kortenaer in the Netherlands' most popular and longest-running TV soap opera, "Goede tijden, slechte tijden" ("Good Times, Bad Times"), from 2000 to 2010. Her first major film role was that of Marieke in the psychological thriller "Stille Nacht" (2004) which earned her the Favorite Actress Award at the 2004 edition of the Dutch Film Festival. The film was also enthusiastically received at the European Film Festival in Tuscany.

In August 2005, Koblenko was cast in the horror film "Doodeind" (2006). She also starred in the short film "American Dreams" (2006), playing the Russian wife of Lee Harvey Oswald. The film was shown at the International Film Festival Rotterdam and was named Best Short Film at the Hollywood Film Festival, which boosted her career even further. October 2006 saw the release of another film showcasing Koblenko's talents, the horror movie "Sl8n8". After several guest appearances in the TV series "Van Speijk" and "Boks", Koblenko played Kim van Meegen in the 12-part Dutch drama series "Vuurzee" ("Sea of Fire").

Drawing on her Eastern European background, she landed her first Russian-speaking role in TV series "Heritage". In 2009 she got her second Russian-speaking role in the TV series "Sisters" which aired on the 1st Channel in Russia.

In 2009 Koblenko started shooting for the first season Dutch TV drama series entitled "Bloedverwanten" ("Blood Relatives"). Koblenko played the role of Laura for 3 seasons which was first aired on AVRO in 2010.

In 2010 she starred in an on-line mockumentary called "Nigel & Victoria". In this series of eight short episodes, broadcast on YouTube, Koblenko played herself in the role of an on-camera spokesperson. She made her stage debut in September 2010 with the theatre play "Retour Hollandse Spoor" from the National Theatre directed by Johan Doesburg.

Production of the TV film "Van God Los" started March 2011. Koblenko played the part of Miranda. The film is directed by David Lammers for the BNN network. In 2012 another drama series voor BNN, "FEUTEN" has been filmed. Currently Koblenko is shooting a third season Dutch TV drama series entitled "Bloedverwanten" ("Blood Relatives").

Koblenko has appeared on several Dutch talk shows and entertainment programs, among them "The Weakest Link" and "Celebrity Mole". She keeps close tabs on global developments, writing a column for the daily newspaper "Trouw" and reporting on events in, for example, Uganda and Ukraine, where she also served as an election observer.

== Charitable work ==
Koblenko supports several humanitarian organizations, including Amnesty International and UNICEF. She took her involvement one step further when she teamed up with Doctors Without Borders to produce a TV documentary about AIDS in her native Ukraine. Another case in point is her visit to the site of the Chernobyl disaster, in her capacity of goodwill ambassador for a local organization. Koblenko has been working to raise awareness for the Millennium Development Goals.

== Filmography ==
=== Film ===
Year	Film	Role
2004	Stille Nacht	Marieke Kopermolen
2006	American Dreams	Marina
2006	Doodeind	Laura
2006	Sl8n8	Kristel Lodema
2011	Van God Los (telefilm)	Miranda
2012	De Club van Sinterklaas of het geheim van de Speelgoeddokter	Nicole
2015	The Paradise Suite	Ana
2015	Fashion Chicks	Victoria Wolff
2015	Huisvrouwen bestaan niet	Titia
2019	F*ck Love	Cindy
2019	Righetto	Ervira
2020	Life as It Should Be	Danielle
2022	F*ck Love Too	Cindy
2024	Juf Braaksel en de geniale ontsnapping	

=== Television ===
Year	Title	Role	Season	Broadcast facility
2005	Wie is... de Mol?	Participant	5	AVRO
2005	Shockdoc	Host	3	RTL 5
2005	Thuis	Host	1	Talpa
2006	Ranking The Stars	Panellid	1	BNN
2007–2008	Landroof	Host	2	VPRO
2008	De Uitlaatklep	Host	2	RTV Noord

=== Roles in television ===
Title	Season	Year	Role	Episode	Broadcastfacility
Goede tijden, slechte tijden	11-15, 20-	2000–2005, 2010-	Isabella Kortenaer	> 500	RTL 4
Costa! de Serie	1	2001	Quirine	1 episode	BNN
Het Glazen Huis	1	2004	Danielle	1 episode	RTL 4
Van Speijk	1	2006	Charmaine	9 episodes	Talpa
Boks	1	2006	Anke	2 episodes	Talpa
Sorry, Minister	1	2009	Ellen	1 episode	VPRO
Vuurzee	1	2009	Kim van Megen	12 episodes	VARA
Сёстры Королевы	1	2008-09	Лена	12 episodes	Channel One
Bloedverwanten I	1	2009–2010	Laura	12 episodes	AVRO
Bloedverwanten II	1	2011	Laura	10 episodes	AVRO
FEUTEN	1	2012	Anne Fleur	10 episodes	BNN
Bloedverwanten III	1	2013	Laura	10 episodes	AVRO
