= Doodeind =

2006 Dutch horror-thriller film

- Theatrical release poster
- Directed by: Erwin van den Eshof
- Written by: Nick Jongerius; Erwin van den Eshof
- Produced by: Steven de Jong; Nick Jongerius; Erwin van den Eshof
- Starring: Victoria Koblenko; Everon Jackson Hooi; Anniek Pheifer
- Cinematography: Bart Beekman
- Edited by: Nick Jongerius
- Music by: Erik Jan Grob
- Production companies: Icuri Productions; Montecatini Management; Steven de Jong Producties
- Distributed by: RCV Film Distribution
- Release date: 3 August 2006
- Running time: 90 minutes
- Country: Netherlands
- Language: Dutch
- Box office: $154,342

Doodeind ("Deadend") is a 2006 Dutch horror-thriller film written and directed by Erwin van den Eshof, it stars Victoria Koblenko, Everon Jackson Hooi and Anniek Pheifer.

== Storyline ==
Seven young adults—Chris, Sidney, Ben, Barbara, Laura, Joline and Tim—who were best friends as teenagers have planned a reunion and decide to go camping in the woods of Scotland. While sitting around the campfire, they are attacked by a pack of wild dogs that badly injure Sidney. Tim manages to scare the dogs off with a burning branch long enough for the others to get Sidney back to their van and hide from the dogs. They start the van, but in their hurry to escape, Tim drives into a tree. When they awaken, they discover that Sidney is bleeding to death, so they go off to look for help.

Chris discovers an old mansion and they hide from the dogs there and decide to wait until morning and call for rescue. it is not long before they start hearing strange noises coming from upstairs. Hoping someone's home who can help them, Chris and Tim go upstairs, but they find no one. Chris later goes up to the attic where he sees a shadow shivering in the corner of the room; when he approaches, he discovers that it is Tim, shaking in fear. Chris soon gets a strange vision of funeral pyres, dead people, and a scary-looking woman. When he suddenly sees that same woman appear as a ghost in front of him, he hustles Tim downstairs with him and they lock themselves in a room. Tim goes into shock, Chris and Tim's girlfriend Laura try to help him, and strange noises come from outside the room, and black fire seems to be coming through the walls, burning Joline alive. Unable to save Tim, Chris takes the lead and gets everyone out of the room to hide somewhere else.

While Sidney has a conversation with his sister Barbara about his girlfriend being pregnant, Joline's boyfriend Ben finds an old book that describes a story to a young girl named May, written by her mother, Mary McBaine, when they hear Tim screaming for help. Knowing he's dead, so could not be doing this, they realize that the house is haunted and someone's pretending to be Tim. Laura cannot block out her feelings and runs away to find Tim. The group splits up to find both Laura and a way out. Barbara is the next one to bump into the woman's ghost, who is revealed to be able to become corporal, and she sends Barbara a vision about her past. The others find Barbara in time and she seems to be all right; they take her back to Sidney, who is still doing fine.

Chris and Ben head out to find Laura and instead, once again come face-to-face with Mary. Ben saves Chris just in time and they hear strange noises coming from a small locked room next to the attic. They enter the dark tunnel, desperate to find a way out. Sidney and Barbara try to distract each other by singing and telling each other stories, until they see the black fire approaching them again. The light goes out and they see another corporal, more beautiful version of Mary. Suddenly the light comes on again and Barbara reaches out to the place where Mary was standing seconds ago. She gets another vision. Up in the attic, Laura finds Tim sitting in the corner, nude and black-eyed. He asks her why she left him when he was dying and she realizes that someone is possessing him. She's soon attacked by an unseen force and dies.

Meanwhile, Chris and Ben finally find a way out, only to discover another book in the basement that describes what happened to Mary. She used to live in the old mansion and was pregnant with her first baby. When she was out in the woods one day, she was attacked by two men who accused her of being a witch. They beat her up and took her unborn child. Heartbroken and unable to conceive again, Mary used black magic to get a baby. This brought a curse upon her and the house. After reading this, Chris and Ben are once again confronted by the black fire, which kills Ben like it killed Joline. Unable to cope with their friends' deaths, Chris and Sidney decide to deal with Mary once and for all and use Barbara to communicate with her. The fire starts coming back, and as Barbara is now possessed by Mary, Sidney decides to sacrifice himself so that his sister and Chris can be saved. Chris listens in horror to Sidney scream while he's burned alive, and soon realizes that the fire has now surrounded them. However, Barbara, as Mary, is able to control the fire, and she and Chris are able to walk through the house without being burned. Hearing her baby's scream, Mary approaches a door that they unable to open at first, and Chris discovers that it is the old nursery where Mary's baby used to sleep. The baby's scream gets louder and they follow the sound to the crib that stands in the middle of the room.

Barbara has another vision of Mary's past, and sees how Mary's devil child was locked in a closet that was set on fire by the parents of seven children whom the child had attacked earlier. This is how the black fire started that killed all the parents. Chris, meanwhile, opens the closet, and Barbara approaches it. She smiles, as Mary and her child are finally reunited. She is pulled into the closet that once again is set on fire, killing her. Heartbroken, Chris is about to give up when daylight appears: it is the next morning. Relieved he can finally escape, Chris makes his way to the front door, only to hear Mary's voice which tells him that, in order for the curse to be broken, 7 must be killed. The daylight disappears again, and the screen goes black, while the sound of the black fire approaching can be heard, followed by Chris' scream.

== Cast ==
- Everon Jackson Hooi as Chris
- Anniek Pheifer as Barbara
- Alwien Tulner as Marie Mc Baine
- Mads Wittermans as Sidney
- Aram van de Rest as Ben
- Victoria Koblenko as Laura
- Micha Hulshof as Tim
- Terence Schreurs as Joline
- Perla Thissen as Joline's mother
- Han Peekel as Han Peekel
- Noah MacIntosh as Chris' son
- Amber Teterissa as Chris' wife
- Kimberley Kleczka as May Mc Baine
- Régis Marquerink as Sidney's bandmember
- Jeroen Schippers as Sidney's bandmember
- Dennis Jansen as Sidney's bandmember
- Laurens de Waard as Sidney's bandmember
- Wietze Vink as Sidney's bandmember
- Barbara Karel as Sidney's girlfriend
- Esther Vermeer as Vulgus
- Bas Wijnen as Villager #1
- Femke Verhoeve as Villager #2
- Henk Oosterhof as Villager #3
- Maurice Snackers as Villager #4
- Suzan Abrahams as Villager #5
- Marloes van Benthem as Villager #6
- Wilma van de Hoef as Villager #7
- Cora van Rijswijk as Villager #8
- Marjolijn Zwakman as Villager #9
- Keanan Kleczka as Child #1
- Kaylan Kleczka as Child #2
- Nick Rivard as Child #3
- Tom Fischer as Child #4
- Iona Cummings as Child #5
- Rose Brennan as Child #6
- Henry Gerdes as Child #7
- Alex Kohnert as Child #8

== Production ==
The film was shot in October 2005 and is in collaboration with TMF in August 2006 was part of a contest, here premiered their own horror trailer, which won the contest. The trailer will be put on the bonus disc of the double disc version on the DVD of the film.

== Release ==
The film premiered on 3 August 2008 in the Dutch Filmmuseum in Overveen.

== Soundtrack ==
The soundtrack includes the hit single Alleen op de Wereld (Je Staat er Alleen voor) from Nino.
